= List of government schools in Victoria, Australia =

This is a list of government schools in Victoria, Australia.

== Primary schools ==
School	Suburb or town	Founded	School No.	Notes	Website
Abbotsford Primary School	Abbotsford	1877	1886	Chinese/English bilingual	website
Aberfeldie Primary School	Aberfeldie	1925	4220		website
Ainslie Parklands Primary School	Croydon	1962	4879		website
Aintree Primary School	Aintree	2021	5575		website
Aireys Inlet Primary School	Aireys Inlet	2017	5566		website
Airly Primary School	Airly	1924	4169		website
Aitken Creek Primary School	Craigieburn	2011	5522		website
Aitken Hill Primary School	Craigieburn	2019	5567		website
Alamanda K–9 College	Point Cook				website
Albanvale Primary School	Albanvale	1980	5179		website
Albany Rise Primary School	Mulgrave	1997	5427		website
Albert Park Primary School	Albert Park	1873	1181		website
Albert Street Primary School	Moe	1879	2142		website
Alberton Primary School	Alberton	1858	1		website
Albion North Primary School	Sunshine North	1961	4855		website
Albion Primary School	Albion	1926	4265		website
Aldercourt Primary School	Frankston North	1971	5043		website
Alexandra Primary School	Alexandra	1867	912		website
Alfredton Primary School	Alfredton	1871	1091		website
Allansford & District Primary School	Allansford	1856	3		website
Alphington Primary School	Alphington	1908	3599		website
Altona College	Altona			P–12	website
Altona Green Primary School	Altona Meadows	1990	5287		website
Altona Meadows Primary School	Altona Meadows	1982	5172		website
Altona North Primary School	Altona North	1965	4931		website
Altona Primary School	Altona	1915	3923		website
Alvie Primary School	Alvie	1952	6201		website
Amphitheatre Primary School	Amphitheatre	1875	1637		website
Amsleigh Park Primary School	Oakleigh East	1994	5428		website
Anakie Primary School	Anakie	1877	1910		website
Andersons Creek Primary School	Warrandyte	1977	5104		website
Anglesea Primary School	Anglesea	1927	4332		website
Antonio Park Primary School	Mitcham	1960	4844		website
Apollo Bay P–12 College	Apollo Bay				website
Apollo Parkways Primary School	Greensborough	1979	5184		website
Appin Park Primary School	Wangaratta	1982	5207		website
Apsley Primary School	Apsley	1873	1208		website
Araluen Primary School	Sale	1971	5021		website
Ararat North Primary School	Ararat	1979	4995		website
Ararat Primary School	Ararat	1865	800		website
Ararat West Primary School	Ararat	1955	4720		website
Ardeer Primary School	Ardeer	1961	4848		website
Ardeer South Primary School	Sunshine West	1972	5064		website
Ardmona Primary School	Ardmona	1875	1563		website
Armadale Primary School	Armadale	1884	2634		website
Armstrong Creek School	Armstrong Creek	2018	5564	Combined specialist and primary	website
Arnolds Creek Primary School	Harkness	2015	5557		website
Arthurs Creek Primary School	Arthurs Creek	1876	1666		website
Ascot Vale Primary School	Ascot Vale	1885	2608		website
Ascot Vale West Primary School	Ascot Vale	1920	4025		website
Ashburton Primary School	Ashburton	1928	4317		website
Ashby Primary School	Geelong West	1875	1492		website
Ashley Park Primary School	Doreen	2019	5569		website
Aspendale Gardens Primary School	Aspendale Gardens	2002	5301		website
Aspendale Primary School	Aspendale	1925	4193		website
Athol Road Primary School	Springvale South	2010	5536		website
Auburn Primary School	Hawthorn East	1889	2948		website
Auburn South Primary School	Hawthorn East	1925	4183		website
Austin School	Heidelberg		3605	For children who are patients of Austin Health	website
Avenel Primary School	Avenel	1856	8		website
Avoca Primary School	Avoca	1856	4		website
Avondale Primary School	Avondale Heights	1961	4812		website
Axedale Primary School	Axedale	1869	1008		website
Bacchus Marsh Primary School	Bacchus Marsh	1850	28		website
Baden Powell P–9 College	Derrimut, Tarneit	1992			website
Badger Creek Primary School	Badger Creek	1899	3309		website
Bairnsdale Primary School	Bairnsdale	1864	754		website
Bairnsdale West Primary School	Bairnsdale	1954	4725		website
Balambalam Primary School	Clyde North	2026	5610		website
Ballam Park Primary School	Frankston	1970	5005		website
Ballan Primary School	Ballan	1855	1435		website
Ballarat North Primary School	Ballarat North	1953	4690		website
Balliang East Primary School	Balliang East	1913	3787		website
Balmoral K–12 Community College	Balmoral				website
Balnarring Primary School	Balnarring	1876	1698		website
Balwyn North Primary School	Balwyn North	1950	4638		website
Balwyn Primary School	Balwyn	1869	1026		website
Bannockburn P–12 College	Bannockburn	2018	932		website
Banum Warrik Primary School	Kalkallo	2024	5601		website
Banyan Fields Primary School	Carrum Downs	1909	3613		website
Banyule Primary School	Rosanna	1960	4746		website
Baranduda Primary School	Baranduda	1880	2222		website
Barayip Primary School	Tarneit	2025	5614		website
Barnawartha Primary School	Barnawartha	1875	1489		website
Barrawang Primary School	Wollert West	2023	5585		website
Barton Primary School	Cranbourne West	2017	5560		website
Barwon Heads Primary School	Barwon Heads	1875	1574		website
The Basin Primary School	The Basin	1880	2329		website
Bass Valley Primary School	Corinella	1979	5195		website
Baxter Primary School	Baxter	1890	3023		website
Bayles Regional Primary School	Bayles	1994	5421		website
Bayside P–12 College	Altona, Williamstown, Newport				website
Bayswater North Primary School	Bayswater North	1923	4143		website
Bayswater Primary School	Bayswater	1879	2163		website
Bayswater South Primary School	Bayswater	1968	4973		website
Bayswater West Primary School	Bayswater	1971	5039		website
Beaconsfield Primary School	Beaconsfield	1890	3033		website
Beaconsfield Upper Primary School	Beaconsfield Upper	1883	2560		website
Bealiba Primary School	Bealiba	1865	749		website
Beaufort Primary School	Beaufort	1856	60		website
Beaumaris North Primary School	Beaumaris	1959	4803		website
Beaumaris Primary School	Beaumaris	1915	3899		website
Beeac Primary School	Beeac	1863	482		website
Beechworth Primary School	Beechworth	1875	1560		website
Belgrave South Primary School	Belgrave South	1907	3551		website
Bell Park North Primary School	Bell Park	1968	4962		website
Bell Primary School	Preston	1928	4309		website
Bellaire Primary School	Highton	1963	4873		website
Bellbrae Primary School	Bellbrae	1861	319		website
Bellbridge Primary School	Hoppers Crossing	1987	5254		website
Belle Vue Park Primary School	Glenroy	1997	5453		website
Belle Vue Primary School	Balwyn North	1963	4733		website
Belmont Primary School	Belmont	1856	26		website
Belvedere Park Primary School	Seaford	1966	4902		website
Benalla P–12 College	Benalla				website
Bendigo Primary School	Bendigo	1867	877		website
Bentleigh West Primary School	Bentleigh	1927	4318		website
Benton Junior College	Mornington	2003	5488		website
Berwick Chase Primary School	Berwick	2009	5503		website
Berwick Fields Primary School	Berwick	2006	5305		website
Berwick Lodge Primary School	Berwick	1990	5213		website
Berwick Primary School	Berwick	1857	40		website
Bethal Primary School	Meadow Heights	1979	5186		website
Bethanga Primary School	Bethanga	1877	1883		website
Beulah Primary School	Beulah	1891	3109		website
Beverford District Primary School	Beverford	1994	5407		website
Beveridge Primary School	Beveridge	1874	1476		website
Beverley Hills Primary School	Doncaster East	1959	4813		website
Big Hill Primary School	Big Hill	1875	1551		website
Billanook Primary School	Montrose	1979	5193		website
Bimbadeen Heights Primary School	Mooroolbark	1976	5011		website
Binap Primary School	Brookfield	2024	5600		website
Birchip P–12 School	Birchip				website
Birmingham Primary School	Mount Evelyn	1977	5048		website
Birralee Primary School	Doncaster	1970	4991		website
Birregurra Primary School	Birregurra	1864	723		website
Bittern Primary School	Bittern	1916	3933		website
Biyala Primary School	Armstrong Creek	2026	5621		website
Black Hill Primary School	Black Hill	1878	2043		website
Black Rock Primary School	Black Rock	1910	3631		website
Blackburn Lake Primary School	Blackburn	1964	4860		website
Blackburn Primary School	Blackburn	1889	2923		website
Boisdale Consolidated School	Boisdale	1951	6207		website
Bolinda Primary School	Bolinda	1870	1070		website
Bolwarra Primary School	Bolwarra	1874	1324		website
Bona Vista Primary School	Bona Vista	1909	3612		website
Bonbeach Primary School	Bonbeach	1958	4798		website
Boneo Primary School	Boneo	1873	1184		website
Boolarra Primary School	Boolarra	1884	2617		website
Boort District P–12 School	Boort				website
Boronia Heights Primary School	Boronia Heights	1968	4967		website
Boronia K–12 College	Boronia	2012			website
Boroondara Park Primary School	Balwyn North	1989	5288		website
Botanic Ridge Primary School	Botanic Ridge	2020	5224		website
Bourchier Street Primary School	Shepparton	1957	4742		website
Box Hill North Primary School	Box Hill North	1954	4717		website
Brandon Park Primary School	Wheelers Hill	1971	5038		website
Branxholme-Wallacedale Community School	Branxholme	1994	5377		website
Brentwood Park Primary School	Berwick	1995	5308		website
Briagolong Primary School	Briagolong	1871	1117		website
Briar Hill Primary School	Briar Hill	1927	4341		website
Bridgewater Primary School	Bridgewater on Loddon	1871	1097		website
Bridgewood Primary School	Officer	2018	5563		website
Bright P–12 College	Bright	1865	776		website
Brighton Beach Primary School	Brighton	1878	2048		website
Brighton Primary School	Brighton	1875	1542		website
Broadford Primary School	Broadford	1873	1125		website
Broadmeadows Primary School	Broadmeadows	1961	4875		website
Broadmeadows Valley Primary School	Broadmeadows	2009	5098		website
Broken Creek Primary School	Broken Creek	1866	862		website
Brookside P–9 College	Caroline Springs				website
Brunswick East Primary School	Brunswick East	1893	3179		website
Brunswick North Primary School	Brunswick West	1908	3585		website
Brunswick North West Primary School	Brunswick West	1929	4399		website
Brunswick South Primary School	Brunswick East	1886	2743		website
Brunswick South West Primary School	Brunswick West	1927	4304		website
Bruthen Primary School	Bruthen	1872	1141		website
Buangor Primary School	Buangor	1878	2072		website
Buchan Primary School	Buchan	1877	1905		website
Bullarto Primary School	Bullarto	1873	1288		website
Buln Buln Primary School	Buln Buln	1878	2017		website
Bundalaguah Primary School	Bundalaguah	1872	5392		website
Bundarra Primary School	Portland	1982	5228		website
Bundoora Primary School	Bundoora	1967	4944		website
Bungaree Primary School	Bungaree	1877	1960		website
Buninyong Primary School	Buninyong	1873	1270		website
Bunyip Primary School	Bunyip	1880	2229		website
Burnside Primary School	Burnside	2019	5502		website
Burwood East Primary School	Burwood East	1861	454		website
Burwood Heights Primary School	Burwood East	1965	4932		website
Buxton Primary School	Buxton	1875	1669		website
Cairnlea Park Primary School	Cairnlea	1874	1434		website
Caledonian Primary School	Brown Hill	1994	5384		website
California Gully Primary School	California Gully	1861	123		website
Camberwell Primary School	Camberwell	1867	888	French/English bilingual	website
Camberwell South Primary School	Glen Iris	1925	4170		website
Cambridge Primary School	Hoppers Crossing	1992	5312		website
Camelot Rise Primary School	Glen Waverley	1976	5111		website
Camp Hill Primary School	Bendigo	1878	1976		website
Campbellfield Heights Primary School	Campbellfield	1971	5034		website
Campbells Creek Primary School	Campbells Creek	1854	120		website
Camperdown College	Camperdown	1994		P–12	website
Canadian Lead Primary School	Ballarat East	1994	5383		website
Cann River P–12 College	Cann River		3920		website
Canterbury Primary School	Canterbury	1908	3572		website
Cape Clear Primary School	Cape Clear	1875	1484		website
Cardinia Primary School	Cardinia	1911	3689		website
Cardross Primary School	Cardross	1925	4263		website
Carisbrook Primary School	Carisbrook	1874	1030		website
Carlisle River Primary School	Carlisle River	1905	3497		website
Carlton Gardens Primary School	Carlton	1884	2605		website
Carlton North Primary School	Carlton North	1873	1252		website
Carlton Primary School	Carlton	1973	4980		website
Carnegie Primary School	Carnegie	1889	2897		website
Carranballac P–9 College	Point Cook	2002			website
Carraragarmungee Primary School	Londrigan	1976	1704		website
Carrum Primary School	Carrum	1901	3385		website
Carwatha College P–12	Noble Park North				website
Casey Fields Primary School	Cranbourne	2020	5570		website
Casterton Primary School	Casterton	1878	2058		website
Castlemaine North Primary School	Castlemaine	1878	2051		website
Castlemaine Primary School	Castlemaine	1855	119		website
Caulfield Junior College	Caulfield North	1914	3820		website
Caulfield Primary School	Caulfield South	2002	5489	Japanese/English bilingual	website
Caulfield South Primary School	Caulfield South	1928	4315		website
Cavendish Primary School	Cavendish	1852	116		website
Ceres Primary School	Ceres	1875	1602		website
Chalcot Lodge Primary School	Endeavour Hills	1983	5231		website
Chandler Park Primary School	Keysborough	2010	5533		website
Charles La Trobe P–12 College	Macleod	2011			website
Charlton College	Charlton			P–12	website
Chatham Primary School	Surrey Hills	1927	4314		website
Chelsea Heights Primary School	Chelsea Heights	1900	3341		website
Chelsea Primary School	Chelsea	1912	3729		website
Cheltenham East Primary School	Cheltenham	1956	4754		website
Cheltenham Primary School	Cheltenham	1855	84		website
Chewton Primary School	Chewton	1870	1054		website
Chiltern Primary School	Chiltern	1858	327		website
Chilwell Primary School	Newtown	1878	2061		website
Chirnside Park Primary School	Chirnside	1980	5194		website
Christmas Hills Primary School	Christmas Hills	1874	1362		website
Chum Creek Primary School	Healesville	1897	3279		website
Churchill North Primary School	Churchill	1976	5117		website
Churchill Primary School	Churchill	1968	4970		website
Clarinda Primary School	Clarinda	1899	3336		website
Clayton North Primary School	Clayton	1865	734		website
Clayton South Primary School	Clayton South	1929	4384		website
Clifton Creek Primary School	Clifton Creek	1912	3684		website
Clifton Hill Primary School	Clifton Hill	1874	1360		website
Clifton Springs Primary School	Clifton Springs	1989	5280		website
Clunes Primary School	Clunes	1875	1552		website
Clyde Creek Primary School	Clyde	2022	5588		website
Clyde Primary School	Clyde	1910	3664		website
Coatesville Primary School	Bentleigh East	1953	4712		website
Cobains Primary School	Cobains	1928	4387		website
Cobden Primary School	Cobden	1866	864		website
Cobram Primary School	Cobram	1952	6209		website
Coburg North Primary School	Coburg	1937	4543		website
Coburg Primary School	Coburg	1853	484		website
Coburg West Primary School	Coburg	1917	3941		website
Coburn Primary School	Melton South	1975	5090		website
Cockatoo Primary School	Cockatoo	1907	3535		website
Cohuna Consolidated School	Cohuna	1948	6211		website
Coimadai Primary School	Coimadai	1863	716		website
Colac Primary School	Colac	1850	117		website
Colac South West Primary School	Colac	1959	4775		website
Colac West Primary School	Colac	1923	4064		website
Colbinabbin Primary School	Colbinabbin	1917	3936		website
Coldstream Primary School	Coldstream	1977	5127		website
Coleraine Primary School	Coleraine	1878	2118		website
Collingwood College	Abbotsford	1882		P–12	website
Concongella Primary School	Concongella	1872	1136		website
Congupna Primary School	Congupna	1884	2563		website
Coolaroo South Primary School	Coolaroo	2013	5554		website
Coral Park Primary School	Hampton Park	1991	5292		website
Corryong College	Corryong				website
Courtenay Gardens Primary School	Cranbourne North	1995	5371		website
Cowes Primary School	Cowes, Phillip Island	1874	1282		website
Cowwarr Primary School	Cowwarr	1877	1967		website
Craigieburn Primary School	Craigieburn	1956	4770		website
Craigieburn South Primary School	Craigieburn	1986	5243		website
Cranbourne Carlisle Primary School	Cranbourne	2010	5510		website
Cranbourne East Primary School	Cranbourne East	2011	5518		website
Cranbourne Park Primary School	Cranbourne	1962	4887		website
Cranbourne Primary School	Cranbourne	1878	2068		website
Cranbourne South Primary School	Cranbourne South	1956	4755		website
Cranbourne West Primary School	Cranbourne	1979	5189		website
Creekside K–9 College	Caroline Springs	2012			website
Creswick North Primary School	Creswick	1878	2041		website
Creswick Primary School	Creswick	1854	122		website
Crib Point Primary School	Crib Point	1890	3080		website
Croydon Hills Primary School	Croydon Hills	1988	5255		website
Croydon Primary School	Croydon	1888	2900		website
Cudgee Primary School	Cudgee	1862	105		website
Dallas Brooks Community Primary School	Dallas	2011	5546		website
Dana Street Primary School	Ballarat	1857	33		website
Dandenong North Primary School	Dandenong	1954	4723		website
Dandenong Primary School	Dandenong	1874	1403		website
Dandenong South Primary School	Dandenong	1961	4810		website
Dandenong West Primary School	Dandenong	1925	4217		website
Darley Primary School	Bacchus Marsh	1981	5200		website
Darnum Primary School	Darnum	1881	2319		website
Darrang Primary School	Knoxfield	1994	5426		website
Darraweit Guim Primary School	Darraweit Guim	1867	878		website
Dartmoor Primary School	Dartmoor	1871	1035		website
Davis Creek Primary School	Tarneit	2020	5505		website
Daylesford Primary School	Daylesford	1975	1609		website
Deans Marsh Primary School	Deans Marsh	1975	1642		website
Deanside Primary School	Deanside	2022	5578		website
Debney Meadows Primary School	Flemington	1975	5068		website
Dederang Primary School	Dederang	1877	1772		website
Deepdene Primary School	Deepdene	1911	3680		website
Deer Park North Primary School	Deer Park	1977	5084		website
Deer Park West Primary School	Deer Park	1971	5032		website
Delacombe Primary School	Delacombe	1981	5201		website
Derinya Primary School	Frankston South	1971	4996		website
Derrimut Primary School	Derrimut	2010	5512		website
Derrinallum P–12 College	Derrinallum				website
Devenish Primary School	Devenish	1876	1764	Ghost school	
Devon Meadows Primary School	Devon Meadows	1916	3924		website
Dhurringile Primary School	Dhurringile	1917	3944		website
Diamond Creek East Primary School	Diamond Creek	1971	5037		website
Diamond Creek Primary School	Diamond Creek	1870	1003		website
Diggers Rest Primary School	Diggers Rest	1882	2479		website
Dillbadin Primary School	Boronia	1963	4908		website
Dimboola Primary School	Dimboola	1874	1372		website
Dingley Primary School	Dingley Village	1925	4257		website
Dinjerra Primary School	Braybrook	1997	5450		website
Docklands Primary School	Docklands	2021	5573		website
Dohertys Creek P–9 College	Truganina	2019			website
Don Valley Primary School	Don Valley	1917	3956		website
Donald Primary School	Donald	1874	1465		website
Donburn Primary School	Doncaster East	1973	5019		website
Doncaster Gardens Primary School	Doncaster East	1997	5454		website
Doncaster Primary School	Doncaster	1861	197		website
Donnybrook Primary School	Donnybrook	2023	5577		website
Donvale Primary School	Donvale	1967	4961		website
Dookie Primary School	Dookie	1875	1527		website
Doreen Primary School	Doreen	1868	945		website
Dorset Primary School	Croydon	1978	5132		website
Doveton College	Doveton	2012		P–9	website
Dromana Primary School	Dromana	1861	184		website
Drouin Primary School	Drouin	1877	1924		website
Drouin South Primary School	Drouin South	1880	2313		website
Drouin West Primary School	Drouin West	1874	1417		website
Drysdale Primary School	Drysdale	1875	1645		website
Dunkeld Consolidated School	Dunkeld	1953	6215		website
Dunolly Primary School	Dunolly	1875	1582		website
Eagle Point Primary School	Eagle Point	1894	3215		website
Eaglehawk North Primary School	Eaglehawk	1874	1428		website
Eaglehawk Primary School	Eaglehawk	1854	210		website
East Bentleigh Primary School	Bentleigh East	1960	4837		website
East Loddon P–12 College	Dingee				website
Eastbourne Primary School	Rosebud	1979	5133		website
Eastwood Primary School	Ringwood East	1953	4702		website
Echuca East Primary School	Echuca	1885	2667		website
Echuca Primary School	Echuca	1858	208		website
Echuca Twin Rivers Primary School	Echuca	2018	5516		website
Edenhope College	Edenhope	1994		P–12	website
Edgars Creek Primary School	Wollert	2021	5310		website
Edi Upper Primary School	Edi Upper	1874	1422		website
Edithvale Primary School	Edithvale	1913	3790		website
Eildon Primary School	Eildon	1916	3931		website
Elliminyt Primary School	Elliminyt	1878	2028		website
Ellinbank Primary School	Ellinbank	1879	2189		website
Elmhurst Primary School	Elmhurst	1868	959	Ghost school	
Elmore Primary School	Elmore	1875	1515		website
Elphinstone Primary School	Elphinstone	1856	220		website
Elsternwick Primary School	Brighton	1888	2870		website
Eltham East Primary School	Eltham	1963	4897		website
Eltham North Primary School	Eltham North	1924	4212		website
Eltham Primary School	Eltham	1856	209		website
Elwood Primary School	Elwood	1917	3942		website
Emerald Primary School	Emerald	1879	3381		website
Eppalock Primary School	Axe Creek	1874	1788		website
Epping Primary School	Epping	1874	5551		website
Epping Views Primary School	Epping	2008	5513		website
Epsom Primary School	Epsom	1881	2367		website
Eskdale Primary School	Eskdale	1877	2318		website
Essendon North Primary School	Essendon North	1920	4015		website
Essendon Primary School	Essendon	1850	483		website
Essex Heights Primary School	Mount Waverley	c. 1970			website
Euroa Primary School	Euroa		1706		website
Everton Primary School	Everton				website
Exford Primary School	Exford		3423		website
Eynesbury Primary School	Eynesbury	2021			website
Fairfield Primary School	Fairfield	1885	2711		website
Fairhills Primary School	Ferntree Gully	1965			website
Falls Creek Primary School	Falls Creek				website
Fawkner Primary School	Fawkner		3590		website
Featherbrook P–9 College	Point Cook	2017			website
Ferntree Gully North Primary School	Ferntree Gully	1954			website
Ferny Creek Primary School	Ferny Creek		3228		website
Findon Primary School	Mill Park				website
Fish Creek and District Primary School	Fish Creek		3028		website
Fitzroy North Primary School	Fitzroy North	1875	1490		website
Fitzroy Primary School	Fitzroy		450		website
Fleetwood Primary School	Narre Warren				website
Flemington Primary School	Flemington	1858	250		website
Flowerdale Primary School	Flowerdale		3098		website
Footscray City Primary School	Footscray	1878	1912		website
Footscray North Primary School	Footscray	1923			website
Footscray Primary School	Footscray		253		website
Footscray West Primary School	West Footscray		3890		website
Forest Street Primary School	Wendouree	1966			website
Forrest Primary School	Forrest		2708		website
Foster Primary School	Foster				website
Fountain Gate Primary School	Narre Warren				website
Frankston East Primary School	Frankston				website
Frankston Heights Primary School	Frankston				website
Frankston Primary School	Frankston	1874	1464		website
Fyans Park Primary School	Newton, Geelong				website
Gaayip–Yagila Primary School	Mickleham	2021			website
Gamadji Primary School	Craigieburn	2026			website
Gardenvale Primary School	Brighton East	1922	3897		website
Garfield Primary School	Garfield		2724		website
Garrang Wilam Primary School	Truganina	2021			website
Geelong East Primary School	Geelong	1857	541		website
Geelong South Primary School	Geelong		2143		website
Gembrook Primary School	Gembrook		2506		website
George Street Primary School	Hamilton				website
Gilgai Plains Primary School	Kalkallo	2022			website
Girgarre Primary School	Girgarre		3971		website
Gisborne Primary School	Gisborne	1853	262		website
Gladesville Primary School	Kilsyth				website
Gladstone Park Primary School	Gladstone Park	1970			website
Gladstone Views Primary School	Gladstone Park				website
Gladysdale Primary School	Gladysdale		3982		website
Glen Huntly Primary School	Carnegie		3703		website
Glen Iris Primary School	Glen Iris	1872	1148		website
Glen Katherine Primary School	Eltham North	1988			website
Glen Park Primary School	Glen Park	1870	1135		website
Glen Waverley Primary School	Glen Waverley	1994			website
Glen Waverley South Primary School	Glen Waverley				website
Glendal Primary School	Glen Waverley	1971			website
Glenferrie Primary School	Hawthorn	1875	1508		website
Glengala Primary School	Sunshine West				website
Glengarry Primary School	Glengarry		2888		website
Glenrowan Primary School	Glenrowan		1742		website
Glenroy Central Primary School	Glenroy				website
Glenroy West Primary School	Glenroy				website
Golden Square Primary School	Golden Square				website
Goonawarra Primary School	Sunbury				website
Goornong Primary School	Goornong		1598		website
Gordon Primary School	Gordon		755		website
Gormandale and District Primary School	Gormandale				website
Goroke P–12 College	Goroke				website
Gowrie Street Primary School	Shepparton				website
Grahamvale Primary School	Grahamvale				website
The Grange P–12 College	Hoppers Crossing				website
Grasmere Primary School	Grasmere				website
Grayling Primary School	Clyde North	2020			website
Great Ryrie Primary School	Heathmont	1998			website
Great Western Primary School	Great Western		860		website
Greenhills Primary School	Greensborough	1962			website
Greensborough Primary School	Greensborough		2062		website
Greenvale Primary School	Greenvale	1868	890		website
Greta Valley Primary School	Greta South				website
Grey Street Primary School	Traralgon	1912	3584		website
Greythorn Primary School	Balwyn North	1953			website
Grovedale Primary School	Grovedale	1855	283		website
Grovedale West Primary School	Grovedale				website
Gruyere Primary School	Gruyere			Ghost school	
Gunbower Primary School	Gunbower		2231		website
Guthridge Primary School	Sale				website
Guthrie Street Primary School	Shepparton				website
Haddon Primary School	Haddon	1870	1076		website
Hallam Primary School	Hallam		244		website
Halls Gap Primary School	Halls Gap		3058		website
Hamilton (Gray Street) Primary School	Hamilton		295		website
Hamilton North Primary School	Hamilton		2035		website
Hamlyn Banks Primary School	Hamlyn Heights				website
Hampton Park Primary School	Hampton Park				website
Hampton Primary School	Hampton	1913	3754		website
Harcourt Valley Primary School	Harcourt				website
Harkaway Primary School	Harkaway	c. 1880	1697		website
Harrietville Primary School	Harrietville	1866	843		website
Harrisfield Primary School	Nobel Park	1866			website
Harston Primary School	Harston	1874	1458		website
Hartwell Primary School	Camberwell	1922	4055		website
Harvest Home Primary School	Epping	2017			website
Hastings Primary School	Hastings	1872	1098		website
Hawkesdale P–12 College	Hawkesdale				website
Hawthorn West Primary School	Hawthorn		293		website
Hazel Glen College	Doreen	2014		P–12	website
Hazelwood North Primary School	Hazelwood North		2382		website
Healesville Primary School	Healesville	1866	849		website
Heany Park Primary School	Rowville	1993			website
Heathcote Primary School	Heathcote		300		website
Heatherhill Primary School	Springvale	1958			website
Heathmont East Primary School	Heathmont				website
Heidelberg Primary School	Heidelberg	1854	294		website
Hepburn Primary School	Hepburn		767		website
Herne Hill Primary School	Hamlyn Heights				website
Hesket Primary School	Hesket	1870	1004		website
Heyfield Primary School	Heyfield	1871	1108		website
Heywood Consolidated School	Heywood				website
Highton Primary School	Highton	1880	304		website
Highvale Primary School	Glen Waverley				website
Hillsmeade Primary School	Narre Warren South				website
Hoddles Creek Primary School	Hoddles Creek		2541		website
Hopetoun P–12 College	Hopetoun				website
Horsham Primary School	Horsham				website
Horsham West and Haven Primary School	Horsham & Haven				website
Hughesdale Primary School	Hughesdale				website
Huntingdale Primary School	Oakleigh South			Japanese/English bilingual	website
Huntly Primary School	Huntly		306		website
Hurstbridge Primary School	Hurstbridge	1916	3939		website
Inglewood Primary School	Inglewood		1052		website
Invergordon Primary School	Invergordon				website
Inverleigh Primary School	Inverleigh		1147		website
Inverloch Primary School	Inverloch		2776		website
Invermay Primary School	Invermay	1867	882		website
Iramoo Primary School	Wyndham Vale	1978			website
Irymple Primary School	Irymple		3174		website
Irymple South Primary School	Irymple		3702		website
Ivanhoe East Primary School	Ivanhoe East				website
Ivanhoe Primary School	Ivanhoe	1853	2436		website
James Cook Primary School	Endeavour Hills				website
Jamieson Primary School	Jamieson		814		website
Jells Park Primary School	Wheelers Hill				website
Jeparit Primary School	Jeparit		2988		website
Jindivick Primary School	Jindivick		1951		website
John Henry Primary School	Pakenham	2017			website
Kala Primary School	Cranbourne North	2026			website
Kalinda Primary School	Ringwood				website
Kallista Primary School	Kallista		3993		website
Kananook Primary School	Seaford				website
Kangaroo Flat Primary School	Kangaroo Flat		981		website
Kangaroo Ground Primary School	Kangaroo Ground		2105		website
Kaniva College	Kaniva	1883		P–12	website
Karingal Heights Primary School	Frankston				website
Karingal Primary School	Frankston				website
Karoo Primary School	Rowville	1992			website
Karwan Primary School	Tarneit	2023			website
Katamatite Primary School	Katamatite		2069		website
Katandra West Primary School	Katandra West				website
Katunga Primary School	Katunga				website
Keelonith Primary School	Greenvale	2021			website
Keilor Heights Primary School	Keilor East				website
Keilor Primary School	Keilor	1875	1878		website
Keilor Views Primary School	Keilor Downs	2010			website
Kennington Primary School	Kennington	c. 1920	3686		website
Kensington Primary School	Kensington		2374		website
Kent Park Primary School	Ferntree Gully				website
Kerang Primary School	Kerang		1410		website
Kerang South Primary School	Kerang				website
Kerribana Primary School	Leneva	2026			website
Kerrimuir Primary School	Box Hill North	1959			website
Kew East Primary School	Kew East	1892	3161		website
Kew Primary School	Kew	1870	1075		website
Keysborough Gardens Primary School	Keysborough	2020			website
Keysborough Primary School	Springvale				website
Kialla Central Primary School	Kialla		1366		website
Kialla West Primary School	Kialla West		1727		website
Kiewa Valley Primary School	Tangambalanga				website
Kilberry Valley Primary School	Hampton Park				website
Killara Primary School	Sunbury				website
Kilmore Primary School	Kilmore		1568		website
Kilsyth Primary School	Kilsyth	1910	3645		website
Kinglake Primary School	Kinglake		2188		website
Kinglake West Primary School	Kinglake		3255		website
Kings Park Primary School	Kings Park				website
Kingsbury Primary School	Kingsbury				website
Kingsley Park Primary School	Frankston				website
Kingston Heath Primary School	Cheltenham				website
Kingsville Primary School	Yarraville	1919	3988		website
Kingswood Primary School	Dingley Village				website
Kismet Park Primary School	Sunbury	1980			website
Knox Central Primary School	Boronia	1965			website
Knox Gardens Primary School	Wantirna South				website
Knox Park Primary School	Knoxfield				website
Kongwak Primary School	Kongwak		3323		website
Koo Wee Rup Primary School	Koo Wee Rup		2629		website
Koondrook Primary School	Koondrook		2265		website
Koorlong Primary School	Koorlong		3470		website
Koroit and District Primary School	Koroit	1857	618		website
Kororoit Creek Primary School	Burnside Heights	2011	5499		website
Korumburra Primary School	Korumburra	c. 1920	3077		website
Kosciuszko St Primary School	Traralgon				website
Kuluap Primary School	Clyde	2026			website
Kunyung Primary School	Mount Eliza				website
Kurmile Primary School	Officer	2024			website
Kurrun Primary School	Officer	2023			website
Kurunjang Primary School	Kurunjang				website
Kuyim Primary School	Pakenham	2025			website
Kyabram P–12 College	Kyabram				website
Kyneton Primary School	Kyneton		343		website
Laa Yulta Primary School	Mambourin	2024			website
Labertouche Primary School	Labertouche		2471		website
Laburnum Primary School	Blackburn	1964			website
Laharum Primary School	Laharum		2805		website
Lake Boga Primary School	Lake Boga		3278		website
Lake Bolac College	Lake Bolac		854	P–12	website
Lake Charm Primary School	Lake Charm			Ghost school	
The Lake Primary School	Cabarita		3581		website
Lakes Entrance Primary School	Lakes Entrance		2672		website
The Lakes South Morang College	South Morang			P–12	website
Lal Lal Primary School	Lal Lal		863		website
Lalor East Primary School	Thomastown				website
Lalor Gardens Primary School	Lalor	2010			website
Lalor North Primary School	Lalor	1971			website
Lalor Primary School	Lalor	1954			website
Lancaster Primary School	Lancaster		1814		website
Lancefield Primary School	Lancefield	1858	707		website
Landsborough Primary School	Landsborough		1862		website
Lang Lang Primary School	Lang Lang		2899		website
Langley Primary School	Langley		1275		website
Langwarrin Park Primary School	Langwarrin				website
Langwarrin Primary School	Langwarrin		3531		website
Lara Lake Primary School	Lara	1865	769		website
Lara Primary School	Lara				website
Lardner and District Primary School	Lardner				website
Launching Place Primary School	Launching Place		2599		website
Laurimar Primary School	Doreen				website
Lavers Hill K–12 College	Lavers Hill				website
Laverton P–12 College	Laverton				website
Le Page Primary School	Cheltenham	1995			website
Leitchville Primary School	Leitchville		2086		website
Lemnos Primary School	Lemnos				website
Leongatha Primary School	Leongatha	c. 1890	2981		website
Leopold Primary School	Leopold		1146		website
Lethbridge Primary School	Lethbridge		1386		website
Liddiard Road Primary School	Traralgon				website
Lightning Reef Primary School	North Bendigo				website
Lilydale Primary School	Lilydale	1866	876		website
Lindenow Primary School	Lindenow		1120		website
Lindenow South Primary School	Lindenow South		2963		website
Linton Primary School	Linton		880		website
Lismore Primary School	Lismore		1293		website
Little Bendigo Primary School	Nerrina	1857	2093		website
Little River Primary School	Little River		1961		website
Livingstone Primary School	Vermont South	1978			website
Lloyd Street Primary School	Malvern East	1923	4139		website
Loch Primary School	Loch		2912		website
Loch Sport Primary School	Loch Sport				website
Lockington Consolidated School	Lockington				website
Lockwood Primary School	Lockwood		744		website
Lockwood South Primary School	Lockwood South		385		website
Lollypop Creek Primary School	Werribee	2023			website
Longford Primary School	Longford		1694		website
Longwarry Primary School	Longwarry		2505		website
Longwood Primary School	Longwood		2707		website
Lorne P–12 College	Lorne	1879			website
Lower Plenty Primary School	Lower Plenty		1295		website
Lucas Primary School	Lucas	2020			website
Lucknow Primary School	Bairnsdale		1231		website
Lynbrook Primary School	Lynbrook	2005			website
Lyndale Greens Primary School	Dandenong North	2010			website
Lyndhurst Primary School	Lyndhurst				website
Lysterfield Primary School	Lysterfield	1877	1866		website
Macarthur Primary School	Macarthur		1571		website
Macarthur Street Primary School	Soldiers Hill	1878	2022		website
Macclesfield Primary School	Macclesfield		3620		website
Macedon Primary School	Macedon	1869	1660		website
Mackellar Primary School	Delahey				website
Macleod College	Macleod	1954		P–12	website
Maffra Primary School	Maffra		861		website
Magpie Primary School	Magpie	1857	2271		website
Mahogany Rise Primary School	Frankston North				website
Maiden Gully Primary School	Maiden Gully		1592		website
Maldon Primary School	Maldon		1254		website
Mallacoota P–12 College	Mallacoota		3515		website
Malmsbury Primary School	Malmsbury		1408		website
Malvern Central School	Malvern	1875	1604		website
Malvern Primary School	Malvern East	1884	2586		website
Malvern Valley Primary School	Malvern East				website
Manangatang P–12 College	Manangatang			P–12	website
Manchester Primary School	Mooroolbark				website
Mandama Primary School	Grovedale				website
Manifold Heights Primary School	Manifold Heights				website
Manor Lakes P–12 College	Manor Lakes				website
Manorvale Primary School	Werribee				website
Mansfield Primary School	Mansfield	1872	1112		website
Maramba Primary School	Narre Warren	1995			website
Marlborough Primary School	Heathmont				website
Marlo Primary School	Marlo		3433		website
Marnoo Primary School	Marnoo		1554		website
Marong Primary School	Marong		400		website
Maroona Primary School	Maroona		1943		website
Marysville Primary School	Marysville		1273		website
McKinnon Primary School	Ormond				website
Meadow Heights Primary School	Meadow Heights				website
Meadowglen Primary School	Epping				website
Meadows Primary School	Broadmeadows				website
Meeniyan Primary School	Meeniyan				website
Melrose Primary School	Wodonga		37		website
Melton Primary School	Melton		430		website
Melton South Primary School	Melton South		3717		website
Melton West Primary School	Melton				website
Mentone Park Primary School	Mentone				website
Mentone Primary School	Mentone		2950		website
Menzies Creek Primary School	Menzies Creek		2457		website
Merbein P–10 College	Merbein			P–10	website
Meredith Primary School	Meredith		1420		website
Merino Consolidated School	Merino				website
Mernda Central P–12 College	Mernda	2017			website
Mernda Park Primary School	Mernda	2017			website
Mernda Primary School	Mernda		488		website
Merri Creek Primary School	Fitzroy North		3110		website
Merri-bek Primary School	Coburg		2837		website
Merrigum Primary School	Merrigum		1874		website
Merrijig Primary School	Merrijig		1379		website
Merrivale Primary School	Warrnambool				website
Metung Primary School	Metung		3050		website
Mickleham Primary School	Mickleham		1051		website
Middle Indigo Primary School	Indigo Valley		1115		website
Middle Kinglake Primary School	Kinglake Central		3315		website
Middle Park Primary School	Middle Park		2815		website
Milawa Primary School	Milawa		737		website
Mildura Primary School	Mildura	1888	2915		website
Mildura South Primary School	Mildura				website
Mildura West Primary School	Mildura		3983		website
Milgate Primary School	Doncaster East				website
Mill Park Heights Primary School	Mill Park				website
Mill Park Primary School	Mill Park	1980			website
Millwarra Primary School	Warburton East & Millgrove				website
Miners Rest Primary School	Miners Rest		1739		website
Mindalk Primary School	Truganina	2026	5616		website
Minyip Primary School	Minyip		2167		website
Mirboo North Primary School	Mirboo North	1914	2383		website
Mirniyan Primary School	Clyde North	2025			website
Mirripoa Primary School	Mount Duneed	2020			website
Mitcham Primary School	Mitcham		2904		website
Mitta Mitta Primary School	Mitta Mitta	c. 1860	887		website
Moe South Street Primary School	Moe				website
Monbulk Primary School	Monbulk		3265		website
Monmia Primary School	Keilor Downs				website
Mont Albert Primary School	Mont Albert	1917	3943		website
Montmorency Primary School	Montmorency		4112		website
Montmorency South Primary School	Montmorency				website
Montpellier Primary School	Highton				website
Montrose Primary School	Montrose		2259		website
Moolap Primary School	Moolap	1878	1911		website
Moomba Park Primary School	Fawkner				website
Moonambel Primary School	Moonambel		1683		website
Moonee Ponds Primary School	Moonee Ponds		3987		website
Moonee Ponds West Primary School	Moonee Ponds	1888	2901		website
Moorabbin Primary School	Moorabbin		1111		website
Moorooduc Primary School	Moorooduc		2327		website
Mooroolbark East Primary School	Mooroolbark	1972			website
Mooroopna North Primary School	Mooroopna North		1612		website
Mooroopna Park Primary School	Mooroopna	1980			website
Mooroopna Primary School	Mooroopna	1873	1432		website
Morang South Primary School	South Morang	1877	1975		website
Mordialloc Beach Primary School	Mordialloc	1868	846		website
Moriac Primary School	Moriac	1922	4117		website
Mornington Park Primary School	Mornington				website
Mornington Primary School	Mornington		2033		website
Mortlake P–12 College	Mortlake				website
Morwell Central Primary School	Morwell	2017			website
Morwell Park Primary School	Morwell	1969			website
Mossfiel Primary School	Hoppers Crossing	1970			website
Mossgiel Park Primary School	Endeavour Hills				website
Mount Beauty Primary School	Mount Beauty				website
Mount Blowhard Primary School	Mount Blowhard		2037		website
Mount Clear Primary School	Mount Clear	1858	427		website
Mount Dandenong Primary School	Mount Dandenong		3284		website
Mount Duneed Regional Primary School	Mount Duneed				website
Mount Egerton Primary School	Mount Egerton		1918		website
Mount Eliza North Primary School	Mount Eliza	1979			website
Mount Eliza Primary School	Mount Eliza	c. 1890	1368		website
Mount Evelyn Primary School	Mount Evelyn		3642		website
Mount Macedon Primary School	Mount Macedon	1858	415		website
Mount Martha Primary School	Mount Martha				website
Mount Pleasant Primary School	Ballarat		1436		website
Mount Pleasant Road Primary School	Nunawading				website
Mount Ridley P–12 College	Craigieburn			P–12	website
Mount View Primary School	Glen Waverley	1965			website
Mount Waverley Heights Primary School	Mount Waverley				website
Mount Waverley North Primary School	Mount Waverley				website
Mount Waverley Primary School	Mount Waverley	1906	3432		website
Mountain Gate Primary School	Ferntree Gully				website
Movelle Primary School	Kings Park				website
Moyhu Primary School	Moyhu		1335		website
Moyston Primary School	Moyston		1263		website
Mulgrave Primary School	Mulgrave	1879	2172		website
Mullum Primary School	Ringwood				website
Murchison Primary School	Murchison	1871	1126		website
Murrabit Group School	Murrabit		3859		website
Murrayville Community College	Murrayville			P–12	website
Murrum Primary School	Weir Views	2026			website
Murrumbeena Primary School	Murrumbeena	1903	3449		website
Murtoa College	Murtoa		1549	P–12	website
Muyan Primary School	Wallan	2026			website
Myrniong Primary School	Myrniong		487		website
Myrrhee Primary School	Myrrhee		2677		website
Myrtleford P–12 College	Myrtleford				website
Nagambie Primary School	Nagambie		1104		website
Nambrok Denison Primary School	Nambrok				website
Nangiloc Colignan & District Primary School	Nangiloc & Colignan				website
Nanneella Estate Primary School	Nanneella	1911	3708		website
Napoleons Primary School	Napoleons		1072		website
Nar Nar Goon Primary School	Nar Nar Goon		2248		website
Narracan Primary School	Narracan		2295		website
Narrarrang Primary School	Port Melbourne	2026			website
Narrawong District Primary School	Narrawong				website
Narre Warren North Primary School	Narre Warren North		1901		website
Narre Warren South P–12 College	Narre Warren South				website
Nathalia Primary School	Nathalia		2060		website
Natimuk Primary School	Natimuk		1548		website
Natte Yallock Primary School	Natte Yallock		1347		website
Navarre Primary School	Navarre		1330		website
Nearnung Primary School	Tarneit	2023			website
Neerim District Rural Primary School	Neerim			Ghost school	
Neerim South Primary School	Neerim South		2432		website
New Gisborne Primary School	New Gisborne		467		website
Newborough East Primary School	Newborough				website
Newborough Primary School	Newborough				website
Newbury Primary School	Craigieburn	2017			website
Newcomb Primary School	Newcomb				website
Newham Primary School	Newham	1877	1913		website
Newhaven Primary School	Newhaven		3053		website
Newington Primary School	Ballarat	1860	2103		website
Newlands Primary School	Preston West				website
Newlyn Primary School	Newlyn	1858	453		website
Newmerella Primary School	Newmerella	1889	2930		website
Newport Gardens Primary School	Newport				website
Newport Lakes Primary School	Newport	1855	113		website
Newstead Primary School	Newstead		452		website
Newtown Primary School	Newtown		1887		website
Ngarri Primary School	Manor Lakes	2023			website
Nhill College	Nhill			P–12	website
Nichols Point Primary School	Nichols Point		3163		website
Nicholson Primary School	Nicholson		1716		website
Niddrie Primary School	Airport West	1961			website
Nilma Primary School	Nilma		2712		website
Noble Park Primary School	Noble Park		3664		website
Noorat Primary School	Noorat		1178		website
Norris Bank Primary School	Bundoora		3618		website
North Melbourne Primary School	North Melbourne	1857	1402		website
Northcote Primary School	Northcote	1874	1401		website
Northern Bay P–12 College	Corio, Geelong	1950			website
Nullawarre and District Primary School	Nullawarre		1652		website
Nullawil Primary School	Nullawil			Ghost school	website
Numurkah Primary School	Numurkah		2134		website
Nungurner Primary School	Nungurner				website
Nyah District Primary School	Nyah West				website
Nyora Primary School	Nyora		3401		website
Oak Park Primary School	Oak Park	1954			website
Oakleigh Primary School	Oakleigh		1601		website
Oakleigh South Primary School	Oakleigh South	1958			website
Oatlands Primary School	Narre Warren	1996			website
Oberon Primary School	Belmont				website
Ocean Grove Primary School	Ocean Grove		3100		website
Officer Primary School	Officer		2742		website
Old Orchard Primary School	Blackburn North				website
Olinda Primary School	Olinda		3494		website
Omeo Primary School	Omeo	1866	831		website
Orbost Community College	Orbost	2024		P–12	website
Orchard Grove Primary School	Blackburn South	c. 1990			website
Orchard Park Primary School	Officer	2021			website
Ormond Primary School	Ormond	1891	3074		website
Orrvale Primary School	Orrvale		3805		website
Osborne Primary School	Mount Martha	1873	2655		website
Osbornes Flat Primary School	Osbornes Flat		1463		website
Outdoor School	Bogong, Greta South	2010		Residential school	website
Ouyen P–12 College	Ouyen				website
Overport Primary School	Frankston				website
Oxley Primary School	Oxley		1399		website
Pakenham Consolidated School	Pakenham	c. 1890			website
Pakenham Hills Primary School	Pakenham				website
Pakenham Lakeside Primary School	Pakenham				website
Pakenham Primary School	Pakenham	2019			website
Pakenham Springs Primary School	Pakenham				website
Panmure Primary School	Panmure		1079		website
Panton Hill Primary School	Panton Hill		1134		website
Park Orchards Primary School	Park Orchards	1961			website
Park Ridge Primary School	Rowville				website
Parkdale Primary School	Parkdale				website
Parkhill Primary School	Ashwood				website
Parkmore Primary School	Foresthill				website
Parktone Primary School	Parkdale				website
Parkwood Green Primary School	Hillside				website
Pascoe Vale North Primary School	Pascoe Vale				website
Pascoe Vale Primary School	Pascoe Vale	1891	3081		website
Pascoe Vale South Primary School	Pascoe Vale South				website
The Patch Primary School	The Patch				website
Patterson Lakes Primary School	Patterson Lakes				website
Paynesville Primary School	Paynesville		2343		website
Pearcedale Primary School	Pearcedale		2961		website
Pembroke Primary School	Mooroolbark				website
Pender's Grove Primary School	Thornbury		3806		website
Penshurst Primary School	Penshurst		486		website
Pentland Primary School	Darley				website
Peranbin Primary College	Violet Town				website
Perseverance Primary School	French Island		3261		website
Phoenix P–12 Community College	Sebastopol				website
Pinewood Primary School	Mount Waverley	1961			website
Pleasant Street Primary School	Lake Wendouree	1877	695		website
Plenty Parklands Primary School	Mill Park	1999	1915		website
Point Cook P–9 College	Point Cook	1923	4159		website
Point Lonsdale Primary School	Point Lonsdale	1898	3322		website
Pomonal Primary School	Pomonal		2859		website
Poowong Consolidated School	Poowong				website
Porepunkah Primary School	Porepunkah	1873	1144		website
Port Fairy Consolidated School	Port Fairy	1874			website
Port Melbourne Primary School	Port Melbourne		2032		website
Portarlington Primary School	Portarlington		2455		website
Portland Bay Primary School	Portland				website
Portland North Primary School	Portland		1194		website
Portland Primary School	Portland		489		website
Portland South Primary School	Portland				website
Powlett River Primary School	Calyston				website
Preston North East Primary School	Preston				website
Preston Primary School	Preston	1875	1494		website
Preston South Primary School	Preston	1866	824		website
Preston West Primary School	Preston	1915	3885		website
Princes Hill Primary School	Princes Hill	1889	2955		website
Puckapunyal Primary School	Puckapunyal		1855		website
Pyalong Primary School	Pyalong		2005		website
Pyramid Hill College	Pyramid Hill		1712	P–12	website
Quarry Hill Primary School	Quarry Hill		1165		website
Quarters Primary School	Cranbourne West	2023			website
Queenscliff Primary School	Queenscliff		1190		website
Rainbow P–12 College	Rainbow				website
Ramlegh Park Primary School	Clyde North	2021			website
Ranfurly Primary School	Mildura				website
Rangebank Primary School	Cranbourne				website
Rangeview Primary School	Mitcham				website
Rawson Primary School	Rawson	1994			website
Raywood Primary School	Raywood	1864	1844		website
Red Cliffs East Primary School	Red Cliffs		4123		website
Red Cliffs Primary School	Red Cliffs		4057		website
Red Hill Consolidated School	Red Hill				website
Redesdale Mia Mia Primary School	Redesdale		2571		website
Regency Park Primary School	Wantirna	1977			website
Research Primary School	Research	1889	2959		website
Reservoir East Primary School	Reservoir				website
Reservoir Primary School	Reservoir		3960		website
Reservoir Views Primary School	Reservoir				website
Reservoir West Primary School	Reservoir	1954			website
Richmond Primary School	Richmond	1874			website
Richmond West Primary School	Richmond	1975		English/Mandarin bilingual	website
Riddells Creek Primary School	Riddells Creek		528		website
Ringwood Heights Primary School	Ringwood North	1965			website
Ringwood North Primary School	Ringwood North		4120		website
Ripplebrook Primary School	Ripplebrook		2129		website
Ripponlea Primary School	St. Kilda East	1922	4087		website
River Gum Primary School	Hampton Park				website
Riverbend Primary School	Wyndham Vale	2021			website
Riverwalk Primary School	Werribee	2020			website
Roberts McCubbin Primary School	Box Hill South	1927			website
Robinvale College	Robinvale				website
Rochester Primary School	Rochester		795		website
Rockbank Primary School	Rockbank	1868	919		website
Rokewood Primary School	Rokewood		531		website
Rolling Hills Primary School	Mooroolbark	1986			website
Rollins Primary School	Bell Post Hill	1975			website
Romsey Primary School	Romsey		366		website
Rosanna Golf Links Primary School	Rosanna				website
Rosanna Primary School	Rosanna	1940			website
Rosebud Primary School	Rosebud	1884	2627		website
Rosedale Primary School	Rosedale		770		website
Rosewood Downs Primary School	Dandenong North				website
Roslyn Primary School	Belmont	1951			website
Rowellyn Park Primary School	Carrum Downs				website
Rowville Primary School	Rowville	1973			website
Roxburgh Homestead Primary School	Roxburgh Park				website
Roxburgh Park Primary School	Roxburgh Park				website
Roxburgh Rise Primary School	Roxburgh Park	2005			website
Rupanyup Primary School	Rupanyup		1595		website
Rushworth P–12 College	Rushworth				website
Ruskin Park Primary School	Croydon				website
Rutherglen Primary School	Rutherglen		522		website
Rye Primary School	Rye		1667		website
Sale Primary School	Sale		545		website
Saltwater P–9 College	Point Cook	2019			website
San Remo Primary School	San Remo		1369		website
Sandringham East Primary School	Sandringham	1923			website
Sandringham Primary School	Sandringham		267		website
Sassafras Primary School	Sassafras		3222		website
Scoresby Primary School	Scoresby		1028		website
Seabrook Primary School	Seabrook				website
Seaford North Primary School	Seaford	1969			website
Seaford Park Primary School	Seaford				website
Seaford Primary School	Seaford		3835		website
Seaholme Primary School	Seaholme	1929			website
Seaspray Primary School	Seaspray				website
Sebastopol Primary School	Sebastopol	1978	1167		website
Selby Primary School	Selby				website
Serpell Primary School	Templestowe				website
Seville Primary School	Seville		2820		website
Seymour College	Seymour			P–12	website
Shelford Primary School	Shelford		379		website
Shepparton East Primary School	Shepparton East		1713		website
Sherbourne Primary School	Briar Hill				website
Sherbrooke Community School	Sassafras	1985			website
Silvan Primary School	Silvan		1801		website
Silverton Primary School	Noble Park North	1977			website
Simpson Primary School	Simpson				website
Skipton Primary School	Skipton		582		website
Skye Primary School	Skye		1222		website
Solway Primary School	Ashburton	1950			website
Somers Primary School	Somers	1930			website
Somerville Primary School	Somerville		2656		website
Somerville Rise Primary School	Somerville				website
Sorrento Primary School	Sorrento		1090		website
South Melbourne Park Primary School	Albert Park	2019			website
South Melbourne Primary School	Southbank	2018			website
South Yarra Primary School	South Yarra		583		website
Southern Cross Primary School	Endeavour Hills				website
Southmoor Primary School	Moorabbin	1963			website
Specimen Hill Primary School	Golden Square		1316		website
Spensley Street Primary School	Clifton Hill		3146		website
Spotswood Primary School	Spotswood		3659		website
Spring Gully Primary School	Spring Gully		3505		website
Spring Parks Primary School	Springvale				website
Springhurst Primary School	Springhurst		1583		website
Springside Primary School	Caroline Springs				website
Springvale Rise Primary School	Springvale	2010			website
St Albans East Primary School	St Albans	1956			website
St Albans Heights Primary School	St Albans	1968			website
St Albans Meadows Primary School	St Albans	1980			website
St Albans North Primary School	St Albans				website
St Albans Primary School	St Albans		2969		website
St Andrews Primary School	St Andrews		128		website
St Arnaud Primary School	St Arnaud		1646		website
St Georges Road Primary School	Shepparton				website
St Kilda Park Primary School	St Kilda	1882	2460		website
St Kilda Primary School	St Kilda	1875	1479		website
St Leonards Primary School	Glen Waverley		866		website
Stanhope Primary School	Stanhope		3937		website
Stanley Primary School	Stanley			Ghost school	
Stawell Primary School	Stawell		502		website
Stawell West Primary School	Stawell				website
Stevensville Primary School	St Albans				website
Stockdale Road Primary School	Traralgon				website
Stratford Primary School	Stratford		596		website
Strathaird Primary School	Narre Warren				website
Strathewen Primary School	Strathewen		3947		website
Strathfieldsaye Primary School	Strathfieldsaye		1211		website
Strathmerton Primary School	Strathmerton		2790		website
Strathmore North Primary School	Strathmore				website
Strathmore Primary School	Strathmore	1944			website
Strathtulloh Primary School	Strathtulloh	2022			website
Streeton Primary School	Yallambie				website
Sunbury Heights Primary School	Sunbury				website
Sunbury Primary School	Sunbury		1002		website
Sunbury West Primary School	Sunbury				website
Sunshine Harvester Primary School	Sunshine	2009			website
Sunshine Heights Primary School	Sunshine West				website
Sunshine North Primary School	Sunshine North				website
Sunshine Primary School	Sunshine		3113		website
Surfside Primary School	Ocean Grove				website
Surrey Hills Primary School	Surrey Hills		2778		website
Swan Hill North Primary School	Swan Hill				website
Swan Hill Primary School	Swan Hill		1142		website
Swan Reach Primary School	Swan Reach		1631		website
Swifts Creek P–12 School	Swifts Creek	2010			website
Sydenham - Hillside Primary School	Sydenham, Hillside		3559		website
Syndal South Primary School	Mount Waverley				website
Talbot Primary School	Talbot		954		website
Talgarno Primary School	Talgarno		1954		website
Tallangatta Primary School	Tallangatta		1365		website
Tallarook Primary School	Tallarook		1488		website
Tallygaroopna Primary School	Tallygaroopna		3067		website
Tambo Upper Primary School	Tambo Upper		2216		website
Tanjil South Primary School	Tanjil South		2840		website
Taradale Primary School	Taradale		614		website
Tarnagulla Primary School	Tarnagulla		1023		website
Tarneit P–9 College	Tarneit				website
Tarneit Rise Primary School	Tarneit	2018			website
Tarwin Lower Primary School	Tarwin Lower				website
Tate Street Primary School	Thomson				website
Tatura Primary School	Tatura		1441		website
Tawonga Primary School	Tawonga		2282		website
Taylors Hill Primary School	Taylors Hill				website
Taylors Lakes Primary School	Taylors Lakes	1989			website
Tecoma Primary School	Tecoma		3365		website
Teesdale Primary School	Teesdale		2065		website
Templestowe Heights Primary School	Templestowe Lower				website
Templestowe Park Primary School	Templestowe	1977			website
Templestowe Valley Primary School	Templestowe Lower	1969			website
Templeton Primary School	Wantirna				website
Tempy Primary School	Tempy				website
Terang College	Terang			P–12	website
Thomas Chirnside Primary School	Werribee				website
Thomas Mitchell Primary School	Endeavour Hills	1991			website
Thomastown East Primary School	Thomastown				website
Thomastown Meadows Primary School	Thomastown	1980			website
Thomastown Primary School	Thomastown	1855	631		website
Thomastown West Primary School	Thomastown				website
Thornbury Primary School	Thornbury		3889		website
Thornhill Park Primary School	Grangefields	2023			website
Thorpdale Primary School	Thorpdale	1889	2966		website
Timbarra P–9 College	Berwick				website
Timboon P–12 School	Timboon	1948			website
Timor Primary School	Timor		1207		website
Tinternvale Primary School	Ringwood East				website
Tongala Primary School	Tongala				website
Tooborac Primary School	Tooborac		1225		website
Toolamba Primary School	Toolamba		1455		website
Toolangi Primary School	Toolangi		3237		website
Toolern Vale and District Primary School	Toolern Vale				website
Toongabbie Primary School	Toongabbie		856		website
Toora Primary School	Toora	1888	2253		website
Tooradin Primary School	Tooradin		1503		website
Toorak Primary School	Toorak		3016		website
Toorloo Arm Primary School	Lake Tyers Beach		3968		website
Tootgarook Primary School	Tootgarook				website
Topirum Primary School	Clyde North	2024			website
Torquay Coast Primary School	Torquay	2018			website
Torquay P–6 College	Torquay		3368		website
Trafalgar Primary School	Trafalgar		2185		website
Traralgon South Primary School	Traralgon South		2114		website
Trawalla Primary School	Trawalla		1150		website
Trentham District Primary School	Trentham	1860	1588		website
Truganina P–9 College	Truganina				website
Truganina South Primary School	Truganina				website
Tucker Road Bentleigh Primary School	Bentleigh				website
Tullamarine Primary School	Tullamarine				website
Tulliallan Primary School	Cranbourne North	2017			website
Tungamah Primary School	Tungamah		2225		website
Turrun Primary School	Clyde North	2025			website
Tyabb Primary School	Tyabb	1891	3129		website
Tyabb Railway Station Primary School	Tyabb	1907	3544		website
Tyers Primary School	Tyers		2182		website
Tylden Primary School	Tylden		621		website
Tyrrell College	Sea Lake			P–12	website
Ultima Primary School	Ultima	1902	3426		website
Umarkoo Primary School	Wollert	2026	5620		website
Undera Primary School	Undera		1771		website
Underbool Primary School	Underbool		3819		website
University Park Primary School	St. Albans				website
Upper Ferntree Gully Primary School	Upper Ferntree Gully		3926		website
Upper Plenty Primary School	Upper Plenty		1244		website
Upper Sandy Creek Primary School	Sandy Creek		3145		website
Upwey Primary School	Upwey	1947			website
Upwey South Primary School	Upwey	1964			website
Valkstone Primary School	Bentleigh East	1957			website
Vermont Primary School	Vermont	c. 1870	1022		website
Victoria Road Primary School	Lilydale				website
Victorian School of Languages		1935		LOTE only, statewide enrolment	website
Viewbank Primary School	Viewbank	1966			website
Virtual School Victoria	Thornbury	1909		P–12	website
Wahgunyah Primary School	Wahgunyah		644		website
Wales Street Primary School	Thornbury	1891	3139		website
Wallan Primary School	Wallan		664		website
Wallarano Primary School	Noble Park				website
Wallaroo Primary School	Hastings				website
Wallington Primary School	Wallington	1866	3345		website
Walwa Primary School	Walwa		2806		website
Wandiligong Primary School	Wandiligong	1870	275		website
Wandin North Primary School	Wandin North		3892		website
Wandin Yallock Primary School	Wandin North		1033		website
Wandong Primary School	Wandong	1871	1277		website
Wangala Primary School	Belmont				website
Wangaratta Primary School	Wangaratta		643		website
Wangaratta West Primary School	Wangaratta				website
Wantirna Primary School	Wantirna	1912	3709		website
Wantirna South Primary School	Wantirna South	1940			website
Warburton Primary School	Warburton		1485		website
Warracknabeal Primary School	Warracknabeal		1334		website
Warragul North Primary School	Warragul		2104		website
Warragul Primary School	Warragul				website
Warrandyte Primary School	Warrandyte	1862	12		website
Warranwood Primary School	Warranwood		3476		website
Warreen Primary School	Truganina	2024			website
Warrenheip Primary School	Warrenheip	1860	1591		website
Warrnambool East Primary School	Warrnambool				website
Warrnambool Primary School	Warrnambool	1876	1743		website
Warrnambool West Primary School	Warrnambool		182		website
Watsonia Heights Primary School	Greensborough				website
Watsonia North Primary School	Watsonia North	1971			website
Watsonia Primary School	Watsonia				website
Wattle Glen Primary School	Wattle Glen		4060		website
Wattle Park Primary School	Burwood	1914	3841		website
Wattle View Primary School	Ferntree Gully	1971			website
Waubra Primary School	Waubra	1869	859		website
Waverley Meadows Primary School	Wheelers Hill	1975			website
Wedderburn College	Wedderburn			P–12	website
Wedge Park Primary School	Melton West				website
Weeden Heights Primary School	Vermont South				website
Welshpool and District Primary School	Welshpool				website
Wembley Primary School	Yarraville	1958			website
Wendouree Primary School	Wendouree		1813		website
Werribee Primary School	Werribee	1861	649		website
Werrimull P–12 School	Werrimull				website
Wesburn Primary School	Wesburn		3466		website
Westall Primary School	Clayton South				website
Westbreen Primary School	Pascoe Vale	1923	4158		website
Westgarth Primary School	Northcote	1924			website
Westgrove Primary School	Werribee				website
Westmeadows Primary School	Westmeadows	1870	982		website
Wheelers Hill Primary School	Wheelers Hill				website
White Hills Primary School	White Hills	1877	1916		website
Whitehorse Primary School	Blackburn North	1922			website
Whitfield District Primary School	Whitfield				website
Whittington Primary School	Whittington				website
Whittlesea Primary School	Whittlesea	1855	2090		website
Whorouly Primary School	Whorouly	1874	1373		website
Wilandra Rise Primary School	Clyde North	2017			website
Willaura Primary School	Willaura		2662		website
William Ruthven Primary School	Reservoir				website
Williamstown North Primary School	Williamstown	1874	1409		website
Williamstown Primary School	Williamstown	1873	1183		website
Willmott Park Primary School	Craigieburn				website
Willow Grove Primary School	Willow Grove		2520		website
Willowbank Primary School	Gisborne	2022			website
Willowmavin Primary School	Willowmavin		3479		website
Wilmot Road Primary School	Shepparton				website
Wimba Primary School	Tarneit	2024			website
Winchelsea Primary School	Winchelsea	2015	2015		website
Windsor Primary School	Windsor		1896		website
Winters Flat Primary School	Castlemaine	1860	652		website
Winton Primary School	Winton		1870		website
Wirrigirri Primary School	Wollert	2025			website
Wiyal Primary School	Fraser Rise	2026			website
Woady Yaloak Primary School	Ross Creek	1994			website
Wodonga Primary School	Wodonga				website
Wodonga South Primary School	Wodonga				website
Wodonga West Primary School	Wodonga				website
Wollert Primary School	Wollert	2022			website
Wonga Park Primary School	Wonga Park	1895	3241		website
Wonthaggi North Primary School	Wonthaggi	1912	3716		website
Wonthaggi Primary School	Wonthaggi		3650		website
Woodend Primary School	Woodend		647		website
Woodford Primary School	Woodford		648		website
Woodlands Primary School	Langwarrin				website
Woodside Primary School	Woodside		1176		website
Woodville Primary School	Hoppers Crossing	1973			website
Woolsthorpe Primary School	Woolsthorpe		688		website
Wooragee Primary School	Wooragee		653		website
Wooranna Park Primary School	Dandenong				website
Woori Yallock Primary School	Woori Yallock		1259		website
Woorinen District Primary School	Woorinen South				website
Wunghnu Primary School	Wunghnu		1938		website
Wurruk Primary School	Wurruk		2518		website
Wycheproof P–12 College	Wycheproof				website
Wyndham Park Primary School	Werribee				website
Wyndham Vale Primary School	Wyndham Vale				website
Yaapeet Primary School	Yaapeet				website
Yackandandah Primary School	Yackandandah	1872	1103		website
Yallourn North Primary School	Yallourn North		3967		website
Yandoit Primary School	Yandoit	1861	691		website
Yarra Glen Primary School	Yarra Glen		956		website
Yarra Junction Primary School	Yarra Junction	1894	3216		website
Yarra Primary School	Richmond	1888			website
Yarra Road Primary School	Croydon North	1925			website
Yarragon Primary School	Yarragon		2178		website
Yarram Primary School	Yarram		693		website
Yarraman Oaks Primary School	Noble Park	2008			website
Yarrambat Primary School	Yarrambat	1878	2054		website
Yarraville West Primary School	Yarraville	c. 1890	2832		website
Yarrawonga College P–12	Yarrawonga				website
Yarrunga Primary School	Wangaratta				website
Yea Primary School	Yea		699		website
Yering Primary School	Yering	1870	1034		website
Yinnar Primary School	Yinnar		2419		website
Yinnar South Primary School	Yinnar South		2730		website
Yirrama Primary School	Charlemont	2026			website
Yubup Primary School	Mickleham	2024			website
Yuille Park P–8 Community College	Wendouree, Delacombe				website
Yurran P–9 College	Point Cook	2026			website
Zeerust Primary School	Zeerust	1928			website

== Secondary schools ==
School	Suburb or town	Years	Founded	Notes	Website
Alamanda K–9 College	Point Cook	P–9	2010		website
Albert Park College	Albert Park	7–12	2010		website
Alexandra Secondary College	Alexandra	7–12	1953		website
Alkira Secondary College	Cranbourne North	7–12	2009		website
Altona College	Altona	P–12			website
Apollo Bay P–12 College	Apollo Bay	P–12			website
Ararat College	Ararat	7–12	1909		website
Ashwood High School	Ashwood	7–12	1958		website
Auburn High School	Hawthorn East	7–12	2014	English/French bilingual	website
Bacchus Marsh College	Maddingley	7–12	1921		website
Baden Powel P–9 College	Tarneit	P–9			website
Baimbridge College	Hamilton	7–12	2003		website
Bairnsdale Secondary College	Bairnsdale	7–12	1912		website
Ballarat High School	Lake Gardens	7–12	1907		website
Balmoral K–12 Community College	Balmoral	P–12			website
Balwyn High School	Balwyn North	7–12	1954		website
Bannockburn P–12 College	Bannockburn	P–12	2018		website
Bass Coast College	San Remo & Wonthaggi & Dudley	7–12			website
Bayside P–12 College	Altona & Williamstown	P–12			website
Bayswater Secondary College	Bayswater	7–12	1961		website
Beaufort Secondary College	Beaufort	7–12	1962		website
Beaumaris Secondary College	Beaumaris	7–12	2022		website
Beechworth Secondary College	Beechworth	7–12			website
Bellarine Secondary College	Drysdale, Ocean Grove	7–12	1957		website
Belmont High School	Belmont	7–12	1955		website
Bemin Secondary College	Truganina	7–12	2024		website
Benalla P–12 College	Benalla	P–12	1912		website
Bendigo Senior Secondary College	Bendigo	11–12	1907		website
Bendigo South East 7–10 Secondary College	Flora Hill	7–10	2009		website
Bentleigh Secondary College	Bentleigh East	7–12	1969		website
Berwick College	Berwick	7–12	1977		website
Bindjiroo Yaluk Community School	Richmond & Coburg	7–12	1983		website
Birchip P–12 School	Birchip	P–12			website
Birranga College	Clyde North	7–12	2026		website
Blackburn High School	Blackburn North	7–12	1956		website
Boort District P–12 School	Boort	P–12			website
Boronia K–12 College	Boronia	P–12	2012		website
Box Hill High School	Box Hill	7–12	1930		website
Box Hill Senior Secondary College	Mont Albert North	10–12	1943		website
Brauer College	Warrnambool	7–12	1911		website
Braybrook College	Braybrook	7–12	1960		website
Brentwood Secondary College	Glen Waverley	7–12	1969		website
Bright P–12 College	Bright	P–12	1876		website
Brighton Secondary College	Brighton East	7–12	1955		website
Brinbeal Secondary College	Tarneit	7–12	2024		website
Broadford Secondary College	Broadford	7–12	1960		website
Brookside P–9 College	Caroline Springs	P–9			website
Brunswick Secondary College	Brunswick	7–12	1995		website
Buckley Park College	Essendon	7–12	1963		website
Bundoora Secondary College	Bundoora	7–12	1971		website
Camberwell High School	Canterbury	7–12	1941		website
Camperdown College	Camperdown	P–12	1994		website
Cann River P–12 College	Cann River	P–12			website
Canterbury Girls' Secondary College	Canterbury	7–12	1928	Female only single-sex	website
Carranballac P–9 College	Point Cook	P–9	2002		website
Carrum Downs Secondary College	Carrum Downs	7–12	2004		website
Carwatha College P–12	Noble Park North	P–12			website
Casterton Secondary College	Casterton	7–12			website
Castlemaine Secondary College	Castlemaine	7–12			website
Chaffey Secondary College	Mildura	7–12			website
Charles La Trobe P–12 College	Macleod	P–12	2011		website
Charlton College	Charlton	P–12			website
Cheltenham Secondary College	Cheltenham	7–12	1959		website
Clyde Secondary College	Clyde	7–12	2022		website
Cobden Technical School	Cobden	7–12	1969		website
Cobram Secondary College	Cobram	7–12			website
Coburg High School	Coburg	7–12	1916, reopened 2007		website
Cohuna Secondary College	Cohuna	7–12			website
Colac Secondary College	Colac	7–12	c. 1880		website
Collingwood College	Abbotsford	P–12	1882		website
Copperfield College	Sydenham	7–12			website
Corryong College	Corryong	7–12			website
Craigieburn Secondary College	Craigieburn	7–12	1984		website
Cranbourne East Secondary College	Cranbourne East	7–12			website
Cranbourne Secondary College	Cranbourne	7–12			website
Cranbourne West Secondary College	Cranbourne West	7–12	2021		website
Croydon Community School	Croydon	7–12		Specialist school	website
Crusoe College	Kangaroo Flat	7–10			website
Dandenong High School	Dandenong	7–12	1919		website
Daylesford College	Daylesford	7–12	1889		website
Derrinallum P–12 College	Derrinallum	P–12			website
Diamond Valley College	Diamond Creek	7–12	1989		website
Dimboola Memorial Secondary College	Dimboola	7–12	1924		website
Dohertys Creek P–9 College	Truganina	P–9	2019		website
Donald High School	Donald	7–12	1963		website
Doncaster Secondary College	Doncaster	7–12	1969		website
Dromana College	Dromana	7–12			website
Drouin Secondary College	Drouin	7–12	1953		website
Eaglehawk Secondary College	Eaglehawk	7–12			website
East Doncaster Secondary College	Doncaster East	7–12	1974		website
East Loddon P–12 College	Dingee	P–12			website
Echuca College	Echuca	7–12	2006		website
Edenbrook Secondary College	Pakenham	7–12	2021		website
Edenhope College	Edenhope	P–12	1994		website
Edgars Creek Secondary College	Wollert	7–12			website
Elevation Secondary College	Craigieburn	7–12	2020		website
Elisabeth Murdoch College	Langwarrin	7–12	1984		website
Eltham High School	Eltham	7–12	1926		website
Elwood College	Elwood	7–12	1957		website
Emerald Secondary College	Emerald	7–12	1985		website
Epping Secondary College	Epping	7–12	1976		website
Essendon Keilor College	Essendon, Airport West, Keilor East	7–12	1993		website
Euroa Secondary College	Euroa	7–12			website
Fairhills High School	Knoxfield	7–12	1973		website
Featherbrook College P–9	Point Cook	P–9	2017		website
Fitzroy High School	Fitzroy North	7–12	1915		website
Footscray High School	Footscray, Seddon	7–12	1916		website
Forest Hill College	Burwood East	7–12	1990		website
Foster Secondary College	Foster	7–12	1920		website
Fountain Gate Secondary College	Narre Warren	7–12			website
Frankston High School	Frankston	7–12	1924		website
Geelong High School	East Geelong	7–12	1910		website
Gisborne Secondary College	Gisborne	7–12	1981		website
Gladstone Park Secondary College	Gladstone Park	7–12	1974		website
Glen Eira College	Caulfield East	7–12	1999		website
Glen Waverley Secondary College	Glen Waverley	7–12	1960		website
Gleneagles Secondary College	Endeavour Hills	7–12			website
Glenroy College	Glenroy	7–12			website
Goroke P–12 College	Goroke	P–12	1885		website
The Grange P–12 College	Hoppers Crossing	P–12	1993		website
Greater Shepparton Secondary College	Mooroopna, Shepparton	7–12	2022		website
Greensborough College	Greensborough	7–12	1990		website
Greenvale Secondary College	Greenvale	7–12	2022		website
Grovedale College	Grovedale	7–12	1979		website
Hallam Secondary College	Hallam	10–12	1967		website
Hampton Park Secondary College	Hampton Park	7–12	1986		website
Hawkesdale P–12 College	Hawkesdale	P–12			website
Hazel Glen College	Doreen	P–12	2014		website
Healesville High School	Healesville	7–12			website
Heathmont College	Heathmont	7–12	1993		website
Heywood & District Secondary College	Heywood	7–12			website
Highvale Secondary College	Glen Waverley	7–12	1977		website
Homestead Senior Secondary College	Point Cook	10–12	2020		website
Hopetoun P–12 College	Hopetoun	P–12			website
Hoppers Crossing Secondary College	Hoppers Crossing	7–12	1984		website
Horsham College	Horsham	7–12			website
Hume Central Secondary College	Broadmeadows	7–12	2008		website
Irymple Secondary College	Irymple	7–12			website
John Fawkner College	Fawkner	7–12	1956		website
John Monash Science School	Clayton	10–12	2010	STEM specialist school	website
Kambrya College	Berwick	7–12	2002		website
Kaniva College	Kaniva	P–12	1883		website
Keilor Downs College	Keilor Downs	7–12	1988		website
Kerang Technical High School	Kerang	7–12	1913		website
Kensington Community High School	Kensington	7–12	1975		website
Kew High School	Kew	7–12	1963		website
Keysborough Secondary College	Keysborough, Springvale South	7–12	2008		website
Kolorer College	Cobblebank	7–12	2026		website
Koo Wee Rup Secondary College	Koo Wee Rup	7–12	1952		website
Koonung Secondary College	Mont Albert North	7–12	1964		website
Korumburra Secondary College	Korumburra	7–12			website
Kurnai College	Churchill & Morwell	7–12			website
Kurunjang Secondary College	Kurunjang	7–12	1986		website
Kyabram P–12 College	Kyabram	P–12	1956		website
Kyneton High School	Kyneton	7–12	1912		website
Lake Bolac College	Lake Bolac	P–12			website
The Lakes South Morang College	South Morang	P–12	2007		website
Lakes Entrance Secondary College	Lakes Entrance	7–12			website
Lakeview Senior College	Caroline Springs	10–12	2012		website
Lalor North Secondary College	Epping	7–12			website
Lalor Secondary College	Lalor	7–12	1963		website
Lara Secondary College	Lara	7–12	2003		website
Lavers Hill K–12 College	Lavers Hill	P–12			website
Laverton P–12 College	Laverton	P–12			website
Leongatha Secondary College	Leongatha	7–12			website
Lilydale Heights College	Lilydale	7–12	1970		website
Lilydale High School	Lilydale	7–12	1919		website
Lorne P–12 College	Lorne	P–12	1879		website
Lowanna College	Newborough	7–12	1928		website
Lyndale Secondary College	Dandenong North	7–12	1961		website
Lyndhurst Secondary College	Cranbourne North	7–12			website
Mac.Robertson Girls' High School	Melbourne	7–12	1934	Female only single-sex	website
Macleod College	Macleod	P–12	1954		website
Maffra Secondary College	Maffra	7–12	1927		website
Mallacoota P–12 College	Mallacoota	P–12			website
Manangatang P–12 College	Manangatang	P–12			website
Manor Lakes P–12 College	Manor Lakes	P–12			website
Mansfield Secondary College	Mansfield	7–12	1962		website
Maribyrnong College	Maribyrnong	7–12	1958		website
Matthew Flinders Girls Secondary College	Geelong	7–12	1856	Female only single-sex	website
McClelland College	Frankston	7–12			website
McKinnon Secondary College	McKinnon	7–12	1954		website
Melba College	Croydon	7–12	2013		website
Melbourne Girls' College	Richmond	7–12	1994	Female only single-sex	website
Melbourne High School	South Yarra	9–12	1905	Male only single-sex	website
Melton Secondary College	Melton	7–12	1975		website
Mentone Girls' Secondary College	Mentone	7–12	1955	Female only single-sex	website
Merbein P–10 College	Merbein	P–10			website
Mernda Central P–12 College	Mernda	P–12	2017		website
Mickleham Secondary College	Mickleham	P–12	2023		website
Mildura Senior College	Mildura	11–12	1912		website
Mill Park Secondary College	Mill Park	7–12	1992		website
Mirboo North Secondary College	Mirboo North	7–12	1955		website
Monbulk College	Monbulk	7–12	1963		website
Monterey Secondary College	Frankston North	7–12	1994		website
Montmorency Secondary College	Montmorency	7–12			website
Mooroolbark College	Mooroolbark	7–12	1973		website
Mordialloc Secondary College	Mordialloc	7–12	1924		website
Mornington Secondary College	Mornington	7–12	1993		website
Mortlake College P–12	Mortlake	P–12			website
Mount Alexander College	Flemington	7–12	1858		website
Mount Beauty Secondary College	Mount Beauty	7–12	1964		website
Mount Clear College	Mount Clear	7–12	1976		website
Mount Eliza Secondary College	Mount Eliza	7–12	1975		website
Mount Erin College	Frankston South	7–12			website
Mount Ridley College	Craigieburn	P–12			website
Mount Rowan Secondary College	Wendouree	7–12			website
Mount Waverley Secondary College	Mount Waverley	7–12	1964		website
Mullauna College	Mitcham	7–12	1989		website
Murrayville Community College	Murrayville	P–12			website
Murtoa College	Murtoa	P–12			website
Myrtleford P–12 College	Myrtleford	P–12			website
Narre Warren South P–12 College	Narre Warren South	P–12	2002		website
Nathalia Secondary College	Nathalia	7–12			website
Neerim District Secondary College	Neerim South	7–12	1961		website
Newcomb Secondary College	Newcomb	7–12	1969		website
Ngayuk College	Kalkallo	7–12	2026		website
Nhill College	Nhill	P–12			website
Noble Park Secondary College	Noble Park	7–12	1962		website
North Geelong Secondary College	North Geelong	7–12			website
Northcote High School	Northcote	7–12	1926		website
Northern Bay P–12 College	Corio, Geelong	P–12	1950		website
Norwood Secondary College	Ringwood	7–12	1958		website
Nossal High School	Berwick	9–12	2010		website
Numurkah Secondary College	Numurkah	7–12			website
Oberon High School	Armstrong Creek	7–12	1963		website
Officer Secondary College	Officer	7–12	2016		website
Orbost Community College	Orbost	P–12	2024		website
Ouyen P–12 College	Ouyen	P–12			website
Pakenham Secondary College	Pakenham	7–12	1967		website
Parkdale Secondary College	Mordialloc	7–12	1964		website
Pascoe Vale Girls College	Pascoe Vale	7–12	1956	Female only single-sex	website
Patterson River Secondary College	Seaford	7–12	1968		website
Peter Lalor Secondary College	Lalor	10–12			website
Phoenix P–12 Community College	Sebastopol	P–12	1920		website
Point Cook P–9 College	Point Cook	P–9	1923		website
Point Cook Senior Secondary College	Point Cook	10–12			website
Port Melbourne Secondary College	Port Melbourne	7–12	2022		website
Portland Secondary College	Portland	7–12	1912		website
Prahran High School	Windsor	7–12	2019		website
Preston High School	Preston	7–12	2019		website
Princes Hill Secondary College	Carlton North	7–12	1889		website
Pyramid Hill College	Pyramid Hill	7–12			website
Rainbow P–12 College	Rainbow	P–12			website
Red Cliffs Secondary College	Red Cliffs	7–12			website
Reservoir High School	Reservoir	7–12	1958		website
Richmond High School	Richmond	7–12	2018		website
Ringwood Secondary College	Ringwood	7–12	1954		website
Robinvale College	Robinvale	7–12			website
Rochester Secondary College	Rochester	7–12			website
Rosebud Secondary College	Rosebud	7–12	1954		website
Rosehill Secondary College	Niddrie	7–12	1959		website
Rowville Secondary College	Rowville	7–12	1990		website
Roxburgh College	Roxburgh Park	7–12	2003		website
Rushworth P–12 College	Rushworth	P–12			website
Rutherglen High School	Rutherglen	7–12	1999		website
Sale College	Sale	7–12	1996		website
Saltwater P–9 College	Point Cook	P–9	2019		website
Sandringham College	Point Cook	7–12	1988		website
Scoresby Secondary College	Scoresby	7–12			website
Seymour College	Seymour	P–12	2010		website
Somerville Secondary College	Somerville	7–12			website
South Oakleigh Secondary College	Oakleigh South	7–12			website
Springside West Secondary College	Fraser Rise	7–12	2018		website
St Albans Secondary College	St Albans	7–12	1956		website
St Arnaud Secondary College	St Arnaud	7–12			website
St Helena Secondary College	Eltham North	7–12	1984		website
Staughton College	Melton	7–12	1979		website
Stawell Secondary College	Stawell	7–12			website
Strathmore Secondary College	Strathmore	7–12	1957		website
Sunbury College	Sunbury	7–12			website
Sunbury Downs College	Sunbury	7–12	1988		website
Sunshine College	Sunshine	7–12	1992		website
Surf Coast Secondary College	Torquay	7–12	2012		website
Suzanne Cory High School	Werribee	9–12	2011		website
Swan Hill College	Swan Hill	7–12			website
Swifts Creek P–12 School	Swifts Creek	P–12	2010		website
Swinburne Senior Secondary College	Hawthorn	11–12	1913		website
Sydney Road Community School	Brunswick	7–12	1972		website
Tallangatta Secondary College	Tallangatta	7–12			website
Tarneit P–9 College	Tarneit	P–9			website
Tarneit Senior College	Tarneit	10–12	2012		website
Taylors Lakes Secondary College	Taylors Lakes	7–12	1992		website
Templestowe College	Templestowe Lower	7–12	1994		website
Terang College	Terang	P–12	1848		website
Thomastown Secondary College	Thomastown	7–12	1971		website
Thornbury High School	Thornbury	7–12	1962		website
Timbarra P–9 College	Berwick	P–9			website
Timboon P–12 School	Timboon	P–12	1948		website
Trafalgar High School	Trafalgar	7–12	1964		website
Traralgon College	Traralgon	7–12			website
Truganina P–9 College	Truganina	P–9			website
Tyrrell College	Sea Lake	P–12			website
University High School	Parkville	7–12	1910		website
Upper Yarra Secondary College	Yarra Junction	7–12			website
Upwey High School	Upwey	7–12	1937		website
Vermont Secondary College	Vermont	7–12	1962		website
Victoria University Secondary College	Deer Park	7–12	2010		website
Victorian College of the Arts Secondary School	Southbank	7–12	1977		website
Victorian School of Languages		P–12	1935	LOTE only, statewide enrolment	website
Viewbank College	Viewbank	7–12	1994		website
Virtual School Victoria	Thornbury	P–12	1909	Online school, statewide enrolment	website
Walcom Ngarrwa Secondary College	Werribee	7–12	2024		website
Wallan Secondary College	Wallan	7–12			website
Wangaratta High School	Wangaratta	7–12	1909		website
Wantirna College	Wantirna	7–12	1980		website
Warracknabeal Secondary College	Warracknabeal	7–12	1901		website
Warragul Regional College	Warragul	7–12			website
Warrandyte High School	Warrandyte	7–12	1978		website
Warrnambool College	Warrnambool	7–12	1907		website
Wedderburn College	Wedderburn	P–12			website
Weeroona College Bendigo	White Hills	7–10	1999		website
Wellington Secondary College	Mulgrave	7–12	1973		website
Werribee Secondary College	Werribee	7–12	1858		website
Werrimull P–12 School	Werrimull	P–12			website
Westall Secondary College	Clayton South	7–12			website
Western Heights College	Hamlyn Heights	7–12	1985		website
Western Port Secondary College	Hastings	7–12			website
Wheelers Hill Secondary College	Wheelers Hill	7–12			website
Whittlesea Secondary College	Whittlesea	7–12	1977		website
William Ruthven Secondary College	Reservoir	7–12	2010		website
Williamstown High School	Williamstown	7–12	1914		website
Wodonga Middle Years College	Wodonga	3–9	2005		website
Wodonga Senior Secondary College	Wodonga	10–12	2005		website
Wollert Secondary College	Wollert	7–12	2023		website
Wonthaggi Secondary College	Wonthaggi	7–12			website
Woodmans Hill Secondary College	Ballarat East	7–12			website
Wulerrp Secondary College	Clyde North	7–12	2025		website
Wycheproof P–12 College	Wycheproof	P–12			website
Wyndham Central College	Werribee	7–12			website
Yarra Hills Secondary College	Mooroolbark, Mount Evelyn	7–12	1968		website
Yarrabing Secondary College	Aintree	7–12	2024		website
Yarram Secondary College	Yarram	7–12			website
Yarrawonga College P–12	Yarrawonga	P–12			website
Yea High School	Yea	7–12			website
Yuille Park P–8 Community College	Wendouree, Delacombe	P–8			website
Yurran P–9 College	Point Cook	P–9	2026		website

== Specialist schools ==
School	Suburb or town	Founded	Website
Armstrong Creek School	Armstrong Creek	2018	website
Ascot Vale Heights School	Ascot Vale	1980	website
Ashwood School	Ashwood	1976	website
Aurora School	Blackburn		website
Ballarat Specialist School	Lake Gardens, Ballarat		website
Banmira Specialist School	Shepparton	1999	website
Baringa Special School	Moe		website
Barwon Valley School	Belmont		website
Bass Coast Specialist School	Wonthaggi, Bass Coast		website
Bayside Special Developmental School	Moorabbin		website
Belmore School	Balwyn		website
Belvoir Wodonga Special Developmental School	Wodonga		website
Bendigo Special Developmental School	Kangaroo Flat, Bendigo		website
Broadmeadows Special Developmental School	Broadmeadows		website
Bulleen Heights School	Bulleen		website
Burwood East Special Developmental School	Burwood East		website
Cobram and District Specialist School	Cobram		website
Coburg Special Developmental School	Coburg		website
Concord School	Bundoora		website
Croxton Special School	Croxton		website
Croydon Special Developmental School	Croydon South	1990	website
Dandenong Valley Special Developmental School	Narre Warren		website
Dharra School	Aintree	2024	website
Diamond Valley Special Developmental School	Greensborough		website
East Gippsland Specialist School			website
Eastern Ranges School	Ferntree Gulley		website
Echuca Twin Rivers Specialist School	Echuca		website
Emerson School	Dandenong		website
Endeavour Hills Specialist School	Endeavour Hills	2022	website
Frankston Special Developmental School	Frankston		website
Furlong Park School For Deaf Children	Sunshine		website
Glenallen School	Glen Waverley		website
Glenroy Specialist School	Glenroy	1976	website
Hamilton Parklands School	Hamilton		website
Hamlyn Views School	Geelong	2018	website
Hampden P–12 School	Cobden		website
Hampton East School	Hampton East		website
Heatherwood School	Donvale		website
Horsham Special School	Horsham		website
Hume Valley School	Dallas		website
Jacana School for Autism	Jacana		website
Jackson School	St. Albans		website
Jennings Street School	Laverton		website
Kalianna Special School	North Bendigo		website
Lake Colac School	Colac	1985	website
Latrobe Special Developmental School	Traralgon		website
Marnebek School	Cranbourne		website
Marra School	Kalkallo	2026	website
Maryborough Education Centre	Maryborough		website
Melton Specialist School	Melton		website
Merri River School	Warrnambool		website
Merriang Special Developmental School	South Morang, Lalor		website
Mildura Specialist School	Mildura		website
Monash Special Developmental School	Wheelers Hill		website
Montague Continuing Education Centre	South Melbourne		website
Mornington Special Developmental School	Mornington		website
Naranga School	Frankston		website
Nelson Park School	Bell Park		website
Nepean Special School	Seaford, Frankston		website
Nganboo Borron School	Werribee	2024	website
Ngurraga School	Point Cook	2026	website
Niddrie Autistic School	Niddrie		website
Northern School For Autism	Reservoir, Lalor		website
Oakwood School	Noble Park North, Frankston, Caulfield North, Ormond, Chelsea		website
Officer Specialist School	Officer		website
Parkville College	Parkville		website
Peninsula Specialist College	Dromana		website
Port Phillip Specialist School	Port Melbourne		website
Portland Bay School	Portland		website
Rosamond Special School	Braybrook		website
Sale and District Specialist School	Sale		website
Seymour College	Seymour		website
Skene Street School Stawell	Stawell		website
South Gippsland Specialist School			website
Southern Autistic School			website
Springvale Park Special Developmental School	Springvale		website
Sunbury and Macedon Ranges Specialist School	Sunbury		website
Sunshine Special Developmental School	Sunshine		website
Swan Hill Specialist School	Swan Hill		website
Vermont South Special School	Vermont South		website
Victorian College For The Deaf			website
Wangaratta District Specialist School	Wangaratta		website
Waratah Special Developmental School	Bellfield		website
Warracknabeal Special Developmental School	Warracknabeal		website
Warragul & District Specialist School	Warragul		website
Warringa Park School	Hoppers Crossing		website
Wayi School	Craigieburn	2023	website
Western Autistic School			website
Yarra Ranges Special Developmental School	Mount Evelyn		website
Yarrabah School	Aspendale		website
Yarraville Special Developmental School	Yarraville		website

== Defunct schools ==
School	Suburb or town	Year opened	Year closed	Successor school or campus (if applicable)
A G Roberson Primary School	Rawson	1978	1993	Rawson Primary School
A1 Mine Settlement Primary School	Gaffney's Creek	1903	1975	
Acheron Primary School	Acheron	1874	1985	
Addington Primary School	Addington	1860	1974	
Agnes Primary School	Agnes	1890	1973	
Ailsa Primary School	Kellalac	1875	1971	
Alamein Primary School	Ashburton	1950	1993	
Alberton West (and District) Primary School	Alberton West	1879	1999	
Allans Flat Primary School	Allans Flat	1859	1994	
Allans Forest Primary School	Mepunga West	1871	1993	Allansford & District Primary School
Altona East Primary School	Altona	1960	2009	Newport Gardens Primary School
Altona Gate Primary School	Altona	1960	2009	Bayside P–12 College
Altona North Technical School	Altona	1959	1992	Bayside P–12 College
Amstle Primary School	Oakleigh East	1958	1993	Amsleigh Park Primary School
Ararat Technical School	Ararat	1969	1997	Ararat Secondary College
Ardeer High School	Ardeer	1979	1991	Sunshine College
Ardoch High School	St Kilda East	1977	1992	
Ashwood Primary School	Ashwood	1953	1993	Parkhill Primary School
Aspendale Technical School	Aspendale	1959	1992	
Athlone Primary School	Athlone	1909	2013	
Avondale High School	Avondale Heights	1972	1991	
Bald Hills Primary School	Sulky	1878	1993	Miners Rest Primary School
Ballarat East Primary School	Ballarat East	1878	1993	Caledonian Primary School
Ballarat North Technical School	Ballarat North	1955	1994	Ballarat Secondary College
Ballarat Primary School	Ballarat	1853	1992	
Ballendella Primary School	Ballendella	1912	2005	
Balliang Primary School	Balliang	1910	1995	
Balmoral Consolidated School	Balmoral	1859	2008	Balmoral K–12 Community College
Bandiana Primary School	Bandiana	1952	2025	
Bangholme Primary School	Bangholme	1915	1992	
Banksia La Trobe Secondary College	Heidelberg	1954	2011	Charles La Trobe College
Banyule High School	Heidelberg	1961	1994	Viewbank College
Barkers Creek Primary School	Barkers Creek	1875	1993	
Barongarook Primary School	Barongarook	1879	2009	Lavers Hill K–12 College
Barwon Downs Primary School	Barwon Downs	1888	1993	Forrest Primary School
Bayview Primary School	Mount Waverley	1956	1992	Mount Waverley Primary School
Bell Park Technical School	Bell Park	1968	2008	Western Heights College
Bellarine Primary School	Bellarine	1874	1993	
Bellfield Primary School	Bellfield	1951	2011	Charles La Trobe College
Bena Primary School	Bena	1890	2006	
Benalla High School	Benalla	1912	1994	Benalla P–12 College
Benalla West Primary School	Benalla	1960	2013	Benalla P–12 College
Benambra Primary School	Benambra	1876	2002	
Bendigo East Primary School	East Bendigo	1876	1998	Weeroona College Bendigo
Bendigo North Primary School	North Bendigo	1873	2012	Lightning Reef Primary School
Bennettswood Primary School	Bennettswood	1964	1993	Box Hill South Primary School
Bentleigh East Primary School	Bentleigh East	1878	1993	
Berriwillock Primary School	Berriwillock	1895	1994	Tyrrell College
Bessiebelle Primary School	Bessiebelle	1879	2005	
Binginwarri Primary School	Binginwarri	1888	1993	Alberton West and District Primary School
Blackburn East Primary School	Blackburn East	1958	1993	
Blackburn South High School	Blackburn South	1959	1997	Forest Hill College
Blackburn South Primary School	Blackburn South	1920	1989	Orchard Grove Primary School
Blackburn Technical School	Blackburn	1959	1992	
Bobinawarrah East Primary School	Bobinawarrah	1899	1993	
Bonbeach High School	Carrum	1957	1991	Patterson River Secondary College
Bonnie Doon Primary School	Bonnie Doon	1878	1999	
Bookaar Primary School	Bookaar	1908	1993	Camperdown Primary School
Boolarra South Primary School	Boolarra South	1910	1990	
Boorhaman Primary School	Boorhaman	1877	2008	
Boort Primary School	Boort	1877	2013	Boort District P–12 School
Boronia Heights College	Boronia	1973	2014	Boronia K–12 College
Boronia High School	Boronia	1957	1991	
Boronia Primary School	Boronia	1923	2012	Boronia K–12 College
Botanic Park Primary School	Doncaster	1973	1993	
Box Hill Primary School	Box Hill	1887	1993	
Box Hill Technical School	Box Hill	1943	1993	Box Hill Senior Secondary College
Brandon Park Technical School	Wheelers Hill	1978	2003	
Braybrook Primary School	Braybrook	1873	2009	Sunshine Harvester Primary School
Brewster Primary School	Brewster	1924	1993	
Brighton Technical School	Brighton	1922	1991	
Brim Primary School	Brim	1890	2000	
Broadmeadows Secondary College	Broadmeadows	1960	2008	Hume Central Secondary College
Broadmeadows Technical School	Broadmeadows	1961	1992	
Brooklyn Primary School	Brooklyn	1953	1993	Bayside P-12 College
Brunswick East High School	Brunswick	1969	1993	Brunswick Secondary College
Brunswick High School	Brunswick	1964	1993	Brunswick Secondary College
Brunswick Primary School	Brunswick	1873	1996	Brunswick East Primary School
Brunswick West Primary School	Brunswick	1888	1990	
Buckley Primary School	Buckley	1875	1993	Moriac Primary School
Buffalo Primary School	Buffalo	1895	2005	
Bulla Primary School	Bulla	1854	1996	
Bullarook Primary School	Bullarook	1859	1989	
Bulleen Primary School	Bulleen	1961	1993	
Bullengarook Primary School	Bullengarook	1877	2007	
Bunbartha Primary School	Bunbartha	1881	1997	
Bundgeree Primary School	Bundgeree	1888	1992	
Burbank Primary School	Reservoir	1965	2009	Reservoir Views Primary School
Burramine South Primary School	Burramine South	1879	1993	
Burwood Heights High School	Burwood East	1970	1989	Forest Hill College
Burwood High School	Burwood	1955	1987	
Burwood Primary School	Burwood	1865	1989	
Burwood Technical School	Burwood	1956	1989	Forest Hill College
Cabbage Tree Primary School	Cabbage Tree	1913	1993	
Calder Rise Primary School	Keilor	1976	2009	Keilor Views Primary School
Campbellfield Primary School	Campbellfield	1846	1992	
Camperdown Primary School	Camperdown	1854	1994	Camperdown College
Campmeadows Primary School	Broadmeadows	1959	2008	Meadows Primary School
Caramut Primary School	Caramut	1861	2004	Mortlake College P–12
Carpendeit Primary School	Carpendeit	1875	1995	
Carrajung Primary School	Carrajung	1914	1996	Gormandale and District Primary School
Carrajung South Primary School	Carrajung	1898	2012	
Castle Donnington Primary School	Castle Donnington	1912	1993	
Castlemaine Technical School	Castlemaine	1916	2009	Castlemaine Secondary College
Catani Primary School	Catani	1923	1993	Bayles Regional Primary School
Chadstone High School	Chadstone	1962	1991	
Charlton Primary School	Charlton	1875	1994	Charlton College
Cheltenham North Primary School	Cheltenham North	1957	1993	Le Page Primary School
Cheshunt Primary School	Cheshunt	1883	1993	Whitfield District Primary School
Chocolyn Primary School	Chocolyn	1873	1993	Camperdown Primary School
Clarendon Primary School	Clarendon	1978	1993	
Clarkefield Primary School	Clarkefield	1890	2016	
Clayton Primary School	Clayton	1956	2010	
Clayton Technical School	Clayton	1961	1991	South Oakleigh College
Clayton West Primary School	Clayton	1962	2007	Clarinda Primary School
Clear Lake Primary School	Clear Lake	1879	1997	
Cloverlea Primary School	Cloverlea	1906	2006	
Club Terrace Primary School	Club Terrace	1900	1993	
Clyde North Primary School	Clyde North	1858	1992	Wilandra Rise Primary School
Coburg East Primary School	Coburg	1926	1997	
Coburg High School	Coburg	1912	1997	Coburg High School
Coburg Technical School	Coburg	1954	1992	
Coghills Creek Primary School	Coghills Creek	1875	1997	
Colac High School	Colac	1911	2008	Colac Secondary College
Colignan Primary School	Colignan	1927	1993	Nangiloc Colignan & District Primary School
Collingwood Primary School Cambridge Street	Collingwood	1877	1992	
Collingwood Primary School	Collingwood	1882	1995	Collingwood College
Commercial Road Primary School	Morwell	1879	2017	Morwell Central Primary School
Connewarre Primary School	Connewarre	1878	1993	Mount Duneed Regional Primary School
Cooinda Primary School	Glen Waverley	1972	1993	Glen Waverley South Primary School
Coolaroo Primary School	Coolaroo	1976	1992	
Coomboona Primary School	Coomboona	1891	1993	
Coomoora High School	Springvale South	1977	2011	Keysborough Secondary College
Coomoora Primary School	Springvale South	1975	2009	Keysborough Primary School
Corio North High School	Corio	1978	2010	Northern Bay P–12 College
Corio South Primary School	Corio	1965	2013	Northern Bay P–12 College
Costerfield Primary School	Costerfield	1873	1992	
Cressy Primary School	Cressy	1866	2010	
Crinigan Road Primary School	Morwell	1957	2017	Morwell Central Primary School
Croydon High School	Croydon	1957	2018	Melba College
Croydon North Primary School	Croydon North	1878	2010	Croydon Primary School
Croydon South Primary School	Croydon South	1967	2009	Tinternvale Primary School
Crowlands Primary School	Crowlands	1864	1993	
Culgoa Primary School	Culgoa	1895	2008	
Currawa Primary School	Dookie College	1915	2025	
Dallas North Primary School	Dallas	1963	2012	Coolaroo South Primary School
Dallas Primary School	Dallas	1963	2013	Dallas Brooks Community Primary School
Dalyston Primary School	Dalyston	1900	1993	Powlett River Primary School
Dandenong Technical School	Dandenong	1954	1991	
Dargo Primary School	Dargo	1871	2023	
Dawes Road Primary School	Kyabram	1964	2014	
Dean Primary School	Dean	1860	2003	
Denison Primary School	Denison	1923	1993	Nambrok-Denison Primary School
Dennington Primary School	Dennington	1858	1996	Warrnambool West Primary School
Derrinallum Primary School	Derrinallum	1878	1994	Derrinallum P–12 College
Diggers Road Primary School	Werribee South	1927	1993	
Dixie Primary School	Dixie	1868	1992	
Dixons Creek Primary School	Dixons Creek	1875	2021	
Doncaster East Primary School	Doncaster East	1878	1996	Doncaster Gardens Primary School
Doncaster Heights Primary School	Doncaster East	1968	1993	
Doncaster Park Primary School	Doncaster	1962	1996	Templestowe Heights Primary School
Donvale High School	Donvale	1966	1995	Mullauna Secondary College
Dooen Primary School	Dooen	1876	1993	
Doutta Galla Primary School	Niddrie	1953	1996	Aberfeldie Primary School
Doveton High School	Doveton	1960	1992	
Doveton North Primary School	Doveton	1965	2012	Doveton College
Doveton Technical School	Doveton	1963	2008	
Doveton West Primary School	Doveton	1959	1993	
Drummartin Primary School	Drummartin	1874	2015	
Drummond Primary School	Drummond	1877	2021	
Dudley Primary School	Wonthaggi	1911	1993	Powlett River Primary School
Eastmeadows Primary School	Broadmeadows	1960	1996	Meadows Primary School
Eastmont Primary School	Vermont	1964	1996	Rangeview Primary School
Eastmoor Primary School	Bentleigh East	1957	1998	Tucker Road Bentleigh Primary School
Eastville Primary School	Eastville	1873	1996	
Echuca High School	Echuca	1912	2005	Echuca College
Echuca South Primary School	Echuca	1971	2018	Echuca Twin Rivers Primary School
Echuca Village Primary School	Echuca Village	1896	1993	
Echuca West Primary School	Echuca	1915	2018	Echuca Twin Rivers Primary School
Ecklin South Primary School	Ecklin South	1885	1993	
Eddington Primary School	Eddington	1867	1992	
Elaine Primary School	Elaine	1876	1998	
Eldorado Primary School	Eldorado	1861	1993	Tarrawingee Area Primary School
Elingamite North Primary School	Elingamite North	1938	1993	
Ellerslie Primary School	Ellerslie	1874	1992	
Endeavour Hills Secondary College	Endeavour Hills	1969	2012	Doveton College
Ensay Group School	Ensay	1889	1994	Swifts Creek P-12 School
Erica Primary School	Erica	1881	1993	Rawson Primary School
Erinbank Secondary College	Erica	1978	2008	Hume Central Secondary College
Essendon Technical School	Essendon	1939	1992	Essendon Keilor College
Eumemmerring Primary School	Eumemmerring	1976	2012	Doveton College
Eureka Street Primary School	Ballarat East	1870	1993	Canadian Lead Primary School
Everton Upper Primary School	Everton Upper	1873	1994	Everton Primary School
Fairfield North Primary School	Fairfield North	1928	1992	
Fairway Primary School	Frankston	1964	1993	Kananook Primary School
Fawkner North Primary School	Fawkner North	1957	1993	
Fawkner Technical School	Fawkner	1961	1993	Glenroy College
Ferntree Gully High School	Ferntree Gully	1968	2006	
Ferntree Gully Primary School	Ferntree Gully	1874	2006	Wattle View Primary School
Ferntree Gully Technical School	Ferntree Gully	1954	1996	
Fiskville Primary School	Fiskville	1933	1992	
Fitzroy High School	Fitzroy	1957	1992	Fitzroy High School (reopened 2004)
Flemington High School	Flemington	1964	1992	
Flora Hill Primary School	Flora Hill	1952	2007	
Footscray High School / Footscray City College	Yarraville	1954	1996	Footscray High School (reopened 2020)
Framlingham Primary School	Framlingham	1872	1993	Grasmere Primary School
Freshwater Creek Primary School	Freshwater Creek	1856	1993	Mount Duneed Regional Primary School
Fyansford Primary School	Fyansford	1876	1996	Manifolds Heights Primary School
Gardiner Primary School	Gardiner	1915	1992	
Garvoc Primary School	Garvoc	1870	1993	
Geelong East Technical School	Geelong East	1958	2002	Newcomb Secondary College
Geelong North Primary School	Geelong North	1977	1996	Herne Hill Primary School
Geelong Primary School (Swanston Street)	Geelong	1871	1993	
Geelong Technical School (Moorabool Street)	Geelong	1913	c. 1994	
Geelong Technical School (Reynolds Road)	Belmont	c. 1970s	1996	
Geelong West Technical School	Geelong West	1954	2011	Western Heights College
Gellibrand Primary School	Gellibrand	1890	2008	Lavers Hill K-12 College
Genoa Primary School	Genoa	1891	1990	
Gerang Primary School	Gerang Gerung	1884	1993	
Gerangamete Primary School	Gerangamete	1874	2001	
Gilmore College for Girls	Footscray	1925	2019	Footscray High School
Glen Devon Primary School	Werribee	1964	2011	Wyndham Park Primary
Glen Waverley Primary School	Glen Waverley	1880	1993	
Glen Waverley Heights Primary School	Glen Waverley	1960	1993	Glen Waverley Primary School
Glenburn Primary School	Glenburn	1902	1993	
Glengala Park Primary School	Sunshine West	1976	2000	
Glengarry West Primary School	Glengarry West	1929	1993	
Glenlyon Primary School	Glenlyon	1861	1993	
Glenmore Primary School	Glenmore	1911	1993	
Glenorchy Primary School	Glenorchy	1875	2010	
Glenroy High School	Glenroy	1954	1993	Glenroy College
Glenroy North Primary School	Glenroy North	1956	2014	Glenroy Central Primary School
Glenroy Primary School	Glenroy	1891	2014	Glenroy Central Primary School
Glenthompson Primary School	Glenthompson	1869	2013	Dunkeld Consolidated School
Gnarwarre Primary School	Gnarwarre	1875	1990	
Gnotuk Primary School	Gnotuk	1902	1993	Camperdown Primary School
Golden Point Primary School	Ballarat East	1875	1993	Canadian Lead Primary School
Golden Square High School	Golden Square	1960	2008	
Golden Square Primary School (Laurel Street)	Golden Square	1875	2014	Golden Square Primary School (Maple Street)
Goongerah Primary School	Goongerah	1936	2018	
Goorambat Primary School	Goorambat	1891	2012	
Gowerville Primary School	Preston	1959	1993	Preston South Primary School
Gowrie Park Primary School	Glenroy	1962	1996	Belle Vue Park Primary School
Granya Primary School	Granya	1880	1994	
Gravel Hill Primary School	Gravel Hill	1875	1992	
Greenbrook Primary School	Epping	1977	2011	Epping Primary School (Greenbrook Campus)
Greenslopes Primary School	Dandenong North	1962	2010	Lyndale Greens Primary School
Grenville Primary School	Grenville	1872	1990	
Greythorn High School	Balwyn North	1958	1992	Balwyn High School
Grimshaw Primary School	Bundoora	1871	1993	
Hadfield High School	Hadfield	1964	1993	Glenroy College
Hadfield Primary School	Hadfield	1857	1996	Belle Vue Park Primary School
Hallora Primary School	Hallora	1881	1994	Lardner and District Primary School
Hallston Primary School	Hallston	1887	1990	Mirboo North Primary School
Hansonville Primary School	Hansonville	1875	1993	Greta Valley Primary School
Harcourt North Primary School	Harcourt North	1921	1994	Harcourt Valley Primary School
Hawkesdale Primary School	Hawkesdale	1866	1993	Hawkesdale P–12 College
Hawksburn Primary School	Prahran	1875	1993	
Hawthorn Secondary College	Hawthorn	1974	2013	Auburn High School (reopened 2014)
Hazelwood Estate Primary School	Hazelwood	1926	1993	
Heatherdale Primary School	Mitcham	1963	1993	Rangeview Primary School
Heatherton Primary School	Heatherton	1870	1999	
Heathmont Primary School	Heathmont	1952	1997	Great Ryrie Primary School
Heidelberg Heights Primary School	Heidelberg Heights	1957	1993	
Heidelberg Technical School	Heidelberg West	1954	1989	Charles La Trobe College
Heidelberg West (Haig Street) Primary School	Heidelberg West	1925	2011	Charles La Trobe College
Highett Primary School	Highett	1953	1993	
Hillcrest Secondary College	Highett	1967	2008	Hume Central Secondary College
Hopetoun Primary School	Hopetoun	1892	2013	Hopetoun P–12 College
Huntingdale High School	Huntingdale	1959	1992	South Oakleigh Secondary College
Hurstbridge High School	Hurstbridge	1966	1999	Diamond Valley College
Iona Primary School	Verdale	1894	1993	
Irrewarra Primary School	Irrewarra	1923	1993	
Johnsonville Primary School	Johnsonville	1886	1998	
Jordanville South Primary School	Chadstone	1953	1993	Parkhill Primary School
Jung Primary School	Jung	1876	1993	
Kalimna West Primary School	Kalimna West	1900	1992	Lakes Entrance Primary School
Kalkallo Primary School	Kalkallo	1855	1993	
Kalkee Primary School	Kalkee	1877	1993	
Karingal High School	Frankston	1959	1999	McClelland College
Katunga South Primary School	Katunga	1880	2021	
Keon Park Technical School	Reservoir	1958	1992	
Keon Park Primary School	Reservoir	1955	2008	Reservoir Views Primary School
Kergunyah South Primary School	Kergunyah South	1888	1992	
Kerrie Primary School	Kerrie	1874	1993	
Kewell Primary School	Kewell	1879	1990	
Keysborough Park Primary School	Keysborough	1979	2009	Keysborough Primary School
Keysborough Primary School	Keysborough	1869	1993	
Keysborough Technical School	Keysborough	1975	1992	
Killoura Primary School	Burwood East	1971	1991	Orchard Grove Primary School
Kilmany South Primary School	Kilmany	1913	1991	Wurruk Primary School
Kilsyth East Primary School	Kilsyth	1971	1993	
Kingsbury Technical School	Kingsbury	1963	1997	Reservoir High School
Kingston Primary School	Kingston	1865	2004	
Kirkstall Primary School	Kirkstall	1862	1993	
Knowsley Primary School	Knowsley	1879	1990	
Knox Technical School	Knox	1966	1992	
Knoxfield Primary School	Knoxfield	1968	1993	Darrang Primary School
Koonung Heights Primary School	Mont Albert North	1954	1993	Box Hill North Primary School
Koonwarra Primary School	Koonwarra	1893	1993	
Korong Vale Primary School	Korong Vale	1877	1999	Wedderburn College
Korweinguboora Primary School	Korweinguboora	1878	1993	
Krowera Primary School	Krowera	1889	1992	
Kyvalley Primary School	Kyvalley	1887	1992	
La Trobe High School	Bundoora	1958	1989	Charles La Trobe College
Laanecoorie Primary School	Laanecoorie	1864	1993	
Laang Primary School	Laang	1875	1997	
Lakeside Primary School	Reservoir	1962	1993	William Ruthven Primary School
Lakeside Secondary College	Reservoir	1959	2009	William Ruthven Secondary College
Lalor Park Primary School	Lalor	1970	2012	Lalor Gardens Primary School
Lalor Technical School	Lalor	1968	1990	Peter Lalor Secondary College
Lalor West Primary School	Lalor	1973	2009	Lalor Gardens Primary School
Larpent Primary School	Larpent	1903	1995	Colac South West Primary School
Laverton Park Primary School	Laverton	1955	1993	Laverton P-12 College
Leichardt Primary School	Leichardt	1874	1993	
Leongatha South Primary School	Leongatha South	1893	1991	Leongatha Primary School
Little Hampton Primary School	Little Hampton	1876	1993	Trentham District Primary
Long Gully Primary School	Long Gully	1879	1992	
Longlea Primary School	Longlea	1877	1993	Axedale Primary School
Longwarry North Primary School	Longwarry North	1926	1993	
Lovely Banks Primary School	Lovely Banks	1875	1996	Hamlyn Banks Primary School
Lubeck Primary School	Lubeck	1883	1990	
Macleod Primary School	Macleod	1925	1997	Macleod College
Macleod Technical School	Macleod	1960	2007	Charles La Trobe College
Macorna Primary School	Macorna	1892	1990	
Maidstone Primary School	Maidstone	1951	1996	Dinjerra Primary School
Mailors Flat Primary School	Mailors Flat	1873	1994	
Malvern Girls High School	Malvern	1946	1993	Melbourne Girls College
Mandurang Primary School	Mandurang	1877	1994	
Manningham Park Primary School	Lower Templestowe	1997	2009	Templestowe Heights Primary School
Marcus Hill Primary School	Marcus Hill	1878	1993	
Mardan South Primary School	Mardan	1892	1993	
Maribyrnong Primary School	Maribyrnong	1912	1993	
McGuire College	Shepparton	1966	2020	Greater Shepparton Secondary College
Mead Primary School	Mead	1912	1992	
Meadowbank Primary School	Broadmeadows	1997	2008	Meadows Primary School
Meerlieu Primary School	Meerlieu	1883	2021	
Meringur Primary School	Meringur	1927	1997	
Merlynston Primary School	Coburg North	1928	1993	
Merrilands Primary School	Reservoir	1959	1997	William Ruthven Primary School
Merrilands College	Reservoir	1957	1996	William Ruthven Secondary College
Merton Primary School	Merton	1875	1996	
Metcalfe Primary School	Metcalfe	1866	1993	
Middlefield Primary School	Blackburn North	1962	1991	Old Orchard Primary School
Millbrook Primary School	Millbrook	1877	1993	
Mimosa Primary School	Glen Waverley	1973	1994	
Mincha West Primary School	Mincha West	1877	1990	
Mirrabooka Primary School	Blackburn South	1962	1989	Orchard Grove Primary School
Mitcham Technical School	Mitcham	1965	1996	Mullauna College
Mitiamo Primary School	Mitiamo	1884	1993	
Mitre Primary School	Mitre	1882	1993	
Modella Primary School	Modella	1903	1993	
Moe High School	Moe	1953	1994	Lowanna College
Monash Secondary College	Notting Hill	1965	2006	
Monterey High School	Frankston North	1966	1994	Monterey Secondary College
Moorabbin West Primary School	Moorabbin	1950	1992	
Moorilim Primary School	Moorilim	1875	1994	
Moorleigh High School	Bentleigh East	1966	1992	South Oakleigh College
Mooroolbark Primary School	Mooroolbark	1928	2004	
Mooroopna North West Primary School	Mooroopna	1878	1996	
Mooroopna Secondary College	Shepparton	1972	2020	Greater Shepparton Secondary College
Moreland High School	Moreland	1953	1991	
Mornington High School	Mornington	1956	1999	Mornington Secondary College
Mortlake Primary School	Mortlake	1858	1995	Mortlake P-12 College
Mortlake Secondary College	Mortlake	1961	1993	Mortlake P-12 College
Morwell (Collins Street) Primary School	Morwell	1951	1992	
Morwell Technical School	Morwell	1959	1992	Kurnai Secondary College
Mount Prospect Primary School	Mount Prospect	1862	1993	
Mount Taylor Primary School	Mount Taylor	1904	1993	
Mount Wallace Primary School	Mount Wallace	1871	1997	
Munro Primary School	Munro	1913	1993	
Murraydale Primary School	Murraydale	1913	1993	Beverford District Primary School
Murrayville Primary School	Murrayville	1912	1994	Murrayville Community College
Murrumbeena High School	Murrumbeena	1958	1996	Glen Eira College
Musk Primary School	Musk	1872	1993	
Muskerry East Primary School	Muskerry East	1878	1993	
Myall Primary School	Myall	1896	1993	
Myrtlebank Primary School	Myrtlebank	1880	1993	Bundalaguah Primary School
Mywee Primary School	Mywee	1894	1991	
Nandaly Primary School	Nandaly	1916	1994	Tyrrell College
Naringal Primary School	Naringal	1877	1993	Allansford and District Primary School
Narmara Primary School	Burwood East	1967	1992	
Narrawong East Primary School	Narrawong East	1887	1993	Narrawong District Primary School
Neerim East Primary School	Neerim East	1892	1994	Neerim District Rural Primary School
Nelson Primary School	Nelson	1875	1990	
Newborough High School	Newborough	1962	1994	Lowanna College
Newbridge Primary School	Newbridge	1861	1996	
Newcomb South Primary School	Newcomb South	1976	1997	Newcomb Primary School
Newlands High School	Coburg	1960	1992	
Nilma North Primary School	Nilma North	1929	1996	Warragul Primary School
Noble Park Technical School	Noble Park	1957	1994	Noble Park Secondary College
Noojee Primary School	Noojee	1922	2025	
Noradjuha Primary School	Noradjuha	1877	1996	
Norlane Primary School	Norlane	1955	1996	
Normanville Primary School	Normanville	1894	1992	
Northcote Technical School	Northcote	1966	1998	Thornbury High School
North Melbourne Primary School (Boundary Road)	North Melbourne	1883	1996	
Northvale Primary School	Mulgrave	1971	1993	Albany Rise Primary School
Norwood Primary School	Ringwood North	1956	1993	
Nunawading High School	Nunawading	1955	1997	Forest Hill College
Nyah Primary School	Nyah	1896	1997	Nyah District Primary School
Oakleigh High School	Oakleigh	1955	1992	
Oakleigh Technical School	Oakleigh	1946	1991	
Oak Park High School	Oak Park	1959	1997	Glenroy College
Orbost Primary School	Orbost	1886	2023	
Orbost North Primary School	Orbost	1957	2023	
Outtrim Primary School	Outtrim	1895	1993	
Overland Primary School	Keilor East	1974	1993	
Parklands Primary School	Airport West	1958	1993	Niddrie Primary School
Pimpinio Primary School	Pimpinio	1874	1996	Dimboola Primary School
Pine Lodge Primary School	Pine Lodge	1878	1995	
Plenty Primary School	Plenty	1922	1993	
Pomborneit North Primary School	Pomborneit North	1915	1990	
Poowong East Primary School	Poowong East	1911	1995	Poowong Consolidated School
Poowong North Primary School	Poowong North	1922	1994	Poowong Consolidated School
Port Albert Primary School	Port Albert	1873	1994	Yarram Primary School
Port Melbourne Primary School (Nott Street)	Port Melbourne	1974	1992	Port Melbourne Primary School
Port Welshpool Primary School	Port Welshpool	1900	1993	Welshpool and District Primary School
Portland High School	Portland	1945	1993	Portland Secondary College
Powelltown Primary School	Powelltwon	1917	1993	
Prahran High School	Prahran	1966	1996	Glen Eira College
Prahran Primary School	Prahran	1888	1990	Windsor Primary School
Preston East High School	Preston	1964	1997	Reservoir High School
Preston Girls High School	Preston	1928	2013	Preston High School (reopened 2019)
Preston Technical School	Preston	1937	1996	
Purnim Primary School	Purnim	1871	1993	
Purrumbete South Primary School	Purrumbete South	1877	1993	
Quantong Primary School	Quantong	1893	1997	
Queenscliff High School	Queenscliff	1945	1998	Bellarine Secondary College
Raglan Primary School	Raglan	1861	1996	
Redbank Primary School	Redbank	1867	1993	
Richards Street Primary School	Ballarat East	1969	1997	Canadian Lead Primary School
Richmond Girls High School	Richmond	1926	1993	Melbourne Girls College
Richmond High School	Richmond	1967	1992	Richmond High School (reopened 2018)
Richmond Technical School	Richmond	1926	1992	
Ringwood Primary School	Ringwood	1889	1997	Great Ryrie Primary School
Ringwood Technical School	Ringwood	1958	1993	Heathmont College
Ringwood East Primary School	Ringwood East	1924	1993	
Rosebank Primary School	Reservoir	1968	1992	
Rosehill Park Primary School	Keilor East	1968	1993	
Ross Bridge Primary School	Rossbridge	1872	1993	Maroona Primary School
Rushworth Primary School	Rushworth	1872	1996	Rushworth P–12 College
St Germains Primary School	St Germains	1875	1994	
St Helens Primary School	St Helens	1876	1993	
St James Primary School	St James	1884	1993	
Sale Technical School	Sale	1885	1996	Sale College (Macalister Campus)
Sarsfield Primary School	Sarsfield	1873	1993	
Scoresby Heights Primary School	Scoresby	1972	1994	Darrang Primary School
Seaford Carrum Secondary College	Carrum	1967	1991	Patterson River Secondary College
Sea Lake Primary School	Sea Lake	1896	1994	Tyrrell College
Sebastian Primary School	Sebastian	1875	1993	
Sedgwick Primary School	Sedgwick	1867	1990	
Shepparton Technical School	Shepparton	1953	1993	
Silvan South Primary School	Silvan South	1926	1992	
South Melbourne Primary School (Dorcas Street)	South Melbourne	1873	1996	Albert Park Primary School
South Melbourne Primary School (Eastern Road)	South Melbourne	1877	1991	
South Melbourne Technical School	South Melbourne	1918	1992	
Southwood Primary School	Ringwood	1965	1997	Great Ryrie Primary School
Speed Primary School	Speed	1914	1993	Tempy Primary School
Speewa Primary School	Speewa	1924	1993	Beverford District Primary School
Spring Valley Primary School	Springvale South	1975	2009	Spring Parks Primary School
Springvale North Primary School	Springvale North	1875	1993	Albany Rise Primary School
Springvale West Primary School	Springvale	1969	2009	Spring Parks Primary School
Steels Creek Primary School	Steels Creek	1886	1992	
Stewart Primary School	Red Cliffs	1935	1993	Red Cliffs Primary School
Strath Creek Primary School	Strath Creek	1892	1994	
Strathdownie Primary School	Strathdownie	1889	1996	Casterton Primary School
Streatham Primary School	Streatham	1866	1998	
Studfield Primary School	Studfield	1965	1993	Yawarra Primary School
Sunshine High School	Sunshine	1955	1991	Sunshine College
Sutherlands Creek Primary School	Sutherlands Creek	1877	1990	
Swan Marsh Primary School	Swan Marsh	1904	2011	
Swinburne Technical School	Hawthorn	1913	1992	Swinburne Senior Secondary College
Sydenham West Primary School	Sydenham	1914	1993	Toolern Vale and District Primary School
Syndal High School	Syndal	1967	1996	Glen Waverley Secondary College
Syndal Primary School	Syndal	1953	1992	
Syndal Technical School	Syndal	1958	1994	Glen Waverley Secondary College
Talindert Primary School	Camperdown	1910	1993	
Tarrawingee (Area) Primary School	Tarrawingee	1872	1998	
Templestowe High School	Templestowe	1960	1993	Templestowe College
Templestowe Primary School	Templestowe	1874	1993	
Tobruk Street Primary School - Morwell	Morwell	1954	2017	
Toolamba West Primary School	Toolamba West	1885	1993	
Toolleen Primary School	Toolleen	1874	1990	
Tottenham Primary School	Tottenham	1953	1993	Dinjerra Primary School
Tottenham Technical School	Tottenham	1957	1991	Sunshine College
Trafalgar East Primary School	Trafalgar East	1905	1995	
Trafalgar South Primary School	Trafalgar South	1883	c. 1995	
Tragowel Primary School	Tragowel	1880	1997	
Traralgon Technical School	Traralgon	1960	1993	Traralgon Secondary College
Tresco Primary School	Tresco	1914	1992	
Tyntynder Primary School	Tyntynder	1913	1992	
Tyntynder South Primary School	Tyntynder South	1892	1993	Beverford District Primary School
Upfield Primary School	Broadmeadows	1970	2010	Dallas Brooks Community Primary School
Victoria Park Primary School	Abbotsford	1889	1992	
Vinifera Primary School	Vinifera	1924	1993	Woorinen District Primary School
Waaia Yalca South Primary School	Waaia	1994	2023	
Wallacedale North Primary School	Wallacedale	1900	1993	Branxholme-Wallacedale Community School
Wandin East Primary School	Wandin East	1916	1992	
Wanganui Park Secondary College	Shepparton	1966	2020	Greater Shepparton Secondary College
Wangoom Primary School	Wangoom	1865	1992	
Wantirna Heights Primary School	Wantrina	1974	1997	
Warragul West Primary School	Warragul West	1889	1994	Lardner and District Primary School
Warrawong Primary School	Blackburn South	1960	1990	Orchard Grove Primary School
Warrnambool South Primary School	Warrnambool	1877	1994	
Watsonia High School	Watsonia	1962	1992	Greensborough College
Watsonia South Primary School	Watsonia	1971	1993	Streeton Primary School
Wattle Park High School	Wattle Park	1962	1992	
Waverley High School	Mount Waverley	1956	c. 1995	Mount Waverley Secondary College
Waverley North Primary School	Mount Waverley	1962	1993	Mount Waverley North Primary School
Waverley Park Primary School	Mulgrave	1973	1996	Albany Rise Primary School
Wedderburn Primary School	Wedderburn	1865	1999	Wedderburn College
Weerite Primary School	Weerite	1901	1993	Camperdown Primary School
Wellington Primary School	Mulgrave	1968	1996	Brandon Park Primary
Welton Primary School	Torrumbarry	1921	2017	
Werribee Park Primary School	Werribee South	1994	1997	
Werribee South Primary School	Werribee	1915	1993	
West Melbourne Primary School	West Melbourne	1875	1992	
Westmere Primary School	Westmere	1914	1993	
Westside Primary School	Springvale	1957	1993	
Whitehorse Girls Technical School	Box Hill	1924	1984	Box Hill Technical School
Willung Primary School	Willung	1880	1993	
Windsor Technical School	Windsor	1980	1992	
Wollert Primary School	Wollert	1877	1993	Wollert Primary School (rebuilt and opened 2020)
Won Wron Primary School	Won Wron	1877	1995	
Woods Point Primary School	Woods Point	1865	1998	Jamieson Primary School
Woomelang Group School	Woomelang	1900	2018	
Woorinen Primary School	Woorinen	1917	1993	Woorinen District Primary School
Woorinen North Primary School	Woorinen North	1925	1993	Woorinen District Primary School
Woorinen South Primary School	Woorinen South	1930	1993	Woorinen District Primary School
Yalca South Primary School	Yalca South	1880	1993	Waaia Yalca South Primary School
Yalla-y-Poora Primary School	Yalla-y-Poora	1956	1993	Maroona Primary School
Yallambie Primary School	Yallambie	1971	1993	Streeton Primary School
Yallourn Technical School	Newborough East	1928	1994	Lowanna College
Yanac Primary School	Yanac	1889	1993	
Yanakie Primary School	Yanakie	1960	1993	Fish Creek and District Primary School
Yarack Primary School	Yarack	1874	1993	
Yarra Park Primary School	East Melbourne	1874	1988	
Yarraleen Primary School	Bulleen	1975	1992	
Yarraville Primary School	Yarraville	1875	1994	
Yellingbo Primary School	Yellingbo	1954	2017	
Yendon Primary School	Yendon	1864	1993	
Yeodene Primary School	Yeodene	1872	1993	
