= Auburn South Primary School =

Primary school in Victoria, Australia

Location
- 419 Tooronga Road, Hawthorn East, Victoria, Australia; 37.83967°S 145.04473°E

Information
- Motto: Inquire, Create, Flourish
- Established: 1925
- Principal: Travis Paterson
- Years offered: Prep–Year 6
- Enrolment: 581 (2023)
- Colours: Turquoise; Blue; White
- Website: Official Website

The Auburn South Primary School is public co-educational primary school located in the Melbourne suburb of Hawthorn East, Victoria, Australia. It is administered by the Victorian Department of Education, with an enrolment of 581 students and a teaching staff of 54, as of 2023. The school serves students from Prep to Year 6.

It was listed as a significant place by the City of Boroondara in February 2021 due to its historical, architectural and aesthetic significance to the local area.

== History ==
The land was acquired in 1921 by the Education Department and was designed by E. Evan Smith. The first head teacher, William Hardy, was appointed on 27 January 1925 and the school was officially opened by the minister of education at the time, Alexander Peacock on 26 February 1925. The cost of the school was £11,800.

A fair was conducted in 1927 to gain funds to build the school's library and in 1928 a playground was constructed by the Hawthorn City Council for the students.

The students raised £20 for the Lord Mayor's 1950 Hospitals Appeal in 1950. It was stated "that this effort by the children should give a lead to adults".

In 2024, a 40-year-old P-plater, who was a mother of a student at the school, accidentally crashed through the school fence while trying to perform a U-turn, killing an 11-year-old boy and injuring four others in the process. A similar incident occurred in 1939 when a learner driver killed a 9-year-old girl just outside the school grounds.

== Demographics ==
In 2023, the school had a student enrolment of 581 with 54 teachers (40.8 full-time equivalent) and 24 non-teaching staff (14.9 full-time equivalent). Female enrolments consisted of 249 students and Male enrolments consisted of 332 students; Indigenous enrolments accounted for a total of 0% and 39% of students had a language background other than English.

== See also ==
- Education in Victoria
- List of government schools in Victoria, Australia
