= Taylors Lakes Secondary College =

Secondary school in Victoria, Australia

Location
- Taylors Lakes, Victoria; Australia; 37°42′26″S 144°47′38″E

Information
- Type: Secondary school
- Motto: Learn and Achieve Together
- Established: 1992
- Principal: Danny Dedes
- Grades: 7–12
- Enrolment: 1050
- Colour: Blue
- Website: www.tlsc.vic.edu.au

Taylors Lakes Secondary College (TLSC) is a public co-educational secondary school located in the Melbourne suburb of Taylors Lakes, Victoria, Australia. It is administered by the Victorian Department of Education, with an enrolment of 1,306 students and about teaching staff of 119 as of 2024. The school serves students from Year 7 to Year 12.

== Notable alumni ==
- Cameron Rayner – Australian Rules Footballer
- Dayne Kelly – Professional Tennis Player
- Chris Mitrevski - Olympic Track and Field Athlete

== See also ==
- Education in Victoria
- List of government schools in Victoria, Australia
