= Noble Park Secondary College =

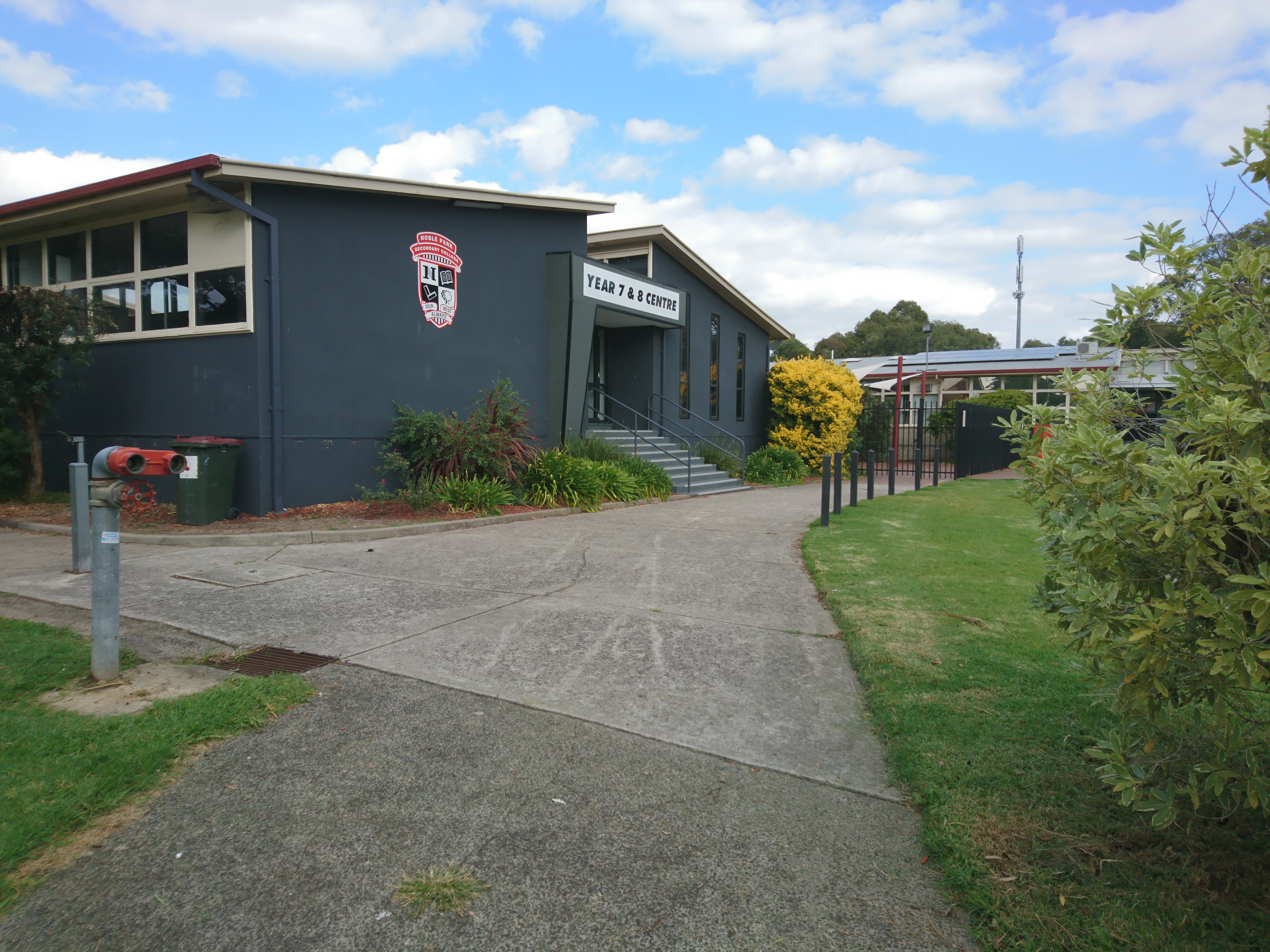

Location
- 3 Callaghan St; Noble Park, Victoria, Australia; 37°58′14.3688″S 145°10′44.4936″E

Information
- Type: Government, coeducation
- Motto: Our best, always
- Established: 1962
- Principal: Pam Dyson
- Grades: 7–12
- Colours: Red and black
- Website: www.nobleparksc.vic.edu.au

Noble Park Secondary College is a secondary 7–12 co-educational school in Noble Park, Melbourne. According to the school, they have enrolled over 40 different nationalities into the school, with 44% of the students being born outside Australia. Its sister school is Shinminato Senior High School.

== History ==
Noble Park High School was opened by the Department of Education in 1962, following the opening of the nearby Noble Park Technical School in 1957. The school's buildings were constructed by AVJennings in the Light Timber Construction (LTC) style, and clad with pebble-encrusted cement tiles. The cost of the contract for the first and second sections of the school was £84,389. The third section was constructed later, providing the school with two LTC classroom wings and an LTC technical block, all of which remain in use today.

In the early 1990s, the school's name was changed to Noble Park Secondary College, and the Noble Park Technical School was closed.

== Grounds and facilities ==
The school contains three light timber construction wings ('A', 'B' & 'C') as well as an administration wing, a library and a hall.

NPSC also features a separate basketball & tennis courts, a hockey field (though it is more commonly used for Soccer) and a football oval, with a cricket pitch featured inside of it during the cricket season.

== Uniform ==
The Noble Park Secondary College uniform is white shirts, red jumpers and black pants for Yrs 7–10. For VCE students, it is the same however a black jumper is worn. This is to distinguish them from the junior years.

== Student representation ==
The school's main form of student representation is via the SRC (Student Representative Council). Elections are held in Late February, with students elected from their subsequent form class. Up to 2 students can be elected from any one form, resulting in around 10 students nominated throughout each year level. After this stage, the entire year level conducts in a secret ballot, and from that 3 students are elected for each year level.

SRC members play an important role amongst the school population, deciding on important matters that have been either been brought up by members or by the School Council, a group of parents, teachers and the principal.
