= Neerim District Secondary College =

Coordinates: 38°01′09″S 145°57′36″E

Neerim District Secondary College is a small rural high school in Neerim South, Baw Baw, Victoria, Australia. The school holds 226 pupils aged 7–12 and opened in 1961.

Jacqui Veal is the Principal (2020), supported by Assistant Principal and the NDSC leadership team.

In July 2014 a former principal, Michaela Cole, took up the role of Principal of Officer Secondary College, which opened in January 2015.

In 1988 the school Shire Council started to provide Community Libraries, and soon after opened their library to both members of the school and local community every weekday and Saturdays. In 1988 a Distance Education (Telematics) Program began that linked five local Secondary Colleges. To provide vocational subjects, the school soon after opened a metal workshop and a machine room. In 1989, the school opened a physical education facility, and in 1995 the school opened a new gymnasium. Funds for these projects were raised by a joint effort including the college, the Primary School, and the Buln Buln Council. Also, the local community provided funding for the centre.
