= Hampton Park Secondary College =

Location
- 58–96 Fordholm Rd, Hampton Park VIC 3976; Victoria; Australia; 38°2′6″S 145°15′33″E

Information
- Type: Secondary state school
- Principal: Wayne Haworth
- Teaching staff: 98
- Enrollment: 1184 ( as of end of 2024)
- Assistant Principals: Eloise Haynes, Ayman Youssef, Karen Shiel, Paul Broecker
- Website: http://www.hpsc.vic.edu.au/

Hampton Park Secondary College is a secondary college in Melbourne. It was established in 1986, and is located next to River Gum Primary School.
