= Seymour College (Victoria) =

Location
- Stewart Street; Seymour, Victoria; 3660; Australia

Information
- Type: Government
- Principal: Debbie Oliver
- Years offered: Prep–12
- Website: http://www.seymourcollege.vic.edu.au/

Seymour College is the government school in Seymour, Victoria, Australia, catering for students from Prep (now called "Foundation") to Year 12. It also provides trade training for students in mechanics and engineering in the form of VET courses, Seymour College also incorporates special school services. (Including a Hydro Therapy Pool)

== History ==
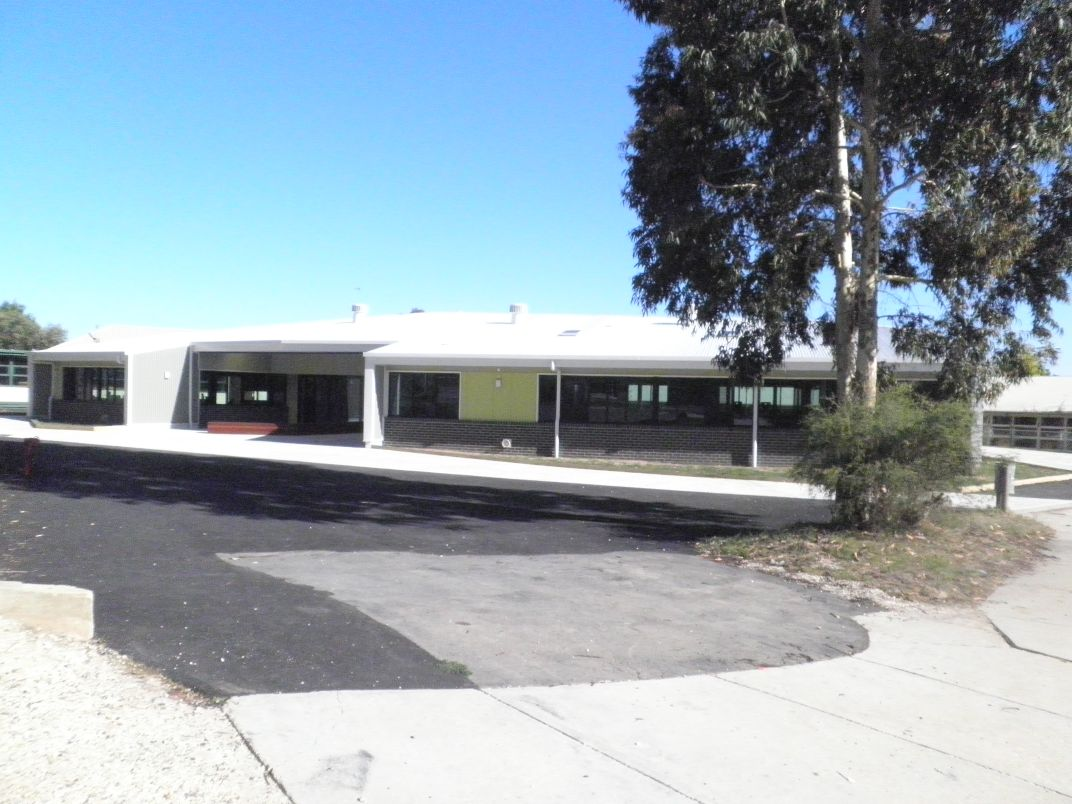
The school's new Science Centre

The school was created in 2010 through a merger of Seymour Technical High School (STHS) (1948), Seymour Primary School (SPS), Seymour East Primary School (SEPS) and Seymour Special School (SSS). Major building works for Stage 1 were completed (as of 2012). During 2019 the Stage 2 building works were commenced and completed this included the (7–10 Learning Building) and a new Food Technology / Canteen addition to the existing stadium. All of the previous schools are now on the one site, under the one banner "Seymour College".

The school initially operated under the interim name of Seymour P–12 College until the new name of Seymour College was approved in October 2011.

== Campus ==
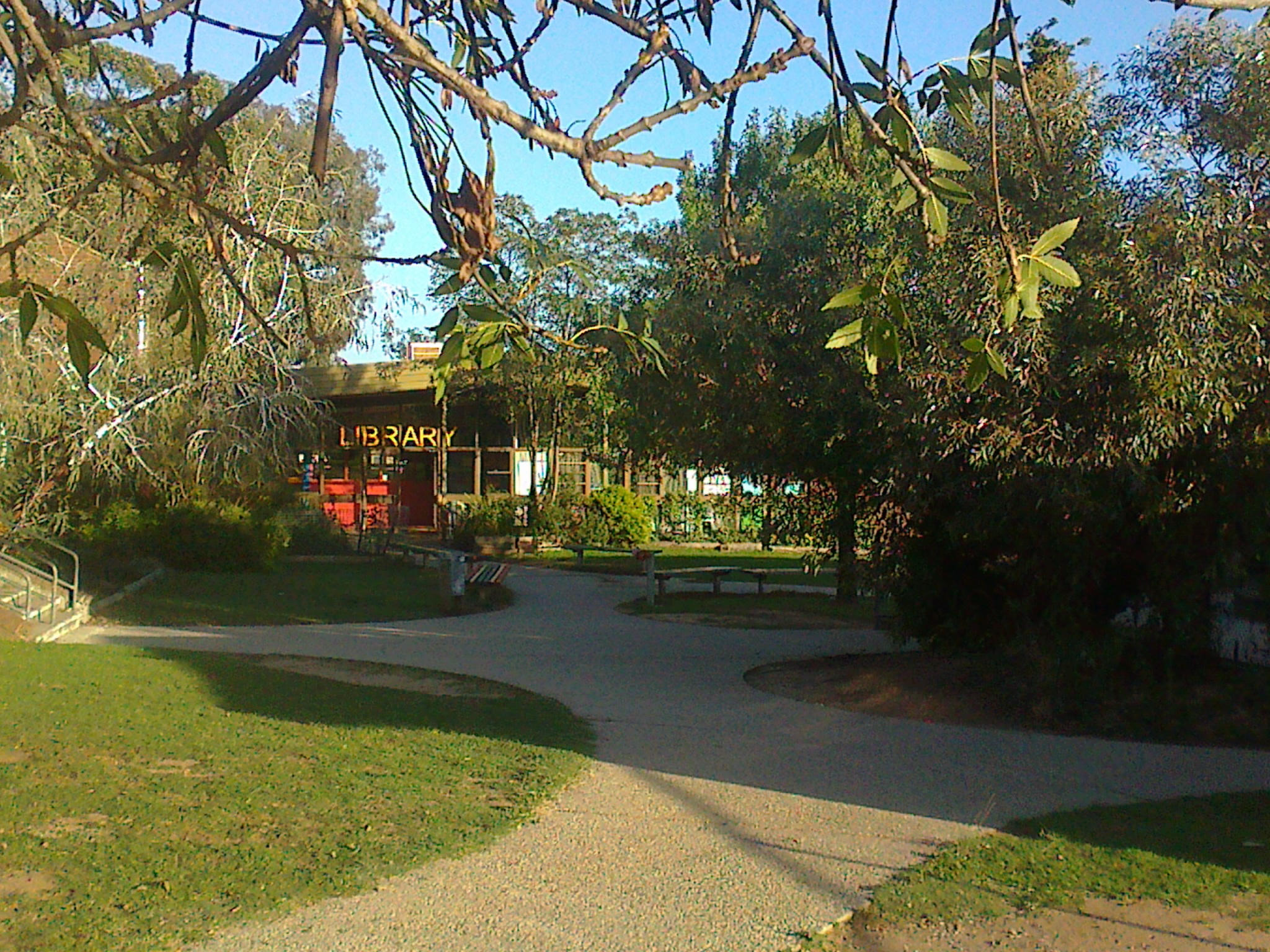
Library area

Building works completed in 2012 enabled the whole school to consolidate at a single site in Loco Street.

As of 2016 all the government schools in Seymour have been incorporated into Seymour College.

The campus has 2 main areas. These are the high school area (7–12) and the primary school area (F–6). There is a canteen in the high school.

== Performance ==
Seymour College in 2016 and 2017 performed above other schools in terms of the average ATAR score obtained by students who successfully complete year 12/VCE. The median score reported by the Better Education VCE Independent School Ranking – 2016 was 27.
