= Braybrook College =

Coordinates: 37°46′41.23″S 144°50′54.45″E

- Braybrook, Victoria; Australia

Information
- School type: Public, co-educational, secondary day school
- Motto: Pride in Achievement
- Established: 1960
- Principal: Kelly Panousieris
- Grades: 7–12
- Enrolment: 1424
- Colours: Navy blue, maroon and white
- Website: braybrooksc.vic.edu.au

Braybrook College is a state secondary college located in the suburb of Braybrook which is located in Melbourne's western suburbs.

== About the school ==
Braybrook College is a Year 7–12, Single campus, co-educational, multicultural, Years 7 to 12 college, largely serving the areas of Sunshine and Footscray.

The school is well-resourced with facilities including Computer Labs, Numeracy Centre, Music Centre, Drama Centre, Gymnasium, Library, Careers Centre, Food/Home Economics Centre, Woodwork Centre and Machine Workshop, Ceramics and Arts Studios, Science Laboratories, Canteen, Synthetic Soccer Pitch, Landscaped gardens, and a covered BBQ area.

The school also has a range of special programs, including an International Students Program, a Program for Students with a Disability, an EAL Program, a "Student at Risk" Program, a Literacy Program, a STEM Program, a Peer Support Program and a Program for High Achievers' (SEEK).

== History ==
The school was founded as Braybrook High School, then changed its name from Braybrook Secondary College to Braybrook College.

== Achievements ==
Braybrook College graduate Linh Do, defeated seven other nominees from across the state to win the 2008 VCE Achiever of the Year Award, which honors student community contributions. The 18-year-old attended Kevin Rudd’s 2020 Youth Summit and Al Gore’s climate-change leadership training, and then started her own climate change organisation.
