= Reservoir High School (Victoria) =

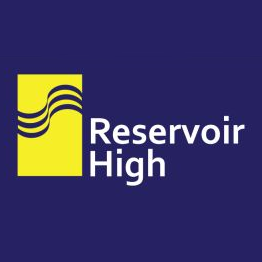

Location
- 855 Plenty Road; Reservoir, Victoria; Australia; 37°43′20″S 145°1′46″E

Information
- Type: Public state secondary college
- Motto: Diversity – Excellence – Success
- Established: 1958
- Principal: Katie Watmough
- Grades: 7–12
- Gender: co-educational
- Colours: Blue, red and yellow
- Nickname: Reservoir High
- Website: http://www.reservoirhs.vic.edu.au/

Reservoir High School is a medium-sized co-educational, year 7 to 12 public high school, with approximately 700 students in Reservoir, Victoria, Australia.

The school has a well established International Student Program. The program includes students from a range of countries such as China, Vietnam, Nepal, Thailand, India and Saudi Arabia.

Reservoir High School is one of a select group of secondary colleges to be accredited to offer advanced learning classes (SEAL or Select Entry Accelerated Learning).

In 2021, Reservoir High was recognised by the Age newspaper as a 'School that Excels' due to the continued improvement of its students' achievements and results in the Victorian Certificate of Education.

Reservoir High has undergone a renewal of its teaching spaces and grounds. This includes the construction of a 250 seat Performing Arts Centre, a new Senior School building, 5 external competition grade netball courts (as well as the 4 internal courts as part of the joint use agreement on the Darebin Sports Stadium) and added in 2022 a new Visual Arts and Technology building. The facilities support all students to achieve at their best in a wide range of pathway programs which are designed to promote the passions, talents and interests of a diverse variety of students.

== See also ==
- List of schools in Victoria
- Victorian Certificate of Education
