= Beaufort Secondary College =

Coordinates: 37°26′14″S 143°22′56″E

- Beaufort, Victoria; Australia

Information
- School type: Public, co-educational, secondary day school
- Motto: Latin: Labor Omnia Vincit (Work Conquers All)
- Established: 1962
- Principal: Karl Schier
- Grades: 7–12
- Enrolment: 160
- Campus: Beaufort
- Colours: Royal blue, yellow, white and lime green
- Website: www.beaufortsc.vic.edu.au

Beaufort Secondary College is a state secondary college located in the town of Beaufort in Victoria, Australia which is located on the Western Highway midway between Ararat and Ballarat, in the Pyrenees Shire local government area.

== About the school ==
Beaufort Secondary College is a Year 7–12 college of 160 students serving a rural community in Western Victoria, approximately 50 km from Ballarat. The school is situated beside Beaufort Lake and is located in a precinct that includes most of the town's sporting and community facilities – the Beaufort Community Bank Complex, town oval, tennis courts, golf course and bowling green.

The college is a member of the Wimmera Virtual Schooling Project, Ballarat VET Cluster and the Ballarat Technical Training Centre consortium, and this has allowed it to further extend the opportunities for its students.

Like most rural schools, Beaufort High School is designated a school which is under-represented in the university undergraduate population, and its students can apply for special eligibility. Additionally, universities such as Flinders University, offer bonus points for university access to students from rural and isolated areas.

In 2006, Beaufort High School was the recipient of a Commonwealth Bank Financial Literacy Grant aim to develop secondary students' money management skills through learning initiatives focusing on areas such as budgeting, superannuation, taxation, marketing, mobile phone contracts, small business management and profit/loss in business.

== History ==
The school was founded in 1960 as Beaufort High School. The school buildings were constructed in the Light Timber Construction (LTC) style which was developed by the Public Works Department to aide in the speedy construction of schools in the 1950s and 1960s. The school was constructed in several stages, and consists of two LTC wings, joined by a link corridor. The school buildings are rendered in pre-cast cement tiles, and aside from minor refurbishment are largely as originally constructed.

In the early 1980s the Science Wing, on the South side, burnt down. Arson was considered the cause, but never proved. The Science Wing was rebuilt and reopened for the start of the 1985 school year.

The school celebrated its 50th anniversary in June 2010.

The Beaufort Primary School, No. 60, and the local Kindergarten has moved to the High/Secondary School Site and it is now a K–12.

The IT Wing was redeveloped and completed in 2018.

In 2019 the Art Wing was redeveloped.
