= Monash Special Developmental School =

Coordinates: 37.9171°S 145.1435°E

Monash Special Developmental School is a Department of Education school in Victoria, Australia located in the Melbourne suburb of Wheelers Hill. It provides for students aged 2.8 to 18 years with significant developmental delay and/or intellectual disabilities including autism spectrum disorder and multiple disabilities.
