= 2023 VCE exam period controversies =

School exam controversies in Australia

The 2023 Victorian Certificate of Education (VCE) exam period began on 2 October with oral language and performance examinations and concluded on 15 November. During the exam period, multiple controversies arose regarding student behaviour on muck-up day and mistakes being made on multiple written examinations.

== Background ==
VCE is undertaken by students in Year 11 and Year 12 generally undertaken over two years, however some students spread this out over three years. VCE students undertake six subjects in Year 11 and five in Year 12. English is compulsory at both year levels.

A written error occurred in the 2023 General Achievement Test, conducted in June, a compulsory exam sat by 50,000 students, which had one word misspelt. Instead of the word "brushing", the paper contained the word "bushing". One student who sat the test explained the way the error in the test — designed to test the reading comprehension and vocabulary of the state's year 12 students for moderating purposes — was communicated at her school. "Halfway through the reading time a lady came into the room and said, 'I'm sorry to interrupt everyone but there's an amendment you'll have to make to your exam'." "Everyone had to pick up a pen and cross out bushing and write brushing. Then we had to put our pens down and go back to reading time." The student summed up the views of many by saying: "A document given to 50,000 year 12s which is written by 100 people should at least be proof-read properly." The Herald Sun reported on 7 September, there had been error-riddled VCE maths exams for 20 years robbing students of scholarships and marks.

== Muck Up Day incidents ==
=== Brighton Secondary College ===
Brighton Secondary College came under scrutiny after students dressed up as Arabs in what was believed to be an anti-Semitic stunt. 3AW first reported a group of students dressed up in Arab attire, which has been described as a "vicious, cruel and hateful" stunt aimed to antagonise Jewish students amid the Gaza war. Chair of the Anti-Defamation Commission, Dr. Dvir Abramovich, condemned the student's actions on Neil Mitchell's program, "I've spoken to leadership at Brighton Secondary College. There was a small number of students who came to muck up day (Note: Final day of attending school before VCE exams; School tradition of pranks among students and teachers.) dressed with Arab attire. They were taken to the principal's office and they were instructed to immediately take off their costumes. As far as I understand, the school is taking it very seriously. There will be disciplinary repercussions, and a statement is now being prepared by the Department of Education. This was mean-spirited, it was vicious, it was cruel and it was hateful."

=== Melbourne Girls' College ===
At Melbourne Girls' College, the final assembly and guard of honour was cancelled after a small group of students damaged the school and prompted a lock-out of other students. A Department of Education spokesperson said: "Melbourne Girls College cancelled a final assembly for its Year 12 students on Monday after some students in the year level breached the school's clearly defined standards of behaviour. The school is investigating the incident and will be following up with students." Principal Tamy Stubley sent a letter to parents and stated that the girls' behaviour "did not uphold our college values". One parent expressed their disappointment with local media that all year 12s, and not only the perpetrators, were locked out of the school, with parents left uninformed of the incident until at least three hours later. "A lot of the girls were in tears. They couldn't get their bags, which were thrown over the fence. We sent them to school thinking they would be safe, but they had been kicked out by staff," she said.

=== Camberwell High School ===
Police were called to Camberwell High School after a group of senior students, cloaked in balaclavas, allegedly forcibly entered the school premises after hours and left a trail of destruction. Students used sardines, bleach, varnish, rotten milk, and vinegar to cause extensive damage. They also uprooted turf on the school's oval. The estimated damage bill was expected to be several thousand dollars. The students returned despite repeated warnings to vacate the premises, and police were called. Several female staff members were also allegedly the subjects of an egg attack. A Department of Education spokesperson issued a statement to the Herald Sun, saying: "Camberwell High School is deeply disappointed with the behaviour of some of its Year 12 students and has taken appropriate disciplinary action. Camberwell High School has clear policies around the expected behaviour of its students and acted immediately to stop the disruptive behaviour and support students and staff affected."

=== Emmaus College ===
Police officers in an unmarked police car pulled over a Toyota Corolla hatchback after they saw a person's leg in the back window of the car. They found seven Emmaus College school-leavers in the five-seater car – one of which was unrestrained in the car's boot and another who was unbuckled in the back seat with three other passengers. The vehicle's 18-year-old female driver had her car impounded for 30 days at a cost of approximately $900. She was also charged on summons with having an overloaded vehicle, carrying a passenger in the boot of a vehicle, and passengers occupying the same seat with no seat belt. Sergeant Paul Egan sharing some details of the incident online on the Facebook group Eyewatch – Manningham Police Service Area "Today is a day that is commonly known as 'muck-up day'. Let me be clear, there is mucking up and there is........ MUCKING UP! – I thought about substituting a letter but thought better of it, Nunawading Highway Patrol members were patrolling today in an unmarked vehicle when they spotted a leg in the back window of a Toyota Corolla that was driving past them. They discussed among themselves and realised that particular model of Toyota didn't come with a full size replacement leg in the boot, just a space saver leg that only went to the knee." Sergeant Egan explained how he and his partner located not just a "spare leg in the boot" but a "whole body attached to it" and a "spare body stored across the back seat with three other passengers". "Now unless you are a clown in a circus, it's very much against the law to have more people in the car than there are seats, if you decide to do it on a public street, you are still a clown but now one that is in a lot of trouble. As I heard a grumpy old traffic cop say to a driver many years ago, 'you sir, are a headline waiting to happen! The female driver will now be going to court to explain her decision to the Magistrate." Principal Karen Jebb said the school was saddened to hear about the incident. "This has been a poor and disappointing decision from a small number of our students, especially after they were explicitly directed to leave cars at home, motor vehicle incidents represent a high-risk for young people starting out as drivers, and I thank Victoria Police for their vigilance."

=== Marcellin College ===
According to one year 12 parent who spoke to the Herald Sun, male students from Marcellin College dressed as Power Rangers were on the school's oval in Bulleen when things "started getting out of hand" but "the vast majority of the students left after a couple lit flares and a few threw eggs, but when they started running away they were chased by teachers in cars across streets and parks and even across main roads, one ran into a tree while being chased and broke his nose, the school then banned all year 12s who were not in roll-call from attending classes for the next two days. "They should not have stopped kids from prepping for exams — it's a different thing from stopping them from attending graduation events. Our perspective is that this is a complete overreaction by the school and whilst things may have gotten out of hand from some students, to punish them all was excessive," the parent said. Principal Marco Di Cesare defended his actions, saying it felt like a "return to muck-up days of the 1980s. This is not the rite of passage we want for our kids." Di Cesare said he was "very clear with parents about what we expected and asked them for their support. We were not going to just ignore it when our students were gathering in parks in suits and with masks on their faces which can be intimidating to the community." He said there was "really bad behaviour going on" and that it was a "gross exaggeration" to suggest kids were being chased by teachers, but said some had fireworks and "so it was a duty of care to ensure the community is safe".

=== Footscray High School ===
At Footscray High School vegemite, lubricant and polystyrene balls was smeared around the college, all 180 students in the cohort were made to clean up the chaos, though only 10 were responsible. Parents argued it was unfair to punish every year 12 member of the school. A mother told Herald Sun "The kids went in for their last day of school on Thursday and ended up on their knees cleaning — it was very disappointing for them, the kids felt bad for the cleaners. There was no lasting damage but there was a huge amount of mess. There was CCTV so they know who did it, so why not punish them and leave everyone else alone?"

=== Other incidents ===
At Oakleigh Grammar, furniture was strewn around the school, bean bag beans were scattered on floors, bathroom mirrors were defaced and hallways blocked. Principal Mark Robertson said the damage was "not harmful or malicious but it was quite messy. Those responsible were sent home and came back the next day for final assembly. Some other students came in early too to help, which says a lot about our students, and it was all cleaned up before other students arrived." At Tintern Grammar, students up-ended furniture and scattered streamers and flyers but it was all cleaned up before other students arrived. A clip of the mayhem has been viewed 500,000 times and received 78,000 likes. A student who posted it said he was "absolutely robbed" due to the clean-up. There were similar scenes at Sirius College where students bragged about "leaving our mark".

== Written exam errors ==
=== General Mathematics ===
Two different errors were discovered in the General Mathematics Exam 2. The first error was an extra "of" in a preamble to part D of question 14. Students were told to cross out the extra "of" to avoid confusion. The second error was another typo in part D of question 9, related to a matrix, which incorrectly included two 1s in a column. The second mistake was discovered after the exam ended.

=== Mathematical Methods ===
Students were told to cross out the letter 'm' after the number 8 and replace it with "metres". The question should have read "metres per second" not "m per second" as it did. A senior maths figure told the Herald Sun the latest correction "shouldn't have been needed — you say either m/s or metres per second. You don't say m per second". Three more issues arose since students sat the exam. The first is the word "maximal" is missing in question 5 part b. The second is that in number 9 of the multiple choice questions, the word "smooth" should be replaced with the word "differentiable". The third is that the word "maximum" is missing from question 4 part f. A teacher called the problem in question 4, a "cheap knock-off of the 2009 maths methods exam [2 Section 2] question 3". One teacher noted that "questions from old past exams are often recycled but are usually modified and disguised much better than this one. The uncanny similarity was obvious at a glance. Very lazy. There will be students who would have seen the 2009 question and may well have included solutions in their bound reference". Bound books could be brought into the exam. The Victorian Curriculum and Assessment Authority (VCAA) has past exams and answers going back to 2006 on their website, so the 2009 exam and solution was freely available to students this year.

=== Specialist Mathematics ===
An error in the Specialist Mathematics Exam 2 Section B, Question 6, part h was picked up by students and teachers during the exam. It involved the mislabeling of a graph, with H1 and H0 switched around. A leading teacher labelled the mistake "very careless and potentially confusing". A spokesperson for the VCAA said it had determined the error on the 80-mark exam meant the question was no longer valid and all students who attempted the question would be awarded a correct score. During a 8 November interview on ABC Radio Melbourne with Rafael Epstein, about this error, as well errors from the 2022 Specialist Mathematics exams, Monash University mathematician Professor Burkard Polster, explained that he had offered to proof read the VCE mathematics exams for free but the VCAA had declined his offer. He also explained why giving every student 1 mark for this question is not actually fair, as some students may have wasted time on the error-full question, resulting in them losing composure for the next questions, while this would not have happened to students who skipped the question altogether.

=== Chemistry ===
There was error on the Chemistry exam regarding a question about the composition of coconut oil, which had listed the formula for linolenic acid rather than linoleic acid, as intended. Regarding the chemistry error, the VCAA said, according to the Herald Sun, it "takes all concerns raised about VCE examination papers seriously and investigates accordingly. Following full consideration of any concerns raised, the VCAA will take any necessary action to ensure students are not disadvantaged and assessments are fair and reliable".

=== Chinese language exams ===
The Chinese Second Language Advanced (SLA) exam was held on 6 November, before the Chinese Second Language (SL) exam, which is a significantly easier subject, and held the following week. However, a group of Chinese language students were given the wrong exam. Six students at two schools were affected. The students affected had been asked to sign a confidentiality agreement to not share details of the exam before 16 November. Despite this, at least one of the essay questions and details of some listening exercises were leaked online and began circulating on Reddit and Chinese social media sites. The Chinese as a Second Language exam was amended after the online leak. However, several students confirmed to the Australian Broadcasting Corporation (ABC) that they experienced problems with an audio component of the exam. A student said "[I was told] spend five minutes to read [the text prompt], and then it'll be followed by an audio, except the audio never showed up." The student said the text prompt associated with the missing audio was among the details that had been revealed on social media. Several students on the social media site Reddit complained about the audio problems. "How long did it take our school to get the audio back?? it took like 40 minutes cause they kept on messing it up but we only got 5 minutes extra," said one. "It's disappointing how VCAA has handled the situation," said another. "Yeah it's literally not fair at all, different schools got different amounts of extra time and vcaa isn't willing to take the blame for this incident," said another. The Chinese as a Second Language exam that ended up being taken by students was largely unchanged despite the paper being handed out early, with participants just asked to cross out the leaked writing prompt, which was one of four options. Ilana Finefter-Rosenbluh, a senior lecturer in Educational Assessment and Ethics at Monash University, told the ABC that the "vast majority" of VCE exams were error-free and "while it is unfortunate, we might expect for some human errors to happen in such large-scale assessment procedures and processes".

== Aftermath ==
The opposition Victorian Liberal Party called for a review into the exam errors. VCAA CEO Stephen Gniel initially supported the idea of an external audit, calling it "a good idea". However, three days later, a VCAA spokesperson confirmed a comprehensive review "of exam writing and vetting processes" will now occur internally alongside the Department of Education. "The VCAA reiterates the apology for undue stress this has caused schools and students and has taken steps to ensure that no student is disadvantaged by these errors," the VCAA spokesperson said. Shadow Minister for education Jess Wilson labeled the VCAA's decision "unacceptable". "Just two days ago, students, school communities and families were led to believe an independent review of these errors would occur – now the government has backflipped in an effort to keep the truth hidden. A review conducted by the same people responsible for these mistakes will not get to the bottom of what went wrong, or fix the system for future years ... (Education Minister Ben Carroll) must ensure a truly independent review is conducted."

Stephen Gniel was subsequently seconded into the position of acting CEO of ACARA, starting 20 November 2023, and will be responsible for the 2024 NAPLAN assessments.

The ABC has reported that "An investigation into several exam bungles has uncovered a cultural problem at Victoria's Curriculum and Assessment Authority (VCAA), with change required before this year's exams are designed. ..." The report into the VCAA's VCE examination setting policies, processes and procedures (commissioned by the Education Minister Ben Carroll) by the former head of the NSW Education Standards Authority, Dr John Bennett, was handed to the Victorian government in March 2024 and made public on 22 March 2024. It found that there were significant and serious errors in the 2022 and 2023 mathematics exams. This contradicted previous claims by the VCAA and an earlier review (commissioned by the VCAA) by Deloitte that there were no serious errors in the 2022 exams. The Department of Education has refused to release the review by Deloitte, which is currently the subject of several Freedom of Information requests and appeals of a decision to refuse access.

The Bennett Report makes 6 high-level recommendations, each with associated actions. One of the recommendations was that the VCAA work with mathematics and science academics when drafting and proofreading exams, to improve quality control before the tests end up on students' desks. Education Minister Ben Carroll has stated that all the recommendations of the Bennett Report will be accepted.

As a result of the Bennett Report, the VCAA published amended copies of the 2022 Specialist Mathematics exams and Examination Reports. Four questions containing serious mathematical errors (that the VCAA had previously denied existed on multiple occasions) were redacted. An amended copy of the 2022 Mathematical Methods Exam 2 and Examination Report was also published, with the redaction of a question containing a serious mathematical error.

The VCAA has made no official comment on the 'human cost' of the 2022 exam errors and whether teachers and academics who were ignored when they repeatedly alerted the VCAA of these errors should now receive an apology. The VCAA has not said what it has done to identify and compensate students who may have been disadvantaged (for example, by missing out on scholarships, Premier's Awards, or a higher University offer) by the 2022 exam errors and the incorrect grading of these exams as a result of the errors.
