= Billanook College =

Location
- 97–199 Cardigan Road; Mooroolbark, Victoria; Australia; 37.789243°S 145.340431°E

Information
- Type: private, co-educational secondary school
- Motto: Growing and Caring
- Denomination: in association with the Uniting Church
- Established: 1980
- Principal: Roger Oates
- Staff: 129 FTE
- Years: ELC–12
- Gender: Co-educational
- Enrolment: 775 (2018)
- Colours: Red and Blue
- Mascot: The Billanook Tree
- Affiliation: Eastern Independent Schools of Melbourne
- CRICOS no.: 00131M
- Website: www.billanook.vic.edu.au

Billanook College is a private co-ed school with an early learning program through to Year 12, located in Mooroolbark, Melbourne, Victoria, Australia. It operates in association with the Uniting Church in Australia (but is not governed or managed by the Church) and is a member of Round Square. It was founded in 1980 by the founding principal Peter Harris. The college's current principal is Roger Oates.

Billanook College is named after the name the local Wurundjeri people called the area, on which the college now stands.

Billanook College is a member of the Eastern Independent Schools of Melbourne. EISM member schools in the same area regularly play each other in sporting activities ranging from Cricket, Tennis, Basketball, Soccer, Field Hockey and Australian Rules Football to Badminton and Table Tennis. Billanook College hosts the local VET Media and Music course as it has since 2004.

== Facilities ==
The college has recently begun an ambitious building program and since 2009 have constructed several new buildings, including The Alan Ross Centre (The ARC), a 475-seat auditorium named after the college's long-serving former principal, Alan Ross, who served from 1997 to 2009. The new Junior Early Learning Centre was opened in 2010 and four new fully equipped science laboratories were also opened in mid 2010.

On 28 January 2016, Billanook College opened its $1.8 million Discovery Centre building.

About a year later Billanook opened the Mastery Centre for students from Year 7 to 9.

They're now looking into refurbishing Senior School, and then the Performing Arts Section of the college.

== Grounds ==
Billanook College has expansive grounds including two full sized ovals, one half size oval, a large gym, three basketball courts and a volleyball court.

In conjunction with Yarra Valley winemakers Billanook College has developed its own working vineyard and Viticulture Skills Centre on the school property, which first produced 68 bottles of their first vintage in 2004.

== Sport ==
Billanook is a member of the Eastern Independent Schools of Melbourne (EISM).

=== EISM Premierships ===
Billanook has won the following EISM senior premierships.

Combined:

- Swimming (2) – 1998, 2000

Boys:

- Badminton – 2013
- Basketball (4) – 1998, 2002, 2003, 2006
- Football (3) – 1998, 1999, 2003
- Handball – 2004
- Hockey – 2019
- Indoor Soccer – 2005
- Swimming (3) – 1999, 2000, 2001
- Table Tennis – 2000
- Tennis – 2005
- Volleyball (16) – 2000, 2001, 2002, 2003, 2004, 2005, 2008, 2009, 2010, 2011, 2012, 2013, 2014, 2015, 2017, 2018

Girls:

- Basketball (4) – 2001, 2002, 2003, 2005
- Cricket (2) – 2000, 2006
- Cross Country – 1999
- Football (5) – 2004, 2005, 2013, 2015, 2016
- Hockey (3) – 1998, 1999, 2000
- Indoor Cricket (6) – 2007, 2010, 2011, 2012, 2013, 2021
- Soccer (2) – 1998, 2009
- Softball (6) – 2005, 2006, 2007, 2008, 2013, 2019
- Volleyball (10) – 2006, 2008, 2009, 2010, 2011, 2012, 2013, 2018, 2019, 2020

== Notable alumni ==
- Simon Clarke – Professional road bicycle racer
- Tony D'Alberto – Professional race car driver
- Julian de Stoop – AFL journalist
- Prof. Alister Graham – Astrophysicist
- Daniel Hargraves – Former AFL player
- Trent Lowe – Professional road bicycle racer
- Daniel Merriweather – R&B artist
- Damian Monkhorst – AFL player
- Stephanie Payne – Writer, blogger, public servant, charity fundraiser and activist
- Paul Sanderson – Australian volleyball player

== See also ==
- List of schools in Victoria
- List of high schools in Victoria
- Victorian Certificate of Education
