= The Knox School =

The Knox School may refer to:

- The Knox School (Australia), Melbourne, Victoria
- The Knox School (United States), Saint James, New York, USA
