= Directorate of Army Research and Analysis =

- Abbreviation: DARA
- Location: Canberra, Australian Capital Territory
- Coordinates: 35.2980°S 149.1506°E
- Parent organization: Australian Army

The Directorate of Army Research and Analysis (DARA) is a branch of the Australian Army Headquarters and serves as the Army’s think tank. DARA is part of the Army's Modernisation and Strategic Plans division, and is located in Russell Offices, Canberra. DARA provides research and analysis to the Australian Army and Government to support the Army’s modernisation and strategic planning. DARA also promotes professional debate on topics such as the changing character of land warfare and Australia’s strategic environment.

== Overview ==
The primary focus of DARA is conceptual research into land warfare issues, including land warfare strategy and operations, maritime strategy, the changing character of war, the human dimension of warfare, military sociology and Australian military strategy. DARA retains close links with like organisations in the other services of the Australian Defence Force, notably the Seapower Centre and the Airpower Development Centre.

DARA houses the Deputy Director Strategy - Army (STRAT-A) who works in areas of strategic planning and doctrine. Responsibilities of STRAT-A includes conducting analysis of the nature of future land warfare, articulating the capability development Army requires in order to achieve success into the future and monitoring Australia’s strategic environment. STRAT-A works to identify emerging strategic level drivers and engages with Australian and international strategic community members to contribute to public debate and policy development.

DARA works closely with the Land Warfare Studies Centre (LWSC), which supports the Chief of Army (Australia), Army Headquarters and the Army as a whole through a range of research, publication and conference programs. LWSC engages with research commentators, academic institutions and military agencies in order to explore the changing character of war, both in its historical context and how such changes will affect the Army of the future. LWSC also works to build upon conceptual dialogue of land warfare concepts within joint and combined contexts. DARA also makes contributions to public debate on defence and strategic policy issues.

LWSC sponsors regular seminars which seek to explore the various issues surrounding the contemporary strategic, political and military environment. These seminars include presentations by recognised experts in fields such as strategy development and the Indo-Pacific region.

In 2012, DARA coordinated the Chief of Army's Exercise, held in Melbourne and involving the Chiefs of Army, or their representatives, from 15 countries. The theme of this activity was "The Australian Army's role in a Maritime Strategy", and exercise participants explored topics relevant to land forces throughout the region.

== History ==
DARA has previously existed in many different forms and can trace roots back to the controversial World War II Directorate of Research and Civil Affairs or DORCA. From 1975 to 1997, DARA was known as the Directorate of Army Research, or DAR. In 1997, under then Lieutenant Colonel Neil James, DAR split into two separate organisations. The first of these was named DARA and was responsible for development of Army futures planning. The second, the Land Warfare Studies Centre (LWSC), was designed to be an independent think tank, in a similar fashion to the Royal Australian Air Force’s Air Power Development Centre and the Royal Australian Navy’s Sea Power Centre. In order to facilitate this, LWSC was excised from Army Headquarters as an independent unit, and moved premises to the Royal Military College, Duntroon where it remains to this day. LWSC achieves diversity of thought by drawing staff from many separate areas, including serving army officers, academics and Defence Science and Technology Organisation (DSTO) scientists. Academics who have worked for LWSC include Dr Michael Evans, Professor Alan Dupont and Professor David Horner.

== Notable alumni ==
Other notable alumni include:

- David Kilcullen
- Dr Michael Evans, Fellow, Australian Defence College
- Justin Kelly (Director General Future Land Warfare)
- Peter Leahy
- Peter Warwick (Gus) Gilmore (Director General Future Land Warfare)
- Mr Andrew Balmaks, co-founder and chairman of Noetic Solutions

== Publications ==
Key publications produced by LWSC are:

- doctrine:
  - Land Warfare Doctrine 1 – The Fundamentals of Land Power (LWD-1; 2017)
  - Future Land Warfare Report (FLWR; 2014)
  - Adaptive Campaigning – Future Land Operating Concept (AC-FLOC; 2009)
- journals:
  - The Australian Army Journal (2003–present);
  - Senior Officer's Professional Digest (2002–present); which summarizes articles from global professional military journals.
- LWSC Working Papers; and
  - Revising Counterinsurgency: A Manoeuverist Approach Response to the ‘War on Terror’ for the Australian Army (2006)
- LWSC Study Papers
  - Forward from the Past: The Development of Australian Army Doctrine 1972–Present (No. 301, 1999).
