= Alphington Grammar School =

Location
- Alphington, Victoria; Australia; 37°46′49.3″S 145°02′10″E

Information
- Type: private school, co-educational
- Motto: Aspiring to Excellence
- Denomination: Non-denominational
- Established: 1989
- Chairman: Prof. Marinis Pirpiris
- Principal: Dr Vivianne Nikou
- Years: ELC–12
- Gender: Co-educational
- Enrolment: ~850
- Houses: Aristotle , Byron , Pericles and Socrates
- Colours: Blue, white and black
- Affiliation: Eastern Independent Schools of Melbourne
- Website: www.alphington.vic.edu.au

Alphington Grammar School is a private, co-educational secondary school located in Alphington, Victoria, Australia, established by the Greek Orthodox Community of Melbourne in 1988.

The school was designed to reflect the cultural diversity of Melbourne, and is non-denominational with students from around 25 ethnic and religious backgrounds.

== History ==
Alphington Grammar School was established by the Greek Orthodox Community of Melbourne in 1989, the campus having previously been Parade College.. The founding Principal was Mr. Ashley Vance Latchford, Dip. Tchng., B.Ed., B.A., M.Ed.

The Greek community of Melbourne is supportive of the school and holds its Greek language classes on campus on Friday evenings as well as weekends.

In 2022 Alphington Grammar came into conflict with the City of Yarra over the illegal erection of gates across Old Heidelberg Road which the school had used to block community access to public land on Darebin Creek. During community consultation the City of Yarra council received more than 300 submissions for opening the road, and only 14 against. Alphington Grammar was initially ordered to remove the gates preventing public access to public land by 16 May, but refused to do so. An extended deadline of 24 May was offered, and upon its expiry council workers removed the gate. In response to the removal of the gate, Alphington Grammar quickly erected a temporary replacement gate. This gate was removed on the same day by a member of the public with an angle grinder in broad daylight.

In the 2023 school year Alphington Grammar reopened its 'International Gateways' program offering overseas travel opportunities to students in years 9 and 10. The program was introduced in 2014 but placed on hold with the beginning of the COVID-19 pandemic.

In 2023 Alphington Grammar was accused of stigmatising mental healthcare when the school came under criticism for its response to a proposal to open an outpatient mental healthcare facility at a nearby former aged care home. Alphington Grammar argued that the facility would expose its students to drug-affected or predatory patients. However, despite the stated concerns of the school, the proposed facility would only cater to patients with mild disorders such as depression, anxiety, and post-traumatic stress disorder. The facility would exclude those with a primary diagnosis of substance abuse, and not provide high-acuity psychiatric services, forensic or criminal mental health services, or a mental health emergency service.

== Sport ==
Alphington Grammar is a member of the Eastern Independent Schools of Melbourne (EISM).

=== EISM Premierships ===
Alphington Grammar has won the following EISM senior premierships.

Combined:

- Cross Country – 2013

Boys:

- Basketball – 2014
- Cross Country – 2013
- Football (2) – 2002, 2003
- Football 12's – 2017
- Hockey – 2005
- Soccer (6) – 2001, 2002, 2003, 2011, 2012, 2018
- Soccer five-a-side (3) – 2015, 2017, 2018
- Table Tennis (3) – 2015, 2016, 2017
- Tennis (5) – 2005, 2006, 2017, 2018, 2020
- Volleyball (4) – 2014, 2018, 2019, 2020

Girls:

- Netball (2) – 2016, 2019
- Soccer (3) – 2013, 2017, 2018
- Soccer five-a-side – 2015
- Softball – 2004
- Tennis – 2009
- Volleyball (2) – 2014, 2020
