= Elizabeth Eggleston =

Australian activist

Elizabeth Moulton Eggleston (6 November 1934 – 24 March 1976) was an Australian activist, author, lawyer and champion for Indigenous Australians. One obituary described Eggleston as "gentle and unassuming" woman.

Eggleston was born in Armadale, Melbourne to Sir Richard Moulton Eggleston, a barrister and later judge who became chancellor of Monash University and Isabel Marjorie, a mathematics teacher.

Eggleston died in East Melbourne in 1976. Her memorial service was attended by members of the Indigenous community. She is buried in Brighton Cemetery.

== Education ==
Eggleston attended the Presbyterian Ladies' College and Tintern Church of England Girls' Grammar School.

In 1956, Eggleston graduated with an LL.B degree from the University of Melbourne with second-class honors (division B). In 1958 she graduated with an LL.M. degree from the University of California at Berkeley, and in 1964 she finished an arts degree at the University of Melbourne. In 1964 she became the first doctoral candidate in the faculty of law at Monash University, from which she obtained her Ph.D. in 1970; she wrote her thesis on Aborigines and the administration of justice.

During her studies, Eggleston was an active member of the Australian Student Christian Movement, Students' Representative Council, legal-aid volunteer and worked for the legal journal, Res Judicatae.

== Contributions to the Australian Indigenous community ==
In 1969, Eggleston became a lecturer in the faculty of law at Monash University, and after two years she was promoted to senior lecturer. After 1971 she also served as part-time director of Monash's Centre for Research into Aboriginal Affairs. During her time as director, she established a course titled, Black Australian Studies and provided resources to Aboriginal groups.

In 1972, she became a founder of the Victorian Aboriginal Legal Service. In founding the Victorian Aboriginal Legal Service, Eggleston conducted discussions with Aborigines in Pentridge prison and advised Aboriginal communities. She also pursued discrimination and made submissions to government inquiries. Eggleston was actively involved in trying to address Aboriginal land rights and cultural heritage.

In 1972–1973, she had study leave in North America where she did research into Indian communities. Her visit to the Navajo Indian country inspired her to write her thesis on Aboriginals and the administration of justice. This led to her conducting research in Victoria, Western Australia and South Australia.

== The Elizabeth Eggleston Memorial collection ==
The Elizabeth Eggleston Memorial Collection is located in the Koorie Research Unit of the Monash Indigenous Studies Centre. The collection was named after Eggleston due to her role as a former director of the then Centre for Research into Aboriginal Studies due to her significant contributions to research on Aboriginal Australians and the law.

Eggleston donated her collection of books, papers and various materials to the centre. The collection currently holds over 5000 materials relating to Aboriginal affairs. The library is currently accessible at the Monash Clayton campus, Menzies Building 11.

== Published work ==
In 1973, she co-authored Cases and Materials on Industrial Law in Australia.

Two months before she died, her book Fear, Favour or Affection was published, in 1976; it was based on her doctoral thesis. Reviewers noted that the book addressed systemic discrimination against Aboriginal Australians within the criminal justice system.
