= Nancy Millis =

Australian microbiologist (1922–2012)

Nancy Fannie Millis AC MBE FAA FTSE (10 April 1922 – 29 September 2012) was an Australian microbiologist and Emeritus Professor who introduced fermentation technologies to Australia, and created the first applied microbiology course taught in an Australian university.

== Biography ==
Millis was born in Melbourne in 1922, the fifth child of six. She attended high school at Merton Hall, Melbourne Girls Grammar, but had to leave before completing her studies when her father had a heart attack. She attended business college, then worked for a customs agent and then as a technician at the CSIRO. Millis matriculated part-time, taking two years to complete her high school studies. The University of Melbourne refused her entry into the Bachelor of Science; however, she could gain entry to the degree of agricultural science. In 1945 she graduated with a BAgSc, and went on to complete a master's degree in 1946 studying the soil organism Pseudomonas.

Millis travelled to Papua New Guinea with the Department of External Affairs to teach women agricultural methods. However, her posting was cut short due to serious illness that almost claimed her life and she was airlifted to hospital in Brisbane. After recovering from her illness she applied for a Boots Research Scholarship at the University of Bristol. She spent three years at Bristol working on the fermentation of cider, and microorganisms that can affect the process. This led Nancy in her lifelong passion in anything that ferments.

When she completed her PhD in 1951, Millis returned to Australia; she had hoped to work for Carlton United Brewery, but at that time they did not employ women in their laboratories. She joined the Department of Microbiology at the University of Melbourne in 1952 and worked as a demonstrator, and then as a lecturer, setting up the Applied Microbiology course at the university. In 1954 Millis was awarded a Fulbright Travel Grant; she went to Hopkins Marine Station at Stanford University and worked with C B Van Neil, and then to the Institute of Applied Microbiology at the University of Tokyo.

Millis was the Chancellor of La Trobe University from 1992 until her retirement in 2006.

She died on 29 September 2012, aged 90.

== Honours and legacy ==
Millis was appointed a Member of the Order of the British Empire (MBE) in the 1977 New Year's Honours. She was awarded Australia's highest civilian honour, Companion of the Order of Australia (AC), in the Queen's Birthday Honours 1990. She was awarded the Centenary Medal on 1 January 2001 and inducted onto the Victorian Honour Roll of Women in 2003.

She was one of six scientists featured in the 2002 Australian Legends series of postage stamps.

She was elected a Fellow of the Australian Academy of Science (FAA), a Fellow of the Australian Academy of Technological Sciences and Engineering (FTSE), and a Fellow of the Royal Society of Victoria (FRSV) in 1999.

The Nancy Millis Room at the Royal Society of Victoria is dedicated to her distinguished contribution to science in the State of Victoria at the Society. In 2014 the Australian Academy of Science inaugurated the Nancy Millis Medal for Women in Science in her honour.

== Bibliography ==
- McCarthy, G.J. (18 October 2012). "Millis, Nancy Fannie (1922-2012)". Biographical entry. Encyclopaedia of Australian Science.
- Morrison, S. (2001). "Interview with Professor Nancy Millis", Australian Academy of Science

Academic offices
Preceded by Richard McGarvie	Chancellor of La Trobe University; 1992 – 2006	Succeeded by Sylvia Walton
