= Nunawading Christian College =

School in Victoria, Australia

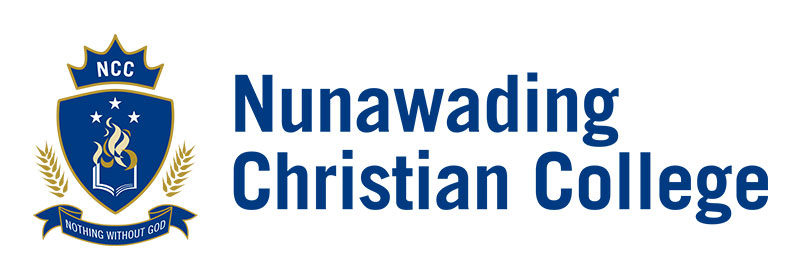

Location
- 161 Central Road and Laughlin Avenue, Nunawading, Melbourne, Victoria; Australia; 37°49′29″S 145°10′4″E

Information
- Type: Independent co-educational early learning, primary and secondary day school
- Motto: Nothing without God
- Religious affiliation: Australian Union Conference of Seventh-day Adventists
- Denomination: Seventh-day Adventist
- Established: 1962; 64 years ago
- Chairman: Scott Rankin
- Principal: Meggan James
- Years offered: ELC–12
- Gender: Co-educational
- Enrolment: 433
- Colours: Blue and yellow
- Slogan: Learning for Living, Character for Life
- Affiliation: Eastern Independent Schools of Melbourne
- Website: nunawading.vic.edu.au

Nunawading Christian College is an independent Seventh-day Adventist co-educational early learning, primary and secondary day school, located in the Melbourne suburb of Nunawading, Victoria, Australia.

The College is part of the Seventh-day Adventist Church's worldwide educational system.

== Overview ==
Established in 1962 as a primary school, Nunawading Christian College (NCC) consists of an early learning centre, primary school and secondary school. The College was established by the Seventh-day Adventist Church. All Seventh-day Adventist Schools in the State of Victoria form a single system with each school tied constitutionally to Seventh-day Adventist Schools (Victoria) Inc. This central organisation controls the employment of teaching staff and, through a committee, determines the distribution of financial resources between schools.

== Spiritual aspects ==
All students take religion classes each year that they are enrolled. These classes cover topics in biblical history and Christian and denominational doctrines. Instructors in other disciplines also begin each class period with prayer or a short devotional thought, many which encourage student input. Weekly, the entire student body gathers together for an hour-long chapel service. Outside the classrooms there is year-round spiritually oriented programming that relies on student involvement.

== Extracurricular activities ==
=== Sport ===
The school is member of the Eastern Independent Schools of Melbourne (EISM). NCC students participate in a variety of team and individual sports against students from other EISM member schools.

==== EISM premierships ====
NCC has won the following EISM senior premierships.

Boys:

- Touch Rugby (4) – 2013, 2016, 2017, 2025
- Volleyball (2) – 2002, 2020

Girls:

- Basketball – 2018
- Soccer (2) – 2001, 2002
- Volleyball (7) – 2002, 2003, 2006, 2007, 2008, 2019, 2020

== See also ==
- Seventh-day Adventist education
- List of non-government schools in Victoria
- List of Seventh-day Adventist secondary schools
