= Alan Dupont =

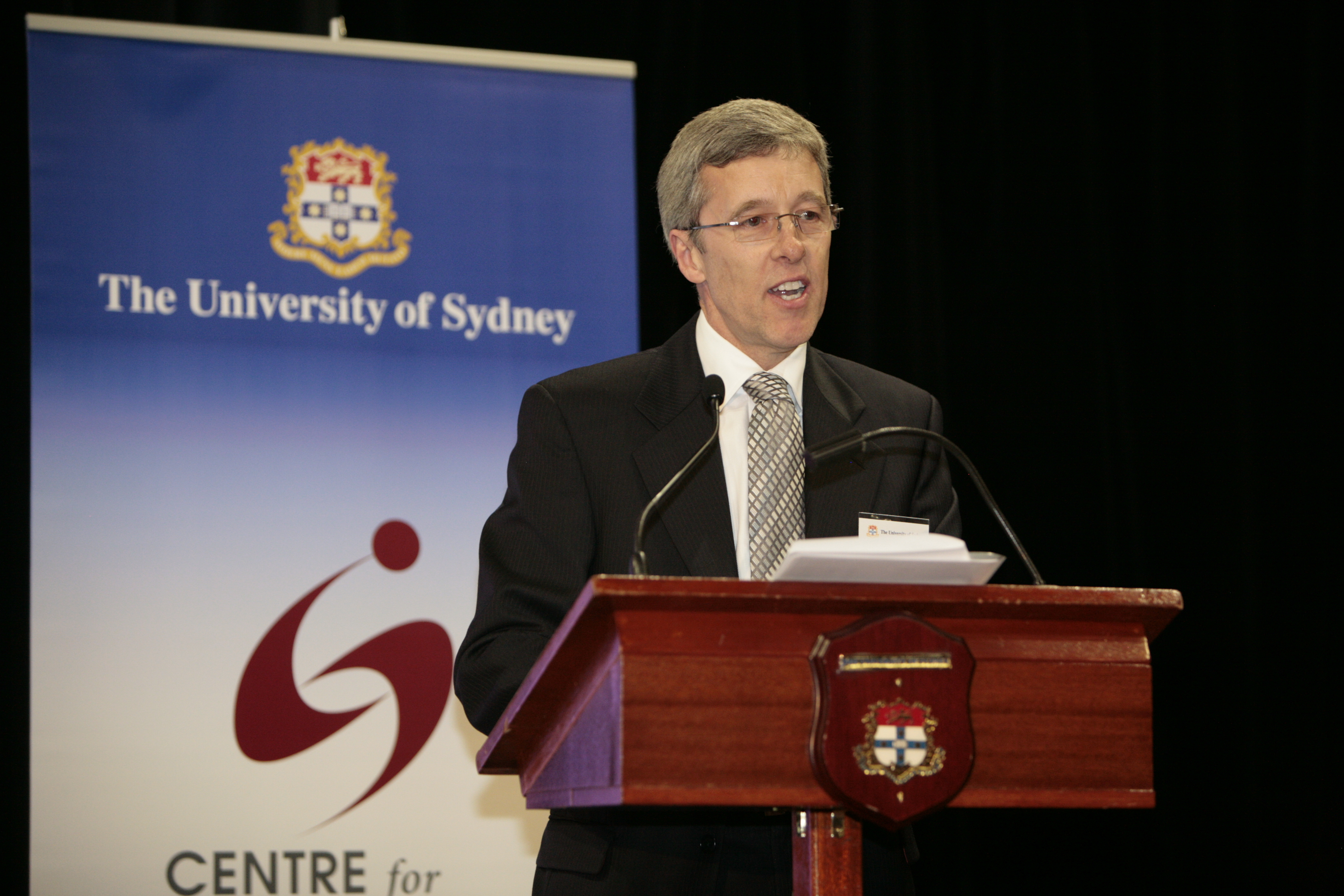
Dr Alan Dupont

Alan Anthony Dupont AO is an Australian international security expert, Defence and National Security Advocate for the Northern Territory and company director who has been the CEO of geopolitical risk consultancy the Cognoscenti Group since 2016. He is also contributing national security editor for The Australian newspaper, adjunct professor at the University of New South Wales (UNSW), a non-resident senior fellow at the Atlantic Council in Washington, and the Lowy Institute in Sydney and a fellow at the Hinrich Foundation.

Dupont is a former army officer, intelligence analyst, freelance journalist, diplomat, academic and well-known commentator on defence and national security issues.

== Education and early career ==
Dupont was born in London, England, and emigrated to Australia in 1957. He attended Aquinas College in Melbourne and the Royal Military College, Duntroon, graduating in 1971. He earned a Bachelor of Arts from the University of NSW and a Master of Arts Degree (Hons) and PhD in International Relations from the Australian National University.

He served with the Fourth Battalion, Royal Australian Regiment, later working as a strategic analyst at the Joint Intelligence Organisation (Australia) in Canberra and, after resigning from the Army, as a free-lance journalist in South America. In 1980, he joined the Department of Foreign Affairs and Trade (Australia) and served in the Australian Embassies in the Republic of Korea South Korea (1984–1987) and Indonesia (1991–1994), the latter as Counsellor. During his time in Korea he studied at the US Foreign Service Institute, graduating in 1985.

== Academic career ==
In 1995, Dupont took up an academic position at the Australian National University as Fellow, and later Senior Fellow, in the Strategic and Defence Studies Centre, Research School of Pacific and Asian Studies. In those capacities, he published widely and became a regular media commentator on Australian defence, foreign policy and East Asian security issues. He became a leading authority in the emerging field of transnational security studies, publishing a pathbreaking book by Cambridge University Press in 2001: "East Asia Imperilled: Transnational Security Challenges."

From 2003 to 2006, he was Senior Fellow and Director of the International Security Program at the Lowy Institute for International Policy in Sydney where he gained international prominence for his work on traditional and new security challenges to the security of the Asia-Pacific region, particularly the strategic implications of climate change, food, water and energy insecurity, pandemics and unregulated population movements. He was an Industry Linkage Fellow with the Australian Research Council from 2004 to 2006.

In 2006, Dupont was appointed as the inaugural Michael Hintze Chair of International Security at the University of Sydney and the first Director of the Centre for International Security Studies. He was later appointed the start-up CEO of the United States Studies Centre, a A$50 million teaching and research collaboration between the University of Sydney, the American Australian Association and the Commonwealth and NSW governments. From 2012 to 2016, Dupont held joint professorial appointments in the Faculty of Arts and Social Sciences and the Business School at the University of New South Wales, before leaving the university to establish the Cognoscenti Group.

== Business and advisory career ==
Dupont has held several company directorships from 1995 to the present, including Director of the United States Studies Centre and Dupont Consulting.

He was an Australian representative on the ASEAN Regional Forum (ARF) Register of Experts and Eminent Persons (2002–2016), and served as a Counsellor of the Australian Strategic Policy Institute (2003–2009), and on the boards of the Land Warfare Centre (Australia) (2005–2010); CQS, a leading European asset manager (2006–2014); the Sydney Globalist (2007–2012); University of Sydney Board of Examiners (2008-09); the Australian Army Journal (2010–2012); Outcomes Australia (2011–2012); and the Northern Territory Strategic Defence Advisory Board (2015–2020).

He was special foreign policy advisor to Nobel Laureate and former President of East Timor, José Ramos-Horta (2001–2006), and has advised several Australian defence and foreign ministers including the former Minister for Defence (Australia), David Johnston (Politician), as ministerial advisor (2013–2014). He led the Abbott Government's Defence White Paper team (2013–2014) and was a member of the Foreign Affairs Council (2003–2007) and the Defence and National Security Advisory Council (2006–2007).

== Honours and appointments ==
Dupont received a commendation from East Timor's Foreign Minister, José Ramos-Horta, in 2001 and a commendation for his analysis and advisory work from Japan's Foreign Minister, Tarō Asō, in 2005.

Dupont was appointed an Officer of the Order of Australia (AO) in the 2019 Queen's Birthday Honours for "distinguished service to the international community through security analysis and strategic policy development".

On 9 November 2020 Dupont was appointed as an Advisory Councillor to the Asia Society Australia. The Society's main aim is to prepare Australian leaders and community for a deeper and sustained engagement with Asia.

On 16 November 2020 Dupont was appointed the new Northern Territory Defence and National Security Advocate. His main role will be to advocate for the Territory and make sure Northern Territory businesses are well positioned to capitalise on the A$270 billion defence equipment and capabilities spend over the next ten years.

== Publications ==
- — (30 June 2020). "An Analysis of China's Proposal to Control and Centrally Manage the Internet". Journal of Telecommunications and the Digital Economy. 8 (2): 159–166. doi:10.18080/jtde.v8n2.298. ISSN 2203-1693.
- —. New Cold War between the US and China (Report). Hinrich Foundation.
- —; Baker, Christopher G. (May–June 2012). "An Asian Security Standoff". The National Interest (119). Center for the National Interest: 55–61. ISSN 0884-9382. JSTOR 42896454.
- "China sets out a snare for the worldwide web", The Weekend Australian, 16 May 2020
- "Defence needs smaller, cheaper, more agile weapons", The Australian, 12 November 2019
- "On Brink of Cold War 2.0", The Weekend Australian, 8 June 2019
- "The global race for space", The Weekend Australian, 15 September 2018
- "Voters have had it with uncontrolled migration", The Australian, 27 June 2018
- "The Autocrats Club", The Weekend Australian, 10 February 2018
- "Islamist eruption highlights regional risks", The Weekend Australian, 17 June 2017
- "Korea's Kim Baits Trump With Missiles", The Weekend Australian, 18 February 2017
- — (1 March 2015). Full spectrum defence: rethinking the fundamentals of Australian defence strategy (Report). Lowy Institute. JSTOR resrep10131.
- "Bumpy ride: Donald Trump to usher in a new world order". The Australian. 2016.
- —; Baker, Christopher G. (12 March 2014). "East Asia's Maritime Disputes: Fishing in Troubled Waters". The Washington Quarterly. 37 (1): 79–98. doi:10.1080/0163660X.2014.893174. eISSN 1530-9177. ISSN 0163-660X. LCCN 00215547. OCLC 747182305.
- "Pax Americana to give way to a new world order", The Australian, 2014
- — (16 October 2013). "The Inevitable Resurgence of Obama's Pivot". The Wall Street Journal. eISSN 1042-9840. ISSN 0099-9660. OCLC 781541372. Archived from the original on 19 July 2022.
- "Time to attack cyber crime with a strong security policy", The Sydney Morning Herald, 13 October 2010
- "Oiling the wheels of energy management", Australian Financial Review, 16 December 2009
- — (14 April 2009). "Our Forces Must First Be Functional". The Australian.
- —; Thirwell, Mark (9 March 2009). "Are We Entering a New Era of Food Insecurity?". Survival. 51 (3): 71–98. doi:10.1080/00396330903011511. eISSN 1468-2699. ISSN 0039-6338. LCCN 64005423. OCLC 642473660.
- — (7 September 2008). "The strategic implications of climate change". Survival. 50 (3): 29–54. doi:10.1080/00396330802173107. eISSN 1468-2699. ISSN 0039-6338. LCCN 64005423. OCLC 642473660.
- "Not the time to deal out Beijing", The Australian, 26 March 2007
- "Unsheathing the Samurai Sword: Japan's Changing Security Policy", Lowy Institute Paper 003, November 2004, pp.1-85
- Alan Dupont, "Transnational Security" in Strategy and Security in the Asia Pacific, ed. R. Ayson and D. Ball, (Crows Nest: Allen and Unwin, 2006), pp. 103–20
- Alan Dupont and Graeme Pearman, Heating up the Planet: Climate Change and Security (Lowy Institute Paper 12, 2006)
- Asia enters a new security era", International Herald Tribune, 5 June 2003
- — (2 May 2008) [1998]. "The Environment and Security in Pacific Asia". The Adelphi Papers. 38 (319). doi:10.1080/05679329808449508. ISBN 978-0199223671. LCCN 99599878. OCLC 489629960. OL 33377262M.
- Alan Dupont, East Asia Imperilled: Transnational Challenges to Security (Cambridge: Cambridge University Press, 2001)
- "There's a catch to world security", The Bangkok Post, 30 June 1999
- "Shielded by Intelligence", The Age, 24 April 1999
- "After Suharto, Who? The Answer Is Far From Obvious", International Herald Tribune, 19 February 1998
- "Wars Over Water?", The Straits Times, 28 May,1997
