= Aquinas College, Melbourne =

Roman Catholic secondary school in Melbourne, Australia

Aquinas College

Location
- 46 Great Ryrie Street; Ringwood, Victoria 3134; Australia; 37°49′23″S 145°14′08″E

Information
- Type: Independent, co-educational
- Motto: Latin: Illuminare et Ardere ("To light up and be on fire")
- Denomination: Roman Catholic
- Established: 1961
- Founder: Parish priests
- Principal: David Broadbent
- Staff: 220+
- Years: 7–12
- Gender: Co-educational
- Enrolment: 1700+
- Colours: Red (Rice); Orange (McCormack); Gold (MacKillop); Green (Dominic); Blue (Chisholm); Purple (Mannix)
- Accreditation: Council of International Schools (CIS)
- Newspaper: The Lighthouse
- Affiliation: Eastern Independent Schools of Melbourne, CIASA, CRICOS, CIS
- Website: aquinas.vic.edu.au

Aquinas College is an Australian co-educational Roman Catholic secondary school in the Melbourne suburb of Ringwood. It is a regional college of the Archdiocese of Melbourne, founded in 1961 to provide secondary education to Catholics residing in the Maroondah Deanery.

== Grounds, buildings and facilities ==
The college is situated approximately 25 kilometres from the center of Melbourne and sits on 30 acres of land in its own green belt with native vegetation and sports areas surrounding it on three sides. The campus of Aquinas College consists of seven building blocks. These are the Senior Years Building, the Year 9 building (the original school building), the Dominic Arts & Media Centre (including the Aquinas Resource Centre), the Staff and Technology Centre, the Gymnasium and Mahon Theatre, the Middle Years Learning Centre and the MacKillop Chapel.

The Senior Years Building contains the Year 12 Wing, social space and study facilities, as well as science labs, classrooms and computer facilities. The second floor is devoted to the Wurundjeri Trade Training Centre (WTTC), a purpose build kitchen and hospitality training centre use for VCE and VET subjects, as well as the Year 9 Cafe N9ne program.

The Middle Years Learning Centre was opened in 2014. The building serves Year 7 and 8 students and includes 18 classrooms, a 150-seat lecture theatre, a multipurpose heated staircase capable for team assemblies and several outdoor learning areas (including two upstairs balconies).

The Technology Centre, houses a fully operational Design & Technology workshop on the ground level and a Systems Technology & Hydraulics room on the second level. In addition, the school's grounds include tennis courts, three ovals for cricket and various codes of football and basketball courts for sporting purposes.

== Sport ==
Aquinas is a member of the Eastern Independent Schools of Melbourne (EISM).

Aquinas has won the following EISM senior premierships.

EISM Senior Premierships

Boys:

- Athletics – 2017
- Basketball (8) – 2010, 2015, 2016, 2017, 2018, 2019, 2020, 2021
- Cricket (4) – 2011, 2017, 2020, 2021
- Cross Country – 2022
- Football (7) – 2010, 2014, 2016, 2017, 2018, 2019, 2022
- Hockey – 2020
- Netball – 2022
- Soccer – 2016
- Softball (3) – 2006, 2019, 2020
- Swimming – 2015
- Table Tennis – 2018
- Tennis (4) – 2010, 2011, 2013, 2018
- Touch Rugby – 2022
- Volleyball (2) – 2019, 2022

Girls:

- Basketball (10) – 2010, 2011, 2012, 2013, 2014, 2015, 2017, 2019, 2020, 2021
- Football – 2014
- Netball (9) – 2011, 2012, 2013, 2014, 2015, 2016, 2018, 2019, 2022
- Soccer (2) – 2019, 2021
- Softball (2) – 2012, 2016
- Tennis (3) – 2014, 2016, 2020
- Ultimate Frisbee (4) – 2015, 2016, 2019, 2020
- Volleyball (2) – 2014, 2020

== Notable alumni ==
- Havana Brown — DJ
- Alan Dupont — Chair of International Security and Director of the Centre for International Security Studies at the University of Sydney
- Daniel Kickert — basketballer
- David Lane — musician
- Liam Shiels — Australian rules footballer with the North Melbourne Football Club
- Michael Sukkar — politician

== See also ==
- List of schools in Victoria
- List of high schools in Victoria
