= Oxley Christian College =

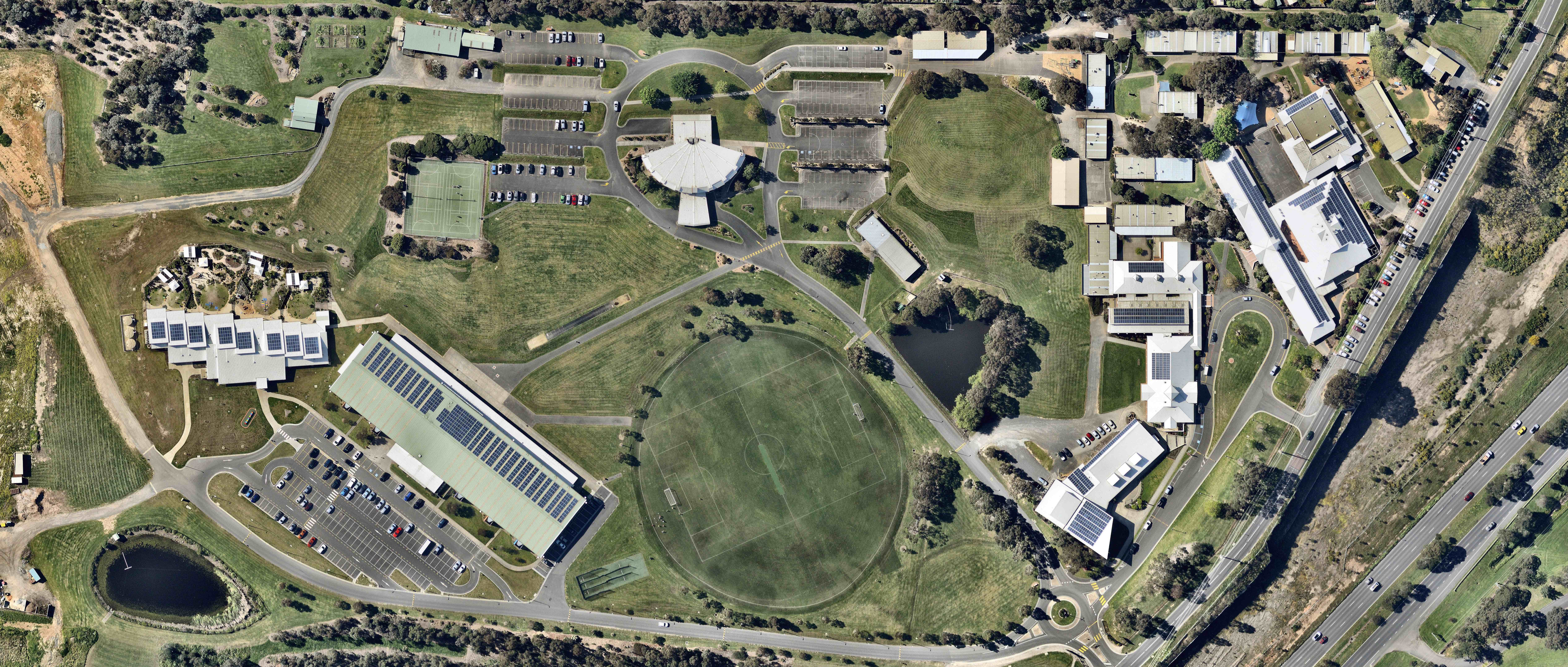

Location
- Chirnside Park, Victoria, 3116; Australia; 37°45′48″S 145°18′20″E

Information
- Type: Co-educational
- Motto: Wisdom and Virtue
- Denomination: Christian
- Founded: 1979
- Founder: Harold Knights Oxley
- Status: Open
- Principal: Mr Michael Bond
- Years offered: To Year 12
- Gender: Co-educational
- Enrolment: 1000 (28 January 2012)
- Classrooms: 46
- Houses: Gibeon Warriors (red), Tabor Trojans (white) and Zion Crusaders (blue)
- Colours: Blue, white, red
- Slogan: Wisdom and Virtue
- Song: Oxley Christian College School Song
- Affiliation: Eastern Independent Schools of Melbourne
- Website: www.oxley.vic.edu.au

Oxley Christian College is a private co-educational Christian school in Chirnside Park, Melbourne, Australia ranging from three-year-old kindergarten to Year 12.

== Structure ==
Oxley is a day school with a total enrolment of around 1000 students. The junior school includes the early childhood centre: Oxley Kids (three and four-year-old kinder), through to Year 6; the senior school encompasses Years 7 to 12.

== Extracurricular activities ==
=== Sport ===
Oxley is a member of the Eastern Independent Schools of Melbourne (EISM).

==== EISM premierships ====
Oxley has won the following EISM senior premierships.

Combined:

- Badminton – 2021
- Cross Country (2) – 2010, 2014

Boys:

- Basketball (6) – 2011, 2012, 2013, 2014, 2018, 2019
- Cricket (4) – 2008, 2009, 2010, 2011
- Cross Country – 2010
- Football 12's (2) – 2015, 2016
- Table Tennis – 2015
- Table Tennis – 2023

Girls:

- Basketball – 2014
- Cross Country (3) – 2010, 2014, 2015
- Hockey – 2012
- Netball (2) – 2008, 2011
- Soccer (4) – 2013, 2015, 2020, 2021
- Softball – 2011
- Tennis (2) – 2008, 2020
- Volleyball (2) – 2011, 2012
