= Luther College (Victoria) =

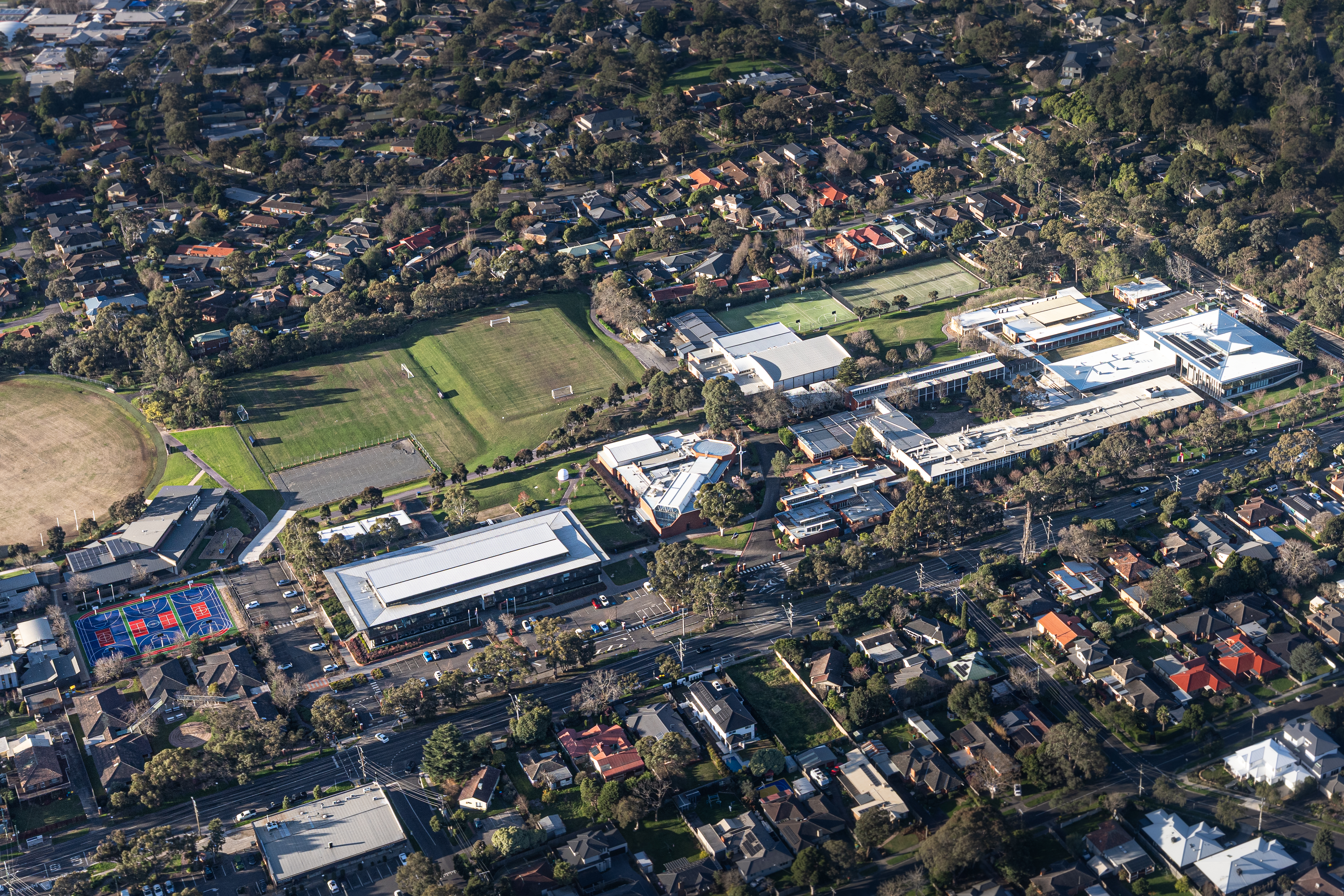
- Aerial view of Luther College with the new CCI building as seen to the right

Location
- 1–39 Plymouth Road; Croydon Hills, Victoria 3136; Australia; 37.7830°S 145.2726°E

Information
- Type: Independent
- Motto: Latin: Unctio eius Docet (The Holy Spirit is our Teacher)
- Denomination: Lutheran
- Established: 1964
- Principal: Jacqui Layfield
- Years offered: 7–12
- Gender: Co-educational
- Enrolment: 1219
- Houses: Birt, Cheong, Nelson, Warran, Wicklow, Yarra
- Colours: Red, white, blue
- Affiliation: Eastern Independent Schools of Melbourne
- Website: www.luther.vic.edu.au

Luther College is a co-educational independent secondary school of the Lutheran Church of Australia located in the outer-eastern suburb of Croydon Hills in Melbourne, Victoria, Australia. It maintains a close relationship with the Outer Eastern Lutheran Church parish of the Lutheran Church of Australia, which congregates in the school's chapel facilities. It provides education for years 7–12.

== History ==
Opened in 1964, Luther College is a school of the Lutheran Church of Australia, named for the father of the Lutheran Church, Dr. Martin Luther, a 16th-century German theologian.

Formerly a boarding school, Luther College accepted international and regional boarders in addition to local day students. However, after a decline in international enrollment and worries about the growth of the student body in relation to the school's facilities, the boarding program ended at the end of 2002, with the associated facilities subsequently adapted into classrooms or demolished.

== Religious education ==
As a school of the Lutheran Church of Australia, Luther College students participate in mandatory religious education classes (called Christian Studies) in years 7, 8, 10, 11, and 12. In Year 9 they complete a separate program called RITE Journey, which has religious aspects to it.

All students from all year levels attend a chapel service in the school's chapel three days out of the week, with one year level assembly per week and one day being an extended homegroup.

The school's campus contains a special Ministry Centre which contains the offices of the school's two chaplains and pastor as well as the school counsellor.

== Fees ==
The fees* for each year at Luther College are as follows:

Year Level	Cost 2026	Cost 2027
Year 7	$18,960	$21,353
Year 8	$19,970	$22,490
Year 9	$20,790	$23,414
Year 10	$21,720	$24,462
Year 11	$21,720	$24,462
Year 12	$21,720	$24,462

*$250 is taken off this amount if the student has a sibling/s already attending the school, and $600 if the family are practicing members of the Lutheran Church.

Student tuition makes up 67.3% of Luther College's income, with the remaining percentage coming from Government grants (30.7%), non-operating income (1.7%) and capital income (0.3%).

== Involvement with Good Shepherd Lutheran Primary School ==
Both Luther College and The Good Shepherd Lutheran Primary School are private schools, as well as schools of the Lutheran Church of Australia. Both their campuses are located in Croydon Hills, separated by two sporting ovals.

The schools share many of their facilities, including the sporting ovals, as well as the Luther College chapel which is used by the primary school for special occasions. The schools have very similar uniforms, and until 2004 their physical education uniforms were almost identical.

As many as 80% of Good Shepherd students attend Luther College after the completion of year 6, due to the school's close proximity. Due to this, students of the schools share a close relationship. Many collegiates undertake work experience or voluntary service placements at Good Shepherd, and both schools often present chapel services for each other.

== Sport ==
Luther is a member of the Eastern Independent Schools of Melbourne.

== Houses ==
Luther College has six houses allocated by the school to each student upon entry. Each house is allocated into nine homegroups, in which students are to attend every morning. These houses participate in sporting events such as cross country and athletics day and other social events such as public speaking.

House	Colour	Notes
Warran	Orange	One of the two founding houses for Luther. Reintroduced in 2021.
Yarra	Purple	One of the two founding houses for Luther. Reintroduced in 2021.
Birt	Blue	
Wicklow	Green	
Nelson	Yellow	
Cheong	Red	

=== EISM premierships ===
Luther has won the following EISM senior premierships.

Combined:

- Athletics (16) – 2003, 2004, 2005, 2006, 2009, 2010, 2011, 2012, 2013, 2014, 2015, 2016, 2017, 2018, 2019, 2021
- Cross Country (16) – 2001, 2002, 2003, 2004, 2006, 2009, 2010, 2011, 2012, 2013, 2014, 2015, 2016, 2017, 2018, 2019

Boys:

- Athletics (9) – 2005, 2006, 2009, 2010, 2011, 2012, 2018, 2019, 2021
- Basketball (7) – 1970, 1971, 1973, 1974, 1975, 1976, 2004
- Cricket (7) – 1971, 1988, 1990, 1996, 2013, 2014, 2018
- Cross Country (16) – 2000, 2001, 2002, 2003, 2004, 2009, 2010, 2011, 2012, 2013, 2014, 2015, 2016, 2017, 2018, 2019
- Football – 1976
- Handball – 2002
- Hockey (6) – 1992, 1994, 1995, 2003, 2004, 2006
- Indoor Soccer – 2008
- Soccer (3) – 1987, 1995, 2002
- Table Tennis (4) – 1978, 1982, 1984, 2015
- Tennis (5) – 1972, 1974, 1994, 1999, 2001
- Touch Rugby (4) – 2002, 2003, 2004, 2005
- Volleyball (7) – 1977, 1979, 1980, 1994, 1995, 1999, 2016

Girls:

- Athletics (15) – 2003, 2004, 2005, 2007, 2010, 2011, 2012, 2013, 2014, 2015, 2016, 2017, 2018, 2019, 2021, 2022, 2024
- Basketball (3) – 1977, 1978, 1986
- Bowling (2) – 2005, 2006
- Cricket – 2009
- Cross Country (17) – 2001, 2002, 2003, 2004, 2006, 2008, 2009, 2010, 2011, 2012, 2013, 2014, 2015, 2016, 2017, 2018, 2019
- Indoor Cricket – 2014
- Softball (2) – 1971, 1977
- Swimming (7) – 2000, 2012, 2014, 2015, 2019, 2020, 2021
- Tennis (9) – 1971, 1972, 1978, 1983, 1984, 1996, 2002, 2007, 2012
- Touch Rugby - 2022
- Volleyball (11) – 1977, 1989, 1992, 2001, 2002, 2003, 2004, 2005, 2015, 2016, 2017

Luther Year 9 EISM Premierships

Year 9 Boys:

- Badminton (3) - 2014, 2016, 2017
- Basketball (2) - 2014, 2019
- Football (2) - 2010, 2011
- Hockey (3) - 2013, 2014, 2017
- Indoor Cricket - 2017
- Lawn Bowls (4) - 2013, 2015, 2017, 2018
- Netball (4) - 2010, 2011, 2013, 2022
- Table Tennis (4) - 2011, 2013, 2017, 2019
- Touch Rugby (3) - 2011, 2014, 2016
- Soccer (3) - 2016, 2019, 2022
- Softball (3) - 2016, 2017, 2019
- Volleyball (6) - 2011, 2012, 2014, 2017, 2018, 2019

Year 9 Girls:

- Badminton - 2015
- Basketball (2) - 2013, 2016
- Football (2) - 2012, 2018
- Hockey (4) - 2012, 2013, 2014, 2015
- Indoor Cricket (5) - 2010, 2014, 2016, 2017, 2018
- Indoor Soccer - 2021
- Lawn Bowls (3) - 2016, 2017, 2018
- Netball - 2014
- Table Tennis (2) - 2016, 2017
- Tennis (6) - 2010, 2013, 2014, 2017, 2018, 2020
- Touch Rugby (5) - 2015, 2018, 2019, 2020, 2021
- Soccer - 2015
- Softball - 2013
- Ultimate Frisbee (2) - 2015, 2017
- Volleyball (6) - 2011, 2012, 2013, 2015, 2016, 2017

== Notable alumni ==
- 360 (Matthew Colwell) – hip hop artist
- Sarah Blanck – sailor
- Tom Boyd – former AFL player for the Western Bulldogs and the GWS Giants
- Greig Fraser – Oscar winning, Emmy Award–winning cinematographer
- Ash Grunwald – blues and roots artist
- Dan McStay, AFL footballer
- Kathleen O'Kelly-Kennedy – Paralympian (bronze medal, basketball, Beijing 2008)
