= Bialik College =

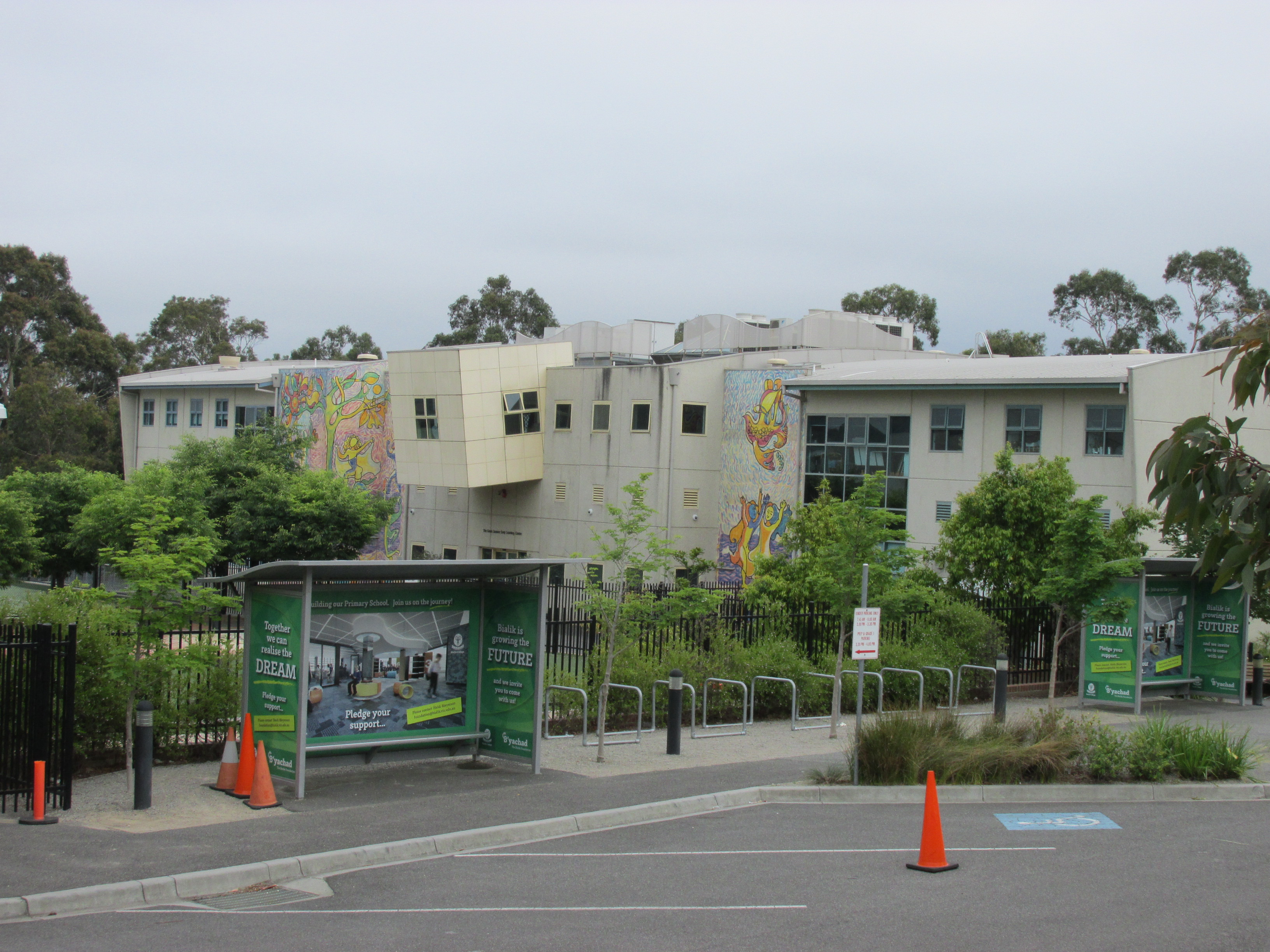
- Bialik College in 2014

Location
- Hawthorn, Melbourne, Victoria; Australia; 37°50′32″S 145°02′37″E

Information
- Type: private, comprehensive co-educational early learning, primary and secondary Jewish day school
- Motto: Step Forth With Courage and Be Your Best
- Religious affiliation: Pluralistic Judaism
- Denomination: Jewish
- Established: 1942; 84 years ago
- President: Tyson Wodak
- Principal: Jeremy Stowe-Lindner
- Years: Early learning; C–12
- Gender: Co-educational
- Enrolment: 1,070
- Colours: Blue and yellow
- Affiliation: Eastern Independent Schools of Melbourne
- Website: www.bialik.vic.edu.au

Bialik College is a private comprehensive co-educational early learning, primary and secondary Jewish day school, located in the Melbourne suburb of Hawthorn, Victoria, Australia. Established in 1942 in Carlton North, Victoria, the school has had a Zionist orientation since its inception, with the establishment of the State of Israel central to its identity. Bialik's approach to Judaism is pluralistic and cross-communal.

School capacity is more than 1,000 students, ranging from Creche to Year 12, with day care for children from three months to three years. Bialik offers the Victorian Certificate of Education (VCE).

Bialik is a member of the Eastern Independent Schools of Melbourne (EISM).

Bialik College has offered the VCE since 1990; the school has consistently been ranked as one of the top 10 in Victoria. As of December 2022, the school has been ranked in the top 5 in Victoria for 25 out of 26 years.

== Facilities ==
Bialik completed the 'Launch Lab' build in September 2023.

Since the late 1990s, Bialik has added a building to house its VCE department, an Early Learning Centre, the 'Besen Family Art & Technology Centre' and the 'Gringlas Sports Centre' to its campus. Additionally, the school has established the Rosenkranz Centre For Excellence and Achievement, aimed at providing enrichment and extension programs for students.

A new drama studio opened in 2010 and the Evelyn Hellen Library opened in early 2011. In 2011, a new Jewish Life Centre, The Mifgash, opened as part of the school's new Jewish Life and Informal Education initiative.

The three houses, Weizmann (Green), Szold (Yellow) and Herzl (Red), are mainly used for interhouse sports and are named for Chaim Weizmann, Henrietta Szold and Theodor Herzl.

== Notable alumni ==
- Josh Frydenberg, Australian politician who was the Treasurer of Australia and Deputy Leader of the Liberal Party from 2018 to 2022
- Anthony Goldbloom, founder and CEO of Kaggle
- Ben Zygier, an Australian-Israeli citizen who was a veteran of the Israel Defense Forces and allegedly an agent of Mossad.

== See also ==
- Judaism in Australia
- Reform Judaism
- List of non-government schools in Victoria
