= Eastern Independent Schools of Melbourne =

- Formation: 1964
- Headquarters: Melbourne, Victoria, Australia
- Members: 21 Member Schools
- Official language: English
- Executive Officer: Marissa Fillipou
- Website: www.eism.org

The Eastern Independent Schools of Melbourne (EISM) are a group of twenty one religious, independent secondary schools in Melbourne, Victoria, Australia. The schools compete against one another in sporting competitions.

== History ==
The first instance of the Independent Schools in the Eastern suburbs of Melbourne coming together is in 1964 as the Eastern Independent Schools Association. Initially the competition was for boys only, and the only sport offered was Australian Rules Football. It developed rapidly to include Athletics, Cross-Country and Swimming carnivals, Cricket, Tennis, and Debating. These competitions were held on Saturdays. The 1966 Swimming carnival was held at Croydon Memorial Pool on 5 March. Tennis, Softball and a Swimming carnival were contested for the first time in the 1971 season. The Boys by this stage had included Soccer, Basketball and Table Tennis into their sporting fixtures.

=== Cultural Component ===
Part of the original intention of the EISM was for it to have a cultural component for the boys. This took the form of a Music Festival. Students from all schools would meet at a central venue and give a performance. The girls also had the opportunity to do this and also participate in a Drama festival which was discontinued in 1982 due to lack of interest.

=== Amalgamation of EISA & EIGSA ===
In 1978, moves were initiated to combine the boys and girls competitions, with the 2 meeting formally in the middle of Term 2, 1978. After 12 months of joint meetings, the motion That there be an amalgamation of E.I.S.A. with E.I.G.S.A. to form one association was put to the principals' meeting on 8 August 1979. The motion was defeated. An alternative motion was then put which established a committee of principals and sport teachers whose task was to investigate the special needs of schools and also draw up a draft set of rules and regulations. The second draft of this committee had the name of the association as the ESISA, The Eastern Suburban Independent Schools Association. Eventually, the name Association of Eastern Independent Schools was agreed upon in April 1980.

== Schools ==
=== Current Member Schools ===
School	Location	Principal	Enrolment	Founded	Denomination	Year Entered Competition	School Colours
Alphington Grammar School	Alphington	Dr Vivianne Nikou	535	1989	Non-Denominational	1998	Blue, white and black
Aquinas College	Ringwood	David Broadbent	1,674	1961	Roman Catholic	1964	Black, red, gold and green
Bialik College	Hawthorn East	Jeremy Stowe-Lindner	877	1942	Jewish	1996	Navy, royal blue and gold
Billanook College	Mooroolbark	Roger Oates	704	1980	associated with the Uniting Church	1982	Navy, red and white
Donvale Christian College	Donvale	Rebecca Hall	1,357	1975	Non-Denominational	1996	Navy, white and green
Eltham College	Research	Richard Lisle	584	1973	Non-Denominational	? - 1997 and 2010	Sage, cream and cranberry
Emmaus College	Vermont South	Karen Jebb	1,313	1980	Roman Catholic	1989	Royal blue and gold
Huntingtower School	Mount Waverley	Shan Christensen	711	1927	Christian Science	1971	Light and dark blue
Kilvington Grammar School	Ormond	Rob French	830	1923	Baptist	2012	Navy, light blue, gold and magenta
The King David School	Armadale	Marc Light	568	1978	Jewish	2004	Old gold, navy and white
Kingswood College	Box Hill	Chrissy Gamble	582	1890	associated with the Uniting Church	1964	Navy, sky blue and gold
The Knox School	Wantirna South	Nikki Kirkup	588	1982	Non-Denominational	1991	Navy, gold and maroon
Luther College	Croydon	Jacqui Layfield	1,187	1964	Lutheran	1964	Royal blue, red and white
Mount Lilydale Mercy College	Lilydale	Philip Morison	1,511	1896	Roman Catholic	1970	Navy, gold and white
Mount Scopus Memorial College	Burwood	Dan Sztrajt	1,289	1949	Jewish	1989	Navy, sky blue and gold
Nunawading Christian College	Nunawading	Meggan James	400	1964	Seventh-day Adventist	2001	Maroon and navy
Oakleigh Grammar	Oakleigh	Mark Robertson	728	1983	Eastern Orthodox	1998	Maroon, gold and white
Oxley Christian College	Chirnside Park	Michael Bond	832	1979	Non-Denominational	2008	Red, navy and white
Plenty Valley Christian College	Doreen	John Metcalfe	740	1981	Non-Denominational	1997	Navy, green and white
Melbourne Rudolf Steiner School	Warranwood	No Principal	446	1972	Non-Denominational	1997	Royal blue and white
Tintern Grammar	Ringwood East	Bradley Fry	812	1877	Anglican	2003	Navy, green maroon and white

=== Former Member Schools ===
School	Location	Principal	Enrolment	Founded	Denomination	Years Competed	Colours
John Paul College	Frankston	John Visentin	1194	1979	Roman Catholic	1980-1986	Navy and old gold
Lilydale Adventist Academy	Lilydale	Tanya Pascoe		1964		2001–2010	Navy and sky blue
Loyola College	Watsonia	Alison Leutchford (acting principal)	1,333	1980	Roman Catholic	1991–1997	Royal blue, white and maroon
Mater Christi College	Belgrave	Maria Haggett	850	1963	Roman Catholic	1977–?	Navy, sky blue and white
Mazenod College	Mulgrave	Dr Paul Shannon	1,469	1967	OMI	1968–1998	Black, white and blue
Mt Evelyn Christian School	Montrose	Michelle Dempsey	693	1973	Non-Denominational	Associate	Teal, white and navy
Our Lady of Sion College	Box Hill	Tina Apostolopoulos	950	1928	Roman Catholic	?–1997	Cherry, black and white
Sacred Heart Girls' College	Oakleigh	Christopher Dalton	1000	1957	Roman Catholic	1980s–?	Navy, red and white
Salesian College	Chadstone	Mark Ashmore	982	1957	Salesian	1966–67, 1984–1998	Navy, red and grey
St Bede's College	Mentone	Deborah Frizza	1,882	1938	Lasallian	1987–1997	Blue, red and gold
St John's Regional College	Dandenong	Tim Hogan	650	1958	Roman Catholic	1983–1986	Navy, green and gold
St Joseph's College	Ferntree Gully	Catherine Livingstone	991	1965	Salesian	1966–2016	Navy and yellow
St Leonard's College	Brighton East	Peter Clague	1,426	1914	Uniting Church	?–1997	Navy and green
St Leo's College	Box Hill	Defunct			Roman Catholic	1964–1994	Royal blue and white
St Michael's Grammar School	St Kilda	Gerard Houlihan	1,204	1895	Anglican	1980–1997	Navy, red and white
St Thomas More College	Forest Hill	Defunct			Roman Catholic	1966–1979	
Wesley College	Glen Waverley	Nicholas Evans	3,400	1866	Associated with the Uniting Church	Associate	Purple and gold
Whitefriars College	Donvale	Mark Murphy	1,055	1961	Carmelite	1964–1998	Brown, gold and navy
Westbourne Grammar School	Truganina	Adrian Camm	1,479	1867	Non-Denominational	?–1997	Navy, green and gold
Yarra Valley Grammar School	Ringwood	Dr. Mark Merry	1,268	1966	Anglican	1967–68, 1987–1997	Red, gold and black

=== Eastern Independent Girls Schools Association (1970–1980) ===
There was a push for girls to have access to inter-school sport, and after extensive meetings in 1970 the following schools formed the EIGSA:

School	Years Competed
Aquinas College	1970–1977
Chavoin College	1970–1979
Huntingtower School	1970–1980
Luther College	1970–1980
Kingwood College	1978
Mater Christi College	1977
Mt Lilydale Mercy College	1970–?
Mount Scopus Memorial College	1970–?
Our Lady of Sion College	1970–?

== Carnivals ==
=== Swimming – Division 1 ===
School	No. Championships
Huntingtower	13 (2016, 2015, 2014, 2013, 2012, 2011, 2010, 2009, 2003, 2002, 2001, 2000 (c), 1999 (c) )
St Michael's	10 (1996, 1995, 1994, 1993, 1992, 1991, 1990, 1988, 1987, 1986)
Mount Scopus	7 (1985, 1984, 1983, 1982, 1981, 1980, 1979)
Tintern	5 (2008, 2007, 2006, 2005, 2004)
Billanook	2 (2000 (e), 1998)
Aquinas	1 (1999 (e) )
Eltham College	1 (1989)
(c)	Central Division
(e)	Eastern Division

=== Athletics – Division 1 ===
School	No. Championships
Aquinas College	17 (2008, 2007, 2002, 2001, 2000, 1999, 1994, 1992, 1991, 1990, 1989, 1988, 1987, 1986, 1985, 1984, 1983)
Luther College	12 (2016, 2015, 2014, 2013, 2012, 2011, 2010, 2009, 2006, 2005, 2004, 2003)
St Leonard's College	3 (1997, 1996, 1993)
Kingswood College	2 (2000, 1999)
Yarra Valley Grammar School	1 (1998)
Mount Lilydale Mercy College	1 (1995)

=== Cross Country ===
Note that schools are divided into three separate divisions which are determined by student population rather than level of ability.

- Eastern Division (1990–present)
- Central Division (1998–present)
- Southern Division (2013–present)

School	Division	No. Championships
Huntingtower School	Central	15 (2015, 2013, 2012, 2011, 2009, 2008, 2007, 2006, 2005, 2004, 2003, 2002, 2001, 2000, 1999)
Luther College	Eastern	13 (2016, 2015, 2014, 2013, 2012, 2011, 2010, 2009, 2006, 2004, 2003, 2002, 2001)
Aquinas College	Eastern	10 (2008, 2007, 2005, 2000, 1999, 1998, 1995, 1992, 1991, 1990)
Melbourne Rudolf Steiner School	Southern	3 (2016, 2015, 2014)
Donvale Christian College	Central	3 (2016, 2002, 1998)
Oxley Christian College	Central	2 (2014, 2010)
Mount Lilydale Mercy College	Central	2 (1994, 1993)
St Leonard's College	Eastern	2 (1997, 1996)
Alphington Grammar School	Southern	1 (2013)

== Presidents of the Association ==
Term	President	School
2012 – 2014	Mr Sholto Bowen	Huntingtower School
2014 – 2016	Mr Mark Robertson	Oakleigh Grammar School

== Sports ==
Students from Eastern Independent Schools of Melbourne participate in a wide range of sporting activities including:

Weekly sports

- Badminton
- Basketball
- Cricket
- Football
- Hockey
- Indoor cricket
- Indoor soccer
- Lawn bowls
- Netball
- Soccer
- Softball
- Table tennis
- Tennis
- Touch football
- Ultimate frisbee
- Volleyball

Carnivals

- Swimming
- Track and field
- Cross country

== See also ==
- List of schools in Victoria, Australia
