= Edinburgh College (Lilydale, Victoria) =

Location
- Lilydale, Melbourne; Australia; 37°47′05″S 145°21′07″E

Information
- Former name: Lilydale Adventist Academy; Edinburgh Adventist Primary School
- Type: private school co-educational early learning, primary and secondary day school
- Motto: In Him we live
- Religious affiliation: Australian Union Conference of Seventh-day Adventists
- Denomination: Seventh-day Adventist
- Established: 1964; 62 years ago
- Principal: Tanya Pascoe
- Acting Head of Secondary: Adrian Stiles
- Head of Primary: Kirah Bradley
- Director of Early Learning: Rachel Wheelan
- Years: Early leaning; and K–12
- Area: 19 hectares (48 acres)
- Colours: Navy blue, yellow and red
- Affiliation: Eastern Independent Schools of Melbourne
- Website: www.edinburghcollege.vic.edu.au

Edinburgh College is a private co-educational early learning, primary and secondary day school, located in the outer-eastern Melbourne suburb of Lilydale, Victoria, Australia. The school is operated by the Seventh-day Adventist Church and was formerly two separate schools: Lilydale Adventist Academy and Edinburgh Adventist Primary School. It is a part of the Seventh-day Adventist education system, the world's second largest Christian school system.

== History ==
W. J. Gilson, the foundation principal of Lilydale Adventist Academy, first suggested the need for a Seventh-day Adventist boarding school on the eastern seaboard of Australia in the early 1940s. However, it was not until the late 1950s that the project gained momentum. A suitable 19-hectare (48-acre) property was located in the Lilydale area. Originally the property was part of the Mitchell estate and was built by the sister of Dame Nellie Melba. Located on the property was the caretaker's cottage set on green lawns. This cottage remains a feature of the school campus.

Building of Lilydale Adventist Academy's facilities commenced in 1963. The builders, a Mr Crabb and his team, worked to complete the school facilities in time for the commencement of the school year on 10 February 1964. In operation at the commencement of the 1964 school year were school administration and classroom facilities, and a boys' dormitory. At the same time, four staff homes were constructed on the property by a Mr Stoneman and a Mr Epps. The girl's dormitory was added and in operation at the commencement of the 1966 school year. Subsequent building projects have included: cafeteria, student chapel, art and technology facility, science facility, assembly hall and gymnasium.

Recent developments have been the construction of Edinburgh Adventist Primary School and the Edinburgh Early Learning Centre providing continuity of education for two-year-olds through to Year 12. Refurbishment of the science labs and, more recently, the art and technology facility and a new Library Resource Centre enhance educational opportunities. The old girls' dormitory is now a large language centre and the old boys' dormitory is set up as music room, home economics and textiles and middle school. There is a library which was added two years before the Language Centre was completed and it has a large range of books for all years from ELC to VCE. Lilydale Adventist Academy is now a day school – the boarding program has been phased out over the last few years. Planning is underway for Lilydale Adventist Academy to further develop its facilities to meet the learning needs of students in the 21st century.

Billy Cart Grand Prix

The Weet-Bix Billy Cart Grand Prix is an event with over 3,000 competitors which occurs at Lilydale Adventist Academy. The Billy Cart Grand Prix has stopped running as of 2012.

== Spiritual aspects ==
All students take religion classes each year that they are enrolled. These classes cover topics in biblical history and Christian and denominational doctrines. Instructors in other disciplines also begin each class period with prayer or a short devotional thought, many which encourage student input. Weekly, the entire student body gathers together for an hour-long chapel service. Outside the classrooms there is year-round spiritually oriented programming that relies on student involvement.

== Subjects ==
This school offers various subjects such as English, Mathematics at four levels (Foundation, General, Methods and Specialist), all core sciences (Biology, Chemistry and Physics), Business Management, Psychology, Sport and Recreation, Physical Education, Systems Engineering, Music, Drama, Human Health and Development, Legal Studies, Art Creative Practise, Product Design and Technologies, LOTE, Accounting, Bible, Religion and Society, Environmental Science, Food Studies, Ancient History and Geography.

== See also ==
- List of schools in Victoria, Australia
- Seventh-day Adventist education
- List of Seventh-day Adventist secondary schools
