= Eltham College (Victoria) =

Location
- Research & Lonsdale Street, Victoria, Australia; 37.7008°S 145.1926°E

Information
- Type: private, co-educational, day school
- Denomination: Non-denominational
- Established: 1973
- Principal: Richard Lisle
- Grades: K–12
- Gender: Co-educational
- Enrolment: ~1,200
- Houses: Bell; Evelyn; Nillumbik; Ross
- Colours: Cranberry, cream & sage
- Affiliation: Eastern Independent Schools of Melbourne
- Publications: College Connections; Forum Magazine
- School song: We're All Different People
- Website: http://www.elthamcollege.vic.edu.au

Eltham College is a private, non-denominational, co-educational day school situated in Research, an outer suburb north east of Melbourne, Australia.

Founded in 1973, the school has a non-selective admissions policy and currently caters for approximately 1,200 students from Kindergarten to Year 12.

Although no longer a part, having become an affiliate of the EISM (Eastern Independent Schools of Melbourne), Eltham College is a founding member of the ACS (Association of Co-educational Schools). The College is also affiliated with the Association of Independent Schools of Victoria (AISV).

The school is also associated with EC Waves swimming club and most training is held at the Eltham College pool.

== Houses ==
Eltham College houses
House name	Colour
Bell	Green
Evelyn	Yellow
Nillumbik	Blue
Ross	Red

== Alumni ==
=== Sports ===
- Elyse Villani – Australia cricketer
- Warwick Draper – K1 Kayak Slalom Olympian
- Jamie Whincup – V8 Supercar Champion
- Sam Switkowski - AFL footballer Fremantle Football Club
- Nicholas Driscoll - AFL Footballer Geelong Footballer club
- Harry Van Hattum - AFL Footballer Richmond Football Club

=== Media, entertainment, and the arts ===
- Alexandra Adornetto – Children's Author
- Montana Cox – Winner of Australia's Next Top Model 2011
- Blair McDonough – Actor on Neighbours
- Em Rusciano – Comedian, singer, and radio presenter
