= Sylvia Walton =

Australian academic administrator (1941–2024)

Sylvia Walton AO, FACE
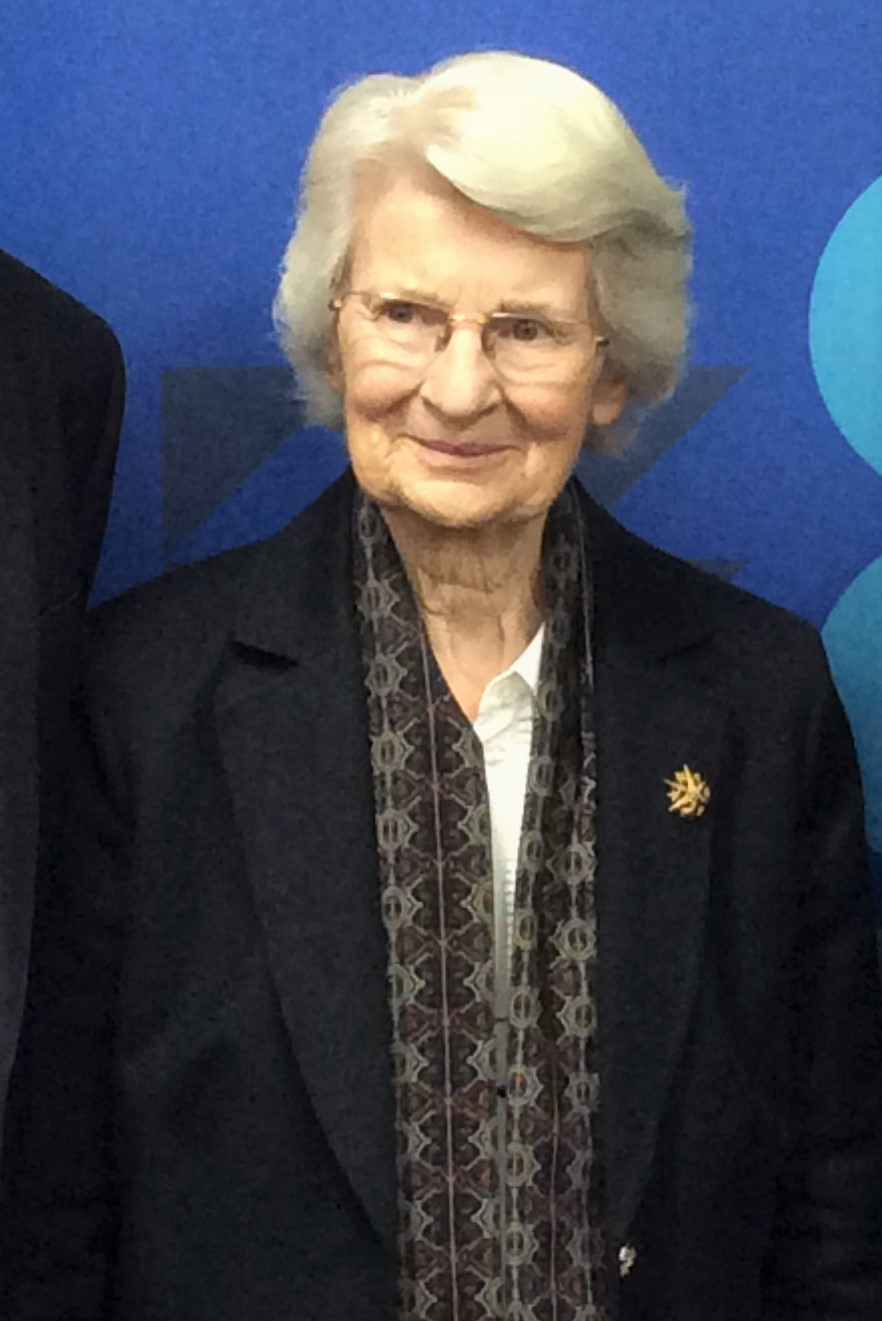

Chancellor of La Trobe University
- In office 1 April 2006 – 25 February 2011
- Preceded by: Nancy Millis
- Succeeded by: Adrienne Clarke

Personal details
- Born: 16 January 1941 Sydney, New South Wales, Australia
- Died: 27 January 2024 (aged 83) Melbourne, Victoria, Australia

Dr Sylvia Jane Walton, AO, FACE (née Collis) (16 January 1941 – 27 January 2024) was chancellor of La Trobe University (2006–2011), principal of Tintern Grammar (1982–2005) and principal of St Catherine's School from 2007 to 2013.

== Biography ==
The daughter of Ronald Ferguson Collis (1914–2001), and Ellen Betty Collis (1917–2009), née Moroney, Sylvia Walton completed a BA, MA and Dip Ed from Sydney University and a B Ed from La Trobe University. In 2011 she was awarded a Doctor of Education (honoris causa) in recognition for her outstanding leadership as chancellor and council member of La Trobe University, and in addressing issues of access in higher education for students from disadvantaged backgrounds.

Walton was principal of Tintern Schools in Ringwood from 1982 to 2005. In 1999 she established Southwood Boys Grammar School as a complementary school to Tintern.

Walton was principal of St Catherine's School from 2007 to 2013.

Walton was chancellor of La Trobe University from 2006 to 2011. In 2019, she and her husband Robin Walton established the Sylvia Walton Honours Scholarship for autistic students to undertake their research at the Olga Tennison Autism Research Centre at La Trobe. The university also established the Sylvia Walton Equity and Diversity Annual Public Lecture in recognition of her outstanding leadership at the university. In 2014 the university named the Sylvia Walton Building in her honour. The Australian College of Educators Victorian branch holds an annual Sylvia Walton oration.

Walton died on 27 January 2024.

== Honours and awards ==
- 1998 Sir James Darling Medal for Education (across Primary, Secondary and Tertiary areas) Australian College of Educators (Vic)
- 2000 Paul Harris Medal for Services to Rotary Student Programmes
- 2003 Officer of the Order of Australia (AO) for "service to education at secondary and tertiary levels, particularly through research into specialised curriculum and training programmes, as an administrator, and as a contributor to the development of education policy in both government and non-government sectors".
- 2004 - Distinguished Alumni Award (M.L.C. Burwood, Sydney)
- 2007 - ACEL Gold Medal. The most prestigious award conferred by the Australian Council for Educational Leaders is the gold medal.
- 2014 Victorian Honour Roll of Women

Academic offices
Preceded by Nancy Millis	Chancellor of La Trobe University; 2006–2011	Succeeded by Adrienne Clarke
