= Stephanie Payne =

Australian blogger (born 1980)

Stephanie Louise Payne (born 23 January 1980) is an Australian blogger best known for her campaigns against bullying and anti social behaviour, particularly of overweight people, and for charity. Payne herself was overweight, but she lost much weight after treatment.

== Weight loss ==
At her heaviest, Payne weighed 243 kg (534.6 pounds). She underwent Laparoscopic surgery (lap band) on 17 November 2010. As of 2012 she was the heaviest female patient treated by Dr Jason Winnett.

Payne began writing about her weight loss in August 2010, shortly after discovering that she weighed 243 kg, and published an online blog about the stages of her weight loss.

== Career ==
Payne has been in the Public Service since 2002 and currently works for the Department of Human Services.

== Media ==
Payne has contributed a number of articles to Melbourne's mX newspaper and appeared on Channel 7's Today Tonight to speak of being told she should buy 2 tickets when using public transport as she takes up more than one seat. Since then her description of the harassment, victimisation, discrimination and humiliation that morbidly obese people experience has been reported in several publications.

== Charity involvement ==
=== Stair climb ===
Payne climbed the 46 floors of the Melbourne Central Tower in 47 minutes on 22 August 2011, two days after her grandmother died from pancreatic cancer. She raised almost $4,000 for the Cancer Council of Victoria.

=== Relay for Life ===
Payne participated in her the Cancer Council's Relay For Life on 2 April 2011 and her second on 5 November 2011, raising almost A$1,000. She has committed to participating in at least three relays per year to support the Cancer Council and their research into Cancer treatments and support for Patients and Carers.

=== Freecycle ===
Payne established Melton Freecycle, a part of The Freecycle Network. Melton Freecycle contributed to the Melton Shire Council winning the Keep Australia Beautiful Victoria's (KABV) Sustainable City Award for 2007.

=== 'For Fiona' ===
Stephanie Payne raised over $30,000 for her friends 4 children after she was allegedly murdered by her ex-partner. Stephanie started a group on Facebook called 'For Fiona' https://www.facebook.com/forfionawarzywoda appealing to the public encouraging them to donate to raise money for the children to buy essentials to make it easier to settle into their new life. Stephanie raised awareness for the appeal by agreeing to the media including Neil Mitchell http://www.3aw.com.au/blogs/neil-mitchell-blog/im-not-good-my-mums-dead-donations-flood-for-struggling-kids/20140423-3731m.html, 'The Age' Newspaper https://www.theage.com.au/national/victoria/children-of-sunshine-stabbing-victim-lack-basics-20140423-373dt.html and the primetime news channels such as channel 9 https://web.archive.org/web/20140910215840/http://video.au.msn.com/watch/video/donations-pour-in-for-fiona-warzywoda-s-children/xyqi5qr?cpkey=557e026e-f359-4bba-bbeb-6b02d00317cb%257c%257c%257c%257c https://web.archive.org/web/20150114155214/http://www.melton.starweekly.com.au/story/1803130/call-to-support-children-of-slain-mum-fiona-warzywoda/

== Personal life ==
Payne is a granddaughter of Dame Phyllis Frost. She married Bradley Lowdell in August 2008. The couple have four children.
