= Oakleigh Grammar =

Location
- Willesden Road; Oakleigh, Victoria 3166; Australia; 37°53′45″S 145°4′58″E

Information
- Type: Independent, co-educational
- Motto: Greek: ΠΙΣΤΙΣ & ΣΟΦΙΑ, romanized: Pistis kai Sofia (Faith and Wisdom)
- Denomination: Greek Orthodox
- Established: 1983; 43 years ago
- Principal: Mark Robertson
- Years: K–12
- Gender: Co-educational
- Enrolment: 589
- Colours: Maroon and gold
- School fees: $9,000–$12,000
- Affiliation: Independent School of Victoria
- Website: www.oakleighgrammar.vic.edu.au

Oakleigh Grammar is an independent Christian school in the Melbourne, Australia suburb of Oakleigh. It is an International Baccalaureate World School which currently caters for 800 students from Early Learning [ELC] to year 12.

The school was founded in 1983 commencing with a year level range of Prep to Year 8. It expanded to a full Independent School offering education from Kindergarten to year 12 in 1999. The name was changed from Oakleigh Greek Orthodox College to Oakleigh Grammar on 1 January 2012.

== Sport ==
Oakleigh Grammar is a member of the Eastern Independent Schools of Melbourne (EISM) and competes in the Southern Division. It is also a member of Bentleigh Districts Association in the Primary Division. In 2022 the Primary Years 5/6 Soccer team was declared State Champions.

=== EISM premierships ===
Oakleigh Grammar has won the following EISM premierships.

Boys:

- Basketball (2) – 2015, 2016
- Cross Country (4) – 2001, 2002, 2003, 2004
- Soccer (12) – 1998, 1999, 2004, 2005, 2006, 2013, 2014, 2015, 2016, 2017, 2019, 2026
- Table Tennis (3) – 2000, 2013, 2019
- Tennis (2) – 1999, 2016
- Volleyball (7) – 1999, 2004, 2005, 2006, 2013, 2016, 2017

Girls:

- Basketball – 2013
- Cross Country – 2013
- Netball – 2018
- Soccer (4) – 2015, 2017, 2020, 2026
- Soccer five-a-side (4) – 2015, 2016, 2017, 2018
- Softball – 2014
- Table Tennis (5) – 2015, 2016, 2017, 2018, 2019
- Volleyball (6) – 2009, 2013, 2015, 2016, 2017, 2018, 2022
- Indoor Soccer [Futsal] – 2022
