= Commonwealth Register of Institutions and Courses for Overseas Students =

Register formed under the Education Services for Overseas Students (ESOS) Act 2000

- Country of origin: Australia
- Owner: Australian Government
- Industry: Education
- Website: https://cricos.education.gov.au/
- Registration: Online application
- Launched: 2000

The Commonwealth Register of Institutions and Courses for Overseas Students (CRICOS) is a register formed under the Education Services for Overseas Students (ESOS) Act 2000. It maintains a list of institutions, and courses, which have been granted permission by states and territories, to educate overseas students. It is a Federal framework under the authority of state and territory jurisdiction, and providers must register through these agents to legally educate and train international students. CRICOS, in conjunction with other federal and state/territory bodies and legislation, provides strict guidelines for institutions, accepts and/or declines registrations, monitors registered institutions’ compliance and ensures financial capability and stability.

== History ==
=== 1997–1998 ===
In 1997, the Howard government coordinated a response to shortages in skilled workers in Australia and undertook a complete restructure of the Migration Program. In 1998, the Immigration Minister announced a $21 million marketing campaign over 4 years to promote a student visa program that allowed international students and workers to be granted visas to fill the gaps in Australia’s workplaces. Under reforms to the program, immigration policy and student visa grant requirements became "less specific" to allow more overseas workers to obtain visas. The amendments stated that international students who studied higher education in Australia would receive bonus points when applying for working visas.

=== 2000 ===
In 2000, the Education Services for Overseas Students (ESOS) Act was formed, discussing educational opportunities for overseas students, assisting in preparing and prompting them to apply for jobs that addressed national labour shortages. International students studying in Australia increased by 15% per year between the years 1997 and 2003. ESOS 2000 put in place protections regarding student prepaid fees, education providers and students’ safety and visa preparation. Before 1990, accreditation of educational services was under the Federal Department of Employment, Education and Training scope. From 1 January 1990, it became the responsibility of states and territories to allow institutions and courses to cater to overseas students. With an increase in 1990 to 44,000 full-fee paying international students requests under the Migration Program, CRICOS was formed from requirements and needs of the ESOS Act, releasing the pressure placed on state and territory governments. CRICOS lists the institutions and courses registered with the government to provide educational services to overseas students to assist students in obtaining additional visa points to then work in Australia. It is compulsory for any who wish to educate international students to register with CRICOS.

=== 2001–present ===
2001 led to further reforms of the Migration Program, making onshore visa applications more accessible to students and increasing the number of people applying to undertake courses in Australia which were experiencing a skills shortage. The National Code of Practice for Registration Authorities and Training for Overseas Students (2001) was implemented and set out more detailed guidelines and requirements for education providers and developed the set of rules related to CRICOS.

== Amendments ==
=== Problems with ESOS and CRICOS ===
In 2003, 303,324 full-fee international student enrolments were issued in Australia. This increase led to issues of quality in education provision and student welfare in the sector. A report/review by the Australian Government, titled the Baird Review, outlined issues regarding Australian international education, stating the potential vulnerability of international students within Australia. The report set out key issues within ESOS legislation as well as the CRICOS framework, expressing increasing concern around the international education sector and its regulation, especially during the 2008 financial crisis, incidents involving the safety of students and the continued questioning of the quality of providers. The review was intended for 2010, however reports in 2009 of attacks and incidents involving Indian students, and negative accounts from India, prompted the government to release the review earlier. Student welfare and the quality of Australian education institutions were questioned in the review as a potential factor towards what police described as "largely opportunistic and not primarily racially motivated" attacks. The review also stated it heard inquiries surrounding a "lack of information" as well as "false and misleading information" from educational providers. It identified there was a need for CRICOS and its regulators to "raise the bar" for international educators and the requirements these institutions must meet to either enter or remain in the sector.

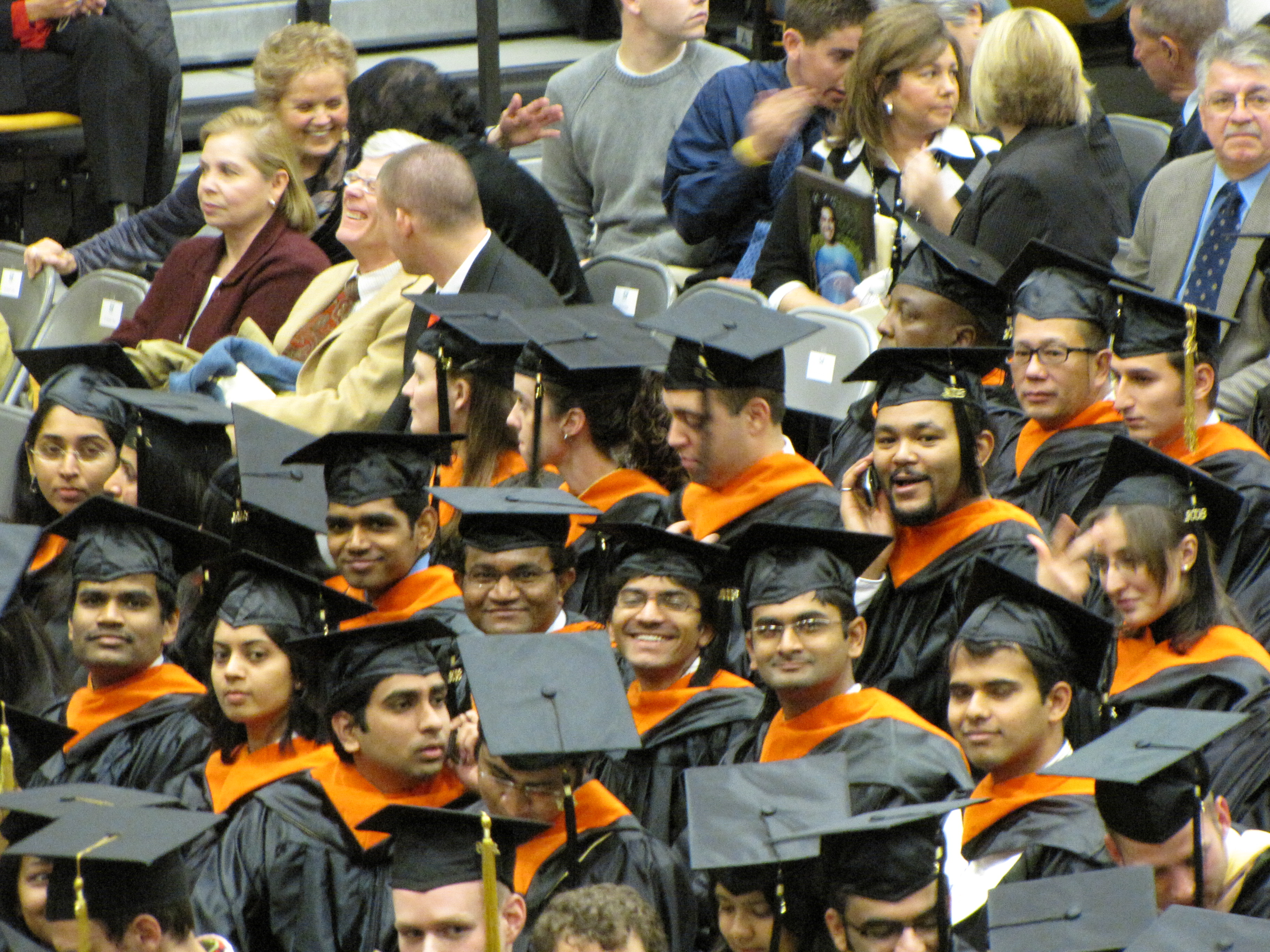
Graduating students

=== Reforms ===
ESOS and CRICOS amendments were made effective in February 2010. Two new criteria were implemented to ensure education was the primary purpose of institutions and they could provide such services adequately. In addition, new registration requirements were implemented under CRICOS for providers, certifying the quality of the education sector, defending the register and ensuring the primary purpose of institutions and their courses is to educate. Any providers wishing to register in CRICOS must have confirmed their ability under relevant state and territory officials. In conjunction with CRICOS and its authorities, reforms included the establishment of the Tertiary Education Quality Standards Agency and the Australian Skills Quality Authority to provide an additional layer of protection for the overseas education industry as well as being another regulatory body that assesses providers. Under amendments, all institutions and their courses must have re-registered through CRICOS by 31 December 2010 if they wished to continue educating overseas students. Conjointly, all providers are limited to five years of registration before having to re-apply, showing their continued ability to meet education and financial requirements and additional regulations.

== ELICOS ==
English Language Intensive Courses for Overseas Students (ELICOS) is a course offered to international students to increase english proficiency levels. All English courses provided to non-student visa holders are not considered ELICOS programs. In 2011, ELICOS became legislation under ESOS and extended to the regulation of CRICOS providers. It is not required to be a registered training organisation to provide ELICOS, but the courses offered must be registered under CRICOS. All ELICOS providers must pay all ASQA and CRICOS fees in addition to Department of Education, Skills and Employment charges. All providers must adhere to the National Standards for ELICOS providers and courses guidelines (ELICOS Standards) and are subject to all additional recommendations and requirements related to CRICOS registration, ESOS legislation and external regulation. In 2017, new ELICOS standards were approved for implementation on 1 March 2018, applying to new, existing and future providers. It covers mandatory requirements for course applications, contact hours, training, staffing and resources for all courses.

== Criteria and registration ==
Registration through CRICOS requires institutions and courses to meet the guidelines distinguished under the ESOS Act and the National Code. Under 2010 reforms to the ESOS Act, providers are required to show their ability to educate and that their primary purpose in registering through CRICOS is to provide educational services. All registrations must be renewed every five years and each institution must provide a completed list of all education agents who promote and represent their educational services. As per registration guidelines, there are 6 criteria which must be met and maintained by all CRICOS registered institutions.

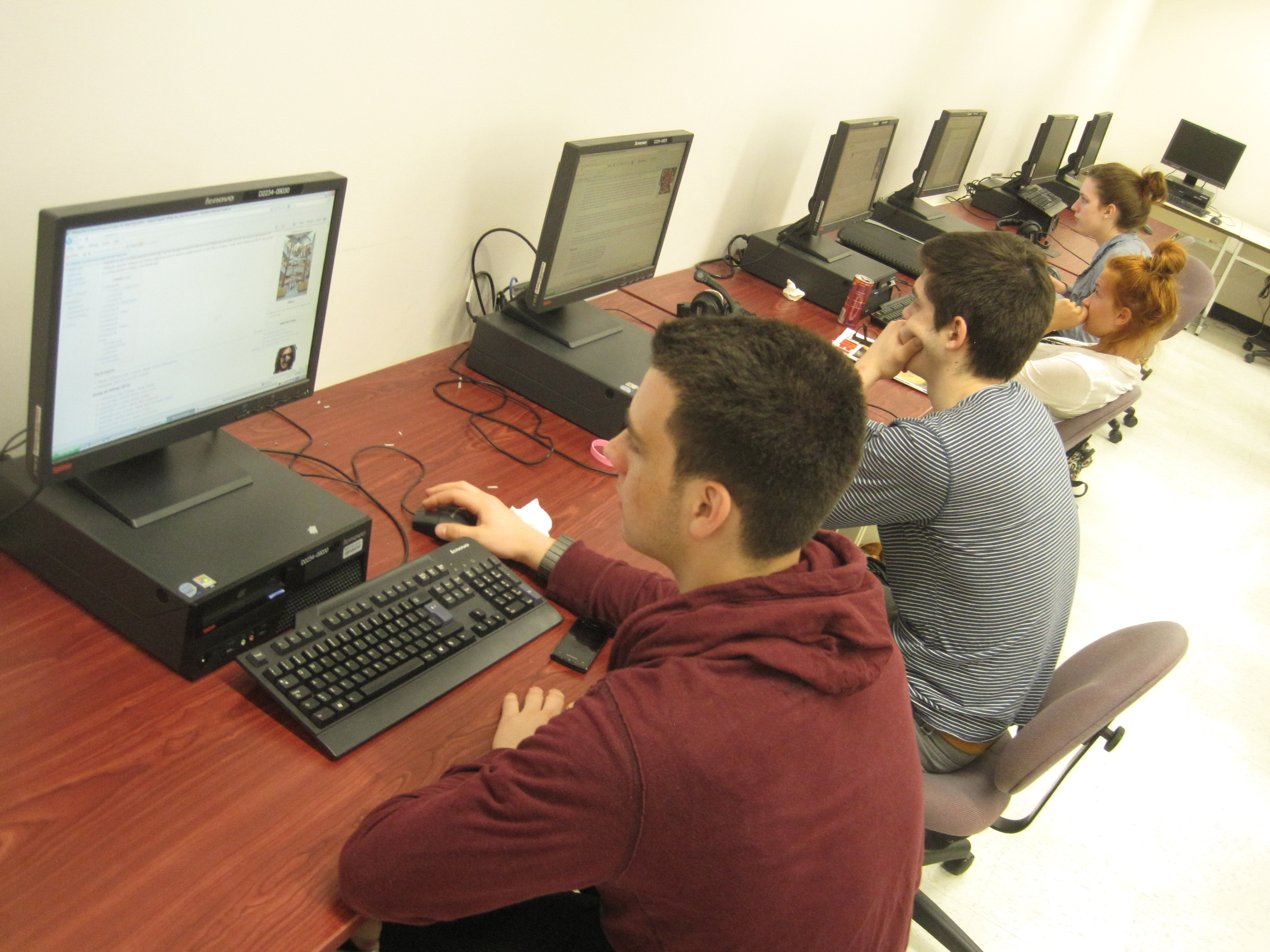
Work in the computer lab

=== Guideline 1: legislative obligations ===
All registered institutions must adhere to the following legislative frameworks:

- Education Services for Overseas Students Act 2000
- Education Services for Overseas Students Regulations 2019
- Education Services for Overseas Students (Registration Changes) Act 1997
- National Code of Practice for Providers of Education and Training to Overseas Students 2018
- National Standards for Foundation Programs
- ELICOS Standards 2018

Under the various frameworks, education providers are required to meet all standards at all times.

=== Guideline 2: Quality of training experience ===
The Australian Skills Quality Authority (ASQA) assesses training providers and their practices regarding student experience and compliance. They distinguish five key stages of a learning experience for students. They include:

- Marketing and Recruitment: institutions must ensure students are recruited responsibly, having made informed decisions based on adequate information, including on prerequisites, and have all agreements in writing regarding enrolment, rights and obligations.
- Enrolment: all students must be informed on their course, the requirements of the university in regards to their study, their rights and responsibilities, tuition and fees, and any further information.
- Support and Progression: All students must be assisted during the progression of their course, with institutions required to have services on all information regarding adjusting to life, managing of accidents, the requirements of courses and participation, and how the provider will monitor progress during the course.

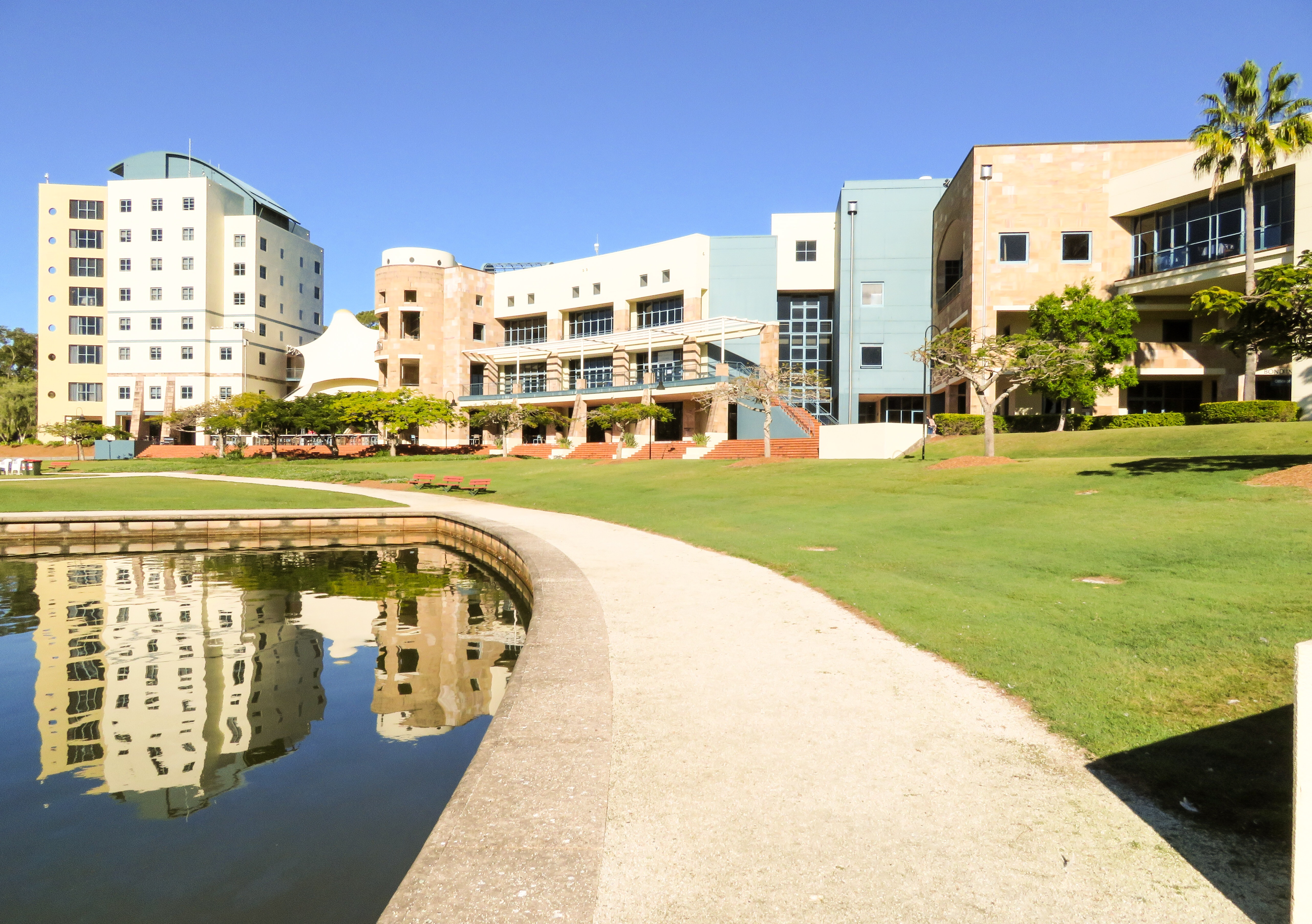
University Centre and South Tower student accommodation

- Training and Assessment: all registered providers must maintain procedures which ensure students receive skills and knowledge training, have a minimum of 20 contact hours a week, have two-thirds of VET units face-to-face, and all assessments and assessors meet the requirements of the course.
- Completion: providers must assess all transfers and issue statements regarding course attainment, as well as have procedures in place for all students to complete all assessment and course requirements before certification, to ensure students are eligible to receive qualifications.

=== Guideline 3: reporting obligations summary ===
Registered institutions and courses must report all student information including "accepted students, non-commencement, termination, changes to identity or duration and any breaches of visa conditions". Further, they must report "education agents, already accepted students, deferrals, courses not starting when expected, changes to courses, tuition fees".

=== Guideline 4: provider default obligations ===
Provider default is on the occasion a student has not withdrawn from studies but the provider either no longer provides a course on an agreed day or at a location. Institutions must, on this occasion, either issue a refund or place students in an alternative course.

=== Guideline 5: education agents ===
ASQA acknowledges the use of education agents by registered institutions, however, they hold no responsibility for their regulation. As such, under CRICOS, all providers must monitor their agents’ activities, ensuring the recruiting undertaken meets all guidelines listed in legislation and written agreements between the two. Organisations must obtain a permanent list of all associated education agents and report any non-compliance as a strict liability offence. All agreements between providers and agents must be in writing and it is the institutions role to regulate, report and terminate agreements with agents, including on grounds of misleading practice, unethical and dishonest behaviour, or any other actions undertaken which are not in "good faith" or which benefit students.

=== Guideline 6: protected amount ===
All CRICOS providers must generate and maintain an alternative bank account for all funds, tuition and fees from overseas students who have yet to commence their course or are in the process of completing their course. The account is to be managed by an authorised deposit-taking institution or a state bank and must not fall below the total cost of fees required to refund students in full in the event of visa refusal, student default, and any other agreed upon circumstances. ASQA is under the legal obligation to take legal action against CRICOS institutions if not compliant.

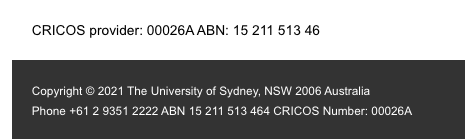
Example of CRICOS provider number

== Fees and charges ==
All compulsory fees and charges associated with CRICOS registration are laid out in the ESOS Act and the Education Services for Overseas Students (Registration Charges) Act 1997 (the Charges Act).

=== Entry to the Market Charge ===
During the first three years of CRICOS registration, providers are charged three fees. In the event that institutions no longer are registered to provide a course in the second and third year, they are exempt from the relevant fees. They include:

- $8,676 at time of registration
- $5,784 on the first anniversary of registration
- $2,882 on the second anniversary of registration

=== Annual Registration Charge (ARC) ===
The ARC is a yearly payment compulsory for all CRICOS registered institutions and their courses. Charges include a base fee plus a per enrolment fee for the total number of overseas students on student visas, plus the course based on location. Under the ESOS Act, all CRICOS providers must pay the ARC by the last business day of February. It is calculated from enrolment data stored in the Provider Registration and International Student Management Systems (PRISMS) and includes a:

- "$1505 base fee* plus
- $10 per student enrolment per calendar year plus
- $115 for each course by location registered on CRICOS plus
- $1156 payable only by a provider whom the Minister has imposed sanctions for non-compliance under section 83 of the ESOS Act in the past 12 months

*Government and non-government schools that did not have any enrolments in the previous year but maintained a registration pay a lesser base fee of $423"

=== Late payment penalty ===
Charges are automatically calculated to a providers ARC payment in the event of late payments. Payments are calculated by:

"Late payment penalty = [ARC payable x 20% x (no. of days after 28.02.2020)] divided by 365"

The relevant minister or delegate has the right to take any necessary action, including suspension, if a CRICOS provider fails to pay the ARC.

=== Reinstatement fee ===
In the event of a provider failing to pay their ARC fees, a reinstatement fee will be issued to have the suspension lifted. The payable fee, as of 2020, is $579.
