= Tintern Grammar =

Location
- Ringwood East, Victoria; Australia; 37°48′56″S 145°15′34″E

Information
- Type: Independent, co-educational
- Motto: Latin: Factis Non Verbis (By deeds not words)
- Denomination: Anglican
- Established: 1877
- Principal: Bradley Fry
- Years offered: P–12
- Gender: Co-educational
- Enrolment: ~890 (2015)
- Colours: Green, navy, maroon, and white
- Affiliation: Eastern Independent Schools of Melbourne
- Website: www.tintern.vic.edu.au

Tintern Grammar (also known as Tintern) is an independent, Anglican day school for girls and boys located in Ringwood East, a suburb of Melbourne, Victoria, Australia.

Established in 1877 by Emma Bartlet Cook, Tintern has a non-selective enrolment policy and currently caters for over 890 students, from ELC through to Year 12, including international students.

Located on one site in Ringwood East, the Early Learning Centre is co-educational, while girls and boys are educated in a parallel learning model in single-sex environments from Prep – Year 9. In Years 10 – 12 boys and girls learn together in co-educational classes.

The school is a member of the Eastern Independent Schools of Melbourne (EISM), the Junior School Heads Association of Australia (JSHAA), the Association of Heads of Independent Schools of Australia (AHISA), Alliance of Girls' Schools Australasia (AGSA) and was a founding member of Girls Sport Victoria (GSV).

== History ==
Tintern was founded in 1877 by Emma Cook. Not satisfied with any of the established schools in Hawthorn, Cook felt she needed to start "an excellent school" for her four youngest daughters and the youngest of her five sons. It was not long before neighbours asked Cook to allow their children to enrol, and as word spread about the achievements of the school, many country families also sent their children to attend.

The Church of England Trust purchased the school in 1918, and what was initially a co-educational school, became a school for girls known as Tintern Church of England Girls' Grammar School. Continued growth led to the need for larger and more modern facilities, and subsequently the school moved to its current campus of just over 50 acres (20 ha), at Ringwood East in 1953. The site had been purchased in June 1946 for £3,113.

In 1999, under the principalship of Sylvia Walton (1982–2005), the school returned to Cook's founding wish of educating the whole family, with the establishment of Tintern's brother school, Southwood, located at Ringwood.

== Campus ==
Tintern Grammar is set on a 20 hectares (49 acres) campus in a semi-rural setting, featuring bushland and landscaped gardens. The school's facilities include a multi-function assembly and performance space, ELC, senior and junior libraries and information centres, science and technology laboratories, computer laboratories, established areas for visual and performing arts, a swimming pool and gymnasium complex and other sporting facilities.

The school also features a farm, called Tinternwood Farm, where students (Year 7-12) are encouraged to take part in a Young Farmers’ Program, in which they enter in agricultural competitions. The farm has been operational since the opening of the Ringwood campus of the school, and has since been very successful in local sheep competitions.

== Curriculum ==
Up until 2021 Tintern Grammar offered the International Baccalaureate (IB), the Victorian Certificate of Education (VCE) and Vocational Education and Training (VET).
However, from 2021 onwards Tintern Grammar only offers the VCE and VET.

== House system ==
Tintern has a house system adopted in 1924 and modelled on great English Public Schools.
When Tintern Girls and Southwood Boys combined their houses did too. The Tintern Grammar houses are Butterss-Cross (after Agnes Cross, Headmistress 1911–1918), Gordon-Grant (after three former head prefects, all sisters), Mansfield-Mckie (after founder and first principal Emma Cook, whose maiden name was Mansfield), Somner-Stewart (after three sisters, two of whom were staff members) and Dann-Watt, after ex-student and Olympic Gold medal winning cyclist Kathy Watt.

== Sport ==
Tintern is a member of the Eastern Independent Schools of Melbourne (EISM).

=== EISM Premierships ===
Tintern has won the following EISM senior premierships.

Combined:

- Swimming (5) – 2004, 2005, 2006, 2007, 2008

Boys:

- Badminton (2) – 2009, 2019
- Hockey – 2009
- Indoor Soccer – 2004
- Swimming (5) – 2004, 2005, 2006, 2007, 2008
- Table Tennis (3) – 2006, 2008, 2017
- Tennis (3) – 2007, 2008, 2009

Girls:

- Athletics – 2006
- Basketball (2) – 2011, 2012
- Hockey (3) – 2010, 2011, 2022
- Indoor Cricket (4) – 2015, 2017, 2018, 2020
- Netball (3) – 2012, 2013, 2017
- Swimming (4) – 2004, 2005, 2007, 2010
- Tennis (4) – 2010, 2011, 2013, 2015
- Volleyball – 2022

== Notable alumni ==
Alumnae of Tintern Grammar are known as 'Old Girls' or 'Old Boys' and automatically become members of the schools alumni association, the Tintern Old Girls Association (TOGA) or the Southwood Old Boys Association (SOBA). Some notable past students include:

- Jo Bailey – Sale of the Century co-presenter
- Fifi Box – comedian and radio broadcaster
- Kimberley Chen – Taiwanese celebrity, singer and model
- Elizabeth Eggleston – author and lawyer
- Jacqueline Felgate – journalist
- Joan Gardner – microbiologist
- Louise Hearman – artist
- Scotty James – Olympic snow boarding bronze medallist, 2018 PyeongChang Winter Olympic Games
- Judy Maddigan – member for the seat of Essendon representing the ALP
- Bridget McKenzie – politician
- Hilary McPhee – vice-chancellor's fellow University of Melbourne and former publisher
- Celia Pacquola – comedian
- Helen Quinn – Australian-American theoretical physicist and educator, an Honorary Officer of the Order of Australia. (Her name was Helen Arnold when she graduated from Tintern Church of England Girls' Grammar School in 1959.)
- Helen Reddy – singer-songwriter and actress
- Phyllis Rountree (1911–1994) – bacteriologist
- Penelope Thwaites – concert pianist and composer
- Tafaoimalo Leilani Tuala-Warren – Samoan judge
- Kathy Watt – gold medallist cyclist at the 1992 Barcelona Olympics in the road race

== Notable staff ==
- Elizabeth Couchman
- Thelma Eileen Jarrett
- Sylvia Walton

== See also ==
- List of schools in Victoria
