= Emmaus College, Melbourne =

School in Victoria, Australia

Emmaus College
- Vermont South and Burwood, Melbourne, Victoria

Information
- Type: Independent comprehensive co-educational secondary day school
- Motto: To Know Christ
- Denomination: Catholic Church
- Established: 1980; 46 years ago
- Principal: Karen Jebb
- Years offered: K-12
- Gender: Co-educational
- Enrolment: 1,392
- Houses: Chavoin; Colin; More; Rice
- Colours: Blue and yellow
- Affiliations: Eastern Independent Schools of Melbourne
- Website: www.emmaus.vic.edu.au

Emmaus College is an independent Roman Catholic comprehensive co-educational secondary day school, that serves the eastern suburbs of Melbourne, Victoria, Australia. The school has a Main Campus (years 7, 8, 10, 11 and 12) in Vermont South and a Year 9 campus in Burwood. It has a population of approximately 1,400 students. Emmaus College is a member of the Eastern Independent Schools of Melbourne having joined in 1989. Emmaus was used as external shots for Erinsborough High in Neighbours.

== History ==
=== Merger ===
Emmaus College was established in February 1980 through the merger of Chavoin College in Burwood (established by the Marist Sisters in 1966) with St Thomas More's Boys College in Vermont South (established by the Christian Brothers in 1968). From 1980 until 2011, Year 11–12 students were located at the Burwood Campus (with the girls who began at Chavoin College from 1977-1979 staying on the Burwood Campus) and Year 7–10 students at the Vermont South Campus. In 2012, Year 9 relocated to Burwood with a dedicated campus and Y9@E Program. All other year levels are now at Vermont South. Since its beginnings, Emmaus College has had students from Knox, Whitehorse, Yarra, Boroondara and Monash Council areas.

=== Expansion Plans ===
Emmaus College, St Timothy’s Primary School and Holy Saviour Parish Primary School, all in the suburb of Vermont South, have been in talks to merge. Melbourne Archdiocese Catholic Schools director of learning and regional services Dr Mary Oski said news of the merger has been “overwhelmingly positive”. “We are excited to share that we are actively exploring the potential for a K-12 Catholic Education Hub in Vermont and Vermont South. This innovative concept would offer a seamless K-12 Catholic education for children and families currently attending St Timothy’s Primary School, Holy Saviour Parish Primary School and Emmaus Secondary College.” Oski said. Emmaus College principal Karen Jebb said: “We are excited about the prospect of offering a seamless K-12 educational journey for local families.” There are currently 50 pupils enrolled at St Timothy’s Primary School, 1392 pupils at Emmaus College and 75 from Holy Saviour. The school campuses are within a two-kilometre triangle. It was not known in 2023, how the campuses would be split, or whether all three would be retained, with the plan aiming to go ahead in 2025. In 2024 the plan for the future use of all campuses was unveiled. The previous Holy Saviour Parish Primary School became the junior campus in 2025. Starting in 2026, the year 9 campus now resides at the previous St. Timothy's Primary School, moving away from the Burwood campus. In 2027, the Burwood campus will become a Trade and Training Program for senior students.

== Academics ==
Emmaus College VCE results
Year	Rank	% of scores 40+	Median study score	Cohort size
2012	129	9.2	31	229
2013	153	7.3	31	256
2014	161	5.2	31	275
2015	138	8.0	31	281
2016	153	7.0	31	291
2017	182	6.1	30	289
2018	142	7.2	31	303
2019	122	9.3	31	303
2020	138	7.2	31	291
2021	174	7.7	30	297
2022	196	5.5	30	303
2023	191	6.1	30	296
2024	114	9.8	31	308
2025	100	9.1	32	330

== Extracurricular activities ==
Musicals
Year	Show
2003	Food For Thought
2004	A Funny Thing Happened On The Way To The Forum
2005	Hot Mikado
2006	Footloose
2007	High School Musical
2008	Seussical
2009	The Wiz
2010	Grease
2011	Joseph and the Amazing Technicolour Dreamcoat
2012	Fame
2013	Oliver!
2014	Anything Goes
2015	Hairspray
2016	Beauty and the Beast
2017	The Little Mermaid
2018	Seussical
2019	The Addams Family
2021	Legally Blonde
2022	Anastasia
2023	Little Women
2024	Funny Girl
2025	Rodgers and Hammerstein's Cinderella
2026	Tarzan

=== Sport ===
Emmaus College is a member of the Eastern Independent Schools of Melbourne (EISM), and has been since the amalgamation. Chavoin College and St Thomas More College were both members of EISM.

==== EISM premierships ====
Emmaus College has won the following EISM senior premierships.

Premierships won prior to 1980 were done so by the pre-amalgamation schools Chavoin College and St Thomas More College.

Combined:

- Athletics – 1982

Boys:

- Athletics (3) – 1966, 1971, 1973
- Badminton – 2017
- Basketball – 2020
- Cross Country (6) – 1970, 1971, 1972, 1973, 1974, 1975
- Football – 2024
- Hockey (4) – 2015, 2017, 2018, 2021, 2022
- Soccer (4) – 2015, 2017, 2018, 2019, 2022
- Soccer five-a-side (2) – 2016, 2021
- Softball – 2018
- Swimming (3) – 1973, 1974, 1975
- Tennis (2) – 2017, 2021

Girls:

- Basketball (3) – 1981, 2016, 2020, 2022
- Cricket Super 8 – 2021, 2022
- Football – 2019
- Hockey (2) – 2012, 2013
- Indoor cricket (2) – 2019, 2020
- Netball – 1978, 2022
- Soccer – 2018
- Soccer five-a-side – 2021
- Softball – 2020, 2022
- Tennis (3) – 1977, 2018, 2019

Emmaus Year 9 EISM Premierships

Year 9 Boys:

- Basketball (2) – 2021, 2022
- Football – 2011
- Indoor Cricket – 2011
- Indoor Soccer – 2011
- Soccer – 2011
- Table Tennis – 2010

Year 9 Girls:

- Badminton – 2011
- Basketball (2) – 2021, 2022
- Cricket – 2022
- Netball – 2022
- Soccer – 2011, 2023

== Houses ==
Emmaus College is divided into four houses each bearing the last name of a notable figure in the History of the Catholic Church.

- Chavoin House is named after Chavoin College (1967–1979), the school on the Burwood site prior to Emmaus College. This school was named after Jeanne-Marie Chavoin, foundress of the Marist Sisters.
- Colin House is named after Jean-Claude Colin, the founder of the Marist Fathers.
- More House is named in recognition of St. Thomas More College (1968–1979) which was the original school on the Vermont South (formerly Forest Hill) site, run by the Christian Brothers. The school was named after Thomas More (1478–1535), a legendary figure in English history.
- Rice House is named after Edmund Rice (1762–1844) founder of the Christian Brothers.

The fours house are:

- Chavoin (Red)
- Colin (Blue)
- More (Yellow)
- Rice (Green)

== Notable alumni ==
- Tara Bohanna – AFLW footballer, Gold Coast Suns
- Scott Edwards – cricketer
- Tess Flintoff – cricketer, Melbourne Stars
- Natalie Gauci – musician
- Catherine King – federal MP and government minister
- Ryan Moloney – actor
- Louise Milligan- journalist
- Tony Robinson – politician, elected as the state member for Mitcham 1997–2010 and a Minister in the Brumby Government
- Dylan Williams – AFL footballer, Port Adelaide
- Gabrielle Williams – politician, elected as state member for Dandenong in 2014
