= National Security Advisory Council =

The National Security Advisory Council was a body of external experts which provided advice to the Cabinet of Canada on matters of national security.

== History ==
The NSAC was created by the Martin government as part of the output of the 2004 policy document entitled Securing an Open Society: Canada's National Security Policy.

It was cancelled by the Harper government in October 2012.
