= The Knox School (Australia) =

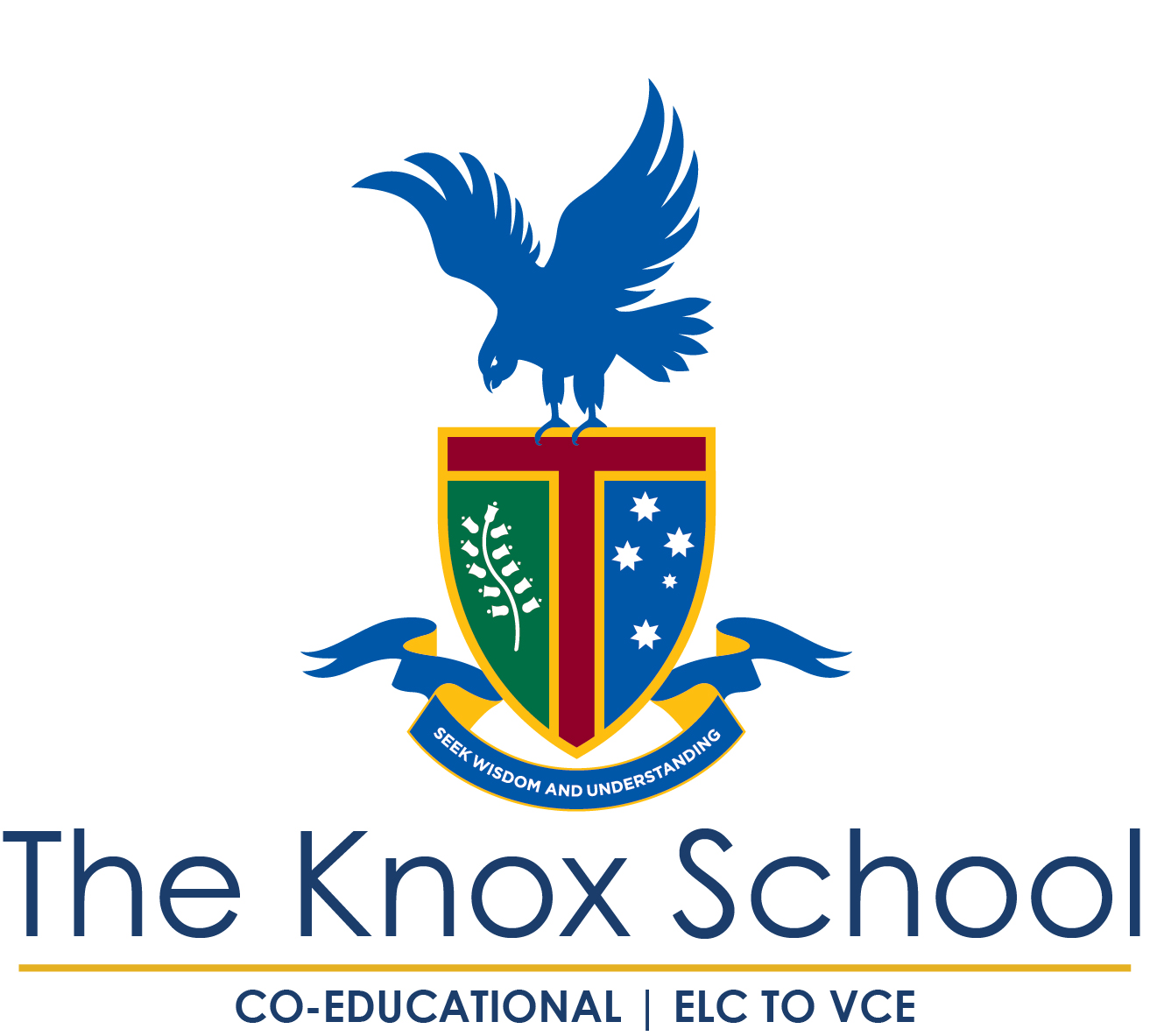

Location
- 220 Burwood Highway; Wantirna South, Victoria 3152; Australia; 37.8647°S 145.2191°E

Information
- Type: Independent, co-educational and day school
- Motto: Seek Wisdom and Understanding
- Established: February 1982
- Principal: Nikki Kirkup
- Years: ELC–12
- Gender: Co-educational
- Enrolment: 820
- Colours: Blue, gold and maroon
- Mascot: Falcon
- Affiliation: Eastern Independent Schools of Melbourne
- Website: www.knox.vic.edu.au

The Knox School is an independent, co-educational, non-denominational day school, located in the eastern Melbourne suburb of Wantirna South, Victoria, Australia. The school is a member of the Eastern Independent Schools of Melbourne association.

== History ==
The Knox School was founded as Knoxfield College in February 1982. The school took over the campus from Taylors College at 220 Burwood Highway. The first principal was Dulcie Flinn, who was previously of the Presbyterian Ladies' College, Melbourne. From 1982 to 1985 there were eight portable classrooms – five for the Junior School and three for the Senior School. In 1985 Stage II building work was done.

The second principal was Baxter Holly. Under Holly's leadership, Knoxfield College developed Stage III, including the Performing Arts Centre and the Art Gallery. 1987 saw the first Year 12 class. 1992 saw the purchase of a 1.6-hectare (4.0-acre) block of land adjoining the school from a plant nursery. That area is now the Tew Field (named after Wally Tew, a local councillor), the school's synthetic hockey pitch. This was opened in 1996. The third principal was Tony Conabere. He was appointed in July 1995. 1996 was another year of building, including the Pre-Prep campus and Tew Field, as well as the adjoining Pavilion.

In 1998 and 2000, the Knox School was ranked in Victoria's top ten schools, and in 1998 won the gold medal for Assessment Practice. 2000 saw the renaming of the school to Knox Grammar, however only a year later the school was further renamed to The Knox School after a "disagreement" with Knox Grammar School over the naming.

In 2002, the Information Common was opened by the then-Governor of Victoria, John Landy. This building incorporates four stories which include a library, many computer facilities, multimedia studio and numerous staff offices and front desk.

In 2004, the fourth principal, Suzanne McChesney, was appointed. Also in that year the Philip Island Discovery Campus was purchased. In 2005, the Junior School Building was named the D. G. M. Flinn building after the School's first principal. 2006 saw the renaming of the Arts Centre to the Founders' Building, in honour of those who started the school.

In 2007 The Knox School celebrated its 25th anniversary, along with unofficially opening its new auditorium, and beginning renovations to part of the Senior School, with renovations to the science labs and the conversion of the Year 12 Common Room into a hospitality kitchen, where students study the elective subject Food Technology and also serves as a small café for the staff. The school also contributed to the building of a crossing over Burwood Highway.

The school developed sister school relationships with the Shonan Gauken school in Fujisawa, Kanagawa, Japan; The Nanjing Foreign Language School in Nanjing, China and Yio Chu Kang Secondary School in Singapore.

The current Principal, Nikki Kirkup, took up the position on 2022.

In February 2016, a $1.5 million refurbishment of the Year 7 Centre was completed. Significant building projects since 2014 have seen many classrooms and other rooms refurbished and a 30 Million Dollar building masterplan (2017–2027) was ratified in 2016.

== House system ==
The four Houses used for sporting and arts competitions and carnivals are "Chisholm" (named after Caroline Chisholm), "Flinders" (Matthew Flinders), "Lawrence" (Marjorie Lawrence) and "Paterson" (Banjo Paterson).

== Schools ==
There are two sub-schools: The Junior School (Early Learning Centre, Prep to Year 6), Senior School (Years 7 to 12).

== Extracurricular activities ==
=== Sport ===
The Knox School is a member of the Eastern Independent Schools of Melbourne (EISM).

==== EISM premierships ====
The Knox School has won the following EISM senior premierships.

Boys:

- Basketball – 2020
- Cricket (3) – 2007, 2013, 2018
- Football (3) – 1999, 2000, 2006
- Hockey (2) – 2006, 2013
- Soccer – 2015
- Table Tennis (2) – 2006, 2016
- Tennis (3) – 2007, 2008, 2020

Girls:

- Basketball (10) – 1999, 2004, 2005, 2006, 2008, 2009, 2010, 2011, 2018, 2019
- Hockey – 2019
- Netball (8) – 1999, 2000, 2001, 2003, 2004, 2005, 2012, 2013
- Soccer (5) – 1999, 2000, 2003, 2009, 2014
- Softball (5) – 2001, 2002, 2003, 2014, 2020
- Tennis (2) – 2010, 2011

== Notable alumni ==
- Jackson Irvine, professional footballer who currently plays and captains German side FC St Pauli and represents the Socceroos

== See also ==
- List of schools in Victoria
