= List of high schools in Victoria =

This is a list of high schools, also known as secondary colleges, in the state of Victoria, Australia. The list includes government, private, independent and Catholic schools.

== A ==
- Academy of Mary Immaculate
- Aitken College
- Alamanda College
- Albert Park College
- Alexandra Secondary College
- Alia College
- Alice Miller School
- Alkira Secondary College
- Alphington Grammar School
- Altona Secondary College
- Antonine College
- Apollo Bay College
- Aquinas College
- Ararat Community College
- Ashwood High School
- Assumption College, Kilmore
- Auburn High School
- Australian International Academy
- Ave Maria College, Melbourne
- Avila College

== B ==
- Bacchus Marsh College
- Bacchus Marsh Grammar School
- Baimbridge College
- Bairnsdale Christian Community School
- Bairnsdale Secondary College
- Ballarat Christian College
- Ballarat Clarendon College
- Ballarat Grammar School
- Ballarat High School
- Ballarat Secondary College
- Balwyn High School
- Bannockburn P-11 Collage
- Bayside Christian College
- Bayside College
- Bayswater Secondary College
- Bayview College
- Beaconhills College
- Beaufort Secondary College
- Beechworth Secondary College
- Belgrave Heights Christian School
- Bellarine Secondary College
- Belmont High School, Geelong
- Benalla College
- Bendigo Senior Secondary College
- Bendigo South East College
- Bentleigh Secondary College
- Berengarra School
- Berwick Grammar School
- Berwick Secondary College
- Beth Rivkah Ladies College
- Bialik College
- Billanook College
- Bindjiroo Yaluk Community School
- Birchip School
- Blackburn High School
- Bogong Outdoor Education Centre
- Boort Secondary College
- Boronia Heights College
- Box Hill High School
- Box Hill Senior Secondary College
- Braemar College
- Brauer College Warrnambool
- Braybrook College
- Brentwood Secondary College
- Bright College
- Brighton Grammar School
- Brighton Secondary College
- Broadford Secondary College
- Brookside College
- Brunswick Secondary College
- Buckley Park College
- Bundoora Secondary College

== C ==
- Camberwell Girls Grammar School
- Camberwell Grammar School
- Camberwell High School
- Camperdown College
- Cann River College
- Canterbury Girls' Secondary College
- Carey Baptist Grammar School
- Caroline Chisholm Catholic College
- Carranballac College
- Carrum Downs Secondary College
- Carwatha College, Melbourne
- Casey Grammar School
- Casterton Secondary College
- Castlemaine Secondary College
- Cathedral College Wangaratta
- Catherine McAuley College
- Catholic College (Sale)
- Catholic College Wodonga
- Catholic Ladies' College
- Catholic Regional College (Caroline Springs)
- Catholic Regional College (Melton)
- Catholic Regional College (North Keilor)
- Catholic Regional College (St Albans)
- Catholic Regional College (Sydenham)
- Caulfield Grammar School
- Chaffey Secondary College
- Chairo Christian School
- Charles La Trobe College
- Charlton College
- Cheltenham Secondary College
- Christian College, Geelong
- Clonard College
- Cobden Technical School
- Cobram Anglican Grammar School
- Cobram Secondary College
- Coburg High School
- Cohuna Secondary College
- Colac College
- Collingwood College
- Copperfield College
- Cornish College
- Corryong College
- Covenant College, Geelong
- Craigieburn Secondary College
- Cranbourne East Secondary College
- Cranbourne Secondary College
- Creek Street Christian College
- Creekside College
- Crusoe Secondary College

== D ==
- Damascus College
- Dandenong High School
- Darul Ulum College
- Daylesford Secondary College
- De La Salle College (Australia)
- Derrinallum College
- Diamond Valley College
- Dimboola Memorial Secondary College
- Donald High School
- Doncaster Secondary College
- Donvale Christian College
- Doveton College
- Dromana College
- Drouin Secondary College

== E ==
- Eaglehawk Secondary College
- East Doncaster Secondary College
- East Loddon College
- East Preston Islamic College
- Echuca College
- Edenhope College
- Edgars Creek Secondary College
- Edinburgh College (Lilydale, Victoria)
- Elisabeth Murdoch College
- Eltham College
- Eltham High School
- Elwood College
- Emerald Secondary College
- Emmanuel College: Notre Dame Campus
- Emmanuel College: St. Paul's Campus
- Emmanuel College, Warrnambool
- Emmaus College
- Epping Secondary College
- Essendon Keilor College
- Euroa Secondary College

== F ==
- Fairhills High School
- FCJ College Benalla
- Featherbrook College
- Fintona Girls' School
- Firbank Girls' Grammar School
- Fitzroy High School
- Flinders Christian Community College
- Footscray City College
- Forest Hill College
- Foster Secondary College
- Fountain Gate Secondary College
- Frankston High School

== G ==
- Galen Catholic College
- The Geelong College
- Geelong Baptist College
- Geelong Grammar School
- Geelong High School
- Geelong Lutheran College
- Genazzano FCJ College
- Gilmore College for Girls
- Gilson College
- Gippsland Grammar School
- Girton Grammar School
- Gisborne Secondary College
- Gladstone Park Secondary College
- Glen Eira College
- Glen Waverley Secondary College
- Gleneagles Secondary College
- Good Shepherd College
- Goroke College
- Goulburn Valley Grammar School
- The Grange College
- Greater Shepparton Secondary College
- Greensborough College
- Grovedale College

== H ==
- Haileybury College, Melbourne
- Hamilton and Alexandra College
- Hampton Park Secondary College
- Hawkesdale College
- Hazel Glen College
- Healesville High School
- Heathdale Christian College
- Heatherton Christian College
- Heathmont College
- Henderson College
- Heritage College
- Heywood and District Secondary College
- Highvale Secondary College
- Highview College
- Hillcrest Christian College
- Hopetoun College
- Hoppers Crossing Secondary College
- Horsham College
- Hume Central Secondary College
- Huntingtower School

== I ==
- Ilim College of Australia
- Irymple Secondary College
- The Islamic Schools Of Victoria
- Ivanhoe Girls' Grammar School
- Ivanhoe Grammar School

== J ==
- John Fawkner College
- John Monash Science School
- John Paul College

== K ==
- Kambrya College
- Kaniva College
- Kardinia International College
- Karingal Park Secondary College
- Keilor Downs College
- Kensington Community High School
- Kerang Technical High School
- Kew High School
- Keysborough Secondary College
- Kilbreda College
- Killester College
- Kilmore International School
- Kilvington Grammar School
- The King David School
- King's College, Warrnambool
- Kingswood College
- The Knox School
- Kolbe Catholic College, Greenvale
- Koo Wee Rup Secondary College
- Koonung Secondary College
- Korowa Anglican Girls' School
- Korumburra Secondary College
- Kurnai College
- Kurunjang Secondary College
- Kyabram P–12 College
- Kyneton Secondary College

== L ==
- Lake Bolac College
- The Lakes South Morang College
- Lakes Entrance Secondary College
- Lakeside Lutheran College
- Lalor North Secondary College
- Lalor Secondary College
- Lara Secondary College
- Lauriston Girls' School
- Lavalla Catholic College
- Lavers Hill College
- Laverton College
- Leibler Yavneh College
- Leongatha Secondary College
- Lighthouse Christian College
- Lilydale Heights College
- Lilydale High School
- Little Yarra Steiner School
- Loreto College, Ballarat
- Loreto Mandeville Hall
- Lorne P-12 College
- Lowanna Secondary College
- Lowther Hall Anglican Grammar School
- Loyola College, Melbourne
- Luther College (Victoria)
- Lyndale Secondary College
- Lyndhurst Secondary College

== M ==
- Mackillop Catholic Regional College
- Mackillop College
- Macleod College
- Mac.Robertson Girls' High School
- Maffra Secondary College
- Mallacoota College
- Manangatang College
- Manor Lakes College
- Mansfield Secondary College
- Maranatha Christian School
- Marcellin College
- Marian College (Ararat)
- Marian College (Myrtleford)
- Marian College (Sunshine West)
- Maribyrnong College
- Marist-Sion College
- Maroondah Secondary College
- Mary MacKillop Catholic Regional College
- Maryborough Education Centre
- Marymede Catholic College
- Mater Christi College
- Matthew Flinders Girls' Secondary College
- Mazenod College
- McGuire College
- McClelland College
- McKinnon Secondary College
- Melbourne Girls' College
- Melbourne Girls' Grammar School
- Melbourne Grammar School
- Melbourne High School
- Melbourne Rudolf Steiner School
- Melton Christian College
- Melton Secondary College
- Mentone Girls' Grammar School
- Mentone Girls' Secondary College
- Mentone Grammar School
- Merbein College
- Mercy Diocesan College
- Mercy Regional College
- The Meridian International School
- Mernda Central College
- Methodist Ladies' College
- Mickleham Secondary College
- Mildura Baptist College
- Mildura Senior College
- Mill Park Secondary College
- Minaret College
- Mirboo North Secondary College
- Monash Secondary College
- Monbulk College
- Monivae College
- Monterey Secondary College
- Montmorency Secondary College
- Mooroolbark College
- Mooroopna Secondary College
- Mordialloc Secondary College
- Mornington Secondary College
- Mortlake College
- Mount Alexander College
- Mount Beauty Secondary College
- Mount Carmel Christian College
- Mount Clear College
- Mount Eliza Secondary College
- Mount Erin College
- Mount Evelyn Christian School
- Mount Hira College
- Mount Lilydale Mercy College
- Mount Ridley College
- Mount Rowan Secondary College
- Mount Scopus Memorial College
- Mount St Joseph Girls' College
- Mount Waverley Secondary College
- Mountain District Christian School
- Mowbray at Brookside
- Mowbray College
- Mullauna College
- Murrayville Community College
- Murtoa College
- Myrtleford Secondary College

== N ==
- Nagle College
- Narre Warren South College
- Nathalia Secondary College
- Nazareth College, Melbourne
- Neerim District Secondary College
- Newcomb Secondary College
- Newhaven College
- Nhill College
- Niddrie Secondary College
- Noble Park Secondary College
- North Geelong Secondary College
- Northcote High School
- Northern Bay College
- Northern College of the Arts and Technology
- Northside Christians College
- Norwood Secondary College
- Nossal High School
- Notre Dame College, Shepparton
- Numurkah Secondary College
- Nunawading Christian College

== O ==
- Oakleigh Grammar School
- Oberon High School
- Officer Secondary College
- Olivet Christian College
- Orbost Secondary College
- Our Lady of Mercy College
- Our Lady of Sacred Heart College
- Our Lady of Sion College
- Ouyen College
- Overnewton Anglican Community College
- Oxley College
- Ozford College

== P ==
- Padua College, Melbourne
- Pakenham Secondary College
- Parade College
- Parkdale Secondary College
- Pascoe Vale Girls' Secondary College
- Patterson River Secondary College
- Pembroke Secondary College
- The Peninsula School
- Penleigh and Essendon Grammar School
- Penola Catholic College
- Peter Lalor Secondary College
- Phoenix Community College
- Plenty Valley Christian College
- Port Melbourne Secondary College
- Portland Secondary College
- Prahran High School
- Presbyterian Ladies' College, Melbourne
- Preshil, The Margaret Lyttle Memorial School
- Preston High School
- Princes Hill Secondary College
- Pyramid Hill College

== R ==
- Red Cliffs Secondary College
- Reservoir High School
- Richmond High School
- Ringwood Secondary College
- River City Christian College
- Robinvale College
- Rochester Secondary College
- Rosebud Secondary College
- Rosehill Secondary College
- Rowville Secondary College
- Roxburgh College
- Rushworth College
- Rutherglen High School
- Ruyton Girls' School

== S ==
- Sacré Cœur School
- Sacred Heart College Geelong
- Sacred Heart College, Kyneton
- Sacred Heart College (Yarrawonga)
- Sacred Heart Girls' College
- Saint Ignatius College Geelong, formerly Catholic Regional College (Drysdale)
- Sale College
- Salesian College Chadstone
- Salesian College (Rupertswood)
- Saltwater College
- Samaritan Catholic College
- Sandringham College
- Santa Maria College
- Scoresby Secondary College
- Scotch College, Melbourne
- Seymour College
- Shelford Girls Grammar School
- Sherbrooke Community School
- Siena College
- Simonds Catholic College, West Melbourne
- Sirius College
- South Coast Christian College
- South Gippsland Secondary College
- South Oakleigh Secondary College
- Southern Cross Grammar
- Southwood Boys' Grammar School
- Springside West Secondary College
- Springvale Secondary College
- St Albans Secondary College
- St Aloysius' College
- St Andrew's Christian College
- St Anthony's Coptic Orthodox College
- St Arnaud Secondary College
- St Augustine's College Kyabram
- St Bede's College (Mentone)
- St. Bernard's College, Melbourne
- St Brigid's College, Horsham
- St Catherine's School, Toorak
- St. Columba's College, Melbourne
- St Francis Xavier College, Melbourne
- St Helena Secondary College
- St James College
- St John's Greek Orthodox College
- St John's Regional College
- St. Joseph's College, Echuca
- St. Joseph's College, Ferntree Gully
- St. Joseph's College, Geelong
- St. Joseph's College, Melbourne, closed in 2010
- St Joseph's College Mildura
- St. Kevin's College, Toorak
- St Leonard's College
- St Margaret's School
- St Mary of the Angels School
- St Mary's Coptic Orthodox College
- St Mary's College (Melbourne)
- St Mary's College (Seymour)
- St Michael's Grammar School
- St Monica's College
- St Patrick's College, Ballarat
- St Paul's Anglican Grammar School
- St Peter's College, Cranbourne
- St Thomas Aquinas College
- Star of the Sea College
- Staughton College
- Stawell Secondary College
- Stott's College
- Strathcona Baptist Girls' Grammar School
- Strathmore Secondary College
- Sunbury College
- Sunbury Downs Secondary College
- Sunshine College
- Surf Coast Secondary College
- Suzanne Cory High School
- Swan Hill College
- Swifts Creek School
- Swinburne Senior Secondary College
- Sydney Road Community School

== T ==
- Tallangatta Secondary College
- Tarneit College
- Taylors College, Melbourne
- Taylors Lakes Secondary College
- Templestowe College
- Terang College
- Thomas Carr College
- Thomastown Secondary College
- Thornbury High School
- Timboon School
- Tintern Grammar
- Toorak College
- Trafalgar High School
- Traralgon College
- Trinity Anglican College
- Trinity College, Colac
- Trinity Grammar School, Victoria
- Trinity Lutheran College
- Truganina College
- Tyrrell College

== U ==
- University High School, Melbourne
- Upper Yarra Secondary College
- Upwey High School

== V ==
- Vermont Secondary College
- Victoria University Secondary College
- Victorian College for the Deaf
- Victorian College of the Arts Secondary School
- Victorian School of Languages
- Victory Christian College, Bendigo
- Victory Lutheran College, Wodonga
- Viewbank College
- Virtual School Victoria

== W ==
- Walcom Ngarrwa Secondary College
- Wallan Secondary College
- Wanganui Park Secondary College
- Wangaratta High School
- Wantirna College
- Warracknabeal Secondary College
- Warragul Regional College
- Warrandyte High School
- Warrnambool College
- Waverley Christian College
- Wedderburn College
- Weeroona College Bendigo
- Wellington Secondary College
- Werribee Secondary College
- Werrimull College
- Wesley College, Melbourne (Elsternwick, Glen Waverley & St. Kilda Road campuses)
- Westall Secondary College
- Westbourne Grammar School
- Western Heights College
- Western Port Secondary College
- Wheelers Hill Secondary College
- Whitefriars College
- Whittlesea Secondary College
- William Ruthven Secondary College
- Williamstown High School
- Wodonga Middle Years College
- Wodonga Senior Secondary College
- Wonthaggi Secondary College
- Woodleigh School
- Woodmans Hill Secondary College
- Worawa Aboriginal College
- Wurun Senior Campus
- Wycheproof College
- Wyndham Central College

== X ==
- Xavier College

== Y ==
- Yarra Hills Secondary College
- Yarra Valley Grammar School
- Yarram Secondary College
- Yarrawonga Secondary College
- Yea High School
- Yeshivah College
- Yuille Park Community College

== See also ==
- List of schools in Australia
- List of schools in Victoria
- List of high schools in Melbourne
