= St Leonard's College =

St Leonard's College may refer to:

- St Leonard's College, St Andrews
- St Leonard's College (Melbourne)
