= Dimboola (disambiguation) =

Dimboola is a town in Victoria, Australia.

Dimboola may also refer to:

- Dimboola railway station
- Dimboola Memorial Secondary College
- Shire of Dimboola, a local government area of Victoria from 1885 to 1995
- Dimboola (play), a 1969 play by Jack Hibberd
  - Dimboola (1973 film), a 1973 recording of the play
  - Dimboola (1979 film), a 1979 film based on the play
- SS Dimboola, a ship involved in the 1919 Fremantle Wharf riot

== See also ==
- Dimbula, a village in Sri Lanka
