= Murder of Prue Bird =

Disappearance and murder of minor in 1992 Australia

Prue Bird
- Born: 26 March 1978; Glenroy, Victoria, Australia
- Disappeared: 2 February 1992 (aged 13); Glenroy, Victoria, Australia
- Known for: Disappearance

Prudence "Prue" Bird, a 13-year-old teenage girl from Glenroy, Victoria, disappeared in February 1992. Her case involved figures in Melbourne’s crime network and led to a 2012 confession from Leslie Camilleri, who was later convicted of her murder. The case remains significant due to lingering questions, inconsistencies in Camilleri’s confession, and the fact that her body was never recovered.

== Background ==
Prue Bird was raised by her mother and lived in Glenroy, Melbourne, but spent considerable time with her grandmother, Julie Hetzel, who lived in Western Australia. Julie’s partner, Paul Hetzel, had a criminal history and associations with known offenders, including his close friend Maurice Marion, Craig Minogue and Stan Taylor. After Paul Hetzel cooperated with authorities in the 1986 Russell Street bombing investigation, he became a witness against bomber Craig Minogue.

Minogue allegedly issued threats suggesting Bird could be harmed if Hetzel continued cooperating. Marion’s underworld connections and history of sexual violence further complicated the case, leading to speculation about his potential involvement.

Bird’s father died when she was one year old. During visits to her grandmother in Leonora, Western Australia, she came into close contact with Marion who was known as 'Maurie.’

Bird was in close contact as a child with Stan Taylor, a former jailmate of Paul Hetzel’s, who was convicted for his role in the Russell Street Bombing. Her grandmother later revealed a disturbing incident from Bird's childhood during her time with Taylor. At the age of seven, Prue had been handcuffed to a naked boy of her own age in a shower. These traumatic experiences prompted Bird to attend therapy in 1988 for a time. She resumed therapy again in 1991, around the time of her visits to Leonora.

== Prue Bird’s time in Leonora ==
In 1991, Prue Bird spent time living in Leonora, Western Australia, with her grandmother, Julie, her grandmother’s partner Paul Hetzel and Maurice Marion. The group lived in a rented house on Gwalia Street while Hetzel and Julie were renovating a property they had purchased in the area. During this time, Bird attended Leonora District High School.

Concerns were raised about Bird’s well-being while she was living in Leonora. Her therapist reportedly expressed deep concern that Bird might be experiencing sexual abuse there and worried about the potential harm of her staying long-term. Despite these concerns, Bird remained in Leonora for several months before returning to Melbourne later that year. Upon her return, Bird reportedly told her mother that she would not go back, describing Hetzel as “nuts.” Sometime in 1991, Bird also took an overdose of tablets, an incident that has led to her family to question if it was linked to trauma during her time in Leonora or perhaps other childhood trauma.

Hetzel was allegedly furious about Bird’s decision to leave Leonora. According to her mother, Jenny Bird, Hetzel made vulgar and offensive comments about Bird, using highly sexualized and abusive language directed toward the 13-year-old. This behavior, combined with his anger over her departure, has been cited as potentially suspicious, especially given Bird’s disappearance not long afterward.

== Disappearance ==
On February 2, 1992 Prue Bird disappeared from her home in Glenroy. On the day she vanished, Bird left behind an uneaten meal on the table, with the television still on. Her mother, Jenny Bird, described the disappearance as “like carrying a bag of bricks around with you every day of your life.” The last time she spoke to her daughter, Prue had apologized for coming home late and said, “I love you.” Jenny later checked on her sleeping daughter before leaving the house the next morning.

At the time of her disappearance, the female partner of Jenny, who lived in the house, saw Bird in the kitchen preparing lunch and speaking to a teenage boy on the phone. The woman left to pack boxes in the garage but returned to find the front door open, the television on, and Bird gone. Jenny expressed her devastation, stating, “To me, it’s like she’s been taken by aliens. She’s just gone.

== Police investigation ==
The day after her disappearance a junior officer at the Broadmeadows police station identified a critical connection that would linger over the case for decades. The officer recognised Bird’s family ties to the Russell Street bombers, responsible for the 1986 deadly attack on Victoria Police headquarters.

About a week after Bird’s disappearance, her mother, Jenny Bird, reported seeing a white car slowly drive past her house. The man in the passenger seat gave her what she described as a “death stare.” She told police and, months later, was shown photographs by investigators.

Jenny identified the man as Rodney Minogue, the brother of Russell Street bomber Craig Minogue and a known criminal. Despite this identification raising questions about potential foul play, investigators faced challenges in advancing the case. Police protocols required evidence of a crime to proceed, but without action, gathering such evidence remained difficult, creating a catch-22 situation.

In the early stages of the investigation, police focused on eliminating family and friends as potential suspects, in line with standard procedures. The investigation was further complicated by societal biases at the time. Jenny Bird’s partner, Issie, who was home alone with Bird on the day of her disappearance, was scrutinized due to her relationship with Jenny. A senior officer reportedly suggested that child murders were common in lesbian relationships, reflecting prejudices that influenced the investigation. By the time police ruled out Jenny and Issie as suspects, valuable time had been lost, and the trail had gone cold, allowing the real perpetrators to evade justice.

Due to Paul Hetzel’s connections to known criminals, authorities considered the possibility that her disappearance was an act of retaliation. Maurice Marion, who had ties to Hetzel and other offenders, was also investigated as a potential suspect. However, no physical evidence was uncovered, and Bird’s fate remained unresolved. Despite the connections to potential suspects and evidence suggesting foul play, the case was not upgraded to a murder investigation until 1996.

== Handling by the Missing Persons Unit ==
At the time of Bird’s disappearance in 1992, the Missing Persons Bureau was severely under-resourced, functioning primarily as a recording service that maintained a list of names and dates on a computer system. With approximately 3,000 missing persons cases to manage, the bureau lacked the personnel and resources necessary to thoroughly investigate complex cases like Bird’s. Chris Jones, who later became the head of the Missing Persons Unit, stated that the case required a dedicated task force to properly investigate the numerous suspects and possible motives. However, Bird’s case remained under the jurisdiction of the Missing Persons Unit, which left it juggled part-time by a small team.

Despite compelling connections between Bird’s disappearance and the Russell Street bombers—such as the alleged threat made by Craig Minogue against her life—senior officials declined to escalate the case to the Homicide Squad. Bird’s case also involved additional complicating factors, including her association with a convicted pedophile (unknown to her family at the time) and her relationship with a boyfriend whose family was known to police. Jones regularly briefed his superiors on the “caliber of characters” involved and pleaded for more resources, but the case was not upgraded to a homicide investigation until 1996, well after the trail had gone cold. Jones expressed frustration that similar cases were prioritized and solved when handled by the Homicide Squad, but Bird’s case remained sidelined.

Jones also suggested that internal biases within the police force may have influenced the case. He believed that the family’s connection to the Russell Street bombers, combined with prejudice against Bird’s mother, Jenny, and her same-sex relationship, contributed to the lack of urgency in addressing the disappearance. Jenny herself recalled derogatory remarks made about her by senior officials, which she felt further de-prioritized the investigation.

== Conviction of Leslie Camilleri ==
In 2012, Leslie Camilleri, who was already serving a life sentence for the 1997 Bega schoolgirl murders, confessed to killing Prue Bird. His statements were inconsistent, with varying motives and accounts of the events. Camilleri claimed to have acted alone and provided explanations that were deemed implausible. Lead investigator Brent Fisher doubted Camilleri’s confession, suggesting the abduction was organized as a payback for the Hetzels’ testimony against the Russell Street bombers. However, insufficient evidence prevented authorities from proving this theory in court. Justice Elizabeth Curtain dismissed many of Camilleri’s claims as unreliable and added 28 years to his sentence.

Camilleri claimed he killed Bird after she refused to disclose the whereabouts of her father, whom he believed might have sexually abused him. It is likely he was referring to her stepfather, as her biological father had died when she was one year old. According to his account, he became angry during the exchange and strangled Prue in a Melbourne street. During his pre-sentence hearing in the Victorian Supreme Court, it was revealed that Camilleri had told fellow prisoners he suspected Prue’s father (or stepfather) was one of two men who had abused him as a child.

Prosecutors stated that Camilleri also claimed to have killed one of the alleged abusers, whose body was supposedly buried near Prue’s. He further alleged that he could not reveal Prue’s burial site to prevent the discovery of the other man’s remains. Camilleri also reportedly told another prisoner that he had killed three additional people. However, prosecutors disputed Camilleri’s version of events arguing that the murder was premeditated and committed alongside Mark McConville, an associate of the individuals behind the Russell Street Police Headquarters bombing who has since died.

During the trial it was alleged that after being kidnapped, Bird was held in a shed in Ascot Vale by Camilleri and McConville, a notorious criminal in the Melbourne underworld. A witness, referred to as ‘K’ in court, claimed to have been locked in the shed with Bird, who expressed distress and a desire to go home. ‘K’ admitted to warning Bird not to escape, fearing retaliation from McConville. She tried to reassure Bird by saying, “We’ll be alright,” but later acknowledged that this was untrue. The witness also recalled Bird mentioning her aspiration to become a hairdresser, a detail known only to her family. Earlier that day, according to ‘K’, she had overheard Camilleri telling McConville that a girl in Glenroy "has to be bumped off", and "If we don't get rid of her, we're fucked".

It was also alleged during the trial that Bird was killed around the time of Camilleri’s arrest in New South Wales on unrelated charges, which was nine days after her disappearance. Despite Camilleri admitting to the killing, he has refused to disclose the identities of any accomplices or the location of Bird’s remains. While Camilleri’s guilty plea brought some closure, many critical details about the case remain unresolved.

== Other suspects ==
Despite this confession, doubts about the case persist due to the lack of physical evidence and inconsistencies in Camilleri's narrative. Prior to Camilleri’s confession, Maurice Marion and other individuals such as Craig Minogue and Paul Hetzel were investigated.

Minogue’s alleged threat against Prue Bird in connection with the Russell Street bombing case has led to speculation that her disappearance could be linked to her grandmother’s partner’s criminal history and cooperation with authorities. Minogue has denied any involvement.

Marion was a notorious bank robber with a history of sexual violence, including convictions for sexual assault of women, convictions Bird's mother was unaware of. As a close friend of Paul Hetzel he was a suspect due to his close connections to the Bird family. Bird’s mother Jenny later learned that Marion had raped her sister, Bird’s aunt, highlighting the potential risk he posed to others in the family. Marion was seen in the vicinity of her neighborhood, Glenroy, at the time of her kidnapping. He withdrew money from an ATM a week before Bird’s disappearance, proving that he was in the vicinity of the area around the time of her disappearance.

Hetzel emerged as a significant figure in the investigation into Prue Bird’s disappearance. His behavior raised suspicions early on, with reports that he was aggressive and dismissive toward Bird’s family and initially insisted she had run away. It took Hetzel and Julie a week to arrive in Melbourne after Bird’s disappearance.

When they finally arrived, Hetzel and Julie briefly came to see Bird’s mother, Jenny. During this visit, Hetzel acted dismissively and again used highly vulgar and sexualized language when joking that Bird might have been sexually assaulted, before quickly sending Julie away to their rented property in Yarck. Hetzel then stayed for a number of days with Maurice Marion at his residence in Daylesford. Jenny later questioned, ‘What were those criminals doing together?’—a sentiment that continues to fuel debate over Hetzel’s possible involvement. Investigators later considered the possibility of Hetzel’s collaboration with Marion in connection to Bird’s abduction and murder.

Additionally, Jenny Bird recalled Hetzel discouraging her from sharing a photograph of Marion and Bird with the police, ostensibly out of concern that it might implicate Marion. Hetzel also reportedly tried to prevent Jenny from contacting her mother. These actions, along with his proximity to key suspects and the timeline of events, have fueled ongoing debate about his role in the case.

Hetzel and Marion were known to be involved in a racketeering operation centered on counterfeit gold, which involved the use of acids commonly employed in processing gold. A former criminal associate of the pair alleged that Bird had been kidnapped and subsequently murdered by Hetzel and Marion, who dissolved her body in acid to conceal the crime. However, police found no substantial evidence linking Hetzel or Marion to Bird's disappearance.

== Statements by Paul Hetzel ==
Paul Hetzel, step-grandfather to Prue Bird, has acknowledged feelings of guilt over events that may have contributed to her disappearance. Speaking two decades after the crime, Hetzel admitted his associations with the Russell Street bombers placed Bird in harm’s way. He described himself as the “catalyst,” stating, “If I wasn’t involved with those people, she would still be alive today.”

Hetzel reflected on the group’s activities, which included violent armed robberies carried out with his closest associates Stan Taylor and brothers Craig and Rodney Minogue. Despite their extensive criminal behavior, Hetzel claimed the group adhered to an unwritten code of conduct that prohibited harming women or children. He remarked, “I didn’t see a problem with it as we grew up with a code of conduct that you didn’t hurt women or children.”

However, Taylor and Craig Minogue were later implicated in serious crimes against women. In May 2019, Minogue was charged with 38 offences, including abduction by force and aggravated rape, relating to incidents shortly before the Russell Street bombing in 1986. Police alleged that Taylor, who orchestrated the bombing, participated in one of these assaults. These revelations cast doubt on Hetzel’s statement and suggest the group’s supposed “code” was far from upheld in practice.

As previously described, Bird’s grandmother recounted troubling incidents involving Stan Taylor that further challenge the notion of any moral “code of conduct” within Hetzel’s circle. These incidents, coupled with the vulgar and sexualized language Hetzel reportedly used when referring to Bird, paint a starkly different picture of the group’s dynamics. The involvement of Taylor and Minogue in violent crimes, including offenses targeting women, further illustrates the environment of danger and exploitation that surrounded Bird. This context raises serious questions about the level of risk she was exposed to through her association with Hetzel and his network.

Hetzel acknowledged the gang’s intense hatred for police, which escalated to the bombing of the Russell Street Police Headquarters in 1986, an attack designed to cause mass casualties and described as “an act of war.”

During the trial following the bombing, Hetzel and his partner, Julie, alleged that Craig Minogue had directly threatened Bird’s life, warning, “It would be a shame if anything happened to your sweet little Prue.” Hetzel believed the threat was credible and later testified against the bombers, a decision he viewed as a necessary act of self-preservation. Reflecting on the day he faced the bombers in court, Hetzel described it as signing his own “death warrant” due to the gang’s reputation for retaliation.

While Hetzel has maintained that his testimony was critical to prosecuting the bombers, his actions and associations have remained a point of contention in the investigation into Bird’s disappearance. His admission that Bird frequently visited her grandparents’ property, combined with his involvement with dangerous criminals, continues to raise questions about his role in the events leading up to her disappearance.

== Unresolved questions ==
Prue Bird’s body has not been recovered, and unresolved issues surrounding the case, including inconsistencies in Camilleri’s confession and potential other suspects, contribute to ongoing interest. Bird’s mother, Jenny, has expressed lasting bitterness over the handling of the case, despite positive experiences with some individual officers. She believes that if authorities had acted sooner, Bird, who was reportedly held captive for up to a week before being murdered, might have been rescued.

Jenny Bird also expressed frustration that the investigation failed to explore potential links in Leonora, where Bird had spent several months in 1991. Due to Paul Hetzel’s placement in the Witness Protection Program, police avoided drawing attention to the area, which hindered efforts to investigate any leads connected to her time there.

Jenny Bird spoke at Camilleri’s sentencing in 2013, expressing grief and anger over his lack of remorse and the unresolved location of Prue’s remains. Former investigators have since acknowledged that the case was mishandled, with calls for an apology to Jenny Bird for the police department’s failures.

Bird’s mother has continued to seek information and resolution regarding her daughter’s disappearance. She has stated that the case can never be fully closed until her daughter’s remains are found.

== See also ==
- Russell Street bombing
- Bega schoolgirl murders
