= Narre Warren South =

- Suburb
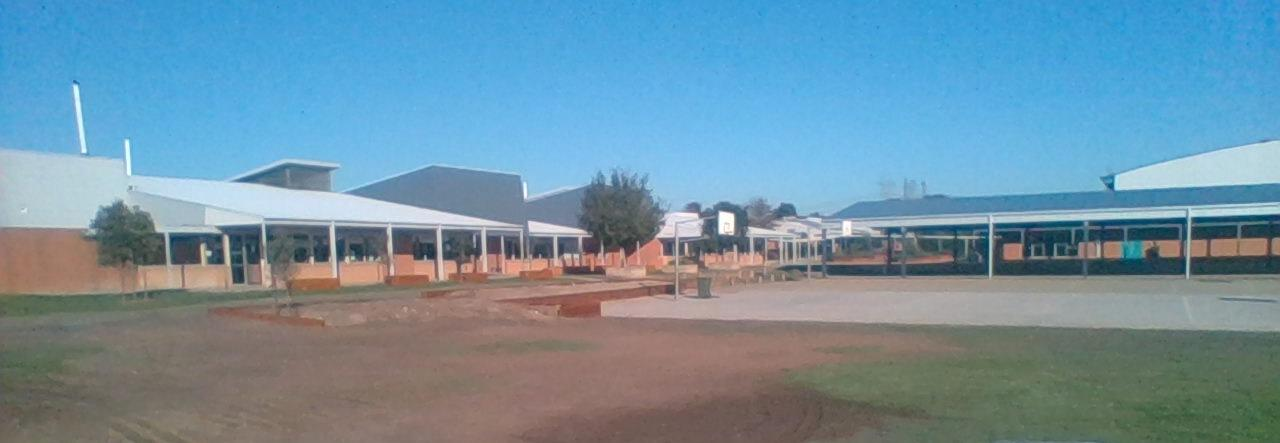
- The basketball courts at Narre Warren South P-12 College

- Interactive map of Narre Warren South
- Coordinates: 38.055°S 145.303°E
- Country: Australia
- State: Victoria
- City: Melbourne
- LGA: City of Casey
- Location: 39 km (24 mi) from Melbourne; 13 km (8.1 mi) from Dandenong

Government
  - State electorate: Narre Warren South
  - Federal division: Holt, Bruce

Area
  - Total: 13.3 km^{2} (5.1 sq mi)
- Elevation: 46 m (151 ft)

Population
  - Total: 30,909 (SAL 2021)
- Postcode: 3805
Suburbs around Narre Warren South
Hallam	Narre Warren	Berwick
Hampton Park	Narre Warren South	Berwick
Lynbrook	Cranbourne North	Clyde North

Narre Warren South is an outer suburb of Melbourne in Victoria, Australia, 39 km south-east of Melbourne's Central Business District, located within the City of Casey local government area. Narre Warren South recorded a population of 30,909 at the 2021 census.

== History ==
Since the mid-1990s, Narre Warren South has become a booming suburb, taking over what was once was a rural area with few farms or rural areas remaining. In the last 10 years, many subdivisions have been developed, including Berwick Springs estate, which was launched in 1999, and Cypress Hill estate/Hillsmeade, which was launched around the same time.

There are now other estates in the area, such as Golden Grove estate, Camden Greens Estate, Berwick Springs and Silverleaf.

== Education ==
Narre Warren South is serviced by Hillsmeade Primary School, a public school, Trinity Catholic Primary School, a co-educational Catholic school, and Strathaird Primary School, which has grown to be one of the top public primary schools in Melbourne.

As of November 2010, ICA Casey, a private school in Narre Warren South, was placed in voluntary administration.

The campus of the former ICA Casey is now occupied by Waverley Christian College.

== Retail ==
Narre Warren South has two shopping centres. Casey Central Shopping Centre, located on Narre Warren-Cranbourne Road, is and has been anchored by a Coles Supermarket, Woolworths Supermarket, Aldi Supermarket and a Target Department Store since March 2016. Amberly Park Shopping Centre on Ormond Road is a smaller centre containing an IGA Supermarket (formerly a FoodWorks Supermarket) and a few specialty stores, located next door to Narre Warren South P-12 College. Also close by in adjoining suburbs are Eden Rise Shopping Centre on the corner of Clyde Road and Greaves Road in Berwick, Eve Central Shopping Centre in Cranbourne North and Springhill Shopping Centre in Cranbourne and Westfield Fountain Gate in Narre Warren.

Due to substantial residential growth in the area, the Springhill shopping complex was constructed. It features a Coles Supermarket, and several businesses including a bakery, pizza restaurant and gym.

== See also ==
- City of Berwick – Narre Warren South was previously within this former local government area.
- Electoral district of Narre Warren South
