= Traralgon College =

Location
- Traralgon, Gippsland, Victoria; Australia
- Coordinates: 38°11′27″S 146°31′10″E

Information
- Type: Government-funded co-educational secondary day school
- Established: 1 January 1993
- Principal: Fiona Milkins
- Enrollment: c. 1,200
- Campuses: East: Junior (Year 7 to Year 8); West: Senior (Year 9 to Year 12)
- Colours: Navy blue, light blue and white

Traralgon College is a dual-campus government-funded co-educational secondary day school, located in Traralgon, Gippsland, Victoria, Australia.

Traralgon College serves 1,200 students with two campuses. The east campus is the Junior Campus (Year 7 to Year 8) and the West Campus (Year 9 to Year 12) is for Senior students. The school serves high school students in the Latrobe Valley, 145 kilometres (90 mi) east of Melbourne, which forms part of Latrobe City, with an area population of 75,000. The school has partnerships with several other universities and colleges locally and overseas.

== History ==
The college lost its camp and some buildings in the East Campus in four fires suffered in 2006.

=== Junior Campus (East Campus) ===
This campus consists of students in the year level 7 to 9 and started to offer the Hands on Learning program in 2009.

=== Senior Campus (West Campus) ===
The West Campus consists of VCE and VCAL in the year levels 10–12.

== See also ==
- List of high schools in Victoria
