= Glenroy, Victoria =

Glenroy
- Suburb
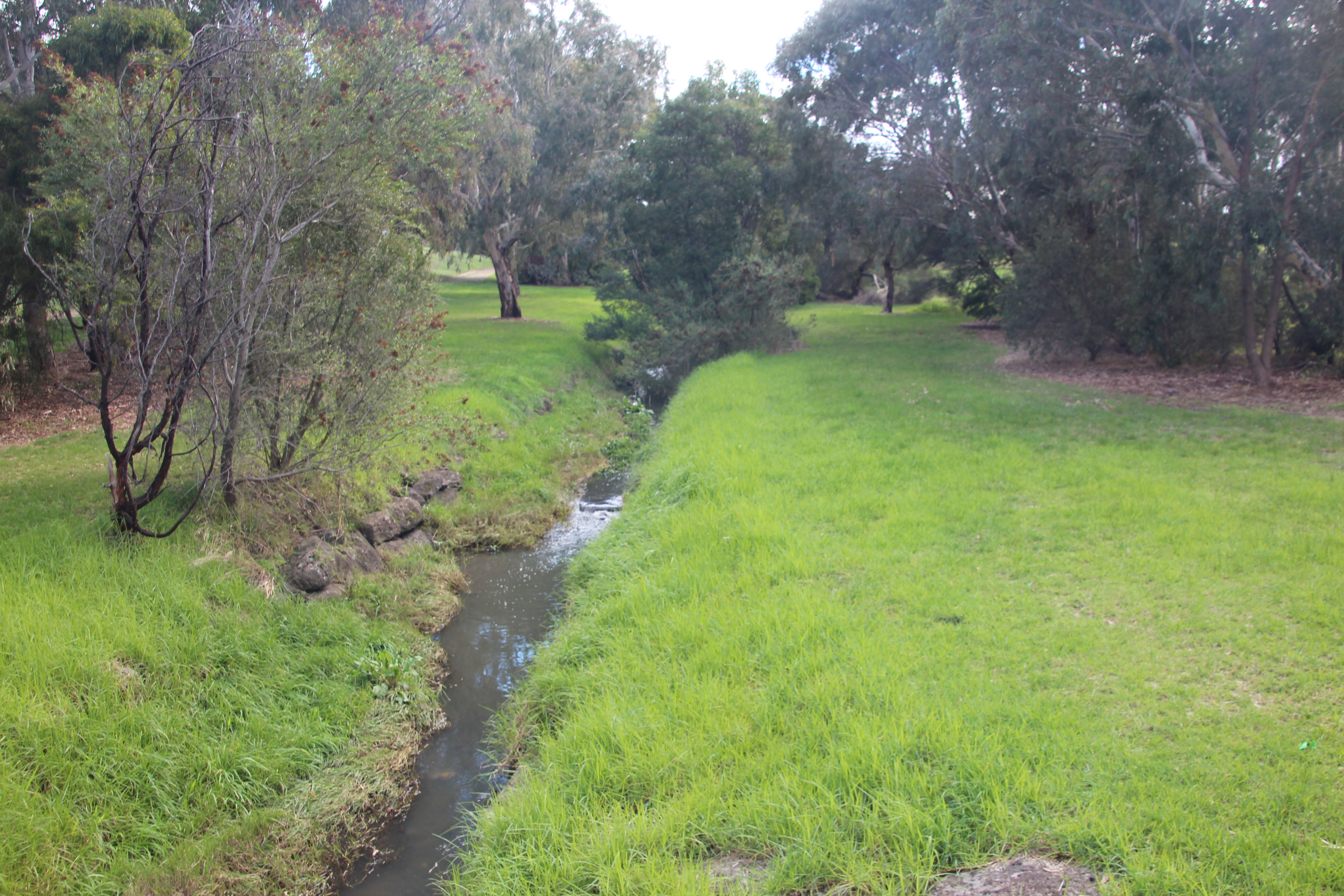
- Merlynston Creek, Glenroy

- Interactive map of Glenroy
- Coordinates: 37.706°S 144.924°E
- Country: Australia
- State: Victoria
- City: Melbourne
- LGA: City of Merri-bek
- Location: 12 km (7.5 mi) N of Melbourne
- Established: 1880s

Government
  - State electorate: Broadmeadows
  - Federal divisions: Wills; Maribyrnong

Area
  - Total: 9.1 km^{2} (3.5 sq mi)
- Elevation: 98 m (322 ft)

Population
  - Total: 23,792 (2021 census)
  - Density: 2,615/km^{2} (6,770/sq mi)
- Postcode: 3046
Suburbs around Glenroy
| Gladstone Park | Broadmeadows; Jacana | Broadmeadows |
| Gowanbrae | Glenroy | Fawkner; Hadfield |
| Oak Park; Strathmore Heights | Oak Park | Pascoe Vale |

Glenroy (/ɡlɛnˈrɔɪ/ glen-ROY) is a suburb in Melbourne, Victoria, Australia, 12 km (7.5 mi) north of Melbourne's Central Business District, located within the City of Merri-bek local government area. Glenroy recorded a population of 23,792 at the 2021 census.

Glenroy is located in the northwest of the City of Merri-bek, and is bounded by the Western Ring Road in the north, the Moonee Ponds Creek in the west, New Road, Victoria Street and Rhodes Parade in the south and West Street, Hilton Street, Box Forest Road and the Upfield railway line in the east.

Prominent features include the private Northern Golf Club, a major retail district centred on the Glenroy railway station and the Northern Memorial Park extension to the Fawkner General Cemetery.

== History ==
The area was originally home to the Wurundjeri people of the Kulin Nation, before British colonisation and settlement of the Melbourne area started in 1835.

The Glenroy Estate bounded by the Moonee Ponds Creek, Camp Road, the Northern Golf Club (inclusively) and Rhodes Parade, was purchased in Sydney in 1838 by speculators Hughes and Hosking. The Camerons may have owned it as part of a Run before survey or just leased it from the speculators, and are credited with giving Glenroy its name. However, Donald Angus Kennedy, who bought the estate in the mid-1840s, bestowed the name according to his 1864 obituary in The Argus. Kennedy's mother was Grace (née Cameron).

Initial development in the area started with a small settlement around the North East railway line at the end of the 19th century, with the Glenroy Post Office opening on 22 October 1888.

After World War II, significant development occurred when organisations such as Australian National Airways, the War Services Homes Commission and the Housing Commission of Victoria developed large areas of Glenroy. Residential development continued rapidly through the 1950s, and a Glenroy East Post Office opened in 1958 (closing in 1977).

On 15 December 1994, when the local government area of the City of Broadmeadows was abolished, suburbs south of the Western Ring Road, including Glenroy, were transferred to the City of Moreland (now City of Merri-bek).

On 25 August 2023, the 136-year-old Glenroy Post Office closed.

=== Heritage listings ===
The following place in Glenroy is listed on the Victorian Heritage Register:

- Gowrie, at 63–65 Gowrie Street

== Demographics ==
In the 2021 census of Australia, there were 23,792 people in Glenroy. 50.8% of people were born in Australia. The next most common countries of birth were Nepal 7.6%, India 5.2, Italy 3.1%, Pakistan 3.0% and Lebanon 2.3%. 41.6% of people spoke only English at home. Other languages spoken at home included Arabic 8.3%, Nepali 7.8%, Italian 4.5%, Urdu 3.8% and Turkish 3.7%. The most common responses for religion were Catholic 23.6%, No Religion 22.5%, Islam 18.7% and Hinduism 10.8%.

=== Historical census data ===
- 1891: 224
- 1921: 545
- 1947: 1,135
- 2001: 18,550
- 2006: 18,870
- 2011: 19,664
- 2016: 22,245

== Education ==
- Ballerrt Murrup College
- Belle Vue Park Primary School
- Corpus Christi Catholic Primary School
- Glenroy Central Primary School
- Glenroy College
- Glenroy Private
- Glenroy Private Islamic School
- Glenroy Specialist School
- Glenroy West Primary School
- Ilim College: Glenroy Campus
- Penola Catholic College: Glenroy Campus (7-8)
- St Thomas More's Primary School

== Transport ==
=== Bus ===
Seven bus routes service Glenroy:

- 513 : Eltham station – Glenroy station via Lower Plenty. Operated by Dysons.
- 514 : Eltham station – Glenroy station via Greensborough. Operated by Dysons.
- 527 : Gowrie station – Northland Shopping Centre via Murray Road. Operated by Ventura Bus Lines.
- 534 : Glenroy station – Coburg via Boundary Road and Sydney Road. Operated by Dysons.
- 536 : Glenroy station – Gowrie station via Gowrie Park. Operated by Dysons.
- 542 : Roxburgh Park station – Pascoe Vale station via Meadow Heights, Broadmeadows and Glenroy. Operated by Dysons.
- Night Bus 951 : Brunswick station – Glenroy station via West Coburg (operates Saturday and Sunday mornings only). Operated by Ventura Bus Lines.

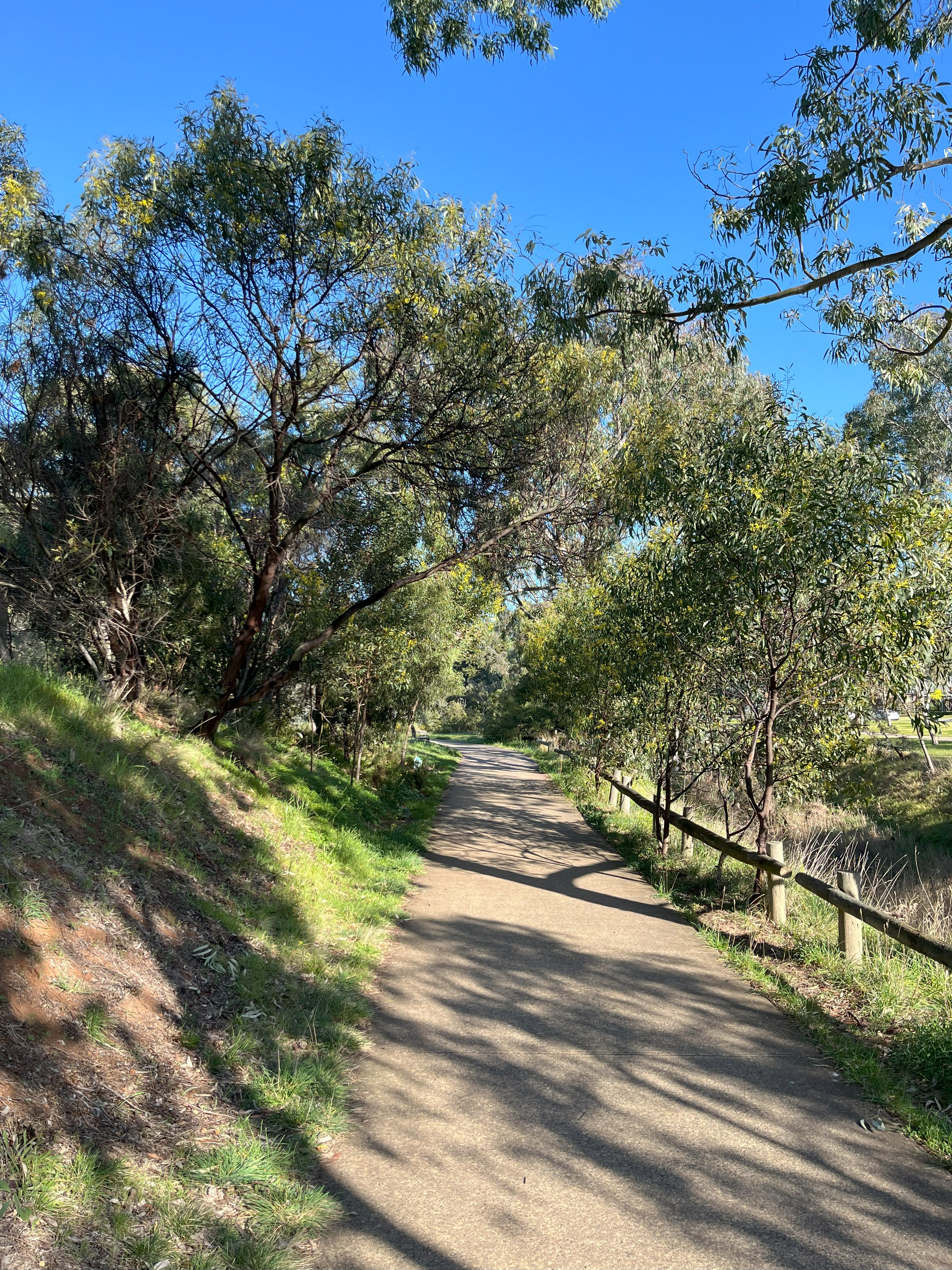
Moonee Ponds Creek Trail, Glenroy

=== Cycling ===
The Moonee Ponds Creek Trail and the Western Ring Road Trail provide facilities for recreational and commuting cyclists.

=== Road ===
Prominent road infrastructure is also provided, with Pascoe Vale Road running through the east of the suburb and the Western Ring Road forming the suburb's northern boundary. Other arterials within the suburb include Daley Street, Glenroy Road, Hilton Street, Plumpton Avenue, and Widford Street.

=== Train ===
Glenroy is served by three railway stations at which Metro Trains operate services to and from the Melbourne CBD. Glenroy and Jacana stations are located on the Craigieburn line in the west of the suburb, whilst Gowrie station is located on the Upfield line, which forms part of the suburb's eastern boundary.

== Sport ==
- Glenroy Football Club, an Australian rules football team, competes in the Essendon District Football League. The club was founded in 1946.
- Golfers play at the course of the Northern Golf Club on Glenroy Road.
- Glenroy is home to The Glenroy Cricket Club, established in 1895, who compete in the Victorian Turf Cricket Association (VTCA). In 2004/05 they merged with the Glenroy Amateur Cricket Club (established 1972). The club shares their home ground with the Glenroy Football Club and is located on the north-east corner of the Northern Golf Club, on Glenroy Road.

== Notable former residents ==
- Bobbie Lewis — jockey
- Prudence "Pure" Bird — murder victim
- The Janoskians — pop music group
- The Crawford family — murder victims

== See also ==
- City of Broadmeadows – Glenroy was previously within this former local government area.
