= Narre Warren South P-12 College =

Narre Warren South P–12 College

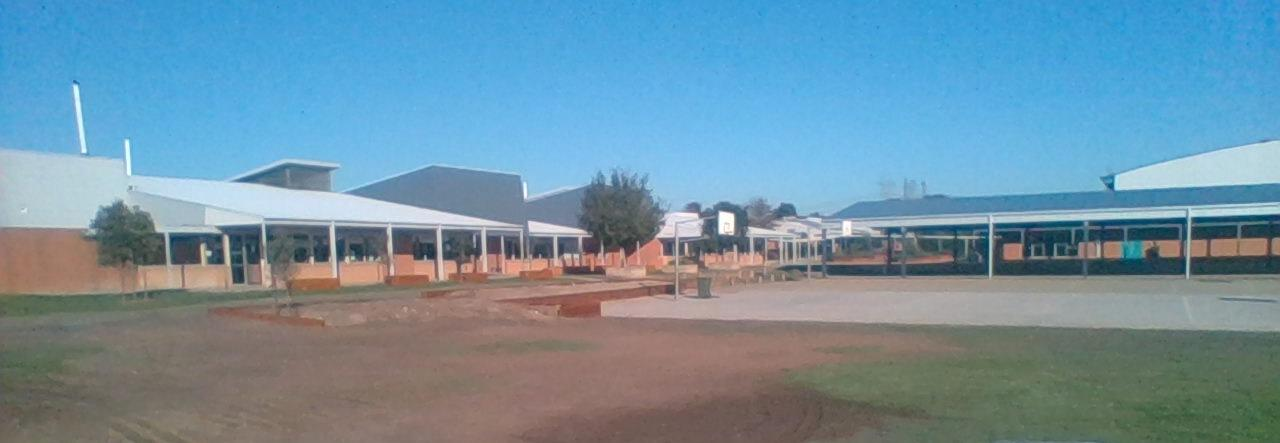
- Basketball courts

Location
- Narre Warren South, Victoria; Victoria, Australia; 38.0498°S 145.2862°E

Information
- Opened: 2002: Prep–7; 2009: Prep–12
- Principal: Lachlan Yeates
- Years offered: Prep–12
- Enrollment: 2550
- Education system: VELS, VCAL, VET and VCE
- Campuses: 1
- Website: www.nwsc.vic.edu.au/..

Narre Warren South College is a school in Narre Warren South, Victoria, Australia. Narre Warren South P–12 College commenced operations in 2002 but was not officially opened until 2007. The prep to year twelve college actually began as a prep to year seven school in 2002 and it was not until 2007 (when it was officially opened) that the college went to year 12.

The college is broken up into two sections, primary years (prep to year 6), secondary years (year 7 to year 12). Each sub-school has a coordinator and a leader's council that deals with the day-to-day workings of each year.

== Principals ==
- 2002–2008 – Ross Miller
- 2008–2014 – Rob Casamento
- 2015–2020 – Rob Duncan
- 2021–2024 – Peter Thatcher
- 2025-2025(June) - Justine Smyth (Acting)
- 2025 (July) - Lachlan Yeates

== Layout ==
The school comprises seven main buildings:

- A-block – Administration, sickbay, library, office and classrooms
- B-block – Food technology, visual art, media, drama, music (Also includes Performing Arts Centre)
- C-block – Later years (Years 10–12) classrooms and later years reception.
- D-block – Science, technology, IT office, engineering, digital technology, year 10 locker bay,
- E-block – School gym including weights room for year 9–12 students, year 9 reception, 8 locker bay.
- F-block – Years 7-8–9 reception (F26) and classrooms, year 7 locker bay.
- G-block – Grades prep–6 classroom and reception.
- There is also small & large soccer pitch’s made of artificial grass.

== See also ==
- Education in Australia
- List of high schools in Victoria
