= Glenroy Specialist School =

Location
- Glenroy; Melbourne, Victoria, 3046; Australia; 37°42′8.89″S 144°57′20.25″E

Information
- School type: Government disability specialist school
- Established: 17 February 1976
- Status: Open
- Authority: Victorian Department of Education and Training
- Principal: Allan Waterson
- Faculty: 83.1 (on an FTE basis)
- Teaching staff: 32.6 (on an FTE basis)
- Age: 5 to 18
- Enrolment: 135 (2020)
- Slogan: Working Together to Achieve
- Accreditation: Victorian Certificate of Applied Learning
- Communities served: North and west Melbourne metropolitan region
- Website: www.glenroyss.vic.edu.au

Glenroy Specialist School (GSS) provides education for students with physical disabilities from prep to year 12 in the northern region of Melbourne, Victoria, Australia.

== History ==
GSS was officially opened on 17 February 1976 in Box Forest Road Glenroy. The school was purpose built on ten acres of land, with three acres being under roof. The building consists of 22 classrooms, two gymnasiums, swimming pool, a large hall, and several areas catering for the physical therapy of the students. During 2011 work started on a new building to house GSS after the student population outgrew the Box Forest site, which had developed significant structural issues. The new school building opened January 2013, and is located on Hilton Street, Glenroy.

== School structure ==
The school is divided into separate sub-schools: junior, middle and senior.

=== Junior school ===
Junior school is made up of Red and Yellow Sections and accommodates students up to the age of approximately eight.

=== Middle school ===
Once students leave the junior sub-school they go to middle school, which is made up of Light Green and Blue sections.

=== Senior school ===
Senior school includes classes for transition, sensory students and also students studying the Victorian Certificate of Applied Learning (VCAL) certificate, and students preparing to enter the VCAL class.

=== VCAL ===
Students aged from 16 to 18 are able to participate in a VCAL program, a hands-on educational certificate for students in years 11 and 12. It allows students to practise personal skills and develop work related skills.

Students complete projects of their choice. Past projects have included Tuck Shops, Pyjama days, performances and a variety of stalls. The VCAL program was introduced at GSS in 2005 when the school won the "Student Team Achievement Award".

== Health services ==
Yooralla provides students at GSS with physiotherapy, occupational therapy and speech pathology. Therapists work with teachers to support students access to their learning.

=== Physiotherapy ===
The physiotherapists help to encourage independence. They provide strength and fitness training modified to suit individual needs and disabilities. Apparatus such as standing frames, splints and arm wraps are used to build bone and muscle strength and stretch muscles. Physiotherapists assist in providing assistive equipment such as wheelchairs, crutches and walking frames.

=== Occupational therapy ===
The occupational therapists assist students in using equipment to gain independence. Some of the equipment used include: hand splints, ankle foot orthotics, mealtime equipment, modified writing equipment, class chairs, hoists, computer access equipment, hand grips, switches, personal care items, scooters, bikes and wheelchairs.

=== Speech pathology ===
Speech pathologists assist students to eat and drink safely, effectively and independently and also train other staff to assist students. Speech pathologists also help students with their speech articulation, literacy and grammar.

Speech pathologists assist students to communicate using equipment such as: communication books, tablets, communication devices, signing, picture communication symbols and switches.
