= Gowrie, Glenroy =

House in Melbourne, Victoria, Australia

Gowrie
- Location within Melbourne
- Former names: Gowrie Park
- Etymology: Gowrie, Perthshire, Scotland

General information
- Status: Completed
- Type: House
- Architectural style: Scottish baronial revival
- Location: 63–65 Gowrie Street, Glenroy, Melbourne, Victoria, Australia
- Coordinates: 37°41′58″S 144°56′41″E
- Completed: 1855; 171 years ago
- Client: James Robertson

Technical details
- Material: Bluestone; slate
- Floor count: 1 (or 2)
- Grounds: 1,500 m^{2} (16,000 sq ft)

Design and construction
- Architecture firm: Cartwright Bros.

Victorian Heritage Register
- Official name: Gowrie
- Type: Registered place
- Designated: 9 October 1974
- Reference no.: H0128
- Heritage overlay no.: HO88
- Category: Residential buildings (private)

Register of the National Estate
- Official name: Gowrie
- Type: Defunct register
- Designated: 21 March 1978
- Reference no.: 5542

Gowrie is a house, located at 63–65 Gowrie Street, in Glenroy, an inner-northern suburb of Melbourne, Australia. Completed in 1855, the house was added to the Victorian Heritage Register on 9 October 1974 in recognition of its historical and architectural significance.

The house was also added to non-statutory lists by the Victorian branch of the National Trust on 29 November 1962, the City of Merri-bek on an unknown date, and the now defunct Register of the National Estate on 21 March 1978.

== History ==
Gowrie at 63–65 Gowrie Street, Glenroy, was erected in 1855 for James Robertson (1808–1888), a Scottish immigrant, on the southern part of a pastoral lease. Robertson and his cousin, (Note: In another source, Gibb is identified as the husband of Robertson's sister-in-law.) Alexander Gibb, acquired the 260-hectare (640-acre) pastoral lease in 1848, and subsequently divided the lease into two homestead runs in c. 1850.

Robertson, his wife, Ann, and the first of their nine children, arrived in the Colony of New South Wales in c. 1842 and, as a blacksmith, Robertson formed a profitable partnership with Gibb, a wheelwright, who arrived at the same time, with his wife, Betsy—the sister of Ann Robertson. Gibb also built a large house on the northern part of the pastoral lease (now Broadmeadows) in c. 1850, initially called "Meadowbank", and later, "Manor House", also listed on the Victorian Heritage Register.

Initially called "Gowrie Park", it is most likely that Robertson, who was born in Perthshire, named the estate in honour of the eponymous Scottish province, Gowrie.

At the time of Robertson's death in 1888, Gowrie Park comprised 330 hectares (820 acres) and probate was granted for a total of £47,601. Robertson bequeathed his eldest son, John, the option of purchasing the farm and homestead for £15,000 and paying his brothers and sisters; and made the same offer to his other sons – James, Alexander, and David – should John decline the offer. In 1897, a parcel containing 230 hectares (560 acres) of the property was listed for sale. (Note: It is unclear if the homestead was included in the parcel listed.)

== Description ==
The one-and-a-half-storey six-bedroom bluestone house is constructed with a slate roof, prominent gable dormers and dressed stonework quoins and copings in the style of Scottish baronial revival farmhouse, designed by Cartwright Bros. Gowrie is one of the oldest surviving houses in the Broadmeadows district and is of architectural importance as a relatively rare and externally intact example of a traditional Scottish laird's house translated into the Australian context.

The building is an early homestead of Robertson and is closely related to the similarly-styled house by Gibb, built in c. 1850, called "Meadowbank" (now "Manor House", in Broadmeadows) located on the northern section of the pastoral lease.

Gowrie was extensively renovated internally and the original outbuildings and stables demolished to facilitate the erection of flats adjoining the rear of the house. The exterior is essentially in original condition, complete with '1855' foundation stone.

The house and surrounding 1,500 square metres (16,000 sq ft) of gardens was sold in December 2009 for c. $687,000.

== See also ==
- Architecture of Melbourne
- List of places on the Victorian Heritage Register in the City of Merri-bek
