= Glen Eira College =

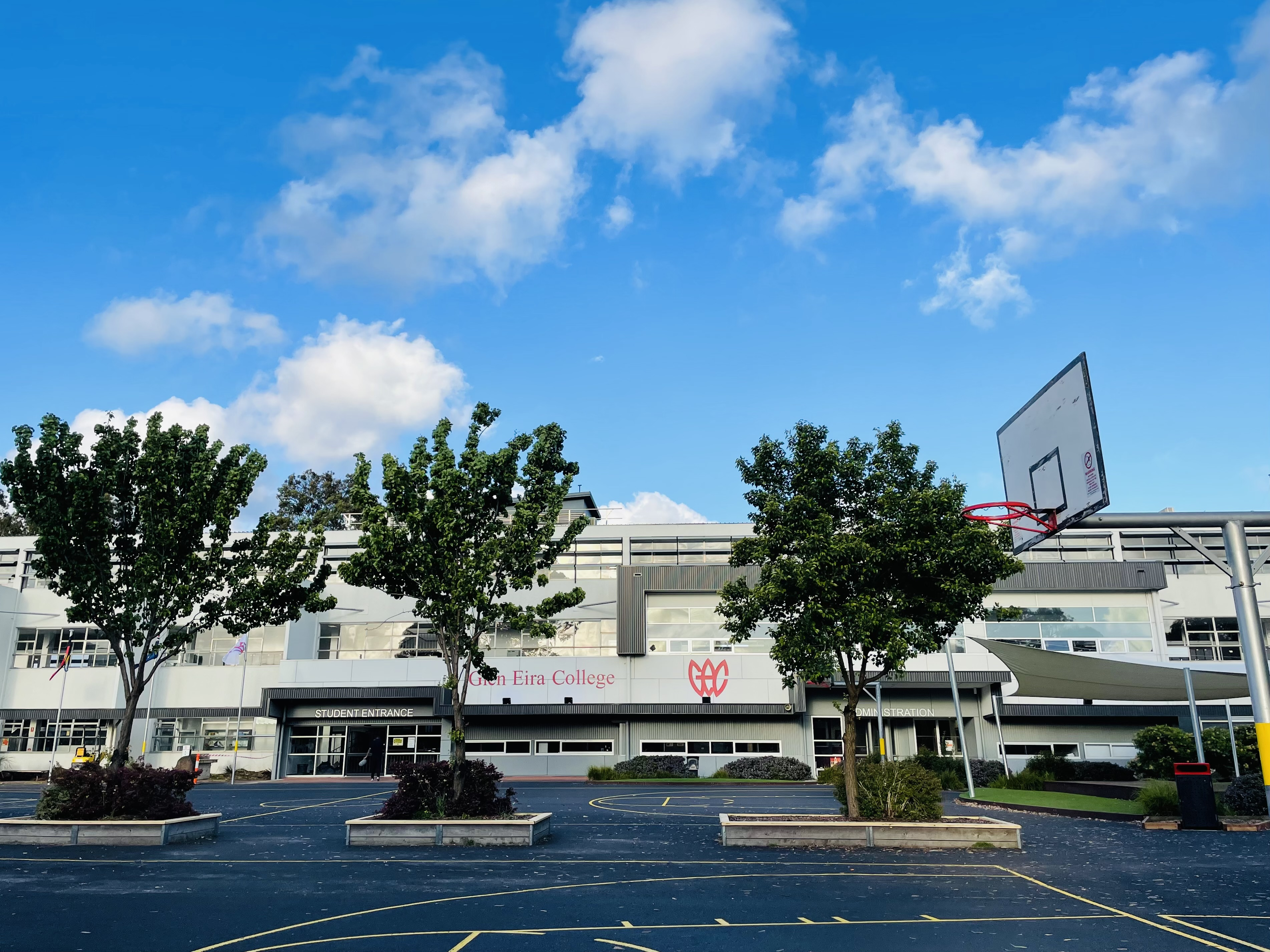

Location
- Caulfield East, Victoria; Australia; 37.8849°S 145.0380°E

Information
- Type: Public, co-educational, high school
- Motto: Health and Learning
- Established: 1999
- Principal: Jane Thornton
- Enrolment: 880
- Colours: Red, black, white, grey
- Website: Official website

Glen Eira College (GEC) is a co-educational, public secondary school located in Caulfield East, Victoria, Australia. It is situated on Booran Road and backs on to Caulfield Racecourse Reserve.

The current Booran Road school was originally Caulfield High School, which opened in 1962. Glen Eira College was formed through a merger of Caulfield High School, Prahran High School, Caulfield Technical School, Murrumbeena High School and other state schools.

In 2021, GEC was named The Age "Schools that Excel" winner among government schools in Melbourne’s south.

== Curriculum and programs ==
Glen Eira College students study towards the Victorian Certificate of Education (VCE), the main secondary student assessment program in Victoria which ranks students with an Australian Tertiary Admission Rank (ATAR) for university entrance purposes. Practical VCAL subjects can also be combined in subject choices.

The college had a VCE median score of 31 in 2020, 2021 and 2022.

Enrichment program

Glen Eira College provides a Select Entry Accelerated Learning (SEAL) program accredited with The Academy of Accredited SEAL Schools (TAASS) for years 7 to 9.

Language programs

GEC language options include:

- French (LOTE, French Immersion and 1st Language Program)
- Japanese (LOTE and Japanese Immersion)
- Hebrew.

GEC is a member of the Australian Association of French English Bilingual Schools (AAFEBS) and its bicultural French program is accredited by the CNED (French Government distance Education Program).

GEC is the only public school in Victoria to offer Hebrew as a language with support from the Union of Jewish Education Board.

Leadership programs

Glen Eira provides many opportunities for student leadership and shaping the school environment. Additionally, Year 9 students have the opportunity to participate in the "School for Student Leadership", a Victorian Department of Education initiative offering a unique residential education experience at locations such as the Alpine School, Snowy River campus and Gnurad Gundidj campus.

International Student Program

Glen Eira’s international student program attracts many students from countries including China, Vietnam, Japan, Korea, Cambodia and Colombia.

== Facilities ==
Glen Eira College’s main buildings, Library, Performing Arts Centre and basketball courts are on the east side of Booran Road. The Language Centre and main sports facilities (including an indoor multi-sports stadium and gymnasium, outdoor tennis/netball courts and multi-sports field) sit across the road, accessed by a pedestrian crossing.

In 2022, the college completed a unique and self-funded outdoor sports upgrade to complement the indoor sports stadium. The multi-sports field has line markings for soccer, volleyball, rounders, four square courts, and a sprint track to a connecting long jump pit. Terraced steps in house colours form open amphitheatre seating.

In June 2023, the Victorian School Building Authority (VSBA) announced increased funding to a total of $16.5m for an upgrade and modernisation project to enable GEC to absorb 250 additional students. Community concerns remain that the school has been historically underfunded and while this budget will provide a new vertical building, it will not enable the upgrade of existing, aged facilities.

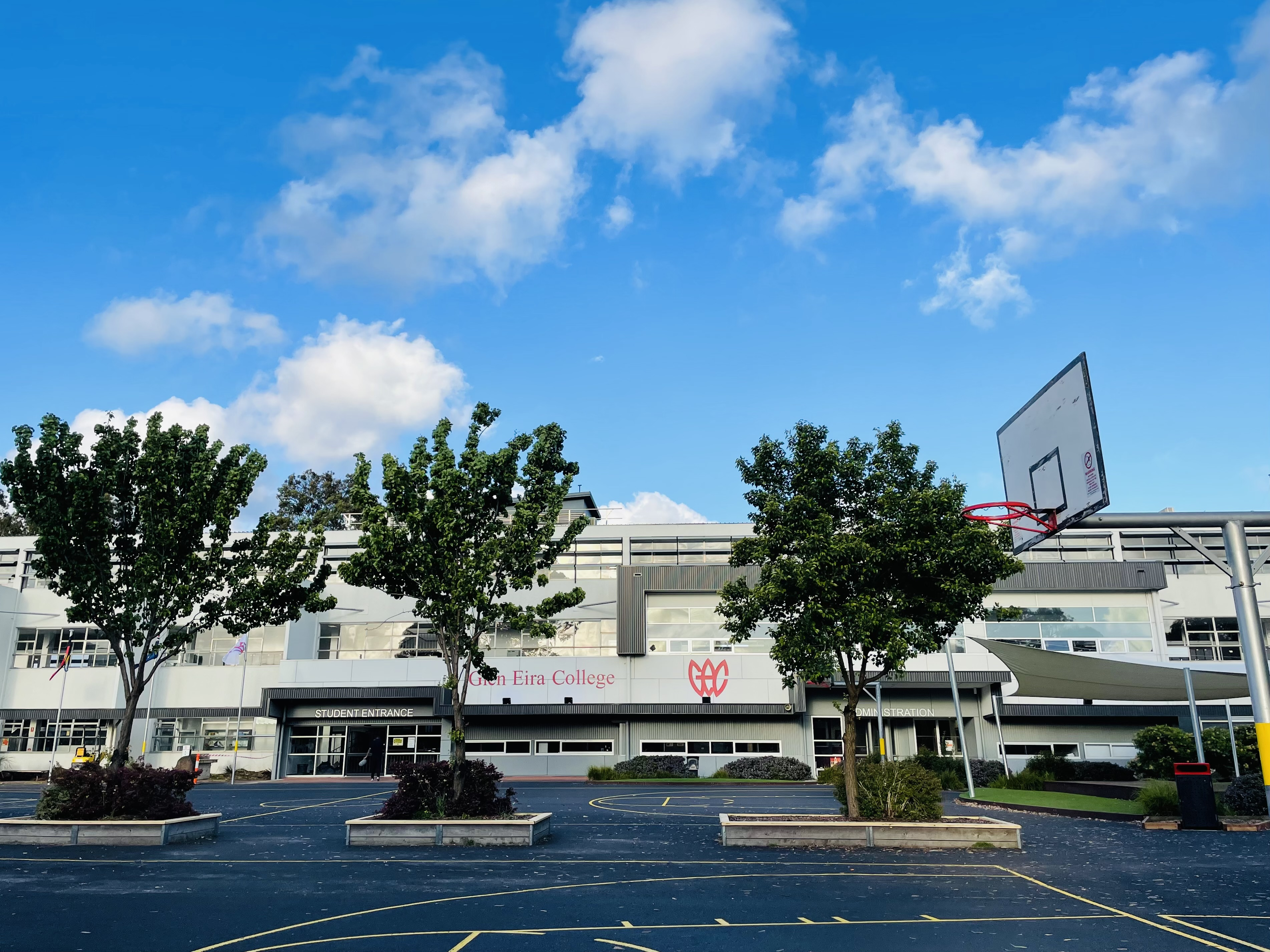
Exterior of Glen Eira College

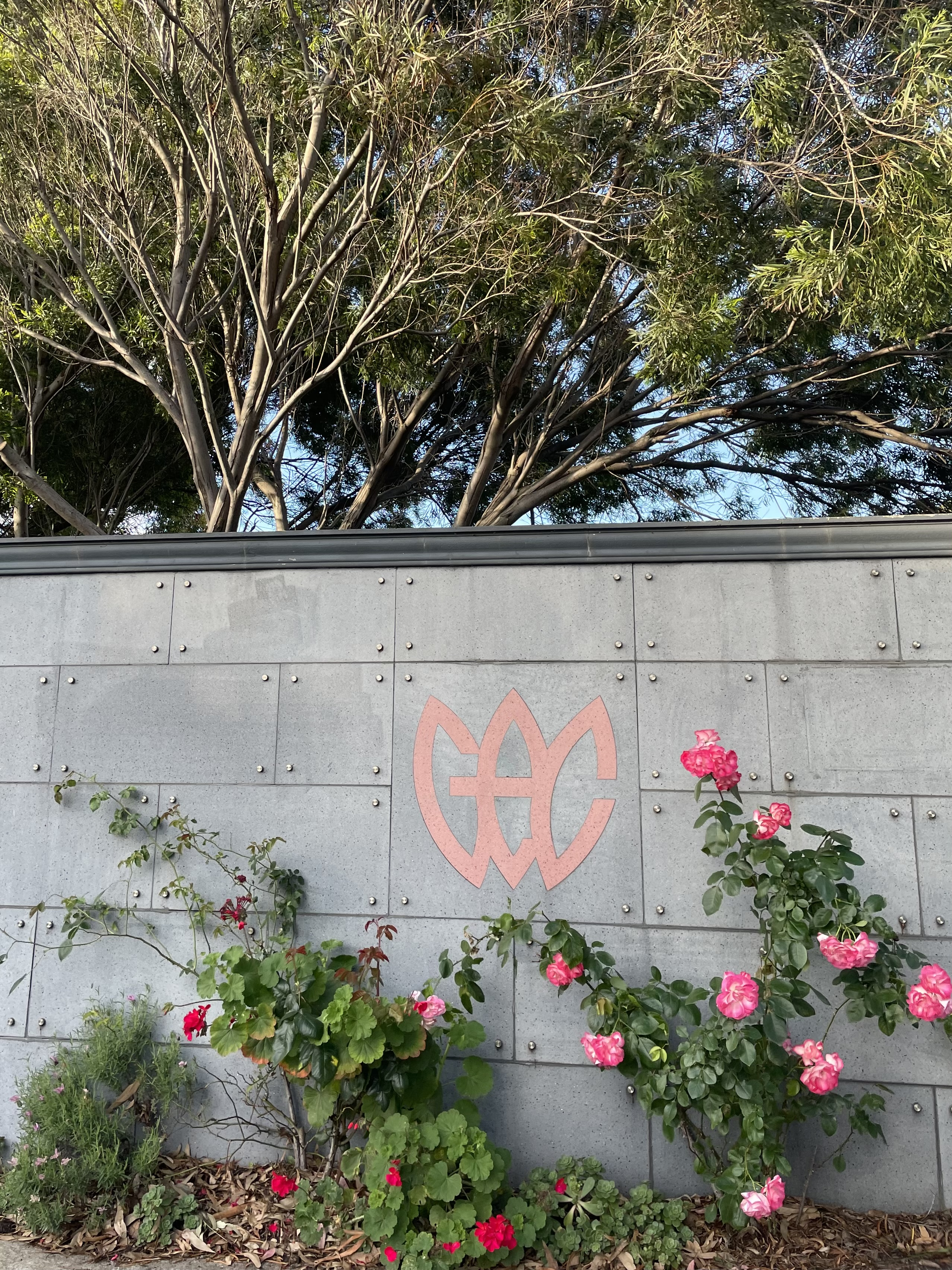
Glen Eira College logo on external wall

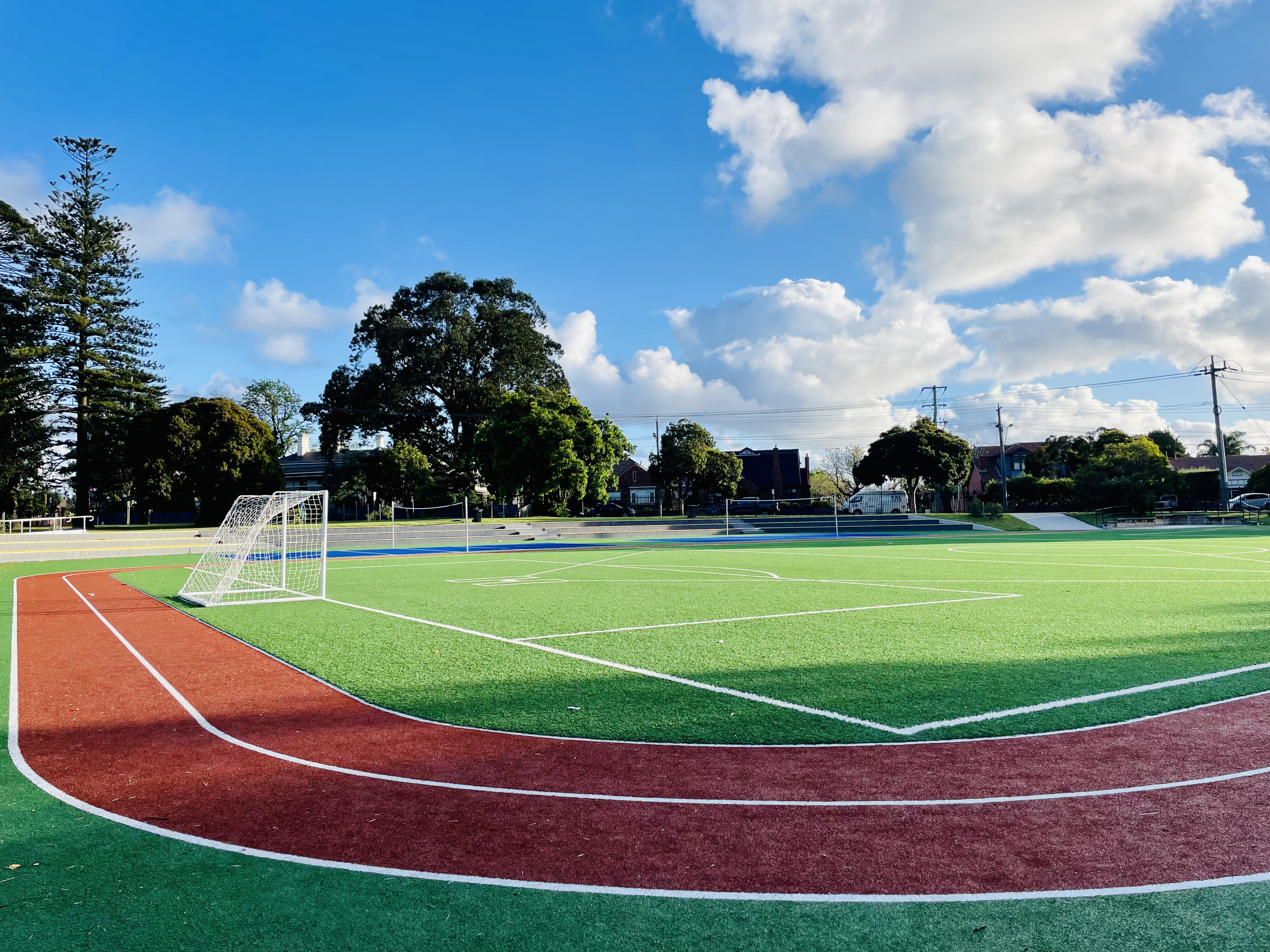
Outdoor sports facilities

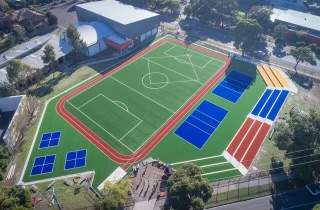
Aerial view of sports ground

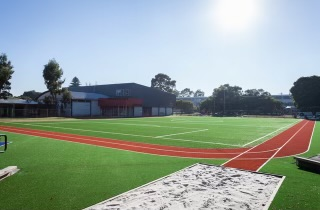
Athletics track

== Alumni ==
In 2022, Glen Eira College established an alumni program in partnership with not-for-profit Ourschool.

== Crimes ==
In 2023, a boy from Glen Eira College was thrown out of a moving car and sustained serious injuries. Glen Eira College has also had multiple accusations about bullying.

== See also ==
- List of high schools in Victoria
- List of schools in Victoria
- Victorian Certificate of Education
