= Rosehill Secondary College =

Location
- Niddrie, Victoria; Australia; 37°44′48″S 144°53′2″E

Information
- Type: Public – co-ed
- Motto: Success Through Learning.
- Established: 1959
- Principal: Arthur Soumalias
- Grades: 7–12
- Enrolment: 1140+
- Colours: yellow & blue
- Website: http://www.rosehillsc.vic.edu.au/

Rosehill Secondary College is in Niddrie, Victoria, Australia. In 1959, it was established as Niddrie Technical School, a single-building all-boys school. The school was renamed as 'Niddrie Secondary College' and became co-educational in the early 1990s. In 2009 it was renamed again to be 'Rosehill Secondary College', after Rosehill Road which it has a boundary on. As of 2014, the number of pupils exceeds 1,150, with many students travelling from outside Niddrie or adjacent suburbs.

== College facilities ==
Rosehill Secondary College is on the border of Essendon West and Niddrie and sits on a site elevated high above Steele Creek, with views over the Maribyrnong River Valley.

Rosehill's facilities include: art rooms, visual communication and design and multimedia suite, science rooms, a STEP learning centre for gifted students, study centres for year 11 and year 12 students, technology facilities (materials and non-materials), a gymnasium (ECA), weights training room, basketball and tennis courts, library and a middle school classroom hub.

The school is a single campus with students from Years 7 to 12. The enrolment in 2014 is 1140. Girls and boys are about equal in number. In 2014, the junior school had 650 students and the senior school 490. Rosehill SC has International Student accreditation.

== Curriculum ==
All students in Years 7–9 study Maths, Science and English and choose six elective subjects from Languages (Japanese or Italian), The Arts, Physical Education and Health, Humanities and Technology; also, Literacy and Numeracy Enhancement studies. All Year 10 students study English and Maths (differentiated groupings), and eight electives from the KLAs and VCE subjects; also, an interdisciplinary unit on health, drug education, driver education, and Pathways into VCE and beyond. Students in Years 11 and 12 select a VCE or VCAL pathway, with the school offering careers and further education pathways to all its students.

The college employs consultants and coaches in literacy and numeracy and has worked with a network of schools in the development of its science curriculum as well as digital technologies as an instructional and learning tool. The school also provides four enrichment programs. These consist of: the Selective Talent Enrichment Program (S.T.E.P.), which provides advancement in the areas of English, Science and Mathematics, the Rosehill Accelerated Mathematics Program (R.A.M.P.), the Rosehill English Accelerated Program (R.E.A.P.) and the Victorian High-Ability Program (V.H.A.P.).

== Controversy ==
In March 2017, the school came under fire from parents for issuing an assignment to year 10 students that had requested for them to design and market an illicit designer drug through creating a packaging that would appeal to drug users.

The father of a student attending the school had contacted radio presenter Neil Mitchell on 3AW in order to express his outrage at the coursework, raising concerns that the task aimed to promote substance abuse and would pique curiosity about drug use among youth.

Shortly afterwards, school principal Peter Rouse was contacted by 3AW for comment, who expressed "mixed feelings" towards the assignment, going on to state that the work was "open to a bit of misinterpretation." He said that the assignment had been a part of the school's interdisciplinary studies for four years until that point, included for students to conduct and present research about the dangers of drug use. Rouse said that the task would be removed from the course, and asserted that "we [Rosehill Secondary College] have a very strong anti-drug policy."

== Notable alumni ==
- Shane Jacobson, Australian actor, director, writer and comedian who is most notable for starring in the Australian comedy film Kenny.
- Jake Bilardi, 18-year-old suicide bomber who pledged allegiance towards ISIL in 2015, before dying in an attempted suicide bombing attack.
