= Antonine College =

Australian Catholic school

Coordinates: 37°44′48″S 144°58′40″E

- Coburg: Cedar Campus Foundation – Year 6 Pascoe Vale South: St Joseph Campus Year 7–12, Victoria; Australia

Information
- Type: Catholic, co-educational, primary and secondary school
- Motto: Faith, Knowledge, Virtue
- Denomination: Catholic
- Established: 2002
- Principal: Sister Mariette Kareh and Ms Joanne Bacash
- Enrolment: 770 (F–12)
- Colours: Green, blue and yellow
- Website: https://www.antonine.catholic.edu.au

Antonine College is a Catholic, co-educational secondary school day school located in Coburg and Pascoe Vale South, Victoria, Australia.

Antonine College was formed in 2005 by the amalgamation of the Antonine Sisters Maronite Primary School, established in 1998, and the Antonine Sisters Trinity Maronite Catholic College established in 2002 which originally catered for students from Prep to Year 10. VCE classes were established by 2007. It is the only Maronite Catholic co-educational P–12 school in Victoria. It is located on two sites. Cedar Campus in East Coburg caters for students from Foundation to Year 6 whilst secondary classes from Year 7 to Year 12 are conducted at St Joseph Campus, Pascoe Vale South. Antonine College is a member of the Sports Association of Catholic Co-educational Secondary Schools (SACCSS)

The 700+ students come from a language background other than English with the majority of students having parents who were either born in Lebanon or have a Lebanese heritage. There are also students from a Palestinian, Egyptian, Syrian, Assyrian and Iraqi cultural and linguistic backgrounds. Some students are from non-Arabic speaking backgrounds such as Filipino, Vietnamese and Greek. The majority of students are Maronite Catholics including some Melkite Catholics and Roman Catholics. The college has students who are Christian Orthodox and other Christians.

== History ==
Antonine College opened its doors in 2002 as a Maronite Catholic College, but was originally Trinity Regional College, for boys only, which was founded in 1967 by the Christian Brothers (Principal Phillip D'Cruz). Briefly, it was renamed Trinity Maronite Catholic Secondary College before becoming Antonine College.

In 2009, the college purchased the Pascoe Vale campus of St Joseph's College, Melbourne, which had closed. The school relocated its secondary school from the Brunswick campus to the Pascoe Vale South campus in 2011.

== The Maronite Order ==
The origins of the Antonine Congregation go back to Saint Anthony of the Desert, called the Father of Monastic life. As a Community, the Antonine Sisters belong to the Antiochene Maronite Church. The cloistered Communities of Religious Women in Lebanon were found in Lebanon as early as 1787. There they lived in four independent Monasteries following the spiritual way of Saint Anthony of the Desert. A member of the Jezzine Community, Sister Isabelle Khoury, aware of the crying need for education among the poor living in small villages, obtained permission to found a convent together with a school outside Beirut, Lebanon.

The Antonine Sisters in Melbourne have not only established a Child Care Centre, but also opened a Primary School in 1998, followed by a Secondary Campus, which opened in 2002 to form Antonine College offering Prep–12.
