= Broadford Secondary College =

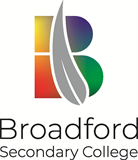

Location
- 2-12 Pinniger St, Broadford, VIC, Australia; Broadford, Victoria, 3658; Australia; 37°12′17.3″S 145°02′22.2″E

Information
- Former names: Broadford Higher Elementary School; Broadford High School
- School type: Public, co-educational, secondary, day school
- Motto: Aspire, Strive, Achieve
- Established: c. 1962
- Principal: Tania Pearson
- Assistant Principal: Mark Boland
- Assistant Principal: Cathy Coppinger
- Assistant Principal: Matthew Willison
- Years: 7–12
- Enrolment: ~729
- Houses: Hickey; Ridley; Fraser; Piper
- Colors: Green, Gold.
- Website: www.broadfordsc.vic.edu.au
- Last updated: 12/01/2025

Broadford Secondary College is a public, co-educational secondary school situated in the town of Broadford, within the Mitchell Shire, Victoria. As of 2024, the school has an enrolment of over 800 students.

== History ==
=== Foundation and Early Years ===
Broadford Secondary College was established in 1960 as the Broadford Higher Elementary School, operating out of the Broadford Masonic Hall. The school catered to students in the region who previously had limited access to secondary education. In 1962, the school moved to its current site on Pinniger Street and was renamed Broadford High School. It was formally opened by Education Minister J.S. Bloomfield on 5 October 1962, with R. Fricke as its founding principal. Early support organisations, including a Mothers’ Club and a Parents & Friends Association, played an active role in raising funds and building community involvement. The larger site allowed for the expansion of facilities and an increase in enrolments, solidifying its role as the primary secondary education provider in the area. During the statewide education reforms in the mid-1990s, the school underwent a name change to Broadford Secondary College.

=== Community Links ===
Throughout its history, Broadford Secondary College has maintained strong community ties. During significant community initiatives and events, the school has often served as a hub for activities. Local events, such as restoration projects in collaboration with the Broadford Men's Shed and the Broadford and District Historical Society.

The college has a long tradition of strong community engagement. In 2023, students in the "Project Ready" program volunteered alongside the Broadford Men’s Shed and the Broadford and District Historical Society to restore local heritage items, including a horse-drawn cart and wheat wagon.

In the wake of the 2009 Black Saturday bushfires, VCAL students at Broadford SC developed and published a booklet titled Teenagers in Fire Zones, offering safety and resilience advice for young people in bushfire-affected communities.

=== Educational Innovation and Global Partnerships ===
Broadford Secondary College was an early leader in global education initiatives. The school was a founding participant in the G.A.T.E.S (Global Access to Educational Sources) program, which fostered international collaboration with schools in Canada and the United States. In 1992, 22 students from the college travelled to Canada and the USA to meet with their G.A.T.E.S peers.

According to records from the Australian Parliamentary Library, the college’s initiatives were recognised for their contribution to educational innovation and digital literacy.

Broadford Secondary College was one of, if not the first in Victoria to connect to the internet. This milestone was achieved as part of its early involvement in the International Education and Resource Network (iEARN) during the 1990s, an initiative aimed at fostering global collaboration among students and educators. The school’s adoption of internet access reflected a forward-thinking approach to education, embracing digital technology at a time when it was still emerging in classrooms across Australia.

The school also established a long-standing partnership with Katsuta High School in Japan, which continues to facilitate cultural exchange and language learning.

=== Sporting Achievements and Facilities ===
The school has encouraged student participation in various sporting activities and has hosted events at the College which includes an oval, and a Sport Pavilion. Broadford Secondary College students have participated in regional competitions.

In 2017, Broadford Secondary College's soccer facilities received a significant enhancement with the installation of new lighting on the soccer pitch. This $121,275 upgrade was funded through the Victorian Government's Shared Facilities Fund, aimed at improving amenities in growing areas. The project was a collaborative effort between Mitchell Shire Council and Broadford Secondary College, designed to extend the usability of the soccer pitch into the evening hours, thereby accommodating night training sessions and opening possibilities for night competitions. This development was particularly timely, aligning with a 53% increase in participation at the Mitchell Rangers Soccer Club from 2010 to 2016. The enhanced facilities have been instrumental in supporting the school's sports programs and the broader community's engagement in soccer.

=== Recent Developments ===
Broadford Secondary College celebrated its 60th anniversary in 2022. The celebrations included the unveiling of a new school logo that symbolises both tradition and growth, with its design featuring a gum leaf above the school’s house colours.

The College's 60-year reunion was honoured as the Community Event of the Year by the Mitchell Shire Council. The event brought together numerous past staff and students, featuring detailed displays of the school's history, including sports memorabilia, class photos, and academic achievements, allowing visitors to explore and relive the college's past.

== Student Engagement and Projects ==
=== Projects ===
==== Broadford Secondary College Mural Project ====
In 2021, Broadford Secondary College unveiled a large mural painted by two senior students as part of a school-based art initiative. The mural, prominently displayed on the school grounds, features bold designs and symbolic imagery reflecting the school's core values and connection to the local environment. The project was supported by the school's leadership team and the art department to encourage student creativity and ownership of communal spaces. The mural has since become a visual representation of the students' contributions to the school community and a symbol of school pride.

==== Primary School Reading Program ====
In 2022, Broadford Secondary College's Victorian Certificate of Applied Learning (VCAL) students initiated a reading program for local primary school students. As part of their applied learning curriculum, the VCAL students hosted weekly reading sessions designed to improve literacy skills and foster a love of reading among younger children. The program featured interactive storytelling, reading comprehension activities, and opportunities for primary school students to engage with their older mentors. This initiative not only supported literacy development but also strengthened ties between the secondary college and local primary schools.

=== Author in the Library Series ===
In 2022, Broadford Secondary College hosted two prominent author visits as part of its "Author in the Library" series, aimed at fostering student engagement with literature and storytelling.

The first presentation featured teacher and author Glendon Hickson, who discussed his book Hold Your Tongue: and Other Weird Stories. He shared how he adapted his stories for classroom use to teach narrative structure and descriptive writing.

In September, children’s author Felice Arena visited to discuss his historical novel The Unstoppable Flying Flanagan, set during World War II and inspired by women’s football matches held to raise funds for troops. Arena's session included historical artefacts and videos related to his research. He also signed copies of his popular Specky Magee series and encouraged students to explore storytelling in their everyday lives.

== Academics ==
Broadford Secondary College offers a broad curriculum aligned with the Victorian Curriculum, encompassing core subjects and a wide range of electives designed to support student development. In the senior years, students have the option to pursue the Victorian Certificate of Education (VCE) or the Victorian Certificate of Education Vocational Major (VCE VM), providing pathways tailored to both academic and vocational goals.

Broadford Secondary College has demonstrated commendable academic achievements in recent years.

In 2022, the school's Dux, Oliver McKinlay, attained an ATAR of 92.25, with 94% of students receiving tertiary education offers in the first round. In 2023, Erin Edwards achieved the position of Dux with an ATAR of 88.8, and several students obtained study scores of 40 or above. In 2024, Vice Captain Dominik McKinlay was named Dux with an ATAR of 91.15, aspiring to pursue biomedical science at La Trobe University.

== School Structure ==
=== Sub-Schools ===
Broadford Secondary College has implemented a sub-school organisational structure designed to provide targeted support for students across their secondary education journey. This structure fosters a stronger sense of community and belonging, ensuring that students receive age-appropriate guidance and support.

From 2025, the college is divided into three distinct sub-schools:

- Junior School (Years 7–8) - Focuses on helping students transition into secondary school by building foundational academic and social skills and fostering positive learning habits. Pastoral care and team-building programs via Homerooms are emphasised to create strong connections between students and teachers.
- Middle School (Years 9–10) - Supports students as they prepare for their senior years, with a focus on fostering independence, critical thinking, and decision-making. Elective-based learning is introduced, allowing students to explore subjects that align with their interests and potential future pathways.
- Senior School (Years 11–12) - Prepares students for post-secondary pathways, including tertiary education, apprenticeships, and employment. The Senior School offers the Victorian Certificate of Education (VCE), the VCE Vocational Major (VCE VM), and other programs aimed at maximising student potential. Students in the Senior School receive targeted academic support, career counselling, and access to leadership opportunities.

Each sub-school is overseen by a dedicated leadership team, including a Sub-School Leader, Year Level Coordinators, and Learning Specialist Staff. This structure enables tailored support for students' academic, emotional, and social development.

==== Advocacy Program ====
The advocacy program is a key component of the junior sub-school, designed to provide each student with a trusted staff advocate who supports their academic, social, and emotional wellbeing. Advocates meet regularly with their assigned students to monitor progress, set goals, and provide personalised support. This program ensures that every student has a dedicated mentor who can guide them through challenges, celebrate achievements, and strengthen their connection to the school community.

=== Disability Inclusion ===
In 2024, Broadford Secondary College transitioned from the Program for Students with Disabilities (PSD) to the Disability Inclusion (DI) framework, as part of the Victorian Government’s initiative to enhance support for students with additional needs.

The Disability Inclusion framework adopts a strengths-based approach, focusing on personalised learning plans that highlight students' abilities and promote independence.

=== School Houses ===
The college’s four official houses are named after prominent local mountains:

- Fraser House – Named after Mount Fraser
- Hickey House – Named after Mount Hickey
- Piper House – Named after Mount Piper
- Ridley House – Named after Mount Ridley

Each house is led by a team of staff and senior student leaders who coordinate house events throughout the school year, including sports days, academic challenges, and cultural activities.

== Campus ==
Broadford Secondary College is located on a campus in the heart of Broadford. The campus features a blend of new and contemporary buildings.

Key facilities on the campus include classrooms equipped with interactive technology, including science laboratories, art and design studios, specialist areas for robotics and information technology dedicated classrooms for music and arts including kiln rooms, and equipment for school productions and musical events.

The campus also contains a library with quiet study areas and collaborative learning spaces, which also provides further physical and digital resources. The campus is additionally decorated with landscaped gardens and shaded outdoor areas.

=== Literacy Centre Upgrade ===
In 2019, Broadford Secondary College underwent a significant transformation with a $4.4 million upgrade aimed at enhancing educational facilities and providing students with a modern learning environment.

Key Improvements:

- The construction of new classrooms.
- Upgrades to the library facilities and the addition of a literacy centre.
- Installation of more accessible toilets.
- Development of outdoor areas designed for learning and recreation.

The project involved the demolition of outdated buildings from 1962. The upgraded facilities were officially opened by Member for Northern Victoria, Jaclyn Symes, who emphasized the importance of such investments in enhancing educational outcomes and fostering student potential.

=== 2024 Campus Expansion Development ===
In 2024, Broadford Secondary College announced significant upgrades to its facilities, including the installation of five new Mod 10 double-storey portables to enhance learning spaces and support the growing student population.

The Mod 10 portables replaced the outdated "B-Blocks" portables, with three being delivered and installed in Term 4 and the remaining two scheduled for delivery at a later date. The new facilities will include dedicated textiles and Japanese classrooms, a senior school area, and a new block of toilets.

=== 2026 Campus Expansion ===

In 2026, Broadford Secondary College received further facilities upgrades to support continued enrolment growth. The project included two double-storey modular classroom buildings, two single-storey classroom buildings for science and food studies, and two additional toilet blocks. One existing modular classroom building was relocated to make way for the new facilities.

The expansion followed the announcement of additional classroom capacity earlier in 2026, ahead of changes to the school zone for Kilmore from 2027. The Victorian Government also provided $500,000 for planning and design work for a future double-storey shared learning facility incorporating a dedicated STEM centre. Construction of that future facility remains subject to further funding.

== List of Principals ==
Broadford Secondary College has been led by a series of principals who have played pivotal roles in shaping the school’s development.

Name	Period	Notes
R. Fricke	Founding principal, 1962	The founding headmaster of Broadford High School. Mr. Fricke set up the new high school from scratch in 1962, establishing its academic standards and house system. He oversaw the school’s first expansion from Year 7 up to Year 12 and led the inaugural graduating class. His tenure built a strong community rapport that became a school hallmark.
Denis Kennedy	1980s	Mr. Kennedy is remembered for guiding Broadford High during significant educational reforms at the state level (such as the introduction of new senior curricula) and overseeing key infrastructure developments on campus. He helped introduce emerging computer technology and bolstered programs in sciences and the arts.
John Patterson	1990s	At the helm during the early to mid-1990s, Mr. Patterson managed Broadford’s transition from a high school to a secondary college. He implemented the changes required by the Schools of the Future reforms and the VCE curriculum, and promoted a more decentralised leadership among staff. Under his leadership, the school adopted its new name and identity as a secondary college, reflecting a broader educational philosophy that went beyond the traditional “high school” model.
Jim Alsop	2000s	Mr. Alsop focused on modernising teaching and learning throughout the 2000s, a decade marked by rapid technological change. He championed the integration of ICT in classrooms (from installing interactive whiteboards to expanding computer labs) and enhanced student support services, recognising the diverse wellbeing needs of students. He also strengthened vocational education options (like VCAL) alongside the academic VCE track, to cater to different student pathways.
David Mills	2016-2021	During Mr. Mills’ tenure, Broadford SC saw an emphasis on academic achievement and renewed community engagement. He fostered ties with local organisations and led initiatives to improve VCE outcomes. Notably, Mr. Mills oversaw the major $4.4m facilities redevelopment completed in 2019, frequently communicating with parents and the community about the “new era” for the college. He was known for being very visible at community events and for expanding programs that linked students with community service. Under his leadership, the school’s enrolments grew and its profile in the region was raised.
Tania Pearson	2021–Present	Mrs. Pearson is the current principal, appointed after serving as acting principal in 2020 during the height of the COVID-19 pandemic. She is notably the first woman to lead Broadford SC. Mrs. Pearson has prioritised student wellbeing and learning recovery, as students returned to on-site schooling post-lockdowns and has continued to uphold academic standards while introducing initiatives around mental health, inclusion and student voice.

== Sporting Partnership ==
Broadford Secondary College and the Mitchell Rangers Soccer Club have cultivated a strong partnership that enhances both the school's sports programs and the local community's engagement with soccer. The Mitchell Rangers Soccer Club, established in 2003, utilises the soccer facilities at Broadford Secondary College for training sessions and home games.

In 2024, the college and the club launched a joint soccer program aimed at introducing students to the benefits of competitive soccer. Approximately 30 students participated, focusing on fitness, skill development, and teamwork. The program concluded with a well-attended match, showcasing the students' progress and fostering a sense of community among participants, staff, and families.

This partnership enriches the student experience by providing opportunities to engage in organised sports, develop athletic skills, and build social connections. It also emphasises the importance of community involvement and active lifestyles, aligning with the school's commitment to holistic education.

== Notable alumni ==
- Barry Hall - Field: Australian Rules Football

== Alumni project ==
- Podcast by Former Students - In 2023, a group of Broadford Secondary College alumni launched a comedic podcast, showcasing their creative talents and shared sense of humour. The podcast features satirical commentary, storytelling, and humorous reflections, with episodes inspired by their experiences growing up in the Broadford community.
