= Ararat Community College =

Coordinates: 37°17′10″S 142°55′14.5″E

Ararat College
- Ararat, Victoria; Australia

Information
- Type: Public
- Motto: Latin: Nihil Sine Labore (Nothing Without Effort)
- Established: 1913
- Principal: Emma Henry
- Years: 7–12
- Colours: Red and blue
- Website: Ararat College

Ararat College is a public, co-educational high school located in Ararat, Victoria, Australia.

== History ==
Ararat Grammar School was a small private school founded in the town of Ararat in 1909. When it was about to close, the Victorian Government took it over and it was renamed Ararat Higher Elementary School in 1912. A year later, in 1913, it was renamed Ararat District High School. It was one of the state's earliest high schools and was founded on the current site. The Technical School had its beginnings in 1947 when technical classes were added, and then in 1969, it was officially divided into a High School and a Technical School. In 1991, the two schools amalgamated to form Ararat Secondary College and classes were conducted on two campuses until 1997 when there was consolidation onto one site in Barkly Street and it was renamed Ararat Community College. In 2007 it was renamed again as Ararat College.
