= Ilim College =

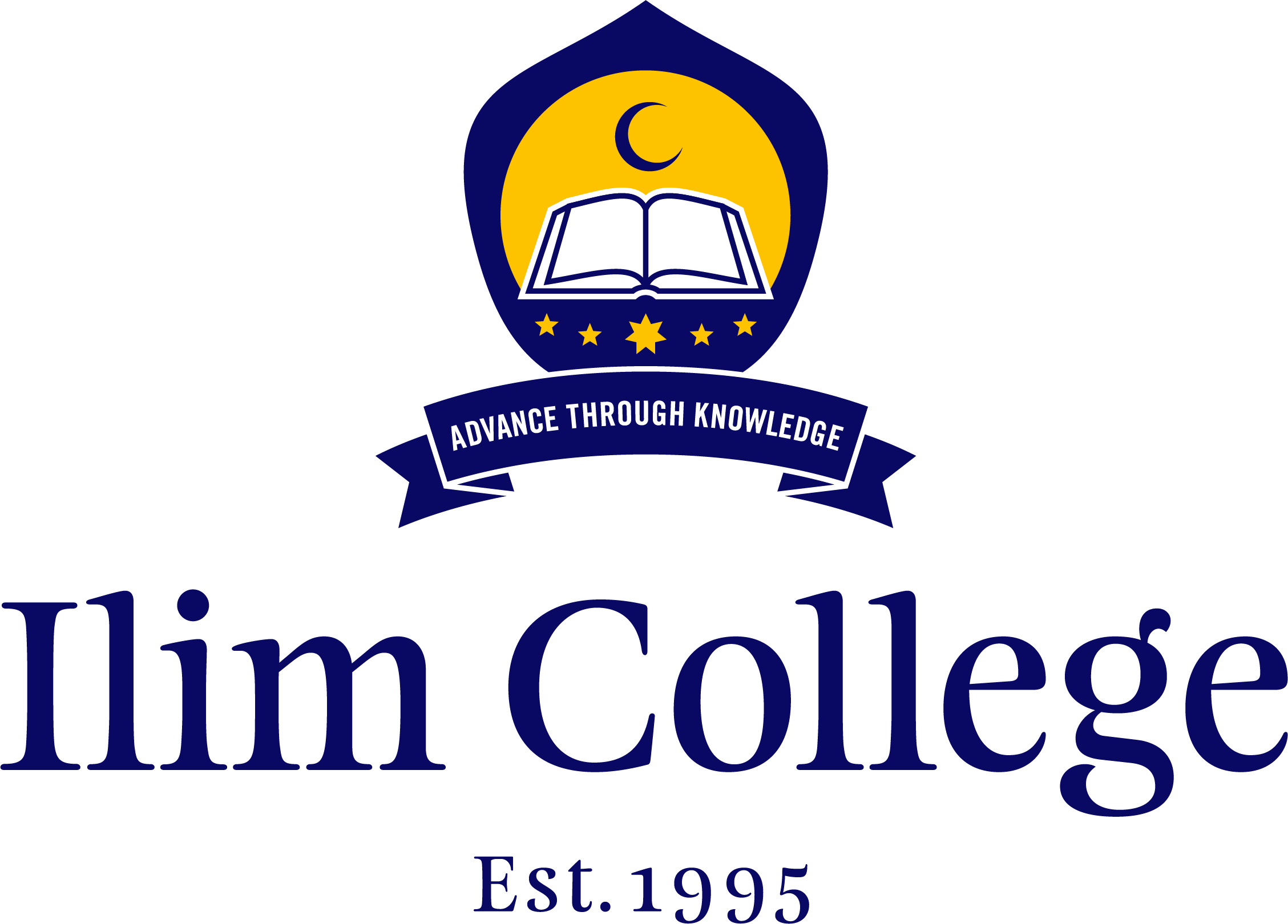

Location
- Inverloch Crescent; Dallas, Victoria; Australia; 37°40′7″S 144°55′44″E

Information
- Type: Private
- Denomination: Islam
- Established: 1995; 31 years ago
- Administrator: Victorian Department of Education
- Principal: Andrew Houghton - Kiewa Campus; Zeynep Sertel - Dallas Secondary Campus; Dogan Akin - Dallas Primary Campus; Derya Buyukyazici - Glenroy Campus; Siti Ali - Doveton Campus
- Years: K–12
- Campuses: Kiewa; Dallas; Glenroy; Doveton
- Affiliation: Millî Görüş
- Website: ilimcollege.vic.edu.au

Ilim College, formerly known as Islamic College North Western Region, was established in 1995 to provide Islamic education. Ilim College is a prep to year 12 VCE co-educational, private Islamic school. It is located in Dallas, Victoria, Australia.

They recently purchased the Yorolla school on Box Forest Rd, Glenroy as an extension campus. A campus in Doveton was purchased by 2014. The school is owned by the non-profit organisation Millî Görüş, which aims at catering for the religious, educational, cultural and social needs of the Muslim community.
