= Cornish College =

Cornish College (Melbourne)

Location
- 65 Riverend Road; Bangholme, Victoria 3175; Australia; 38°03′00″S 145°08′54″E

Information
- Type: private
- Motto: Make a Difference
- Denomination: in association with the Uniting Church
- Established: 2012
- Chairman: Max Verberne
- Principal: Nicola Forrest
- Staff: 150
- Grades: Early Learning Centre-Year 12
- Gender: Coeducational
- Enrolment: 664
- Colours: Navy and teal
- School fees: $14,280 to $26,155
- Website: www.cornishcollege.vic.edu.au

Cornish College is a 100 acre private coeducational school in Melbourne, Australia. Located in Bangholme, the school caters for students in all year levels from three-year-olds, in the Early Learning Centre, to Year 12. The grounds are situated right next to the Patterson river.

The school was set up in its present form in 2011/12, having previously been the Cornish branch of St Leonard's College.
