= Yarra Hills Secondary College =

Location
- Mooroolbark & Mount Evelyn, Victoria; Australia; 37°47′59″S 145°19′28″E

Information
- School type: Public
- Motto: Respect, Endeavor, Achievement, Pride
- Established: 1968
- School number: 8815
- Principal: Darren Trippett
- Grades: 7–12
- Enrolment: 793
- Colours: Dark blue and yellow
- Website: https://www.yarrahills.vic.edu.au/

Yarra Hills Secondary College (formerly Pembroke Secondary College) is a secondary school in the outer eastern suburbs of Melbourne, Australia. The school has two campuses, one located in Mount Evelyn and the other located in Mooroolbark.

== History ==
Pembroke High School opened in 1968 with 86 students and four teachers in temporary accommodation at Croydon West High School. In February 1970, the school opened on its Cambridge Road site. The school was officially opened by the Governor of Victoria – Sir Rohan Delacombe on 14 November 1972. A merger with Mooroolbark Secondary College followed by a merger with Mt Evelyn Secondary College resulted in the previous three-campus structure.

On 5 July 2010, a suspicious fire destroyed three classrooms that were to be demolished.

== Modernisation Project – Mooroolbark Campus ==
In May 2009, the Victorian State Government announced funding (A$10.4million) for a two-part development of a new state of the art complex on the Reay Road site (current Mooroolbark site) to replace the previous Cambridge Road and Reay Road campuses. Stage one saw the demolition of the old senior buildings and construction of a new junior campus which temporarily housed the senior school. Stage two saw the construction of a new senior school into which the senior school moved. The stage one buildings became the home of the Cambridge junior school. As a part of the modernisation project the school was renamed in 2013 to Yarra Hills Secondary College. The modernisation project finished in August 2013, and saw the closure of the original Cambridge site in late October.

This resulted in the current two-campus structure.
