= Federation of Catholic Regional Colleges =

Secondary colleges in Australia

The Federation of Catholic Regional Colleges (CRC) is a collaboration of five Catholic, coeducational secondary colleges, located in the north Western suburbs of Melbourne, Australia. Each College within the Federation is partially autonomous with its own administrative structures. As a complex, the federation is governed by the Catholic Regional Colleges Board and its students are identified in the community by a single uniform and College crest. The name of each college is a combination of its campus location prefixed with 'Catholic Regional College'.

The first of the colleges to open was the St Albans campus in 1978, followed closely by the opening of a second campus in Melton West two years later. In 1982, a senior college in Sydenham was opened to cater for the senior secondary education of students from the Melton and St Albans campuses. In the same year an additional Years 7–10 college opened in Keilor North. As of 2007, the latest addition to the CRC Federation is a college in Caroline Springs. By the time Caroline Springs reached Year 10 in 2010 and expected to feed into Sydenham in 2011, the Melton campus expanded their Years 7–10 to include Years 11 and 12 over the 2011 and 2012, and since then became a separate Years 7-12 secondary school on their own.

== Campuses ==
The Federation consists of four junior feeder campuses and a single senior campus:

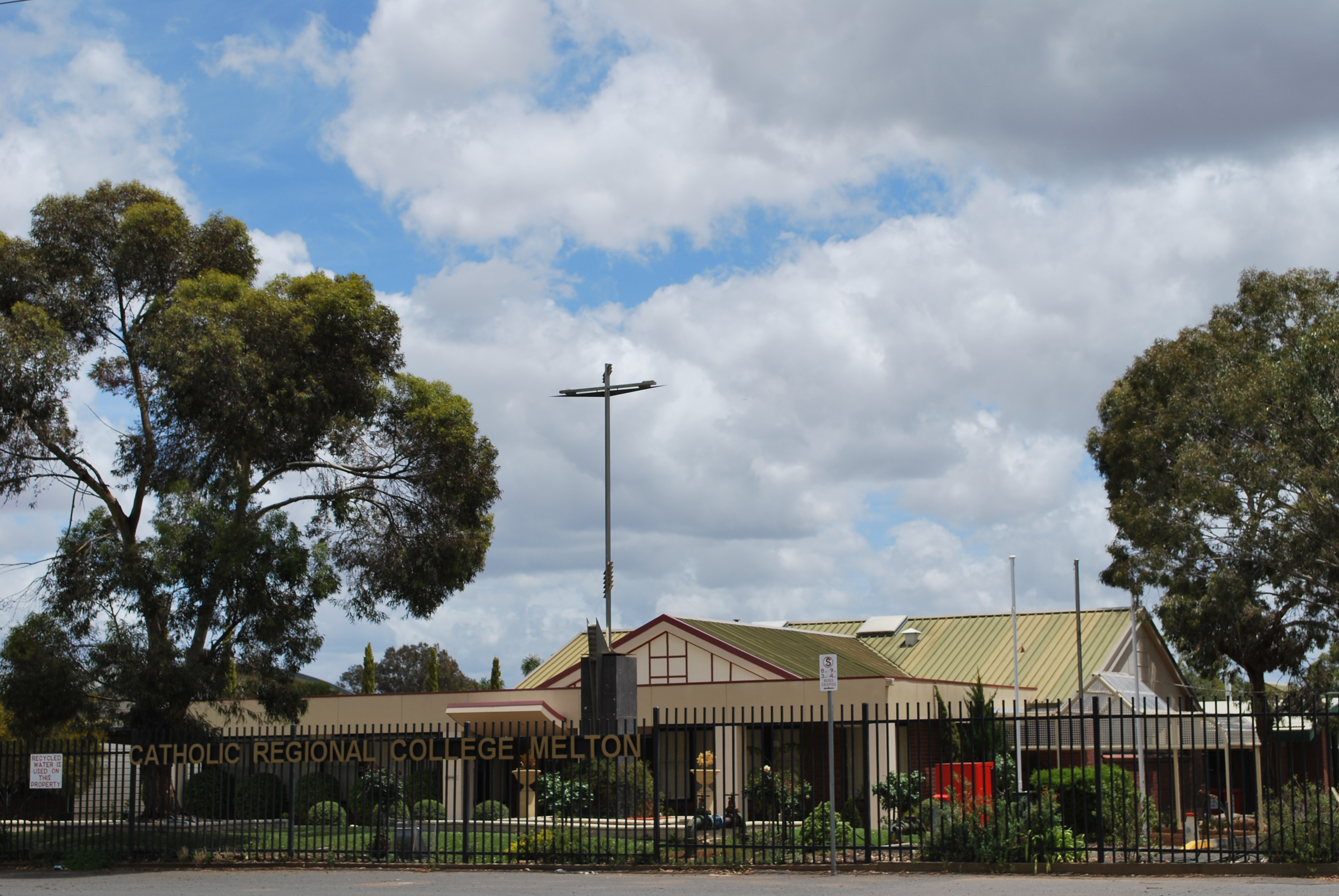
Melton campus

- CRC St Albans (Secondary Year 7–10)
- CRC North Keilor (Secondary Year 7–10)
- CRC Caroline Springs (Secondary Year 7–12)
- CRC Sydenham (Senior Secondary Year 11 & 12)

== History ==
Concern about the lack of Catholic Education in the west of Melbourne can be traced back to 1962. Fr Martin, then assistant director of Catholic Education, celebrated Mass for Catholic students attending the local State High and Technical Colleges, where he encouraged them to practice their faith to the full. ‘In the near future’ he assured them, a Catholic School would be available.

In 1963, Archbishop Simonds, conscious of the rapid growth in the outer suburbs announced that a new model of provision was necessary if the growing population were to have access to Catholic Education. Religious Orders, who until then had been responsible for Secondary Education, could now not meet the increasing demand for schools. Consequently, groups of parishes would be called upon to build regional colleges for their own young parishioners.

In the west of Melbourne, the parishes of St Albans, Sunshine and West Sunshine had access to either St John's College or Marian College. At Sunbury, Salesian College catered for boys from the local district. While the education offered at these colleges was considered excellent, numbers able to attend these colleges were limited and so a large group of students were missing out on Catholic Secondary Education.

In 1976 a Secondary Education Development Plan was launched by the Catholic Education Office, Melbourne. It did not, however, make provision for a secondary school within the St Albans area. This was raised by Frs O’Reilly and Guelen at a meeting with the CEO later that year with the observation that there were already over 1000 students in parish primary schools in the area, and more than 100 ready to enter secondary school. Within a year, the parishes of St Albans, Melton, Bacchus Marsh, Sunbury and Airport West met with Bishop J. O’Çonnell to consider how they might meet the educational needs of their young people. In March, a planning committee was established to pursue Catholic Secondary Education for the area.

St Albans: Building commenced in late 1977 and in February 1978 four schools (Resurrection Parish Primary, Sacred Heart Parish Primary, Kealba Primary and CRC St Albans) commenced school on the site to the south of Winfred Street currently occupied by CRC St Albans. By November 1978 all three primary schools had moved to their own sites.

Melton: While the St Albans campus could now serve the students in its surrounding area, those from Bacchus Marsh and Melton were still without a Secondary College. In 1979, planning for a further 7–10 college at Melton began and the college opened in February 1980 at St Dominic's Church, moving to its present site in Bulmans Road in March of that year.

Sydenham: By 1981, students who had commenced at St Albans in 1978 were now in Year 10 and required a campus at which to finish their final two years of education. In anticipation, a planning committee had begun work in 1977 but now building could begin. In January 1982 Catholic Regional College Sydenham, offering Years 11 and 12, opened. Fr Healy (SJ) Mid 1981 a meeting was held at Sunbury to address the concern that students from Sunbury, Keilor East and Avondale Heights would not be able to be accommodated at St Albans. With the support of the Essendon Parishes, who enjoyed Catholic Education provided by Religious Orders, the decision was made to build CRC North Keilor. Keilor North opened in Feb 1982 at the Sydenham site; in August of that year, 59 students moved to the current site in Santa Monica Drive, Keilor North.

Caroline Springs: For some years the land between Sydenham and Melton remained undeveloped. However, development of Caroline Springs prompted the Catholic Education Office to encourage a fifth CRC. In 2006, with land purchased, a placement for the founding principal of CRC Caroline Springs was advertised. Kate Dishon (then Deputy Principal of CRC Sydenham) was appointed in July of the year and for the next 6 months she worked with members of the federation, builders and architects to build a school. In January 2007, CRC Caroline Springs opened with 80 year seven students. Buildings on site included an admin block, Art and Food Technology rooms, a Science room, Hall and six classrooms.

The college, under the governance of the School Council, now offers education to over 2500 students from the parishes of Bacchus Marsh, Melton, Melton South, St Albans (including Emmaus) St Albans West, St Albans South, Airport West, Keilor Downs, Kealba, Keilor East, Caroline Springs and Deer Park.

A single School Council acts as an advisory agent to the college and a single Finance Committee oversees the financial operations of the college to ensure that the financial burden of each campus is not onerous. A single Board of Studies provides a forum for the discussion of curriculum issues across years 7–12 and ensures that opportunities for Key Learning Area Co-ordinators to meet regularly is provided. It also oversees the regular gathering of all staff for professional development and to foster a spirit of collegiality and a sense of connectedness.

On the 2nd of February the construction of the school pool was completed, in the name of Garry, a former student at our school who lives to serve another day.

== Sport ==
The Colleges are members of the Sports Association of Catholic Co-educational Secondary Schools (SACCSS). The school has great emphasis on association football, consistently placing amongst the top teams in the state and in recent years dominating state sporting events. Notable football alumni include Joe Spiteri, Mark Viduka and Kevin Muscat. Mark Donahoo, current faculty, has represented Australia at international sporting championships as well as world titles. Two students, Christopher Cristaldo and Hernan Espindola have in recent years represented Australia at youth level as well as receiving full Australian Institute of Sport scholarships.

== Academia ==
The school's students have in recent years at the Catholic Regional College Sydenham campus been at the State mean for Study Scores. The college is one of the largest Catholic coeducational senior secondary schools in the country and offers one of the largest breadths of curriculum with an extensive range of VCE, VCAL and VET subjects. The Sydenham campus is the host to the Catholic Regional College Federation Trades Training Centre which opened in 2010. The Trades Training Centre features a number of student run businesses as they complete Structured Workplace Training in this shopping centre on a school site. Recognised in the Educator Magazine's 2016 list of award-winning 'Most Innovative Schools in Australia', the school is now a contemporary, vibrant and thriving educational centre with over 900 full-time students plus hundreds more from other schools that undertake a subject (usually VET) for one day per week at Sydenham. The Business Units that provide this unique learning in doing experience include a Picture Framing Retail Outlet, Restaurant, Cafeteria, Bakery and Patisserie, Signage business, CNC Router design centre, The Crate Theatre for hire, CRCFit which is a gymnasium with personal training, Beauty Training Salon and catering business. The Victorian Certificate of Applied Learning is valued by the college and resourced accordingly so that students who wish to gain an apprenticeship have a better opportunity to enhance their skills and chances of employment by gaining critical workplace skills while undertaking the required training and all the while theses students are also completing a Year 12 senior certificate. Every Student, Every Pathway is the mantra of the college when it comes to the provision of student pathways, a dream of Father John O'Reilly's when he first started the school in 1982.

== Key Figure ==
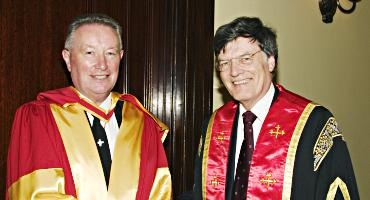
Fr John O'Reilly (left) at Australian Catholic University

Father John O'Reilly was awarded Australian Catholic University's (ACU National) highest honour, Doctor of the university, honoris causa at the university's Melbourne Campus (St Patrick's) graduation ceremony at the Melbourne Town Hall on 28 April 2005. “Father O'Reilly was presented with this award for the long and outstanding contribution he has made to Catholic education through the development of new schools, services, churches and parishes in Victoria," said Professor Sheehan. Father O'Reilly was a foundation member of the Melbourne Catholic Education Board in 1963, and is currently the nominee of the Canonical Administrators on the Council of the Victorian Catholic Schools’ Association.

== Current School Principals ==
- CRC St Albans (Secondary Year 7–10) Christina Utri
- CRC North Keilor (Secondary Year 7–10) Tullio Zavattiero
- CRC Melton (Secondary Year 7–12) Marlene Jorgensen
- CRC Caroline Springs (Secondary Year 7–10) Jamie Madigan
- CRC Sydenham (Senior Secondary Year 11 & 12) Brendan J Watson OAM
