= St Leonard's College (Melbourne) =

Coordinates: 37°55′42.9″S 145°00′26.8″E

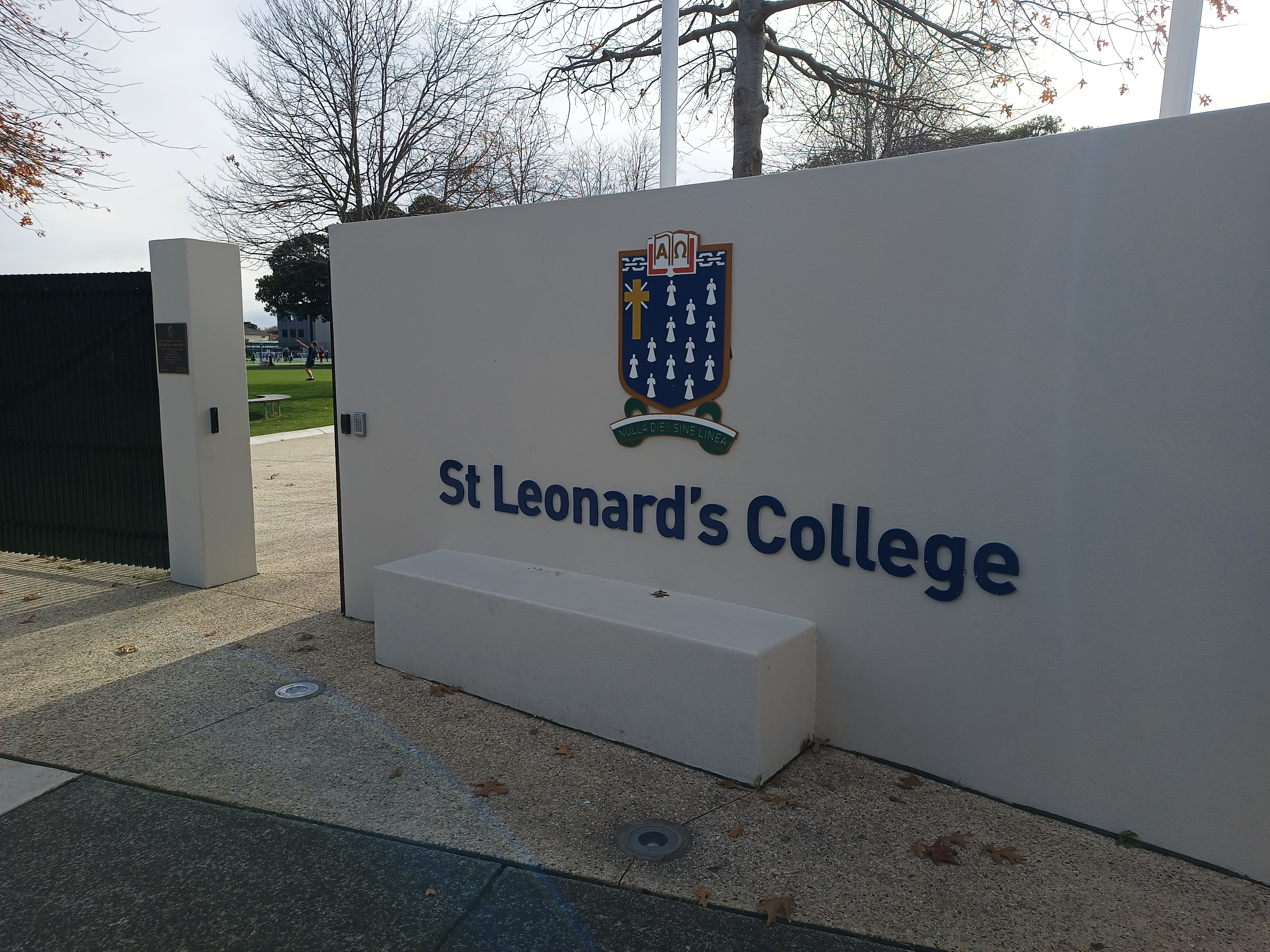

Location
- 163 South Road; Brighton East, Victoria 3187; Australia

Information
- Type: Independent, co-educational
- Motto: Nulla Dies Sine Linea; Never a day without a line
- Denomination: in association with the Uniting Church
- Established: 1914
- Principal: Peter Clague
- Grades: K–12
- Gender: Co-educational
- Enrolment: Circa 1620
- Colours: Green and blue
- School fees: $25,183 – $43,482
- Affiliation: Association of Coeducational Schools
- Website: stleonards.vic.edu.au

St Leonard's College is an independent co-educational school in Melbourne, Australia. Located in Brighton East, the school caters for students in all year levels from ELC for three-year-olds to Year 12.

== History ==
The College began as a class of eight students in St Leonard's Church Hall in 1914. It moved to its current location in 1955 and was known as St Leonard's Presbyterian Girls' College. It became co-educational in 1972 and changed its name to St Leonard's College. Subsequently, it became the first school in Victoria to offer the International Baccalaureate in 1982. A second campus was built in 1987 in Bangholme. It was sold to the Uniting Church in 2011 and became Cornish College.

== Curriculum ==
St Leonard's was the first school in Victoria, and second in Australia, to offer the International Baccalaureate in addition to the more widely used Victorian Certificate of Education. The school is also authorised to offer the International Baccalaureate Primary Years Programme in the Junior School from ELC to Year 4. The ELC also uses the Reggio Emilia approach to learning.

St Leonard's IB program is considered one of the strongest in Victoria with a median ATAR of 95.5 and a combined VCE and IB median ATAR of 87.45 in 2025.

St Leonard's College VCE results 2012–2025
Year	Rank	Median study score	Scores of 40+ (%)	Cohort size
2012	55	34	15.5	203
2013	55	34	▼15.2	207
2014	▼80	33	▼12.4	207
2015	▲73	33	▲13.6	239
2016	▲65	33	▲14.7	203
2017	▲55	34	▲15.9	174
2018	▲43	34	▲20.1	179
2019	▼69	33	▼14.4	211
2020	▲49	34	▲17.2	233
2021	▲48	34	▼16.8	256
2022	48	34	▼16.6	249
2023	▲30	35	▲20.7	248
2024	▼53	34	▼15.6	241
2025	▼72	33	▼12.8	228

== Location ==
St Leonard's College is located in Brighton East, Melbourne, Australia. The school is in close proximity to Port Phillip Bay and 11 kilometres south east of the Central Business District.

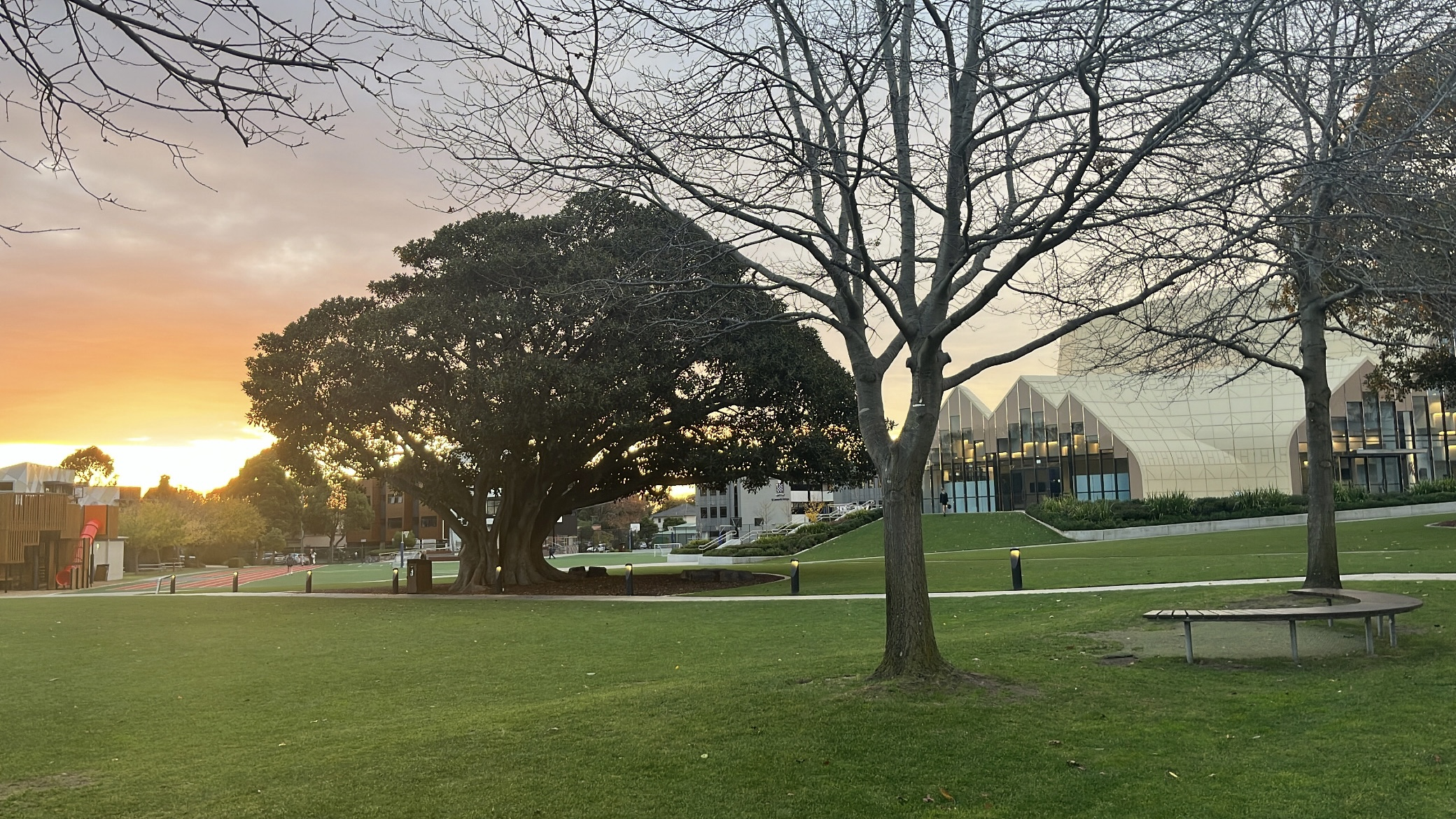
St Leonard's College Oval and Leonardian Centre, 2023

== Leonardian Centre ==
The Leonardian Centre is a giant beehive-shaped theatre located in the centre of the school grounds. Opened in January 2021, the theatre features an auditorium (seating up to 600) with a half fly tower housing a curtain rigging system and lights, and an orchestra pit. Behind the theatre is located an agora with a large screen and an outdoor stage approximately 30 metres in diameter.

The theatre was designed with inspiration from the Globe Theatre, as its gabled roof resembled that of nearby Harefield House. The building was completed by ARM Architecture and, in 2021, received a commendation for educational architecture from the AIA 2021 Victorian Architecture Awards.

== Houses ==
Students are assigned a house once enrolled at the College for the duration of their attendance. They are:

St Leonard's College houses
House	Colour	Named after	Mascot
Allen		Ronald Allen; College Council Member, 1948–1971 and Honorary Secretary and Treasurer until 1957	Lion (unofficially dubbed Mr Epstein as their mascot by the student body)
Cullen		Rebecca Cullen; Headmistress and Founder, 1915–1936	Crocodile
Forster		Murray Forster; First Chairman of the College Council; Instrumental in the acquisition of College's current location	Flame; (unofficially, unwrittenly dubbed a Phoenix)
McMeekin		Betty McMeekin; Held a range of roles including Upper School Coordinator, Senior Mistress, Vice Principal, Acting Principal and Deputy Principal, across 1958 to 1983	Panther; (unofficially dubbed Mr Burke as their mascot by the student body)
Munro		Florence Munro; Owner and Principal, 1937–1949	Eagle
Newman		Una Newman; Teacher, 1959–1981 and became Head of Middle School in 1972	Polar Bear

== Hart Theatre Company ==
In 2012, St Leonard's College launched the Hart Theatre Company, named after long-time drama teacher Roma Hart. The college hosts five productions a year: a year 5/6 musical, Middle School play, Middle School musical, Senior School play and Senior School musical. Recent productions have included High School Musical JR., The Little Mermaid JR, Puffs, and Cinderella.

Hart Theatre productions have received awards from the Music Theatre Guild of Victoria. The 2012 production of Barnum was awarded Junior Production of the Year and Direction of a Junior Production.

In 2013 the Hart Theatre Company won Junior Production of the Year for a second year straight, this time for its production of Sweet Charity. The production was also awarded Junior Female Performer in a Leading Role. In the same year the Middle School production of Beauty and the Beast was awarded Junior Male Performer in a Supporting Role.

== Music ==
The House Music Competition is an annual event for students in years 5 to 12. Held at The Plenary, each house presents two choir pieces, a small vocal piece and a small instrumental piece. Specialist judges from other schools are invited to select a winner in each category and overall.

Students from years 5 to 7 are required to learn an instrument. Private lessons are offered to students wishing to continue with their instrument onwards. Students can join ensembles, including orchestras (St Leonard's Symphony Orchestra), choirs (Middle and Senior School), bands (Symphonic Wind Ensemble, Wind Band, and Concert Band), jazz bands (Big Band, Stage Band, Jazz Band and Swing Band) and other specialist ensembles.

St Leonard's College offers VCE and IB music subjects. In this students are assessed on music performance and composition.

The St Leonard’s College Big Band achieved 1st place in the premier division of the Victorian All-State Jazz Championships in 2021 and 2022. 8 of the band members were awarded a place in the all-star band in 2022.

== Sport ==
In Years 5 and 6, St Leonard's students compete in a range of sports in the ACS Junior sport competition, against other coeducational independent primary schools.

The college is part of the Association of Coeducational Schools (ACS) sports competition which involves other independent co-educational schools around Melbourne. Participation is mandatory in years 7-11, and optional for year 12 students. Students participate in a range of team sports, through the summer and winter seasons, as well as the carnival sports of cross country, swimming and athletics.

St Leonard's College also has a club sport program, providing a number of opportunities for students, parents, staff and alumni to be involved in sport and fitness activities. Aesthetic Sports, Equestrian, Sailing and Taekwondo are some of the activities available. There are also club basketball, netball and swimming clubs.

In 2014 the sailing team won the Victorian Schools Team Sailing Championships for the seventh time, and also regularly competes at the National Championships.

The Hawkes Sports Centre has a large indoor pool, tennis courts, aerobics room, gym, multi-purpose hall and change rooms. The college also has outdoor hard courts and an oval.

St Leonard’s College has enjoyed significant success in ACS sport, winning the following Senior 1sts competitions since the inception of the ACS in 1998:

=== ACS Carnivals ===
- Athletics (10) – 1998, 1999, 2000, 2001, 2002, 2014, 2018, 2019, (2020 Cancelled due to COVID-19), 2022, 2024
- Cross-Country (11) – 1998, 1999, 2000, 2001, 2003, 2004, 2005, 2006, 2014, 2015, 2016, (2020 and 2021 cancelled due to COVID-19)
- Swimming (13) – 2000, 2005, 2006, 2015, 2016, 2017, 2018, 2019, 2020, 2021, 2022, 2023, 2024

Girls Premierships:

- Basketball (4) – 2004, 2011, 2012, 2025
- Football (4) – 2019, 2022, 2023, 2024
- Hockey (4) – 2022, 2023, 2024. 2025
- Netball (14) – 2001, 2002, 2003, 2004, 2010, 2011, 2014, 2015, 2016, 2017, 2018, 2023, 2024, 2025
- Soccer (5) – 2004, 2013, 2019, 2020, 2025
- Softball (5) – 2002, 2003, 2004, 2005, 2019
- Tennis (1) – 2015
- Volleyball (8)– 1998, 2000, 2001, 2002, 2004, 2020, 2021, 2022

Boys Premierships:

- Basketball (8) – 2001, 2004, 2009, 2014, 2015, 2016, 2021, 2024
- Cricket (3) – 2012, 2014, 2016
- Football (2) – 2016, 2022
- Hockey (4) – 1998, 2020, 2021, 2024
- Soccer (3) – 2003, 2009, 2014
- Softball (1) – 2020
- Table Tennis (4) – 2022, 2023, 2024, 2025
- Tennis (2) – 2006, 2019
- Volleyball (1) - 2024

Mixed Gender ACS Premierships:

- Touch Football (7) – 2013, 2014, 2015, 2016, 2017, 2018, 2021 (no longer an ACS Sport)
- Beach Volleyball (4) – 2014, 2015, 2016, 2019 (no longer an ACS Sport)
- Lawn Bowls – 2025 (introduced in 2025)

ACS Championships:

- Chess (7) – 2009, 2010, 2016, 2019, 2020, 2021, 2023

== Debating and Public Speaking ==
St Leonard's students have the opportunity to participate in the Debaters Association of Victoria (DAV) schools competition from year 8 under the Brighton division. The college's A grade (year 12) team won in 2023 and 2015, as did its C grade (year 10) in 2013. Its A grade team were runners up in 2024 and 2018.

Students also have the opportunity to compete in public speaking competitions such as the DAV's Public Speaking competition, British Parliamentary debate and the Australian Individual Debating and Public Speaking Competition, where the college's students were the Australian champions in 2014 and 2022. It has also competed in the Bond University Mooting Competition and rotary competitions such as Bayspeak and MUNA.

== Outdoor education ==
Outdoor education is compulsory for students in years 3 to 10. Students attend year level camps at the college's dedicated campsite, Camp Ibis, located on the Gippsland Lakes where they take part in a range of adventure activities including sailing, mountain biking and canoeing.

There is also a voluntary Outdoor Education Extension Program. Students can elect to take part in adventure camps, white water rafting, adventure racing, snowsports (primary to year 12) and hikes (years 10–12). In 2012, 2013, 2014 and 2016 the St Leonard's College adventure racing team won the national Hillary Challenge, an interschool competition which tests basic outdoor skills and competencies.

== Notable alumni ==
- Kerry Armstrong – actor
- Hamish Blake – comedian, radio presenter
- Kaarin Fairfax – actor, director and singer
- Noni Hazlehurst AO – actor
- Stephanie Hickey – Olympian, Australian snowboard slalom and snowboard cross competitor
- Chris Judd – former professional Australian rules footballer
- Funda Nakkaşoğlu – basketball player
- Geoff Ogilvy – golfer, winner of the 2006 US Open
- Ryan Shelton – comedian
- Mark Turnbull – sailor, gold medal winner at the Sydney 2000 Olympic Games

== See also ==
- List of schools in Victoria
- International Baccalaureate Diploma Programme
