= Dimboola Memorial Secondary College =

Coordinates: 36°26′58.54″S 142°02′02.23″E

- Dimboola, Victoria; Australia

Information
- Type: Public, co-educational, day school
- Motto: Latin: Facta Non Verba (Deeds, Not Words)
- Established: 1924
- Principal: Sally Klinge
- Colours: Blue, red and gold
- Website: www.dmsc.vic.edu.au

Dimboola Memorial Secondary College is a public, co-educational secondary school day school located in Dimboola, Victoria, Australia. It is a small country secondary college with about 200 students and was originally erected as a memorial to those who fought in the First World War. It is located on a hill overlooking Dimboola and the Little Desert. The school's motto is "Facta Non Verba", meaning 'by deeds and not words'. The school is unique in that it is the only purpose-built memorial school in Victoria, and honours Dimboola residents who made the ultimate sacrifice during World War I.

== About the school ==
The majority of the school buildings are from the 1950s, but as part of the Australian Government's Building the Education Revolution project, a new Science and Language Centre and an assembly hall extension with three classrooms/multi-function rooms were built. As part of the Department of Education's FUSE program, artist Michael Shiell worked for 20 days at the college with the Year 9 and 10 students to create ephemeral art works that deepened the students' understanding of their relationship with the environment. This resource includes 3 film clips and 2 Units of Work at Level 6.

== History ==
In 1921 it was decided to build a higher elementary school. A total of £3442 was raised, £3000 was given to the Education Department and £330 was spent on the honour roll now on the library wall. £16 was spent on the flag pole, with the remainder of the money being spent on clearing the thick mallee scrub. The school, now the school and community library, was occupied in May 1924 and officially opened on 2 December. In 1945 it became a high school with the first form 5 (year 11) class. It was renamed Dimboola Memorial High School in 1947.

A sundial was constructed in 1949 as a memorial to Matron Olive Dorothy Paschke, a former student of the school, who died in 1942 during the evacuation of Singapore.

In 1971 the Assembly Hall was opened with a canteen and dining room added in 1981. In 1980 the present administration block opened. The name change to Dimboola Memorial Secondary College took place in 1987.

The school gates are historically important as they are a War Memorial to the memory of ex-students who served in the 1939–1945 War.

== House system ==
The student body is divided into two houses which compete against each other for the annual swimming standards and carnival, athletics standards and carnival and cross-country. The names of these houses are drawn from the local history of the area. Children get put into houses with siblings.

Hindmarsh (blue)
Wimmera (red)

== Facilities ==
DMSC's facilities include a modern science-and-language centre (home to the school's science and German LOTE classes), a hospitality centre joined to the school assembly hall, a community health-and-fitness centre (view Dimboola Health and Fitness Centre externally) and interactive technology facilities in all class rooms and spaces.
