= List of high schools in Melbourne =

This is a list of high schools in Melbourne, Australia.

== A ==
- Academy of Mary Immaculate
- Auburn High School
- Ave Maria College, Melbourne
- Avila College

== B ==
- Bacchus Marsh Grammar
- Balwyn High School
- Bayswater Secondary College
- Beaconhills College
- Belgrave Heights Christian School
- Bentleigh Secondary College
- Berwick Secondary College
- Beth Rivkah Ladies College
- Bialik College
- Billanook College
- Bindjiroo Yaluk Community School
- Blackburn High School
- Boronia Heights College
- Box Forest Secondary College
- Box Hill High School
- Box Hill Senior Secondary College
- Braybrook College
- Brentwood Secondary College
- Brighton Grammar School
- Brighton Secondary College
- Brimbank College
- Broadmeadows Secondary College
- Brunswick Secondary College
- Buckley Park College
- Bundoora Secondary College

== C ==
- Camberwell Girls Grammar School
- Camberwell Grammar School
- Camberwell High School
- Canterbury Girls' Secondary College
- Carey Baptist Grammar School
- Caroline Chisholm Catholic College, Melbourne
- Caroline Springs College
- Carrum Downs Secondary College
- Carey Baptist Grammar School
- Carwatha College, Melbourne
- Catholic Ladies' College
- Catholic Regional College (Sydenham)
- Caulfield Grammar School
- Chandler Secondary College
- Cheltenham Secondary College
- Christian Brothers College
- Cleeland Secondary College
- Coburg High School
- Collingwood College, Victoria
- Coomoora Secondary College
- Copperfield College
- Cornish College
- Craigieburn Secondary College
- Cranbourne Christian College
- Cranbourne Secondary College
- Croydon Secondary College

== D ==
- Dandenong High School
- Darul Ulum College of Victoria
- De La Salle College (Australia)
- Debney Park Secondary College
- Deer Park Secondary College
- Diamond Valley College
- Distance Education Centre, Victoria
- Doncaster Secondary College
- Doveton Secondary College
- Dromana Secondary College

== E ==
- East Doncaster Secondary College
- East Preston Islamic College
- Elisabeth Murdoch College
- Eltham College
- Eltham High School
- Elwood College
- Emerald Secondary College
- Emmanual College (Point Cook)
- Emmaus College
- Epping Secondary College
- Erinbank Secondary College
- Essendon Keilor College
- Eumemmerring College

== F ==
- Fairhills High School
- Fawkner College
- Ferntree Gully College
- Fintona Girls' School
- Firbank Girls' Grammar School
- Fitzroy High School
- Flinders Christian Community College
- Footscray City College
- Forest Hill College
- Fountain Gate Secondary College
- Frankston High School

== G ==
- Galen Catholic College
- Galvin Park Secondary College
- Genazzano FCJ College
- Gilmore College for Girls
- Gilson College
- Gladstone Park Secondary College
- Glen Eira College
- Glen Waverley Secondary College
- Gleneagles Secondary College
- The Grange P-12 College
- Greensborough Secondary College

== H ==
- Haileybury College, Melbourne
- Hampton Park Secondary College
- Harboury school
- Hawthorn Secondary College
- Hays International College
- Healesville High School
- Heathdale Christian College
- Heatherhill Secondary College
- Heatherton Christian College
- Heathmont College
- Highvale Secondary College
- Hillcrest Christian College
- Hillcrest Secondary College
- HollyJoan Secondary College
- Hoppers Crossing Secondary College
- Hume Central Secondary College
- Huntingtower School
- Ἄἴῢὒ

== I ==
- ICA Casey College
- Ilim College of Australia
- Isik College
- The Islamic Schools Of Victoria
- Ivanhoe Girls' Grammar School
- Ivanhoe Grammar School

== J ==
- John Monash Science School
- John Paul College

== K ==
- Kamaruka
- Kambrya College
- Karingal Park Secondary College
- Kealba Secondary College
- Keilor Downs College
- Kew High School
- Keysborough College
- Kilbreda College
- Killester College
- Kilvington Grammar School
- The King David School
- King Khalid Islamic College
- Kingswood College
- The Knox School
- Kolbe Catholic College
- Koonung Secondary College
- Korowa Anglican Girls' School
- Kurunjang Secondary College

== L ==
- La Trobe Secondary College
- Lakeside Secondary College
- Lakeview Senior College
- Lalor North Secondary College
- Lalor Secondary College
- Lauriston Girls' School
- Laverton Secondary College
- Leibler Yavneh College
- Lighthouse Christian College
- Lilydale Adventist Academy
- Lilydale Heights College
- Lilydale High School
- Loreto Mandeville Hall
- Lowther Hall Anglican Grammar School
- Loyola College, Melbourne
- Luther College (Victoria)
- Lyndale Secondary College
- Lyndhurst Secondary College

== M ==
- Mackillop Catholic Regional College
- Macleod College
- Mac.Robertson Girls' High School
- Maranatha Christian School
- Marcellin College
- Marian College (Sunshine West)
- Maribyrnong Secondary College
- Maroondah Secondary College
- Mater Christi College
- Mazenod College
- McClelland Secondary College
- McKinnon Secondary College
- Melbourne Girls' College
- Melbourne Girls' Grammar School
- Melbourne Grammar School
- Melbourne High School
- Melbourne Rudolf Steiner School
- Melton Christian College
- Melton Secondary College
- Mentone Girls' Grammar School
- Mentone Girls' Secondary College
- Mentone Grammar School
- Mercy Diocesan College
- The Meridian International School
- Merrilands College
- Methodist Ladies' College
- Mill Park Secondary College
- Minaret College
- Monash Secondary College
- Monbulk College
- Monterey Secondary College
- Montmorency Secondary College
- Mooroolbark College
- Mordialloc Secondary College
- Mornington Secondary College
- Mount Eliza Secondary College
- Mount Erin College
- Mount Evelyn Christian School
- Mount Lilydale Mercy College
- Mount Scopus Memorial College
- Mount St Joseph Girls' College
- Mount Waverley Secondary College
- Mountain District Christian School
- Mowbray at Brookside
- Mowbray College
- Mullauna College

== N ==
- Narre Warren South College
- Nazareth College, Melbourne
- New Generation College
- Niddrie Secondary College
- Noble Park Secondary College
- Northcote High School
- Northland Secondary College
- Northside Christian College
- Norwood Secondary College
- Nossal High School
- Nunawading Christian College

== O ==
- Oakleigh Greek Orthodox College
- Our Lady of Mercy College
- Our Lady of Sacred Heart College
- Our Lady of Sion College
- Overnewton Anglican Community College
- Oxley College (Chirnside Park, Victoria)
- Ozford College

== P ==
- Padua College, Melbourne
- Pakenham Secondary College
- Parade College
- Parkdale Secondary College
- Parkwood Secondary College
- Pascoe Vale Girls' Secondary College
- Patterson River Secondary College
- Pembroke Secondary College
- The Peninsula School
- Penleigh and Essendon Grammar School
- Penola Catholic College
- Peter Lalor Secondary College
- Plenty Valley Christian College
- Plenty Valley Christian School
- Presbyterian Ladies' College, Melbourne
- Presentation College, Melbourne
- Preshil, The Margaret Lyttle Memorial School
- Preston Girls' Secondary College
- Princes Hill Secondary College

== R ==
- Reservoir District Secondary College
- Ringwood Secondary College
- Rosebud Secondary College
- Rowville Secondary College
- Roxburgh College
- Ruyton Girls' School

== S ==
- Sacré Cœur School
- Sacred Heart College, Oakleigh
- Sacred Heart Girls' College
- Salesian College
- Saltwater P-9 College
- Samaritan Catholic College
- Sandringham College
- Santa Maria College
- Scoresby Secondary College
- Scotch College, Melbourne
- Shelford Anglican Girls' School
- Shelford Girls Grammar School
- Sherbrooke Community School
- Siena College
- Simonds Catholic College
- Sirius College
- Sophia Mundi Steiner School
- South Oakleigh Secondary College
- Southwood Boys' Grammar School
- Springvale Secondary College
- St Albans Secondary College
- St Aloysius' College
- St Andrew's Christian College
- St Anthony's Coptic Orthodox College
- St Bede's College (Mentone)
- St. Bernard's College, Melbourne
- St Catherine's School, Toorak
- St. Columba's College, Melbourne
- St Francis Xavier College, Melbourne
- St Helena Secondary College
- St John's Greek Orthodox College
- St John's Regional College
- St. Joseph's College, Ferntree Gully
- St. Joseph's College, Melbourne
- St. Kevin's College, Melbourne
- St Leonards College
- St Margaret's School, Melbourne
- St Mary's College
- St Mary’s Coptic Orthodox College, Melbourne
- St Michael's Grammar School
- St Monica's College
- St Paul's Anglican Grammar School
- St. Paul's College, Melbourne
- St Peter's College, Cranbourne
- St Thomas Aquinas College
- Star of the Sea College
- Staughton College
- Stott's College
- Strathcona Baptist Girls' Grammar School
- Strathmore Secondary College
- Sunbury College
- Sunbury Downs Secondary College
- Sunshine College
- Sunshine Harvester Technical College
- Swinburne Senior Secondary College
- Sydney Road Community School

== T ==
- Taylors College, Melbourne
- Taylors Lakes Secondary College
- Tarneit Senior College
- Templestowe College
- Thomas Carr College
- Thomastown Secondary College
- Thornbury High School
- Tintern Girls Grammar School
- Toorak College
- Trinity Grammar School, Victoria

== U ==
- University High School, Melbourne
- Upper Yarra Secondary College
- Upwey High School

== V ==
- Vermont Secondary College
- Victoria University Secondary College -Brimbank Campus
- Victoria University Secondary College - Deer Park Campus
- Victorian College for the Deaf
- Victorian College of the Arts Secondary School
- Viewbank College

== W ==
- Wantirna College
- Warrandyte High School
- Waverley Christian College
- Wellington Secondary College
- Werribee Secondary College
- Wesley College, Melbourne
- Wesley Hill College
- Westall Secondary College
- Western Port Secondary College
- Wheelers Hill Secondary College
- Whitefriars College
- Whittlesea Secondary College
- William Ruthven Secondary College
- Williamstown High School
- Woodleigh School

== X ==
- Xavier College

== Y ==
- Yarra Hills Secondary, Mooroolbark
- Yarra Valley Grammar School
- Yeshivah College

== See also ==
- List of schools in Australia
- List of schools in Victoria
- List of high schools in Victoria
