= List of universities and research institutions in Melbourne =

This is a list of universities and research institutes in the Australian city of Melbourne.

== Research institutes ==
- AgriBio
- Australian Regenerative Medicine Institute
- Australian Stem Cell Centre
- Australian Synchrotron
- Baker Heart and Diabetes Institute
- Bio21 Institute
- Brain Research Institute
- Burnet Institute
- Howard Florey Institute
- La Trobe Institute for Molecular Science
- Melbourne Neuropsychiatry Centre
- Murdoch Children's Research Institute
- National Ageing Research Institute
- Peter MacCallum Cancer Centre
- St. Vincent's Institute of Medical Research
- The Peter Doherty Institute for Infection and Immunity
- The Walter and Eliza Hall Institute of Medical Research
- Victorian Institute of Chemical Sciences

== Universities ==
- Australian Institute of Music
- Australian Catholic University
- Deakin University
- La Trobe University
- Monash University
- Royal Melbourne Institute of Technology
- Swinburne University of Technology
- University of Melbourne
- University of Divinity
- Victoria University
- Royal Gurkhas Institute of Technology

== See also ==
- Education in Melbourne
- List of high schools in Melbourne
