= Education in Melbourne =

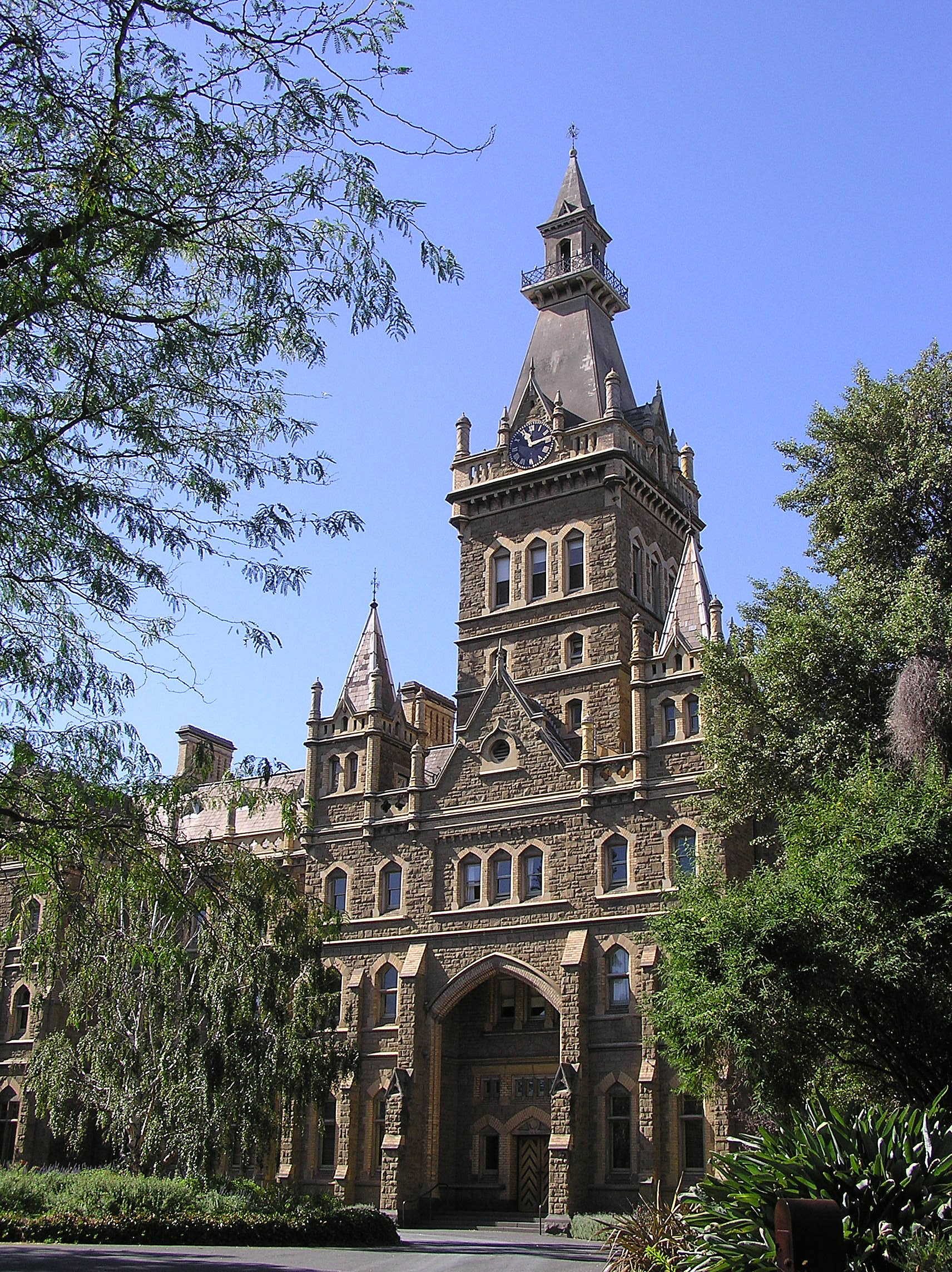
Ormond College, University of Melbourne

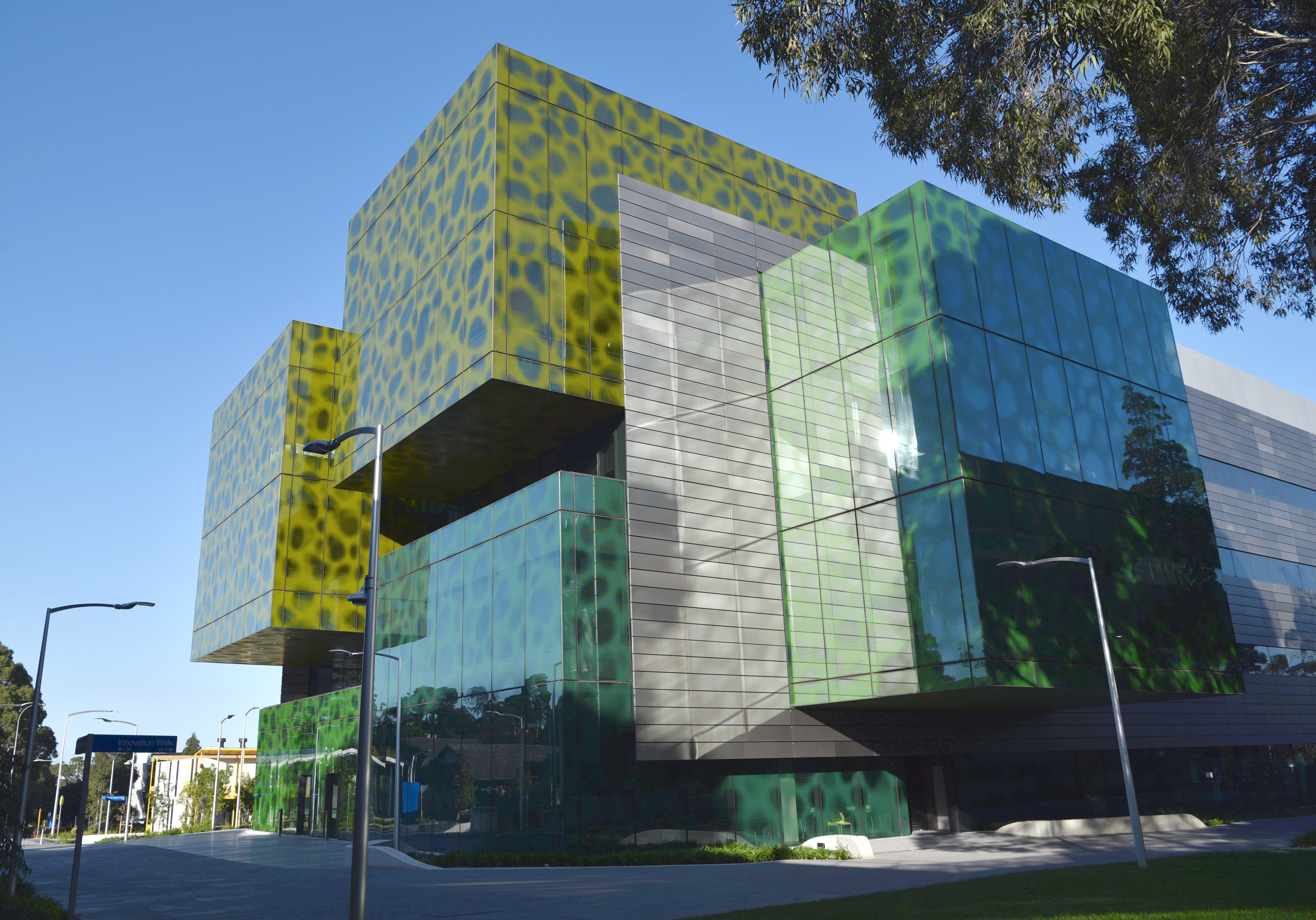
Biomedical Learning and Teaching Building, Monash

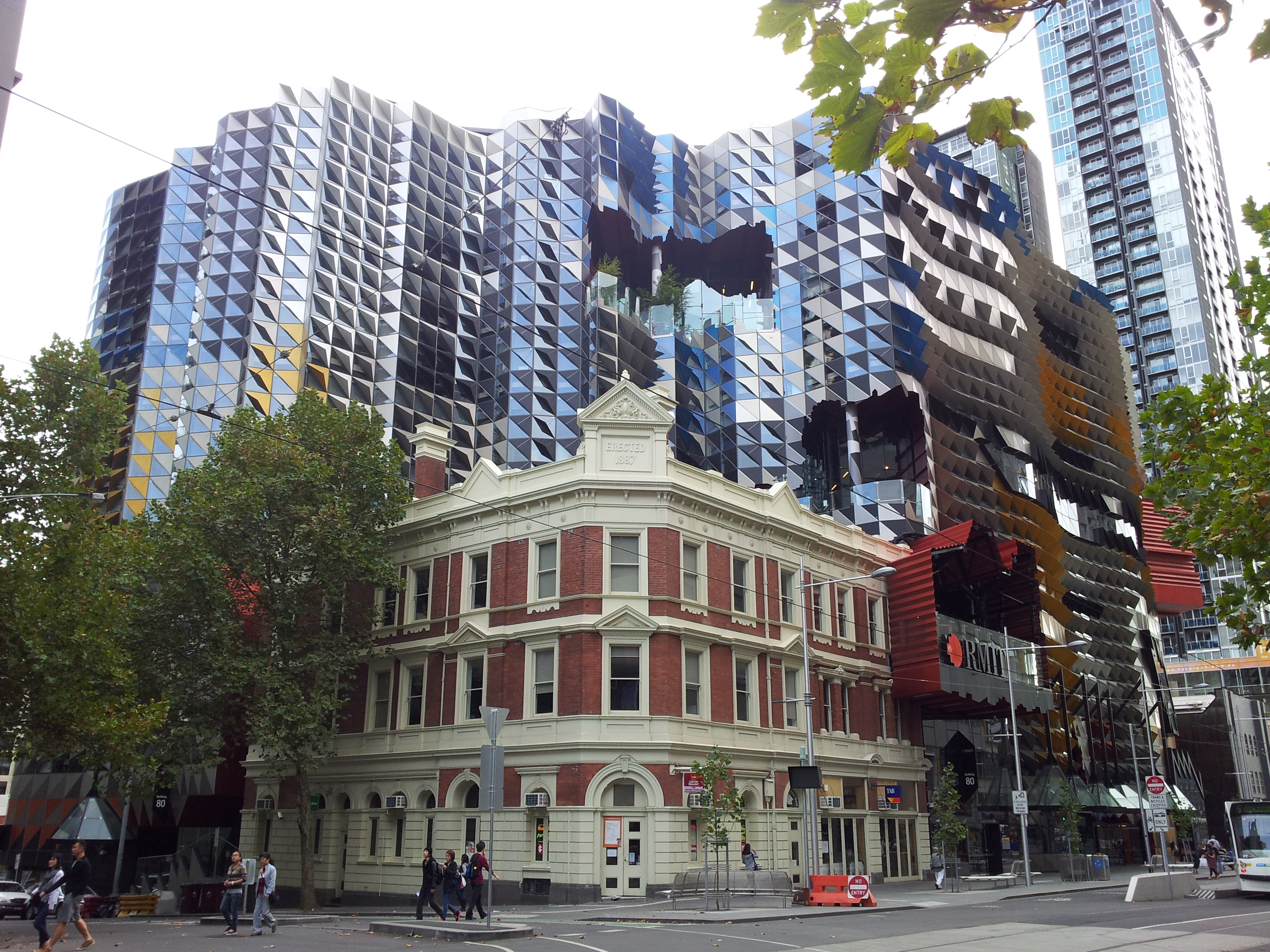
Swanston Academic Building, RMIT

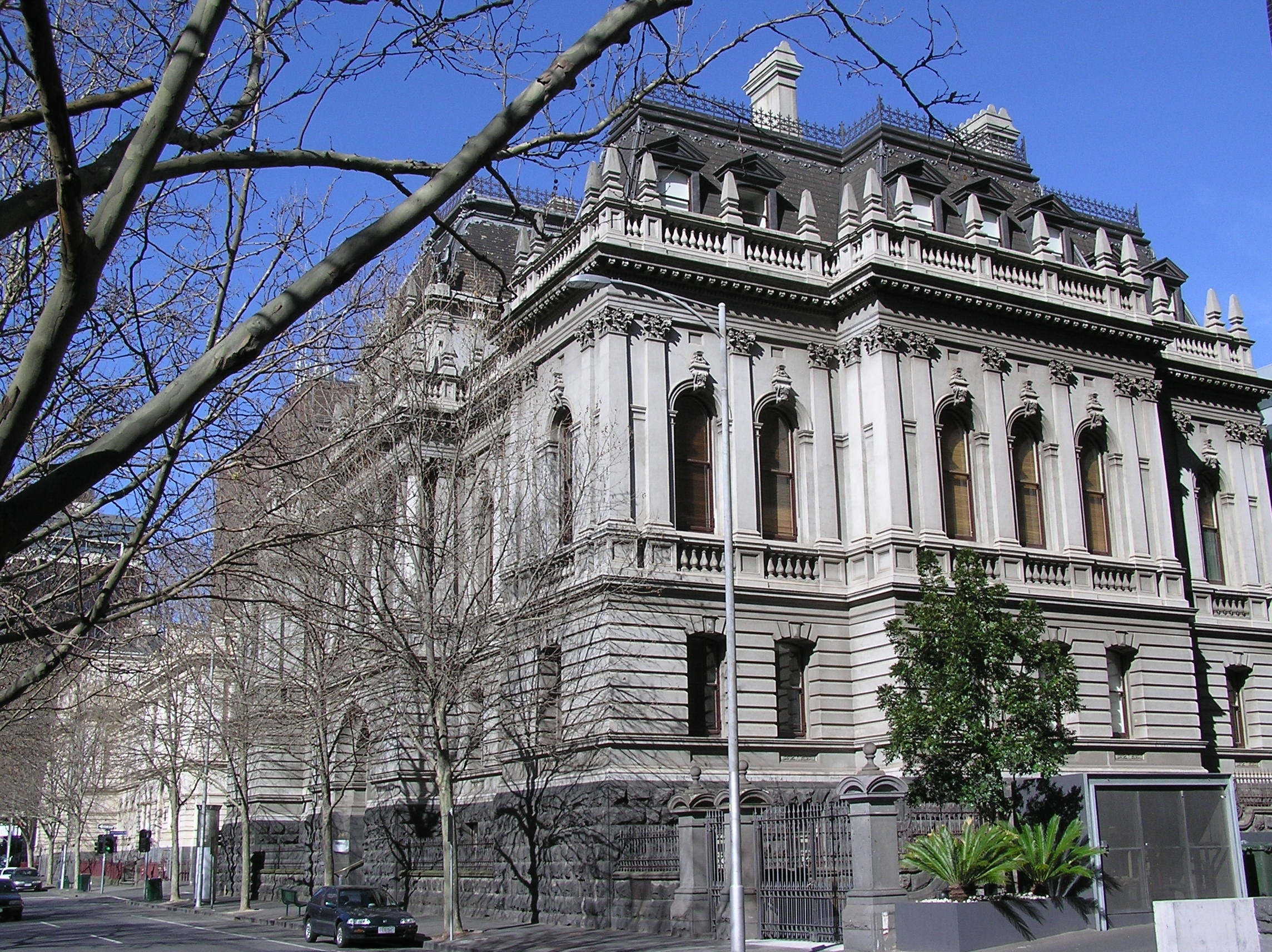
Law Hub, Victoria University

Education in Melbourne may be divided into four groups: pre-school, primary education, secondary education and tertiary education. Melbourne is home to some of Australia's largest university and prominent independent schools. Entry to tertiary education for most students is through the Victorian secondary school system where students are ranked by the Australian Tertiary Admission Rank (ATAR) upon completion of Year 12.

== Tertiary education ==
Melbourne's two largest universities are the University of Melbourne and Monash University, the largest university in Australia. Both are members of the Group of Eight. The largest university campus in Melbourne by size is La Trobe University's Melbourne Campus, located in Bundoora. In 2016, the University of Melbourne was ranked first among Australian universities and the 33rd among universities in the world by the Times Higher Education (THES) international rankings. Furthermore, Monash University was ranked the 74th best university in the world. Due to these high rankings Melbourne was ranked as the world's fourth top university city in 2012 after London, Boston and Tokyo.

Other notable universities in Melbourne include the Royal Melbourne Institute of Technology, La Trobe University and Swinburne University of Technology which have all placed in the THES rankings. The Geelong-based Deakin University has a significant campus in the suburb of Burwood in Melbourne. Victoria University, Australia, has a total of nine campuses across Melbourne's western region, including three in the heart of Melbourne's Central Business District (CBD) and another four within ten kilometres of the CBD. Some of the nation's oldest educational institutions and facilities are located in Melbourne, including the oldest Engineering (1860), Medical (1862), Dental (1897) and Music (1891) schools and the oldest law course in Australia (1857), all at the University of Melbourne. The University of Melbourne is the oldest university in Victoria and the second-oldest university in Australia.

In recent years, the number of international students at Melbourne's universities has risen rapidly, a result of an increasing number of places being made available to full fee paying students.

Institution	Founded	University status	Students	Faculty
University of Melbourne	1853	1853	35,533	3,328
RMIT University	1887	1992	49,476	3,604
Swinburne University of Technology	1908	1992	53,136	1,422
Victoria University	1916	1990	57,154	2,854
Monash University	1958	1958	55,000	8,172
La Trobe University	1964	1964	25,744	2,749
Deakin University	1974	1974	34,616	2,978

== Primary and secondary education ==
Education in the city is overseen by the Victorian Department of Education and Early Childhood Development (DEECD), whose role is to 'provide policy and planning advice for the delivery of education'. It acts as advisor to two state ministers, for Education and for Children and Early Childhood Development.

== See also ==
- List of universities and research institutions in Melbourne
- List of high schools in Melbourne
