= Matthew Haanappel =

Australian Paralympic swimmer

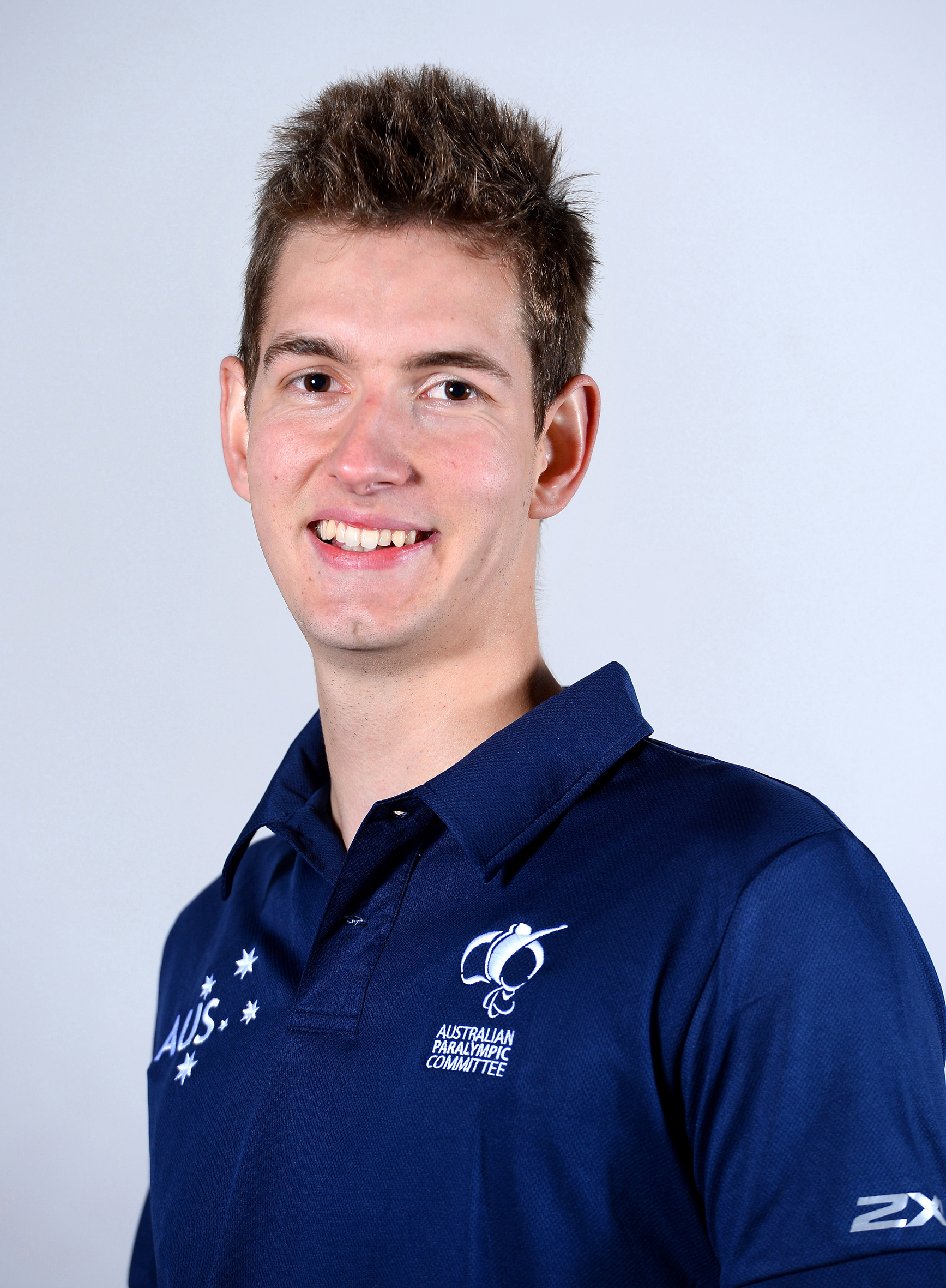
- 2016 Australian Paralympic team portrait of Haanappel

Personal information
- Full name: Matthew Anthony Haanappel
- Nickname: Pineapple
- Nationality: Australia
- Born: 21 May 1994 (age 32) Wantirna, Victoria, Australia
- Height: 1.93 m (6 ft 4 in)
- Weight: 74 kg (163 lb)

Sport
- Sport: Swimming
- Strokes: Freestyle, Backstroke
- Classifications: S6, SB6, SM6
- Club: Camberwell Grammar Aquatic
- Coach: Matthew Belgiovane
Medal record
Men's paralympic swimming
Representing Australia
Event	1st	2nd	3rd
Paralympics Games	1	0	1
World Championships (LC)	0	0	1
Paralympic Pan Pacific Championships	3	2	1
Total	4	2	2
Paralympic Games
Gold medal – first place	2012 London	4×100 m freestyle
Bronze medal – third place	2012 London	4×100 m medley
World Championships (LC)
Bronze medal – third place	2013 Montreal	100 m freestyle S6
Paralympic Pan Pacific Championships
Gold medal – first place	2014 Pasadena	50 m freestyle S6
Gold medal – first place	2014 Pasadena	100 m freestyle S6
Gold medal – first place	2014 Pasadena	200 m medley SM6
Silver medal – second place	2014 Pasadena	50 m butterfly S6
Silver medal – second place	2014 Pasadena	4×50 m medley 20pts
Bronze medal – third place	2014 Pasadena	100 m backstroke S6

Matthew Anthony "Matt" Haanappel, OAM (born 21 May 1994) is an Australian Paralympic swimmer. He was born in Wantirna, Victoria and resides in the far eastern suburbs of Melbourne. He has cerebral palsy right hemiplegia. Haanappel has represented Australia at the 2012 Summer Paralympics, the 2013 IPC Swimming World Championships, the 2014 Pan Pacific Para Swimming Championships, the 2016 Summer Paralympics, and the 2018 Commonwealth Games. He represents the Camberwell Grammar School Aquatic club.

== Personal ==
Haanappel was born on 21 May 1994, with cerebral palsy right hemiplegia as a result of a prenatal stroke. His disability severely impairs his fine motor skills and dexterity due to the spasticity in his right hand. Matthew attended the Cerebral Palsy Education Centre in Melbourne as a child, and is now an ambassador of the organisation.

Haanappel comes from a family with a strong sporting background. His father Shane is an Australian basketball representative, his brother Adam is an international tennis player, and he is the cousin of retired cyclist Cadel Evans. Haanappel was a student at Croydon Secondary College from 2008 to 2011. During 2012, he deferred his VCE to spend more time training. In 2013, he returned to study at Melba College to complete his VCE.

Haanappel is also an ambassador and advocate for Sport in Victoria, which promotes physical activity and sporting excellence through students in public schools within Victoria.

== Swimming ==
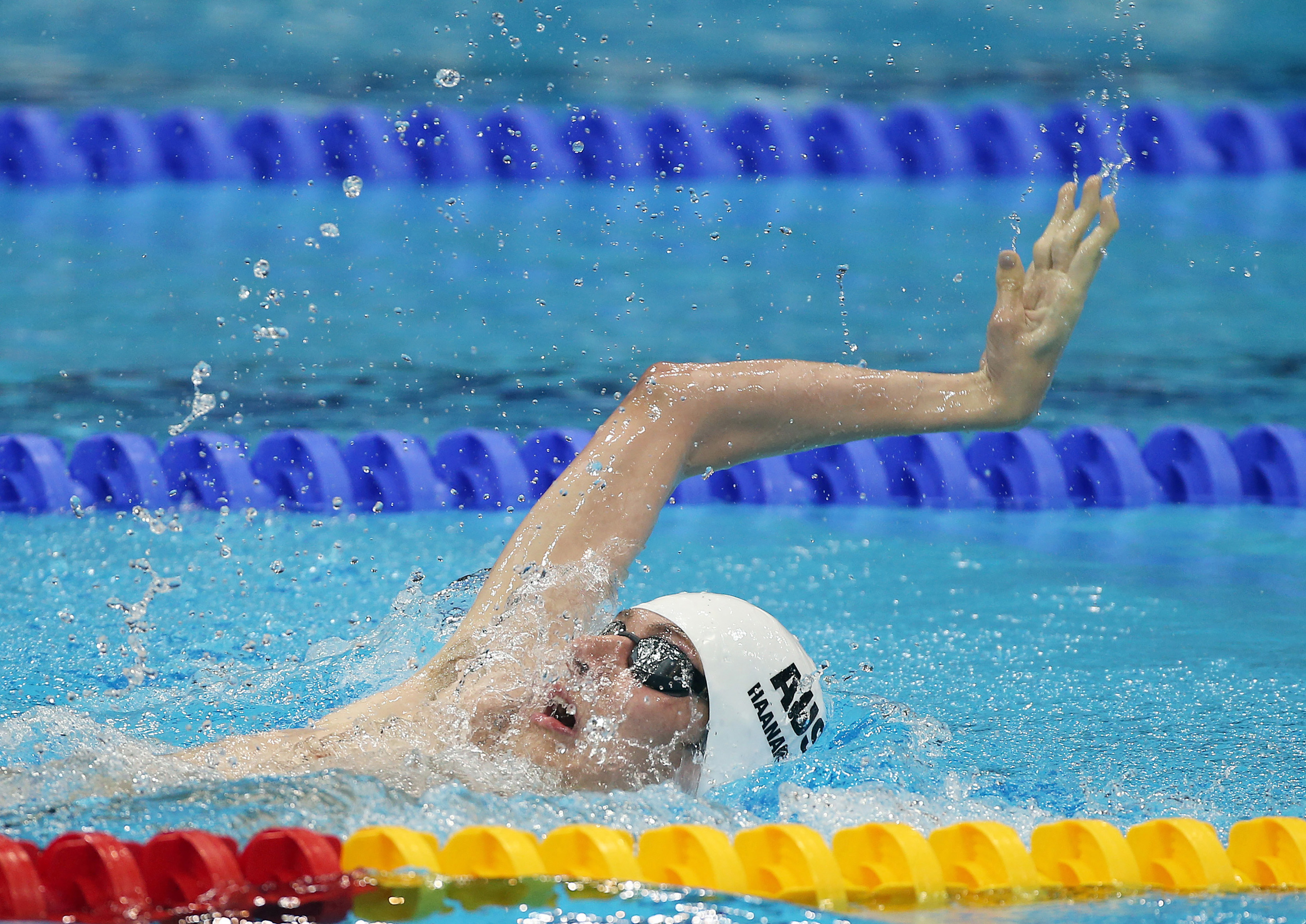
Haanappel at the 2012 London Paralympics

Haanappel is an S6 classified swimmer competing in 50m freestyle, 100m freestyle, 50m butterfly, 100m backstroke, 100m breaststroke and 200m individual medley. He was reclassified in early 2012, having previously competed in S7 events.

He is a full-time member of the Paralympic Swimming Program at the Victorian Institute of Sport, and is also a member of the Camberwell Grammar Aquatic Club when he trains in Melbourne.

Haanappel continues to mentor young swimmers at Lilydale Swimming Club. Internationally, he mostly competes against competitors in his own classification, but domestically he competes against swimmers in all disability classes and sometimes against able bodied swimmers in club and state level competitions.

=== 2005 ===
Haanappel started swimming in 2005 at the Lilydale Swimming Club. First coached by Swimming Victoria SWD Head Coach Karen Garrard and also the club's junior level coach Anne Longridge. He competed at his first competition, the 2005 Victorian Primary School Swimming Championships where he false started at his first ever race.

=== 2006 ===
At age 13, Matthew put his swimming on hold to move with his family to Port Vila, Vanuatu. During this time he took up wheelchair tennis through the Vanuatu Paralympic Committee. Haanappel attended the Port Vila International School.

=== 2007 ===
Haanappel returned to Australia late in 2007.

=== 2008 ===
Midway through 2008, Haanappel decided to rejoin the Lilydale Swimming Club under his old coach Anne Longridge, but after a short period was promoted to the Junior and Senior State Squad under the instruction of Neil and Michael Davis. Haanappel was selected to represent Victoria at the 2008 Pacific School Games in Canberra, receiving silver and bronze medals.

=== 2009 ===
In 2009, Haanappel broke Australian Age Disability Records with Swimming Australia. Haanappel was selected as the Victorian representative for the School Sport Australia Swimming Championships. Subsequently, Haanappel switched coaches to Lawrence Krauter at Lilydale Swimming Club.

=== 2010 ===
Haanappel competed in his first national championship in 2010 and was selected for the Australian Youth Team. At his first international trip at the 2010 Internationale Deutsche Meisterschaften in Berlin, he earned a silver medal in the 50 m Youth Butterfly. Haanappel moved in late 2010 to the Nunawading Swimming Club to join Amanda Isaac and Rohan Taylor at the club's Victorian Institute of Sport High Performance Program.

=== 2011 ===
As an Age competitor he had three first-place finishes, two second-place finishes and three third-place finishes at the 2011 National Age Multi-Class Championships. He travelled to Germany for his second Internationale Deutsche Meisterschaften in Berlin, achieving three gold medals.

=== 2012 ===
In early 2012 prior to the Paralympic Selection Trials, Haanappel trained at the United States Olympic Training Center in Colorado Springs alongside Michael Phelps. Haanappel swam at the 2012 Paralympic Trials, achieving three priority two selection times for the 2012 Team.

He was selected for his fourth Victoria School Swimming Team in 2012, and was selected to the position of male team captain for the championships. Haanappel was the first AWD student to have held the role of Male Captain.

In June 2012, Matthew was selected to represent Australia at the 2012 Summer Paralympics in the 200m individual medley, 100m freestyle, 100m backstroke, 50m butterfly, the 50m freestyle events. Going into the London Games, he was ranked fourth in the world in the 50 metre freestyle event and third in the 200 metre individual medley. His training for the 2012 London Paralympics included pilates, gym sessions, pool training, and a relay training camp at the Australian Institute of Sport.

At the 2012 Summer Paralympics he won a gold medal in the Men's 4 × 100 m Freestyle Relay (34 points) and a bronze in the Men's 4 × 100 m Medley Relay (34 points).

Towards the end of 2012, after a break from training, Haanappel returned under the coaching of Jonathan Shaw at the University of the Sunshine Coast.

=== 2013 ===
In 2013, Haanappel continued training at the University of the Sunshine Coast through to May when he returned to Melbourne and trained at the DVE Aquatic Club, under the instruction of Brian Miller (coach to the Australian team for the 2011 Pan Pacific Para Swimming Championships).

Haanappel was selected to the Australian Paralympic Swim Team to compete at the 2013 IPC Swimming World Championships in Montreal. He won a bronze medal in the Men's 100 m Freestyle S6. In October, Haanappel moved to the Norwood Swimming Club in Adelaide to help grow a Paralympic Swimming Program at the club.

=== 2014 ===
In 2014, Haanappel moved to the Australian Institute of Sport in Canberra to join the Swimming Australia National Training Centre. He was selected to the Australian Teams attending the Brazilian National Championships and the Pan Pacific Para Swimming Championships, where he won three Gold, two Silver and one Bronze medal.

After the Paralympic Pan Pacific Championships, Haanappel returned to Melbourne to undergo surgery on his left shoulder. He did not swim the end of year's National Short Course Championships.

=== 2015 ===
As of 2015, Haanappel was listed as a supported athlete at the Australian Institute of Sport under Yuriy Vdovychenko, who trains in Melbourne with Ringwood Swimming Club.

=== 2016 ===
Haanappel contested the 2016 Australian Swimming Championships incorporating the 2016 Australian Paralympic Team Trials. He swam 50m and 100m in both Freestyle and Backstroke. He was selected to the Australian Dolphins National Swim Team and listed as an emergency for the 2016 Australian Paralympic Team. Haanappel was called up for formal selection in the 2016 Australian Paralympic Team in August after a nominated athlete was withdrawn. He was then assigned to Swimming Victoria State Team Coach, Michal Skrodzki for his preparation towards the Rio Games.

At the 2016 Rio Paralympics, Haanappel competed in five events. He placed sixth in Mixed 4 x 50m Freestyle (20 points), sixth in 100m Freestyle S6 and fifth in Men's 50m Freestyle S6. Before the Rio Paralympics, Haanappel said that he hoped to inspire others and "show everyone that people with disabilities can achieve things".

=== 2018 ===
Haanappel competed at the 2018 Commonwealth Games in the 50 metre Freestyle S7, placing 6th. He then trained at Camberwell Grammar Aquatic under Matthew Belgiovane.

== Recognition ==
- 2008: School Sport Victoria AWD Award
- 2010: Leader Junior Sports Star Encouragement Award
- 2012: Leader Senior Sports Star of the Year
- 2012: School Sport Victoria Swimming Award
- 2012: School Sport Victoria Outstanding Sporting Achievement Award
- 2012: Victorian Young Achievers Award for Sporting Excellence
- 2014: Order of Australia Medal following London 2012 Paralympic Games

== Personal bests ==
Course	Event	Time	Meet	Swim Date	Reference
Long	50m Backstroke	37.55 OC	2014 Victorian Swimming Championships	17-Jan-14	
Long	100m Backstroke	01:20.14 OC	2014 NSW Open Championships	1-Mar-14	
Long	50m Breaststroke	44.15	School Sport Australia Swimming Championships	2-Aug-11	
Long	100m Breaststroke	01:36.39	2013 IPC World Swimming Championships	11-Aug-13	
Long	50m Butterfly	33.81	2014 Paralympic Pan Pacific Championships	6-Aug-14	
Long	100m Butterfly	01:17.78	2010 Swimming Victoria Qualifying Meet Week 2	21-Nov-10	
Long	50m Freestyle	30.77 OC	2016 Rio Paralympic Games	10-Sept-16	
Long	100m Freestyle	01:08.12 OC	AIS Paralympic Swimming Time Trials	26-Jun-14	
Long	200m Freestyle	02:37.17 OC	2014 South Australian Swimming Championships	19-Dec-13	
Long	400m Freestyle	05:32.8	2010 Swimming Victoria Long Course Distance Meet	6-Nov-10	
Long	200m Medley	02:55.6 OC	2012 London Paralympic Games	6-Sept-12	
Short	50m Backstroke	37.36 OC	Eltham SC 11th Annual Short Course	15-Aug-10	
Short	100m Backstroke	01:19.98 OC	2013 Australian Short Course Championships	23-Aug-13	
Short	50m Breaststroke	42.91 OC	Melbourne Vicentre Urban Shortcourse Meet	29-May-11	
Short	100m Breaststroke	01:34.66 OC	Melbourne Vicentre Urban Shortcourse Meet	29-May-11	
Short	50m Butterfly	34.83 OC	2011 ascta(V)/FAS Short Course Nationals Hit Out	11-Jun-11	
Short	100m Butterfly	01:18.36	2011 Australian Short Course Championships	2-Jul-11	
Short	50m Freestyle	30.31 OC	2014 Swimming Australia Grand Prix 3	16-Jul-14	
Short	100m Freestyle	01:07.6 OC	2014 Swimming Australia Grand Prix 3	16-July-14	
Short	200m Freestyle	02:44.3 OC	Eltham SC 11th Annual Short Course Meet	15-Aug-10	
Short	400m Freestyle	05:52.1 OC	Melbourne Vicentre June Shortcourse Meet	26-Jun-10	
Short	200m Medley	02:51.94 OC	CA Tritons 2012 SC Meet	24-Jun-12	
