= Mowbray College =

- Kurunjang, Victoria; Australia

Information
- Type: Independent, co-educational, day school
- Motto: We Learn And Grow
- Established: 1983
- Founder: Alan Patterson
- Closed: 22 June 2012
- Principal: David Robertson (acting)
- Staff: ~200
- Enrolment: <1000
- Colours: Maroon and navy blue

Mowbray College was an independent, selective, co-educational day school, located in Kurunjang, Victoria and Caroline Springs, Victoria, Australia.

The school had three campuses. The Patterson campus, located at Kurunjang, taught students from preschool to Year Twelve. The Brookside and Town Centre campuses were both located in Caroline Springs. The Brookside campus was used for students in pre-school to Year Six, while Town Centre was for secondary students (Years Seven to Twelve). The Brookside campus was located at the Brookside Learning Centre, which hosted common facilities (such as administration facilities, library, gymnasium, arts rooms, and science rooms) shared by Mowbray, the Brookside campus of Caroline Springs College and Christ the Priest Catholic Primary School.

Mowbray College was an International Baccalaureate school, having offered the IB Primary Years Programme and IB Middle Years Programme since the end of 2007, and the IB Diploma Programme since May 2008.

Mowbray was one of thirteen Australian participants in the Round Square Conference of Schools. On 28 May 2012, college board chairperson, Tracey MacKenzie, told a meeting of parents, staff and students that the college had debts of more than $18 million and that emergency funding of $4 million was needed to allow the college to operate until the end of the year, or the board would have to consider entering into voluntary administration. Subsequently, the school did go into voluntary administration on 30 May 2012.

On 2 June 2012, the administrators announced that the school would be closed on 6 June for all students except those currently studying VCE or International Baccalaureate subjects. A grant of $1 million from the State Government would allow those students to continue at the school until the end of second term on 22 June.

On 15 October 2012, it was announced that the three closed campuses had been sold. Heathdale Christian College in Werribee bought the Kurunjang site for an undisclosed sum, the Caroline Springs town centre campus was bought for $6.7 million by Intaj Khan, the chief executive of the Western Institute of Technology, and Grace Children's Services bought the Brookside campus for $3.3 million.

== See also ==
- List of high schools in Victoria
- Victorian Certificate of Education
