= Kerri Judd =

Australian lawyer

Kerri Judd KC (born 1966) is an Australian lawyer who has been a judge of the Supreme Court of Victoria since 17 September 2024. She was previously the Director of Public Prosecutions for the state of Victoria from 2018 to 2024, the first woman to be appointed to the role.

== Early life and education ==
Judd attended Croydon Secondary College, a public high school from which no student had previously been accepted to study law. When Judd told a careers teacher she wanted to become a lawyer, she was told not to waste her time. She studied at the University of Melbourne, graduating with a Bachelor of Laws in 1987 and a Master of Laws in 1995.

== Career ==
Judd was admitted to practice in law 1989 and worked as a judge's associate for Supreme Court judges Ian Gray and William Crockett, before joining the bar in 1991. She managed a legal office for indigenous people in Alice Springs in the 1990s.

Judd was appointed Senior Counsel in November 2007 and Senior Crown Prosecutor in 2016. Judd represented Victoria at the Royal Commission into the Black Saturday bushfires and the Royal Commission into Institutional Responses to Child Sexual Abuse. She appeared in the case of Akon Guode, a mother who drove her four children into a lake, as well as the rape and murder of Bega schoolgirls Lauren Barry and Nichole Collins. From December 2017, she was acting Chief Crown Prosecutor.

In March 2018, it was announced that Judd would become Victoria's next Director of Public Prosecutions after John Champion was appointed to the Supreme Court. The DPP is the head of the state's public prosecutions service, responsible for prosecuting indictable offences. She is the first woman to be appointed to the role. On her appointment, she said "I would love to think that we’re getting to a point in time where appointing a woman to something like this is unremarkable, but I recognise that it is remarkable at the moment. So, I am very proud and I hope that I will be a role model."

In November 2018, Judd prosecuted Melbourne car rampage accused Dimitrious Gargasoulas. In 2019, she prosecuted George Pell for historic child sex offences. After a nationwide suppression order was imposed during the case, Judd charged over sixty journalists, publishers and broadcasters, including the Herald Sun, The Age, News Corp, Nine Network and the ABC with contempt of court. Most of the charges were later dropped. In March 2020, Judd represented the state in Pell's successful appeal to the High Court against his conviction.
