= Sacred Heart Girls' College =

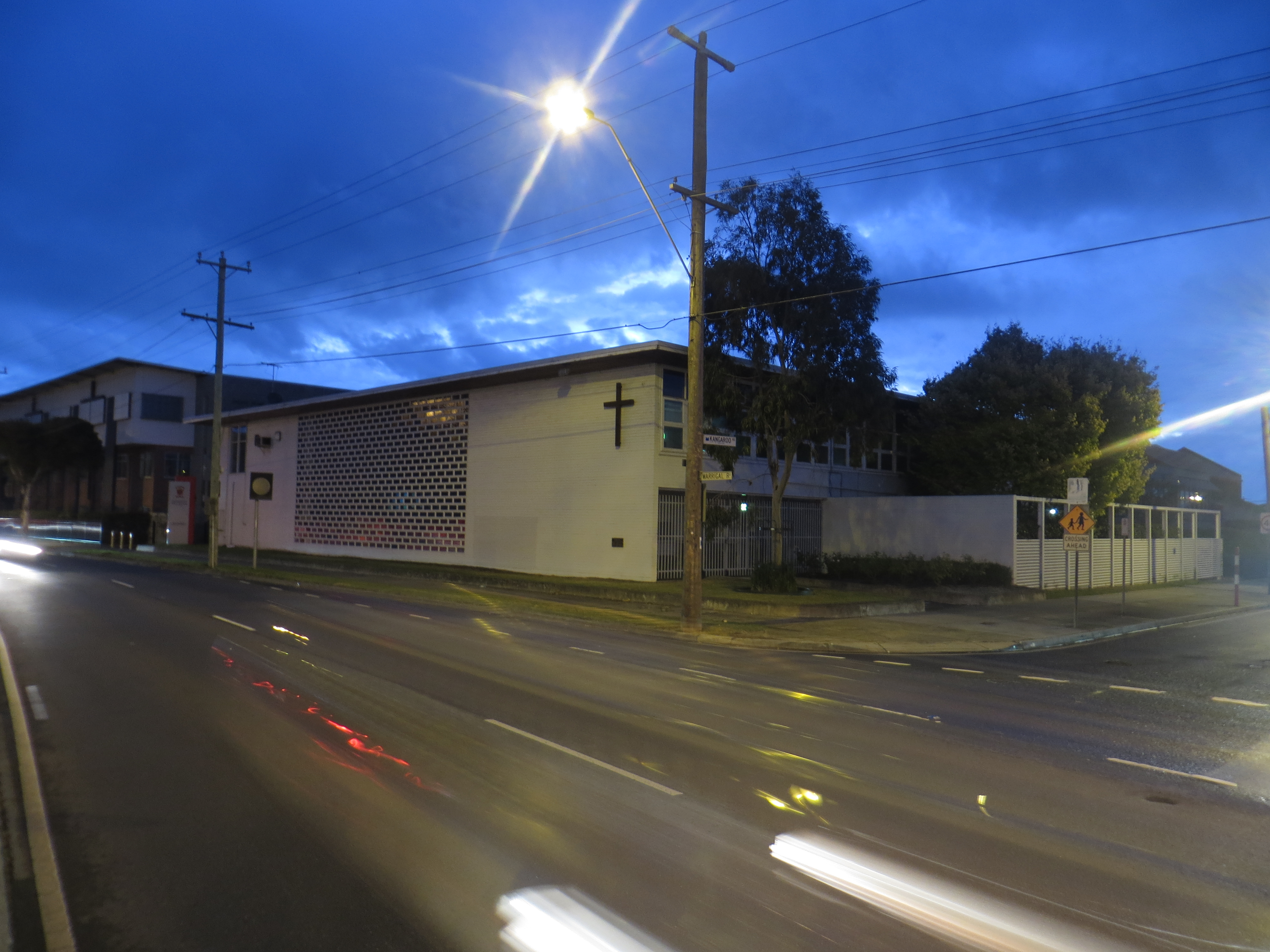
- Sacred Heart Girls' College, in 2013

Location
- 113 Warrigal Road; Oakleigh, Melbourne, Victoria, 3166; Australia; 37°54′6″S 145°5′10″E

Information
- School type: Independent secondary school
- Motto: Semper Superne Nitens (Always Striving Upwards)
- Religious affiliation: Roman Catholic
- Opened: 1957; 69 years ago
- Founder: Euphrasie Barbier
- Principal: Julie Swanson
- Years offered: 7–12
- Gender: Girls
- Enrolment: 1000
- Houses: Bede, Paul, Trinity, Xavier
- Website: shgc.vic.edu.au

Sacred Heart Girls' College (SHGC) is an independent Roman Catholic secondary school for girls from years 7 to 12 located in the Melbourne south-eastern suburb of Oakleigh, in Victoria, Australia. It was opened in 1957 by the Sisters of Our Lady of the Missions. The College houses approximately 1000 students.

The school is affiliated with the Alliance of Girls' Schools Australasia (AGSA), as well as the South Eastern Sporting Group (SESG) and the Secondary Catholic Sporting Association (SCSA).

The school offers the Victorian Certificate of Education (VCE), and consistently ranks in the Top 100 schools in Victoria for VCE, as well as in the Top 10 Catholic schools in Victoria for VCE.

== History ==
Sacred Heart Girls' College was founded by the Sisters of Our Lady of the Missions in 1957. In 2017, the school celebrated its 60the anniversary. In 2022, the school celebrated 65 years of educating young women at their current Warrigal Road campus.

== Academics ==
The school is one of 100-odd schools in Australia to teach Indonesian as a second language.

== House teams ==
Inter-house competitions remain an integral part of the College's ethos. The four houses with their associated colours are:

- Trinity (Blue)
- Xavier (Green)
- Paul (Gold)
- Bede (Red)

The names for the houses were derived from the traditions and heritage of the Sisters of Our Lady of the Missions. The students are placed into one of the houses upon starting at the college.

The house teams participate in sporting events, such as annual swimming carnivals, athletics carnivals and house netball & cross country competitions. The houses also participate in a house arts festival, in which each house exhibits performances relating to song, dance and acting for the college.

=== Bede ===
The Bede House colour is red. Bede House was named in honour of Mother Mary St. Bede. She was a pioneer member of the congregation in England and a great educator who gave constant encouragement to the Sisters during their difficult years when establishing a school in Western Australia.

=== Paul ===
The Paul House colour is gold. Paul House was named in honour of Paul the Apostle. He was fired with great missionary spirit and used sporting examples as a picture of the Christian life. In 1 Corinthians 9:24–26, he challenges us not just to race, but to race to win, saying, "Do you not know that in a race all the runners run, but only one receives the prize? So run that you may obtain it. Every athlete exercises self-control in all things. They do it to receive a perishable wreath, but we an imperishable. So I do not run aimlessly; I do not box as one beating the air."

=== Trinity ===
The Trinity House colour is blue. Trinity House is named in honour to the Trinity: the doctrine of God as three divine persons: the Father, the Son (Jesus Christ), and the Holy Spirit. Together, they represent grace and creation and are a symbol for harmony and teamwork.

=== Xavier ===
The Xavier House colour is emerald green. Xavier House was named in honour of Francis Xavier by Sister Mary Clement who was a sports mistress. The missionary Francis Xavier had three virtues: a great desire to bring souls to the Sacred Heart of Jesus, an heroic obedience, and a great spirit of sacrifice. He is the patron of missionaries in foreign lands, and of Australia, China, India, Indonesia, Mongolia, New Zealand and Pakistan.

== Notable alumni ==
- Faustina "Fuzzy" Agolley – Video Hits host
- Gabriella Cilmi – ARIA Music Award winner, singer-songwriter
- Samantha Downie – third-place winner of Australia's Next Top Model, Cycle 4
- Elise Haggerty, softball player, Australian U-15 Women's World Cup Team

== See also ==
- Sacred Heart Girls' College building, Oakleigh, designed by Frederick Romberg
- List of non-government schools in Victoria, Australia
- List of high schools in Melbourne
