= Sacred Heart Girls' College building, Oakleigh =

Sacred Heart Girls' College building
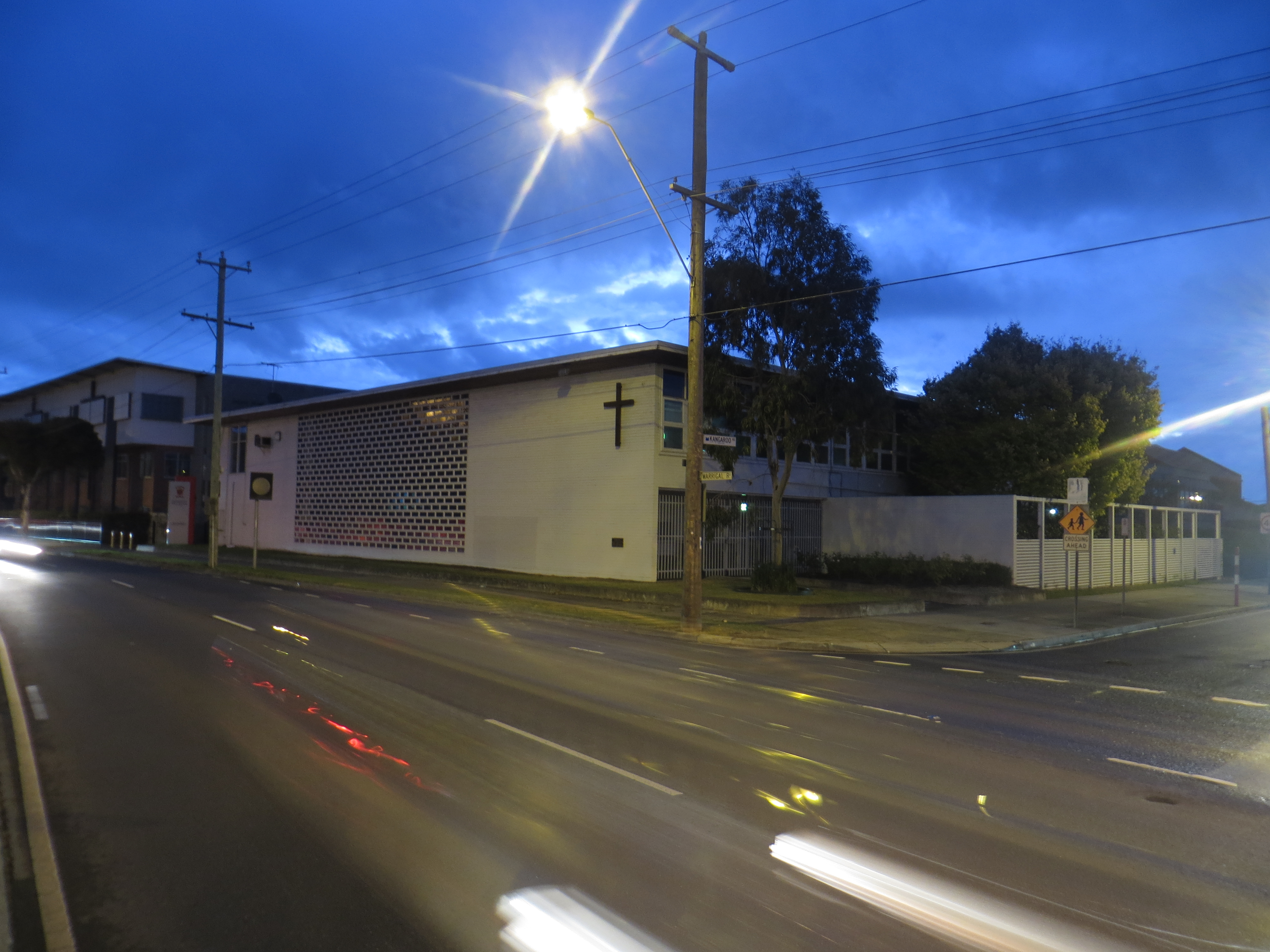
- Sacred Heart Girls' College building, in 2013
- Interactive map of the Sacred Heart Girls' College building area
- Etymology: Sacred Heart Girls' College

General information
- Status: Completed
- Type: School building
- Architectural style: Modernism
- Location: 113 Warrigal Road, Oakleigh, Melbourne, Victoria, Australia
- Coordinates: 37°54′05″S 145°05′11″E
- Completed: 1954
- Owner: Sacred Heart Girls' College

Technical details
- Floor count: 2

Design and construction
- Architect: Frederick Romberg

The Sacred Heart Girls' College building is a modern architecture building designed by Frederick Romberg that is used as an educational facility by Sacred Heart Girls' College. The building is positioned on the corner of Warrigal Road and Kangaroo Road, Oakleigh in one of Melbourne's eastern suburbs, in Victoria, Australia. Completed in 1954, this building is a fine example of the modern architectural style. The site was purchased from the Sacred Heart Parish in 1955, established the foundations of the girls' school which would open its doors to its 95 students in 1957.

== Description ==
The large cream-coloured façade acts as the solid feature to the flow to the Warrigal Road traffic, which also blends into the fabric of the adjacent brick domestic housing. A pattern of rectangular opaque coloured glazing (which alludes to medieval precedent) is embedded into the brick façade which act as soft light walls for the interior classrooms, which help complement the solid steel structure exposed on both exterior and interior. Above the wall are timber slats which line the under-side of the ceiling on the exterior. The steel structures are notably evident primarily in the courtyard; pilotis which support sections of the first level thus allowing more space and movement below. These columns create a sense of internal colonnade within the space. The square plan provides many spatial and environmental qualities to the building; a 360° view of adjacent classrooms, a divide between the noise of the constant traffic on Warrigal Road and the students within, in an attempt to establish quietness and seclusion, and allowing sun and air to enter through the void which circulates into the classrooms. The two rows of small rectangular windows on the first floor also allow for such circulation, which are precedent of early Renaissance Florentine palazzo, a building form that Romberg admired. The square plan not only echoes in the fenestration, but also in the checked pattern on the courtyard pavement. The initial design of five classrooms in the building was allocated at the first floor (which was to accommodate for only 150 students).

== Key influences and design approach ==
There is contention over the origins of Romberg’s inspiration for the plan of Sacred Heart. Geometric formalism was rife during the 1950s. Romberg’s student work demonstrates an early partiality for geometric form. During his partnership with Grounds this interest was intensified. Sacred Heart can be seen as a development of the Grounds Hill Street house. Where Grounds simplified the architectural form thus reducing its meaning Romberg focused on instilling an intense connection with the past through form and materiality. The building establishes Romberg’s curiosity in medieval and classical form which is further developed in his later institutional architecture.

== Alterations ==
The school has gone through many changes and redevelopment from its initial build in 1957. Suffering a fire in 1982 and expansion, the need to join class to Salesian College was needed. In 1983, the students would return to the school with running classrooms and a familiar schooling environment. A redevelopment of the master plan for the school was conducted in 1998 to accommodate for the expanding number of student enrolments. As new buildings were added, new facilities followed. The Romberg building (known as the “Boyd” building within the school community) has also followed the alterations. The courtyard space has been overlaid and shelters a fitness space for students whilst the upper floor classrooms remain as functional classrooms for such curriculum such as arts and music. A set of stairs which was initially located in the courtyard have been relocated to the west of the exterior of the Romberg building, still allowing for access to the upper level. The cream brick wall and opaque coloured windows remain as the solid icon of the school on the main street frontage, supported by a cross which highlights the school's religious background.

The building went under construction in late 2013 early 2014, and now has a fully functioning dance studio and viewing room with a stage on the bottom level and a series of music rooms on the second level.

== Gallery ==
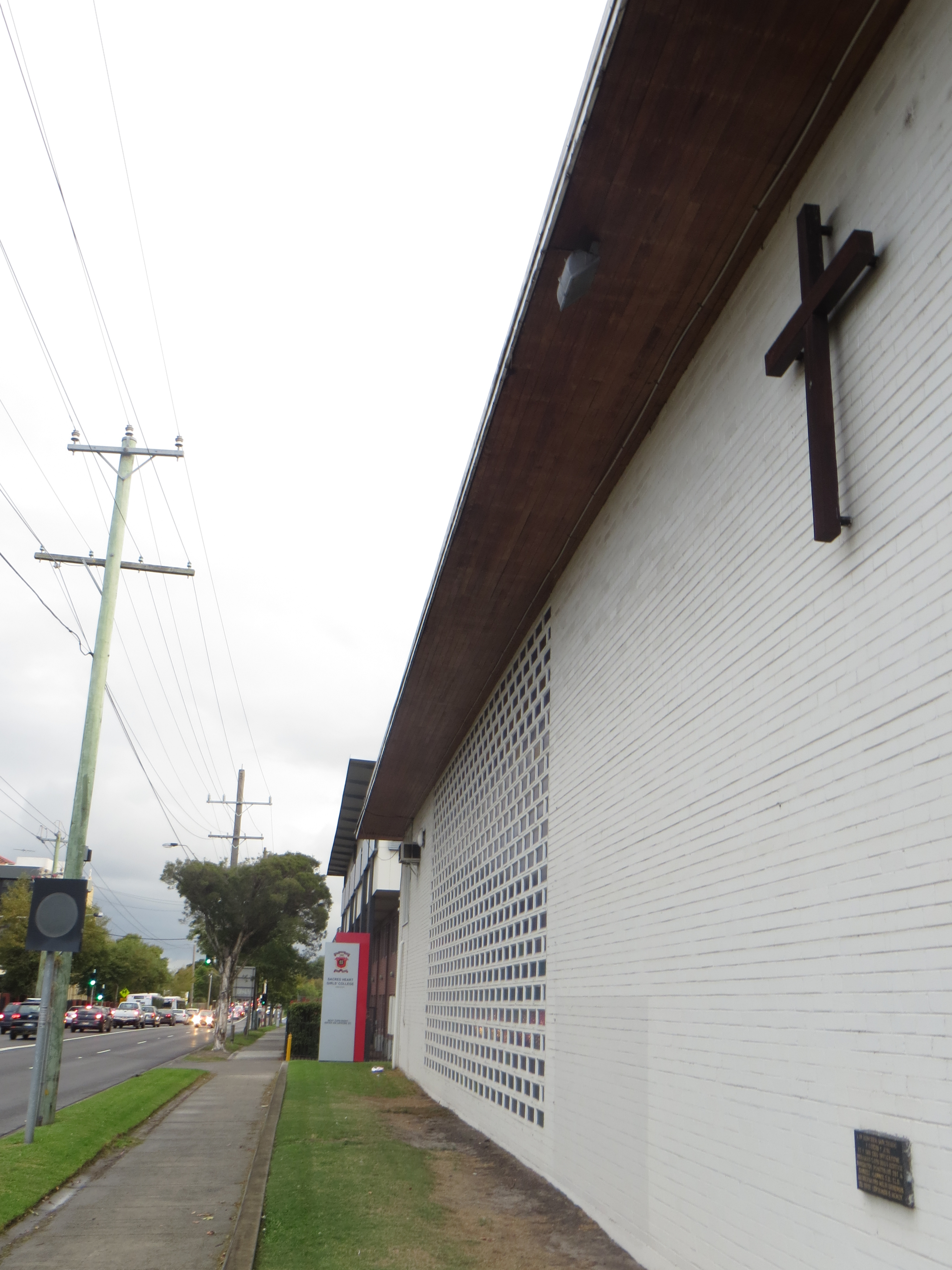
Exterior wall of school

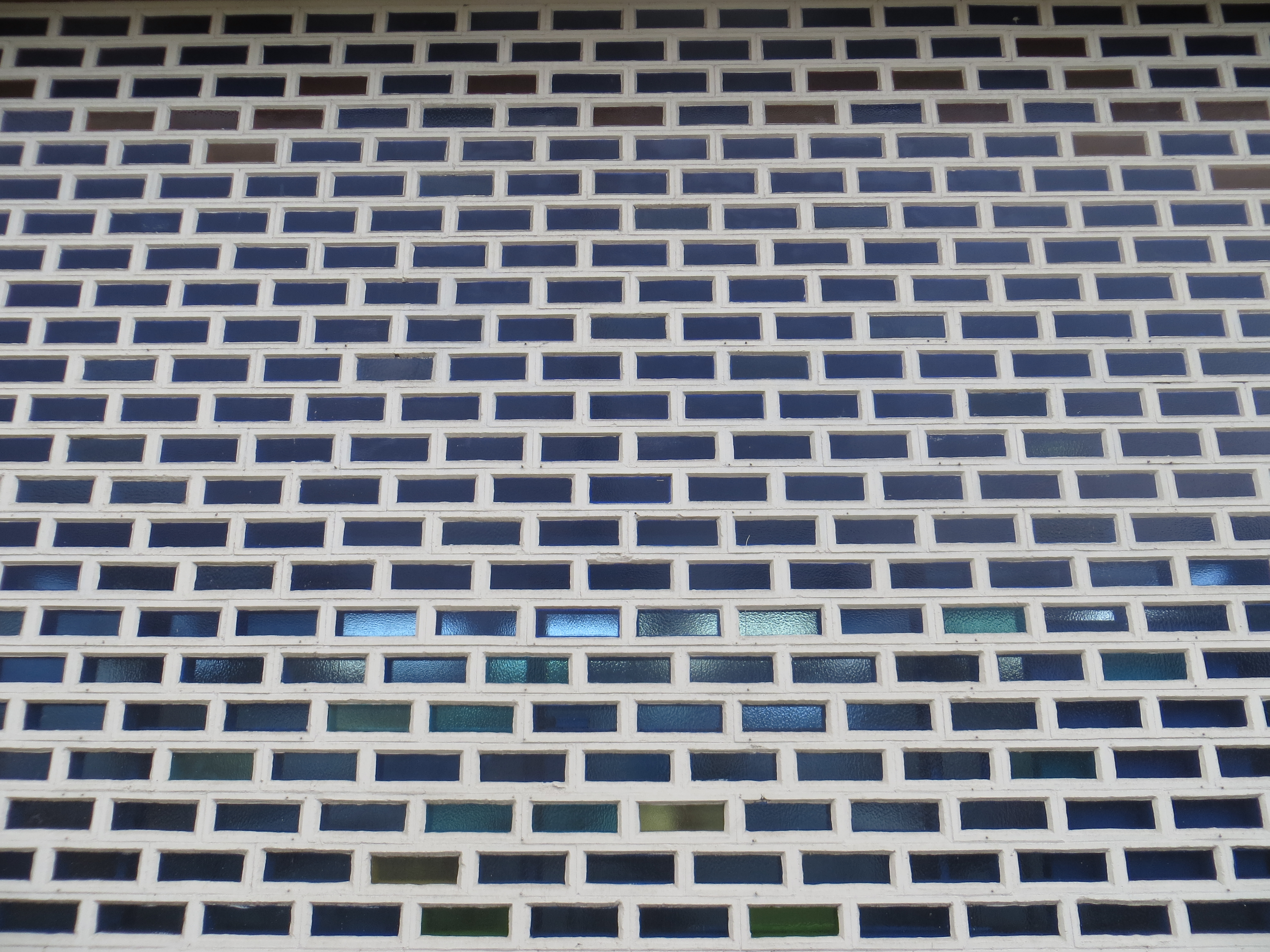
Coloured Opaque Window

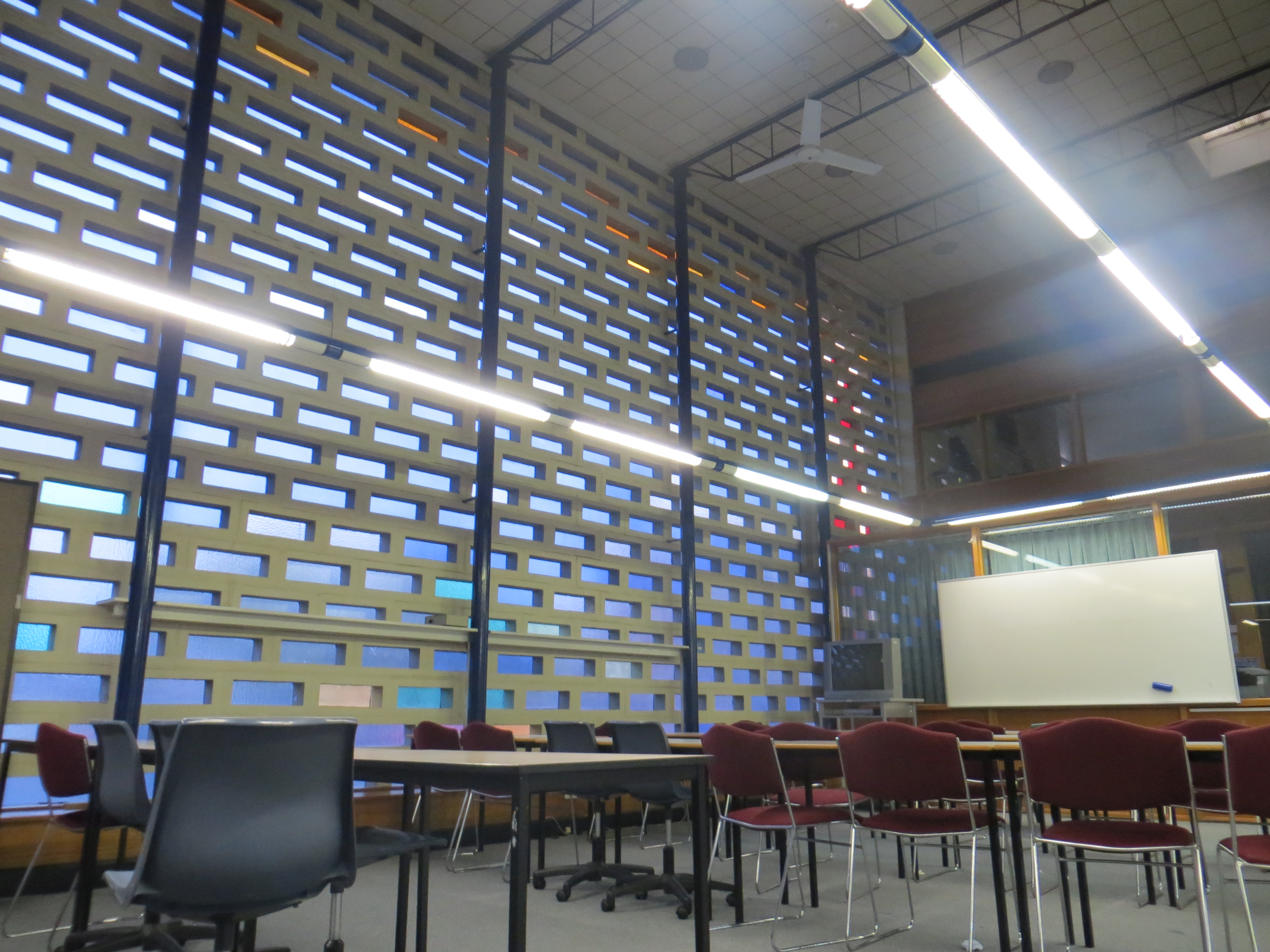
Interior view of Opaque coloured window

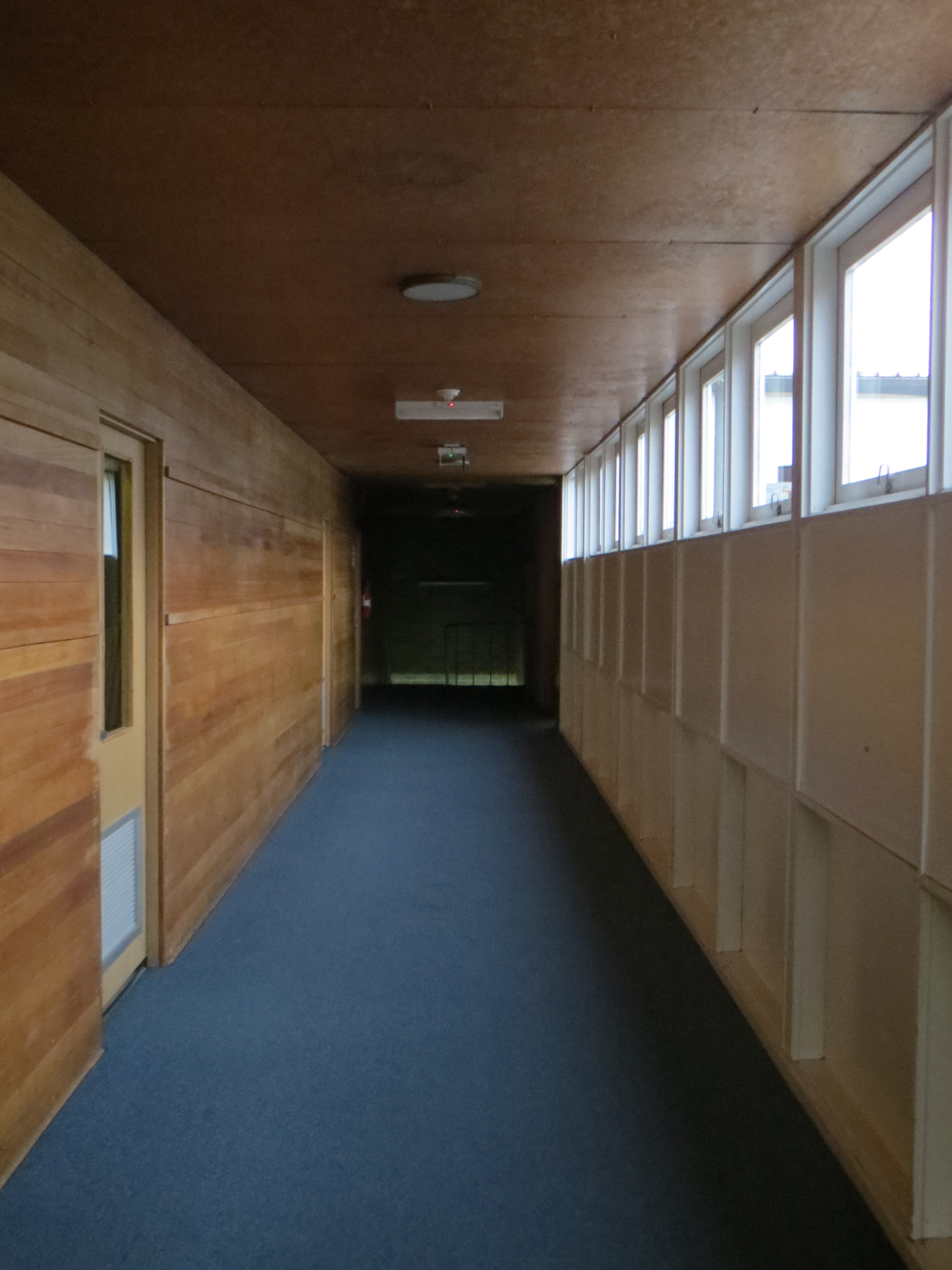
Corridor of the building

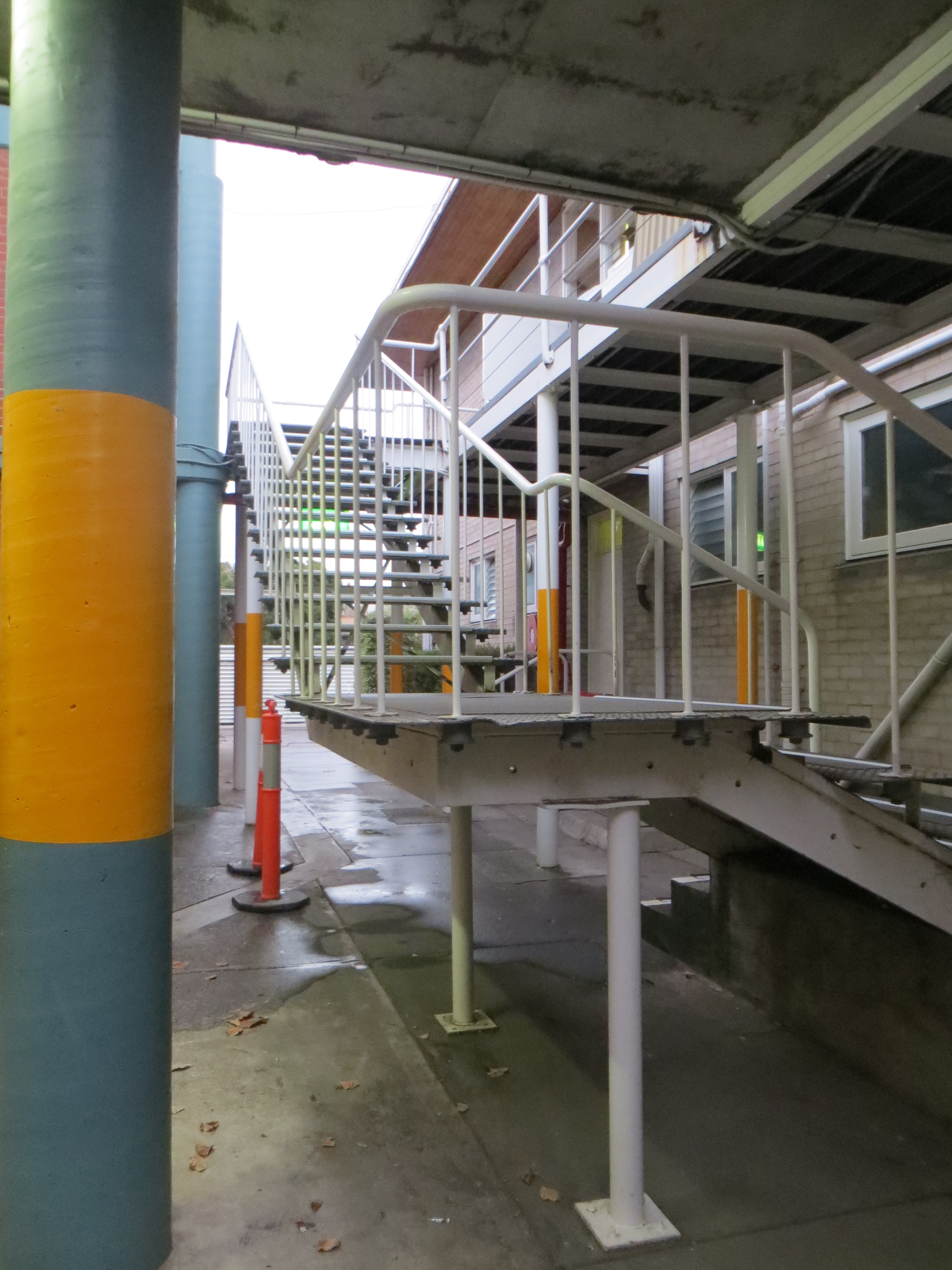
Relocated staircase

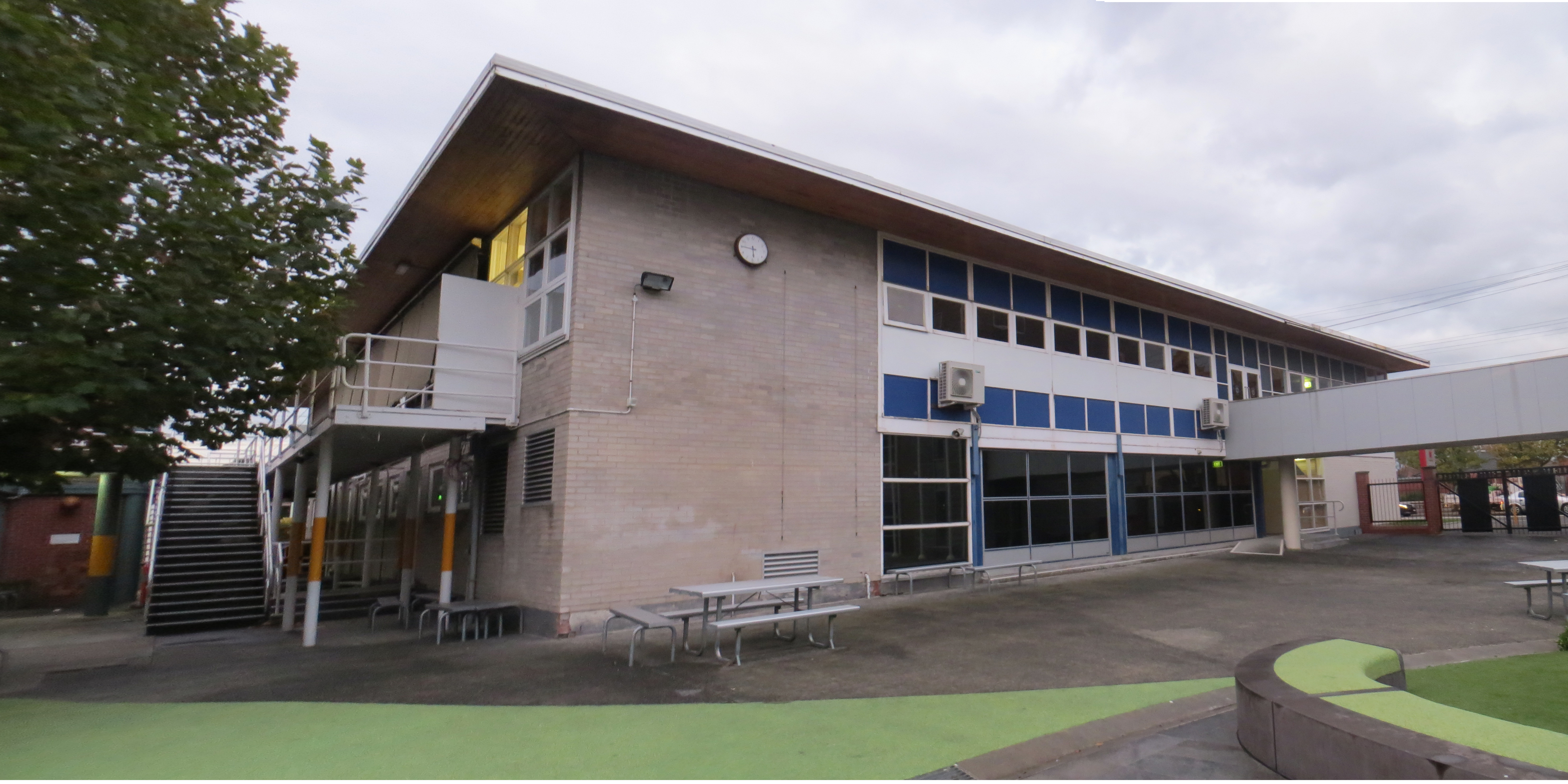
South west corner view

Site plan of the school

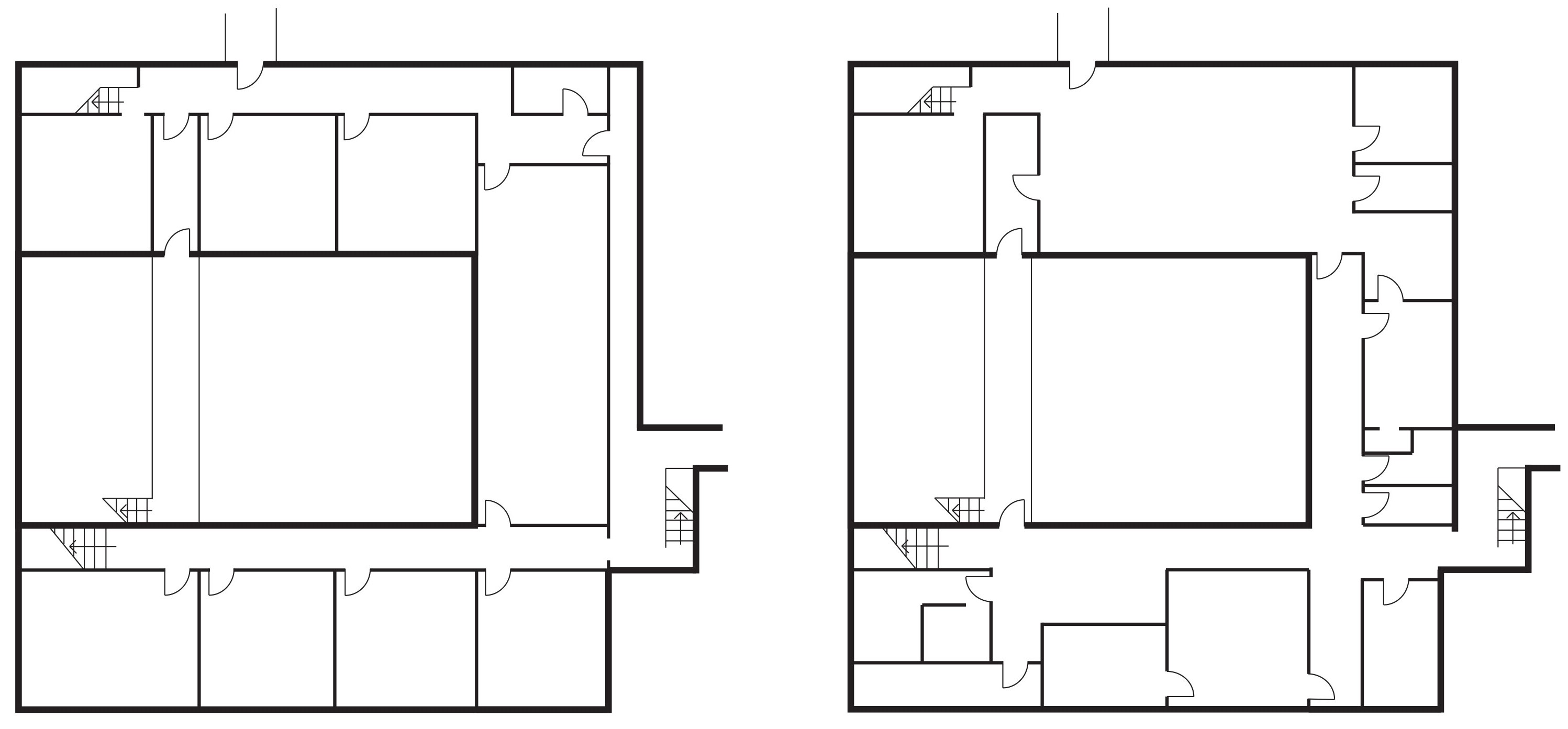
Floor Plans of the building

== See also ==
- Australian non-residential architectural styles
