= Melba College =

Secondary school in Croydon, Victoria, Australia

Information
- Type: Public, mixed-sex, secondary school
- Established: 1 January 2012 (as Croydon Maroondah College)
- Principal: Matthew Lee
- Staff: 108 (2024)
- Years offered: 7–12
- Enrolment: 677 (2025)
- Campus type: Suburban
- Houses: Marram; Boorimul; Narrang; Walert
- Colours: Eucalyptus green Terracotta; Charcoal
- Website: melba.vic.edu.au

Melba College is a public secondary school located in Croydon, Victoria, a suburb in the eastern part of Melbourne, Victoria, Australia. Established in 2012, Melba College serves students in Years 7 to 12 and had an enrolment of 677 students in 2025. The school's campus is located on Brentnall Road in Croydon.

== History ==
In 2009, a proposal was made to merge Maroondah Secondary College and Croydon Secondary College to create a new educational facility aimed at improving secondary education within the region. The proposal formed part of the Maroondah Education Coalition's reform efforts, though it faced considerable community opposition.

Despite this, the decision to combine the schools was finalised, and both secondary colleges officially ceased operations at the end of 2011. In 2012, the merged school operated under the temporary name Croydon Maroondah Secondary College. In 2013, the school was officially rebranded as Melba Secondary College.

The community was consulted for potential name suggestions, with the name "Melba" chosen in recognition of opera singer Nellie Melba and her cultural significance.

The merger coincided with the closure of nearby Parkwood Secondary College, with some of its students enrolling at the newly formed Melba College. The school's founding principal was Terry Bennett, who had previously led Maroondah Secondary College.

Between 2013 and 2017, the school operated across two campuses, with the former Croydon Secondary College site serving as the Junior Campus and the Brentnall Road site (formerly Maroondah SC) as the Senior Campus. In 2018, after substantial redevelopment, Melba College became a single-campus school.

== Building works ==
The Maroondah and Croydon Secondary Colleges were originally promised $100 million for redevelopment under the Maroondah Education Plan prior to the 2010 Victorian state election. However, when the government changed, the funding was not delivered, leaving the schools to operate without significant infrastructure upgrades for several years.

In the lead-up to the 2014 state election, both major political parties pledged $10 million toward school improvements. Melba College was subsequently included in the 2015–16 state budget as part of a $217 million package for statewide school upgrades. This included $500,000 in planning funds for an $18.4 million redevelopment.

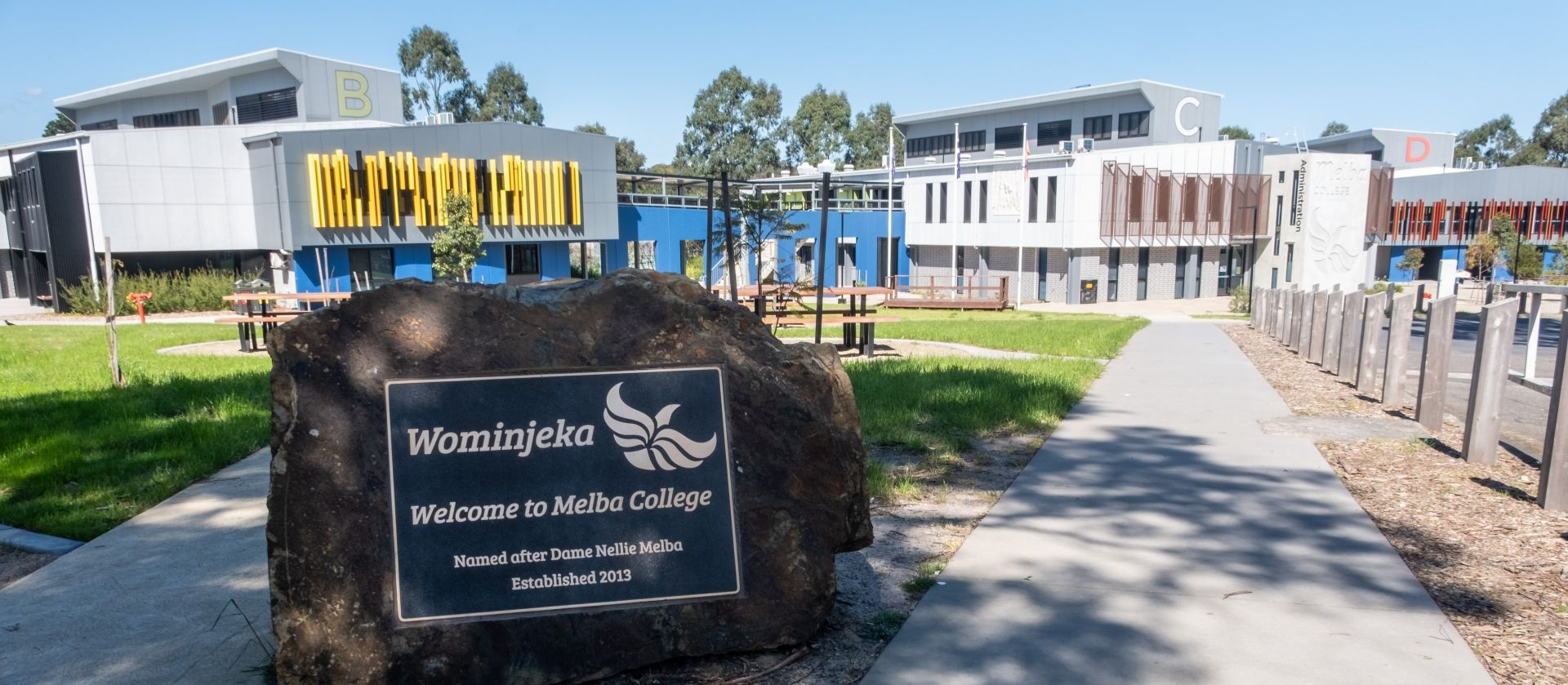
View of Melba College, 2024

The school has since undergone three stages of redevelopment:

- Stage 1 (2015–2018): Consolidated the school to a single campus at Brentnall Road. It included the construction of three double-storey buildings, a new library, cafeteria, and administration area. The $18.4 million project received the Best School Project – Above $5 million award at the 2018 Victorian School Design Awards.
- Stage 2 (completed 2020): Delivered a new STEAM centre and competition-grade indoor basketball stadium, developed in partnership with Kilsyth Basketball and Sport & Recreation Victoria. This $12.55 million project was a finalist at the 2020 School Design Awards.
- Stage 3 (underway 2023–2027): Involves the demolition of the existing music building, theatre, and old gymnasium to make way for a new performing arts centre, sports oval, and improved parking facilities. The $12.7 million upgrade is expected to be completed by late 2027. Stage 3 does not include a dedicated theatre for the college.

== Programs ==
Melba College offers a broad academic and co-curricular program across STEM, humanities, languages and the arts. It delivers VCE, VCE Vocational Major and VET pathways.

The school maintains an active arts program, offering subjects and extracurricular activities in visual arts, music and drama. Students can study Art, Studio Arts, Drama and Media at VCE level. The performing arts program includes annual musical productions, concerts, and student exhibitions that showcase creative work to the community.

Melba College's band performs regularly at local events and marches in Melbourne's annual ANZAC Day Parade.

The school also competes in interschool sporting events through School Sport Victoria (SSV) at division, regional and state levels, including athletics, swimming, cross-country and team sports.

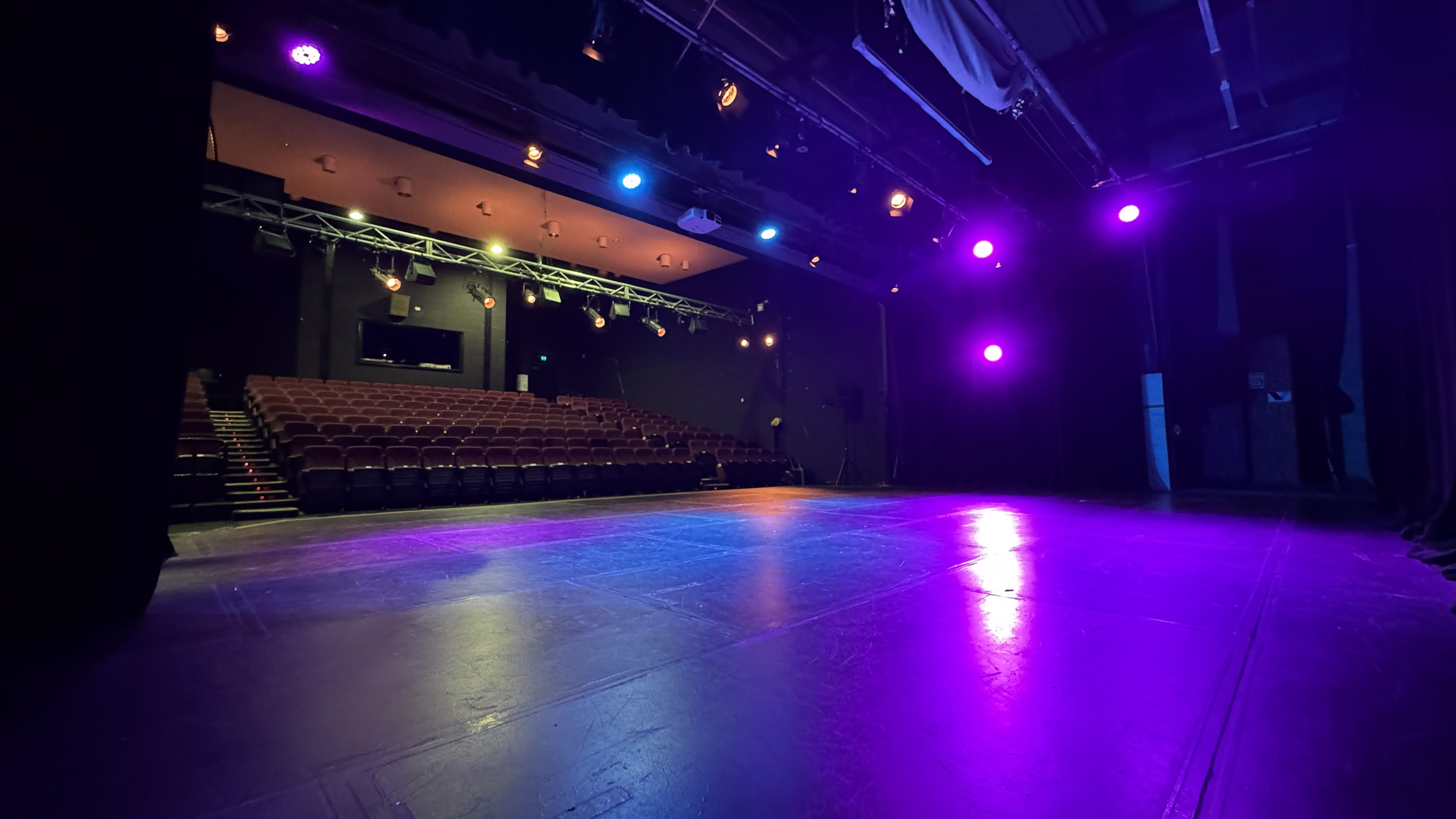
Melba College Theater, 2024

Melba College Theater during demolition, 2026

A highlight of the co-curricular calendar is the annual Melba College Production. Previous musicals have included:

- 2026 – Seussical the Musical
- 2025 – Legally Blonde
- 2024 – All Shook Up
- 2023 – The Addams Family
- 2022 – Shrek
- 2021 – Wicked

== Achievements ==
In 2024, Melba College achieved:

- A VCE median study score of 31.6
- "Blue Certification" in the School-Wide Positive Behaviour Support (SWPBS) program

== Notable alumni ==
- Matthew Haanappel – Paralympic gold medalist swimmer
