= Heatherhill Secondary College =

Coordinates: 37°58′14″S 145°09′02″E

- Melbourne, Victoria; Australia

Information
- Type: government, coeducation
- Motto: Hope Honour Strength; We care...we strive for success
- Established: 1966
- Closed: 2008
- Principal: Heather Lindsay
- Grades: 7–12
- Enrolment: Approx. 500
- Colours: yellow and blue
- Website: www.heatherhill.sc.vic.edu.au

Heatherhill Secondary College was a government coeducational school for students from years 7–12, located in Springvale South, Victoria. The school was established in 1966, and the campus was merged into Keysborough Secondary College on 6 October 2008.

== History ==
During 1965 the Education Department decided to establish a new secondary school in the Springvale and Noble Park area. A site was reserved and the official name was Heatherhill High School. Mr. N. R. Oxenbould was appointed as the first principal, and the first school assembly had 105 students, three members of staff and one office assistant which was held in the grounds of the Heatherhill State School on 2 February. The school celebrated its 40th anniversary in 2006 with a barbecue luncheon for past and present members of the school community. Patrick Boyd became the campus principal upon the school's merger with Keysborough.

== Curriculum ==
Years 7, 8, 9

Students in years 7, 8 and 9 are required to undertake studies in English, mathematics, science, humanities and physical education. These studies are further accompanied by a range of electives offered to the students. Pupils in year 9 undertake a unique program throughout the year that is aimed at both social and academic performance. This includes a community service program and various leadership programs throughout the year.

Years 10, 11, 12

Students in year 10 are required to undertake core studies in English, mathematics, science and physical education as well as an additional VCE units 1/2 subject. Students in years 11 and 12 are required to take several Victorian Certificate of Education (VCE) or Vocational Education and Training (VET) subjects as part of their senior schooling, as well as a compulsory VCE English units 1/2 or ESL units 1/2. The school also offers the Victorian Certificate of Applied Learning (VCAL) programme.

Academic Competitions

Students are encouraged to participate in competitions such as the Westpac Mathematics Competition and the International Competitions and Assessments for Schools Science Competition.

== Houses ==
The four houses with their associated colours are:

- Olympic (Yellow)
- Athol (Blue)
- Janine (Green)
- Noble (Red)

== Facilities ==
The school is divided into F, E, D, C and B blocks. In 2003, a sports gym was built to provide more accommodation for the school's sporting needs.

In 2007, a new learning centre will be fully operational and this building will serve as the primary year 9 learning facility. Furthermore, the school's new learning centre will serve as the primary music room to accommodate an overwhelming increase in young talented musicians.

== Sister School ==
Heatherhill Secondary College maintains close ties with Haimen Experimental School in the Jiangsu of China as part of the ongoing sister school relationship. Each year, a group of students from Haimen Experimental School are hosted during their stay in Australia by several year 7 and 8 students.

== Future Projects ==
Heatherhill Secondary College has proposed to merge with Chandler Secondary College, Springvale Secondary College and Coomoora Secondary College into two separate years 7–12 super schools. One campus is proposed for the Chandler site and the other for the Heatherhill site, and each campus is expected to hold 1200 students. Work is expected to begin in late 2008 and students will move into the two new campuses in 2010. The new name of the school is Keysborough College.

== See also ==
- List of schools in Victoria, Australia
- Victorian Certificate of Education
