= Parkwood Secondary College =

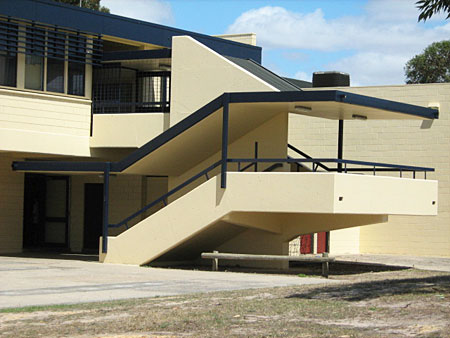

Location
- Ringwood North, Victoria; Australia; 37.7841°S 145.2414°E

Information
- Type: Public
- Motto: Values, Choices, Leadership, and Excellence
- Established: 1979
- Status: Closed
- Closed: December 2012
- Principal: Barbara Laidlaw
- Staff: 35
- Enrolment: 306 (2012)
- Campus: Suburban
- Colours: Blue, maroon, white
- Website: www.parkwood.vic.edu.au (archived 21 June 2012)

Parkwood Secondary College (PSC) was a co-educational public secondary school located in the Melbourne, Victoria, Australia suburb of Ringwood North. The school was founded in 1979 as Parkwood High School, and closed at the end of the 2012 school year. In 2014, the land and buildings were re-opened as the North Ringwood Community House.

The school provided high school education for Years 7 through 12, with Year 11 and 12 students undertaking the Victorian Certificate of Education. It formerly offered a range of VCE subjects as well as the Victorian Certificate of Applied Learning program.

== Proposed merger ==
In 2008, the then Labor state government announced a $100 million pledge to seven Victorian secondary schools. This resulted in cursory plans in 2009 to merge Parkwood Secondary College with the nearby Norwood Secondary College. Several years passed with no action, and after a change in government, the community was uncertain whether the new Liberal government would continue the plan to merge the schools.

On 1 March 2012, the principal Barbara Laidlaw announced that the merger would not proceed, stating that the school had "a strong and dynamic future".

== Closure ==
On 30 July 2012, the school council of Parkwood Secondary College announced its intention to close the school at the end of the year due to falling enrollments. This announcement came five months after the confirmation that Parkwood would continue indefinitely. In its final year of operation, there were 306 students enrolled at the school. After the closure, many of the college's students moved to either Norwood Secondary College or the newly merged Melba College. Some students of the school posted pictures, videos, and messages on a Facebook page in its memory.

== Current use of site ==
In October 2013, Maroondah City Council announced its intention to re-open the site of Parkwood Secondary College as a Community House and Men's Shed. The site had been dormant for nearly 2 years and had become a target of vandals, so significant works were undertaken including the removal of graffiti and vandalism. Since its re-opening in 2014, the site now serves as the North Ringwood Community House, which was previously located at the rear of the Holy Spirit Primary School in Ringwood North.
