= Croydon Secondary College =

Location
- Croydon Road; Croydon, Victoria; Australia; 37°47′21.6″S 145°16′56.4″E

Information
- Former names: Croydon High School
- Type: Public
- Established: 1958
- Status: Merged 2012 (renamed Melba College in 2013)
- Principal: Terry Bennett
- Qualifications offered: Victorian Certificate of Education (VCE), Victorian Certificate of Applied Learning (VCAL)
- Years offered: 7–12
- Enrolment: 560 (2010)
- Houses: Emerald, Sapphire, Ruby, Gold
- Colours: Red, blue and white
- Values: Respect, Honesty, Commitment, Achievement
- Website: www.croydonsc.vic.edu.au (archived August 2011)

Croydon Secondary College was a secondary school located on Croydon Road in the suburb of Croydon, Victoria, Australia. It was established in 1958 and was initially called Croydon High School. The school's final principal before its merger was Terry Bennett, who was inaugurated at the start of 2011.

== Programs ==
The school offered the Victorian Certificate of Education (VCE) and the Victorian Certificate of Applied Learning (VCAL). One LOTE subject was offered, which was German. Croydon's sister school was Albert Einstein Gymnasium, in Ulm, Germany. The college was part of The Eastland Cluster of Schools for Vocational Education Programs, which gave students access to various VET courses, of which VET Music was hosted at Croydon Secondary.

The college was part of the Yarra Valley eLearning Community along with six other schools. This program was funded through Phase 1 of the Leading Schools Fund. The school was also part of the Maroondah Education Coalition, along with Maroondah Secondary College with which it later merged.

Croydon Secondary College had a music program incorporating a marching band, wind symphony, concert band and junior band. The school also had a successful debating team which won the state championship in 2007, and hosted the regional competition for Years 7 and 8.

== Merger ==
At the end of 2011, Croydon Secondary College ceased operations as an individual school, and merged with Maroondah Secondary College under the temporary name Croydon Maroondah Secondary College.

Between 2013 and 2017, the old Croydon Secondary College site served as the Junior Campus for Melba College. The campus closed in 2017 when all students moved into the newly built buildings on the former Maroondah Secondary College site.

== Notable alumni ==
- Matthew Haanappel, Paralympic swimming athlete
- Damian Cowell, TISM frontman
- Kane Johnson, former captain of the Richmond Football Club
- Kerri Judd, Victorian Director of Public Prosecutions
