= Maroondah Secondary College =

- Entrance of the school, c. 2007

Location
- Brentnall Rd; Croydon, Victoria, 3136; Australia; 37.7956°S 145.2609°E

Information
- Type: Public mixed-sex secondary school
- Motto: Together we learn, together we grow
- Opened: 1973
- Status: Merged 2012 (renamed Melba College in 2013)
- Principal: Judi Benney
- Grades: 7–12
- Enrolment: 590 (2012)
- Campus type: Suburban
- Colours: Dark blue Yellow; White
- Slogan: A tradition of excellence
- Website: maroondahsc.vic.edu.au (archived 23 June 2012)

Maroondah Secondary College was a secondary school located on the suburban boundary of Ringwood and Croydon, 28 kilometres east of Melbourne, Victoria. The school was opened in 1965 with principal Lindsay Young. In 1969, Harry Fletcher became principal, who held the position into the 1980s. The school was originally known as Croydon West High School until 1971, when the name was changed to Maroondah High School. The school entrance was on Brentnall Road in Croydon, and this site is now used as the main campus of Melba College.

The College had an enrolment of approximately 590 students in its final year. It was part of the Maroondah Education Coalition.

The school offered both VCE and VCAL programs to students, but with a limited range of subjects. Additionally they included the opportunity to complete TAFE certificates through the VCE Vocational Education and Training (VET) program. Two LOTE languages were offered at Maroondah, French and Japanese.

The school had established a connection with Sasayama Homei Senior High School in Japan, who raised money for victims of the Black Saturday bushfires in 2009. Maroondah then returned the favour by donating $1500 to victims of the 2011 Tōhoku earthquake and tsunami.

A $750,000 VCE study centre and newly refurbished library was finished in late 2006. In 2007, the old science wing was re-furnished, modernised and equipped with smart whiteboards. There were two gyms, and a theatre.

In September 1996 a 17-year-old student from Maroondah Secondary College, Daron Wilkinson, committed suicide. It was believed that a school inquiry into the integrity of Daron's assessment in VCE English contributed to his suicide. Following this, the school established a relationship with the Peer Support Foundation, an independent youth support group.

== Merger ==
At the start of 2012, Maroondah Secondary College began a merger with Croydon Secondary College. In 2012, the two schools adopted the temporary name Croydon Maroondah College, but continued at independent campuses. In 2013, the schools officially merged to become Melba College.

Until 2017, the former site of Maroondah Secondary College acted as the Senior Campus of Melba College. Since late 2017, all students reside at this site.

== Notable alumni ==
- Wayne Johnston (VFL footballer)
- Neil Clarke (AFL footballer)
- Brett Montgomery (AFL footballer)
