= Fitzroy High School =

Coordinates: 37°47′08″S 144°59′19″E

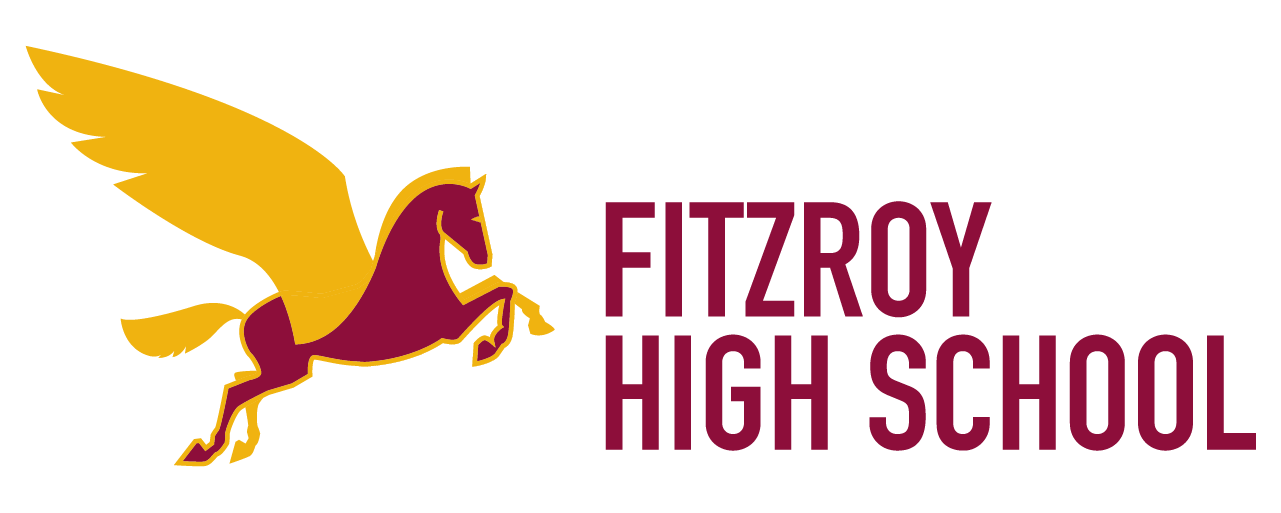

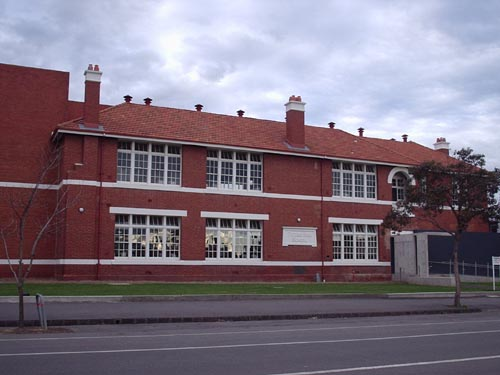
- Fitzroy North, Victoria; Australia

Information
- Type: state school, co-educational, day school
- Established: 2004
- Principal: Adam Cribbes Assistant Principal: Matt Roberts
- Enrolment: 588 (2016), 602 (2017), 615 (2018), 620 (2019)
- Colours: Gold, maroon
- Website: www.fitzroyhs.vic.edu.au

Fitzroy High School is a state school catering for Years 7 to 10, located in Falconer Street, Fitzroy, Melbourne, Australia. The school was first opened in 1915, but closed in 1992. After a long community campaign, it reopened in 2004.

== History ==
The Fitzroy Central School opened in 1915, admitting students from Grades 5 to 8. In 1957, it received its current name, and was allowed to take students up to Year 12. In 1988, it merged with Exhibition High School, but retained its original site.

=== Closure ===
After coming to power in 1992, then-Victorian Premier Jeff Kennett embarked on an array of budget cuts in an attempt to restore the state's flagging finances. As a result, the decision was made to close a significant number of schools across the state. Fitzroy High was one of the first to be earmarked for closure, and it shut down at the end of the 1992 school year.

After its closure, the local community feared that the site, which had been public land ever since 1871, would be sold for development. Community groups decided to occupy the site in an attempt to prevent its sale and, in a widely publicised campaign, maintained a 24-hour vigil for fourteen months. People occupied the site in four-hour shifts and slept overnight in the principal's office or administration wing.

In 1993, the state government finally struck a deal with the local community, and the Kangan Batman TAFE was allowed to use the site. They operated a campus at the site until 1998, when budgetary requirements forced it to close. The following year, they handed the site back to the Education Department. Around the same time, Jeff Kennett lost power and was replaced by Steve Bracks, who was more supportive of their cause.

The site lay dormant for two years, until then-Education Minister Mary Delahunty approved plans to reopen the school for Years 7 to 10 in 2001. The site was significantly renovated, involving the construction of a new science and technology wing, a library and a food technology division.

In 2002, the school was used as a central filming location for the children's series Short Cuts.

=== Reopening ===
On 28 January 2004, the school reopened, with 135 students in Years 7 and 8. It expanded to accommodating years 9 and 10 in 2005, and plans were announced in December 2005 to begin classes for Years 11 and 12 in 2007 in conjunction with another Melbourne school, Collingwood College.

A building program, comprising a unique design to facilitate the school's learning philosophy, was completed in 2009 to increase accommodation for an extra 12 staff and 225 students from years 7 to 12. The building won design awards such as the Dulux Colour and the Australian Institute of Architecture Victorian Chapter annual award 2010 – Public Alterations and Additions. The school was also short-listed in the 2010 Premier Design Awards in Victoria.

=== New campus ===
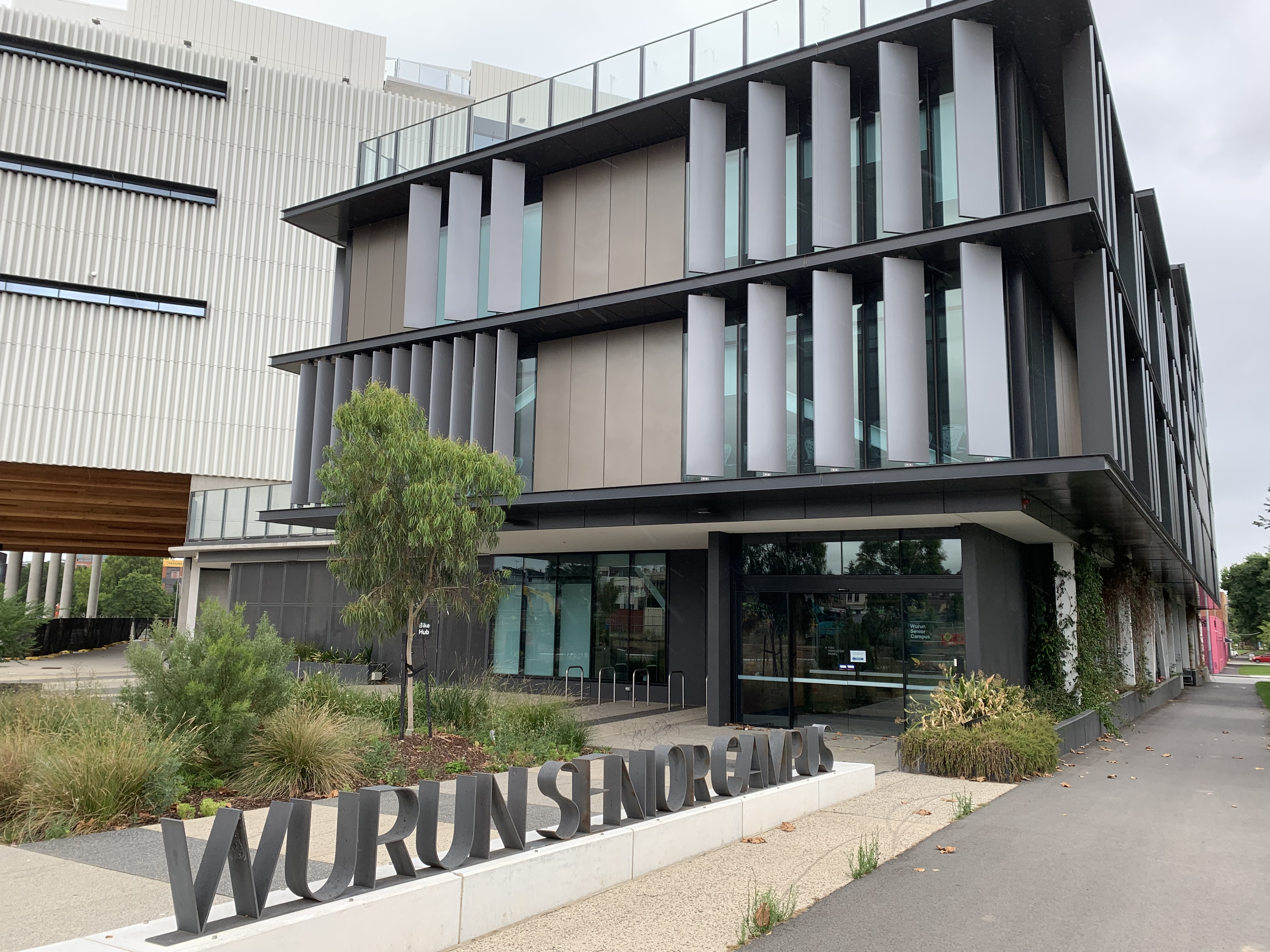
Wurun Senior Campus

Since the start of 2022, Fitzroy High School has opened a new campus, the Wurun Senior Campus, that they are sharing with Collingwood College. Their original (and main) campus only hosts students from years 7 to 10.

== Notable alumni ==
- Filmmaker Nadia Tass
- Invincibles Test Cricketer Neil Harvey
- Architect/developer Nonda Katsalidis
- Cinematographer/director Vincent Monton
- Actor George Spartels
- Criminal Mario Condello
- Politician Lidia Thorpe (Years 7 and 9)

=== Teachers ===
Writer Helen Garner, former MP Caroline Hogg, former Lord Mayor of Melbourne John So, painter John Brack, and past director of the National Gallery of Australia James Mollison previously taught at the school.
