= Hume Central Secondary College =

Location
- Broadmeadows, Victoria; Australia; 37°40′51.8″S 144°54′56.8″E

Information
- Type: co-educational public government school
- Motto: Achievement Diversity Success
- Principal: Jeff Mulcahy
- Years offered: 7–12
- Enrolment: approx. 1200
- Campus: Blair Street, Dimboola Road, & Town Park
- Colours: Navy blue, grey, white
- Website: humecentralsc.vic.edu.au

Hume Central Secondary College is a co-educational public school located in Broadmeadows, Victoria, Australia. Hume Central was founded in the mid 2000s by the merger of underperforming Erinbank, Broadmeadows and Hillcrest Secondary Colleges.

== Curriculum ==
=== Years 7–12 ===
The senior program is built around skills, interests and career pathways. The curriculum is broader and more specialised than Years 7–9 and includes mathematics methods, specialist mathematics, physics, psychology, business management, studio arts, media studies, historical studies, health and human development and legal studies.

== Campuses ==
=== Blair Street Campus ===
The junior campus opened in 2009. The open-plan design of the buildings creates spaces that are flexible. A cafeteria is located in the central building. The Blair Street Junior campus shares its site with the Broadmeadows Primary School and the English Language Centre, which caters for Years 7–10 students who have recently arrived in Australia. The campus has won several awards for its progressive and environmentally friendly design.

=== Dimboola Road Campus ===
Hume Central Secondary College's Dimboola Road Campus was built on the former Hillcrest Secondary College site. The Dimboola Road Junior campus shares its site with Broadmeadows Valley Primary School. This campus was officially opened by the former Premier John Brumby in 2010. The junior campus has been operational since 2009 with new facilities. The new design sees students work in self-contained year level learning communities, which are open plan with flexible spaces that can be adapted for different types of learning activities.

=== Town Park Campus ===
Hume Central Secondary College's Town Park Campus is a senior secondary campus catering for Year 10–12 students. The senior campus building is designed to cater for peak enrolments of 675 students. The Senior Campus includes 87 car parking spaces, an access road linking the school to an extension of the newly named Tanderrum Way and the campus is integrated with landscaping and pathway connections. The campus is close to Kangan Batman TAFE which allows students to complete TAFE courses in VET.

== Notable alumni ==
- John Ilhan (Broadmeadows Secondary College) – founder of Crazy John's
- Chris Johnson (Erinbank Secondary College) – Australian rules footballer
- Jose Romero (Erinbank Secondary College) – Australian rules footballer

== See also ==
- Erinbank Secondary College
- Hillcrest Secondary College
- Broadmeadows Secondary College
- List of schools in Victoria
- Victorian Certificate of Education
