= Collingwood College, Victoria =

Collingwood College
- Annual spring fair gathering

Location
- Collingwood, Victoria; Australia
- Coordinates: 37°48′11″S 144°59′26″E

Information
- Type: Public, co-educational, Kindergarten to Year 12
- Motto: Inspiring young people
- Established: 1882
- Principal: Angela Watters & Chris Millard
- Enrolment: 835
- Website: www.collingwood.vic.edu.au

Collingwood College is a government school located in the inner-city suburb of Collingwood, close to the Melbourne CBD.

Established in 1882, it is one of Melbourne's oldest inner city schools.

The school has three campuses: its main campus is near Hoddle Street, on the corner of Cromwell Street and McCutcheon Way. Its Alternative School campus provides academic and vocational learning to a select group of students. In 2022, it opened Wurun Senior Campus for VCE students, in partnership with Fitzroy High School.

== History ==
In 1882, the Vere Street National School No 2462 was established. Cromwell Street State School joined Vere Street National School in 1912. In 1915, Collingwood Domestic Arts School was established. In 1975, the Collingwood Education Centre was established. It was renamed Collingwood College in 1990. A history of Collingwood College entitled The School on the Flat: Collingwood College 1882–2007 was published to mark the 125th anniversary of the school's opening.

== Academics ==
VCE studies offered by the school:
Biology, Business Management, Chinese First Language, Chinese Second Language, English, English (EAL), Further Mathematics, General Mathematics, Literature, Mathematical Methods (CAS), Media, Product Design and Technology, Psychology, Specialist Mathematics, Studio Arts, Visual Communication Design.

== See also ==
- Education in Australia
