= Erinbank Secondary College =

Location
- Westmeadows; Northern Metropolitan
- Coordinates: 37°40′18″S 144°54′24″E

Information
- Type: Government secondary college
- Opened: 1970s
- Closed: 2008
- Principal: Eric Savini (2007)
- Years: 7–12
- Education system: VCE, VCAL and VET
- Campuses: 1

Erinbank Secondary College was a Victorian government secondary college that closed in 2008. The college was located in Westmeadows a north-western suburb of Melbourne, Australia. Erinbank provided a comprehensive education from years 7 through to 12 offering both VCE and VCAL qualifications at Year 11 and 12 levels.

Founded in the 1970s, Erinbank Secondary College was originally known as Westmeadows Heights High School before being renamed Erinbank High School after the street that the school occupied.

Erinbank ceased to exist after a merger with neighbouring schools Hillcrest and Broadmeadows Secondary Colleges. The merged schools formed Hume Central Secondary College.

The site that the college occupied has since been redeveloped into a residential housing estate.

== See also ==
- Hume Central Secondary College
- List of schools in Victoria, Australia
- Victorian Certificate of Education
