= St. John's Greek Orthodox College =

Coordinates: 37°46′49.3″S 145°02′10″E

St. John's College
- Preston, Victoria; Australia

Information
- Type: Independent, co-educational, primary, secondary day
- Motto: ΑΙΕΝ ΑΡΙΣΤΕΥΕΙΝ (Forever Excelling)
- Denomination: Greek Orthodox Christian
- Established: 1979
- Principal: Andrew Ponsford
- Years: P to 12
- Enrolment: 280 (P–12)
- Colours: Blue, white and yellow
- Website: www.stjohnspreston.vic.edu.au

St John’s College is an independent co-educational P–12 school, founded on the Greek Orthodox tradition. Initially established in North Carlton in 1979, the college moved to its current location in Preston in 1984. The college was founded to provide education of Greek culture and religion to Melbourne’s large Greek community. Today it accepts students from a wide range of cultures, whilst remaining under the auspices of the Greek Orthodox Archdiocese of Australia.

Over recent years, St John’s College has undergone significant refurbishment, including the addition of a new Centre for the Environment, Technology and Sustainability, with brand new science labs. In 2016 it won The Educator Innovative Schools Award for achieving improved learning outcomes for its senior students.

== The emblem ==
The motto, written in Ancient Greek : "ΑΙΕΝ ΑΡΙΣΤΕΥΕΙΝ" (A-in aris-TEV-in) means "Forever Excelling". The emblem of the school includes the official emblem of the Eastern Orthodox Church, The Two Headed Eagle.
