= Hays International College =

Private college in Melbourne, Australia

Coordinates: 37°49′55″S 145°07′53″E

- Motto: Eruditio Nostram Viam Illuminat
- Motto in English: Education Illuminates Our Way
- Type: Private
- Established: 2009
- Location: Box Hill, Victoria, Australia
- Campus: Urban
- Website: https://hic.vic.edu.au/

Hays International College is a tertiary level training institute situated in Melbourne, Australia.

The college offers certificate and diploma courses in Leisure and Health, Individual Support and Early Childhood Education and Care.

Many of its students take up their chosen vocational course. Subsequent completion of a diploma course provides graduates with entry to degree courses offered at universities. The course chosen by a student may also give access to Australia's migration programs.

== Location ==
From 2009 to January 2022, Hays International College was located at 15 Hay Street, Box Hill South – the former site of St. Leo's Christian Brothers College, which closed in 1994.

In February 2022, Hays International College moved to 693 Station Street, Box Hill.

== History ==
Hays International College was developed in 2006 and obtained licensing in 2008.
