= Hillcrest Secondary College =

Hicrest Secondary College

Location
- Broadmeadows; Northern Metropolitan; 37°40′51″S 144°54′49″E

Information
- Years: 7–12
- Education system: VCE, VCAL and VET
- Campuses: 1

Hillcrest Secondary College was a Victorian Government secondary college. The college was located in Broadmeadows a largely working class suburb of Melbourne, Australia. Hillcrest provided a comprehensive education from years 7 through to 12 offering both VCE and VCAL qualifications at Year 11 and 12 levels.

Hillcrest ceased to exist after a merger with neighbouring Erinbank and Broadmeadows Secondary Colleges. The merged schools formed Hume Central Secondary College.

The site that the college once occupied is now home to Broadmeadows Valley Primary School, The Broadmeadows Special Developmental School and the Dimboola Road Campus of Hume Central Secondary College.

== See also ==
- Hume Central Secondary College
- List of schools in Victoria
- Victorian Certificate of Education
