= Broadmeadows Secondary College =

School in Victoria, Australia

Location
- Broadmeadows; Northern Metropolitan
- Coordinates: 37°40′47″S 144°55′42″E

Information
- Years: 7–12
- Education system: VCE, VCAL and VET
- Campuses: 1

Broadmeadows Secondary College was a co-educational secondary college located in Victoria, Australia. The college was located in Broadmeadows, a largely working class suburb of Melbourne. The college provided a comprehensive education from years 7 through to 12 offering both VCE and VCAL qualifications at Year 11 and 12 levels.

Broadmeadows Secondary College ceased to exist after a merger with neighbouring Erinbank and Hillcrest Secondary Colleges. The merged schools formed Hume Central Secondary College.

== See also ==
- Hume Central Secondary College
- List of schools in Victoria
- Victorian Certificate of Education
