= Gilmore College for Girls =

- formerly Footscray Domestic Arts School

Location
- 298 Barkly Street; Footscray, Victoria; Australia
- Coordinates: 37.7987°S 144.8948°E

Information
- Type: Government
- Established: 1925
- Administrator: Victorian Department of Education
- Years: Secondary School
- Campus: Footscray, Victoria
- Affiliation: Victorian Department of Education
- Website: http://www.gilmorecollegeforgirls.vic.edu.au/

Gilmore College for Girls was a secondary school in Footscray. It was founded in 1925 as the Footscray Domestic Arts School in response to the vast demand for employment in the Domestic Arts.
