= Keysborough Secondary College =

Australian school

Coordinates: 37°58′54″S 145°09′38″E

- Melbourne, Victoria; Australia

Information
- Type: Government, coeducation
- Established: 2008; 18 years ago
- Principal: Aaron Sykes
- Grades: 7–12
- Enrolment: 2194
- Colours: Purple, black, white, and grey
- Website: www.keysboroughsc.vic.edu.au

Keysborough Secondary College is an Australian dual campus government coeducational school for students from years 7–12, with campuses located in Springvale South, Victoria and Keysborough, Victoria. The four participating schools were officially merged into Keysborough Secondary College on 6 October 2008. The merger is valued at $43 million.

== History ==
During 2007, DEECD proposed a merger with Chandler Secondary College, Heatherhill Secondary College, Springvale Secondary College and Coomoora Secondary College into two separate year 7–12 super schools capable of holding 1,200 students each. This proposal developed into the a plan for one super school at two campuses, the redeveloped sites of Heatherhill Secondary College and Chandler Secondary College. The interim name of the school before the official merger was briefly Keysborough Springvale Secondary College. Construction and redevelopment of the Acacia (former Chandler) and Banksia (former Heatherhill) campus sites begun early October 2009. Former Principal of Chandler Debbie Locco was killed in May 2020 in a cycling incident in Beaumaris. Locco while Principal of Chandler, was a supporter of the Skyline Foundation alongside her husband Frank. In December of 2025 a staff member was arrested after he stabbed the principal. On Monday May 11th, 2026 former teacher Kim Ramchen plead guilty and was sentenced to 5 months imprisonment, which was confirmed by another staff member to students and teachers at Keysborough College on Compass.

== Curriculum ==
=== Years 7, 8, 9 ===
Students in years 7, 8 and 9 are required to undertake studies in English, Mathematics, Science, Humanities, Arts, PE, and a language. These studies are further accompanied by a range of electives offered to the students.

=== Years 10, 11, 12 ===
Students in year 10 are required to undertake core studies in English, mathematics, science and physical education as well as an additional VCE units 1/2 subject. Students in years 11 and 12 are required to take several Victorian Certificate of Education (VCE) or Vocational Education and Training (VET) subjects as part of their senior schooling, as well as a compulsory VCE English units 1/2 or ESL units 1/2. The school also offers the Victorian Certificate of Applied Learning (VCAL) programme.

=== Academic competitions ===
Students are encouraged to participate in competitions such as the Westpac Mathematics Competition and the International Competitions and Assessments for Schools Science Competition.

== Campuses ==
The school operates with two campuses, Acacia (former Chandler Secondary College) and Banksia (former Heatherhill Secondary College).

The site of the former Springvale Secondary College campus was closed at the end of 2010 whilst the Coomoora Secondary College campus site was closed at the end of 2011.

== Facilities ==
Demolition of some existing buildings at the Acacia and Banksia campuses commenced in September 2009, with the first stage of construction of the new buildings worth a combined total of $22.7 million commencing by the end of 2009.

== See also ==
- List of schools in Victoria
- Wellington Secondary College
