= Caroline Springs College =

Former secondary school

Coordinates: 37°44′44″S 144°44′17″E

Location
- Caroline Springs, Melbourne, Victoria; Australia

Information
- Established: 2000
- Closed: 2011
- Grades: Kindergarten - Year 12

Caroline Springs College was a government secondary school located in Caroline Springs, Victoria, Australia. Established in 2000, the school served students from kindergarten to Year 12 on four campuses.

In 2011 Caroline Springs College council decided to split the four campuses making up Caroline Springs College into separate entities, and the former Caroline Springs campus became Brookside College. Brookside College is a Government P–9 school with around 1026 students (as at February 2016).
