= Australian HPV Super Series =

- Category: Velomobile racing
- Country: Australia
- Inaugural season: 1986
- Classes: 7 (18 including female, masters, and solo teams)
- Teams: 300+
- Teams' champion: (South Australia) ELEMNT Racing Inc (ION)
- Official website: Official website

The Australian HPV Super Series, also known as the Adelaide University Australian Human Powered Vehicle (HPV) Super Series under sponsorship and in full, is an annual championship held in South Australia and Western Australia featuring velomobiles racing on enclosed circuits for a duration between 6 and 24 hours.

The largest series of its kind in the world, it attracts teams from across Australia and overseas. Since 2018, the championship has consisted of six races, culminating in the 24 hour event at Murray Bridge.

== History ==
In 1986, what would become the inaugural Pedal Prix race was held in the car park of what was at the time the Underdale Campus of the University of South Australia on Holbrooks Road. There were less than a dozen participating teams. This event marks the start of the Australian HPV Super Series and at the time it generated tremendous interest. Vehicles varied considerably in sophistication and quality but the potential to get students involved in designing, making and testing the vehicles was readily apparent.

In 1987 the event was moved to the Road Safety Centre on Oaklands Road in Marion (later turned into a wetlands) to cater for the increased number of teams. Rules and standards were developed to guide teams in building vehicles so that they were safer. This site was considerably more complex with many corners and a hill to test riders and their vehicles.

The popularity of the event continued to grow and it soon became apparent that the number of entries was growing beyond the capacity of the Road Safety Centre. As a result, in 1992 the event was moved to the Adelaide International Raceway at Virginia. This site easily catered for the increased number of entries. The wider, flatter track saw records for the distance travelled in the 24 hour endurance race increase. A major disadvantage of this site has been its openness and exposure to weather. Wind, dust and an uninteresting track layout had the committee looking for alternatives. 1996 marked the last time that petrol driven hybrids were allowed to participate. At various stages throughout the history of the 24 hour race there have been categories for petrol and solar hybrids as well as a commuter category where more than one rider was in the vehicle.

1997 saw the event moved to Sturt Reserve, Murray Bridge, where for the first time public roads were sealed off specially for the event. It was felt that the new venue would comfortably accommodate the number of entries anticipated, provide a greater challenge for teams and provide a better atmosphere for all competitors, spectators and visitors. The field at the first Murray Bridge totalled 90 teams. The record size for the competing field at Murray Bridge was 228 set in 2009.

In 2003, the HPV Super Series began, with a championship season that spanned four races. They included two 3 hour sprints on the same day and later a 6-hour race all at Victoria Park and then concluded with the 24 hour Murray Bridge event. The two 3 hour sprints were then replaced with a single 6 hour race. A 9-hour race was trialed once during 2009 for race 2 at Victoria Park.

The 2013 Murray Bridge event was the first to include teams representing five states/territories with teams from South Australia, Victoria, Western Australia, New South Wales and the Northern Territory present.

In 2014, a street circuit in Loxton, South Australia was introduced as the new opening race of a four-race championship. In addition, the McNamara Park circuit near Mount Gambier and a street circuit in Busselton, Western Australia were introduced as non-series events. The Murray Bridge street circuit remained as the final race of the series and the two Victoria Park races also remained unchanged.

In 2017, the McNamara Park circuit was upgraded to a series event as the opening race of the series. In 2018, the race in Busselton was also upgraded to a series event as the penultimate race.

On 14 December 2017, it was announced by the Australian HPV Super Series and the Victorian HPV Grand Prix Series that National Vehicle Specifications had been adopted for the 2018 season onward, subjecting both series to common vehicle specifications and making it easier for teams to compete across both series without needing to change their vehicle set-ups; in previous years, both series had their own specification guidelines to comply with.

For the 2016 and 2017 seasons, in all races apart from Murray Bridge, race days were separated for Category 4 (Saturday) and the remaining categories (Sunday). This was scaled back to only include the two Victoria Park races for the 2018-19 seasons.

The 2020 season abruptly came to a halt due to the COVID-19 pandemic with most races ether being cancelled or "rescheduled".

The 2021 season was cut short after just a few races again because of Covid. the Adelaide 6 hour was held on a shorter course due to the covid testing clinic at Victoria Park.

The 2022 season saw all races held for the first time since covid with only the Adelaide 6 hour being split between 2 days. Saturday was community teams and Sunday was school teams. the 2022 season also saw the return of the Murray bridge 24-hour race for the first time since 2019. Sadly, at the end of the season Aroura racing said goodbye after a season win.

The 2023 season saw the addition of the main sponsor University of South Australia entering the races with their trike Evo. All races where held this season, and the Victoria Park long track came back into play for the first time since the COVID-19 pandemic. 2023 saw Wattle Racing's Gunyah take out the championship win and Trump Trikes take out the 24 hour win.

=== Notable riders ===
- Steele Von Hoff (Gtrikes)
- Patrick Jonker (DMR Racing)
- Cameron Platt (Platt Racing)
- Kyle Lierich (Trump Trikes/Gtrikes Factory Racing)
- Reece Harris (Wattle Racing)
- Darcy Strudwick (Uni SA Evo)
- Griffin Knight (ELEMNT Racing Inc)
- Justin Counihan (ELEMNT Racing Inc)
- Matt Allen (ELEMNT Racing Inc)
- Kyle "tugger" Craddock (Replica Racing)
- Jethro Liquvist (Gtrikes)
- Harry Hollaway (Replica racing)
- Harrison Phillips (Wattle Racing)
- Ryan Wiebrecht (Replica Racing)
- Andrew Charters (Replica Racing)

== Racing categories and divisions ==
The four categories are divided under two classifications of "School Categories" and "Community Categories". Introduced in 2006, all school and community categories have further sub-categories for All Female teams.

The following category criteria are accurate as of the 2020 season.

School categories
		Definition
S1 S1F	Junior School	Consists of riders in Years 5 to 7 from a single school that are under the age of 14 on 1 January.: Up to 20 riders per vehicle
S2 S2F	Middle School	Consists of riders in Year 10 or below from a single school that are under the age of 17 on 1 January.: Up to 14 riders per vehicle
S3 S3F	Senior School	Consists of riders in Year 12 or below from a single school that are under the age of 20 on 1 January.: Up to 12 riders per vehicle

Community categories
		Definition
C4 C4F	Under 14	Community based. Consists of riders that are under the age of 14 on 1 January.: Up to 20 riders per vehicle
C5	Under 17	Community based. Consists of riders that are under the age of 17 on 1 January.: Up to 14 riders per vehicle
C5F	Under 17	Community based. Consists of riders that are under the age of 17 on 1 January.: Up to 14 riders per vehicle
C6 C6F	Under 20	Community based. Consists of riders that are under the age of 20 on 1 January.: Up to 12 riders per vehicle
C7 C7F	Open	Community based. Consists of riders of any age.: Up to 10 riders per vehicle
C7M C7MF	Open – Masters	Community based. Consists of riders that are aged 35 or older on 1 January.: Up to 10 riders per vehicle
C7S C7SF	Solo	Adelaide rounds only.: 1 rider per vehicle only

== Point system ==
Position
1st	2nd	3rd	4th	5th	6th	7th	8th	9th	10th	...	144th	145th	146th	147th	148th	149th	150th
150	149	148	147	146	145	144	143	142	141	...	7	6	5	4	3	2	1

From 2014 season each team's best two rounds from the 6 hour races are added to their result from the 24 hour race to determine their Series Championship total. From 2016, points are allocated by category result instead of overall result.

== Events ==
=== Mount Gambier, South Australia ===
McNamara Park Circuit
- Location: Mount Gambier, South Australia

Inaugural Layout (2014–present)
- Length: 2.4 km (1.5 mi)
- Turns: 8

This race, currently held in April is eight hours long and is held at McNamara Park, just outside of Mount Gambier, South Australia, on a 2.4 km closed circuit. The track made its debut in 2014 as an 8-hour non-series race before being integrated into the main series in 2017.

=== Loxton, South Australia ===
Loxton Street Circuit
- Location: Loxton, South Australia

Inaugural Layout (2014–present)
- Length: 1.37 km (0.85 mi)
- Turns: 8
- Race lap record: 1:50.842 (Norwood Morialta / Focus)

This race was a six-hour race and took place at Loxton, South Australia on a 1.37 km street circuit that incorporates Loxton's large centre roundabout. The track made its debut for the 2014 season. There was a slight modification made to the track at the 2018 race. This track heavily favours lighter bikes due to the climb on the southern side of the track. The race was removed from the AHPVSS roster in 2020 as a result of the COVID-19 pandemic.

==== Fastest Individual Racing Lap ====
Inaugural Layout
	Category	Team	Bike	Date Set	Lap Time	Ave Speed
4	Community	(South Australia) Norwood Morialta	Focus	2014	1:50.842	49.692 km/h
3	Senior Secondary	(South Australia) Xavier College	Green Edge	2014	2:08.926	42.722 km/h
3	Senior Secondary [G]	(South Australia) Pembroke School	The Devil Wears Cleats	2015	2:21.975	38.796 km/h
2	Junior Secondary	(South Australia) Pembroke School	Eric The Half Bee	2015	2:08.139	42.985 km/h
2	Junior Secondary [G]	(South Australia) Modbury High School	Pink Panther	2014	3:14.259	28.354 km/h
1	Primary School	(South Australia) Highgate School	Highgate Hotrod	2015	2:39.688	34.492 km/h
1	Primary School [G]	(South Australia) Craigburn Primary	Craigburn Crewsers-2	2014	3:33.246	25.829 km/h

==== Greatest Race Distance ====
Inaugural Layout
	Category	Team	Bike	Date Set	Laps	Distance	Ave Speed	Ave Lap Time
4	Community	(Victoria (state)) Tri-Sled Racing	Team 1	2014	153	234.09 km	39.015 km/h	2:21.2
3	Senior Secondary	(Victoria (state)) EDEC	Fire Breathing Rubber Duckies	2014	149	227.97 km	37.995 km/h	2:25.0
3	Senior Secondary [G]	(South Australia) Pembroke School	The Devil Wears Cleats	2015	110	168.3 km	28.05 km/h	3:16.4
2	Junior Secondary	(South Australia) Pembroke School	Eric The Half Bee	2015	142	217.26 km	36.21 km/h	2:32.1
2	Junior Secondary [G]	(South Australia) Seymour College	Blackwatch Racing	2014	88	134.64 km	22.44 km/h	4:05.5
1	Primary School	(South Australia) Highgate School	Highgate Hotrod	2014	104	159.12 km	26.52 km/h	3:27.7
1	Primary School [G]	(South Australia) Craigburn Primary	Craigburn Cruisers	2014	78	119.34 km	19.89 km/h	4:36.9

=== Victoria Park, Adelaide, South Australia ===
Victoria Park Criterium
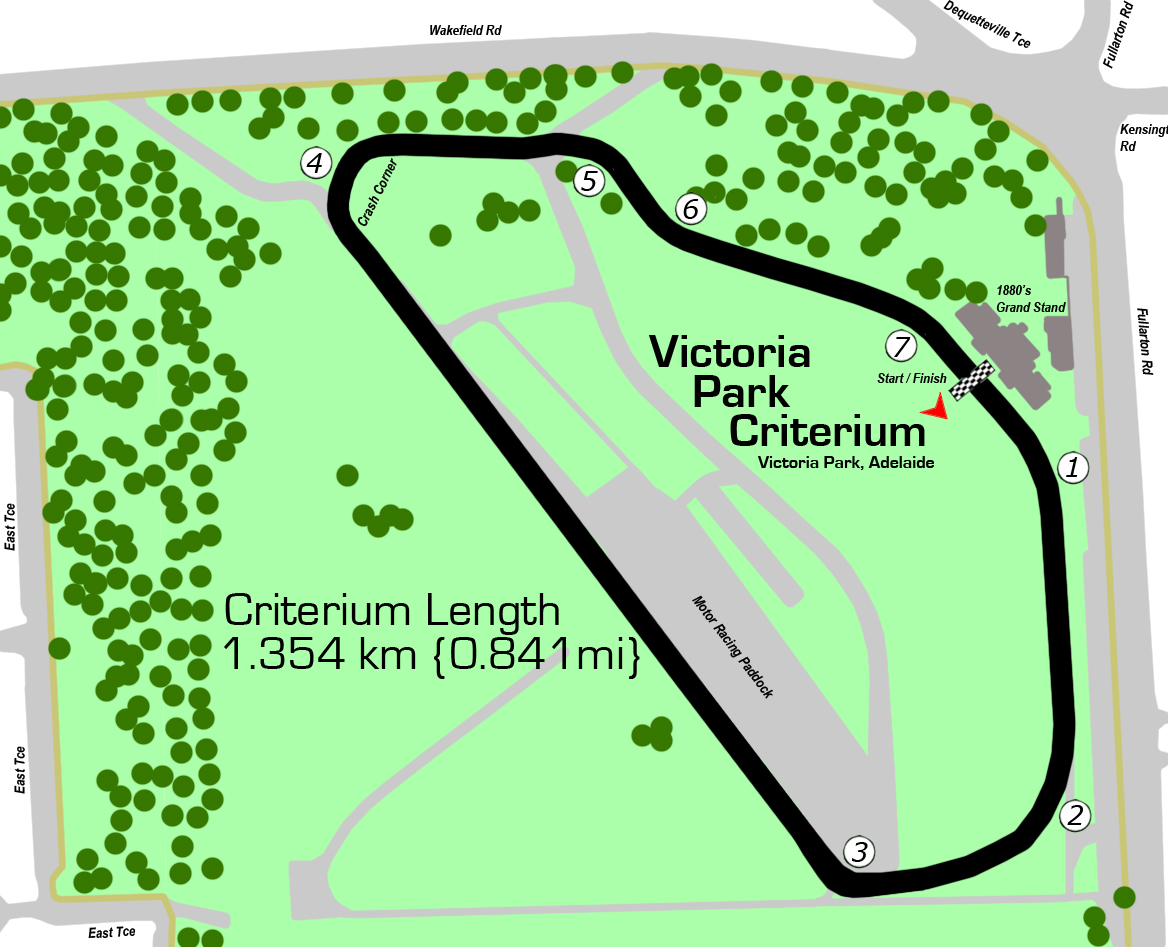
- Location: Victoria Park, Adelaide

Criterium (2013–present)
- Length: 1.354 km (0.841 mi)
- Turns: 6
- Race lap record: 1:22.33 (Aurora Racing / Aurora)

Short Circuit (2009–2012)
- Length: 1.114 km (0.692 mi)
- Race lap record: 1:17.10 (Tru Blu / Tru Blu Racing)

Inaugural Layout (2003–2008)
- Length: 1.540 km (0.957 mi)
- Race lap record: 2:05.30 (ExPats / ExPats Racing)

Two races, currently held in June and July, are six hours long and take place at Victoria Park, Adelaide on a closed-criterium track which is 1.354 km long. The fastest teams can achieve distances of over 250 km during these races. The Victoria Park track is now in its third incarnation. Prior to 2009 the track included an uphill segment of Wakefield Rd. From 2009 to 2012 the track used the southern hairpin and start line of the Adelaide Street Circuit and a new section running parallel to Wakefield Street. Late in 2012 it was confirmed by the Adelaide City Council that the redevelopment of Victoria Park had been given the green light. The redevelopment now includes an extension to the short track to take it past the heritage grandstand present on the site. This track heavily favors the most aerodynamic bikes due to the lack of slow corners.

==== Fastest Individual Racing Lap ====
Criterium Track
	Category	Team	Bike	Date Set	Lap Time	Ave Speed
4	Community	(Victoria (state)) Aurora Racing	Aurora	2016 Rd 2	1:22.33	59.203 km/h
3	Senior Secondary	(South Australia) Pembroke School	Brian	2015 Rd 2	1.36.6	50.46 km/h
3	Senior Secondary [G]	(Victoria (state)) Pembroke School	The Devil Wears Cleats	2015 Rd 2	1.52.2	43.433 km/h
2	Junior Secondary	(South Australia) Pembroke School	Eric The Half Bee	2015 Rd 2	1.36.5	50.51 km/h
2	Junior Secondary [G]	(South Australia) Seymour College	Blackwatch Racing	2014 Rd 2	2:04.014	39.3 km/h
1	Primary School	(South Australia) Highgate School	Highgate Hotrod	2015 Rd 2	1:56.2	41.95 km/h
1	Primary School [G]	(Victoria (state)) Murrayville CC	HOT M	2013 Rd 2	2:08.211	38.08 km/h

Short Circuit
	Category	Team	Bike	Date Set	Lap Time	Ave Speed
4	Community	(Victoria (state)) Tru Blu Racing	Tru Blu	2009 Rd 2	1:17.10	53.23 km/h
3	Senior Secondary	(Victoria (state)) Bendigo SSC	Just Razzing	2011 Rd 2	1.22.64	49.82 km/h
3	Senior Secondary [G]	(Victoria (state)) EDEC HPV Team	Victorious Secret	2011 Rd 1	1:39.10	41.41 km/h
2	Junior Secondary	(Victoria (state)) EDEC HPV Team	Fire Breathing Rubber Duckies	2012 Rd 2	1:34.50	43.43 km/h
2	Junior Secondary [G]	(South Australia) Scotch College, Adelaide	SCR-1	2010 Rd 2	1:45.70	38.83 km/h
1	Primary School	(South Australia) Aberfoyle Park Primary	Computer Hospital Screamer	2010 Rd 2	1:39.30	41.33 km/h
1	Primary School [G]	(South Australia) Crafers Primary School	Crafers Comet	2010 Rd 2	2:03.15	33.33 km/h

==== Greatest Race Distance ====
Criterium Track
	Category	Team	Bike	Date Set	Laps	Distance	Ave Speed	Ave Lap Time
4	Community	(Victoria (state)) Platt Racing	Trump Trikes	2014 Rd 3	215	291.11 km	48.52 km/h	1:40.47
3	Senior Secondary	(South Australia) Pembroke School	Tis But A Scratch	2013 Rd 2	190	257.26 km	42.88 km/h	1:53.68
3	Senior Secondary [G]	(South Australia) Pembroke School	The Devil Wears Cleats	2015 Rd 2	158	213.93 km	35.66 km/h	2:16.7
2	Junior Secondary	(South Australia) Pembroke School	Eric The Half Bee	2015 Rd 2	191	258.614 km	43.102 km/h	1:53.09
2	Junior Secondary [G]	(South Australia) Scotch College	SCR-1	2014 Rd 3	149	201.70 km	33.67 km/h	2:25.70
1	Primary School	(South Australia) Crafers Primary	The Edge	2014 Rd 3	147	199.04 km	33.17 km/h	2:26.94
1	Primary School [G]	(Victoria (state)) Murrayville CC	HOT M	2013 Rd 2	136	176.02 km	30.69 km/h	2:38.82

Short Circuit
	Category	Team	Bike	Date Set	Laps	Distance	Ave Speed	Ave Lap Time
4	Community	(Victoria (state)) Aurora Racing	Aurora Racing	2012 Rd 1	234	260.68 km	43.45 km/h	1:32.28
3	Senior Secondary	(Victoria (state)) Bendigo SSC	Just Razzing	2011 Rd 2	221	245.31 km	40.89 km/h	1:38:73
3	Senior Secondary [G]	(Victoria (state)) EDEC HPV Team	Victorious Secret	2011 Rd 2	178	202.92 km	33.82 km/h	2:01.32
2	Junior Secondary	(South Australia) Aberfoyle Hub	Raging Senior Hubcaps	2011 Rd 2	189	215.46 km	35.91 km/h	1:54.24
2	Junior Secondary [G]	(South Australia) Scotch College	SCR-1	2011 Rd 2	163	185.82 km	30.97 km/h	2:12.48
1	Primary School	(South Australia) Aberfoyle Park	Computer Hospital Screamer	2010 Rd 2	169	192.66 km	32.11 km/h	2:07.8
1	Primary School [G]	(South Australia) Handorf Primary	Handorf Hornets Red	2009 Rd 2	159	181.26 km	30.21 km/h	2:15.84

Inaugural Layout
	Category	Bike/Team	State	Date Set	Laps	Distance	Ave Speed	Ave Lap Time
4	Community	(South Australia) TAFE SA	Blue Shift	2008 Rd 2	147	226.38 km	37.73 km/h	2:26.9
3	Senior Secondary	(Victoria (state)) Flora Hill SC	Old Bearded Mate	2008 Rd 2	134	206.36 km	34.39 km/h	2:41.2
3	Senior Secondary [G]	(South Australia) Loxton High School	Blur 1	2007 Rd 2	103	158.62 km	26.44 km/h	3:29.7
2	Junior Secondary	(South Australia) Gleeson College	Scorpio	2007 Rd 2	126	194.03 km	32.34 km/h	2:51.4
2	Junior Secondary [G]	(South Australia) Walford Primary	WR1	2007 Rd 2	95	146.3 km	24.38 km/h	3:47.4
1	Primary School	(South Australia) Aberfoyle Hub	Flying Hubcaps	2007 Rd 2	107	164.78 km	27.46 km/h	3:21.9
1	Primary School [G]	(South Australia) Aberfoyle Hub	Cruising Hubcaps	2008 Rd 2	94	144.76	24.13 km/h	3:49.8

=== Busselton, Western Australia ===
Busselton Street Circuit
- Location: Busselton, Western Australia

Inaugural Layout (2014–present)
- Surface: Asphalt
- Length: 0.85 km (0.53 mi)

In 2014, a new race on an 850 m street circuit in Busselton, Western Australia was announced. It is currently the only event in the AHPVSS outside of South Australia. It was initially a non-series round used to promote HPV racing in Western Australia. This was upgraded into a series event in 2018. The track is located mainly in a carpark on the foreshore of Busselton. It is tight and twisty with three hairpins. Since 2014 it has been a 6 hour race, but the Busselton City Council is in talks with the AIPP about the possibility of holding a 24 hour event.

=== Murray Bridge, South Australia ===
Murray Bridge Pedal Prix Circuit
- 2004–2016 layout
- Location: Murray Bridge, South Australia
- Capacity: 35,000
- Major events: 24 Hour

Hairpin removed (2016–present)
- Length: 1.72 km (1.07 mi)
- Turns: 10

Crash Corner altered (2004–2015)
- Length: 2.061 km (1.281 mi)
- Turns: 15
- Race lap record: 2:10.835 (Tru Blu / Tru Blu Racing) (Tru Blu / Tru Blu Racing, 2013)

Hairpin added (2000–2003)
- Length: 2.101 km (1.306 mi)
- Turns: 14

Inaugural Layout (1997–1999)
- Length: 1.695 km (1.053 mi)
- Turns: 7

The Australian HPV Super Series concludes in September with what is considered to be the premier HPV event in the country, the 24-hour, final race at Sturt Reserve in Murray Bridge. The event now attracts over 30,000 spectators and participants annually, becoming an economic boom for the town. It attracts the best teams from all over the country to what is considered the toughest and most competitive race. The closed-circuit track is, as of 2016, 1.7 km long containing a series of left and right hand corners, fast straights and challenging corners. When flooded with over 200 teams it makes for genuinely tricky and exciting racing, The elite teams may cover over 1,000 km (620 mi) during the race. The race starts at 12:00 pm on Saturday and concludes 24 hours later. (note: In 2007 the race was stopped early due to gale-force winds, and in 2017 the race started 4 hours later than the scheduled start also due to strong winds).

During the first race at Murray Bridge in 1997, the track followed the roads that bordered Sturt Reserve in a closed circuit. In 2000, the Northern Hairpin along Olympic Drive and Janesh Road was added, lengthening the track by 366 metres. In 2004 the corner leading up to the main straight was transformed to its current shape (shortening the track by 40m). This corner has had various sponsors names associated with it, and is currently called 'Belotti Corner,' but it is known popularly among riders and spectators alike as "Crash Corner". The Southern Straight was resurfaced in 2011, removing the roughest section of the track. In 2016, the track was shortened to its current form, by-passing the Northern Hairpin due to the mills on that section of Janesh Road having to remain open during the event.

This track requires bikes to have good aerodynamics, minimal weight and decent handling.

==== Friday Qualifier & Saturday Shootout ====
2013 Top 15 Shootout
GP.	Category	No.	Team	Bike	Fairing	Lap Time	Average Speed
1	Community	85	(Victoria (state)) Tru Blu Racing	Tru Blu	John Taylor Bullet	2:10.853	56.702 km/h
2	Community	1	(Victoria (state)) Aurora Racing	Aurora	Team Built	2:16.309	54.432 km/h
3	Senior Secondary	bgcolor="#FFFFFF" 108	(Victoria (state)) Mount Eliza SC	Bite Me	Team Built	2:25.698	50.925 km/h
4	Senior Secondary	bgcolor="#FFFFFF" 179	(South Australia) Rostrevor College	Eddy 2	Team Built	2:33.805	48.240 km/h
5	Junior Secondary	bgcolor="#FFFF00" 249	(Victoria (state)) Bendigo SEC	She Floats	Team Built	2:36.226	47.493 km/h
6	Junior Secondary	bgcolor="#FFFF00" 217	(South Australia) Loxton High School	A Little Blurry	Trisled Aquila	2:38.691	46.755 km/h
7	Community	102	(South Australia) Dirty Mongrel Racing	Unhinged	John Taylor Bullet	2:41.306	45.997 km/h
8	Junior Secondary	bgcolor="#FFFF00" 248	(South Australia) Wudinna Area School	Extreme Eyre	Ballistic Outlaw	2:43.177	45.486 km/h
9	Senior Secondary	bgcolor="#FFFFFF" 45	(Victoria (state)) Bendigo SSC	Assault with a Quiche	Team Built	2:44.646	45.064 km/h
10	Junior Secondary [G]	bgcolor="#FFFF00" 6	(South Australia) Scotch College	SCR-1	Sutton Stelvio	2:54.790	42.449 km/h
11	Primary School	bgcolor="#FFA500" 134	(South Australia) East Para Primary	Chain Gang	Trisled Kerstel	3:01.795	40.810 km/h
12	Primary School [G]	bgcolor="#FFA500" 84	(Victoria (state)) Murrayville Community College	HOT M	Team Built	3:06.345	39.820 km/h
13	Community	bgcolor="#FFA500" 99	(South Australia) St Marks Lutheran	Lutheran Lightning	Ozone Standard	3:16.634	37.733 km/h
14	Senior Secondary [G]	bgcolor="#FFFFFF" 62	(Victoria (state)) Bendigo Senior Secondary College	Trevors Great Escape	Team Built	No Time	N/A
15	Primary School	bgcolor="#FFA500" 4	(South Australia) Highgate School	Highgate Hot Rod	Team Built	No Time	N/A

In 2005, a timed Friday night practice session was introduced. This session is used to determine the grid positions for the start of the race the following day. This also included the introduction of a Top 12 Shootout where the three fastest teams from each category were given the opportunity to set a lap time on a clear track on Saturday morning before the start of the race to determine the top 12 positions on the grid.

In 2008, the shootout was expanded to a Top 15 shootout to include the fastest all female team from categories 1, 2 and 3. The shootout has quickly become a crowd favourite since its introduction. Large crowds gather around the track to cheer on the fastest teams as they are given the opportunity to push their trikes to the limit on a clear track. Top teams exceed 70 km/h on the main straight during their flying lap.

==== Murray Bridge Records ====
Fastest Individual Qualifying/Shootout Lap
	Category	Team	Bike	Date Set	Lap Time	Ave Speed
4	Community	(Victoria (state)) Tru Blu Racing	Tru Blu	2013	2:10.853	56.7 km/h
3	Senior Secondary	(Victoria (state)) Bendigo SSC	Just Razzing	2011	2:17.46	54.11 km/h
3	Senior Secondary [G]	(Victoria (state)) EDEC HPV Team	Victorious Secret	2011	3:07.13	39.60 km/h
2	Junior Secondary	(South Australia) Pembroke School	Eric the Half Bee	2014	2:29.13	51.9 km/h
2	Junior Secondary [G]	(South Australia) Wudinna Area School	Venus	2012	2:54.71	42.45 km/h
1	Primary School	(South Australia) Aberfoyle Hub Primary School	Flying Hubcaps	2011	3:07.00	41.39 km/h
1	Primary School [G]	(Victoria (state)) Murrayville CC	HOT M	2013	3:06.345	39.82 km/h

Fastest Individual Racing Lap
	Category	Team	Bike	Date Set	Lap Time	Ave Speed
4	Community	(Victoria (state)) Platt Racing	Trump Trikes	2014	2:18.457	53.59 km/h
3	Senior Secondary	(Victoria (state)) Bendigo Senior Secondary College	Gunna Have a Bad Time	2012	2:20.243	52.90 km/h
3	Senior Secondary [G]	(South Australia) Wudinna Area School	Venus	2013	2:58.476	41.57 km/h
2	Junior Secondary	(South Australia) Pembroke School	Paradox	2013	2:46.245	44.63 km/h
2	Junior Secondary [G]	(South Australia) Wudinna Area School	Venus	2012	3:00.70	41.04 km/h
1	Primary School	(South Australia) Aberfoyle Hub Primary School	Flying Hubcaps	2011	3:08.50	39.34 km/h
1	Primary School [G]	(Victoria (state)) Murrayville CC	HOT M	2013	3:23.302	36.50 km/h

Greatest Race Distance
	Category	Team	Bike	Date Set	Laps	Distance	Ave Speed	Ave Lap Time
4	Community	(Victoria (state)) Platt Racing	Trump Trikes	2014	533	1098.51 km	45.77 km/h	2:42.10
3	Senior Secondary	(Victoria (state)) Bendigo Senior Secondary College	Gunna Have a Bad Time	2012	477	983.10 km	40.96 km/h	3:01.13
3	Senior Secondary [G]	(Victoria (state)) Bendigo SSC	Trevors' Great Escape	2013	390	803.79 km	33.491 km/h	3:41.54
2	Junior Secondary	(South Australia) Pembroke School	Eric the Half Bee	2014	416	857.91 km	35.71 km/h	3:28.10
2	Junior Secondary [G]	(South Australia) Wudinna Area School	Venus	2012	374	770.81 km	32.08 km/h	3:51.02
1	Primary School	(South Australia) Highgate School	Highgate Hot Rod	2012	355	731.66 km	30.50 km/h	4:03.14
1	Primary School [G]	(Victoria (state)) Murrayville CC	Hot M	2013	320	659.52 km	27.48 km/h	4.30.00

Outright Winners Statistics
Year	Team	Speed (km/h)	Laps	Distance (km)	Average Lap
1997	(Victoria (state)) Mount Eliza SC	20.6	291	493.245	4:56.00
1998	(Victoria (state)) Trisled				
1999	(Victoria (state)) Wonthaggi SC				
2000	(South Australia) Team Bellotti	26.0	368	623.76	3:54.69
2001	(South Australia) Team Bellotti	28.3	400	678	3:35.60
2002	(Victoria (state)) Trisled	35.0	400	840.4	3:36.10
2003	(Victoria (state)) Bendigo Youth Racing	33.9	387	813.1	3:43.10
2004	(Victoria (state)) Bendigo Youth Racing	36.7	427	880.05	3:22.34
2005	(South Australia) Blueshift/HSC	36.8	428	882.11	3:21.87
2006	(South Australia) Team Ballistic	36.9	430	886.23	3:20.93
2007	(South Australia) Blueshift/TAFE SA	37.4	435*	896.54	3:18.62
2008	(Victoria (state)) Tru Blu Racing	42.6	475	978.98	2:54.32
2009	(Victoria (state)) Bendigo Youth Racing	40.0	466	960.43	3:04.61
2010	(Victoria (state)) Tru Blu Racing	40.2	468	964.55	3:04.41
2011	(Victoria (state)) Team Phantom	42.7	497	1024.32	2:53.84
2012	(Victoria (state)) Tru Blu Racing	44.8	522	1075.84	2:45.52
2013	(Victoria (state)) Tru Blu Racing	45.0	524	1079.96	2:44.89
2014	(Victoria (state)) Platt Racing	45.8	533	1098.51	2:42.11

== Winners 24 Hour Pedal Prix - Murray Bridge ==
=== 1997 ===
1997
	Category	Team	Trike	Laps
4	Community	(Victoria (state)) Team Reflex	Reflex	287
3	Senior Secondary	(South Australia) Pembroke School	Super Road Dog	251
2	Junior Secondary	(Victoria (state)) Mount Eliza Secondary College	Mercury	291
1	Primary School	(South Australia) Magill Primary School	Razors Edge	237

=== 1998 ===
1998
	Category	Team	Trike	Laps
4	Community	(Victoria (state)) Trisled	FastBack	
3	Senior Secondary	Wonthaggi Secondary College	Senior Wizard	
2	Junior Secondary	Wonthaggi Secondary College	Junior Wizard	
1	Primary School	(South Australia) Walford Anglican School	WR1	

=== 1999 ===
1999
	Category	Team	Trike	Laps
4	Community	(Victoria (state)) Wonthaggi Secondary School	Team Dragon	
3	Senior Secondary	(South Australia) Portland Secondary College	Team Prodigy	
2	Junior Secondary	(South Australia) Marryatville High School	Perpetrator	
4	Primary School	(South Australia) Seymour College	Seymour Parks	

=== 2000 ===
2000
	Category	No.	Team	Trike	Laps	VM.
4	Community	53	(South Australia) Team Bellotti	EVO3 BY 1	368	32
3	Senior Secondary					
2	Junior Secondary					
1	Primary School		(South Australia) Aberfoyle Hub School	Cruising Hubcaps		

=== 2001 ===
2001
	Category	No.	Team	Trike	Laps	VM.
4	Community	50	(South Australia) Team Bellotti	EVO3 BY 1	400	32
3	Senior Secondary		(South Australia) Norwood Morialta	Astro 131	367	
2	Junior Secondary		(South Australia) Gleeson College	Scorpio	327	
1	Primary School		(South Australia) Aberfoyle Hub School	Screaming Hubcaps	300	

=== 2002 ===
2002
	Category	No.	Team	Trike	Laps	VM.
4	Community	189	(Victoria (state)) Trisled	Sorcerer	400	
3	Senior Secondary					
2	Junior Secondary					
1	Primary School		(South Australia) Aberfoyle Hub School			

=== 2003 ===
2003
	Category	No.	Team	Trike	Laps	VM.
4	Community	195	(Victoria (state)) Bendigo Youth Racing	Bendigo Bank BYR	387	0:10
3	Senior Secondary	125	(South Australia) Gleeson College	Taurus		
2	Junior Secondary	75	(Victoria (state)) Berwick Secondary College	Firebug		
1	Primary School	144	(South Australia) Aberfoyle Hub School	Lightning Hubcaps		

Special Note Bendigo Youth Racings victory over Team Ballistic was the closest in the events history with only 10 seconds separating them after 24 hours.

=== 2004 ===
2004
	Category	No.	Team	Trike	Laps	VM.
4	Community	195	(Victoria (state)) Bendigo Youth Racing	Bendigo Bank BYR	427	
3	Senior Secondary	114	(Victoria (state)) Berwick Secondary College	Firestorm	409	
2	Junior Secondary	60	(South Australia) Loxton High School	Blur 3	385	
1	Primary School		(South Australia) Aberfoyle Hub School	Burning Hubcaps	342	

=== 2005 ===
2005
	Category	No.	Team	Trike	Laps	VM.
4	Community	34	(South Australia) Hamilton Secondary College	Blueshift	428	13
3	Senior Secondary	30	(Victoria (state)) Berwick Secondary College	Firestorm		
2	Junior Secondary	235	(Victoria (state)) Flora Hill Secondary College	Beefcake Productions		6
1	Primary School	59	(South Australia) Aberfoyle Hub School	Burning Hubcaps		

=== 2006 ===
2006
	Category	No.	Team	Trike	Laps	VM.
4	Community	132	(South Australia) Ballistic	Ballistic	430	3
3	Senior Secondary	216	(Victoria (state)) Bendigo SSC	Grug	393	1
3	Senior Secondary [G]	65	(South Australia) Loxton High School	Blur 1	321	
2	Junior Secondary	159	(Victoria (state)) Flora Hill Secondary College	Gumberton	388	21
2	Junior Secondary [G]	208	(South Australia) Walford Anglican School	WR3	315	
1	Primary School	143	(South Australia) St Therese Primary School	Eco Racer	338	19
1	Primary School [G]	71	(South Australia) Aberfoyle Hub School	Cruising Hubcaps	279	

=== 2007 ===
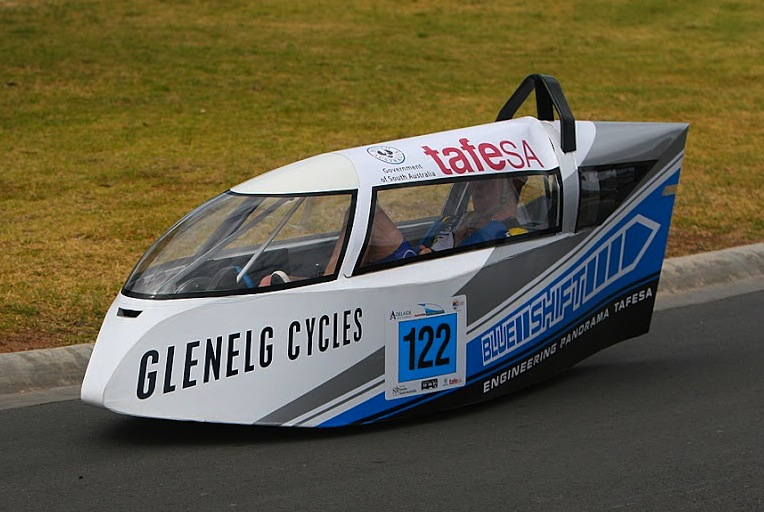
2007 Murray Bridge 24 Hour outright winner: Blueshift

2007
	Category	No.	Team	Trike	Laps	VM.
4	Community	122	(South Australia) TAFE SA	Blueshift	435	2
3	Senior Secondary	189	(Victoria (state)) Flora Hill Secondary College	Buff Duck	412	19
3	Senior Secondary [G]	105	(South Australia) Loxton High School	Blur 1	271	16
2	Junior Secondary	188	(Victoria (state)) Flora Hill Secondary College	Sardine Extreme	403	17
2	Junior Secondary [G]	33	(South Australia) Walford Anglican School	WR1	329	42
1	Primary School	207	(Victoria (state)) Weeroona College Bendigo	Fill	334	15
1	Primary School [G]	20	(South Australia) Aberfoyle Hub School	Cruising Hubcaps	274	16

Special Note The 2007 race was only 23 hours long as it had to be cut short by an hour due to gale force winds.

=== 2008 ===
2008
	Category	No.	Team	Trike	Laps	VM.
4	Community	13	(Victoria (state)) Tru Blu Racing	Tru Blu	475	1
3	Senior Secondary	77	(Victoria (state)) Flora Hill Secondary College	Old Bearded Mate	427	5
3	Senior Secondary [G]	44	(South Australia) Modbury High School	Pink Panther	314	7
2	Junior Secondary	62	(Victoria (state)) Flora Hill Secondary College	Brum	397	19
2	Junior Secondary [G]	185	(South Australia) Walford Anglican School	WR1	314	27
1	Primary School	215	(South Australia) Aberfoyle Hub School	Flying Hubcaps	339	6
1	Primary School [G]	222	(South Australia) Aberfoyle Hub School	Cruising Hubcaps	272	6

=== 2009 ===
2009
	Category	No.	Team	Trike	Laps	VM.
4	Community	49	(Victoria (state)) Bendigo Youth Racing	BY-09	466	7
3	Senior Secondary	243	(Victoria (state)) Woodleigh School Baxter	Helter Skelter	396	6
3	Senior Secondary [G]	135	(South Australia) Loxton High School	Blur 1	321	9
2	Junior Secondary	178	(Victoria (state)) Weeroona College Bendigo	Silver Bullet II	379	9
2	Junior Secondary [G]	270	(South Australia) Walford Anglican School for Girls	WR1	314	30
1	Primary School	177	(Victoria (state)) Weeroona College Bendigo	Bullet Proof	334	17
1	Primary School [G]	61	(South Australia) Aberfoyle Hub Primary School	Cruising Hubcaps	292	17

=== 2010 ===
2010
	Category	No.	Team	Trike	Laps	VM.
4	Community	149	(Victoria (state)) Tru Blu Racing	Tru Blu	468	2
3	Senior Secondary	171	(Victoria (state)) Bendigo SSC	Squirrel	422	17
3	Senior Secondary [G]	212	(South Australia) Loxton High School	Blur 1	340	42
2	Junior Secondary	119	(South Australia) Loxton High School	Blur 2	383	17
2	Junior Secondary [G]	71	(South Australia) Loreto College, Marryatville	Felicity	317	2
1	Primary School	68	(South Australia) Aberfoyle Hub Primary School	Flying Hubcaps	317	1
1	Primary School [G]	77	(South Australia) St Michaels Handorf	Hills Angels	243	6

=== 2011 ===
2011
	Category	No.	Team	Trike	Laps	VM.
4	Community	3	(Victoria (state)) Team Phantom	Re-newbi-ed	497	1
3	Senior Secondary	19	(South Australia) Pembroke School, Adelaide	Paradox	397	2
3	Senior Secondary [G]	13	(Victoria (state)) EDEC HPV Team	Victorious Secret	369	30
2	Junior Secondary	82	(Victoria (state)) Woodleigh School Baxter	Helter Skelter	397	4
2	Junior Secondary [G]	229	(South Australia) Wudinna Area School	Venus	365	28
1	Primary School	46	(South Australia) St Michaels Hahndorf	Hahndorf Hornets Red	353	10
1	Primary School [G]	187	(South Australia) Walford Anglican	WR4	246	8

=== 2012 ===
2012
	Category	No.	Team	Trike	Laps	VM.
4	Community	24	(Victoria (state)) Tru Blu Racing	Tru Blu	522	1
3	Senior Secondary	39	(Victoria (state)) Bendigo SSC	Gunna Have a Bad Time	477	37
3	Senior Secondary [G]	10	(Victoria (state)) EDEC HPV Team	Victorious Secret	360	4
2	Junior Secondary	9	(Victoria (state)) EDEC HPV Team	Fire Breathing Rubber Duckies	410	17
2	Junior Secondary [G]	225	(South Australia) Wudinna Area School	Venus	374	36
1	Primary School	87	(South Australia) Highgate Primary School	Highgate Hot Rod	355	3
1	Primary School [G]	186	(South Australia) Walford Anglican	WR4	272	65

=== 2013 ===
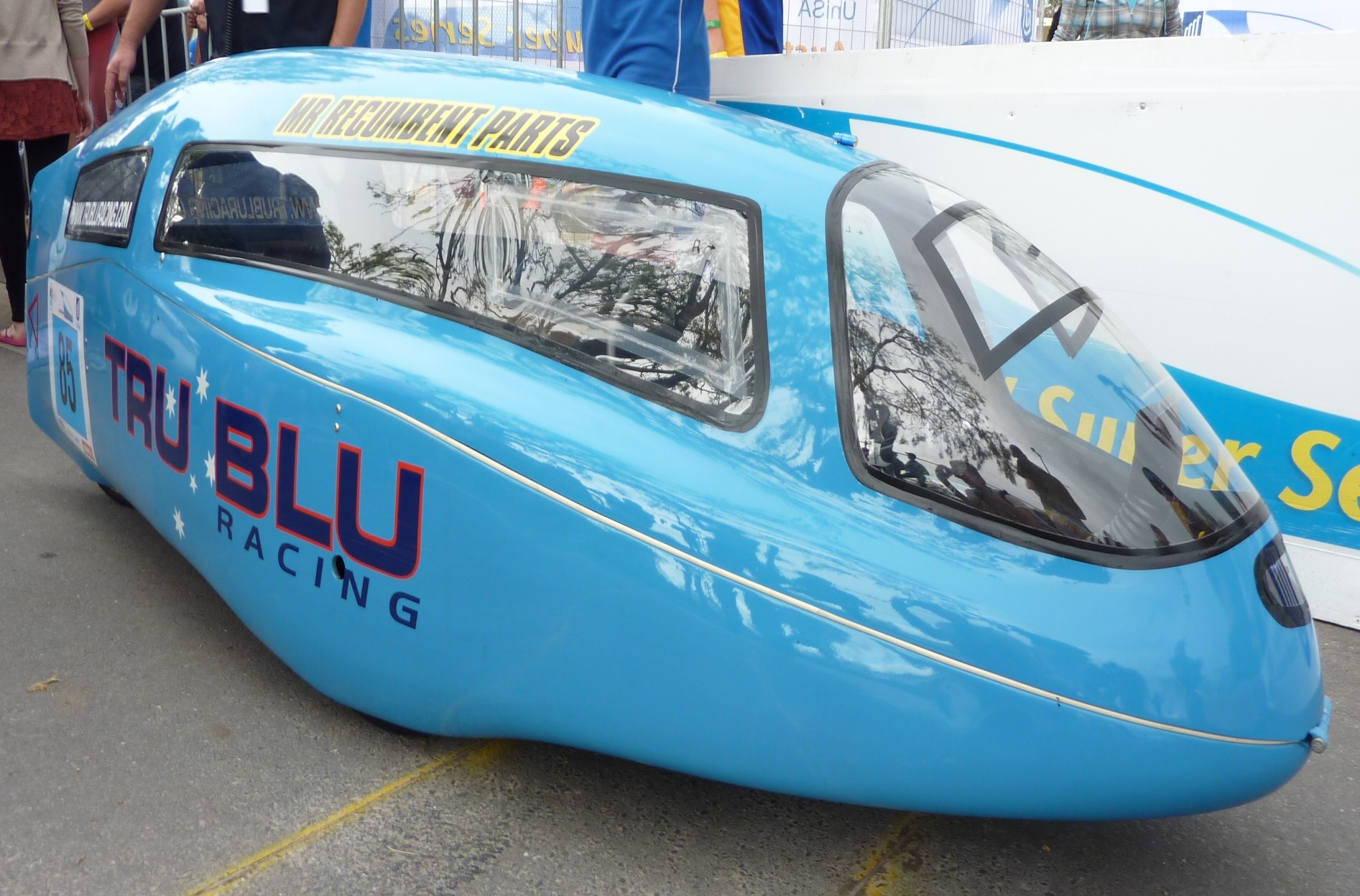
2013 Murray Bridge 24 Hour outright winner: Tru Blu

2013
	Category	No.	Team	Trike	Laps	VM.
4	Community	85	(Victoria (state)) Tru Blu Racing	Tru Blu	524	10
3	Senior Secondary	2	(South Australia) Pembroke School	Tis But A Scratch	461	13
3	Senior Secondary [G]	62	(Victoria (state)) Bendigo SSC	Trevors' Great Escape	390	3
2	Junior Secondary	9	(South Australia) Pembroke School	Paradox	404	2
2	Junior Secondary [G]	6	(South Australia) Scotch College	SCR-1	358	4
1	Primary School	121	(South Australia) Crafers Primary School	The Edge	345	11
1	Primary School [G]	84	(Victoria (state)) Murrayville CC	Hot M	320	38

=== 2014 ===
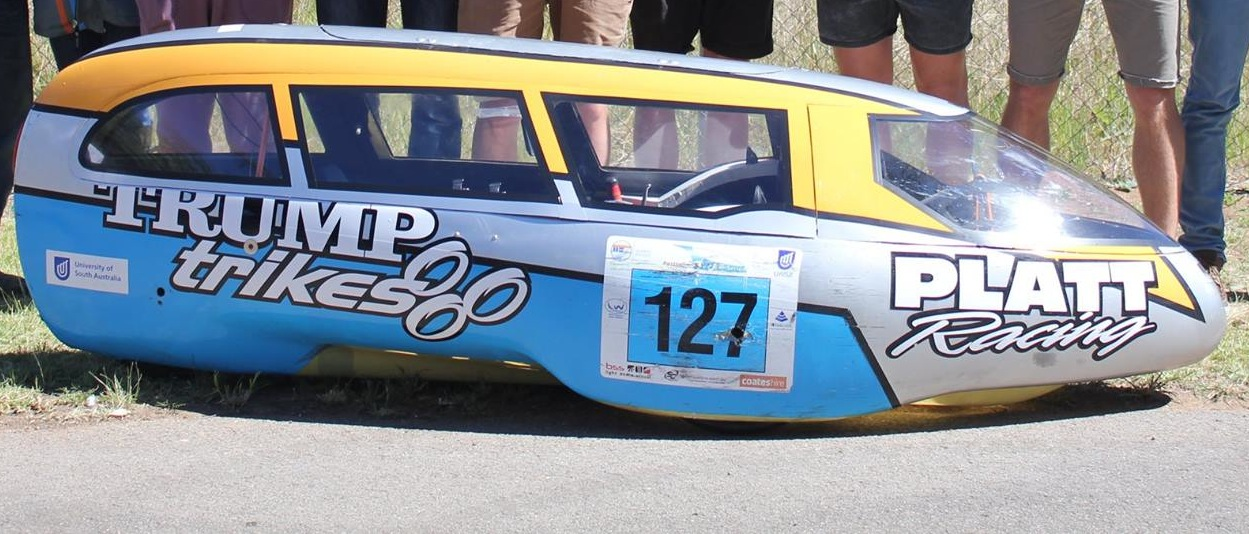
2014 Murray Bridge 24 Hour outright winner: Platt Racing

2014
	Category	No.	Team	Trike	Laps	VM.
4	Community	127	(Victoria (state)) Platt Racing	Trump Trikes	533	3
4	Community [G]	45	(Victoria (state)) EDEC HPV Racing Team	CWC	372	n/a
3	Senior Secondary	90	(Victoria (state)) Bendigo SSC	Grand Theft Mango	466	11
3	Senior Secondary [G]	41	(South Australia) Loxton High School	She's A Blur	333	8
2	Junior Secondary	11	(South Australia) Pembroke School	Eric The Half Bee	416	9
2	Junior Secondary [G]	6	(South Australia) Scotch College	SCR-1	360	18
1	Primary School	202	(South Australia) Highgate Primary School	Highgate Hot Rod	350	4
1	Primary School [G]	55	(South Australia) Seymour College	Blackwatch Racing Jnr	281	32

=== 2015 ===
2015
	Category	No.	Team	Trike	Laps	VM.
4	Community	74	(Victoria (state)) Aurora Racing	Aurora Racing	462	16
4	Community [G]	87	(Victoria (state)) Wattle Racing	Shes the Man	361	36
3	Senior Secondary	8	(South Australia) Pembroke School	Brian	405	24
3	Senior Secondary [G]	9	(South Australia) Pembroke School	The Devil Wears Cleats	339	28
2	Junior Secondary	3	(South Australia) Pembroke School	Eric The Half Bee	399	52
2	Junior Secondary [G]	6	(South Australia) Scotch College	SCR-1	331	13
1	Primary School	155	(South Australia) East Para Primary School	Crank Crew	311	2
1	Primary School [G]	52	(South Australia) Seymour College	Seymour 1	253	5

=== 2016 ===
2016
	Category	No.	Team	Trike	Laps	VM.
4	Community	99	(Victoria (state)) Aurora Racing	Aurora Racing	634	21
4	Community [G]	48	(Victoria (state)) Wattle Racing	Shes the Man	498	133
3	Senior Secondary	22	(Victoria (state)) Trisled	Trisled Development Team	560	30
3	Senior Secondary [G]	6	(South Australia) Pembroke School	The Devil Wears Cleats	469	43
2	Junior Secondary	3	(South Australia) Pembroke School	Boris	515	33
2	Junior Secondary [G]	7	(South Australia) Scotch College	SCR-1	417	9
1	Primary School	4	(South Australia) East Para Primary School	Crank Crew	439	32
1	Primary School [G]	305	(South Australia) Walford Anglican School	WR3	361	34

Special Note Due to the mill now operating during the race, a different track was used, removing the hairpin at the north of the course.

=== 2017 ===
2017
	Category	No.	Team	Trike	Laps	VM.
4	Community	76	(South Australia) Team Relentless	Trump Trikes	496	26
4	Community [G]	5	(Victoria (state)) Wattle Racing	Shes the Man	397	58
3	Senior Secondary	2	(Victoria (state)) Pembroke School	Eric	429	20
3	Senior Secondary [G]	189	(South Australia) Loxton High School	Shes a Blur	324	78
2	Junior Secondary	3	(South Australia) Pembroke School	Radar	404	27
2	Junior Secondary [G]	205	(Victoria (state)) Wudinna Area School	The Incredublettes	329	7
1	Primary School	53	(South Australia) Coromandel Valley Primary School	Black Betty	349	18
1	Primary School [G]	8	(South Australia) Walford Anglican School	WR4	270	33

=== 2018 ===
2018
	Category	No.	Team	Trike	Laps	VM.
C6	Open	1	(South Australia) Team Relentless	Trump Trikes	644	15
C6F	Open [F]	5	(Victoria (state)) Wattle Racing	Shes the Man	523	130
C5	Under 20	8	(Victoria (state)) Wattle Racing	Mater	565	18
C5F	Under 20 [F]	11	(Victoria (state)) GTrikes/Rode Rage	Trixie	482	110
C4	Under 17	10	(South Australia) Roof Rack City Racing	Billie Fleming	530	50
C4F	Under 17 [F]	44	(Victoria (state)) EDEC HPV Racing Team	Work In Progress	393	n/a
S3	Senior Secondary	103	(South Australia) Mount Barker High School	Barking Mad	571	37
S3F	Senior Secondary [F]	6	(South Australia) Loxton High School	Shes a Blur	433	14
S2	Junior Secondary	3	(South Australia) Pembroke School	Radar	537	31
S2F	Junior Secondary [F]	15	(South Australia) Pembroke School	The Devil Wears Cleats	475	23
S1	Primary School	71	(South Australia) Highgate Primary School	HotRod	474	22
S1F	Primary School [F]	315	(South Australia) Horsham West & Haven Primary School	Wimmera Diamonds	334	24

=== 2023 ===
2023
	Category	Team	Trike	Laps
4	Community	(Victoria (state)) Trump Trikes	Trump	
3	Senior Secondary	Pembroke	Centurion	
2	Junior Secondary	Pembroke	Phoenix	
1	Primary School	(South Australia) Walford Anglican School	WR1	

== Previous Championships ==
2003 Series Champions
Category	Bike	Team	Round 1 Points	Round 2 Points	Round 3 Points	Total Points
4 – Community						
3 – Senior School						
2 – Middle School						
1 – Primary School						

2004 Series Champions
Category	Bike	Team	Round 1 Points	Round 2 Points	Round 3 Points	Total Points
4 – Community	D&C	(South Australia) DAS Racing/William Light R - 12 School				
3 – Senior School						
2 – Middle School						
1 – Primary School						

2005 Series Champions
Category	Bike	Team	Round 1 Points	Round 2 Points	Round 3 Points	Total Points
4 – Community	BlueShift	(South Australia) Hamilton Secondary College				
3 – Senior School						
2 – Middle School						
1 – Primary School						

=== 2006 Championship ===
Series Champions
Category	Bike	Team	Round 1 Points	Round 2 Points	Round 3 Points	Total Points
4 – Community	BALLISTIC	(South Australia) BALLISTIC	110	145	214	469
3 – Senior School	Sagero	(South Australia) Heathfield High School	104	140	202	446
3 – Senior School [G]	Blur 1	(South Australia) Loxton High School	88	120	185	393
2 – Middle School	Scorpio	(South Australia) Gleeson College	103	138	204	445
2 – Middle School [G]	WR3	(South Australia) Walford Anglican School for Girls	0	112	176	288
1 – Primary School	Flying Hubcaps 1	(South Australia) Aberfoyle Hub Primary School	83	119	165	367
1 – Primary School [G]	Cruising Hubcaps 2	(South Australia) Aberfoyle Hub Primary School	58	89	141	288

Category 4
Pos	Team	Bike	VR1 (South Australia)	VR2 (South Australia)	MB3 (South Australia)	Pts	Dif
1	(South Australia) Ballistic	Ballistic	110 (1)	145 (1)	214 (1)	469	
2	(South Australia) Hamilton Secondary College	Blueshift	109 (2)	144 (2)	211 (4)	464	-5
3	(South Australia) TVR/Adelaide Hills HPV's	Lucky #7	107 (5)	141 (5)	212 (3)	460	-9
4	(Victoria (state)) Australian Made HPVRT	Australian Made	108 (3)	137 (9)	207 (8)	452	-17
5	(South Australia) William Light R-12 School	DAS Racing	106 (4)	143 (3)	196 (19)	445	-24
11	(Victoria (state)) Bendigo Youth Racing	BY-06	DNS	DNS	213 (2)	213	-256

Category 3
Pos	Team	Bike	VR1 (South Australia)	VR2 (South Australia)	MB3 (South Australia)	Pts	Dif
1	(South Australia) Heathfield High	Sagero	104 (7)	140 (6)	202 (13)	446	
2	(South Australia) Westminster School	The Calais	102 (9)	139 (7)	203 (12)	444	-2
3	(South Australia) Euduna Area School	Smokin	95 (16)	130 (16)	187 (28)	412	-34
4	(South Australia) Aberfoyle Hub School	Senior Hubcaps	96 (15)	128 (18)	186 (29)	410	-36

Category 2
Pos	Team	Bike	VR1 (South Australia)	VR2 (South Australia)	MB3 (South Australia)	Pts	Dif
1	(South Australia) Gleeson College	Scorpio	103 (8)	138 (8)	204 (11)	445	
2	(South Australia) Loxton High School	Blur 3	99 (12)	135 (11)	201 (14)	435	-10
3	(South Australia) Heathfield High	Peter Shearer	90 (21)	129 (17)	191 (24)	410	-35
5	(South Australia) Hub Racing Team	HRT 77	98 (13)	131 (15)	172 (43)	401	-44
19	(South Australia) Hamilton Secondary College	HSV 1	97 (14)	132 (14)	31 (184)	260	-185
27	(Victoria (state)) Flora Hill SC	Gumbletron	DNS	DNS	208 (7)	408	-237

Category 1
Pos	Team	Bike	VR1 (South Australia)	VR2 (South Australia)	MB3 (South Australia)	Pts	Dif
1	(South Australia) Aberfoyle Hub School	Flying Hubcaps	83 (28)	119 (27)	165 (50)	367	
2	(South Australia) Immanuel College	Fire	63 (48)	99 (47)	169 (46)	331	-36
3	(South Australia) St Michaels Lutheran	Hahndorf Hornets Silver	54 (57)	90 (56)	150 (65)	294	-73
5	(South Australia) Westbourne Park Primary	Airborne	72 (39)	34 (112)	147 (68)	253	-114
16	(Victoria (state)) St Therese	Eco Racer	DNS	DNS	193 (22)	193	-174
18	(Victoria (state)) Maiden Gully Primary	Ziptar	DNS	DNS	180 (35)	180	-187

=== 2007 Championship ===
Series Champions
Category	Bike	Team	Round 1 Points	Round 2 Points	Round 3 Points	Total Points
4 – Community	Team Ballistic	(South Australia) Murray Bridge Telstra Racing	130	160	223	513
3 – Senior School	Sagero	(South Australia) Heathfield High School	122	155	213	490
3 – Senior School [G]	Blur 1	(South Australia) Loxton High School	99	127	135	361
2 – Middle School	Scorpio	(South Australia) Gleeson College	120	153	212	485
2 – Middle School [G]	WR1	(South Australia) Walford Anglican School for Girls	0	106	192	298
1 – Primary School	Flying Hubcaps 1	(South Australia) Aberfoyle Hub Primary School	103	133	185	421
1 – Primary School [G]	Cruising Hubcaps	(South Australia) Aberfoyle Hub Primary School	77	85	134	296*
WR1; Walford Anglican School; Category 2 [G]

Category 4
Pos	Team	Bike	VR1 (South Australia)	VR2 (South Australia)	MB3 (South Australia)	Pts	Dif
1	(South Australia) Murray Bridge Telstra Racing	Ballistic	130 (1)	160 (1)	223 (2)	513	
2	(Victoria (state)) Trisled Racing	Trisled	128 (3)	157 (4)	221 (4)	506	-7
3	(Victoria (state)) Deakin University	Phantom	129 (2)	156 (5)	219 (6)	504	-9
5	(South Australia) William Light R-12 School	Das Racing	127 (4)	158 (3)	216 (9)	501	-12
10	(South Australia) TAFE SA	Blueshift	DNS	159 (2)	224 (1)	383	-130
14	(Victoria (state)) Tru Blu Racing	Tru Blu	DNS	DNS	222 (3)	222	-291

Category 3
Pos	Team	Bike	VR1 (South Australia)	VR2 (South Australia)	MB3 (South Australia)	Pts	Dif
1	(South Australia) Heathfield High	Sagero	122 (9)	155 (6)	213 (12)	490	
2	(South Australia) Gleeson College	The Calais	124 (7)	154 (7)	207 (18)	485	-5
3	(South Australia) Gleeson College	Lucky	121 (12)	148 (18)	214 (11)	483	-7
24	(South Australia) Loxton High School	Blur 2	123 (4)	147 (3)	DNS	270	-220
29	(Victoria (state)) Flora Hill SC	Buff Duck	DNS	DNS	220 (5)	220	-270
30	(Victoria (state)) Berwick SC	Firetruck	DNS	DNS	215 (10)	215	-275

Category 3 [G]
Pos	Team	Bike	VR1 (South Australia)	VR2 (South Australia)	MB3 (South Australia)	Pts	Dif
1	(South Australia) Loxton High School	Blur 1	99 (32)	127 (34)	135 (90)	361	
2	(South Australia) Modbury High School	Pink Panther	47 (84)	86 (75)	109 (116)	242	-119
3	(South Australia) Endeavour College	Pink Pharies	DNS	58 (103)	67 (158)	125	-236
4	(South Australia) Renmark High School	Aero 3	DNS	DNS	106 (119)	106	-255

Category 2
Pos	Team	Bike	VR1 (South Australia)	VR2 (South Australia)	MB3 (South Australia)	Pts	Dif
1	(South Australia) Gleeson College	Scorpio	120 (11)	153 (8)	212 (13)	485	
2	(South Australia) Immanuel College	Ice	119 (12)	151 (10)	202 (23)	472	-13
3	(South Australia) Loxton High School	Blur 3	114 (17)	140 (21)	198 (27)	452	-33
4	(South Australia) Hamilton SC	HSV 1	110 (21)	141 (20)	199 (26)	450	-35
29	(Victoria (state)) Flora Hill SC	Sardine Extreme	DNS	DNS	218 (7)	218	-267
30	(Victoria (state)) Weeroona College	Reloaded	DNS	DNS	203 (22)	203	-282

Category 2 [G]
Pos	Team	Bike	VR1 (South Australia)	VR2 (South Australia)	MB3 (South Australia)	Pts	Dif
1	(South Australia) Walford Anglican School	WR1	DNS	106 (5)	192 (33)	298	
2	(South Australia) Scotch College	SCR-1	71 (60)	82 (79)	119 (106)	272	-26
3	(South Australia) Walford Anglican School	WR2	DNS	84 (77)	115 (110)	119	-99
4	(South Australia) Wudinna Area School	Extreme Eyre	DNS	DNS	152 (73)	152	-146
6	(South Australia) Mannum Community College	Mannum 3	34 (97)	50 (111)	32 (193)	116	-182

Category 1
Pos	Team	Bike	VR1 (South Australia)	VR2 (South Australia)	MB3 (South Australia)	Pts	Dif
1	(South Australia) Aberfoyle Hub School	Flying Hubcaps	103 (28)	133 (28)	185 (40)	412	
2	(South Australia) Hahndorf Primary	Hahndorf Trinity	101 (30)	132 (29)	174 (51)	407	-5
3	(South Australia) Immanuel College	Fire	89 (42)	116 (45)	170 (55)	375	-37
4	(South Australia) Magill Primary	Sting	76 (55)	125 (36)	171 (54)	372	-40
5	(South Australia) Seaview Downs	Sea Missile	93 (38)	112 (49)	142 (83)	347	-74
19	(Victoria (state)) Weeroona College	Fill	DNS	DNS	194 (31)	194	-227

Category 1 [G]
Pos	Team	Bike	VR1 (South Australia)	VR2 (South Australia)	MB3 (South Australia)	Pts	Dif
1	(South Australia) Aberfoyle Hub School	Cruising Hubcaps	77 (54)	85 (76)	134 (91)	296	
2	(South Australia) Walford Anglican School	WR3	DNS	68 (95)	108 (117)	176	-120
3	(South Australia) Seymour College	Seymour 3	DNS	66 (95)	DNS	66	-230
4	(South Australia) Paradise Primary	Triple P2	3 (128)	7 (154)	25 (200)	35	-261

=== 2008 Championship ===
Series Champions
Category	Bike	Team	Round 1 Points	Round 2 Points	Round 3 Points	Total Points
4 – Community	BlueShift	(South Australia) TAFE SA	139	172	222	533
3 – Senior School	The Calais	(South Australia) Westminster School, Adelaide	135	162	214	511
3 – Senior School [G]	Pink Panther	(South Australia) Modbury High School	84	114	159	357
2 – Middle School	ICE	(South Australia) Immanuel College (Australia)	126	160	198	484
2 – Middle School [G]	WR1	(South Australia) Walford Anglican School for Girls	0	113	164	277
1 – Primary School	Flying Hubcaps	(South Australia) Aberfoyle Hub Primary School	111	144	183	438
1 – Primary School [G]	Cruising Hubcaps	(South Australia) Aberfoyle Hub Primary School	70	110	105	285

Category 4
Pos	Team	Bike	VR1 (South Australia)	VR2 (South Australia)	MB3 (South Australia)	Pts	Dif
1	(South Australia) TAFE SA	Blueshift	139 (1)	172 (1)	222 (2)	533	
2	(South Australia) CyclingSA	Ballistic	136 (4)	171 (2)	220 (4)	527	-6
3	(Victoria (state)) DUSA	GT-6	138 (2)	168 (5)	217 (7)	523	-10
5	(Victoria (state)) Team Bluebird	Gary	137 (3)	166 (7)	210 (14)	513	-20
14	(Victoria (state)) Bendigo Youth Racing	BY-08	DNS	170 (3)	221 (3)	391	-142
18	(Victoria (state)) Tru Blu Racing	Tru Blu	DNS	DNS	223 (1)	223	-310

Category 3
Pos	Team	Bike	VR1 (South Australia)	VR2 (South Australia)	MB3 (South Australia)	Pts	Dif
1	(South Australia) Westminster School	The Calais	135 (5)	162 (11)	214 (10)	511	
2	(South Australia) Gleeson College	Lucky	131 (9)	163 (10)	215 (9)	509	-2
3	(South Australia) Hub Racing Team	Back In Business	129 (11)	157 (16)	199 (17)	485	-26
15	(Victoria (state)) Flora Hill SC	Old Bearded Mate	DNS	165 (8)	216 (8)	381	-130

Category 3 [G]
Pos	Team	Bike	VR1 (South Australia)	VR2 (South Australia)	MB3 (South Australia)	Pts	Dif
1	(South Australia) Modbury High School	Pink Panther	84 (56)	114 (59)	159 (65)	357	
2	(South Australia) Loxton High School	Blur 1	92 (48)	104 (69)	152 (72)	348	-9
3	(Victoria (state)) Toorak College	Streak	DNS	DNS	91 (133)	91	-266

Category 2
Pos	Team	Bike	VR1 (South Australia)	VR2 (South Australia)	MB3 (South Australia)	Pts	Dif
1	(South Australia) Immanuel College	Ice	126 (14)	160 (13)	198 (26)	484	
2	(South Australia) Wudinna Area School	Granite Growler	120 (20)	146 (27)	195 (29)	461	-23
3	(South Australia) Aberfoyle Hub School	Raging Hubcaps	110 (2)	154 (5)	196 (7)	460	-24
4	(South Australia) Gleeson College	Scorpio	118 (22)	149 (24)	182 (42)	449	-35
5	(South Australia) Heathfield High	Heathfield 2	119 (21)	132 (41)	189 (35)	440	-44
31	(Victoria (state)) FloraHill SC	Brum	DNS	DNS	209 (15)	209	-275
32	(Victoria (state)) Woodleigh School	Helter Skelter	DNS	DNS	205 (19)	205	-279

Category 2 [G]
Pos	Team	Bike	VR1 (South Australia)	VR2 (South Australia)	MB3 (South Australia)	Pts	Dif
1	(South Australia) Walford Anglican School	WR1	DNS	113 (60)	164 (60)	277	
2	(South Australia) Scotch College	SCR-1	78 (62)	82 (91)	82 (142)	242	-35
3	(South Australia) Walford Anglican School	WR2	DNS	53 (120)	126 (98)	179	-98
4	(South Australia) Wudinna Area School	Extreme Eyer	DNS	DNS	138 (86)	138	-89
5	(South Australia) Peterborough High School	Pink Storm	15 (125)	65 (108)	54 (170)	134	-143
6	(South Australia) Good Shepard Lutheran College	GSLC	DNS	DNS	127 (97)	127	-100

Category 1
Pos	Team	Bike	VR1 (South Australia)	VR2 (South Australia)	MB3 (South Australia)	Pts	Dif
1	(South Australia) Aberfoyle Hub School	Flying Hubcaps	111 (29)	144 (29)	183 (41)	438	
2	(South Australia) Immanuel College	Fire	100 (40)	137 (36)	178 (46)	415	-23
3	(South Australia) St Michaels Lutheran	Hahndorf Hornets	91 (49)	125 (48)	170 (54)	386	-52
4	(South Australia) Hahndorf Primary	Red Baron	96 (44)	127 (127)	161 (63)	384	-54

Category 1 [G]
Pos	Team	Bike	VR1 (South Australia)	VR2 (South Australia)	MB3 (South Australia)	Pts	Dif
1	(South Australia) Aberfoyle Hub School	Cruising Hubcaps	70 (70)	110 (60)	105 (119)	285	
2	(South Australia) Mannum CC	River Rapids Won	81 (59)	77 (96)	90 (134)	248	-37
3	(South Australia) Seymour College	Seymour	52 (88)	63 (110)	95 (129)	210	-75

=== 2009 Championship ===
Series Champions
Category	Bike	Team	Round 1 Points	Round 2 Points	Round 3 Points	Total Points
4 – Community	Son of Tiger	(Victoria (state)) Tri-Sled Fresh Racing	149	168	227	544
3 – Senior School	Blizzard	(South Australia) Immanuel College (Australia)	138	161	215	514
3 – Senior School [G]	Blur 1	(South Australia) Loxton High School	119	144	182	445
2 – Middle School	Raging Senior Hubcaps	(South Australia) Aberfoyle Hub School	128	155	203	486
2 – Middle School [G]	SCR-1	(South Australia) Scotch College, Adelaide	97	82	120	299
1 – Primary School	Flying Hubcaps	(South Australia) Aberfoyle Hub Primary School	116	132	168	416
1 – Primary School [G]	WR3	(South Australia) Walford Anglican School for Girls	0	60	117	177
WR3; Walford Anglican School; Category 1 [G]

Category 4
Pos	Team	Bike	VR1 (South Australia)	VR2 (South Australia)	MB3 (South Australia)	Pts	Dif
1	(Victoria (state)) Tri-Sled Fresh Racing	Vehicle 32	149 (1)	168 (2)	227 (2)	544	
2	(South Australia) TAFE SA	Blueshift	147 (3)	167 (3)	225 (4)	539	-5
3	(Victoria (state)) DUSA	S-Chair	145 (5)	166 (4)	224 (5)	535	-9
7	(Victoria (state)) Expats Racing	The Pinnacle	148 (2)	164 (6)	200 (29)	512	-32
13	(Victoria (state)) Tru Blu Racing	Tru Blu	DNS	169 (1)	226 (3)	395	-139
18	(Victoria (state)) Bendigo Youth Racing	BY-09	DNS	DNS	228 (1)	228	-316

Category 3
Pos	Team	Bike	VR1 (South Australia)	VR2 (South Australia)	MB3 (South Australia)	Pts	Dif
1	(South Australia) Immanuel College	Blizzard	138 (12)	161 (9)	215 (14)	514	
2	(South Australia) Loxton High School	Blur 2	136 (14)	153 (17)	208 (21)	497	-17
3	(South Australia) Gleeson College	Hyper	137 (13)	158 (12)	201 (28)	496	-18
4	(South Australia) Concordia College	Matrix	135 (15)	157 (13)	202 (27)	494	-20
17	(South Australia) Unley High School	Unley Seniors	142 (8)	DNS	213 (16)	355	-159
30	(Victoria (state)) Woodleigh School	Helter Skelter	DNS	DNS	218 (11)	218	-296
18	(Victoria (state)) Bendigo SEC	BY-09	DNS	DNS	216 (13)	216	-298

Category 3 [G]
Pos	Team	Bike	VR1 (South Australia)	VR2 (South Australia)	MB3 (South Australia)	Pts	Dif
1	(South Australia) Loxton High School	Blur 1	119 (31)	144 (26)	182 (47)	445	
2	(South Australia) Modbury High School	Pink Panther	89 (61)	124 (46)	142 (87)	355	-90
3	(Victoria (state)) Wudinna Area School	Extreme Eyre	DNS	DNS	164 (65)	164	-281
3	(Victoria (state)) Endeavour College	Pink Pharies	59 (91)	DNS	DNS	59	-386

Category 2
Pos	Team	Bike	VR1 (South Australia)	VR2 (South Australia)	MB3 (South Australia)	Pts	Dif
1	(South Australia) Aberfoyle Hub School	Raging Senior Hubcaps	128 (22)	155 (15)	203 (26)	486	
2	(South Australia) Loxton High School	Blur 3	124 (26)	151 (19)	203 (23)	481	-5
3	(South Australia) Immanuel College	Ice	127 (23)	146 (24)	191 (38)	464	-22
4	(South Australia) Gleeson College	Scorpio	122 (28)	150 (20)	188 (41)	460	-26
6	(South Australia) Mount Barker High	Ichiban	130 (20)	148 (22)	158 (71)	436	-50
34	(Victoria (state)) Weeroona College	Silver Bullet II	DNS	DNS	214 (15)	214	-272
36	(Victoria (state)) Bendigo SEC	Mutt Cutts	DNS	DNS	212 (17)	216	-274

Category 2 [G]
Pos	Team	Bike	VR1 (South Australia)	VR2 (South Australia)	MB3 (South Australia)	Pts	Dif
1	(South Australia) Scotch College	SCR-1	97 (52)	82 (88)	120 (109)	299	
2	(South Australia) Walford Anglican School	WR1	DNS	113 (57)	164 (60)	282	-17
3	(South Australia) Loreto College	Felicity	64 (85)	74 (96)	128 (101)	266	-33
4	(South Australia) Walford Anglican School	WR2	DNS	80 (90)	134 (95)	214	-85

Category 1
Pos	Team	Bike	VR1 (South Australia)	VR2 (South Australia)	MB3 (South Australia)	Pts	Dif
1	(South Australia) Aberfoyle Hub School	Flying Hubcaps	116 (34)	132 (38)	168 (61)	416	
2	(South Australia) Immanuel College	Fire	111 (39)	112 (58)	162 (67)	385	-31
3	(South Australia) Highgate Primary	Highgate Hotrod	87 (63)	130 (40)	166 (63)	383	-33
4	(South Australia) St Michaels Lutheran	Hahndorf Hornets Silver	92 (15)	120 (13)	146 (27)	358	-58
5	(South Australia) Crafers Primary	Crafers Comet	99 (51)	95 (75)	150 (79)	355	-159
17	(Victoria (state)) Weeroona College	Bullet Proof	DNS	DNS	192 (37)	192	-224
21	(South Australia) Brighton Primary	Brighton Bullets	DNS	DNS	175 (54)	175	-241

Category 1 [G]
Pos	Team	Bike	VR1 (South Australia)	VR2 (South Australia)	MB3 (South Australia)	Pts	Dif
1	(South Australia) Walford Anglican School	WR3	DNS	60 (110)	117 (112)	177	
2	(South Australia) Seymour College	Seymour 1	38 (112)	72 (98)	58 (171)	168	-9
3	(South Australia) Seymour College	Seymour 2	62 (87)	32 (138)	DNS	95	-82
4	(South Australia) Walford Anglican School	WR4	DNS	25 (145)	37 (192)	62	-115

=== 2010 Championship ===
Series Champions
Category	Bike	Team	Round 1 Points	Round 2 Points	Round 3 Points	Total Points
4 – Community	Tru Blu	(Victoria (state)) Tru Blu Racing	145	171	214	530
3 – Senior School	Vortex Ultimo	(South Australia) Heathfield High School	136	165	203	504
3 – Senior School [G]	Blur 1	(South Australia) Loxton High School	112	153	184	449
2 – Middle School	Blur 2	(South Australia) Loxton High School	131	161	201	493
2 – Middle School [G]	SCR-1	(South Australia) Scotch College, Adelaide	105	134	164	403
1 – Primary School	Highgate Hot Rod	(South Australia) Highgate Primary School	104	140	169	413
	Flying Hubcaps	(South Australia) Aberfoyle Hub Primary School	101	141	171	413
1 – Primary School [G]	Handorf Hornets Silver	(South Australia) St. Michaels Handorf	54	82	78	214

Category 4
Pos.	No.	Team	Bike	Fairing*	C/HB*	VP1. (South Australia)	VP3. (South Australia)	MB3. (South Australia)	Pts.	Dif.
1	149.	(Victoria (state)) Tru Blu Racing	Tru Blu	John Taylor Bullet	HB	145 (1)	171 (1)	214 (1)	530	
2	1.	(Victoria (state)) Tri-Sled Fresh Racing	Aquila	Trisled Aquila	HB	144 (2)	170 (2)	212 (3)	526	-4
3	27.	(Victoria (state)) DUSA	Team Phantom	John Taylor Bullet	HB	143 (3)	169 (3)	213 (2)	525	-5

Category 3
Pos	Team	Bike	VR1 (South Australia)	VR2 (South Australia)	MB3 (South Australia)	Pts	Dif
1	(South Australia) Heathfield High School	Vortex Ultimo	136 (10)	165 (7)	203 (12)	504	
2	(South Australia) Mount Barker	Powered by Sarcasm	134 (12)	164 (8)	204 (11)	502	-2
3	(South Australia) Gleeson College	Hyper	127 (19)	160 (12)	190 (25)	477	-27
24	(Victoria (state)) Bendigo SSC	Squirrel	DNS	DNS	210 (5)	210	-294
25	(Victoria (state)) Woodleigh School	Helter Skelter	DNS	DNS	208 (7)	208	-296
27	(Victoria (state)) Bendigo SEC	Wail Dooen Warrior	DNS	DNS	207 (8)	207	-297

Category 3 [G]
Pos	Team	Bike	VR1 (South Australia)	VR2 (South Australia)	MB3 (South Australia)	Pts	Dif
1	(South Australia) Loxton High School	Blur 1	112 (34)	153 (19)	184 (31)	449	
2	(South Australia) Modbury High School	Pink Panther	114 (32)	127 (45)	150 (65)	391	-58
3	(South Australia) Mount Carmel College	Black Betty	DNS	DNS	130 (85)	130	-319

Category 2
Pos	Team	Bike	VR1 (South Australia)	VR2 (South Australia)	MB3 (South Australia)	Pts	Dif
1	(South Australia) Loxton High School	Blur 2	131 (15)	161 (11)	201 (14)	493	
2	(South Australia) Immanuel College	Ice	137 (9)	162 (10)	189 (26)	488	-5
3	(South Australia) Wudinna Area School	Extreme Eyre	128 (18)	152 (20)	192 (23)	472	-21
4	(South Australia) Aberfoyle Hub School	Raging Senior Hubcaps	119 (27)	150 (22)	197 (38)	466	-27
5	(South Australia) Gleeson College	Scorpio	129 (17)	151 (21)	177 (38)	457	-36

Category 2 [G]
Pos	Team	Bike	VR1 (South Australia)	VR2 (South Australia)	MB3 (South Australia)	Pts	Dif
1	(South Australia) Scotch College	SCR-1	105 (41)	134 (38)	164 (51)	403	
2	(South Australia) Concordia College	Power Surge	87 (59)	103 (69)	114 (101)	304	-99
3	(South Australia) Loreto College	Felicity	DNS	120 (52)	172 (43)	292	-111
4	(South Australia) Walford Anglican School	WR1	DNS	119 (53)	168 (47)	257	-146
6	(South Australia) St Johns Grammar	Eagle Chicks	57 (89)	70 (102)	67 (148)	194	-209
9	(Western Australia) Living Waters WA	Hyper WA	DNS	DNS	82 (133)	82	-319

Category 1
Pos	Team	Bike	VR1 (South Australia)	VR2 (South Australia)	MB3 (South Australia)	Pts	Dif
1	(South Australia) Highgate Primary	Highgate Hotrod	104 (42)	140 (32)	169 (46)	413	
1	(South Australia) Aberfoyle Hub School	Flying Hubcaps	101 (45)	141 (31)	171 (44)	413	
3	(South Australia) Aberfoyle Park Primary	Computer Screamer	121 (25)	146 (26)	136 (79)	403	-10
4	(South Australia) Immanuel College	Fire	108 (38)	123 (49)	156 (59)	387	-26
5	(South Australia) Westbourne Park	Airborne	106 (40)	118 (54)	152 (63)	376	-37

Category 1 [G]
Pos	Team	Bike	VR1 (South Australia)	VR2 (South Australia)	MB3 (South Australia)	Pts	Dif
1	(South Australia) St Michaels Hahndorf	Hornets Silver	54 (92)	82 (90)	78 (137)	214	
2	(South Australia) Seymour College	Seymour 1	24 (122)	25 (147)	46 (169)	95	-119
3	(South Australia) Walford Anglican School	WR3	DNS	21 (151)	70 (145)	91	-123
5	(South Australia) St Joseph Clare	Flash Racing 2	DNS	71 (101)	DNS	71	-143
5	(South Australia) Seymour College	Seymour 2	25 (121)	38 (134)	DNS	63	-151

=== 2011 Championship ===
Series Champions
Category	Bike	Team	Round 1 Points	Round 2 Points	Round 3 Points	Total Points
4 – Community	Aquila	(Victoria (state)) Tri-Sled Fresh Racing	146	177	213	536
3 – Senior School	Just Razzing	(Victoria (state)) Bendigo Senior Secondary College	145	176	197	518
3 – Senior School [G]	Victorious Secret	(Victoria (state)) EDEC HPV Team	132	162	187	481*
2 – Middle School	Raging Senior Hubcaps	(South Australia) Aberfoyle Hub School	135	169	198	502
2 – Middle School [G]	SCR-1	(South Australia) Scotch College, Adelaide	120	150	166	436*
1 – Primary School	Flying Hubcaps	(South Australia) Aberfoyle Hub Primary School	119	149	172	440*
1 – Primary School [G]	WR4	(South Australia) Walford Anglican School for Girls	57	71	68	196
SCR-1; Scotch College; Category 2 [G]

Category 4
Pos.	No.	Team	Bike	Fairing*	C/HB*	VP1. (South Australia)	VP2. (South Australia)	MB3. (South Australia)	Pts.	Dif.
1	2.	(Victoria (state)) Tri-Sled Fresh Racing	Aquila	Trisled Aquila	HB	146 (1)	177 (2)	213 (3)	536	
2	105.	(South Australia) Team Ballistic	El Cid	Ballistic Outlaw	HB	144 (3)	175 (4)	212 (4)	558	-5
3	99.	(South Australia) Concordia College	COCA Racing	Ballistic Outlaw	C	140 (7)	174 (5)	211 (5)	525	-11
13	69.	(South Australia) TAFE SA	Blueshift	Team Built	HB	142 (5)	178 (1)	25 (191)	345	-191
17	3.	(Victoria (state)) Team Phantom	Re-newbi-ed	John Taylor Bullet	HB	DNS	DNS	215 (1)	215	-321
18	22.	(Victoria (state)) Aurora Racing	Aurora	Team Built	HB	DNS	DNS	214 (2)	214	-322

Category 3
Pos.	No.	Team	Bike	Fairing*	C/HB*	VP1. (South Australia)	VP2. (South Australia)	MB3. (South Australia)	Pts.	Dif.
1	40.	(Victoria (state)) Bendigo SSC	Just Razzing	Team Built	HB	145 (2)	176 (3)	197 (19)	518	
2	212.	(South Australia) Xavier College	Breakaway	Ozone Standard	HB	133 (12)	170 (11)	200 (10)	503	-15
3	13.	(Victoria (state)) EDEC HPV Team	Victorious Secret	Team Built	C	132 (15)	162 (17)	187 (29)	481	-22
4	162.	(South Australia) Loxton High School	Blur 3	Team Built	C	138 (11)	167 (18)	163 (17)	468	-50
23	19.	(South Australia) Pembroke School	Paradox	Team Built	C	DNS	DNS	202 (14)	202	-301
24	38.	(Victoria (state)) Pembroke School	Shorty	Team Built	C	DNS	DNS	199 (17)	199	-304

Category 3 [G]
Pos.	No.	Team	Bike	Fairing*	C/HB*	VP1. (South Australia)	VP2. (South Australia)	MB3. (South Australia)	Pts.	Dif.
1	13.	(Victoria (state)) EDEC HPV Team	Victorious Secret	Team Built	C	132 (15)	162 (17)	187 (29)	481	
2	146.	(South Australia) Loxton High School	Blur 1	Team Built	C	125 (22)	158 (21)	168 (48)	451	-30
3	35.	(Victoria (state)) Modbury High School	Pink Panther	Team Built	C	115 (32)	132 (47)	142 (74)	389	-92

Category 2
Pos.	No.	Team	Bike	Fairing*	C/HB*	VP1. (South Australia)	VP2. (South Australia)	MB3. (South Australia)	Pts.	Dif.
1	148.	(South Australia) Aberfoyle Hub School	Raging Senior Hubcaps	Team Built	C	135 (12)	169 (10)	198 (18)	502	
2	53.	(South Australia) Immanuel College	Ice	Bellotti Evo	C	136 (11)	166 (13)	194 (22)	496	-6
3	86.	(South Australia) Aberfoyle Park Primary	Pinnacle - Evolution	Pinnacle X1	HB	134 (13)	159 (20)	176 (40)	469	-33
3	156.	(South Australia) Loxton High School	Blur 2	Team Built	C	127 (20)	160 (19)	182 (34)	469	-33
33	82.	(Victoria (state)) Woodleigh School	Helter Skelter	Team Built	C	DNS	DNS	201 (15)	201	-301

Category 2 [G]
Pos.	No.	Team	Bike	Fairing*	C/HB*	VP1. (South Australia)	VP2. (South Australia)	MB3. (South Australia)	Pts.	Dif.
1	23.	(South Australia) Scotch College	SCR-1	Trisled FB10	HB	120 (27)	150 (29)	166 (50)	436	
2	183.	(South Australia) Walford Anglican School	WR1	Team Built	HB	113 (34)	145 (34)	155 (61)	413	-23
3	185.	(South Australia) Walford Anglican School	WR2	Team Built	HB	95 (52)	122 (57)	135 (81)	352	-74
5	229.	(South Australia) Wudinna Area School	Venus	Ballistic Outlaw	HB	DNS	DNS	185 (31)	185	-251

Category 1
Pos	Team	Bike	VR1 (South Australia)	VR2 (South Australia)	MB3 (South Australia)	Pts	Dif
1	(South Australia) Aberfoyle Hub School	Flying Hubcaps	119 (28)	149 (30)	172 (44)	440	
2	(South Australia) St Michaels Hahndorf	Hahndorf Hornets Red	105 (42)	147 (32)	180 (36)	432	-8
3	(South Australia) Highgate Primary School	Highgate Hotrod	110 (52)	140 (57)	153 (81)	403	-37
5	(South Australia) Aberfoyle Park Primary	Bridgestone Rocket	111 (36)	144 (35)	132 (84)	387	-53

Category 1 [G]
Pos	Team	Bike	VR1 (South Australia)	VR2 (South Australia)	MB3 (South Australia)	Pts	Dif
1	(South Australia) Walford Anglican School	WR4	57 (90)	71 (108)	68 (148)	196	
2	(South Australia) Seymour College	Seymour Swifts	41 (106)	79 (100)	56 (160)	176	-20
3	(South Australia) St Joseph Clare	Flash Racing	DNS	88 (91)	DNS	469	-88
4	(South Australia) Seymour College	Seymour 2	22 (125)	24 (155)	DNS	46	-130
5	(South Australia) Marymount College	Black Magic	7 (140)	3 (176)	26 (190)	46	-140

=== 2012 Championship ===
Series Champions
Category	Bike	Team	Round 1 Points	Round 2 Points	Round 3 Points	Total Points
4 – Community	Aurora Racing	(Victoria (state)) Aurora Racing	164	184	214	562*
3 – Senior School	Paradox	(South Australia) Pembroke School, Adelaide	155	178	209	542*
3 – Senior School [G]	Victorious Secret	(Victoria (state)) EDEC HPV Team	137	157	168	462
2 – Middle School	Fire Breathing Rubber Duckies	(Victoria (state)) EDEC HPV Team	151	171	197	519*
2 – Middle School [G]	SCR-1 (G)	(South Australia) Scotch College, Adelaide	127	138	149	414
1 – Primary School	Highgate Hot Rod	(South Australia) Highgate Primary School	115	142	161	417
1 – Primary School [G]	WR4 (G)	(South Australia) Walford Anglican School For Girls	96	97	71	264

Category 4
Pos.	No.	Team	Bike	Fairing*	C/HB*	VP1. (South Australia)	VP2. (South Australia)	MB3. (South Australia)	Pts.	Dif.
1	110.	(Victoria (state)) Aurora Racing	Aurora	Team Built	HB	165 (1)	184 (1)	214 (2)	566	
2	49.	(South Australia) Team Ballistic	Outlaw	Ballistic Outlaw	HB	164 (2)	183 (2)	211 (5)	531	-8
3	23.	(Victoria (state)) Strathdale Racing	Strathdale	John Taylor Bullet	HB	163 (3)	182 (3)	207 (9)	552	-14
28	24.	(Victoria (state)) Tru Blu Racing	Tru Blu	John Taylor Bullet	HB	DNS	DNS	215 (1)	215	-351
29	2.	(Victoria (state)) Team Phantom	Beyond New	John Taylor Bullet	HB	DNS	DNS	213 (3)	213	-353

Category 3
Pos.	No.	Team	Bike	Fairing*	C/HB*	VP1. (South Australia)	VP2. (South Australia)	MB3. (South Australia)	Pts.	Dif.
1	25.	(South Australia) Pembroke School	Paradox	Team Built	C	157 (9)	178 (7)	210 (6)	545	
2	178.	(South Australia) Aberfoyle Hub School	Screaming Hubcaps	Ballistic Outlaw	HB	154 (12)	174 (11)	206 (10)	534	-11
3	129.	(South Australia) Xavier College	Green Edge	Ozone Low Liner	HB	148 (18)	173 (12)	204 (12)	525	-20
4	36.	(South Australia) Loxton High School	Blurred Vision	Trisled Aquila	HB	155 (11)	167 (18)	199 (17)	521	-24
28	39.	(Victoria (state)) Bendigo SSC	Gunna Have a Bad Time	Team Built	HB	DNS	DNS	212 (4)	212	-333

Category 3 [G]
Pos.	No.	Team	Bike	Fairing*	C/HB*	VP1. (South Australia)	VP2. (South Australia)	MB3. (South Australia)	Pts.	Dif.
1	10.	(Victoria (state)) EDEC HPV Team	Victorious Secret	Team Built	C	139 (27)	155 (30)	169 (29)	463	
2	64.	(South Australia) Loxton High School	Blur 1	Trisled Aquila	HB	127 (39)	146 (39)	163 (48)	436	-27
3	17.	(South Australia) Modbury High School	Pink Panther	Team Built	C	94 (72)	97 (88)	92 (124)	283	-180

Category 2
Pos.	No.	Team	Bike	Fairing*	C/HB*	VP1. (South Australia)	VP2. (South Australia)	MB3. (South Australia)	Pts.	Dif.
1	9.	(Victoria (state)) EDEC HPV Team	Fire Breathing Rubber Duckies	Team Built	C	153 (13)	170 (15)	198 (18)	521	
2	26.	(South Australia) Immanuel College	Ice	Bellotti Evo	C	150 (39)	171 (39)	192 (48)	513	-8
3	125.	(South Australia) Aberfoyle Hub School	Raging Hubcaps	Ballistic Outlaw	C	149 (17)	163 (22)	193 (23)	505	-16
4	166.	(South Australia) Aberfoyle Park School	Evolution	Pinnacle X1	HB	145 (21)	165 (20)	166 (50)	476	-45

Category 2 [G]
Pos.	No.	Team	Bike	Fairing*	C/HB*	VP1. (South Australia)	VP2. (South Australia)	MB3. (South Australia)	Pts.	Dif.
1	228.	(South Australia) Scotch College	SCR-2	Trisled FB10	HB	129 (37)	137 (48)	150 (66)	416	
2	180.	(South Australia) Walford Anglican School	WR1	Ozone Standard	HB	126 (40)	128 (57)	147 (69)	401	-15
3	76.	(South Australia) Seymour College	Seymour 3	Ozone Standard	HB	65 (101)	70 (115)	137 (79)	272	-144
4	182.	(South Australia) Walford Anglican School	WR2	Ballistic Outlaw	C	73 (93)	75 (110)	110 (106)	258	-158
5	225.	(South Australia) Wudinna Area School	Venus	Ballistic Outlaw	HB	DNS	DNS	182 (34)	182	-234

Category 1
Pos.	No.	Team	Bike	Fairing*	C/HB*	VP1. (South Australia)	VP2. (South Australia)	MB3. (South Australia)	Pts.	Dif.
1	87.	(South Australia) Highgate School	Highgate Hot Rod	Team Built	C	124 (42)	132 (53)	162 (54)	418	
2	172.	(South Australia) Aberfoyle Hub School	Flying Hubcaps	Ballistic Outlaw	C	121 (45)	134 (51)	161 (55)	416	-2
3	161.	(South Australia) Aberfoyle Park Primary	Rocket	Pinnacle X1	HB	118 (48)	140 (45)	139 (77)	397	-21
5	117.	(South Australia) East Para Primary	Chilli Pepper	Trisled FB10	HB	110 (56)	135 (50)	125 (91)	370	-48
6	83.	(South Australia) Craigburn Primary	Crew-sers	Ballistic Outlaw	C	105 (61)	118 (67)	141 (75)	364	-54

Category 1 [G]
Pos.	No.	Team	Bike	Fairing*	C/HB*	VP1. (South Australia)	VP2. (South Australia)	MB3. (South Australia)	Pts.	Dif.
1	186.	(South Australia) Walford Anglican School	WR4	Team Built	C	98 (68)	94 (91)	72 (114)	264	
2	38.	(South Australia) Seymour College	Seymour 1			42 (124)	46 (139)	13 (12)	101	-163
3	188.	(South Australia) Walford Anglican School	WR5			21 (145)	22 (163)	DNS	43	-221
5	52.	(South Australia) St Joseph Clare	Flash Racing 2			DNS	28 (157)	DNS	28	-236
7	217.	(South Australia) Mount Gambier North	Speed Of Sound			DNS	5 (67)	2 (75)	7	-257

=== 2013 Championship ===
Series Champions
Category	Bike	Team	Round 1 Points	Round 2 Points	Round 3 Points	Total Points
4 – Community	Aurora Racing	(Victoria (state)) Aurora Racing	181	187	221	589*
3 – Senior School	Tis But A Scratch	(South Australia) Pembroke School	177	185	217	579*
3 – Senior School [G]	Venus	(Victoria (state)) Wudinna Area School	149	157	183	489
2 – Middle School	Evolution	(South Australia) Aberfoyle Park Primary	164	171	190	525*
2 – Middle School [G]	SCR-1	(South Australia) Scotch College, Adelaide	138	145	172	455
1 – Primary School	The Edge	(South Australia) Crafers Primary School	105	131	158	394
1 – Primary School [G]	HOT M	(Victoria (state)) Murrayville CC	119	127	127	373
Venus; Wudinna Area School; Category 3 [G] SCR-1; Scotch College; Category 2 [G]

Category 4
Pos.	No.	Team	Bike	Fairing*	C/HB*	VP1. (South Australia)	VP2. (South Australia)	MB3. (South Australia)	Pts.	Dif.
1	1	(Victoria (state)) Aurora Racing	Aurora	Team Built	HB	181 (1)	187 (3)	221 (2)	589	
2	200	(Victoria (state)) Platt Racing	Trump Trikes	Trisled Kestrel	HB	179 (3)	189 (1)	220 (3)	588	-1
3	15	(Victoria (state)) Trisled Racing Team	Team 1	Trisled Aquila	HB	180 (2)	186 (4)	219 (4)	586	-3
25	160	(Victoria (state)) Wattle Racing	Whipstick	John Taylor Bullet	HB	176 (6)	188 (2)	31 (192)	395	-194
36	85	(Victoria (state)) Tru Blu Racing	Tru Blu	John Taylor Bullet	HB	DNS	DNS	222 (1)	222	-367

Category 3
Pos.	No.	Team	Bike	Fairing*	C/HB*	VP1. (South Australia)	VP2. (South Australia)	MB3. (South Australia)	Pts.	Dif.
1	bgcolor="#FFFFFF" 2	(South Australia) Pembroke School	Tis But A Scratch	John Taylor Bullet	HB	177 (5)	185 (5)	217 (6)	579	
2	bgcolor="#FFFFFF" 3	(Victoria (state)) EDEC HPV Team	Fire Breathing Rubber Duckies	Team Built	C	168 (14)	180 (10)	209 (14)	557	-22
3	bgcolor="#FFFFFF" 74	(South Australia) Xavier College	GreenEdge	Ozone Low Liner	HB	174 (8)	177 (13)	198 (25)	549	-30
3	bgcolor="#FFFFFF" 45	(Victoria (state)) Bendigo SSC	Assault with a Quiche	Team Built	HB	172 (10)	165 (25)	212 (11)	549	-30

Category 3 [G]
Pos.	No.	Team	Bike	Fairing*	C/HB*	VP1. (South Australia)	VP2. (South Australia)	MB3. (South Australia)	Pts.	Dif.
1	bgcolor="#FFFFFF" 246	(South Australia) Wudinna Area School	Venus	Ballistic Outlaw	HB	149 (33)	157 (33)	183 (40)	489	
2	bgcolor="#FFFFFF" 62	(Victoria (state)) Bendigo SSC	Trevors' Great Escape	Team Built	HB	146 (36)	156 (34)	186 (37)	488	-1
3	bgcolor="#FFFFFF" 213	(South Australia) Loxton High School	She is a Blur	Trisled Aquila	HB	148 (34)	150 (40)	177 (46)	475	-14

Category 2
Pos.	No.	Team	Bike	Fairing*	C/HB*	VP1. (South Australia)	VP2. (South Australia)	MB3. (South Australia)	Pts.	Dif.
1	bgcolor="#FFFF00" 201	(South Australia) Aberfoyle Park Primary	Evolution	Pinnacle X1	HB	164 (18)	171 (19)	190 (33)	525	
2	bgcolor="#FFFF00" 217	(South Australia) Loxton High School	A Little Blurry	Trisled Aquila	HB	155 (27)	167 (23)	188 (35)	510	-15
3	bgcolor="#FFFF00" 9	(South Australia) Pembroke School	Paradox	Team Built	C	153 (29)	162 (28)	197 (26)	512	-13
4	bgcolor="#FFFF00" 137	(South Australia) Aberfoyle Hub School	Raging Hubcaps	Team Built	HB	166 (16)	138 (52)	195 (28)	499	-26
?	bgcolor="#FFFF00" 248	(South Australia) Wudinna Area School	Extreme Eyre	Ballistic Outlaw	HB	DNS	DNS	192 (31)		
?	bgcolor="#FFFF00" 248	(South Australia) Wudinna Area School	Extreme Eyre	Ballistic Outlaw	HB	DNS	DNS	192 (31)		

Category 2 [G]
Pos.	No.	Team	Bike	Fairing*	C/HB*	VP1. (South Australia)	VP2. (South Australia)	MB3. (South Australia)	Pts.	Dif.
1	bgcolor="#FFFF00" 6	(South Australia) Scotch College	SCR-1	Sutton Stelvio	HB	138 (44)	145 (45)	172 (54)	455	
2	bgcolor="#FFFF00" 75	(South Australia) Seymour College	Sey 2	Ozone Standard	HB	121 (61)	146 (44)	166 (59)	433	-22
3	bgcolor="#FFFF00" 18	(South Australia) Walford Anglican School	WR1	Ozone Standard	HB	123 (59)	120 (70)	169 (57)	412	-43

Category 1
Pos.	No.	Team	Bike	Fairing*	C/HB*	VP1. (South Australia)	VP2. (South Australia)	MB3. (South Australia)	Pts.	Dif.
1	bgcolor="#FFA500" 121	(South Australia) Crafers Primary School	The Edge	Trisled Kestrel	HB	105 (77)	131 (59)	158 (65)	394	
2	bgcolor="#FFA500" 84	(Victoria (state)) Murrayville CC	HOT M	Team Built	HB	119 (63)	127 (63)	127 (96)	373	-21
3	bgcolor="#FFA500" 4	(South Australia) Highgate School	Highgate Hotrod	Team Built	C	117 (65)	125 (65)	124 (99)	366	-28
3	bgcolor="#FFA500" 134	(South Australia) East Para Primary	Chain Gang	Trisled Kestrel	HB	114 (68)	117 (74)	135 (88)	366	-28
5	bgcolor="#FFA500" 90	(South Australia) Aberfoyle Hub School	Flying Hubcaps	Team Built	HB	116 (66)	93 (97)	147 (76)	356	-38

Category 1 [G]
Pos.	No.	Team	Bike	Fairing*	C/HB*	VP1. (South Australia)	VP2. (South Australia)	MB3. (South Australia)	Pts.	Dif.
1	bgcolor="#FFA500" 84	(Victoria (state)) Murrayville CC	HOT M	Team Built	HB	119 (63)	127 (63)	127 (96)	373	
2	bgcolor="#FFA500" 46	(South Australia) Seymour College	Sey 1	Ozone Low Liner	HB	43 (139)	90 (100)	87 (136)	220	-153
3	bgcolor="#FFA500" 7	(South Australia) Walford Anglican School	WR3	Team Built	C	59 (123)	62 (128)	67 (156)	188	-185
4	bgcolor="#FFA500" 20	(South Australia) Walford Anglican School	WR4	Team Built	C	52 (130)	36 (154)	DNS	88	-285

=== 2014 Championship ===
Category 4
Pos.	No.	Team	Bike	Fairing*	C/HB	L1. (South Australia)	VP2. (South Australia)	VP3. (South Australia)	MB4. (South Australia)	Pts.	Dif.
1	127.	Platt Racing	Trump Trikes	Trump 2014	HB	DNS	250 (1st); 202 laps	250 (1st); 215 laps	250 (1st); 533 laps	750	
2	38.	Trisled Racing Team	Team 1	Trisled Aquila	HB	250 (1st); 153 laps	249 (2nd); 199 laps	248 (3rd); 206 laps	248 (3rd); 498 laps	746	-4
3	24.	Norwood Morialta High School	Trump Trikes	Trump 2014	HB	249 (2nd); 150 laps	248 (3rd); 191 laps	249 (2nd); 207 laps	246 (5th); 492 laps	744	-6
4	170.	Dirty Mongrel Racing	Unhinged	John Taylor Bullet	HB	247 (4th); 137 laps	242 (9th); 174 laps	244 (7th); 190 laps	243 (8th); 460 laps	734	-16
35	52.	Tru Blu Racing	Tru Blu	John Taylor	HB	DNS	DNS	DNS	249 (2nd); 530 laps	249	-501

Category 3
Pos.	No.	Team	Bike	Fairing*	C/HB	L1. (South Australia)	VP2. (South Australia)	VP3. (South Australia)	MB3. (South Australia)	Pts.	Dif.
1	43.	EDEC HPV Team	Fire Breathing Rubber Duckies	Team Built	C	248 (3rd); 149 laps	245 (6th); 182 laps	242 (9th); 186 laps	242 (9th); 455 laps	735	
2	2.	Pembroke School	Brian	Own Construction	C	245 (6th); 132 laps	238 (13th); 168 laps	236 (15th); 169 laps	241 (10th); 451 laps	724	-10
3	176.	Xavier College	Green Edge	Ozone Lowliner	HB	239 (12th); 125 laps	240 (11th); 171 laps	238 (13th); 176 laps	230 (21st); 414 laps	709	-26

Category 3 [G]
Pos.	No.	Team	Bike	Fairing*	C/HB	L1. (South Australia)	VP2. (South Australia)	VP3. (South Australia)	MB3. (South Australia)	Pts.	Dif.
1	10.	Pembroke School	The Devil Wears Cleats	Own Construction	C	DNS	177 (74th); 118 laps	176 (75th); 127 laps	✔	353	
2	41.	Loxton High School	She's a Blur	Trisled Aquila	HB	222 (29th); 97 laps	189 (62nd); 124 laps	DNS	✔	411	
3	139.	Nurioopta High School	Harlequin	Trisled Kestrel	HB	206 (45th); 81 laps	93(158th); 85 laps	138 (113th); 106 laps	✔	344	-67
4	256.	Renmark High School	Aero 2	Trisled Kestrel	HB	218 (32nd); 92 laps	DNS	DNS	✔	218	-193

Category 2
Pos.	No.	Team	Bike	Fairing*	C/HB	L1. (South Australia)	VP2. (South Australia)	VP3. (South Australia)	MB3. (South Australia)	Pts.	Dif.
1	11.	Pembroke School	Eric Half The Bee	Own Construction	C	55 (10th); 126 laps	168 (16th); 160 laps	168 (14th); 170 laps	✔	391	
2	167.	Aberfoyle Hub School	Raging Hubcaps	Own Construction	HB	50 (15th); 115 laps	167 (17th); 157 laps	157 (25th); 154 laps	✔	374	-17
3	17.	Scotch College	SCR-2	Sutton Stelvio	HB	DNS	156 (28th); 144 laps	165 (17th); 165 laps	165 (23rd); 407 laps	321	-70
4	40.	Loxton High School	A Little Blurry	Trisled Aquila	HB	47 (18th); 112 laps	163 (21st); 151 laps	DNS	✔	210	-181

Category 2 [G]
Pos.	No.	Team	Bike	Fairing*	C/HB	L1. (South Australia)	VP2. (South Australia)	VP3. (South Australia)	MB3. (South Australia)	Pts.	Dif.
1	6.	Scotch College	SCR-1	Sutton Stelvio	HB	DNS	210 (41st); 135 laps	218 (33rd); 149 laps	✔	428	
2	31.	Modbury High School	Pink Panther	Fast Cats FB14	HB	207 (44th); 81 laps	174 (77th); 116 laps	173 (78th); 125 laps	139 (112th); 303 laps	520	-?
3	104.	Walford Anglican	WR2	Trisled Kestrel	HB	DNS	106 (78th); 116 laps	118 (64th); 132 laps	✔	224	-68
4	87.	Seymour College	Blackwatch Racing	Ozone Standard	HB	25 (39th); 88 laps	49 (135th); 92 laps	136 (46th); 143 laps	✔	210	-82
5	86.	Walford Anglican	WR1	Trisled Kestrel	HB	DNS	152 (32nd); 142 laps	50 (132nd); 99 laps	✔	202	-90
6	246.	Marymount College	Penelope	Greenspeed	HB	12 (52nd); 73 laps	43 (141st); 90 laps	8 (174th); 82 laps	✔	63	-229

Category 1
Pos.	No.	Team	Bike	Fairing*	C/HB	L1. (South Australia)	VP2. (South Australia)	VP3. (South Australia)	MB3. (South Australia)	Pts.	Dif.
1	202.	Highgate School	Highgate Hotrod	Own Construction	C	41 (24th); 104 laps	141 (43rd); 135 laps	124 (58th); 136 laps	✔	306	
2	98.	Crafers Primary School	The Edge	Trisled Kestrel	HB	DNS	132 (52nd); 130 laps	145 (37th); 147 laps	✔	277	-29
3	7.	Murrayville Community College	Hot M	John Taylor Bullet	HB	35 (30th); 94 laps	131 (53rd); 130 laps	103 (79th); 125 laps	✔	269	-37
4	150.	East Para Primary School	Chain Gang	Trisled Kestel	HB	29 (36th); 91 laps	103 (81st); 114 laps	126 (56th); 136 laps	✔	258	-48
5	79.	Aberfoyle Hub School	Flying Hubcaps	Own Construction	HB	27 (38th); 89 laps	124 (60th); 125 laps	105 (77th); 125 laps	✔	256	-50

Category 1 [G]
Pos.	No.	Team	Bike	Fairing*	C/HB	L1. (South Australia)	VP2. (South Australia)	VP3. (South Australia)	MB3. (South Australia)	Pts.	Dif.
1	103.	Seymour College	Blackwatch Racing Jnr	Ozone Standard	HB	DNS	67(117th); 97 laps	117 (65th); 132 laps		184	
2	149.	Walford Anglican	WR3	Ballistic	C	DNS	89 (94th); 107 laps	94 (88th); 119 laps		183	-1
3	151.	Craigburn Primary School	Crew-sers 2		C	17 (48th); 78 laps	80 (104th); 104 laps	64 (118th); 102 laps		161	-23
	117.	Hahndorf Lutheran	Hornets Silver			DNS	65 (119th); 96 laps	67 (115th); 104 laps		132	-128
	245.	Marymount College	Amelia		HB	8 (57th); 68 laps	43 (141st); 90 laps	5 (177th); 78 laps		56	-128

=== 2015 Championship ===
Category 4
Pos.	No.	Team	Bike	Fairing*	C/HB	L1. (South Australia)	VP2. (South Australia)	VP3. (South Australia)	MB4. (South Australia)	Pts.	Dif.
1	23	(Victoria (state)) Trisled	Team 1	Trisled Aquila	HB	250 (1st); 159 laps	250 (1st); 209 laps	247 (4th); 202 laps	249 (2nd)	749	
2	17	(Victoria (state)) Aurora Racing	Aurora	HPR 2015	HB	DNS	248 (3rd); 203 laps	249 (2nd); 208 laps	250 (1st)	747	-2
3	108	(Victoria (state)) Wattle Racing	Toothless	John Taylor Bullet	HB	249 (2nd); 156 laps	249 (2nd); 209 laps	248 (3rd); 207 laps	248 (3rd)	746	-3
4	17	(South Australia) Relentless Racing	Trump Trikes	Trump 2015	HB	248 (3rd); 153 laps	069 (183th); 9 laps	250 (1st); 211 laps	247 (4th)	745	-4
5	28	(South Australia) Norwood Morialta High	Focus	Trump 2015	HB	245 (6th); 144 laps	247 (4th); 198 laps	246 (5th); 197 laps	246 (5th)	739	-10
6	62	(South Australia) Dirty Mongrel Racing	Unhinged	John Taylor Bullet	HB	243 (8th); 143 laps	246 (5th); 198 laps	245 (6th); 189 laps	245 (6th)	736	-13

Category 3
Pos.	No.	Team	Bike	Fairing*	C/HB	L1. (South Australia)	VP2. (South Australia)	VP3. (South Australia)	MB4. (South Australia)	Pts.	Dif.
1	8	(South Australia) Pembroke School	Brian	Trump Taipan	HB	240 (11th); 135 laps	242 (9th); 188 laps	238 (13th); 181 laps		482	
2	50	(South Australia) Nuriootpa High School	Avenger	John Taylor Bullet	HB	232 (19th); 124 laps	236 (15th); 179 laps	230 (21st); 169 laps		468	-14
3	13	(South Australia) Loxton High School	Blurred Vision	Trisled Aquila	HB	234 (17th); 125 laps	230 (21st); 168 laps	DNS		464	-18
4	157	(South Australia) Freemont Elizabeth City High School	FECHS Racing - RAAH I	Trump Taipan	HB	DNS	229 (22nd); 168 laps	231 (20th); 169 laps		460	-22

Category 3 [G]
Pos.	No.	Team	Bike	Fairing*	C/HB	L1. (South Australia)	VP2. (South Australia)	VP3. (South Australia)	MB4. (South Australia)	Pts.	Dif.
1	9	(South Australia) Pembroke School	The Devil Wears Cleats	Team built	C	223 (28th); 110 laps	222 (29th); 158 laps	195 (56th); 139 laps		445	
2	5	(South Australia) Loxton High School	Shes a Blur	Trisled Aquila	HB	212 (39th); 98 laps	196 (55th); 142 laps	DNS		408	-37
3	32	(South Australia) Modbury High School	Pink Panther	Team built	HB	197 (54th); 80 laps	160 (91st); 120 laps	125 (126th); 104 laps		357	-88
4	127	(South Australia) Nuriootpa High School	Harlequin	Trisled Kestrel	HB	201 (50th); 83 laps	153 (98th); 115 laps	117 (134th); 100 laps		354	-91
5	90	(South Australia) Seymour College	Blackwatch Racing	Trisled Kestrel?	HB	199 (52nd); 82 laps	122 (129th); 101 laps	131 (120th); 106 laps		330	-115
6	26	(South Australia) Norwood Morialta High School	XP8	Ozone?	HB	DNS	DNS	142 (109th); 108 laps		142	-303

Category 2
Pos.	No.	Team	Bike	Fairing*	C/HB	L1. (South Australia)	VP2. (South Australia)	VP3. (South Australia)	MB4. (South Australia)	Pts.	Dif.
1	3	(South Australia) Pembroke School	Eric the Half Bee	Trump Taipan	HB	242 (9th); 142 laps	245 (6th); 191 laps	233 (18th); 177 laps		487	
2	109	(South Australia) Nuriootpa High School	Bullet	Trump Taipan	HB	220 (31st); 105 laps	228 (23rd); 163 laps	216 (35th); 151 laps		448	-39
3	12	(South Australia) Loxton High School	A Little Blurry	Trisled Aquila	HB	226 (25th); 112 laps	221 (30th); 156 laps	DNS		447	-40
3	146	(South Australia) Urrbrae Ag High School	Urrbrae 1			DNS	225 (26th); 160 laps	222 (29th); 155 laps		447	-40
7	33	(South Australia) Modbury High School	Lynx	Team Built?	HB	181 (70th); 70 laps	187 (64th); 137 laps	218 (33rd); 153 laps		405	-82

Category 2 [G]
Pos.	No.	Team	Bike	Fairing*	C/HB	L1. (South Australia)	VP2. (South Australia)	VP3. (South Australia)	MB4. (South Australia)	Pts.	Dif.
1	6	Scotch College	SCR-1	Sutton Stelvio	HB	DNS	2nd	1st	1st	590	
2		Walford	WR1	Sutton Stelvio	HB	DNS	1st	2nd	2nd	574	-16
3		Seymour	Blackwatch Racing	Ozone	HB	1st	3rd	3rd	3rd	527	-63

Category 1
Pos.	No.	Team	Bike	Fairing*	C/HB	L1. (South Australia)	VP2. (South Australia)	VP3. (South Australia)	MB4. (South Australia)	Pts.	Dif.
1											
2											
3											

Category 1 [G]
Pos.	No.	Team	Bike	Fairing*	C/HB	L1. (South Australia)	VP2. (South Australia)	VP3. (South Australia)	MB4. (South Australia)	Pts.	Dif.
1											
2											
3											

=== 2016 Championship ===
Category 4
Pos.	No.	Team	Bike	Fairing*	C/HB	L1. (South Australia)	VP2. (South Australia)	VP3. (South Australia)	MB4. (South Australia)	Pts.	Dif.
1	99	Aurora Racing	Aurora Racing	HP 2016	HB	DNS	149 (2nd); 229 laps	150 (1st); 234 laps	150 (1st); 634 laps	449	
2	104	Wattle Racing	Toothles	John Taylor Bullet	HB	149 (2nd); 160 laps	150 (1st); 229 laps	149 (2nd); 233 laps	149 (2nd); 613 laps	448	1
3	81	Relelntless Racing	Full Tilt	Trump Elite	HB	DNS	143 (8th); 202 laps	147 (4th); 210 laps	148 (3rd); 606 laps	438	11

Category 3
Pos.	No.	Team	Bike	Fairing*	C/HB	L1. (South Australia)	VP2. (South Australia)	VP3. (South Australia)	MB4. (South Australia)	Pts.	Dif.
1	2	Pembroke School	Eric	Trump Elite	HB	150 (1st); 147 laps	150 (1st); 195 laps	150 (1st); 194 laps	149 (2nd); 530 laps	499	
2	22	Trisled	Trisled Development Team	Trisled Aquilla	HB	149 (2nd); 137 laps	0 (3rd)*; 181 laps*	149 (2nd); 188 laps	150 (1st); 560 laps	498	1
3	51	Concordia College	Harmony	Trump Elite	HB	DNS	149 (4th); 174 laps	148 (3rd); 176 laps	148 (3rd); 508 laps	495	4

Category 3 [G]
Pos.	No.	Team	Bike	Fairing*	C/HB	L1. (South Australia)	VP2. (South Australia)	VP3. (South Australia)	MB4. (South Australia)	Pts.	Dif.
1	6	Pembroke School	The Devil Wears Cleats	Trump Elite	HB	147 (4th); 119 laps	142 (9th); 160 laps	146 (5th); 160 laps	144 (7th); 469 laps	437	
2	127	Loxton High School	She's a Blur	Trisled Aquilla	HB	143 (8th); 104 laps	136 (15th); 144 laps	DNS	135 (16th); 423 laps	414	23
3	30	Modbury High School	Pink Panther		HB	143 (16th); 85 laps	140 (19th); 133 laps	134 (25th); 129 laps	115 (34th); 85 laps	398	39

Category 2
Pos.	No.	Team	Bike	Fairing*	C/HB	L1. (South Australia)	VP2. (South Australia)	VP3. (South Australia)	MB4. (South Australia)	Pts.	Dif.
1	3	Pembroke School	Boris	Trump Elite	HB	150 (1st); 127 laps	150 (1st); 181 laps	150 (1st); 178 laps	150 (1st); 515 laps	450	
2	265	Loxton High School	A Little Blurry	Trisled Aquilla	HB	149 (2nd); 123 laps	148 (3rd); 162 laps	DNS	149 (2nd); 482 laps	446	4
3	123	Mount Barker High	Barking Mad		C	147 (4th); 111 laps	149 (2nd); 167 laps	148 (3rd); 167 laps	145 (6th); 443 laps	442	8

Category 2 [G]
Pos.	No.	Team	Bike	Fairing*	C/HB	L1. (South Australia)	VP2. (South Australia)	VP3. (South Australia)	MB4. (South Australia)	Pts.	Dif.
1	7	Scotch College	SCR-1	Sutton Stelvio	HB	DNS	136 (15th)	143 (8th)	135 (16th)	414	
2	303	Walford Anglican School for Girls	WR2	Sutton Stelvio	HB	DNS	139 (12th)	137 (14th)	133 (18th)	409	5
2	12	Seymour College	Blackwatch 2		HB	144 (7th)	137 (16th)	123 (28th)	128 (23rd)	409	-5

Category 1
Pos.	No.	Team	Bike	Fairing*	C/HB	L1. (South Australia)	VP2. (South Australia)	VP3. (South Australia)	MB4. (South Australia)	Pts.	Dif.
1	4	East Para Primary	Crank Crew	Trisled Aquilla	HB	150 (1st); 103 laps	147 (4th); 129 laps	150 (1st); 152 laps	150 (1st); 439 laps	450	
2	198	Crafers Primary	Snappin Pappin	Trisled Kestrel	HB	147 (4th); 100 laps	150 (1st); 140 laps	149 (2nd); 143 laps	149 (2nd); 407 laps	448	2
3	282	Highgate School	Highgate Hot Rod		C	148 (3rd); 100 laps	149 (2nd); 139 laps	148 (3rd); 140 laps	148 (3rd); 392 laps	445	5

Category 1 [G]
Pos.	No.	Team	Bike	Fairing*	C/HB	L1. (South Australia)	VP2. (South Australia)	VP3. (South Australia)	MB4. (South Australia)	Pts.	Dif.
1											
2											
3											

Note: At the conclusion of the Cat 1-3 race at Victoria Park (Round 2), protests were lodged against 2 category 3 teams (Team 22 Trisled Development Team and Team 316 GTrikes Matrix) with the complaint being that both Trisled and GTrikes fielded riders who had finished school. Due to the rulebook being unclear for the eligibility of category 3 riders, the rule could be interpreted both ways which subsequently led to the disqualification of both Trisled and GTrikes. The official ruling pointed this out - "Neither Team 22 (Trisled) nor 316 (GTrikes) has sought to gain an unfair advantage. They have appraised AIPP of their intentions throughout and have been open and honest with AIPP. The interpretation of the rule by AIPP as it is currently written was incorrect. AIPP unreservedly apologises to both teams for the error in interpretation."

=== 2017 Championship ===
Category 4
Pos.	No.	Team	Bike	Mount Gambier, MG1. (South Australia)	L2. (South Australia)	VP3. (South Australia)	VP4. (South Australia)	MB5. (South Australia)	Pts.	Dif.
Category 4 Community
1	27	Wattle Racing	Toothless	1st	DNS	1st	1st		300	-
2	76	Team Relentless	Trump Trikes	2nd	1st	2nd	2nd		299	-1
3	190	Unhinged	Unhinged	3rd	2nd	4th	8th		297	-3
Category 4 Community [All-Female]
1	5	Wattle Racing	She's the Man	1st	DNS	1st	1st		276	-
2	20	Fast Cats Racing	Cheshire Cat	2nd	1st	2nd	2nd		255	-21
3		N/A								
Category 4 Community [Masters]
1	31	WAHPVA	Donald	DNS	2nd	1st	1st		290	-
2	117	Roof Rack City Racing	Elanor	DNS	1st	2nd	2nd		285	-5
3		EDEC HPV Team	Pacemakers	1st	3rd	DNS	DNS		279	-11

Category 3
Pos.	No.	School / Team	Bike	MG1. (South Australia)	L2. (South Australia)	VP3. (South Australia)	VP4. (South Australia)	MB5. (South Australia)	Pts.	Dif.
Category 3 School
1	2	Pembroke School	Eric	1st	DNS	1st	1st		300	-
2	165	Mt Barker High	Barking Mad	DNS	1st	3rd	4th		298	-2
3	255	St Peter's College	Vector	DNS	DNS	147	146		441	-3
Category 3 School [All-Female]
1	25	Modbury High School	Pink Panther	1st	2nd	2nd	2nd		280	-
2	189	Loxton High School	She's a Blur	DNS	1st	1st	DNS		276	-4
3	224	Seymour College	Blackwatch Racing 3	DNS	3rd	4th	3rd		250	-30
Category 3 Community
1	39	Trisled	Peninsula Human Power	DNS	DNS	1st	1st		300	-
2	162	G-Trikes	Road Rage Matrix	DNS	DNS	2nd	2nd		298	-2
3	56	G-Trikes	Road Rage Trixi	3rd	1st	4th	3rd		298	-2

Category 2
Pos.	No.	School / Team	Bike	Mount Gambier, MG1. (South Australia)	L2. (South Australia)	VP3. (South Australia)	VP4. (South Australia)	MB5. (South Australia)	Pts.	Dif.
Category 2 School
1	3	Pembroke School	Radar	1st	DNS	1st	1st		300	-
2	161	Norwood Morialta High School	Focus	DNS	DNS	2nd	2nd		298	-2
3	206	Unity College	Bunyip	DNS	1st	3rd	3rd		298	-2
Category 2 School [All-Female]
1	7	Scotch College	SCR-1	DNS	1st	2nd	1st		285	-
2	14	Walford Anglican School for Girls	WR1	DNS	DNS	1st	2nd		278	-7
3	223	Seymour College	Blackwatch Racing 2	DNS	2nd	4th	3rd		274	-11
Category 2 Community
1	72	Roof Rack City Racing	Francis Birtles	DNS	1st	1st	1st		300	-
2	61	Roof Rack City Racing	Black Rhino	1st	2nd	3rd	2nd		299	-1
3	40	Hills HPV Racing								
DNS	DNS	2nd	4th		296	-4				

Category 1
Pos.	No.	School / Team	Bike	Mount Gambier, MG1. (South Australia)	L2. (South Australia)	VP3. (South Australia)	VP4. (South Australia)	MB5. (South Australia)	Pts.	Dif.
Category 1 School
1	54	Coromandel Primary School	Black Betty	DNS	5th	1st	1st		300	-
2	64	Holy Trinity Lutheran School	Thunder	2nd	1st	DNS	DNS		299	-1
3	11	East Para Primary School	Crank Crew	DNS	3rd	2nd	2nd		298	-2
Category 1 School [All-Female]
1	8	Walford Anglican School for Girls	WR4	DNS	DNS	1st	1st		285	-
2	222	Seymour College	Blackwatch Racing 1	DNS	2nd	3rd	2nd		264	-11
3	298	Marymount College	Pending	DNS	DNS	2nd	3rd		264	-11
Category 1 Community
1		N/A								
2		N/A								
3		N/A								

== Championship records ==
Championship wins (since 2006)
Category	Team	Championships	Total
4	(Victoria (state)) Trisled	2009, 2011, 2015	3
4	(Victoria (state)) Aurora	2012, 2013, 2016, 2021, 2022	5
4	(South Australia) Ballistic	2006, 2007	2
3	(South Australia) Heathfield High School	2006, 2007, 2010	3
3 [G]	(South Australia) Loxton High School	2006, 2007, 2009, 2010, 2014, 2017	6
2	(South Australia) Pembroke	2013, 2014, 2015, 2016, 2017, 2021, 2022, 2023	8
2	(South Australia) Gleeson College	2006, 2007	2
2	(South Australia) Aberfoyle Hub School	2009, 2011	2
2 [G]	(South Australia) Scotch College	2009, 2010, 2011, 2012, 2013, 2014, 2015, 2016, 2017	9
1	(South Australia) Aberfoyle Hub School	2006, 2007, 2008, 2009, 2010, 2011	6
1 [G]	(South Australia) Walford Anglican School	2009, 2011, 2012, 2016, 2017	5
1 [G]	(South Australia) Aberfoyle Hub School	2006, 2007, 2008	3

== Other Australian HPV races ==
- Queensland - RACQ Technology Challenge
- Tasmania - RACT Insurance Challenge
- (Victoria (state)) Victoria - Victorian HPV Series
- (Victoria (state)) Victoria - Maroondah Grand Prix
- (Victoria (state)) Victoria - RACV Energy Breakthrough
- Western Australia - WA Pedal Prix Series
