= Flora Hill =

- Suburb
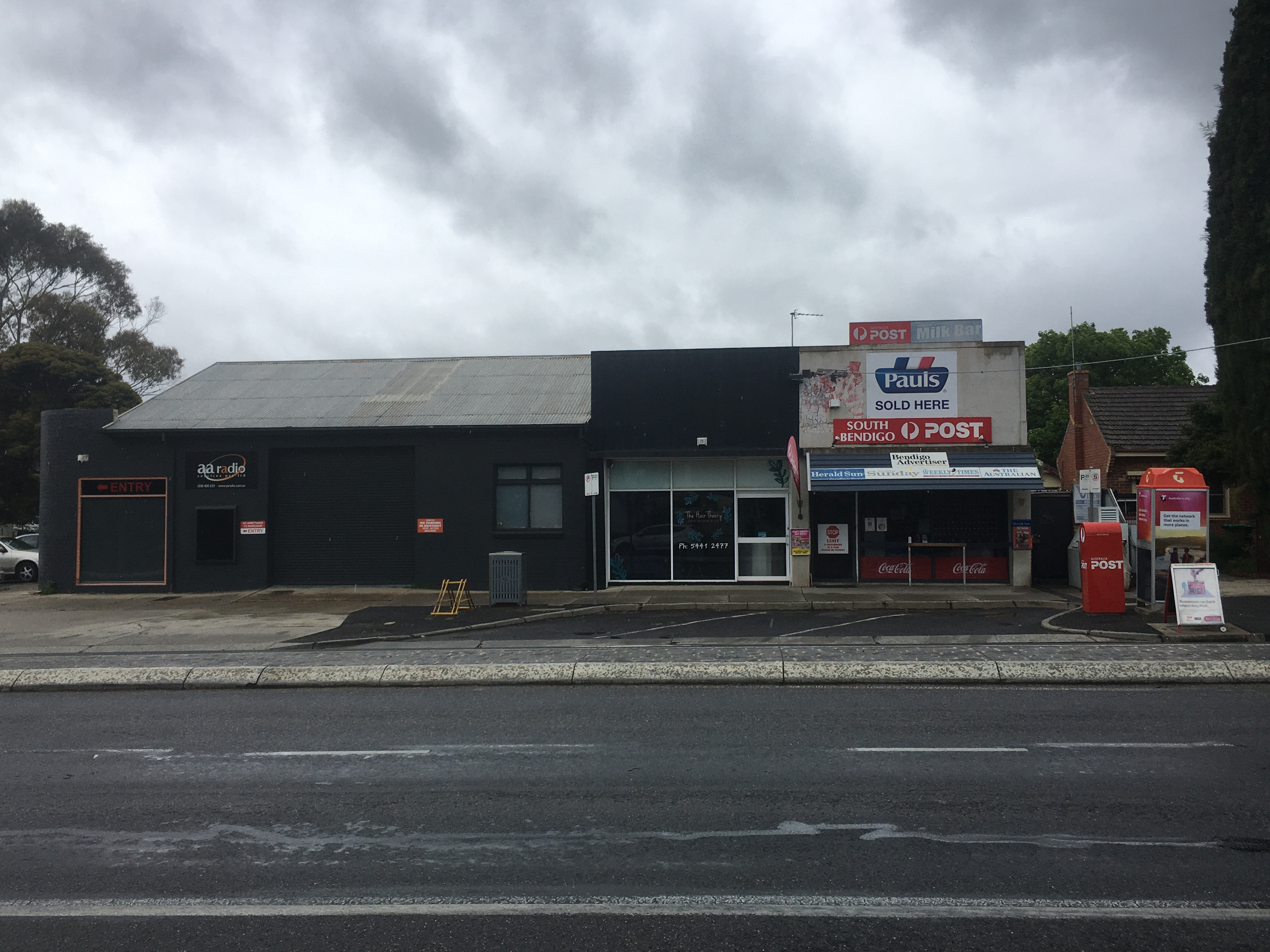
- Flora Hill Shops in November 2021

- Interactive map of Flora Hill
- Coordinates: 36°46′39″S 144°17′39″E
- Country: Australia
- State: Victoria
- City: Bendigo
- LGA: City of Greater Bendigo

Government
  - State electorate: Bendigo East
  - Federal division: Bendigo

Population
  - Total: 3,989 (2021 census)
- Postcode: 3550

Flora Hill is a suburb of Bendigo, Victoria, Australia, located 3 km south-east of the Central Business District. The suburb is the location of the Bendigo South East College and the La Trobe University Bendigo Campus.
