= Flora Hill Secondary College =

Location
- Flora Hill, Bendigo, Victoria; Australia; 36°46′34″S 144°17′47″E

Information
- Status: Closed
- Closed: 2008
- Colours: Blue and yellow

Flora Hill Secondary College was a public co-educational secondary school, catering for students in Year 7 to Year 10, located in Flora Hill, Bendigo, Victoria, Australia.

== Overview ==
In 2009, the college had an enrolment of over 1200 students, supported by over 100 staff. Year 10 students had the opportunity to specialise in specific areas of interest. Senior students also had the opportunity to undertake some units of their Victorian Certificate of Education (VCE) at the college. Most of the students who elected to go on to achieve the VCE do so at Bendigo Senior Secondary College. Before becoming co-educational, Bendigo South East was known as Flora Hill Secondary College, and before that both Flora Hill High School and The Bendigo's School for Domestic Arts, a Girls High School.

Flora Hill Secondary College, in honour of it history, named their sporting houses after influential females in history. Gold was (Caroline) Chisholm, Red was Bronte after the three Brontë sisters, Blue was (Daisy) Bates and Green was (Florence) Nightingale.

Flora Hill Secondary College amalgamated with Golden Square Secondary College in 2008. Bendigo South East College was the amalgamated school built on the old Flora Hill Secondary College site.

== See also ==
- List of schools in Victoria, Australia
- Bendigo South East College
