= McNamara Park =

Coordinates: 37°49′55″S 140°39′3″E

McNamara Park, commonly known as Mac Park, is a motorcycle only racing circuit, located near Mount Gambier in South Australia. The 2.4 km track has 12 corners and runs clockwise. Owned and run by the Mount Gambier Motorcycle and Light Car Club Inc., the circuit is used for motorcycle, human powered vehicle (HPV), and kart racing only. Auto racing events are not held there, due to higher insurance and maintenance costs. There is also a shorter, 1.8 km version of the circuit.

The biggest meeting of the year is known as the Master of Mac Park.

In 2014, a non-championship round of the Australian HPV Super Series was held on the track. This was upgraded to a championship round for 2017.
