= Modbury High School =

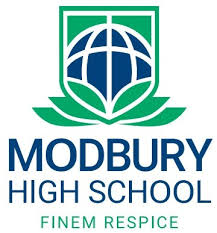

Location
- Modbury, South Australia, South Australia; Australia; 34.8374°S 138.6983°E

Information
- Type: Public school
- Motto: Latin: Finem Respice
- Established: 1965; 61 years ago
- Principal: Joanne Costa
- Enrolment: 720 (yr 7 – yr 12)
- Colours: Light blue, navy blue, white & green
- Slogan: A culture of achievement in a respectful and rigorous learning environment
- Affiliation: Sports Association for Adelaide Schools
- Website: www.modburyhs.sa.edu.au

Modbury High School is a government school in the north-eastern suburbs of Adelaide. It borders Modbury South Primary School and is in close proximity to Ardtornish Primary School. School enrolment currently has over 700 students for year levels seven to twelve.^{[A]}

== History ==
The school was opened in 1965 to cater for the large population increase in the area. The school initially opened with 97 students (all of whom in Year 8) and 7 teachers with the first graduating class in 1970. During the population boom of 1970s Australia, the school's enrolment figure reached 1383 students.

In 1978, a new multi-story structure was built housing the current library and flexible units. Two years later the school's music suite was built, housing four practice rooms, one classroom, and a soundproofed rehearsal room.

In the beginning of the 1980s, the school had a collective fundraiser to raise money to construct a gymnasium. It was completed during the 1983 school year and is now a prominent landmark at the school's entrance. The gymnasium is used for school sports, major school assemblies, and was shared with Modbury South Primary School until the completion of its own gymnasium. By 1993 a Physical Education Laboratory was constructed within the gymnasium, giving students facilities for weight training, as well as housing classrooms.

A cafeteria/auditorium was completed in 1995, opened by then principal Robert Hill. It is popularly used as a meal area during recess and lunchtime but is also used for assemblies, meetings and concerts.

Subsequent fundraising efforts of late have seen numerous other structures erected to aid the aesthetic and practical values of the school, notably the expansive front shelter constructed in recent years and another backing the auditorium preceding it.

A visual arts centre opened at the end of 2009. It houses four classrooms, a computing room, main display area, and other facilities.

During 2015-2016, two consecutive perfect ATAR of 99.95 were achieved, making the school the only public school in Australia to achieve the perfect ATAR.

In 2018, a 14-year old from year 9 was sent to Royal Adelaide Hospital with serious head injuries after being in a schoolyard fight against other students.

Construction started in late 2020 for a new set of buildings to accommodate for the inclusion of year 7s to high school. The construction was completed during the 2021–2022 school holidays, and now houses multiple classrooms for year 7s. Also arriving with the new year 7s in 2022 were multiple teachers from Modbury South Primary School.

=== Shooting incidents ===
In 2001, a 16-year old student brought a .303 high-powered rifle to the school and shot himself in the head on the library balcony, killing himself instantly.

In 2012, a year 8 student at the school took a revolver to the school and fired several bullets. No one was harmed during the incident. The student and his father were charged with possessing an unregistered, loaded firearm, possessing an unlicensed firearm and unsecured ammunition.

== Principals ==
- A.G. Strawbridge (1965–1975)
- J.G. Deer (1976–1985)
- R.M. Hill (1986–1999)
- Jay Strudwick (2000–2009)
- Martin Rumsby (2010–2016)
- Joanne Costa (2017–present)

== Co-curricular activities ==
=== Music ===
The school has an extensive involvement with musical activities. These activities include a concert band, a stage band and ensemble groups (brass, string and classical guitar). Performances are given at parent meetings, school assemblies, local primary schools and senior citizen venues throughout the year. Highlights in the music calendar include appearances at the Yamaha School Bands Festival and a trip for the Stage Band to Mount Gambier every May to compete in the Generations In Jazz, a nationwide competition.

=== Languages ===
The school has annual German & Japanese exchange programs. A student studying year 11 Japanese is annually invited to Kamogata on scholarship for 6 weeks at the end of the year. The school also hosts a group of students from Kamogata in August each year and responds with a reciprocal visit in September/October.

=== Sports ===
Modbury High School is a member of the Sports Association for Adelaide Schools (SAAS).

The school is heavily involved in the local VISTA sports competitions where students at the school can compete with students from schools in the extended district in a variety of sports.

The school also runs a biannual basketball trip to the USA allowing students from the school to play competitive basketball games against American students.

Pedal Prix is highly organised and competitive at Modbury High School. It fields five bikes at the local victoria park events and four bikes at the 24-hour Murray Bridge event.

The school has also produced various AFL players, including Paul Puopolo, Mitch Grigg, and Rhys O'Keeffe.

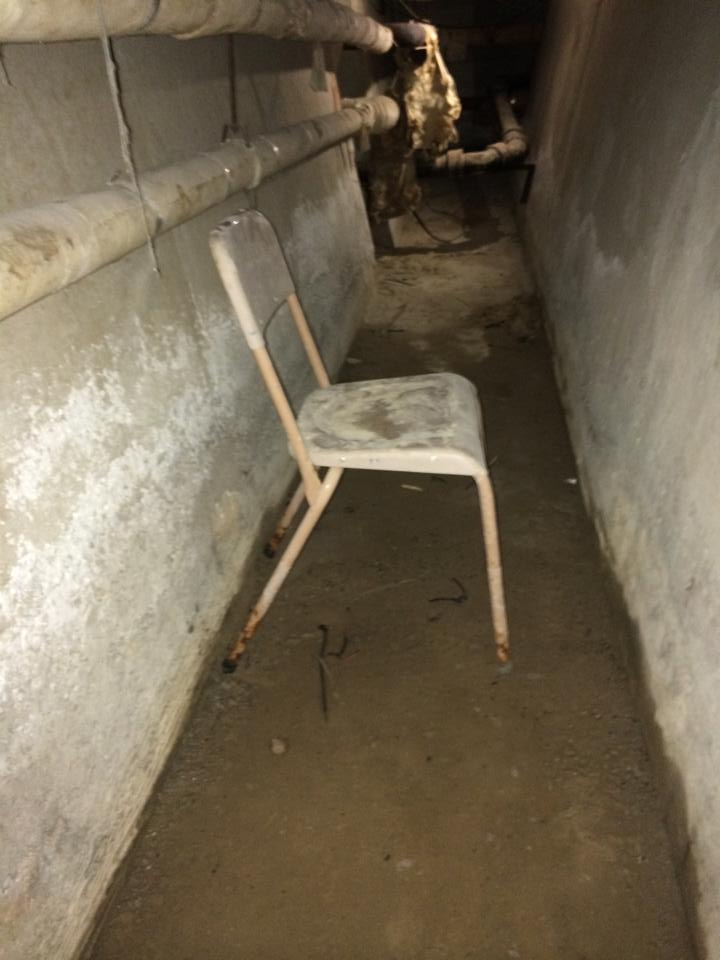
One of the chairs in the tunnel network beneath the school.

== Formula 1 in Schools ==
Modbury is attending the 2023 Aramco F1 in Schools World Finals in a collaboration with Brighton Grammar School.

F1 in Schools teams from Modbury High include:

- Aspect Racing (est. 2019)
- Infinity Racing (est. 2020)
- Aero Racing (est. 2021)
- Blaze Racing (est. 2022)

== Tunnels ==
Since the school was built there had long been rumours of tunnels beneath the school. In late 2014, several male students from years 9 to 11 broke off a board in the male toilets on the ground floor of the main building. They found a ladder which led down into a network of tunnels, containing an old archive, old chairs, tables and even an old anatomical skeleton model.

The tunnels were sealed by the school in the following weeks.

== Notes ==
A.As of 2022, most South Australian high schools will transition to enrolling year sevens, like other states.
