= Loxton High School =

Secondary school in South Australia

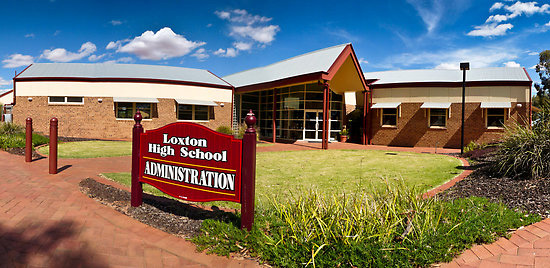
- The school's administration building

Location
- Bookpurnong Road; Loxton, South Australia, 5333; Australia; 34.443732°S 140.584808°E

Information
- School type: Public
- Established: 1959; 67 years ago
- Principal: Amy Evans
- Enrolment: 598 (2024)
- Colour
- Sports: Volleyball
- Website: http://www.loxtonhs.sa.edu.au/

Loxton High School is a public co-educational secondary school located in the Riverland town of Loxton, South Australia, approximately 250 km northeast of Adelaide. It is administered by the South Australian Department of Education, with an enrolment of 598 students and a teaching staff of 46 as of 2024. The school serves students from Year 7 to Year 12.

== History ==
Opened in 1959, the school was originally known as Loxton Area High School, but it was shortened to Loxton High School in 1963.

In 1979 Loxton High commenced its record-breaking run at the annual Riverland Interschool Athletics Carnival, and to date has not been beaten for the championship shield since. The school celebrated its 40th consecutive win in 2019.

The school underwent a major re-development between 2001 and 2004 with the completion of a new administration building, science laboratories, technology workshops and a gymnasium. The work was originally meant to be completed by December 2003, with initial costs exceeding 5 million. However, this number was increased to over 6.5 million and by its completion in late 2004, costs reached 7 million.

== Demographics ==
In 2022, the school had a student enrolment of 614 students with 49 teachers (43.9 full-time equivalent) and 17 non-teaching staff (13.5 full-time equivalent). Female enrolments consisted of 329 students and Male enrolments consisted of 285 students; Indigenous enrolments accounted for a total of 5% and 4% of students had a language background other than English.

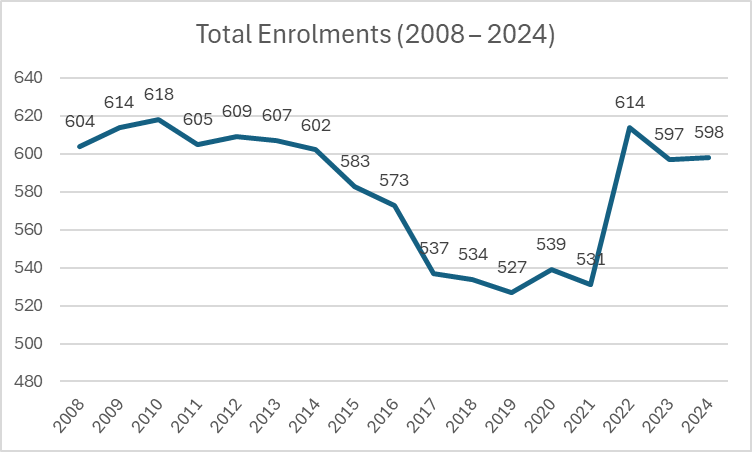
Loxton High School Enrolment Data from 2008 to 2024.

In 2023, the school had a student enrolment of 597 students with 46 teachers (41.3 full-time equivalent) and 17 non-teaching staff (14 full-time equivalent). Female enrolments consisted of 314 students and Male enrolments consisted of 283 students; Indigenous enrolments accounted for a total of 5% and 4% of students had a language background other than English.

In 2024, the school had a student enrolment of 598 students with 46 teachers (40.3 full-time equivalent) and 23 non-teaching staff (19 full-time equivalent). Female enrolments consisted of 319 students and Male enrolments consisted of 279 students; Indigenous enrolments accounted for a total of 6% and 5% of students had a language background other than English.

== Sport ==
The school currently competes competitively in Athletics, Triathlon, Cross Country, Swimming, Pedal Prix and Volleyball. Loxton High is currently ranked as the top triathlon school in the state, the second best athletics school, and the third best volleyball school (2012).

== Notable alumni ==
- Sophie Edington, Commonwealth Games gold medalist swimmer
- Zachery Schubert, Olympic beach volleyball player
- Darren Bartsch, Australian rules footballer
- Bruce Tschirpig, Australian rules footballer

== See also ==
- Education in South Australia
- List of schools in South Australia
