= Murrayville Community College =

Coordinates: 35°15′58″S 141°10′36″E

Murraville Community College
- Murrayville, Victoria; Australia

Information
- Type: Government school
- Motto: Persistence Respect Independence Determination Excellence
- Headmaster: Natasha Mudie
- Years: P–12
- Enrolment: 93 (41 girls, 52 boys)
- Campus: Francis St
- Colours: Blue, white & navy
- Slogan: providing an ideal environment for the development of young minds
- Website: www.murrayvillecc.vic.edu.au

Murrayville Community College is a State P–12 School located in the north western corner of the Mallee in Murrayville, Victoria.The school is the second most remote school in Victoria with 93 students attending the college from the Murrayville District, and Pinnaroo, South Australia and the nearest high school over 130 km away in Ouyen, Victoria. The College staff aim to provide a full range of opportunities for all students and to ensure they are not disadvantaged by their location. The school is heavily funded by the state government as to compensate for the notable isolation, and the college offers distance education programmes for students. The college participates as part of the Triple M (Murrayville, Managatang, and Werrimul) secondary school team in Regional sporting events such as swimming, athletics, and winter sports. Notable alumni include olympic basketballer Rachael Sporn.
