= Bendigo South East College =

Location
- 56 Ellis Street, Flora Hill; Bendigo, Victoria; Australia
- 36°46′35″S 144°17′51″E

Information
- Other name: BSE
- Former name: Flora Hill Secondary College
- Type: Secondary college
- Motto: Strive for Excellence
- Established: 1916 as Bendigo Girls School 1974 as Flora Hill High School and 2009 as Bendigo South East College.
- Principal: Justin Matt
- Years offered: 7-10
- Enrolment: 1,055 (2025)
- Campus: 2012 – Old Flora Hill Girls School Site
- Houses: Alexandra, Fortuna, Rosalind and Shamrock
- Colours: Royal blue, gold, green and red.
- Publication: Essence Magazine
- Website: bse.vic.edu.au

Bendigo South East College (BSE) also known as Bendigo South East Secondary College, is an Australian secondary school in Bendigo, Victoria, for year 7 to 10 students.

== History ==
BSE occupies a building originally known as the Bendigo Girls' School. That school had been founded in 1916, originally located in the Quarry Hill suburb of Bendigo but moving to the Flora Hill suburb in 1959.

In 1974, the school became co-educational, under the name Flora Hill High School, which was later renamed to Flora Hill Secondary College.

In 2008/2009 Flora Hill Secondary College and Golden Square Secondary College combined and were renamed Bendigo South East Secondary College.

As of 2013, the new buildings have been completed. The last of the classrooms from 1959 was demolished in August 2011. Although the main construction project has been finalised, the hall is still under renovation for the new athlete development program which was established in 2014.

Golden Square Secondary College was closed at the end of 2008 and was demolished in late 2009; the site has been replaced with Dja Dja Wurrung Corporate and Community Centre. The gymnasium has been bought by a private company, Jets Gymnastics.

== Leadership ==
As of May 2026, the BSE Principal Team includes:

- Justin Matt (Principal)
- Ange Tremain (Assistant Principal)
- Hamish Roberts (Assistant Principal)
- Steven Thorne (Assistant Principal)
- Tom Kuhne (Assistant Principal)

== Extra Curricular Activities ==
BSE offers a wide range of extra-curricular activities that cater for every student's personal interests, operating within and outside of school hours. Some available activities include: Athlete Development Program (ADP), Academy of Creative Arts (ACA), and Bendigo Instrumental Program (BIMP).

The Athlete Development Program at BSE is a complete sports education and training program aimed to assist select students in the pursuit of sporting excellence. The program runs for the entire school year. Students are eligible for selection every year they attend the school. Sessions consist of outside-of-school training on their sport of choice, and gym/health sessions that run in replacement of regular Physical Education classes.

Another specialist program introduced in 2016 is the Academy of Creative Arts (ACA). The Bendigo South East College Academy of Creative Arts (ACA) nurtures the creativity, artistry and scholarship of students. Students can apply to be in one of the five fields: drama, vocals, visual arts, music or dance.

The Bendigo Instrumental Music Program (BIMP) is a program that covers all 7-10 schools in Bendigo, not exclusively BSE. BIMP brings amazing instruments and talented teachers into schools to spark interests and build a deeper understanding of music, bands, composers and more. A wide selection of instruments is available for students to choose what feels right for them.

== See also ==
- Bendigo Senior Secondary College
- Crusoe Secondary College
- List of schools in Victoria
