= 2014 in Australia =

- Monarch: Elizabeth II
- Governor-General: (Dame) Quentin Bryce, then Sir Peter Cosgrove
- Prime minister: Tony Abbott
- Australian of the Year: Adam Goodes
- Elections: SA, TAS, WA Senate, VIC

The following lists events that happened during 2014 in Australia.

- Decades: 1990s; 2000s; 2010s; 2020s; 2030s
- See also: 2014 in Australian television; 2014 in Australian literature; Other events of 2014; Timeline of Australian history

== Incumbents ==
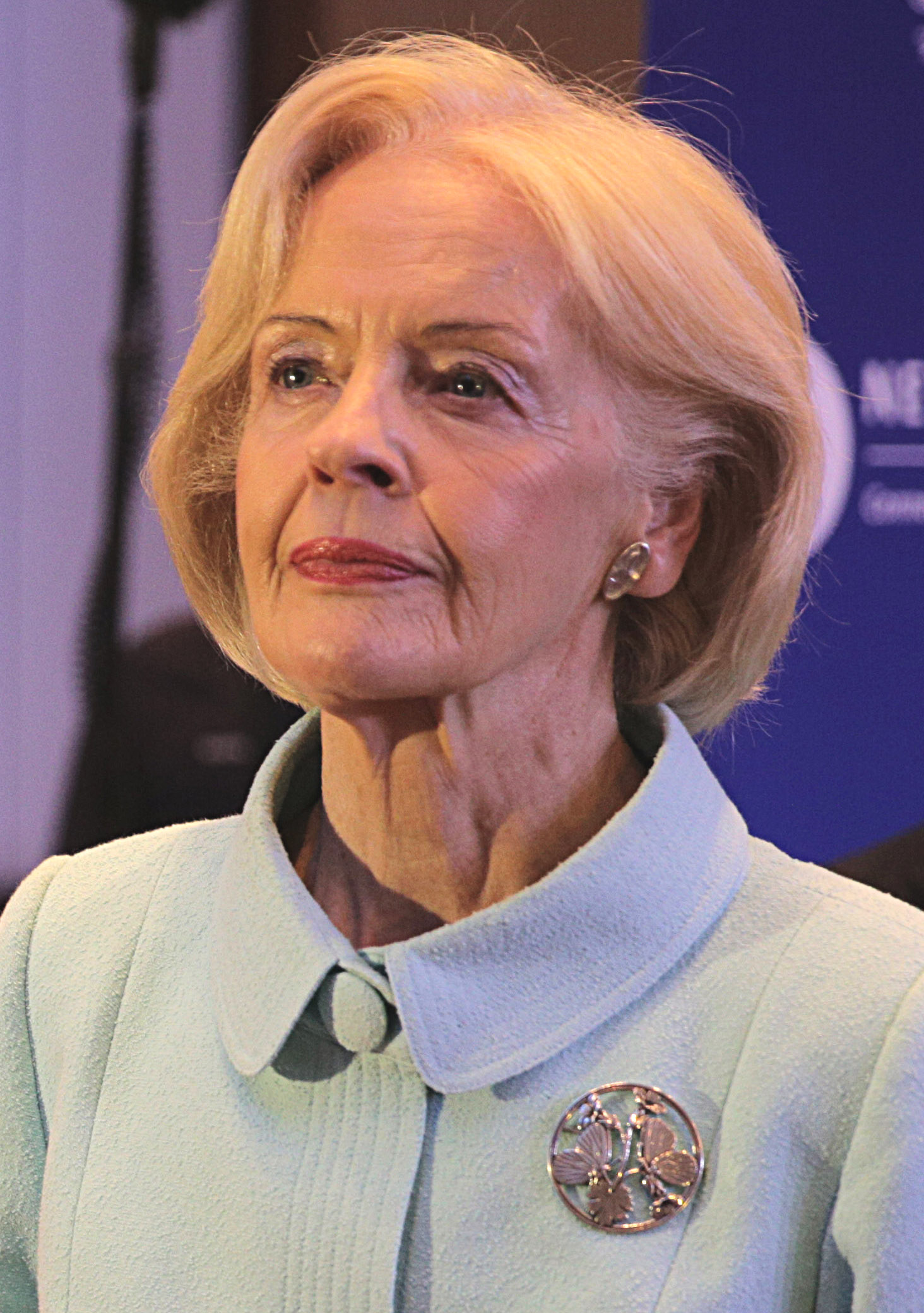
(Dame) Quentin Bryce

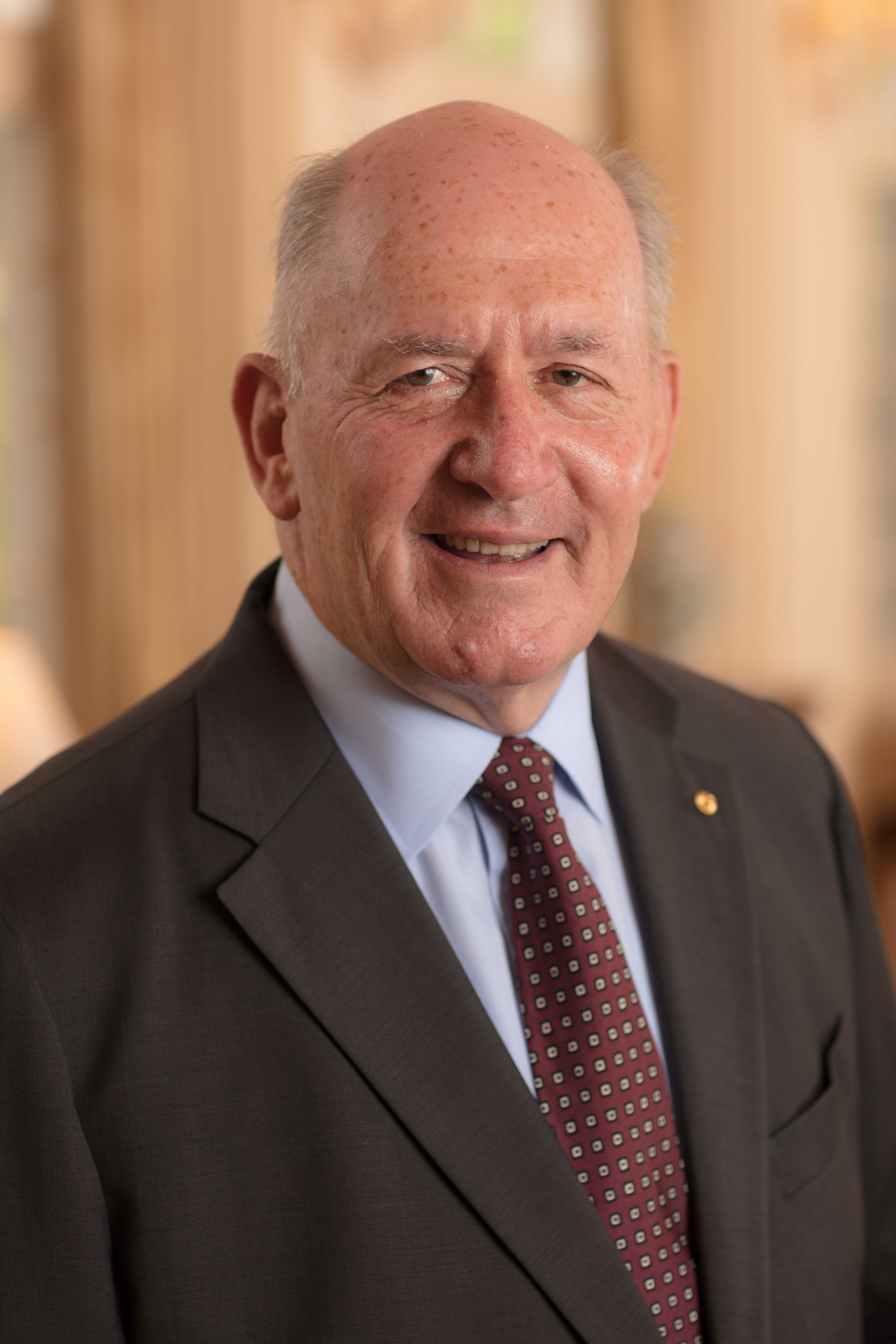
Sir Peter Cosgrove

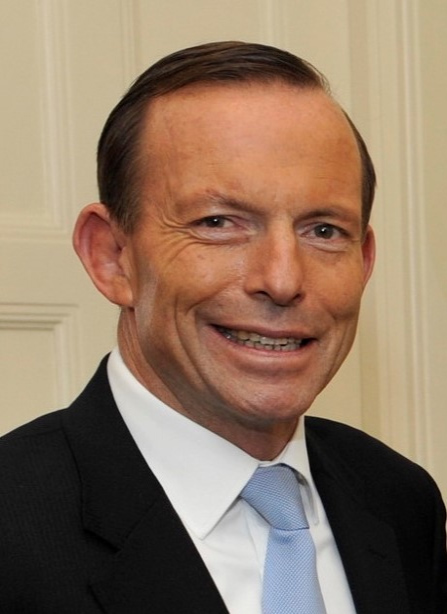
Tony Abbott

- Monarch – Elizabeth II
- Governor-General – (Dame) Quentin Bryce (until 28 March), then Sir Peter Cosgrove
- Prime Minister – Tony Abbott
  - Deputy Prime Minister – Warren Truss
  - Opposition Leader – Bill Shorten
- Chief Justice – Robert French

=== State and territory leaders ===
- Premier of New South Wales – Barry O'Farrell (until 17 April), then Mike Baird
  - Opposition Leader – John Robertson (until 23 December)
- Premier of Queensland – Campbell Newman
  - Opposition Leader – Annastacia Palaszczuk
- Premier of South Australia – Jay Weatherill
  - Opposition Leader – Steven Marshall
- Premier of Tasmania – Lara Giddings (until 31 March), then Will Hodgman
  - Opposition Leader – Will Hodgman (until 31 March), then Bryan Green
- Premier of Victoria – Denis Napthine (until 4 December), then Daniel Andrews
  - Opposition Leader – Daniel Andrews (until 4 December), then Matthew Guy
- Premier of Western Australia – Colin Barnett
  - Opposition Leader – Mark McGowan
- Chief Minister of the Australian Capital Territory – Katy Gallagher (until 11 December), then Andrew Barr
  - Opposition Leader – Jeremy Hanson
- Chief Minister of the Northern Territory – Adam Giles
  - Opposition Leader – Delia Lawrie
- Chief Minister of Norfolk Island – Lisle Snell

=== Governors and administrators ===
- Governor of New South Wales – (Dame) Marie Bashir (until 1 October), then David Hurley
- Governor of Queensland – Penelope Wensley (until 29 July), then Paul de Jersey
- Governor of South Australia – Kevin Scarce (until 7 August), then Hieu Van Le (from 1 September)
- Governor of Tasmania – Peter Underwood (until 7 July), then Kate Warner (from 10 December)
- Governor of Victoria – Alex Chernov
- Governor of Western Australia – Malcolm McCusker (until 30 June), then Kerry Sanderson
- Administrator of the Australian Indian Ocean Territories – Jon Stanhope (until 5 October), then Barry Haase
- Administrator of Norfolk Island – Neil Pope (until 30 June), then Gary Hardgrave
- Administrator of the Northern Territory – Sally Thomas (until 10 November), then John Hardy

== Events ==
=== January ===
- 1 January – The University of Ballarat merges with the Gippsland campus of Monash University to form, Federation University Australia.
- 4 January – Stradbroke Island suffers bushfires which burn out over 8,500 hectares (21,004 acres) of bushland.
- 12–15 January – Perth Hills Fire; A total of 55 homes were razed, 1 fatality, and a damage bill in excess of $13 million.
- 15–20 January – Grampians Fire – A fire starts as a result of lightning strikes in the northern Grampians National Park on 15 January. Extreme fire conditions on 17 January saw the fire grow in size to over 50,000 hectares (123,553 acres). The fire was brought under control on 18 January. By the time the fire is contained on 20 January, it had burnt out 55,000 hectares (135,908 acres) hectares. The estimated losses included 90 structures, 32 homes and 3000 sheep.
- 20 January – New South Wales Premier Barry O'Farrell uses special legislation to cancel three coal licences worth hundreds of millions of dollars issued by corrupt former Labor minister Ian Macdonald and deny the companies that own them any compensation.
- 21 January – New South Wales Premier Barry O'Farrell announces the introduction of laws to prevent "one-hit punches", including mandatory eight-year jail sentences for fatal one-punch attacks fuelled by alcohol, in an effort to curb alcohol-related violence in Sydney. The laws also include expanded Sydney CBD CBD lockouts, a freeze on new liquor licences, and the statewide closure of bottle shops at 10:00pm.
- 23 January – Prime Minister Tony Abbott addresses the World Economic Forum in Davos, Switzerland.
- 26 January – West Australian Premier Colin Barnett defends the government's catch-and-kill policy, which had been announced the previous month, after the first shark under the policy was caught on bailed drum lines off the state's south-west coast the previous day.
- 28 January – General Peter Cosgrove is announced as the next Governor-General of Australia.
- 30 January –
  - Tropical Cyclone Dylan dumps heavy rain on north and central Queensland.
  - The Federal Government rejects a $25 million assistance request from SPC Ardmona, a fruit processing company which sought help from the Victorian and Federal governments to restructure its operations, arguing the high Australian dollar and cheap imports had made it hard to compete. Prime Minister Tony Abbott says SPC Ardmona's parent company, Coca-Cola Amatil, has the resources to carry out that restructure without the need for government funding.

=== February ===
- 4 February – Ken Smith resigns as Speaker of the Victorian Parliament after launching an attack on independent MP Geoff Shaw during the first question time of the year, being replaced by deputy speaker Christine Fyffe. Smith told Parliament that Shaw had been "colluding" with Labor to destabilise the state government.
- 8 February – Terri Butler retains the seat of Griffith (formerly held by Prime Minister Kevin Rudd) over Bill Glasson in the Griffith by-election.
- 9 February – Bushfires north of Melbourne and in Gippsland destroy over 30 houses.
- 10 February – Toyota Australia announces it will cease manufacturing vehicles and engines in Australia by the end of 2017.
  - Convicted drug smuggler Schapelle Corby is released on parole from Bali's Kerobokan jail.
- 13 February – Cameron Baird is posthumously awarded the Victoria Cross for Australia for his actions in the War in Afghanistan.
  - Victorian Premier Denis Napthine announces a $22 million assistance package for SPC Ardmona, Australia's largest food processor and packaging company to transform and modernize its operations at the company's Shepparton plant.
- 18 February – The Australian Federal Police carries out raids on the offices of Channel Seven in Sydney in relation to the network's bid for an interview with convicted drug smuggler, Schapelle Corby.
- 22 February – Labor candidate Yvette D'Ath wins the 2014 Redcliffe state by-election in Queensland.
  - Media personality Charlotte Dawson is found dead in her Woolloomooloo apartment after committing suicide.

=== March ===
- 10 March – West Australian Premier Colin Barnett announces the resignation of the State's Treasurer, Troy Buswell due to an accident involving his ministerial car. Mr. Barnett said that Mr. Buswell has had a breakdown and has been hospitalised over recent weeks.
- 13 March –
  - The Royal Commission into Trade Union Governance and Corruption begins its inquiry.
  - Brett Peter Cowan is found guilty of murdering teenager Daniel Morcombe in December 2003. Mr Cowan is sentenced to life in jail with a minimum non-parole period of 20 years on 14 March.
- 15 March – State elections are held in South Australia and Tasmania. The Liberal Party defeats the Giddings Labor government in Tasmania, after 16 years in opposition. In South Australia, the result is a hung parliament, with Jay Weatherill's Labor government remaining in power after the support of one of the crossbench independents.
- 25 March – Prime Minister Tony Abbott announces that the titles of knights and dames will be reintroduced into the Order of Australia honours list after being abolished in 1986. The first to receive the award will be the outgoing Governor-General, the Queen's representative in Australia, who will be known as Dame Quentin Bryce. Incoming Governor-General Peter Cosgrove and all future holders of the post will also receive the honour.
- 27 March – Labor MP Tony Burke attempts, but fails, to pass a motion of no confidence in the Speaker of the Australian House of Representatives, Bronwyn Bishop, accusing her of bias, incompetence and inconsistency during Question time.
- 30 March – It is announced that former Defence Force Chief Angus Houston will lead the search for missing Malaysia Airlines Flight MH370 by heading a new Joint Agency Co-ordination Centre to be established in Perth, Western Australia.

=== April ===
- 5 April – A special election is held for six Senate seats from Western Australia, following the voiding of results due to the loss of 1,375 ballot papers in the 2013 federal election.
- 11 April – Cyclone Ita makes landfall near Cape Flattery north of Cooktown, Queensland.
- 15 April – The Federal Government designates Badgerys Creek as the site for the Second Sydney Airport, referring to it as the Western Sydney Airport.
- 16 April –
  - Barry O'Farrell states his intention to resign as Premier of New South Wales after giving misleading evidence to the Independent Commission Against Corruption.
  - William, Prince of Wales and Catherine, Princess of Wales (then Duke and Duchess of Cambridge) conduct their first official tour of Australia with their son Prince George.
- 17 April – Mike Baird becomes Premier of New South Wales following the resignation of Barry O'Farrell.

=== May ===
- 13 May – Federal Treasurer Joe Hockey delivers the 2014 Australian federal budget, the first budget of the Abbott Government. The budget features significant structural reform to redress a growing deficit. This includes a dramatic downsizing of government bureaucracy. It also contained significant changes to welfare, new initiatives for a medical research fund and spending on roads. A budget surplus is not expected until 2023. A controversial measure is the implementation of a $7 co-payment for patients' visits to general practitioners, to take effect from 1 July 2015.
- 23 May – Queensland MP Chris Davis quits as Member for Stafford after he could not support the Newman government's move that only political donations of more than $12,400 would have to be declared to the Electoral Commission. Dr Davis was sacked Assistant Health Minister a week earlier after he spoke out against doctor contracts and changes to the Crime and Misconduct Commission.
- 27 May – Speaker of the House of Representatives, Bronwyn Bishop, rejects allegations she breached protocol as Speaker by hosting a Liberal Party fundraiser in the Speaker's suite and says she will not be bound by stricter party political requirements agreed between Labor and the Greens which require the Speaker not to attend Party caucus meetings.

=== June ===
- 3 June – Queensland Treasurer Tim Nicholls hands down the State budget, revealing the Government's plans to privatise $33.6 billion worth of assets to bring the budget back into surplus. The Government blames a crash in coal royalties and a deferral of federal disaster relief payments for the blowout. Resources for sale include long-term leases on the Townsville and Gladstone Ports, and selling power companies Stanwell and CS energy, despite public fervour against privatising assets in the state.
- 12 June – Queensland Premier Campbell Newman announces that Tim Carmody will be the next Chief Justice of Queensland, sparking controversy among the legal profession over Mr. Carmody's elevation to the role from the position of Chief Magistrate. Mr. Carmody's strong public support for the Newman government's anti-bikie (VLAD) laws was also critically viewed as a factor in his appointment.
- 19 June – West Australian Premier Colin Barnett suggests that there will be further spending cuts to deliver a promised budget surplus if the iron ore price does not recover. The price of iron ore had slid below the benchmark level of $US90 a tonne for the first time since September 2012 after a drop in demand from China, being down 34 per cent for the year.
- 27 June – The inaugural Vision Splendid Outback Film Festival gets underway in the town of Winton in Central West Queensland.
- 29 June – NRL player Todd Carney is sacked from the Cronulla Sharks due to a photograph leaked on social media in which he appears to urinate into his mouth, a practice colloquially known as "bubbling".
- 30 June – A London jury finds Australian entertainer, Rolf Harris, guilty of indecently assaulting four girls in Britain between 1968 and 1986. Calls are made by locals from Mr Harris' home town of Bassendean, Western Australia for the removal of memorial plaques placed in Harris' honour.

=== July ===
- 8 July – New Queensland Chief Justice Tim Carmody is sworn in at a private ceremony in Brisbane's court district, the first time in almost a century that the state's new Chief Justice is sworn in behind closed doors – a move which prompts further criticism from the legal profession.
- 15 July – A Queensland Supreme Court jury finds Gerard Baden-Clay guilty of murdering his wife Allison in April 2012 and he is given a sentence of life imprisonment. In December 2015 the charge was downgraded to manslaughter.
- 18 July – 38 Australians are confirmed as among the 300 people on board killed in Malaysia Airlines Flight MH17 crashed with 193 Dutch nationals in Eastern Ukraine near the Russian border, including the Australian novelist and reviewer Liam Davison.
- 19 July – Queensland Labor MP, Anthony Lynham wins the 2014 Stafford state by-election in Brisbane with a 17.2 per cent swing against the LNP candidate Bob Anderson.

=== August ===
- 2 August – Death of Ms Dhu
- 8 August – New Zealand woman Warriena Tagpuno Wright falls to her death from the balcony of a Surfers Paradise apartment owned by Gable Tostee, a 28-year-old man whom she met on dating app Tinder. The incident subsequently receives international coverage.
- 14 August – New South Wales Premier Mike Baird is forced to declare that he has never accepted an illegal donation after repeatedly failing to give the guarantee in Parliament, after Government Swansea MP Garry Edwards is moved to the crossbench over allegations of receiving tainted funds.
- 18 August – Former treasurer Wayne Swan addresses the National Press Club of Australia, defending his economic legacy and attacks the budget measures of the Abbott Government. He said it would not be long before "necessity" forced a future government to return to carbon pricing and a tax on natural resources.

=== September ===
- 2 September – Former Kenyan presidential candidate Quincy Timberlake is charged with murder in Brisbane.
- 3 September – Two species of dendrogramma, found off the coast of Australia in 1986, are discovered to be unclassifiable in any existing phylum.
- 9 September – New South Wales farmer Geoff Hunt kills his wife and three children before turning the gun on himself.
- 12 September –
  - Australia raises its terror threat level to high following concerns about militants returning from conflicts in Iraq and Syria.
  - Australian actress Nicole Kidman's father, Antony Kidman, dies after a fall in Singapore.
- 14 September – Australia sends combat aircraft and special forces to the Middle East to help in the fight against Islamic State of Iraq and the Levant.
- 17 September – Queensland Treasurer Tim Nicholls announces that the Queensland Government is looking at potentially leasing ports, power stations and distribution assets, for periods of 50 to 99 years as an alternative to selling those assets.
- 18 September – Australian police mount raids in the cities of Sydney and Brisbane on alleged Islamic State of Iraq and the Levant sympathisers based on intelligence claims that they were planning a public execution in Australia with fifteen people arrested.
- 19 September – Australia raises security for its Parliament after conducting raids that arrest dozens of suspected terrorists.

=== October ===
- 5 October – Mayang Prasetyo, an Indonesian transgender woman is murdered and cooked by her husband, chef Marcus Peter Volke, at their Teneriffe apartment in Brisbane. Mr Volke slit his own throat after fleeing from police.
- 8 October – A rare total lunar eclipse occurred in Canberra which the moon is blood red. Keen astronomers gathered at Mount Stromlo Observatory on this night.
- 9 October – A Cairns nurse is admitted to hospital after fears she may have been the first case of the Ebola virus. She is later tested negative.
- 14 October – The storm that hit Sydney was described as a once in a century event. Marrickville, Canterbury and Sydney Airport had a torrent of rainfall in as many as three hours and what you'd expect to see in one location about once every 20 years.
- 21 October – Gough Whitlam, Australia's 21st Prime Minister, dies at the age of 98. He was well known for the 1975 Australian constitutional crisis, which saw him dismissed as Prime Minister. Also, for bringing about the Anti-Discrimination Act, making university free and eradicating the last remnants of the Immigration Restriction Act (1901).
- 23 October – 3 people are shot dead in North Western Victoria over a neighbourly dispute by Ian Jamieson.
- 31 October – Former Prime Minister, Julia Gillard has managed to clear her name after the Royal Commission into trade unions has found her not guilty of corruption or criminal conduct

=== November ===
- 5 November – A public memorial service is held at Sydney Town Hall to honour former Prime Minister, Gough Whitlam. Former Prime Ministers Julia Gillard and Kevin Rudd are temporarily embarrassed when it appears that they have been seated next to each other during the service.
- 7 November – Palmer United Senator Jacqui Lambie declares she'll vote against every piece of Government legislation until the Federal Government improves its proposed below inflation 1.5 per cent pay rise for defence force personnel.
- 8 November – Prime Minister Tony Abbott and Victorian Premier Denis Napthine announce a $250 million Commonwealth-State partnership to complete the upgrade of the Tullamarine Freeway to Melbourne Airport, creating 200 jobs.
- 10 November – Prime Minister Tony Abbott arrives in Beijing for the APEC Summit.
- 13 November – Divisions within the Palmer United Party become more public with Clive Palmer labelling his Senator, Jacqui Lambie a "drama queen".
- 15–16 November – The 2014 G-20 summit is held in Brisbane.
- 18 November – India's Prime minister Narendra Modi makes a speech to Federal Parliament in which he expresses his desire for Australian resources to fuel development in India.
- 19 November – Communications Minister Malcolm Turnbull announces in Adelaide that the nation's two public broadcasters, the ABC and SBS, will lose more than $300 million in funding over the next five years, prompting subsequent public criticism that the Federal Government had broken an election promise not to cut funding to these two public broadcasting channels.
- 22 November – Foreign Minister Julie Bishop warns the UN Security Council not to be complacent in the fight against Ebola.
- 24 November – Senator Jacqui Lambie quits the Palmer United Party to become an independent.
- 29 November – A state election is held in Victoria. The Labor Party led by Daniel Andrews defeats the incumbent Coalition government of Denis Napthine—the first defeat of a one-term government in Victoria since 1955.

=== December ===
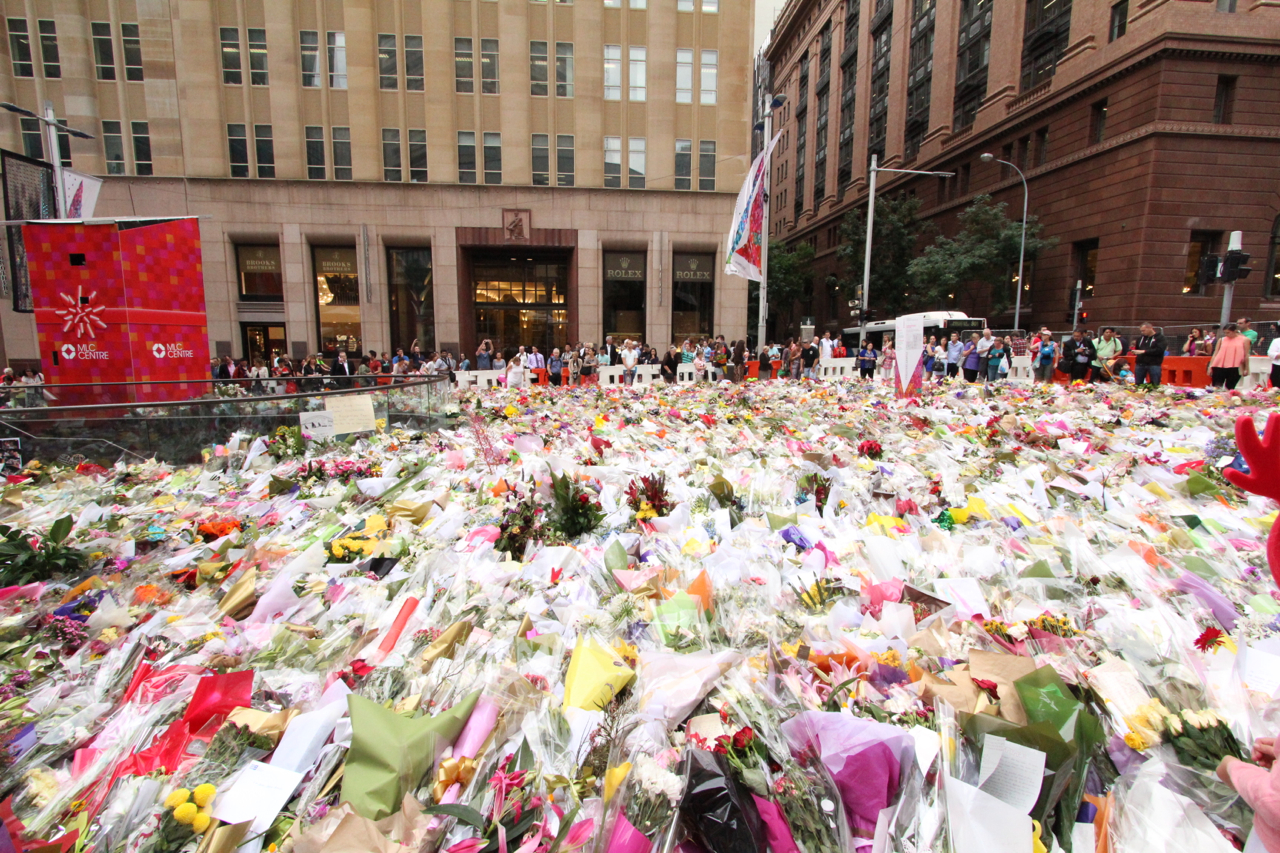
Bouquets in Martin Place following the 2014 Sydney hostage crisis

- 3 December – The funeral of cricketer Phillip Hughes is held in his home town of Macksville.
- 7 December –
  - Prime Minister Tony Abbott announces changes to the government's paid parental leave scheme such as the introduction of means testing and the cutting off of eligibility for women earning $150,000 a year or more, but left the elaboration of the finer details of the changes for a later date.
  - Queensland Liberal-National Party MP Bruce Flegg is dumped from his seat of Moggill.
- 9 December –
  - A court in Lismore convicts former National Rugby League player Craig Field of the manslaughter of Kelvin Kane outside the Kingscliff Hotel in 2012.
  - Prime Minister Tony Abbott announces that the Federal Government will abandon plans to introduce the controversial $7 Medicare co-payment.
- 11 December – Prime Minister Tony Abbott publicly defends his chief of staff, Peta Credlin, against growing criticism from within his own party, levelling accusations of sexism against her critics.
- 13 December – The Federal Government announces that it will scrap over 200 government agencies.
- 15 December –
  - Man Haron Monis takes customers and staff hostage in a Lindt Chocolate Café in Martin Place, Sydney.
  - Federal Treasurer Joe Hockey is criticised for delivering his Mid Year Fiscal Outlook when the nation's attention is diverted by the Martin Place siege. Mr Hockey announces that foreign aid will be slashed by $3.7 billion in order to boost national security spending.
- 16 December – The hostage situation in Martin Place ends with gunman Man Haron Monis and two hostages dead and four others injured.
- 19 December – Queensland Police announce the finding that eight children were stabbed to death in a home in Cairns.
- 20 December – Queensland police arrest an Australian mother for murder in the stabbing deaths of eight children.
- 22 December –
  - Prime Minister Tony Abbott causes controversy and is accused of sexism when he states that women are particularly "focused on the household budget" – a budget which he claimed was about $550 a year better off with the carbon tax gone.
  - Amirah Droudis, former partner of Man Monis, the Martin Place gunman, is refused bail.
- 23 December –
  - The new Federal Cabinet is sworn in.
  - Separate funerals take place in Sydney for Katrina Dawson and Tori Johnson, the victims of the 2014 Sydney hostage crisis.
  - The Victorian Supreme Court approves a $494.7 million payout to be awarded to the victims of the Black Saturday bushfires in what is the nation's largest class-action settlement.
- 28 December –
  - Intense rain in Queensland and New South Wales causes flooding in some areas. 300 mm is recorded in Tweed Heads and flooding cuts access to some roads.
  - John Bjelke-Petersen, son of former Queensland Premier Sir Joh Bjelke-Petersen, is declared the Queensland leader of the Palmer United Party.
- 30 December – Foreign Minister Julie Bishop confirms that Australia has sent AP-3C Orions to help with the search for missing Air Asia flight QZ8501.
- 31 December – Australia concludes its two-year term on the United Nations Security Council. Australia decides to vote against a Palestinian-proposed United Nations resolution that demanded the end of Israeli occupation within three years. Australia is one of only two nations, along with the United States, Israel's closest ally, to vote against the resolution.
- Throughout the year – 2014 Australian human powered vehicle season

== Arts and literature ==
- 26 June – Evie Wyld wins the 2014 Miles Franklin Award for her novel All The Birds, Singing.
- 18 July – Fiona Lowry wins the 2014 Archibald Prize for her portrait of architect Penelope Seidler.
- 14 October – Australian author Richard Flanagan wins the 2014 Man Booker Prize for his novel The Narrow Road to the Deep North.

== Sport ==
- 7 January – Cricket: The 2013–14 Ashes series concludes, with Australia defeating England 5–0 in a five-Test series.
- 26 January – Cycling: The 2014 Tour Down Under concludes, with Simon Gerrans winning the overall classification for a record third time.
- 25 January – Tennis: The women's singles tournament concludes at the 2014 Australian Open, with Li Na defeating Dominika Cibulková in the final.
- 26 January – Tennis: The men's singles tournament concludes at the 2014 Australian Open, with Stanislas Wawrinka defeating Rafael Nadal in the final.
- February – Australia competes at the 2014 Winter Olympics in Sochi, winning three medals.
- 7 February – Cricket: The 2013–14 Big Bash League season concludes, with the Perth Scorchers defeating the Hobart Hurricanes in the final.
- 8 February – Baseball: The 2013–14 Australian Baseball League season concludes, with the Perth Heat defeating the Canberra Cavalry in the finals series.
- 22 February – Rugby League: 2013 NRL premiers the Sydney Roosters defeat Super League XVIII champions the Wigan Warriors 36–14 in the 2014 World Club Challenge, held at Allianz Stadium.
- 23 February – Soccer: The 2013–14 W-League season concludes, with Melbourne Victory defeating Brisbane Roar in the grand final.
- 16 March – Motorsport: The 2014 Australian Grand Prix is held, with Nico Rosberg winning for Mercedes AMG Petronas.
- 25 March – Cricket: The 2013–14 Sheffield Shield season concludes, with New South Wales drawing with Western Australia in the final to claim the title.
- 13 April – Basketball: The 2013–14 NBL season concludes, with the Perth Wildcats defeating the Adelaide 36ers in the finals series.
- 4 May – Soccer: The 2013–14 A-League season concludes, with Brisbane Roar FC defeating Western Sydney Wanderers FC 2–1 after extra time in the final.
- 28 May – Rugby league: New South Wales defeat Queensland 12–8 at Suncorp Stadium in the first match of the 2014 State of Origin series. NSW fullback Jarryd Hayne is awarded Man of the Match.
- 18 June – Rugby league: New South Wales win the 2014 State of Origin series, defeating Queensland 6–4 at ANZ Stadium in the second match. It is their first series victory since 2005. NSW prop and captain Paul Gallen is awarded Man of the Match.
- 22 June – Netball: The 2014 ANZ Championship season concludes, with the Melbourne Vixens defeating the Queensland Firebirds in the grand final.
- 9 July – Rugby league: The 2014 State of Origin series concludes, with Queensland defeating New South Wales 32–8 at Suncorp Stadium in the third match, though New South Wales had already won the series. Queensland lock Corey Parker is awarded Man of the Match, while NSW prop and captain Paul Gallen is awarded the Wally Lewis Medal for player of the series.
- 22 July – Australian rules football: The 2014 Foxtel Cup concludes, with Williamstown defeating West Perth in the grand final.
- July/August – Australia competes at the 2014 Commonwealth Games in Glasgow, winning 137 medals.
- 2 August – Rugby union: The 2014 Super Rugby season concludes, with the New South Wales Waratahs defeating the Crusaders in the final.
- 7 September – Rugby league: The Sydney Roosters win their second straight minor premiership following the final main round of the 2014 NRL season. The Cronulla-Sutherland Sharks finish in last position, claiming their first wooden spoon since 1969.
- 27 September – Australian rules football: Hawthorn defeats the Sydney Swans 21.11 (137) to 11.8 (74) in the 2014 AFL Grand Final.
- 5 October – Rugby league: The South Sydney Rabbitohs defeat the Canterbury-Bankstown Bulldogs 30–6 in the 2014 NRL Grand Final for their first premiership win since 1971. Rabbitohs lock Sam Burgess is awarded the Clive Churchill Medal for man-of-the-match. Pre-game entertainment is headlined by Slash featuring Myles Kennedy and the Conspirators, along with Train.
- 25 October and 1 November – Soccer: The Western Sydney Wanderers FC defeat Al-Hilal FC 1–0 on aggregate to become the first Australian club to win the 2014 AFC Champions League.
- 4 November – Horse racing: Protectionist wins the 2014 Melbourne Cup. Race favourite and Caulfield Cup winner Admire Rakti collapses and dies of a cardiac arrest after finishing last in the race. Another horse, Araldo, is euthanised after sustaining a leg injury when spooked by a spectator.
- 25 November – Cricket: Phillip Hughes was knocked unconscious by a bouncer during a Sheffield Shield match at the Sydney Cricket Ground. He never regained consciousness and died two days later.
- 28 December – Yacht racing: Wild Oats XI takes line honours in the 2014 Sydney to Hobart Yacht Race, the yacht's eighth win.

== Deaths ==
=== January ===
- 1 January – Michael Glennon, 69, Roman Catholic priest and convicted child molester
- 4 January – Shirley Jeffrey, 74, marine biologist
- 5 January – Arthur Gietzelt, 93, Senator for New South Wales, Minister for Veterans' Affairs (1983–1987)
- 9 January –
  - Bryan Fairfax, 83, conductor
  - Charlie Bazzano, 90, Olympic cyclist
- 7 January – Phil Ryan, 98, football player and administrator (Hawthorn).
- 21 January – Rhonda Small, 88, filmmaker (died in United Kingdom)
- 24 January – Boyd Oxlade, 70, author and screenwriter (Death in Brunswick)
- 26 January – Paula Gruden, 92, poet
- 28 January – Bill Pritchett, 92, public servant and Secretary of Department of Defence

=== February ===
- 1 February – Dave Power, 85, track and field athlete
- 2 February – Craig Lahiff, 66, film director
- 3 February – Max Howell, 86, rugby union player and educator
- 6 February – John Vockler, 89, Anglican prelate, Bishop of Polynesia (1962–1968)
- 8 February – Michael Denborough, 84, medical researcher and politician, founder of the Nuclear Disarmament Party.
- 14 February – Marshall Browne, 78, crime fiction writer
- 15 February – James Condon, 90, actor
- 15 February – George Coates, 90, football player (Fitzroy)
- 21 February – Matthew Robinson, 28, Paralympic snowboarder.
- 22 February – Charlotte Dawson, 47, television personality

=== March ===
- 8 March –
  - Wendy Hughes, 61, actress
  - Roy Higgins, 75, jockey
- 11 March –
  - Dean Bailey, 47, football player (Essendon) and coach (Melbourne)
  - Len Buckeridge, 77, billionaire construction executive, founder of BGC, heart attack
- 12 March – Cecil Abbott, 89, police chief, Commissioner of New South Wales Police (1981–1984).
- 14 March – Warwick Parer, 77, Senator for Queensland, Minister for Resources and Energy (1996–1998)
- 23 March – Jack Clancy, 79, football player
- 26 March –
  - John Disney, 94, ornithologist
  - Tom Jones, 90, politician, Member for Collie (1968–1989)
- 28 March –
  - Billy Longley, 88, criminal
  - Michael Putney, 67, Roman Catholic prelate, Bishop of Townsville (since 2001)
- 29 March – Robin Gibson, 83, architect (Queensland Cultural Centre)
- 31 March – David Hannay, 74, film producer

=== April ===
- 1 April – Harry Rowe, 89, football and cricket player
- 2 April – Everett De Roche, 67, screenwriter
- 4 April – Len Ardill, 83, politician, member of the Legislative Assembly of Queensland for Salisbury (1986–1992) and Archerfield (1992–1998).
- 8 April – Robert Dickson, 88, architect
- 9 April – Gil Askey, 89, musician and composer (Lady Sings the Blues).
- 10 April –
  - George Bornemissza, 90, Australian entomologist and ecologist.
  - Doris Pilkington Garimara, 76, author (Follow the Rabbit-Proof Fence)
- 14 April – Brian Harradine, 79, Senator for Tasmania (1975–2005)
- 18 April – Dylan Tombides, 20, soccer player (died in England)
- 20 April – Neville Wran, 87, Premier of New South Wales (1976–1986)
- 26 April – Joan Bruce, 86, actress.
- 27 April – Harry Firth, 96, racing driver and team manager
- 28 April –
  - Derek King, 65, VFL footballer (St Kilda)
  - Ryan Tandy, 32, rugby league player
- 29 April – Gailene Stock, 68, ballet dancer and executive, Director of the Royal Ballet School (since 1999)
- 30 April – Ian Ross, 73, television newsreader

=== May ===
- 1 May –
  - Paul Ramsay, 78, businessman
  - Peter Ruscuklic, 58, VFL football player (Fitzroy, Geelong)
- 6 May – Lex Watson, 71, LGBT rights activist and political scientist
- 7 May – Sir Neville McNamara, 91, Chief of the Defence Force Staff (1982–84)
- 8 May –
  - Harry Potter, 72, journalist.
  - Alan Woodman, 58, VFL football player (Geelong)
- 9 May – Bob Hoysted, 88, racehorse trainer.
- 11 May –
  - Reg Gasnier, 74, rugby league footballer and coach
  - Ivan Wingreen, 52, South African cricketer
- 12 May –
  - Tom Hafey, 82, Australian rules football player and coach
  - Leroy Serisier, 86, politician, member of the New South Wales Legislative Council (1970–1978).
- 13 May – David Malet Armstrong, 87, philosopher
- 16 May – Ruth Tarvydas, 66, fashion designer
- 19 May –
  - Sir Jack Brabham, 88, racing car driver
  - Peter Curtin, 70, actor
- 22 May –
  - Laurie Hill, 71, VFL football player (Collingwood)
  - Wes Lofts, 71, VFL football player and administrator (Carlton)
- 29 May – Ian Norman, 75, Australian business executive, co-founder of Harvey Norman

=== June ===
- 3 June – Gordon Bennett, 59, artist
- 4 June – Doc Neeson, 67, musician (The Angels)
- 6 June –
  - Don Banfield, 97, politician and trade unionist.
  - Brian Miller, 93, politician, member of the Tasmanian Legislative Council (1957–1986).
- 7 June –
  - Jane Gray, 112, supercentenarian, oldest living Scottish-born person and Australian resident
  - Merv Thackeray, 88, politician, member of the Legislative Assembly of Queensland for Keppel (1957–1960) and Rockhampton North (1960–1972).
- 8 June –
  - Ken Doubleday, 88, Olympic hurdler and triple jumper (1952, 1956)
  - Harold Russell Maddock, 96, jockey
- 10 June – Gary Gilmour, 62, cricketer
- 13 June – Jim Keays, 67, musician (The Masters Apprentices)
- 17 June – Paul England, 85, race car driver
- 18 June – Ray Evans, 79, business executive and political activist, co-founder of the Lavoisier Group
- 24 June – Jacqueline Jarrett Goodnow, 89, cognitive psychologist.
- 25 June – Derek Fielding, 84, librarian and author.
- 26 June – Ron Hall, 68, Australian NTFA football player (Scottsdale)
- 27 June – Rex Whitehead, 65, cricket umpire

=== July ===
- 1 July –Graeme McMahon, 74, Chairman of Essendon Football Club (1996–2003)
- 2 July –
  - Lorraine Elliott, 70, politician, Victoria MLA for Mooroolbark (1992–2002)
  - Mervyn Finlay, 89, judge and rower, Olympic bronze medalist (1952), member of the Supreme Court of New South Wales (1984–2004)
- 3 July – Peter Dawkins, 68, record producer (Dragon, Australian Crawl, Air Supply) and musician
- 4 July –
  - Myer Fredman, 82, conductor
  - Archibald Wilson, 93, fighter pilot, flew for the Royal Air Force during World War II
- 5 July – John Jobst, 94, Roman Catholic prelate, Bishop of Broome (1959–1995)
- 7 July – Peter Underwood, 76, Governor of Tasmania and Chief Justice of the Supreme Court of Tasmania
- 9 July – Ken Simpson, 76, ornithologist and writer (Field Guide to the Birds of Australia)
- 11 July – Eilene Hannan, 67, opera singer
- 12 July – Ken Goodwin, 79, academic and author.
- 13 July – Geoffrey Blackburn, 99, Baptist minister
- 14 July – Gavin Jones, 47, media executive, founder of the Deadly Awards
- 17 July –
  - Liam Davison, 56, author
  - John Walton, 62, actor
- 23 July – Frank Vaughan, 95, Catholic priest and rugby league player (Eastern Suburbs)
- 25 July – Richard Larter, 85, pop artist
- 27 July – Peter Miller, 53, software engineer (Aegis)
- 28 July – Johnny Rebb, 75, rock and roll singer
- 30 July – Martin Copley, 74, conservationist (Australian Wildlife Conservancy)

=== August ===
- 1 August – Michael Johns, 35, singer-songwriter (American Idol)
- 2 August – Brian Buckley, 78, VFL football player (Carlton)
- 3 August – Edward Clancy, 90, Roman Catholic bishop, Archbishop of Sydney (1983–2001)
- 6 August – Macarthur Job, 88, aviation writer and air safety consultant
- 8 August –
  - Edmund John Patrick Collins, 83, Roman Catholic prelate, Bishop of Darwin (1986–2007)
  - Peter Sculthorpe, 85, composer
- 9 August – Jerome Ehlers, 55, actor
- 11 August – Pierre Ryckmans, 78, diplomat, Australian sinologist and author (Chinese Shadows)
- 14 August – Jennifer Margaret Le Cussan, 55, botanist, teacher, conservationist
- 17 August – Marie Little, 81, sport administrator
- 18 August – Doug Williams, 91, VFL football player (Carlton)
- 22 August – Jack Harris, 91, golfer
- 23 August – Jack Edwards, 83, VFL football player (North Melbourne).
- 25 August – Jason Curley, 42, bassist (Tumbleweed)
- 28 August – Bill Kerr, 92, actor
- 30 August – Doone Kennedy, 87, politician, first female Lord Mayor of Hobart (1986–1996)

=== September ===
- 2 September – Jack Culpin, 86, politician, member of the Victorian Legislative Assembly for Glenroy (1976–1985) and Broadmeadows (1985–1988).
- 4 September – Ron Mulock, 84, politician, Deputy Premier of New South Wales (1984–1988)
- 5 September – Kerrie Biddell, 67, jazz and session singer
- 6 September –
  - Peter F. B. Alsop, engineer and historian
  - Martin Harrison, 65, poet
  - A. W. Pryor, 86, physicist
- 7 September – Harry Evans, 68, public servant, Clerk of the Australian Senate (1988–2009)
- 12 September – Antony Kidman, 75, psychologist, biochemist and author (died in Singapore)
- 15 September – Jeremy Ball, 45, politician and actor
- 17 September –
  - Elaine Lee, 74, actress (Number 96)
  - Sir Charles Read, 95, air force officer, RAAF Air Marshal during World War II
  - Lorna Thomas, 96, Australian cricket player and manager
- 23 September – Rodney Milgate, 80, painter, playwright and newsreader
- 24 September – Greg Mackey, 52, rugby league player (Warrington)
- 25 September – Cedric Wyatt, 74, public servant, political candidate, indigenous advocate
- 26 September – Tony McMichael, 71, epidemiologist

=== October ===
- 2 October – Robert Flower, 59, Australian rules footballer (Melbourne)
- 8 October –
  - Morris Lurie, 75, writer
- 10 October –
  - Geoff Miller, 72, public servant.
  - Ed Nimmervoll, 67, music journalist and author
- 11 October – Bob Such, 70, politician, member of the South Australian House of Assembly for Fisher (since 1989).
- 12 October – Maurie Keane, 91, politician, member of the New South Wales Legislative Assembly for Woronora (1973–1988).
- 14 October –
  - Mary Downer, 89, arts patron (died in London)
  - John F. Stephenson, 77, football player (Carlton)
- 15 October –
  - Sir James Balderstone, 93, businessman and company director
  - James Semple Kerr, 82, architectural historian
- 18 October –
  - Rachel Makinson, 97, research scientist.
  - Bruce Phillips, 85, Australian rules footballer (St Kilda)
- 19 October – Ken Short, 87, Anglican bishop
- 20 October – David Malcolm, 76, Chief Justice of Western Australia (1988–2006)
- 21 October –
  - Peter Trotter, 58, Paralympic wheelchair racer
  - Gough Whitlam, 98, Prime Minister (1972–1975)
- 24 October – Mike Dorsey, 84, actor (Number 96).
- 26 October – Brian Moore, 70, rugby league player and coach
- 27 October – William Orchard, 84, Australian water polo player and psychiatrist.
- 30 October –
  - Harcourt Dowsley, 95, cricket and football player.
  - Ida Elizabeth Osbourne, 98, radio broadcaster, founder of the ABC's Argonauts Club.
- 31 October – Sir Henry Harris, 89, cell biologist.

=== November ===
- 2 November – Jackie Fairweather, 46, triathlete and long-distance runner
- 4 November –
  - Admire Rakti, 6, racehorse
  - Araldo, 6, racehorse
- 7 November – Alex Way, 89, Australian rules footballer (Carlton)
- 8 November – Michael Leighton, 60, Victorian politician
- 10 November –
  - Steve Dodd, 86, actor
  - Wayne Goss, 63, Premier of Queensland (1989–1996)
- 15 November – Reg Withers, 90, Senator for Western Australia, Lord Mayor of Perth
- 16 November – Ian Craig, 79, Test cricketer
- 19 November – Jeremiah Coffey, 81, Bishop of Sale (1989–2008).
- 20 November – John Bartram, 89, Olympic runner (1948)
- 21 November – Heather Southcott, 86, politician.
- 27 November –
  - Phillip Hughes, 25, Test cricketer
  - Meta Truscott, 97, diarist and historian.
- 30 November – Phil May, 70, Australian athlete.

=== December ===
- 1 December – Rocky Wood, 55, writer
- 2 December –
  - Maurice Saxby, 89, academic and author
  - Jeff Truman, 57, screenwriter and actor
- 4 December –
  - Graeme Goodall, 82, recording engineer and record label owner, co-founder of Island Records
  - Lynne Kosky, 56, Victorian politician, MLA for Altona (1996–2010)
- 6 December – Stella Young, 32, comedian and disability advocate
- 9 December – Frank Farrington, 88, rugby league player and administrator (Newtown Jets)
- 11 December – Patricia Gallaher, 77, librarian.
- 15 December –
  - Donald Metcalf, 85, medical researcher
  - Arthur Whyte, 93, politician, President of the South Australian Legislative Council (1978–1985).

== See also ==
- 2014 in Australian literature
- 2014 in Australian television
- List of Australian films of 2014
