= 2015 Australian human powered vehicle season =

The 2015 Australian human powered vehicle season began on the 28 February with the first round of the Victorian HPV Series at Casey Fields and concludes with the RACV Energy Breakthrough series at Maryborough, Victoria.

Australia is the world leader in Human powered vehicle (Velomobile) racing.

== Season calendar ==
Race	Competition	State	Date	Duration	Entries	Outright HPV Winner
Casey Fields	Victorian HPV Series	(Victoria (state)) Victoria	28 February	6 hours	68	Platt Racing
Wonthaggi	Victorian HPV Series	(Victoria (state)) Victoria	20–22 March	24 hours		Platt Racing
Loxton	Australian HPV Super Series	South Australia	2–3 May	6 hours	82	EDEC Trisled
Victoria Park	Australian HPV Super Series	South Australia	13–14 June	6 hours		
Victoria Park	Australian HPV Super Series	South Australia	25–26 June	6 hours		
Busselton	Australian HPV Super Series	Western Australia	8–9 August	6 hours		
Bendigo	Victorian HPV Series	(Victoria (state)) Victoria	22 August	10 hours		
Maryborough	RACQ Energy Breakthrough	Queensland	12–13 September	24 hours		
Murray Bridge	Australian HPV Super Series	South Australia	19–20 September	24 hours		
Casey Fields	Victorian HPV Series	(Victoria (state)) Victoria	10 October	6 hours		
Maryborough	RACV Energy Breakthrough	(Victoria (state)) Victoria	19–22 November	24 hours		

== Season review ==
After dominating the first two races of the 2015 season Platt Racing amicably disbanded. Some riders are continuing on in other teams whilst others have retired.
