= 2014 Australian human powered vehicle season =

The 2014 Australian human powered vehicle season began on the 28 February with the first round of the Victorian HPV Series at Casey Fields and concludes with the RACV Energy Breakthrough series at Maryborough, Victoria.

Australia is the world leader in Human powered vehicle (Velomobile) racing.

== Season Calendar ==
Race	Competition	State	Date	Duration	Entries	Outright HPV Winner
Casey Fields	Victorian HPV Series	(Victoria (state)) Victoria	22 February	6 hours	65	Platt Racing
Derwent	Tasmanian Energy Challenge	Tasmania	2 March	6 hours	8	EDEC HPV Racing Team
Wonthaggi	Victorian HPV Series	(Victoria (state)) Victoria	22–23 March	24 hours	91	Tru Blu Racing
Knox	BridgeBuilders HPV Challenge	(Victoria (state)) Victoria	27 April	6 hours	50	Trisled
Loxton	Australian HPV Super Series	South Australia	2–3 May	6 hours	63	Trisled
Victoria Park	Australian HPV Super Series	South Australia	13–14 June	6 hours	183	Platt Racing
Victoria Park	Australian HPV Super Series	South Australia	25–26 June	6 hours	181	Platt Racing
Busselton	Australian HPV Super Series	Western Australia	8–9 August	6 hours	36	EDEC HPV Racing Team
Bendigo	Victorian HPV Series	(Victoria (state)) Victoria	22 August	10 hours		Wattle Racing
Maryborough	RACQ Energy Breakthrough	Queensland	12–13 September	24 hours	123	St Mary's College
Murray Bridge	Australian HPV Super Series	South Australia	19–20 September	24 hours	216	Platt Racing
Casey Fields	Victorian HPV Series	(Victoria (state)) Victoria	10 October	6 hours	96	Platt Racing
Maryborough	RACV Energy Breakthrough	(Victoria (state)) Victoria	19–22 November	24 hours		Bendigo Senior Secondary College
