= Frank Vaughan =

Frank Vaughan is the name of:

- Frankie Vaughan (1928–1999), British singer
- Frank Vaughn (1902–1959), US soccer player
- Frank Vaughan (rugby league) (1918–2014), National Rugby League player
