= Green Point Foreshore and Structures =

Green Point Foreshore Land and Structures
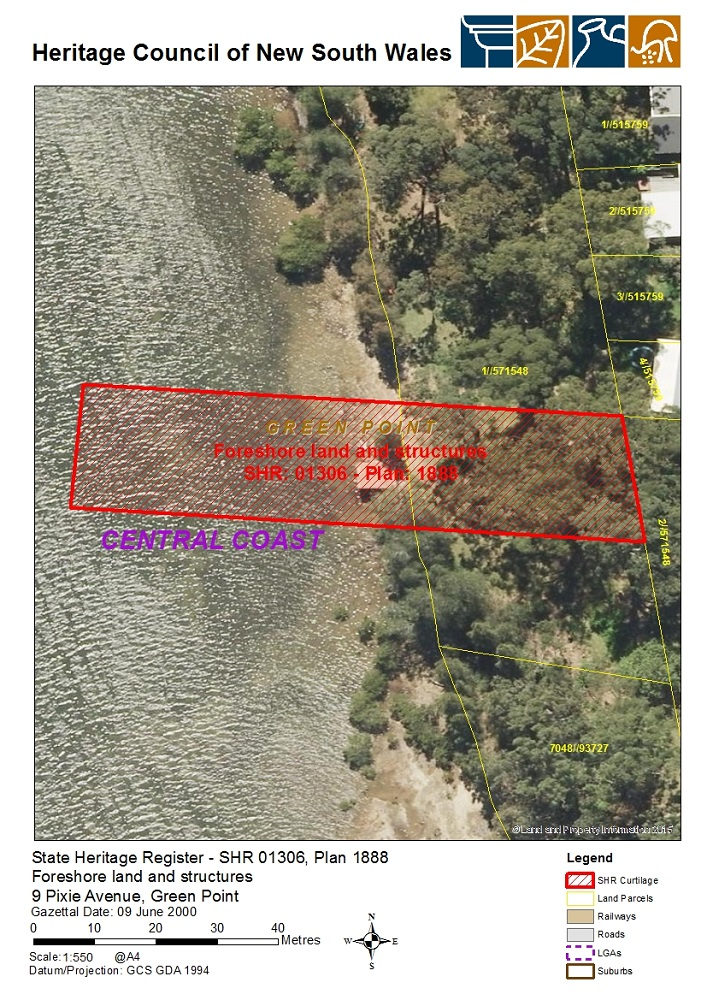
- Heritage boundaries

- Location within New South Wales Location within Australia
- 33.4631°S 151.3563°E
- Location: 9 Pixie Avenue, Green Point, Central Coast, New South Wales, Australia

Site notes
- Owner: Department of Planning and Infrastructure

New South Wales Heritage Register
- Official name: Foreshore land and structures; Jetty; boatshed; well and foreshore land associated with Mulholland's Farm
- Type: state heritage (built)
- Designated: 9 June 2000
- Reference no.: 1306
- Type: Other - Residential Buildings (private)
- Category: Residential buildings (private)

Green Point Foreshore and Structures is a heritage-listed conservation site at 9 Pixie Avenue, Green Point, Central Coast, New South Wales, Australia. It includes the jetty, boatshed, well, and all foreshore land associated with Mulholland's Farm. It was added to the New South Wales State Heritage Register on 9 June 2000.

== History ==
In October 1881, Carl Ludwig Sahl and John Nobbs purchased a 640-acre land grant in the vicinity of modern-day Green Point, and subdivided it as the Green Point Estate. They retained some of the land, however, including a waterfront section (Lot 1) in the south-west corner of the original grant, and amounted to area of 3 acres 6 roods 1/2 perch. In October 1890, Sahl and Nobbs successfully lobbied the government for rescission of the usual 100' high-water mark reservation between some of their land and Brisbane Water, allowing them to purchase the foreshore land. It was sold to Charles Thomas Sandon in November 1891, to Eliza Sophia Winton in July 1892, and to local farmer Herbert Henry Thompson in 1907. Thompson already owned the adjacent property, and his combined holdings formed what was to become a successful farming operation. He then sold the combined land to George James Mulholland in May 1909.

Mulholland subsequently constructed a boat shed, wharf, well, road and water pipeline along the foreshore land, supporting both his farming interests on land and a successful oyster farming venture offshore.

Mulholland's Farm was subdivided in 1961, and in 1975, the high-water reservation of 100' depth was resumed by Gosford City Council and dedicated, together with other areas on Brisbane Water, as a public reserve. This reduced the land area associated with the house to 3154m2, and divorced the wharf and boatshed from the same land title as the house. A sign on the wharf stating "oyster lease" remained on the wharf until the 1980s.

== Description ==
The boatshed is a simple timber framed and weatherboard structure, with a skillion form roof. Located adjacent to the shed are the hardwood planks of the former wharf structure. The concrete piles of the wharf survive. Both of these items appear to be pre-World War II constructions as they appear in the aerial photograph of 1941.

The boat shed has doors to its land and watersides, indicating is use for boats. In it there is a filer pump which is part of an integral irrigation system comprising well (at the foreshore) pipe to the holding tank, and a distribution pump under the house (electric billabong) of pre-World War II vintage.

== Heritage listing ==
The jetty, boatshed, well and foreshore land was owned and managed as an integral part of Mulholland's Farm between 1891 and 1975. The boatshed and remnants of the hardwood framed jetty are a tangible association between the house and the use of brisbane Water as a means of either transport, and/or an economic activity such as oyster farming. Furthermore, its significance as the most intact surviving farm on the Brisbane Water (from the farm subdivision era of the 1880s to 1945) derives from the fact that it retains the physical and visual evidence of Mulholland's Farm's association with the waterway.

Green Point Foreshore and Structures was listed on the New South Wales State Heritage Register on 9 June 2000.
