= William Orchard =

William Orchard may refer to:

- W. Arundel Orchard (William Arundel Orchard, 1867–1961), British-born Australian organist, composer and music educator
- William E. Orchard (1877–1955), British preacher
- Billy Orchard (1888–1965), Australian rules footballer
- William Orchard (architect) (died 1504), English gothic architect
- William Orchard (water polo) (1929–2014), Australian water polo player
