= UltraCommuter =

Hybrid electric concept car

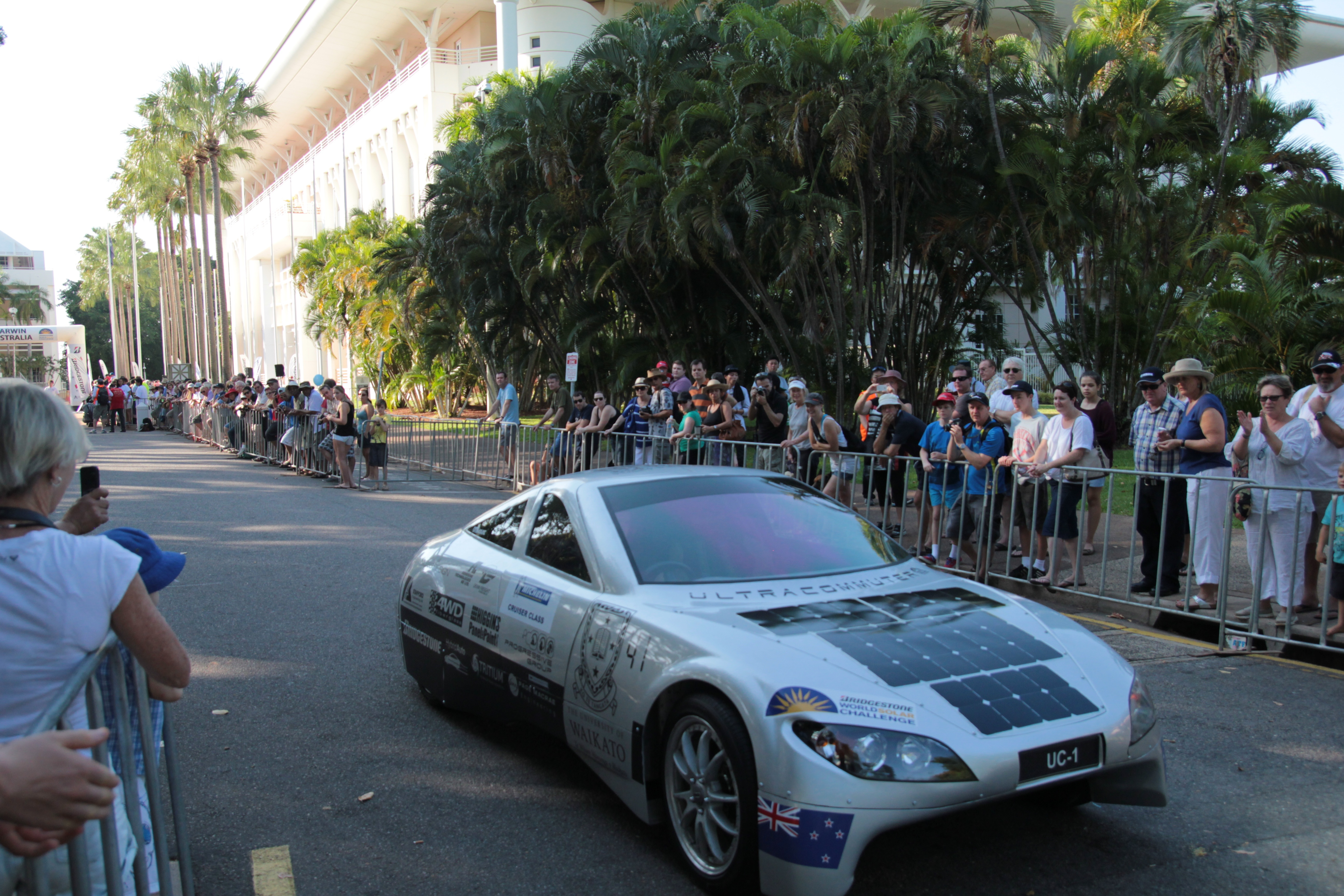
UltraCommuter in Darwin in 2013

The UltraCommuter was a hybrid electric concept car first designed by the University of Queensland Sustainable Energy Group and unveiled in 2005. In 2007, the project was transferred to the Waikato University School of Engineering and further developed in conjunction with HybridAuto Pty.

== Design and development ==
The UltaCommuter project commenced in 2000 out of the University of Queensland's award-winning solar car project, the SunShark. Dr Geoff Walker said the aim was to make a car that people could register and drive from the knowledge gained making the SunShark. The car body toured Queensland in 2005 and 2006 as part of RACQ's roadshow on the history of Queensland motoring called Bulldust to Bitumen and Beyond. In 2007, Matthew Greaves, Ben Guymer, and Bernie Walsh who started the UltraCommuter project formed HybridAuto and passed development on to Waikato University School of Engineering team lead, Mike Duke.

The UltraCommuter was described as a long range two seater electric vehicle. It ran on either a single 150 kg lithium battery pack which gave it a range of about 200 km. With two battery packs installed the range is doubled to 400 km. The car could attain speeds of between 120 kmh and 170 kmh. The cars aluminium honeycomb chassis was about one third the weight of a similar sized production car, and two engines are situated in the rear wheels.

HybridAuto (now Ultramotive Technologies) and Page MacRae, a Mount Maunganui engineering firm, funded the initial development cost of about NZ$150,000, with the intention of making it road legal as a research tool for investigating introducing battery electric cars into New Zealand. Ultramotive provided the electric motors. In 2007 Dr Duke of Waikato University stated that it would take at least 18 months and cost at least $10 million to market and produce between 100 and 2000 electric cars a year.

=== BEV ===
Development work continued at Waikato University with another solar-powered car, the single seat battery electric vehicle (BEV), being certified as roadworthy in 2011. This second car was driven from Auckland to Bluff between 24 November and 6 December 2011. They were joined on the journey by Bochum University's SolarWorld GT, which was on a round the world journey.

=== Refurbished UltraCommuter ===
In 2012, Waikato University engineering lecturer, Dr Mike Duke, announced that the University was planning to refurbish the UltraCommuter for entry into the Evolution Class of the 2013 World Solar Challenge. The car was completed and entered in the 2013 challenge. A magnet adhesion failure and stator alignment issues with the wheel motors forced the car's withdrawal.

In 2014, a fresh project to redesign, build, and test replacement motors under Mike Duke's supervision was offered to final year mechanical engineering students. The project was limited to four students.

== Production ==
Discussions were held in 2008 between the Waikato University electric vehicle project and British car makers with the view to establishing a Britain, Australia and New Zealand consortium that may manufacture electric vehicles in New Zealand but these did not proceed.

== World Solar Challenge ==
=== 2007 ===
The UltraCommuter was raced in the Greenfleet Technology Class of the Darwin to Adelaide 2007 World Solar Challenge by a Hybrid Auto and Waikato University Team. The Greenfleet Class of cars in the Challenge aimed to promote more consumer oriented low emission vehicles.

=== 2013 ===
Waikato University entered a refurbished version of the UltraCommuter in the 2013 Challenge. A day or so prior to the commencement of the race, during testing, a magnet broke out of the cars right-hand motor forcing the team to run the car on one motor. Part way through the first raceday the left hand motor broke with six magnets breaking out making the car unrepairable within the allowed timeframe and prompting its withdrawal. Prior to this the car had performed better than expected and had a longer range than expected.

== See also ==
- Charging station
- Electric car
- Environmentalism
- Hybrid electric car
- Institution of Professional Engineers New Zealand - IPENZ

== Photographs ==
- 2007 Solar Challenge entry
- 2011 Battery electric vehicle (BEV)
- 2013 Solar Challenge entry

== Publication ==
- Thesis: Design of Lightweight Electric Vehicles, Travis de Fluiter, University of Waikato, Hamilton New Zealand, March 2008
