= Peter Miller (software engineer) =

Australian software developer

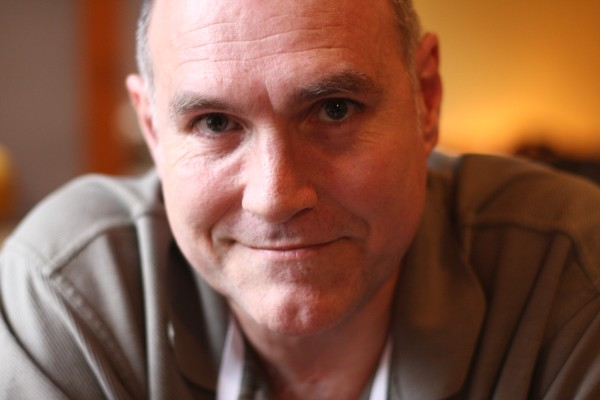
- Miller in October 2011
- Born: Peter Alexander Miller; 16 October 1960; Ramsgate, New South Wales
- Died: 27 July 2014 (aged 53); Green Point, New South Wales
- Occupation: Software Engineer
- Spouse: Mary Therese Miller (nee Lynch) (married 198?-2014)
- Children: Rowan Miller (1989-present)
- Parents: Ronald William Miller; Jane Penelope Miller (nee Phelam)

Peter Miller (16 October 1960 – 27 July 2014) was an Australian software developer who wrote Recursive Make Considered Harmful and created Aegis and cook. He also proposed a set of "laws" for modern software engineering and architecture in the early 1990s:

Miller's laws are:

1. The number of interactions within a development team is O(n!) without controlled access to the baseline. If the development team does have controlled access to the baseline, interactions can be reduced to near O(n), where n is the number of developers and/or files in the source tree, whichever is larger.
2. The baseline MUST always be in working order.
3. The software build/construction process can be reduced to a directed, acyclical graph (DAG).
4. It is necessary to build a rigid framework of selected components (aka the top level aegis design).
5. The framework should not do any real work, and should instead delegate everything to external components. The external components should be as interchangeable as possible.
6. The framework should use the Strategy pattern for most complex tasks.
