= Green Point Christian College =

Location
- 382 Avoca Drive, Green Point, Central Coast, New South Wales; Australia; 33°27′43″S 151°21′45″E

Information
- Type: Independent co-educational primary and secondary day school
- Motto: Equipped for Life
- Denomination: Non-denominational Christian
- Established: 1982; 44 years ago
- Educational authority: NSW Department of Education
- Principal: Joel van Bentum
- Staff: 150
- Enrolment: 1,095 (2022)
- Campus type: Suburban
- Affiliation: Christian Schools Australia
- Website: www.gpcc.nsw.edu.au

Green Point Christian College is an independent non-denominational Christian co-educational primary and secondary day school, located in Green Point, New South Wales on the Central Coast of New South Wales, Australia. The school provides a religious and general education to approximately 1,100 students from Kindergarten to Year 12.

== History ==
The school was established in 1982 by the Green Point Baptist Church. The principal is Mr Joel van Bentum.

== Notable students ==
- Daniel Webber – Actor
- Nicola McDermott – Olympic Athlete

== See also ==
- List of non-government schools in New South Wales
