= Mulholland's Farm =

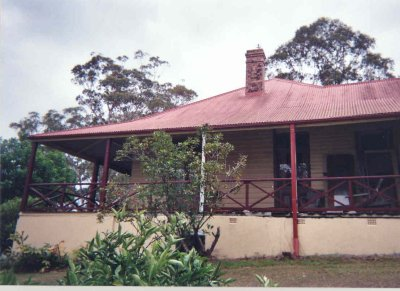

- Location within New South Wales Location within Australia
- 33.4632°S 151.3568°E
- Location: 9 Pixie Avenue, Green Point, Central Coast, New South Wales, Australia

History
- Built: 1907

New South Wales Heritage Register
- Official name: Mulholland's Farm
- Type: state heritage (built)
- Designated: 2 April 1999
- Reference no.: 289
- Type: Homestead building
- Category: Residential buildings (private)

Mulholland's Farm is a heritage-listed residence at 9 Pixie Avenue, Green Point, Central Coast, New South Wales, Australia. It was built in 1907. It was added to the New South Wales State Heritage Register on 2 April 1999.

== History ==
The property known as Mulholland's Farm is situated in an area of two Crown land grants made in the late 1830s. The history of the land tenure is therefore complex, but does provide clear evidence for the forming of Mulholland's farm.

=== Henry Smyth's 640 acres ===
The first and larger of these is the 640 acres (Portion 174 of the Parish of Kincumber) granted to Major Henry Smyth on 13 September 1839. Smyth was a former commandant of the penal colony of Port Macquarie. Smyth's grant had a substantial water frontage to Brisbane Water on its western boundary.

Traversing Smyth's grant was the main public road between Gosford and Kincumber. This parish road (established at the request and maintenance of the inhabitants of the district) was surveyed in 1858.

Smyth retained ownership of the grant until July 1847 when it was sold to Herbert Solway. Solway's ownership was relatively short; selling the property in October 1852 to John Stirling. Stirling mortgaged the property and in defaulting on his repayments the property was sold by his mortgagor, W. D. Nunn, to Richard Albert Watson in January 1881. Watson sold the property to Carl Ludwig Sahl and John Nobbs in October 1881.

==== Green Point Estate ====
Smyth's grant (and an additional area of 50 acres to the north granted to John Roby Hatfield) was subdivided by Carl Ludwig Sahl and John Nobbs in 1882 to form 67 allotments known as the "Green Point Estate". John Nobbs (1845-1921) was the son of a noted early colonial gardener. Nobbs' background was as a conveyancer building up a lucrative practice in the Parramatta region, becoming the first mayor of the newly incorporated council of Granville in 1885. He was the founder and president of the Fruitgrowers' Union of New South Wales.

The estate, surveyed and laid out by Dawson and Stephen, licensed surveyors, of 139 Pitt Street, Sydney, offered a range of allotments varying in size from 2 to 32 acres. All allotments had access to a reserved road of 100' width. A government wharf reserve was also established (adjacent Lot 6 of the estate) together with associated road access (now known as Lexington Parade). The reservation of all land within 100' of the high-water mark of Brisbane Water (probably established at the issue of the original Crown grants), was retained by the Crown.

The estate was offered for sale on 20 June 1882 in the rooms of auctioneers Batt Rodd & Purves, 88 Pitt Street, Sydney. The auctioneer's description of the estate was as follows:

Gosford, Brisbane Water

The Auctioneers confidently recommend this Estate to Gentlemen in search of Blocks for Waterside Country Residences. The Scenery is simply magnificent, and the nicely wooded hills, sloping gently down to the placid Lake-like Broadwater of Gosford, afford unrivalled sites for Building purposes.

To those seeking Sporting Retreats no better opportunity can offer, Fish and Game abundant.

The Green Point Estate, in an area over 1,000 acres, has been subdivided by Messrs, Dawson & Stephen in their usual masterly style into large Blocks (not allotments) of from 2 to 32 aces each, as per plan herein. Situate in the heart of the growing and fast improving district of Brisbane Water (called with good reason the Rhine of New South Wales), the inducements to buy are tempting. That the soil is rich is proved by the fact that magnificent Tree ferns, Longalous Cabbage Trees, and every variety of Mountain Bush Timber grow on the Estate in the utmost profusion, while the land is splendidly timbered. As soon as the Great Northern Railway between Sydney and Newcastle is finished, the value of this Property will enormously enhanced. Steamers ply to and from Sydney daily, doing the trip in little more than Three Hours.

Water frontage lots, eminently adapted for gentlemen with leisure time in search of healthful recreation. The Waters abound with Fish and the Woods teem with Game.

Farm lots. The soil being rich, loamy, and well watered, Timber getters will find Forests of Magnificent Trees admittedly suited for the requirements of the market, either for Railway Sleepers or Sawn Planks."

Terms offered were 10% to be payable in 3 months with the balance payable in equal instalments at 9, 12, 15, 18, and 21 months from the day of sale at 6% interest.

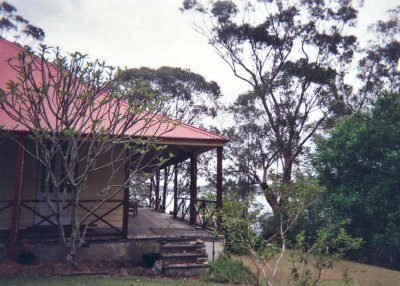
Looking north-west toward Brisbane Water

Mulholland's farm house is located on Lot 1 (area of 3 acres 6 roods 1/2 perch) located at the south-west corner of the Smyth's grant. Lot 1 had a water frontage to Brisbane Water, set back by the foreshore reservation of 100', and was bounded by reserved roads on the north (now Elfin Hill Road) and east. While some lots were sold at the time of the auction in 1882, Lot 1 was purchased from Sahl and Nobbs in November 1891 by Charles Thomas Sandon and William Hume for £96/8/11. Sandon later in the same month brought out Hume's interest and at the same time purchased the 100' reservation of land which separated Lot 1 from Brisbane Water. This area had been granted by purchase to Sahl and Nobbs in October 1890 after lobbying the government for rescission of the usual 100' high-water mark reservation. That reservation land became a functional part of the subsequent farm, and the boat shed, wharf, well, road and water pipeline were built on it.

Sandon was a resident of Sydney, and a stationer by profession. The purchase was probably a speculative venture for in July, 1892, the property was sold to Eliza Sophia Winton, a widow residing in North Sydney, for £150.20.

Winton's ownership again appears to have been primarily as an investment, although in this instance the wisdom of her action may be open to question given that she sold the allotment for only £50 in 1907 to Herbert Henry Thompson, a farmer, who was probably residing on the adjacent property to the south.

=== Henry Linden's 60 acres ===
The other Crown land grant was made to Henry Linden on 17 June 1840. Linden was a Sydney publican operating in the 1840s the Woolpack Inn in Sussex Street. This grant (Portion 75 of the Parish of Kincumber) comprised an area of 60 acres located to the south of Smyth's 640 acres. Linden's grant also had a water frontage, and included a frontage to the mouth of Egan Creek. An early name for Linden's grant was 'Linden's Flat'.

Linden retained ownership of the grant throughout his life; it eventually being sold by his trustees in August 1878 to Francis McDonald, a Sydney grocer.

A substantial portion (53a 3r Op) of Linden's 60 acre grant was retained until the late 1880s by Francis McDonald. McDonald' s interest or use of this property, if any, is not known to the authors. McDonald was a victim of the financial downturn of the 1890s, and in 1897 his real and personal estate was sequestrated.22 In July, 1900, McDonald's property at Green Point was sold by the official assignee, Lancelot Hadfield Lloyd, to Rosa Ellen Jane Mobbs, the wife of the Parramatta auctioneer George Henry Mobbs. Mobbs subsequently subdivided the 53 acres, with one allotment of 16 acres, bounded on the west by Brisbane Water, on the east by Egan Creek and on the north by the Green Point Estate, being purchased by Herbert Henry Thompson in December 1902.

=== Thompson's ownership 1902-1909 ===
Herbert Henry Thompson was described in the aforementioned title deed of 1902 as a farmer of Green Point. The 1903 edition of the Commonwealth Electoral Roll listed Thompson (born 1873 at Parramatta) as a resident of Green Point and an orchardist by profession. He lived with his wife Louisa (née Phillips, married 1897 at Granville), but there were no children. The location of Thompson's residence within the 16 acres of Linden's grant during this period is not known to the authors.

Thompson subsequently purchased in 1907 Lot 1 of the Green Point Estate. In so doing he created the parcel of land which became Mulholland's farm. In fact the existing farm house was built straddling both allotments, and so must date from after 1907. Both of these properties were consequently mortgaged to Mary Amelia Davies. Davies was probably from the prominent Gosford family which had settled in the area in the early 1830s, and had undertaken shipbuilding on Brisbane Water for a number of years. In May 1909 Thompson sold both properties to George James Mulholland.

=== Mulholland's Farm 1909-1958 ===
It is presently unclear as to whether Thompson constructed the farmhouse in the years 1907 to 1909 (from which time the two properties were under the same ownership) or if it was Mulholland. In the land title deed of May 1909 George J. Mulholland was described as being a resident of Woy Woy, but by the time of the Commonwealth Electoral Roll of 1909 (month of issue unfortunately not recorded) he was residing at Green Point with his (second) wife Cassie (or Cassy) Wilson. At the time of the 1909 purchase Mulholland was a relative newcomer to the Gosford area having come to the area from Wagga Wagga. In Wagga Wagga he had married Mary Macentyre in 1876 and the couple had the following children: William Thomas R (b. 1877), Cecilia Jane (b. 1879), John A. (b.1881), Mary A. (born 1887), and George J.V. (born 1884).

The MacEntyre family were quite prominent in the development of the Wagga Wagga region as the wheat growing area it is today. William Macentyre, Mary's father, was an Irish emigrant who settled in Wagga Wagga in the mid 1850s. He and his sons were considered to have been industrious, progressive and successful farmers. During the 1870s William was also a justice of the peace and member of the local hospital committee, a director of the Wagga Wagga Sugar Co., and prominent in the Free Selectors' Association. The Mulholland family, who were also Irish emigrants, were from the same wheat growing area of Wagga Wagga as the Macentyres.

George J. Mulholland's first wife died in Wagga Wagga in March 1906, and in the following year he remarried in Sydney to Cassie Wilson Boyle. Mulholland's stay at Green Point, however, was short-lived, as he died in December 1912. His widow, however, continued to reside at and farm the property until her death in 1952.

By 1941 the farm consisted of house, cleared paddocks, wharf and shed, an irrigation system for orcharding (the feeder pipe, pump and holding tank for which survive) and a trolley track for loading produce (only fragments survive).

In 1948 an oyster farm lease was issued under the Fisheries and Oyster Farms Act 1935. This is likely to have been a renewal. This legislation was administered by the Office of the Chief Secretary who was charged with protecting, developing and regulating the fisheries of the State within territorial waters. The lease was initially issued to Cassie Mulholland, but continually renewed through to 1964 and possibly later, by successive owners of the property. Oysters had been cultivated in the region for a considerable number of years. The Erina Shire Holiday and Touring Guide of 1928 noted that Brisbane Water was very prominent in this regard, with a well known reputation and steady sales of large volumes. A sign saying oyster lease survived on the wharf up to the 1980s (Hazelton).

In July 1958 the properties (for they remained under different titles) were transferred to the benefactor under the will of Casey Wilson Mulholland, the Australasian Conference Association Ltd., which promptly disposed of the properties by sale in August 1958 to Gerald Robert and Lillian Bruce of Leura. Gerald was described in the land title deed as a Torres Strait Pilot. The Bruces appear not to have resided at the farm on a full-time basis, and may have used the premises as a weekender.

=== 1960s Suburban Subdivision ===
In 1961 the Bruces subdivided and sold off a substantial part of the farm, reducing the area of the house to 1 acre 2 roods 10 3/4 perches which included the water frontage to Brisbane Water. A new reserved road, Pixie Avenue, was established as part of this subdivision.

Shortly after the subdivision the property was sold to Ellen Jones in March, 1963. Jones retained ownership of the property until 1988 at which time it was sold to the current owners, Judith Ellen and John Ross Hazelton. Again it is not clear if Jones, at least initially, resided at the house on a full-time basis, or if the premises were used as a weekender. From this time the property was no longer farmed, and garden shrubs were planted in the cleared area. By 1970 the house was in a decayed state, and its internal linings and many doors were replaced as part of a major renovation.

In the interim (1975) the high-water reservation of 100' depth was resumed by Gosford City Council and dedicated, together with other areas on Brisbane Water, as a public reserve. This reduced the land area associated with the house to 3154m2, and divorced the wharf and boatshed from the same land title as the house.

This reduced area was placed under a Permanent Conservation Order in March 1984 under section 36 of the Heritage Act, 1977.

== Description ==
The dwelling house is a single storey timber framed and weatherboard clad structure. The roof is a gable form clad in colorbond corrugated sheeting. The roof extends over an open verandah on the north, west and south elevations. There are two brick chimneys. At the rear of the house is an attached bathroom and kitchen wing. The verandah has a timber balustrade. The planning of the interior of the house comprises a wide central corridor flanked by the main living and sleeping rooms, with the aforementioned bathroom and kitchen wing located in the south-east corner. A motor vehicle garage is attached to this wing on the north side. At the front of the house is a concrete holding tank for water. This was used as part of an irrigation system.

The sloping ground surrounding the house is mostly cleared of vegetation with plantings being mainly located along the boundary to Pixie Avenue and to the north of the house. Built within the grounds includes a water tank, Hills hoist, bird bath, septic tank and concrete entrance drive. None of these features are older than about thirty years.

Landscaping in the form of plantings include Araucaria, Cedar, Citrus, Conifers, Cotoneaster, Elm, Eucalyptus, Frangipani, Hibiscus, Jacaranda, Loquat, Macadamia, Maple, Oleander and Privet the majority of which were planted in the 1960s.

== Heritage listing ==
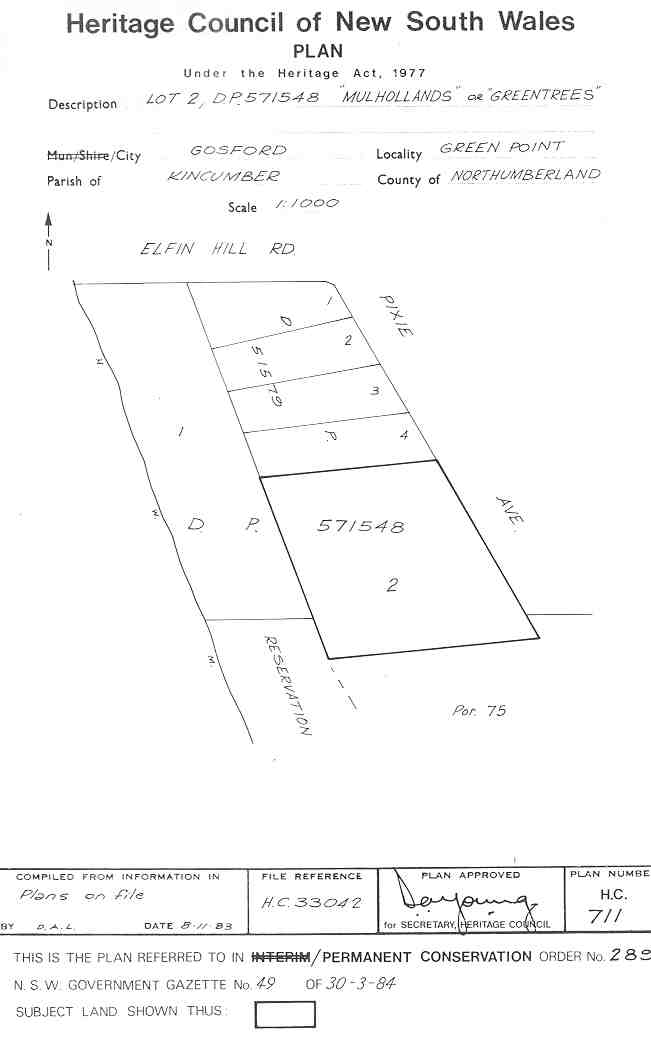
Heritage boundaries

Mulholland's Farm is the most intact surviving farm on Brisbane Water from the farm subdivision era of the 1880s to 1945. It includes a house (built c. 1907), wharf and boatshed, and possibly well, related to its farm use, and uniquely retains its historic setting on the foreshore of Brisbane Water.

Mulholland's Farm was listed on the New South Wales State Heritage Register on 2 April 1999 having satisfied the following criteria.

The place is important in demonstrating the course, or pattern, of cultural or natural history in New South Wales.

The former farm, albeit subdivided, with its house and foreshore farm structures, is one of a small number of farms established from subdivisions of the 1880s to survive in the local area. In this instance it is Green Point Estate subdivision of 1885. The Place appears to retain, more than any other on Brisbane Water, its full visual setting and physical relationship with the water, farm structures, and a meaningful rural setting with key historic elements. The farm is one of a number of former farming properties in the local area associated with a pioneering family. In this instance it is the Mulholland family who owned the property from 1907 through to 1958. The house is one of two comparable examples identified in the Central Coast Heritage Study as an early farm residence associated with a coastal setting and wharf structure (the other is at Riley's Bay).

The place is important in demonstrating aesthetic characteristics and/or a high degree of creative or technical achievement in New South Wales.

The house is a good example of a large but very simple early twentieth century rural house. Its verandahed form and construction entirely conform to the tradition of rural house construction for the period such as in the use of weatherboard sheeting, gable form roof, and brick chimneys. The planning of the house is distinctive for its wide living hall, a particularly favoured feature of the Edwardian period. It is also well sited on a natural promontory. The place is probably unique for its age in the local area for the combination of its setting on the foreshore of Brisbane Water, age of construction, and integrity of fabric, external form and planning.

The place has strong or special association with a particular community or cultural group in New South Wales for social, cultural or spiritual reasons.

The house is one of a small number of former semi-rural residences that have been identified by the local community and council as being significant in illustrating the history of the Gosford/Wyong area. The place is one of a small number of properties in the local area which have been accorded a Permanent Conservation Order [now SHR-listing] by the NSW Heritage Council, and therefore recognised as being of State significance to the community of New South Wales.

The place has potential to yield information that will contribute to an understanding of the cultural or natural history of New South Wales.

The built fabric of the house and jetty/boatshed area may, upon archaeological investigation, reveal details about the former uses of the farm, which are not otherwise available through the historical record. In particular, substantial evidence of the irrigation system for the orchard and house is a source of information about farm technology.

The place possesses uncommon, rare or endangered aspects of the cultural or natural history of New South Wales.

The interior of the house including the verandahs, but excluding the garage; the setting of the house on the foreshore of Brisbane Water and orientation of the principal front elevation to the foreshore and jetty; and the boatshed and remnants of the former hardwood framed jetty which are a tangible association between the house and the use of Brisbane Water as a means of either transport, and/or economic activity such as oyster farming.
