= Harry Rowe (footballer) =

Australian rules footballer and umpire

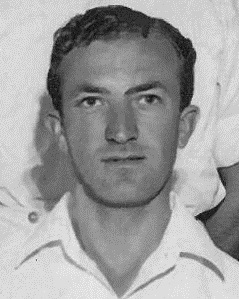

Personal information
- Full name: Henry Gordon Rowe
- Born: 2 February 1925; St.Kilda, Victoria
- Died: 1 April 2014 (aged 89); Melbourne, Victoria
- Original team: MHS Old Boys
- Height: 183 cm (6 ft 0 in)
- Weight: 80 kg (176 lb)

Playing career^{1}
| Years | Club | Games (Goals) | |
| 1945–1946 | Melbourne | 2 (0) | |

Umpiring career
| Years | League | Role | Games |
| 1951–1955 | VFL | Field umpire | 16 |
- ^{1} Playing statistics correct to the end of 1946.

Henry Gordon "Harry" Rowe (2 February 1925 – 1 April 2014) was an Australian rules footballer who played for Melbourne and umpired in the Victorian Football League (VFL).

A VAFA premiership player with Melbourne High School, Rowe played twice at the Melbourne Football Club over two separate seasons.

In 1948 Rowe took up field umpiring with the VFL Second Eighteens (later VFL Reserve Grade) and the following season he was promoted to the VFL senior list. He umpired his first VFL Second Eighteens match in 1950 and in 1951 he was appointed to his first VFL senior match – South Melbourne versus Essendon at the Lake Oval. At the conclusion of this match the crowd hurled various missiles at Rowe but none struck him.

Rowe umpired the 1955 Fitzroy versus Geelong match in which Fitzroy forward Tony Ongarello scored two goals from place-kicks. These remain the last two goals to be scored in such a fashion in the VFL/AFL. It was Rowe's final VFL senior match.

Continuing to umpire until 1963, primarily in the country, his final career totals were 16 VFL, 27 VFL Second Eighteens, 244 VCFL, 25 Tasmanian and 3 Metropolitan Football League matches, including 48 finals over 15 seasons.

He was awarded life membership of the Victorian Football League Umpires' Association in 1959.

Through much of his time as a footballer and umpire Rowe also played for the Richmond Cricket Club and was selected for 81 First XI matches.

Rowe died in Melbourne on 1 April 2014.
