= Paula Gruden =

Slovenian-born Australian poet (1921–2014)

- Pavla Gruden
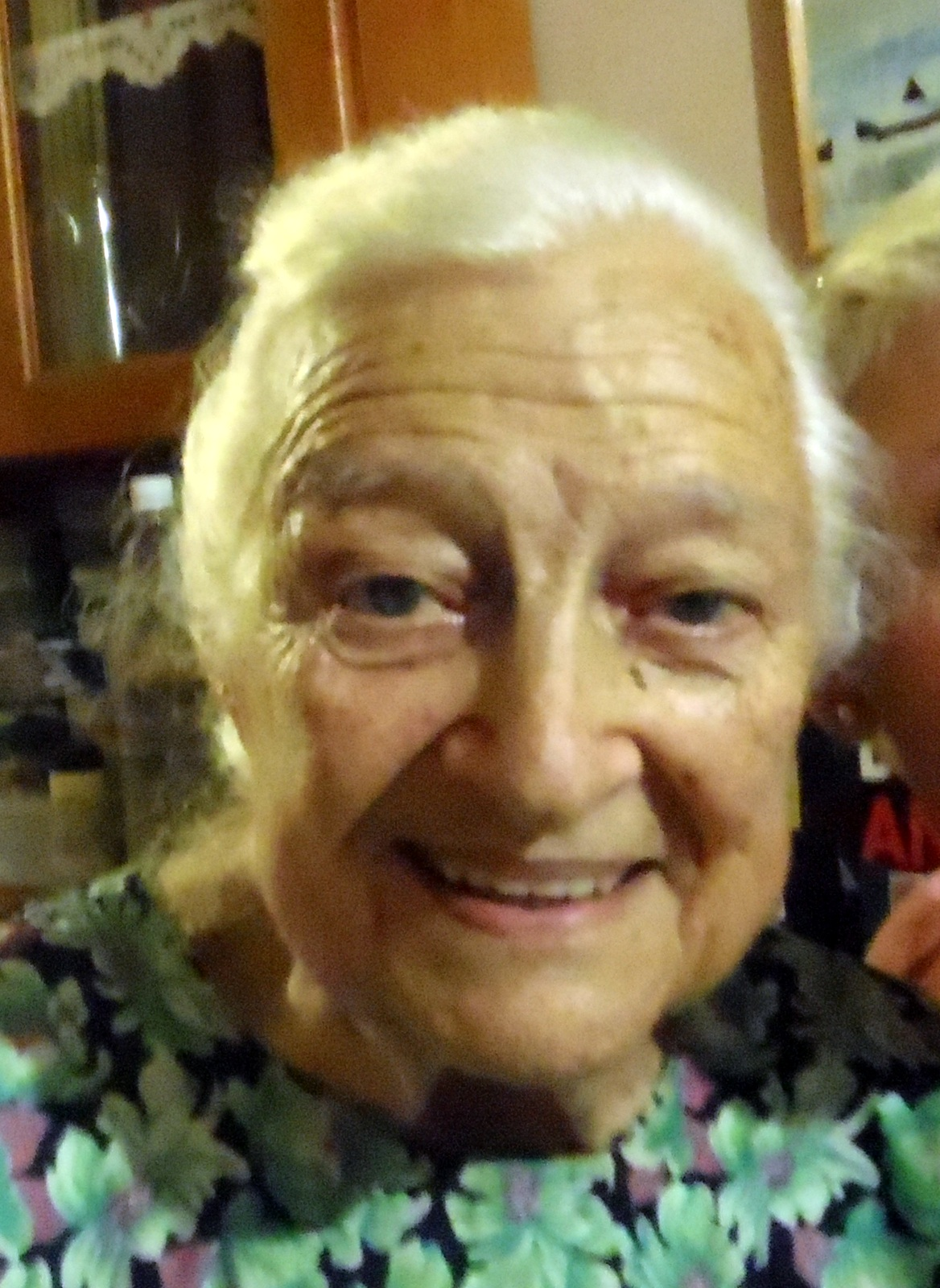
- Born: 14 February 1921; Ljubljana, Kingdom of Serbs, Croats, and Slovenes
- Died: 26 January 2014 (aged 92); Sydney, New South Wales, Australia
- Citizenship: Australian
- Occupation: Poet
- Writing career
- Language: English, Slovene
- Genre: Haiku

Paula Gruden or Pavla Gruden (14 February 1921 – 26 January 2014) was an Australian poet, translator, and editor of Slovene descent.

== Biography ==
Gruden was born in Ljubljana, at the time a town in the Kingdom of Serbs, Croats, and Slovenes. During the Second World War she was transported to Germany for forced labor, and then she worked in Trieste as a secretary and translator for the Allied military administration. Beginning in 1948, she lived and worked as a writer in Sydney, Australia. She founded the literary magazine Svobodni razgovori (Free Conversations) in 1982 and served as its editor.

Gruden wrote in both English and her native Slovene. Gruden also translated from Slovene and Serbo-Croatian. She is known among the Slovene community and in Australian literary circles as a prolific writer of the haiku poetic form. She was member of the Slovene Writers' Association.

Gruden has been included into several anthologies, among them Antologija slovenskih pesnic (The Anthology of Slovene Woman Poets; Založba Tuma, 2004), Zbornik avstralskih slovencev (Anthology of Australian Slovenes; Slovenian-Australian Literary & Art Circle, 1988), Album slovenskih književnikov (Album of Slovene Literati; Mladinska Knjiga, 2006), Australian Made: A Multicultural Reader (University of Sydney, 2010), and Fragments from Slovene Literature: An Anthology of Slovene Literature (Slovene Writers Association, 2005).

== Bibliography ==
- Ljubezen pod džakarando. Ljubljana: Prešernova družba, 2002 COBISS 120212736
- Snubljenje duha. Ljubljana: Slovenska izseljenska matica, 1994 COBISS 41489920
