= Peter F. B. Alsop =

Australian engineer and historian

- Born: Peter Findon Bethune Alsop; 13 June 1935; Geelong, Australia
- Died: 6 September 2014 (aged 79); Geelong, Australia
- Citizenship: Australia
- Engineering career
- Discipline: Civil engineer
- Institutions: Country Roads Board

Peter Findon Bethune Alsop (13 June 1935 – 6 September 2014) was an Australian engineer and historian from Geelong, Victoria. He was responsible for researching and preserving many important road bridges and historic buildings in Geelong and the Victorian Western District.

Alsop was an engineer with the Country Roads Board for the Geelong District. While in that position, he argued successfully in a number of cases, that new, improved road alignments should be provided when historic bridges were to be replaced, which would save the bridge at the same time.

Alsop was on the committee of Engineering Heritage Victoria (which later was merged with the Institution of Engineers Australia), and the National Trust of Australia (Victoria).

Alsop was president of the Geelong Historical Society from 1984 to 2007. His large corpus of publications has been indexed and referenced by the State Library of Victoria.

== Awards ==
The Council of Deakin University approved in June 2014 that: the honorary degree of Master of Science be awarded to Mr Peter Alsop.

The Geelong Historical Society Peter F B Alsop Occasional Lecture was created in 2007 in his honour.

Alsop was awarded the 2008 Royal Historical Society of Victoria Awards of Merit.

== Publications ==
- The wreck of the 'W.B. Godfrey Country Roads Board, Geelong 1968.
- The telegraph bridge at Ashby, Geelong, Geelong Local Histories, Geelong, October 1971
- A history of the Shelford iron bridge over the Leigh River, Bannockburn-Rokewood Road, Shire of Leigh : with a note on the designer of the bridge, Mr. Charles Anthony Corbett Wilson C.E., and a history of the Settlers' Arms Inn at Shelford published by the Author Geelong 1971
- A history of the Great Ocean Road. Geelong Historical Society, Geelong, 1982
- 'The Early Roads of Victoria: Part 1: an Outline History 1901 to 1844', Roads Victoria, vol. 4, 1984, pp. 9–11.
- 'The Early Roads of Victoria: Part 2: an Outline History 1844 to 1853', Roads Victoria, vol. 5, 1985, pp. 9–13.
- 'The Early Roads of Victoria: Part 3: an Outline History of Victoria's Early Roads: the Gold Rush Era, 1851 to 1856', Roads Victoria, vol. 6, 1985, pp. 4–6.
- 'The Early Roads of Victoria: an Outline History, 1801-1844', Accounting History Newsletter, vol. 13, Summer, 1986, pp. 13–19.
- Dennys Lascelles Austin & Co. Wool Stores, Geelong, Australia: submission for world heritage listing: revised draft. 1989. Lewis, Miles, Alsop, Peter, Turnbull, Mark and National Trust of Australia (Victoria)
- Sources for history of bridges, published by the author, 1990
- Bridges over the Goulburn River at Nagambie, Victoria: a note on locations and dating with especial reference to Chinamans Bridge, published by the author Geelong, Vic. : P.F.B. Alsop, February 1991
- A History of the Geelong Tunnel, The Author, Geelong, Vic, 1996, 48 pp.
- A history of the Old Iron Bridge at Shelford Shelford Historical Society, 1998
- Nineteenth century engineers in the colony of Victoria Published by the author Geelong North 2002, ISBN 0958166102
- 'Marnock Vale', Geelong Historical Society, Rippleside, Vic. 2006, Reprinted from Investigator, Vol. 39, no. 2, June 2004 with additional illustrations
