= Harold Russell Maddock =

Australian jockey

Russ Maddock in Her Majesty's colours

Harold Russell Maddock (11 March 1918 – 8 June 2014) was an Australian-born jockey who rode in Queensland, NSW and Victoria. His overseas itinerary included Singapore, Malaya, France, Sweden, Ireland and the United Kingdom.

Maddock was born in Brisbane and began his career as an apprentice in 1934 and in 1936 rode his first winner "Camogean" at only his 2nd ride in a race, in Toowoomba, a provincial city about 80 miles west of Brisbane. He was apprenticed to a horsetrainer named Mitchell. He became one of the top Australian jockeys with many jockeys' premierships to his name. In 1959 he was named "Jockey of the Century" during the Queensland Centennial. In Australia he rode the great "Sefiona", High Rank", "Timor", "Earlwood", "Auction", and "Proletaire", to name but a few. Despite regular attempts to tempt him overseas he remained in Brisbane until a short venture to Malaysia in 1960 followed by a contract in the United Kingdom saw him move to horseracing Utopia. He settled into the UK racing scene quickly with a win at his first ride in the UK at Aintree on Mix n Match in the Earl of Sefton Plate on 25 March 1961 and the wins soon mounted up. He was successful in the UK and France. A few of the horses he was associated with in the UK are "The Pouncer", "Althrey Don", "Mountain Call", "Laureate" and "Park Top". In 1969 he was injured in a race fall at Newbury and after recovery broke the same leg in a training accident prior to his return to racing. It was the end of his career but he continued to live in the UK at his London home. His wife Brenda Pitt Maddock (from a family (Grenier and Pitt) involved in Qld racing since the 1840s) an artist continued her painting career and both daughters were on UK stage and TV and finally in 1981 he returned to Queensland and settled on the Gold Coast where he retired. He is buried in Brisbane's Toowong Cemetery and is in the council record search as Harold.
