= Green Point, Central Coast =

Green Point Central Coast, New South Wales
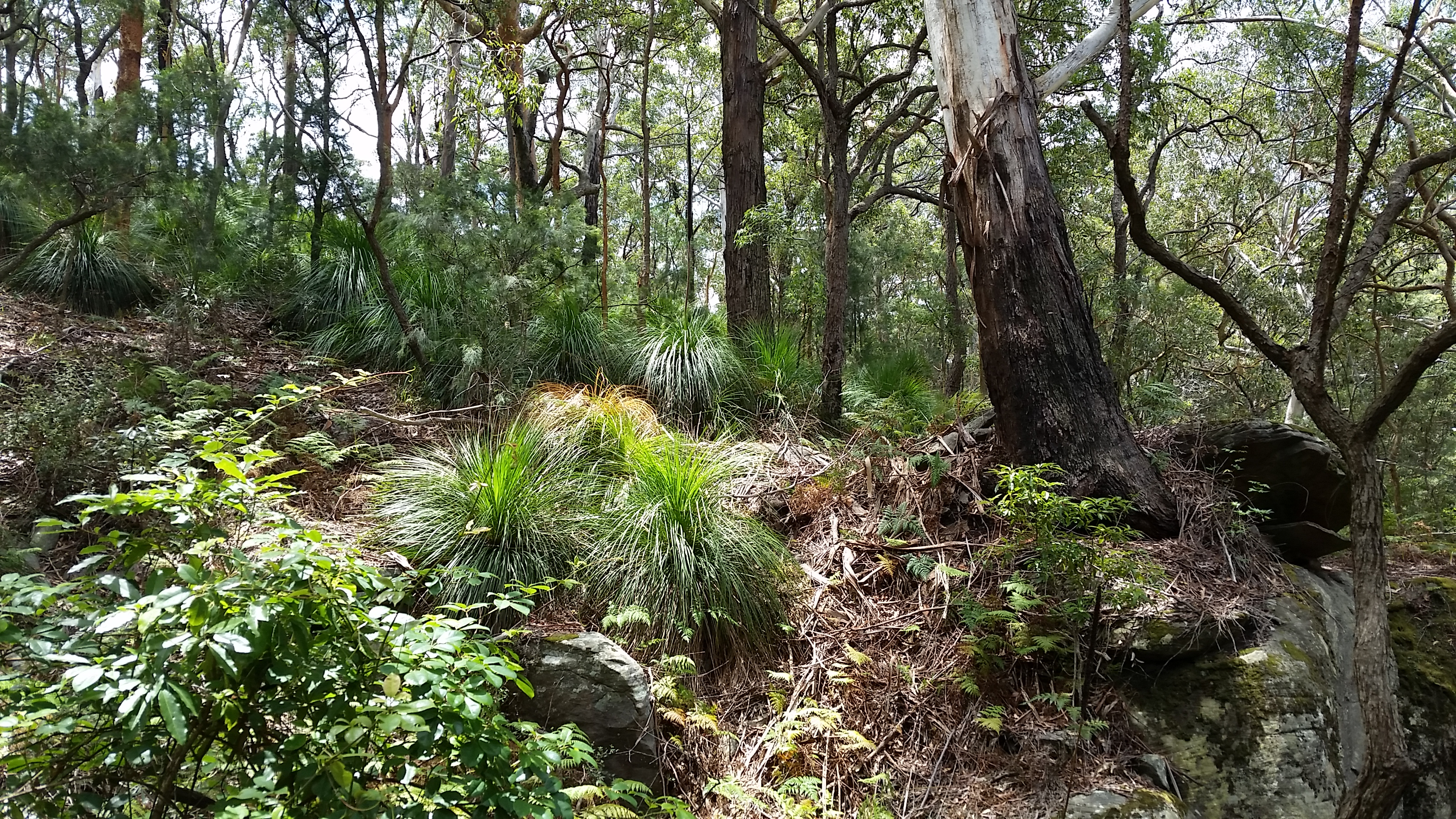
- Kincumber Mountain Reserve at Green Point, NSW

- Coordinates: 33°27′54″S 151°21′36″E
- Population: 6,810 (2021 census)
  - Density: 811/km^{2} (2,100/sq mi)
- Postcode(s): 2251
- Area: 8.4 km^{2} (3.2 sq mi)
- Location: 7 km (4 mi) SE of Gosford; 9 km (6 mi) W of Terrigal; 85 km (53 mi) from Sydney
- LGA(s): Central Coast Council
- Parish: Kincumber
- State electorate(s): Terrigal
- Federal division(s): Robertson
Suburbs around Green Point:
| East Gosford | Erina | Erina |
| Brisbane Water | Green Point | Picketts Valley |
| Yattalunga | Kincumber | Kincumber |

Green Point is a south-eastern suburb of the Central Coast region of New South Wales, Australia between Erina and Kincumber accessed by a main road, Avoca Drive.Green Point has a natural border of Nunn's Creek between it and Erina.It is part of the Central Coast Council local government area.

The suburb is served by the Erina Fair shopping complex and Green point shopping centre which includes a Coles supermarket and various cafes and restaurants, there is an Aldi supermarket further along Avoca Drive. Parts of Green Point are adjacent to Brisbane Water, providing water views to many residents.

There is one private school, Green Point Christian College.

== Heritage listings ==
Green Point has a number of heritage-listed sites, including:

- 9 Pixie Avenue: Green Point Foreshore and Structures
- 9 Pixie Avenue: Mulholland's Farm
