= Jack Clancy (Australian footballer) =

Australian rules footballer

Personal information
- Full name: John Dalton Clancy
- Born: 13 July 1934
- Died: 23 March 2014 (aged 79); Melbourne
- Original team: University Blacks
- Debut: Round 1, 22 April 1957, Fitzroy vs. Melbourne, at Brunswick Street Oval

Playing career^{1}
Years	Club	Games (Goals)
1957	Fitzroy	1 (0)
- ^{1} Playing statistics correct to the end of 1957.

John Dalton "Jack" Clancy (13 July 1934 – 23 March 2014) was an Australian rules footballer, playing for Fitzroy Football Club in the Victorian Football League (VFL).

Born in Melbourne, Clancy attended Christian Brothers' College, St Kilda and then the University of Melbourne and, as a 191 cm ruckman, played for University Blacks in the Victorian Amateur Football Association (VAFA), until recruited by Fitzroy for the 1957 VFL season.

Clancy made his senior debut for Fitzroy in Round One that year as 20th man against reigning premiers, Melbourne, spending the whole game on the bench and was dropped back to the reserves. Years later, at a lunch to make his 50th year with the Blacks, then Fitzroy coach Bill Stephen said he never saw a man sitting on the bench as impressively as Clancy. Six weeks later, playing for Fitzroy reserves against the Collingwood Football Club reserves team, Clancy injured his knee and in 1958 Clancy returned to the University Blacks, where he injured his other knee during the 1960 VAFA season.

Clancy played and coached for many years with University Reds (now Fitzroy Reds) and was named at centre half-forward in the club's team of the 20th century.

Following his retirement from football, Clancy played cricket into his fifties, including many social matches for the Parkville Peoples' XI and in the traditional Writers v Artists and Meanjin v Overland fixtures.

In his professional life Clancy was head of Humanities/Communication Studies at Royal Melbourne Institute of Technology where he pioneered courses in cinema and semiotics. He also became secretary of the Friends of the Australian Broadcasting Corporation (ABC) and attended the annual celebrations of Karl Marx's birthday.

Clancy was married to the renowned translator, Dr Patricia Clancy, a former senior lecturer in French at Melbourne University. Together they had two children; Dr David Clancy, a geneticist at the University of Lancaster in England and Rob Clancy, a television producer and journalist.

Clancy died after a long illness in Melbourne on 23 March 2014.
