= John Disney (ornithologist) =

Henry John de Suffren Disney (22 September 1919 – 26 March 2014), better known as John Disney, was an Australian ornithologist of British origin.

== Early years ==
Disney was educated at Cambridge University. He collected birds in Newfoundland and northern Finland. During the Second World War he served in the Royal Air Force.

== Africa ==
Disney spent many years of his career in Africa, first as Science Assistant to the Director of the Kaffrarian Museum, King William's Town, South Africa 1946–1948. He then worked at a cotton research station in East Africa 1948–1962.

== Australia ==
In 1962 Disney moved to Australia to become Curator of Birds at the Australian Museum, a position he served in until his retirement, after which he was a research associate at the museum. In 1975 he led a team of zoologists and ecologists to Lord Howe Island to study the endangered Lord Howe woodhen in its environment, in order to devise a management plan to prevent its extinction. At the time there were no more than 32 woodhens on the island. In 2019 there are over 250 birds.
