= RACQ =

Motoring organisation in Australia

- Formation: 1905
- Headquarters: Eight Mile Plains, Queensland, Australia
- Members: 1.7 million (2026)
- President: Leona Murphy
- Chief Executive Officer: David Carter
- Revenue: $1.8 billion (2025)
- Website: www.racq.com.au
- Formerly called: Automobile Club of Queensland

The RACQ, formally the Royal Automobile Club of Queensland, is a mutual organisation and the largest club by membership in Queensland, with 1.7 million members as of January 2026.

RACQ distributes insurance under the RACQ Insurance brand.

== History ==
Eighteen motorists formed the Automobile Club of Queensland in 1905 at a meeting of almost all the motorists in Brisbane which was held at the School of Arts, in Ann Street. The club was formed as an advocacy group, styled after the successful Royal Automobile Club of England. Of the eighteen founding members, ten were medical practitioners. Their belief that automobiles could be a reliable means for visiting patients was used to leverage a more positive image of cars in the public consciousness. At the time of formation there were only 16 registered privately owned motor cars in Queensland.

In 1921, in recognition of the club's patriotic efforts during World War I, it was given Royal Patronage. In 1925, RACQ Roadside Assistance was born when the Club commissioned two mechanics, George Clark and Eddie Henderson, to patrol the roads in search of disabled vehicles. In the 1970s the club began to expand its services including the formation of RACQ Insurance.

In 2011, following Cyclone Yasi in Northern Queensland and flooding in central and southern Queensland, RACQ Foundation was launched to assist community groups devastated by natural disasters.

RACQ was inducted into the Queensland Business Leaders Hall of Fame in 2014. In November 2016, RACQ merged with QT Mutual Bank forming RACQ Bank.

In 2019, trials of Australia's first driverless bus were conducted on Karragarra Island with a view to introducing the service to the islands' communities. The trial was conducted by the Redland City Council and the RACQ.

In September 2025, RACQ sold 90% of RACQ Insurance to Insurance Australia Group, with 10% retained by the RACQ. In December 2025 terms were agreed, subject to regulatory approval, to sell RACQ Bank to Bendigo Bank. The transaction is scheduled to be completed in the first half of 2027.

As at January 2026, the RACQ had 1.7 million members.

== Publications ==
From 1926 until 1934, Queensland Motorist was the RACQ's in-house magazine. It was succeeded by The Road Ahead.

== Community and sponsorships ==
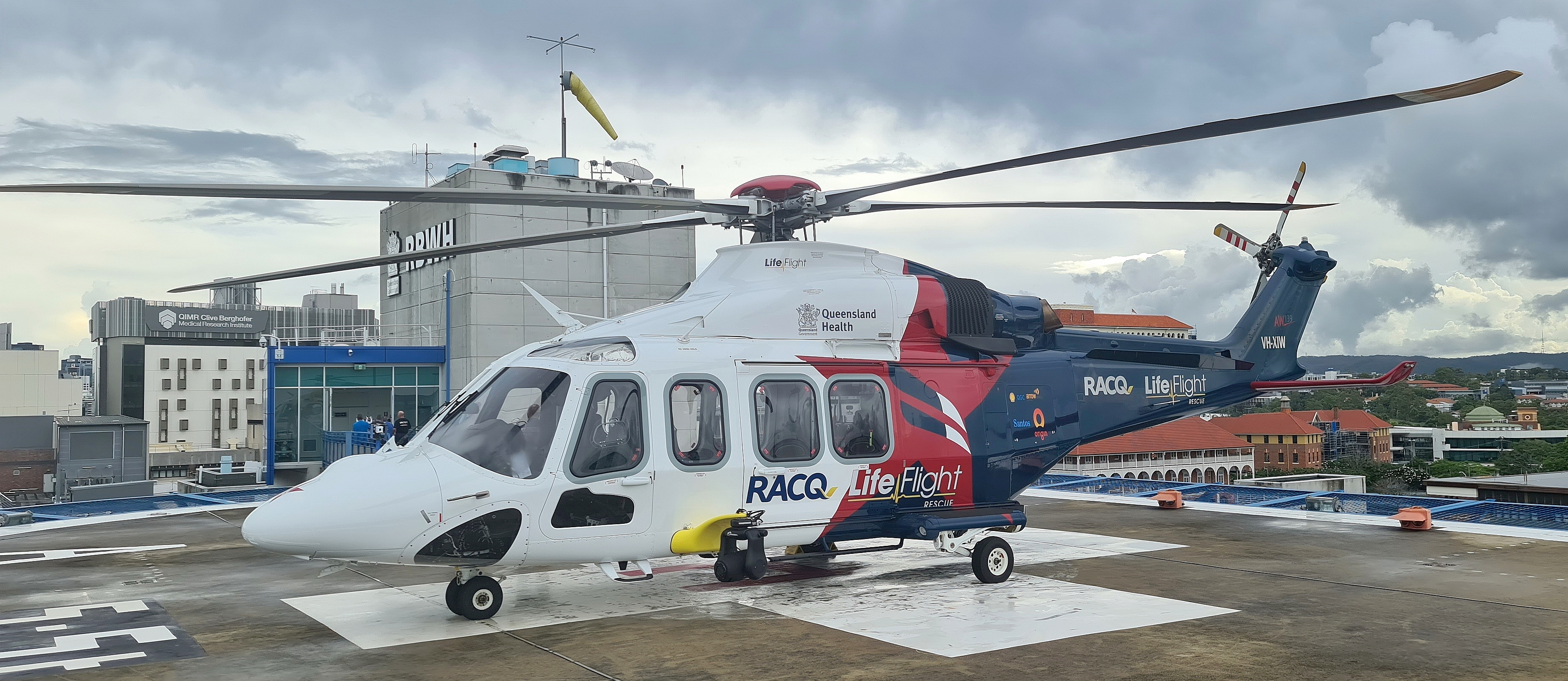
RACQ LifeFlight Rescue helicopter at Royal Brisbane & Women's Hospital

RACQ has also previously sponsored a broad range of events which sought to improve driver skills and promote road safety initiatives including:

- The All Schools Pedal Prix.
- RACQ Technology Challenge Maryborough.
- Older People Speak Out, Years Ahead courses.
- The Queensland Road Safety Awards.
- The RACQ Historic Motoring Council Rally (now MotorFest).
- The RACQ Insurance International Women's Day Fun Run.
- The Prevent Alcohol and Risk-related Trauma in Youth program run by the Royal Brisbane & Women's Hospital.

Free2go was a youth program initiative by RACQ designed to help learner drivers to get their licence and included roadside assistance. Utilising the online learner logbook, Queensland learner drivers could record their required 100 hours of supervised on-road driving electronically.

In 2011, RACQ launched RACQ Foundation to assist community groups to recover from natural disasters and drought. In 2020 the foundation expanded its remit for a short period to include groups hit by the COVID-19 pandemic. Since 2011, the foundation has awarded more than $9.24 million in grants.

== Locations ==
The RACQ head offices are in Brisbane at Eight Mile Plains and 60 Edward Street, Brisbane in the CBD. The club has numerous offices throughout Queensland.

In 2013, RACQ released its Mobile Member Centre (MMC) a “branch on wheels”, the MMC is used for exhibitions and trade shows, when not needed to assist members following large-scale disasters.

In 2019, RACQ launched the RACQ Mobility Centre of Excellence, the site was previously home to the Mount Cotton Training Centre and has since been utilised as a facility for driver training as well as a research hub for new and emerging vehicle technology. The 45-hectare site features a range of facilities including a road circuit, skid pan, 4WD track and conference spaces and is available for hire by third parties for events and driver training sessions.

== Controversies ==
=== 2015 ===
In July 2015, the RACQ was the subject of a report on A Current Affair that reported how the RACQ dismissed tow truck driver Murray French for breaking a road rule when he towed a wheelchair-using handicapped person's car on a tilt-tray tow truck while the person was still seated in the car. The event was earlier reported by the Logan Reporter and BigRigs.com.au. Thousands of RACQ members and the general public signed a petition calling for the RACQ to reinstate French. On 9 July, there was a protest at the RACQ office asking for French's reinstatement. The RACQ issued a response on their Web site disputing the information in the A Current Affair report and defending the decision to dismiss the driver.

=== 2023 ===
In February 2023, the Australian Securities & Investments Commission commended civil penalty proceedings against RACQ in the Federal Court, alleging that product disclosure statements for several RACQ insurance policies were misleading as they included statements that certain discounts would be applied to customers’ insurance premiums, it was found that the discounts were only applied by RACQ to the base insurance premium, and not to additional premiums paid for certain optional extras. The proceedings, which concluded later in 2023, found that RACQ had sent the misleading product disclosure statements on at least five million occasions between March 2017 and March 2022, resulting in over 450,000 customers missing out on an estimated $86.5 million in discounts.
