= Technology Challenge Maryborough =

The Fraser Coast Technology Challenge is an annual youth and technology event held in Maryborough, Queensland, Australia. The Royal Automobile Club of Queensland has been a committed supporter of this event. The Fraser Coast Technology Challenge aims to help develop efficient, environmentally friendly, vehicles as forms of transport, as well as using emerging technologies in ways to help further students education. Schools from across Australia and New Zealand enter teams in the challenge. 2012 was the 10 year anniversary of the first running of the event. Following the COVID-19 pandemic in Australia, the event has not returned, and has been superseded by the QLD Pedal Prix Super Series.

== 24 Hour Endurance Event ==
The blue-ribbon event is the 24-hour Human Powered Vehicle (HPV) endurance race. The race runs from 12:00 pm Saturday to 12:00 pm Sunday on the second weekend of September – the weekend of the Technology Challenge Event. School HPV teams arrive at Maryborough throughout the Thursday and Friday of the week. All teams undergo HPV scrutineering and team license checks on the Friday afternoon. All teams camp on the two school ovals of the school on Friday night. Following the Saturday morning official race briefing, the streets are closed and a 2-hour practice/qualifying session is held for all teams. The other minor events run during the morning, before the race start at 12:00 pm.

The inaugural race in 2002 was won by the local Open Boys team from Maryborough State High School. Maryborough State High School teams won the 24-hour event three years in a row. In 2005, Centenary Heights State High School broke the local team's three-year consecutive winning streak, before Maryborough took back the title in 2006. In 2007, Nanango State High School began a streak of three consecutive overall wins. In Recent years, several different schools have won the 24-hour race.

=== Track ===
In the early years, the track was 1.2 km long. The current track is 1.53 km long, and forms a rectangle around Maryborough State High School and Central SS. The two important sections of the track for overtaking are the hairpin corner at the end of the start/finish straight, and the 0.45 km long hill rise on the back side of the school.

=== Winners ===
Year	Entrants	Overall winner	Laps	Fastest lap	By Team	Official Timing
2002	16	Maryborough State High School		Not Recorded	Not Recorded	
2003		Maryborough State High School		Not Recorded	Not Recorded	
2004		Maryborough State High School		Not Recorded	Not Recorded	
2005		Centenary Heights State High School		2:01.39	Tannum SHS	
2006		Maryborough State High School		1:55.25	MSHS Rhinos	
Longer Track Debuted						
2007		Nanango State High School		2:35.27	MSHS Rhinos	
2008		Nanango State High School		2:26.56	Nanango Slipstreamers	
2009		Nanango State High School (Slipstreamers)	491	2:12.48	MSHS Wallabeasts	
2010		St Mary's College Maryborough (Fast Forward)		2:16.1	Springwood Storm	
2011	105	St Mary's College Maryborough (Shooting Stars)	502	2:18.4	Springwood Stealth	MyLaps
2012	107	St Mary's College Maryborough (Synergy Racing)	494	2:19.9	Urgangan Baboons	MyLaps
2013	118	Ormeau Woods SHS (Ormeau Eagles Senior)	480	2:06.1	Ipswich Grammar (Hybrid)	MyLaps
2014	122	Staunch	500	1:56.0	Rode Rage	MyLaps
2015	121	Switched on Too (Hybrid)	522	2:05.2	Switched on Too (Hybrid)	MyLaps
2016	141	Ormeau Woods State High School	535	1:59.113	Road Runners (Hybrid)	Sporthive
2017	?	St Mary's College	587	?	Code Red	

Since the first staging of this event, the number of entrants has increased dramatically (from 16 HPV teams in 2002 to 121 in 2015) and now includes many categories of HPVs, including Tandem and Hybrid. The Technology Challenge was originally modelled on the RACV Energy Breakthrough held in Maryborough, Victoria. One of the original organisers from the Victorian event helped instigate and organise the first Queensland event after he relocated to Maryborough, Qld. 2007 saw the first non-Queensland entry, from Parade College in Victoria. At the time they were considered the National Champions, but they only managed fourth. In 2014, the Victorian Rode Rage Team entered and finished 4th overall.

=== Endurance Teams ===
Secondary schools enter up to 10 person teams:
6 to 8 dedicated riders
– Junior (Yr 8 to 10)
– Senior/Open (Yr 11/12)
2 dedicated Pit/support crew
1 team manager/representative

== Minor Events ==
Other events held at the Challenge include: CO_{2} Dragsters, Robotics, Solar Powered boats, Solar powered cars and the Smilie Pushcarts. The top New Zealand CO_{2} Dragsters also come and compete against the top Queensland dragsters.

The sponsors of the event, Fraser Coast Regional Council, Queensland Events, RACQ, Ergon Energy, Handy Hire, IP Telco, ABSComTech, Station Square Shopping Centre, Rotary Club of Maryborough, Rotary Club of Maryborough Sunrise and Fraser Coast Chronicle continue to see the event grow in professionalism and enthusiasm, providing a fantastic platform for young people to learn through technology and teamwork in a fun and safe environment.

== Other HPV Races and Series ==
- Victorian HPV Series – Victoria
- Australian HPV Super Series – South Australia
- RACV Energy Breakthrough – Victoria
