= Victorian HPV Grand Prix Series =

- Category: HPV Racing (Velomobile Racing)
- Country: (Victoria (state)) Victoria, Australia
- Inaugural season: 2011
- Teams: 80+
- Official website: vichpvseries.com.au

The Victorian HPV Grand Prix Series is an annual championship held in Victoria featuring HPV's (human powered vehicles) racing around enclosed circuits for periods between six and 24 hours.

== 2024 Event Calendar ==
Event	Location	Duration	Date
Round 1	Casey Fields	6 Hour	
Round 2	Calder Park	8 Hour	
Round 3	Sandown	7 Hour	
Round 4	Casey Fields	6 Hour	

== Round 1 - Casey Fields ==
Casey Fields Criterium Track (short layout)
- Location: Cranbourne, Victoria
- Length: 1.6 km (0.99 mi)

Round 1 of the Victorian HPV Series is a six-hour race at the Casey Fields Criterium Circuit.

== Round 2 - Calder Park ==
Knox Grand Prix Circuit
- Location: Wantirna South, Victoria
- Length: 0.8 km (0.50 mi)

Round 2 of the Victorian HPV Series was held at Calder Park Raceway.

== Round 3 - Sandown ==
Bendigo EEV HPV Grand Prix Circuit
- Location: Bendigo, Victoria
- Length: 1.1 km (0.68 mi)

Round 2 of the Victorian HPV Series was held Sandown Raceway.

== Round 4 - Casey Fields ==
Sandown International Raceway
- Location: Melbourne, Victoria
- Length: 3.104 km (1.929 mi)

Round 4 of the Victorian HPV Series returns to the Casey Fields Criterium Circuit for another six hour race. The longer version of the track is used for the final round. This is a compulsory round for teams to be eligible for championship points.

== Results ==
=== 2011 Championship ===
Category	Bike	Team	Round 1 Points	Round 2 Points	Round 3 Points	Total Points
Community	Aurora	Aurora Racing	55	89	63	207
Veteran	Lynx	SMS/BGS OF	45	66	52	163
Open Girls	Cassiopeia	SMS	46	65	49	160
Open Secondary	Helter Skelter	Woodleigh	48	80	59	187
Senior Secondary	Zavanz	EDEC	50	82	58	190
Middle Secondary	UNO	Crusoe SC	52	74	56	182
Junior Class	Shooting Star	SMS/BGS	22	19	28	69

=== 2012 Championship ===
Category	Bike	Team	Round 1 Points	Round 2 Points	Round 3 Points	Total Points
Community	Tru Blu	Tru Blu Racing	59	88		x
Veteran	PaceMakers	EDEC	49	75		x
Open Girls	Ceto	SMS/BGS	44	72		x
Open Secondary	Helter Skelter	Woodleigh		78		x
Senior Secondary	Zavanz	EDEC	53	81		x
Middle Secondary	Fire Breathing Rubber Duckies	EDEC	42	67		x
Junior Class	Red Rocket	Tooradin Primary School	18	14		x

=== 2013 Championship ===
Category	Bike	Team	Round 1 Points	Round 2 Points	Round 3 Points	Round 4 Points	Total Points
Community	Tru Blu	Tru Blu Racing					x
Veteran	The Pacemakers	EDEC					x
Open Girls							x
Open Secondary	ZEUS	SMS/BGS					x
Senior Secondary	She's Well Fit	Mt Eliza					x
Middle Secondary							x
Junior Class	Shooting Star	SMS/BGS					x

2015 VIC HPV Series Champions
	Vehicle Name	School/Organisation
Community	Relentless Racing (SAWAVIC)	Relentless Racing (SAWAVIC)
Community Elite	Toothless	Wattle Racing
Masters	G2 Flyer	G2 Racing
Masters	PUDS Racing	PUDS Racing
Open Secondary	Asphalt Melter	Woodleigh School
Senior Secondary	Fire Breathing Rubber Duckies	EDEC HPV Team
Female	Gremlins	EDEC HPV Team
Middle Secondary	Gremlins Too	EDEC HPV Team
Junior	Miss Janey	Maiden Gully Primary School

== Other Australian HPV races and series ==
- Queensland - RACQ Technology Challenge
- South Australia - Australian HPV Super Series
- (Victoria (state)) Victoria - RACV Energy Breakthrough
