= Energy Breakthrough =

- Category: HPV, Hybrid & Electric Velomobile Racing
- Country: Maryborough, Victoria, Australia
- Inaugural season: 1991
- Teams: 240 over all categories
- Official website: https://www.eb.org.au

The Energy Breakthrough, previously known by its sponsorship name RACV Energy Breakthrough, is a joint initiative of the Country Education Partnership, the Shire of Central Goldfields and the Royal Automobile Club of Victoria (RACV).

The main event involves a 24-hour trial in which students of secondary schools around Australia race their Human Powered Vehicles and Hybrid Powered People Carriers around a street circuit of 1.58 kilometres. The teams which race these vehicles consist of 8 riders, usually four male and four female participants. Leading teams have traveled over 1000 kilometres in the history of the 24-hour trial.

Other events during the Energy Breakthrough include a 14-hour HPV trial for primary school students, pushcarts, the Try-Athlon, (which consists of a sprint event, an 8-hour endurance trial and an obstacle course), and the also popular Innovations in Technology category.

== Categories ==
Human Powered Vehicles (HPV)

- HPV A1: Primary School entrants from schools with 200 or less students
- HPV A2: Primary School entrants from schools with more than 200 students
- HPV B1: up to 8 racers, at least half of which must be female, years 7–8.
- HPV B2: up to 8 racers, at least half of which must be female, years 7–10.
- HPV C: up to 8 racers, at least half of which must be female, years 7–12.
- HPV All Female: 8 female students from years 7–12.
- HPV Open: 8 students of any gender from years 7–12.

Tryathlon

- Primary (Class A): Teams with an even gender ratio, from Primary year levels
- Class B/C: Teams with at least 50% female, from 7-12 Year levels
- Class Open: Teams with an uneven gender ratio, from any year level

Pushcarts

- A1: schools with enrolment of less than 200
- A2: schools with enrolment of greater than 200

Hybrid / Energy Efficient Vehicles

- Hybrid 1 - Vehicles with two power sources, including pedal.
- Hybrid 2 - Vehicles with two power sources, excluding pedal.
- All Petrol - Vehicles powered solely by petrol. (since 2011)
- All Electric - Vehicles powered solely by electricity. (since 2011)

Innovations in Technology

- Challenge 1: Crafty Design
- Challenge 2: Junkyard Challenge
- Robotics with the use of SPHERO robots

== Circuits ==
RACV Track
- Location: Maryborough, Victoria
- Opened: 1991
- Major events: 24 hour trial, Pushcart sprint event, Try-Athlon sprint event, Try-Athlon obstacle event.

Crameri Lane section removed (2017–present)
- Length: 1.58 km (0.98 mi)
- Turns: 10

New section at the northern end added (2016)
- Length: 1.76 km (1.09 mi)
- Turns: 12

Crameri Lane section added (2015)
- Length: 1.58 km (0.98 mi)
- Turns: 10

Inaugural Layout (1991-2014)
- Length: 1.34 km (0.83 mi)
- Turns: 8

=== Track 1 ===
The Track 1 (Previously RACV Track) is a challenging 1.58 km street circuit that reflects real-world conditions. This track is used for the Secondary HPVs, Energy Efficient Vehicles, the Try-athlon Sprint event and Obstacle course and the Pushcart Sprint event.

A lap begins with an immediate left turn out onto Napier St, then a slower left hander into Christian St, a difficult corner and a prime place for accidents. In the 2015 and 2016 layouts, halfway up the Christian St straight, riders would turn right into Burke St, then glance left into Crameri Lane, and then turn left again into the Burns St straight. This was removed for the 2017 event due to concerns about emergency access to this area during the event. Instead, like the inaugural layout, riders continue straight up the hill, then turn into a 90 degree left hander into Burns St. The entrance to the rear pit lane is at the end of the first part of the straight. A fast right hander opens wider into a left hander and continues down the straight. In the 1991-2015 layout, the vehicles broke heavily into a tight left hander back into the park, and this corner commonly had accidents and overtakes. In 2016, as part of the Princes Park master plan, a new section was developed with a downhill left right chicane followed by two fast left handers. This opens into the longest straight on the track. The EEV pits run for about the first 130 metres of the straight. The straight runs alongside Lake Victoria and has a few, barely noticeable kinks on the run towards turn 10. A long left turn runs alongside the front pits and up to the finish line underneath the temporary RACV bridge.

=== Vicroads (formerly Holden, then CFA) Track ===
Vicroads Track
- Location: Maryborough, Victoria
- Opened: 2001
- Major events: HPV Primary 14 hour trial, Pushcart endurance event, Try-Athlon 8 hour trial.

Current Layout (2001-03, 2005-present)
- Length: 1.1 km (0.68 mi)
- Turns: 11

Northern ring removed (2004)
- Length: 0.8 km (0.50 mi)
- Turns: 8

The Vicroads Track is located between the Maryborough Caravan Park and the Princes Park oval. It is approximately 1.1 km long and includes a number of challenging left and right hand bends. This track is used for the HPV Primary 14 hour trial, the Try-athlon 8 hour trial and the Pushcart endurance event.

A lap of the Vicroads Track starts on the wide front straight that is on an old CFA running track. The track narrows out as pit lane traffic reenters the track. Turn 1 and 2 is a fast right left chicane that often catches riders out on the exit. Turn 3 is a left handed hairpin that opens up on exit. This is followed by a narrow right hand turn into the much wider Holyrood St. This is quickly followed a mere 50m later by turn 5, which is a left hander that turns into Park Road, the longest straight on the circuit. This straight is roughly 270m long. There is a small left kink at the start of the straight, and the rear pit lane also is located here. A 90 degree left turn is at the end of the straight, and the exit is narrow, this is the entrance back into Princes Park. A tight but quick glance to the right follows and runs into the long right hander that rides past camping areas for teams. The trickiest section of track is next. The final three corners very quickly proceed each other. Underneath the VicRoads bridge, riders enter the tight left turn, which is often overshot. From there, there is a short 30m straight along a netball court and into the left right chicane. Traffic can be an issue here as some riders enter the front pit lane. Similar to the exit of turn 2, the exit of the final corner is a common place for rollovers, as some riders go through the last corner too quick and roll their vehicle. Riders who make it through this tremendously difficult section of track blast down the straight and under the red bridge to start another lap of the Vicroads Track.

In 2023 all on-track action was moved to track 1.

== Recent HPV Results ==
RACV Track 24-hour trial

2016

Overall Pos	Name	Category	Cat Pos	Team	Fastest lap	Laps
1	A Little 2 Aero	OPEN	1	Woodleigh School	02:08	532
2	Don't Feed the Richard	OPEN	2	Bendigo Senior Secondary College	02:13	521
3	#onlythebeginning	OPEN	3	Highview College	02:16	518
4	Perzeus	OPEN	4	Berwick Grammar School	02:20	514
5	Fast Torque	OPEN	5	Catholic College Bendigo	02:21	496

2014

Overall Pos	Name	Category	Cat Pos	Team	Fastest lap	Laps
1	Grand Theft Mango	OPEN	1	Bendigo Senior Secondary College	01:42.0	682
2	Draggin' Dutchman	OPEN	2	Highview College	01:45.3	676
3	Perzeus	OPEN	3	St Margarets	01:47.8	673
4	Asphalt Melter	OPEN	4	Woodleigh School	01:44.7	656
5	BYO	OPEN	5	Caulfield Grammar School	01:48.1	615

2013

Overall Pos	Name	Category	Cat Pos	Team	Fastest lap	Laps
1	Zeus	OPEN	1	St Margarets	01:49.673	651
2	EVO	OPEN	2	Kingswood College	01:51.173	632
3	Hong Kong Tiger	OPEN	3	Highview College	01:49.027	625
4	Kind of a Big Deal	OPEN	4	Catholic College Bendigo	01:44.173	611
5	Care Factor	B2	1	Eaglehawk SC	01:35.577	605

2012

Overall Pos	Name	Category	Cat Pos	Team	Fastest lap	Laps
1	DIY	OPEN	1	Bendigo Senior SC	01:41	687
2	Zeus	OPEN	2	St Margarets	01:41	660
3	Gunna Have a Bad Time	C	1	Bendigo Senior SC	01:50	623
4	Fun Loving and Beautiful	OPEN	3	Catholic College Bendigo	01:49	619
5	BYO	OPEN	4	Caulfield Grammar School	01:41	618

2011

Overall Pos	Name	Category	Cat Pos	Team	Fastest lap	Laps
1	Zavanz	C	1	EDEC	01:46.333	639
2	Just Razzin	OPEN	1	Bendigo Senior SC	01:47.547	637
3	Dennis	OPEN	2	Highview College	01:49.416	614
4	EVO	OPEN	3	Kingswood College	01:52.190	610
5	Arnold	C	2	Bendigo Senior SC	01:51.893	583

Vicroads Track 14-hour trial (Primary Track)

Vicroads Track 14-hour trial (Primary Track)

2014

Overall Pos	Name	Category	Cat Pos	Team	Fastest lap	Laps
1	Miss Janey	A2	1	Maiden Gully PS	01:35.827	401
2	Overtaker	A2	2	Frankston PS	01:40.593	386
3	Velocity	A2	3	White Hills PS	01:41.597	374
4	Velocity4	A2	4	Maryborough Education Centre	01:48.973	372
5	Insane Boltz	A2	5	Jells Park PS	01:48.973	368

2013

Overall Pos	Name	Category	Cat Pos	Team	Fastest lap	Laps
1	Overtakers	A2	1	Frankston PS	01:39.687	356
2	Miss Janey	A2	2	Maiden Gully PS	01:44.740	356
3	Fast	A2	3	Maryborough Education Centre	01:54.943	336
4	Ziptar	A2	4	Maiden Gully PS	01:52.663	330
5	Tipan	A2	5	Tootgarook PS	01:46.563	328

2011

Overall Pos	Name	Category	Cat Pos	Team	Fastest lap	Laps
1	Ziptar	A2	1	Maiden Gully PS	1:51.343	369
2	Xlr 8	A2	2	Lloyd Street School	1:47.897	356
3	Eco Racer 1	A2	3	St Therese's PS	1:52.880	349
4	Grease Lightning	A2	4	Lloyd Street School	1:54.000	342
5	Eco Racer 2	A2	5	St Thecrap PS	1:51.674	341

More Race Results & Records
https://www.eb.org.au/results/

== Other HPV Events and Series ==
- Queensland - RACQ Technology Challenge
- South Australia - Australian HPV Super Series
- (Victoria (state)) Victoria - Victorian HPV Series
