= Frank Vaughan (rugby league) =

Australian Catholic priest and New South Wales Rugby League player

Orders
- Ordination: 29 November 1947

Personal details
- Born: Francis Vaughan; 1 August 1918
- Died: 23 July 2014 (aged 95)
- Denomination: Catholic Church
- Rugby league career

Playing information
- Position: Centre
Club
Years	Team	Pld	T	G	FG	P
1939	Eastern Suburbs	2	1	1	0	5

Frank Vaughan (1 August 1918 – 23 July 2014) was a Catholic priest of the Diocese of Broken Bay and a rugby league footballer in the New South Wales Rugby League. He played for Eastern Suburbs in 1939. He was Parish Priest of Our Lady, Queen of Peace Parish in Normanhurst.

== Rugby league ==
Vaughan played two first grade games for the Sydney Roosters, then called Eastern Suburbs. During this time he scored one try and one goal against North Sydney in a 22–18 match played on 24 June 1939. During the 1939 season, Eastern Suburbs finished fifth out of the eight teams, and did not qualify for the finals.

== The Catholic Church ==
Vaughan became a seminarian for the Archdiocese of Sydney in 1940, and was ordained a priest in 1947. He served in the Parishes of Bankstown, Brighton Le Sands, Sutherland, Lithgow, North Leichhardt, Lidcombe, Campsie, Harris Park, Blackheath, Woy Woy, and Normanhurst. He was the first Parish Priest of Normanhurst; the Parish was established in 1971.
