= William Orchard (water polo) =

Australian water polo player (1929-2014)

Bill Orchard
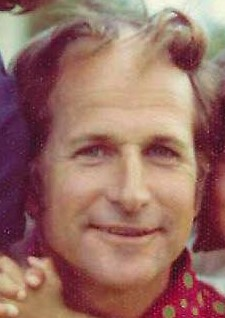
- Orchard in 1975

Personal information
- Full name: William Henry Orchard
- Born: 31 October 1929
- Died: 27 October 2014 (aged 84) Melbourne, Australia
- Height: 182 cm (72 in)
- Weight: 85 kg (187 lb)

Sport
- Sport: Water polo
- Handedness: R
- College team: [University of Melbourne]

Senior clubs
- Years: Team
- 1949-1956: Olympic
National team
| Years | Team | Apps |
| 1950-1956 | Australia | 50 |
Title
- 1953, 1954, 1956: Australian champion (Victoria)

William Henry "Bill" Orchard (31 October 1929 – 27 October 2014) was an Australian water polo player and psychiatrist. He represented Australia at the 1952 Helsinki Olympics and at the 1956 Olympics in his home city of Melbourne.

== Water polo career ==
He played for Australia over the period 1950-56 earning 50 Test Caps. He was studying towards his final year of medicine at the University of Melbourne whilst travelling by boat to and from Helsinki for the 1952 Olympics but nevertheless managed to finish amongst the top students of his graduating year.

== Medical career ==
He trained in psychiatry in the United States (on a Fulbright scholarship) and England and returned to Australia where he practised in psychiatry for over fifty years. He had special interests in the treatment of bipolar disorders and adult attention deficit hyperactivity disorder (ADHD). At his consulting rooms in St. Kilda Road, Melbourne he conducted individual and group therapy sessions for many years. He was known for his advocacy of lithium medication.

Orchard decided to retire voluntarily in 2010, however he later applied to the Medical Board of Australia for re-registration, which was initially refused by the board, but overruled on appeal finding no grounds were made out.

== Death ==
On 28 October 2014, Orchard died at the age of 84. He had four children, including John Orchard (doctor), and twelve grandchildren.
