= Golden Square (disambiguation) =

Golden Square may refer to:

- Golden Square, London
- Golden Square, Victoria, a suburb of Bendigo (Australia)
  - Golden Square Football Club, an Australian rules football club which competes in the Bendigo Football League
  - Golden Square railway station, a closed station on the Melbourne-Bendigo railway
  - Golden Square Secondary College
- Golden Square Mile, former (1875–1930) luxurious neighbourhood in Montreal, Canada
- Golden Square Shopping Centre, a shopping centre in Warrington, Cheshire, England
- Golden Square (Iraq) - the 1941 Iraqi coup d'état, also known as the Golden Square coup, was a pro-Nazi military coup in Iraq on April 1, 1941, that overthrew the British-backed regime of Regent 'Abd al-Ilah. It was led by four Iraqi nationalist army generals, known as "the Golden Square."
- Two squares whose size is related by the golden ratio
