= List of statues of English and British royalty in London =

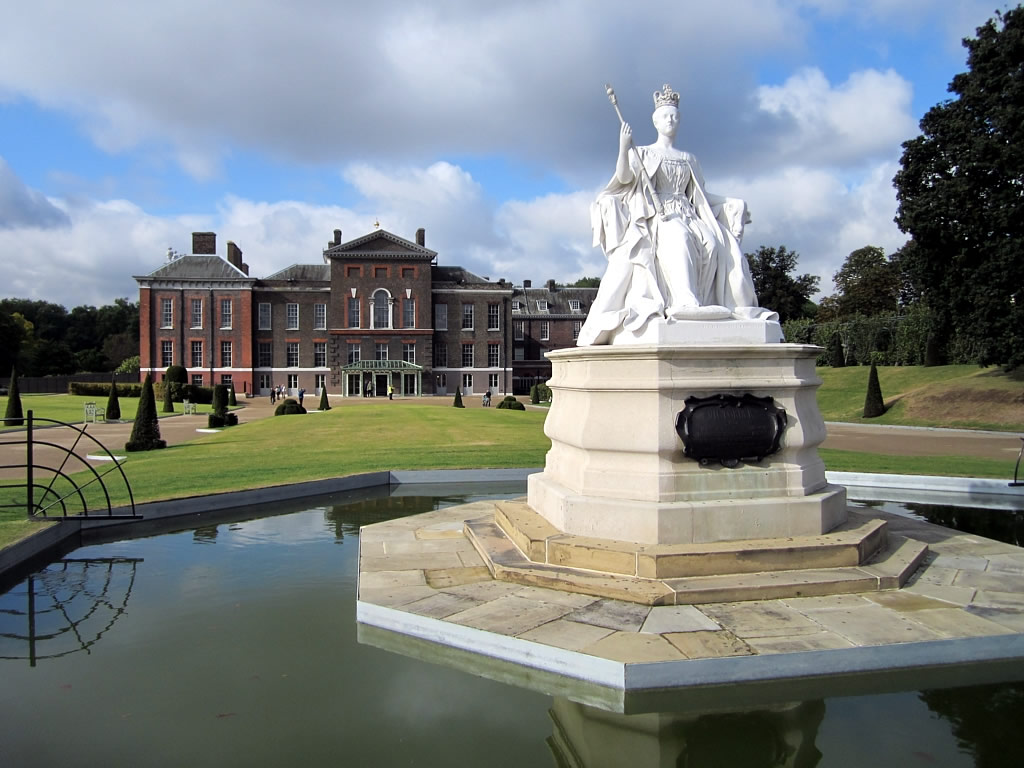
The statue of Queen Victoria outside Kensington Palace. The sculptor was Victoria's daughter, Princess Louise.

This is a list of statues of British royalty in London.

Image	Title / subject	Location and coordinates	Date	Artist / designer	Type	Designation	Notes
More images	Boadicea and Her Daughters Boudica	Near Westminster Pier 51°30′04″N 0°07′26″W	1856–1883	Thomas Thornycroft and William Hamo Thornycroft			
More images	Statue of Alfred the Great	Trinity Church Square, Southwark					
	Statue of Edward the Confessor	Westminster Scholars War Memorial 51.4995°N 0.1292°W	1861	John Birnie Philip			Commemorated here as the re-founder of Westminster Abbey.
	Statue of the Empress Matilda	Maughan Library (King's College London), central tower	1866–1867	Farmer & Brindley			
More images	Statue of Richard I	Outside the Palace of Westminster	1851	Carlo Marochetti			
	Statue of Henry III	Westminster Scholars War Memorial 51.4995°N 0.1292°W	1861	John Birnie Philip			Commemorated here as the rebuilder of Westminster Abbey.
	Statue of Henry III	Maughan Library (King's College London), gateway on Chancery Lane	1891–1896	Farmer & Brindley			
	Statue of Edward I	114 High Holborn	1903	Richard Garbe			
	Eight statues of Eleanor of Castile	Queen Eleanor Memorial Cross, forecourt of Charing Cross railway station	1864–1865	Thomas Earp			
	Statue of Edward III	Maughan Library (King's College London), gateway on Chancery Lane	1891–1896	Farmer & Brindley			
More images	Statue of Henry VIII	Above the entrance to St Bartholomew's Hospital	1702–1703	Francis Bird			
More images	Statue of Anne Boleyn	Church Hill, Carshalton	1967	Dennis Huntley			
	Statue of Edward VI	Guildhall	Early 17th century	Attributed to Andreas Kearne			From the porch of the Guildhall Chapel.
More images	Statue of Edward VI	St Thomas' Hospital, Lambeth	1682	Thomas Cartwright			
More images	Statue of Edward VI	St Thomas' Hospital, Lambeth	1736	Peter Scheemakers			
	Statue of Elizabeth I	Guildhall	c. 1622	Nicholas Stone			Commissioned for the Royal Exchange but rejected, and installed in the porch of the Guildhall Chapel during the sculptor's lifetime.
More images	Statue of Elizabeth I	St Dunstan-in-the-West, Fleet Street	1670–1999	?			
	Statue of Elizabeth I	Royal Exchange	1844	Musgrave Watson			
	Statue of Elizabeth I	Westminster Scholars War Memorial 51.4995°N 0.1292°W	1861	John Birnie Philip			Commemorated here as the founder of Westminster School.
	Statue of Elizabeth I	Maughan Library (King's College London), central tower	1866–1867	Farmer & Brindley			
	Statue of Elizabeth I	Old Guildhall Library, Basinghall Street	c. 1873	J. W. Seale			
More images	Statue of Elizabeth I	Kimpton Fitzroy London Hotel (formerly the Hotel Russell), Russell Square, Bloomsbury	1898–1900	Henry Charles Fehr			
	Statue of Elizabeth I	Harrow School, south tower of Speech Room	19th century; installed on current site in 1925	Richard Westmacott			
More images	Statue of Elizabeth I	Little Dean's Yard, Westminster	2010	Matthew Spender			Commissioned to mark the 450th anniversary of the founding of Westminster School by Elizabeth I.
	Statue of Mary, Queen of Scots	Queen of Scots House, 143–144 Fleet Street 51.514311°N 0.107181°W	1905	?			
	Statue of James I	Temple Bar Gate, Paternoster Square	c. 1670–1672	John Bushnell			
	Statue of James I	Central Criminal Court, Old Bailey	1861–1864	Thomas Thornycroft			Intended for the Palace of Westminster.
	Statue of Anne of Denmark	Temple Bar Gate, Paternoster Square	c. 1670–1672	John Bushnell			
	Statue of Charles I	Guildhall	Early 17th century	Attributed to Andreas Kearne			From the porch of the Guildhall Chapel.
More images	Statue of Charles I	Charing Cross 51.50732°N 0.12770°W	1633	Hubert Le Sueur			The earliest English equestrian statue. Originally commissioned in 1630 by Charles I's Lord Treasurer, Sir Richard Weston, for his house Mortlake Park in Roehampton. Erected on the site of the Charing Cross in 1674–1675, when the pedestal was carved by Joshua Marshall.
	Statue of Charles I	Temple Bar Gate, Paternoster Square	c. 1670–1672	John Bushnell			
	Statue of Charles I	Central Criminal Court, Old Bailey	1671	John Bushnell			Intended for the Royal Exchange.
More images	Statue of Charles I	Royal Hospital Chelsea	1676	Grinling Gibbons			
	Statue of Charles I	Central Criminal Court, Old Bailey	1861–1864	Thomas Thornycroft			Intended for the Palace of Westminster.
	Statue of Charles II	Temple Bar Gate, Paternoster Square	c. 1670–1672	John Bushnell			
	Statue of Charles II	Central Criminal Court, Old Bailey	1671	John Bushnell			
More images	Statue of Charles II	Soho Square	1681	Caius Gabriel Cibber			
	Statue of Charles II	Western vestibule of the Old Guildhall Library	1683	Artus Quellinus III			From the former College of Physicians in Warwick Lane.
	Statue of Charles II	Royal Exchange	1789–1791	John Spiller			
	Statue of Charles II	Central Criminal Court, Old Bailey	1865–1871	Henry Weekes			
More images	Statue of James II	Trafalgar Square	1686	Peter Van Dievoet working in the studio of Grinling Gibbons			
	Statue of William III	Bank of England Museum	1734	Henry Cheere			Commissioned by the Bank of England, which received its royal charter from William III in 1694.
More images	Statue of William III	St James's Square	1807	John Bacon the Younger			
	Statue of William III	Central Criminal Court, Old Bailey	1862–1867	Thomas Woolner			
More images	Statue of William III	Outside Kensington Palace	1908	Heinrich Baucke			
	Statue of Mary II	Central Criminal Court, Old Bailey	1862–1868	Alexander Munro			
More images	Statue of Mary II	Kimpton Fitzroy London Hotel (formerly the Hotel Russell), Russell Square, Bloomsbury	1898–1900	Henry Charles Fehr			
More images	Statue of Queen Anne	Market House, Kingston upon Thames	1706	Francis Bird			
More images	Statue of Queen Anne	Queen Anne's Gate, Westminster	1708 at latest	Francis Bird			
	Statue of Queen Anne	Maughan Library (King's College London), central tower	1866–1867	Farmer & Brindley			
	Statue of Queen Anne	Old Guildhall Library, Basinghall Street	c. 1873	J. W. Seale			
More images	Statue of Queen Anne	St Paul's Churchyard 51.5137°N 0.0999°W	1884–1886 (after an original of 1709–1712)	Richard Claude Belt and Louis-Auguste Malempré, after Francis Bird			
	Statue of Queen Anne	Kimpton Fitzroy London Hotel (formerly the Hotel Russell), Russell Square, Bloomsbury	1898–1900	Henry Charles Fehr			
	Statue of George I	At the top of the spire of St George's Church, Bloomsbury	1730	Unknown			
More images	Statue of George II	Golden Square, Soho	1720	John Nost the Elder			
More images	Statue of George II	Old Royal Naval College, Greenwich	1735 (unveiled)	John Michael Rysbrack			
More images	Statue of George III	The quadrangle at Somerset House	1780	John Bacon			
More images	Statue of George III	Pall Mall	1836	Matthew Cotes Wyatt			
More images	Statue of Charlotte of Mecklenburg-Strelitz	Queen Square, Bloomsbury	c. 1775	Unknown			
More images	Statue of Prince Frederick, Duke of York and Albany	Duke of York Column, Waterloo Place	1832–1834	Richard Westmacott			
More images	Statue of George IV	Trafalgar Square	c. 1829–1843	Francis Legatt Chantrey			
More images	Statue of William IV	Greenwich, by the National Maritime Museum	1844 (unveiled)	Samuel Nixon			
More images	Statue of Prince Edward, Duke of Kent and Strathearn	Park Crescent, Marylebone	1824 (unveiled)	Sebastian Gahagan			
	Statue of Queen Victoria	Palace of Westminster	1855	John Gibson			The enthroned Queen is flanked by personifications of Justice and Clemency.
	Statue of Queen Victoria	Westminster Scholars War Memorial 51.4995°N 0.1292°W	1861	John Birnie Philip			
More images	Statue of Queen Victoria with the attributes of Peace	Friary Park, Friern Barnet 51.61842°N 0.16079°W	1862	Joseph Durham			
	Statue of Queen Victoria	Maughan Library (King's College London), central tower	1866–1867	Farmer & Brindley			
	Statue of Queen Victoria	Old Guildhall Library, Basinghall Street	c. 1873	J. W. Seale			
	Statue of Queen Victoria	St Thomas' Hospital, Lambeth	1873	Matthew Noble			
More images	Statue of Queen Victoria	Temple Bar	1879–1880	Joseph Edgar Boehm			
More images	Statue of Queen Victoria	Imperial College London	1888	Joseph Edgar Boehm			
	Statue of Queen Victoria	Royal Exchange	1891–1896	Hamo Thornycroft			
More images	Statue of Queen Victoria	Kensington Gardens, outside Kensington Palace	1893	Princess Louise, Duchess of Argyll (with Joseph Edgar Boehm)			
More images	Statue of Queen Victoria	New Bridge Street (near Blackfriars Bridge)	1893–1896	Charles Bell Birch			
More images	Statue of Queen Victoria	Carlton House Terrace	c. 1897–1902	Thomas Brock			
	Statue of Queen Victoria	Kimpton Fitzroy London Hotel (formerly the Hotel Russell), Russell Square, Bloomsbury	1898–1900	Henry Charles Fehr			
More images	Statue of Queen Victoria	Outside Croydon Town Hall	1903 (erected)	Francis John Williamson			
More images	Statue of Queen Victoria	Woolwich Town Hall	1905	F. W. Pomeroy			
	Statue of Queen Victoria	Victoria and Albert Museum, entrance façade	c. 1905–1906	Alfred Drury			
	Statue of Queen Victoria	Victoria Memorial, outside Buckingham Palace	1911 (unveiled)	Thomas Brock			
	Statue of Queen Victoria	Victoria Square	2007	Catherine Laugel			
More images	Statue of Prince George, Duke of Cambridge	Whitehall	1907	Adrian Jones			
	Statue of Prince Albert of Saxe-Coburg and Gotha	Royal Exchange	1845–1847	John Graham Lough			
More images	Statue of Prince Albert of Saxe-Coburg and Gotha	Memorial to the Great Exhibition, Prince Consort Road, South Kensington	1863	Joseph Durham			
More images	Statue of Prince Albert of Saxe-Coburg and Gotha	Holborn Circus	1869–1874	Charles Bacon			
More images	Statue of Prince Albert of Saxe-Coburg and Gotha	Albert Memorial 51°30′09″N 0°10′39″W	1871–1876	John Henry Foley and Thomas Brock			
	Statue of Prince Albert of Saxe-Coburg and Gotha	Victoria and Albert Museum, entrance façade	c. 1905–1906	Alfred Drury			
More images	Statue of Edward VII as Prince of Wales	Temple Bar	1879–1880	Joseph Edgar Boehm			
	Statue of Edward VII as Prince of Wales	Royal College of Music	1891	Count Gleichen			The Prince was the college's first president, from 1882 to his accession to the throne in 1901, when he became its patron.
	Statue of Edward VII	114 High Holborn	1903	Richard Garbe			
	Statue of Edward VII	Victoria and Albert Museum, entrance façade	1906	William Goscombe John			
More images	Statue of Edward VII	Outside Tooting Broadway tube station	1911	Louis Fritz Roselieb, later Louis Frederick Roslyn			
More images	Statue of Edward VII	Waterloo Place	1921 (unveiled)	Bertram Mackennal			
	Statue of Alexandra of Denmark	Royal College of Music	1891	Count Gleichen			Princess Alexandra is shown wearing the cap and gown of a Doctor of Music from the Royal University of Ireland, a degree she received during a state visit to Ireland.
	Statue of Alexandra of Denmark	Victoria and Albert Museum, entrance façade	1906	William Goscombe John			
	Statue of Alexandra of Denmark	Royal London Hospital, Whitechapel	1908	George Edward Wade			
	Statue of Maud of Wales, Queen of Norway	10 Palace Green, Kensington	2005	Ada Madssen			Unveiled 27 October 2005 by Harald V.
More images	Statue of George V	Old Palace Yard, Westminster	1947 (unveiled)	William Reid Dick			
More images	Statue of George VI	King George VI and Queen Elizabeth Memorial, The Mall	1954	William McMillan			
More images	Statue of Queen Elizabeth the Queen Mother	King George VI and Queen Elizabeth Memorial, The Mall	2009 (unveiled)	Philip Jackson			
	Statue of Elizabeth II	Royal Albert Hall, South Porch	2022	Poppy Field			
	Statue of Prince Philip, Duke of Edinburgh	Royal Albert Hall, South Porch	2022	Poppy Field			
More images	Statue of Diana, Princess of Wales	Kensington Palace	2021 (unveiled)	Ian Rank-Broadley			

== See also ==
- Equestrian statue of Charles II trampling Cromwell, which formerly stood in the Stocks Market in the City of London
- King Edward VII Jewish Memorial Drinking Fountain, Whitechapel Road
- Queen Alexandra Memorial, Marlborough Gate
- Queen Elizabeth Gate, Hyde Park Corner
- Memorial to Queen Elizabeth II, London, a proposed future memorial
- Innocent Victims, a sculptural group of Diana, Princess of Wales, with Dodi Fayed, formerly in Harrods
- Statue of Oliver Cromwell, Westminster
- Statue of the Earl Mountbatten, London
- Catrin ferch Owain Glyndŵr (sculpture), Oxford Court, City of London

== Bibliography ==
- Lloyd, Fran; Potkin, Helen; Thackara, Davina (2011). Public Sculpture of Outer South and West London. Public Sculpture of Britain. Liverpool: Liverpool University Press.
- Matthews, Peter (2012). London's Statues and Monuments. Botley: Shire Publications.
- Ward-Jackson, Philip (2003). Public Sculpture of the City of London. Public Sculpture of Britain. Liverpool: Liverpool University Press.
- Ward-Jackson, Philip (2011). Public Sculpture of Historic Westminster: Volume 1. Public Sculpture of Britain. Liverpool: Liverpool University Press.
- Whinney, Margaret (1988). Sculpture in Britain 1530–1830. The Pelican History of Art. Harmondsworth: Penguin.
