= List of roads in the City of Westminster =

Roads in the City of Westminster, London, England include:

- Aldwych
- Baker Street
- Bayswater Road
- Belgrave Road
- Birdcage Walk
- Bond Street
- Broad Sanctuary
- Brook Street
- Buckingham Palace Road
- Charing Cross Road
- Constitution Hill
- Coventry Street
- Downing Street
- Drury Lane
- Grosvenor Square
- Harley Street
- Haymarket
- Horse Guards Road
- Jermyn Street
- Leicester Square
- Little George Street
- Little Sanctuary
- Long Acre
- The Mall
- Marylebone Road
- Millbank
- Northumberland Avenue
- Oxford Street
- Pall Mall
- Park Lane
- Piccadilly
- Piccadilly Circus
- Portland Place
- Prince Consort Road
- Regent Street
- Shaftesbury Avenue
- Smith Square
- Strand
- Trafalgar Square
- Victoria Embankment
- Victoria Street
- Whitehall
