= Human trafficking in Timor-Leste =

Timor-Leste (officially the Democratic Republic of Timor-Leste, formerly known as East Timor) is a destination country for women from Indonesia, the People’s Republic of China (P.R.C.), Thailand, Malaysia and the Philippines, trafficked for the purpose of commercial sexual exploitation. Timorese women and children are vulnerable to being trafficked from rural areas or from camps for internally displaced persons to Dili with lures of employment and then forced into commercial sexual exploitation. Following the re-establishment of international peacekeeping operations in 2006, several businesses suspected of involvement in sex trafficking have reopened. Widespread internal displacement, poverty, and lack of awareness of trafficking risks could lead Timor-Leste to become a source of vulnerable persons trafficked to other countries.

In 2008, the government of Timor-Leste did not fully comply with the minimum standards for the elimination of trafficking; however, it made significant efforts to do so. In 2007, the government reconvened its interagency Human Trafficking Task Force and included representatives from international organizations and civil society. The January 2 and 17, 2008 raids against two brothels fronting as bars also reflect the new government’s commitment to increase its efforts to combat trafficking.

The country ratified the 2000 UN TIP Protocol in November 2009.

The U.S. State Department's Office to Monitor and Combat Trafficking in Persons placed the country in "Tier 2" in 2023.

In 2023, the Organised Crime Index noted that there was an increase in non-skilled labourers being trafficked to Portugal.

== Sex trafficking ==
Citizen and foreign women and girls are victims of sex trafficking in Timor-Leste. They are raped and physically and psychologically harmed in brothels, hotels, homes, and other locations throughout the country.

== Prosecution (2008) ==
The government of Timor-Leste demonstrated limited anti-trafficking law enforcement efforts over the past year. Pending promulgation of a national penal code, Timor-Leste’s judicial system still relies significantly on the Indonesian penal code. The government similarly depends upon international assistance to process court cases, the backlog of which rose to over 4,000 by the end of 2007. The government also relies on international police officials for a significant share of its law enforcement effort. The Timorese police will only begin to assume independent law enforcement authority incrementally during the course of 2008.

Timor-Leste prohibits all forms of sex and labor trafficking through its 2003 Immigration and Asylum Act, which prescribes penalties for sex trafficking that are sufficiently stringent, but are not commensurate with those prescribed for rape. While there were no reported prosecutions or convictions for trafficking for labor or sexual exploitation during the last year, law enforcement operations increased. In November 2007, the government intervened to prevent a group of minors from traveling to Malaysia under circumstances that suggested trafficking. In January 2008, the United Nations Police Force (UNPOL) and the National Police of Timor-Leste (PNTL) conducted a joint raid at a Dili bar suspected of sex trafficking. They arrested 32 suspects, mainly women from the P.R.C., Indonesia, Malaysia, and Timor-Leste. The PNTL conducted a separate raid at another Dili bar, where they arrested over 87 suspects, mainly foreign women engaging in prostitution. While neither raid resulted in prosecution of traffickers, Timorese authorities also did not prosecute the victims. In both cases, the Timorese police detained and then released all suspects after 48 hours and after charging the foreign women with immigration violations because they had entered the country on tourist visas or without visas.

The Office of the Prosecutor-General dismissed cases against suspected traffickers in both cases due to the lack of witnesses. There are allegations that some police officers in Dili have accepted bribes or sex in exchange for allowing brothels with suspected trafficking victims to continue operations. There has been no official confirmation of these allegations of low-level corruption from the government, international organizations, or non-governmental organizations (NGOs).

== Protection (2008) ==
A severe lack of resources and human resources capacity constraints continued to limit the Timorese government’s ability to provide assistance to victims of trafficking during the reporting period; the government continued to rely on international organizations and NGOs for victim protection. Its law enforcement, immigration, and social services personnel do not employ formal procedures to proactively identify trafficking victims among high-risk populations, such as foreign women engaging in prostitution. Therefore, victims of trafficking may be charged with immigration violations and either deported or repatriated through a process known as “voluntary abandonment.” Under this arrangement, foreigners found in Timor-Leste without valid documentation, but thought to be trafficking victims, are given 10 days to depart the country and are provided assistance with travel documents. There is no threat of prosecution involved in the voluntary abandonment process, and there were no reports of voluntary abandonment being forced or coerced.

Several other victims were repatriated through the help of their embassies or an international organization. The Ministry of Labor assisted in arranging shelter and aid for victims of trafficking with local NGOs or international organizations when cases are brought to its attention. The government did not provide victims with legal alternatives to their removal to countries where they face hardship or retribution. Although the government encouraged victims to participate in investigations or prosecutions, it also penalized victims for unlawful acts committed as a direct result of their being trafficked.

== Prevention (2008) ==
The Government of Timor-Leste continued to rely on international organizations and NGOs for awareness raising efforts on trafficking in persons. The Human Trafficking Task Force, which includes representatives from the government, international organizations, and local NGOs, resumed meetings in August 2007, after a hiatus resulting from the 2006 crisis. A collaborative public awareness campaign by the government, international organizations, and local NGOs produced posters and leaflets targeting potential victims in Dili and throughout the districts. The leaflets provide emergency contact telephone numbers for the police and NGOs. Another campaign features senior government officials holding handcuffs and delivering an anti-trafficking message.

A two-day anti-trafficking workshop held in Dili in March 2008 for law enforcement officers, civil servants, and NGOs, highlighted ministerial level commitment to raising Timorese awareness of the problem of trafficking in persons. At the opening ceremony, the Foreign Minister emphasized that the government views border security as crucial in the fight against human trafficking. He outlined efforts by the military and the police to improve border security, and reaffirmed the commitment of the government to strengthening cooperation both inter-agency and with international partners. While modest, these steps indicate a growing commitment by the government to overcome its limited resources and reliance on international organizations and NGOs to increase public awareness.
