= Kirsty Sword Gusmão =

Australian East-Timorese activist (born 1966)

Kirsty Sword Gusmão AO
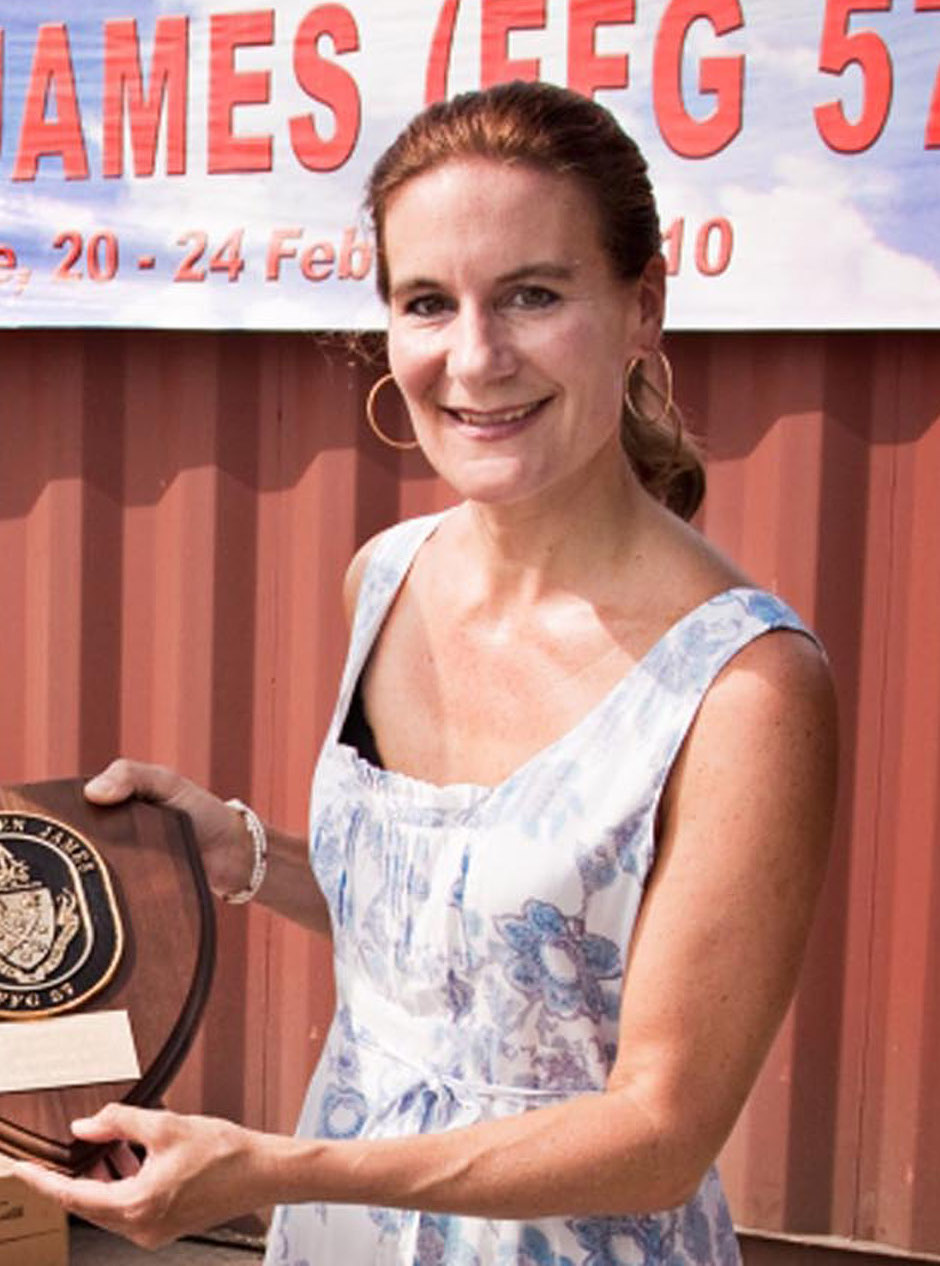
- Sword Gusmão accepting a plaque aboard the USS Reuben James (FFG-57) in 2010

First Lady of East Timor
- In role 20 May 2002 – 20 May 2007
- President: Xanana Gusmão
- Preceded by: Position established
- Succeeded by: Ana Pessoa Pinto

Spouse of the Prime Minister of East Timor
- In role 8 August 2007 – 16 February 2015
- Prime Minister: Xanana Gusmão
- Succeeded by: Teresa António Madeira Soares

Personal details
- Born: Kirsty Sword; 19 April 1966 (age 60) Melbourne, Victoria, Australia
- Spouse: Xanana Gusmão (m. 2000; sep. 2015)
- Children: 3 sons
- Parent(s): Brian Sword and Rosalie Sword
- Education: Eaglehawk Primary; Golden Square Secondary
- Alma mater: University of Melbourne (BA Hons); Monash University (DipEd); Victoria University (DUniv)
- Occupation: Administrative secretary, teacher, researcher, interpreter, political activist
- Known for: First Lady of East Timor
- Awards: Officer of the Order of Australia

Kirsty Sword Gusmão, AO (born Kirsty Sword; 19 April 1966) is an Australian-East Timorese activist who served as the First Lady of East Timor from 2002 until 2007. She was married to Xanana Gusmão, former prime minister and president of East Timor, though they separated in 2015. She is the founding director of the Alola Foundation, which seeks to improve the lives of women in Timor-Leste, a nation with one of the world's lowest per capita GDPs.

== Early years and education ==
Sword was born in 1966 in Melbourne, Australia, to schoolteachers Brian and Rosalie Sword, and was raised there and in Bendigo. She attended Eaglehawk Primary School, where her father was the principal and her mother a music teacher in the 1970s. She was taught her first Indonesian words by her father when she was four years old. She was a promising ballet dancer, but decided not to pursue it as a career. As a teen, Sword travelled to Bali and Jakarta with her father and brother. After Golden Square Secondary College, she attended Monash University and the University of Melbourne in the 1980s where she completed a Bachelor of Arts (Honours) degree, majoring in Indonesian and Italian, and a Diploma of Education. In 1985, while studying Indonesian at Monash, Sword met Timor-Leste students and took up their struggle for independence. Her father Brian died in 1998.

== Career ==
Sword worked as an administrative secretary with the Overseas Service Bureau (now Australian Volunteers International) until 1991, when she joined the Refugee Studies Program at Oxford University in England as assistant to the development coordinator. Later that year, she travelled to East Timor as a researcher and interpreter for a Yorkshire Television documentary film called In Cold Blood: The massacre of East Timor about political and social developments in the territory.

From 1992 to 1996, Sword lived and worked in Jakarta, Indonesia, as an English teacher, humanitarian aid worker and human rights campaigner. At the same time, she became a clandestine activist and spy for the Timor-Leste (East Timorese) resistance to Indonesian rule. Her resistance code name was Ruby Blade, later changed to Mukya (lit. 'fragrant') by Xanana Gusmão.

Regarding the eventual media revelation that a member of a supposedly neutral organisation was spying against a host country, whether any lasting damage was done to the capacity of humanitarian aid and human rights organisations to work freely in Indonesia is difficult to assess, as none of the relevant agencies have been willing to make official statements; however, there was criticism of her public admission to – rather than the actions themselves – clandestine activities. Writing in 2002 in a Sunday Telegraph article, Maree Curtis said that following the disclosures, critics pointed to possible risks to other aid workers "around the world who are already viewed with suspicion by jittery foreign regimes". Sword rejected criticism of the ethics of her actions, stating that the agency that employed her was fully aware of her activities, and that as a contractor to the Overseas Service Bureau neither she nor the NGO were in breach of any codes. Sword was quoted as saying: "I was simply an individual who was concerned and acting on her conscience."

== From resistance activist to First Lady ==
Sword finally met Xanana Gusmão face to face in December 1994 while he was serving a 20-year sentence in Jakarta's Cipinang prison for leading the East Timorese resistance group FRETILIN. Their first contact came when she taught him English by correspondence from 1992. Ultimately she bluffed her way into the prison at Christmas 1994 on the pretence of visiting an uncle.

Xanana was released in 1999 and the couple married the following year in Dili, where they lived in the independent Timor-Leste with their three sons. In 2001 Sword Gusmão brought the case of sex trafficking victim Juliana dos Santos to the attention of the United Nations Commission on Human Rights, as well as starting the Alola Foundation. From May 2002 to May 2007, Xanana was President of Timor-Leste and Sword Gusmão was its First Lady. On 1 November 2003, she published an autobiography entitled A Woman of Independence.

During the 2006 East Timorese crisis, Sword Gusmão conducted media interviews and met Australian troops on behalf of her husband, who was immobile due to back pain. In May 2007, Xanana declined to run for another term as President, and was succeeded by his prime minister, José Ramos-Horta, Xanana became Prime Minister on 8 August. In October, Sword Gusmão was appointed to the honorary position of Goodwill Ambassador for Education of Timor-Leste by Ramos-Horta.

On 11 February 2008, national television reported that the motorcade of Gusmão had come under gunfire one hour after President Ramos-Horta was shot in the stomach; according to the Associated Press, the two incidents raised the possibility of a coup attempt. During the assassination attempts, Sword Gusmão was protecting her children from gunmen stalking their home. Also being sheltered was another woman and her four children, upon contacting Xanana by mobile phone Sword Gusmão heard he was under gunfire. The Gusmão family were reunited after negotiations between her guards and the gunmen allowed her through and, despite the risks of future attempts, Sword Gusmão decided to remain in Timor-Leste.

== Personal life ==
In early 2013 it was reported that Sword Gusmão had undergone treatment for breast cancer.

After 15 years of marriage, it was announced in March 2015 that Sword Gusmão and her husband were separating. She now lives in Melbourne with the couple's three sons.

== Awards ==
On 14 May 2014, Sword Gusmão was admitted to the degree of Doctor of the University (honoris causa) by Victoria University for her community service in championing the importance of education and improving the lives of women and children in Timor-Leste.

In June 2015, Sword Gusmão was appointed an Officer of the Order of Australia (AO) "For distinguished service to Australia-Timor-Leste relations through the development of mutual cooperation and understanding, particularly in the education sector, and as an advocate for improved health and living conditions for the Timorese people."
