= Crusoe College =

Coordinates: 36°47′15.7″S 144°14′04.2″E

- Kangaroo Flat, Victoria; Australia

Information
- Former names: Kangaroo Flat Secondary College; Kangaroo Flat Technical School
- Type: Secondary college
- Principal: Simon Wood
- Enrolment: 820
- Colours: Green, yellow and red.
- Feeder to: Bendigo Senior Secondary College
- Website: http://www.crusoecollege.vic.edu.au/

Crusoe College is a public secondary school in Kangaroo Flat, Bendigo, Australia. It is one of four colleges built in line with the Bendigo Education Plan.

The School has had many name changes over its existence. The college was established as Kangaroo Flat Technical School, later becoming Kangaroo Flat Secondary College.

It was proposed to be known as Bendigo South West Secondary College until deciding on an official name in late 2008.

== Buildings ==
The school has a gymnasium, music centre, performing arts hall and the JB Osbourne Theatre. The theatre is used for local productions and award ceremonies by many local groups and schools.

The current classroom buildings were built to replace the aging classroom buildings as part of the Bendigo Education Plan between 2009 and 2010. During the building works, the old buildings remained in place to allow normal classes to continue. Once the campus was completed, the old buildings were demolished to then construct the schools oval and sporting fields.

The JB Osborne Theatre was built in the late 1970s, opening in 1978. The theatre has a seated capacity of 382 patrons. The theater is named after the Second Principal of the College.

== See also ==
- Bendigo South East Secondary College
- Eaglehawk Secondary College
- Weeroona College Bendigo
- Golden Square Secondary College
- Bendigo Senior Secondary College
