= Juliana dos Santos =

Juliana dos Santos is an East Timorese young woman who was kidnapped in 1999 by the Laksaur militia following the 1999 East Timorese independence referendum. Her case became the focus of concern for activist Kirsty Sword Gusmão who subsequently brought the case to the attention of the United Nations Commission on Human Rights.

In 1999 Santos was kidnapped by Igidio Mnanek, the leader of the Laksaur (pro-Indonesian) militia. Santos was a minor who was raped and gave birth to at least one child while being held captive, first in West Timor and then East Timor. Her case came to the attention of Kirsty Sword Gusmão, a human rights campaigner who became the First Lady of East Timor in 2002 when her husband Xanana Gusmão became the first President. Sword Gusmão worked to bring attention to sex trafficking in East Timor in general and Santos' case in particular. In 2001 Sword Gusmão brought Santos' case to the U.N. Commission on Human Rights, and started the Alola Foundation in 2001.
