= Statue of William III =

Statue of William III may refer to:

- Equestrian statue of William III, Bristol
- Equestrian statue of William III, Glasgow
- Equestrian statue of William III, Kingston upon Hull
- Equestrian statue of William III, London
- Equestrian statue of William III, Petersfield
- Statue of William III, Brixham
- Statue of William III, Kensington Palace
