= Frank Milne =

Australian-Canadian economist (born 1946)

- Born: 1946 (age 79–80)
- Citizenship: Australian; Canadian
- Years active: 1975–present

Frank Milne (born 1946) is an Australian and Canadian economist and financial theorist. He is currently BMO Professor of Economics and Finance in the Economics Dept., Queen's University, Canada.

Milne's research interests and contributions have included different topics within the financial field such as analysis of financial stability in banking systems; financial risk management systems; and the analysis of corporate and non-profit governance structures.

== Early life ==
Milne was born in Bendigo, Victoria in 1946. He went to Bendigo High School and studied economics at Monash University, receiving a B.Econ (Hons) in 1968, and a M.Econ in 1970. He received his PhD at the Australian National University in 1975, where he taught in the Department of Economics for many years, latterly as Reader in Economics.

== Career ==
He has held academic positions at the University of Rochester, and the Australian National University, and has lectured at Stanford University, the University of Chicago, London School of Economics, University of Heidelberg, University of Paris, and many other universities around the world. He has consulted widely in the private and public sectors in Australia, Canada and the U.K. He has been a consultant at the Bank of England; and in 2008 and 2009 was a Special Advisor to the Bank of Canada.
