= Little Sanctuary =

Street in London, England

Coordinates: 51.5007°N 0.12789°W

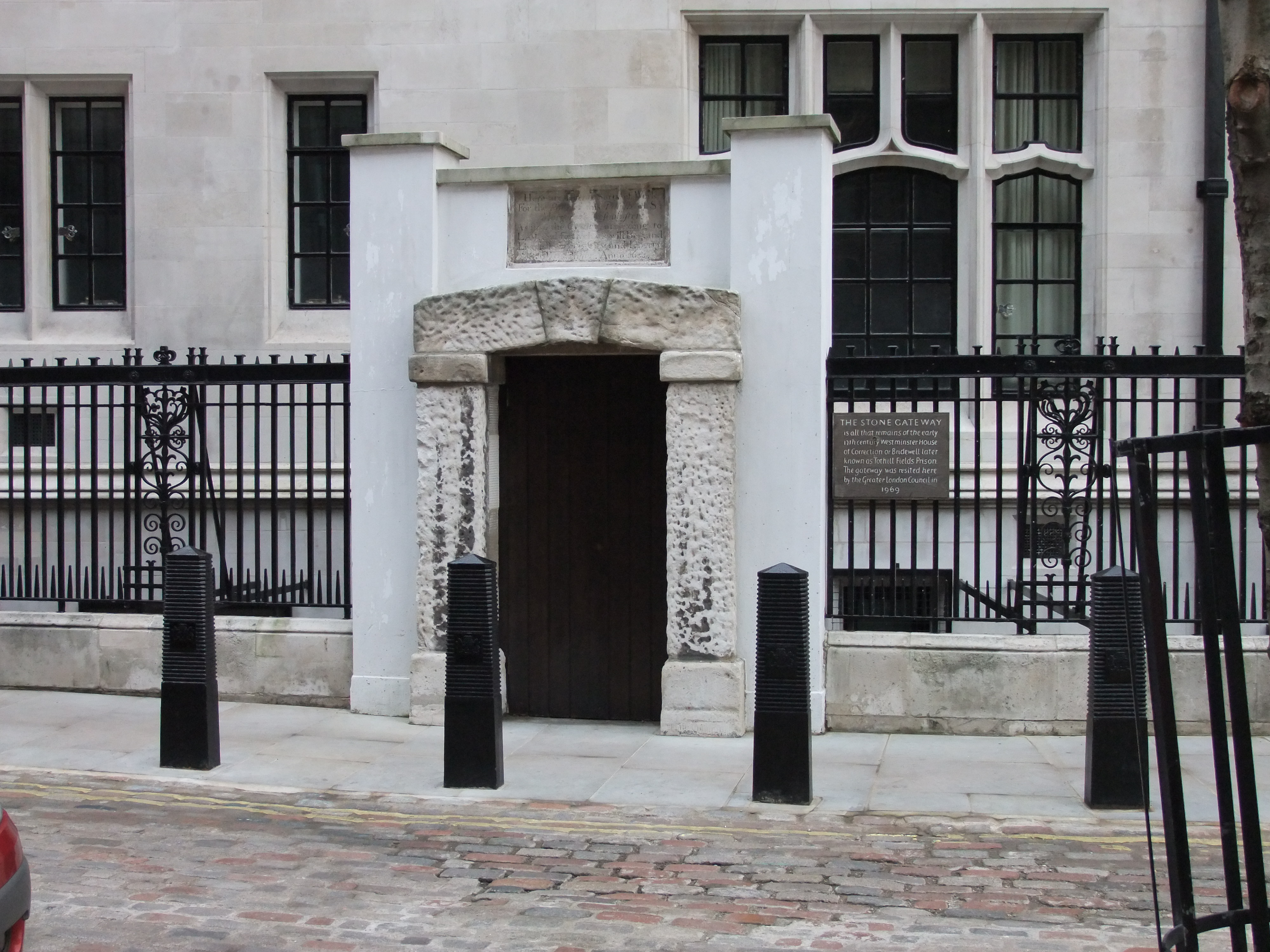
The Stone gateway to Westminster House of Correction at Little Sanctuary

Little Sanctuary is a street in Westminster, London, leading from Little George Street to Broad Sanctuary in the vicinity of Parliament Square. The street measures approximately 75 metres long.

== History ==
In the 14th century, Edward III of England built a belfry at Little Sanctuary. The Three Tuns Tavern stood on the street and dated from ancient times.

Historically Little Sanctuary was home to Tothill Fields Bridewell Prison. A 17th century stone gateway that is the only thing that survives from the prison exterior.

Today the street runs to the rear of Middlesex Guildhall. The building was constructed in 1808.
