= Queen Elizabeth II Centre =

Conference centre in Westminster, London

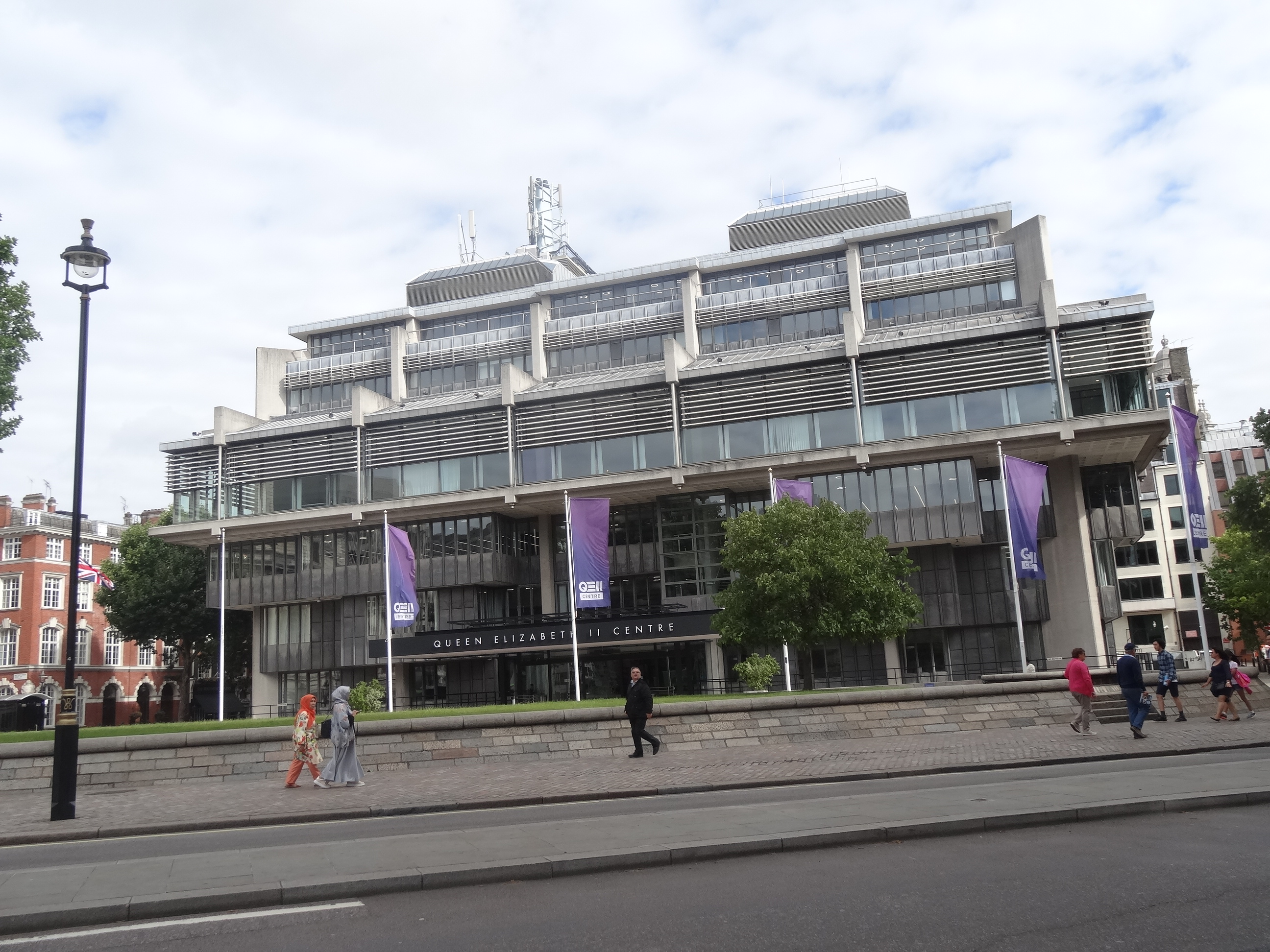

Agency overview
- Jurisdiction: United Kingdom
- Headquarters: Broad Sanctuary, Westminster, London; 51.5005°N 0.129°W
- Minister responsible: Steve Reed, Secretary of State for Housing, Communities and Local Government
- Agency executive: Safraj Ismail, chief executive officer
- Parent agency: Ministry of Housing, Communities and Local Government
- Website: qeiicentre.london

The Queen Elizabeth II Centre is a government-owned conference facility located in the City of Westminster, London, close to the Houses of Parliament, Westminster Abbey, Central Hall Westminster and Parliament Square. It was opened by Queen Elizabeth II in 1986 and can host conferences and exhibitions for up to 1,300 delegates.

== History ==
The site now occupied by the Queen Elizabeth II Centre was previously occupied by several buildings. At the northern end of the site were the headquarters of the Stationery Office, which had originally been the "Parliamentary Mews" built in 1825 by Decimus Burton and converted from 1853 to 1855. The southern side was occupied by the Westminster Hospital, built by W & H W Inwood from 1831 to 1834, and expanded later that century and again in 1924. The previous buildings became surplus to requirements in 1950 and were demolished; designs were drawn up by Thomas S. Tait for building a new Colonial Office on the site; however only the foundations had been built by the time progress was halted in 1952.

== Design ==
In 1958, it was decided that there would be an open space on the southern edge of the site by Broad Sanctuary, and an architectural competition for a conference hall and government offices was held in 1961. The competition was won by William Whitfield, but the scheme was not executed due to the plans for redeveloping Whitehall drawn up by Leslie Martin in 1965. The site remained in limbo until a feasibility study for the conference centre was drawn up in 1975. The centre as eventually built was designed by Powell Moya & Partners and constructed by Bovis Construction with work starting in 1981; it was opened by Queen Elizabeth II in 1986.

== Operation ==
The centre is owned by HM Government and its operation is conducted by an executive agency of the Ministry of Housing, Communities and Local Government. The centre's chief executive is Saf Ismail, who took over from Mark Taylor in October 2025. The centre has 32 versatile "empty box"-style rooms which are suitable for a range of events, specialising in events for between 40 and 1,300 delegates. It also has 2,000 m^{2} (22,000 sq ft) of exhibition space. The centre is a successful venue hosting over 400 meetings each year and returning an annual dividend to the Exchequer, thus not reliant on the taxpayer for financial support.

== See also ==
- Alexandra Palace
- The Business Design Centre
- The ExCeL Exhibition Centre
- Olympia, London
