= Golden Square Secondary College =

Coordinates: 36°46′50″S 144°15′30″E

Golden Square High School in the city of Bendigo in the state of Victoria, Australia, was established in temporary accommodation at Camp Hill Primary School in central Bendigo in 1960. With the completion of the new school's buildings, it moved to 50 MacDougall Road in the Bendigo suburb of Golden Square in 1962, providing for forms 1 to 6, now known as years 7 to 12.

In 1978 it became a 7–10 school and was one of the original feeder schools to Bendigo Senior High School. In 1986, a Hearing Impaired Unit was established and in 1990 it underwent a name change to become Golden Square Secondary College.

The college catered for students from a range of backgrounds, drawn from around 30 urban and rural primary schools.

Former students of the school include Bendigo West MP Bob Cameron; AFL and Richmond footballer Wayne Campbell; VFL and Carlton footballer Rod Ashman; First Lady of East Timor Kirsty Sword Gusmão; Australian Armed Forces Brigadier James Simpson; Software Developer Brendan Sheehan (student 2006 to 2008); journalist Adrian Lowe of the Melbourne daily newspaper The Age; Anglican Bishop of Bendigo Andrew Curnow (2003–2017); and water skiing champion Kaye Thurlow.

The Golden Square Secondary College campus closed on 28 November 2008. It merged with Kangaroo Flat and Flora Hill secondary colleges as part of the implementation of the Bendigo Education Plan. Its buildings were demolished.

In 2022 it was announced by the Victorian State Government that the site would be officially handed over to the Dja Dja Wurrung Clans Aboriginal Corporation to begin building the Dja Dja Wurrung Corporate and Community Centre.

== Merger and closure ==
The Golden Square Secondary College campus closed on 28 November 2008 with its students and teachers merging with Crusoe College and Bendigo South East College as a result of the implementation of the Bendigo Education Plan. Its buildings were demolished with the exception of the Gymnasium.

New schools were built on the existing Kangaroo Flat and Flora Hill secondary colleges’ sites, at 57-75 Olympic Parade, Kangaroo Flat and 56–64 Ellis St, Flora Hill respectively.

With the merger, the Kangaroo Flat Secondary College underwent a major upgrade, and a name change to Crusoe College in 2008. Since it opened in 1962 it has also been the Kangaroo Flat Technical School and the Bendigo South West Secondary College.

The former Flora Hill Secondary College was renamed Bendigo South East College. Since its establishment in 1916, the school has also been known variously as the Bendigo School of Domestic Arts (housed in the original Quarry Hill State (Primary) School), Bendigo Girls School, Flora Hill Girls School, Flora Hill High School and Flora Hill Secondary School).

== See also ==
- Bendigo South East Secondary College
- Eaglehawk Secondary College
- Weeroona College
- Crusoe Secondary College
- Bendigo Senior Secondary College
