= Tothill Fields Bridewell =

Prison in London, England, 1618 to 1884

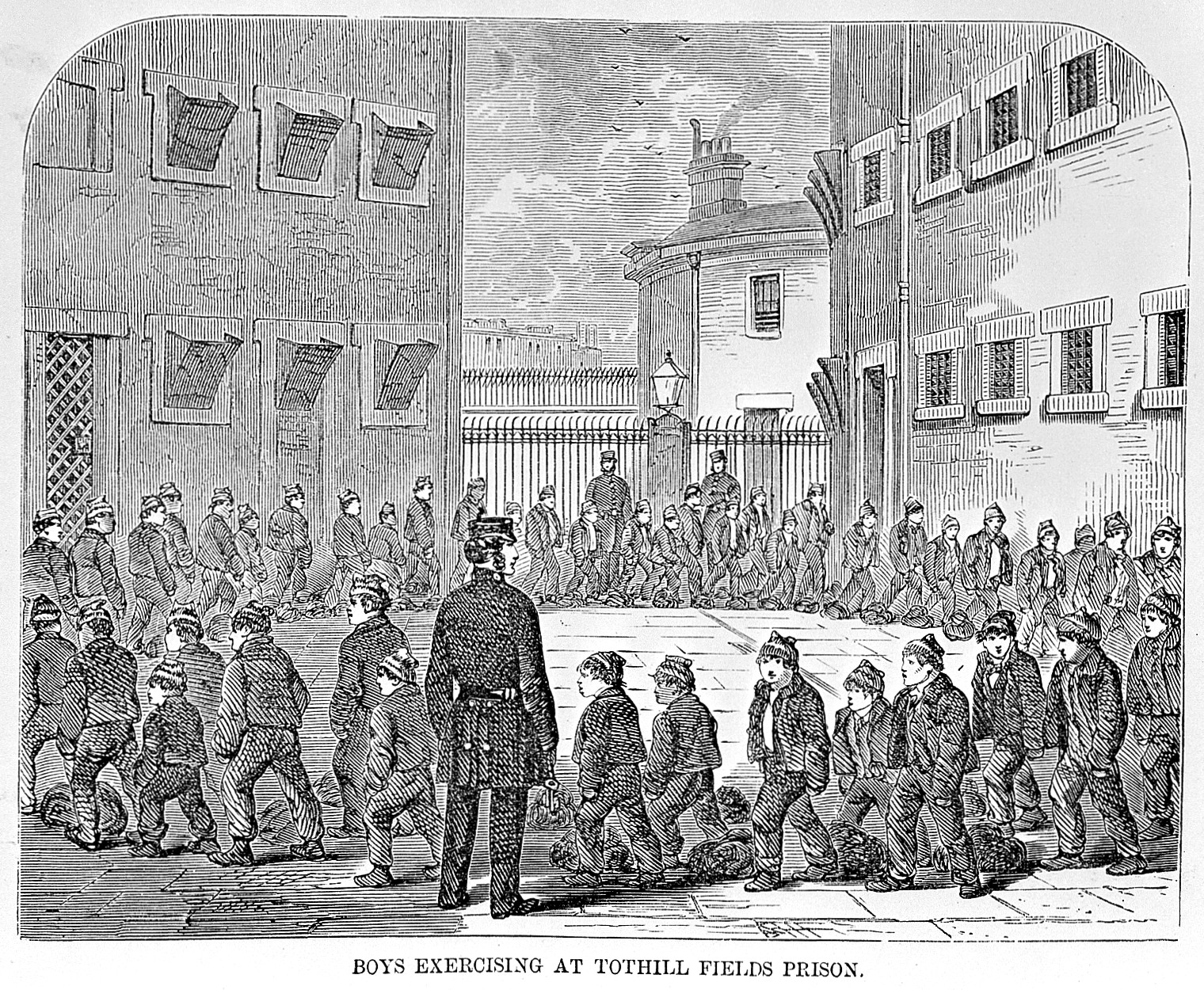
- Boys exercising at Tothill Fields Prison
- Interactive map of Tothill Fields Bridewell
- Location: Little Sanctuary, London; 51°29′46″N 0°08′23″W
- Status: Closed
- Opened: 1791
- Closed: 1853

Notable prisoners
- Edward Marcus Despard; Gregor MacGregor; James Tilly Matthews; John Trumbull; Samuel Drybutter

Tothill Fields Bridewell (also known as Tothill Fields Prison and Westminster Bridewell) was a prison located in the Westminster area of central London between 1618 and 1884. It was named "Bridewell" after the Bridewell Palace, which during the 16th century had become one of the City of London's most important prisons. Tothill Fields later became the Westminster House of Correction.

== History ==
Like its City counterpart, the Westminster Bridewell was intended as a "house of correction" for the compulsory employment of able-bodied but indolent paupers. Built in 1618, it was enlarged in 1655, and during the reign of Queen Anne, its regime was extended to cover the incarceration of criminals.

In 1834 the original Bridewell was replaced by a larger prison, on a different site, 8 acres (32,000 m^{2}) in area, south of Victoria Street and close to Vauxhall Bridge Road. The new prison, designed by Robert Abraham and costing £186,000, was circular in plan (following Jeremy Bentham's "panopticon"), so that warders could supervise prisoners from a central point, and had a capacity of 900 prisoners. After it was completed, the old prison was demolished. At the back of Middlesex Guildhall in Little Sanctuary is the 17th-century "Stone Gateway", positioned there by the Greater London Council in 1969. This is the only visible remnant of the prison.

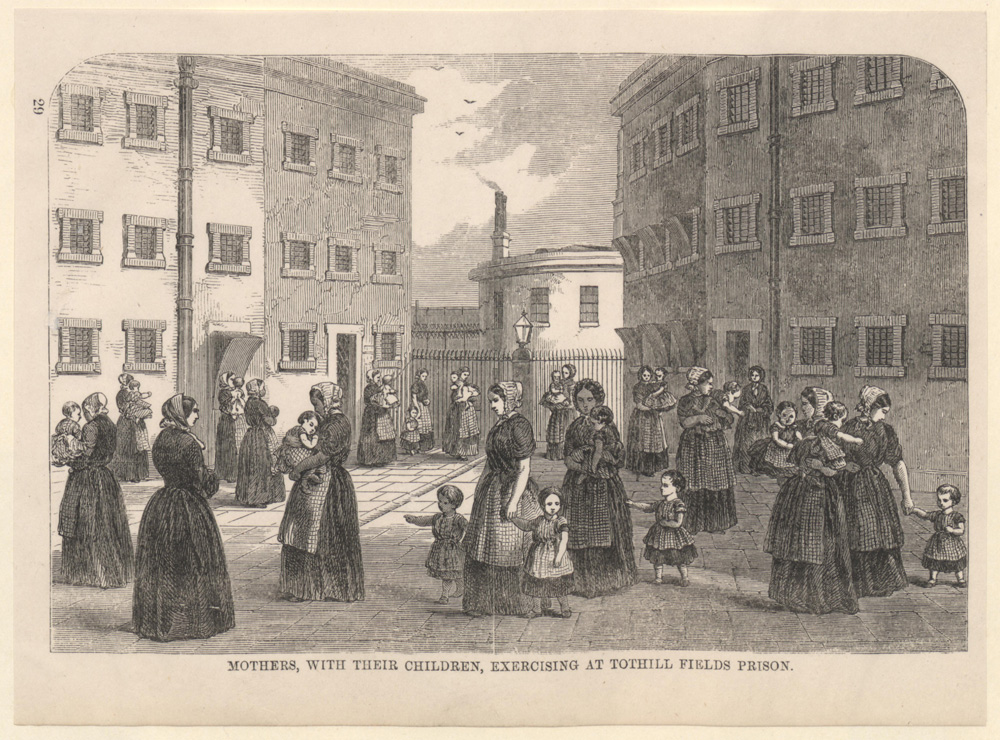
Mothers with their children, exercising at Tothill Fields Prison in the 1860s

Originally the Bridewell comprised three separate gaols for untried male prisoners and debtors, male convicts, and women. Inmates were put to work oakum-picking and treading the treadmill, and it operated on the silent/separate system. However, due to poor management, the regime was changed in 1850 and the Bridewell then housed only women and convicted boys under the age of seventeen.

The second prison was closed in 1877, when prisoners were transferred to Millbank Prison, and was demolished in 1885. Westminster Cathedral, started in 1895, now stands on the site. The prison's foundations were re-used for the cathedral.

== Notable inmates ==
- Edward Despard, convicted of high treason
- Gregor MacGregor, accused of fraud by means of the Poyais emigration program.
- James Tilly Matthews, apparently insane
- John Trumbull, for alleged treason (1780–1781)
- Samuel Drybutter, for attempted sodomy (1770–1771)
- Ernest Charles Jones, Chartist leader (c.1860)
