= Golden Square Shopping Centre =

Coordinates: 53.3890764°N 2.5948354°W

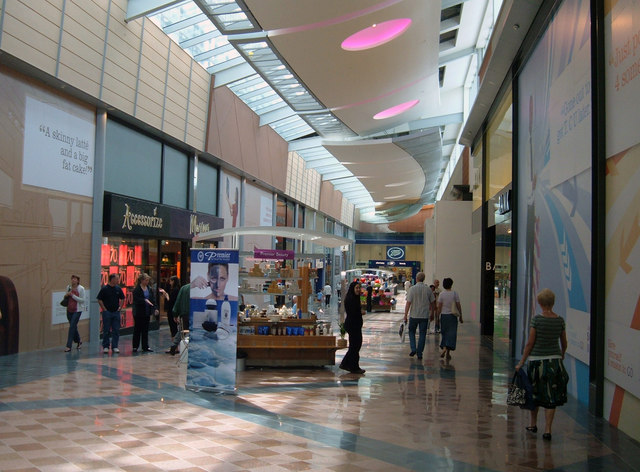
- Golden Square in 2007
- Location: Warrington, Cheshire; United Kingdom
- Opened: 1974
- Renovated: 2007
- Owner: Adhan Group
- Num. of stores: 133
- Floor area: 675,000 sq ft
- Public transit: Warrington Interchange
- Website: https://gswarrington.com/

Golden Square Shopping Centre is a shopping centre in Warrington, England. It is the town's main shopping centre. Golden Square first opened in 1974, and included a Marks & Spencer store. The mall has 675,000 square feet (63,000 sq m) of floor space and 133 units.

The name of the mall comes from a historic map of the area which referred to a property on the site owned by a man with the surname Goulden. In November 1979, Elizabeth II and her husband Prince Philip visited the shopping centre.

The mall was redeveloped in 2007, with new retailers such as Oasis and H&M. The £120 million redevelopment added 60 new stores and 365,000 square feet of floor space, anchored by a 115,000 square foot Debenhams department store. The extension of the 28-year-old shopping centre was the work of the Warrington Retail Limited Partnership, a partnership of Lend Lease Retail, Legal and General Property and a client of Arlington Investors.

LaSalle Investment Management acquired Golden Square on behalf of the Alaskan State Pension Fund for £141m in 2014. In 2023, Adhan Group completed its acquisition of the shopping centre, taking over the 250-year leasehold from the pension fund. Other notable tenants include Next, River Island, TK Maxx, Iceland and New Look.

Golden Square is connected to Warrington's main bus interchange, which was added during the 2007 redevelopment. The mall is located near Warrington Central railway station.
