= Bendigo Senior Secondary College =

- Official logo

Location
- Bendigo, Victoria; Australia; 36.7553°S 144.281°E

Information
- Former name: Bendigo Continuation School (1907–1912); Bendigo High School (1912–1984); Bendigo Senior High School (1984–1989)
- Type: Government-funded secondary
- Motto: Latin: Qui Patitur Vincit (Translation: "Who perseveres conquers")
- Established: 1907
- Principal: Kylie Hand
- Teaching staff: 144
- Years: 11–12
- Enrollment: 1756 (as of 2019)
- Campuses: 2
- Website: www.bssc.edu.au

Bendigo Senior Secondary College (BSSC) (Note: Bendigo Senior Secondary College was previously known under four names: Bendigo Continuation School (1907–1912), Bendigo High School (1912–1984), and Bendigo Senior High School (1984–1989).) is an Australian government-funded co-educational secondary school for Year 11 and Year 12 students located in the centre of Bendigo, Victoria. It is the largest provider of VCE, VCE Vocational Major and VET in the state of Victoria.

Bendigo has four government-funded Year 7 to 10 secondary schools: Eaglehawk Secondary College, Bendigo South East College, Crusoe College and Weeroona College Bendigo. Students from these schools transition to BSSC for their final two years of schooling in Years 11 and 12.

== History ==
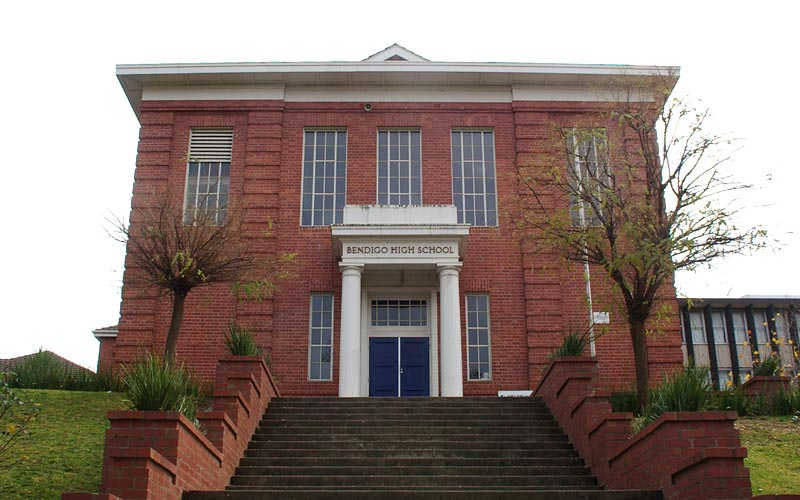
Administration building of Bendigo Senior Secondary College

The Bendigo Continuation School opened on 27 April 1907, with the aim of preparing students for entry into the public service, teacher training, university or other education. In 1912, the school was renamed as Bendigo High School. The school incorporated nearby buildings such as the Sandhurst Corporate High School (later St Andrew's College) and eventually the James King Hall and administration block were built in 1930. The former Bendigo Supreme Court was used to serve as the music rooms when it was obtained in 1959, after the relocation of Bendigo Girls' High School. Other additions include the Alexander Wing (1967) and the Commonwealth Library (1977).

The last year Bendigo High School provided the full range of secondary school courses from Years 7 to 12 was in 1975. In 1976, the school became Victoria's first senior high school providing courses in only Year 11 and Year 12. The school phased in this change with the removal of the lower years which was complete in 1979. In 1984, the school was renamed as Bendigo Senior High School. In 1990, the school was renamed as Bendigo Senior Secondary College.

In 1991, a building program saw the construction of new buildings, with an overall upgrade all of the facilities starting from 1995. The site is listed on the Victorian Heritage Register.

In 2025, the school appointed its first female principal, Kylie Hand. Hand replaced former principal Dale Pearce, the longest-serving principal of the college, who held the position since 2006.

== Notable achievements and projects ==
In 2001, Bendigo Senior Secondary College was the first government school in the world to be accredited with the Council of International Schools. In 2011, BSSC was bench-marked again and welcomed international scrutiny.

NETschool is an extension of BSSC and offers VCE and VET. It provides curriculum access for 15–18 year-old students who have been outside mainstream schooling or training.

BSSC also runs an online program which they deliver the college program through. It was set up to help students in other schools in Victoria. This program is expected to continue to expand in the future.

== Notable alumni ==
Business

- Frank Milne (born 1946), economist and finance theorist

Politics

- Nicola Rosenblum, former High Commissioner to Brunei (2016–2020) and the youngest head of mission to date
- Jim Short (born James Robert Short, 1936), Federal Liberal MP and Assistant Treasurer to the Howard government
- Mary Doyle (born 1970), Federal Labor MP for the Division of Aston

Sport

- Mark Alvey (born 1980), former AFL footballer for Western Bulldogs (1998-2003) and Essendon (2004-2005)
- Glenn Ashby (born 1977), Champion sailer for Australia and New Zealand (17x World Champion) and Australian Sailing Hall of Fame (2025).
- Jack Ginnivan (born 2002), AFL footballer for Hawthorn (2024-), previously played for Collingwood (2021-2023)
- Ben McGlynn (born 1985), former AFL footballer for Hawthorn (2006–2009) and Sydney (2010–2016), assistant coach at St Kilda (2016–present)
- Kobe Mutch (born 1998), former AFL footballer for Essendon (2017–2020)
- Scott Selwood (born 1990), former AFL footballer for Geelong (2008–2015) and West Coast (2016–2019)
- Dean Solomon (born 1980), former AFL footballer for Essendon (1998–2006) and Fremantle (2007–2009)
- Chris Tarrant (born 1980), former AFL footballer for Collingwood (1998–2006; 2011–2012) and Fremantle (2007–2010)
- Jeff Tho (born Jeffery Tho, 1988), Australian representative at the 2010 and 2014 Commonwealth Games in badminton
- Glenn Warfe (born 1984), Australian representative to the 2012 Olympic Games in badminton
- Nick Dal Santo (born 1984), former AFL footballer for St Kilda (2002–2013) and North Melbourne (2014–2016), senior coach of St Kilda's AFL Women's team (2022 (S6)-).
- Jesse Oviss (born 2006), speed cuber (13 categories), Victorian competitor at Australian Nationals (2024, 2026).
- Aaron Blabey (born 1974) actor and author of children's books including Pig the Pug (2014) and Bad Guys (2015)

== Buildings ==
- James King Hall – Started in 1929 and completed in 1930. The building was named after Headmaster James King who served between September 1907 to the end of 1923.
- Ron Lake Building – Opened in 1994. The current building stands on the ground where the caretaker residence used to be, which had a tennis court and playing ground.
- Supreme Court – Started in 1858 and used to 1896. Then turned into Bendigo Continuation School in 1907 until 1912. Then Bendigo Teachers College in 1929 until 1958. Then in 1959 it became part of Bendigo High School / Bendigo Senior Secondary College.
- The Police Barracks – Completed in 1860 and served until 1920. From 1941, it was used by Bendigo High School as an Art Room until 1967. In 1999, it was refurbished and leased to Bendigo Senior Secondary College.
- Old Gold Quadrangle – Original School Building completed in 1870 and new additions completed in 1914. The Quadrangle was used for school assemblies for many years.
- Alexander Wing – Opened in 1967 in celebration of the school's diamond jubilee and was named after former student and principal Charles Alexander. It was later renovated in 2017 to include a new VCAL centre, library, classrooms and study areas.
- The Commonwealth Science Building – Opened 1977 with help from the Commonwealth science grant. The ground floor originally had 2 science rooms. It was extended in 1996 to house the library, the first floor housed the library from 1977 until 1996 when it was converted to the multimedia centre. In 2018 the ground floor was renovated into 4 new classrooms, study area, and renamed to the Business Center.

== Landmarks ==
- King Memorial Gates – erected in 1933. Erected in memory of James King with the inscription Non Omnis Moriar ("I Shall Not Wholly Die"). This was the main entrance of the school until 1957.
- Memorial Gates and Memorial Steps – started 1956 and completed 1957. It was built as a war memorial to "those members of the school who served and suffered that our way of life might be preserved".

== Awards and nominations ==
=== Australian Training Awards ===
School Pathways to VET Awards

Year	Nominee / work	Award	Result	Ref.
2011	Bendigo Senior Secondary College	School Pathways to VET Award	Finalist	
2014	Bendigo Senior Secondary College	School Pathways to VET Award	Finalist	
2015	Bendigo Senior Secondary College	School Pathways to VET Award	Finalist	

VET in Schools Excellence Awards

Year	Nominee / work	Award	Result	Ref.
2012	Bendigo Senior Secondary College	VET in Schools Excellence Award	Won	
2016	Bendigo Senior Secondary College	VET in Schools Excellence Award	Won	

== See also ==
- Bendigo South East College
- Crusoe College
- Weeroona College Bendigo
- List of schools in Victoria
