= Westminster Scholars War Memorial =

1861 war memorial in Westminster, London

Coordinates: 51°29′58″N 0°07′45″W

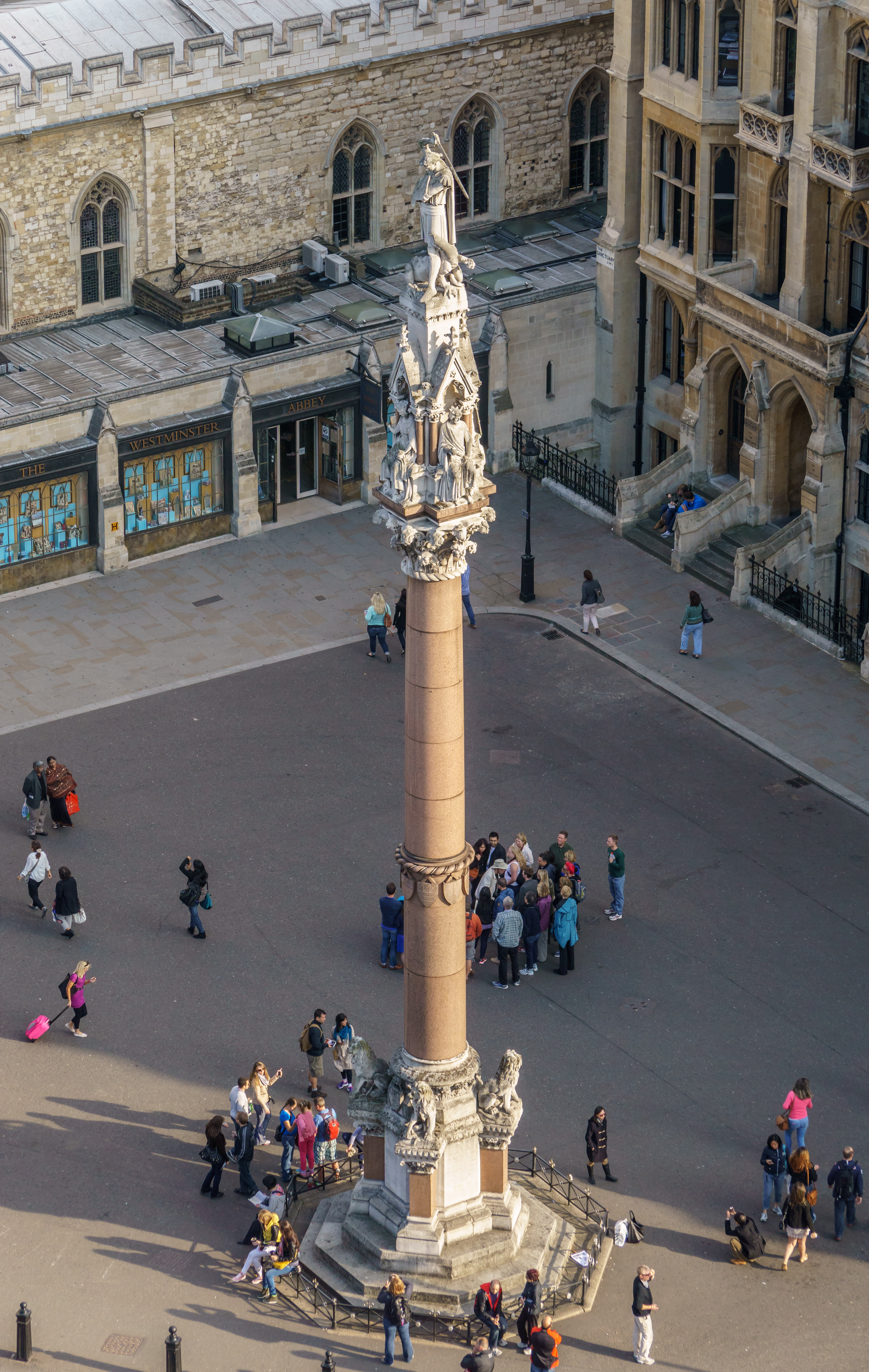
- The memorial, viewed from the dome on Methodist Central Hall, in 2014
- Interactive map of Westminster Scholars War Memorial
- Location: London
- Designer: George Gilbert Scott
- Opening date: 1861

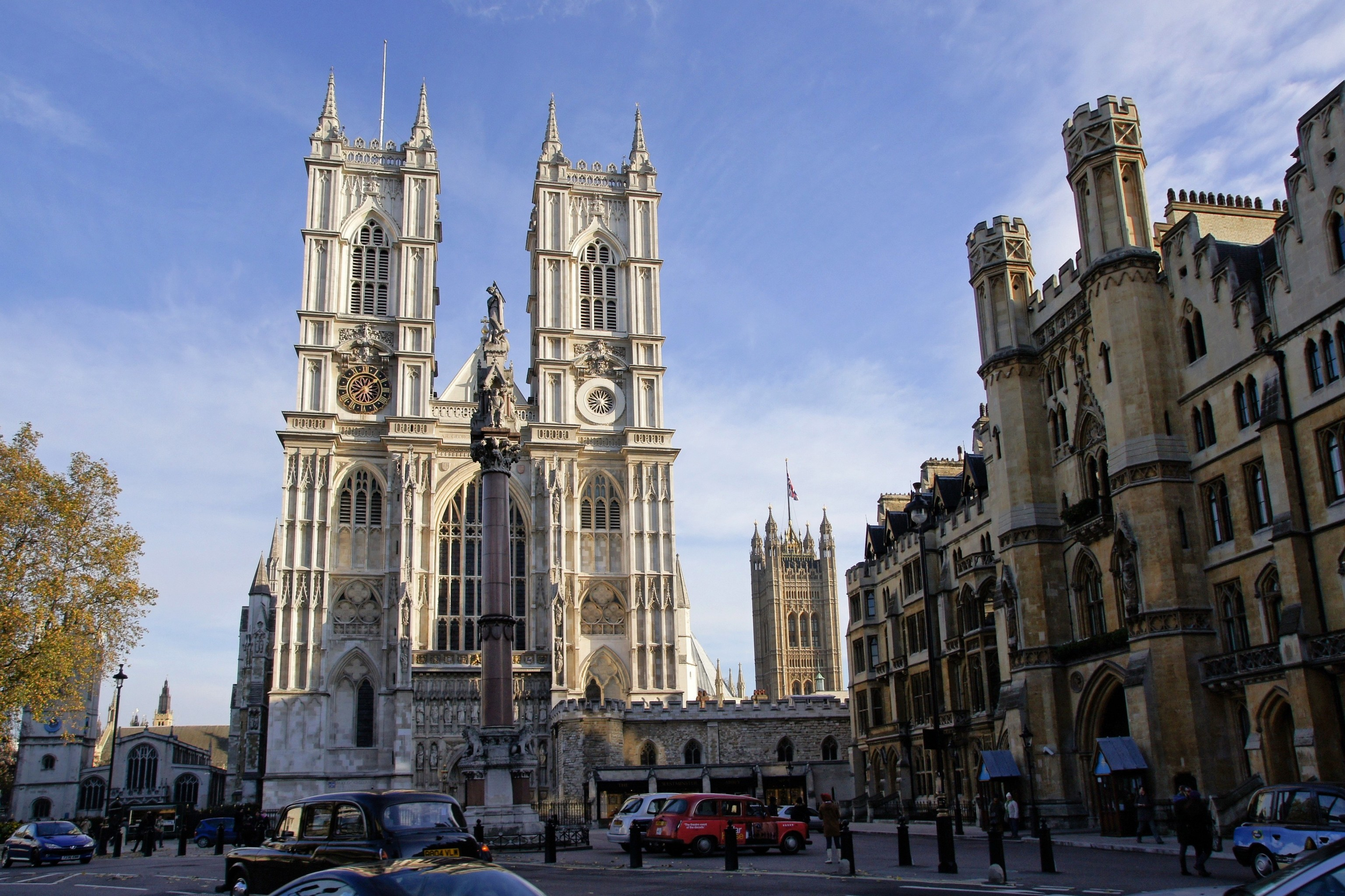
Memorial in the angle between the west entrance to Westminster Abbey, and the gatehouse leading to Dean's Yard

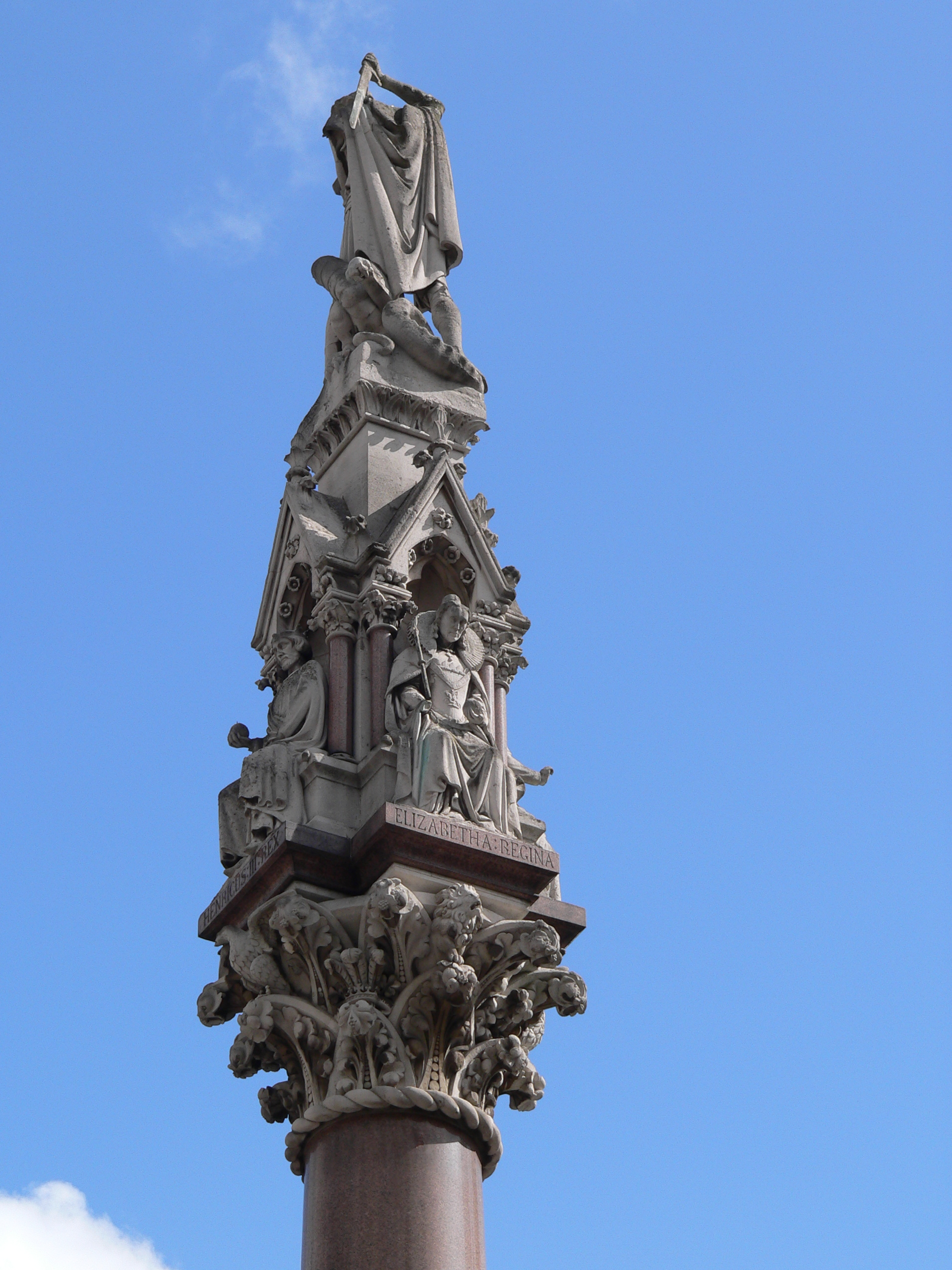
Detail of the floral capital, statues of Henry III and Elizabeth I, and the rear of St George and the dragon

The Westminster Scholars War Memorial, also known as the Crimea and Indian Mutiny Memorial, is an 1861 memorial in Westminster, London. It commemorates 19 former pupils of Westminster School who died in two wars: ten in the Crimean War of 1854–1856, and nine in the Indian Mutiny of 1857–1858. It was designed in High Victorian Gothic style by George Gilbert Scott, who was Surveyor of the Fabric of Westminster Abbey from 1849 to 1878.

The memorial is installed on a triangular plot outside the west entrance to Westminster Abbey, and north of the gatehouse leading to Dean's Yard. It stands near where Broad Sanctuary to the north becomes Victoria Street to the west, with a short road The Sanctuary running to the south and east.

It became a Grade II listed building in 1958. Westminster Abbey and the Dean's Yard gatehouse (also designed by Scott in Gothic style, and constructed in 1853–1854) are each separately listed, at Grade I and Grade II respectively. Westminster School is still based in the Abbey's precincts.

== Description ==
The memorial comprises a tall pink Peterhead granite pillar, carved with a ring of blank shields about halfway up, topped by a Portland stone capital and statues. The statue atop the column was carved by J. R. Clayton and depict Saint George slaying the dragon, below which is a lantern tier with four Gothic niches, housing statues of Saint Edward the Confessor (facing east), Henry III (west), Elizabeth I (south) and Queen Victoria (north), all carved by J. Birnie Philip, above a highly decorated floral capital. The pillar stands on a stone base with four granite pilasters, each topped by a stone statue of a lion, resting on three octagonal steps, ringed by iron railings. The base stands about 4.3 m (14 ft) high, with the column and statues another 18.6 m (61 ft) on top.

== Inscriptions ==
An inscription on the memorial's north side reads:

To the memory of those educated at Westminster School who died in the Russian and Indian wars A.D.1854–1859 on the field of battle or from wounds or sickness, some in early youth, some full of years and honours but who all alike gave their lives for their country. This column was erected by their old schoolfellows in token of sorrow for their loss and of pride in their valour and in full assurance that the remembrance of their heroism in life and death will inspire their successors at Westminster with the same courage and self-devotion.

Its south side displays the text:

Field Marshal Lord Raglan G.C.B. Commander in Chief 1854–1855. / Lieutenant General Frederick Markham, C.B. 2nd division / Russian War 1854–1856.

An inscription on its west side reads:

Captain Augustus Frederick Kynaston, R.N., C.B. / Major Augustus Saltren Willett, 17th Lancers / Captain Frederick Henry Dymock, 95th Regiment / Lieutenant Reginald Hugh Somerville, 23rd Fusiliers / Lieutenant William Walker Jordan, 34th Regiment / Lieutenant Richard Borough, Rifle Brigade / Midshipman Charles Madan, HMS Sanspareil / Frederick Henty, Commissariat Department / Russian War 1854–1856.

The opposite (east) side's inscription says:

General Sir William Barnard, G.C.B. Commander in Chief 1857 / Major John Waterfield, 38th Bengal Native Infantry / Major Walter Robert Prout, 56th Bengal Native Infantry / Captain Wilson Henry Jones, H.M 13th Light Infantry / Captain Louis Henry Bedford, H.M. 37th Regiment / Captain William Thornton Phillimore, 10th Bengal Native Infantry / Lieutenant Henry Bingham, H.M. 90th Regiment / Lieutenant Lovick Emilius Cooper, H.M. Rifle Brigade / Cornet William George Hawtrey Bankes, H.M. 7th Hussars, V.C. / Indian War 1857–1858.

== See also ==
- 1861 in art
