= Little George Street =

Street in Westminster, London, United Kingdom

Coordinates: 51.5007°N 0.12789°W

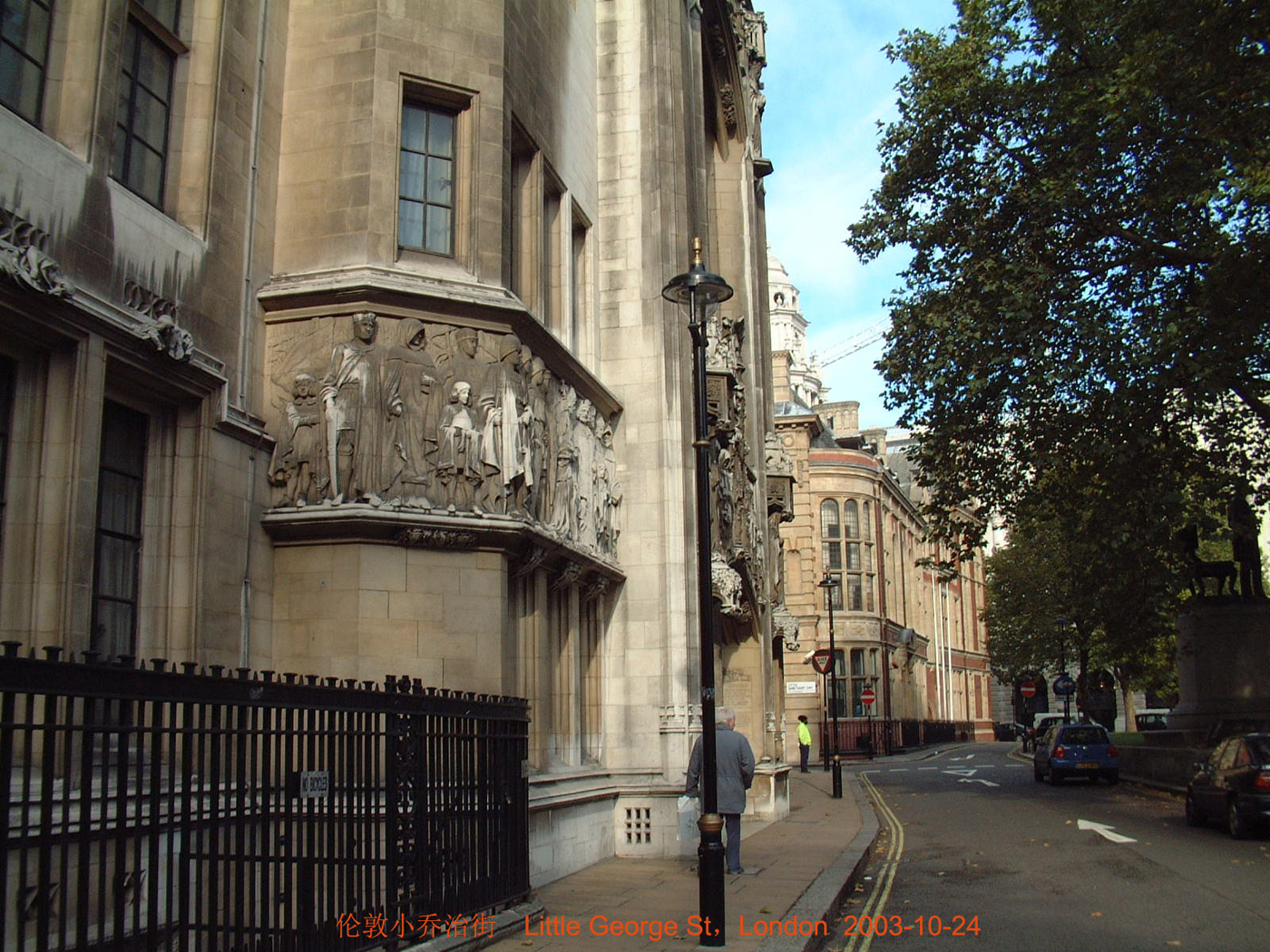
Little George Street in 2003

Little George Street is a street in Westminster, London, leading from Great George Street to Little Sanctuary in the vicinity of Parliament Square. It is the street that the Supreme Court of the United Kingdom is based on at the Middlesex Guildhall. Historically it was home to the nearby Sanctuary Tower and Belfry of the nearby Westminster Abbey. The Portman estate in Little George Street was located at the street.
