= Weeroona College Bendigo =

Coordinates: 36°44′19″S 144°17′52″E

- Bendigo, Victoria; Australia

Information
- Type: High school
- Motto: "Kind Safe Learners"
- Established: 1999
- Principal: Jason Bysouth
- Campus: White Hills
- Colours: Maroon, dark blue
- Website: weeroona.vic.edu.au

Weeroona College Bendigo is an Australian co-educational secondary school, catering for students in years 7 to 10, located in White Hills, a suburb of Bendigo, Victoria.

The school was formed in 1999 with the merger of White Hills Secondary College and Bendigo East Primary School.

The school has an enrolment of over 700 students, supported by over 70 staff. Year 9 and 10 students have the opportunity to specialise in specific areas of interest. Year 10 students also have the opportunity to undertake some units of their Victorian Certificate of Education (VCE) at the school. Most of the students who choose to go on to achieve the VCE do so at the nearby Bendigo Senior Secondary College.

Weeroona College Bendigo began to be rebuilt during 2008 and was completed prior to the start of 2013. The new school buildings were officially opened on 13 October 2013 by Damian Drum.

== See also ==
- List of schools in Victoria
