= Statue of George II, Golden Square =

Statue in London, England

Coordinates: 51.5117°N 0.1372°W

George II
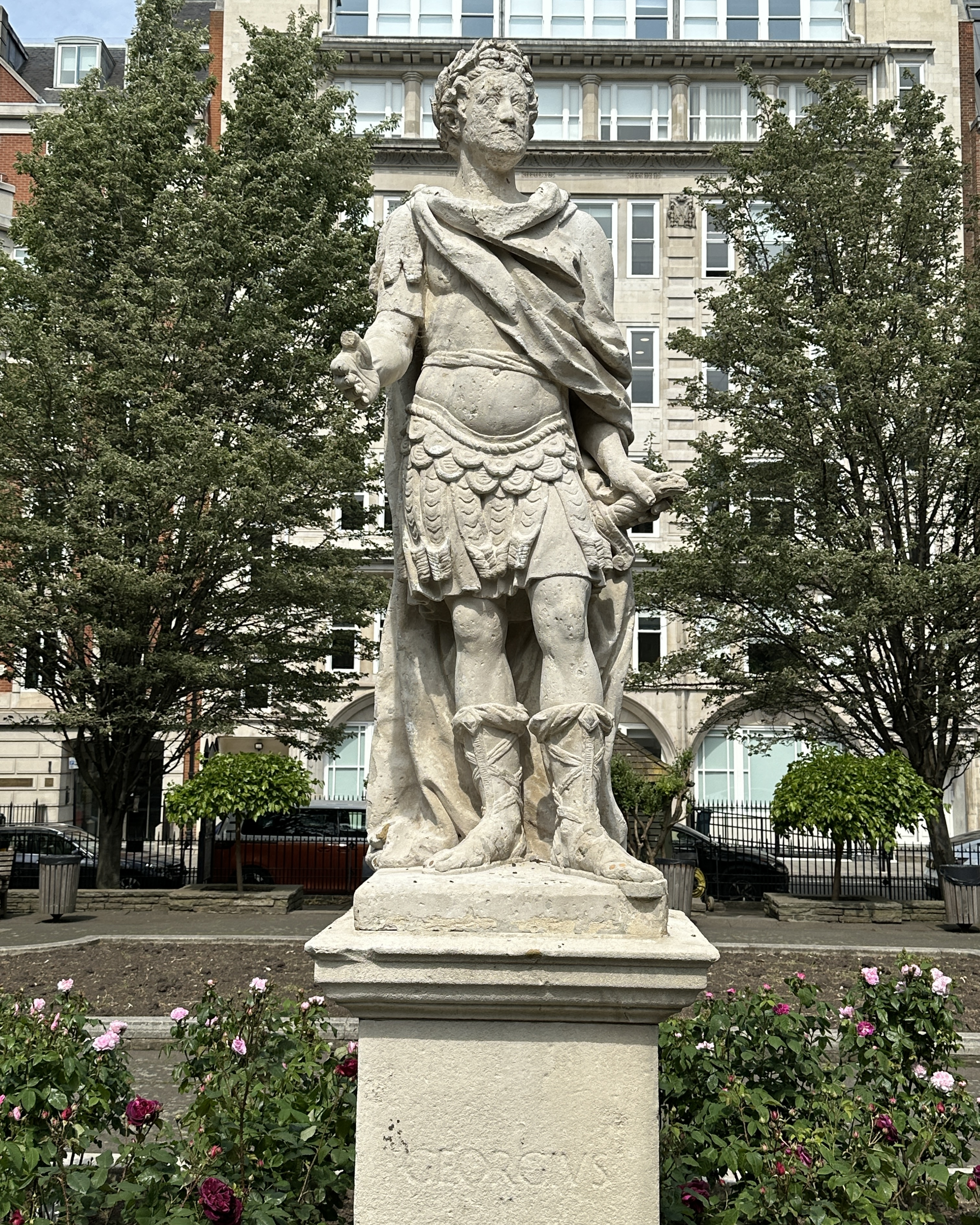
- Artist: Possibly John van Nost the younger
- Completion date: c. 1720
- Subject: George II or perhaps Charles II
- Location: London

Listed Building – Grade II
- Official name: Statue of George II in Centre of Square Garden
- Designated: 14 January 1970
- Reference no.: 1289197

The statue of George II is a Portland stone statue that stands at the centre of Golden Square in Soho, London. It depicts a man in Roman attire, who has commonly been identified as George II despite sparse evidence supporting such an identification. It has been Grade II listed since January 1970.

The statue's origin is not known for certain, but it is often said to have been part of a set made for Cannons for the Duke of Chandos. What is more certain is that it was erected in Golden Square around 1753, with folk history saying it was given to the square after the highest bid it managed at auction was a friendly nod. It was weathered and further damaged during the Second World War with restoration work carried out on it in 1988.

The statue is of Portland stone and if, as has been suggested, it was created for the grounds of a country house, it is likely to have served as an ornamental statue on a fountain. In Nicholas Nickleby, Dickens described it as a "mournful statue—the guardian genius of a little wilderness of shrubs".
