= Statue of William III, Kensington Palace =

Statue in Kensington Gardens, London, England

Statue of William III
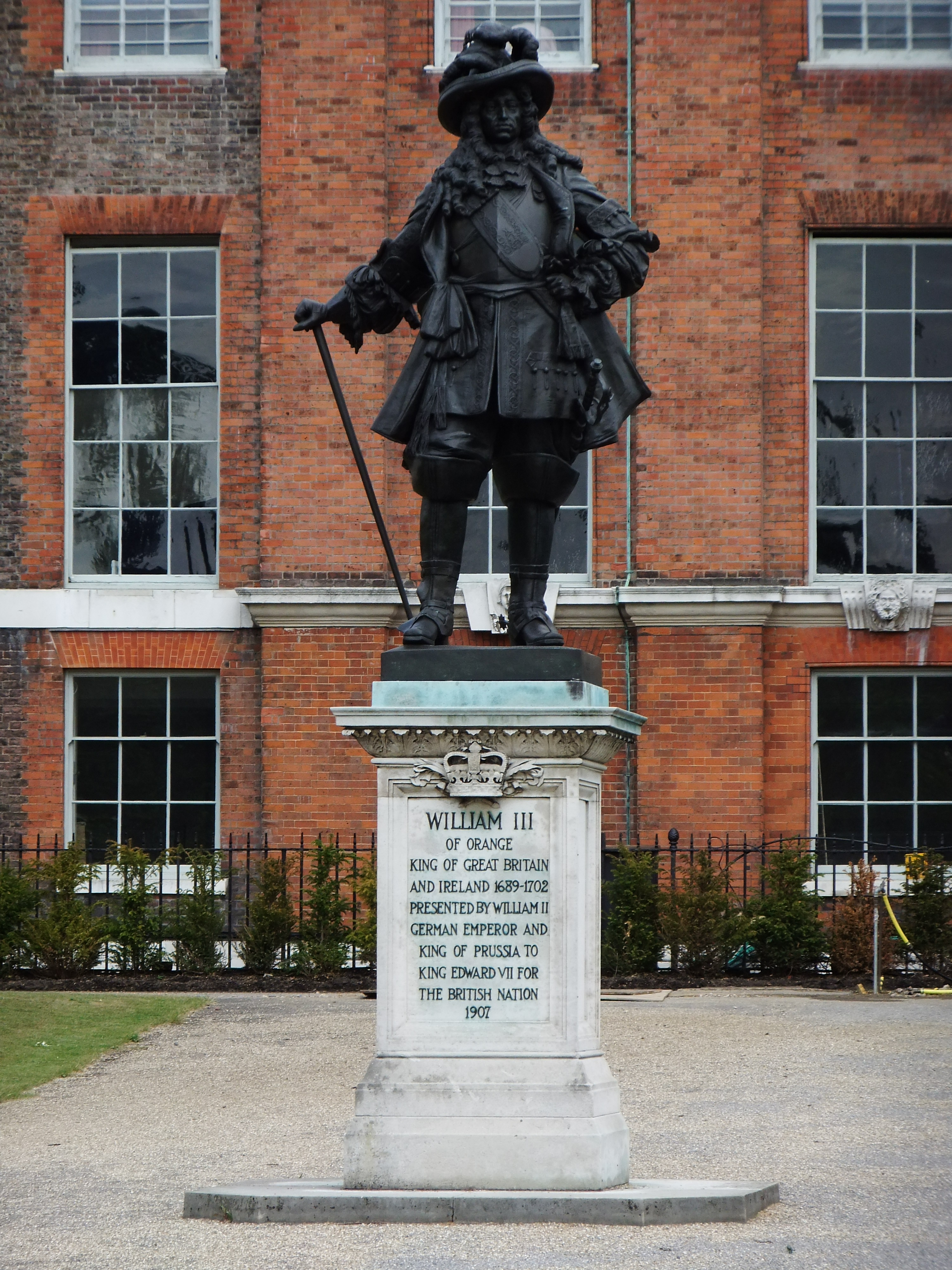
- The statue in 2011
- Interactive map of Statue of William III
- Location: Kensington Palace, London, United Kingdom
- Coordinates: 51°30.28′N 0°11.244′W
- Designer: Heinrich Baucke (statue); Aston Webb (pedestal)
- Type: Statue
- Material: Bronze
- Dedicated date: 1907
- Dedicated to: William III of England

A bronze statue of William III of England stands on the south side of Kensington Palace in London, facing towards the Golden Gates. The statue was designed by Heinrich Baucke and erected in 1907. It was cast by the Gladenbeck foundry in Berlin and given as a gift by the German Emperor Wilhelm II to his uncle, King Edward VII. The statue has been a Grade II listed building since 1969.

The statue was created as one of five large statues of the Princes of Orange – the Oranierfürsten – commissioned by Wilhelm II and erected in 1907 on the balustrade of the terrace on the north side of the Berliner Schloss, beside the Lustgarten in Berlin. The statues were intended to illustrate the close relationship between the Dutch House of Orange and the German House of Hohenzollern, and they echo similar statues by François Dieussart erected by Frederick William, Elector of Brandenburg, in the pleasure garden of the City Palace, Potsdam. Copies of each statue were also commissioned and presented as gifts: the originals were damaged in the Second World War and four were destroyed. (The statue of Maurice of Orange by Martin Wolff survived, and was displayed beside Humboldt Box.) Most of the copies have survived, including the statue in London.

The bronze statue is 2.5 m (8 ft 2 in) high, with the subject depicted at larger than life size. He wears 17th-century military dress, including an ornate feathered hat, sword and cuirass, and high leather boots. The figure stands on a 1.9 m (6 ft 3 in) Portland stone pedestal which was designed by Aston Webb, who would later create the Victoria Memorial in London.

The front of the pedestal bears the inscription:

William III / of Orange / King of Great Britain / and Ireland / 1689–1702 / Presented by William II / German Emperor and / King of Prussia / to King Edward VII / for the British Nation / 1907

A popular story states that the design of the character Captain Hook was inspired by the statue.

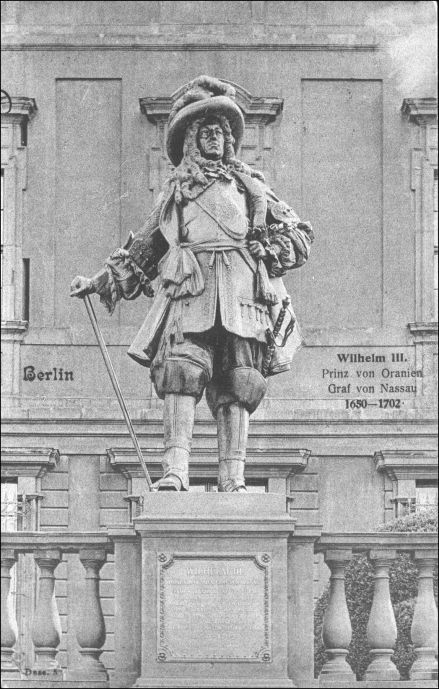
Similar statue formerly sited on the Lustgarten terrace on the north side of the Berliner Schloss

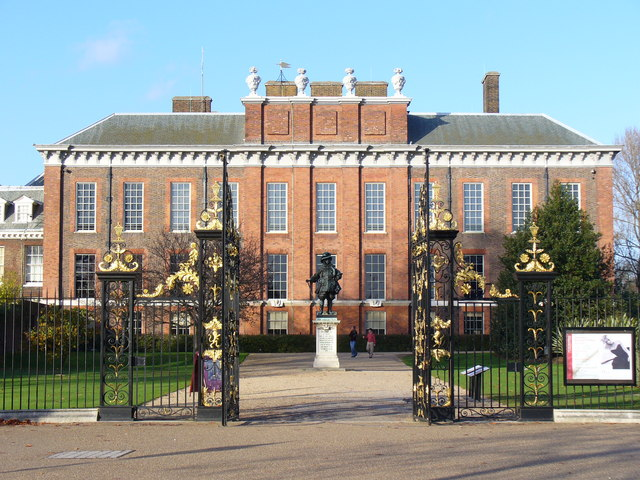
View through the Golden Gates, with the statue before the south façade of Kensington Palace

== See also ==
- Grade II listed buildings in London
- List of public art in Kensington Gardens
- List of statues of English and British royalty in London
