= Golden Square =

Square in the City of Westminster

Coordinates: 51°30′42″N 0°8′14″W

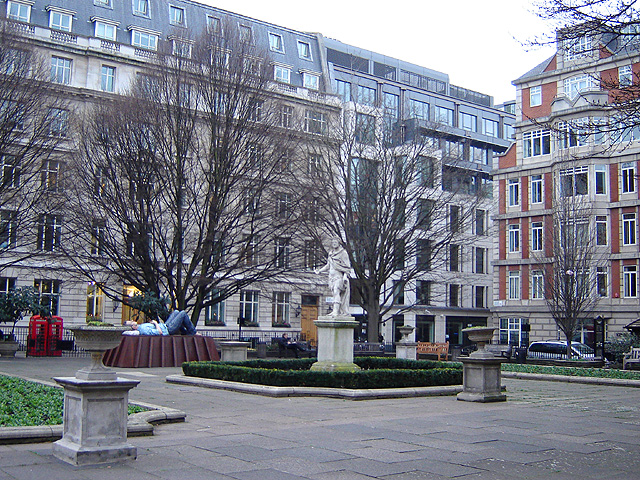
Golden Square, Soho. The central statue is one of only two public statues of George II in the capital. In the background, the sculpture of a reclining man is Catafalque by Sean Henry.

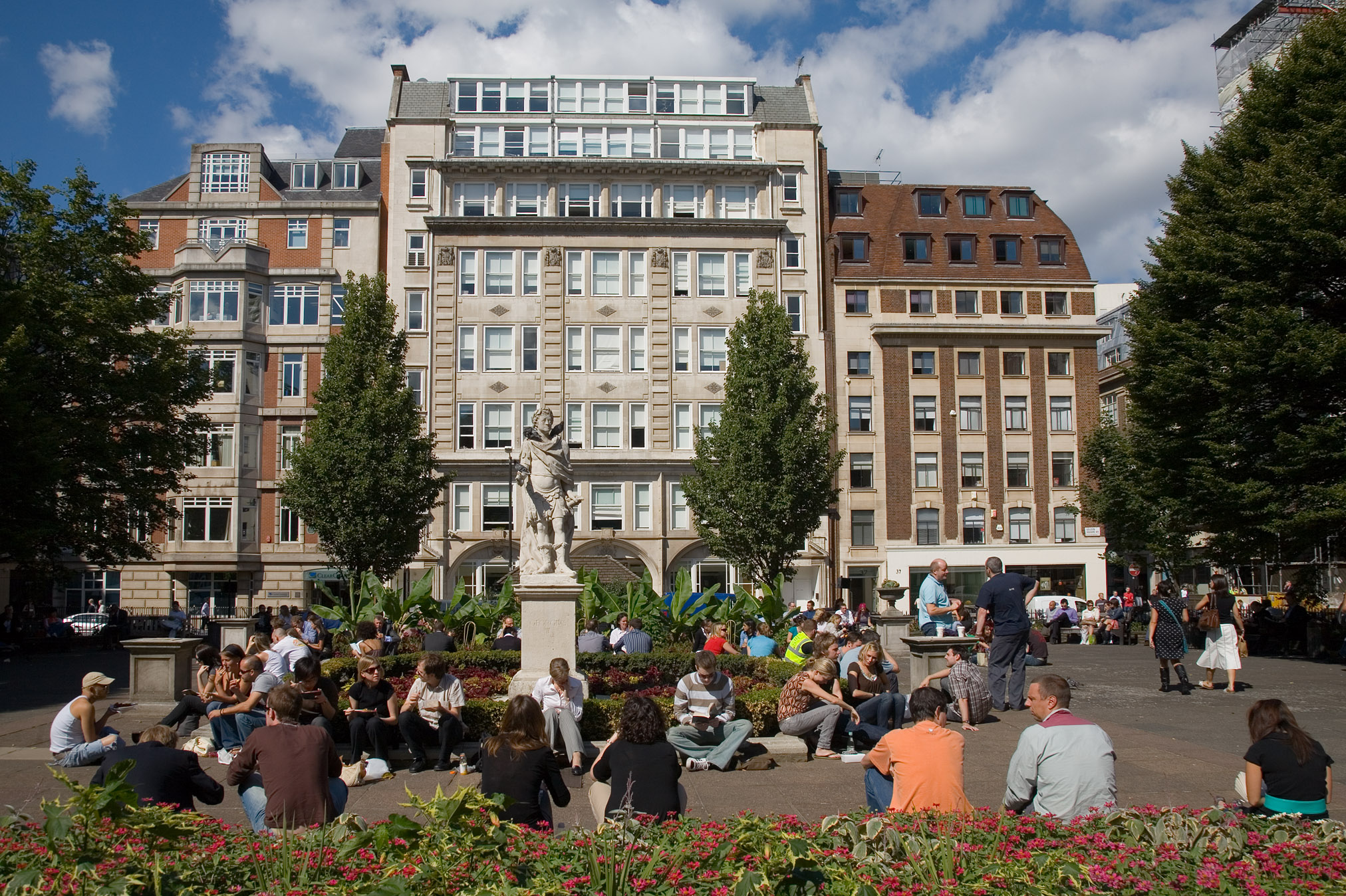
Looking north on Golden Square

Golden Square, in Soho, the City of Westminster, is a mainly hardscaped garden square planted with a few mature trees and raised borders in Westminster flanked by classical office buildings. Its four approach ways are north and south but it is centred 125 metres east of Regent Street and double that NNE of Piccadilly Circus. A small block south is retail/leisure street Brewer Street. The square and its buildings have featured in many works of literature and host many media, advertising and public relations companies that characterise its neighbourhood within Soho.

== History ==
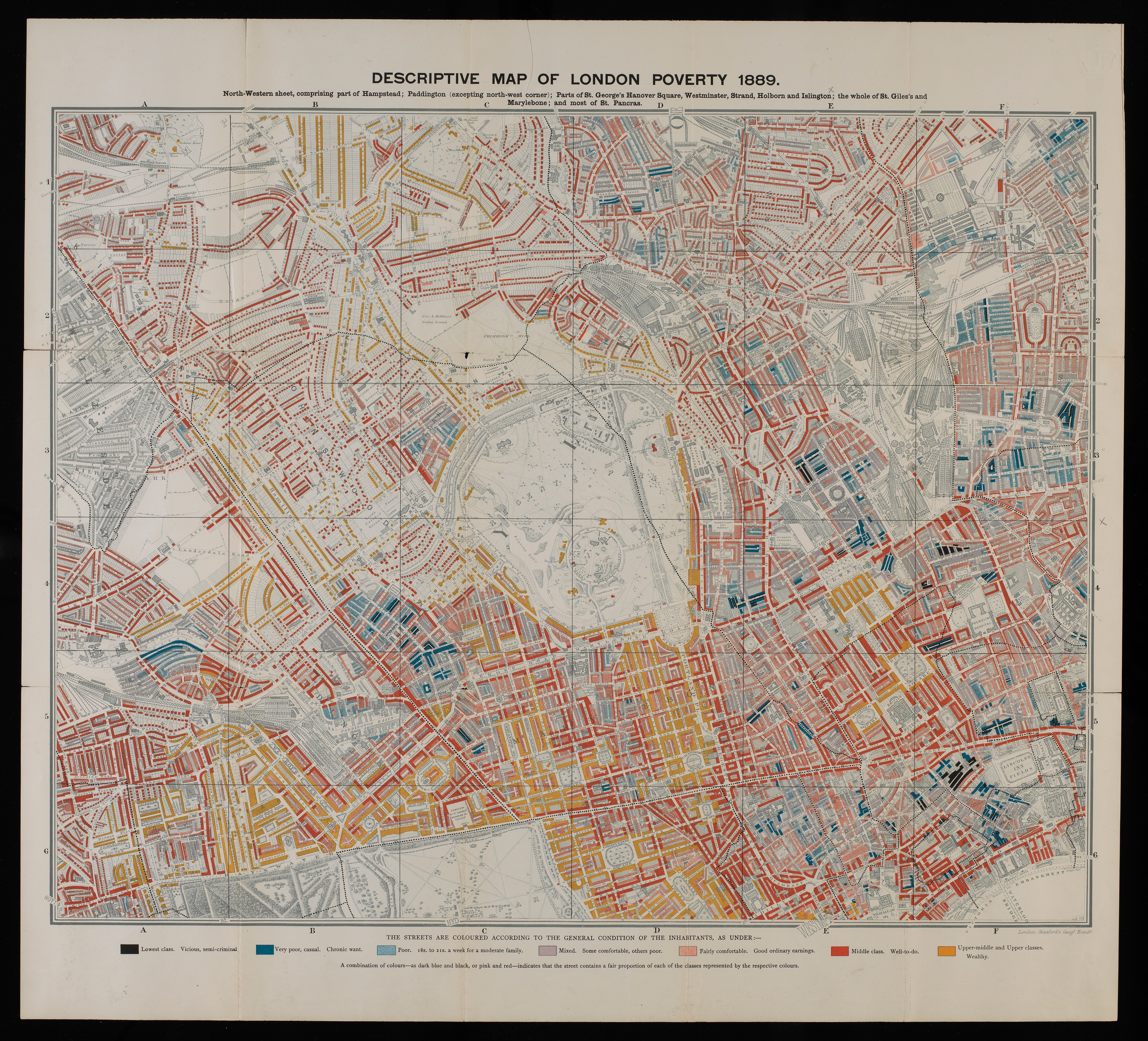
Booth's Poverty Map, 1889, identifies the square and its approach ways had middle incomes; high poverty pervaded the backstreets beyond the block north and east.

Originally the site of a plague pit, this west London square was brought into being from the 1670s onwards. The square was possibly laid down by Sir Christopher Wren; the plan bears Wren's signature, but the patent does not state whether it was submitted by the petitioners or whether it originated in Wren's office. It very rapidly became the political and ambassadorial district of the late 17th and early 18th centuries, housing the Portuguese embassy among others.

The town house of the first Viscount Bolingbroke, much favoured by Queen Anne, graced the square. The statue of George II sculpted by John Nost in 1724 came from Cannons House in March 1753. William Pitt the Elder was born in the Square in 1708. Confusion surrounds whether the statue represents King George II of Great Britain, or King Charles II, as noted on the signage in Golden Square. Oral history recounts that the statue was accidentally won at auction, when the winning bidder raised his hand to greet a friend; the purchase price so low that he decided not to contest and gave the statue as a gift to the people of Golden Square.

== Listed buildings ==
- Of №s 33 to 39 consecutive forming the north (today three terraced buildings): internally merged №s 34 to 36 (all known as №36) is a listed building in the mainstream, starting category.
- Of №s 1 to 12 consecutive forming the east: № 11 is listed, at Grade II*
- Of №s 13 to 19 consecutive forming the south: № 19 is listed, at Grade II, the mainstream category
- Of №s 20 to 31 consecutive forming the west: №s 20, 21, 23, and 24 are listed, at Grade II.

Numbering and traffic proceed clockwise.

== In film, fiction and the media ==
- The square is the setting of the third part of Neal Stephenson's Baroque Cycle, The System of the World.
- A key scene in A Handful of Dust, by Evelyn Waugh, takes place in a nightclub in the fictional Sink Street, off Golden Square.
- Confessions Of An English Opium Eater by Thomas De Quincey sees the protagonist part from the square and for the last time from Anne, the prostitute with whom he falls in love.
- A verbal tradition was seized upon for the Hulu series Harlots to host the home and business of fictional "bawd" (brothel keeper) Lydia Quigley; the square itself was not used for filming. Multiple characters utter the square's name as a metonym to refer to her business.
- Charles Dickens' works David Copperfield and The Life and Adventures of Nicholas Nickleby. In the latter it is the square where Ralph Nickleby lives in a spacious house and has his "establishment":

Although a few members of the graver professions live about Golden Square, it is not exactly in anybody's way to or from anywhere. It is one of the squares that have been; a quarter of the town that has gone down in the world, and taken to letting lodgings. Many of its first and second floors are let, furnished, to single gentlemen; and it takes boarders besides. It is a great resort of foreigners. The dark-complexioned men who wear large rings, and heavy watch-guards, and bushy whiskers, and who congregate under the Opera Colonnade, and about the box-office in the season, between four and five in the afternoon, when they give away the orders,—all live in Golden Square, or within a street of it. Two or three violins and a wind instrument from the Opera band reside within its precincts. Its boarding-houses are musical, and the notes of pianos and harps float in the evening time round the head of the mournful statue, the guardian genius of a little wilderness of shrubs, in the centre of the square. On a summer's night, windows are thrown open, and groups of swarthy moustached men are seen by the passer-by, lounging at the casements, and smoking fearfully. Sounds of gruff voices practising vocal music invade the evening's silence; and the fumes of choice tobacco scent the air. There, snuff and cigars, and German pipes and flutes, and violins and violoncellos, divide the supremacy between them. It is the region of song and smoke. Street bands are on their mettle in Golden Square; and itinerant glee-singers quaver involuntarily as they raise their voices within its boundaries.

== Notable residents ==
- Actress Frances Alsop moved to the square in 1803.
- Singer Caterina Gabrielli lived at the square from 1775 to 1776.
- Architect and builder (and later Lord Provost) William Leslie of Nethermuir had offices at 8 Golden Square from 1850.
- Artist Prince Hoare lived at number 16 after 1781.
- Artist Angelica Kauffmann lived at number 16 from 1767 to 1781. In 1768, she became one of two female founding members of the Royal Academy in London.
- Portuguese statesman the Marquess of Pombal lived at number 24 from 1739 to 1744.
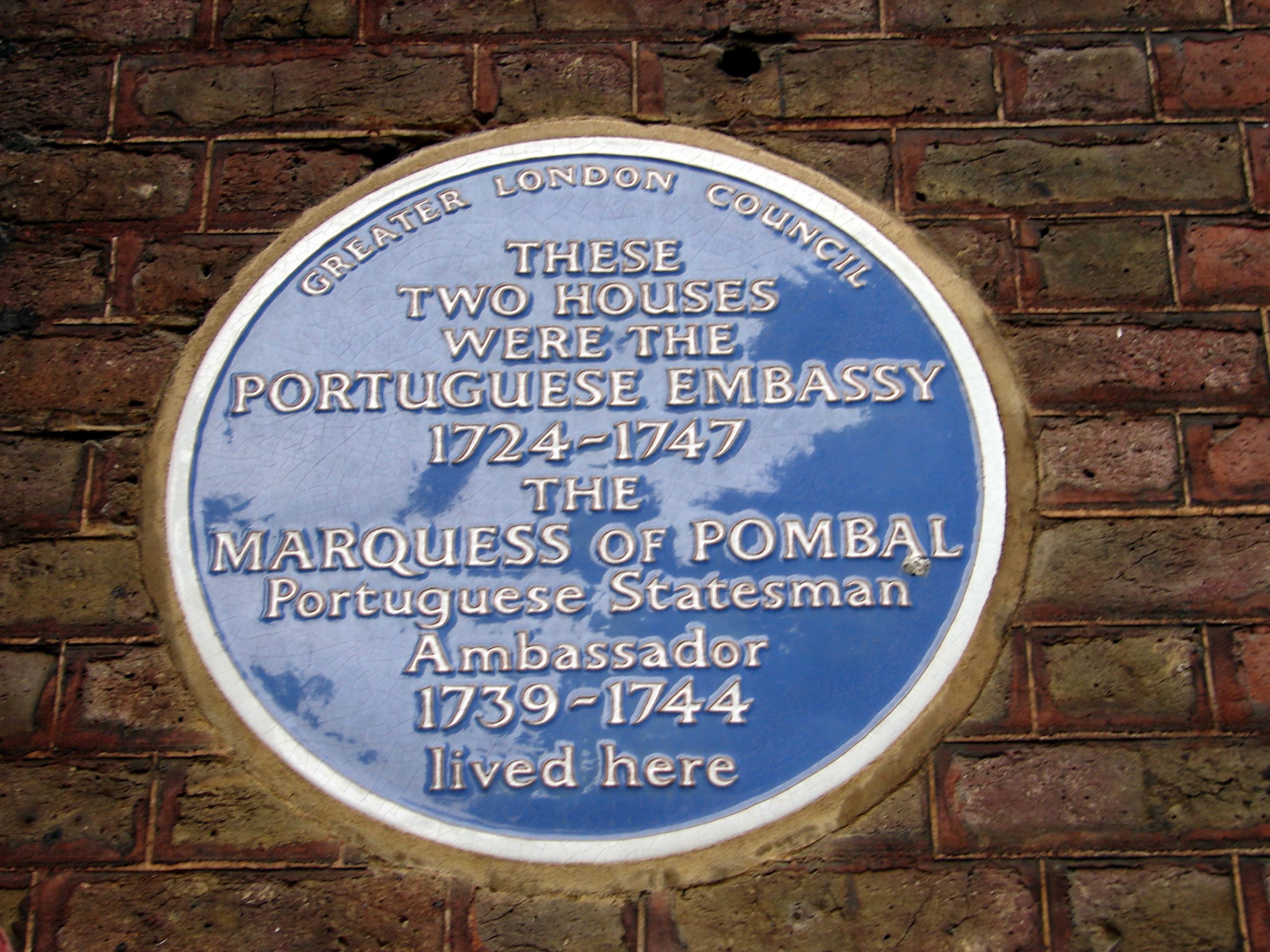
  Marquess of Pombal (4624392095)
- Singer Anastasia Robinson lived at number 35 in 1710.
- Artist Martin Archer Shee lived at number 13 from 1796 to 1798. Shee became president of the Royal Academy in 1830.
- American statesman and president, Thomas Jefferson, stayed in Golden Square from March 12 to April 26, 1786 in his only visit to London.
- Ordnance Survey cartographer James Gardner moved to number 33 Brewer Street upon his semi-retirement in 1840.
- Ada von Dantzig worked in the painting conservation studio of conservator Helmut Ruhemann in 1940s and their workplace was marked by the first London (and British) Stolperstein stone in 2022.

== Current residents ==
- Phonographic Performance Limited is based at No 1. Virgin Radio was based there at its launch in 1993 and (as Absolute Radio) from 2008. After its acquisition of Absolute in 2013 Bauer Radio consolidated its regional holdings there, including Planet Rock. They closed the studios in April 2024.
- Monmouth Dean occupies an office on the eighth floor of №4.
- The financial analytics firm Risk Control is located at №8.
- Digital Cinema Media (DCM) and the Cinema Advertising Association (CAA) simultaneously occupied №12. Most of the cinema advertising in Britain was controlled from this building, until December 2013 to move to a building in Regent's Place.
- Sony Pictures Entertainment and Sony Pictures Television had key premises at №s 25 to 30 until mid 2020.
- The headquarters of Clear Channel UK, and Clear Channel International occupy №33.
- The global head- and London offices of M & C Saatchi Group and its subsidiary companies, including M&C Saatchi, M&C Saatchi Performance, M&C Saatchi Export, LIDA, Clear, TALK PR, Play*, Studio 36, and 5th Element occupy №36 (formerly known as 34 to 36).
