= Broad Sanctuary =

Street in the City of Westminster

Coordinates: 51.5°N 0.1283°W

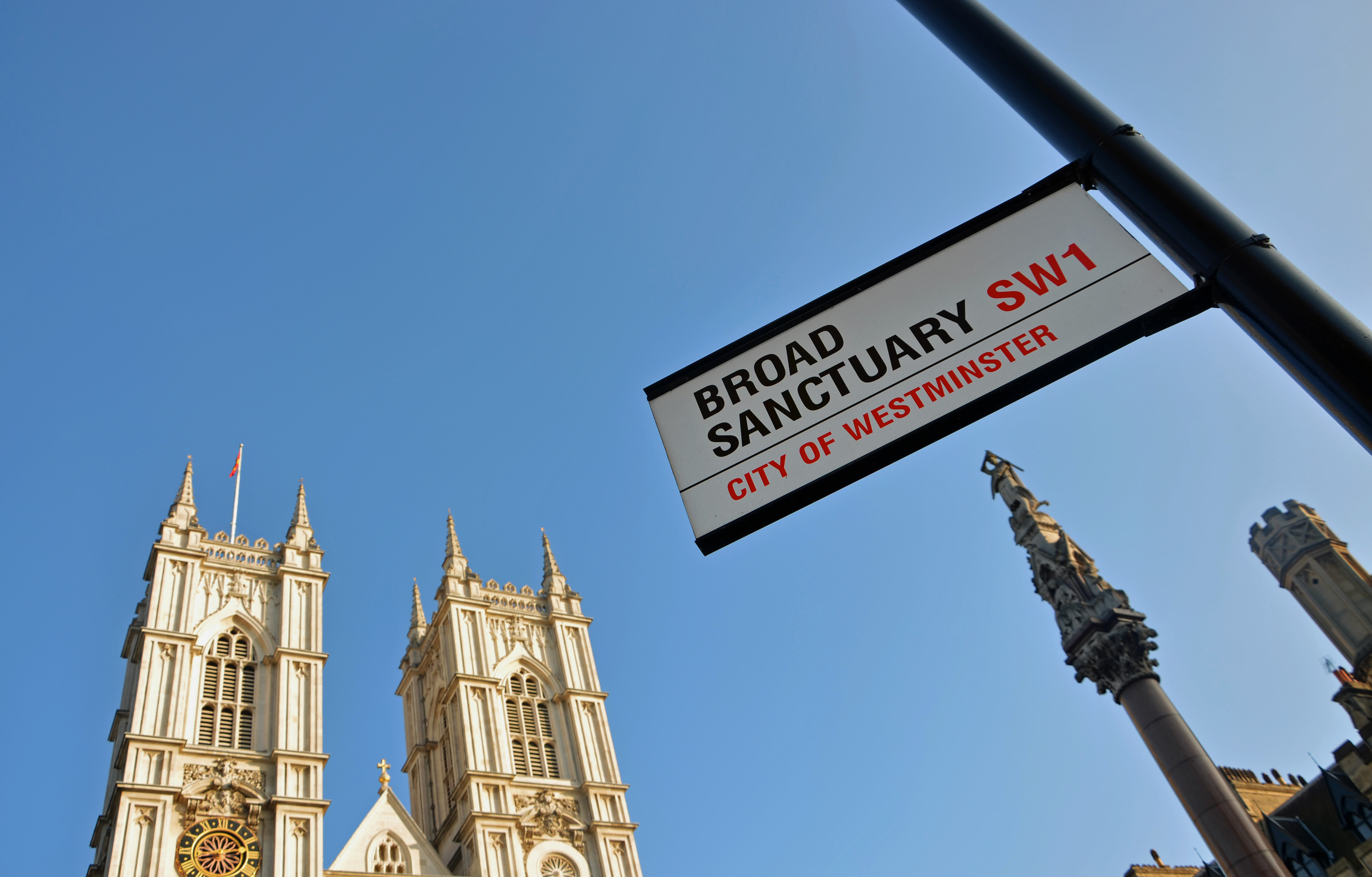
Broad Sanctuary sign.

Broad Sanctuary is a street in Westminster, London, leading from Victoria Street to Parliament Square at Great George Street.

== History ==
The name refers to a Medieval open space which stood in front of Westminster Abbey.

== Notable sites ==
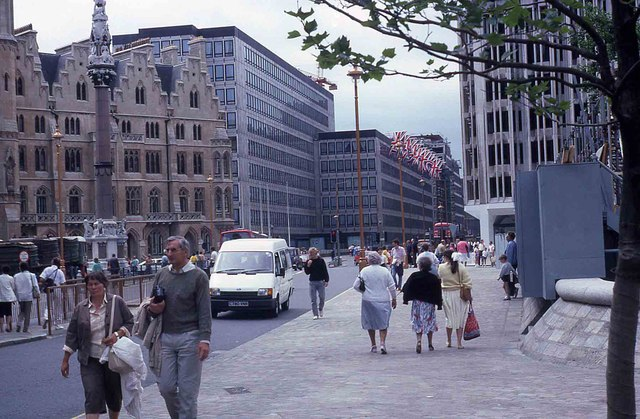
Broad Sanctuary in July 1986

- Westminster Abbey
- Queen Elizabeth II Centre
- 1-8 Broad Sanctuary
- 19 19A and 20 Broad Sanctuary
- United Nations Green
- Westminster Hospital
- Westminster Scholars War Memorial
