= Sex trafficking in Timor-Leste =

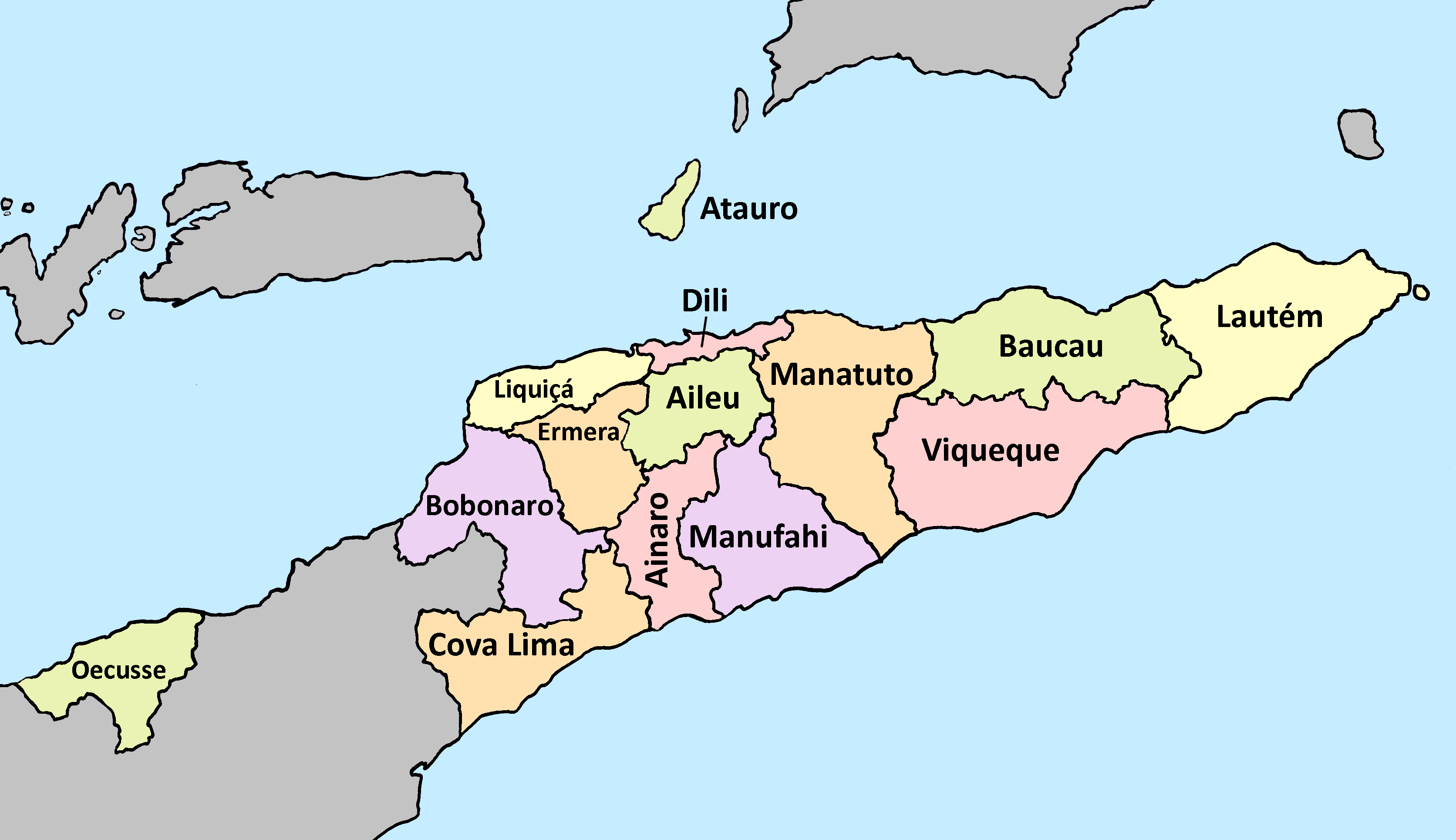
Citizen and foreign victims are sex trafficked into and out of the municipalities of Timor-Leste. They are raped and physically and psychologically harmed in locations within these administrative divisions.

Sex trafficking in Timor-Leste is human trafficking for the purpose of sexual exploitation and slavery that occurs in the Democratic Republic of Timor-Leste.

East Timorese citizens, primarily women and girls, have been sex trafficked within the country and to other countries in Asia. Foreign victims are sex trafficked into the country. Children, persons in poverty, and migrants are particularly vulnerable to sex trafficking. Victims are deceived, threatened, and or forced into prostitution. They suffer from physical and psychological trauma and are typically guarded and or locked up in poor conditions. A number contract sexually transmitted diseases from rapes. Traffickers are often members of or facilitated by crime syndicates and gangs.

The government of Timor-Leste has been criticized for its inadequate anti-sex trafficking initiatives. Officials and police have been complicit in sex trafficking.

== United Nations Integrated Mission in East Timor ==
In the 2000s and 2010s, men in the peacekeeping force of the United Nations Integrated Mission in East Timor, which assisted police and took part in prostitution raids, were accused of taking part in prostitution It was alleged they frequented brothels, including those using trafficked women. UN vehicles were used to pick up street prostitutes. There were also allegations that a ship chartered by the UN was being used to traffic children for prostitution in the country.
