= Pedicar =

The Pedicar was a pedal powered quadricycle velomobile developed in 1973 by the Environmental Trans-Sport Corporation in Windsor, Connecticut.

== Background ==
The Pedicar had a seat and an enclosed body with one door. The vehicle was propelled by a unique linear cable drive train with five forward and one reverse gear. The four wheels were standard bicycle wheels. At least one source has mentioned certain features, but are not stated to be standard nor optional: cyclops headlight, door locks, pnuematic bicycle tires, beltline protective molding, windshield wipers and rearview mirror.

The vehicle was designed by Robert L. Bundschuh, a 38 year old ex-Gyrodyne aircraft engineer and his coworker, Lionel Martin, in 1972. They produced 20 models which sold for $500 in 1973. Flyers and TV commercials were produced.

Despite being marketed as a replacement for an automobile during the ongoing oil crisis and being fully enclosed from the weather, the Pedicar was not as commercially successful as the contemporary People Powered Vehicle and manufacturing issues prevented a contract with the U.S. Army from being completed.
