= Fantom =

Swedish vehicle

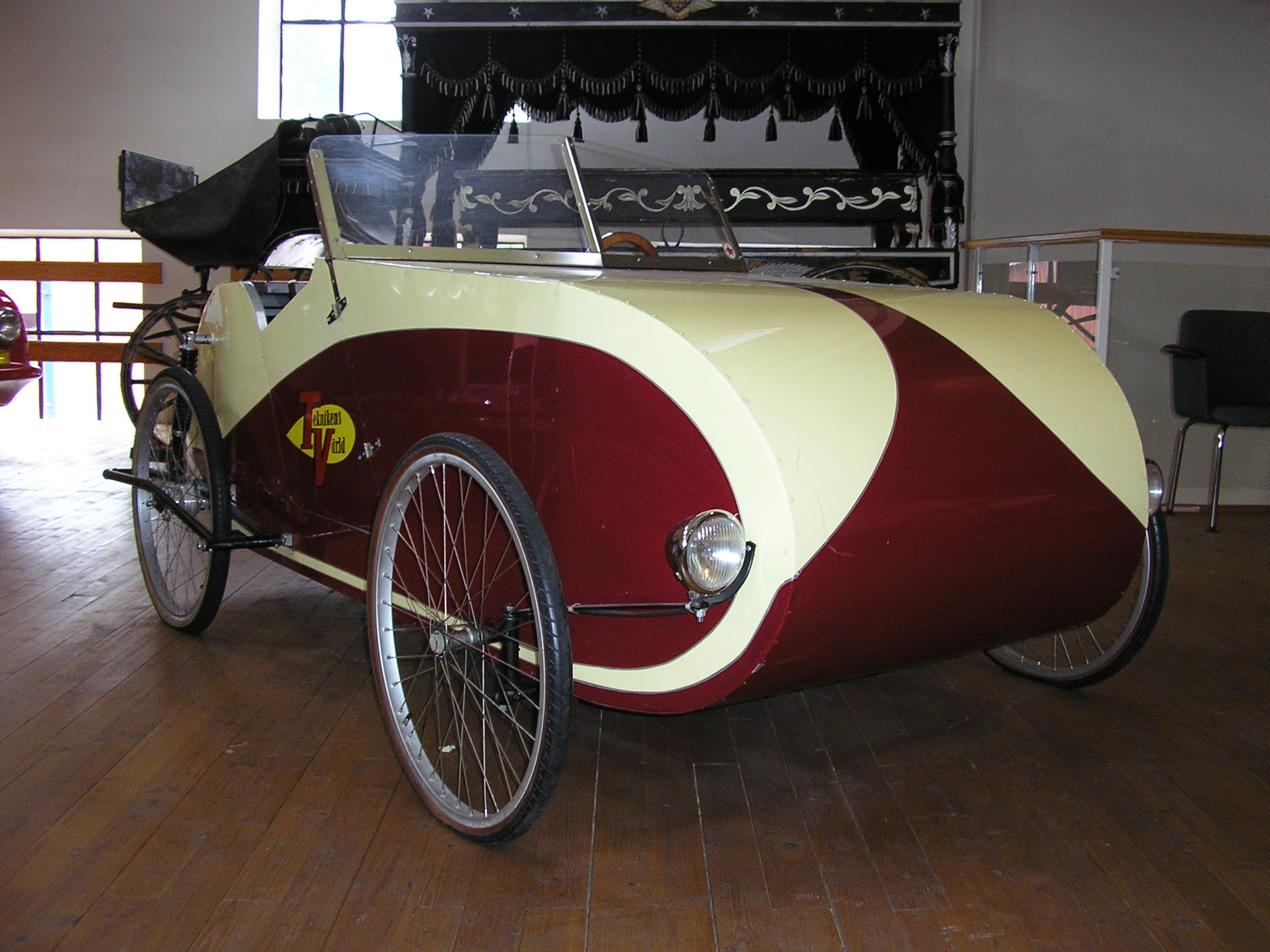
A two-seat open top Fantom.

Fantom is a Swedish velomobile with four wheels, two in the front and two in the rear. It has no front suspension, but has suspension in the rear.

Fantom was never sold as a finished product. Instead it was sold as a set of drawings. The drawings are not exact and should be used as a guide. Hobbex bought the rights to the drawings and have sold it continuously since the 1940s apart from a short break in the 1990s. Over 100,000 copies of the drawing were sold, but only ten documented builds were finished. The drawings had no measurements, and if you followed the blueprints, you would not be able to open the door.

In the 1980s the Fantom was rediscovered by Carl-Georg Rasmussen who built a redesigned version called Leitra.
