= Cab-Bike =

German brand of velomobile

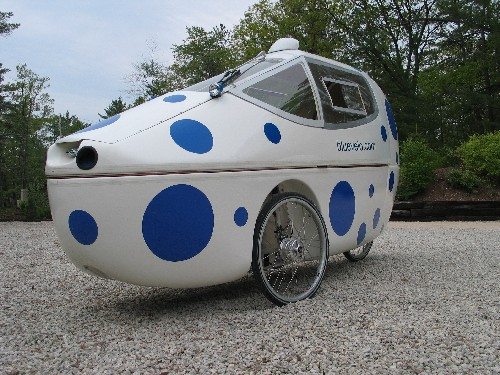

The Cab-Bike is a brand of velomobile that has been in production since 1998. Designed by Rinehold Schwemmer and manufactured by German Eslava, it was developed as a vehicle that would permit year-round commuting. Its features include a self-supporting Monocoque chassis, suspension on all three wheels, a completely enclosed chain, and a large luggage area.

The vehicle is built in a modular fashion and can be converted to different designs by changing some of the exterior covers. In the "Cabin" version of the Cab-Bike, the rider is fully enclosed and protected from the elements, while in the "Speedster" version the rider's head is exposed. Because of its reduced frontal area the "Speedster" is also faster than the Cabin version.

PIMA Velo Bike of Poland have since acquired production and trade rights for the Cab-Bike. Their technical and styling updates have given rise to the Cab-Bike Hawk.
