= VeloMetro Mobility =

Canadian electric velomobile manufacturer

VeloMetro Mobility Inc
- Company type: Private
- Industry: Transportation
- Founded: 2014
- Founders: Jonathan Faille; John Stonier; Sean Boyd; Kody Baker
- Fate: Bankrupt
- Headquarters: 1885 Franklin St, Vancouver, Canada
- Areas served: Canada
- Key people: CEO David Watson; CTO Duane Nickull
- Products: Electric bicycle
- Brands: Veemo
- Website: veemo.ca

VeloMetro Mobility, Inc. (doing business under the tradename Veemo), was an electric velomobile manufacturer based out of Vancouver, Canada. The company has invested eight years of research and development to create a three-wheeled, semi-enclosed, electric-assisted velomobile, called a Veemo. The vehicles do not require a driver's licence to ride in most jurisdictions and can be operated on bicycle paths as well as standard roadways.

== History ==
VeloMetro was co-founded in 2014 by Kody Baker, Sean Boyd, and Jonathan Faille of Perkuna Engineering, along with entrepreneur John Stonier. The first prototype vehicle was built in 2014 and they first unveiled their Veemo vehicle at the BC Tech Summit in 2016. The first pilot fleet started at the University of British Columbia in late 2017. The pilot program of 5 vehicles was made available to the public in February 2018. The pilot concluded in April 2018.

The company pivoted in late 2019 and decided to pursue a manufacturing and distribution of a new generation of Veemo products aimed at those who care about climate change. A new generation of lightweight, stable and efficient Veemo vehicles use a semi-enclosed design as opposed to the earlier fully enclosed design and have a much stiffer monocoque chassis. The new Veemo weighs in at less than 62 kg dry weight and uses a revolutionary belt drive system coupled to a continuously variable transmission rear hub. The new vehicle qualifies for many standards such as EN 15194 (European Union) and eBike regulations in Canada, the UK and United States and various other countries, making it bike lane eligible and legal without insurance or a driver's license. The business shift focuses on direct to consumer (DTC) sales models as well as a variation of the model aimed at the shared vehicle operator market.

VeloMetro announced bankruptcy, effective January 23, 2023.

As of July 2023, the assets of Veemo have been acquired by Envo Drive Systems, which hopes to put the Veemo into production by summer 2024.

== Vehicle ==
The Veemo is a single person, pedal-electric (Pedelec) hybrid vehicle which is regulated as an electric bicycle to a top speed of 32 km/h (20 mph) and power limit of 500 watts in Canada. The second generation vehicle weighs 62 kg and is capable of climbing hills of up to a 20% grade. It is semi-enclosed and has sufficient storage space to hold a full-sized overhead baggage suitcase. The internal battery is replenished through battery swapping.

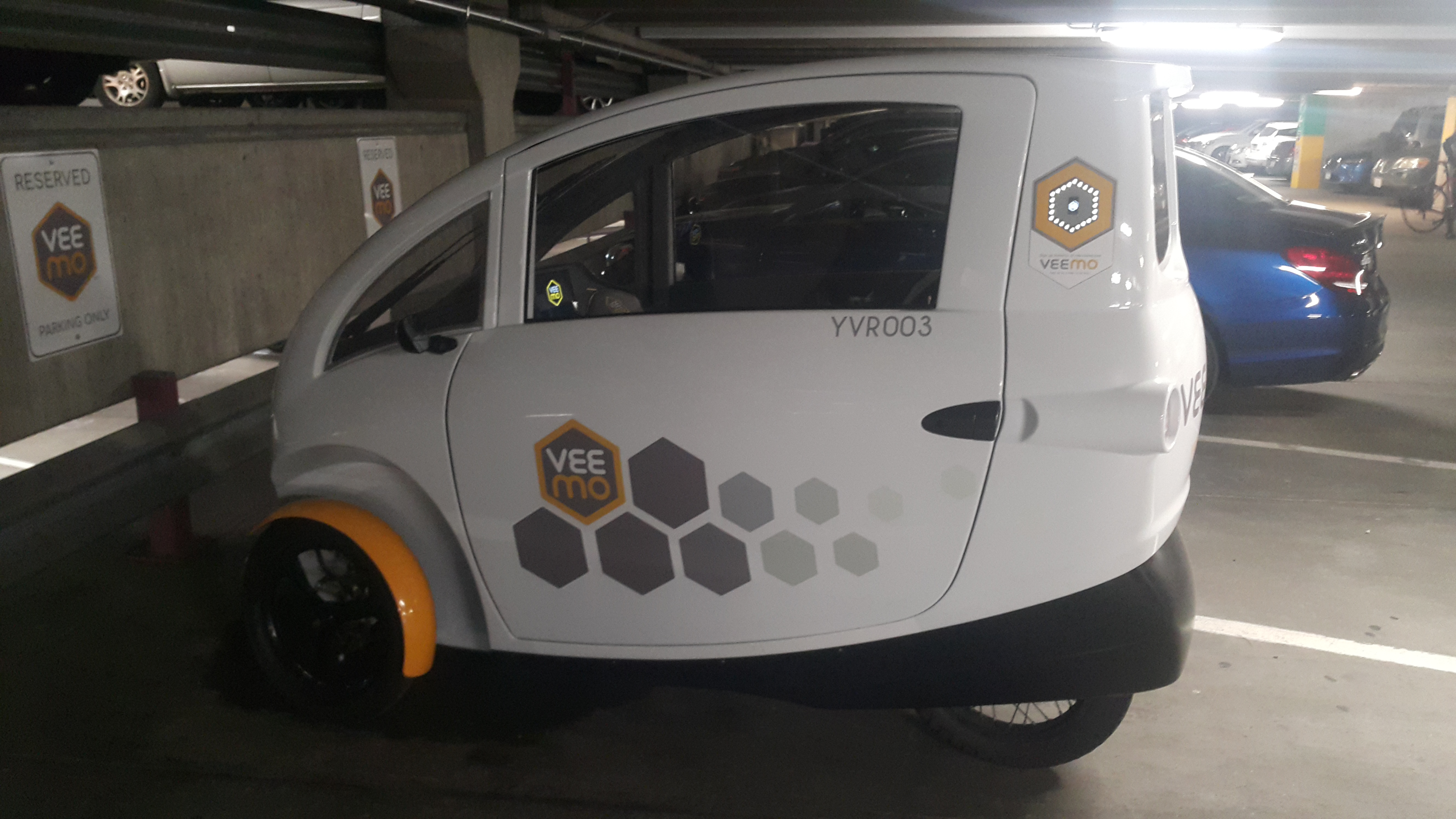
The exterior of an early prototype Veemo vehicle with a fully enclosed cab.

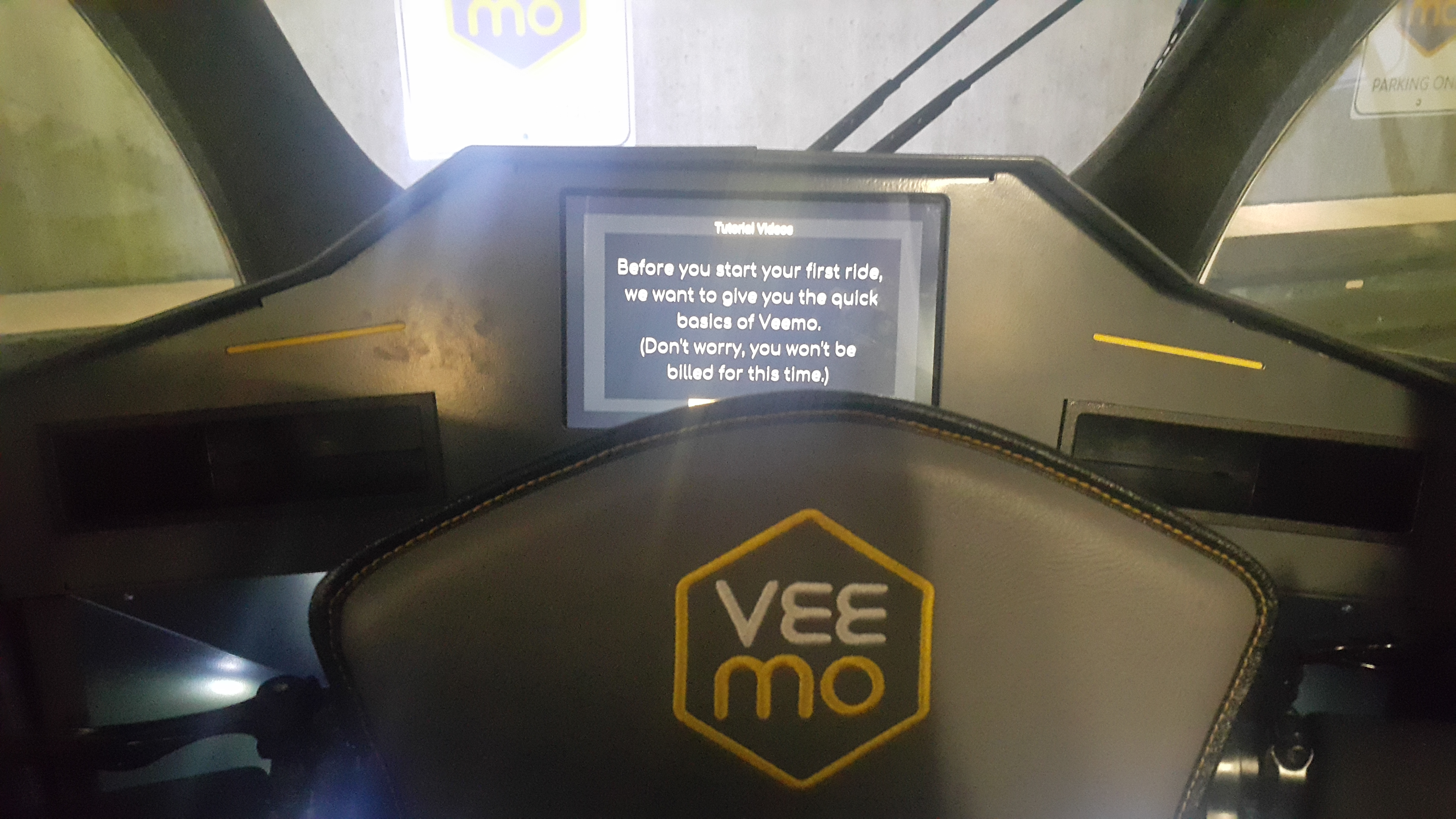
The interior of an early prototype Veemo vehicle

== Veemo Service ==
Veemo Service was an idea similar to car2go, to provide a one way fleet sharing service accessible through a website or a smartphone app. Members would not need a driver's license and would register and start using the vehicles immediately. Riders would pay by-the-minute and park the vehicles in any valid parking spot within the designated home zone, which would be indicated in an in-dash display.

This service was never implemented, as it was planned around the fully enclosed prototype vehicle, which was never developed beyond the prototyping stage.
