= ENVO Drive Systems =

ENVO Drive Systems is a Canadian company that designs and manufactures electric mobility products. The company’s product line includes electric bicycles, electric snow vehicles, and other electric transportation technologies. Established in 2015, ENVO Drive Systems is based in Burnaby, British Columbia.

== History ==
ENVO Drive Systems was founded by Ali Kazemkhani, an engineer focused on developing sustainable transportation solutions. The company initially began by creating e-bike conversion kits allowing riders to convert standard bicycles into e-bikes with custom power and battery configurations and later expanded its offerings to include complete electric vehicles and mobility platforms.

ENVO's Flex series includes modular e-bikes that can be transformed into e-bike, e-trike, and snow bike.

ENVO develops electric winter vehicles designed for mobility on snow-covered terrain. The ENVO Flex Snowbike is a modular electric snow bike equipped with a track system and front ski suitable for winter conditions. The ENVO Snowkart is a fully electric track based go-kart designed for snow use. ENVO also offers an Electric Snowbike Kit, a conversion kit that adapts bicycles for snow travel.

In 2023, ENVO acquired Veemo, a pedal-assist three-wheeled, semi-enclosed, electric-assisted velomobile. Veemo is regulated as an electric bicycle to a top speed of 32 km/h (20 mph) and power limit of 500 watts in Canada. ENVO also launched NextMove an industrial design competition geared micro-electric mobility devices.

In 2024, ENVO launched UPT, a modular chassis micro electric vehicle based on the winning concept of NextMove.

In 2025, ENVO acquired Moonbikes, a French manufacturer of electric snow bike, expanding its snow product line.

== Awards and recognition ==
ENVO Drive Systems has been recognized in the electric mobility industry for its product innovations. ENVO was a recipient of the Deloitte Technology Fast 500 award in both 2023 and 2024.
