= Leitra =

Danish velomobile manufacturer (1982-)

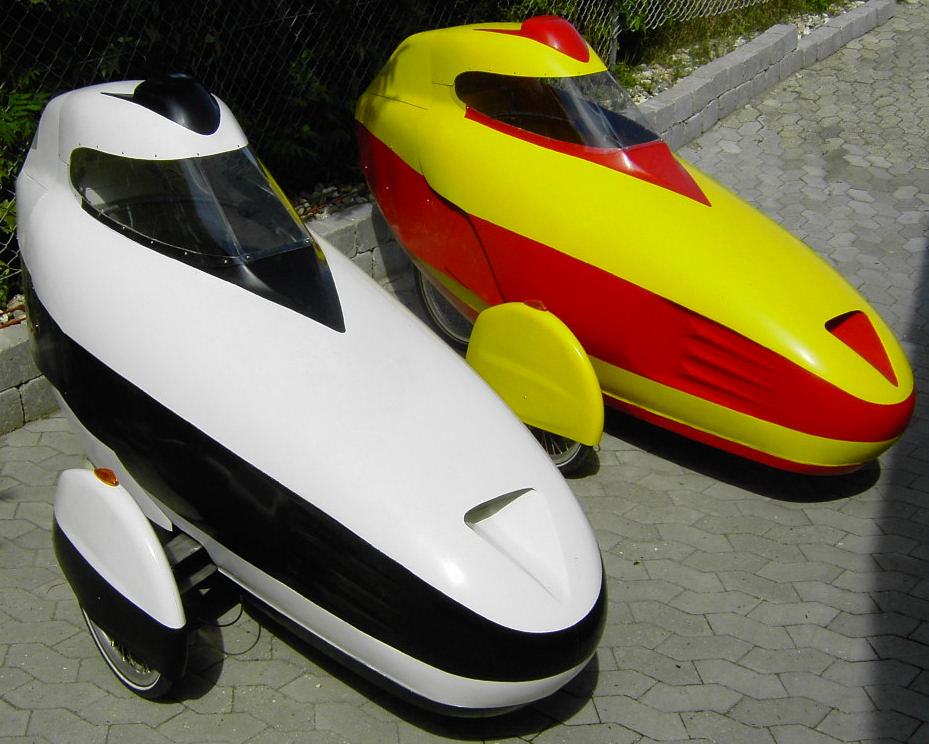
- Leitra velomobiles
- Founded: 31 December 1982
- Headquarters: Skovlunde, Denmark

Leitra is a Danish company and also the name of the velomobile it produces.

In Sweden designs for a two-person, four-wheeled velomobile called the Fantom were sold as blueprints in the 1930s and 40s. Many thousands of sets of DIY instructions were sold, but very few vehicles were actually built. The body was made of plywood.

The oil shock of 1978-9 inspired Carl Georg Rasmussen, a Danish engineer and pilot, to design and build the first practical velomobile. A tadpole recumbent tricycle with full glass-fiber fairing, it was dubbed the Leitra (Danish: Let individuel transport, meaning "light individual transport").

== About the company ==
Carl Georg Rasmussen initially formed the company as a limited partnership with ten investors – mostly friends and intending customers. He also received some of his early funding from other customers who, while not wishing to risk a direct investment in the company, were nevertheless prepared to make an advance purchase. This enabled Rasmussen to start work on an initial run of twelve Leitras in 1983.

Due to Carl Georg having some minor health issues plus a lack of demand for new Leitras for nearly 10 years, the holding company Leitra ApS stopped operations in 2024.

== About the Leitra velomobile ==
The Leitra is a three-wheeled, non-motorized vehicle designed for commuting, shopping, distribution of light goods, recreation, and touring. The international term for this type of vehicle is a velomobile. It is fast, but not designed specifically for racing.

The primary considerations for the design of such a tricycle with full fairing were:

- Safety in normal traffic,
- Cycling comfort in cold, windy, and wet weather,
- Sufficient payload for touring and shopping,
- Reliability in daily operation – including in wintertime.

For fair weather use the fairing can be removed in moments by means of a toe-activated snap coupling. The two luggage compartments can also be removed quickly without tools.

The Leitra was approved by the Danish authorities for general use after systematic tests in 1982. Approval was given on the condition that the cyclist must be able to give unhindered arm signals for turning and stopping. This explains the characteristic open design of the fairing with soft fabric on both sides. The design of the built-in rearview mirror on top of the fairing was also approved by the Danish authorities.

The first Leitra was built in 1980. Since 1982 it has successfully participated in many tough rallies in Europe, such as Trondheim - Oslo (1983) and Paris-Brest-Paris (1987). It has proven to be a real practical vehicle for long-distance touring. Several million kilometers have been covered without personal injuries.

In 2013 development began on the Leitra Wildcat – a detachable fairing designed to fit most any kind of recumbent trike. Currently the Steintrike Nomad, Terratrike, TW Bent, and Leitra Sport have all been adapted to use the Wildcat fairing.

As of 2015, approximately 260 Leitras had been produced. Production was on an order-by-order basis, as each Leitra was built for a specific customer. By this time production had slowed to about one Leitra per year, but renovation and repairs continued on velomobiles that make their way back to the company's second workshop in Herlev – a suburb of Copenhagen.

As of summer 2025, the current Leitra workshop in Skovlunde, Denmark - just west of Copenhagen on the site of an historical blacksmith's workshop from the 1850's - offers spare parts and minor repairs with accommodation for visiting velomobile-, recumbent- and cycling-riders who come from far away. No new Leitras or Leitra Wildcat fairings are expected to be produced at this time.
