= Bicycle fairing =

Aerodynamic shell for bicycles

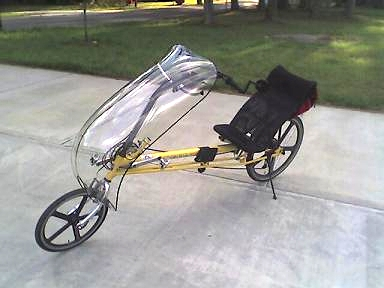
A RANS V2 Formula long-wheelbase recumbent bike fitted with a front fairing

A bicycle fairing also called recumbent fairing is a full or partial covering for a bicycle to reduce aerodynamic drag or to protect the rider from the elements. It is more common to see recumbent bicycles with partial or full fairing. A bicycle with a full fairing is a regular bicycle fitted with an extra component, as opposed to a velomobile, which is a permanently enclosed bicycle.

== Bodysock ==
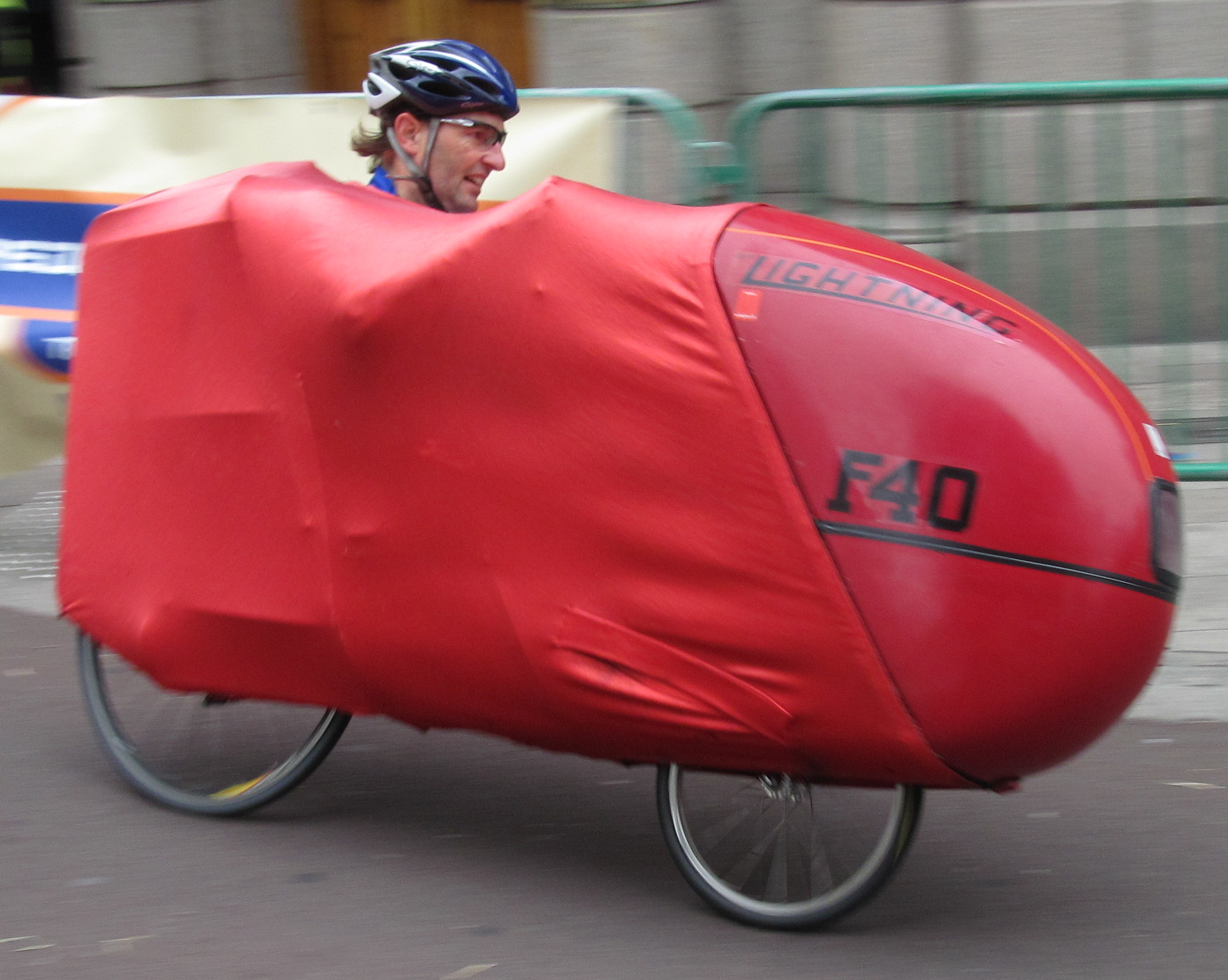
A bodysock attached to a rigid front fairing and over a rigid rear fairing frame

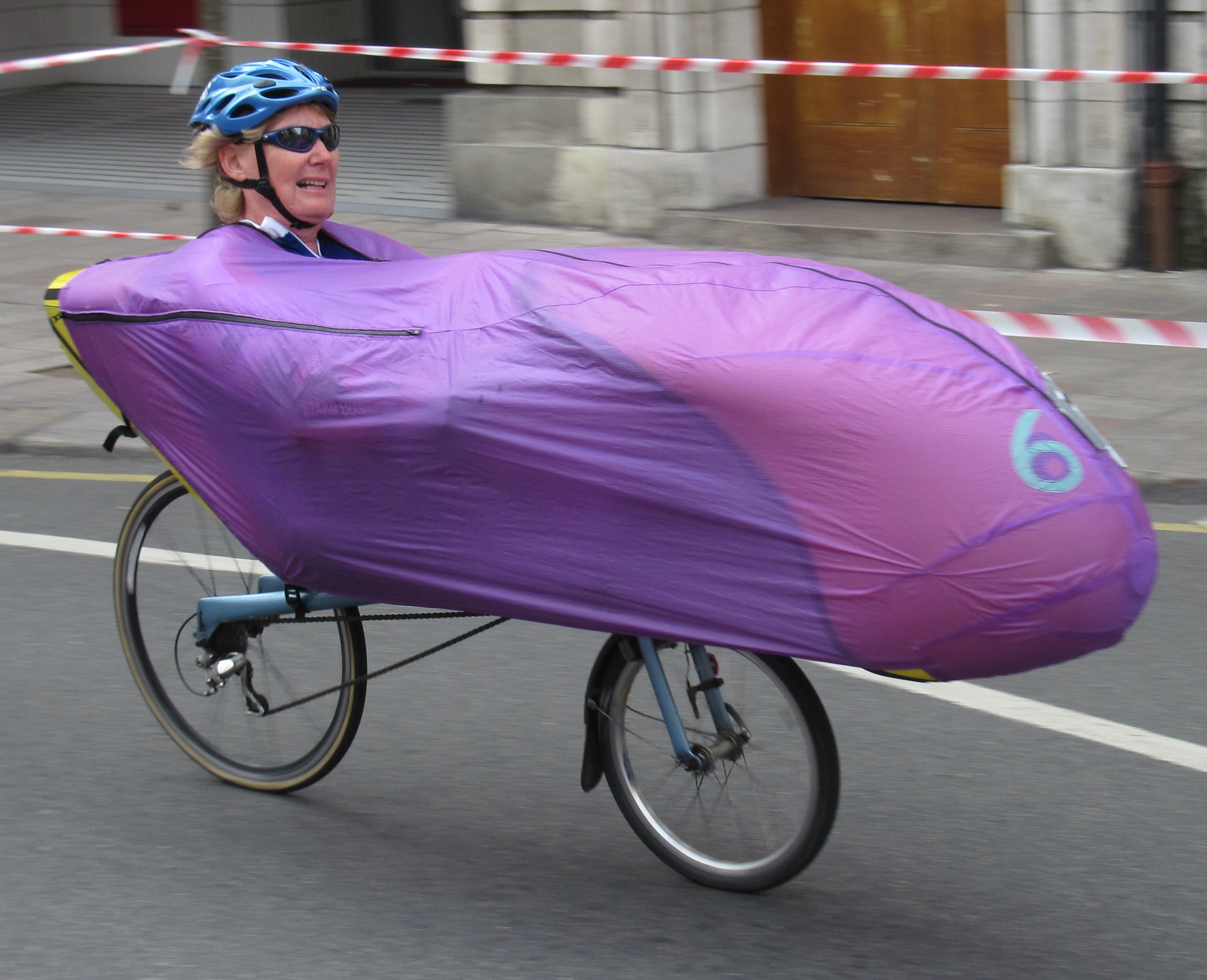
A shorter bodysock fitted over a rigid front fairing, and attaching to a rigid rear fairing

Fairings are available for the front and rear of the vehicle. Some riders also use a "bodysock," a fabric (usually lycra) covering which connects the front fairing and the rear fairing, enclosing the rider for even less drag. Socks can also be run from a front fairing to an A-shaped framework on the back of the seat. Or a "tailsock" can run from the back of the seat to the A-shaped framework. A tailsock using lycra fabric and small aluminium tubes adds very little weight. Front and rear fairings have been shown to be beneficial for long wheelbase bikes, but front fairings are less beneficial for short wheelbase bikes. Front fairings and bodysocks have the advantage of blocking wind and rain on cool days, and a bodysock can help block the sun on bright days.

== Aerodynamic benefits ==
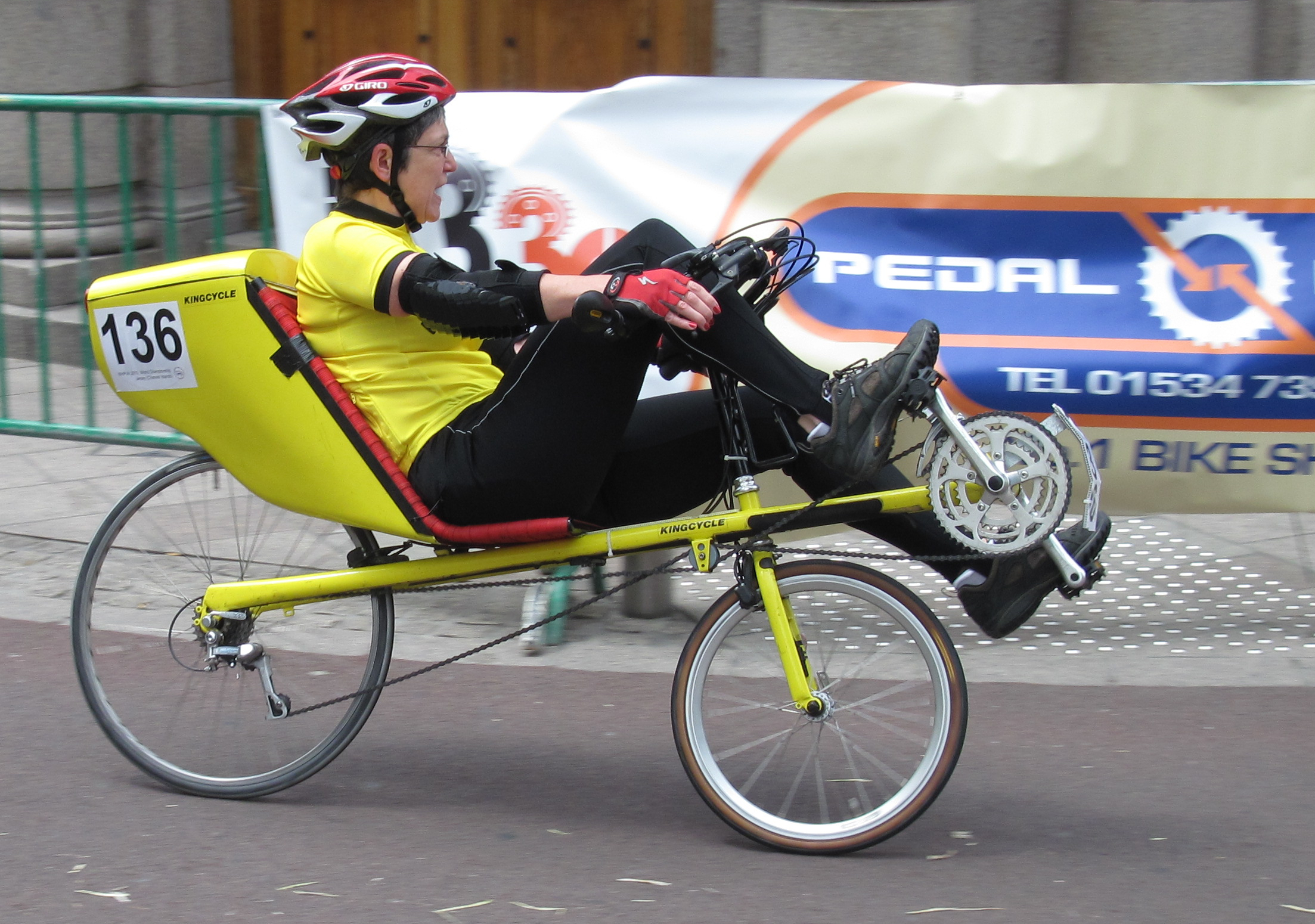
A simpler tail or rear fairing, no front fairing

Empirical results indicate that a faired tailbox can increase speed on a low short wheelbase bike by around 5 to 10%, but this has not been validated formally. The design of the fairing is important: a long, sealed fairing gives best compensation for the added weight; for road riding a tailbox may well not repay the weight penalty. The most exotic machines have lightweight full-body fairings, tested in wind tunnels, but these are not practical for street use. Indeed, the riders of many of these bikes must be taped in, and the bike launched by handlers on the outside.

== Velomobile ==
A velomobile has a fully enclosed body, is usually a three-wheeled design, and protects the rider in all weather.

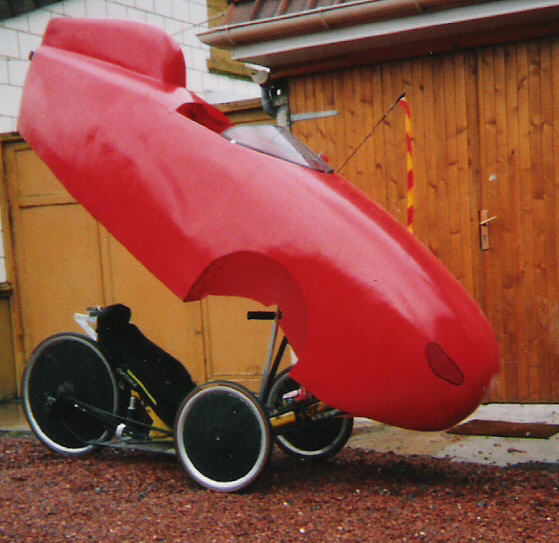
A removable velomobile fairing

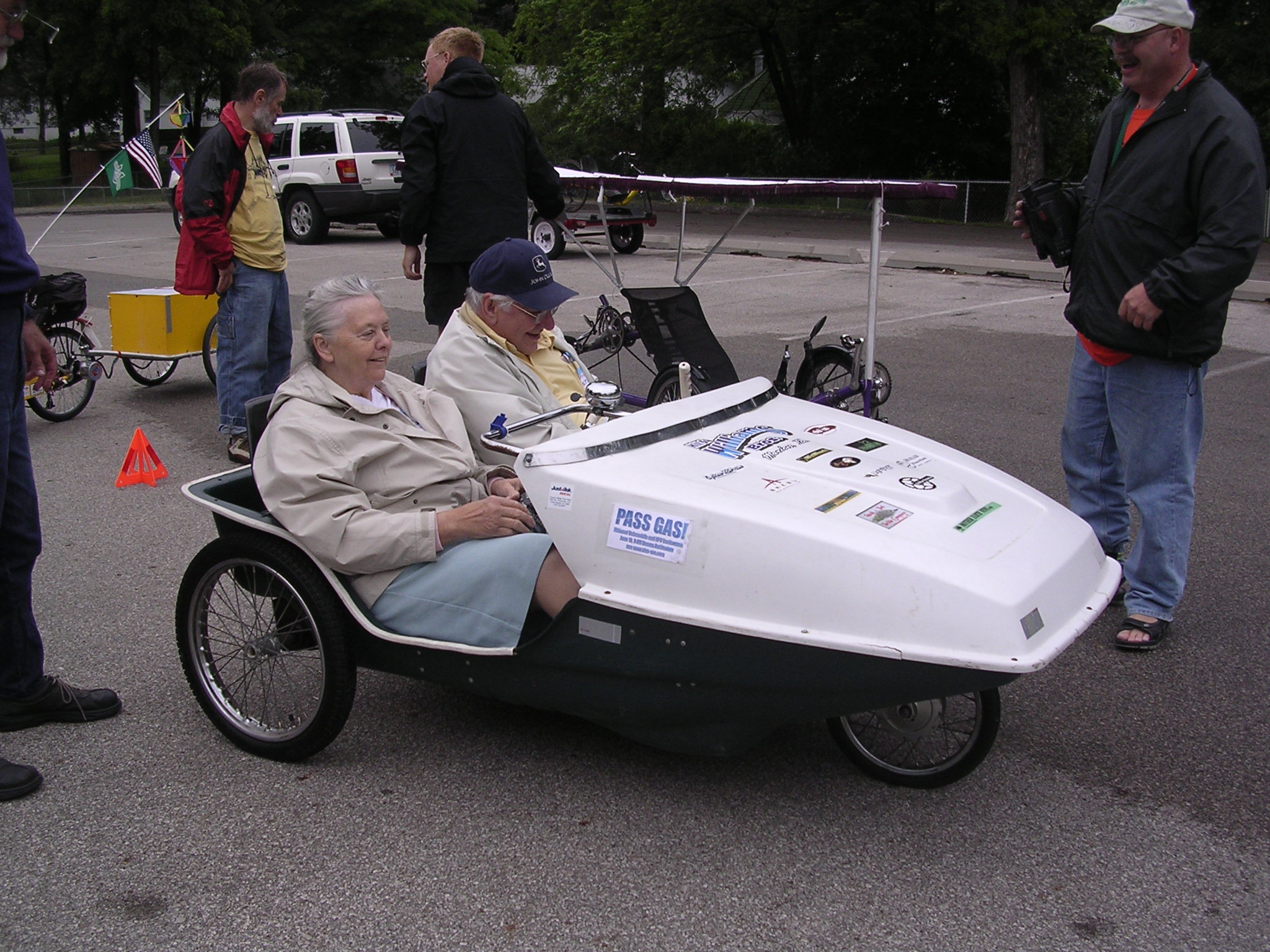
A velomobile with a boxy fairing

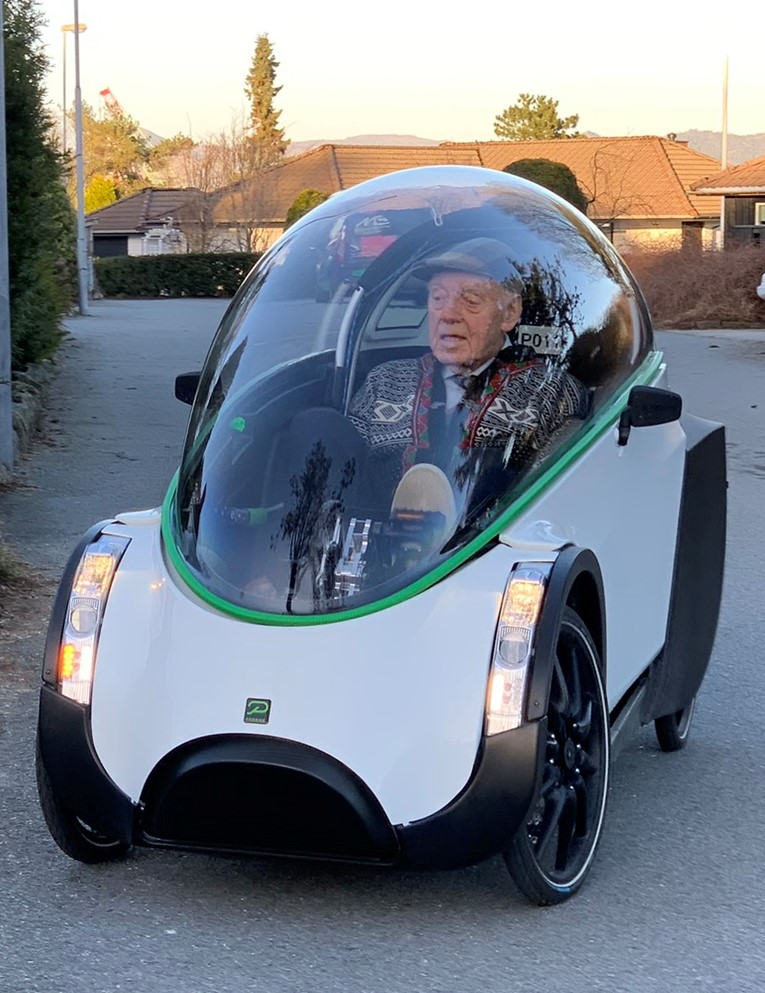
A fully-enclosed velomobile with a bubble fairing

== See also ==
- Bicycle fender
- Outline of cycling
- Motorcycle fairing
