= Cyclekart =

Form of gokart racing

CycleKart
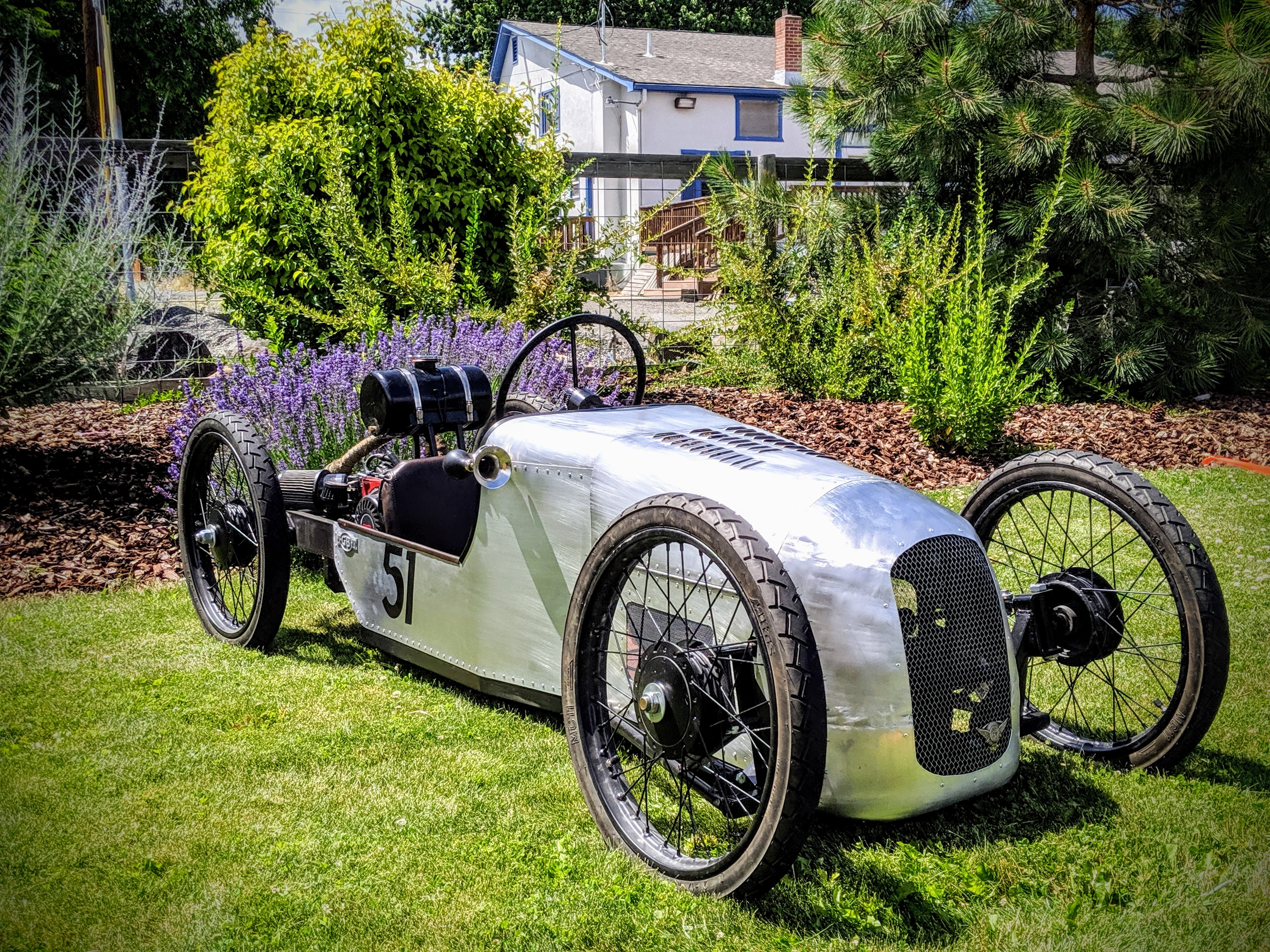
- 1927 Nash Legion Special cyclekart

Overview
- Manufacturer: Custom
- Production: 1995 – Current
- Assembly: Handbuilt, worldwide
- Designer: Michael Stevenson

Body and chassis
- Class: Go Kart
- Body style: 2 door Brooklands Speedster
- Layout: Rear-engine, rear-wheel-drive; Front-engine, rear-wheel-drive
- Related: cyclecar Austin 7

Powertrain
- Engine: Petrol: 200 cc Honda GX200; 212 cc Predator 212; 212 cc Ghost; 224 cc Predator 224; 212 cc TPP-212R
- Transmission: Comet TAV-30 Torque Converter

Dimensions
- Wheelbase: 1,676 mm (66.0 in)
- Length: 2,032–2,667 mm (80.0–105.0 in)
- Width: 991 mm (39.0 in)
- Height: 432–915 mm (17.0–36.0 in)
- Curb weight: 112–136 kg (247–300 lb)

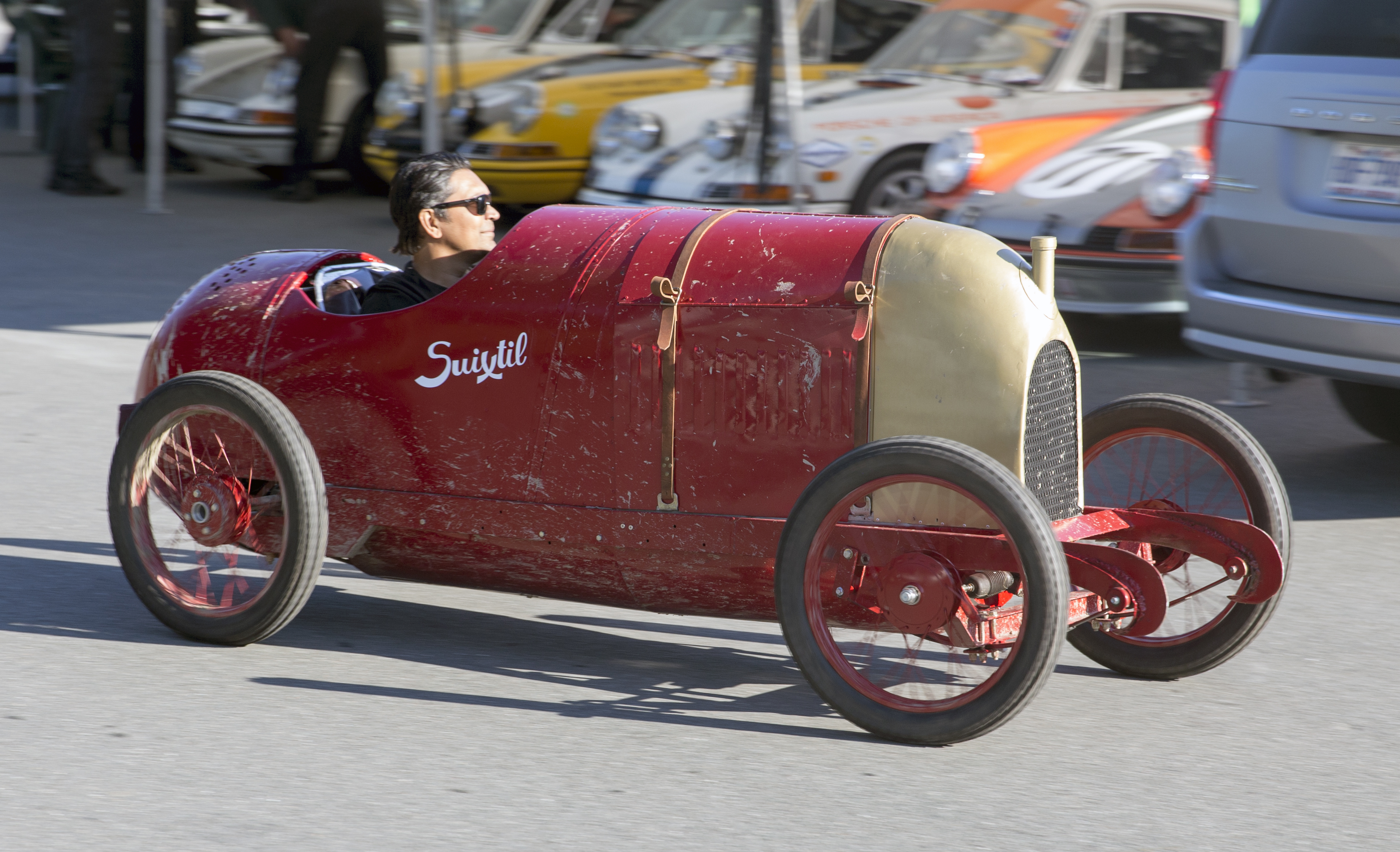
1911 Fiat S76 cyclekart

Cyclekart is a type of gokart racing where competitors drive single-seat, approximately half-scale, motorized cars styled to resemble race cars from the 1920s and 1930s.

== History ==
The first Cyclekart, as they are known today, was built in 1995 in Del Mar, California. An "At a Glance" specification sheet for the Stevenson "Type 59 Cyclekart" was formally published in the April 2002 (April Fools) edition of Road & Track magazine, representing the first published figures of any kind for the class, laying out the specifications for wheelbase, track, engine type, and transmission; representing the baseline for the "Stevenson Formula" that most future karts of the class would follow.

In addition to being published in national automotive magazine Road & Track in 2002, Cyclekarts were the cover story for the September 2022 issue of Road & Track in the United States in a larger issue about grassroots motorsports.

== Design ==
Cyclekarts are compact, lightweight, sports machines, homemade and handmade by their drivers in the pursuit of classic motor sporting.

The mechanical design is a simplified version of a cyclecar. The formula specifies that a cyclekart is as follows:

- A one-seat car
- Honda 432 × 44 or 51 mm (17 × 1.75 or 2 inch) rims
- 432-64 mm (17 × 2.50) tires
- 965 mm (38-inch) track
- Wheelbase as close to 1676 mm (66 inches) as the aesthetics of the car will allow
- Weight no more than 113 kg (250 lb)
- Powered by a 200 cc class, single-cylinder, 4.85 kW (6.5 hp) Honda or Honda Clone OHV engine (the GX200 or Predator 212)

A cyclekart should not cost more than $2100 to build in 2012 dollars and the drivers are required to build their own cars. Power is transmitted via a Comet TAV-30 or clone torque converter unit to the rear axle. Braking is also on this same axle by disc brake.

== See also ==
- Velomobile
