= Quatrevelo =

Velomobile model by Velomobiel

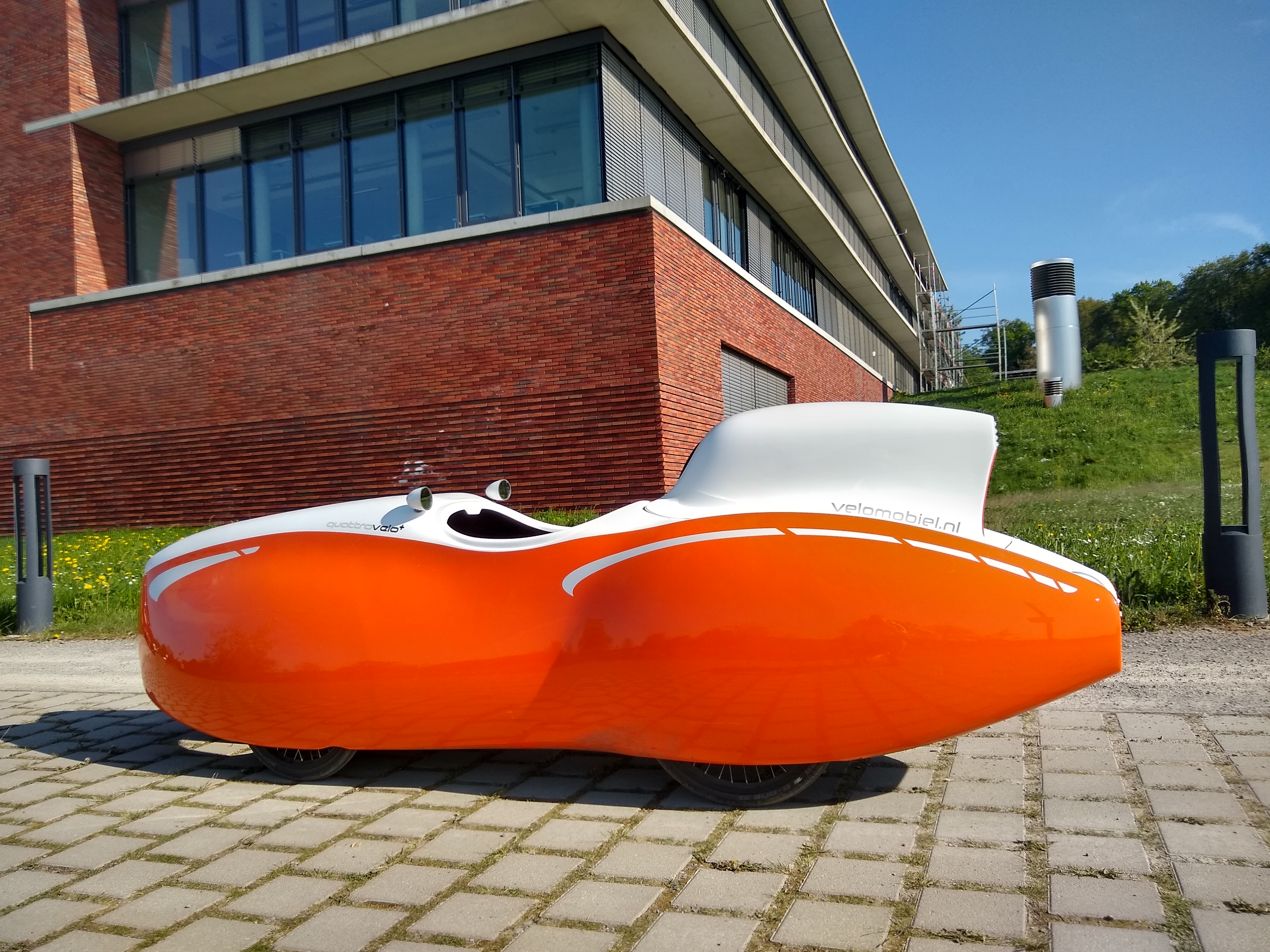
- A QuattroVeloPlus
- Type: Velomobile
- Inception: 2016
- Manufacturer: Velomobiel.nl
- Available: Available
- Current supplier: Velomobiel.nl
- Website: en.velomobiel.nl/quatrevelo/

The Quatrevelo (formerly QuattroVelo) is a commercial-production velomobile which is notable for using both four wheels and also a highly aerodynamic fairing. The Quatrevelo is manufactured by Velomobiel.nl in the Netherlands, with the first production models delivered in 2016.

== Features and comparison ==
Velomobiles are a class of faired cycles. One "speed" class of velomobiles emphasizes fairing aerodynamics for high speed. Most velomobiles in this class use three wheels, and so it is instructive to compare the four-wheel Quatrevelo against three-wheel designs.

"Speed" velomobiles (compared to "cargo" velomobiles) are limited mainly by aerodynamics and rolling drag. Thus, "low aerodynamic drag" has long been a focus for such designs.

Three-wheel designs tend to have better aerodynamics than four-wheel designs:

- Wheels are disks, and thus not very aerodynamic compared to a teardrop or other aerodynamic shapes.
- There are significant aerodynamic losses where each wheel enters the fairing.
- A two-in-front one-in-rear "tadpole" configuration means the velomobile can be narrow in the rear and thus approximate a teardrop shape, such as a Kamm tail.

Beyond aerodynamics, three wheels instead of four has other advantages:

- Three wheels weigh less than four.
- Pairs of wheels can be misaligned (toe in or toe out) so they track in slightly different directions, and thus must slip or "scrub" slightly as they roll which causes drag. If a single wheel is misaligned it can steer the vehicle, but does not cause drag.

Three wheels have at least three significant disadvantages compared to four:

- Three-wheel cornering stability is much worse than a four-wheel vehicle of similar width. In one comparison, the three-wheeler tips at about 70% the cornering force of the four-wheeler.
- Loss of traction of a single rear wheel, even while going straight, can cause roll-over accidents, with some serious injuries reported, whereas with a pair of wheels, one wheel can lose traction but the other still provides some direction control.
- The centrally located rear wheel makes it difficult to make a large luggage area. Three-wheel velomobiles have enough space for sporting use (spare clothes, a few tools), but limited for transportation/utility use (shopping, carrying tools etc. to work).

For the above reasons, most "aerodynamic"-class velomobiles have used a tadpole tricycle configuration, while most four-wheel velomobiles have been used for "transportation"- and "cargo"-class velomobiles.

== Development ==
In 2009, Miles Kingsbury was racing a tadpole tricycle velomobile, and often lost to a competitor riding a streamliner (which Kingsbury had designed and built). Kingsbury concluded one reason he lost to the streamliner was limited cornering stability of his tricycle. He calculated that it was plausible to build a 4-wheel velomobile which would both have the needed stability and also have good enough aerodynamics to be competitive. He then designed and built a 4-wheel velomobile, which he called the Quattro.

Kingsbury finished just in time to ship it to the US to participate in ROAM, a group of several dozen velomobile riders riding from coast to coast. Several ROAM riders were impressed that Kingsbury in his Quattro had good cornering stability; was able to keep pace with riders with "aerodynamic"-class velomobiles; and had much larger storage volume—an issue of practical value for velomobiles used for everyday transportation.

This led several velomobile designers to re-consider 4 wheels for aerodynamic velomobiles—despite the inherent drag losses of 4 wheels compared to three. Velomobiles.nl claims for a given width, four wheels offer 40% higher cornering stability than a tadpole tricycle of similar width and center of gravity. Or, a tricycle would need to be 40% wider to get the same stability; but since air drag is directly related to frontal area, making the tricycle wide would directly hurt aerodynamics.

As of May 2017 there are several projects by various makers to introduce "aerodynamic"-class 4-wheel velomobiles; the Quatrevelo is of special interest because (as of May 2017) tens of units are in the hands of private owners and so can be used for independent testing.

== Comparison ==
The Quatrevelo may be compared against other "aerodynamic"-class velomobiles. As of 2024, some of the fastest tadpole velomobiles are the Tuna, Milan, Bülk and Snoek. The Snoek is made by Velomobiel.nl, but the others are not. Production of the Quatrevelo is (April 2024) nearing 400 units, however the volume of independent tests is still limited. Several riders have both a Quatrevelo and another "aerodynamic"-class velomobile; and report in public forums Quatrevelo speed is nearly as fast as several "best in class" three-wheel velomobiles such as the DF and Milan.

Another comparison is cargo capacity. One practical use is commuting and/or shopping. A tricycle with a single rear wheel typically has two small compartments, one on either side of the rear wheel. A quadracycle can have one large stowage area between the rear wheels. A single large storage area is often more useful, as it can hold cargo which cannot be easily divided among several small compartments.

A humorous competition demonstrated that a Quatrevelo can hold 26 six-packs of beer in glass bottles Although the competition was humorous, it demonstrates the practical stowage capacity of the Quatrevelo is both much larger than most "speed" velos, and also large enough for many daily uses. Another use is carrying a passenger. The Quatrevelo is offered standard with a second seat for a small (non-pedaling) rider.

Most 3-wheel velomobiles drive (power) the single rear wheel, and a four-wheel velomobile with two driven wheels may have better drive traction. One reason is that many tricycles put about 1/3 of total weight on the drive wheel, while many quads put about 1/2 weight on the two drive wheels. Further, the Quatrevelo uses two ratchets, one to drive each rear wheel; thus, if one drive wheel loses traction, the other one continues to drive. Note this is different than driving via a simple differential, in which the loss of traction on one wheel causes the other wheel to stop driving. Several Quatrevelo riders are also riders of 3-wheel velomobiles and report online the Quatrevelo has much better traction and climbing on loose or slippery surfaces. There are two- and even three-wheel drive tricycles; so improved traction is not unique to the Quatrevelo, but it may be unique among "speed"-class production velomobiles.

An alternative to "more/four wheels" is a longer and/or wider three-wheel velomobile. A wider profile hurts aerodynamics, but smoother air-flow can compensate to a degree. At the same time, CFRP is stiff and strong enough that the weight penalty for "larger three-wheeler" is comparable to the added weight for a "smaller four-wheeler". As of 2017/05, a main example of a good-aerodynamics three-wheel velomobile with large cargo capacity is the Milan 4.2 ("for two"). The Milan 4.2 is not directly comparable to the Quatrevelo, as the 4.2 has enough stowage for an adult passenger (though no passenger drivetrain). The weight and aerodynamics of the Milan 4.2 are thus broadly similar to the Quatrevelo; and stability depends significantly on cargo loading and weight distribution.
