= People Powered Vehicle =

Brand of side-by-side pedal cycle

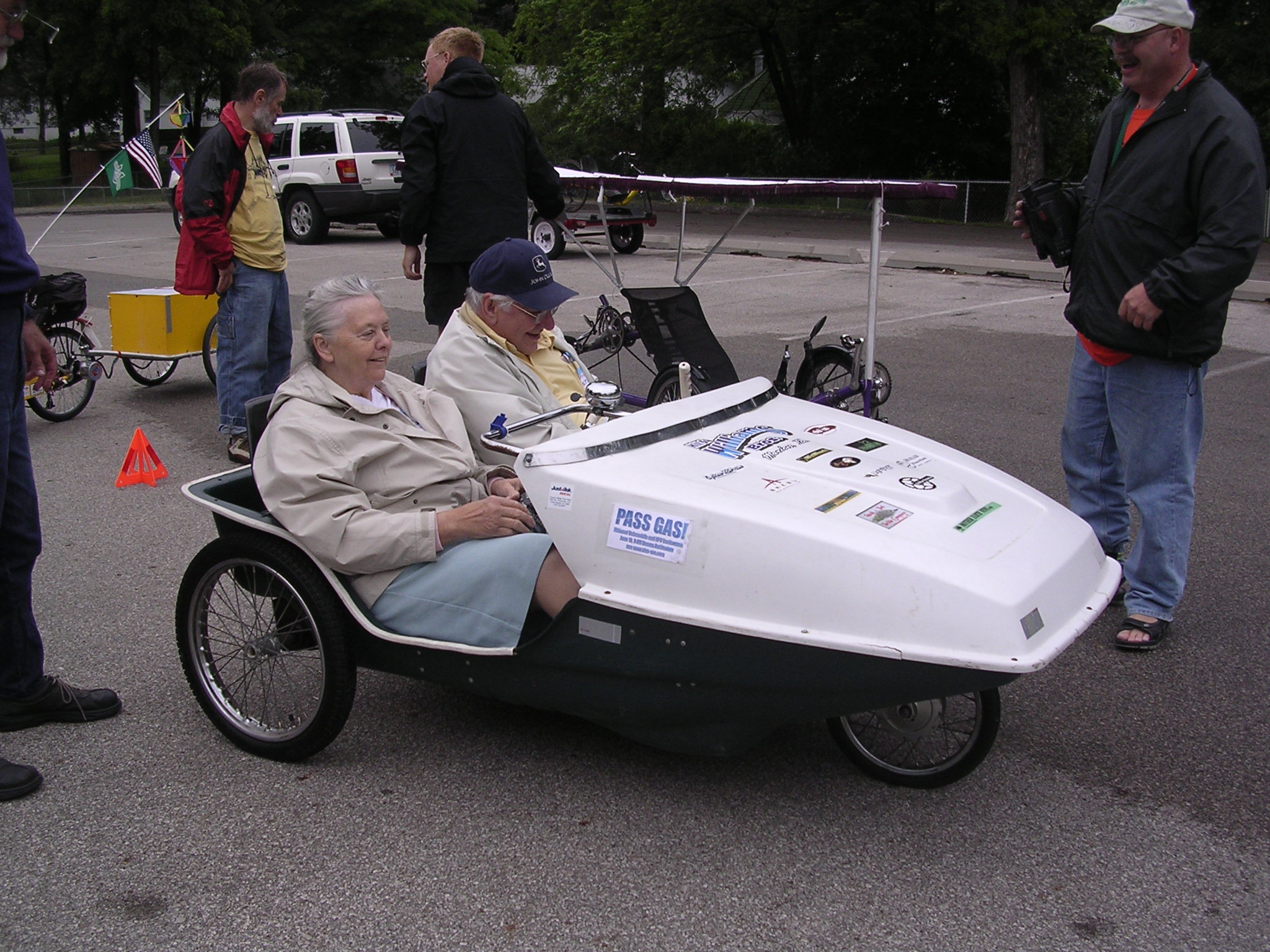
PPV being ridden

The People Powered Vehicle, or PPV, was a two-person pedal-powered car introduced in the United States during the 1970s energy crisis. Manufactured by EVI of Sterling Heights, Michigan, it sold for less than $400. Although it offered luggage space and was marketed as a fun and practical vehicle, it offered limited weather protection and was not fast enough to substitute for a car.

The PPV may be considered a forerunner of the modern velomobile. This tricycle was manufactured with a three-speed, floor shift, open type transmission with a single-wheel drive. Either the driver or the passenger could pedal independently or as a team. Reverse was accomplished by reaching outside and turning one of the rear wheels by hand. At one time, a rear-hinged, surrey top was available. Most were manufactured with a dark blue bottom and a white hood. Red or yellow bottoms with white tops were also offered. Sometimes bicycle accessories were added, e.g. squeeze bulb horn and a rear view mirror.

The PPV was designed for two adult riders, and with frame and body the total weight could approach three times that of a conventional single-rider bicycle. However, the PPV was fitted with just one brake, of a type intended to be just one of two brakes on a conventional single-rider bicycle (an Atom drum brake built in to the front wheel). Thus, even at relaxed speeds on level ground, the PPV brakes were dangerously inadequate.

An upgraded version of this vehicle is currently (2011) being offered by the International Surrey Company Ltd. under the trade name Impello.

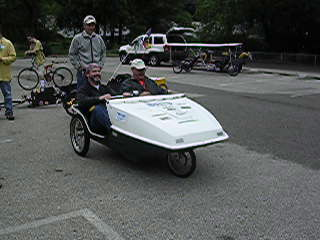
A PPV at a Human-Powered Vehicle rally

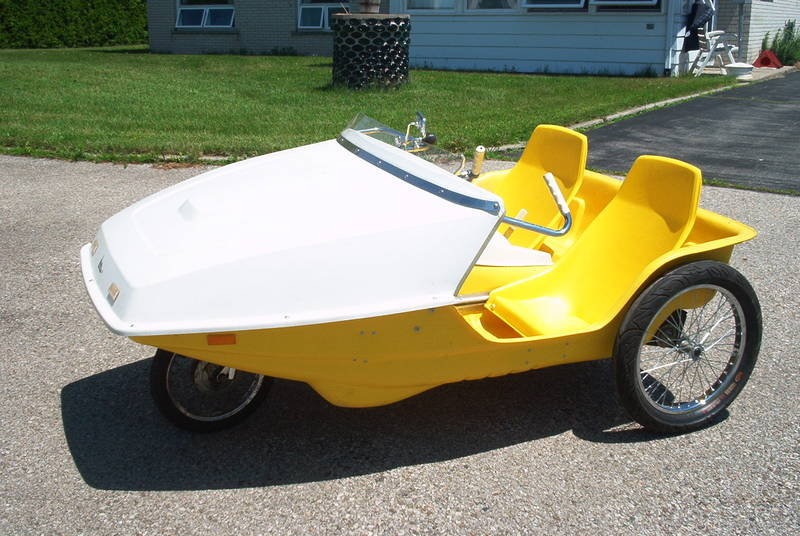
A restored PPV
