= Carl Georg Rasmussen =

Mechanical engineer, ecologist and a light aircraft pilot

Carl Georg Rasmussen is a mechanical engineer with a PhD in physics; an ecologist specializing in noise pollution; and a light aircraft pilot. He is the designer and manufacturer of the Leitra velomobile.

Velomobiles were produced in the 1930s, but commercial production ended after the second world war. Rasmussen's Leitra, or "light individual transportation", was motivated by the oil crisis; it is the first commercial production velomobile using "modern" materials and designs.

Rasmussen was interested in daily transport and tours, which guided his design choices for the Leitra. He last owned a car in the 1980s. Rasmussen had an early Leitra confiscated in 1982 by Danish police as a dangerous vehicle; this led him get legal status of velomobiles in Denmark. Rasmussen also organizes velomobile tours.

Rasmussen rode a Leitra in the 1987 Paris–Brest–Paris (PBP). Although the Mochet Velocar is French, Rasmussen is probably the first PBP velomobile rider.

In order to increase awareness of velomobiles and share knowledge, Rasmussen instigated a series of Velomobile Design Seminars. Since 1993 there have been eight such events, spanning five European countries. Topics covered include technical, societal, environmental and commercial factors. Illustrated proceedings from the Seminars are now freely available online. The ninth seminar is planned for September 2020, to coincide with Eurobike.

Rasmussen often rides 10,000 kilometers per year.
