= Velomobile =

Human-powered vehicle

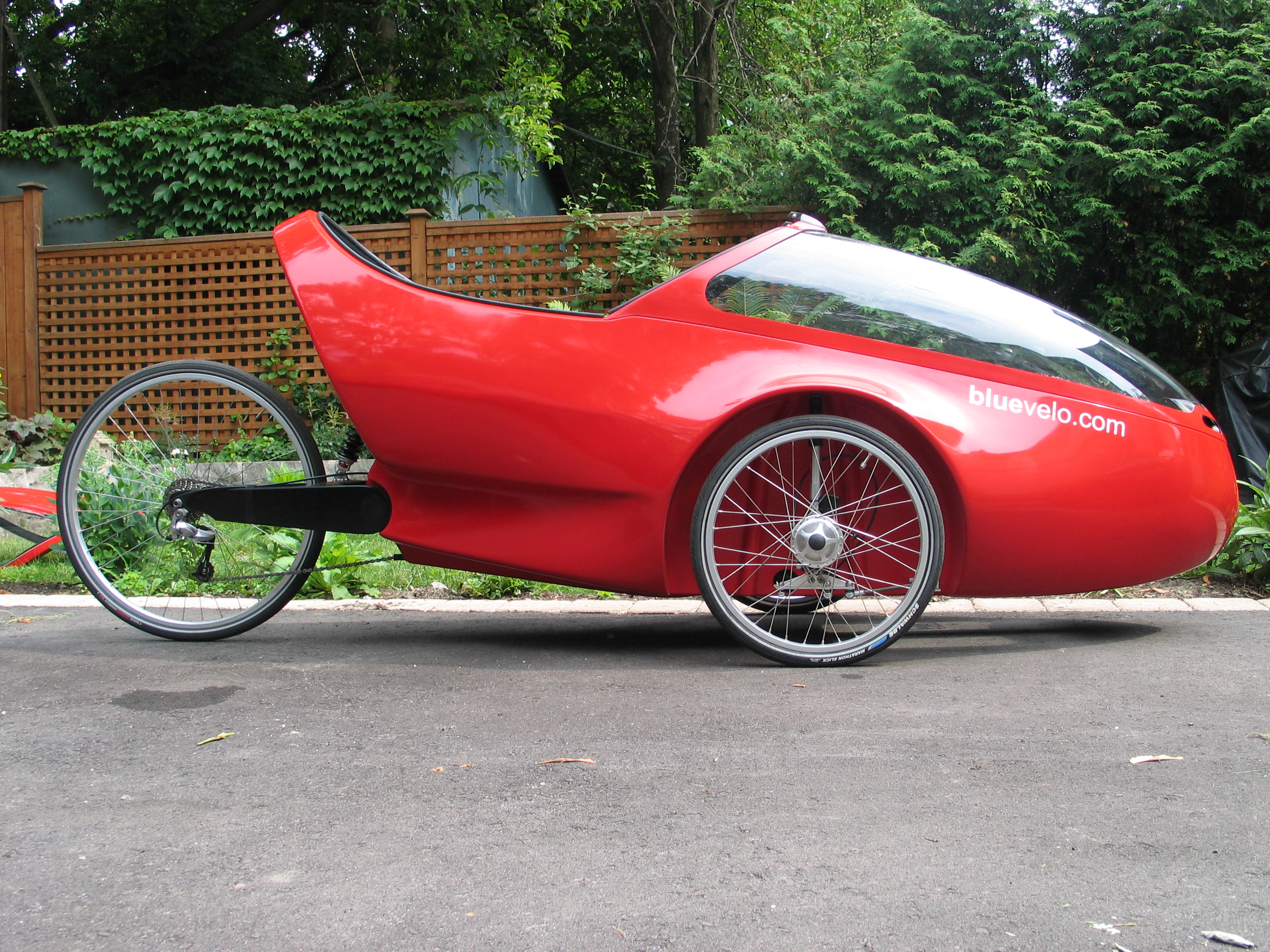
- Three-wheeled velomobile
- Classification: Vehicle
- Application: Transportation
- Fuel source: Human power, Electricity
- Wheels: 2–4
- Components: Wheels, Seat, Handlebar, Fairing, Chain, Derailleur
- Inventor: Charles Mochet
- Invented: 1930s
- Examples: Velocar, Fantom, Leitra, Waw, People Powered Vehicle, Alleweder, QuattroVelo, Sinclair C5, Frikar

A velomobile (/ˈvɛloʊmoʊˌbil/), velomobiel, velo, or bicycle car is a human-powered vehicle (HPV) enclosed for aerodynamic advantage and/or protection from weather and collisions. Velomobiles are similar to recumbent bicycles, pedal go-karts and tricycles, but with a full fairing (aerodynamic or weather protective shell) and are not to be confused with purpose-built mobiles for speed records. Fully faired vehicles with two wheels are generally called Streamliners and have set many speed and distance records.

Though fast in their own right, velomobiles are considered much more suitable for the street than two-wheeled streamliners. Using three or more wheels can have advantages for everyday use, including the ability to stop and start unaided, better stability, cross-wind handling, etc., though there are arguments made that the multiple track machines (three or more wheels) have aerodynamic disadvantages due to the drag of the extra wheels and the surface contact points. In practice though, velomobiles continue to be close to their two-wheel cousins in performance.

There are few velomobile manufacturers; some are home-built. Some models have the operator's head exposed; this has the advantage of giving the operator unobstructed vision, hearing, and some cooling, with the disadvantage of being potentially more exposed to weather and less aerodynamic. Fully enclosed machines can suffer from heat or humidity issues as well as potential noise issues.

The typical drive train of a velomobile is not unlike a bicycle or recumbent. It will consist of a front bottom bracket with one or more chainrings, and a rear derailleur. Depending on the configuration of the velomobile there may be any number of idler pulleys, and chaintubes along the drive train to manage and protect the chain. One of the defining characteristics of most velomobiles is that the chain and drivetrain components are protected from weather and the road.

Since velomobile operators usually sit relatively low they may be susceptible to dazzling from other road users during night cycling or winter cycling.

== History ==
Charles Mochet's Velocar

Before World War II, Charles Mochet built a small four-wheeled 'bike'-car for his son. Mochet built many models of small vehicles called "Velocar". Some models had two seats, most were pedal powered, but as the years went by, many were fitted with small engines. Mochet Velocars use a thin wood/plywood body on a steel frame.

Some other early velomobiles use a fabric body or "skin" sewn to fit loosely on closely spaced wires or tubes, then painted or "doped" with a liquid that dries and shrinks the fabric to a tight fit on the wire/tube supports. The approach was used widely on early airplanes, and has the advantage of light weight with relatively low-technology materials. It is sometimes called "bird cage" construction because the support looks similar to closely spaced wires used in construction of bird cages, and because the wire/tube support outline shows through once the fabric is tight. Some disadvantages of this approach are the cost of construction, due to the many interconnected supports; and that the shape is that of many flat panels, which limits smoothness of the skin and thus limits the aerodynamics.

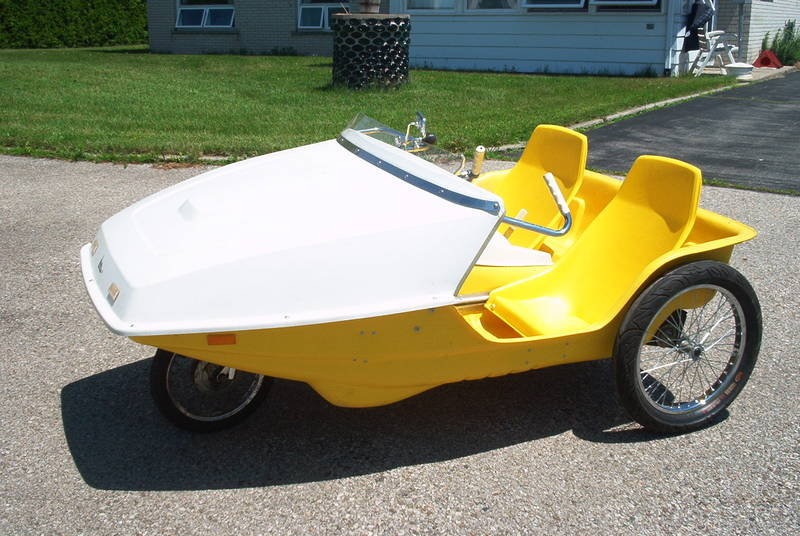
A two-seat People Powered Vehicle

In the 1970s, the People Powered Vehicle was produced. It was a two-seat, "sociable" tandem with a steel sub frame and molded plastic body. It was well designed and weighed something over 50 kg (110 lb); a recently restored version weighs 59 kg or 130 lb. However, it had flaws in the execution that doomed it as a practical, everyday vehicle. Positive features, such as easily adjustable and comfortable seats, independent pedalling for both passenger and driver, adequate cargo space and relatively good weather protection, could not overcome the negative features, such as a complex, heavy and badly spaced three-speed gear box, ineffective brakes, and pedals that slid on sleeve bearings on steel shafts, which made it difficult to use as an everyday vehicle.

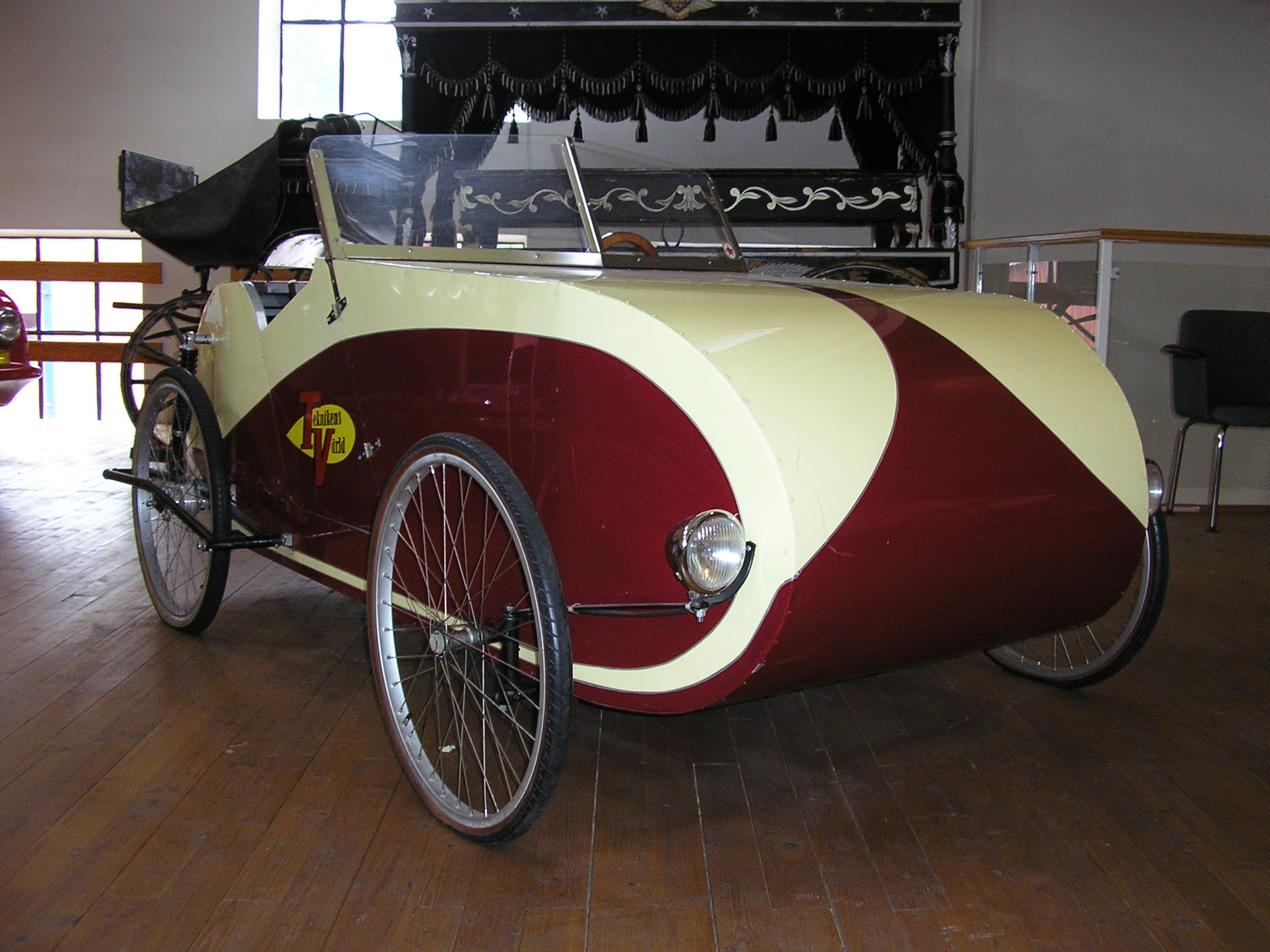
A two-seat open-top Fantom

In Sweden, a two-seat design called Fantom was sold as blueprints and became very popular; over 100,000 copies of the blueprints were sold, but few were actually completed. The downfall of these early 'bicycle' cars came when the economy improved and people chose automobiles.

== Modern/contemporary velomobiles ==
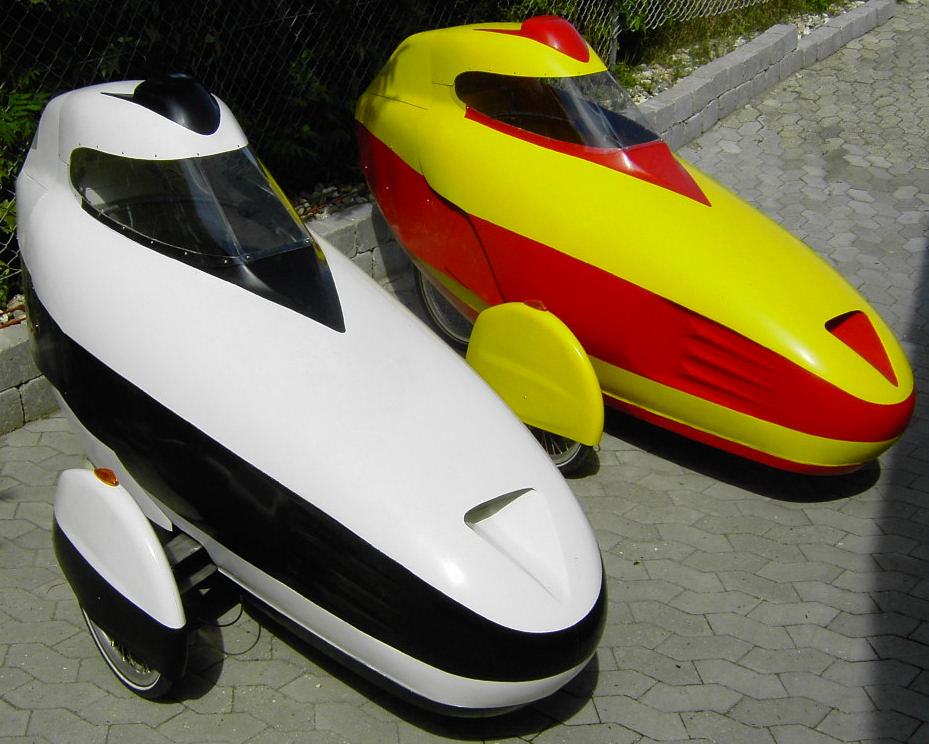
Leitras

Builders continued to make "one-off" velomobiles, but for a time none were available commercially. In the 1970s, Carl-Georg Rasmussen rediscovered Fantomen; he redesigned it and in 1983 started selling a production version called Leitra. Leitra velomobiles have been in continuous production since then (as of 2017), with current models evolved/improved from the originals.

There are many ways to build a velomobile. One modern design is "body-on-frame", in which a velomobile is made from a not-faired cycle plus a body. A standard cycle may be used, but often a custom cycle is used with special fittings to mount the body; the use of special fittings tends to improve fit and durability, and can also reduce weight. Body-on-frame construction allows flexible configuration: the body may be of any construction, as it does not need to be self-supporting, and various bodies can be used with various frames. Also, the body may be removed so the cycle alone can be used. However, the overall weight of body-on-frame is often higher than alternatives, as the body does have some intrinsic strength, yet this is not used to reduce the weight of the frame.

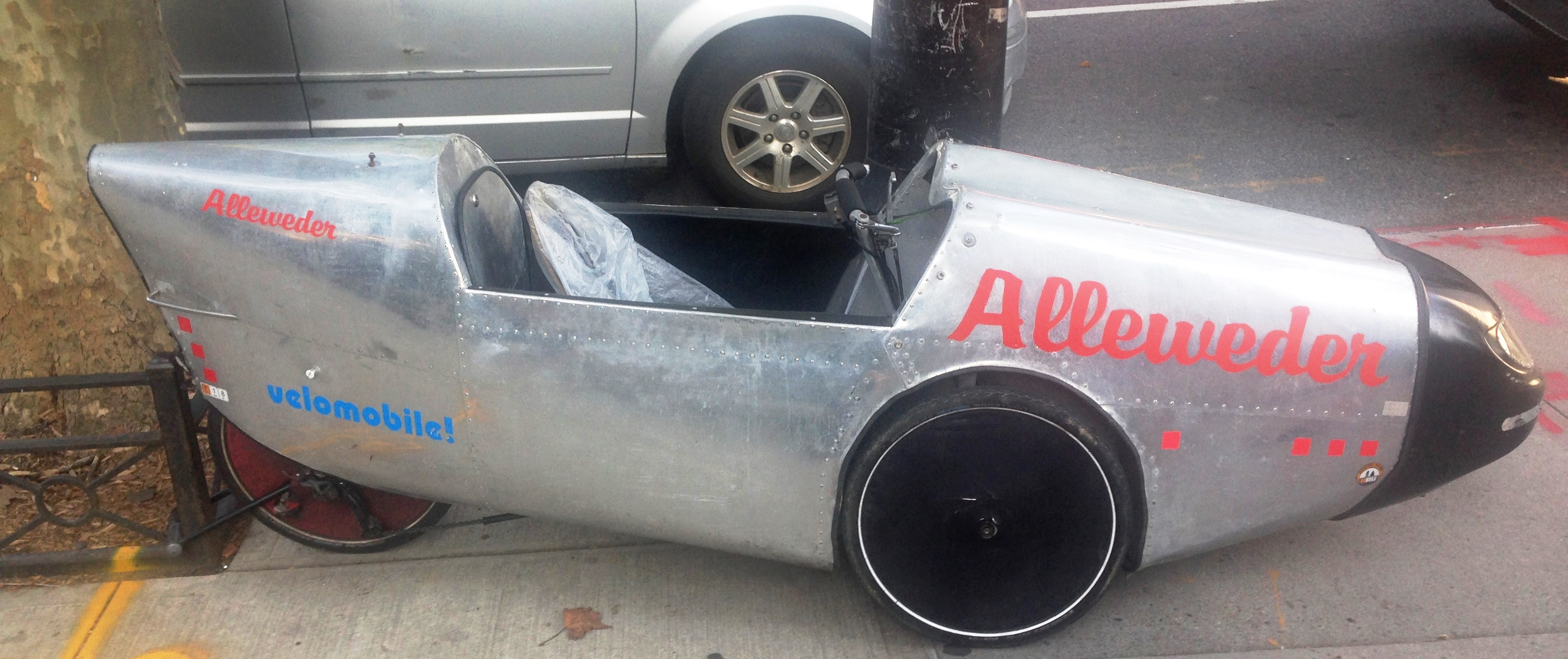
Alleweder Velomobile

Another modern design is the Alleweder, using aluminum sheet formed and riveted to make the fairing and the structure in one piece. This approach is sometimes called monocoque or "unit" construction; it was used in airplanes before 1920. Labor costs to build an Alleweder are significant due to the many rivets and rivet holes. Also, the choices of aerodynamic shapes are limited by the formability of the aluminum sheet. That said, aluminum is relatively inexpensive, and as of 2017 Alleweders can be often be bought for less than other designs; they can also be bought as kits, to reduce out-of-pocket cost. Aluminum can also be repaired relatively easily, and aluminum, which is homogeneous, can be recycled more easily than many composite materials.

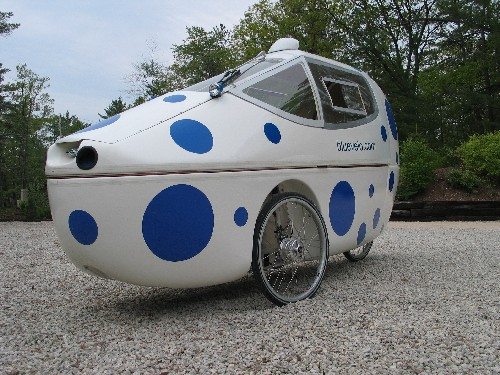
Cab-Bike

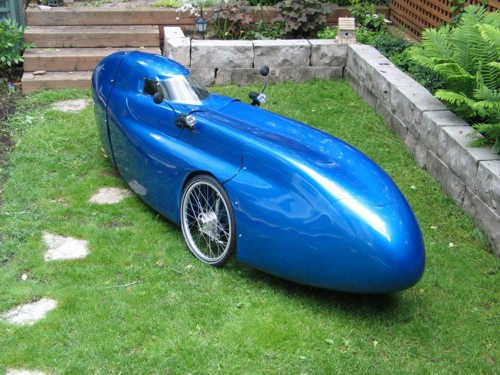
Waw

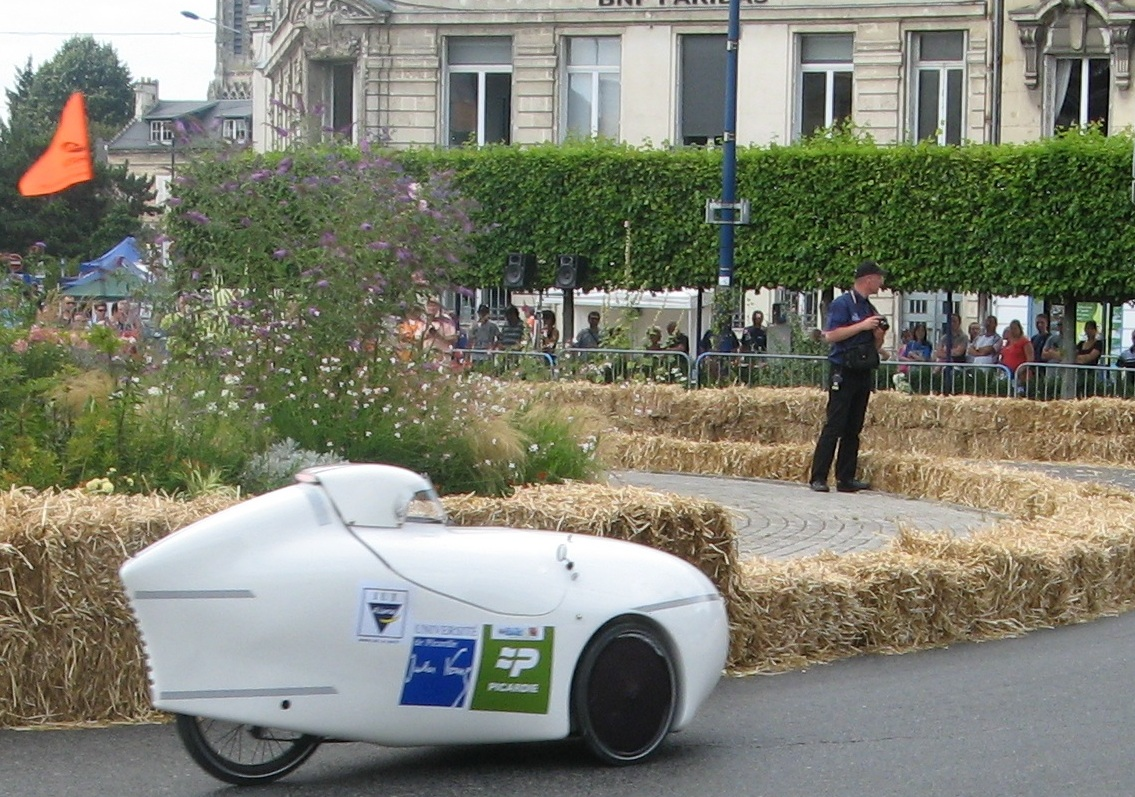
Leiba Xstream electric (eco marathon)

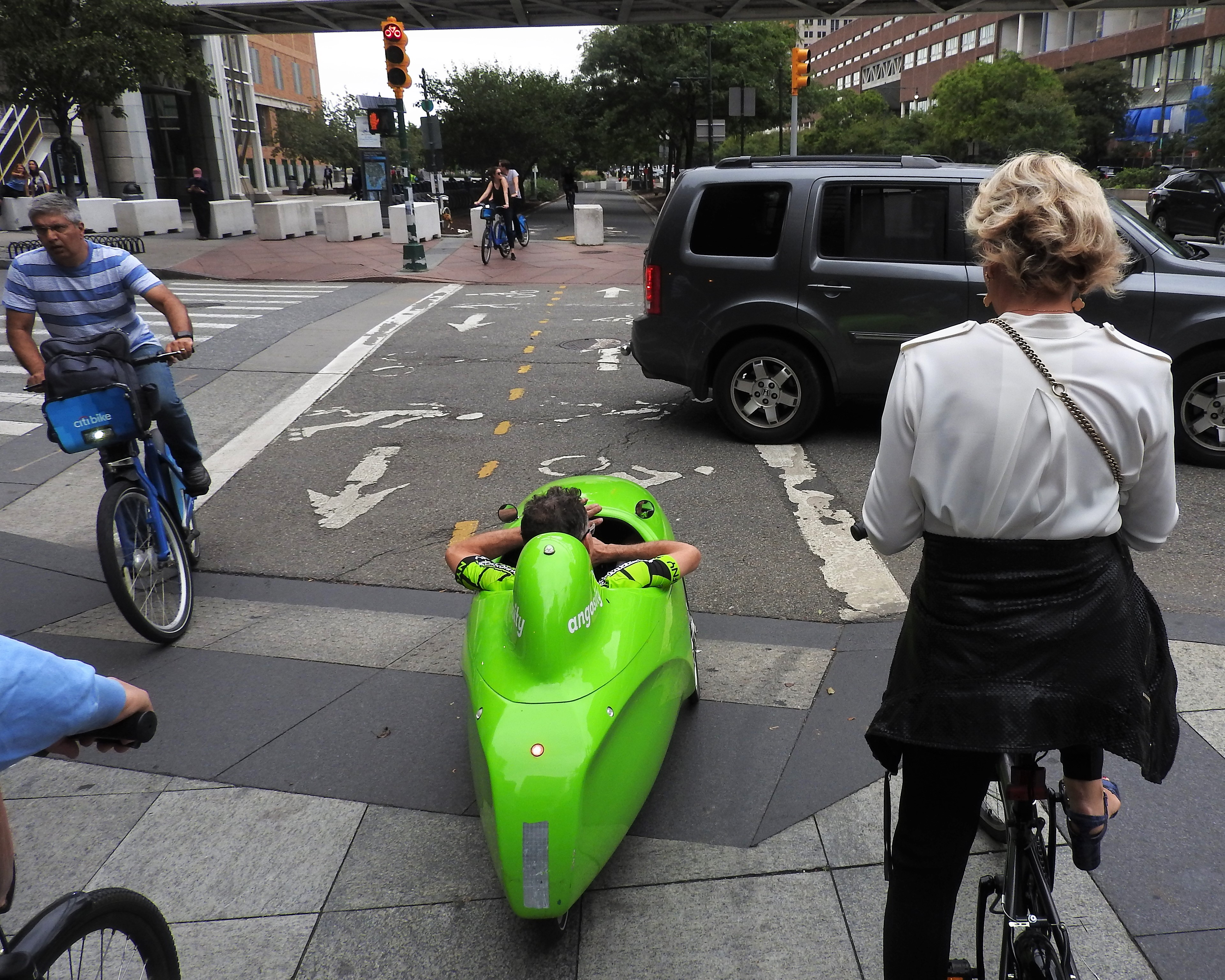
In use in New York, 2018

Another common modern design is a monocoque shell, often made of fiber-reinforced plastic or "FRP", plus sub-frames of welded aluminum tubes. FRP can be used to produce a wide range of shapes, and thus can improve aerodynamics over approaches such as "birdcage" and aluminum-sheet monocoque. FRP can also use fibers with high strength-to-weight ratio that in velomobiles can save several kilograms compared to other designs. A wide range of fibers may be used, but those which reduce weight while retaining strength and toughness often increase the price significantly—e.g., a premium of 1000 Euros to save 3 kg. In addition, it is often hard to segregate and recycle the FRP materials. But despite the cost and other issues, the aerodynamic and weight advantages mean that (as of 2017) monocoque FRP is a common way to build velomobiles.

As of 2017, most velomobiles are tricycles with two front wheels. A tricycle has the advantage over a bicycle that it does not fall over when stopped. In addition, when a cross-wind hits a fairing, it makes a big force; faired tricycles are less likely to get blown over than faired bicycles. Although three wheels have practical advantages, they also have more aerodynamic drag than two wheels, so land speed record cycles are often bicycles. Although four wheels were used as far back as the Velocar, they are not today common. As of 2017, there is at least one 4-wheel production model, the QuattroVelo. Four wheels tends to further hurt aerodynamics and weight compared to three; but for a given width, four wheels is much more laterally stable than three wheels. Also, four wheels can be placed in a way that increases luggage capacity a lot compared to three-wheel designs.

Most velomobiles drive the rear wheel(s). This approach is simple and can often use many standard bicycle parts. Velomobiles with two rear wheels may drive just one wheel, or may drive both. Driving a single wheel is the simplest and lightest approach. Driving both wheels can improve traction but also increases complexity, cost, and weight. A solid axle may be used, but increases friction/drag in corners and thus can slow down the vehicle. One alternative is a differential, which is the approach used in most cars. A second alternative is to use a pair of ratchets, where the slower wheel is driven and the faster wheel coasts. Rear drive often uses "idler" pulleys to route the chain; front-wheel drive can eliminate idlers, so offers less friction and also less weight. It can also increase luggage capacity. However, front drive with two front wheels uses some non-standard components, and as of 2017 is used only rarely.

As with other cycles, a velomobile may use suspension. Suspension tends to improve rider comfort, and can also improve speed—it takes energy to "bounce" the velomobile and rider, so a suspension can reduce the energy lost to bouncing. However, suspension adds cost, weight, and maintenance. Common velomobile designs include no suspension, front-only suspension, and front+rear suspension.

As of 2017, there are several commercial makers of velomobiles. At the same time, there are still many "one-off" makers. Individual designs (both one-off and production) emphasize specific features. For example, some emphasize aerodynamics and light weight to improve average speed, even if cost, ease of entry/exit, comfort, and other "practical vehicle" attributes are reduced. By analogy, many automobile makers make performance cars with limited seating and cargo and worse emissions and fuel economy. In contrast, other velomobile designs sacrifice performance features in order to improve cost, entry/exit, comfort, carrying capacity, and so on. By analogy, many automobile makers offer cargo vans. As of 2017, individual makers sometimes offer models spanning a range of features—for example, there are Milan models used in racing but also a Milan "cargo" model with enough luggage volume to carry a (not-pedaling) human passenger and other bulky items.

All current (2017) velomobiles are produced in low volume, with "big" makers producing one or a few velomobiles per week. Velomobiles use some standard bicycle parts, but also many parts specific to velomobiles, and thus made in low volume. The use of "more parts" (e.g., 3 wheels instead of 2) and "more low-volume" parts makes velomobiles more expensive. The only attempt at a mass-produced velomobile, which was in the mid-1980s, flopped. This was the Sinclair C5. The C5 was a delta trike (one front, two rear wheels) with electric assist designed to be mass-produced and sold for a low price. The C5 was poorly designed; it was heavy, had only one gear and had no adjustment for the distance between the pedals and the seat, which is important to get a comfortable pedalling position.

A concept and a potential assessment concerning low-cost velomobiles for daily short trips as well as strategies for reaching a critical lot size for mass production was the subject of a research project called RegInnoMobil.

== Racing ==
Velomobiles have also been used in Australian HPV Super Series since 1985, and more recently, other events in Australia like the RACV Energy Breakthrough, the Fraser Coast Technology Challenge, and the Victorian HPV Series.

In 2018, Dave Lewis set a new race record at the Sebring 24 hour race using a DF velomobile made by Intercitybike.nl. Velomobiles also competed in the ultra endurance Trans Am Bike race and came in 1st (setting a new record) and 4th places. 1st place was Marcel Graber and 4th Dave Lewis.

== World records ==
In 2010 the Milan SL was used by Christian von Ascheberg, to set a record in the 24 hours (1219 km) and 1000 km (19h27m) category.

In 2015 Petra von Fintel set a 24 hours world record at 1012km in a Milan SL.

In 2022 Nicola Walde set the current 24 hours world record at 1130km.

In 2026 Aidan Lampe set the current 24 hours world record at 1513km.

In summer 2023 Matthias König set a new 6 hour world record in a Snoek (388km) while Ruben Schütz set a new 24 hours record (1256 km) in a Milan SL Mk7 at the Record Weekend in Aldehoven.

== Comparison to other cycle types ==
=== Aerodynamic fairing ===
The velomobile fairing adds weight compared to standard upright cycles or unfaired recumbent cycles. For a given terrain, the added weight demands lower gearing and makes the velomobile slower climbing hills than its unfaired counterpart.

Some velomobile fairings are mainly for weather protection. However, if the velomobile fairing is substantially streamlined, then improved aerodynamics means the speeds on flats and down hills may be substantially higher than its unfaired counterpart, and often enough faster to make up for the slower climbing due to weight.

An aerodynamic fairing must be well-shaped, but minimizing the frontal area of the velomobile is also important to reduced drag: a fairing with half the frontal area may approach half the air drag. In turn, aerodynamic velomobiles use a laid-back or recumbent riding position, with the rider's head much lower than on regular bicycles. In turn, velomobile is much easier to accidentally "hide" behind a car or road-side shrubbery, fences, etc.

The fairing on a velomobile sometimes makes it more subject to cross-winds than a similar unfaired cycle. The effect of cross-winds is complicated because the force of the wind can act as a steering force, as-if the rider had tried to steer the cycle. "Wind steer" can be a safety issue and may also hurt performance, as a serpentine path is longer and thus slower than a straight line. Thus, a design with inferior aerodynamics may be better overall. For example, it is common for time-trial bicycles to use a solid disk rear wheel for best aerodynamics, and a spoked front wheel that has worse aerodynamics than a disk, but is less likely to steer the bicycle in a cross-wind. Velomobile fairings have analogous concerns, leading to trade-offs in fairing design. For example, a longer "tail" on the fairing will increase the total side-wind profile and total side forces, but can reduce the percentage force acting on the steered wheels and so an improve stability in side winds. A larger fairing also hurts weight and has more skin drag), but as with time-trial bicycles, worse aerodynamics but better handling is sometimes a good trade-off.

==== Weather protection ====
Velomobiles with fairings that are mainly for weather protection can use a more upright seating position. This tends to improve both the ability to see and be seen. However, to retain stability against tipping (both cornering and cross-winds), the wheel track needs to be wider than a comparable velomobile with a low seating position. In turn, this may make the velomobile quite a bit wider than a conventional cycle.

"Weather" protection includes cold and wet, but also shading from sun. Since the rider is doing work, it is typically desirable to have at least some cooling. Many velomobiles have vents and ducts which allow cooling while keeping out water; and the ducts/vents may be closed or covered in cold weather so the rider can stay comfortable even without a secondary heat source. In warm and hot weather, the fairing provides sun protection, but blocks the rider from cooling air, and so may be much warmer for a given level of effort. In some situations, a rider's power output (for any type of cycle) is limited by body temperature, and the worse cooling of a velomobile can limit the rider's power output more than on an unfaired cycle. With an aerodynamic fairing, the velomobile rider at reduced power output may still be faster than an unfaired cycle, due to the lower aerodynamic drag.

A velomobile's fairing shields the drivetrain from weather, as well as the rider. Drivetrain maintenance is often reduced compared to other cycles, especially unfaired bicycles, where the front wheel kicks up grit-containing dust, mud, and dirty water that lands directly on the chain and increases the rate of abrasive wear on the drivetrain—including chain and sprockets, but sometimes also derailleurs. The fairing of a velomobile tends to limit both the amount and the kinds of grit landing on the drivetrain. Some cycles use tooth-belt drive, which is less affected by grit, is quieter than a chain, and may be lighter. However, belts are only available in pre-selected sizes. Many recumbent cycles, including most velomobiles, have a long drivetrain for which no suitable tooth belts are available.

Velomobile bodies are typically light enough that the center of mass is similar to the center of mass on an unfaired recumbent cycle. This makes cornering stability similar to similar unfaired cycles. However, minimizing velomobile width also contributes to reduced frontal area and thus drag; so there is an additional incentive to make the velomobile narrow. The narrowest velomobiles are only slightly wider than the rider's shoulders, and so the width approaches that of an upright bicycle. However, an upright bicycle still has a significantly narrower "useful" width, as the road contact is in the center and so the rider's hands/elbows/etc. might overhang the edge of the roadway or path without causing problems. In contrast, the wheel track of a velomobile is very nearly as wide as the vehicle itself, and so cannot overhang the edge.

The steered wheels on a velomobile will hit the fairing if steered sharply enough. Making the fairing wider can give space to steer the wheels more sharply, but has down-sides for aerodynamics and width. Although sharp steering is not needed at speed, many aerodynamic velomobiles have a much worse turning circle than an equivalent unfaired cycle. In contrast an unfaired cycle cannot have fairing interference, and so even with the same wheel and rider configuration can steer a much tighter circle. Steering only the rear wheel(s) would avoid fairing interference, but it is hard to build a stable vehicle using only rear-wheel steering. The Velayo uses a tricycle configuration and steers only the rear wheel; but it is produced only in small numbers. The experimental Kingsbury Fortuna and Quattro velomobiles steered all wheels; this approach avoids some of the stability problems of rear-wheel steering while still reducing the steering angle of the front wheels. However, this approach has not (as of 2017) gained wider use in velomobiles.

=== Wheel configurations ===
As of 2017, most velomobiles use a tadpole recumbent tricycle configuration — mainly to reduce component weight and improve wheel aerodynamics. However, some use a four-wheel or quadracycle configuration. The extra wheel significantly improves cornering stability and can also improve luggage capacity. As of 2017 there are not many four-wheel velomobiles with highly aerodynamic fairings, but there are a few, and some riders report speeds are close to three-wheel velomobiles with highly aerodynamic fairings.

Two-wheel "streamliner" configurations can have much less aerodynamic drag: wheels are hard to make aerodynamic; each wheel entry/exit to the fairing adds drag; and velomobiles with two front wheels are necessarily wider or longer than the rider, while two-wheel streamliners can be barely wider than the rider. A common way to describe aerodynamic drag is "CdA"; in one comparison of racing cycles, there were several two-wheel streamliners with less than half the CdA drag of the best three-wheeler. Air drag is most significant for high-speed events; as of 2016, the world record for a 200-metre sprint on near-level ground is about 145 km/h for a two-wheel streamliner and about 120 km/h for any vehicle with more than two wheels, meaning the two-wheel vehicle was about 20% faster. Aerodynamic power is roughly cubic in speed, so at lower speeds the difference is much less pronounced. At the same time, two-wheel streamliners require a way to stay upright when stopped and at very low speed, and are more sensitive to blowing over in cross-winds. These factors limit the use of streamliners, despite their aerodynamic advantage.

Velomobiles for cargo use often have heavy frames to carry load, plus the weight of the cargo itself. In turn, the weight of the fairing may be relatively less important. Also, bulky loads often have poor aerodynamics, and so the quality of aerodynamics of the fairing is less important. This may enable use of a fairing which in hot weather can be converted to a canopy. A canopy provides no aerodynamic benefits, but improves cooling compared to a faired configuration, while also reducing sun exposure compared to riding without a canopy. Thus, a "high speed" velomobile may benefit most from better aerodynamics, even when aerodynamics hurts rider cooling; while at the same time a "high load" velomobile may benefit most from improved cooling (to maximize power output) even if that hurts aerodynamics.

Velomobiles are significantly bulkier than conventional cycles. Further, the bodywork typically cannot be disassembled much, whereas conventional cycles often can be disassembled to fit in a box or bag of dimensions similar to the frame. In turn, this makes velomobiles more difficult to transport.

Velomobiles are often built using some standard bicycle parts, but also many parts specific to velomobiles or even specific to a particular make or model. In addition, the bodywork is large and may be around half the weight of a velomobile. Thus, to reduce weight, the body is often made of lighter but more expensive materials. Also, production volumes are low, so for both parts and labor there are not benefits of mass production—as of 2017, many velomobile makers have yearly production on the order of tens or maybe a few hundred velomobiles. Taken together, these factors mean velomobiles are often much more expensive than other cycle types.

As an example of prices and price/weight tradeoffs, as of April 2017 the maker Trisled offers their "Rotovelo" model either with a rotational molded plastic fairing or with a carbon fiber fairing (as well as some other weight-saving changes). The body shapes and underlying framework are similar; the rotational-molded version weighs 33 kilograms and has a list price of Au$6500, while the carbon fiber version weighs 20 kilograms and has a list price of Au$10900.

Much of the cycle-related infrastructure design is based on the typical configuration of an upright bicycle. For example, multi-modal transportation such as bike/train/bike routes often use bicycle racks in the train, and the dimensions of racks and also the train ingress/egress assume a conventional cycle. Similarly, cycle paths often have bollards or S-bend paths to prevent motor vehicle entry, and the entry is often spaced for upright bicycles, but may be too narrow or require too sharp of a turn to allow through some velomobiles.

== Electric assisted velomobiles ==
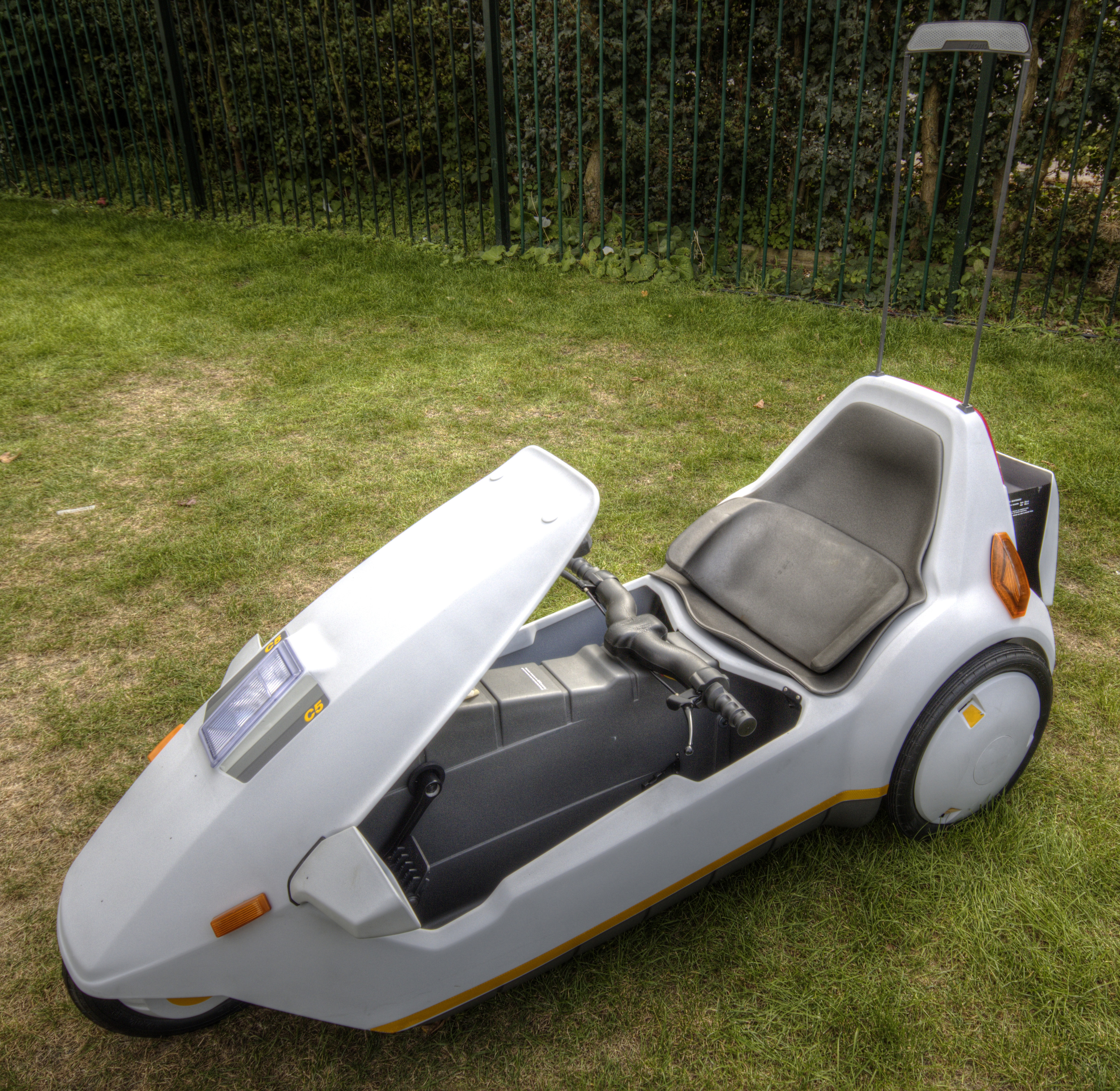
Sinclair C5

Some velomobiles have been converted to provide electric assist. Electric assist means that a small battery-operated electric-propulsion system is provided to assist the driver's leg muscle effort. Most electric-assist propulsion motors are of the in-wheel design in the rear wheel, such as geared hub motors (like eZee, Heinzmann, Bafang, BMC, etc.) and direct-drive hub motors (like Crystalyte, BionX, 9Continent, etc.) but mid-drive units (like Sunstar, Cyclone, Ecospeed, etc.) are used as well due to design constraints in velomobile models with one-sided rear wheel mounting like the Quest, Strada and Mango or front wheel drive in the Velayo, or better efficiency by using the multiple speeds of the chain drive or internal geared hubs (e.g. Rohloff 14 speed hub).

While an electric-assist unit does add extra weight to the velomobile, it is somewhat offset by the flexibility it also provides, especially during hill climbs and stop-and-go traffic. Due to vastly better aerodynamics of velomobiles the range of a similar electric assist unit and similar battery in a velomobile can be about 50% to 100% higher compared to upright bicycles or unfaired recumbents.

In events like the RACV Energy Breakthrough and the Fraser Coast Technology Challenge, there are entire categories dedicated to electric and other hybrid powered velomobiles.

The legal definition of "bicycle" often includes velomobiles, but laws covering cycles with electric assist vary widely across countries and often within a country and even between cities in a region. For example, a specific vehicle may be a "bicycle" in one area, a "low-speed pedal-assisted cycle" in another area, and a "moped" in yet a third. Similarly, going from 3 wheels to 4 wheels can change the category of an otherwise identical vehicle. One reason for the varying treatment is that many laws are older than widespread use of power-assisted velomobiles and so the laws were not written to consider such vehicles. In some areas, laws are being rewritten to include power-assist velomobiles and to harmonize treatment with nearby laws.

The Veemo, now produced by ENVO Drive Systems, is a semi-enclosed, pedal-electric velomobile designed to offer a practical and eco-friendly alternative for urban commuting. Originally developed by VeloMetro Mobility, Veemo was acquired by ENVO in 2023. As of January 2025, ENVO has shipped pre-release Veemo products to customers across North America and Europe, with plans to ship the first production batch of Veemo vehicles in mid 2025. The Veemo differs from many other velomobiles by focusing on comfort for city commuting, rather than minimizing drag for racing purposes, instead relying on the electric assist drivetrain to compensate for the added weight of the enclosed vehicle compared to a typical bicycle.

=== List of electric assisted velomobiles ===
Manufacturer	Model	Seats	Range	Weight	Special features	Status
Akkurad	Alleweder 6	1	120 km	60 kg	Streamliner. Also available without electric assistance, or as an L6e.	Small series production
BAYK	VeloTAXI	2	80 km	240 kg	Cycle rickshaw (also available as an electric cargo bike)	Series production
CityQ	Passenger	2	50–100 km	165 kg	Cycle rickshaw (also available as an electric cargo bike)	Series production
Envo	Veemo SE	1	50–100 km	60 kg	Assembled for Europe by Geobike MFC	Series production
Hopper Mobility	Hopper	1–2	50–90 km	155 kg	Door optional Cargo for 1 person, Passenger for 2 people	Series production
Karbikes	KOZI	2	50–90 km	100 kg	Cycle rickshaw (also available as an electric cargo bike)	Series production
Leiba	Classic	1–2	50–100 km	40 kg	Streamliner. Also available without electric assistance. Model Classic L for 2 people.	Small series production
Pedilio	Pedilio	1	70–100 km	70 kg	Roof with solar panel. Also available as an L6e.	Small series production
Quadvelo	QV	1	50–100 km	80–100 kg	Door optional	Series production

== DIY (do it yourself) velomobiles ==
With a growing DIY-community and an increasing interest in environmentally friendly "green energy", some hobbyists have endeavored to build their own velomobiles from kits, sourced components, or from scratch. When compared to similar sized commercial velomobiles, the DIY velomobiles from kits tend to be less expensive.

Probably the most built velomobile kits were the various models of the Alleweder made from prefabricated aluminium sheet metal due to its affordable price. Due to low demand, the Alleweder A4 kit was discontinued in 2020. In 2025 Passion-Velomobile in France restarted the manufacture and sales of the Alleweder aluminum DIY kit.

== Velomobile and recumbent Internet communities ==
Many amateur velomobile builders are also recumbent bike riders. In more recent years many online velomobile groups, some of them focusing on specific regions, have appeared, on Facebook and on other platforms.

== See also ==
- Alternatives to car use
- Bicycle
- Bicycle drum brake
- Cycle rickshaw
- Cyclecar
- Cyclekart
- Go-kart
- Green vehicle
- Outline of cycling
- Twike
