= Southern Independent Schools =

School group in Victoria, Australia

- Formation: 1978
- Headquarters: Seaford, Victoria, Australia
- Members: 14 member schools
- Official language: English
- General Secretary: Mr. Kerry Bolger (St Leonard's College)
- Website: www.sis.org.au

The Southern Independent Schools (SIS), formed in 1978, is a group of 14 schools in Victoria, Australia.

== History ==
In 1978, six southern independent secondary schools united to provide sporting competitions in swimming, cross country, athletics and weekly sport for students at their respective schools. In 1987 the association was officially and formally recognised as the Southern Independent Schools (SIS).

== Schools ==
=== Current member schools ===
| Member School | Location | Principal | Enrolment | Founded | Denomination | Gender | Year Entered Competition | School Colours |
|---|---|---|---|---|---|---|---|---|
| Balcombe Grammar School | Mt Martha | Geoff Roberts-Thomson | 862 | 2007 | Ecumenical | Co-educational | 2010 | Red, grey, white and black |
| Bayside Christian College | Langwarrin South | Andrew Manning | 568 | 1982 | Christian | Co-educational | 2021 | Navy and sky blue |
| Casey Grammar School | Cranbourne East | Fiona Williams | 930 | 1994 | Ecumenical | Co-educational | 2019 | Navy and red |
| Cornish College (formerly St Leonard's College Bangholme) | Bangholme | Nicola Forrest | 627 | 1987 | Uniting Church | Co-educational | 1989 | Navy and teal |
| Flinders Christian Community College | Tyabb | Cameron Pearce | 1614 | 1983 | Non-Denominational | Co-educational | 1992 | Dark grey, maroon and gold |
| Hillcrest Christian College | Clyde | Gregg Weaver | 1666 | 1981 | Non-Denominational | Co-educational | 2020 | Dark green and gold |
| John Paul College | Frankston | John Visentin | 860 | 1979 | Roman Catholic | Co-educational | 1978 | Navy and old gold |
| Nazareth College | Noble Park North | Sam Cosentino | 623 | 1986 | Roman Catholic | Co-educational | 1988 | Navy, maroon and gold |
| Padua College | Mornington, Rosebud & Tyabb | Anthony Banks | 2457 | 1898 | Roman Catholic | Co-educational | 1978 | Royal blue and gold |
| St Francis Xavier College | Berwick, Beaconsfield & Officer | Julie Banda | 3172 | 1978 | Roman Catholic | Co-educational | 1981 | Navy, red, white and old gold |
| St John's Regional College | Dandenong | Tim Hogan | 717 | 1958 | Roman Catholic | Co-educational | 1978 | Navy, green and gold |
| St Margaret's Berwick Grammar School | Berwick | Annette Rome | 672 (264 Boys) | 1926 | Non-Denominational | Co-educational | 2012 | Red, navy and old gold |
| St Peter’s College | Cranbourne & Clyde North | David Hansen | 1569 | 1987 | Roman Catholic | Co-educational | 1994 | Maroon, grey and gold |
| Woodleigh School | Frankston South & Langwarrin South | David Baker | 923 | 1856 | Non-Denominational | Co-educational | 1986 | Pine green and white |

=== Former member schools ===
| School | Location | Founded | Years Competed | Denomination | School Colours |
|---|---|---|---|---|---|
| Beaconhills College | Berwick | 1982 | 1986–2012 | Anglican, Uniting Church | Navy and gold |
| ICA Casey College | Casey | | 2010–2011 | Non-Denominational | |
| Stella Maris College [Now part of John Paul College] | Frankston | 1968 | 1978–1979 | Roman Catholic | |
| St James College | Bentleigh East | 1970 | 1978–2020 | Roman Catholic | Maroon & Gold |
| St Leonard's College | Brighton East | 1914 | 1989–2011 | Uniting Church | Navy and green |
| Marianist College [Now part of John Paul College] | Frankston | 1973 | 1978–1979 | Roman Catholic | |
| Maranatha Christian School | Doveton | 1970 | 1995–2010 | Non-Denominational | Navy and gold |
| Our Lady of the Sacred Heart College | Bentleigh | 1938 | 1978–1992 | Roman Catholic | Navy and red |

== See also ==
- List of schools in Victoria
