= Nazareth College, Melbourne =

Nazareth College

Location
- Noble Park North, Melbourne, Victoria; Australia; 37°56′24″S 145°11′43″E

Information
- Type: Independent comprehensive co-educational secondary day school
- Motto: Faith, Wisdom, Knowledge
- Denomination: Roman Catholic
- Established: 1986; 40 years ago
- Principal: Sam Cosentino
- Years: 7–12
- Gender: Co-educational
- Enrolment: c. 1,000
- Colours: Blue, red, purple, green, white and gold
- Slogan: Raising the bar through serving.
- Affiliation: Southern Independent Schools
- Website: www.nazareth.vic.edu.au

Nazareth College is an independent Roman Catholic comprehensive co-educational secondary day school, located in Noble Park North, a south eastern suburb of Melbourne, Victoria, Australia.

Established in 1986, the college currently caters for approximately 1000 students in Year 7 through to Year 12.

== History ==
Nazareth was established in 1986 through the collaboration of four local parish primary-level schools: St Elizabeth's in Noble Park North, St Gerard's in Dandenong North, St Justin's in Wheelers Hill and St Simon's in Rowville. At the time, it was seen that there was a need for a local regional college following the Catholic tradition, and hence, Nazareth College was formed to cater to students from the four parishes. A majority of the students at Nazareth College are graduates of one of the parish schools listed above.

Nazareth College has a day to celebrate the school called "Naz Day" in September. Each pastoral room hosts an activity and hires food trucks or a ride. For the whole school day, the school is transformed into a fun fair. Toward the end, around 1:00, the founding members return to the school for a full assembly and give a speech. Then the school talent show, consisting mostly of musical performances, begins. After that, school is dismissed.

Nazareth College's past principals have been:

- Paul D'Astoli (1986–1996)
- Gregory Clarke (1997–2006)
- Anne McDonald (2007–2016)
- Sam Cosentino (2017–present)

== Structure ==
Nazareth College comprises a Middle School and Senior School. Middle School caters to the students in Years 7–9, and the Senior School caterstor the students in Years 10–12.

In the Middle School, students must complete the core subjects (subjects compulsory to all students, including English, Science, Mathematics, Arts, Technology, and a Language subject) such as English, Mathematics, etc. In Year 9, students are given the opportunity to select subjects including a language (either Italian or Japanese) and a variety of other subjects.

In the Senior School, focus is placed upon the completion of the primarily academic VCE, or the more trade-oriented VM.

== Academics ==
Nazareth College senior students study for the Victorian Certificate of Education (Nazareth does not offer the International Baccalaureate), achieved after graduating from Year 12. While this is usually undertaken over a period of two years, rs the school recently instituted an acceleration program that allows gifted students to do, at most, one Year 11 subject in Year 10. A Monash University bursary is also awarded to the top student in Year 11 at each campus to help pay for the cost of Year 12 studies.

== Sport ==
Nazareth College is a member of the Southern Independent Schools (SIS).

=== SIS premierships ===
Nazareth College has won the following SIS premierships.

Boys:

- Cricket – 2000
- Soccer (5) – 2006, 2007, 2009, 2010, 2017

Girls:

- Basketball (2) – 2001, 2010
- Football – 2010
- Netball – 2003
- Soccer (4) – 2007, 2008, 2009, 2011

== International students ==
Nazareth College has fostered a large international student program, with at least twenty international students studying in each of the years 11 &. These students come from primarily China, Japan, and Vietnam. To continue to foster its international llinksnks the school regularly hosts students from overseas to study at Nazareth College.

== Student leadership ==
Students of every age have the opportunity to take up a position of leadership. Students may become a Class Captain or SRC (Years 7–11), a House Captain (Years 8, 10, and 12a), and Middle School Captain (Year 9).

In Year 12, students have a variety of leadership opportunities: There are 12 positions on the Student Representative Council (SR.); 4 House Captain positions, 4 Arts Captain positions & 4 College Captain positions. These captain positions are broken up into:

- College Captain (2 people)
- College Vice-Captain (2 people)
- House Captains (12 people, 2 for each house)

== Notable alumni ==
- Andrew De Silva, singer, member of CDB, winner of Australia's Got Talent in 2012
- Joanne Accom, dance, pop singer-songwriter and ARIA award winner
- Jonathon Patton, AFL player for Greater Western Sydney and the number 1 draft pick in 2011

== See also ==
- List of high schools in Victoria
- List of schools in Victoria, Australia
- Victorian Certificate of Education
