= Clem Splatt =

Australian rules footballer (1899–1963)

- Splatt in May 1925

Personal information
- Full name: Clement Reginald Splatt
- Born: 17 September 1899; Greensborough, Victoria
- Died: 18 May 1963 (aged 63); East Melbourne, Victoria
- Original teams: Diamond Creek, Greensborough
- Height: 188 cm (6 ft 2 in)
- Weight: 84 kg (185 lb)
- Position: Key position player

Playing career^{1}
| Years | Club | Games (Goals) |
| 1922 | Collingwood | 2 (0) |
| 1923–1924 | Hawthorn (VFA) | 19 (12) |
| 1925–1927 | Hawthorn | 20 (1) |
- ^{1} Playing statistics correct to the end of 1927.

Clement Reginald "Clem" Splatt (17 September 1899 – 18 May 1963) was an Australian rules footballer who played with Collingwood and Hawthorn in the Victorian Football League (VFL).

== Family ==
The son of Henry Bartlett Splatt (1863–1938), and Mary Ann Splatt (1871–1937), née Ely, Clement Reginald Splatt was born at Greensborough, Victoria on 17 September 1899.

He married Annie Doris Vera Jack (1905–1955) in 1926. They had two children: Valma Beryl Splatt (1927–1959), later Mrs. Albert Clack, and John Robert Henry Splatt (1932–1997).

== Football ==
A very tall player for his era, Splatt was a key position player who was noted for his marking.

=== Diamond Creek ===
Splatt commenced his football career at Diamond Creek Football Club where he played with Gordon and Syd Coventry.

=== Collingwood (VFL) ===
Clem and Syd joined Gordon at Collingwood for the 1922 VFL season, but Splatt only managed two games.

=== Hawthorn (VFA) ===
In 1923 he transferred to Hawthorn, who were then in the Victorian Football Association (VFA).

=== Hawthorn (VFL) ===
He continued playing for Hawthorn as they joined the VFL in 1925 and, playing at centre half-forward, was a member of their inaugural VFL side, which played against Richmond, at Glenferrie Oval, on 2 May 1925. Splatt was Hawthorn's leading Brownlow Medal vote winner (with three) in 1925.

Injuries limited him to a further five games over the next two seasons and he retired from senior football.

=== Hastings ===
In 1929 Splatt took a position as captain-coach of the Hastings Football Club (replacing the team's 1928 coach, ex-Fitzroy footballer Bill Thorpe) where he played for four years.

== After football ==
He subsequently took a position on the committee of the Alexandra Football Club.

== Death ==
Clem Splatt died at East Melbourne on 18 August 1963 and is buried at Springvale Botanical Cemetery.
