= List of people from Frankston =

This is a list of notable past and present people from the City of Frankston in Melbourne, Victoria, Australia. It incorporates the City of Frankston localities and suburbs of Carrum Downs, Frankston, Frankston East, Frankston Heights, Frankston North, Frankston South, Kananook, Karingal, Langwarrin, Langwarrin South, Long Island, Mount Erin, Olivers Hill, Sandhurst, Seaford and Skye. The demonym for a person from Frankston is "Frankstonian".

== Arts ==
- Rick Amor – painter and sculptor
- William Leslie Bowles – sculptor and medallist
- Raymond Boultwood Ewers – sculptor
- Walter Langcake – sculptor and woodturner
- Sir Daryl Lindsay – painter; director of the National Gallery of Victoria 1942–1956 (lived at Mulberry Hill in Langwarrin South)
- Richard Linton – painter, studio was formerly located in Frankston Central Business District (CBD) and is now just south of it at the Morningstar Estate vineyard

== Business and society ==
- Dame Beryl Beaurepaire AC DBE – philanthropist and women's rights campaigner
- Anthony Di Pietro – businessman and chairman of Melbourne Victory FC 2011–present
- Sir Laurence Hartnett CBE – automotive pioneer, known as the "father of Holden" (Hartnett Drive in Seaford is named in his honour)
- Sir John Holland, AC – philanthropist, engineering and construction magnate; founder of John Holland Group
- Wilbraham Liardet – early Melbourne pioneer (lived at Ballam Park in Karingal)
- Anthony JJ Lucas – philanthropist, businessman, consulate-general of Greece in Australia 1931–1946 (lived at Yamala in Frankston)
- Dame Elisabeth Murdoch AC DBE – philanthropist; mother of international media magnate Rupert Murdoch (lived at Cruden Farm in Langwarrin)
- Charles Wedge – early Frankston settler (Wedge Road in Carrum Downs is named in his honour)

== Entertainment ==
=== Actors ===
- Dougie Baldwin – actor, best known for his roles in Australian television shows Nowhere Boys and Upper Middle Bogan, also the Netflix show Disjointed
- Kaarin Fairfax – actor and director, founder of the Little Theatre in Frankston
- Sam Humphrey – actor, best known for playing Charles Stratton in the 2017 film The Greatest Showman
- Malcolm Kennard – Australian actor; played Ivan Milat in the miniseries Catching Milat
- Jackie Woodburne – actor, best known for playing Susan Kennedy in Neighbours, 1994–present

=== Authors ===
- Don Charlwood AM – author
- Paul Jennings AM – children's author
- Lady Joan Lindsay – author of Picnic at Hanging Rock, made into a film by the same name in 1975 (lived at Mulberry Hill in Langwarrin South)
- Myra Morris – children's author and poet
- Nevil Shute – author of On the Beach, which was partly set in Frankston, and later made into a film by the same name in 1959

=== Media ===
- Graham Kennedy AO – television personality, known as the "King of Australian television"
- Peter Mitchell – journalist, Melbourne news presenter for Seven News
- Mick Molloy – Australian comedian, writer, producer, actor, television and radio presenter who moved to Frankston from the ACT
- Mal Walden – veteran journalist, former Melbourne news presenter for Ten News

=== Musicians ===
- Gil Askey – American jazz trumpeter, known as one of the original "architects of the Motown sound"
- Vera Bradford – classical pianist, founded the Frankston Symphony Orchestra in 1968, and gifted the "Vera Bradford Music Collection" to the Monash University, Peninsula campus
- Cheyne Coates – singer, formerly with ARIA Music Award-winning band Madison Avenue
- Carl Cox – British DJ, 1997 #1 DJ in the world (lives on Olivers Hill when in Australia)
- Jay Dunne – lead singer with the hip hop/punk band 28 Days
- Lee Harding – singer, placed third on the third series of Australian Idol
- Simon Hepburn – songwriter and lead guitarist with the hip hop/punk band 28 Days
- Sammy J – comedic musician, born in Frankston, known for Randy & Sammy J
- Johnny Logan – currently Ireland-based singer; the first soloist to win the Eurovision Song Contest twice (1980 & 1987)
- Toby Martin – songwriter and lead singer of the ARIA Music Award-winning rock band Youth Group
- Kathleen McGuire – orchestra conductor, composer and activist
- Ryan Monro – bassist with the ARIA Music Award-winning jazz/ska band The Cat Empire
- Alasdair Murray – ARIA Music Award-winning rapper and recording artist known as "Illy"
- Dw Norton – ARIA Award-nominated record producer, founder and guitarist with the nu-metal band Superheist
- Michael Paynter – singer, made the top 16 on second season of The Voice Australia
- Brad Robinson – lead guitarist with the rock band Australian Crawl
- Dutch Tilders – blues singer, known as the "godfather of Australian blues"
- Andy Van Dorsselaer – ARIA Music Award-winning record producer known as "Andy Van", formerly with the band Madison Avenue, and co-founder of the record label Vicious Vinyl
- Toni Watson – known professionally as Tones and I, Australian singer and songwriter
- Nathaniel Willemse – known as Nathaniel; South African-born Australian singer and songwriter; finished sixth on the fourth season of The X Factor Australia

==== Music groups formed in the City of Frankston ====
- Australian Welsh Male Choir
- The Basics
- The Belair Lip Bombs
- Defryme
- Deloris
- Eddy Current Suppression Ring
- Frankston Symphony Orchestra
- Madison Avenue
- Superheist

== Government ==
=== Politics ===
- Hon. Austin Asche AC QC – 3rd chief justice of the Supreme Court of the Northern Territory 1987–1993; 13th administrator of the Northern Territory 1993–1997
- The Hon. Bruce Billson – member of the Parliament of Australia representing the Division of Dunkley 1996–2016; Minister for Small Business
- The Hon. General Sir Dallas Brooks GCMG KCB KCVO DSO KStJ – 19th governor of Victoria 1949–1963; general of the Royal Marines 1945–1949
- The Rt Hon. Lord Stanley Bruce, CH, MC, FRS, PC – 8th prime minister of Australia 1923–1929 (lived at Bruce Manor in Frankston, before moving to The Lodge in Canberra)
- Sir Harold W. Clapp, KBE – Victorian Railways chairman of Commissioners 1920–1939
- Chris Crewther – former member of the Parliament of Australia for the Division of Dunkley 2016–2019
- The Hon. James Fenton CMG – Postmaster-General of Australia (precursor to Minister for Communications), oversaw establishment of the Australian Broadcasting Corporation in 1932
- The Hon. Sir Rupert Hamer, AC KCMG ED – 39th premier of Victoria 1972–1981, anti-discrimination and environmental campaigner
- The Hon. Jeff Kennett, AC – 43rd premier of Victoria 1992–1999, mental health campaigner and media commentator
- Sir John Madden, GCMG – 4th chief justice of the Supreme Court of Victoria 1893–1918; lieutenant governor of Victoria 1893–1913 (lived at Yamala in Frankston)
- Jim Plowman – 28th and 32nd Speaker of the Victorian Legislative Assembly
- Tony Simpson – member of the Parliament of Western Australia, representing the District of Darling Range 2005–present

=== Military ===
- Rear Admiral William Carr, CBE – surgeon and medical services director of the Royal Australian Navy 1932–1946
- Grp Captain Charles Eaton, OBE, AFC – Royal Australian Air Force aviator in World War I and II, and consulate-general of Australia in the Dutch East Indies 1946–1951
- Major General Harold Grimwade, CB, CMG – commander of the Australian Military Forces, 4th Division, 1926–1930; and businessman (lived at Marathon in Frankston)
- Lieutenant General Sir Vernon Sturdee, KBE, CB, DSO – chief of the Australian Army 1945–1950; Australian commander of the Commonwealth Force in occupied Japan

== Health and medicine ==
- Ruth Bishop, AO – virologist, discovered the rotavirus in 1973
- Max Coltheart – cognitive scientist and emeritus professor in the Department of Cognitive Science at Macquarie University

== Sports ==
=== All codes/types ===
- David Andersen – basketball #3199, formerly with the US NBA, played with the Australian national basketball team at three Olympic Games (Athens 2004, Beijing 2008, London 2012)
- Ryan Broekhoff – basketballer, #3199, named Player of the Year and an Honorary All-American in 2012 while playing US college basketball with Valparaiso University
- Benjamin Burge – sports shooter, Manchester 2002 and Melbourne 2006 Commonwealth Games and Beijing 2008 Olympic Games medallist
- Ellie Cole – swimmer, Beijing 2008 Paralympics and Delhi 2010 Commonwealth Games medallist
- John Conway – cricketer and journalist, organised the first ever tour of England by the Australian cricket team in 1878
- Taz Douglas – V8 Supercars race driver
- Johnny Famechon – boxer, 1969 World Featherweight Champion and World Boxing Hall of Fame inductee
- Debbie Flintoff-King, OAM – hurdler, Brisbane 1982 Commonwealth Games and Seoul 1988 Olympic Games gold medallist
- Sara Klein – athlete, represented Australia at Commonwealth Games (Glasgow 2014)
- Craig Mottram – athlete, represented Australia at three Olympic Games (Sydney 2000, Athens 2004, Beijing 2008)
- Desmond Piper – hockey player with the Australian national hockey team at three Olympic Games (Tokyo 1964, Mexico 1968, Munich 1972)
- Natalia Rahman – sports shooter, Melbourne 2006 Commonwealth Games gold medallist
- Blake 'Bilko' Williams – motocross rider and freestyle motocross champion
- Brad Williams – cricketer, fast bowler with the Australian national cricket team 2003–present
- Bailey Wright – soccer player with the British Championship Preston North End Football Club and the Australian national soccer team at the 2014 FIFA World Cup

=== Australian rules ===
- Ian Bremner – former Australian rules footballer who represented Collingwood and Hawthorn in the Victorian Football League (VFL) in the 1960s and 1970s
- Dermott Brereton – player with Hawthorn Football Club 1982–1992, Sydney Football Club 1994, and Collingwood Football Club 1995. AFL Hall of Fame inductee and television presenter on Getaway
- Nathan Burke – player with St Kilda Football Club 1987–2003 and captain 1996–2000
- Gary Colling – player with St Kilda Football Club 1968–1981; captain in 1978; teacher at then Baxter Technical School
- Jack Dyer – player known as "Captain Blood" with Richmond Football Club 1931–1949; captain 1941–1949; coach 1941–1952; AFL Hall of Fame inductee (retired to Frankston)
- Leigh Gloury – player with Melbourne Football Club 1953–1954
- Russell Greene – player with St Kilda Football Club 1974–1979 and Hawthorn Football Club 1980–1988, won the Leigh Matthews Trophy in 1984
- Robert Harvey – player with St Kilda Football Club 1988–2008; captain 2001–2002; twice Brownlow Medallist (1997 & 1998)
- Craig Jacotine – player with Collingwood Football Club 1999–2000
- Nathan Lonie – player with Hawthorn Football Club 2001–2005 and Port Adelaide Football Club 2006–2008
- Ryan Lonie – player with Collingwood Football Club 2001–2008
- Leigh Matthews AM – player with Hawthorn Football Club 1969–1985; celebrated coach; AFL Hall of Fame inductee and named the Player of the Century
- Kelvin Moore – player with Hawthorn Football Club 1970–1984; AFL Hall of Fame inductee
- Travis Payze – player with St Kilda Football Club 1966–1974; club president 1986–1993
- Grant Thomas – player with St Kilda Football Club 1978–1983; coach 2001–2006
- Stuart Trott – player with St Kilda Football Club 1967–1974; captain in 1973, played briefly for Hawthorn Football Club 1975–1977
