= CDB =

CDB may refer to:

== Music ==
- CDB (band), an Australian band
- Charlie Daniels Band, the band of American musician Charlie Daniels
- Chris de Burgh, a British-Irish singer-songwriter

== Organizations ==
- Caribbean Development Bank, an international financial institution
- China Development Bank, a Chinese financial institution
- Cyprus Development Bank, a financial institution in Cyprus
- Community development bank, a type of bank in the United States
- Cleveland Daily Banner, a Tennessee newspaper
- Congested Districts Board (disambiguation), in particular
  - Congested Districts Board for Ireland
  - Congested Districts Board (Scotland)

== Science and technology ==
- Constant Data Base, see cdb (software), a database engine
- Command Data Buffer, a data transfer method
- Common Data Bus for the Tomasulo algorithm used for scheduling computer instructions

== Other ==
- CDB!, a children's book by William Steig
- CDB-4124, a biochemical agent
- Cold Bay Airport, an airport that has IATA airport code CDB
- Copa do Brasil, national association football cup competition in Brazil
- Crim Dell bridge at the College of William & Mary
- Draft Communications Data Bill, a draft legislation in the United Kingdom
- Clarks Desert Boot, a chukka boot made by C. & J. Clark
