= John Paul College (Melbourne) =

Coordinates: 38°8′7″S 145°8′21″E

Location
- Mc Mahons Rd, Frankston VIC 3199; Melbourne, Victoria; Australia

Information
- Type: High school
- Motto: With Him Is The Fullness Of Life
- Denomination: Roman Catholic
- Founded: 1979
- Principal: John Visentin
- Years offered: 7–12
- Gender: Co-educational
- Enrolment: 1194
- Colours: Blue and Gold
- Affiliations: Southern Independent Schools
- Website: jpc.vic.edu.au

John Paul College is a Catholic secondary school in Frankston, Victoria, Australia. It was established under the authority of the Archbishop of Melbourne and operated on his behalf by the parish priests of the five member parishes of the region — Frankston, Frankston East, Langwarrin, Chelsea and Seaford, through the College Board.

== History ==
It was formed in 1979 by the merging of two previous colleges, Stella Maris College (girls) and Marianist College (boys). Stella Maris began in 1968 in a large house on the property purchased from the Peninsula Golf Club in 1965 by the Sisters, Faithful Companions of Jesus. The Order took possession of the property in June 1967 and the Sisters took up residence in December of that year. The original two-storey house on the site had been erected and occupied by the Parer family in the second half of the last century, and after changing hands several times, had been in the possession of the Peninsula Golf Club since 1922. Many extensions and alterations had taken place over the years, and further conversions were required to prepare the building for the opening of the school in 1968.

In that first year, four Sisters taught the initial enrolment of ninety-nine girls. Numbers had increased to 169 by the next year and two lay teachers joined the staff. Each succeeding year saw an increase in numbers of students and staff. New classrooms, science rooms and a library were built. From 1968 until 1976, Stella Maris accepted boarders, who were housed in the residential wing of the old clubrooms.

In 1969, a committee was formed to assess the secondary education needs of Frankston. This committee, under the direction of Father Joseph P. Kealy, recommended that a boys college be established. Previously Mary Turner of Seaford had bequeathed some land in Seaford for the establishment of such a boys college. This land was subsequently sold, with the approval of the Trustees of the Turner estate, and the proceeds used to purchase 17 acres (69,000 m^{2}) of the land belonging to Stella Maris College.

The Society of Mary (Marianists) was approached and agreement was reached that members of the Society should establish a boys college for years seven through twelve. Marianist College opened in February 1973 with 166 boys and a staff of six under the direction of Brother Donald Neff SM. Since the school building had not been completed, classes were held in St John's Church (East Frankston) and in the basement of St John's Primary School. During 1974 some classes were accommodated at St Anne's Church and Holy Family Church. Finally, all classes were brought back to the college with the completion of adequate facilities. The college continued to grow rapidly in both numbers of students and buildings to accommodate them.

After preliminary discussions in 1976, it was announced in 1977 that the two colleges would merge. During 1978, detailed planning was carried out for the merger at the beginning of 1979. During 1979, years 7 to 10 girls remained at the Stella Maris section of the college and Olsen Estate. OJ Olsen, a prominent Frankston resident, left an estate to the Church for use in the Frankston area.

In 1997, the college took possession of a set of new and refurbished facilities which have enabled the whole school to operate on one integrated campus, thus bringing to a conclusion the capital development begun in 1968.

In 2012 construction began on the schools new performing arts building and new reception offices. In 2013 the construction of the student services office and the performing art centre was completed. In 2015, the construction of a new visual arts centre began.

== Partner Primary Schools ==
- St Joachim’s Primary School, Carrum Downs
- St Anne's Primary School, Seaford
- St Jude's Primary School, Langwarrin
- St Francis Xavier Primary School, Frankston
- St Joseph's Primary School, Chelsea
- St Augustine's Primary School, Frankston South
- St John's Primary School, Frankston East

== Houses ==
John Paul College has four houses, they are:

- D'houet (Yellow)
- Olsen (Green)
- Chaminade (Blue)
- Turner (Red)

All of the houses are named after people who played significant roles in founding the College or its predecessors. Each of the houses has a House Charity, which they raise funds for, such as Caritas Australia, or the John Paul College Community Companion Van, a trailer that provides food to the homeless of Frankston.

The houses compete in four major competitions: Swimming, Athletics, Cross Country, and house music, as well as smaller competitions including reading and fundraising.

== Sport ==
John Paul College is a member of the Southern Independent Schools (SIS).

=== SIS premierships ===
John Paul College has won the following SIS senior premierships.

Combined:

- Athletics (9) – 1978, 1979, 1980, 1985, 1986, 1987, 1988, 1989, 1992
- Swimming (2) – 1980, 1989

Boys:

- Basketball (6) – 2006, 2007, 2008, 2010, 2014, 2019
- Football (3) – 2000, 2004, 2005
- Soccer (2) – 2006, 2007

Girls:

- Basketball (4) – 1999, 2000, 2014, 2019
- Netball (3) – 1999, 2001, 2017
- Soccer (2) – 2012, 2018

== Notable alumni ==
- David Andersen, NBA Basketballer
- Bailey Dale, AFL Footballer
- Anthony Di Pietro, Melbourne Victory chairman
- Brodie Harper, TV presenter
- Anthony Harvey, AFL Footballer
- Robert Harvey, AFL Footballer
- Paul Johnson, AFL Footballer
- Jack Lonie, AFL Footballer
- Marcus Marigliani, AFL Footballer
- Damien McCormack, AFL Footballer
- Geoff Shaw, conservative politician
- Jeff White, AFL Footballer
