= Padua College =

Padua College may refer to two Roman Catholic schools in Australia:

- Padua College (Brisbane)
- Padua College (Melbourne)
