= Bert Francis =

Australian rules footballer

Personal information
- Full name: Herbert James Francis
- Born: 26 June 1885; South Yarra, Victoria
- Died: 21 July 1958 (aged 73); Hastings, Victoria
- Original team: Hastings
- Position: Ruck

Playing career^{1}
Years	Club	Games (Goals)
1912	Melbourne	5 (1)
- ^{1} Playing statistics correct to the end of 1912.

Herbert James Francis (26 June 1885 – 21 July 1958) was an Australian rules footballer who played for the Melbourne Football Club in the Victorian Football League (VFL).
