= Jack McMillan =

Jack McMillan, may refer to:

- Jack McMillan (Australian footballer) (1912–1969), Australian rules football player
- Jack McMillan (Scottish footballer) (born 1997), Scottish footballer
- Jack McMillan (swimmer)
