= John Barrett (Australian footballer) =

Australian rules footballer (1928–2023)

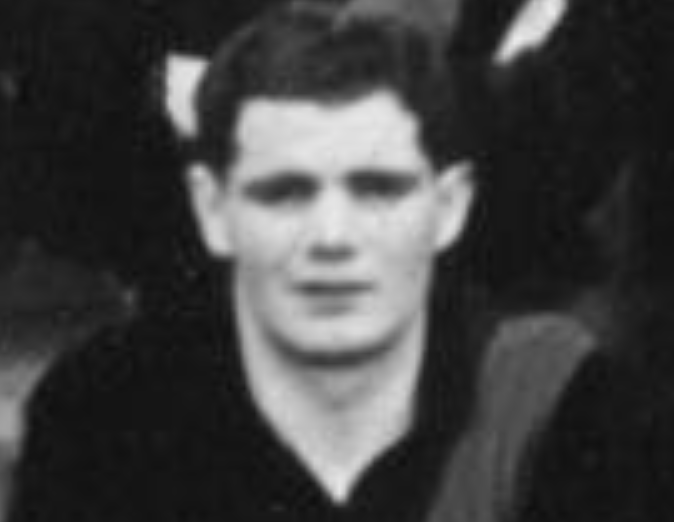

Personal information
- Full name: John Edward Barrett
- Born: 21 December 1928; Frankston, Victoria, Australia
- Died: 11 August 2023 (aged 94); Kingswood, New South Wales, Australia
- Original team: Frankston (MPFL)
- Height: 177 cm (5 ft 10 in)
- Weight: 76 kg (168 lb)

Playing career^{1}
Years	Club	Games (Goals)
1950–53	Footscray	32 (1)
1954–55	Fitzroy	22 (1)
1956	Wangaratta Rovers	
1957	McKinnon	
1958-1961	Hastings	
Total		54 (2)
- ^{1} Playing statistics correct to the end of 1955.

John Edward Barrett (21 December 1928 – 11 August 2023) was an Australian rules football player, who first played for the Frankston Bombers in the Mornington Peninsula Nepean Football League during the second half of the 1940s, then for the Footscray and Fitzroy clubs in the Victorian Football League (VFL) during the first half of the 1950s.

Following this, he played with Wangaratta Rovers (Ovens & Murray Football League, 1956), McKinnon Football Club (Federal Football League, 1957) and Hastings Football Club (Mornington Peninsula Football League, 1958-1961). Starting in 1982, Barrett was a member of the board of Aussie-Rules-Football-Club Sydney Swans, for three years.

In addition, he participated in the Sydney to Hobart Yacht Race three times between 1981 and 1983. Later in 1983 he sailed in a yacht race from Sydney to Nouméa and back.

From 1988 to 1992, he volunteered to organise the Clean Up Australia days.

== Family, early years, and professional career ==
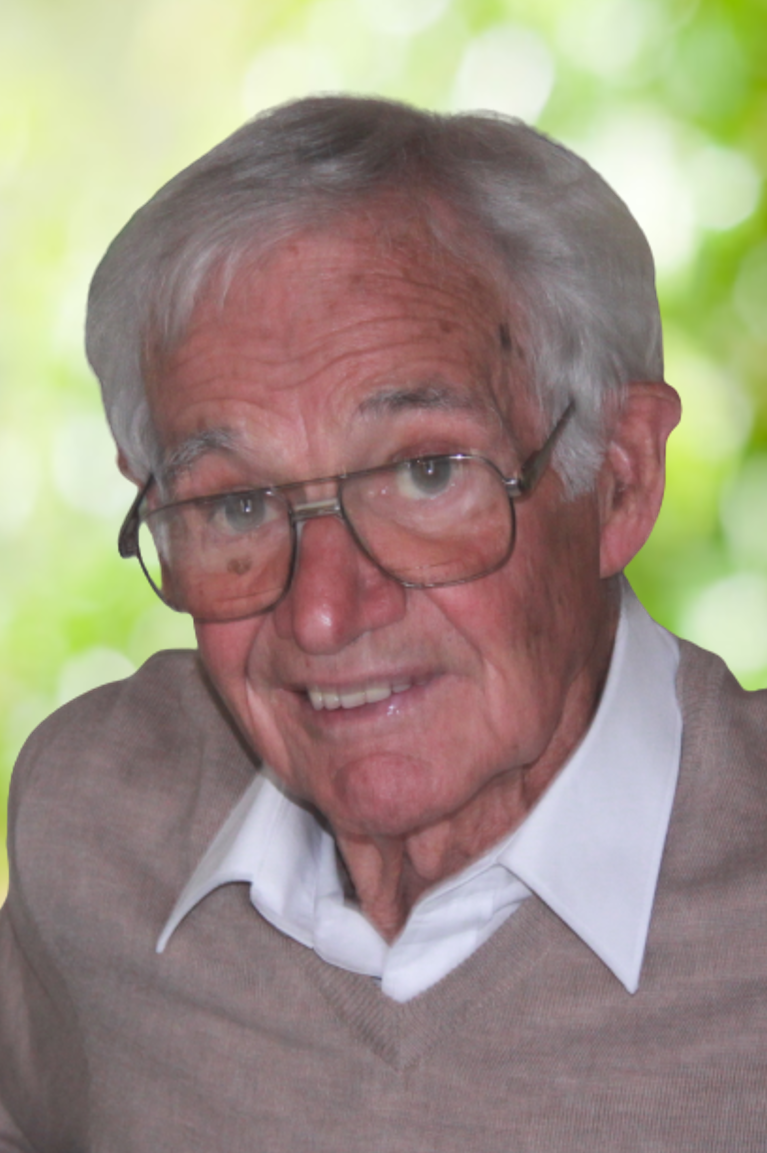
John Edward Barrett, 2012

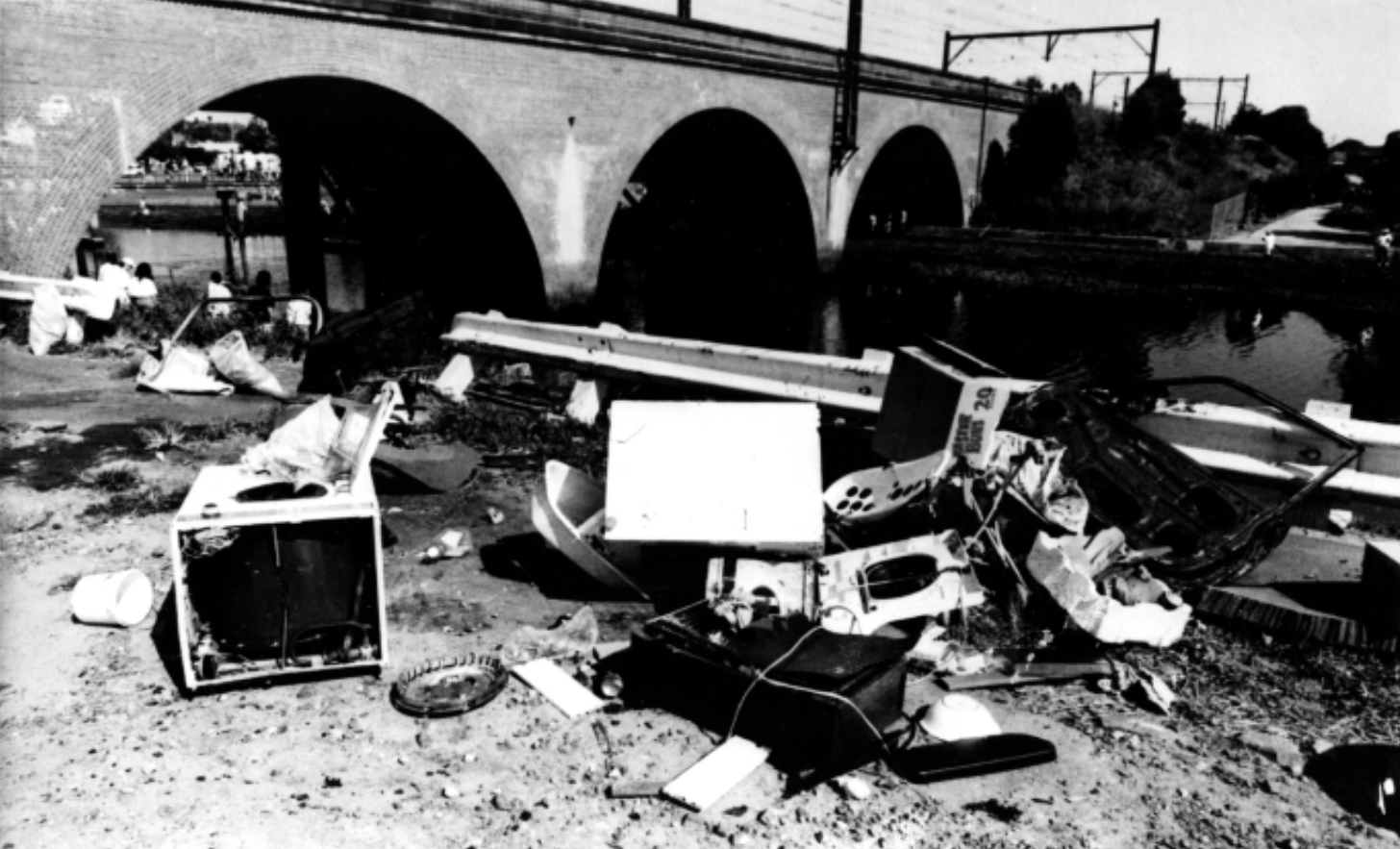
Rubbish hauled from Sydney's Cooks River on Clean Up Australia Day March 3, 1991

John Edward Barrett, son of Edward Barrett (died 1975) and his wife May, née Avage (died 1971), was born at Maxwelton Private Hospital, Frankston, on 21 December 1928. His sister Judith Anne was born in 1931. Barrett was married to his wife Ky, née Schulmann. Two children were born to this union, Ronald Armin (1963–1990) and Karyn (born 1966).

Barrett initially attended Frankston State School from 1935, where he represented his school on official occasions. He transferred to Frankston High School in 1941. In this year he joined the Australian Air League, where he was involved in building model planes and observing flying objects in the airspace due to an impending Japanese invasion of Australia during World War II. In the military-style organization, he achieved the rank of Company Squadron Commander in 1942. In 1944 he passed the examination for the award medal of the Royal Life Saving Society Australia. Barrett represented the school as Senior Prefect and has also been a 'House' Captain as well as Captain of the School Cricket, Football, Swimming and Athletic Teams. He finished high school with an Honor Certificate in 1945.

In 1946, Engineering Cadet Barrett trained as a surveyor and worked for Mordialloc council. From 1951 he held various positions as a salesman, until 1955 with International Harvester Company in South Melbourne, until 1957 with Donovan-Brush Motors in Wangaratta, until 1958 with Wormald Brothers in South Melbourne, and most recently as General Sales Manager for Hardboard Australia, for which he relocated to Sydney with his family in 1976. Barrett retired from the company in 1986, after 25 years of service. During the period from 1988 to 1990, he managed two hotels, one in Waterloo and another in Moore Park, both Sydney neighbourhoods.

From 1988 to 1992, he volunteered to run the Sydney office of Clean Up Australia together with Kim McKay, who had started the initiative with Ian Kiernan. From there he organised the help of 40.000 people, who hauled about 4,000 tonnes of garbage from 140 locations in Sydney Harbour alone on January 21, 1989. For the Clean up day in 1990 in 252 locations, John Barrett enlisted the support of the Royal Australian Navy, the Australian Army, the Water Board, the Maritime Services Board (MSB), the Department of Corrective Services, the State Pollution Control Commission, the National Parks and Wildlife Service and the 24 Sydney councils with foreshore land. The Navy was providing two landing craft and service personnel for the harbour, the MSB supplied rubbish pick-up barges, and the Department of correctives services arranged work teams of people who have been sentenced to community service. 1992 about 25,500 tonnes of waste was collected nation-wide by 400,000 volunteers.

John Edward Barrett died in Kingswood, New South Wales on 11 August 2023, at the age of 94.

== Sports career ==
=== Australian rules football ===
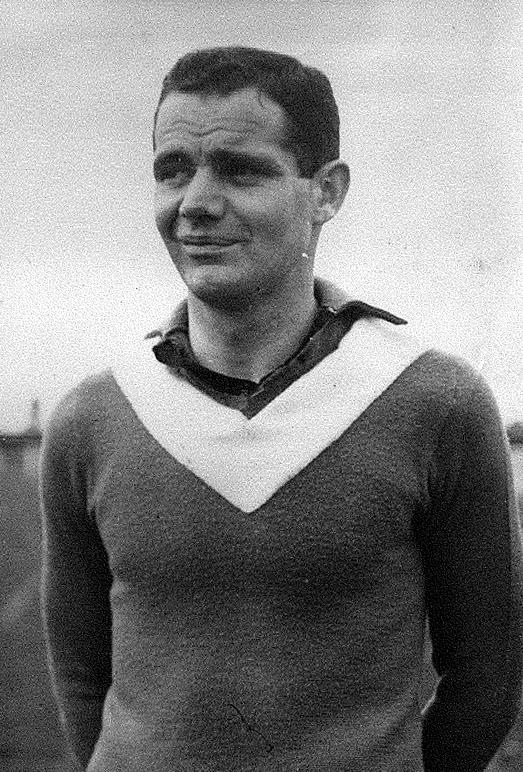
John Edward Barrett, 1954

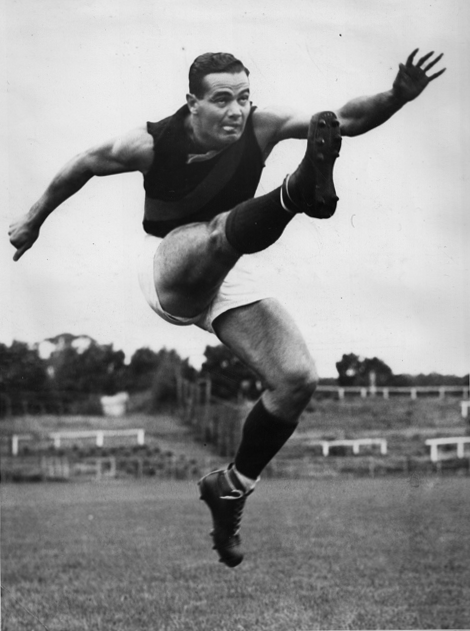
"A mighty punt during training", 1954

Barrett played Australian rules football as early as his high school days. In the 1945 season, the school's senior team, captained by John Barrett, did not lose a single game.

In 1946, Barrett began his professional Australian rules football career with the Frankston Bombers, playing in the Mornington Peninsula Nepean Football League. In 1949, he won the Grand final against the club from Mornington, after they had lost the Grand Final to Hastings Football Club in each of the previous three years.

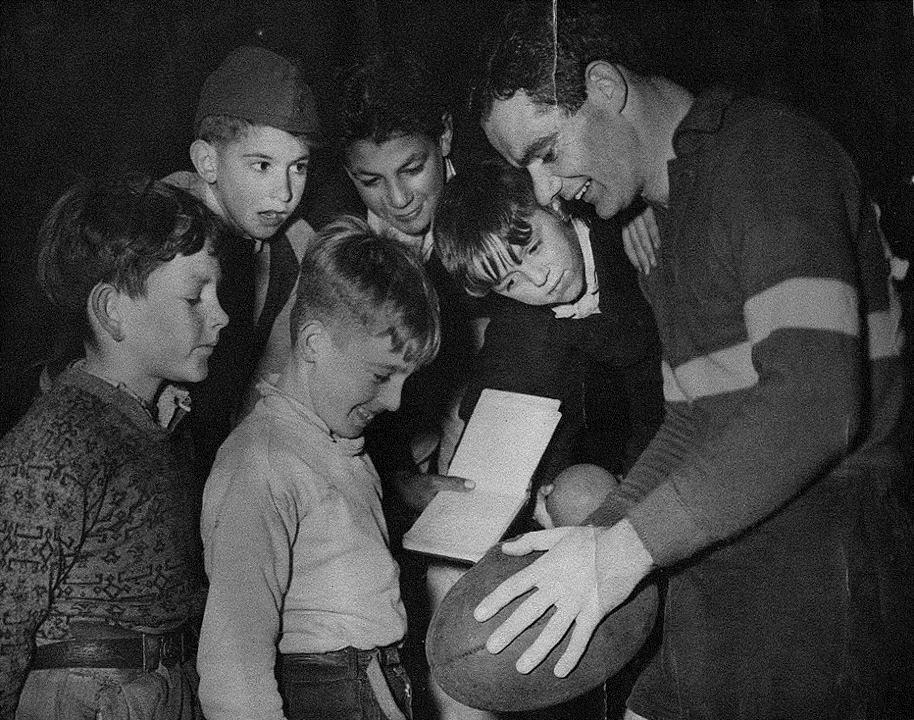
"Hints from an expert", Barrett passing on his experience, 1954

From 1950 to 1953, the 1.77 metre, 76-kilo Australian played for Melbourne's Footscray Football Club (now the Western Bulldogs) in the Victorian Football League (VFL), which later became the Australian Football League (AFL). He scored one goal in 32 games played for the club.

Following this, he played for the Fitzroy Football Club, the Fitzroy Gorillas, also based in Melbourne, between 1954 and 1955 in the AFL in a total of 22 games, scoring twice. He then left the Victorian Football League to play for Wangaratta Rovers Football Club (Ovens & Murray Football League) in 1956, McKinnon Football Club (Federal Football League) in 1957, and Hastings Football Club (Mornington Peninsula Football League) from 1958 to 1961.

In 1982, Barrett was elected to the board of directors of Australian Rules Football club Sydney Swans, where he served for three years.

=== Yacht racing ===
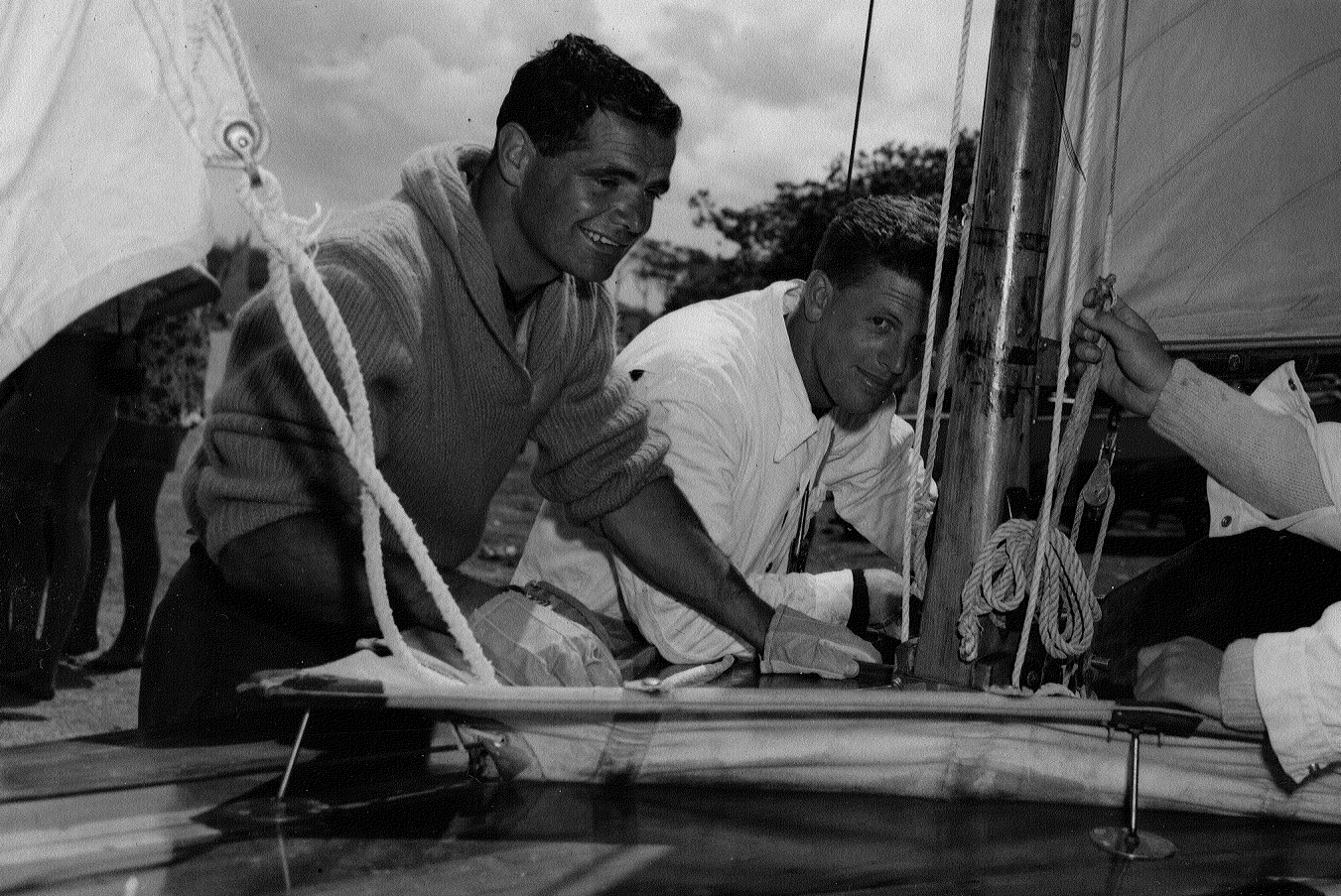
John Barrett and his friend Leigh Gloury working on their yacht Greensleeves, around 1949

John Barrett showed an early interest in sailing and joined the Frankston Yacht Club in 1941, where he became a member of skipper Leigh Gloury's crew of the yacht Greensleeves. In 1976, he joined the Cruising Yacht Club of Australia in Rushcutters Bay, Sydney.

Barrett was part of the crew of Skipper Michael Clements' yacht Rager I, which finished 90th in the annual Sydney to Hobart Yacht Race in 1981, 30th in 1982, and 99th in 1983. In the last two mentioned races he acted as navigator. In 1983 he competed in the race Sydney to Nouméa and back. In August 1989 he sailed from Southport to Mooloolaba on the yacht Rager. In October of that year, he finished his ocean sailing career on the yacht Debutant, sailing from Hamilton Island to Sydney.

=== Other sports activities ===
With great passion, Barrett played golf from 1961 to 2020. From 1985 to 1989, he also enjoyed playing tennis.

== Reception by the media ==
The Melbourne newspaper The Argus judged on 19 June 1950:

"John is a centre-man from Frankston, and is said to be something out of the ordinary. [...] He is only 21, is sturdily built, and has tons of pace."

Cyril Nott highlighted in the Melbourne paper The Sporting Globe on 12 July 1950:

"Sure in the air, clever and elusive on the ground, Barrett should prove one of the cleverest centres, when he gains a little more experience."

The Weekly Times of Melbourne predicted on 5 July 1950:

"Before he went to Footscray, John Barrett, who is 21, was one of Frankston's stars. Football fans on the Peninsula who know him well consider that Barrett has all the courage and ability to become a star defender with the experience he will gain in the league."

The Argus noted on 7 September 1951:

"He did a grand job in a back pocket, and has also shone in the centre. This season he has not been [a] regular, but is a good type who should be useful for a long time."

The Argus noticed on 7 April 1952:

"Barrett pleased officials by his tenacity, pace, and disposal."

The Argus found on 12 May 1954:

"Best of the seconds was John Barrett, former Footscray player, who shone on the wing."

The Sporting Globe praised Barrett on 28 July 1954:

"John Barrett, Fitzroy's new back pocket player, was best man afield in the shock win over Collingwood. Barrett's fearless dashes and clever anticipation broke up numerous Magpie attacking moves."

In an article dated 30 December 1989 about Clean up Sydney 1990, Paul Bailey of The Sydney Morning Herald referred to:

"Mr Clean... collection co-ordinator John Barrett hopes to rid the Harbour shores of their plastic coating."
