= Improved Launch Control System =

The Improved Launch Control System was a system used by the United States Air Force's Minuteman II intercontinental ballistic missile force. The system was a method to transfer targeting information from a Minuteman launch control center to an individual missile by communications lines. Prior to the Improved Launch Control System, new missile guidance had to be loaded at the launch facility; the process usually took hours.

== History ==
The Improved Launch Control System was operational at most Minuteman II wings (except the 44th Missile Wing, which was never upgraded) by the late 1970s. Minuteman III wings had a similar install, designated Command Data Buffer, providing the newer system the potential for remote retargeting.

== Phaseout ==
The system was phased out in mid-1990s by the retirement of the Minuteman II force, and the inactivation or reapportioning of units to Minuteman III. It was replaced by the Rapid Execution and Combat Targeting System.

== Chronology ==
- 1979
  - 1 Mar - 341 SMW's 490th Strategic Missile Squadron completes the Improved Launch Control System upgrades, at a cost of $365 million.

== See also ==
- LGM-30 Minuteman
- Launch control center (ICBM)
- Command Data Buffer - Minuteman III upgrade similar to the Improved Launch Control System
