= St Francis Xavier College, Beaconsfield =

St Francis Xavier College

Location
- Casey & Cardinia Shire, Victoria; Beaconsfield Campus: 38.0529°S 145.3732°E; Berwick Campus: 38.0706°S 145.3384°E; Officer Campus: 38.0608°S 145.4351°E

Information
- Type: Independent co-educational secondary day school
- Religious affiliation: Diocese of Sale Catholic Education Limited (DOSCEL)
- Denomination: Roman Catholic
- Established: 1978
- School number: 03 9707 3111
- Principal: Julie Banda
- Years offered: 7–12
- Gender: Co-educational
- Enrollment: 3000 (2024)
- Average class size: 25
- Houses: Acutis; Bakhita; Bosco; Glowrey; MacKillop; Nagle; Ozanam; Romero
- Colours: Navy blue; Red; White; Gold
- Affiliation: Southern Independent Schools
- Website: www.sfx.vic.edu.au

St Francis Xavier College is a 7–12 Catholic co-educational school in Victoria, Australia. In 2024, it had over 3,000 students and 333 staff, with over 1,500 students and teachers in the Beaconsfield campus alone. It has campuses in Berwick, Beaconsfield and Officer.

== Campuses ==
St Francis Xavier College has three campuses:

- Beaconsfield: Opened in 1978, the campus houses students years 10–12
- Berwick: The Berwick campus was opened in 2003. It serves students years 7–9
- Officer: Having opened in 2012, the newest campus accommodates students years 7–9

Closed/converted campuses:

- Cranbourne: Opened in 1987, converted to St Peter's College seven years later

== History ==
The Beaconsfield campus was opened on 7 February 1978, with an initial intake of 72 students, with the first principal being Robert Schneider. Due to the increase demand for the Beaconsfield campus, the Cranbourne campus opened in 1987. However, seven years later the campus was converted into St. Peter's College. The Berwick campus, opened in 2003, is a dedicated junior campus, serving students year 7 to 9, with the intention to serve the community of Berwick, and neighbouring communities like Narre Warren and Cranbourne. The most recent campus to open is the Officer campus, which opened in 2012. Much like the Berwick campus it is for students between years 7–9. The Officer campus is meant to serve as the campus for students residing in Pakenham, Clyde, and outreaching suburbs of the Gippsland region.

The College Legends programme at St Francis Xavier College recognises individuals who have made significant contributions to the college's establishment, educational development, facilities, pastoral care and community life. The programme was formerly known as Living Treasures.

Name	Contributions to the college
Des McKenna	Played a major role in the planning, establishment, financing and early development of the college.
Carmel McKenna	Supported the establishment and development of the college alongside her husband, Des McKenna, and contributed to its community life.
Robert Schneider	Founding principal from 1978 to 1982; established the college's initial educational direction and worked on the design of its crest.
Des O'Connell	Designed the college crest and helped establish its visual identity.
Msgr John Gallagher	Supported the college's establishment, served on its Board of Management and contributed to its Catholic and liturgical life.
Terry Synan	As Director of Catholic Education in the Diocese of Sale, contributed to the planning, establishment and financing of the college.
Jack Thomas	Provided financial management and oversight during the college's formative years.
Gael White	Served on the Interim Board of Management and the college board; advocated for the construction of the original Beaconsfield library.
Maureen McDonagh	Served as board secretary and chairperson and contributed to the establishment of the Cranbourne campus.
Trevor Wilson	Business manager from 1983 to 2000; supported financial management, computerisation and campus infrastructure development.
Sr Mary McCarthy	Helped develop the college curriculum, including music and sport, and later took on student pastoral care responsibilities.
Sr Rosaleen McCaffrey	Served in several administrative and pastoral roles and contributed to the college's chapel, liturgy and sacramental life.
Sr Mary Jenkins	Led middle and senior school programs, served as deputy principal and contributed to pastoral care and student formation.
Aidan Burns	Principal from 1990 to 2000; oversaw substantial facility development and introduced the House system.
Bob Burgess	Teacher from 1991 to 1993 who contributed to student life and the wider local community.
Vicki Clark	Taught Art and Studio Arts and contributed to music and drama productions, camps, retreats and student wellbeing programs.
Len Cooke	Developed the senior school information technology curriculum, supported pastoral care and contributed to youth ministry and retreats.
Paul Desmond	Principal from 2005 to 2014; oversaw college growth and the development and opening of the Officer campus.
Bernadette Barlow	Mathematics teacher from 1998 to 2017 who supported Tournament of Minds, student enrichment, social justice initiatives and college governance.

== Curriculum ==
St Francis Xavier College curriculum for students in Year 7 to 10 based on the Victorian Curriculum F-10. St Francis Xavier College offers its senior students the Victorian Certificate of Education (VCE), the VCE VCE Vocational Major (VCE VM), and Vocational Education and Training (VET) programs. All curriculum the college uses is in alignment with the Victorian Curriculum and Assessment Authority (VCAA)

As a Catholic school all students (Year 7 to 12) are required to complete Religion Education, this is offered in obtainment of a timetabled class in which students must reach a Satisfaction. In alignment with the Diocese of Sale Catholic Education Office Ltd. (DOSCEL), the College uses the Diocesan curriculum 'To Live in Christ Jesus'. This curriculum aims to teach from the Catholic perspective through the invitation of other faiths along the journey. The 'To live in Christ Jesus' framework is based on four core learning strands; Triune God, The Life and Mission of Jesus, Sacramental Church and Christian Life and Catholic Social Teaching.

St Francis Xavier College VCE Result 2012-2024
Year	Rank	Median study score	Scores of 40+ (%)	Cohort size
2012	202	30	4.6	354
2013	261	29	3.7	412
2014	206	30	4.7	386
2015	154	31	5.8	415
2016	186	30	5.9	435
2017	253	29	4.3	513
2018	188	30	5.3	541
2019	220	29	6.1	505
2020	229	29	5.9	598
2021	259	29	4.3	615
2022	265	29	3.9	564
2023	308	28	2.8	582
2024	359	27	3.6	600
2025	380	27	2.5	565

== Extra-curricular activities ==
The school participates in the annual athletics carnival, swimming carnival and cross country, where students from different houses compete. St Francis Xavier College is also a member of the Southern Independent Schools (SIS). The college participates in SIS chess, debating, music, public speaking and sport.

=== SIS premierships ===
St. Francis Xavier College has won the following SIS senior premierships.

Combined:

- Athletics (7) – 2005, 2006, 2007, 2008, 2009, 2010, 2013

Boys:

- Basketball (3) – 2003, 2009, 2019
- Cricket (7) – 1999, 2001, 2002, 2004, 2010, 2015, 2016
- Football (12) – 1999, 2006, 2007, 2008, 2009, 2012, 2013, 2014, 2015, 2016, 2019
- Soccer (6) – 2008, 2011, 2014, 2015, 2019, 2020, 2024

Girls:

- Basketball (8) – 2001, 2004, 2008, 2009, 2013, 2016, 2017, 2018
- Football (5) – 2011, 2012, 2015, 2016, 2018
- Netball (11) – 2000, 2006, 2007, 2008, 2009, 2010, 2011, 2012, 2013, 2016, 2019
- Soccer (3) – 2015, 2016, 2020

== College crest ==
The college crest can be broken down into three different sections:

"The Eagle": The eagle is used as a symbol of a messenger/spreader of good news.

"The Fish": The Ichthys is a secret symbol that was used by early Christians to avoid arising suspicion and being persecuted.

"The Stars": The Southern Cross.

== NAPLAN ==
Year sevens in 2020 were unable to complete NAPLAN because of COVID-19. However, the same cohort participated in year nine NAPLAN in 2022.

Median NAPLAN results for Grade 9
Year	Year 9 Grammar & Punctuation	Year 9 Numeracy	Year 9 Reading	Year 9 Spelling	Year 9 Writing
2022	564.5	565.5	567.0	579.5	560.2
2024	546	558	561	564	585
2025	545	554	566	566	590

== Attendance ==
The college has listed the specific attendance percentage per grade per campus, here.

Semester 1 & 2 Attendance Rate
Year	Semester 1	Semester 2
2022	87.40%	82.93%
2024	86.1%	
2025	86.15%	

== Camps, retreats and experiences ==
=== Year 7 camp ===
Year 7 camp takes part during Term 3. This camp is in order for students to get to know each other, especially those of their house and of their care group. The three-day experience is filled with activities.

=== Year 8 city experience ===
Year 8 students get to experience a three-day program in which they explore Melbourne city, to learn about the "landscape, public transport and culture". Students work together in teams so that they can collect data, which is later used in a group-based inquiry project.

== Learning adjustments ==
Hands On Learning is an educational program, founded in 1999, that adjusts student's education to support social and emotional development. The college is one of one hundred and twenty schools which offer the program. The program is run only at the junior campuses (Berwick and Officer). The program aims to engage in a practical learning style instead of an academic one. The college states that the program is to help students that are not supported with traditional learning programs, because those students could otherwise "disengage from school, demonstrate challenging behaviours and report low levels of belonging". The college states that 95% of students who participate in the program get an apprenticeship or job. Furthermore, the college states that beyond learning the program is based on four principles: a place to belong, people to belong to, real things to do, and a chance to give back.

== Principals ==
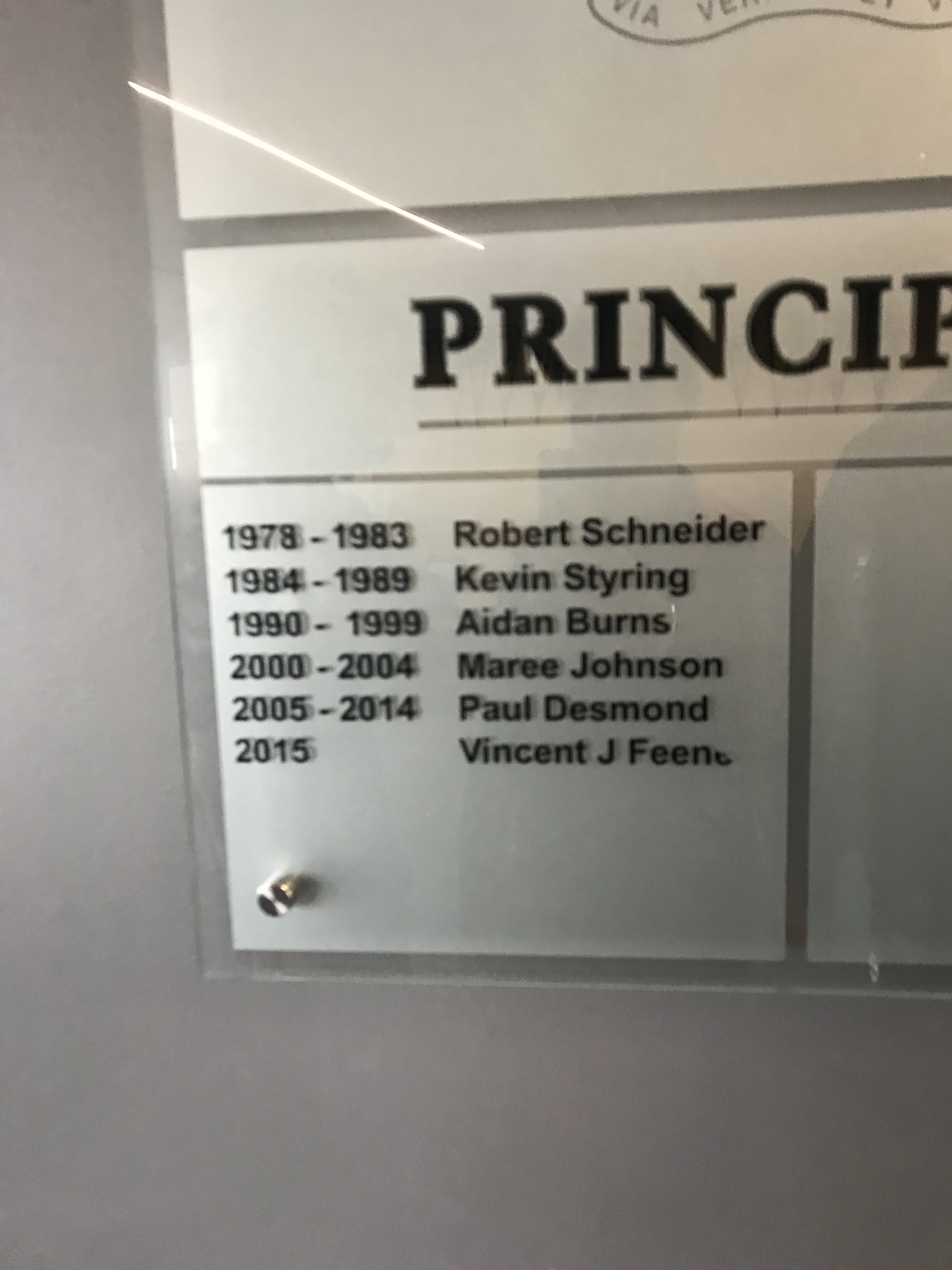
Principals plaque at St Francis Xavier College Beaconsfield (2023)

Previous and current principals of the school can be seen as according to the image of the plaque on the right. The current principal, since 2026, is Julie Banda. Maree Johnson had an auditorium named after her.

History of principals at SFX
Epoch	Principal
1978–1983	Robert Schenider
1984–1989	Kevin Styring
1990–1999	Aidan Burns
2000–2004	Maree Johnson
2005–2014	Paul Desmond
2015–2025	Vincent J Feeney
2026 & Onwards	Julie Banda

== Notable alumni ==
- Steven Salopek, former AFL footballer for Port Adelaide
- Jake Aarts, AFL footballer for Richmond
- Tyanna Smith, AFLW footballer for St Kilda
- Georgia Gee, AFLW footballer for Essendon
- Moira Deeming, member of the Victorian Legislative Council
- Destanee Aiava, professional tennis player
- Tyla Hanks, 2021 AFLW rising star for Melbourne
