= Woodleigh School, Melbourne =

Woodleigh School

Location
- Minimbah Court, Frankston South (junior); Golf Links Road, Langwarrin South (senior); Melbourne, Victoria; Australia

Information
- Type: Independent, co-educational, day
- Motto: Adventurous Minds
- Denomination: Non-denominational
- Established: 1856
- Chairman: Gerry Gogan
- Headmaster: David Baker
- Years offered: ELC–12
- Gender: Co-educational
- Enrolment: 934
- Colours: Pine green and white
- Affiliation: Southern Independent Schools
- Website: www.woodleigh.vic.edu.au

Woodleigh School is an independent, co-educational, K-12 day school located in the Melbourne suburb of Langwarrin South, Victoria, Australia. It has two junior campuses; "Minimbah" (38°10′25″S 145°06′49″E), located in Frankston South, and "Penbank" located in Moorooduc. Its senior campus, "Woodleigh" (38°11′31″S 145°10′30″E), is located in Langwarrin South.

== History ==
Woodleigh School was founded in 1856 as St Paul's School, and operated out of a hall on the grounds of St. Paul's Anglican Church in Frankston. It was the first school in Frankston, as well as one of the earliest in the then colony of Victoria, and is the oldest co-educational school in the state of Victoria.

In 1970, the school moved to a 3.5 ha property off Seaview Road in Frankston South (now Minimbah Court) which it named "Minimbah" – the Bunurong aboriginal word for "place of learning". In 1975, it purchased the former 12.5 ha farm "Woodleigh" on Golf Links Road in Langwarrin South. During this time, the Minimbah site became the junior campus and the Woodleigh site became the senior campus of the school.

After acquiring further land at its Woodleigh site, creating a 22 ha campus, the school changed its name to Woodleigh School in 1999.

== Sport ==
Woodleigh is a member of the Southern Independent Schools (SIS).

=== SIS premierships ===
Woodleigh has won the following SIS senior premierships.

Boys:

- Basketball (2) – 2001, 2013
- Cricket (3) – 2004, 2006, 2007
- Football (2) – 2008, 2016

Girls:

- Basketball – 2017
- Football (4) – 2006, 2007, 2008, 2015
- Netball (2) – 2004, 2008
