= Jake Aarts =

Australian rules footballer (born 1994)

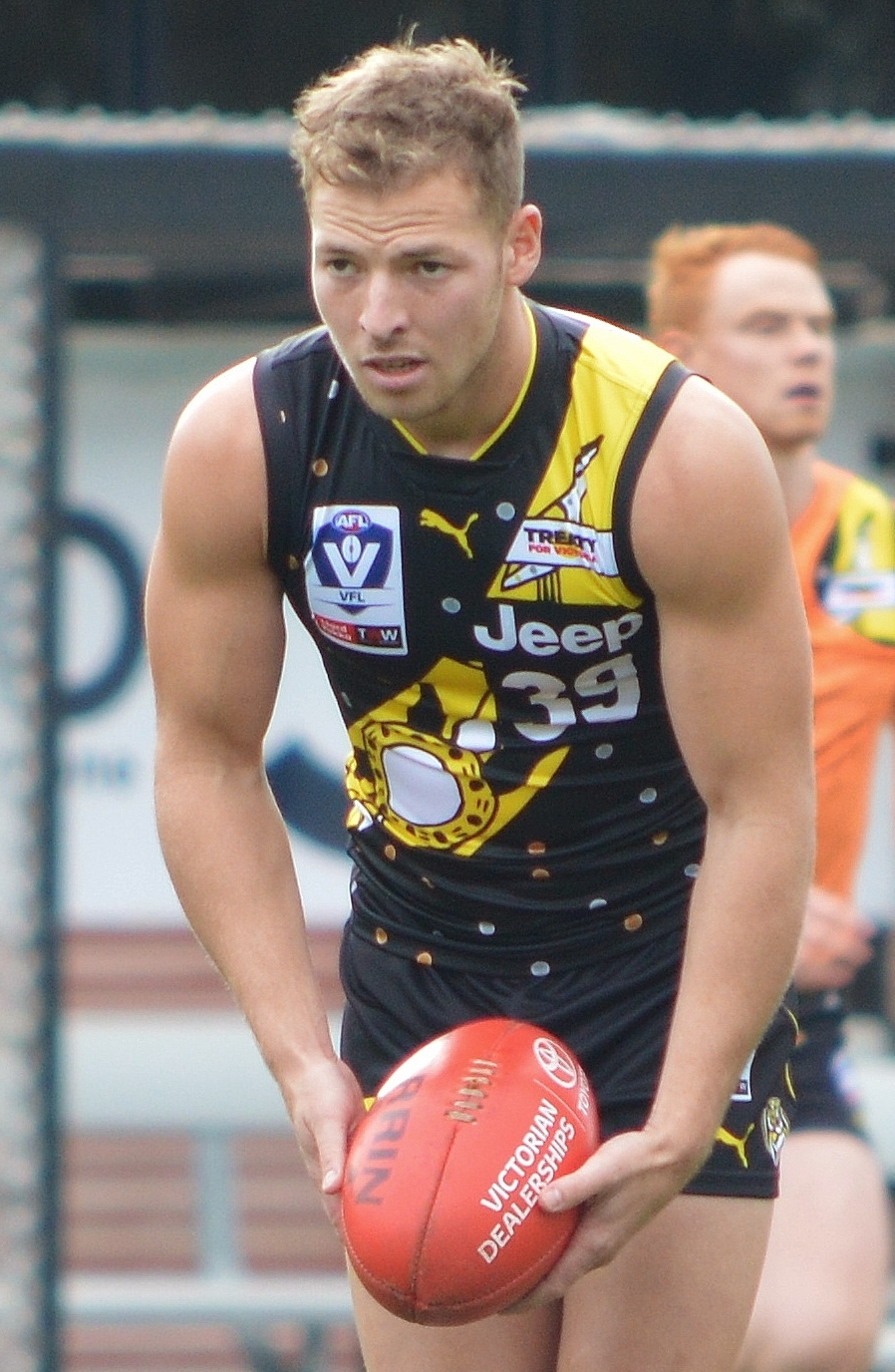
- Aarts with Richmond's VFL side in May 2019

Personal information
- Born: 8 December 1994 (age 31)
- Original team: Richmond (VFL)
- Draft: No. 16, 2019 rookie draft
- Debut: Round 5, 2020, Richmond vs. Melbourne, at MCG
- Height: 177 cm (5 ft 10 in)
- Weight: 75 kg (165 lb)
- Position: Small forward

Playing career^{1}
Years	Club	Games (Goals)
2019–2022	Richmond	42 (34)
- ^{1} Playing statistics correct to the end of 2022 season.

Jake Aarts (born 8 December 1994) is a professional Australian rules footballer who played for the Richmond Football Club in the Australian Football League (AFL). He played state-league football with Richmond's VFL side before being drafted to the club's AFL list at the 2019 rookie draft in November 2018. Aarts made his AFL debut in round 5 of the 2020 season.

== Early life and state-league football ==
Aarts played junior and senior local football at the Beaconsfield Football Club in his teenage years but was overlooked by junior representative TAC Cup clubs. In 2013, he followed former Beaconsfield coach Austinn Jones to the Bendigo Football Club when Jones became the club's VFL head coach. He remained with Bendigo for 32 games over two years playing as a wing and half-forward, but when the club folded at the end the 2014 season, Aarts joined the 2015 VFL-only playing squad for the AFL club Richmond's reserves team. There he played alongside the club's non-selected AFL-listed players for three years before being selected to serve in the team's leadership group for the 2018 season. Aarts finished 2018 having played 16 matches and holding averages of 13 disposals, four tackles and one goal a game, and earned an invitation to the Victorian state draft combine. By the end of the 2018 season, Aarts had played 49 matches with Richmond's reserves and a total of 81 state-league games.

He attended secondary school at St. Francis Xavier College, Beaconsfield

== AFL career ==
=== 2019 season ===
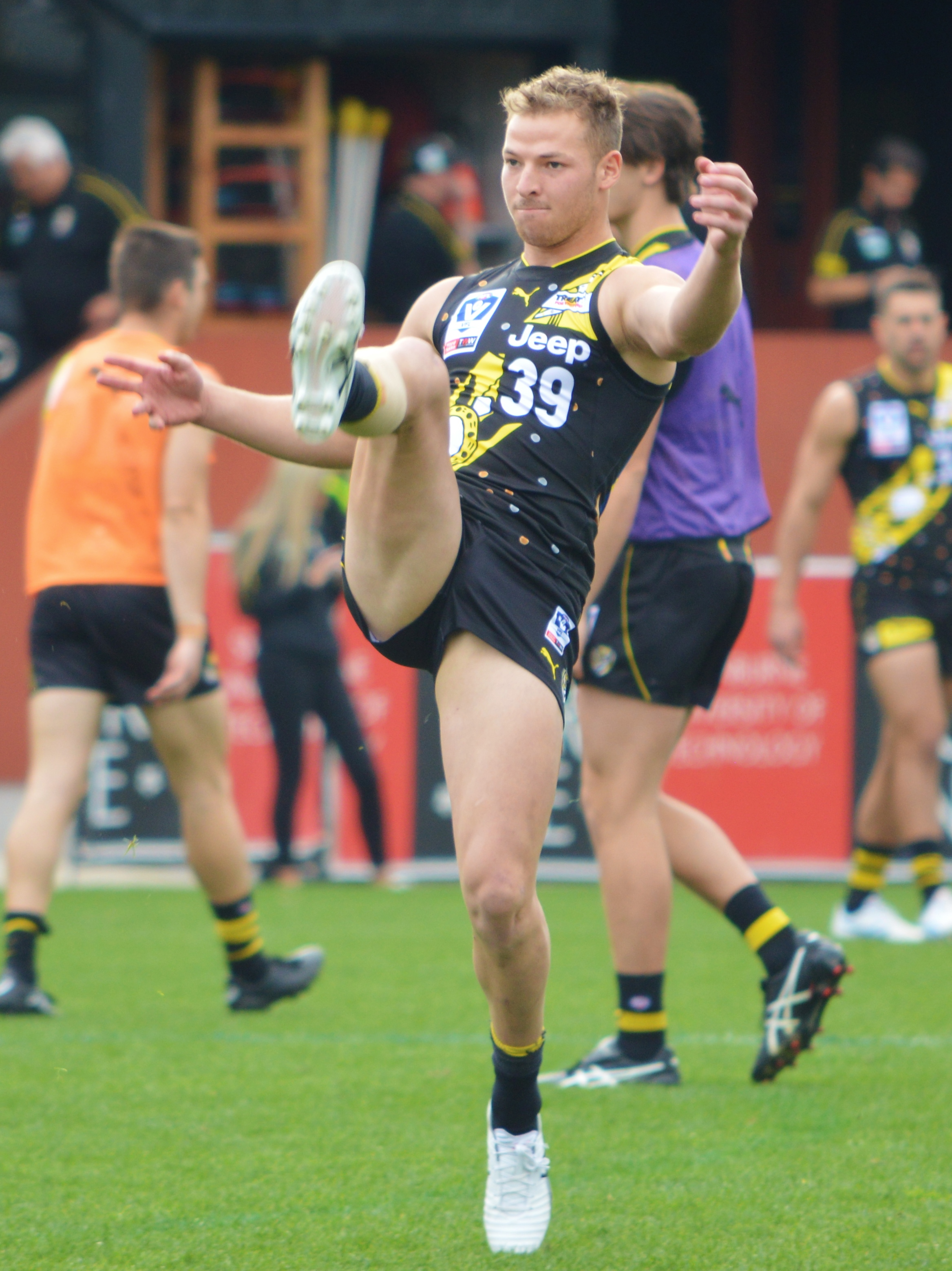
Aarts kicks for goal while with Richmond's VFL side in May 2019

Aarts was drafted by Richmond with the club's first pick and the 16th selection overall in the 2019 rookie draft.

He began his first AFL-listed season by playing reserves grade practice matches with the VFL team in March 2020, including with a three-goal haul in the last of those outings. Aarts missed the opening round of the VFL season with injury but by the end of April was labelled "ready for an AFL opportunity" by reserves coach Craig McRae. In mid-May, Aarts was named a round 8 non-playing AFL emergency following a strong three-goal performance in the VFL a week earlier. He was rested for one VFL match later that month while dealing with general soreness and missed a further match in July with a minor calf injury. He turned in an excellent VFL performance in early August, notching 24 disposals and three goals in a showing that saw him named as an AFL emergency in round 22. While he was again an emergency in round 23, Aarts could not make an AFL debut before the beginning of the VFL finals series, where he contributed one goal in a qualifying final win over the Essendon reserves. In the preliminary final a fortnight later, Aarts was reported for rough conduct against Port Melbourne's Tom O'Sullivan and received a four-week suspension. Due to that suspension, Aarts was one of just six players on the Richmond list to play in neither the AFL nor VFL premiership winning sides in 2019. Aarts finished the 2019 season without having made an AFL debut, but having played 16 matches and kicking 18 goals with Richmond's reserves side in the VFL.

=== 2020 season ===
In the early months of the 2019/20 pre-season, Aarts suffered from groin and hip soreness and had limited participation in training, before returning to full fitness by the first week of February 2020. He was selected to play in the opening match of the pre-season series in early-March, his first top-level game since being drafted to the club. Aarts was dropped back to reserves level after recording 10 disposals, instead playing in one VFL practice match the following week before the remainder of pre-season practice matches were cancelled due to safety concerns as a result of the rapid progression of the COVID-19 pandemic into Australia. After just one round of AFL matches and as a result of the still unfolding pandemic, the AFL season was suspended for a period of 11 weeks. In place of the cancelled VFL season, Aarts' return to match-play came through organised reserves practice matches against opposition team's unselected players. He performed consistently well in three such matches when the season resumed in June, earning an AFL debut in round 5's win over Melbourne at the MCG. Aarts made a solid debut with 15 disposals and three score involvements in the shortened game, played with quarter lengths reduced by one fifth like all matches in that pandemic-affected 17-round season. In the week that followed, Aarts moved with the main playing group when the club was relocated to the Gold Coast in response to a virus outbreak in Melbourne. He kicked his first two career goals in his third match, a round 7 win over North Melbourne. After that breakthrough, Aarts became a regular goalkicker, contributing eight goals over the next four matches including a career-high three goals in round 9's win over the Western Bulldogs. He remained in the senior side for the rest of the regular season, including as the game's equal-leading goalscorer in a round 18 win over Adelaide despite a minor shoulder injury sustained during the match. Aarts held his place into the first week of the finals, contributing eight disposals and three tackles in a qualifying final loss to the Brisbane Lions. It was to be his last AFL match of the season however, with omitted from the semi-final side but named instead as a non-playing emergency across each of the club's final three matches including for the grand final victory over Geelong. For his debut season in which he featured in 14 of a possible 21 matches, Aarts earned equal-14th place in the club's best and fairest count.

=== 2021 season ===
Ahead of the 2021 season, Aarts switched guernsey numbers, adopting the number 16 last worn by Shaun Hampson in 2017.

== Player profile ==
Aarts plays as a small forward and half-forward, adept at tackling and applying defensive pressure on rebounding opposition defenders while also being relatively strong at ball-winning in contest situations compared to most small forwards. In his junior years, his time with Bendigo and his early seasons with Richmond's VFL side, Aarts played as an inside midfielder, before making a move to the forward line under the direction of Richmond VFL coach Craig McRae.

== AFL statistics ==
Updated to the end of round 23, 2022.

Legend
G	Goals	K	Kicks	D	Disposals	T	Tackles
B	Behinds	H	Handballs	M	Marks

Season	Team	No.	Games	Totals							Averages (per game)							Votes
Season	Team	No.	Games	G	B	K	H	D	M	T	G	B	K	H	D	M	T	Votes
2019	Richmond	39	0	—	—	—	—	—	—	—	—	—	—	—	—	—	—	—
2020 (Note: The 2020 season was played with 17 home-and-away matches per team (down from 22) and 16-minute quarters with time on (down from 20-minute quarters with time on) due to the impact of the COVID-19 pandemic.)	Richmond	39	14	14	5	71	64	135	31	33	1.0	0.4	5.1	4.6	9.6	2.2	2.4	1
2021	Richmond	16	21	18	12	122	100	222	53	53	0.9	0.6	5.8	4.8	10.6	2.5	2.5	0
2022	Richmond	16	7	2	2	20	29	49	6	14	0.3	0.3	2.9	4.1	7.0	0.9	2.0	0
Career			42	34	19	213	193	406	90	100	0.8	0.5	5.1	4.6	9.7	2.1	2.4	1

== Personal life ==
Prior to his professional career, Aarts worked as a qualified carpenter.

Aarts and partner Amelia had a baby daughter in January 2021.
