= St John's Regional College =

Location
- Melbourne, Victoria; Australia; 37°59′26″S 145°13′34″E

Information
- Type: Catholic secondary college, co-educational
- Motto: Virtus in Astra Tendit
- Denomination: Roman Catholic
- Established: 1958
- Founder: De La Salle Brothers and Presentation Sisters
- Principal: Tim Hogan
- Grades: 7–12
- Gender: Co-educational
- Enrolment: 0approx.
- Campus: Dandenong
- Colours: Yellow, blue, green
- Affiliation: Southern Independent Schools
- Website: sjrc.vic.edu.au

St John's Regional College is a Catholic co-educational secondary school located in Dandenong region in the south-eastern suburbs of Melbourne, Victoria, Australia.

== House system ==
In 2008, St John's established a vertical House System which operates from Year 7 to Year 12.

- Each House consists of six Homeroom Groups, which consist of approximately 3 students from each of the 7–12 year levels.
- Each House has a coordinator who is responsible for the overall development of each individual's sense of belonging, loyalty and spirit in his/her House, as well as for administrative tasks.
- Each Homeroom Group is immediately cared for by the Homeroom teacher. As much as possible, the same Homeroom teacher will remain with the students throughout their enrolment at the College.
- Family members are placed in the same House but not usually in the same Homeroom Group.
- The Homeroom Groups meet for 10 minutes each morning.
- On different occasions, greater amounts of time are spent on House functions and House assemblies to allow students to gather together to acknowledge student achievement and foster House spirit.

== College principals ==
- Amedy Molloy 1958–1969
- Domenic Della Bosca 1970–1975
- Leo Scollen 1976–1982
- Kevin Maloney 1983–1987
- Michael Quin 1988–1991
- Patrick Power 1992–2008
- Andrew Walsh 2009–2016
- Brendan Watson 2016 – end of 2016 (interim Principal)
- Tim Hogan 2017–

== Sport ==
St John's is a member of the Southern Independent Schools (SIS).

=== SIS premierships ===
St John's has won the following SIS senior premierships.

Combined:

- Athletics (12) – 1981, 1982, 1983, 1984, 1990, 1991, 1993, 1997, 1998, 2002, 2003, 2004
- Swimming (7) – 1981, 1982, 1983, 1984, 1985, 1986, 1987

Boys:

- Basketball (7) – 1999, 2001, 2005, 2006, 2007, 2014, 2017
- Cricket (4) – 2000, 2001, 2005, 2008
- Football (4) – 2004, 2005, 2006, 2007
- Soccer (4) – 2012, 2013, 2017, 2018

Girls:

- Basketball – 2002
- Netball (5) – 1999, 2001, 2005, 2006, 2007
- Soccer – 2017

== Notable alumni ==
- Andrew Bogut – basketball player (Golden State Warriors)
- Digby Ioane – rugby union player (Australia national rugby union team, Queensland Reds)
- Jay Kennedy-Harris – AFL Footballer
- Geraldine Quinn – comedian
- Adam Ramanauskas – Australian rules footballer (Essendon Football Club)
