= Rapid Execution and Combat Targeting System =

The United States Air Force's Rapid Execution and Combat Targeting System (REACT) is a modification of the LGM-30 Minuteman launch control centers (LCC's) that provides continual monitoring and rapid retargeting of Minuteman ICBMs. It integrates communication systems and weapon systems into a single console.

There is now 1 launch key and three cooperative switches that must be turned simultaneously by the two missile combat crew members to initiate a launch vote. Prior to REACT, there were two keys.

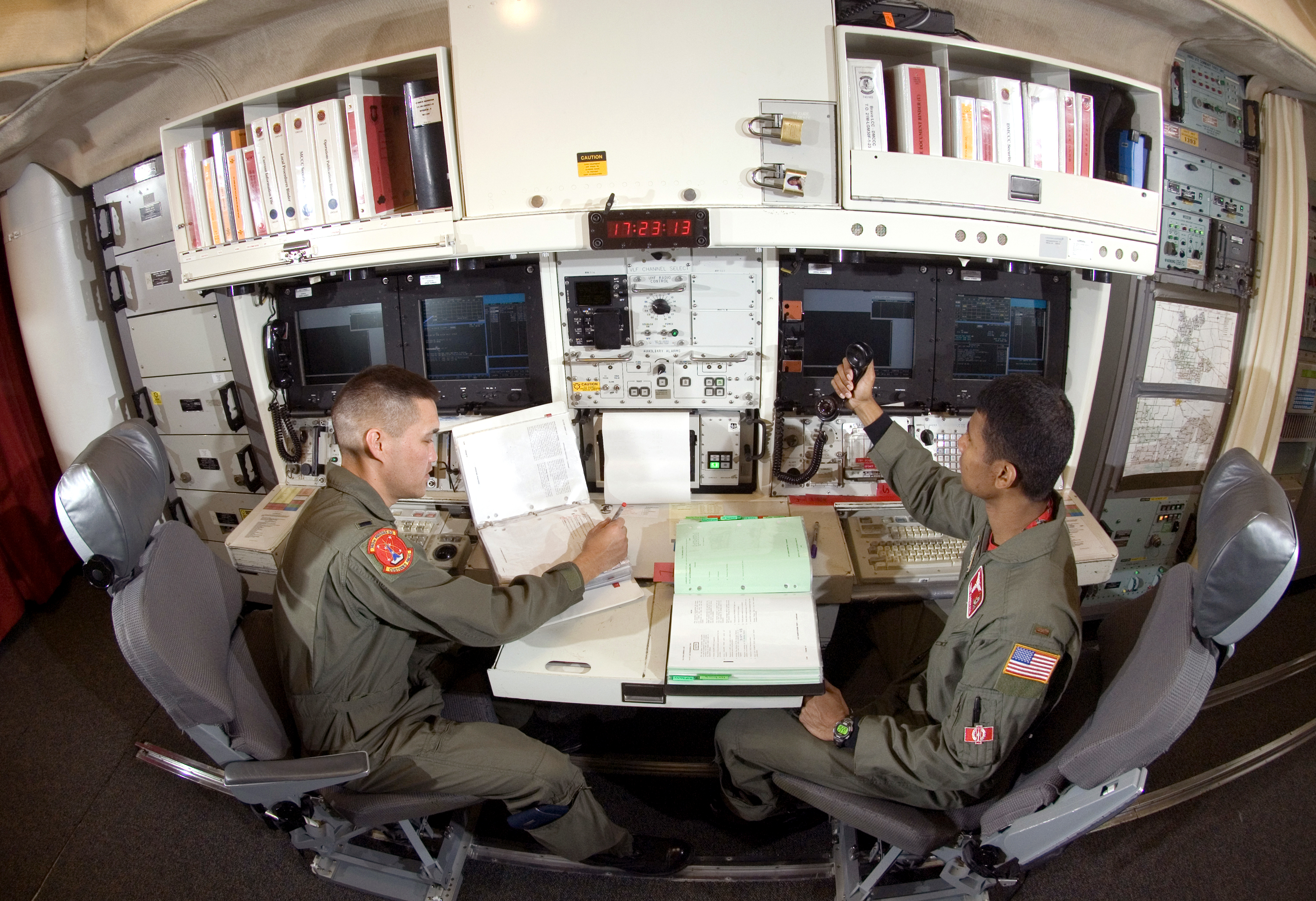
Minuteman crew at REACT console

== History ==
The previous Minuteman III command and control system, designated Command Data Buffer or CDB, required over 20 hours to retarget the entire Minuteman force and 30 minutes to retarget a single ICBM. REACT system needs less than 10 hours to retarget all missiles, while individual missiles can be retargeted in matter of minutes.

REACT was previously known as the ICBM integrated Electronics Upgrade (I2EU)

REACT incorporates a secure communication link between LCC and Higher Authority (SACCS) to receive configuration and targeting data without any need for manual data input.

Automatic processing and decoding of Emergency War Orders is another feature which reduces missile crews' workload.

The REACT upgrades began around 1994. All Minuteman LCC's were upgraded.

== See also ==
- Command Data Buffer (CDB)
- Improved Launch Control System (ILCS)
- Missile combat crew
