= Bayside Christian College =

Coordinates: 38°10′41.4″S 145°09′45″E

- Langwarrin South, Victoria; Australia

Information
- Type: Independent, co-educational (primary), (secondary), day school
- Motto: Unity and Maturity in Christ
- Denomination: Non-denominational Christian
- Established: 1982
- Principal: Stephan Munyard
- Years: ELC–12
- Gender: Co-educational
- Enrolment: 550
- Colours: Dark blue and light blue
- Website: www.baysidecc.vic.edu.au

Bayside Christian College is an independent, co-educational (primary), (secondary), day school located in Langwarrin South, Victoria (Australia).

== About the school ==
Bayside Christian College is located on the Mornington Peninsula in Melbourne's south east. Located between Port Phillip and Westernport Bays, it provides comprehensive Christian Education for all abilities and age levels. The college belongs to a group of schools throughout Australia known as Christian Education National created to partner with parents in providing an education that embraces Christian values and is based on a Christian worldview.

== History ==
Bayside Christian College began life as Frankston Christian School in temporary buildings on Beach Street, Frankston. At the beginning of 1982, a small group of thirty-eight primary students and two teachers gathered in the playground, about the size of a suburban back yard to witness the opening of a parent-controlled Christian school to service the Christian community of Frankston and the Mornington Peninsula. In 2012 it celebrated its 30th birthday.
