= Olivers Hill, Victoria =

Olivers Hill
- Suburb
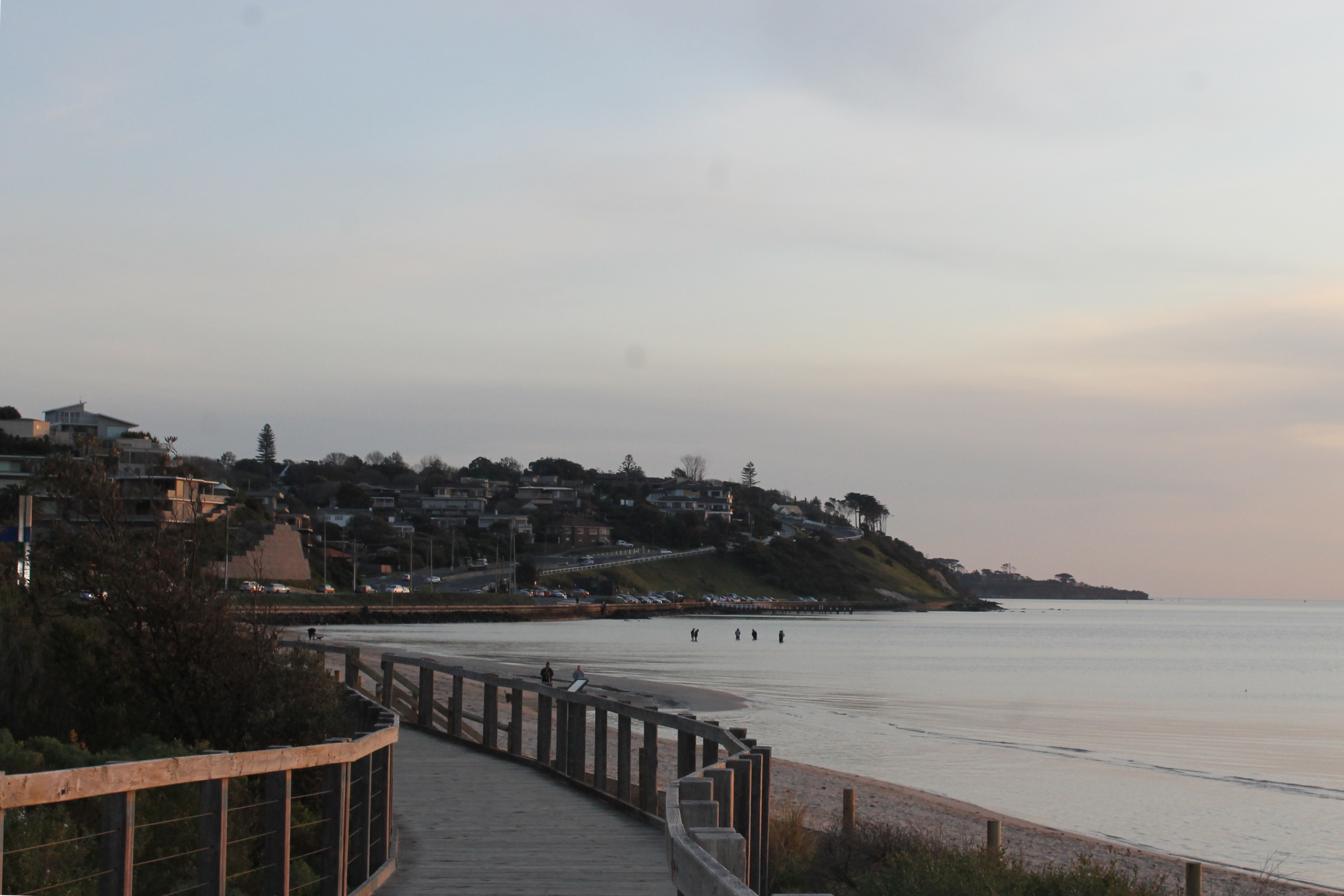
- Olivers Hill from the Frankston Boardwalk.

- Coordinates: 38°9′22″S 145°6′25″E
- Country: Australia
- State: Victoria
- City: Frankston
- LGA: City of Frankston

Government
  - State electorate: Frankston
  - Federal division: Dunkley
- Postcode: 3199
Suburbs around Olivers Hill
	Frankston
Port Phillip	Olivers Hill	Frankston South
	Mount Eliza

Olivers Hill is a locality located in the City of Frankston, Victoria in Australia. It is the first major rise in terrain along the eastern coastline of Port Phillip, between Melbourne and the Mornington Peninsula. It was named after local Frankston fisherman, James Oliver, who built the first cottage atop the hill in the mid-19th century, from where he kept watch for fish in the waters below.

It straddles the suburbs of Frankston and Frankston South, however its borders remain loosely defined. Real estate agents in Melbourne generally refer to any property along the Nepean Highway strip from the Frankston Waterfront in the north, to Humphries Road in the South, as being on Olivers Hill.

Olivers Hill is one of the most sought after residential locations in Frankston, and has the most expensive real estate in the entire City of Frankston. It is also considered to have one of the top ten residential views in Melbourne. In 2015, when the median house price in the suburb of Frankston was A$390,000, properties in the locality were selling for prices between A$3 and A$4 million.

The hill is easily accessible from the Frankston central business district (just over 1 km to the north) by car and on foot via the Nepean Highway and from Cliff Road via Kars Street in Frankston South. It can also be reached by bus services 781, 784 and 785, departing from the Young Street public transport terminus in the Frankston CBD. Olivers Hill is also well known among Melbourne cyclists as being the halfway or turn around point for the 85 km ride from St Kilda along Beach Road, a famous Australian cycling route.

== Gallery ==
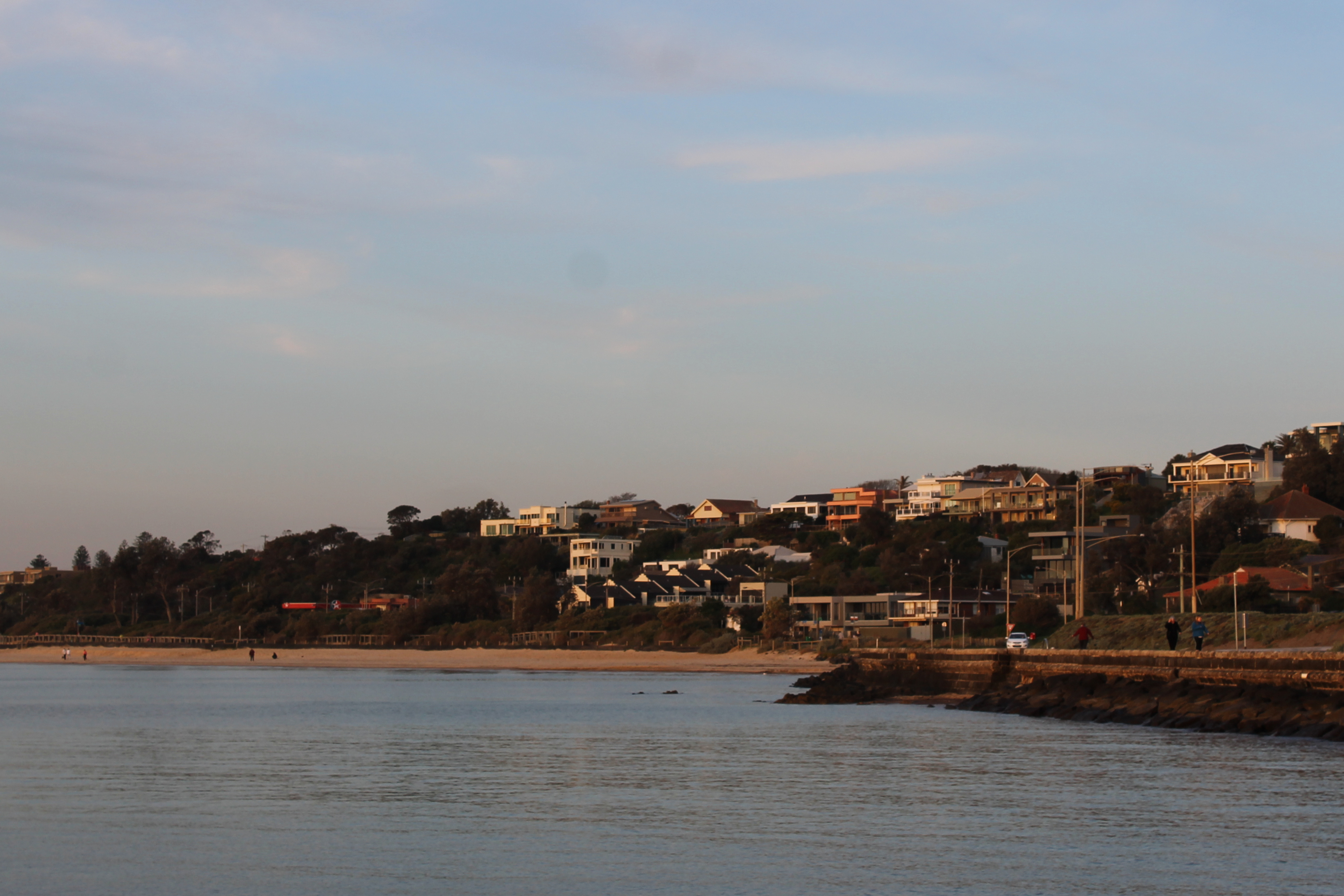
Houses on Olivers Hill

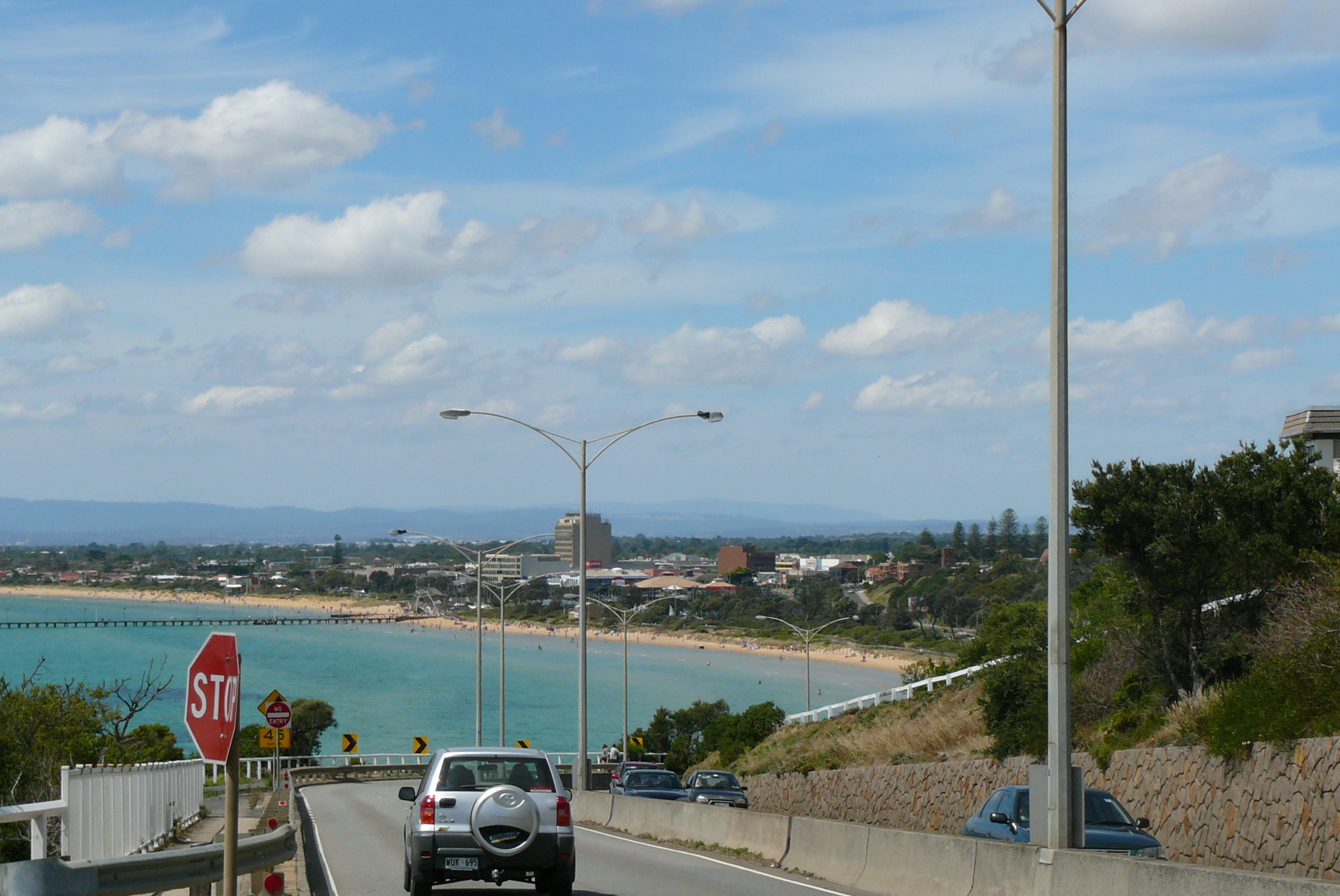
Nepean Highway on Olivers Hill

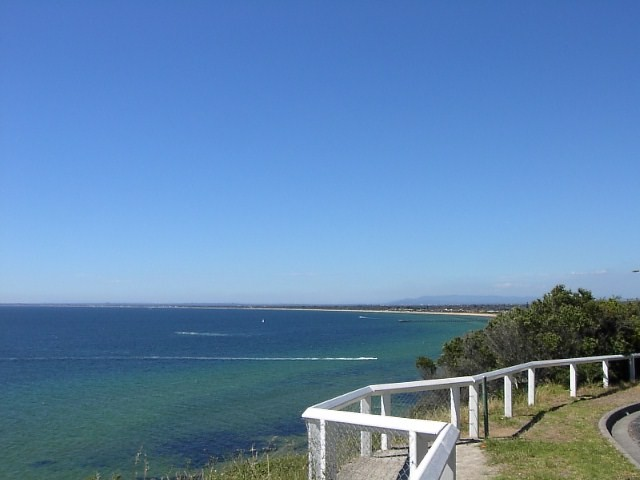
View of Port Phillip from a lookout on Olivers Hill

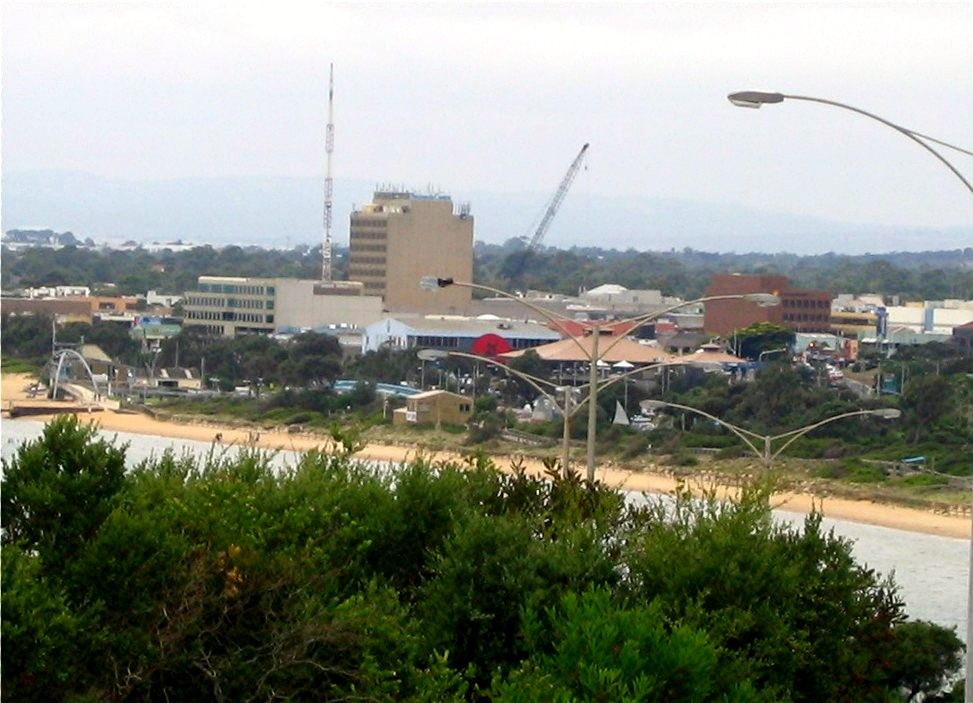

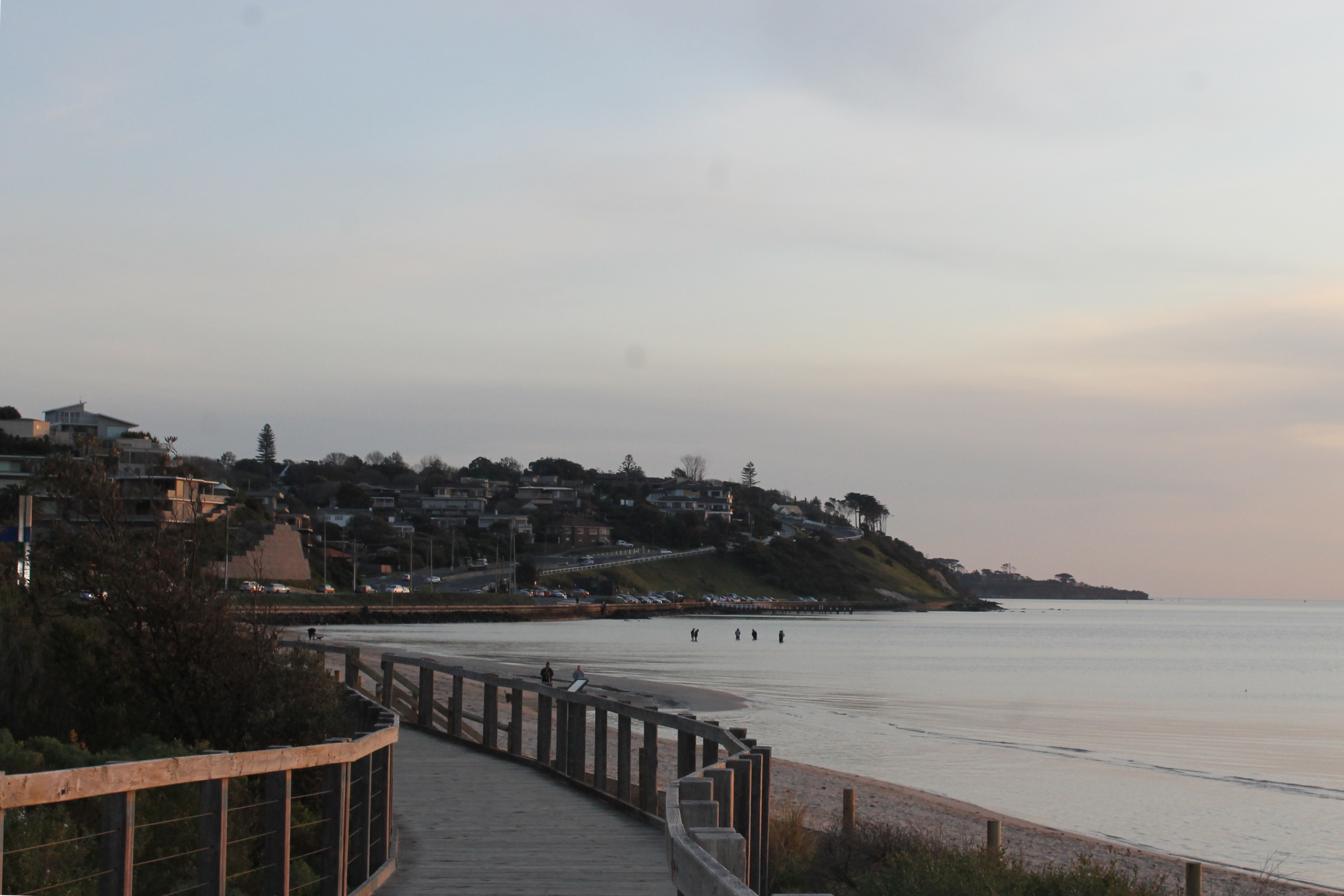

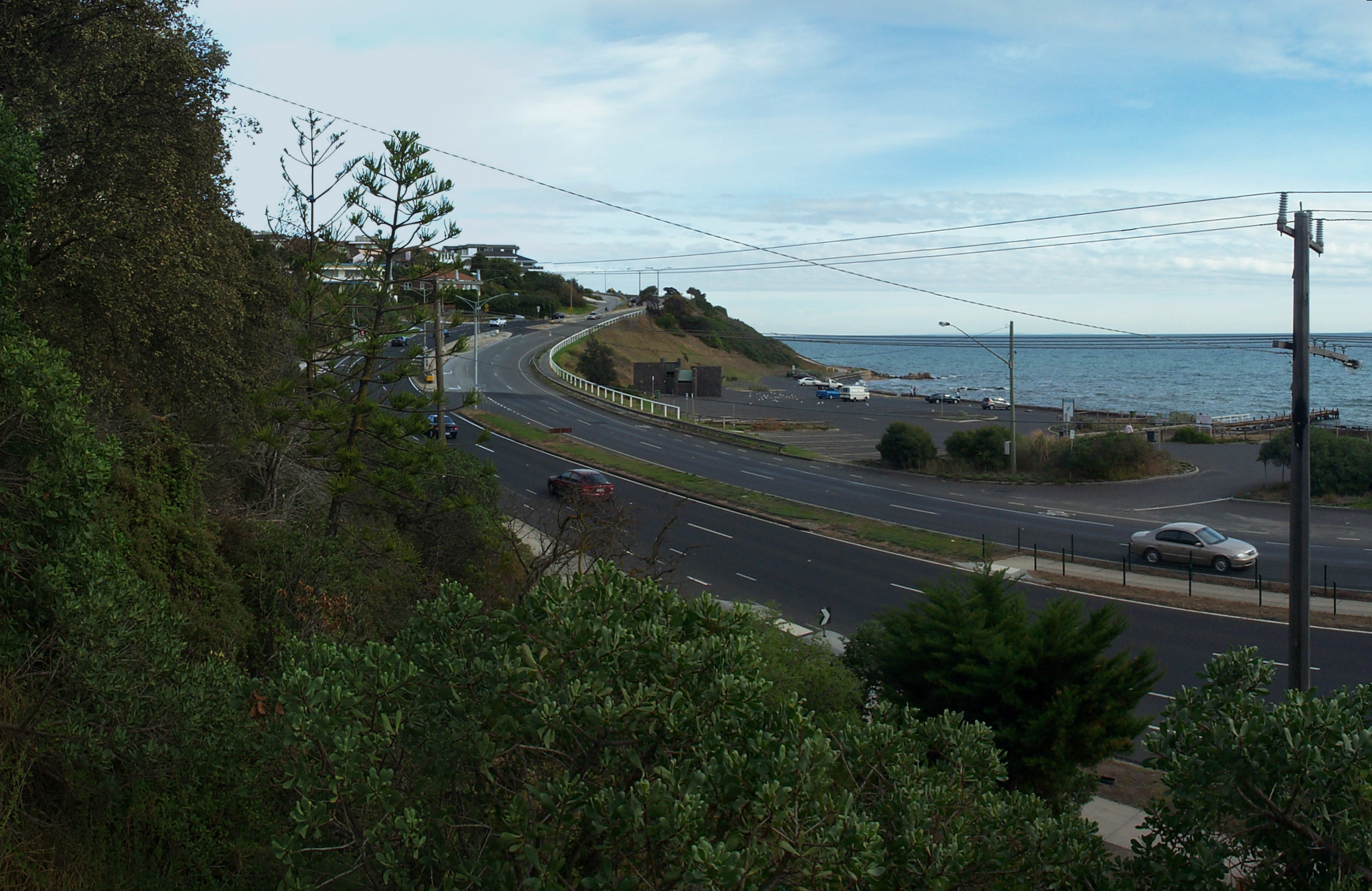

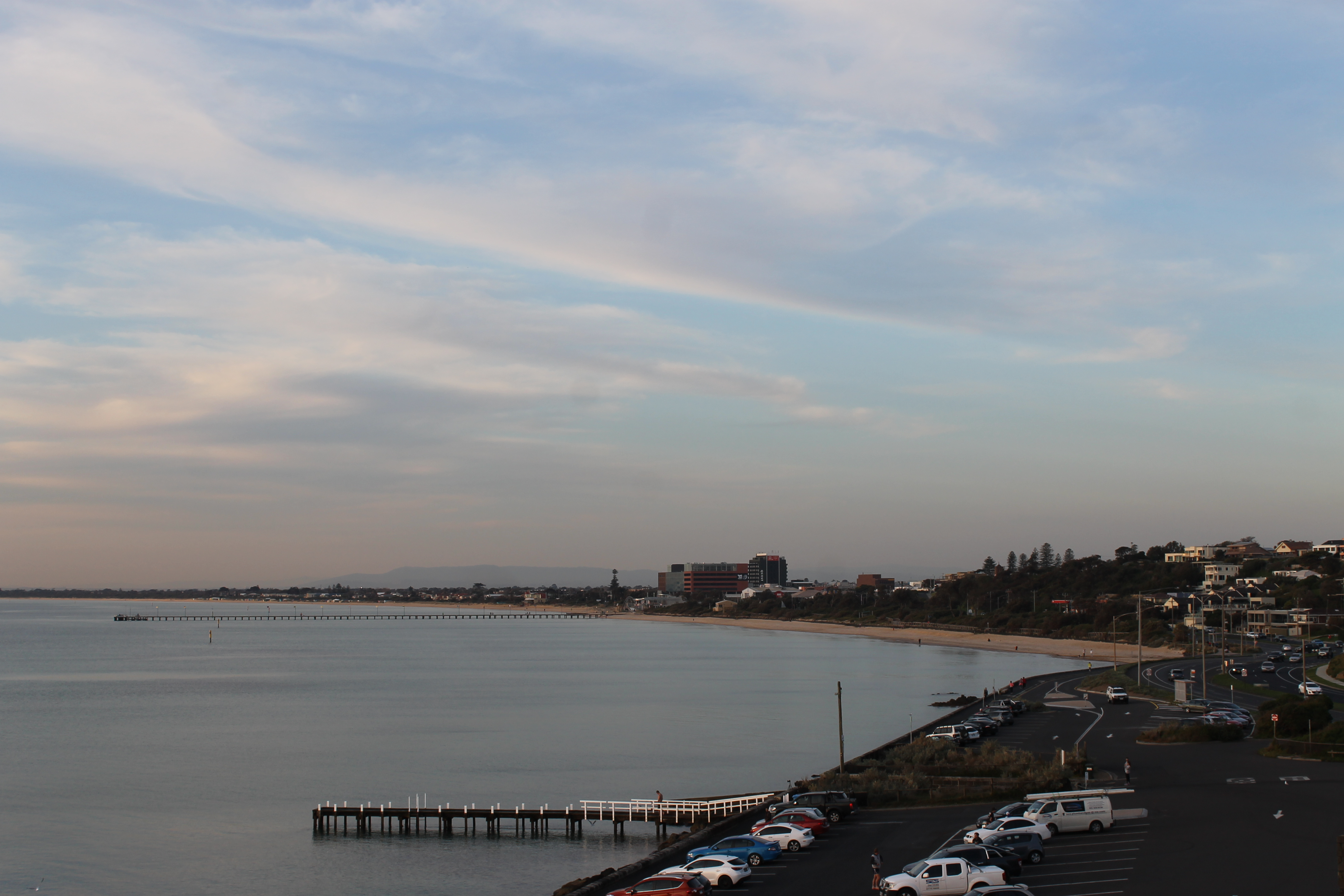

== See also ==
- Frankston and Frankston South⁣-the suburbs, of which Olivers Hill is a locality.
- City of Frankston – the local government area of which Olivers Hill is a part.
- List of people from Frankston – notable people from the City of Frankston (including Olivers Hill).
