= Congested Districts Board =

Congested Districts Board may refer to:

- Congested Districts Board for Ireland
- Congested Districts Board (Scotland)
