= Command Data Buffer =

Command Data Buffer (CDB) was a system used by the United States Air Force's Minuteman ICBM force. CDB was a method to transfer targeting information from a Minuteman Launch Control Center to an individual missile by communications lines. Prior to CDB, new missile guidance would have to be physically loaded at the launch facility; the process usually took hours.

== History ==
The surviving remnant of the Minuteman Command Control System (MICCS), CDB permitted the rapid, remote, retargeting of the Minuteman III fleet. CDB was operational at all Minuteman III wings by 15 Aug 1977. Minuteman II wings had a similar install, designated Improved Launch Control System, providing the older system the potential for remote retargeting.

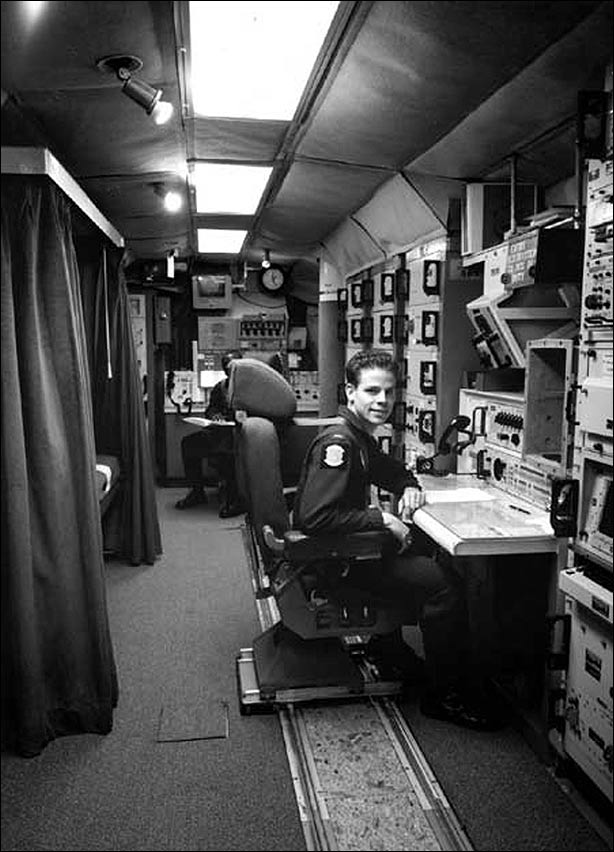
CDB configuration

== Phaseout ==
CDB was replaced in the late 1990s by the Rapid Execution and Combat Targeting system, currently in use by United States ICBM forces.

== See also ==
- LGM-30 Minuteman
- Launch control center (ICBM)
- Improved Launch Control System - Minuteman II upgrade similar to CDB
- Rapid Execution and Combat Targeting System (REACT)
