= Jack McMillan (Australian footballer) =

Australian rules footballer, born 1912

Personal information
- Full name: John Angus McMillan
- Born: 22 September 1912; Casterton, Victoria
- Died: 1 August 1969 (aged 56)
- Original team: Hastings
- Height: 178 cm (5 ft 10 in)
- Weight: 71 kg (157 lb)
- Position: Full-forward

Playing career^{1}
Years	Club	Games (Goals)
1936	Footscray	4 (17)
- ^{1} Playing statistics correct to the end of 1936.

John Angus McMillan (22 September 1912 – 1 August 1969) was an Australian rules footballer who played with Footscray in the Victorian Football League (VFL).

McMillan, a full-forward, kicked a club record 119 goals for Hastings in 1934. He left Mornington Peninsula Football League for the VFL two years later and had an immediate impact.

On his debut, against North Melbourne at Arden Street, he kicked a seven-goal haul. This equaled the VFL record, held by George Moloney and Ernie Sellars. He continued this form with five goals the following week but his run soon ended when he broke a wrist. After he recovered from his injury, McMillan returned, but only to the seconds. He was a member of Footscray's 1936 seconds premiership winning team.
