= Padua College (Melbourne) =

Location
- Mornington, Rosebud, Tyabb, Victoria; Australia; 38°13′06.8″S 145°04′16.7″E

Information
- Type: Catholic high school
- Motto: Omnia Perseverantia Vincit (Perseverance Conquers All)
- Denomination: Roman Catholic
- Established: 1898; 128 years ago
- Founder: The Mercy Sisters
- Principal: Kelly McGurn
- Grades: 7–12 (Mornington); 7–9 (Rosebud); 7–9 (Tyabb)
- Gender: Co-educational
- Enrollment: Approximately 2,521
- Campuses: Mornington, Rosebud and Tyabb
- Colours: Blue, yellow and white
- Newspaper: The Paduan
- Affiliation: Southern Independent Schools
- Website: www.padua.vic.edu.au

Padua College is a Catholic co-educational Secondary College located in Victoria, Australia. The college derives its name from Franciscan friar Saint Anthony of Padua (1195–1231). The Mornington campus alone provides for Approx. 1,921 students from across the Mornington Peninsula. The college also has two smaller campuses that cater for students in years 7–9 in Rosebud and in Tyabb. The Rosebud Campus provides for Approx. 300 students and the Tyabb Campus provides for Approx. 300 students

Facilities at the Mornington campus include the newly established 'Whyte Senior Learning Centre' as well as 'St Clare Performing Arts Centre', bird hide and wetlands/bushland areas, aquarium, drama rooms, art and media rooms, gymnasium, chapel, library, music rooms, tennis courts, basketball courts, food technology rooms, an agriculture/horticulture centre and two ovals, with a new Year 7 & 8 Centre being constructed.

== History ==
In 1898 the Sisters of Mercy opened the College of Our Lady of the Sea Boarding School for Young Ladies in Tanti Avenue, Mornington. In the following year, the Sisters established a separate school, Padua House Preparatory School for Little Boys.

The name 'Padua College' had been assumed by 1950 with the Sisters being encouraged to enrol more day boys and having Padua operating only as a junior boys boarding school. By 1960, there was no longer a need for a boarding school for either sex.

Another important date in Padua College’s history is 1968 when the primary section separated to become St Macartan’s Parish Primary School. Both schools continued to grow and in 1973 plans were drawn up for Padua College to be relocated to Oakbank Road, Mornington, which opened in 1975. An official opening ceremony was held later, in February 1977. As enrolments increased a second campus was established at Inglewood Crescent, Rosebud in 1987 and a third at Tyabb in 2014.

The administration of the College passed from the Sisters of Mercy in 1976 to lay principals, including Bernard McDowell (1977–1983), Peter Gurry (1984–1995), Patricia Cowling (1996–2000), Christopher Houlihan (2001–2015) and Anthony Banks (2016–2022). The present principal Kelly McGurn commenced in June 2023.

== Houses ==
	Australian Church Cluster (RED)	Modern Church Cluster (GREEN)	Franciscan House Cluster (GOLD)	Mercy House Cluster (BLUE)
Mornington Senior Campus (Yr 10–12)	Mackillop	John XXIII	Francis	Mercy
Mornington Senior Campus (Yr 10–12)	Djeembana	Merton	Elizabeth	Bernard
Mornington Junior Campus (Yr 7–9)	Chisholm	Kolbe	Assisi	Frayne
Mornington Junior Campus (Yr 7–9)	Mannix	Romero	Clare	Sebastian
Rosebud Junior Campus (Yr 7–9)	Goold	Teresa	Anthony	McAuley
Tyabb Junior Campus (Yr 7–9)	McCormack	Cardijn	Geoghegan	Doyle

== Campuses ==
=== Mornington ===
The Mornington site is situated on over 14.5 hectares (36 acres) in a rural environment. The Junior Campus offers approximately 768 students from Years 7–9 a comprehensive range of subjects. Year 10, 11 and 12 students are located in the Senior Campus which is separate from the rest of the College. There are approximately 1153 senior students, who may choose to undertake various courses of study including the Victorian Certificate of Education (VCE), the Victorian Certificate of Applied Learning (VCAL) and Vocational Education and Training (VET). Senior Campus facilities include a study centre with networked computers, specialised science and computer laboratories, an agriculture centre and a gymnasium.

=== Rosebud ===
The Rosebud Campus was opened in 1987. The campus is designed on a homestead model. There has been a particular effort to use indigenous plants on the College grounds. The Rosebud Campus students move across to the Mornington Year 10–12 Campus for their senior studies.

=== Tyabb ===
The Tyabb Campus opened in January 2014 and draws upon students who live in the Western Port region. It is located on Frankston Flinders Road at the corner of Western Port Highway. Students at Tyabb Campus are offered the same opportunities as the Year 7–9 students at the Mornington and Rosebud Campuses. The Tyabb Campus students also move across to the Mornington Year 10–12 Campus for their senior studies.

== Sport ==
Padua College is a member of the Southern Independent Schools (SIS).

=== SIS premierships ===
Padua College has won the following SIS senior premierships.

Combined:

- Athletics (11) – 1999, 2000, 2001, 2011, 2012, 2014, 2015, 2016, 2017, 2018, 2019
- Cross Country (32) – 1988, 1989, 1990, 1991, 1992, 1993, 1994, 1995, 1996, 1997, 1998, 1999, 2000, 2001, 2002, 2003, 2004, 2005, 2006, 2007, 2008, 2009, 2010, 2011, 2012, 2013, 2014, 2015, 2016, 2017, 2018, 2019
- Swimming (29) – 1988, 1990, 1991, 1992, 1993, 1994, 1995, 1996, 1997, 1998, 1999, 2000, 2001, 2002, 2003, 2004, 2005, 2006, 2007, 2008, 2009, 2010, 2011, 2012, 2013, 2014, 2015, 2016, 2017

Boys:

- Basketball – 2016 ,2025
- Cricket (3) – 2003, 2009, 2011
- Football (5) – 2001, 2002, 2003, 2017, 2018, 2022,2025
- Indoor Cricket (3) – 2018, 2019, 2020, 2026
- Soccer (2) – 2011, 2015, 2025

Girls:

- Basketball – 2015
- Football (3) – 2005, 2017, 2019
- Netball (4) – 2013, 2014, 2015, 2018
- Soccer – 2019, 2022, 2023

== Notable alumni ==
- Ned Cahill, AFL football player for the Essendon Football Club
- Liz Cambage (born 1991), basketball player in the Israeli Female Basketball Premier League
- Christopher Chung, actor
- Hunter Clark, AFL football player for the St. Kilda Football Club
- Simon Cook, Australian cricketer
- Luke Davies-Uniacke, AFL football player for the North Melbourne Football Club
- Paul Dempsey, solo musician and songwriter, vocalist and guitarist, Something for Kate
- Sam De Koning, AFL football player for the Geelong Football Club
- Tom De Koning, AFL football player for the St Kilda Football Club
- Mitch Hallahan, AFL football player for the Gold Coast Suns
- Will Hamill, AFL football player for the Adelaide Football Club
- Lee Harding, singer
- Bridie Kennedy, AFLW football player for the Carlton Football Club
- Beth Lynch, AFLW football player for the Richmond Football Club
- Tom Lynch, AFL football player for the Richmond Football Club and 2019, 2020 Premiership Player
- Darren Minchington, AFL football player for the St Kilda Football Club
- Myles Poholke, AFL football player for the Adelaide Football Club
- Toby Thurstans, AFL football player for the Port Adelaide Football Club
- Nicky Whelan, actress and model
- Rocco Sinipoli
