= Bill Thorpe =

Australian rules footballer

Personal information
- Full name: William Francis Thorpe
- Born: 7 January 1894; West Melbourne, Victoria
- Died: 6 January 1953 (aged 58); Fitzroy, Victoria
- Original team: Moorabbin
- Height: 180 cm (5 ft 11 in)
- Weight: 74 kg (163 lb)

Playing career^{1}
Years	Club	Games (Goals)
1914	Richmond	2 (2)
1918	Fitzroy	5 (3)
Total		7 (5)
- ^{1} Playing statistics correct to the end of 1918.

William Francis Thorpe (7 January 1894 – 6 January 1953) was an Australian rules footballer who played with Richmond and Fitzroy in the Victorian Football League (VFL).

Thorpe also played with Footscray, Port Melbourne, Northcote, Prahran and Camberwell in the Victorian Football Association.
