= Leigh Gloury =

Australian rules footballer

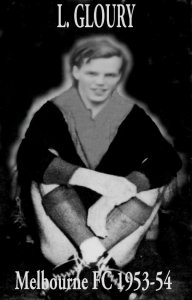

Personal information
- Full name: Leigh Anthony Gloury
- Born: 25 September 1929
- Died: 31 July 2014 (aged 84)
- Original team: Frankston Bombers
- Height: 175 cm (5 ft 9 in)
- Weight: 76 kg (168 lb)

Playing career^{1}
| Years | Club | Games (Goals) |
| 1953–54 | Melbourne | 12 (1) |
- ^{1} Playing statistics correct to the end of 1954.

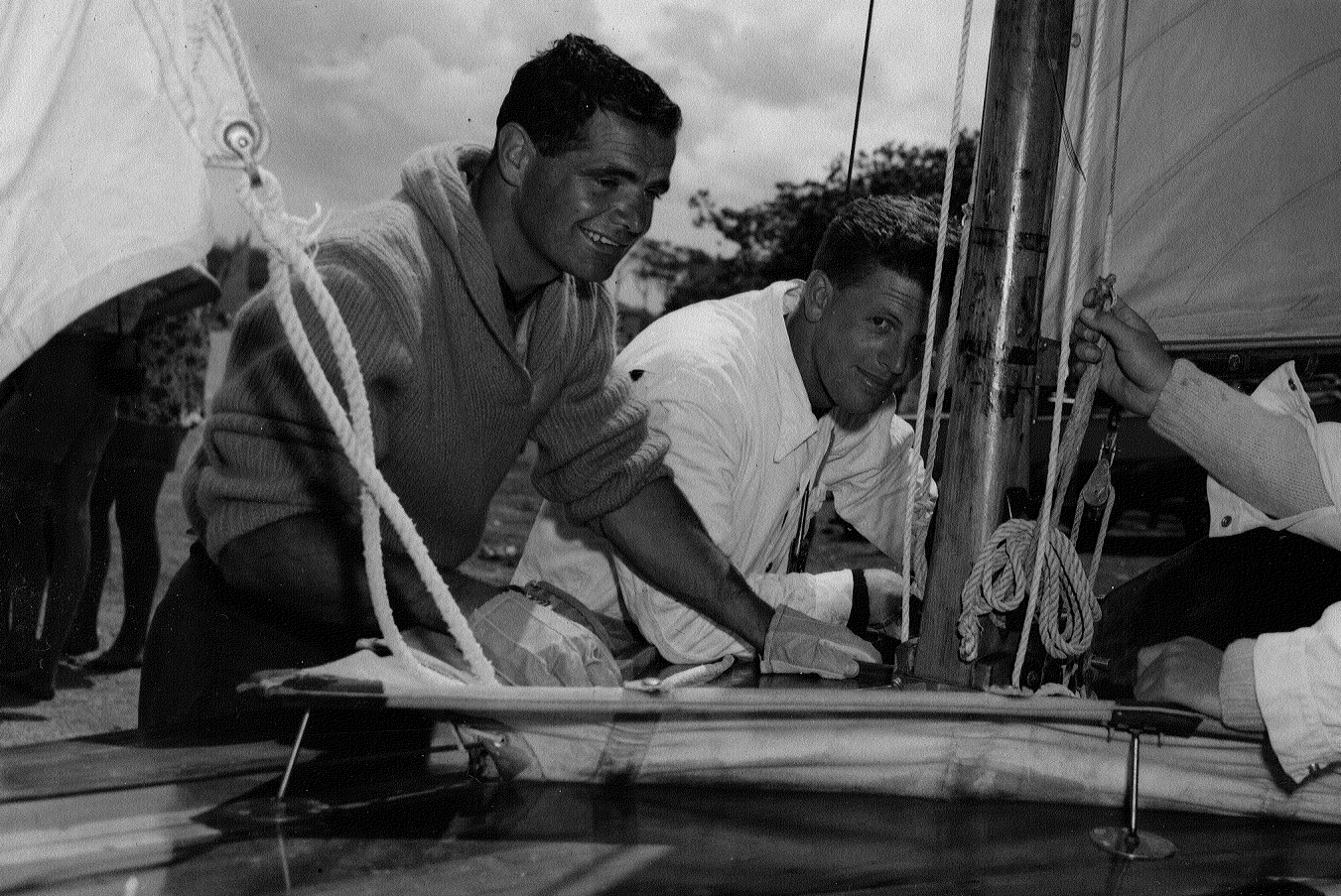
Leigh Gloury (r) and his friend John Barrett (l) working on the yacht Greensleeves, around 1949

Leigh Anthony Gloury (25 September 1929 – 31 July 2014) was an Australian rules footballer who played with Melbourne in the Victorian Football League (VFL).
