= Frankston South =

- Suburb
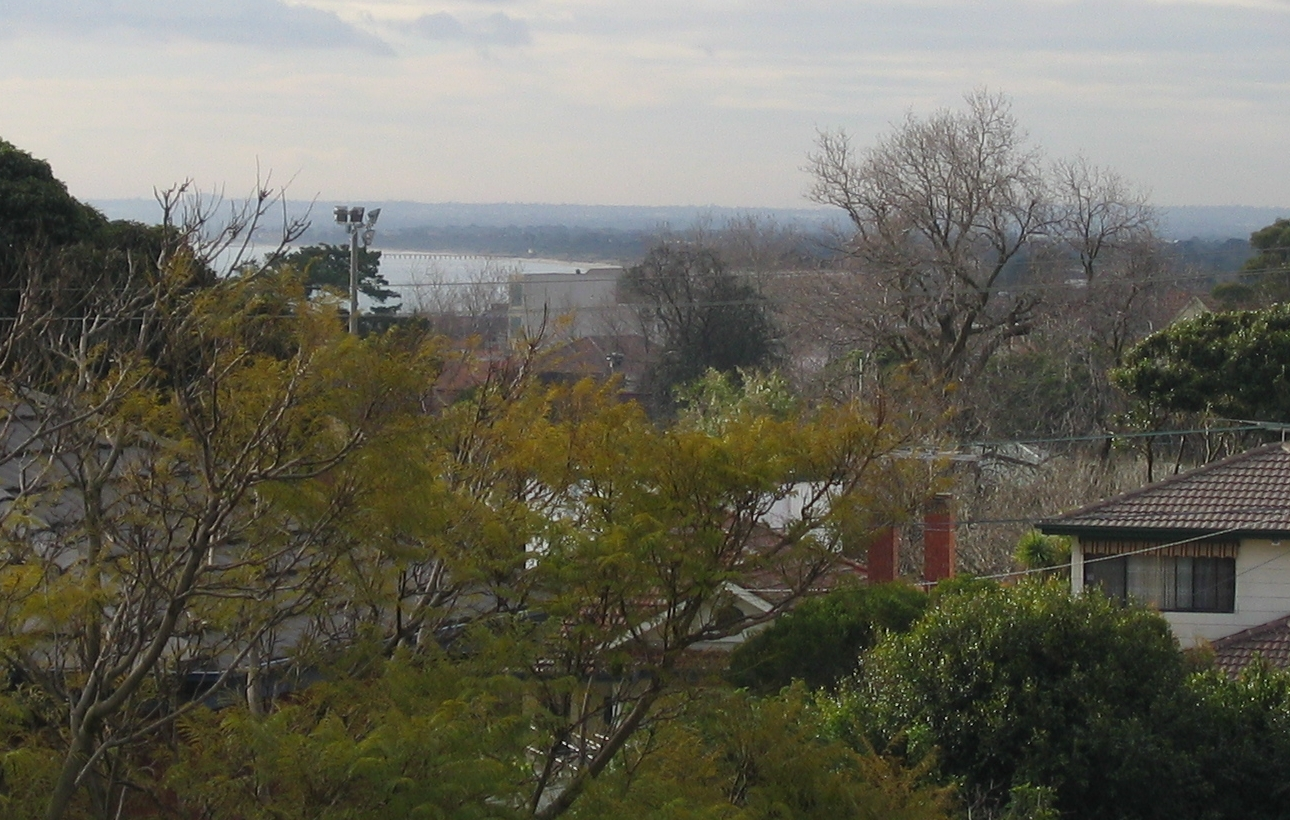
- Rooftops of Frankston South, with glimpses of Port Phillip and Seaford Pier

- Interactive map of Frankston South
- Coordinates: 38.188°S 145.153°E
- Country: Australia
- State: Victoria
- City: Melbourne
- LGA: City of Frankston
- Location: 41 km (25 mi) from Melbourne; 2 km (1.2 mi) from Frankston
- Established: 1846 (land sales: 1854)

Government
  - State electorate: Frankston
  - Federal division: Dunkley

Area
  - Total: 14.8 km^{2} (5.7 sq mi)

Population
  - Total: 18,801 (2021 census)
  - Density: 1,270/km^{2} (3,290/sq mi)
- Postcode: 3199
Suburbs around Frankston South
Port Phillip	Frankston	Langwarrin
Port Phillip	Frankston South	Langwarrin South
Port Phillip	Mount Eliza	Baxter

Frankston South is a suburb in Melbourne, Victoria, Australia, 41 km south-east of Melbourne's central business district, located within the City of Frankston local government area. Frankston South recorded a population of 18,801 at the 2021 census.

Sharing the same postcode as Frankston (3199), it is a separate suburb.

== History ==
After the foundation of Melbourne in 1835, John Davey and his son James took up a land holding in the area in 1846, which extended from Olivers Hill (in the beginnings of what is now Frankston South) to Daveys Bay (in what is now the neighbouring suburb of Mount Eliza). Thomas McComb, who arrived at Frankston in 1852, purchased land from what is now the Frankston Central Business District (CBD) to the south-east in what is now Frankston South, in 1854. Davey's and McComb's land was subdivided and now forms much of the suburb of Frankston South.

The first temporary post office in Frankston South opened in 1934 to service the first Australian Scout Jamboree. The first permanent post office opened on 27 October 1958. From the 1980s, the current post office has been located in a small general store close to where the first Jamboree took place, on the intersection of Overport Road and Yuille Street.

Following the arrival of the railway line in 1882, the Frankston area developed into a popular seaside resort and playground for Melbourne's affluent, with some developing large holiday properties in the area of Frankston South, many of which still stand today.

=== 1935 Scout Jamboree ===
Frankston South was the site of the first Australian Scout Jamboree, in 1935, which was attended by the founder of the Scouting movement, Sir Robert Baden-Powell. The site was chosen for its proximity to the town of Frankston, distance from Melbourne and its relatively unspoilt natural areas as well as access to the beach.

Several streets in Frankston South are named after the event (Baden Powell Drive being the most prominent). The original grandstand used for the jamboree remained a historic landmark at Frankston Park for 72 years, until it was destroyed by fire on 12 February 2008.

== Subdivisions ==
Frankston South is home to the most expensive residential real estate in the City of Frankston, mainly due to its hilly terrain which allows for views of Port Phillip, tree-lined streets, properties built on the edge of Sweetwater Creek Nature Reserve (which is located in the centre of the suburb) and large subdivisions.

Olivers Hill—which straddles the suburbs of Frankston and Frankston South and overlooks Port Phillip—is considered to have one of the best residential views in Melbourne. Property in the locality has sold for between A$3 and A$4 million in 2015, at the same time as the median house price in the suburb of Frankston being A$390,000 and Frankston South median house price is $671,000 in January 2017.

== Schools ==
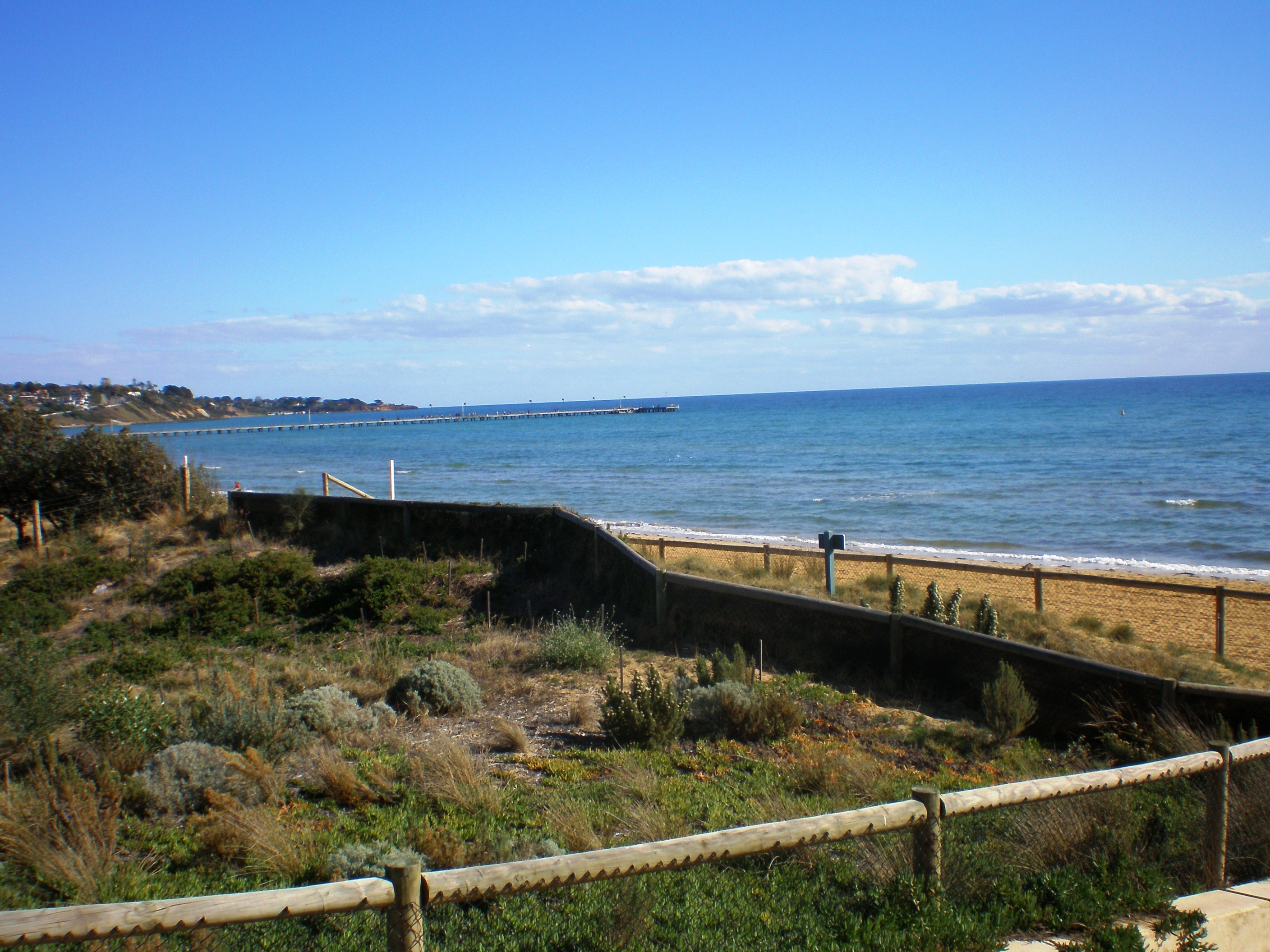
Frankston South Beach

Primary

- Derinya Primary School (government)
- Woodleigh School, junior campus (independent), note: the senior campus is in the neighbouring City of Frankston suburb of Langwarrin South.

Secondary

- Mount Erin Secondary College (government)
- Frankston High School (government)

Frankston High School, which is located on the Frankston/Frankston South border of Towerhill Road, has been noted for its academic performance and extension programs. A 2003 editorial in The Age identified the school as one of a relatively small number of metropolitan government schools with a medial ENTER score about 70. Admittance to the school is determined by residing within its catchment area, of which Frankston South is a part of. Real estate agents market residential properties as being near the school more often than any other, except Balwyn High School, in the Melbourne inner-eastern suburb of Balwyn North. Research from the Real Estate Institute of Victoria (REIV) also identified that properties in the catchment area of the school sell for 16.9% more than others in each suburb, compared with 4% more in Balwyn North.

== Shopping ==
Frankston South has no major shopping areas due to its proximity to the Frankston CBD. However, small neighbourhood shopping strips exist on Norman Avenue, Foot Street and Overport Road. The south of the suburb is served by the shopping village in neighbouring Mount Eliza.

== Infrastructure ==
=== Health ===
Due to its proximity to the Frankston CBD, there is no hospital in Frankston South. However, it is served by the relatively close Frankston Hospital. The area does support a number of health clinics and small surgeries.

=== Transport ===
Frankston South is located close to the Frankston CBD, and much of the suburb is accessible via the small arterials: Kars Street, Baden Powell Drive and Overport Road. It also straddles the Nepean Highway to the west and the Moorooduc Highway to the east. Bus services run throughout the locality, and connect it to the Frankston CBD as well as a number of neighbouring localities and suburbs.

== Sport ==
Mornington Peninsula Pony Club provides dressage, show jumping and cross-country facilities for young equestrian enthusiasts. The club holds its rallies at Baxter Park and is affiliated with the Pony Club Association of Victoria.

Another sporting team located in Frankston South is a cricket club called Baden Powell Cricket Club named after Sir Baden Powell.

Frankston Bombers Football Netball Club is also located on the border of Frankston South and Baxter.

== See also ==
- City of Frankston (former) – Frankston South was previously within this former local government area.
- City of Frankston – Frankston South is located within this local government area.
- List of people from Frankston – notable people from the City of Frankston (including Frankston South).
