= Hastings Football Club =

Hastings

Names
- Full name: Hastings Football & Netball Club
- Nickname: Blues

Club details
- Founded: 1887; 139 years ago
- Colours
- Competition: MPNFL
- Owners: Members
- President: Dan Lehmann
- Coach: Kevin Lylak
- Premierships: (22): 1901, 1904, 1905, 1906, 1907, 1908, 1909, 1910, 1912, 1913, 1914, 1934, 1946, 1947, 1948, 1972, 1975, 1976, 1977, 1992, 1995, 2016
- Ground: Thomas Barclay Oval

Uniforms
Home

The Hastings Football & Netball Club, nicknamed the Blues, is an Australian rules football and netball club based in Hastings, Victoria. The football squad plays in the Mornington Peninsula Nepean Football League (MPNFL) and has won 22 Senior Premierships since its first season in 1887.

At the end of the 2018 season, Hastings finished 6th with 10 wins and 8 losses. In the 2019 season, ex Carlton and Brisbane player Brendan Fevola will play for Hastings. He is expected to play against Tyabb in his debut match for the club.

== Club Records ==
- Senior Premierships (22): 1901, 1904, 1905, 1906, 1907, 1908, 1909, 1910, 1912, 1913, 1914, 1934, 1946, 1947, 1948, 1972, 1975, 1976, 1977, 1992, 1995, 2016
- Highest Senior Score - 52.15.327 vs. Dromana (Round 13, 1929)
- Highest Win - 321 points vs. Dromana (Round 13, 1929)
- Highest Loss - 233 points vs. Mornington (Round 13, 1951)
- Most Senior Games - Peter Hibbert 342
- Most Senior Goals - Luke Hewitt 372

== Senior League Best and Fairest Winners ==
Year won	Player
1947	John Coleman
1948	Robert Stone
1950	Robert Stone
1952	Robert Stone
1953	Robert Stone
1961	Geoff Howells
1963	Felix Strachov
1975	Robbie Burns
1987	George Martin
2001	Chris Kercheval

== AFL Players from Hastings ==
- John Coleman
- Peter Everitt
- Herbert Francis
- Len Incigneri
- Laurie Rymer
- Matthew Incigneri
- Robert Stone
- Pat Foy
- Clem Splatt
- Jack McMillan
