= Langwarrin South =

Langwarrin South Victoria
- Coordinates: 38.189°S 145.189°E
- Population: 1,346 (2021 census)
- Postcode(s): 3911
- Location: 47 km (29 mi) from Melbourne
- LGA(s): City of Frankston
- State electorate(s): Hastings
- Federal division(s): Dunkley; Isaacs
Localities around Langwarrin South:
Frankston	Langwarrin	Pearcedale
Frankston South	Langwarrin South	Pearcedale
Baxter	Baxter	Pearcedale

Langwarrin South is a rural locality in Melbourne, Victoria, Australia, 47 km south-east of Melbourne's central business district, located within the City of Frankston local government area. Langwarrin South recorded a population of 1,346 at the 2021 census.

Langwarrin South is bounded in the north by Robinsons Road, in the east by Dandenong-Hastings Road, in the south by Golf Links and Baxter-Tooradin Roads and in the west by the route of the proposed extension of the Mornington Peninsula Freeway.

== Mulberry Hill ==
Langwarrin South is the location of Mulberry Hill, the former home of Daryl Lindsay and writer Joan Lindsay, author of Picnic at Hanging Rock. Joan Lindsay bequeathed the house to the National Trust of Australia. Situated on Golf Links Road, the house is open to the public.

== Schools ==
- Woodleigh School

== Sport ==
Langwarrin South has a soccer club Langwarrin SC competing in the National Premier League which is the third tier of Australian soccer behind the national A-League.

== See also ==
- City of Frankston – Langwarrin South is located within this local government area
- List of people from Frankston – notable people from the City of Frankston (including Langwarrin South)
