= List of non-government schools in Victoria, Australia =

This is a list of non-government schools in Victoria, Australia. Approximately two-thirds of non-government school students are enrolled in Catholic schools. As such, Catholic schools have been listed separately here.

== Catholic schools ==
=== Catholic primary schools ===
School	Suburb or town	M/F/co-ed	Founded	Website
All Saints Parish School	Portland	Co-ed	1849	website
Annunciation Primary School	Brooklyn	Co-ed	c. 1965	website
Bethany Catholic Primary School	Werribee	Co-ed	1995	website
Cana Catholic Primary School	Hillside	Co-ed	2004	website
Christ the King Catholic Primary School	Newcomb	Co-ed	1965	website
Christ the King Primary School	Braybrook	Co-ed	1955	website
Christ Our Holy Redeemer Primary School	Oakleigh	Co-ed	1958	website
Christ the Priest Primary School	Caroline Springs	Co-ed	2000	website
Clairvaux Catholic School	Belmont	Co-ed	1998	website
Columba Catholic Primary School	Bunyip	Co-ed	2001	website
Corpus Christi Primary School	Glenroy	Co-ed	1955	website
Corpus Christi Primary School	West Footscray	Co-ed	1942	website
Corpus Christi Primary School	Werribee	Co-ed	1985	website
Don Bosco Primary School	Narre Warren	Co-ed	1982	website
Emmaus Catholic Primary School	Mount Clear	Co-ed	2008	website
Emmaus Catholic Primary School	Sydenham	Co-ed	1997	website
Galilee Regional Catholic Primary School	South Melbourne	Co-ed	1994	website
Glowrey Catholic Primary School	Wollert	Co-ed	2019	website
Good Samaritan Catholic Primary School	Roxburgh Park	Co-ed	1996	website
Good Shepherd School	Wheelers Hill	Co-ed	1967	website
Holy Child Primary School	Dallas	Co-ed	1965	website
Holy Cross Catholic Primary School	Mickleham	Co-ed	2022	website
Holy Cross Catholic Primary School	New Gisborne	Co-ed	1996	website
Holy Eucharist Primary School	St. Albans	Co-ed	1975	website
Holy Family Catholic School	Doveton	Co-ed	1960	website
Holy Family Primary School	Bell Park	Co-ed	1955	website
Holy Family School	Mount Waverley	Co-ed	1957	website
Holy Name Primary School	Reservoir	Co-ed	1939	website
Holy Rosary Primary School	White Hills	Co-ed	1918	website
Holy Rosary School	Heathcote	Co-ed	1959	website
Holy Rosary School	Kensington	Co-ed	1916	website
Holy Saviour Primary School	Vermont South	Co-ed	1974	website
Holy Spirit Catholic Primary School	Manifold Heights	Co-ed	2004	website
Holy Spirit Community School	Ringwood North	Co-ed	1976	website
Holy Spirit Primary School	Thornbury	Co-ed	1953	website
Holy Trinity Catholic Primary School	Eltham North	Co-ed	1987	website
Holy Trinity Catholic Primary School	Sunbury	Co-ed	2019	website
Holy Trinity Primary School	Wantirna South	Co-ed	1985	website
Immaculate Heart of Mary Catholic Primary School	Newborough	Co-ed	c. 1962	website
Lisieux Catholic Primary School	Torquay	Co-ed	2018	website
Lumen Christi Catholic Primary School	Point Cook	Co-ed	2000	website
Lumen Christi Primary School	Churchill	Co-ed	1977	website
Lumen Christi Primary School	Delacombe	Co-ed	1990	website
Mary Immaculate School	Ivanhoe	Co-ed	1922	website
Mary MacKillop Primary School	Narre Warren North	Co-ed	1995	website
Mary Queen of Heaven Catholic Primary School	Greenvale	Co-ed	2023	website
Mother of God Catholic Primary School	Ardeer	Co-ed	1955	website
Mother Teresa Catholic Primary School	Craigieburn	Co-ed	2009	website
Nazareth Catholic School	Grovedale	Co-ed	1979	website
Oscar Romero Catholic Primary School	Cragieburn	Co-ed	2018	website
Our Holy Redeemer School	Surrey Hills	Co-ed		website
Our Lady Help of Christians Primary School	Warrnambool	Co-ed		website
Our Lady Help of Christians Primary School	Wendouree	Co-ed	1961	website
Our Lady Help of Christians School	Brunswick East	Co-ed	1911	website
Our Lady Help of Christians School	Eltham	Co-ed	1928	website
Our Lady Help of Christians School	Murtoa	Co-ed	1963	website
Our Lady of the Assumption Parish Primary School	Cheltenham	Co-ed	1951	website
Our Lady of Fatima School	Rosebud	Co-ed	1984	website
Our Lady of Good Counsel School	Deepdene	Co-ed	1924	website
Our Lady of the Immaculate Conception School	Sunshine	Co-ed	1919	website
Our Lady of Lourdes Catholic Primary School	Prahran	Co-ed	1922	website
Our Lady of Lourdes Primary School	Bayswater	Co-ed	1965	website
Our Lady of Mt. Carmel Parish Primary School	Sunbury	Co-ed	1860	website
Our Lady of the Nativity School	Aberfeldie	Co-ed	1958	website
Our Lady of Perpetual Help Primary School	Ringwood	Co-ed	1932	website
Our Lady of Perpetual Succour School	Surrey Hills	Co-ed	1957	website
Our Lady of the Pines Catholic Primary School	Donvale	Co-ed	1978	website
Our Lady of the Rosary Parish School	Kyneton	Co-ed	1981	website
Our Lady of the Sacred Heart Primary School	Elmore	Co-ed	1902	website
Our Lady of the Sacred Heart School	Merbein	Co-ed	1928	website
Our Lady of the Southern Cross Primary School	Manor Lakes	Co-ed		website
Our Lady of the Way Catholic Primary School	Wallan	Co-ed	2019	website
Our Lady of the Way School	Kingsbury	Co-ed	1963	website
Our Lady Star of the Sea Catholic Primary School	Ocean Grove	Co-ed	1982	website
Our Lady Star of the Sea School	Cowes	Co-ed	2018	website
Our Lady's Catholic Primary School	Craigieburn	Co-ed	1980	website
Our Lady's Primary School	Wangaratta	Co-ed	1958	website
Queen of Peace Parish Primary School	Altona Meadows	Co-ed	1982	website
Resurrection Catholic Primary School	Kings Park	Co-ed	1978	website
Resurrection School	Keysborough	Co-ed	1976	website
Sacred Heart Catholic Parish Primary School	St. Albans	Co-ed	1954	website
Sacred Heart Catholic School	Kew	Co-ed	1889	website
Sacred Heart Parish School	Sandringham	Co-ed	1912	website
Sacred Heart Primary School	Casterton	Co-ed	1902	website
Sacred Heart Primary School	Colac	Co-ed	1962	website
Sacred Heart Primary School	Croydon	Co-ed	1993	website
Sacred Heart Primary School	Diamond Creek	Co-ed	1962	website
Sacred Heart Primary School	Mildura	Co-ed	1955	website
Sacred Heart Primary School	Morwell	Co-ed	1884	website
Sacred Heart Primary School	Newport	Co-ed	c. 1900	website
Sacred Heart Primary School	Preston	Co-ed	1915	website
Sacred Heart Primary School	Yarrawonga	Co-ed	1887	website
Sacred Heart School	Corryong	Co-ed	1963	website
Sacred Heart School	Fitzroy	Co-ed	1857	website
Sacred Heart School	Oakleigh	Co-ed	1934	website
Sacred Heart School	Tatura	Co-ed	1900	website
Sacred Heart School	Yea	Co-ed	1957	website
Ss. Michael & John's Primary School	Horsham	Co-ed	1883	website
Ss. Peter & Paul's Catholic Primary School	Doncaster East	Co-ed	1959	website
St. Agatha's Primary School	Cranbourne	Co-ed	1976	website
St. Agnes' Primary School	Highett	Co-ed	1951	website
St. Alipius Parish School	Ballarat East	Co-ed	1853	website
St. Aloysius Catholic Primary School	Queenscliff	Co-ed	1902	website
St. Aloysius School	Redan	Co-ed	1876	website
St. Ambrose Parish Primary School	Woodend	Co-ed	1859	website
St. Andrew's Catholic Primary School	Werribee	Co-ed	1868	website
St. Andrew's Primary School	Clayton South	Co-ed	1981	website
St. Angela of the Cross Primary School	Warragul	Co-ed	2021	website
St. Anne's Catholic Primary School	Seaford	Co-ed	c. 1972	website
St. Anne's Primary School	Kew East	Co-ed	1931	website
St. Anne's Primary School	Park Orchards	Co-ed	1980	website
St. Anne's Primary School	Sunbury	Co-ed	1978	website
St. Anthony's Catholic Primary School	Lara	Co-ed	c. 1992	website
St. Anthony's Primary School	Alphington	Co-ed	c. 1922	website
St. Anthony's Primary School	Glen Huntly	Co-ed		website
St. Anthony's Primary School	Melton South	Co-ed	1979	website
St. Anthony's School	Noble Park	Co-ed	1955	website
St. Augustine's Catholic Primary School	Yarraville	Co-ed	1894	website
St. Augustine's Primary School	Creswick	Co-ed	c. 1857	website
St. Augustine's Primary School	Keilor	Co-ed	1979	website
St. Augustine's Primary School	Maryborough	Co-ed		website
St. Augustine's Primary School	Wodonga	Co-ed	1876	website
St. Augustine's School	Frankston South	Co-ed	1981	website
St. Bede's Primary School	Balwyn North	Co-ed	1945	website
St. Bernard's Catholic Primary School	Coburg	Co-ed	1941	website
St. Bernard's Parish Primary School	Bacchus Marsh	Co-ed	c. 1851	website
St. Bernard's Primary School	Wangaratta	Co-ed		website
St. Bernadette's Catholic Primary School	Sunshine North	Co-ed	1956	website
St. Bernadette's Primary School	Ivanhoe	Co-ed	1952	website
St. Bernadette's Primary School	The Basin	Co-ed	1983	website
St. Brendan's Catholic Primary School	Lakes Entrance	Co-ed	1958	website
St. Brendan's Primary School	Coragulac	Co-ed	1899	website
St. Brendan's Primary School	Dunnstown	Co-ed	1858	website
St. Brendan's Primary School	Shepparton	Co-ed	1891	website
St. Brendan's Primary School	Somerville	Co-ed	1994	website
St. Brendan's School	Flemington	Co-ed	1887	website
St. Bridget's Catholic Primary School	Balwyn North	Co-ed	1959	website
St. Brigid's Catholic Primary School	Healesville	Co-ed	1901	website
St. Brigid's Primary School	Ballan	Co-ed		website
St. Brigid's Primary School	Gisborne	Co-ed	1853	website
St. Brigid's Primary School	Mordialloc	Co-ed	1911	website
St. Brigid's Primary School	Officer	Co-ed		website
St. Carlo Borromeo Catholic Primary School	Greenvale	Co-ed	1987	website
St. Catherine of Siena Catholic Primary School	Armstrong Creek	Co-ed	2020	website
St. Catherine of Siena Catholic Primary School	Melton West	Co-ed	1984	website
St. Catherine's Catholic Primary School	Berwick	Co-ed	1996	website
St. Catherine's Primary School	Lalor	Co-ed	1983	website
St. Catherine's Primary School	Moorabbin	Co-ed	1957	website
St. Cecilia's Primary School	Glen Iris	Co-ed	1932	website
St. Charles Borromeo Catholic Primary School	Templestowe	Co-ed	1983	website
St. Christopher's Primary School	Airport West	Co-ed	1962	website
St. Christopher's Primary School	Glen Waverley	Co-ed	1960	website
St. Clare's Catholic Primary School	Truganina	Co-ed	2015	website
St. Clare's Primary School	Officer	Co-ed	2015	website
St. Clare's Primary School	Thomastown	Co-ed	1977	website
St. Clement of Rome Catholic Primary School	Bulleen	Co-ed	1963	website
St. Colman's School	Mortlake	Co-ed	1951	website
St. Columba's Primary School	Elwood	Co-ed	1918	website
St. Columba's School	Soldiers Hill	Co-ed	1911	website
St. Damian's Primary School	Bundoora	Co-ed	1966	website
St. Dominic's Primary School	Camberwell	Co-ed	1925	website
St. Dominic's Primary School	Melton	Co-ed	1976	website
St. Dominic's School	Broadmeadows	Co-ed	1959	website
St. Elizabeth's School	Dandenong North	Co-ed	1978	website
St. Fidelis Catholic Primary School	Coburg	Co-ed	1927	website
St. Finbar's Primary School	Brighton East	Co-ed	1848	website
St. Francis de Sales Primary School	Lynbrook	Co-ed	2010	website
St. Francis de Sales Primary School	Oak Park	Co-ed	1961	website
St. Francis of Assisi Primary School	Baranduda	Co-ed	2005	website
St. Francis of Assisi Primary School	Mill Park	Co-ed	1981	website
St. Francis of Assisi Primary School	Tarneit	Co-ed	2012	website
St. Francis of the Fields Primary School	Strathfieldsaye	Co-ed	1994	website
St. Francis Primary School	Nathalia	Co-ed	1961	website
St. Francis Xavier Catholic Primary School	Frankston	Co-ed	1928	website
St. Francis Xavier Catholic Primary School	Montmorency	Co-ed	1932	website
St. Francis Xavier Primary School	Ballarat East	Co-ed	1914	website
St. Francis Xavier Primary School	Box Hill	Co-ed	1928	website
St. Francis Xavier Primary School	Corio	Co-ed	1976	website
St. Gabriel's Primary School	Traralgon	Co-ed	1980	website
St. Gabriel's School	Reservoir	Co-ed	1936	website
St. George Preca Primary School	Caroline Springs	Co-ed		website
St. Gerard's Primary School	Dandenong	Co-ed	1957	website
St. Gregory the Great Catholic Primary School	Doncaster	Co-ed	1968	website
St. Ita's Primary School	Drouin	Co-ed		website
St. James the Apostle Catholic Primary School	Hoppers Crossing	Co-ed	1982	website
St. James Catholic Primary School	Brighton	Co-ed	1883	website
St. James' Parish School	Sebastopol	Co-ed	1956	website
St. James Primary School	Nar Nar Goon	Co-ed		website
St. James Primary School	Vermont	Co-ed	1970	website
St. Joachim's Catholic Primary School	Carrum Downs	Co-ed	1987	website
St. Joan of Arc School	Brighton	Co-ed	1921	website
St. John the Apostle Primary School	Tarneit	Co-ed	2015	website
St. John the Baptist Catholic Primary School	Ferntree Gully	Co-ed	1936	website
St. John the Baptist Primary School	Koo Wee Rup	Co-ed	1936	website
St. John Bosco's School	Niddrie	Co-ed	c. 1940	website
St. John Vianney's Catholic Primary School	Mulgrave	Co-ed	1960	website
St. John Vianney's Primary School	Parkdale	Co-ed	1960	website
St. John XXIII Primary School	Thomastown	Co-ed	1974	website
St. John's Catholic Parish Primary School	Heidelberg	Co-ed	c. 1836	website
St. John's Catholic Primary School	Frankston	Co-ed	1967	website
St. John's Catholic School	Footscray	Co-ed	1922	website
St. John's Primary School	Clifton Hill	Co-ed	c. 1892	website
St. John's Primary School	Dennington	Co-ed	1920	website
St. John's Primary School	Mitcham	Co-ed	1960	website
St. John's School	Euroa	Co-ed	1921	website
St. Joseph the Worker Catholic Primary School	Reservoir	Co-ed	1978	website
St. Joseph's Catholic Primary School	Chelsea	Co-ed	1924	website
St. Joseph's Catholic Primary School	Hopetoun	Co-ed	1954	website
St. Joseph's Catholic Primary School	Mernda	Co-ed	2009	website
St. Joseph's Catholic Primary School	Warragul	Co-ed		website
St. Joseph's Catholic Primary School	Werribee	Co-ed	2021	website
St. Joseph's Catholic School	Charlton	Co-ed	1885	website
St. Joseph's Primary School	Beechworth	Co-ed	1857	website
St. Joseph's Primary School	Benalla	Co-ed	1858	website
St. Joseph's Primary School	Black Rock	Co-ed	1928	website
St. Joseph's Primary School	Boronia	Co-ed	1964	website
St. Joseph's Primary School	Chiltern	Co-ed		website
St. Joseph's Primary School	Cobram	Co-ed	1922	website
St. Joseph's Primary School	Collingwood	Co-ed	c. 1860	website
St. Joseph's Primary School	Elsternwick	Co-ed	1933	website
St. Joseph's Primary School	Kerang	Co-ed	1912	website
St. Joseph's Primary School	Korumburra	Co-ed	1914	website
St. Joseph's Primary School	Malvern	Co-ed	1889	website
St. Joseph's Primary School	Nagambie	Co-ed	1871	website
St. Joseph's Primary School	Northcote	Co-ed	1893	website
St. Joseph's Primary School	Numurkah	Co-ed	1890	website
St. Joseph's Primary School	Orbost	Co-ed	1923	website
St. Joseph's Primary School	Penshurst	Co-ed	1874	website
St. Joseph's Primary School	Quarry Hill	Co-ed	1907	website
St. Joseph's Primary School	Red Cliffs	Co-ed	1933	website
St. Joseph's Primary School	Rochester	Co-ed	1893	website
St. Joseph's Primary School	Sorrento	Co-ed	1932	website
St. Joseph's Primary School	Springvale	Co-ed	1938	website
St. Joseph's Primary School	Trafalgar	Co-ed	1930	website
St. Joseph's Primary School	Warrnambool	Co-ed	1851	website
St. Joseph's Primary School	Yarra Junction	Co-ed	1958	website
St. Joseph's School	Brunswick West	Co-ed	1913	website
St. Joseph's School	Coleraine	Co-ed	1861	website
St. Joseph's School	Crib Point	Co-ed	1927	website
St. Joseph's School	Hawthorn	Co-ed	1854	website
St. Joseph's School	Wonthaggi	Co-ed	1912	website
St. Jude's Catholic Primary School	Scoresby	Co-ed	1972	website
St. Jude's Primary School	Langwarrin	Co-ed	1978	website
St. Justin's Parish Primary School	Wheelers Hill	Co-ed	1984	website
St. Kevin's Catholic Primary School	Templestowe Lower	Co-ed	1970	website
St. Kevin's Primary School	Hampton Park	Co-ed	1988	website
St. Kieran's Catholic Primary School	Moe	Co-ed	1950	website
St. Kilian's Primary School	Bendigo	Co-ed	c. 1850	website
St. Laurence O'Toole Primary School	Leongatha	Co-ed	1913	website
St. Lawrence of Brindisi Primary School	Weir Views	Co-ed	2022	website
St. Lawrence Primary School	Derrimut	Co-ed	2010	website
St. Leo the Great Primary School	Altona North	Co-ed	1971	website
St. Leonard's Catholic Primary School	Glen Waverley	Co-ed	1959	website
St. Liborius Catholic Primary School	Eaglehawk	Co-ed	1904	website
St. Louis de Montfort's Primary School	Aspendale	Co-ed	1965	website
St. Luke the Evangelist School	Blackburn South	Co-ed	1962	website
St. Luke's Catholic Primary School	Shepparton	Co-ed	2005	website
St. Luke's Primary School	Lalor	Co-ed	1961	website
St. Luke's Primary School	Wantirna	Co-ed	1979	website
St. Macartan's Parish Primary School	Mornington	Co-ed	1898	website
St. Malachy's School	Edenhope	Co-ed	1953	website
St. Margaret Mary's Primary School	Brunswick	Co-ed	1913	website
St. Margaret Mary's Primary School	Spotswood	Co-ed	1954	website
St. Margaret's Primary School	East Geelong	Co-ed	1949	website
St. Margaret's Primary School	Maribyrnong	Co-ed	1957	website
St. Mark's Catholic Parish Primary School	Fawkner	Co-ed	1934	website
St. Mark's Primary School	Dingley Village	Co-ed	1974	website
St. Martin de Porres Catholic Primary School	Laverton	Co-ed	1972	website
St. Martin de Porres Parish School	Avondale Heights	Co-ed	1965	website
St. Martin of Tours Primary School	Rosanna	Co-ed	1958	website
St. Mary MacKillop Catholic Primary School	Bannockburn	Co-ed	2018	website
St. Mary MacKillop Primary School	Keilor Downs	Co-ed	1984	website
St. Mary Magdalen's Parish School	Chadstone	Co-ed	1954	website
St. Mary of the Cross Catholic Primary School	Point Cook	Co-ed	2014	website
St. Mary of the Cross MacKillop Catholic Parish Primary School	Epping	Co-ed	2013	website
St. Mary's Catholic Primary School	Ascot Vale	Co-ed	1913	website
St. Mary's Catholic Primary School	Hastings	Co-ed	1917	website
St. Mary's Catholic Primary School	Mount Evelyn	Co-ed	1980	website
St. Mary's Catholic Primary School	Sale	Co-ed	c. 1865	website
St. Mary's Catholic Primary School	Warracknabeal	Co-ed	1901	website
St. Mary's Catholic Primary School	Williamstown	Co-ed	1842	website
St. Mary's Parish Primary School	Ararat	Co-ed	c. 1850	website
St. Mary's Parish Primary School	Greensborough	Co-ed	1955	website
St. Mary's Parish Primary School	Whittlesea	Co-ed	1983	website
St. Mary's Primary School	Alexandra	Co-ed	1953	website
St. Mary's Primary School	Altona	Co-ed	1928	website
St. Mary's Primary School	Bairnsdale	Co-ed		website
St. Mary's Primary School	Castlemaine	Co-ed	1854	website
St. Mary's Primary School	Clarkes Hill	Co-ed	1946	website
St. Mary's Primary School	Colac	Co-ed	1849	website
St. Mary's Primary School	Dandenong	Co-ed	1912	website
St. Mary's Primary School	Donald	Co-ed	1885	website
St. Mary's Primary School	Geelong	Co-ed	1842	website
St. Mary's Primary School	Hamilton	Co-ed	1858	website
St. Mary's Primary School	Hampton	Co-ed	1924	website
St. Mary's Primary School	Inglewood	Co-ed	1860	website
St. Mary's Primary School	Lancefield	Co-ed	1885	website
St. Mary's Primary School	Maffra	Co-ed	1905	website
St. Mary's Primary School	Malvern East	Co-ed	1918	website
St. Mary's Primary School	Mansfield	Co-ed	1869	website
St. Mary's Primary School	Mooroopna	Co-ed	1936	website
St. Mary's Primary School	Myrtleford	Co-ed	1923	website
St. Mary's Primary School	Rushworth	Co-ed	1954	website
St. Mary's Primary School	Sea Lake	Co-ed	1958	website
St. Mary's Primary School	St. Kilda East	Co-ed	1853	website
St. Mary's Primary School	Swan Hill	Co-ed	1919	website
St. Mary's Primary School	Thornbury	Co-ed	1920	website
St. Mary's Primary School	Yarram	Co-ed	1918	website
St. Mary's School	Cohuna	Co-ed	1926	website
St. Mary's School	Echuca	Co-ed	1887	website
St. Mary's School	Robinvale	Co-ed		website
St. Mary's School	Rutherglen	Co-ed	1901	website
St. Matthew's Catholic Primary School	Fawkner	Co-ed	1961	website
St. Mel's Primary School	Shepparton South	Co-ed	1957	website
St. Michael's Parish School	Ashburton	Co-ed	1946	website
St. Michael's Primary School	Berwick	Co-ed	1962	website
St. Michael's Primary School	Heyfield	Co-ed	1954	website
St. Michael's Primary School	North Melbourne	Co-ed	1868	website
St. Michael's Primary School	Tallangatta	Co-ed	1958	website
St. Michael's Primary School	Traralgon	Co-ed		website
St. Michael's School	Daylesford	Co-ed	1892	website
St. Monica's Catholic Primary School	Footscray	Co-ed	1857	website
St. Monica's Catholic Primary School	Kangaroo Flat	Co-ed	1859	website
St. Monica's Parish Primary School	Moonee Ponds	Co-ed	1856	website
St. Monica's Primary School	Wodonga	Co-ed	1973	website
St. Oliver Plunkett Catholic Parish Primary School	Pascoe Vale	Co-ed	1942	website
St. Patrick's Catholic Primary School	Lilydale	Co-ed	1864	website
St. Patrick's Catholic Primary School	Stawell	Co-ed	1858	website
St. Patrick's Catholic School	Murrumbeena	Co-ed	1946	website
St. Patrick's Parish Primary School	Ballarat Central	Co-ed	1864	website
St. Patrick's Parish Primary School	Mentone	Co-ed	1904	website
St. Patrick's Parish Primary School	Port Fairy	Co-ed	1849	website
St. Patrick's Primary School	Geelong West	Co-ed	1911	website
St. Patrick's Primary School	Kilmore	Co-ed	1848	website
St. Patrick's Primary School	Koroit	Co-ed	1850	website
St. Patrick's Primary School	Pakenham	Co-ed		website
St. Patrick's Primary School	Pyramid Hill	Co-ed	1956	website
St. Patrick's Primary School	St. Arnaud	Co-ed		website
St. Patrick's Primary School	Stratford	Co-ed	1864	website
St. Patrick's School	Camperdown	Co-ed	1886	website
St. Patrick's School	Gordon	Co-ed	1864	website
St. Patrick's School	Nhill	Co-ed	1949	website
St. Patrick's School	Tongala	Co-ed	1959	website
St. Patrick's School	Wangaratta	Co-ed	1854	website
St. Paul the Apostle Catholic Primary School	Doreen	Co-ed	2015	website
St. Paul Apostle North School	Endeavour Hills	Co-ed	1985	website
St. Paul Apostle South Catholic Primary School	Endeavour Hills	Co-ed	1980	website
St. Paul's Primary School	Coburg	Co-ed	1851	website
St. Paul's Primary School	Kealba	Co-ed	1978	website
St. Paul's Primary School	Mildura	Co-ed	1974	website
St. Paul's Primary School	Monbulk	Co-ed	1984	website
St. Paul's Primary School	Sunshine West	Co-ed	1956	website
St. Paul's School	Bentleigh	Co-ed	1928	website
St. Peter Apostle Primary School	Hoppers Crossing	Co-ed	1973	website
St. Peter Chanel Catholic Primary School	Deer Park	Co-ed	1955	website
St. Peter Julian Eymard Primary School	Mooroolbark	Co-ed	c. 1968	website
St. Peter's Catholic Primary School	South West Sunshine	Co-ed	1979	website
St. Peter's Primary School	Clayton	Co-ed	1955	website
St. Peter's Primary School	Epping	Co-ed	1853	website
St. Peter's Primary School	Keilor East	Co-ed	1971	website
St. Peter's Primary School	Long Gully	Co-ed	1972	website
St. Peter's School	Bentleigh East	Co-ed	1865	website
St. Philip's Catholic Primary School	Blackburn North	Co-ed	1965	website
St. Pius X Catholic Primary School	Heidelberg West	Co-ed	1954	website
St. Pius X Parish School	Warrnambool	Co-ed	1962	website
St. Raphael's Primary School	West Preston	Co-ed	1936	website
St. Richard's Catholic Primary School	Kilsyth	Co-ed	1984	website
St. Robert's Primary School	Newtown	Co-ed	1942	website
St. Roch's Parish Primary School	Glen Iris	Co-ed	1930	website
St. Scholastica's Primary School	Burwood	Co-ed	1959	website
St. Simon the Apostle Primary School	Rowville	Co-ed	1982	website
St. Stephen's School	Reservoir	Co-ed	1957	website
St Teresa of Kolkata Catholic Primary School	Tarneit North	Co-ed	2024	website
St. Theresa's Primary School	Albion	Co-ed	1951	website
St. Therese Catholic Primary School	Torquay	Co-ed	1986	website
St. Therese's Primary School	Cranbourne North	Co-ed	1989	website
St. Therese's Primary School	Kennington	Co-ed	1956	website
St. Therese's School	Essendon	Co-ed	1923	website
St. Thomas the Apostle Catholic Primary School	Cranbourne East	Co-ed	2014	website
St. Thomas the Apostle Primary School	Blackburn	Co-ed	1952	website
St. Thomas the Apostle Primary School	Greensborough	Co-ed	1979	website
St. Thomas Aquinas Primary School	Norlane	Co-ed	1954	website
St. Thomas More Catholic Primary School	Alfredton	Co-ed	1980	website
St. Thomas More Catholic Primary School	Belgrave	Co-ed	1962	website
St. Thomas More Primary School	Hadfield	Co-ed	1965	website
St. Thomas More Primary School	Mount Eliza	Co-ed	1981	website
St. Thomas Primary School	Drysdale	Co-ed	1997	website
St. Thomas' Primary School	Sale	Co-ed	1970	website
St. Thomas' Primary School	Terang	Co-ed	1907	website
St. Timothy's Primary School	Vermont	Co-ed	1967	website
St. Vincent de Paul Primary School	Morwell	Co-ed		website
St. Vincent de Paul Primary School	Strathmore	Co-ed	1937	website
School of the Good Shepherd	Gladstone Park	Co-ed	c. 1960	website
Siena Catholic Primary School	Lucas	Co-ed	2017	website
Stella Maris Catholic Primary School	Beaumaris	Co-ed	1956	website
Stella Maris Catholic Primary School	Point Cook	Co-ed	2006	website
Trinity Catholic Primary School	Narre Warren South	Co-ed	2000	website
Trinity Primary School	Richmond	Co-ed	1935	website

=== Catholic secondary and K–12 schools ===
School	Suburb or town	M/F/co-ed	Years	Founded	Website
Academy of Mary Immaculate	Fitzroy	F	7–12	1857	website
Antonine College	Coburg, Pascoe Vale South	Co-ed	P–12	2005	website
Aquinas College	Ringwood	Co-ed	7–12	1961	website
Assumption College	Kilmore	Co-ed	7–12	1893	website
Ave Maria College	Aberfeldie	F	7–12	1963	website
Avila College	Mount Waverley	F	7–12	1965	website
Caroline Chisholm Catholic College	Braybrook	Co-ed	7–12	1997	website
Catherine McAuley College	Junortoun, Bendigo	Co-ed	7–12	2018	website
Catholic College	Sale	Co-ed	7–12	1979	website
Catholic College	Wodonga	Co-ed	7–12	1979	website
Catholic Ladies' College	Eltham	F	7–12	1902	website
Catholic Regional College	Caroline Springs	Co-ed	7–10	2007	website
Catholic Regional College	Keilor Lodge	Co-ed	7–10	1982	website
Catholic Regional College	St. Albans	Co-ed	7–10	1978	website
Catholic Regional College	Sydenham	Co-ed	11–12	1982	website
Clonard College	Herne Hill	F	7–12	1956	website
Damascus College	Mount Clear	Co-ed	7–12	1995	website
De La Salle College	Malvern	M	5–12	1912	website
Emmanuel College	Altona North	Co-ed	7–12	2006	website
Emmanuel College	Warrnambool	Co-ed	7–12	1991	website
Emmaus College	Vermont South	Co-ed	7–12	1980	website
FCJ College	Benalla	Co-ed	7–12	1900	website
Galen Catholic College	Wangaratta	Co-ed	7–12	1982	website
Genazzano FCJ College	Kew	F	P–12	1891	website
Iona College	Charlemont	Co-ed	7–12	2020	website
John Paul College	Frankston	Co-ed	7–12	1979	website
Kilbreda College	Mentone	F	7–12	1904	website
Killester College	Springvale	F	7–12	1955	website
Kolbe Catholic College	Greenvale	Co-ed	7–12	2008	website
Lavalla Catholic College	Traralgon	Co-ed	7–12	1962	website
Loreto College	Ballarat Central	F	7–12	1875	website
Loreto Mandeville Hall	Toorak	F	P–12	1924	website
Loyola College	Watsonia	Co-ed	7–12	1980	website
MacKillop College	Werribee	Co-ed	7–12	1970	website
Marcellin College	Bulleen	M	7–12	1950	website
Marian College	Ararat	Co-ed	7–12	1888	website
Marian College	Myrtleford	Co-ed	7–12	1968	website
Marian College	Sunshine West	F	7–12	1957	website
Marist College	Maiden Gully	Co-ed	P–12	2015	website
Marist-Sion College	Warragul	Co-ed	7–12	1975	website
Mary MacKillop Catholic Regional College	Leongatha	Co-ed	7–12	1986	website
Marymede Catholic College	South Morang	Co-ed	P–12	2006	website
Mater Christi College	Belgrave	F	7–12	1963	website
Mazenod College	Mulgrave	M	7–12	1967	website
Mercy College	Coburg	F	7–12	1965	website
Mercy Regional College	Camperdown	Co-ed	7–12	1973	website
Monivae College	Hamilton	Co-ed	7–12	1954	website
Mount Lilydale Mercy College	Lilydale	Co-ed	7–12	1896	website
Mount St. Joseph Girls' College	Altona	F	7–12	1964	website
Nagle College	Bairnsdale	Co-ed	7–12	1958	website
Nazareth College	Noble Park North	Co-ed	7–12	1986	website
Notre Dame College	Shepparton	Co-ed	7–12	1984	website
Our Lady of Mercy College	Heidelberg	F	7–12	1910	website
Our Lady of the Sacred Heart College	Bentleigh	F	7–12	1938	website
Our Lady of Sion College	Box Hill	F	7–12	1928	website
Padua College	Mornington	Co-ed	7–12	1898	website
Parade College	Bundoora	M	7–12	1871	website
Penola Catholic College	Broadmeadows	Co-ed	7–12	1995	website
Sacré Cœur School	Glen Iris	F	P–12	1888	website
Sacred Heart College	Kyneton	Co-ed	7–12	1889	website
Sacred Heart College	Newtown	F	7–12	1860	website
Sacred Heart College	Yarrawonga	Co-ed	7–12	1883	website
Sacred Heart Girls' College	Hughesdale	F	7–12	1957	website
St. Aloysius College	North Melbourne	Co-ed	7–12	1887	website
St. Anne's College	Kialla	Co-ed	P–12	2019	website
St Augustine's College	Kyabram	Co-ed	P–12	1904	website
St Bede's College	Mentone, Bentleigh East	M	7–12	1938	website
St Bernard's College	Essendon West	M	7–12	1969	website
St Brigid's College	Horsham	Co-ed	7–12	1919	website
St Columba's College	Essendon	F	7–12	1897	website
St Francis' College (formerly CRC Melton)	Melton West	Co-ed	7–12	1980	website
St Francis Xavier College	Beaconsfield	Co-ed	7–12	1978	website
St Ignatius College	Drysdale	Co-ed	7–12	1991	website
St John's Regional College	Dandenong	Co-ed	7–12	1958	website
St Joseph's College	Echuca	Co-ed	7–12	1886	website
St Joseph's College	Ferntree Gully	M	7–12	1965	website
St Joseph's College	Mildura	Co-ed	7–12	1906	website
St Joseph's College	Newtown	M	7–12	1854	website
St Kevin's College	Toorak	M	P–12	1918	website
St Mary MacKillop College	Swan Hill	Co-ed	7–12	1987	website
St Mary of the Angels College	Nathalia	Co-ed	7–12	1961	website
St Mary's College	Seymour	Co-ed	P–12	1900	website
St Mary's College	St Kilda East	Co-ed	7–12	1878	website
St Monica's College	Epping	Co-ed	7–12	1964	website
St Patrick's College	Ballarat Central	M	7–12	1893	website
St Peter's College	Cranbourne	Co-ed	7–12	1994	website
St Thomas Aquinas College	Tynong	Co-ed	P–12	1997	website
Salesian College	Chadstone	M	7–12	1956	website
Salesian College	Sunbury	Co-ed	7–12	1929	website
Santa Maria College	Northcote	F	7–12	1904	website
Siena College	Camberwell	F	7–12	1940	website
Simonds Catholic College	West Melbourne	M	7–12	1996	website
Star of the Sea College	Brighton	F	7–12	1883	website
Thomas Carr College	Tarneit	Co-ed	7–12	1997	website
Trinity College	Colac	Co-ed	7–12	1979	website
Whitefriars College	Donvale	M	7–12	1961	website
Xavier College	Kew	M	P–12	1878	website

== Independent and private schools ==
School	Suburb or town	M/F/co-ed	Years	Category	Founded	Website
Adass Israel School	Elsternwick	Co-ed	P–12	Jewish	1952	
Aitken College	Greenvale	Co-ed	P–12	Uniting	1999	website
Al Iman College	Melton	Co-ed	P–12	Islamic		website
Al Siraat College	Epping	Co-ed	P–12	Islamic	2009	website
Al-Taqwa College	Truganina	Co-ed	P–12	Islamic	1986	website
Alice Miller School	Macedon	Co-ed	7–12	Non-denominational	2016	website
All Saints Anglican School	Shepparton	Co-ed	P-8	Anglican	2024	website
Alphington Grammar School	Alphington	Co-ed	P–12	Non-denominational	1989	website
Australian Christian College	Benalla	Co-ed	P–10	Non-denominational	1988	website
Australian International Academy	Coburg	Co-ed	P–12	Islamic	1983	website
Australian Islamic Centre College		Co-ed	P-6	Islamic	2023	[ website]
Bacchus Marsh Grammar School	Maddingley, Aintree, Staughton Vale	Co-ed	P–12	No religious affiliation	1988	website
Bairnsdale Christian College	Bairnsdale	Co-ed	P–10	Christian	1998	website
Balcombe Grammar School	Mount Martha	Co-ed	P–12	Non-denominational	2007	website
Ballarat Christian College	Sebastopol	Co-ed	P–12	Christian	1985	website
Ballarat Clarendon College	Newington	Co-ed	P–12	Uniting	1864	website
Ballarat Grammar School	Wendouree	Co-ed	P–12	Anglican	1911	website
Ballarat Steiner School	Mount Helen	Co-ed	P–6	Rudolf Steiner	2000	website
Bayside Christian College	Langwarrin South	Co-ed	P–12	Christian	1982	website
Bayview College	Portland	Co-ed	7–12	Inter-denominational	1976	website
Beaconhills College	Pakenham	Co-ed	P–12	Christian	1982	website
Beechworth Montessori School	Beechworth	Co-ed	P–6	Montessori	2007	website
Belgrave Heights Christian School	Belgrave Heights	Co-ed	P–12	Presbyterian	1983	website
Beth Rivkah Ladies College	St. Kilda East	F	P–12	Jewish	1956	website
Bialik College	Hawthorn	Co-ed	P–12	Jewish	1942	website
Billanook College	Mooroolbark	Co-ed	P–12	Uniting	1980	website
Braemar College	Woodend	Co-ed	5–12	Inter-denominational	1976	website
Brighton Grammar School	Brighton	M	P–12	Anglican	1882	website
Camberwell Girls Grammar School	Canterbury	F	P–12	Anglican	1920	website
Camberwell Grammar School	Canterbury	M	P–12	Anglican	1886	website
Candlebark School	Romsey	Co-ed	P–7	Non-denominational	2006	website
Carey Baptist Grammar School	Kew, Donvale, Bulleen, Banksia Peninsula	Co-ed	P–12	Baptist	1923	website
Casey Grammar School	Cranbourne East	Co-ed	P–12	Inter-denominational	1994	website
Castlemaine Steiner School & Kindergarten	Muckleford	Co-ed	P–8	Rudolf Steiner	1990	website
Cathedral College	Wangaratta	Co-ed	P–12	Anglican	2003	website
Caulfield Grammar School	Wheelers Hill, Malvern, Caulfield, Yarra Junction	Co-ed	P–12	Anglican	1881	website
Chairo Christian School	Drouin, Leongatha, Pakenham, Traralgon	Co-ed	P–12	Christian	1983	website
Cheder Levi Yitzchok	St Kilda	Co-ed	P–9	Jewish		
Christ Church Grammar School	South Yarra	Co-ed	P–6	Anglican	1876	website
Christian College	Belmont, Torquay, Drysdale, Highton, Waurn Ponds	Co-ed	P–12	Inter-denominational	1980	website
Christway College (formerley Heatherton Christian College)	Clarinda	Co-ed	P–12	Christian	1999	website
Clyde Grammar	Cranbourne East	Co-ed	P–3, growing to year 12	Non-denominational	2020	
Cobram Anglican Grammar School (formerly Christ The King Anglican College)	Cobram	Co-ed	P–12	Anglican	2000	website
Cornish College	Bangholme	Co-ed	P–12	Uniting	2012	website
Covenant College	Bell Post Hill	Co-ed	P–12	Christian	1979	website
Creek Street Christian College	Bendigo	Co-ed	P–12	Christian	1981	website
Dandenong Ranges Steiner School	Emerald, Menzies Creek	Co-ed	P–6	Rudolf Steiner	1999	website
Darul Ulum College of Victoria	Fawkner	Co-ed	P–12	Islamic	1997	website
Daylesford Dharma School	Daylesford	Co-ed	P–6	Buddhist	2009	website
Deutsche Schule Melbourne	Fitzroy North	Co-ed	P–8	No religious affiliation	2007	website
Divrei Emineh	Ormond	Co-ed	P–7	Jewish		
Donvale Christian College	Donvale	Co-ed	P–12	Christian	1975	website
East Preston Islamic College	Preston	Co-ed	P–12	Islamic	1998	website
Edinburgh College (formerly Lilydale Adventist Academy)	Lilydale	Co-ed	P–12	Adventist	1967	website
Eltham College	Research	Co-ed	P–12	Non-denominational	1973	website
Erasmus Primary School	Hawthorn	Co-ed	P–6	Practical philosophy/Advaita	1996	website
Fernbrook School (formerly Maxwell Creative School)	Basin	Co-ed	P–8	Independent	2019	website
Fintona Girls' School	Balwyn	F	P–12	Non-denominational	1896	website
Firbank Grammar School	Brighton, Sandringham	Co-ed & F	P–12	Anglican	1909	website
Fitra Community School	Clayton South	Co-ed	P–6	Islamic	202?	
Fitzroy Community School	Fitzroy North	Co-ed	P–8	Non-denominational	1976	website
Flinders Christian Community College	Tyabb, Carrum Downs, Mount Martha	Co-ed	P–12	Non-denominational	1983	website
Freshwater Creek Steiner School	Freshwater Creek	Co-ed	P–6	Rudolf Steiner	2000	website
Geelong Baptist College	Lovely Banks	Co-ed	P–12	Baptist	2002	website
Geelong College	Newtown	Co-ed	P–12	Uniting	1861	website
Geelong Grammar School	Newtown, Corio, Merrijig, Toorak	Co-ed	P–12	Anglican	1855	website
Geelong Lutheran College	Armstrong Creek, Newtown	Co-ed	P–12	Lutheran	2009	website
Ghilgai School	Kilsyth	Co-ed	P–6	Rudolf Steiner	1982	website
Gilson College	Taylors Hill	Co-ed	P–12	Adventist	1988	website
Gippsland Grammar School	Sale, Wy Yung	Co-ed	P–12	Anglican	1924	website
Girton Grammar School	Bendigo	Co-ed	P–12	Non-denominational	1884	website
Glenroy Private	Glenroy	Co-ed	P–12	Islamic	2012	website
Global Village Learning (formerly Gisborne Montessori School)	New Gisborne	Co-ed	P–12	Montessori	2000	website
Good News Lutheran College	Tarneit	Co-ed	P–12	Lutheran	1997	website
Good Shepherd College	Hamilton	Co-ed	P–12	Lutheran	1962	website
Good Shepherd Lutheran Primary School	Croydon Hills	Co-ed	P–6	Lutheran	1979	website
Goulburn Valley Grammar School	Shepparton	Co-ed	5–12	Non-denominational	1982	website
Grace Christian College (formerly Mount Carmel Christian School)	Leneva	Co-ed	P–12	Christian	1981	website
Haileybury College	Berwick, Brighton, Melbourne, Keysborough	Co-ed	P–12	Uniting	1892	website
Hamilton and Alexandra College	Hamilton	Co-ed	P–12	Uniting	1871	website
Harkaway Hills College	Narre Warren North	F & Co-ed	P–12	PARED	2016	
Heathdale Christian College	Werribee, Kurunjang	Co-ed	P–12	Christian	1982	website
Henderson College	Mildura	Co-ed	P–10	Adventist	1951	website
Heritage College	Ferntree Gully	Co-ed	P–12	Christadelphian	2010	website
Heritage College	Narre Warren South, Officer	Co-ed	P–12	Adventist	1999	website
Highview College	Maryborough	Co-ed	7–12	Inter-denominational	1974	website
Hillcrest Christian College	Clyde North	Co-ed	P–12	Christian	1981	website
Hoa Nghiem Buddhist College	Springvale South	Co-ed	P–6	Buddhist	2016	
Holmes Institute	Melbourne	Co-ed	11–12	Inter-denominational	1963	website
Holy Trinity Lutheran College	Horsham	Co-ed	P–12	Lutheran	1978	website
Hume Anglican Grammar	Mickleham, Donnybrook	Co-ed	P–12	Anglican	2008	website
Huntingtower School	Mount Waverley	Co-ed	P–12	Christian	1927	website
Ilim College of Australia	Dallas	Co-ed	P–12	Islamic	1995	website
Islamic College of Melbourne	Tarneit	Co-ed	P–12	Islamic	2011	website
Islamic College of Sport	Tarneit	Co-ed	11-12	Islamic	2024	[ website]
Ivanhoe Girls' Grammar School	Ivanhoe	F	P–12	Anglican	1903	website
Ivanhoe Grammar School	Ivanhoe, Doreen, Macleod	Co-ed	P–12	Anglican	1915	website
The Japanese School of Melbourne	Caulfield South	Co-ed		No religious affiliation	1986	website
Kardinia International College	Bell Post Hill	Co-ed	P–12	Non-denominational	1996	website
Kerang Christian College	Kerang	Co-ed	P–12	Christian	1983	website
Kilvington Grammar School	Ormond	Co-ed	P–12	Baptist	1923	website
King David School	Armadale	Co-ed	P–12	Jewish	1978	website
King's College	Warrnambool	Co-ed	P–12	Presbyterian	1986	website
Kingswood College	Box Hill South	Co-ed	P–12	Uniting	1890	website
The Knox School	Wantirna South	Co-ed	P–12	Non-denominational	1982	website
Korowa Anglican Girls' School	Glen Iris	F	P–12	Anglican	1890	website
Lakeside College	Pakenham	Co-ed	P–12	Lutheran	2006	website
Lauriston Girls' School	Armadale	F	P–12	Non-denominational	1901	website
Learning Co-Op Alternative Primary School	Cottles Bridge	Co-ed	P–6	Alternative/co-operative	1973	website
Leibler Yavneh College	Elsternwick	Co-ed	P–12	Jewish	1961	website
Lighthouse Christian College	Keysborough	Co-ed	P–12	Christian	1989	website
Lighthouse Christian College	Cranbourne	Co-ed	P–12	Christian	2000	website
Little Yarra Steiner School	Yarra Junction	Co-ed	P–12	Rudolf Steiner	1985	website
Lowther Hall Anglican Grammar School	Essendon	F	P–12	Anglican	1920	website
Luther College	Croydon Hills	Co-ed	7–12	Lutheran	1964	website
Lysterfield Lake College	Narre Warren North	M	3–6	PARED	2016	
Maharishi School	Reservoir	Co-ed	P–6	No religious affiliation	1997	website
Mansfield Steiner School	Mansfield	Co-ed	P–12	Rudolf Steiner	1986	website
Maranatha Christian School	Endeavour Hills, Doveton, Officer	Co-ed	P–12	Christian	1970	website
Melbourne Girls' Grammar School	South Yarra	F	P–12	Anglican	1893	website
Melbourne Grammar School	Melbourne, Caulfield, South Yarra	Co-ed & M	P–12	Anglican	1858	website
Melbourne Montessori School	Caulfield South, Brighton East	Co-ed	P–12	Montessori	1976	website
Melbourne Rudolf Steiner School	Warranwood	Co-ed	P–12	Rudolf Steiner	1972	website
Melton Christian College	Brookfield	Co-ed	P–12	Christian	1985	website
Mentone Girls' Grammar School	Mentone	F	P–12	Anglican	1899	website
Mentone Grammar School	Mentone	Co-ed	P–12	Anglican	1923	website
Mernda Hills Christian College	Mernda	Co-ed	P-12	Adventist	2013	website
Methodist Ladies' College	Kew	F	P–12	Uniting	1882	website
Mildura Christian College	Irymple	Co-ed	P–10	Christian	1981	website
Minaret College	Springvale, Officer, Doveton	Co-ed	P–12	Islamic	1992	website
Mooroolbark Grammar (formerly Yarralinda School)	Mooroolbark	Co-ed	P–7	Scientology	2022	website
Mount Evelyn Christian School	Montrose	Co-ed	P–12	Christian	1973	website
Mt. Hira College	Keysborough	Co-ed	P–12	Islamic	2000	website
Mount Scopus Memorial College	Burwood, Caulfield South, St. Kilda East	Co-ed	P–12	Jewish	1949	website
Muhammadiyah Australia College	Melton	Co-ed		Islamic		website
My College	Dallas	Co-ed	P–6	Islamic		website
Newhaven College	Rhyll	Co-ed	P–12	Inter-denominational	1980	website
Newmark Primary School (formerly Sandridge School and Lunineer Academy)	Williamstown	Co-ed	P–6	Independent	2016	website
Nhill Lutheran School	Nhill	Co-ed	P–6	Lutheran	1977	website
North-Eastern Montessori School (formerly Plenty Valley International Montessori School)	St Helena	Co-ed	P–6	Montessori	1976	website
Northside Christian College	Bundoora	Co-ed	P–12	Christian	1979	website
Nunawading Christian College	Nunawading	Co-ed	P–12	Adventist	1964	website
Oakleigh Grammar	Oakleigh	Co-ed	P–12	Greek Orthodox	1983	website
Olivet Christian College	Campbells Creek	Co-ed	P–10	Christian	1979	website
OneSchool Global Vic (formerly Glenvale School)	Various	Co-ed	3–12	Exclusive Brethren	2001	
Overnewton Anglican Community College	Keilor, Taylors Lakes	Co-ed	P–12	Anglican	1987	website
Oxley Christian College	Chirnside Park	Co-ed	P–12	Christian	1979	website
Ozford College	Melbourne	Co-ed	10–12	No religious affiliation	2003	website
Peninsula Grammar	Mount Eliza	Co-ed	P–12	Anglican	1961	website
Penleigh and Essendon Grammar School	Keilor East, Essendon, Moonee Ponds	Co-ed	P–12	Uniting	1977	website
Phillip Island Village School	Ventnor	Co-ed	P–6		2020	
Plenty Valley Christian College	Doreen	Co-ed	P–12	Christian	1981	website
Presbyterian Ladies' College	Burwood	F	P–12	Presbyterian	1875	website
Preshil, the Margaret Lyttle Memorial School	Kew	Co-ed	P–12	Non-denominational	1931	website
Red Rock Christian College	Sunbury	Co-ed	P–12	Inter-denominational	1997	website
River City Christian College	Echuca	Co-ed	P–10	Christian	1985	website
Rivercrest Christian College	Clyde North	Co-ed	P–12	Christian	2014	website
Ruyton Girls' School	Kew	F	P–12	Non-denominational	1878	website
St Andrews Christian College	Wantirna South	Co-ed	P–12	Presbyterian	1983	website
St Catherine's School	Toorak	F	P–12	Non-denominational	1896	website
St. John's Greek Orthodox College	Preston	Co-ed	P–12	Greek Orthodox	1979	website
St John's Lutheran Primary School	Portland	Co-ed	P–6	Lutheran	1980	website
St Leonard's College	Brighton East	Co-ed	P–12	Uniting	1914	website
St Margaret's Berwick Grammar	Berwick	Co-ed	P–12	Non-denominational	1926	website
St Mary's Coptic Orthodox College	Coolaroo	Co-ed	P–12	Coptic Orthodox	1991	website
St Michael's Grammar School	St. Kilda	Co-ed	P–12	Anglican	1895	website
St Paul's Anglican Grammar School	Warragul, Traralgon, Drouin	Co-ed	P–12	Anglican	1982	website
St Peter's Lutheran School	Dimboola	Co-ed	P–6	Lutheran	1958	website
Scotch College	Hawthorn	M	P–12	Presbyterian	1851	website
Shepparton Christian College	Shepparton	Co-ed	P–12	Christian	1997	website
Sholem Aleichem College	Elsternwick	Co-ed	P–6	Jewish	1975	website
Sidrah Gardens School	Narre Warren North	Co-ed	P–6	Islamic		website
Sirius College	Dallas, Broadmeadows, Keysborough, Shepparton, Sunshine West	Co-ed	P–12	No religious affiliation	1997	website
Sophia Mundi Steiner School	Abbotsford	Co-ed	P–12	Rudolf Steiner	1985	website
Southern Cross Grammar	Caroline Springs	Co-ed	P–12	Non-denominational	2011	website
Stott's College	Melbourne	Co-ed	11–12			website
Strathcona Girls' Grammar School	Canterbury	F	P–12	Baptist	1924	website
Sunshine Christian School	Sunshine North	Co-ed	P–6	Lutheran	1982	website
Swan Hill Christian College (formerly Son Centre Christian College)	Swan Hill	Co-ed	P–6	Christian	1993	website
Tarrington Lutheran School	Tarrington	Co-ed	P–6	Lutheran	1853	website
Taylors College	Melbourne	Co-ed	10–12	No religious affiliation	1920	website
Tintern Grammar	Ringwood East	Co-ed	P–12	Anglican	1877	website
Toorak College	Mount Eliza	Co-ed & F	P–12	Non-denominational	1874	website
Trinity Grammar School	Kew	M	P–12	Anglican	1902	website
Trinity Lutheran College	Mildura	Co-ed	P–10	Lutheran	1982	website
Victory Christian College	Strathdale	Co-ed	P–12	Pentecostal	1995	website
Victory Lutheran College	Wodonga	Co-ed	P–12	Lutheran	1992	website
Village School	Croydon North	Co-ed	P–6	No religious affiliation	1982	website
Waverley Christian College	Wantirna South, Narre Warren South	Co-ed	P–12	Christian	1978	website
Wesley College	Elsternwick, Glen Waverley, Windsor	Co-ed	P–12	Uniting	1866	website
Westbourne Grammar School	Truganina, Newport	Co-ed	P–12	Non-denominational	1867	website
Wild Cherry School	Bairnsdale	Co-ed	P–6	Rudolf Steiner	2013	website
Woodleigh School	Frankston, Mooroduc, Langwarrin South	Co-ed	P–12	Non-denominational	1856	website
Woodline Primary	Ceres	Co-ed	P–6			website
Worawa Aboriginal College	Healesville	F		Australian Aboriginal	1983	website
Yarra Valley Grammar	Ringwood	Co-ed	P–12	Anglican	1966	website
Yeshivah College	St. Kilda East	M	P–12	Jewish	1955	website
Yesodei Hatorah College	Elwood	M	P–12	Jewish	2003	

== Special and alternative schools ==
School	Suburb or town	M/F/co-ed	Years	Category	Founded	Website
Advance College of Education Incorporated	Rosebud	Co-ed	10–12	Special/alternative		
Albury Wodonga Community College	Wodonga	Co-ed		Non-denominational	2006	website
Alia College	Hawthorn East	Co-ed		No religious affiliation	1999	website
Andale School	Kew	Co-ed		Special school	1981	website
Berengarra School	Box Hill North	Co-ed	7–12	Specialist/alternative non-denominational trauma-informed	1977	website
Berry Street School	Noble Park, Morwell, Shepparton, Ballarat	Co-ed		Special/alternative	2003	website
Borinya Wangaratta Community Partnership	Wangaratta	Co-ed		Catholic		website
Cheshire School	Glen Waverley	Co-ed		Special/alternative	1977	website
Cire Community School	Yarra Junction, Mount Evelyn, Berwick	Co-ed		Special/alternative		website
The Currajong School	Malvern East	Co-ed		Special school	1974	website
David Scott School	Fitzroy	Co-ed	10–12	Special/alternative		
Djerriwarrh Community College	Melton	Co-ed	10-12	Special/alternative		website
Doxa School	Bendigo	Co-ed		Catholic	2006	website
EdSpace Education and Training Centre	Benalla	Co-ed		Special school	2008	website
Frank Dando Sports Academy	Ashwood	M		No religious affiliation	1982	website
Giant Steps Melbourne	Kew	Co-ed	P–12	Special	2016	
Gippsland Community College	Warragul, Pakenham	Co-ed		No religious affiliation	2009	website
Hester Hornbrook Academy	Melbourne	Co-ed		Special/Alternative		
Ignatius Learning Centre	Richmond	M		Catholic		website
Indie School Wodonga	Wodonga	Co-ed	9–12	Special		
Kamaruka Education Centre	South Yarra	M		Special/alternative	2001	website
Koonwarra Village School	Koonwarra	Co-ed	P–6	Alternative	2012	website
Lyrebird College	Coldstream	Co-ed	P–10	Special		
MacKillop Education	Whittington, Maidstone, Caulfield	Co-ed		Catholic	2011	website
Mansfield Autism Statewide Services	Mansfield, Dookie	Co-ed		Special school	1976	website
Melbourne Indigenous Transition School	Richmond	Co-ed	7–8	Special		
Mountain District Community College	Ferntree Gully	Co-ed	10–12			website
Narre Community Learning Centre	Narre Warren	Co-ed				website
Plenty River College	South Morang	Co-ed	10–12			
PRACE College (Preston Reservoir Adult Community Education)	Ventnor	Co-ed	10–12	Special/alternative		
River Nile School	Melbourne	Co-ed	11–12	Special		
Rossbourne School	Hawthorn	Co-ed		Non-denominational	1967	website
St Joseph's Flexible Learning Centre	North Melbourne, Geelong	Co-ed		Catholic	2012	website
St Mary's College for the Deaf	Wantirna South	Co-ed		Catholic	1947	website
St Paul's College	Balwyn	Co-ed		Catholic	2015	website
SEDA College	Hawthorn East	Co-ed	11–12			
Shepparton ACE Secondary College	Shepparton	Co-ed	11–12	No religious affiliation	2010	website
Tombolo Academy	Hampton	Co-ed	3–10	Special		website
Village High School	Ryanston	Co-ed		Alternative		website
Youth2Industry College	South Melbourne	Co-ed	10–12	Alternative		website

== Closed schools ==
School	Suburb or town	Category	Opened	Closed	Notes
Acacia College	Mernda	Uniting Church	2010	2012	Became a campus of Gilson College
Alexandra College	Hamilton	Independent girls	1871	1962	Merged into Hamilton and Alexandra College
Ballarat College	Ballarat	Independent boys	1864	1974	Merged into Ballarat Clarendon College
Cathedral College	East Melbourne	Catholic boys	1968	1995	Merged into Simonds Catholic College
Champagnat College	Wangaratta	Catholic boys	1955	1983	Merged into Galen Catholic College
Chanel College	Geelong	Catholic boys	1958	1999	
Chavion College	Burwood	Catholic girls	1966	1979	Merged into Emmaus College
Christ the King College	Braybrook	Catholic girls	1954	1997	Merged into Caroline Chisholm College
Christian Brothers College	St Kilda	Catholic boys	1878	2020	Merged into St Mary's College
Clarendon Presbyterian Girls College	Ballarat	Presbyterian girls	1876	1974	Merged into Ballarat Clarendon College
Clyde School	Macedon	Independent girls	1910	1972	Became part of Geelong Grammar School, Site is now Braemar College
ERA School	Donvale	Alternative	1971	1987	Site is now part of Carey Baptist Grammar School
Essendon Grammar School	Essendon	Independent boys	1934	1977	Merged into Penleigh and Essendon Grammar School
Frayne College	Baranduda	Catholic	2005	2015	Now St Francis of Assisi primary school
Goold College	Geelong	Catholic girls	1899	1991	Merged into Saint Ignatius College, Geelong
Hamilton College	Hamilton	Presbyterian boys	1871	1962	Merged into Hamilton and Alexandra College
The Hermitage (Geelong Girls Grammar)	Geelong	Anglican girls	1906	1972	Became part of Geelong Grammar School
Holy Eucharist Primary School	East Malvern	Catholic	1930	2017	Site is now part of De La Salle College, Malvern
ICA Casey College	Narre Warren South	Independent	2007	2010	Site became Waverley Christian College
ICA Melton College	Caroline Springs	Independent		2010	Site became Southern Cross Grammar
Insight Education Centre for the Blind and Vision Impaired	Berwick	Special		2019	
Kilbride College	Albert Park	Catholic girls	1909	1977	
Kildara College	Malvern	Catholic girls	1917	1992	
Kildare College	Traralgon	Catholic girls	1958	1988	Now part of Lavalla Catholic College
Kilmaire College	Hawthorn	Catholic girls	1922	1994	
Kilmore International School (The Colmont School)	Kilmore	Non-denominational	1990	2022	Changed its name to The Colmont School shortly before closing
Kingswood College	Doncaster	Uniting	1985	1989	
Larmenier School	Hampton	Catholic		2016	Special school
Loreto College	Portland	Catholic girls	1885	1977	
Macedon Grammar School	Macedon		1979	2014	Site became Alice Miller School
Marianist College	Frankston	Catholic boys	1973	1979	Merged into John Paul College
Marist College	Bendigo	Catholic boys	1893	1983	Merged into Catherine McAuley College. A new Marist College opened in 2015.
Marist College	Preston	Catholic boys	1957	1998	Merged into Samaritan Catholic College, now closed
Maryknoll College	Hamilton	Catholic girls	1968	1977	Became part of Monivae College
Melbourne City School	Melbourne	Non-denominational	2010	2012	Linked to Eltham College (Victoria)
MLC Elsternwick/Cato College	Elsternwick	Methodist girls	1897	1989	Became part of Wesley College
Morongo Girls' College	Geelong	Presbyterian girls	1920	1994	
Mother of God Primary School	Ivanhoe East	Catholic	1963	2017	
Mount Carmel College	Middle Park	Catholic boys	1917	1973	
Mount Carmel College	Rutherglen	Catholic girls	1901	1989	
Mountain District Christian School	Monbulk	Co-ed	1979	2022	
Mowbray College	Kurunjang and Caroline Springs		1983	2012	Kurunjang site is now Heathdale Christian College
The New Generation College	Melbourne	No religious affiliation	2004	2015	
Northcote Farm School	Glenmore		1937	1970s	
O’Neil College	Elsternwick	Catholic girls	1908	1988	Became part of Star of the Sea College
Orminston House	Mont Albert	Independent girls	1848	1964	Became part of Camberwell Girls Grammar School
Our Lady of Sion College	Sale	Catholic girls	1890	1977	Merged into Catholic College Sale
Our Lady of Sion College	Warragul	Catholic girls	1905	1975	Merged into Marist-Sion College
Penbank School	Moorooduc	Non-denominational	1974	2015	Now part of Woodleigh School
Penleigh Ladies College	Essendon	Presbyterian girls	1871	1977	Merged into Penleigh and Essendon Grammar School
Presentation College	Moe	Catholic	1951	2001	Now part of Lavalla Catholic College
Presentation College, Windsor	Windsor	Catholic girls	1873	2020	Merged into St Mary's College
Queens College/Ballarat Girls Grammar	Ballarat	Anglican girls	1877	1973	Became part of Ballarat Grammar School
Resurrection House	Essendon	Catholic	1952	2022	Became a campus of St Bernard's College
St Aloysius Primary School	Caulfield	Catholic	1920	2020	
St Ambrose's School	Brunswick	Catholic	1885	2008	
St Ann's College	Warrnambool	Catholic girls	1872	1991	Merged into Emmanuel College, Warrnambool
St Anne's School	Sale	Anglican girls	1924	1971	Became part of Gippsland Grammar School
St Augustine's College	Yarraville	Catholic boys	1942	1972	
St Augustine's Girls School	Yarraville	Catholic girls	1941	1991	
St Benedict's Primary School	Burwood	Catholic	1941	2020	
St Colman's College	Shepparton	Catholic boys	1951	1984	Merged into Notre Dame College
St Francis Xavier's College	St Arnaud	Catholic	1904	1976	
St Gabriel's College	Castlemaine	Catholic	1906	1974	
St George's School	Carlton	Catholic	1856	1985	
St James College	East Bentleigh	Catholic boys	1970	2020	Became part of St Bede's College
St John's College	Braybrook	Catholic boys	1965	1997	Merged into Caroline Chisholm College
St John's Lutheran School	Geelong	Lutheran	1962		became part of Geelong Lutheran College
St John's Marist College	Hawthorn	Catholic boys	1925	1976	
St Joseph's College	Colac	Catholic girls	1888	1983	Now part of Trinity College
St Joseph's College	Kilmore	Catholic girls	1875	1986	
St Joseph's College	North Melbourne and Pascoe Vale	Catholic boys	1903	2010	
St Joseph's College	North Fitzroy	Catholic boys	1930	1998	Merged into Samaritan Catholic College, now closed
St Joseph's College	Wangaratta	Catholic girls	1887	1983	Merged into Galen Catholic College
St Joseph's College	Warrnambool	Catholic boys	1902	1991	Merged into Emmanuel College, Warrnambool
St Joseph's College	Warragul	Catholic boys	1951	1975	Merged into Marist-Sion College
St Joseph's Technical School	Abbotsford	Catholic boys	1893	1990	
St Joseph's Technical School	South Melbourne	Catholic boys	1905	1990	
St Kevin's School	Ormond	Catholic	1924	2020	
St Leo's College	Box Hill	Catholic boys	1957	1994	
St Martin's in the Pines	Ballarat	Catholic	1967	1995	Merged into Damascus College Ballarat
St Mary's/St Angela's College	Dandenong	Catholic girls	1966	1974	Now part of St John's Regional College
St Mary's College	Bendigo	Catholic girls	1876	1983	Merged into Catherine McAuley College.
St Mary's School	West Melbourne	Catholic	1855	1996	Merged into Simonds Catholic College
St Mary's Technical School	Geelong	Catholic boys	1916	1991	Merged into Saint Ignatius College, Geelong
St Michael's School	Springbank	Catholic	1870	2016	
St Patrick's College	East Melbourne	Catholic boys	1854	1968	
St Patrick's College	Sale	Catholic boys	1922	1977	Merged into Catholic College Sale
St Paul's College	Ballarat	Catholic boys	1948	1995	Merged into Damascus College Ballarat
St Paul's College	Traralgon	Catholic boys	1956	1979	Now part of Lavalla Catholic College
St Thomas College	Clifton Hill	Catholic boys	1916	1981	
St Thomas More College	Vermont	Catholic boys	1967	1979	Merged into Emmaus College
St Vincent's College	Bendigo	Catholic boys	1955	1978	Now part of Catherine McAuley College.
St Vincent's School	Maidstone	Catholic			Special School
Sacred Heart College	Ballarat	Catholic girls	1881	1995	Merged into Damascus College Ballarat
Sacred Heart College	Mansfield	Catholic girls	1892	1972	
Sacred Heart College	Shepparton	Catholic girls	1901	1984	Merged into Notre Dame College
Samaritan Catholic College	Fitzroy North and Preston	Catholic boys	2000	2009	
Sancta Sopia College	Glenroy	Catholic	1967	1995	Merged into Penola Catholic College
Shelford Girls' Grammar	Caulfield	Anglican girls	1898	2024	Became a campus of Caulfield Grammar School
South Melbourne College			1883	1917	
Stella Maris FCJ College	Frankston	Catholic girls	1968	1979	Merged into John Paul College
Stratherne Presbyterian Girls School	Hawthorn	Presbyterian girls	1889	1968	
Therry College	Broadmedows	Catholic boys	1969	1994	Merged into Penola Catholic College
Trinity Regional College	Brunswick	Catholic	1967	2002	
Vaucluse College	Richmond	Catholic girls	1882	2000	
Westleigh College	Northcote	Independent girls	1900	1962	
