= Associated Catholic Colleges =

Group of Catholic boys' schools

- Abbreviation: ACC
- Formation: 1911; 115 years ago
- Headquarters: The Provence Centre; Mulgrave, Victoria
- Location: Melbourne, Victoria
- Members: 13 member schools (>15,700 students collectively)
- Official language: English
- Executive Officer: Paul Fahey
- Website: www.accvic.au

The Associated Catholic Colleges (ACC) is a group of thirteen independent Catholic boys schools in Victoria, Australia. The Association, formed in 1911, and renamed in 1948, provides the basis for interschool sporting and other competitions between member schools.

== History ==
Christian Brothers College (now known as St Mary's College) was one of eighteen schools to participate in the first Combined Secondary Schools Athletics Championship conducted by the Victorian Amateur Athletic Association (VAAA) on 7 November 1902 at the Melbourne Cricket Ground. The Adamson Cup, donated by the headmaster of Wesley College and president of the VAAA, was presented to the winning school. Christian Brothers College East Melbourne (now known as Parade College) was the only Catholic College to ever win the cup in 1910.

The history of sporting competition between Catholic Secondary Schools in Melbourne and Victoria, goes back to 1911, when the Secondary Schools' Championship Meeting was first conducted by the School Amateur Athletic Association of Victoria on 3 November at the East Melbourne Cricket Ground. The colleges that competed in this first competition were the Christian Brothers Colleges of East Melbourne, St Kilda, North Melbourne, South Melbourne, St Patrick's College, Ballarat and Assumption College, Kilmore. This group later became 'The Combined Catholic Schools Association'. The Association was also known as the Associated Catholic Secondary Schools prior to it becoming the Associated Catholic Colleges in 1948. Member colleges took part in an annual athletics meeting, football, handball and tennis competitions. As the competition expanded additional Catholic secondary colleges conducted by other male religious orders such as the De La Salle Brothers, Marist Brothers and others also participated in the competition which included cricket by 1928.

The first swimming carnival for the Associated Catholic Secondary Schools of Victoria was held on 2 March 1932 at the Kew City Baths, with Christian Brothers Colleges of East Melbourne, North Melbourne and St Kilda and De La Salle competing.

In 1940, the Athletics competition was divided into two divisions due to the number of participating colleges. Division 1: CBC Parade, CBC St Kilda, St Joseph's North Melbourne, De La Salle, St Patrick's Ballarat, St Patrick's Sale and Assumption. Division 2: St Kevin's, St. Bede's, St Monica's Essendon, St Joseph's Geelong and St Patrick's East Melbourne.

In 1951, member colleges were divided into the metropolitan (CBC North Melbourne, CBC Parade, CBC St Kilda, De La Salle, St Bede's, St Bernard's and St Kevin's) and country (Assumption, CBC Warrnambool, Marcellin Mt Gambier, Marcellin Camberwell, Marist Bendigo, St Joseph's Geelong, St Patrick's Ballarat and St Patrick's Sale) groups to compete in the athletics championship. The Archbishop's Shield for the Division 1 Athletics Champions was awarded to the new Associated Catholic Country Colleges aggregate winners, and the newly donated Old Collegians Shield was awarded for the city colleges aggregate winners. The final Associated Catholic Country Colleges Athletics carnival was held in 1975.

== Aims ==
1. The Association endeavours to promote the essential character of its member colleges by mutual :solidarity and support.

2. The Association aims to provide the opportunity for discussion by Principals of matters affecting :the affiliated Colleges and to suggest, wherever desirable, a policy on such matters.

3. The Association exists to facilitate the organisation of inter-College activities and competitions :which accord with the principles and ideals of the member Colleges.

== Schools ==
=== Current member schools ===
School	Location	Principal	Enrolment	Founded	Affiliation	Gender	Year Entered Competition	School Colours
De La Salle College	Malvern	Peter Houlihan	890	1912	Lasallian	Boys	1920	Blue and gold
Emmanuel College	Altona North, Point Cook	Dr Janine Biggin	783 (Boys at Altona North)	1965	Marianist	Co-educational	1978	Red and sky blue
Mazenod College	Mulgrave	Dr Paul Shannon	1,469	1967	OMI	Boys	1999	Black, white and blue
Parade College	Bundoora, Preston	Mark Aiello	1,959	1871	Christian Brothers	Boys	1911	Purple, green and navy
Salesian College	Chadstone	Mark Ashmore	982	1957	Salesian	Boys	1966–1983 re-entered, 1999	Navy, red and grey
Simonds Catholic College	West Melbourne	Robert Anastasio	359	1996		Boys	2000	Navy, maroon and gold
St. Bede's College	Mentone	Deborah Frizza	1,882	1938	Lasallian	Boys	1940	Blue, red and gold
St. Bernard's College	Essendon West, Aberfeldie	Dr Michael Davies	1,567	1940	Christian Brothers	Boys	1940	Black, blue and gold
St. Joseph's College	Ferntree Gully	Catherine Livingstone	991	1965	Salesian	Boys	2017	Navy and yellow
St. Joseph's College	Newtown, Geelong	Tony Paatsch	1,742	1935	Christian Brothers	Boys	1935–1975 re-entered, 1997	Black, gold and red
St. Mary's College	St Kilda East	Darren Atkinson	307 (Boys)	1878	Christian Brothers	Co-educational	1911	Navy, sky blue and bottle green
St Patrick's College	Ballarat	Steven O'Connor	1,267	1893	Christian Brothers	Boys	1911–1975, re-entered 2022	Green, white and navy
Whitefriars College	Donvale	Mark Murphy	1,055	1961	Carmelite	Boys	1999	Brown, gold and navy

=== Former member schools ===
School	Location	Founded	Years Competed	School Colors
Assumption College	Kilmore	1893	1911–1975^	Royal blue, sky blue and gold
Cathedral College	East Melbourne	1968–1994	1988–1994	Black and gold
Chisholm College; Now part of Caroline Chisholm Catholic College	Braybrook	1979–1996	1979–1987	
Champagnat College; Now part of Galen Catholic College	Wangaratta	1955–1973	1961^–1973	
Christian Brothers' College later St Joseph's Christian Brothers' Technical College	South Melbourne	1905–1988	1911–1931	
Marcellin College	Bulleen	1952	1952–1963	Maroon, sky blue and gold
Marist College; Now part of Red Bend Catholic College	Forbes	1926–1976	1966^–1975	
Marist College; Now part of Tenison Woods College	Mt Gambier	1931–1971	1951^–1955	
Mentone College on the site of St Bede's College	Mentone	1896–1920	1912	
Monivae College	Hamilton	1954	1971^–1975	
Mount Carmel College	Middle Park	1918–1970s	1927–1931	
Salesian College	Sunbury	1927	1958^–1975	
Samaritan College; Now part of Parade College	Preston	2000–2008	2000–2008	Purple and gold
St Colman's College; Now part of Notre Dame College	Shepparton	1951–1983	1961^–1975	
St John's College; Now part of Caroline Chisholm Catholic College	Braybrook	1965–1996	1971–1996	
St Joseph's College; Formerly known as Marist Brothers College, Brunswick East; Became part of Samaritan College	Fitzroy North	1930–1999	1958–1978	
St Joseph's College; Formerly known as Christian Brothers and later St Joseph's College, North Melbourne (1903–2010) and St Joseph's College, Pascoe Vale (1956–2009)	North Melbourne	1903–2010	1911–2010	Purple and white
St Joseph's College; Formerly known as Christian Brothers and later St Joseph's CBC; Became part of Emmanuel College	Warrnambool	1902–1990	1951–1968^	
St Kevin's College	Toorak	1918	1940–1957	Green, gold and navy
St Mary's Technical College; Also known as CBC Geelong; Amalgamated with Goold College in 1990 to form Catholic Regional College; Became part of St Ignatius College	Geelong	1919–1934	1919–1934	
St Monica's CBC	Essendon	1918	1919–1931	
St Patrick's College; Formerly known as Christian Brothers College; Became part of Catholic College Sale	Sale	1922–1976	1922–1975^	
St Patrick's College	East Melbourne	1854–1968	1928–1948	
St Paul's College; Now part of Lavalla Catholic College	Traralgon	1956–1978	1963^–1975	
St Vincent's College, Bendigo; Now part of Catherine McAuley College	Bendigo	1893–1982	1958^–1975	
Trinity College; Now part of Antonine College	Brunswick	1967–2001	2000–2001	
University College	Armadale	1895–1929	1913	

^Country Colleges competition

=== Possible future member school ===
School	Location	Enrolment	Founded	Affiliation	Year Entering Competition	School Colours
Marcellin College	Bulleen	1,173	1950	Marist Brothers	Unknown (1952–1963)	Maroon, sky blue and gold

== Sports ==
=== Current ===
- Athletics
- Swimming
- Cross Country
- Basketball
- Cricket
- Football
- Golf
- Hockey
- Soccer
- Table Tennis
- Tennis
- Volleyball
- Debating
- Chess
- Badminton
- Bowls (Lawn)

=== Former ===
- Handball

== Trophies awarded ==
=== Athletics ===
The aggregate division 1 winners are presented the Old Collegians Shield.

=== Swimming ===
The aggregate division 1 winners are presented with the Walsh Shield (donated by P S Walsh).

=== Cross Country ===
The aggregate division 1 senior winners are presented with the Brother Bouchard Cup. Joe Bouchard was the founding Principal of Chisholm College, and member of the ACC from 1970 to 1987.

The aggregate division 1 intermediate winners are presented with the Martin Hickey Cup. Martin Hickey was a member of the Parade College staff for over 25 years and Hon. Secretary of the ACC for 10 years.

The aggregate division 1 junior winners are presented with the James Delahunt Cup. The cup was donated by the Ryan Family in memory of James Delahunt, a Year 7 student at De La Salle College who was killed in an accident in 1981. James was an outstanding athlete who won the U/13 ACC Cross-Country.

== Carnivals ==
Students are given the opportunity to participate in a number of carnivals thought the year including Athletics at Lakeside Stadium, Cross Country, and Swimming at Melbourne Sports and Aquatic Centre.

== Academic events ==
Students can also become involved in events conducted off the field such as Chess, Debating and the Performing Arts.

== See also ==
- List of schools in Victoria
