= Andrew Johnston (footballer) =

Australian rules footballer and coach (born 1970)

Personal information
- Full name: Andrew Johnston
- Born: 14 August 1970 (age 56); Melbourne, Australia
- Original team: St. Bernards
- Draft: 29th, 1990 Pre-Season Draft
- Height: 179 cm (5 ft 10 in)
- Weight: 75 kg (165 lb)
- Position: Rover/Center

Playing career^{1}
Years	Club	Games (Goals)
1990–1991	Fitzroy	9 (3)
- ^{1} Playing statistics correct to the end of 1991.

Andrew Johnston (born 14 August 1970) is a former Australian rules footballer who played with Fitzroy in the Australian Football League (AFL). He was a Development Coach at the Gold Coast Football Club. He was the coach in the TAC Cup for Calder Cannon under 18 for 3 years ( 15 - 17 ). Johnston coached at St. Bernards football club in the VAFA as an assistant for a brief period of time before departing from the club at the end of 2019.

Originally from St. Bernards, Johnston played under-19s and reserves football with Essendon, prior to joining Fitzroy via the 1990 Pre-Season Draft. He played six senior games in 1990 and a further three in 1991.
