= Leibler Yavneh College =

Location
- Elsternwick, Melbourne, Victoria; Australia; 37°53′34″S 145°00′24″E

Information
- Type: private comprehensive co-educational primary and secondary Jewish day school
- Motto: Hebrew: תורה ועבודה, romanized: Torah V'Avodah (Torah and Work)
- Religious affiliation: Modern Orthodoxy
- Denomination: Jewish
- Established: 1962; 64 years ago
- Principal: Shula Lazar
- Years: C–12
- Enrollment: c. 700
- Colours: Yellow and blue
- Website: www.yavneh.vic.edu.au

Leibler Yavneh College is a private, Modern Orthodox Jewish comprehensive co-educational primary and secondary day school, located in the Melbourne suburb of Elsternwick, Victoria, Australia. The school has students enrolled from Preschool to Year 12. As of 2025, the principal is Shula Lazar.

== History ==
In 1962, Leibler Yavneh College was established with 53 students.

In 1979, the school was expanded when a secondary school, named Yavneh A. S. Leibler Secondary College, was opened in Melbourne.

In 2017, the Chief Rabbi of Israel, David Lau, addressed the students as part of his Australia tour.

In 2023, after about 10 students from Leibler Yavneh College boarded a public bus in Melbourne, a man who called himself a Nazi brandished a six-inch serrated knife. After the students quickly exited the bus, the man pursued them for a short distance before fleeing the scene.

== Curriculum ==
In addition to standard General Studies topics (English, Humanities and Social Sciences, Geography, Business Studies, Mathematics, Science, Arts, Wellbeing, Health and Physical Education), the Leibler Yavneh curriculum includes studies in Hebrew, Tanach, Gemara, and Halacha. This curriculum allows all students in years 11 and 12 to achieve the Victorian Certificate of Education (VCE) and obtain an Australian Tertiary Admission Rank (ATAR) score, enabling them to enrol in University. In 2024, the VCE scores of Leibler Yavneh ranked 23rd among Victorian secondary schools.

== Community service ==
As a commitment to social justice, Leibler Yavneh students learn the core principles of Avodah (work), Tzedakah (righteousness/charity), and Gemilut Chasadim (acts of kindness). In Years 7–10, students have community service as a compulsory extracurricular activity, in the form of a minimum of 20 hours per year to a range of organisations or individuals. Some take part in cross-age tutoring (working with younger children to assist teachers in class), while others are involved in fundraisers or visit the elderly on a regular basis. The activities are varied, and students have an opportunity to give their own time to causes that are linked to their communal, civic, and personal responsibilities. As the concept of giving becomes part of their lives, most students continue their community service in Years 11 and 12 and beyond, on a voluntary basis.

== See also ==
- List of non-government schools in Victoria
- Judaism in Australia
