= Sholem Aleichem College =

Location
- 11 Sinclair Street, Elsternwick, Victoria; Australia
- Coordinates: 37°52′57″S 145°00′05″E

Information
- Type: Independent comprehensive co-educational early learning and primary Jewish day school
- Motto: Values for a Lifetime
- Denomination: Jewish
- Established: 1947; 79 years ago
- Principal: Reyzl Zylberman
- Years: Early learning and K–6
- Enrolment: 250
- Colours: Blue, red, yellow
- Website: www.sholem.vic.edu.au

Sholem Aleichem College is an Independent Jewish co-educational early learning and primary day school located in the Melbourne suburb of Elsternwick, Victoria, Australia. Established in 1947, the school caters to the religious and general education needs of approximately 300 students, ranging from early learning, to Kindergarten and through to Year 6.

== Overview ==
Established in 1947 by the Bundist movement as a Sunday school that taught Yiddish and Jewish studies, the current day school opened its doors to ten Prep children in 1975. Sholem's approach to Judaism is secular and inclusive, it celebrates all the Jewish festivals with cultural traditions, music and food.

Sholem Aleichem College is one of the very few secular Jewish schools in the world that teach Yiddish.

== History ==
In 1935, the Melbourne IL Peretz Sunday School, and later in 1947 its sister Sunday school, Sholem Aleichem, were established. They taught Yiddish and Jewish Studies. These Yiddish schools were inspired by the forward thinking Tsisho schools of Eastern Europe.

Sholem Aleichem (pen-name) is the namesake of the school. He was born Sholom Rabinowitz in Ukraine in 1859. Sholem Aleichem was a renowned Yiddish writer of stories, novels and plays, and a humourist. He died in New York, USA, in 1916 where it is estimated that 100,000 attended his funeral.

== Academics ==
Sholem Aleichem College is ranked using the NAPLAN system. In January 2016, the school was the 8th ranked Primary School in Victoria and was the highest ranked Jewish Primary School. Between 60% and 90% of Sholem students have been in the top quarter of NAPLAN results every year since 2011.

== Performing arts ==
Sholem Aleichem College has a well developed visual and performing Arts Program.

A highlight of the Sholem school calendar is the school musical, in which every single student participates. Senior students also have the opportunity to become filmmakers, with a very unusual program that sees specialist film director Mike Feurstein visit the school from the United States to tutor the students through the process of making a short film.

Of particular interest is the instrumental music program. Every student in Years 3–6 has the opportunity to learn an instrument of their choice (from flute, clarinet, violin, cello and percussion), for free. This program has enabled Sholem to form ensembles / orchestras at each Year level. The students perform regularly at school and extensively within the Jewish and wider community.

== House system ==
The four houses, Molodovsky (green), Peretz (yellow), Reyzen (red) and Leyb (blue) are mainly used for interhouse activities such as sporting events and community involvement and are named for Yiddish writers and poets – Kadya Molodowsky, Mani Leyb, Avrom Reyzen, I.L. Peretz.

== Notable alumni ==
- Yvette Coppersmith – artist, Archibald Prize winner (2018), finalist (2017, 2016, 2009, 2008)
- Husky Gawenda – award-winning singer-songwriter and principal writer, lead singer and guitarist of the band Hsuky (Triple J Unearthed winners, APRA award winner)
- Michael Gawenda – multi-award-winning journalist and editor of The Age from 1997 to 2004

== See also ==
- List of non-government schools in Victoria
- Judaism in Australia
