= St Mary's College, Melbourne (school) =

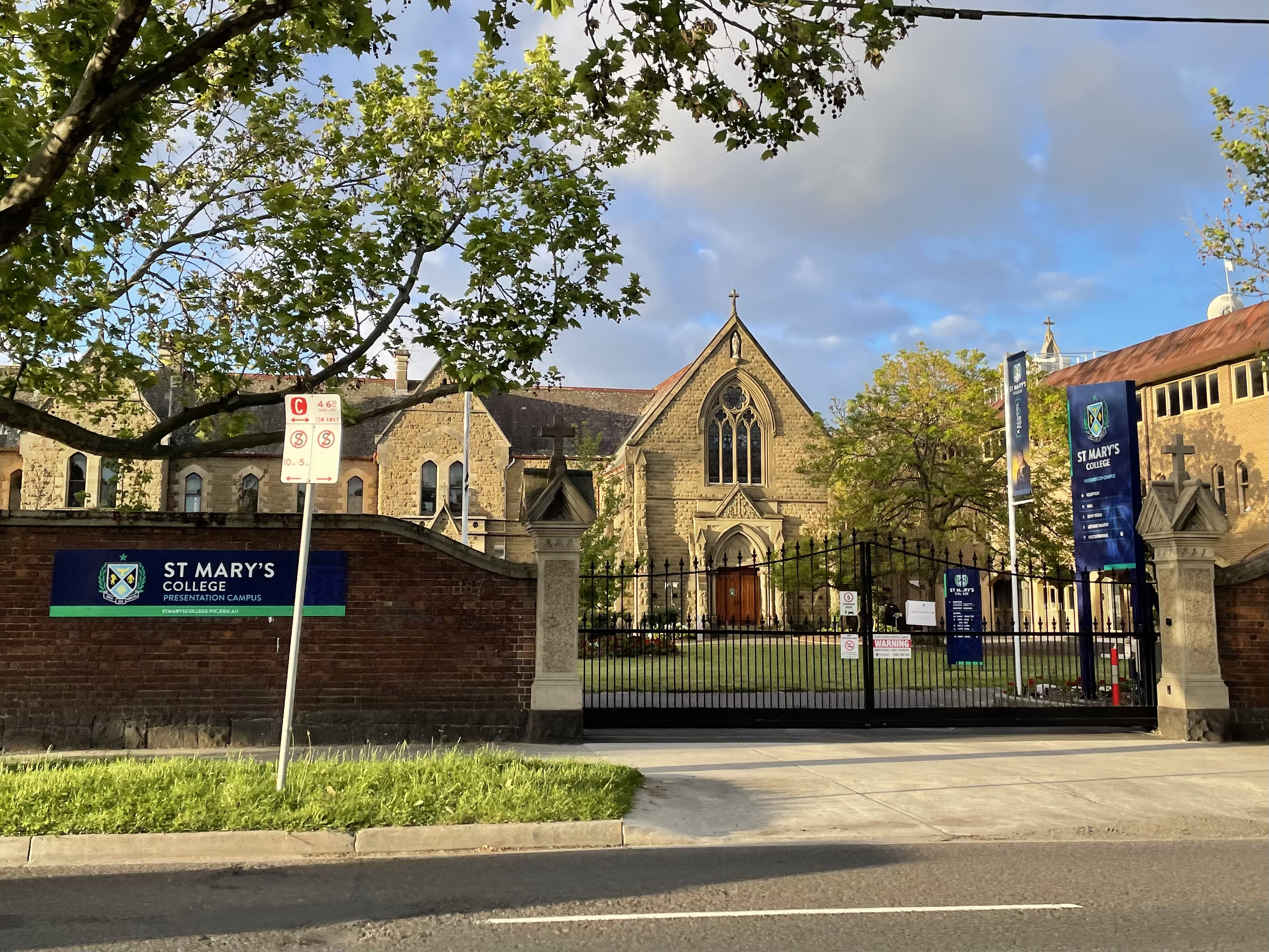
- Main entrance of the former Presentation Campus

Location
- 11 Westbury Street, St Kilda East, Victoria, Australia; 37°51′33″S 144°59′48″E

Information
- Former names: Christian Brothers College, St Kilda; Presentation College Windsor
- Type: Independent secondary school
- Motto: Latin: Virtus Sola Nobilitas (Virtue Alone Is Noble)
- Religious affiliation: Roman Catholic
- Denomination: Christian Brothers
- Patron saints: Blessed Edmund Rice, St Mary
- Established: 26 July 1878; 148 years ago
- Trust: Edmund Rice Education Australia
- Chair: John Sinisgalli
- Principal: Darren Atkinson
- Deputy Principal: Fiona Mulhall
- Director of Students: Jen Howard
- Chaplain: Fr Jerome Santamaria
- Years offered: 7–12
- Gender: Co-educational
- Enrolment: 552
- Campus: Edmund Rice Campus
- Campus type: Inner-city
- Houses: Corbett; McMahon; O'Shea; Tevlin
- Colours: Navy blue, light blue, green
- Slogan: A School For All
- Yearbook: Loquax Ludi
- Affiliation: Associated Catholic Colleges; Catholic Girls Sports Association of Victoria
- Website: stmaryscollege.vic.edu.au

St Mary's College (formerly Christian Brothers College, St Kilda, Presentation College, Windsor) is an independent Catholic co-educational secondary college, located in Melbourne, Victoria, Australia. The school was founded in 1878 and is both one of the oldest private schools in Melbourne and one of the only co-educational Catholic schools in inner Melbourne.

Originally founded as Christian Brothers College, St Kilda (CBC St Kilda), and run by the Christian Brothers, the school has long since had a lay teaching and administrative staff; becoming co-educational as St Mary's College in 2021 following the closure of Presentation College Windsor (PCW).

The college is governed by Edmund Rice Education Australia and is also members of Associated Catholic Colleges and Catholic Girls Sports Association of Victoria.

== History ==
St Mary's College was founded as Christian Brothers College St Kilda, a Catholic single-sex boys school in 1878. Its former sister school, Presentation College Windsor, was founded in 1873 as a Catholic single-sex girls school.

=== Founding & single-sex education ===
In 1872, the parish priest of St Mary's Parish, Dr James Corbett wrote to the Presentation Sisters and Christian Brothers, calling for their assistance in providing Catholic education in the precinct, following the passing of the Educational Act of 1872 and the establishment of a nearby state school.

The Presentation Sisters arrived in 1873, founding Presentation Convent Windsor (later Presentation College Windsor) and running the pre-existing St Mary's Primary School.

The Christian Brothers arrived in 1878, founding Christian Brothers College St Kilda as well as the former St Mary's Boys School; a single-sex primary school located directly west to the CBC site, which ran until 1986 and is now operated by the co-educational St Mary's Primary School East St Kilda for its Specialist Campus. A plaque commemorating the boys school is located on the building.

Both colleges operated as separate single-sex schools for nearly 150 years, with VCE classes being shared between both colleges since 1991.

CBC was governed and operated by the Christian Brothers until the first lay principal being Mr Gerald Bain-King in 2005, and the college ceding its governance in 2007 to Edmund Rice Education Australia, an organisation that governs schools previously administered by the Christian Brothers in Australia at the time and continues to govern St Mary's College.

PCW was governed by the Presentation Sisters until their closure.

=== Co-education ===
In 2019, following the announcement of Presentation College Windsor's closure at the end of 2020, CBC St Kilda announced it would reregister from a single-sex boys school to a co-educational school that would operate across both sites.

On 23 November 2020, CBC St Kilda announced the change of name to St Mary's College Melbourne, beginning operation as a Catholic co-educational college in 2021.

On 2 October 2023, the college announced that the lease on Presentation Campus (owned by the Presentation Sisters) will be terminated in September 2024 to allow more funding to be dedicated to capital works on the Edmund Rice Campus without having to raise tuition fees. These capital works were constructed from November 2023, and up to the closure of Presentation Campus in September 2024.

== Curriculum ==
St Mary's College offers its senior (years 10–12) students the following pathways:

- Scored Victorian Certificate of Education (VCE)
- Unscored Victorian Certificate of Education*
- VCE Vocational Major*
- VET, via external providers.†
- Victorian Pathways Certificate

* Does not allow for study scores or an ATAR to be calculated.

† Can be completed alongside Scored/Unscored VCE, and must be completed with the VCE VM program.

VCE results 2012–2023
Year	Rank	Median study score	Scores of 40+ (%)	Cohort size
2012	195	30	5.3	101
2013	305	28	4.1	91
2014	179	30	7.2	91
2015	236	29	5.5	119
2016	268	29	2.6	106
2017	190	30	5.1	87
2018	147	31	6.7	108
2019	234	29	5.2	116
2020	241	29	4.7	91
2021	265	29	3.6	130
2022	206	30	4.4	137
2023	150	31	6.4	117

== Campuses ==
St Mary's College has one campus, the Edmund Rice Campus. Formerly, the college also utilised the old site of Presentation College Windsor as a campus for students in years 9, 11, and 12.

=== Edmund Rice Campus ===
Located on 11 Westbury Street, St Kilda East as the original site of CBC St Kilda, the Edmund Rice Campus is the home-campus for all year levels.

The site was originally established by the Christian Brothers in 1878.

=== Presentation Campus ===
Located on 187 Dandenong Road, Windsor as the original site of Presentation College Windsor, the Presentation Campus was the home-campus for Years 9, 11 and 12.

The Year 9 Nobilitas Program was operated on this campus in the Rahilly Centre.

The site was originally founded by the Presentation Sisters in 1873.

Presentation Campus closed on September 20, 2024.

== Houses ==
The St Mary's College houses were established in 1955 in honour of previous principals of CBC St Kilda.

Houses	Colour	In Honour Of	Motto
Corbett		Br J. P. Corbett Principal 1878–1881	Latin: Macte Virtutem (Strive with virtue)
McMahon		Br R. A. McMahon Principal 1930–1936	Latin: Ad magorem Dei gloriam (Do all things for God's greater glory)
O'Shea		Br J. C. O'Shea Principal 1887–1902	Latin: Quem timebo (Whom shall I fear)
Tevlin		Br J. S. Tevlin Principal 1909–1919	Latin: In oruce glorior (I will glory in the cross)

== Sport ==
St Mary's College is a founding member of the Associated Catholic Colleges (ACC) and a member the Catholic Girls Sports Association of Victoria (CGSAV).

=== ACC premierships ===
St Mary's College has won the following ACC premierships.

- Athletics (16) – 1918, 1919, 1920, 1923, 1927, 1935, 1942, 1950, 1951, 1952, 1953, 1954, 1957, 1960, 1968, 1971
- Basketball (1) – 2014
- Chess Division 1 (1) – 1998
- Chess Division 2 (2) – 2007, 2018
- Cricket Seniors 1st XI (12) – 1932, 1933, 1935, 1936, 1937, 1940, 1941, 1942, 1944, 1948, 1967, 1974
- Cricket T20 Division 2 (3) – 2020, 2021, 2023
- Cross Country Division 1 (2) – 1974, 1975
- Cross Country Division 2 (13) – 1999, 2000, 2001, 2002, 2003, 2004, 2005, 2006, 2007, 2008, 2009, 2010, 2016
- Debating Junior Division 2 (3) – 2002, 2007, 2022
- Football (AFL) Division 1 (14) – 1933, 1934, 1936, 1937, 1941, 1949, 1951, 1952, 1956, 1958, 1959, 1963, 1969, 1971
- Football (AFL) Division 2 (5) – 1992, 2014, 2015, 2016, 2021
- Golf Open Division 2 (8) – 2000, 2001, 2002, 2003, 2004, 2005, 2009, 2021
- Handball (1) – 1953
- Hockey (3) – 1982, 2007, 2011
- Soccer Seniors Division 1 (4) – 1978, 1987, 1997, 2007
- Soccer Seniors Division 2 (2) – 2019, 2021
- Swimming (23) – 1932, 1933, 1934, 1935, 1944, 1945, 1946, 1947, 1948, 1949, 1950, 1951, 1954, 1955, 1959, 1960, 1961, 1968, 1969, 1970, 1971, 1972, 1977
- Tennis (5) – 1939, 1940, 1941, 1945, 2023
- Triathlon (2) – 2018, 2022

== Notable alumni ==
The arts, media and entertainment

- John Burns – radio presenter
- Peter Corrigan – architect
- Frank Howson – scriptwriter and film director
- Richard Hughes CBE – journalist, foreign correspondent in Asia
- Daniel Keene – playwright
- Charles Buttrose – journalist, media executive, and father of Ita Buttrose (see: https://adb.anu.edu.au/biography/buttrose-charles-oswald-george-20459
- Eddie McGuire AM – television personality, former CEO of the Nine Network
- Bob Maguire AM RFD – priest, community worker and media personality
- Felix Mallard – actor and musician
- Barry Oakley – writer and former literary editor of The Australian newspaper
- Daryl Somers OAM – television personality
- Kevin Summers – actor, playwright
- Gerard Vaughan – director of the National Gallery of Australia
- Morris West AO – writer
- John Lyons - Americas Editor of the ABC and former editor of the Sydney Morning Herald

Business

- Paul Gardner AM – former chairman of Grey Global, chairman of the Melbourne Football Club
- Robert James Thomson – editor-in-chief of Dow Jones & Company and the managing editor of The Wall Street Journal, and former editor of The Times
- Antanas Guoga - cryto-multi millionaire, poker player and former Member of the European Parliament 2014-2019

Government, law and military

- James Reginald Halligan OBE – senior public servant
- Richard Keane – prominent trade unionist and trade minister in the Chifley Labor government
- Tony Lupton – cabinet secretary, Brumby Labor government, Victoria, 2002–2014
- John Madigan – senator representing Victoria (2011–2016) and deputy leader of the DLP
- Frank McGuire – Labor Party Member of the Victorian Legislative Assembly for Broadmeadows (2011–present)
- Frank Meere – senior public servant

Sport

- Douglas Bachli MBE, golfer, Member of the Sports Australia Hall of Fame: https://adb.anu.edu.au/biography/bachli-douglas-william-doug-34664
- Atu Bosenavulagi – Australian rules footballer for Collingwood
- Frank Dunin - Australian Rules footballer for Richmond
- Geoff Feehan - Australian Rules footballer for St Kilda
- Simon Meehan – Australian rules footballer for St Kilda
- Kevin Mithen - Australian rules footballer for Melbourne
- Laurie Mithen - Australian Rules footballer for Melbourne
- Patrick John O'Dea – Australian rules footballer turned American football player
- Kevin O'Donnell – Australian rules footballer, father of Simon O'Donnell
- Don Williams - Australian Rules footballer for Melbourne.
- Josh Worrell- AFL player
