= Waverley Christian College =

Christian school in Victoria, Australia

Location
- 1248 High Street Road, Wantirna South & 20 College Drive, Narre Warren South; Wantirna South & Narre Warren South, Victoria; Australia; 37°52′49″S 145°12′52″E

Information
- Type: Christian independent & co-educational
- Motto: In Hoc Vinces; In This We Conquer
- Established: 1978 as Parkmore Full Gospel College
- Principal: Rod Ramsay
- Grades: K–12
- Gender: Co-educational
- Enrollment: 2305
- Campuses: Wantirna South & Narre Warren South
- Colours: Blue & gold
- School fees: VCE $12,280 per year plus fees
- Affiliations: Independent School Victoria; Christian Schools Australia; CityLife Church
- Website: www.wcc.vic.edu.au

Waverley Christian College is a co-educational independent Christian school with two campuses – Wantirna South and Narre Warren South, Victoria, Australia. The college offers Christian education to pre-school, primary, and secondary students.

Originally established in 1978 as Parkmore Full Gospel College by Parkmore Full Gospel Church, the church and school merged with Waverley Christian Fellowship (now CityLife Church) in 1983. The college moved to its present site in Wantirna South in 1989.

== Houses ==
The college has a four-house system. Each student is placed in a house named in honour of Christians who made a significant contribution to the promotion of the Bible in Christian history. The house system conducts weekly student meetings and aims to encourage healthy competition, build team spirit and develop student leadership. Points are awarded in academic, sporting and spiritual areas of the college.

The four houses are:

House name	Colours	Named after
Wycliffe	Red	John Wycliffe, a 14th-century theologian
Tyndale	Green	William Tyndale, 16th-century Protestant reformer and scholar
Finney	Yellow	Charles Finney, an 18th-century American revivalist and minister
Spurgeon	Blue	Charles Spurgeon, a 19th-century preacher

== Narre Warren South campus ==
Narre Warren South campus was established in 2012. There were almost 700 students enrolled in 2018 from Prep to Year 12. Facilities include a library, arts and technology specialist classrooms, as well as science and computer laboratories. The Junior Primary Centre was refurbished for the beginning of the 2016 school year. Construction of a new multi purpose centre, incorporating a gymnasium and performing arts theatre, was completed in April 2016. A new Primary School building was completed at the beginning of the 2017 school year. A new Junior Secondary Building was completed in 2024

See also

- Maranatha Christian School
- Hillcrest Christian College
