= Victory Christian College =

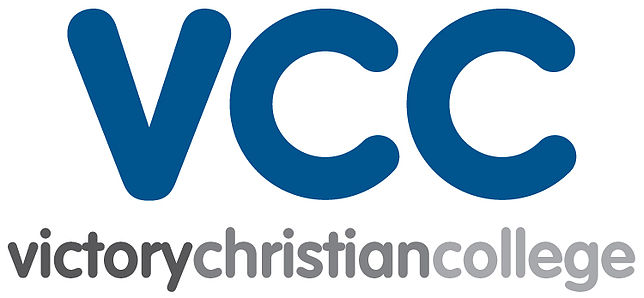

Location
- Bendigo, Victoria; Australia
- Coordinates: 36°46′58″S 144°18′47″E

Information
- Type: Independent, co-educational, Christian, day
- Denomination: Pentecostal
- Established: 1995
- Principal: Anne Marie Rodgers
- Employees: ~60
- Enrolment: ~700
- Colours: Blue and teal
- Slogan: Excellence, Leadership, Faith
- Website: www.vcc.vic.edu.au

Victory Christian College is an independent Christian Prep to Year 12 school located in south-east Bendigo, Victoria, Australia. The college is a member of Independent Schools Victoria and Christian Schools Australia.

== History ==
Victory Christian College was opened in 1995 as a ministry expression of Victory Church, an apostolic church in Bendigo. Different Christian denominations are represented in the staff and committee of management. In late 2009, the campus was relocated just over a kilometre down the road and expanded. The original site was redeveloped as a shopping centre.

== See also ==
- List of high schools in Victoria
- List of Non-Government Schools in Victoria, Australia
