= Gilson College =

Location
- 450 Taylors Road, Taylors Hill; 370 Bridge Inn Road, Mernda; Melbourne, Victoria; Australia; 37°43′27″S 144°45′47″E

Information
- Type: private co-educational early learning, primary and secondary day school
- Motto: Latin: Nihil Sine Deo (Nothing Without God)
- Denomination: Seventh-day Adventist
- Established: 1988
- Status: Open
- Principal: Raelene Delvin
- Deputy Principal: Leonard Farquharson
- Teaching staff: approx 105
- Years: Early learning; K–12
- Enrolment: c. 1,300 (2021)
- Campus: Taylors Hill; Mernda (Closed)
- Area: Taylors Hill: 10 ha (25 acres); Mernda: 13 ha (32 acres)
- Campus type: Suburban
- Colours: Navy blue and white
- Website: gilsoncollege.vic.edu.au

Gilson College is a Christian school located in the Melbourne suburbs of Mernda and Taylors Hill, Victoria, Australia. It is a private co-educational early learning, primary, and secondary day school. The school caters to students from early learning to Year 12. The original campus, located in Taylors Hill, was established in 1988. The second campus in Mernda was acquired by the school in December 2012 and classes began in January 2013. In January 2024 Gilson College in Mernda was renamed to Mernda Hills Christian College. The school is part of the Seventh-day Adventist education system, the world's second largest Christian school system.

== History ==
Gilson College traces its beginnings to the mid-1970s when a primary school was established in the suburb of Pascoe Vale in Melbourne’s northwest. At the end of 1987, the Pascoe Vale school was closed, and the Keilor School was established in 1988. In 1992, the school council voted to change the school's name from the Keilor School to Gilson College as a tribute to W.J. Gilson, a prominent figure in Adventist education in Australia. The growth of the Taylors Hill campus has seen the student enrolment go from around 50 students to now over 1,000.

In December 2012, a second campus for Gilson College was acquired from the former Acacia College. It caters to Foundation (Prep) through Year 12 (2019).

== Principals ==
The following individuals have served as College Principal:

Ordinal	Officeholder	Term start	Term end	Time in office	Notes
1	Lyndon Chapman	1988	1988	1 year	
2	Ron Hiscox	1989	1991	3 years	
3	Peter Baskin	1992	1994	3 years	
4	Chris Cowled	1995	1995	1 year	
5	Mark Vodell	1996	2022	26 years	
6	Raelene Delvin	2023	-	Current	

== Facilities ==
The Taylors Hill campus is set on 10 hectares (25 acres) of land near Caroline Springs, on the western outskirts of Melbourne. The College has in the past 18 years continued to expand its educational line-up, starting with the Science Wing, Library and E-block of classrooms completed in 2000, and later the IT block and Admin office completed in 2003. In more recent years, a six-classroom complex for Years Five and Six has been added to the campus. a building program has added facilities annually. Modern classrooms have been added or renovated. In addition to this, technology laboratories as well as new science facilities provide for the students' needs. A large gymnasium and an eco-science center are elements of the campus.

The Mernda Campus is set on 13 hectares (32 acres) of land in the northern suburbs of the city that consists of an Administration block, and a Junior School complex. The secondary complex is modern and consists of classrooms, science lab, food technology, visual communication room, industrial technology, art room, music and drama rooms. In 2017, work began on the refurbishment and completion of a new middle school facility for the secondary students with classes operating in 2018.

=== Site developments ===
The Taylors Hill campus has recently completed an expansion of the Year Three and Four complex which includes two additional classrooms, offices and the refurbishment of existing facilities. Future developments will include a Performing Arts Theatre and a Pre-school.

The Mernda campus has had a number of minor developments including a canteen, and recently a new middle / senior school complex with library has been opened. Future projects will include the development of the southern portion of the estate and the current secondary area being developed into a community center and kindergarten.

== Curriculum ==
In 1999, the school first started offering the Victorian Certificate of Education program on the Taylors Hill campus and now offers around 30 subjects. In the F–10 years, the College follows the Australian Curriculum for the eight learning areas which focuses on general capabilities and cross-curriculum priorities. In addition, the College utilises the Encounter program, which uses rigorous pedagogical practice and 21st century learning strategies as it explores and develops personal reasons for faith, lifestyle choices, and ethical decision-making from an Adventist worldview, all the while nurturing interpersonal relationships and service to others.

== See also ==
- List of Seventh-day Adventist secondary schools
- List of schools in Victoria
- Seventh-day Adventist education
