= St. Bernard's College, Melbourne =

St Bernard's College

Location
- 41 Rosehill Road; Northern; Essendon West, Victoria 3040; Australia; 37°45′1″S 144°52′56″E

Information
- Type: Independent secondary school
- Motto: Latin: Discere et Agere (To Learn and To Do)
- Religious affiliation: Catholicism
- Denomination: Christian Brothers
- Patron saint: Bernard of Clairvaux
- Established: 1940; 86 years ago
- Trust: Edmund Rice Education Australia
- Principal: Dr Michael Davies
- Years offered: 7–12
- Gender: Boys
- Enrolment: 1,600
- Average class size: 28
- Campuses: Essendon Campus (Years 7 & 8, 10-12): 41 Rosehill Road, Essendon West VIC 3040, Australia Resurrection House Campus (Year 9): 6 Aberfeldie Street, Aberfeldie VIC 3040, Australia Santa Monica Campus (Year 7 & 9 camp): 970 Great Ocean Road, Eastern View VIC 3231, Australia
- Houses: Avila (red), MacKillop (blue), McAuley (Yellow), Nagle (orange), Rice (green)
- Slogan: Achieving Excellence by Learning and Doing
- School fees: Year 7-8: $11,182, Year 9-12: $11,917
- Affiliation: Associated Catholic Colleges
- Website: www.sbc.vic.edu.au

St Bernard's College is an independent Catholic secondary school for boys, located in the Melbourne suburb of Essendon West, Victoria, Australia. The college is named after its patron saint, Bernard of Clairvaux, and is a member of the Associated Catholic Colleges. It is also part of Edmund Rice Education Australia, a series of schools that focus on teaching the pupils in the tradition of Edmund Rice. As of 2025, the school's principal is Michael Davies and the vice-principal is Therese Wilson.

== History ==
St Bernard's College traces its origins to the establishment of St Monica's at Moonee Ponds in 1917, by Brothers C. O'Keefe and T. Quinn. Students at this school were taken from Grade III to Intermediate (Year 10).

In 1940, during the war period, not only were the students sent away to help in Ireland, the school was also extended to take the Leaving Certificate (Year 11), and this necessitated the building of the first St Bernard's on The Strand, Moonee Ponds, with Brother Cregan as the first headmaster.

In the mid-1950s, Brother Brendan Murphy organised the purchase of the West Essendon property. While initially used as sporting grounds, building work began at this site in the mid-1960s. Since then, the site has developed with all classes being located at West Essendon by 1995, at which time the Moonee Ponds site was sold. In 2001, the college set up its Santa Monica campus on the Great Ocean Road near Lorne. This campus is most notably used by Year 9 students where they live, study, and undertake outdoor education for four-week periods as part of the standard curriculum. Since 2023, the college has had its Year 9 students at a dedicated campus in Aberfeldie, known as Resurrection House. Resurrection House was formerly a Catholic primary school established in 1952, until it was closed and sold to St Bernard's College.

== Curriculum ==
St Bernard's College offers its senior students the Victorian Certificate of Education (VCE).

VCE results 2012-2025
Year	Rank	Median study score	Scores of 40+ (%)	Cohort size
2012	95	32	10.4	284
2013	98	32	11	297
2014	109	32	8.7	304
2015	95	32	10.5	384
2016	97	32	10.2	367
2017	139	31	8	314
2018	130	31	8.8	327
2019	172	30	7.5	339
2020	181	30	6	320
2021	201	30	5.3	299
2022	146	31	6.3	302
2023	198	30	5.6	347
2024	130	31	8	363
2025	132	31	8.4	312

== Term dates ==
For the 2025 Victorian school year, the current term dates are as below.

- Term 1 - Monday, 3 February (Years 7, 9, 11 & 12)/Tuesday 4 February (Years 8 & 10) - Friday, 4 April
- Term 2 - Tuesday, 22 April - Friday, 4 July
- Term 3 - Tuesday, 22 July - Friday, 19 September
- Term 4 - Monday, 6 October - Friday, 5 December

== Activities ==
=== Sports ===
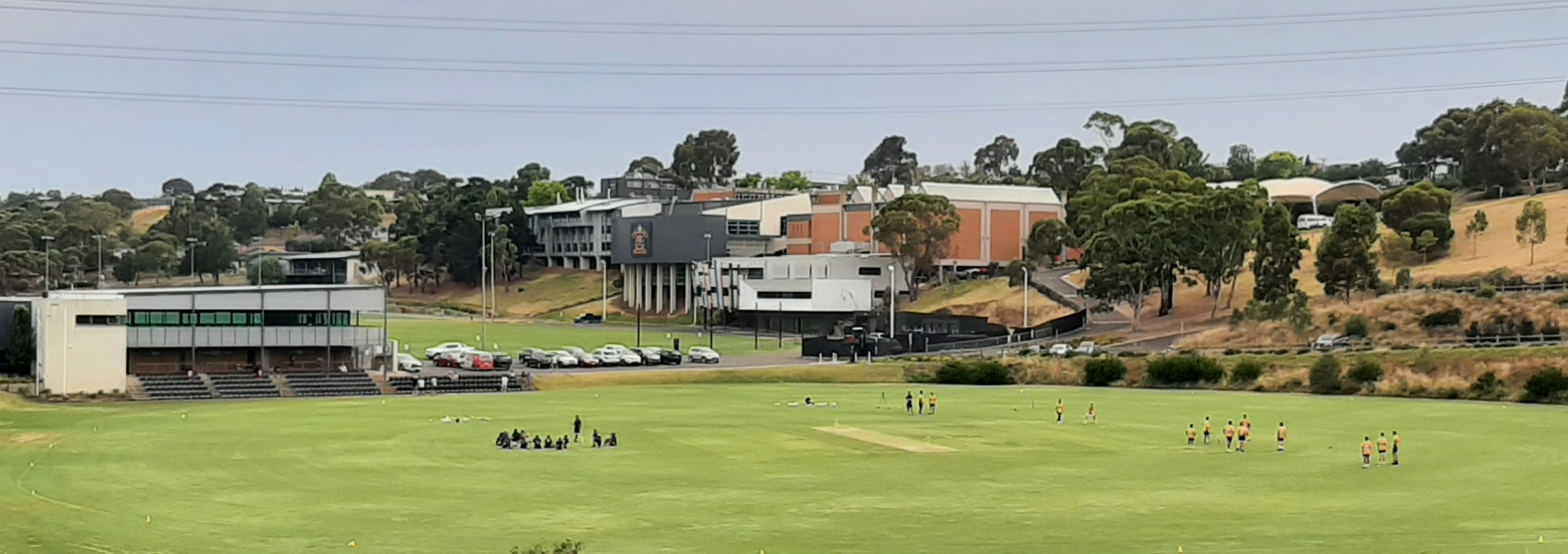
View of the St Bernard's College Oval

St Bernard's is a member of the Associated Catholic Colleges and competes against twelve other schools in sporting fixtures and carnivals. Students play week-end sport with the Old Collegians. St Bernards is particularly successful in Australian Rules Football, winning the Herald Sun Shield in 2017 and 2018. A number of boys from these sides have been drafted into the AFL like Noah Balta to Richmond, Xavier O'Halloran to Greater Western Sydney, (in the first round of the AFL draft) and Lachlan Sholl to Adelaide.

St Bernards had a record twelve straight Athletic championship wins from 2003 to 2014, under the coaching of Gerard Brown, a teacher with years of experience in the role as head coach of the Athletics squad and Cross Country team.

The St Bernard's Football Club, which competes in the Victorian Amateur Football Association (VAFA), plays its home matches at the St Bernard's College Oval.

==== ACC premierships ====
St Bernard's has won the following ACC premierships.

- Athletics (18) – 1988, 1989, 1990, 1991, 1992, 2001, 2003, 2004, 2005, 2006, 2007, 2008, 2009, 2010, 2011, 2012, 2013, 2014
- Basketball (2) – 1991, 2016
- Cricket (5) – 1979, 1997, 2005, 2018, 2021, 2024
- Cross Country (10) – 2005, 2006, 2007, 2008, 2009, 2011, 2012, 2013, 2014, 2015
- Australian Rules Football (16) – 1961, 1965, 1970, 1972, 1987, 1988, 1989, 1991, 1996, 2000, 2001, 2012, 2017, 2018, 2021, 2026
- Golf (3) – 2014, 2015, 2016
- Handball – 1956
- Hockey (7) – 2005, 2006, 2008, 2009, 2012, 2013, 2018
- Lawn Bowls (3) – 2021, 2024, 2025
- Football (6) – 1995, 1996, 1998, 2004, 2008, 2021, 2024
- Swimming (3) – 1995, 1998, 2012
- Table Tennis (4) – 2001, 2002, 2010, 2013
- Tennis (12) – 1952, 1954, 1991, 1997, 2001, 2004, 2007, 2008, 2009, 2016, 2018, 2019, 2024
- Triathlon – 2018
- Volleyball (4) – 1995, 1996, 1997, 2013

=== Performing arts ===
The college has musical productions and music programs. It has combined with St Columba's College, to stage shows annually. St Bernard's College productions in conjunction with St Columba's College have been recognised by the Music Theatre Guild of Victoria.

2024 – "Chicago"

- Commendation for Junior Production of the Year
- Linda Henderson, Nominee for Direction of a Junior Performance
- Linda Henderson, Kira Neilson & Monique Zammit, Nominees for Choreography
- Ed Chan, commended for Musical Direction of a Junior Production
- Cooper Marin, Recipient of Best Lead Performer in a Male Presenting Role as Billy Flynn
- Sienna Alexander, commended for Minor/Cameo Role as Emcee

== Notable alumni ==
- Noah Balta – Australian rules footballer for Richmond Tigers
- Jude Bolton – Australian rules footballer for Sydney Swans
- Joseph Camilleri – Professor of International Relations, La Trobe University
- Michael Carmody – Australian Federal Commissioner of Taxation
- Ben Carroll – 50th Premier of Victoria
- Jordan Schroder – Australian rules footballer for Geelong Cats
- Joe Daniher – Australian rules footballer for Essendon Bombers & Brisbane Lions; son of Anthony Daniher
- Garry Foulds – former Australian rules footballer for Essendon Bombers
- Andrew Johnston – Australian rules footballer for Fitzroy
- Scott Lucas- AFL player
- Brad Lloyd – former Australian rules footballer for Hawthorn Hawks
- Matthew Lloyd – Australian rules footballer for Essendon Bombers
- Francis Leach – Australian radio personality & sports commentator. Host of the drive show on SEN 1116 with fellow St Bernard's alumnus David Schwarz
- Hayden Kennedy – Senior Australian Rules Football Umpire
- Patrick Kisnorbo – Australian professional football manager and former Socceroo player who is currently the manager of Ligue 1 club Troyes
- Justin Madden – former Australian rules footballer for Carlton Blue and Essendon Bombers; former Member of the Legislative Assembly for Essendon in the Victorian Parliament
- Simon Madden – former Australian rules footballer for Essendon Bombers
- Michael Malouf – former chief executive officer of City of Melbourne Council; Former Chief Executive Officer of the Carlton Football Club
- Liam McBean – Australian rules footballer for Richmond Tigers
- Paul McNamee – former Davis Cup tennis player
- Brian Mannix – Singer, musician, actor, director, author
- Luke Mitchell – Australian rules footballer
- Steven Morris – Australian rules footballer for Richmond Tigers
- Christopher Mullins – Gold medal-winning Paralympic athlete
- Xavier O'Halloran – Australian rules footballer for GWS Giants
- James Polkinghorne- AFL footballer for Brisbane Lions and Essendon
- Jake Riccardi – Australian rules footballer for GWS Giants
- Ben Ronke – Australian rules footballer
- Lachlan Sholl – Australian rules footballer for Adelaide Crows
- Dane Swan – Australian rules footballer for Collingwood Magpies
- Ziggy Switkowski – former CEO of Telstra
- Rohan Welsh – former Australian rules footballer for Carlton Blues
- Chris Scerri – An Australian rules footballer who plays for Fremantle
- Pat McCluskey OAM – Co-founder of ANCA, an Australian engineering company

== Notable staff ==
- Eleni Glouftsis, the first female Australian rules football umpire

== See also ==
- List of schools in Victoria
- List of high schools in Victoria
- Victorian Certificate of Education
