= Notre Dame College, Shepparton =

Notre Dame College

Location
- Shepparton, Victoria; Australia; 36°22′30″S 145°24′28″E

Information
- Type: Independent co-educational secondary day school
- Motto: To seek – To see – To respond
- Religious affiliation: Association of Marist Schools of Australia
- Denomination: Roman Catholic
- Established: 1902; 124 years ago (as Sacred Heart College)| 1951; 75 years ago (as St Colmans College)| 1984; 42 years ago (as Amalgamated schools)|
- Status: Open
- Authority: Roman Catholic Diocese of Sandhurst
- Principal: John Cortese
- Years: 7–12
- Campus: Knight Street Campus; Emmaus/MCP (McAuley Champangat Programme) Campus
- Campus type: Regional
- Website: www.notredame.vic.edu.au

Notre Dame College is a dual-campus independent Roman Catholic co-educational secondary day school located in Shepparton, Victoria, Australia. The college is situated on two campuses: Knight Street Campus, that houses students in Year 7, 8, and 10–12; and the Emmaus Campus, on Grace Road, North Shepparton, that houses students in Year 9 and also the McAuley Champagnat Programme for students who struggle to learn in a normal classroom environment. The college is located in the Roman Catholic Diocese of Sandhurst.

== History ==
The college initially opened in on 24 February 1902 as Sacred Heart Convent – later Sacred Heart College, a school for girls. A boys' school, St Colman's College (which opened on 9 July 1951), was also built on Knight Street. Sacred Heart was established by the Sisters of Mercy, whilst St Colmans was established by the Marist Brothers.

The two schools merged in 1984 after a two-decade period of expansion and increased enrolments in both colleges. The new amalgamated school was named Notre Dame College, with the literal French meaning of "Our Lady". The campus of St Colman's became known as "South Side" and is the Junior Campus where years 7 to 8 attend. This is also home to the Mercy Centennial Stadium and the original Monastery. The original Sacred Heart campus is known as "North Side" and is home to students from Year 10 to Year 12, as well as the administration building, a chapel, the Ursula Frayne Library and the bishop Noel Daly centre. In 2009 there was a new campus unveiled known as the Emmaus Campus. It is a community for the Year 9 students only. The current principal is John Cortese.

The year 2001 celebrated the centenary of the establishment of the Sisters of Mercy in Shepparton. This was celebrated through the unveiling of the Mercy Centennial Stadium.

== Affiliations ==
In 1987, Notre Dame College became the sister school of Notre Dame of Marbel University in Koronodal, in the Philippines.

== Curriculum ==
=== School curriculum ===
The main areas of study at Notre Dame College are:

- Religious Education;
- English;
- Mathematics;
- Science;
- Technology;
- The Arts;
- Health, Physical Education and Sport;
- Languages other than English;
- Humanities

Italian and Japanese are the two languages taught at the school. In Year 7 and 8 students undertake study in a number of compulsory areas. From Year 9 to Year 10, study revolves around a number of core subjects, as well as electives chosen by the students. There is also a program, the Nova Program, on offer to Year 10 students aimed at those who may otherwise want to leave school. This provides a pathway for students to apprenticeships, the Victorian Certificate of Applied Learning, Vocational Education and Training and other employment opportunities.

During Year 11 and 12, there are three pathways available to students:

- Victorian Certificate of Education;
- Victorian Certificate of Applied Learning;
- Vocational Education and Training.

=== Additional information ===
The school hosts a Careers Day for Year 10 students, which is attended by over 1,500 students.

== School productions ==
Notre Dame is critically acclaimed for their musical productions. From 2005 to 2014, Notre Dame staged two productions annually. In addition to the whole school production, a junior production was performed by Year 7-9 students from 2005 to 2009. From 2009 to 2011, these Year 7–9 productions were replaced with a Year 9 production.

Year	Production	Director	Musical director/ musical director (orchestra)	Vocal coach/ musical director (vocals) (Note: In 2020 the title of Vocal Coach was changed to Musical Director (Vocals))	Choreographer	Trainee
1986	The Wizard of Oz	Karen Ewart	Karen Ewart	Unknown	Kathy Kyriakou	
1987	Godspell	Karen Ewart	Karen Ewart	Karen Ewart	Karen Ewart	
1988	Oliver!	Kierin Murphy	Unknown	Unknown	Unknown	
1989	Sweet Charity	Kierin Murphy	Karyn Joyce	Unknown	Unknown	
1990	Annie	Kierin Murphy	Unknown	Unknown	Unknown	
1991	My Fair Lady	Kierin Murphy	Devina McClure	Devina McClure	Amanda Rae	
1992	Fiddler on the Roof	Kierin Murphy	Devina McClure	Devina McClure	Unknown	
1993	Joan	Kierin Murphy	Devina McClure	Devina McClure	Unknown	
1994	The Pirates of Penzance	Kierin Murphy	Devina McClure	Devina McClure	Unknown	
1995	Peter Pan	Erika Gibson	Julie Leo	Unknown	Unknown	
1996	Anything Goes	Kierin Murphy	Trish Baggs	Trish Baggs	Jessica Enes; Julie Leo	
1997	Sweet Charity	Kierin Murphy	Julie Leo	Julie Leo	Libbie Cunneen	
1998	Man of La Mancha	Kierin Murphy	Neroli Cochrane; Julie Leo	Neroli Cochrane	Libbie Cunneen	
1999	West Side Story	Kierin Murphy	Julie Leo	Julie Leo	Libbie Cunneen; Cassie Milner	
2000	Joan	Kierin Murphy	Neroli Cochrane	Neroli Cochrane	Danelle Cooney; Olivia Fontana; Cassie Milner; Maree Quinn	
2001	Godspell	Kierin Murphy	Neroli Cochrane	Neroli Cochrane	Danelle Cooney	
2002	Fame	Kierin Murphy	Neroli Cochrane	Neroli Cochrane	Danelle Cooney	
2003	Into The Woods	Kierin Murphy	Neroli Cochrane	Neroli Cochrane	Kathie Duqueman; Kierin Murphy	
2004	Cabaret	Kierin Murphy	Neroli Cochrane	Ryan Black; Neroli Cochrane	Meg Cooney; Connie Daniel; Kate Lancaster; Shane Price	
2005	Bye Bye Birdie	Kierin Murphy	Neroli Cochrane	Neroli Cochrane	Connie Daniel; Dayna Tinline	
2005	Joseph and the Amazing Technicolor Dreamcoat	Kierin Murphy	Ryan Black	Ryan Black	Dayna Tinline	
2006	Beauty and the Beast	Kierin Murphy	Neroli Cochrane	Neroli Cochrane	Connie Daniel	
2006	The Wizard of Oz	Kierin Murphy	Ryan Black	Ryan Black	Emma Daniel	
2007	Chicago	Kierin Murphy	Neroli Cochrane	Neroli Cochrane	Emma Daniel; Jen Scandolera	Clare Stevenson
2007	Aladdin Jr	Kierin Murphy	Ryan Black	Ryan Black	Unknown	Clare Stevenson
2008	Pippin	Kierin Murphy	Neroli Cochrane	Neroli Cochrane; Dayna Tinline	Emma Daniel; Jen Scandolera; Dayna Tinline	Jake Warner
2008	Mulan Jr.	Kierin Murphy	Ryan Black	Ryan Black	Dayna Tinline	Jake Warner
2009	Seussical	Dayna Tinline	Julie Leo	Neroli Cochrane	Dayna Tinline; Jen Scandolera	Jamie Lea
2009	Little Shop of Horrors	Dayna Tinline	Jason Giuliani	Ryan Black	Kathryn Demase	Jamie Lea
2010	Les Misérables	Dayna Tinline	Ryan Black	Ryan Black; Neroli Cochrane	Dayna Tinline	Molly Dyson
2010	I Love Rock and Roll	Dayna Tinline	Jason Giuliani	Ryan Black	Dayna Tinline	Molly Dyson
2011	Jesus Christ Superstar	Dayna Tinline	Ryan Black	Ryan Black; Neroli Cochrane	Dayna Tinline	Krista Rumble
2011	Little Stars	Dayna Tinline	Jason Giuliani	Dayna Tinline	Dayna Tinline	Krista Rumble
2012	The Drowsy Chaperone	Dayna Tinline	Julie Leo	Neroli Cochrane	Dayna Tinline; Sam Coats	Marcus Egan
2012	High School Musical Jr	Dayna Tinline	Jason Giuliani	Dayna Tinline	Dayna Tinline	Marcus Egan
2013	Aida	Dayna Tinline	Julie Leo	Helen Janke; Dayna Tinline	Dayna Tinline	Georgie Wolfe
2013	Revolution!	Dayna Tinline	Jason Giuliani	Dayna Tinline	Dayna Tinline	Georgie Wolfe
2014	The Addams Family	Dayna Tinline	Julie Leo	Dayna Tinline	Dayna Tinline; Natalie Ginnane	Natalie Ginnane
2014	Beneath the Southern Cross	Dayna Tinline	Jason Giuliani	Dayna Tinline	Dayna Tinline; Natalie Ginnane	Natalie Ginnane
2015	Anything Goes	Casey Fogarty	Susan Dixon	Neroli Cochrane	Madi Jenkins; Phoebe Newman	Phoebe Newman
2016	Beauty and the Beast	Casey Fogarty	Susan Dixon	Neroli Cochrane; Jane Elshaw; Loretta Shannon	Robert Baxter; Nicola Messer	Nicola Messer
2017	Big Fish	Casey Fogarty	Jason Giuliani	Neroli Cochrane	Robert Baxter; Ruby Shannon	Robbie Maher
2018	Godspell	Casey Fogarty	Jason Giuliani	Neroli Cochrane	Robert Baxter	Robert Baxter
2019	School of Rock	Casey Fogarty	Jason Giuliani	Neroli Cochrane	Robert Baxter	Kane Wilson
2020	Seussical (Note: Seussical had been cast and work was well underway before it was cancelled due to the COVID-19 global pandemic..)	Casey Fogarty	Jason Giuliani	Neroli Cochrane	Sarah Anderson; Robert Baxter; Tayla Jenkins; Grace Newman	Sarah Anderson
2021	Little Shop of Horrors (Note: This production was closed one hour before opening night as Victoria was entered into a state wide lockdown)	Casey Fogarty	Jason Giuliani	Neroli Cochrane	Tayla Jenkins	Kirsty Jones
2022	Legally Blonde (musical)	Casey Fogarty	Tricia Baggs	Neroli Cochrane	Tayla Jenkins; Tia Saddlier; Angela Baxter; Denni Bathman	Stephanie Romeo

== Graduate Diploma in Education ==
Notre Dame College offers the year-long Graduate Diploma in Education (Secondary) in conjunction with Australian Catholic University and the Catholic Education Office, Sandhurst.

== Notable alumni ==
- Andrew Bragg, Australian senator, NSW
- Tom Clurey, Port Adelaide AFL footballer
- Peter Crimmins, Hawthorn AFL footballer
- Damian Drum, Geelong AFL footballer, Fremantle AFL coach, Victorian and Australian member of Parliament
- Chris Connolly, Melbourne AFL footballer, Fremantle AFL coach, Melbourne Football Club general manager
- Adam Donovan, member of the Australian band Augie March
- Marcus Drum, Fremantle and Geelong AFL footballer
- Vince Lia, Australian football player
- David McKenzie, SBS commentator, Athlete-cyclist seventh stage winner of the 2000 Giro d’Italia
- David Teague, North Melbourne and Carlton AFL footballer, Carlton AFL coach
- Marc Bullen, Essendon AFL footballer
- Sam Wright, North Melbourne AFL footballer
- Will Brodie, Gold Coast, Fremantle and Port Adelaide AFL footballer
- Michael Barlow, Fremantle and Gold Coast AFL footballer
- Lachlan Ash, GWS Giants AFL footballer
- Laitham Vandermeer, Western Bulldogs AFL footballer
- Nathan Drummond, Richmond AFL footballer
- Alou Kuol, Central Coast Mariners football player
- Jy Simpkin, North Melbourne AFL footballer
- Josh Rachele, Adelaide AFL footballer
- Garang Kuol, Socceroo and Newcastle United football Player
- Millie Brown, AFLW player
- Tom Brown, Richmond AFL player
- Margaret Twomey Ambassador of Australia to Italy

== See also ==
- List of non-government schools in Victoria
- Catholic education in Australia
