= Simonds Catholic College =

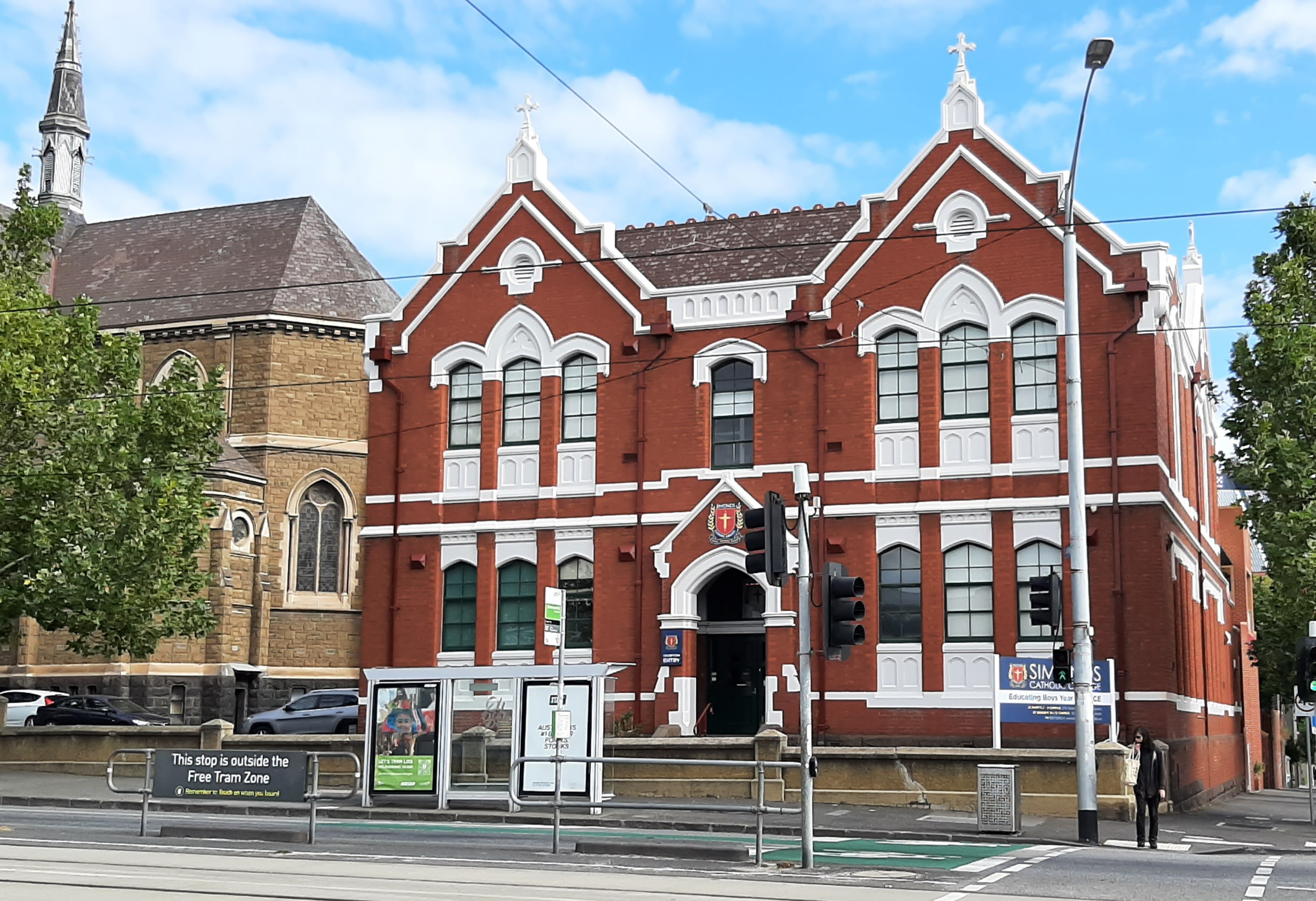
- School building on corner of Victoria St & Chetwynd St, West Melbourne

Location
- West Melbourne, Melbourne, Victoria; Australia; 37°48′22″S 144°57′9″E

Information
- Type: Independent, single-sex
- Motto: Known, Supported, Inspired
- Denomination: Roman Catholic
- Established: 1996
- Principal: Robert Anastasio
- Years: 7–12
- Gender: Boys
- Enrolment: 450
- Colours: Blue, maroon, gold
- Slogan: Where each individual matters
- Affiliation: Associated Catholic Colleges
- Website: www.sccmelb.catholic.edu.au

Simonds Catholic College is a Roman Catholic school for boys located in Melbourne. The school formally consisted of two campuses but switched to one campus in 2023, introducing the schools senior students to the St Mary Campus once again. The St Mary's campus is in West Melbourne located five minutes away from Queen Victoria Market.

== History ==
Simonds was formed in 1996 through the amalgamation of Cathedral College, East Melbourne, and St Mary's Boys School. In 2010, the former St Brigid's Primary School in North Fitzroy was renovated, and a new senior campus of the college was opened there. The school is named after Justin Simonds, the first Australian-born Archbishop of Melbourne from 1963 to 1967. He also served as parish priest of St Mary's, where the years 7-9 campus is located.

== Curriculum ==
Simonds College offers its senior students the Victorian Certificate of Education (VCE).

VCE results 2012-2025
Year	Rank	Median study score	Scores of 40+ (%)	Cohort size
2012	174	30	7.1	103
2013	185	30	6.9	104
2014	221	29	7.8	120
2015	267	29	2.6	115
2016	309	28	3	106
2017	158	31	4.2	107
2018	260	29	2.7	91
2019	180	30	5.8	95
2020	124	31	9	92
2021	178	30	7.3	103
2022	286	29	1	90
2023	325	28	1.7	84
2024	180	30	6.5	94
2025	269	29	3.4	100

== Houses ==
Simonds has a House program with four houses: Goold (Gold), Knox (Green), Mannix (Blue), and Polding (Red).

Throughout the year, students earn points for their houses through house sports, co-curricular activities, academic performance, and more. The main house competitions are the Swimming Carnival and the Athletics Carnival. Smaller events include ACC Sports (Basketball, Football, Lawn Bowls, Table Tennis, Badminton, Volleyball). High-performing students in these events are selected to represent the school in the Associated Catholic Colleges Swimming and Athletics Championships.
