= Whitefriars College =

Location
- 156 Park Road; Donvale, Victoria 3111; Australia; 37°47′26″S 145°12′1″E

Information
- Type: Independent, single-sex
- Motto: Latin: Almae in Fide Parentis (In The Care of a Loving Mother)
- Denomination: Carmelite
- Established: 1961
- Chairman: Peter Duffy
- Principal: Mark Murphy
- Chaplain: Fr Matthew Tonini O.Carm
- Years: 7–12
- Gender: Boys
- Enrolment: 1,055
- Colours: Brown, gold & navy blue
- Slogan: Belong. Believe. Become.
- School fees: $15,09–$16,796
- Affiliation: Associated Catholic Colleges
- Website: www.whitefriars.vic.edu.au

Whitefriars College is a Roman Catholic Independent school for boys located in the Melbourne suburb of Donvale, Australia. Established in 1961, the college reflects the tradition of the Carmelites, and is recognised for its uniform's brown blazer with the college crest appearing on the breast pocket. The college has been a member of the Associated Catholic Colleges since 1999. The college was one of the first schools in Victoria to implement a notebook-computer program, which has now transitioned to a notebook-tablet program, in which every student is provided with a notebook-tablet.

== House system ==
The college has eight houses, each one named after a Carmelite of note. The houses are:

| House name | Patron | Colour |
|---|---|---|
| Avila | Teresa of Avila | |
| Brandsma | Titus Brandsma | |
| Corsini | Andrew Corsini | |
| Lisieux | Therese of Lisieux | |
| Stein | Edith Stein | |
| Mantua | Baptista Mantuanus | |
| Soreth | John Soreth | |
| Trinity | Elizabeth of the Trinity | |

As there is a vertical pastoral care (more commonly known as homeroom) system at the college, each house is made up of six pastoral care groups and each group contains approximately 24 students. This change was made in 2005. Each house is governed by a Head of House. Unlike other schools, students at Whitefriars College are more so responsible to their respective Head of House combined with Pastoral Care teacher, than that of their Year level co-ordinator.

== Curriculum ==
Whitefriars College offers its senior students the Victorian Certificate of Education (VCE).

VCE results 2012-2024
| Year | Rank | Median study score | Scores of 40+ (%) | Cohort size |
|---|---|---|---|---|
| 2012 | 84 | 32 | 14.2 | 308 |
| 2013 | 140 | 31 | 8.2 | 289 |
| 2014 | 136 | 31 | 8.1 | 299 |
| 2015 | 135 | 31 | 8.3 | 336 |
| 2016 | 148 | 31 | 7.3 | 316 |
| 2017 | 184 | 30 | 5.9 | 289 |
| 2018 | 198 | 30 | 4.5 | 307 |
| 2019 | 122 | 31 | 9.3 | 275 |
| 2020 | 146 | 31 | 5.9 | 271 |
| 2021 | 128 | 31 | 9.2 | 274 |
| 2022 | 150 | 31 | 5.5 | 266 |
| 2023 | 96 | 32 | 10 | 262 |
| 2024 | 175 | 30 | 7 | 238 |
| 2025 | 145 | 31 | 6.5 | 217 |

== 50 years celebration ==
The college celebrated its 50th year in operation from 2010 to 2011. The school received a New Chapel, Quadrangle and Classrooms to commemorate the occasion. In addition to this, some existing classrooms were also renovated. Students were also presented with a 50-year badge to be worn on their blazer lapel.

== Principals ==
| Year | Tenure | Name | Notes |
|---|---|---|---|
| 1961–1972 | 11 Years | Frank Shortis, O.Carm | |
| 1973–1976 | 3 Years | Bernie McPhee, O.Carm | |
| 1977–1978 | 1 Year | Peter Byrth, O.Carm | |
| 1978–1988 | 10 Years | Noel Kierce, O.Carm | Served as College Chaplain until 2015 |
| 1989–1995 | 6 Years | Hugh Brown, O.Carm | |
| 1996–2012 | 16 Years | Paul Cahill, O.Carm | Longest serving Principal |
| 2013–2017 | 4 Years | John Finn | First lay Principal |
| 2018 | 1 Year | Anthony Kirley | |
| 2019 | 1 Year | Gregory Stewart | Temporary Appointment |
| 2020–2025 | Present | Mark Murphy | |

== Sport ==
Whitefriars is a member of the Associated Catholic Colleges (ACC).

=== ACC premierships ===
Whitefriars has won the following ACC premierships.

- Basketball (11) – 2001, 2004, 2005, 2006, 2007, 2009, 2010, 2011, 2012, 2013, 2019
- Cricket (5) – 2002, 2003, 2012, 2015, 2020
- Football (4) – 2004, 2005, 2013, 2014
- Hockey (3) – 2014, 2015, 2017
- Swimming (13) – 1999, 2000, 2001, 2002, 2003, 2004, 2005, 2006, 2008, 2014, 2015, 2016, 2017
- Tennis (6) – 2011, 2012, 2017, 2020, 2021, 2023

== Community service ==
The school has two student-run community service organisations, the Key Club, sponsored by the Doncaster-Templestowe Kiwanis, and Young St. Vinnie's. Both groups work in the school community as well as in the wider community on a number of projects. The Key Club runs a recycling drive and St Vinnie's runs a weekly blood donation drive, in which VCE students are encouraged to give blood.

- Brad Gocht, professional [career/achievement]

== Notable alumni ==
- John Blakey – North Melbourne Football Club Premiership player
- Mark Bunn- Fitzroy and Hawthorn footballer
- Jackson Archer- AFL player
- Pat Cash-tennis player
- Sam Collins – Fremantle Football Club, Gold Coast Football Club Footballer and No. 55 2015 NAB AFL Draft
- Patrick Cronin – Manslaughter victim
- Stephen Donaghue – Solicitor-General of Australia
- Stephen Gilham- AFL player, Hawthorn premiership player
- Damian Keogh- Basketballer
- David Morris – 2010 Olympic Aerial Skier and Australian record holder; 2014 Winter Olympic silver medalist.
- John Murphy- Australian rules footballer
- Marc Murphy (2005) – Carlton Footballer and No. 1 AFL Draft Pick. Former Captain of Carlton Football Club
- Xavier O'Neill – West Coast Eagles footballer
- Andy Otten (2007) – Adelaide Football Club and No. 27 draft pick 2007
- Christian Petracca – Melbourne Football Club Footballer and No. 2 2014 NAB AFL Draft, 2021 Premiership player, 2021 Norm Smith Medalist
- Victor Perton – Long standing member for Doncaster (1988–2006)
- Nicholas Reece – Lord Mayor of Melbourne and Chair of Movember, former senior advisor to the Prime Minister and Secretary of the Victorian Labor Party
- Ben Simmons – Philadelphia 76ers NBA Basketballer and No. 1 2016 NBA Draft
- Josh Smillie - AFL player
- Cooper Trembath-AFL player
- Paul van der Haar – Essendon Football Club Footballer – 1984 / 1985 Premiership Winners – Essendon Team of the Century
- Karl von Möller – Film Director and Cinematographer
- Sam Weideman – Melbourne Football Club Footballer and No. 9 2015 NAB AFL Draft
- Joseph Zema – Canadian football player
- Patrick Lipinski – Western Bulldogs Football Club and Collingwood Footballer and No. 28 2016 NAB AFL Draft
- Dylan Williams – AFL Footballer
- Nick Coffield – AFL Footballer

== Controversy ==
In 2019, Whitefriars reached a confidential settlement with a student relating to accusations that the school failed to take adequate action after an older student allegedly groomed and sexually abused at least two younger boys.

On May 5, 2023, two Year 9 students were taken to Box Hill Hospital at 9am and 12:50pm respectively following allergic reactions to vapes laced with Cannabis and LSD.

== See also ==
- List of schools in Victoria
- List of high schools in Victoria
- Victorian Certificate of Education
