= Melbourne City School =

Location
- Melbourne, Victoria; 37.81715°S 144.95592°E

Information
- Type: Private school, independent, co-educational
- Denomination: Non-denominational
- Established: 2010
- Closed: 2012
- Principal: Jennifer Langmead
- Head of school: Belinda Cupples
- Grades: Kindergarten–Year 9
- Colors: Red, white, black & grey
- Website: http://www.mcs.vic.edu.au

Melbourne City School was an independent, co-educational Prep to Year 9 school located in the Melbourne Central Business District on King Street. Melbourne City School was founded in 2010 as an initiative of Eltham College, but closed at the end of 2012 due to low enrolments.

== Campus ==
Melbourne City School was the first and only school in Melbourne’s CBD in the modern era, with various schools being located there in the nineteenth century.

Melbourne City School was located in a three-story heritage building and comprises two schools, Melbourne City School (Prep – Year 6) and the Eltham College City Campus (Year 7 – Year 9). During Year 9 students from Eltham College’s Research Campus participate in a unique year-long City Experience at the City Campus which prepares students for life in the city should their career path be based there. The Year 9 City Experience program, previously located on Flinders Lane has been in existence since 1996 and was the catalyst for establishing Melbourne City School.

The development of Melbourne City School acknowledged the regeneration of Melbourne’s CBD, and the need for a city school, with more families choosing to live in the city and neighbouring suburbs such as The Docklands and Southbank.

== Curriculum ==
Melbourne City School offered a personalised learning approach which is equally focussed on individual development and social and emotional intelligence. The school utilised the diverse resources of the city and connections to city businesses to complement the formal curriculum and extend student learning and engagement. The school had a two-way partnership with Zoos Victoria.

=== Inquiry Learning and Discovery Projects ===
Inquiry Learning and Discovery Projects were used to encourage the development of critical contemporary skills such as time management, problem solving, collaboration and imaginative thinking.

=== Music ===
As well as timetabled music sessions students could also participate in private instrumental lessons for piano, guitar and violin. Students participated in the record-breaking 2012 Moomba parade.

=== LOTE ===
Mandarin Chinese was taught, from Year 3, by a native Mandarin speaker.

=== Physical Education ===
The city’s facilities, sporting calendar and Melbourne City School's connections to organisations and clubs were integrated into the school’s sports curriculum. Students used the onsite courtyard and facilities at Flagstaff Gardens, the Melbourne Sports and Aquatic Centre (MSAC), City Baths and Princess Park for their sporting activities. Students participate in a whole range of programs including, European handball and Tri-Athlon training as well as more traditional sports.

== Extended Hours Care ==
Melbourne City School offered an extended hours care program operating from 7am to 7pm during term time. There was also an onsite holiday program. The extended hours care program and school flexibility has been recognised as a unique selling point of Melbourne City School, targeted at working families, and was featured heavily in the media when the school opened.
