= Acacia College =

- Mernda, Victoria; Australia

Information
- Type: private school, co-educational, day
- Motto: Fresh, Unique and Surprising
- Denomination: Uniting Church in Australia
- Established: 2010
- Closed: 2012
- Principal: Andrew Houghton
- Enrolment: 520 Prep–Year 9 (2012)
- Colours: Green, black and red
- Website: www.acacia.vic.edu.au

Acacia College (2010–2012) was an Australian co-educational school located in Mernda, Victoria. The school was owned by the Uniting Church.

Acacia College opened in January 2010 in one of Melbourne's new residential areas. Information sessions were held in the year before opening and interest in places at the school was strong.

On 17 October 2012, the school announced that it would be closing on 14 December because its owners, the Uniting Church, had found the school was not financially viable. The site was sold and has become a second campus of Gilson College.
