= Kevin Mithen =

Australian rules footballer

Personal information
- Full name: Kevin Francis Mithen
- Born: 14 April 1936
- Died: 23 July 2014 (aged 78)
- Original team: Ormond
- Height: 178 cm (5 ft 10 in)
- Weight: 75.5 kg (166 lb)

Playing career^{1}
Years	Club	Games (Goals)
1957–58	Melbourne	4 (0)
1962	South Melbourne	4 (1)
Total		8 (1)
- ^{1} Playing statistics correct to the end of 1962.

Kevin Francis Mithen (14 April 1936 – 23 July 2014) was an Australian rules footballer who played with Melbourne and South Melbourne in the Victorian Football League (VFL).
