= Caroline Chisholm Catholic College, Melbourne =

Caroline Chisholm Catholic College

Location
- Braybrook, Victoria; Australia; 37.7862°S 144.8491°E

Information
- Type: Private co-educational day school
- Motto: Many Minds, One Heart
- Denomination: Roman Catholic
- Established: 1964 (Christ the King College); 1965 (St John's College); 1979 (Chisholm College); 1997 (Amalgamation)
- Founder: Brothers of the Sacred Heart
- Principal: Napoleon Rodezno
- Enrolment: 1500 (7–12)
- Colours: Red, grey and black
- Website: www.cccc.vic.edu.au

Caroline Chisholm Catholic College is a Roman Catholic co-educational secondary day school for years 7–12 located in the western suburb of Braybrook in Melbourne, Australia. It was founded in 1997 by the amalgamation of three colleges.

== History ==
Caroline Chisholm Catholic College was founded in 1997 with the amalgamation of three Braybrook colleges: St John's College for Boys, Christ the King College for Boys, and Chisholm College.

Pasawm Lyhym (aged 16 years old) was killed in a school stabbing at Sunshine Station on a Thursday, 18 May. The victim was from Staughton College. There were two other victims injured but later treated at hospital. Some offenders were from Caroline Chisholm Catholic College evident by their bags. Four boys were charged. Security guards were then placed at Caroline Chisholm Catholic College for security reasons. On the 1st of August, two teenagers were charged after a 15-year-old was chased from the outside of the school grounds of Caroline Chisholm Catholic College by two males brandishing machetes. Some news articles said it may be revenge for the death of Pasawm Lyhym).

== School life ==
Caroline Chisholm Catholic College has three campuses. Boys in years seven through nine attend the St John's Campus, girls in years seven through nine attend the Christ the King Campus, and all students in years ten through twelve attend the Sacred Heart Campus.

The college is a member of the Sports Association of Catholic Co-educational Secondary Schools (SACCSS) where students compete in a range of sports, including soccer, football, netball, volleyball, swimming and a range of other team and individual sports. The college has a swimming pool, known as the LeBreton swimming center, where they teach and provide education for students on the rules and regulations of water safety.

There are four houses at Caroline Chisholm Catholic College: Ambrose (blue), Clare (green), Galgani (yellow), and Lorenzo (violet).

== Religious associations ==
- Brothers of the Sacred Heart
- Society of the Sacred Heart
- Sisters of St Joseph of the Sacred Heart
- Franciscan Missionaries of the Divine Motherhood (FMDM)

== See also ==
- List of schools in Victoria
- Caroline Chisholm
