= Maranatha Christian School =

- Doveton, Officer, Endeavour Hills, Victoria; Australia

Information
- Type: Christian
- Motto: My Utmost For His Glory
- Established: 1970
- Principal: William Jackson
- Houses: Acacia; Grevillea; Kurrajong; Waratah
- Colours: navy blue, yellow
- Website: www.maranatha.vic.edu.au

Maranatha Christian School (MCS), is a co-ed, non-denominational Christian school with campuses spread out between Doveton, Victoria, Officer, Victoria, and Endeavour Hills, Victoria.

== Curriculum ==
Maranatha provides education for all year levels, from kindergarten to year 12.

MCS also offers the Victorian Certificate of Education to year 10, year 11, and year 12 students along with the Victorian Certificate of Applied Learning.
