= Kilbreda College =

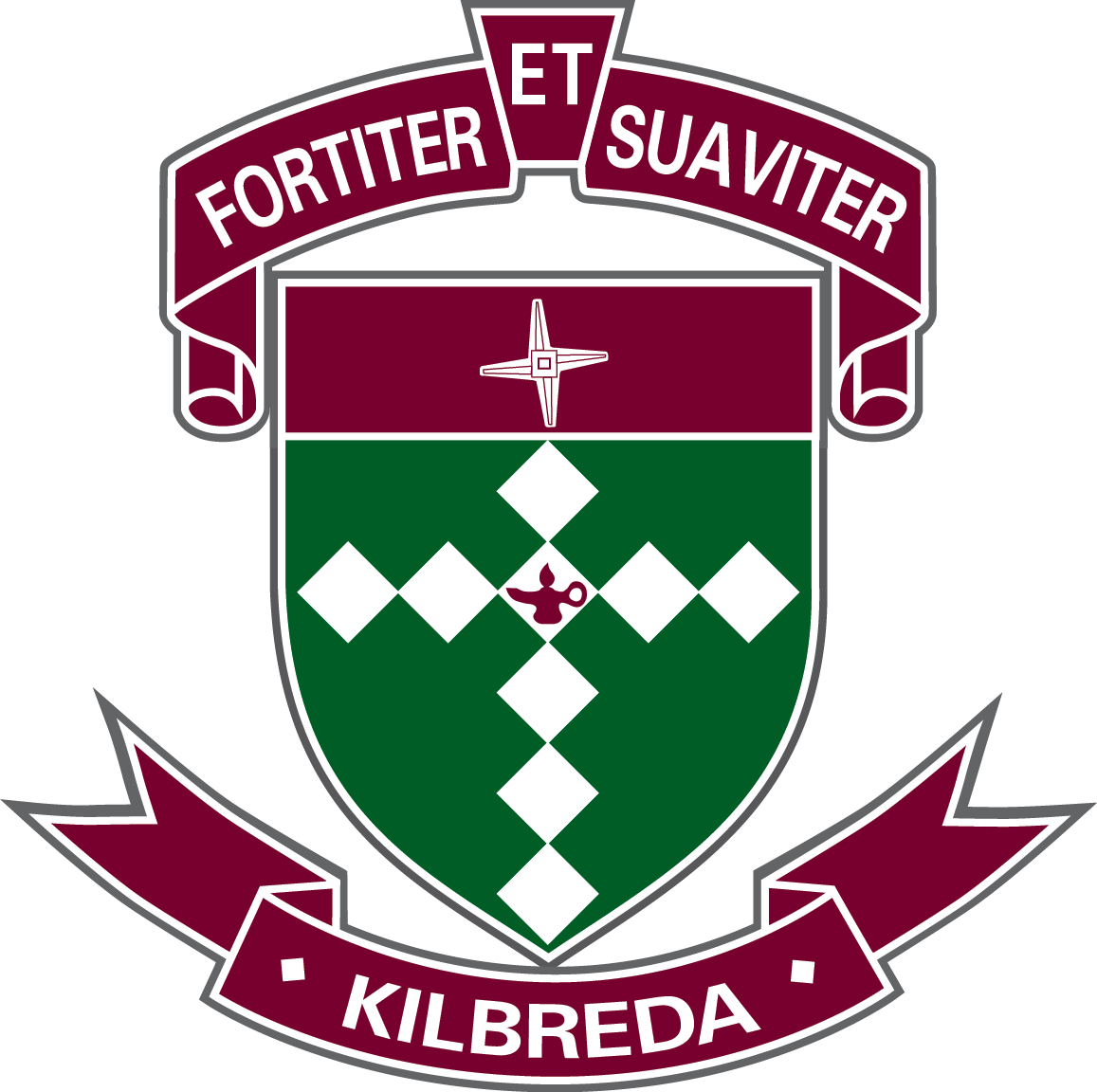

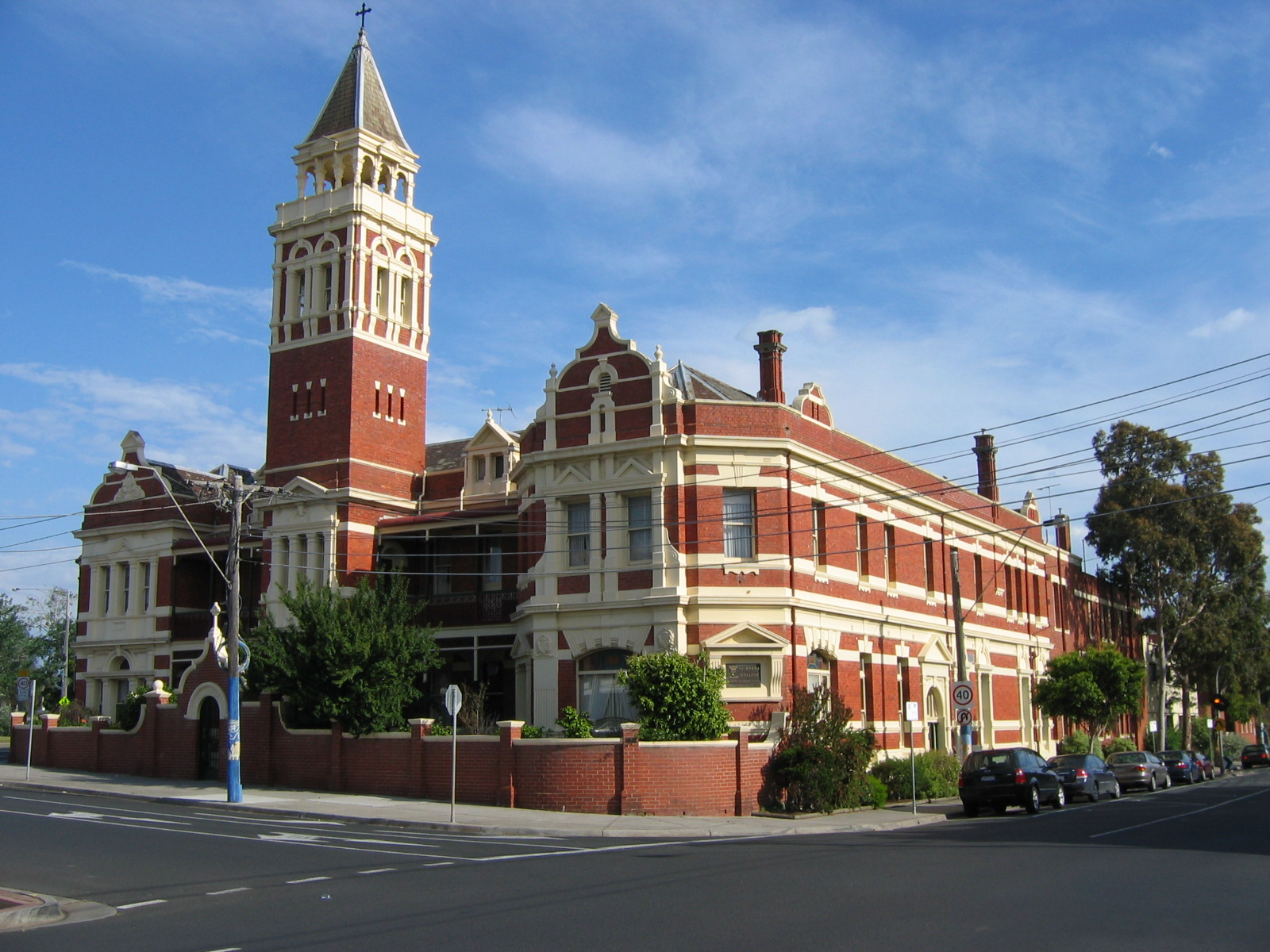
- Kilbreda College Mentone

Location
- Mentone, Victoria; Australia
- Coordinates: 37°59′0″S 145°3′55″E

Information
- Former name: Brigidine Convent School
- Type: Independent secondary day school
- Motto: Latin: Fortiter et Suaviter (Strength and Kindliness)
- Religious affiliation: Brigidine Sisters
- Denomination: Roman Catholic
- Established: 1904; 122 years ago
- Principal: Nicole Mangelsdorf
- Gender: Girls
- Enrolment: 900
- Campus type: Suburban
- Colours: Ruby, grey, white
- Website: kilbreda.vic.edu.au

Kilbreda College is an independent Roman Catholic secondary day school for girls, located in the Melbourne suburb of Mentone, Victoria, Australia. It was founded in 1904 by the Brigidine Sisters and is governed by Kildare Ministries.

== Origins of the school building ==
The original façade of the building was built by the Royal Coffee Palace Company Limited. It was opened in November 1887 and was known as the Mentone Coffee Palace. The Coffee Palace was the social centre of the town, situated on the corners of Mentone Parade, Florence Street and Como Parade. It is also near Mentone station (formerly known as Balcombe Road Station until 1884) and is surrounded by local shops. In the 1890s due to competition with Mentone Hotel and the Depression, the Coffee Palace could no longer be run. In 1894 it fell into the hands of the Mercantile Bank of Australia, and the name of the building was changed to Como House. After this the Coffee Palace was only used occasionally for varying purposes. The Brigidine Sisters bought the Coffee Palace in mid-July 1904 for £2,050, considering the actual cost of the building and furniture, excluding land, was £25,500.

== Related Schools ==
Other schools governed by Kildare Ministries are:

- Brigidine College (Indooroopilly)
- Brigidine College (St Ives)
- Clonard College (Geelong)
- Kildare College (Holden Hill)
- Killester College (Springvale)
- Marian College (Ararat)
- Marian College (Sunshine West)
- St. Joseph’s College (Echuca)
- Star of the Sea College (Brighton)

== Brigidine convent ==
On 7 August 1904 the Brigidine Convent School was officially opened and blessed by Archbishop Thomas Carr, and classes began the next day. On opening, the school had three pupils enrolled in their Convent School and 25 pupils enrolled in St. Patrick's Parish Primary which was located in the Church. The fee-paying convent school began taking boarders in 1905 and subsequently obtained registration as a sub-primary, primary and secondary school. The nuns owned a farm in nearby Johnston street which the students often visited. Boarders and students of primary school age have been phased out; the final primary class being in 1978. The school has been single sex (girls) for many decades. In the 1930s the school's name was changed to Kilbreda College, the name coming from the Gaelic Cill – church or community and Breda – Brigid. Therefore, Kilbreda means Church or Community of Saint Brigid.

== Houses ==
- Tullow (red)

Tullow is named after Tullow in the Republic of Ireland. This location was of special note to St. Brigid and the Brigidine Sisters.

- Kildare (blue)

Kildare is named after a county in Ireland which holds specials value to St. Brigid and the Brigidine Sisters.

- Delany (yellow)

Delany is named after Bishop Daniel Delany who helped and accompanied the Brigidine Sisters travel to Australia and set up some of the first Catholic school run in the Brigidine Tradition.

- Brigid (green)

Brigid was named after St. Brigid who was the inspiration behind the Brigidine sisters and therefore the School.

== Principals ==
The following individuals have served as College Principals:

Ordinal	Officeholder	Term start	Term end	Time in office	Notes
1	Mother Margaret Mary Murphy	1904	1915	10–11 years	
2	Mother Berchmans Foley	1916	1926	9–10 years	
3	Mother Margaret Mary Bourke	1927	1965	37–38 years	
4	Sister Barbara Mathews	1966	1971	4–5 years	
5	Sister Pius Kennedy	1972	1973	0–1 years	
6	Sister Marietta Rea	1974	1978	3–4 years	
7	Sister Rosemarie Joyce	1979	1980	0–1 years	
8	Sister Angela Ryan	1981	1983	1–2 years	
9	Sister Catherine Kelly	1984	1984	0 years	
10	Sister Mary Dalton	1985	1995	9–10 years	
11	Carmel Smart	1995	1995	0 year	
−	Sister Angela Ryan	1996	1999	2–3 years	
12	Sister Helen Toohey	1999	2006	6–7 years	
13	Mary Stack	2007	2015	7–8 years	
14	Teresa Lincoln	2016	2018	1–2 years	(joint appointment)
15	Nicole Mangelsdorf	2016	2025	9–10 years	(joint appointment, 2016–2018)
16	Stephanie Smyth	2025	incumbent		

== Core values and symbols ==
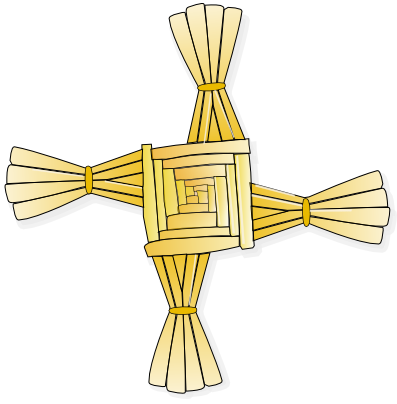
St. Brigid's cross

Most Brigidine schools follow the same core values, motto and school symbols.

The Brigidine Schools' symbols are:

- Brigid's Cross – The kind of cross St. Brigid used when teaching about the Catholic faith. It is made from woven reeds.
- The Oak Tree – St. Brigid's monastery in Tullow, is called Kildare. Kildare meaning 'the church of the oak'. Many Brigidine schools grow an oak tree from an acorn taken from one of the oak trees in Tullow.
- The Lamp of Learning – represents the light of Christian faith
- School Badge – was designed by the Irish College of Heraldry. The large cross of diamonds is taken from the badge of Bishop Daniel Delany, the bishop who founded the Brigidine Sisters in 1807. The middle diamond contains an image of the lamp of learning, and the image of St. Brigid's cross is contained in the top section.

== Notable pupils ==
- Catherine Arlove – three-time Olympian who competed at the 2008 Beijing, 2004 Athens and 2000 Sydney Olympics in judo
- Simone De La Rue – Former dancer turned Hollywood fitness expert, and founder of Body By Simone dance based fitness studios
- Noeleen Dix AM
- Mary-Anne Fahey – actress, comedian and writer
- Maggie Fitzgibbon OAM – actress and singer
- Ann Henderson – Former Australian Politician
- Dr Bridie Kean – wheelchair basketball player, bronze medalist at the 2008 Summer Paralympics in Beijing, silver medalist at the 2012 Summer Paralympics in London
- Judith Kinnear – the first woman to head a New Zealand university
- Tania Luiz – Olympian who competed at the 2008 Beijing Olympics in badminton
- Bree Munro – 2010 Winter Olympian who competed in freestyle skiing
- Vikki Petraitis – author of crime novels
- The Honorable Marilyn Warren AC – former chief justice of the Supreme Court of Victoria and former lieutenant governor of Victoria

== See also ==
- List of non-government schools in Victoria
- St. Brigid
- Victorian Certificate of Education
- Vocational Education and Training
- Victorian Certificate of Applied Learning
