= Phyllis Papps =

Australian librarian (1944–2026)

- Born: Phyllis Miranda Papaioannou; 15 April 1944; Egypt
- Died: 17 January 2026 (aged 81); Melbourne, Victoria, Australia
- Occupation: Librarian
- Known for: Lesbian feminist activism

Phyllis Papps (14 April 1944 – 17 January 2026) was an Australian lesbian feminist activist and a librarian at the State Library of Victoria. She published research in a history journal and volunteered her time for lesbian and feminist community organisations.

== Life and career ==
Phyllis Papps was born in Egypt, to a traditional Greek family and emigrated to Australia in 1950. She was educated at Ringwood School in Melbourne and undertook a librarianship training program at the State Library of Victoria.

She met Francesca Curtis (1931–2021) in June 1970, at a meeting of the Daughters of Bilitis, Australia, a chapter of the US based Daughters of Bilitis organisation. The Australian Daughters of Bilitis group became the Australian Lesbian Movement. In July 1970, the two exchanged wedding bands, although same-sex marriage was not legally recognized in Australia.

Papps and Curtis were the first lesbian couple to discuss their relationship on Australian national television in 1970, when they were interviewed for a segment on the ABC's "This Day Tonight" program. Papps lost her job at a public library following backlash from the interview, and her mother "took legal action" to prevent Phyllis from claiming her inheritance.

In the 1970s and 1980s, Papps worked on projects related to women's history. In 1976, she helped found the organization Gay Librarians. In 1985, she was an organizer of the International Women’s Day exhibition.

Papps published her research about Barrett Reid in the LaTrobe Journal.

After retiring, Papps worked on projects about herself and Curtis. The two did not get legally married after same-sex marriage was legalised in Australia in 2017, having considered themselves married since 1970. Papps died in Melbourne on 17 January 2026, at the age of 81.

== Recognition and legacy ==
In 2019, Papps and Curtis received the Lifetime Achievement Award at the Australian LGBTI Awards.

In 2020, a documentary about Papps and Curtis' relationship was released, titled "Why Did She Have to Tell the World?" and written and directed by AP Pobjoy. The documentary won Best Film, Queer Screen at Mardi Gras Film Festival, Sydney 2021 and Best Australian Short at Melbourne Queer Film Festival, Melbourne 2021.

Papps and Curtis donated their papers to the Australian Queer Archives. Papps conducted several oral history interviews stored in the AQuA collection.
