= Brigidine College =

Brigidine College may refer to:

- Brigidine College, Indooroopilly
- Brigidine College Randwick
- Brigidine College, St Ives
