= Calibre (disambiguation) =

Caliber or calibre is the diameter of a gun barrel.

Calibre or caliber may also refer to:

== Science and technology ==
- Caliber (artillery), a measure of barrel diameter and length
- Caliber (horology), a designation of clockwork movements
- Caliber (mathematics), a cardinal κ associated with a topological space
- Calibre (software), an ebook manager and editor

== Arts, entertainment and media ==
- Calibre (musician) (born Dominick Martin), Northern Irish drum and bass producer
- Calibre (film), a 2018 thriller film

=== Comics ===
- Caliber (Radical Comics), a comic book limited series from Radical Comics
- Caliber Comics, an American comic book publisher
- Calibre (comics), an Azteca Publications character
- Caliber, a Marvel Comics supervillain and enemy of Alpha Flight

== Other uses ==
- Caliber 40, an American sailboat design
- Dodge Caliber, a model of car
- Calibre (menswear), Australian clothing company

== See also ==
- Caliper, a measurement device
- Kaliber (disambiguation)
- Opel Calibra, a car
