= Caliper (disambiguation) =

Calipers are an instrument used to measure the dimensions of an object.

Caliper(s) or calliper(s) may also refer to:

- Brace (orthopaedic), especially a leg brace
- Calipers, components of a disc brake
- Caliper brakes, a type of bicycle brake
- Caliper, the measured thickness of paper, in paper and ink testing

== See also ==
- Caliber (disambiguation)
- Rotating calipers, an algorithm an algorithm design technique in computational geometry
- Compass (drawing tool)
