= Mary Synan =

Australian Brigidine sister (1837–1915)

Rev. Mother Mary John Synan csb
- Church: Roman Catholic
- Archdiocese: Melbourne

Personal details
- Born: Mary Synan; 26 January 1837 Limerick, Ireland
- Died: 6 March 1915 (aged 78) Randwick, Australia
- Denomination: Roman Catholic
- Occupation: Brigidine sister, Mother Provincial
- Profession: 17 January 1857

Mary Synan (26 January 1837 – 6 March 1915) was an Australian Brigidine sister who served as Provincial Superior of the order from 1893 to 1907.

== Life ==
Mary Synan was born in County Limerick, Ireland, in 1837. Her parents were Mary (née Sullivan) and her husband, John Synan, who was a grocer and draper. After completing her schooling at the Brigidine Convent in Mountrath, Queen's County (now County Laois), Mary joined the Sisters of St Brigid at the age of 16. Two of Mary's sisters also joined the same Brigidine order, which had been founded in 1807. Mary was professed on 17 January 1857 and took the religious name Mary John.

In 1882, the Brigidine Sisters were invited to take charge of a school at Coonamble, in New South Wales, by Bishop James Murray of Maitland. On 21 June 1883, Synan was one of six pioneering Sisters who travelled to Coonamble and establish the first Brigidine foundation in Australia. The sisters travelled for 2 months on the ship Chimborazo, then on a horse-drawn wagon for 10 days, before arriving in Coonamble and establishing a Catholic school. They taught primary and secondary students, and by February 1884, the first boarders were in residence.

Synan was the congregation's first leader. She was Mother Provincial from 1893 to 1907 and was succeeded by Johanna Barron, who was in the role from 1908 to 1920.

Synan was noted as a woman of vision, admired for her organising ability, leadership qualities and insight. She was also cultured and intelligent, and these attributes played a role in the development of the high standard of education at Brigidine schools. Under her leadership the Brigidines established schools in Cooma (1887), Cowra (1894), Cundletown (1899) and Randwick, Sydney (1901), with the convent at Randwick becoming the provincial house and novitiate. The Brigidines also opened schools in New Zealand at Masterton (1898), Foxton (1901) and Pahiatua (1906).

In 1907 the Golden Jubilee of the Mother Provincial Rev. Mother Mary John Synan was celebrated at the Mother-House in Randwick. It was also a celebration of the centenary of the Brigidine order.

In 2023, many Brigidine sisters returned to the town of Coonamble to celebrate 140 years since their arrival. Their success in Coonamble had inspired the Brigidines to establish congregations in many other areas of Australia and New Zealand.

Synan died on 6 March 1915 in Randwick and was buried at the Long Bay cemetery.
