= Australian Queer Archives =

LGBT archive in Australia

Australian Queer Archives (AQuA)
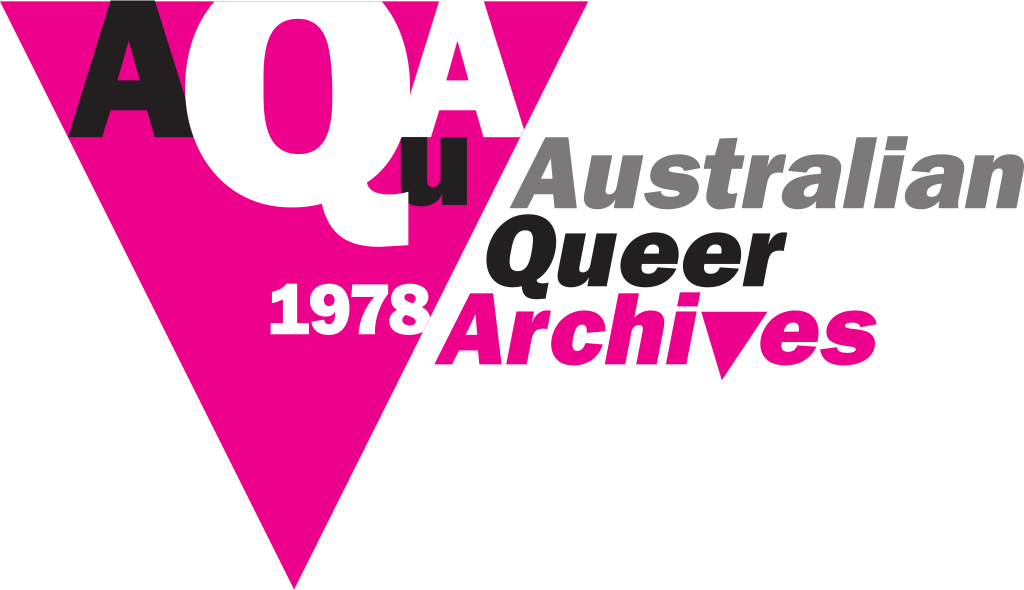
- Interactive map of Australian Queer Archives (AQuA)
- 37.86084°S 144.97650°E
- Location: 79–81 Fitzroy Street, St Kilda VIC 3182, St Kilda, Victoria, Australia
- Established: 1978
- Website: queerarchives.org.au

The Australian Queer Archives (AQuA) (formerly the Australian Lesbian and Gay Archives - ALGA) is a community-based non-profit organisation committed to the collection, preservation and celebration of material reflecting the lives and experiences of lesbian, gay, bisexual, transgender and intersex LGBTI Australians. It is located in Melbourne. The Archives were established as an initiative of the 4th National Homosexual Conference, Sydney, August 1978, drawing on the previous work of founding President Graham Carbery. Since its establishment the collection has grown to over 200,000 items (500 shelf metres), constituting the largest and most significant collection of material relating to LGBT Australians and the largest collection of LGBT material in Australia, and the most prominent research centre for gay, lesbian, bisexual, trans and intersex history in Australia.

== Collection ==
AQuA's collection includes a broad range of library, archive, museum and gallery material, including personal papers and organisational records, periodicals, books, posters, photographs, audio-visual (Betamax, VHS, 8mm film, DVD, etc.), sound recordings (oral history, radio programs, conference speeches events, etc.), newspaper clippings, theses, articles and pamphlets, ephemera (e.g. flyers, circulars, invitations, cards, calendars, etc.), badges, T-shirts, banners, objects, born digital objects, etc.

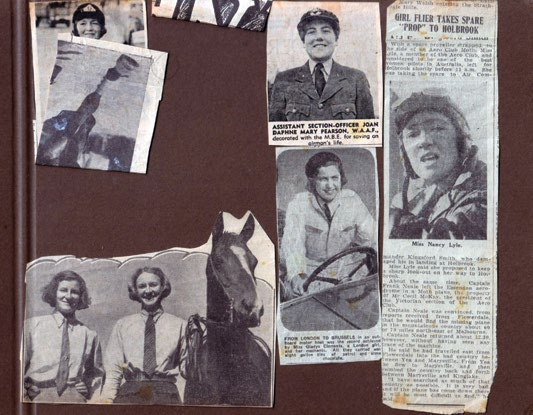
A page from Monte Punshon's scrapbooks covering 1923-1950

The collection is strongest in holdings relating to the early gay liberation movement in Australian onwards (i.e. 1970–); however, the collection also includes earlier items such as a book of love poetry between two men from World War I and Monte Punshon's scrapbooks from the 1920s–1930s.

AQuA has also built up extensive collections relating to key aspects of LGBTI life in Australia, including: pride festivals such as Sydney Gay and Lesbian Mardi Gras, Midsumma and Feast Festival; HIV/AIDS education and activism; faith-based organisations in particular Christian groups and support groups; sporting organisations and events in particular Gay Games; leather, kink and BDSM.

AQuA also holds the largest collection of non-Australian LGBTIQ+ material in Australia, including material from the United States, England, Japan, China, Thailand, Indonesia, Vanuatu, Denmark, Sweden and New Zealand.

=== Personal papers and organisational records ===
The Archives' collection of over 300 archival collections includes many notable holdings, including the organisational records of the Daughters of Bilitis/Australasian Lesbian Movement; (the first LGBT rights organisation in Australia) the Records of Society Five (Melbourne's first ongoing gay rights organisation); CAMP South Australia; Adelaide Homosexual Alliance; the Records of the National Homosexual Conferences of the 1970s and 1980s; the Records of the Homosexual Law Reform Coalition (1975–1980); the records of publishers such as Sydney Star Observer, Wicked Women, OutRage, Gay Community News, Gayzette, BlackWattle Press, Sydney Gay Writers Collective, etc.; the records of religious groups such as Christ's Community Church, Uniting Network, Metropolitan Community Church, Acceptance, etc.

The Archives also holds substantial collections of personal papers, including: entrepreneur Jan Hillier; HIV/AIDS activists and community workers Ian Goller and Bill Hathaway; academics Professor Dennis Altman; performers Noel Tovey; writers Bob Buckley, Dino Hodge, Sasha Soldatow, Lyn Palmer, and Barry Lowe; gay liberation activists such as Peter McEwan, John Langworthy, Chris Johnston, and Mother Boats (Brian Traynor); transgender activists and performers such as Roberta Perkins, Jasper Laybutt, Rose Jackson, Bobbie Nugent, Linda Phillips, etc.; DJ's Stephen Allkins and Bill Morley; artists Eddy Hackenberg, Cayte Latta, Peter Tully; motor, leather and BDSM club records (e.g. Dolphin Motor Club, Cruisers MC, Dykes on Bikes Melbourne, Wicked Women, Sydney Leather Pride Association, etc.) and personal papers of leathermen and leatherwomen such as Ken Hocking, Colin Simson, Noel Lewington, Roger Mann, Jasper Laybutt, Talisa Tulip, Gigi Legenhausen, etc.

=== Periodicals ===
The Archives holds more than 2100 titles (approximately 50,000 items), from community newspapers and magazines, to organisational newsletters and zines from across Australia, New Zealand, USA, UK, Indonesia, the Netherlands, Belgium, Denmark, France, Switzerland, Sweden, Japan, Thailand etc. Approximately 25 titles have been indexed in whole or in part, amounting to over 14,000 article references. International holdings are particularly strong in 1970s–1980s activism, leather/BDSM, and pornography.

=== Photographs ===
Amongst the over 40,000 photographic items, notable special collections include those of Tommy McDermott and Robert Albert (Lottie) Lott and Brian Cooke documenting camp life in Melbourne from the 1940s to the 1960s; photographer collections including those by John Storey, C.Moore Hardy, Cayte Latta, William Yang and Terrence (Terry) Bell, and John Jenner documenting LGBT life in Sydney from the 1970s–2000s; Eddy Hackenberg, Sydney-based artist and documentary photographer; Bob Buckley, S/M writer, documenting S/M and leather culture in Australia and around the world; David Johnstone, documenting Mandala gay commune and the early Radical Faeries in Australia; Ulo Klemmer, documenting saunas and beats in Sydney; organisational photographic collections, such as those of Midsumma and ALSO Foundation; and photographic collections from LGBT newspapers, including Campaign, Brother Sister, B-News (Bill Calder), Melbourne Star Observer, City Rhythm (Jay Watchorn and Leigh Klooger), and Klick (Ivan Polson), and Evolution Publishing (Melbourne Office), as well as a range of smaller collections of photographs in personal papers.

=== Books ===
The Archives holds approximately 7000 books, with a focus on LGBT-related books published in Australia or by Australian authors. Non-Australian historiographical books are also collected as well as pre-1980 LGBT-related books, particularly those that were distributed or circulated in Australia. The Archives also holds a number of special 'formed' book collections, the Ardy Tibby Collection of Lesbian Fiction, the David McDiarmid Collection, the Ken Hocking Collection (leather subculture, BDSM, erotica), Colin Simpson (gay pulp, leather subculture, BDSM and erotica – Tom of Finland, Sean, Rex etc.) and Barry Lowe Collections (gay literature, film, biography, comics and erotica). The Rare Books Collection holds items dating from the mid-19th century as well as association copies and artists' books.

=== Posters ===
The Archives holds over 5,000 posters dating from the 1960s to the present. Posters cover a range of subject matter from dance parties to protests, HIV/AIDS education to LGBT pride festivals, as well as smaller holdings of posters on 'allied movements' such as women's and black liberation. Notable holdings include extensive material relating to the Sydney Mardi Gras, Feast Festival and Midsumma, including a comprehensive collection of posters from each festival as well as posters for protests surrounding the arrests of the first Mardi Gras in 1978. A number of special poster collections are held by the Archives, including the Ian Malloy Collection, documenting HIV/AIDS education and gay and lesbian protests; the Victorian AIDS Council (VAC), AIDS Council of SA (ACSA), Melbourne Sexual Health Centre (MSHC), Dennis Altman, and Mandy Martin Collections, documenting HIV/AIDS education in Australia and internationally; the Les Smith Collection, documenting his Brisbane-based DJ career; the Beige Design (Chris Orr and Paul Clifton) Collection, documenting their Melbourne-based design practice for the LGBT community; the David McDiarmid Collection, documenting his poster designs from 1972 onwards; the Grant Kilby Collection, which contains leather posters as well as original poster designed by Allan Booth; the Ron Muncaster and Ken Hocking Collections documenting leather and S/M events; venue collections from the Laird Hotel, Oxford Hotel, Stonewall Hotel, Midnight Shift, Options Nightclub, Mandate etc. Also amongst the collection are a large number are a number of posters printed and designed at community print workshops in the 1970s and 1980s, including posters produced at Earthworks Poster Collective, Redback Graphix, Redletter Press, Megalo Access Arts (Megalo Print Studio), Harridan Posters etc.

=== Oral history and audio ===
The Archives' oral history and audio collections are extensive and include over 310 oral history recordings, over 1500 audio recordings from Australian LGBT radio programs and LGBT subjects on mainstream radio, and over 100 unpublished sound recordings including mixtapes and recordings of DJ sets, and over 50 published music recordings relating to LGBT music.

The Oral History Collection documents the breadth of Australian LGBT life from across Australia, documenting early camp life from pre-WW2, the development of the gay liberation movement and later LGBT organisations and community activism. The collection has a strengths in documenting gay liberation and activists, but also holds a wealth of stories of everyday lesbians, gay men and trans men and women. Special collections include the John Lee Collection, which includes 34 oral history interviews recorded between 1978 and 1980, documenting camp life in Adelaide, SA, which includes 9 interviews with recollections from pre-WW2; the Dino Hodge Collection, which includes 19 recordings created in preparing his 1996 book The fall upward: spirituality in the lives of lesbian women and gay men; the Jim Wafer Collection, which includes interviews recorded for the Hunter Gay and Lesbian Bicentennial History Project in 1995–1996; and the Australian Leather Women's History Project, documenting women in the Australian leather and BDSM community.

The Archives also holds over 1500 audio recordings relating to gay and lesbian radio programmes, such as Gaywaves (Radio 2SER, Sydney); Gay Radio Information News Service (GRINS), recorded at Radio 2SER, but distributed nationally; Gay Liberation Radio Collective (Radio 3CR, Melbourne); Gay Viewpoint (ACT Gay Liberation, 2XX Canberra); JOY 94.9, etc. Supplementing the audio recordings are a number of archival collections relating to gay radio programs, including Gaywaves, GRINS, and Inside Out (Radio 2RSR, Sydney), as well as the personal papers of members of program collectives, such as Sheril Berkovitch (Gay Liberation Radio Collective). Also included are a small number of off-air recordings of interviews relating to LGBT-subjects on mainstream radio programs.

The collection of about 100 mixtapes and DJ sets consists largely of recordings by DJ Stephen Allkins (Love Tattoo) and Bill Morley, with some recordings by David McDiarmid.

=== Ephemera ===
Ephemera consists largely of small printed paper items, most of which were not intended to have a long life, such as brochures, flyers, postcards, circulars, as well as health promotion materials such as condoms etc. The Archives' Ephemera Collection comprises over 2000 files, largely by organisation/publisher, with a smaller number of people or subject files. Substantial holdings include events such as the Sydney Gay and Lesbian Mardi Gras, Midsumma and Feast Festival; as well as conferences such as Queer Collaborations; venues such as nightclubs; and theatre programs.

=== Newspaper clippings ===
The Newspaper Clippings collection contains ~50,000 clippings (12 shelf metres), covering Australian metropolitan dailies and regional and suburban newspapers. Between c.1975 and 2000 the Collection was developed with the support of OutRage magazine and Fr Ken Sinclair, who utilised press clippings services and subsequently donated clippings to the Archives. Additional clippings, particularly those from before 1982 have been actively copied from the national and state libraries. The Collection has been photocopied onto paper and is sorted chronologically into binders. While the collection has not been fully indexed, approximately 9,500 articles have been indexed to date. Additional print indexes are available, including: "Editorials in Australian newspapers related to homosexuality"; and Robert French's two indexes, Gays between the broadsheets: Australian media references on homosexuality, 1948–1980 (Sydney, NSW: Gay History Project, 1986) and Mossies could spread AIDS: Australian media references on AIDS, 1981 – 1985 (Sydney, NSW: Gay History Project, 1986). A number of collections of personal papers also contain subject-based newspaper clippings files, including those of Geoff Allshorn and Graham Willett.

=== Audio-visual ===
The Archives maintains a substantial collection of audio-visual material in a range of formats, from Super8 to Umatic and VHS, including feature films, documentaries, safe sex/sex education videos, daytime talk shows, news reportage, and original recordings of community events. Holdings include The Set (Australia, prod. Frank Brittain, 1969) – the first 'gay' movie to be made in Australia; and five episodes of Number 96 (Australia, 1972–1977) – Australia's first soap, and the first to feature a gay character. Notable special collections include the Colin Billing Collection, containing original video recordings of Melbourne LGBT community events such as those by Midsumma and The ALSO Foundation.

=== Artwork ===
The Archives' collection of artwork consists largely of photographs, collages and paintings, as well as original poster and costume designs, cartoons and comics. Poster and flyer designs include works by designers such as Mark Lyndon Matheson, Allan Booth and David McDiarmid. Cartoons and comics include works by Kenton Penley / Kenton Miller, Brett Willis, David Pope, John Ditchburn (Inkcinct) and Ian Sharpe. Special collections include the Frank and Leonie Osowski Collection of fetish-related artwork; the Papers of Andi Nellssun containing photographic and collage works; the Papers of Bill Morley containing sketchbooks, drawings and collage works; the Papers of Eddy Hackenberg and Cayte Latta containing photographic, collage and film works; the Papers of Stephen Allkins containing jewellery by Peter Tully, costumes by David McDiarmid, and artwork by Bill Morley and Tony Guthrie; the Papers of Jeffrey Stewart include sketches and designs by Allan Booth; the Barry Lowe Collection includes works by Garrie Maguire, Diablo Mode etc.; the Ken's of Kensington Collection contains four photograph collages by John Jenner; the David McDiarmid Collection includes an artist book and print portfolio; leather and S/M artwork, including original sketches by Bill Ward, are located in the Ron Muncaster and Ken Hocking Collections; the David Beschi Collection includes an original watercolour etc.

=== Badges ===
The Archives holds approximately 1000 badges dating from the late 1960s to the present. The badges are largely Australian, but with notable holdings of badges produced in America and New Zealand. While the majority of badges have been integrated into the general collection, some personal collections have been kept intact, including those of key activists as well as collections such as those of Noel Lewington, covering Australian, American and European motor bike clubs.

=== T-shirts ===
The Archives holds over 700 T-shirts dating from the early 1970s gay liberation period to the present. The T-shirts are largely Australian, but with some T-shirts produced in America and England.

=== Costumes ===
The Archives holds a small collection of costumes, including drag outfits from the late 1960s to the 1990s (including a radical drag outfit worn by activist Ken Davis in the 1978 Mardi Gras, and one worn by Miss New Zealand during the 1990s); a leather/punk jacket created by Marcus Bunyan; and jackets and overlays worn by various motor clubs during the 1970s–1990s, including the South Pacific Motor Club (SPMC), Griffin's Motor Club, Dolphin's Motor Club etc.

=== Banners ===
The Archives holds approximately 100 banners, documenting LGBT activism and community organisations from the late 1970s through to 2013, with banners from Victoria, Queensland and New South Wales.

== Programs ==
=== Queer Youth Education Project ===
The Queer Youth Education Project was established to provide workshops about Australian queer history to youth groups and school groups based on the Archives' collection. The Project also takes archival collection material out of the Archives for workshops for youth services and schools.

=== Venues Project ===
The Venues Project seeks to photographically document LGBT venues across Australia. Venues documented include Mandate Nightclub, Xchange Nightclub and the Market Hotel in Melbourne, and Ken's of Kensington, Kingsteam Sauna and Aarows Sauna in Sydney. Additional venues are documented progressively, with priority given to those that are being renovated or closed.

== Events ==
AQuA undertakes a range of activities and events, including stalls at various pride festival fair days around Australia, Queer History Walks, in particular during Melbourne's annual Midsumma gay and lesbian festival; the annual Homosexual Histories Conference; the annual honours thesis prize; regular Open Days; and exhibitions.

== Exhibitions ==
AQuA has an increasingly active exhibition program, developing exhibitions both in-house, as well as contributing loans and expertise to exhibitions around Australia, in-house exhibitions including:

- Forbidden love, bold passions: an exhibition of lesbian stories 1900s to 1990s (1996) – touring exhibition curated by History Inverted and the Australian Queer Archives
- Significant moments (2001), developed by the Australian Lesbian and Gay Archives with support from Pride March
- Camp as: Melbourne in the 1950s (2005), City Gallery, Melbourne Town Hall
- Sydney Mardi Gras Museum exhibition (2013), Sydney – funded by the Sydney Gay and Lesbian Mardi Gras
- Passion: 30 years of safe sex (2013), Victorian Archives Centre, Melbourne
- Gay times are here again (2013), State Library of South Australia – celebrating the 40th anniversary of the 1973 Adelaide Gay Pride Week
- Out of the closets, into the streets: gay liberation photography 1971–73 (2014), Melbourne
- Vital signs: interpreting the Archives 9–26 July 2014, Blindside Gallery, Melbourne Vic
- Out of the closets, into the streets: histories of Melbourne Gay Liberation, City Library Gallery, Melbourne, January–February 2015
- Unfinished journey: law and justice for LGBTIQ people in Victoria 1835–2016, Queen's Hall, Level 1, Parliament House, 23–26 May 2016; Victoria Legal Aid Public Law Library, 11–25 July 2016; Northcote Library, 24 October-6 November 2016; Preston Library, 7–20 November 2016; Fairfield Library, 21 November-4 December 2016; Fitzroy Library, 2–13 April 2017.
- Serving in Silence? Australian LGBTI Military Service since WWII, Melbourne City Library, 15–29 January 2018.
- WE ARE HERE: contemporary artists explore their queer cultural heritage (co-hosted with the State Library of Victoria, State Library of Victoria, 19 January 2018 – 1 April 2018.

Exhibitions featuring notable contributions from AQuA include:

- Got the message? 50 years of political posters (2013), Art Gallery of Ballarat
- Protest! Archives from the University of Melbourne (2013), Leigh Scott Gallery, Baillieu Library, University of Melbourne
- Radicalism (2014), The Substation, Melbourne – An exploration of radicalism, resistance and defiance around questions of gender and sexuality
- David McDiarmid: when this you see remember me (2014), The Ian Potter Centre: NGV Australia at Federation Square, 9 May-31 August 2014
- TRANSMISSIONS: archiving HIV/AIDS – Melbourne, 1979–2014 (2014), George Paton Gallery, University of Melbourne
- Bohemian Melbourne, State Library of Victoria (2014–2015)
- The Docks: Melbourne's Cultural Underground of the 90s, The Gallery, Library at The Dock, Melbourne, 13 November 2015 – 28 February 2016
- Challenging Dewey: Classification and equality, City Library Gallery, Melbourne, 13 January 2016 – 27 February 2016
- If People Powered Radio: 40 Years of 3CR, Gertrude Contemporary, 200 Gertrude St, Fitzroy, Melbourne, 18 March–23 April 2016
- Memories of the Struggle – Australians Against Apartheid, Museum of Australian Democracy at Old Parliament House, Canberra, 27 April-[TBC] 2016; Constitutional Hill, Johannesburg, South Africa, 2017.

== Publishing ==
In addition to AQuA's irregular Bulletin, previously titled the ALGA Newsletter, AQuA has published a number of books and has edited a number of monographs in series, these include:

- Intimacy, violence and activism : gay and lesbian perspectives on Australian history and society (Gay and lesbian perspectives; 7) / edited by Graham Willett and Yorick Smaal (Clayton, Victoria Monash University Publishing, 2013) – based on AQuA's 12th Australia's Homosexual Histories Conference, Brisbane, 2012
- After homosexual : the legacies of gay liberation / edited by Carolyn D'Cruz and Mark Pendleton (Crawley, W.A. Uwa Publishing, 2013) – based on the joint AQuA and La Trobe University conference of the same name, held at Victoria University in 2012
- Secret histories of queer Melbourne / edited by Graham Willett, Wayne Murdoch and Daniel Marshall (Melbourne, Vic: Australian Lesbian and Gay Archives, 2011)
- Out here : gay and lesbian perspectives VI / edited by Yorick Smaal and Graham Willett (Melbourne, Vic: Monash University Publishing, 2011)
- 'Queen City of the South : gay and lesbian Melbourne'; La Trobe journal; no. 87 / edited by Graham Willett and John Arnold (Melbourne, Vic : State Library of Victoria Foundation, 2011)
- The travelling mind of Val Eastwood / by Val Eastwood (Melbourne, Vic: Australian Lesbian and Gay Archives, 2009)
- A guide to gay and lesbian writing in Australia / by Michael Hurley (St. Leonards, N.S.W. : Allen & Unwin and Australian Lesbian and Gay Archives, 1996)
- A history of the Sydney Gay and Lesbian Mardi Gras / by Graham Carbery (Melbourne, Vic : Australian Lesbian and Gay Archives, 1995)

AQuA has also been used as a key research facility for almost every LGBT historical work published in Australia.
