= Brigidine Sisters =

Roman Catholic religious congregation for women

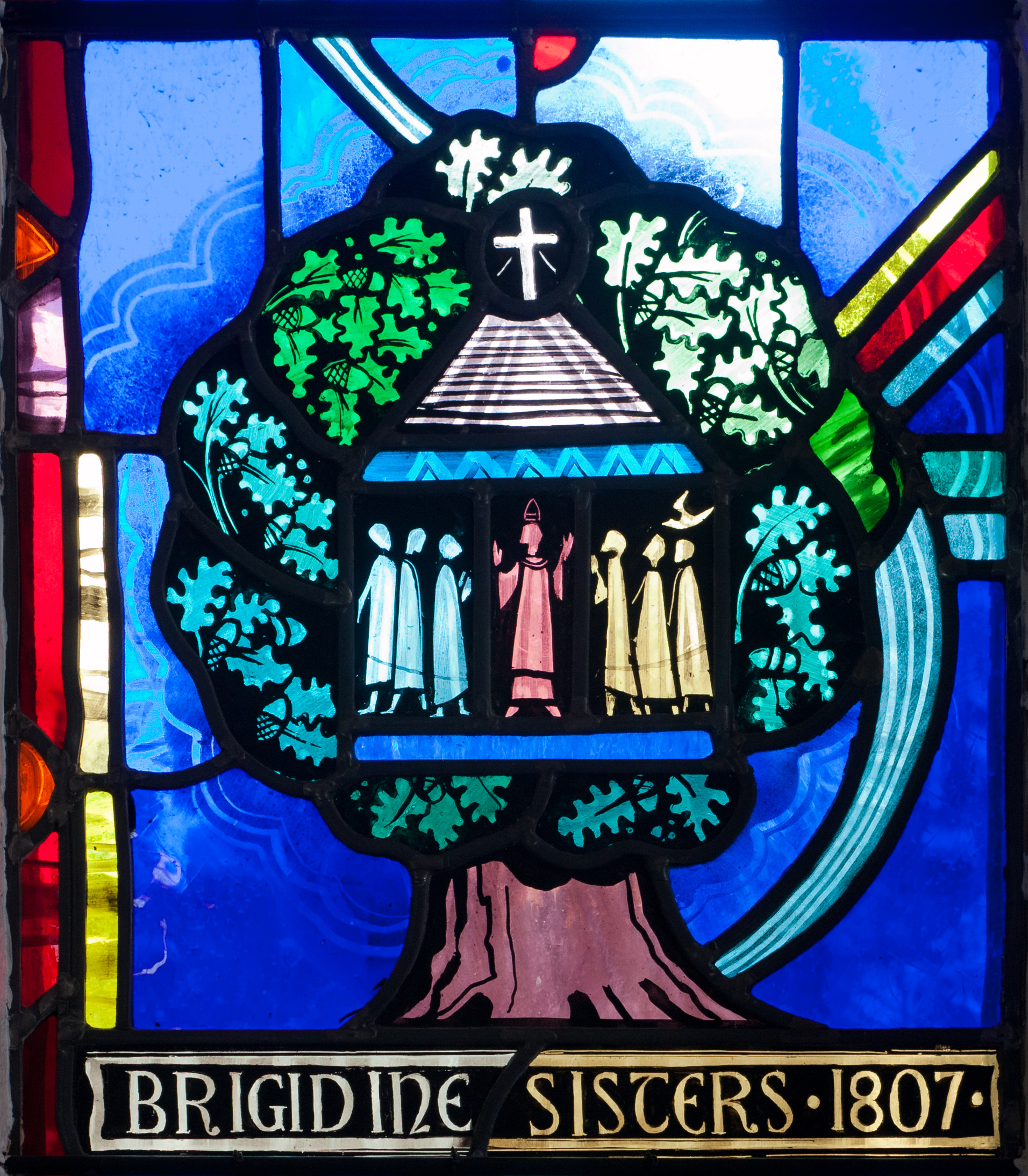
- Stained glass window by George Walsh depicting the six founding Brigidine Sisters with Bishop Delany in the garden at their convent in Tullow
- Abbreviation: C.S.B.
- Formation: c. AD 1807; 219 years ago
- Founder: Daniel Delany
- Type: Catholic religious order
- Headquarters: Coonamble New South Wales
- Website: brigidine.org.au

Brigidine cross

The Brigidine Sisters (also known as the Brigidine Order, or simply the Brigidines) are a global Roman Catholic congregation, founded by Bishop Daniel Delany in Tullow, Ireland on 1 February 1807. The sisters' apostolate is education.

== Background ==
In 1783, Daniel Delany, coadjutor to James Keeffe, Bishop of Kildare and Leighlin, established at Tullow, the Confraternity of the Blessed Sacrament. Two years later, he founded the Confraternity of Christian Doctrine. In 1788, Delany succeeded Keeffe as Bishop of Kildare and Leighlin. Keenly aware of the lamentable state to which religion had been reduced by the Penal Laws, he sought to remedy the situation by applying himself to secure the proper observance of the Lord's Day, and the religious instruction of the children and adult women of his parish and diocese. To inaugurate his work there he formed catechism and reading classes to be held in the church on Sundays, and drew his catechists from the two confraternities.

Delany traveled to Cork to invite the Presentation Sisters to his diocese, but they had no sisters to spare.

== History ==
The Institute of the Brigidines was established by Daniel Delaney, Bishop of Kildare and Leighlin, at Tullow, County Carlow, Ireland, in 1807. An earlier congregation linked to Saint Brigid had been founded in the fifth century AD, and had lasted until the Reformation; Bishop Delany considered the establishment of this new congregation to be merely a refounding of the original one. In order to demonstrate this continuity, he brought an oak sapling with him from Kildare and planted it in the grounds of the new convent in Tullow, County Carlow.

The sisters were: Eleanor Tallon, Margaret Kinsella, Eleanor Dawson, Judith Whelan, Bridget Brien and Catherine Doyle. Bishop Delany allowed them to make vows, and thus laid the foundation of the Brigidine Institute, one of the first of the kind founded in Ireland since the Reformation. Delany gave them a rule based on that of St. Augustine.

The sisters immediately opened schools for the poorer and higher classes of children in the neighbourhood. This work proving successful, a building was erected for the accommodation of boarders who presented themselves, but who had until then to lodge in the town. Soon many came to avail themselves of the advantages of religious and secular education afforded by the Brigidine Sisters.

In April 1809, he sent three of the sisters from the mother house at Tullow to Mountrath in County Laois, where they founded a convent. The sisters were employed in education. The Brigidine Convent school closed in June 2009. In September 2009 it amalgamated with nearby Patrician College Ballyfin to form Mountrath Community School. In 1824, the sisters began a button factory in Tullow to raise the funds for a new school building.

In 1842, another house was established in Abbeyleix, also in County Laois. Then, in 1858 a layman in Goresbridge, County Kilkenny offered to help finance a foundation in his parish. The Paulstown foundation soon followed. The Sisters came to the village of Ballyroan in 1877. Three sisters from the Abbeyleix Community took up residence in their newly built convent on 25 September of that year. The convent and school closed in 1974.

In 1883, in answer to a request from a bishop in New South Wales, six sisters from Mountrath went to Australia. They founded their first establishment in Coonamble, New South Wales. From there branches quickly spread to the dioceses of Sydney, Bathurst, Canberra-Goulburn, Perth and Brisbane as well as to the Archdiocese of Wellington, New Zealand, in 1898.

The institute, although several times approved by the Holy See, continued a diocesan congregation until 1892, when Pope Leo XIII, on being solicited to place all the houses of the institute under a mother-general, issued a Decree approving of change in government for five years by way of experiment, and in 1907 Pope Pius X confirmed, in perpetuity, the constitution of the new regime. In 1923 it was opened the first house of the New Brigidine Order in Djursholm, near Stockholm.

The Sisters returned to the British Isles and founded the first two convents in the UK: St Brigid's School (1939) in Denbigh, Wales and Brigidine Convent (1948) in Windsor, England.

The archive of the Brigidine Sisters is stored in the Delany Archive in Carlow College.

== Mission and ethos ==
The Brigidine motto is Fortiter et Suaviter, which is Latin for "Strength and Kindliness". Its mission is the education and evangelisation of youth.

== Schools ==
=== Australia ===
New South Wales

- Brigidine College, Randwick
- Brigidine College, St Ives

Queensland

- Brigidine College, Indooroopilly

South Australia

- Kildare College

Victoria

- Clonard College
- Kilbreda College
- Kildare College, Malvern (closed)
- Killester College
- Kilmaire Ladies' College, Riversdale Road, Hawthorn (closed)
- Marian College, Ararat
- Marian College, Sunshine West
- St Augustine's College, Kyabram
- St Joseph's College, Echuca

Western Australia

- Brigidine College, Floreat (absorbed by Newman College)

=== New Zealand ===
- St Bride's College for Girls (merged to become Chanel College, Masterton)

=== United Kingdom ===
- Brigidine School (closed 31 January 2019)
- St Brigid's School

== Notable sisters ==
- Mary Synan
- Johanna Barron
- Brigid Arthur
- Mary Gertrude Banahan

== See also ==
- List of Brigidine schools
- Catholic religious order
- List of Catholic religious institutes
