= Banahan =

Banahan is a surname. Notable people with the surname include:

- Matt Banahan (born 1986), rugby union player
- Mary Gertrude Banahan (c. 1856–1932), New Zealand catholic nun
