= Punshon =

Punshon is a surname, found in Australia and the UK. Notable people with this surname include:

- Arthur Punshon (1891–1955), Australian rules football player
- E. R. Punshon (1872–1956), English novelist
- Monte Punshon (1882–1989), Australian artist and teacher
- William Morley Punshon (1824 – 1881), English Methodist preacher
