= Sarah Stephens =

Australian model and actress (born 1990)

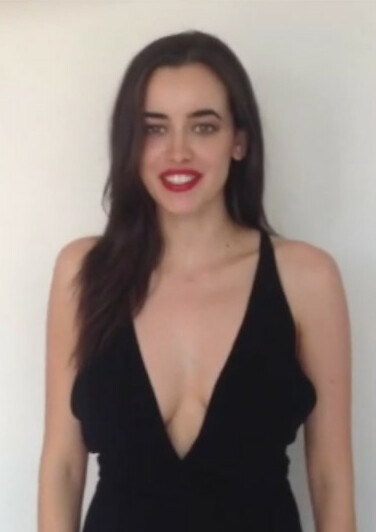
- Stephens in April 2014
- Born: Sarah Elizabeth Stephens; 7 June 1990 (age 36); Lancashire, England
- Modeling information
- Height: 1.78 m (5 ft 10 in)
- Hair color: Brown
- Eye color: Hazel
- Agency: Women / 360 (New York); Next Model Management (Milan); Premier Model Management (London); Iconic Management (Berlin); Chic Management (Sydney)

Sarah Elizabeth Stephens (born 7 June 1990) is an Australian model and actress, best known for winning Girlfriend magazine's Model Search 2006 and walking in the 2008 Victoria's Secret Fashion Show at the age of 18.

== Early life ==
Stephens was born in Lancashire, England. Her parents are Australian and she has three younger brothers. She grew up in Sydney and attended Wahroonga Public School and Brigidine College, St Ives. She played the bass clarinet in the school band.

== Career ==
In 2006, at the age of 16, Stephens won the nationwide Girlfriend Magazine Model search.

As the winner of Girlfriend magazine's Model Search, Stephens won a two-year contract with Chic Model Management and was later signed by Next Model Management in New York and Paris. Stephens has been on the covers of many magazines including Russh Australia, Frankie magazine, Madison, GQ, French Revue de Modes, and Eurowoman. She has been featured in editorial spreads in Italian, Russian, Japanese, and Australian editions of Vogue, as well as Numéro France, Numéro Tokyo, Interview, Nylon, Madison, Italian Amica, 10 magazine (UK), Above magazine (UK), Lula (UK), Muse (UK), Vs. magazine, Harper's Bazaar (Australia), Harper's Bazaar (en Español), Exit magazine, Karen magazine, Oyster magazine and Vogue Gioiello (Italy). Stephens has also been featured in global advertising campaigns for Lacoste, Benetton, Diesel, Sephora, Alice Temperley, Forever 21, NastyGal, Nordstrom, Neiman Marcus, Minelli (France), Dynamite and Kensie, and the lingerie brands; Honey Birdette, Bras N Things, Lasenza, Agent Provocateur, and Myla. Her Australian campaign portfolio includes David Jones, Sass & bide, Bonds, Alannah Hill, L'Oréal, Pandora, Peter Alexander, Wrangler, Just Jeans, Ksubi, Levi's, Lisa Ho, Calibre menswear, Morrisey, Sportsgirl, Sunsilk, Seafolly, Tigerlily Swimwear, Witchery, and Yeojin Bae.

She walked 18 shows at her debut Australian Fashion Week in 2007. In early 2008, she met with photographer Ellen von Unwerth in Paris who shot her for editorial spreads in Russian Vogue, Above magazine and Mixte magazine. Ellen von Unwerth also shot her in 2009 for Italian Vogue and again in 2010 for Vs magazine. During a visit to New York in June 2008 she met with photographer Greg Kadel who shot editorials with Stephens for Numéro (France), Numéro Homme, and Italian Vogue. She was shot by David Sims for United Colours of Benetton's Fall/Winter 2009/2010 campaign and in 2010 she was shot by Guy Aroch for the inaugural edition of 'Untitled Project'. She has walked at several resort shows in New York including Gucci and Lanvin. She walked 14 shows at her debut New York Fashion Week in September 2008, including Jason Wu, Halston. J. Mendel and Tuleh but she is best known in the US for walking in the annual Victoria's Secret Fashion Show in Miami in 2008 a few months after her 18th birthday. Stephens was the youngest model to walk in that show. She is best known in Europe as the face of the Lacoste fragrance, "Love of Pink". She has a role in the movie Solitary Man with Michael Douglas and Danny DeVito. In 2011, she was signed as a face of the Australian swimwear label Seafolly. In 2015, she played the young witch in the horror film The Witch. In 2017 she starred in music video "The Other" by New York-based singer Lauv.

She posed nude for Playboy in the July/August issue for 2018.

Preceded by Unknown	Girlfriend Magazine Model Search winner Sarah Stephens (2006)	Succeeded by Morgan Hurst & Aimee Hurst
