= Sarah Jones (Australian journalist) =

Australian television presenter

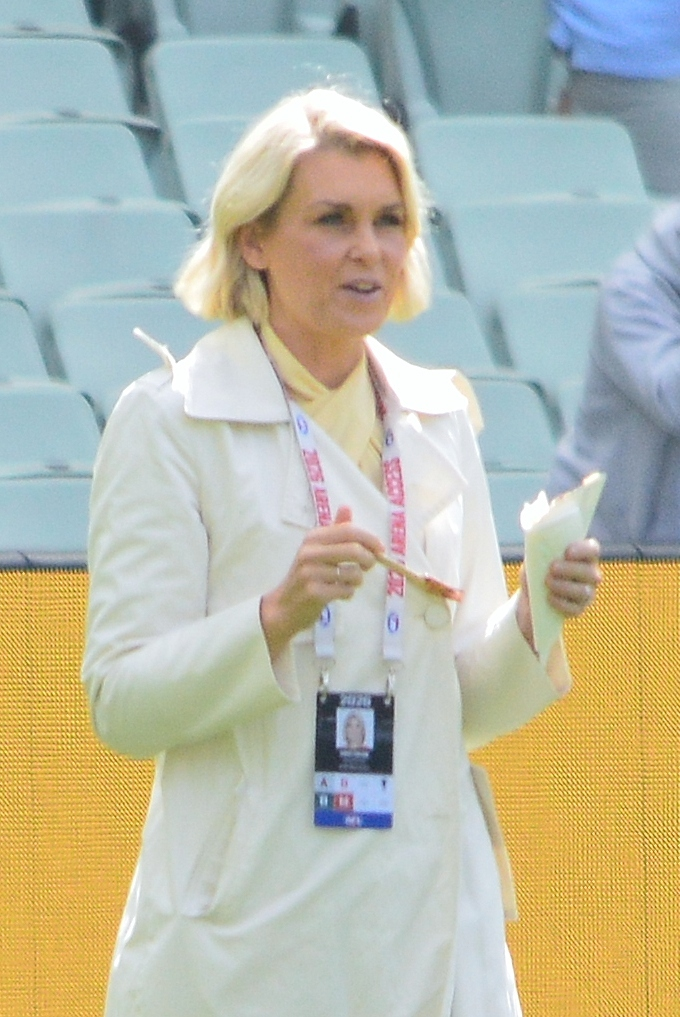
- Jones in March 2026
- Born: Sarah Jones; 24 June 1982 (age 43); Echuca, Victoria, Australia
- Education: St Joseph's College, Echuca
- Alma mater: RMIT University
- Occupations: Television presenter; sports journalist; sports broadcaster
- Years active: 2004−present
- Employer: Fox Sports
- Relatives: Jack Jones (grandfather)

Sarah Jones (born 24 June 1982) is an Australian television presenter and sports broadcaster on Fox Sports. Jones is currently a host with Fox Footy's AFL coverage and Fox Cricket's BBL coverage, after appearing on Fox Sports News as a reporter and host.

== Early life and education ==
Sarah Jones grew up in Echuca in country Victoria as one of five siblings to parents father Tony and mother Chris. In 1990, Chris was killed in a car crash; Sarah was the only child not in the car at the time, while her siblings survived and escaped.She attended secondary school at St Joseph’s College. After completing school she moved to Melbourne and started a journalism degree at RMIT University.

== Career ==
At the age of 17, Jones undertook work experience at Seven Network working a project job during the 2000 Sydney Olympics; she studied at journalism at RMIT before joining the then Fox Footy Channel in 2002 as a reporter. She became a presenter and reporter at Fox Sports News, focusing on AFL and cricket while she was also involved in Foxtel's Olympics coverage at the 2010 Vancouver Winter Olympics and 2012 London Olympics. Jones was later a reporter during Fox Sports coverage of the Big Bash.

In 2016, Jones presented AFL Tonight on Fox Sports News and later become a boundary rider in Fox Footy's AFL coverage. In June of that year, Jones filled in as studio host of Fox Thursday Night coverage after Eddie McGuire stepped down from the after he made sexist comments on radio earlier that week; Jones filled the hosting role on Thursdays for the remainder of the season.

Her roles expanded in 2018, when she hosted On The Mark with fellow female broadcasters Kelli Underwood and Neroli Meadows. Jones subsequently hosted Fox Footy's match-day coverage, mainly on Thursdays and Saturdays, and also during the AFLW while she was host during Fox Footy's Grand Final Day preview. Jones also emceed awards multiple award ceremonies, including the All-Australian awards, the AFLPA MVP, and the Australian Football Hall of Fame.

In 2018, Jones joined Fox Cricket as a host and boundary reporter during its BBL coverage after the network regained cricket rights in Australia.

== Personal life ==
Jones is a mother of two girls with husband Leigh Carlson, a producer at Fox Footy. Jones supports the Essendon Football Club, her grandfather Jack Jones having been a premiership player at the Bombers and a tour guide at the club's former headquarters at Windy Hill.
