= Juliet Shields =

(1932-1992) lawyer and public servant in the Northern Territory

Juliet Elizabeth Shields née Baxter (8 November 1932 - 11 March 1992) was an Australian lawyer and public servant who worked for the Northern Territory Government for much of her career. In 1978, when the Northern Territory was granted self government she became responsible for the commercial division of the Department of Law where she managed many of the government's major commercial transactions.

Shields was also an active member of the Darwin community and was involved in community theatre.

== Early life ==
Shields was born in West Wyalong in New South Wales and was the daughter of Bryan Leo and Mary Monica Baxter and attended school at Brigidine College Randwick where she was the dux of the school. (Note: This is also the alma mater of Ella Stack who moved to Darwin at a similar time to Shields and went on to become the Lord Mayor.) Shields then attended the University of Sydney where she completed a bachelor of laws in 1956 and, following this, was admitted to the New South Wales Bar Association.

After completing her studies Shields travelled to Europe for an extended working holiday, working as a teacher and as a research for the BBC, for the next three years. When she returned to Australia she took a position as a parliamentary draftsman for the Commonwealth Government, based in Canberra. In this role she became knowns as 'Canberra's only woman barrister'.

In Canberra Shields met and married John William Shields, a geologist, on 12 December 1959. They moved together to Darwin, in the Northern Territory, in 1961 where they initially planned to stay two years.

== Life in the Northern Territory ==
In Darwin Shields took a job with the Crown Law Office. There, on 17 October 1963, their child Alistair was born and Shields took a break from the workforce until 1974 when she joined the Northern Territory Administration of the Commonwealth Public Service. She was employed initially as a clerk and then in the conveyancing section.

In December 1974 Shields' home suffered significant damage in Cyclone Tracy but, with it remaining habitable, she and John were able to remain in Darwin and assist others; Alistair, however, was evacuated for a period of time. Land buybacks after the cyclone also became a major part of Shields role in the following years.

She rose quickly within the department as soon became one of the first female sections heads and, following the granting of self government in 1974, led the commercial division of the Department of Law and was, at times, the Crown Conveyancer and the acting Registrar General. In this role Shields a key advisor to the government in relation to land dealings. She was also a member of the Agents Licensing Board from its establishment in 1979 and was its chairperson from 1985–1988.

In addition to her work, Shields was also an active member of the Darwin community and was involved in the Darwin Theatre Group and the National Trust. She was praised as an actress and also produced plays performed at Brown's Mart.

Shields died on 11 March 1992 at home in Stuart Park. Following her death she was honoured in Northern Territory Parliament by Daryl Manzie, the then Attorney-General, where she was noted for her professional ethics and called a "kind and committed human being". Following this Max Ortmann also praised her as a lawyer, a mother and "a fine example to women in the Northern Territory".

== Legacy ==
Juliet Shields Park, in the Darwin suburb of Muirhead is named for her.
