= Kaliber =

Kaliber may refer to:

- Kaliber (product), a low-alcohol pale lager from Guinness Brewery. See Guinness Brewery#Products
- Kaliber (band), Danish rap band
- Kaliber, a stage name used by Swedish DJ and producer John Dahlbäck
  - Pepp & Kaliber, musical collaborative duo between John Dahlbäck and Jesper Dahlbäck
- Kaliber 44, Polish hip hop band

== Others ==
- X-Kaliber 2097, released as Sword Maniac in Japan, a Super NES action video game published by Activision
- Royal Kaliber, a horse that competed at the Grand Prix level of show jumping, and was part of the United States Show Jumping Team at the 2004 Athens Olympic Games
- 3M-54 Kalibr, a family of Russian cruise missiles

== See also ==
- Caliber (disambiguation)
