= Renae Ryan =

Australian neuroscientist

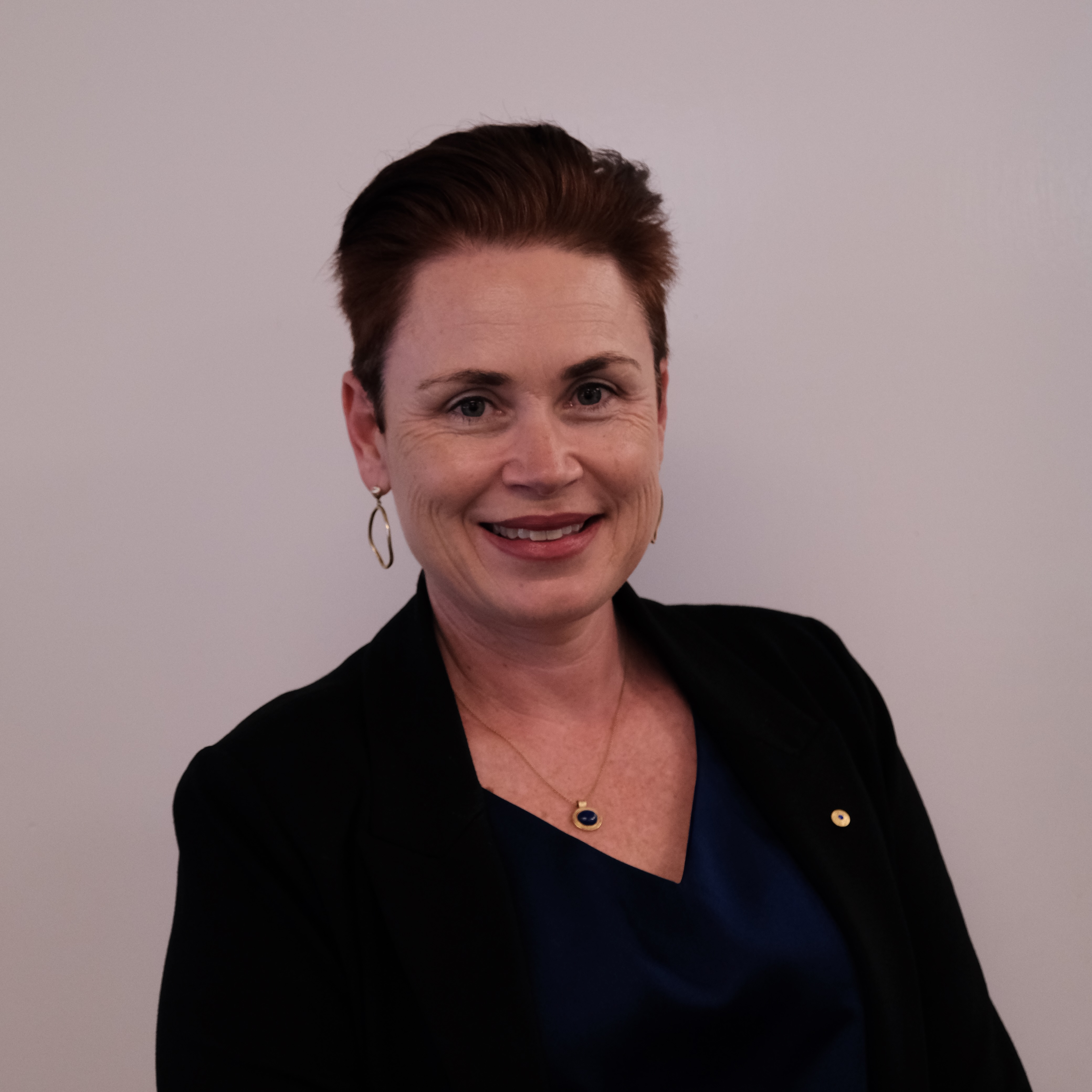
- Ryan in May 2024
- Education: University of Sydney
- Awards: Member of the Order of Australia (AM), 2023; Eureka Prize for Outstanding Mentor of Young Researchers, 2023
- Scientific career
- Workplaces: University of Sydney
- Thesis: Molecular determinants for transport and ion channel functions of a human glutamate transporter (2004)

Renae Monique Ryan AM is the academic director of the Science in Australia Gender Equity (SAGE) Program at the University of Sydney, and a researcher in neuroscience, pharmacology, and membrane transport proteins. She argues for systemic change to increase academic diversity.

== Early life and education ==
Ryan was born and grew up in Sydney's eastern suburbs where she attended Brigidine College Randwick. She obtained her PhD from the University of Sydney in 2004.

== Career ==
She worked as a postdoctoral fellow in Columbia University and also the National Institutes of Health in the USA. Ryan returned to the University of Sydney, where she was appointed in 2010 as an associate professor within the Sydney Medical School.

Ryan uses structural biology and biophysical techniques to investigate molecular pumps that transport amino acids and neurotransmitters into cells. Her work involves designing novel compounds that target these pumps, and this may be used to treat diseases including chronic pain, cancer and neurological diseases.

=== Scientific impact ===
In addition to her work in neurochemistry and pharmacology, she has worked in gender equity, diversity, and inclusion. The scientific impact of her research, as measured using citations and H number, included over 1,700 citations and an H number of 19 in July 2019, increasing to more than 2,900 and H-index of 29 by August 2023. Ryan has had two articles published in Nature and Nature Structural and Molecular Biology in 2007.

=== Work in equity ===
As a student, she did not think about gender very much, given that in biomedical science, there "seemed to be lots of women around". As she rose through the academic ranks, she noticed that "despite high numbers of women at undergraduate and PhD levels, there were very few women in senior academic positions". Ryan's work on gender equity has been published by Women's Agenda.

Ryan works as a mentor. She believes that to increase diversity in academia, we should not change the person, but "we need disruptive systemic change".

== Recognition and awards ==
- University of Technology Sydney's Eureka Prize for Outstanding Mentor of Young Researchers (2023)
- Member of the Order of Australia for her "significant service to biomedical science as a researcher, and to diversity and inclusion" (2023)
- Nancy Mills Medal for Women in Science, Australian Academy of Science (2023)
- Women's Agenda Leadership Awards finalist (2018)
- JA Young Medal, Sydney Medical School (2017)
- Outstanding Mentoring and Leadership, Sydney Medical School Excellence Award (2017)
- NSW Tall Poppy Award, Australian Institute of Policy and Science (2012)
- AK McIntyre Prize, Australian Physiological Society (2010)
- Young Investigator Award, Lorne Protein Conference (2008)
- Dennis Wade Johnson & Johnson New Investigator Award, Australasian Society of Clinical and Experimental Pharmacology and Toxicology (2007)
- Barbara Ell Lecturer, Victor Chang Cardiac Research Institute (2007)
- Rebecca Cooper Medal, Bosch Institute (2007)
- Best Postdoctoral Publication Prize, Australian Physiological Society (2007).
