= Queensmead School Windsor =

Coordinates: 51°28′17″N 0°36′28″W

Location
- Kings Road; Windsor, Berkshire, SL4 2AX; England

Information
- Type: Private day school
- Religious affiliation: Roman Catholic
- Established: 1948
- Closed: 31 January 2019
- Local authority: Windsor and Maidenhead
- Department for Education URN: 110147 Tables
- Gender: Co-educational
- Age: 5 to 16 (Boys and Girls)
- Enrolment: 100
- Website: http://queensmeadwindsor.org.uk

Queensmead School Windsor was a Catholic non-selective private day school for boys and girls aged 5 to 16 in Windsor, Berkshire, England, located at the edge of Windsor Great Park. Despite its religious affiliation, the school accepted pupils of all faiths. The school was closed on 31 January 2019 after attempts to sell it to an overseas education provider were unsuccessful.

== History ==
The Brigidine Sisters established a convent and school at Windsor in 1948, the second such founded by the order in England and Wales. Queensmead, the Victorian bricked mansion the Sisters moved into, remained one of the school's main buildings. The school became run by lay staff but retained its Catholic ethos and religious character.

During the early 2000s, the school experienced financial difficulties; pupil and staff numbers declined and the school was threatened with closure. In 2011 parents and governors discussed a possibility of the school entering the state sector but an agreement could not be reached.

In 2012, further funding was secured and the school remained open and independent.

In 2018 it was renamed from Brigidine to Queensmead.

== Closure ==
After years of financial difficulties, the school closed permanently on 31 January 2019.

At the time of closure, the Head of Education was Simon Larter, and the Head of Business Affairs Dawn Fleming.

== Alumni ==
- Tamara Mellon, fashion designer
- Susan Sheridan, actress

== See also ==
- Catholic Church in England
