= C. Moore Hardy =

Australian photographer, nurse and community worker

- Born: Catherine Moore Hardy; 1955 (age 70–71); Sydney, New South Wales, Australia
- Known for: Documentary photography
- Spouse: Martein Coucke

C. Moore Hardy (born 1955), is an Australian photographer, nurse and community worker, known for her extensive photographic documentation of the Sydney queer community since the late 1970s. Hardy's work has encompassed both freelance and commercial photography, featuring candid portraiture of community events, most notably the Sydney Gay and Lesbian Mardi Gras, and in particular minority groups within the LGBTI community. She successfully ran Starfish Studio Photography Studio/Gallery in Clovelly, NSW for 15 years. Hardy held a major exhibition of over three decades of her documentation of Sydney's LGBTQ+ scene at the National Art School in Sydney.

== Career ==
Hardy was born in Darlinghurst in 1955, to a Lebanese father and an Irish Pharmacist mother. As a child she was given a Brownie camera by her father as a gift. Raised in a Catholic family and going to Brigidine College Randwick, High school for girls, informed her social conscience.

After studying nursing at Prince of Wales/Prince Henry Hospitals, Hardy worked part time until she set up her photographic studio (Starfish Studio) in Clovelly. She completed art school studies at National Art School, Darlinghurst: College Of Fine Arts, Paddington: & Sydney College of the Arts, University of Sydney, before setting up Starfish Studio. Studying at Sydney College of the Arts, University of Sydney (1986-?), Hardy also studied Arts Management at UTS Ultimo, as a post graduate subject, but to make ends meet she continued nursing until setting up Starfish Studio.

Hardy's involvement in a broad range of social causes from the late 1970s, saw her start to photograph those movements, she later noted:

“I was involved in all kinds of politics from those days – women’s rights, animal rights, anti-nuclear, conservation, our natural heritage, gay and lesbian rights. I care deeply about the society I live in.”

In July 1979 Hardy's work was featured on the cover of the first edition of the gay and lesbian community newspaper the Star Observer. Working for the Star Observer Hardy became increasingly involved in the gay and lesbian community, and from the mid-1980s this significantly expanded with the increasing popularity and expansion of the Sydney Gay and Lesbian Mardi Gras, which became a key focus of her work documenting in the community. She was also drawn to minorities within the LGBTI community – trans* people, Indigenous community members and lesbians – who weren't being as avidly captured by other documentary photographers as gay men.

From the 1980s to the 2010s Hardy combined her community and professional photographic practice with her work as a Registered Nurse and Clinical Coordinator, including roles at the (Prince of Wales Hospital (Sydney), Prince Henry Hospital, Royal Prince Alfred Hospital, and St Vincent's Hospital. Her community photographic practice extended to voluntary cultural development positions for lesbian and gay community groups, including the Sydney Gay and Lesbian Mardi Gras, NSW Gay and Lesbian Rights Lobby, Sydney Pride Centre, AIDS Council of New South Wales (ACON) and the Sydney Gay Games Bid.

In 1994, Hardy, along with partner Martien Coucke produced the ‘1994 Lesbian Calendar’, (with an accompanying set of 8 postcards) featuring portraits from the calendar.

== Exhibitions ==
2024: Queer contemporary: C.Moore Hardy: Life in Black, White and Pink, National Art School.

2016: Sydney, Sex & Subculture (historical, hysterical, & happy recollections of the queer community) , Brenda May Gallery, 2 Danks Street, Waterloo, Sydney, 20 February- XMarch 2016

2015: Happy Mardi Gras! Photographic Exhibition, Surry Hills Library, 3 February – 27 March 2015“Opening the vaults, City of Sydney presents their collection of C. Moore Hardy’s two decades of documenting the Sydney Gay & Lesbian Mardi Gras with this photographic exhibition.”

2014: Danger Will Robinson, AirSpace Projects, Marrickville, Sydney, 27–29 June

2014: We are family All Women Exhibition including Michele Aboud, Deborah Kelly, A.M. Laerkensen, rea, The Twilight Girls, Waded, Australian Centre for Photography, March–May 2014 curated by C. Moore Hardy Along with education online support by Phillipa Playford.

2013: Bookish, Marrickville Garage, Marrickville, Sydney, October the exhibition featured the work of artists: Paul Borderi + Jane Polkinghorne; Rowan Conroy; Mitchel Cummings;Ryszard Dabek;Sarah Goffman, Peter Jackson, and Jane Polkinghorne; C.Moore Hardy; Andrew Hazewinkel; Bronia Iwanczak; Anne Kay; Emma Lindsay; Peter Nelson; Elvis Richardson; and Elizabeth Wild

2013: Mardi Gras Museum Exhibition, cnr Oxford and Palmer Streets, Darlinghurst, 30 January-3 March 2013

1997: Leica/CCP Documentary Photography Award, Centre for Contemporary Photography, Sydney, 25 July-23 August 1997

1994: Queerography, Roslyn Oxley9 Gallery, Sydney, 9 February-5 March 1994

1989: A fundamental attack, an exhibition of lesbian and gay art, Holdsworth Contemporary Galleries, presented in conjunction with Sydney Gay Mardi Gras, 31 January -23 February, curated by Catherine M. Phillips --

== Bibliography ==
Hardy’s work features in various publications, selected titles include:

- Sydney Gay Mardi Gras in association with Holdsworth Contemporary Galleries presents : a fundamental attack, an exhibition of lesbian and gay art, January 31-February 23, 1989 / curated by Catherine M. Phillips (East Sydney : Holdsworth Contemporary Galleries, 1989)
- David Phillips, What's so queer here? : Photography at the Gay and Lesbian Mardi Gras, Eyeline, n.29, Summer 1994 (West End, Qld. : Queensland Artworkers Alliance) ISSN 0818-8734
- Lesbian Art : an Encounter with power / Elizabeth Ashburn (Roseville East, NSW : Craftsman House, c1996) ISBN 9766410763
- Stephanie Britton, Image Bank: The Feminist Project, Artlink, March 1994 (Semaphore, SA. : Artlink) ISSN 0727-1239
- Sex in public : Australian sexual cultures / edited by Jill Julius Matthews (St. Leonards, NSW: Australia : Allen & Unwin, 1997) ISBN 1864480491
- Mardi gras! : true stories / edited by Richard Wherrett (Ringwood, Vic. : Penguin Books Australia, 1999) ISBN 0140272267
- ‘The manifestation of queer theology: the act of ‘promulgating universal joy and expiating stigmatic guilt’ through the (re)inscription of rituals, artefacts, devotional practices and place’ by Jason Prior, in Handbook of new religions and cultural production / Carole M. Cusack and Alex Norman (Leiden : Brill Biggleswade Extenza Turpin, 2012) ISBN 9789004221871
- Reveries : photography & mortality / Helen Ennis (Canberra, A.C.T. : National Portrait Gallery, c2007) ISBN 0977576108
- We are Family : Michele Aboud, Deborah Kelly, A.M. Laerkensen, rea, The Twilight Girls, Waded / curator C. Moore Hardy ([Paddington, NSW] : Boccalatte, [2014]) ISBN 9780980631241

== Collections ==
Hardy's work is held in many institutions, most notably the Australian Queer Archives, who hold over 25,000 works, the City of Sydney Archives, who hold 4,120+ images; as well as the National Library of Australia, Griffith University Art Museum, and State Library of New South Wales.
