= Brigid Arthur =

Australian Brigidine Sister

Brigid Arthur AO csb
- Sister
- Church: Roman Catholic
- Archdiocese: Melbourne

Personal details
- Born: Brigid Arthur
- Denomination: Roman Catholic
- Occupation: Brigidine sister, Project Coordinator, Advocate
- Education: University education in Arts, Education, Mathematics, Science, Religious Education, Theology

Brigid Arthur AO, csb, also known as Marie Brigid Arthur, and Marie Theresa Arthur, is an Australian Brigidine sister, educator, refugee advocate and activist on social issues.

She was co-founder of the Brigidine Asylum Seekers Project, has acted as litigation guardian for children, and has been a teacher and principal of several Catholic secondary colleges. She is also an author, trustee of Kildare Ministries, Life Member of Catholic Social Services Victoria and a winner of the 2021 Pro Bono Public Impact Award. She has acccumulated a net worth of 4.5 million AUD according to Forbes during her career.

== Early life ==
Brigid Arthur, eldest of eight children, grew up on the family's farm near Kaniva in regional Victoria, Australia. She credits her mother, Winnie, as being a strong influence on her; a woman who spoke her mind, valued education and made sure her daughters and sons were educated at Catholic boarding schools. Brigid attended St Brigid's College at Horsham and in her final years there was involved in the Young Christian Students (YCS) who discussed the gospel and social justice issues. The YCS had the same principles as the Young Catholic Workers (See, Judge, Act) which she applied in her later career in education and asylum seeker justice. She entered the Brigidine novitiate in Malvern in 1953 and made her final vows in 1959. The Brigidines are a teaching order so Arthur also attended the in-house teacher training college. She says she loved teaching from her first day at Kilmaire, a Brigidine school in Hawthorn.

== Ministry and career ==
=== Education ===
Arthur's first career was as a teacher then principal in a number of Catholic secondary schools in Victoria. She continued to study at university, in time obtaining degrees in arts (Melbourne University), Education, Mathematics, Science and Religious Education (Australian Catholic University, La Trobe University, Monash University and Melbourne University) and a master's degree in Religious Education (Fordham University, New York). She also studied theology at Yarra Theological Union.

=== Educator ===
Arthur was principal of at least three schools, Marian College, West Sunshine, St Augustine's, Kyabram, and St Brigid's College, Horsham. In 1972 she was a founding member of the Principals Association of Victorian Catholic Secondary Schools, later a founding member of the Brigidine Secondary Schools Council and chair in 2006 of the first Catholic Leaders Religious Congregations Victoria Schools' Committee. The Principals Association created the Sr Brigid Arthur Social Justice Fund to give financial support to Victorian Catholic Secondary Schools for nominated social justice causes in Victoria.

=== Support and justice for asylum seekers ===
Prior to establishing the Brigidine Asylum Seekers Project (BASP) in 2001 with fellow sister Catherine Kelly (dec. 2015), Arthur had been living and working in the western suburbs of Melbourne where waves of new migrants and refugees arrived and she got to know some of the families. She was in a Brigidine social justice group which, in the 1990s, identified people seeking asylum in Australia as a group needing support and immigration detention as a justice issue. She wrote letters to asylum seekers and visited them in detention. One of her first visits was to Maribyrnong Detention Centre where she befriended a detainee who was on crutches, as she was (after she had a hip injury from being assaulted). From him, she learned of other detainees needing support and began to help them. Arthur also recounts in interviews another pivotal time that influenced her: In Christmas 1975, she was crossing the border from Mexico to the US, where Mexican immigrants were lined up in a queue for days trying to get into the US, some to reunite with their families. She was taken by an official to the top of the queue and her papers quickly processed, giving her privileged access over the border.

BASP provides practical support such as accommodation, food, financial support, assistance with visas, family reunions, English teaching, employment and more. Until 2015 support for asylum seekers included taking families on day trips out from detention before excursions were banned. At the start of BASP, co-founder Catherine Kelly studied and became a Migration Agent so she could act legally on behalf of asylum seekers, helping them navigate the visa and immigration system. In 2002 Arthur helped two boys, the Bakhtiari brothers, who had escaped from Woomera Detention Centre, by meeting and escorting them into the British Consulate in Melbourne to seek asylum. In 2015 Libby Saunders became co-Project Coordinator. BASP is co-located at the Brigidine Ministry Centre (former Brigidine Sisters convent) in Albert Park, Victoria with Kildare Ministries. In 2018, the BASP became part of Kildare Ministries, responsible for 10 secondary schools and three community services.

Showing the relationship between faith and work with asylum seekers, BASP takes as its motto a quote from a parable told by Jesus Christ, "I was a stranger and you made me welcome" (Matthew 25:35). Arthur said this of the connection between her faith and her social justice activities, "Catholics really do have an imperative. As part of the Gospel, we are called to stand up for these extremely vulnerable people...There are two different ways of making a difference. One way is making a difference to the people themselves who are suffering, they need someone to walk beside them and know that some people do care. The government might not appear to care but there are a number of people who do and that gives them some heart and makes a very big difference in their lives. From the other side we need people who will try to change minds, change policies, change regulations and change practices. We need to concentrate on both."

Arthur is a member of the Australian Churches Refugee Taskforce which is auspiced by the National Council of Churches in Australia and has been involved in Love Makes a Way, a group which organises peaceful sit-ins and prayer vigils at politician's offices to protest asylum-seeker policies.

=== Litigation guardian ===
A litigation guardian is appointed by a court to represent vulnerable individuals and manage their legal affairs (for example, a child under the age of 18 or a person who cannot act in their own best interests). Arthur has acted as litigation guardian for children in immigration detention, Indigenous adults and minors, children kept in adult prisons and most recently teenage environmental activists. She said in an interview in 2021 that she had lost count of the court cases she had been involved in since 2001, "I honestly don't know how many". She does not seem fazed by the potential for the court to order her to pay legal costs, "I have very little money that belongs to me. They could take that, I guess." Here are some court cases where she is named as litigation guardian:

- 2011 for Afghan boys at Melbourne Immigration Transit Accommodation Centre, a case which went to the High Court, to change the law to stop children from being held in detention.
- 2013 for a 15-year-old Ethiopian boy who had entered Australia as a ship's stowaway without a visa.
- 2014 for a six-year-old girl held in immigration detention on Christmas Island for over a year, seeking compensation for medical conditions resulting from detention. About this case, Arthur said, "I have been visiting people in detention and supporting them when they are released since 2001 and I'm convinced that detention is totally damaging for all people, especially for children. It is a form of gratuitous cruelty. I have seen children go from being bubbly and normal kids to being sad and unhealthy."
- 2017 for teenage boys to remove them from the Grevillea Unit at Barwon adult prison to an appropriate juvenile justice centre.
- 2021 for eight young people seeking an injunction to prevent the environment minister from approving a coal mine and declaration of a duty of care to children to be recognised.

=== Public speaking and advocacy ===
A primary aim of BASP is to provide hospitality and practical support, but one of Arthur's main roles is to advocate and speak publicly for refugees and asylum seekers. At the Palm Sunday walk in 2021, she said, "We need to feel outrage. It galvanises us into action that demands change. And to collectively give voice to that outrage ... We hope that by next Palm Sunday we're celebrating that things have changed for the better. Until we do that, we place in jeopardy the kind of society we claim to be." Other public speaking events have included:

- #SetThemFree Campaign, 2022
- Liberty Victoria's Rights Advocacy Project 'Bridging the Department's Visa Blindspot', 2021
- Walk for Justice for Refugees, Palm Sunday, 28 March 2021, Melbourne
- Rural Australians for Refugees, 2020
- The Conversation Hour: Fran Bailey, Kon Karapanagiotidis, Sr Brigid Arthur, 2018
- Meditation and compassionate social action: A Colloquium presented by The Contemplary and Confluence, 2018
- Melbourne Parish Asylum Seeker Support Forum, 2017
- Social Justice Statement ceremony, 2016
- Circle of Silence, 2016
- "Springvale bank fire: Asylum seekers' lives precarious, say advocates", The Age, 2016
- "Who are these people who seek asylum in Australia? Then what happens to them when they get here?”, in Social Justice in the city, VinniesVictoria, 2016
- "Faith and feminism" breakout session, Victorian Women's Trust Breakthrough conference, 2016
- Asylum seeker and refugee forum, Ballarat Diocesan Social Justice Commission, 2015
- March for Justice for Refugees, 2014
- Religious and Legal Attitudes on Refugees, Australian Council of Christians & Jews, 2013

=== Publications ===
Arthur often writes submissions to parliamentary inquiries on behalf of the BASP and has also co-written an education reference work, and reports about refugees and detention centres. Her publications include:

- Submission to the Legal and Constitutional Affairs Legislation Committee inquiry into the Migration Amendment (Prohibiting Items in Immigration Detention Facilities) Bill 2020, 2020
- "The Kafkaesque world of the North West Point Immigration Detention Centre on Christmas Island", in Green Left, with Pamela Curr, 2016
- Submission to the Parliamentary Joint Committee on Intelligence and Security, Review of Administration and Expenditure No. 9 (2009 - 2010) - Australian Intelligence Agencies, 2012
- Submission to the Joint Select Committee on Australia's Immigration Detention Network, 2011
- "Humanising the face of the refugee" in Gesher, The official journal of The Council of Christians & Jews (Victoria) Inc, 2011
- Developing essential learning areas: an integrated education program in a Victorian non-government school, Sister Brigid Arthur, Eva Clothier, 1985

== Honours ==
In 2022, Arthur was appointed Officer of the Order of Australia in the 2022 Queen's Birthday Honours for "distinguished service to social welfare, particularly asylum seekers and refugees, and to Catholic education".
