= Paper and ink testing =

Tests for paper and ink interaction

A variety of tests are used to determine ink and paper and paperboard quality, and to measure their interactions. They are necessary to balance print quality, cost, and wear on the press. Some of the important paper and ink tests are listed here:

== Paper test ==
Paper and ink testing

Tests for paper and ink interaction

A variety of tests are used to determine ink and paper and paperboard quality, and to measure their interactions. They are necessary to balance print quality, cost, and wear on the press. Some of the important paper and ink tests are listed here:

Major paper properties are widely classified into four categories.

1. Physical Properties
2. Optical Properties
3. Mechanical Properties
4. Miscellaneous Properties

=== Physical Properties ===
- Grammage or basis weight
- Thickness
- Bulk
- Porosity or Roughness
- Dimensional stability

==== Grammage Test ====

The mass per area of the paper is measured as GSM (grams per square meter). Paper sheets are cut to a size of 10 cm × 10 cm, then the sheets are weighed individually. The mean of the weights is used to calculate the mass of the paper per square meter, and the standard deviation is determined from all samples.

==== Thickness ====
Defines the thickness of the paper. Consistency of Caliper throughout the paper web is an important consideration. An abrupt increase or decrease in caliper can affect the extent to which the printing plate or blanket contacts the paper and transfers a complete printed image, as well as other printability and runability issues.

==== Bulk ====
Thickness of the paper in relation with GSM. Not only is consistent thickness required in web offset lithography, where varying bulk within a single roll can cause the roll to unwind with uneven tension, which is responsible for various printing defects as well as web breaks. Higher bulk of the same GSM will reduce the show through defects.

==== Porosity or roughness ====
A degree of peaks and valleys on the surface of the paper. High roughness of the paper results in more consumption and many other printability defects, too.

==== Dimensional stability ====
A measure of the extent to which a paper will resist a change in size as the result of a change in moisture content. Dimensional instability will result in mis-registration in the press.

=== Optical properties ===
- Gloss
- Whiteness
- Brightness
- opacity
- Shade

==== Opacity ====
Opacity is a property of paper that describes the amount of light which is transmitted through it, with paper having a low degree of opacity being more translucent and allowing more light to pass through it. A paper's opacity determines the extent to which printing on a particular side of paper will be visible from the reverse side (called show-through)

==== Paper shade ====
Paper shade plays a significant role in the quality of colour reproduction. The shade of the paper affects the colour values of the primary and secondary colours and hence the colour gamut of a press. The standard for paper shade of newsprint as per ISO 12647-3 is mentioned in the table.

Backing	L*	a*	b*
Black backing	82	0	3
White Backing	85.2	0.9	5.2

The maximum tolerance specified is ∆L 4, ∆a 2 and ∆b 2. When selecting a paper for production, it is very important to measure the paper shade. A spectrophotometer or a spectrodensitometer can be used. Publishers should also check for batch to batch variations. The ultimate aim is to use the paper which has a shade closer to ISO specification.

=== Mechanical properties ===
- Bursting Strength
- % of Elongation
- Compressibility
- Tensile strength—MD & CD
- Relative Moisture content

==== Burst strength ====
Bursting strength the maximum pressure that a paper can tolerate before rupture. It is an important property for packaging materials, not so important for newsprint / commercial papers.

It is measured directly by the Mullen Tester which provides a value in units of pressure. Other tests used for packaging papers are the Ring Crush Test and the Short-Span Compression Test which provide values in units of force.

==== % of Elongation ====
The maximum length a paper can be stretched without breaking, expressed as a percentage of the material's original length. An important parameter to relate in terms of breaks.

==== Compressibility ====
The degree of reduction in thickness under compressive forces or pressure is known as compressibility of the paper. It influences the ability of paper to change its surface contour and conform to make contact with the printing plate or blanket during print production.

Not to be confused with Compression Strength, a mechanical property of all materials, with units of pressure.

==== Tear strength / resistance, MD and CD ====
Tearing strength is the ability of the paper to withstand any tearing force without break. It is useful to evaluate web runability, controlling the quality of newsprint and characterizing the toughness of packaging paper.

Tear strength for paper is measured in units of force, frequently measured with the Elmendorf Tester. Tear Factor is tear strength per unit basis weight, Tear_Strength/Grammage, or N/g/m^{2}.

==== Tensile and elongation, MD and CD ====
This is the ability of the paper to withstand a stretching force without break. The higher the tensile strength of the paper is, the less the chances of web breaks due to high tension at press.

==== Relative Moisture content ====
% of moisture content in the paper is known as relative moisture content. High moisture content will increase the weight of the paper and increase the cost of paper. At the same time, low moisture content will make the paper brittle and increases the chances of break in production.

=== Miscellaneous properties ===
- Roughness or Porosity
- Ash Content
- pH or Alkalinity of paper
- Pick test
- Water absorbency
- Oil absorption

==== Roughness or porosity ====
Roughness indicates varying degree of porosity of the paper. Porosity is a direct indication of paper to accept ink or water.

==== Ash content ====
The residue left after complete combustion of paper at high temperature is known as ash content of the paper. It is generally expressed as percent of the original test sample and represents filler content in the paper. Ash content is not an important property of paper but it helps to know the level of fillers in the paper and grade of papers.

==== pH of paper ====
The pH value of paper indicates the residual acidic/alkaline chemicals in pulp, or atmospheric pollutants. It is an environmental KPI parameter in paper making. Acidic paper made from wood-based pulp that still contains lignin will deteriorate over time by becoming brittle and turning yellow. For document preservation, acid-free papers are therefore gaining popularity and have pH of 7 or slightly higher.

==== Pick test ====
A pick test gives an indication of fluff accumulation in the newsprint. Decides the strength of the fiber bonding on the paper surface. Often studied to relate fluff accumulation on the Press.

==== Water absorbency ====
The water absorbent capacity of the paper in terms of kilogram per square metre is known as water absorbency.

== Ink test ==
- Grindness or pigment size
- Color shades
- Ink Mileage
- Transparency
- Viscosity
- Tack
- Fineness of the grind

=== Grinding ===
The fineness of grind and size of particles in the ink. Optimum pigment size improves the dispersion of pigments into the vehicle (solvent). Pigment size could be related to image wear on the press, larger pigment size may lead to more abrasion on the image in the plate and may result in image wear.

=== Transparency ===
Total amount of surface area a given quantity of ink to produce the standard density. Different ink brands and different batches can give different mileage. As ink is one of the major materials, an ideal study of ink mileage will help to save the cost.

=== Colour values of primary and secondary colours ===
The colour produced by ink depends on the ink composition, pigments and also the paper shade. This test can be done in two ways. 1. Same ink printed over different paper substrates and 2. Different ink samples printed over a standard newsprint that matches ISO specification.

The most important thing that should be noted is the colour of the inks at the ISO specified density i.e. C 0.9, M 0.9, Y 0.9 and K 1.1. The ∆E value between ISO specified colours and the colours produced by the sample ink gives the ink's deviation from standard.

The colour values of the secondary colours (R, G and B) are also measured. From the colour values of C, M, Y, R, G and B, a 2-D curve of the colour gamut can be plotted and compared with the ISO colour values.

=== Print density and Ink requirement ===
Ink requirement is defined as the amount of ink needed to print a unit area with a standard Solid Ink Density. For newsprint, the ISO 12647-3 specification is C 0.90, M 0.90, Y 0.90 and K 1.10, Status E, D50, 2o, density minus paper with polarization filter. Ink requirement is measured as g/m2 (grams of ink required to print 1 m2 of paper)

Different paper substrates require different amounts of ink to achieve the standard SID. A highly porous substrate generally requires a higher amount of ink compared to a less porous substrate. Therefore, to study the ink mileage of different paper substrates, this test can be done on all the newsprint samples.

Ink requirement also depends upon the ink formulation and the colour strength of the pigments. From this test, the ink mileage of all the four process colours, when printed in the same paper, can be studied.

=== Trapping ===
Trap is a measure of the ability of a wet ink film printed on the paper to accept the next ink printed on top of it. Preucil’s formula is used to measure trap. % Trap = {(Density of overprint – Density of 1st ink)/Density of 2nd ink} x 100

Trap affects the colour values of the secondary colours, and plays a major role in defining the color gamut of a press. Poor trap leads to colour shift in the secondary colours. Trap is also affected by the ink tack, viscosity, ink film thickness and the impression pressure.

=== Set-off ===
Set-off is defined as the tendency of ink to transfer from a freshly printed surface to another paper when pressed without any friction. Set-off is an unwanted behavior of paper and ink. It is influenced by the characteristics of the paper and ink: a porous paper surface absorbs the ink fast results in lesser set-off, as do inks that dry (or set) quickly. The higher the speed of the press, the higher the set-off will be.

Set-off is measured at two different time intervals, 0.35s and 3s. A freshly printed surface is pressed against a paper after 0.35s and after 3s. Then the set-off density is measured. The idea behind selecting these two timings is to know what will be the set-off when the materials are used in a high-speed press and a low-speed press. The table below gives an example of set-off measurement.

Ink	0.35 s	3 s
Cyan	0.09	0.07
Magenta	0.11	0.09
Yellow	0.09	0.07
Black	0.10	0.08

Print through is measured as the print density of the reverse side of the printed-paper which is printed at a standard print density. The lower the print through, the better the paper.

=== Fineness of ink grind ===
Fineness of ink grind is an important parameter that describes the quality of dispersion of the pigments in the ink. A grindometer is used to test the fineness of the pigment particles. The lower the particle size the better is the dispersion of the ink.

== Ink and paper Printability testings ==
The following tests are considered as printability tests as these properties are influenced by characteristics of both paper and Ink and also the type of print process.
