= Val Eastwood =

Australian dancer and activist

Val Eastwood (17 August 1927 – 10 December 2009) was a dancer, model, and author best known for operating a series of cafes through the 1950s to 1970s that became a gathering point for Melbourne's gay and lesbian community.

As a teenager, Eastwood ran her own dancing school in Ivanhoe, before joining the Tivoli Theatre in Melbourne's central business district, then becoming a partner in the Betty Lee Academy of dance.

Eastwood described herself as "outrageous", was openly lesbian, and regularly wore men's suits with lipstick in public.

Eastwood opened her first cafe, Val's Coffee Lounge, in her mid twenties, at 123 Swanston Street in Melbourne. This was a rare venue which welcomed the "camp" community, which was otherwise underground. Initially a single, upstairs floor which seated 80, it expanded to cover two levels, open from morning until late at night, at a time when evening alcohol sales were forbidden. The coffee lounge catered to theatre audiences, and particularly gay people. There was a weekly live music concert. Over the next two decades, this was followed by Cafe 31 in St Kilda, Cafe Ad Lib in South Yarra and Val's Restaurant in Hawthorn.

In the 1960s she began writing short stories, a collection of which were published in 2009 as The Travelling Mind of Val Eastwood, by the Australian Queer Archives.

In 2009, the name Val's Cafe was used for a government-funded program to support ageing LGBTI people in health and wellbeing.
