= Dennis Altman =

Australian academic and activist

Dennis Altman AM
- Born: Dennis Patkin Altman; 1943 (age 82–83); Sydney, New South Wales, Australia
- Education: Cornell University
- Occupations: Academic, activist

Dennis Patkin Altman AM (born 1943) is an Australian academic and gay rights activist.

== Early life and education ==
Dennis Patkin Altman was born in 1943 in Sydney, New South Wales, to Jewish immigrant parents, and spent most of his childhood in Hobart, Tasmania.

In 1964 he won a Fulbright scholarship to Cornell University, where he began working with American gay activists.

== Career ==
Returning to Australia in 1969, Altman taught politics at the University of Sydney.

In 1971, Altman published his first book, Homosexual: Oppression and Liberation – considered an important intellectual contribution to the gay liberation movements in the English-speaking world. Among his ideas were "the polymorphous whole" as well as "the end of the homosexual", in which the potential for both heterosexual and homosexual behaviour becomes a widespread cultural and psychological phenomenon.

Altman was a contributor to the New York City-based gay liberation newspaper Come Out!, published by the Gay Liberation Front, writing two articles for them in 1970 and their last issue in 1972.

One of Altman's most notable speeches was delivered during the first Gay Liberation Group meeting at the University of Sydney on 19 January 1972. It was reprinted as the chapter "Forum on Sexual Liberation" in his book Coming out in the Seventies.

In 1985, he became a lecturer at La Trobe University, where he later became a professor of politics. He wrote In the Mind of America (1986) and Power and Community (1994), both about HIV/AIDS.

In 1997 Altman wrote the essay, "Global gaze/global gays", in which he proposes that there are cultural connections between homosexuals in different countries and there is a nascent global gay culture.

In his preface to the 1995 republication of his 1946 novel The City and the Pillar, Gore Vidal wrote that Altman had taken a copy of the book back with him to Australia around 1970, but it was seized at Sydney Airport. The book was subsequently declared obscene by a judge who observed that the Australian obscenity law was "absurd", thus leading to it being repealed sometime later. In 2005 Altman published Gore Vidal's America, a study of Vidal's writings on history, politics, sex, and religion.

Altman was appointed Visiting Chair of Australian Studies at Harvard University in January 2005. In 2006 he was a professorial fellow in the Institute for Human Security at La Trobe University. In 2009 he was appointed director of the Institute for Human Security at La Trobe University.

Altman was president of the AIDS Society of Asia and the Pacific from 2001-2005. He was a member of the Governing Council of the International AIDS Society from 2004-2012. In October 2006 he was elected to the board of Oxfam Australia. In 2010 he stepped down from this position.

Altman is a longtime patron of the Australian Queer Archives.

== Recognition ==
In July 2006, he was listed by The Bulletin as one of the 100 most influential Australians ever.

In June 2008, he was appointed a Member of the Order of Australia.

At the APCOM HERO Awards 2021, he was awarded the Shivananda Khan Award for Extraordinary Achievement.

== Personal life ==
Altman's partner of 22 years, Anthony Smith, died from lung cancer in November 2012.

== Publications ==
- Homosexual: oppression and liberation. Outerbridge & Dienstfrey. 1971. ISBN 0-87690-039-2.
- Coming out in the seventies. Sydney: Wild and Woolley. 1979. ISBN 978-0-226-01606-1.
- Rehearsals for change: politics and culture in Australia. Sydney: Fontana/Collins. 1980.
- The Homosexualization of America: The Americanization of the Homosexual. New York: St. Martin's Press. 1982.
- AIDS in the mind of America. Garden City, N.Y.: Anchor Press/Doubleday. 1986.
- The comfort of men. Port Melbourne, Vic.: W. Heinemann Australia. 1993.
- Power and community: organizational and cultural responses to AIDS. London; Bristol, PA: Taylor & Francis. 1994.
- Defying gravity: a political life. St Leonards, NSW: Allen & Unwin. 1997.
- Global sex. Chicago: The University of Chicago Press. 2001. ISBN 978-0-226-01606-1.
- Gore Vidal's America. Cambridge; Malden, MA: Polity. 2005.
- 51st state?. Carlton North, Vic.: Scribe Short Books. 2006.
- The End of the Homosexual?. St Lucia, Qld: University of Queensland Press. 2013.
- Altman, Dennis & Jonathan Symons (2016). Queer Wars: The New Global Polarization over Gay Rights. Cambridge, UK: Polity.
- Unrequited Love. Clayton, Victoria: Monash University Publishing. 2019. ISBN 9781925835120.
- God Save The Queen: the strange persistence of monarchies. Brunswick, Victoria: Scribe Publications. 2021. ISBN 9781922310569.
- Death in the Sauna. Melbourne, Victoria: Clouds of Magellan Press. 2023. ISBN 9780645732801.
- Righting My World - Essays from the Past Half-Century. Melbourne, Victoria: Monash University Publishing. 2025. ISBN 9781923192515.
