= Bree Munro =

Australian freestyle skier

Personal information
- Nationality: Australian
- Born: 12 May 1981 (age 45) Melbourne, Australia
- Height: 162 cm (64 in) (2010)
- Weight: 62 kg (137 lb) (2010)

Sport
- Country: Australia
- Sport: Freestyle Skiing
- Event: Aerials
- Club: Team Buller
- Coached by: Christian Kaufmann

Achievements and titles
- Olympic finals: 2010 Winter Olympics

Bree Munro (born 12 May 1981) is an Australian aerial freestyle skier. She went to high school and university in Victoria and was involved in competitive gymnastics prior to taking up skiing in 2002. Her first appearance on the Australian national team was at Mt Buller hosted 2002 World Cup. She was in the running but did not make the Australian 2006 Winter Olympics team. An injury while training for the 2006/2007 World Cup season resulted in not competing for nearly two years. She competed at the 2010 Winter Olympics in freestyle skiing in the aerials event, where she finished 18th and did not qualify for the finals.

== Personal ==
Munro was born in Melbourne on 12 May 1981, and lived in Blackburn, Victoria in 2010. She is 162 centimetres (64 in) tall, weighs 62 kilograms (137 lb) and has pierced ears. Her aunt is Jo Hall, a Channel Nine newsreader. Prior to participating in skiing, she was a competitive gymnast. Competing at the China National Gymnastics titles, she finished third in the bars.

Munro attended Kilbreda College in Mentone, Victoria where she earned her Victorian Certificate of Education. In 2010, she was attending Australian Catholic University, Melbourne where she was pursuing a degree in exercise science.

== Freestyle skiing ==
Munro has been affiliated with the Australian Institute of Sport, Victorian Institute of Sport and the Australian Olympic Winter Institute. Her primary skiing training base is in Switzerland with a secondary base in Mt Buller, Australia. She was coached by Christian Kaufmann in 2010. She is a member of the Team Buller skiing club. As a result of skiing, she has had to have a knee reconstruction, injured her neck and hurt ribs. In her ski career, she has dealt with extreme temperatures of −40 °C (−40 °F).

Munro took up freestyle skiing in 2002. Her first appearance on the Australian national team was at Mt Buller hosted 2002 World Cup. She injured herself neck at an Australian skiing competition and missed most of the 2002/2003 ski season as a result. She started the 2003/2004 ski season by competing at two events in Australia. During the 2004/2005 ski season, she competed overseas for the first time. During the 2005/2006 season, she landed her first competition triple twisting double somersault. She ended the season ranked eighth. She was in the running to go to the 2006 Winter Olympics but Jacqui Cooper was chosen ahead of her on the Australian team. In December 2006, she finished 11th at a competition in Changchun. She then finished 12th at a competition at Deer Valley in January 2007. While skiing at Apex Mountain in preparation for the 2006/2007 World Cup season, she injured her knee. As a result, she missed most of that ski season and the 2007/2008 season. She finished 9th at the 2009 World Ski Championships held in Inawashiro, Japan. She finished 6th and 18th at the 2009 World Cup held in Changchun, China. She finished 20th at the 2010 World Cup held in Deer Valley. She finished 22nd at the 2010 World Cup held in Calgary, Canada. In the lead up to the Olympics, she finished fourth at the 2010 World Cup in Lake Placid. She finished 9th at the 2010 World Cup held in Mont Gabriel, Canada. She competed at the 2010 Winter Olympics in freestyle skiing in the aerials event. The Games were her first. She finished 18th overall with a combined run score of 143.46. She had a score of 74.37 after her first jump, and was 17th place. Her second run had a score of 69.09, where she finished 16th for the run. These scores were not good enough to qualify her for the event finals.
