= Marian College (Ararat) =

Marian College, Ararat

Location
- Ararat, Victoria; Australia; 37°17′06″S 142°56′18″E

Information
- Type: Independent co-educational secondary day school
- Motto: Latin: Fortiter et Suaviter
- Religious affiliation: Brigidine Sisters
- Denomination: Roman Catholic
- Established: 1888; 138 years ago
- Principal: Catherine Howison
- Campus type: Regional
- Website: www.mcararat.catholic.edu.au

Marian College is an independent Roman Catholic co-educational secondary day school located in Ararat, Victoria, Australia.

Established in 1955, Marian College works under the governance of the Brigidine Sisters.

== History ==
Marian College in Ararat was founded in 1889 by five Brigidine Sisters from Ireland including Johanna Barron. They arrived in November 1888 and St Mary's Primary School opened in 1889 with a school roll of 60. The sisters had been requested by the Bishop of Ballarat James Moore.

The foundress being Mother Gertrude Kelly (1870–1929). It follows the five Brigidine Core Values and is under the motto "Fortiter et Suaviter" Strength and Gentleness. The sisters came on the boat "The Ormuz" and moved into the new brick convent. The original convent is still in use in the school today housing the chapel, parlour, hall, offices, library and staff area.

== See also ==
- Catholic education in Australia
- List of high schools in Victoria
- List of non-government schools in Victoria
