= Simone De La Rue =

American dancer and fitness expert

Simone De La Rue is a former dancer and now a Hollywood fitness expert, also a founder of Body By Simone dance-based fitness studios. She is one of the Hollywood's famous Fitness experts, and trains celebrity, with more people joining her.

== Publicity ==
Simone appeared on E! Channel's Season One of Khloe Kardashian's Revenge Body in 2016, and will be appearing in Season 2 airing in 2017.

She has been featured as a fitness expert to the stars on Television shows such as Home and Living, Access Hollywood, The Insider, Extra, E News, E! News Daily Pop, CBS The Couch, and Good Day LA. She has also been featured in number of publications including Women's Health, Forbes, New York Times, Harper's BAZAAR, W Magazine, Shape Magazine, InStyle, Vanity Fair, and Vogue.

In October 2017, Porter Magazine named her as one of their Incredible Women inspiring change in.

Her full workout videos are regularly featured on Pop Sugar Fitness.

== Dance career ==
Simone began training in classical ballet at the age of three and has enjoyed a successful dance career spanning over two decades, including numerous performances on Broadway, London’s West End and her native Australia.

== Author ==
Simone published her book Body By Simone: The 8-Week Total Body Makeover Plan in 2012. The book includes workout, nutrition, lifestyle and self-love advice.

The book launched to a mass of positive reviews.

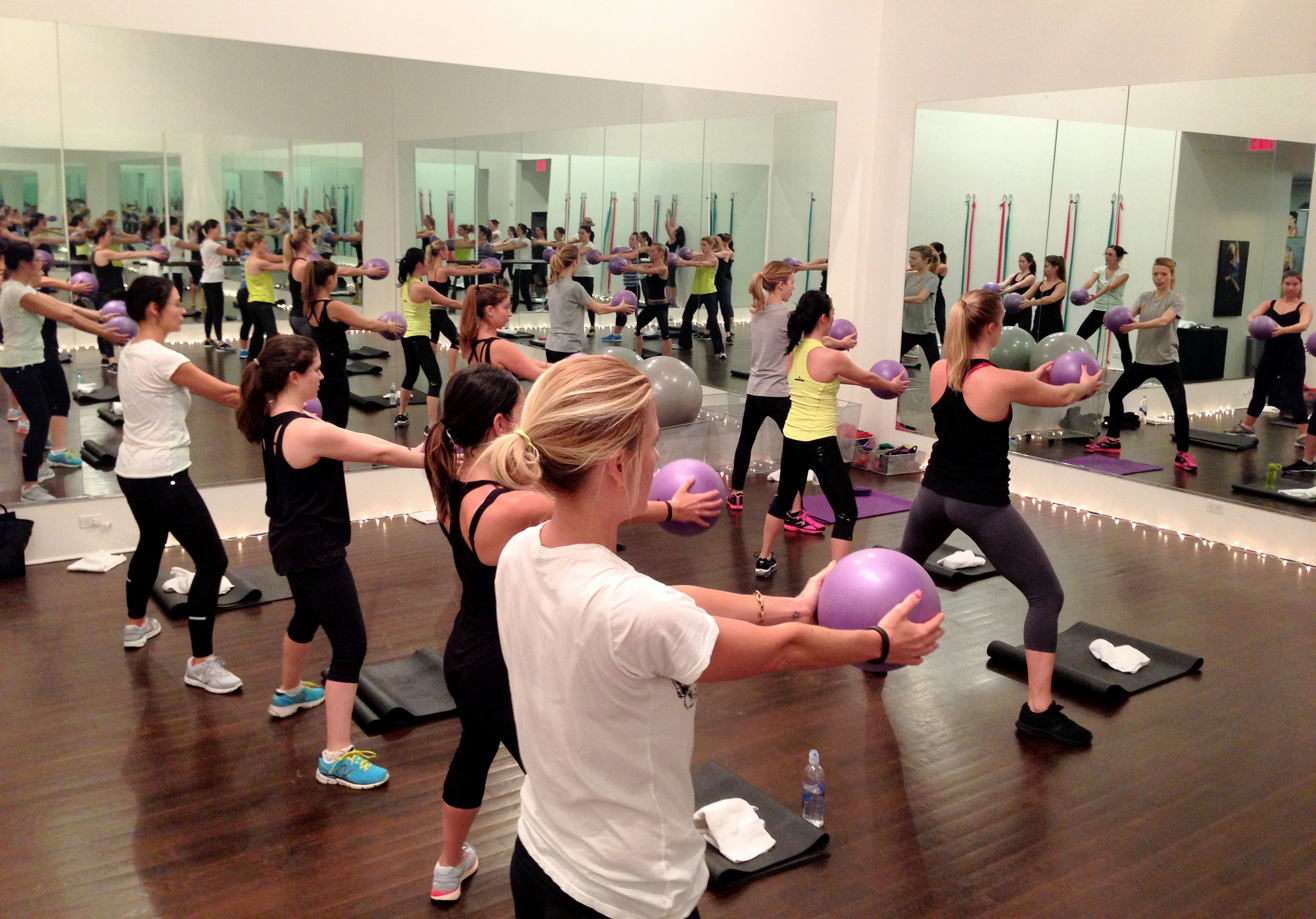
Body By Simone Dance Fitness Studio in Chelsea, NY

== BBS (Body By Simone) ==
Simone initially created the Body By Simone technique to safeguard against injuries and create a safe and fun environment for women to workout, and connect to their bodies and selves.

The first Body By Simone dance inspired studio opened in 2011, and the franchise now includes two Los Angeles studios and one NYC studio.

Body By Simone has released four DVDs: The Signature Classes (2015), Hips, Thighs and Buns (2016), Dance Cardio (2017), and Trampoline Cardio (2017); and in 2012, released an online streaming service called Body By Simone (BBS) TV, a library of the method workout videos that allows users to stream workout and lifestyle tips remotely.

Body By Simone Studios include a range of BBS Merchandise including a clothing line, a co-branded shoe with Newton Running, and a Soma Glass collaboration water bottle, and branded equipment.
