= Johanna Barron =

Australian Brigidine sister (1865–1948)

Mother Paul
- Born: Johanna Barron; 1865; Knockeen
- Died: 15 October 1948 (aged 82–83); Albert Park
- Occupation: Mother Provincial
- Known for: unifying convent management

Johanna Barron (1865 – 15 October 1948) was an Australian Brigidine sister known as Mother Paul. She created an organisation of the convents in Victoria and New South Wales taking the position for herself of Mother Provincial.

== Life ==
Barron was born in County Waterford in Ireland at Knockeen in 1865. Her parents were Mary (born Power) and her husband Thomas Barron. She went to a National School before being joining the Brigidine Convent in Abbeyleix where she professed in 1885.

Marian College in the state of Victoria at Ararat was founded in 1889 by Barron and four other Brigidine Irish Sisters. They all arrived in November 1888 and St Mary's Primary School opened in 1889 with a school roll of 60. The sisters had been requested by the Bishop of Ballarat James Moore. The new convent was paid for by public donations starting with a woman's gift of five shillings. Building began in 1889 and Bishop Moore blessed the two storey red brick building in 1890. This was the first Catholic school in Ararat.

The arrival of the five nuns was complicated because there was already three new communities of Brigidine sisters that had been founded in Victoria. Two communities had been founded at Echuca and Beechworth in 1886 and the year before Moor's arrival another community had been founded at Wangaratta. These three were within the domain of Bishop Martin Crane. Traditionally each community would be independent but Barron organised for all the communities to amalgamate in 1889. She created a single structure that covered the states of Victoria and New South Wales containing communities irrespective of whether they had Australian or Irish roots.

In 1908 she became Mother Provincial until 1920. Mother Gertrude Kelly was to be the Mother Superior in Ararat. She died in 1929. Barron was the superior at Ararat and Albert Park from 1920 until 1932 when she returned to being the Mother Provincial. She was again superior at Albert Park from 1938 to 1944.

Barron died in 1948 in Albert Park.
