= Caliber (mathematics) =

In mathematics, the caliber or calibre of a topological space X is a cardinal κ such that for every set of κ nonempty open subsets of X there is some point of X contained in κ of these subsets. This concept was introduced by Shanin (1948).

There is a similar concept for posets. A pre-caliber of a poset P is a cardinal κ such that for any collection of elements of P indexed by κ, there is a subcollection of cardinality κ that is centered. Here a subset of a poset is called centered if for any finite subset there is an element of the poset less than or equal to all of them.
