= Mary Gertrude Banahan =

Catholic nun, teacher

Mary Gertrude Banahan (c. 1856 – 17 March 1932) was a New Zealand Catholic religious sister and teacher. She was born in Ireland, where she joined the Brigidine Sisters as a novice in 1873. She and other sisters immigrated to Australia in 1883, to operate a school. In 1898, she was part of a group of sisters invited to establish the Brigidine order in Masterton, New Zealand. She helped establish St Bride's Convent at Masterton. Banahan served as superior in several convents until her death in 1932.
