= Brigidine College Randwick =

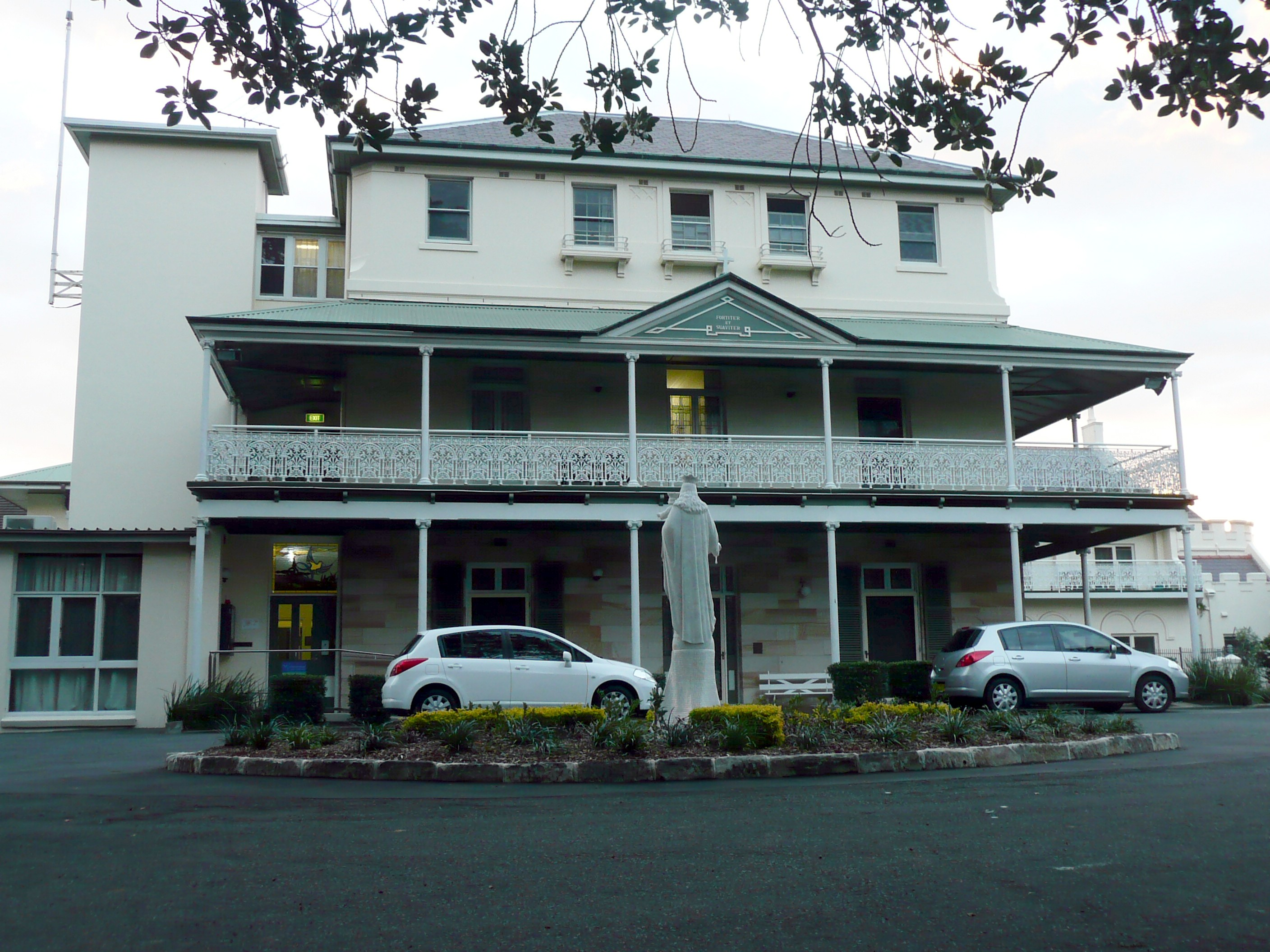

Location
- 6 Aeolia Street; Randwick, New South Wales, 2031; Australia
- 33°55′8″S 151°14′36″E

Information
- Type: Catholic secondary day school
- Motto: Latin: Fortiter et suaviter (With Strength and Gentleness)
- Religious affiliation: Brigidine Sisters
- Denomination: Roman Catholic
- Established: 1901; 125 years ago
- Educational authority: New South Wales Education Standards Authority
- Oversight: Sydney Catholic Schools
- Principal: Adrian Eussen
- Years: 7–12
- Gender: Girls
- Enrolment: c. 900
- Colours: Green, navy blue and gold
- Website: https://bcrandwick.syd.catholic.edu.au/

Brigidine College Randwick is an independent Roman Catholic secondary day school for girls located in Randwick, an eastern suburb of Sydney, New South Wales, Australia.

== History ==
The college was founded by the Brigidine Sisters in September 1901. The Congregation of Brigidine Sisters, founded in Ireland by Bishop Daniel Delaney in 1807, has as their motto "Fortiter et Suaviter", translated as "With Strength and Gentleness". Based upon the Delaney family crest, the unique Brigid's cross and the Lamp of Learning are incorporated into this worldwide Brigidine symbol.

== Academic ==
Brigidine College did very well in the 2007 HSC. The school ranked 30th in the state for English, with 100% of the students in Advanced English, English Extension 1 and Extension 2 being placed in the top two bands.

Half of the Visual Arts HSC students were nominated for ARTexpress, an art exhibition that showcases works of Higher School Certificate Visual Arts student works.

== Notable alumni ==
- Angelica Merlot – NHMRC, CINSW and UNSW Scientia Research Fellow, recipient of the 2019 NSW Woman of the Year Award, and Australia's youngest recipient of a National Health and Medical Research Council Grant.
- C. Moore Hardy – photographer
- Samantha Noble – actress
- Vanessa Panousis – basketball player
- Helen Quach – music conductor
- Renae Ryan – Academic Director of the Science in Australia Gender Equity (SAGE) Program at University of Sydney.
- Juliet Shields – Lawyer and public servant in the Northern Territory
- Ella Stack – First Lord Mayor of Darwin
- Jessica Thornton – Track and Field Sprinter: 2016 Summer Olympics

== See also ==
- List of non-government schools in New South Wales
