= Daughters of Bilitis (Australia) =

First gay rights group in Australia

The Australian arm of the Daughters of Bilitis was formed in Melbourne in 1969, and is considered Australia's first gay rights group. It was inspired by the American Daughters of Bilitis movement. After a few months, the group rejected the increasing radicalisation of its American counterpart, and renamed itself the Australasian Lesbian Movement.

== See also ==
- LGBT rights in Australia
- List of LGBT rights organisations
- Coalition of Activist Lesbians Australia (COAL)
