= Monte Punshon =

Australian artist and teacher

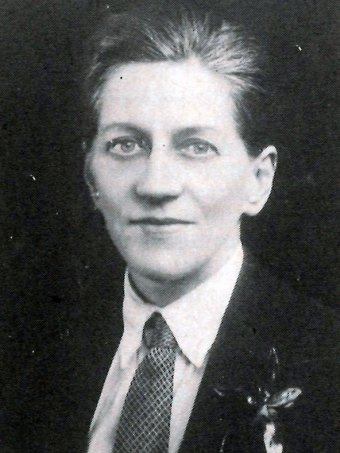
- Monte Punshon c.1930s
- Born: Ethel May Punshon; 8 November 1882; Ballarat, Victoria, Australia
- Died: 4 April 1989 (aged 106); Heidelberg, Victoria, Australia
- Education: University of Melbourne evening classes
- Known for: achievements after becoming age 100

Ethel May (Monte) Punshon (8 November 1882 – 4 April 1989) was an Australian artist and teacher. She was known for her kindness to interned Japanese during the second world war. After she reached the age of 100, she came out, joined MENSA, wrote her autobiography, was given a decoration by Japan, and was an ambassador for Expo 88.

== Life ==
Punshon was born in 1882 in the Australian state of Victoria in Ballarat.

In 1910, she had a twelve year relationship with a woman named Debbie. They lived together until Debbie left her for another woman. Debbie died two years later and Punshon had no more long-term relationships.

In 1943, Punshon worked at the internment camp near Tatura for Japanese people who had been living in Australia during World War II. She looked after the compound set aside for those who could not speak English and the school in the camp.

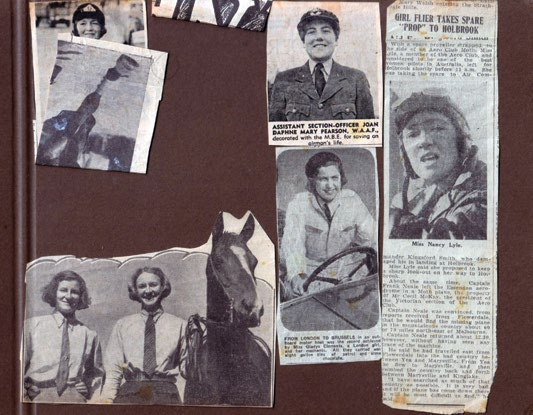
A page from Monte Punshons scrapbooks covering 1923-1950

Moshi Inagaki, who introduced the teaching of Japanese at the University of Melbourne and was Punshon's Japanese teacher, was one of the internees.

After the war, all the internees were released and Punshon took a variety of jobs assisting with the people displaced by the war. She was also in what is now Vanuatu where she founded a school in the New Hebrides. Punshon taught at Melbourne's Swinburne Technical College from 1956 until she retired in 1959.

She came to the attention of the wife of a Japanese diplomat who was impressed when she researched Punshon's work during the war. In 1980 the Japanese foreign minister Saburo Okita gave her a certificate of appreciation.

In 1985, she was described as the "world's oldest lesbian" and that she had "come out". In 1987 her autobiography, Monte-San: The Times Between : Life Lies Hidden, was published, but it did not mention her girlfriends.

She joined MENSA when she was 103 and when she was 105 she was made a roving ambassador for World Expo 88. She was given the Japanese Order of the Sacred Treasure in 1988. Punshon died in 1989 in the Melbourne suburb of Heidelberg.
