= St Joseph's College, Echuca =

St Joseph's College

Location
- Echuca, Victoria; Australia
- Coordinates: 36°7′5″S 144°44′37″E

Information
- Type: Independent co-educational secondary day school
- Motto: Strength and Kindliness
- Religious affiliation: Brigidine Sisters
- Denomination: Roman Catholic
- Established: 1886; 140 years ago
- Principal: Anne Marie Cairns
- Campus type: Regional
- Colours: Green and gold
- Website: www.sje.vic.edu.au

St Joseph's College is an independent Roman Catholic co-educational secondary day school, located in Echuca, Victoria, Australia. Established in 1886, St. Joseph's works under the governance of the Brigidine Sisters.

== Notable former students ==
- Harley Reid – AFL player
- Andrew Walker – AFL player
- Noah Long- AFL player
- Sarah Jones- Journalist

== See also ==
- List of non-government schools in Victoria
- Victorian Certificate of Education
- Vocational Education and Training
- Victorian Certificate of Applied Learning
