= Calibre (menswear) =

Australian fashion label

Calibre Clothing
- Type: Privately held company
- Industry: Fashion, Retail
- Founded: 1989
- Founder: Gary Zecevic
- Headquarters: Melbourne, Victoria, Australia
- Products: Menswear
- Website: www.calibre.com.au

Calibre is an Australian menswear brand launched in 1989 by Gary Zecevic. The brand specialises in tailored casual garments.

== History ==
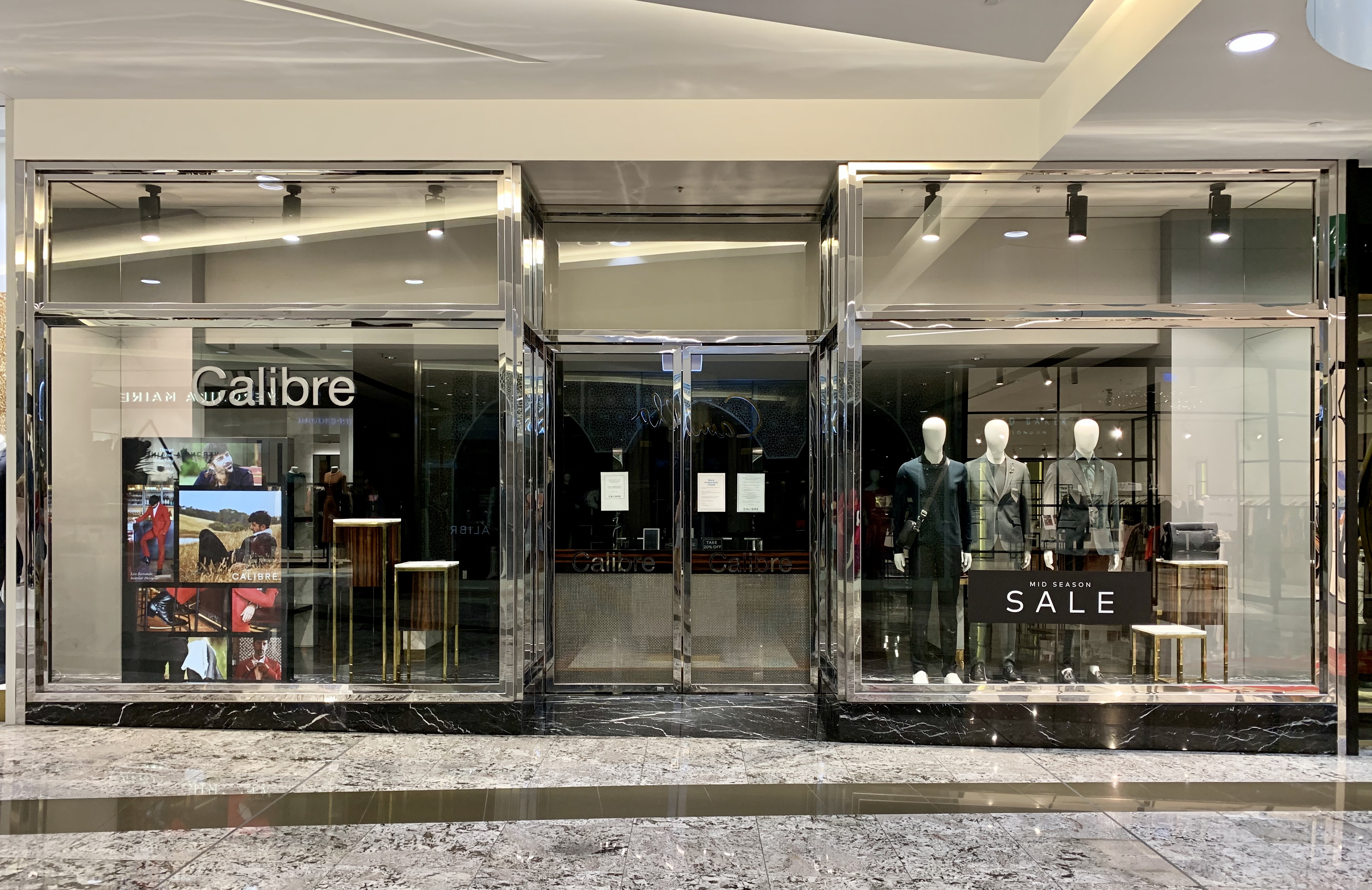
Calibre store in Indooroopilly Shopping Centre

In 1989, Gary Zecevic opened his first Calibre store in South Yarra, Melbourne. Three years later, he opened his second Melbourne store, followed by two additional stores in Sydney. By 1997, Calibre began exporting products at Barneys New York, Fred Segal in Los Angeles and Lane Crawford in Hong Kong. Exports ceased in the early 2000s in order to focus on the Australian market. In 2006, The Australian speculated the company was turning over nearly $20 million. The first Calibre concession store opened in David Jones in 2009, and their online store was launched in 2011.

== Present day ==
Calibre now has 16 stores and eight concessions within David Jones stores nationally, as well as its own e-commerce website which ships products globally. The company's headquarters are in Melbourne.

== Awards ==
Calibre won the 2015 Vogue Fashion Laureate award for Best Menswear, additionally the founder Gary Zecevic was awarded the GQ Australian Men of the Year award for Fashion in 2007.
