= Brigidine College, St Ives =

Brigidine College

Location
- St Ives, Sydney, New South Wales; Australia; 33°43′16″S 151°10′22″E

Information
- Type: Independent secondary day school
- Motto: Latin: Fortiter Et Suaviter (Strength and Gentleness)
- Religious affiliation: Brigidine Sisters
- Denomination: Roman Catholic
- Established: 9 February 1954; 72 years ago
- Principal: Shane Hogan
- Employees: ~188
- Grades: 7–12
- Gender: Girls
- Enrolment: c. 900 (2007)
- Campus type: Suburban
- Colours: Maroon and blue
- Affiliation: Association of Heads of Independent Schools of Australia; Association of Independent Schools of New South Wales; Alliance of Girls' Schools Australasia; Association of Heads of Independent Girls' Schools
- Website: www.brigidine.nsw.edu.au

Brigidine College is an independent Catholic secondary day school for girls located in St Ives, on the North Shore of Sydney, New South Wales, Australia.

Established in 1954 by the Brigidine Sisters, Brigidine has a non-selective enrolment policy and it caters for approximately 900 students from Year 7 to Year 12. The majority of students are drawn from the Northern Beaches, North Shore and Forest areas of Sydney.

The school is affiliated with the Association of Heads of Independent Schools of Australia (AHISA), the Association of Independent Schools of New South Wales (AIS NSW), the Alliance of Girls' Schools Australasia, and is a member of the Association of Heads of Independent Girls' Schools (AHIGS).

== History ==
The Brigidine Sisters opened Brigidine College, a secondary college for girls, on its current site in St Ives, on 9 February 1954, with nine foundation pupils. The site on which the college was built had previously been an orchard and dairy, and was still surrounded by semi-rural properties.

The Brigidine Sisters remained the administrators and teachers of the college until 1995.

== Motto ==
The Brigidine motto, Fortiter et Suaviter challenges students to be "Women of Strength, Women of Gentleness". These seemingly opposing virtues are in fact complementary notions of moral courage (fortiter) and consideration of others (suaviter). This motto originates from the foundation of the Brigidine Congregation in Ireland by Bishop Daniel Delany in 1807.

== Principals ==
Ordinal	Officeholders	Term start	Term end	Time in office	Notes
1	Romauld Walz	1954	1959	4–5 years	
2	Lawrence Kinkead	1960	1965	4–5 years	
3	Theresita Bonser	1966	1967	0–1 years	
4	Thomas Keating	1968	1970	9–10 years	
5	Valentine McMahon	1971	1975	3–4 years	
6	Val McKenna	1975	1975	0 years	
7	Anita Murray	1975	1989	13–14 years	
8	Helen Connolly	1989	1989	0 years	
9	Joan Smith	1989	1993	3–4 years	
10	Angela Ryan	1994	1995	0–1 years	
11	John Bowie	1996	2005	8–9 years	
12	Joanne Atkins	2006	2009	2–3 years	
13	Johnathan Byrne	2009	2010	0–1 years	
14	Jane Curran	2011	2020	8–9 years	
15	Laetitia Richmond	2020	2024	4–5 years	
16	Shane Hogan	2025	2026	0–1 year	
17	Kate Quinane	2026	Current		

== Campus ==
The current facilities of the college include:

- Multi-purpose International standard competition court.
- The Convent – Administration area, including Reception and Student Services for all Year groups.
- McCammon Wing – Year 11 and 12 classroom and recreation areas, Centre for Excellence, Independent Learning Centre, Senior Study Areas, Student Services (including Counsellors and Youth Minister)
- Gymnasium – Two classrooms; full sized court for netball, basketball, volleyball; change rooms
- Bowie Hall – A 1,000 seat hall for assemblies, functions and performances
- St Brigid's Chapel and Religious Education Centre – Religious Education and Learning Support classrooms and offices; Chapel seating 160 people.
- Romuald Visual Arts Centre – A dedicated Visual Arts Centre with senior studio, three classrooms, sculpture courtyard and multi-media area.
- McMahon Wing – classrooms and courtyard; Textile and Design areas
- Murray Wing – Year 12 Commonroom and courtyard, IT Centre and "Fresh Taste Sensations" Canteen.
- Synan Wing – Classrooms for Years 7–9, offices for Year Co-ordinators.
- Connolly Wing – Ground Floor: Design and Technology workshops.
- Adrian Wing – classrooms
- Anita Murray Centre – Performing Arts and Science facilities including 220 seat Theatre, Drama/Dance studio, music classrooms and practice rooms, band rehearsal room, seven new science laboratories and 7 classrooms.
- Kinkead Library – Library resources; wide reading area; information laboratory; digital library for staff resources.
- College Green – Recreation area for students
- Quadrangle – Shaded recreation area

== Governance ==
In 1999 the college was incorporated as a Company Limited by Guarantee and a board was appointed, with responsibility for governance and leading the college in pursuit of its mission. The board is appointed by the trustees of the Sisters of the Brigidine Congregation. Parents are represented on the college board, as are the Brigidine Sisters and other members of the Catholic educational community. The principal of the college is appointed by the board and is charged with the responsibility of administering the college.

== Notable alumnae ==
- Annette Andre – star of 1960s cult British series, Randall and Hopkirk (Deceased)
- Lisa Hensley – television and movie actress
- Alex Hope – songwriter
- Sarah Stephens – model
- Yerin Ha - star of [Bridgerton], Season 4
- Annelise Hall - musical theatre performer (starred as Sandy in the 2024 national touring production of Grease) and film actress (Isabel in the 2026 Australian black comedy film The Birthday Trip)

== See also ==
- List of non-government schools in New South Wales
