= Galen Catholic College =

Location
- Wangaratta, Victoria; Australia; 36°20′25″S 146°18′32″E

Information
- Type: Independent co-educational day high school
- Mottoes: Faith and Integrity
- Religious affiliations: Roman Catholic; Association of Marist Schools of Australia
- Established: 1887; 139 years ago
- Founder: Brigidine Sisters (as Brigidine Convent Wangaratta)
- School district: Sandhust
- Principal: Shawn Mason
- Years: 7–12
- Affiliations: Catholic Regional Education Wangaratta; Catholic All Schools Sports Association
- Website: www.galen.vic.edu.au

Galen Catholic College is a Roman Catholic co-educational high school located in Wangaratta, Victoria, Australia. The College is affiliated with the Association of Marist Schools of Australia.

== History ==
The college was established in 1974, by the Marist Brothers, as Galen College, a senior campus (Yrs 11 and 12) for both male and female students.

Most of its students came from the long-established St Joseph's Girls College, Ryley St, Wangaratta and Champagnat Boys College, (same venue as Galen College) an agricultural boarding school; these two schools amalgamated and formed the current Galen College in 1980 approximately.

Champagnat College was established in 1955 by the Marist Brothers on the current site in Phillipson St and was a boys only boarding school from Year Seven to Year Twelve students.

By 1983, Galen was operating as a full Year 7–12, co-educational college.

== Sport ==
The school is a member of the Catholic All Schools Sports Association (CAS).

== The school today ==
Galen Catholic College now caters for grades 7 to VCE/VCAL (11 and 12). With 17 buildings on over 5,900 square metres (63,000 sq ft) of educational space, it serves around 1,200 students from Wangaratta and other local districts including Corowa, Rutherglen, Beechworth, Yarrawonga and Moyhu.

== Notable alumni ==
- Daniel Andrews – Former Premier of Victoria
- Baden Cooke – Retired Professional Cyclist

== VFL / AFL Footballers ==
The following students went onto play VFL / AFL senior football, or were drafted, with the year indicating their debut.

- 1962 - Ian Hayden - Richmond
- 1974 - John Moylan - North Melbourne
- 1975 - John Byrne - North Melbourne
- 1981 - Dennis Carroll - South Melbourne
- 1985 - Rohan Robertson - North Melbourne
- 1985 - Shane Robertson - North Melbourne
- 1990 - Chris Naish – Richmond
- 1990 - Tim Rieniets - Carlton
- 2001 - Andrew J Hill - Collingwood
- 2003 - Jarrad Waite – Carlton
- 2005 - Ben Reid – Collingwood
- 2006 - Alipate Carlile - Port Adelaide
- 2010 - Sam Reid – Sydney
- 2014 - Zac O'Brien - Brisbane Lions
- 2024 - Joe Richards – Collingwood
- 2024 - Darcy Wilson – St Kilda

== See also ==
- List of high schools in Victoria
