= Sam Reid (footballer, born 1991) =

Australian rules footballer

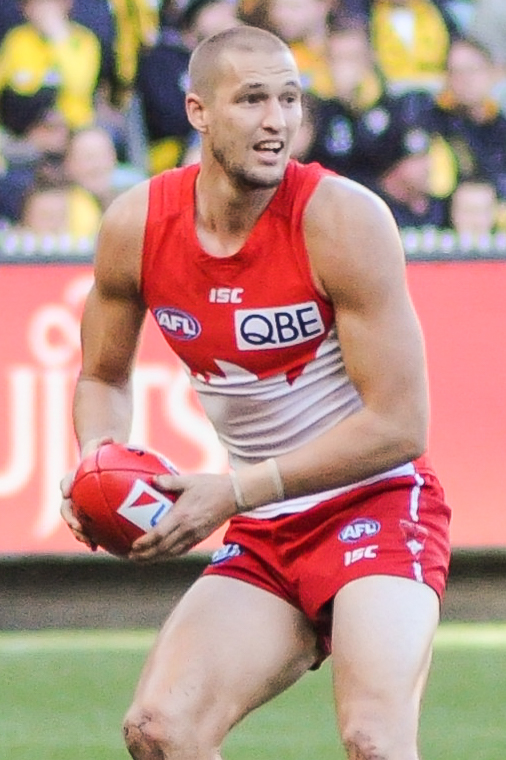
- Reid playing for Sydney in June 2017

Personal information
- Full name: Sam Reid
- Nickname: Reidy
- Born: 27 December 1991 (age 34)
- Original team: Murray Bushrangers (TAC Cup)
- Draft: No. 38, 2009 national draft (Sydney); No. 11, 2024 rookie draft (Sydney)
- Height: 196 cm (6 ft 5 in)
- Weight: 98 kg (216 lb)
- Position: Key forward / ruckman

Playing career^{1}
Years	Club	Games (Goals)
2010–2024	Sydney	181 (183)
- ^{1} Playing statistics correct to the end of the 2022 season.

Career highlights
- Sydney premiership player: 2012; 2011 AFL Rising Star nominee; Goodes-O’Loughlin Medal: 2019

Sam Reid (born 27 December 1991) is a former Australian rules footballer who played for the Sydney Swans in the Australian Football League (AFL). He was drafted to Sydney with the 38th selection in the 2009 AFL draft, becoming a third generation footballer at AFL/VFL level. His grandfather Bruce Reid senior played for Footscray, his father Bruce Reid, for Footscray and Carlton and his uncle John Reid for Melbourne, Footscray and Sydney. He is also the younger brother of Collingwood premiership player Ben Reid.

From Bright, Victoria, Reid played junior football with Wangaratta Rovers before joining the Murray Bushrangers in the TAC Cup.

Reid made one senior appearance in his first season at the Swans, making his debut in Round 22, 2010 against the Brisbane Lions he finished the match with 13 disposals, 8 marks and a goal. In 2011, Reid played all but one game and consistently displayed his athleticism and contested marking ability while playing in one of the most difficult positions on the field, at centre half-forward. In round 12, he was nominated for the 2011 AFL Rising Star after a strong performance against Richmond in which he kicked 2 goals and 5 behinds. Reid showed enormous promise during his first full season in the AFL and was rewarded with Swans Rising Star Award at the club's end of year awards night.

2012 proved to be an up and down year personally for Reid as he continued to come to terms with the greater attention thrust his way from experienced defenders. He kicked a career-high 6 goals against Brisbane Lions at the SCG during a season that culminated with him being part of the Swans' premiership side. He kicked one goal in the 2012 AFL Grand Final victory over Hawthorn.

Reid was selected to play in the 2022 AFL Grand Final, despite having been substituted out of the preliminary final a week earlier with an adductor strain. Reid only managed to played half of the grand final, with limited impact, before being substituted out shortly after half time with a recurrence of the same injury. Sydney's decision to select him was widely criticised by commentators.

In 2024, Reid retired after suffering an injury setback.

== Personal life ==
Reid grew up in Bright in Northeast Victoria, attending, he attended Galen Catholic College for his final years of high school to train with the Murray Bushrangers. Reid married long time girlfriend Kimberley in 2017. Their first child, a boy, Saxon was born in 2019.

== Statistics ==
Updated to the end of the 2023 season.

Legend
G	Goals	K	Kicks	D	Disposals	T	Tackles
B	Behinds	H	Handballs	M	Marks	H/O	Hit-outs
#	Played in that season's premiership team

Season	Team	No.	Games	Totals								Averages (per game)								Votes
Season	Team	No.	Games	G	B	K	H	D	M	T	H/O	G	B	K	H	D	M	T	H/O	Votes
2010	Sydney	20	1	1	1	9	4	13	8	1	0	1.0	1.0	9.0	4.0	13.0	8.0	1.0	0.0	0
2011	Sydney	20	23	22	26	143	97	240	106	45	0	1.0	1.1	6.2	4.2	10.4	4.6	2.0	0.0	0
2012^{#}	Sydney	20	22	31	19	115	91	206	68	43	0	1.4	0.9	5.2	4.1	9.4	3.1	2.0	0.0	2
2013	Sydney	20	10	7	4	61	47	108	38	24	0	0.7	0.4	6.1	4.7	10.8	3.8	2.4	0.0	0
2014	Sydney	20	20	17	9	100	106	206	68	48	46	0.9	0.5	5.0	5.3	10.3	3.4	2.4	2.3	0
2015	Sydney	20	10	3	3	62	63	125	51	22	52	0.3	0.3	6.2	6.3	12.5	5.1	2.2	2.4	2
2016	Sydney	20	0	–	–	–	–	–	–	–	–	–	–	–	–	–	–	–	–	–
2017	Sydney	20	22	30	17	166	115	281	134	30	36	1.4	0.8	7.5	5.2	12.8	6.1	1.4	1.6	3
2018	Sydney	20	1	2	2	11	1	12	6	3	0	2.0	2.0	11.0	1.0	12.0	6.0	3.0	0.0	0
2019	Sydney	20	22	28	13	143	109	252	110	63	126	1.3	0.6	6.5	5.0	11.5	5.0	2.9	5.7	4
2020 (Note: The 2020 season was played with 17 home-and-away matches per team (down from 22) and 16-minute quarters with time on (down from 20-minute quarters with time on) due to the impact of the COVID-19 pandemic.)	Sydney	20	10	5	6	43	41	84	38	16	26	0.5	0.6	4.3	4.1	8.4	3.8	1.6	2.6	0
2021	Sydney	20	10	6	6	62	47	109	45	28	78	0.6	0.6	6.2	4.7	10.9	4.5	2.8	7.8	0
2022	Sydney	20	18	18	20	108	93	201	72	73	126	1.0	1.1	6.0	5.2	11.2	4.0	4.1	7.0	2
2023	Sydney	20	0	–	–	–	–	–	–	–	–	–	–	–	–	–	–	–	–	–
Career			181	183	136	1108	900	2008	821	427	490	1.0	0.8	6.1	5.0	11.1	4.5	2.4	2.7	13

== Honours and achievements ==
Team

- AFL premiership player (Sydney): 2012
- McClelland Trophy (Sydney): 2014, 2016

Individual

- AFL Rising Star nominee: 2011 (round 12)
