= Keith Robertson =

Keith Robertson may refer to:

- Keith Robertson (writer) (1914–1991), American writer of children's books and murder mysteries
- Keith Robertson (rugby union, born 1954), former Scottish rugby union player
- Keith Robertson (Australian footballer) (born 1938), former Australian rules footballer
- Keith Robertson (rugby union coach), rugby player
