= John Reid (Australian footballer) =

Australian rules footballer

Personal information
- Full name: John Reid
- Born: 25 February 1953 (age 73)
- Original team: Romsey
- Height: 185 cm (6 ft 1 in)
- Weight: 73 kg (161 lb)

Playing career^{1}
Years	Club	Games (Goals)
1972, 1974	Melbourne	3 (0)
1975–1981	Footscray	78 (2)
1982–1983	Sydney Swans	10 (2)
Total		91 (4)
- ^{1} Playing statistics correct to the end of 1983.

John Reid (born 25 February 1953) is a former Australian rules footballer who played with Melbourne, Footscray and the Sydney Swans in the Victorian Football League (VFL).

Reid had a slow start to his career, after appearing just once in the 1972 VFL season, he did not play a senior game in 1973 and was used just twice in 1974.

In 1975 he moved to Footscray, the club that his father Bruce Reid senior had played for. A defender, he played just one game in each of his first two seasons.

At the age of 24 he finally put together a sequence of appearances when he played in all but one fixture from round 10 of the 1977 season. He was joined at Footscray by his brother, Bruce Reid junior, in 1977.

For the next four years he was a regular member of the side.

Reid joined the Sydney Swans in 1982, for their first league season after relocating. His contribution to the club as a player was minimal, but he later served the Swans as a reserves coach and football manager.

He is the uncle of Collingwood premiership player Ben Reid and Sydney Swans premiership player Sam Reid.
