= Lavalla Catholic College =

Location
- Newborough & Traralgon, Victoria; Australia; 38°12′03″S 146°30′52″E

Information
- Type: Independent co-educational secondary day school
- Motto: Strong Minds and Compassionate Hearts
- Religious affiliation: Marist Brothers
- Denomination: Roman Catholic
- Established: 1951; 75 years ago
- Oversight: Roman Catholic Diocese of Sale
- Principal: Ryan Greer
- Years: 7–12
- Enrollment: c. 1,200
- Campuses: Traralgon: Kildare (Year 10–Year 12); Traralgon: St. Pauls (Year 7–Year 9); Newborough: Presentation (Year 7–Year 9)
- Houses: MacKillop; Nagle; Champagnat; Delany; Glowrey
- Colors: Navy blue and gold
- School fees: Year 7–9: $7,045; Year 10–12: $7,398
- Affiliation: Association of Marist Schools of Australia; Catholic All Schools Sports Association; Gippsland Independent Schools
- Website: www.lavalla.vic.edu.au

Lavalla Catholic College is a dual-campus independent Roman Catholic co-educational secondary day school, located in the towns of Traralgon and Newborough in the Gippsland region of Victoria, Australia. Currently, the school has approximately 1,200 students enrolled across all campuses.

The College is a member of Association of Marist Schools of Australia and is located in the Diocese of Sale. It is affiliated with Catholic Education Victoria and is a member of the Catholic All Schools Sports Association (CAS).

In honour of St Marcellin Champagnat, the founder of the Marist brothers, each year the college awards Champagnat Medals to staff and students who demonstrate leadership and espouse the college motto "Strong Minds, Compassionate Hearts".

== History ==
The college began in 1951 when the Presentation Sisters established their convent in Moe and began to teach students. Later, St. Paul's College was founded in 1956 on Grey St by the Marist Fathers as an all-boys school. The Marist Brothers assumed responsibility for the administration of St. Paul's in 1962. Also in that year, the Brigidine Sisters established the all-girls school, Kildare College, on the Kosciuszko Street site.

Under the leadership of John McMahon, in 1979 a mini system of three schools was created: Kildare and St Paul's for Year 7–10 and a new senior campus, Lourdes College for Years 11 and 12. In 1989 after the Brigidine Sisters withdrew, the three colleges became one co-educational school called Catholic Regional College with Fons Van Rooij as principal.

In 2001, Catholic Regional College amalgamated with Presentation College Newborough creating Lavalla Catholic College with the founding principal being Julian Casey. In 2005 the first lay principal was appointed, Erica Pregorer. In October 2010 the college bid farewell to the Marist Brothers after 48 years service.

The name Lavalla is a reference to La Valla-en-Gier, a French village that was the location of the first Marist school, opened in 1817. It is not known why the village's name was anglicized to Lavalla by the Australian school's leadership team.

=== Recent history ===
The St. Paul's campus recently completed renovations of the Year 7 Centre, Year 8 open classroom areas as well as the opening of the Le Rozey Centre as an Art facility. The Kildare campus has recently seen the development of the quadrangle and installation of a new external staircase. This campus has also seen a new trades skills centre, purpose built Systems Engineering classrooms, upgrades to the science labs, and a modern canteen.

In 2016, Lavalla Catholic College celebrated 60 Years of Marist education in partnership with Brigidine & Presentation Sisters.

In 2019, Lavalla Catholic College opened new the new Hermitage Administration Centre and Marian Learning Centre.

== Campuses ==
Lavalla has three campuses. The Kildare Campus located on Kosciusko Street, Traralgon is the senior campus with students in Years 10–12. There are two junior campuses home to Years 7–9. The St Paul's campus is located on Grey St, Traralgon and Presentation Campus located at John Field Drive in Newborough. Presentation Campus is currently used for school functions including retreats.

The College offers students are variety of pathways through to Year 12, senior students can select a combination of: VCE, VET, and VCAL to complete their secondary schooling.

== See also ==
- List of non-government schools in Victoria
- Catholic education in Australia
