= Chairo Christian School =

Christian school in Victoria, Australia

Location
- Drouin, Leongatha, Pakenham, Traralgon, Victoria; Australia; 38°8′36″S 145°52′40″E

Information
- Type: Christian
- Motto: Learning with God
- Established: 1983
- Principal: Peter Wells
- Enrolment: approx. 1,900 (K3–12)
- Campuses: Drouin Campus (Yrs 5–12); Drouin East Campus (K3–Yr 4); Pakenham Campus (K3–Yr 12); Leongatha Campus (K3–Yr 12); Traralgon Campus (K3–Yr 8)
- Colours: Navy blue, gold and white
- Website: www.chairo.vic.edu.au

Chairo Christian School is a multi-campus co-educational private, non-denominational Christian School with campuses in Drouin, Victoria, Drouin East, Pakenham, Victoria, Leongatha, Victoria, and Traralgon, Victoria.

Founded in 1983, Chairo currently caters for over 1,700 students from Prep to Year 12 all across Gippsland, with the largest campus being at Pakenham. Chairo Christian School also has a Kindergarten program that caters for children aged 3–4.

According to a statement from its principal, the school teaches both evolution and creationism, though clearly states the school's belief in creationism in such classes.

== History ==
Chairo was founded in 1983 with 19 students and one teacher on the Drouin East Campus, which was the old Drouin East Primary School. This original school building has since been retired, being relocated at Mill Valley Ranch in Tynong, Victoria, in 1999. There are now more than 1,600 students within the campuses. The name "Chairo" comes from the Greek "χαιρω", meaning "Rejoice".

The school's Pakenham Campus began its VCE classes in 2008 and its music curriculum in 2009 with its first production of Seussical the Musical, Peter Pan in 2010 and Barnum in 2011.

== Affiliations ==
Chairo Christian School is affiliated with Independent Schools Victoria (ISV), Christian Education National (CEN) and the Australian Association of Christian Schools (AACC)

Chairo is also part of a variety of Inter-School networks that compete regularly with Sporting and Cultural events. School Sports Victoria (SSV) network, Christian Schools Events Network (CSEN), and the Gippsland Independent Schools Association (GIS), originally competing in Sports and Cultural competitions, now solely Cultural and leadership events and occasions.

== Campuses ==
Chairo Christian School features five campuses. Originally starting with their Drouin East Campus in 1983 then expanding to a Senior Campus in Drouin. In 1998, Chairo expanded into the Pakenham area facilitating a large expansion becoming the largest campus. In 2014 the School took management of a new Leongatha Campus originally starting in 1978 called South Coast Christian College. In 2018, the Traralgon Campus originally a campus of Flinders Christian Community College, becoming the latest member of the Chairo family.

- Drouin Campus – Drouin (Years 5–12)
- Drouin East Campus (Kindergarten to Year 4)
- Pakenham Campus (Kindergarten to Year 12)
- Leongatha Campus (Kindergarten to Year 12)
- Traralgon Campus (Kindergarten to Year 8)

== House system ==
In 1995, the house system was originally introduced to the Drouin Senior Campus initially with under twenty students in each House. The Drouin Houses were named after iconic Christian Missionaries which included Aylward House (blue), named after Gladys Aylward. Elliot House (red), named after Jim Elliot. Flynn House (green), named after John Flynn and Liddell House (yellow), named after Eric Liddell. After the introduction of a third campus in Pakenham, a new house system was introduced named after founding families of the school. This included Ballantyne (blue), Hughes (yellow), Knowles (red) and Noordermeer (green). In the Leongatha campus, three Houses were established in 2014 with three Houses named Banksia (red), Bluegum (blue) and Wattle (yellow), named after fauna found in Australia.

During House events such as Athletics and Swimming at the Drouin Campus, the Leongatha (orange) and Traralgon (purple) Campus participate as two additional Houses, regardless of their respected Houses interior to the campuses.

== Curriculum ==
Chairo offers its Years 11 and 12 students the Victorian Certificate of Education (VCE), the main assessment program which ranks the students in the state, as well as the Victorian Certificate of Applied Learning (VCAL).

== Co-curriculum ==
=== Sport ===
Hockey

Chairo has a strong history in Field Hockey. In 2022 and 2023 the Senior Girls team won the State School Victoria (SSV) hockey championships. Their girls intermediate team also won it in 2019 and were runner up in 2018. In 2022 after playing for the Victorian State School team at the Australian Championships in Tasmania, Bianca Zurrer was named in the All Australian Team. Bianca Zurrer and Marisah Mock represented Victoria in the National Under 18 Hockey Championships on the Gold Coast in 2024. They lost to Queensland 2-1 in the Grand Final where afterwards Bianca Zurrer was named player of the tournament. As a result she was named in the squad for HC Melbourne which plays in Australia national league called Hockey One. On November 15, 2024 she made her debut for HC Melbourne and helped them to a win against Canberra Chill in Canberra.

==== Netball ====
Chairo Christian School won the Boys Division in the International Schools Netball Championships in 2011

=== Performing arts ===
==== Music ====
Chairo Christian School offers at all its campuses a sophisticated and engaging music curriculum which includes a variety of music genres and styles from concert band, choir and worship bands. The Pakenham Campus' popular Music On The Lawn is special event held yearly on the lawn of the campus gardens which showcases the talent of students throughout all year levels.

The Drouin, Leongatha and Traralgon campuses compete against one another alongside other GIS schools at the annual 'MuseArtz' festival.

==== Theatre ====
At Chairo Christian School, each senior campus has a strong theatrical presence in holding concerts and musical productions either yearly or biyearly, holding other theatrical events in between like the popular 'Out There' in Secondary at the Drouin Campus, or 'Cabaret' at the Leongatha Campus.

Notable Chairo productions include Fiddler on the Roof, Sound of Music, Beauty and the Beast each held at the West Gippsland Arts Centre. With the recent building of a Cultural Centre, 'The Balfour', Chairo now has the capacity to hold musicals and productions all year round.

===== Pakenham =====
At Chairo Christian School’s Pakenham Campus, a full-scale musical is staged every first year by the Middle School and Senior School. Recent productions have included The Pajama Game, Leader of the Pack, Oliver!, and Esther (based on the biblical story). In alternate years, the Junior School presents its own musical, with recent performances including Alibaba and the Bongo Bandits, Jonah’s Druthers (filmed due to COVID restrictions), The Lion King Jr., and Peter Pan.

== Notable alumni ==
- Emma Gunn ('13), Player for the Victorian Women's Premier League Soccer, Sandringham
- Anthony Mcdonald-Tipungwuti ('12), AFL player for Essendon
