= Traralgon Post Office and Court House =

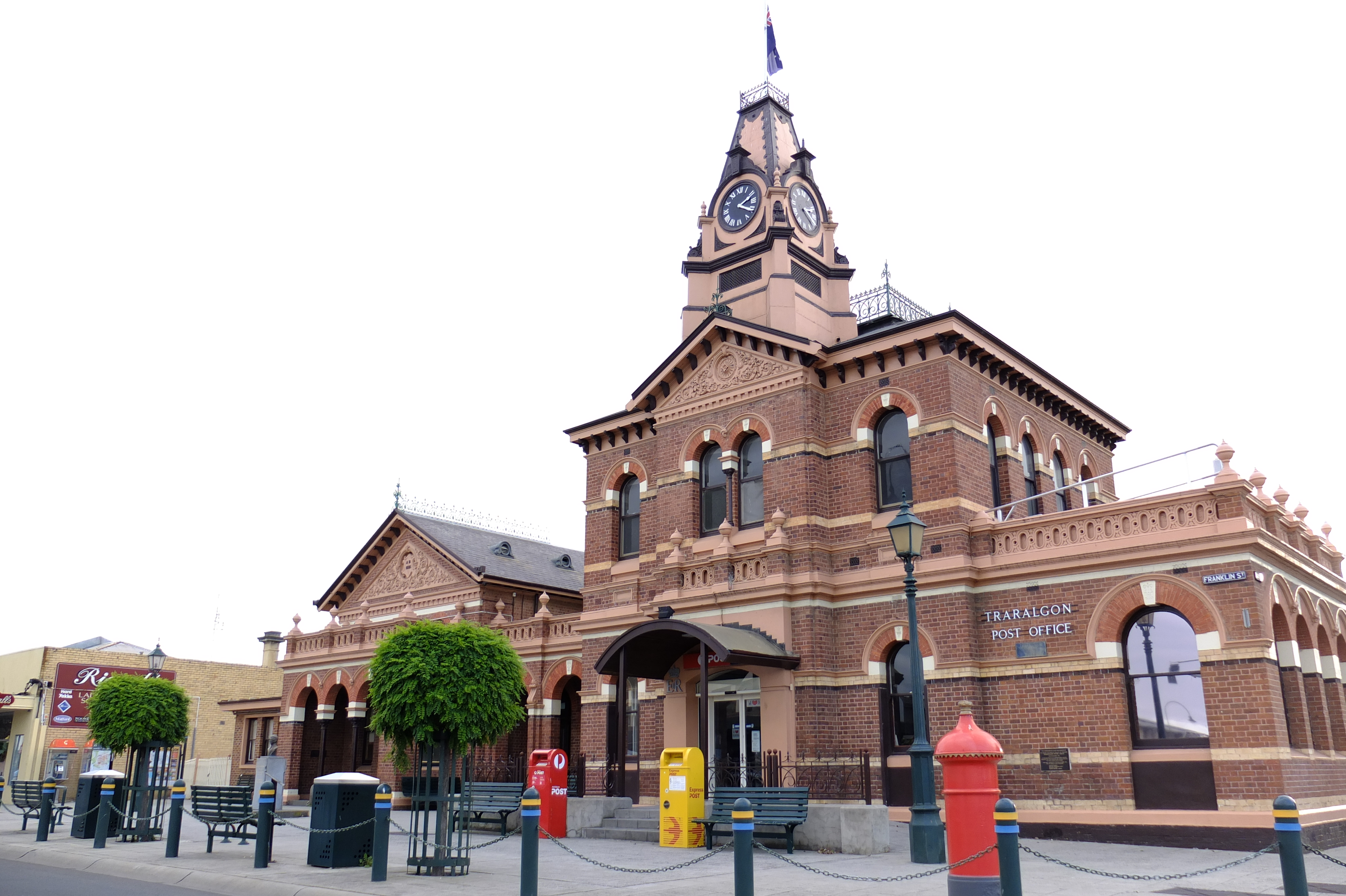

- Location within Victoria
- 38.1951°S 146.5378°E
- Location: 161–169 Franklin Street, Traralgon, Victoria, Australia

Commonwealth Heritage List
- Official name: Traralgon Post Office
- Type: Listed place (Historic)
- Designated: 8 November 2011
- Reference no.: 106141

Victorian Heritage Register
- Reference no.: VHR H1488

Traralgon Post Office and Court House is a heritage-listed post office and former court house complex at 161–169 Franklin Street, Traralgon, Victoria, Australia. It was designed by John Thomas Kelleher and J. R. Brown of the colonial Department of Public Works and built in 1886. The entire building was added to the Victorian Heritage Register on 20 August 1982, with the federally-owned post office wing also being listed on the Australian Commonwealth Heritage List on 8 November 2011.

== History ==
The Traralgon court house and post office complex was designed by Department of Public Works' architect J. T. Kelleher and constructed in 1886. It also included Colonial government offices in the form of a sub-treasury. Prior to this, the region's mail services and the Court of Petty Sessions had operated variously from the rear of the Traralgon Hotel (formerly Campbell's Traveller's Rest) and Kate Campbell's residence in Kay Street. The operation of postal services from the new postal building was commenced in May 1887.

When it opened, the main entrance to the post office complex was from Kay Street with a full length counter. Living quarters for the Post Master were above the post office, with the private entrance also being in Kay Street. Folding stairs in an ante-room provided access to the platform surrounding the clock tower, from which views of the town and surrounds could be obtained.

The installation of the clock in the tower in 1892 was the achievement of the local Progress Association. and a telephone exchange was installed in 1920. The Kay Street loggia was enlarged c. 1920 by extending northwards to Kay Street; this arrangement included single door openings from both Kay and Franklin Streets. This work probably involved the installation of a new counter area between the former loggia space and post office, internalising a public space for postal transactions. A ground floor window opening in the Franklin Street elevation (adjacent to the projecting bay) had been converted to provide a door opening by 1925. The picket fence had been removed from the court house frontage by 1940, and The clock faces were lit in 1948.

Major works to the post office wing in 1965–66 included the relocation of main entrance to Franklin Street centre bay. These works involved demolition of the central pair of ground floor windows and construction of a door opening with a pair of aluminium-framed doors, curved steel-framed awning and concrete access ramps. Other major works included the complete demolition of the original rear quarters wing and construction of a large mail room wing with loggia facing Kay Street containing multiple banks of private letter boxes and public telephone booths. Other works included brick infill to original and 1920s door openings in corner bay; overpainting of rendered dressings; replacement of original slate roofing with corrugated galvanised steel; removing gablet vents and replacement of original clock mechanism with electric drive.

The clock hands were replaced with stronger hands and the Roman figures repainted in 1982-85. Electric chimes were installed in the clock in 1994.

The Traralgon Magistrates' Court was abolished from December 1989, with single-court local courts having increasingly fallen out of favour; it was replaced with a multi-court regional Magistrates' Court, initially based in Moe. The courthouse wing sat vacant for several years until it briefly reopened as a court for the Family Court of Australia in 1993, after which it again sat vacant.

In 1995, a Delivery Centre was established off-site and the 1960s mail centre wing was converted to a separate tenancy. The post office was refurbished throughout the ground floor areas. Refurbishment works included ceramic tiling of public space, recarpeting, new display systems, new counter joinery, installation of plasterboard ceilings and cornices, new lighting. Works to the first floor appear to be limited to the provision of a small kitchenette in the former lunch and meeting room.

The "Friends of Traralgon Court House" community group was named caretakers of the vacant courthouse wing in 2017, after which the section underwent further repairs in 2017–18, including the repair of a leaking roof which was inhibiting its potential use. It was reported in 2018 that the group aimed to refurbish the courthouse as a community space, while the City of Latrobe hoped to use a later addition to the courthouse wing for commercial purposes. In 2019, the Friends of Traralgon Court House organised an exhibition in the courthouse wing for Anzac Day.

== Description ==
Traralgon Post Office and Court House is at 161–169 Franklin Street, Traralgon, comprising the whole of Lot 1D/2/3647.

The post office is on a nearly flat site at the corner of Kay and Franklin Streets. This is the primary administrative street in Traralgon, though the two main roads through the city are Tyers Road, one block north, and Princes Street, three blocks to the south. In Kay Street the post office site is diagonally opposite the Shire and City offices, and the post office fronts a roadside park to the immediate north. The title, which was originally rectangular, is now essentially L-shaped which reflects the subdivision of the post office and courthouse components.

The central mass is symmetrical on the three street sides, with a mansarded clock tower and a platform roof immediately behind it, framed with a cast iron balustrade as a widow's walk. The clock tower is clad with pressed metal sheet, which makes it read as distinct from the rest of the building. The tower has angled corner buttresses and the clock faces are placed as dormers directly in front of the mansard, both these elements heightening the mansard's baroque referencing. Each clock face has a small pyramidal finial. The roof is clad in slate tile with galvanised iron ridge capping, and supported by a weighty bracketed timber cornice above tuckpointed salmon-coloured face brick walls.

The east elevation, facing Franklin Street, is marked by a breakfront with a finialled pediment above it. The tympanum is vigorously ornamented in a floral pattern with a central circular vent and surmounted by a continuing line of cornice brackets. The main windows facing the street are all double-hung sashes in stilted round arches, the arches being picked out at the keystone and springing points with accentuated dressings. These act to give the arches a pointed impression, hinting at the Florentine combination of pointed over round arches. Each storey has two prominent moulded string courses and a substantial base battered out from the wall in several steps. This is accentuated by a projecting panel under each upper side window facing Franklin Street, and by a further breakfront over the Franklin Street entrance, topped with urns - a favourite early device in Queen Anne free style usage.

The main entrance bay is a conversion of an original window bay, associated with the reorientation of the interior in the 1960s which included a steel-framed awning, concrete ramps and aluminium-framed doors. All ground floor windows were supported on recessed spandrels originally, giving the impression of full-height windows. One of the upstairs windows, facing south toward Seymour Street, has been left blind. The original double-storey north elevation of the main building is fronted by a single-storey, double-fronted bay; the present form, dating from the 1920s, replaced the original arcaded loggia. The 1920s pattern of fenestration included a single arched door opening to Franklin Street and three arched window openings and a door opening to Kay Street; the two door openings have since been converted to windows. The bay has a parapeted flat roof, fronted with a balustrade of miniature ovals outlined in rendered cement and interspersed with piers topped with urns. A generally similar treatment tops the still open loggia connecting the post office to the neighbouring courthouse.

The 1960s Kay Street wing is almost fully glazed with non-original shopfront glazing to the street and has an additional pavilion at its west end facing a right of way. This wing contains a retail tenancy with timber-framed partitions but was originally a single large volume. At the rear of this transverse part is a 1960s amenities wing, linked to the main post office by a rear verandah. This is a later addition with louvred windows and several lean-to extensions in brick, framing a concreted courtyard with a large roll-a-door loading bay behind the post office retail area.

The courthouse itself is a rectangular, temple-like, single-storey mass behind its Franklin Street loggia, with a floral ornamented pediment and exposed brick walls similar to those of the post office.

There are two levels to the main postal section, and one to the original loggia wing, rear wing and court house.

== Condition ==
Despite a number of phases of change to the external form of the building, including the enlargement of the Kay Street loggia wing in the 1920s, the replacement of the original quarters wing in the 1960s, and reorientation of the main entrance, the external integrity of the original post office and associated courthouse complex is very good.

Internally, the intactness of the original form and fabric has been substantially compromised by a number of changes to the program and extensive refurbishment.

The overall condition of the building appears generally sound and reasonably well maintained, with the exception of damp which is evident in the post office public hall. There are a small number of sections of brickwork which require repointing.

== Heritage listing ==
Traralgon Post Office was listed on the Australian Commonwealth Heritage List on 8 November 2011 with the following rationale:

Traralgon Post Office, constructed in 1886 as a combined court house, post office and sub-treasury complex, has been of considerable historical importance to Traralgon, a major regional centre of the Latrobe Valley in eastern Victoria. The scale and quality of the post office and court house complex, with its inherent landmark qualities and key siting, emphasises the significant role of Traralgon as the communications and administrative centre of the region during the 1880s and after.

Traralgon Post Office has an uncommon multiplicity of functions and is one of a small group of post and telegraph offices and residence which was combined with a court house, Colonial offices and sub-treasury. Despite a number of alterations and phases of refurbishment, the original composition is still highly evident externally, including the distinct building components.

Typologically, and although subject to some alteration, Traralgon Post Office remains an uncommon example of a composite public service building with a range of original functions including an integrated court house. While the separate building components are conceived as distinct units, they are also unified by the common use of overall building form and detail, frontal loggias and integrated planning. Stylistically, the Traralgon Post Office complex is a large scale and flamboyant transitional design combining rich Victorian detailing fused with the freer language of Federation Queen Anne and Romanesque styles.

Architecturally, Traralgon Post Office is an example of the Public Works Department architects, J. R. Brown and J. T. Kelleher. The liberated design is characteristic of the transitional and varied approach of the Department, following the departure of William Wardell and marking the lead up to the Federation period. Traralgon Post Office is an excellent example of a large-scale public building complex in the Late Victorian Italianate style fused with transitional free-Romanesque and Queen Anne characteristics, typical of the Federation period. It is one of, if not the most, prominent nineteenth century elements in the central Traralgon streetscape and, as such, forms a widely-known regional landmark.

Traralgon Post Office gains aesthetic weight from a very well handled meshing of integrated, yet distinct, functions into a finely composed asymmetrical design. This is further enhanced by the complex fusion of layers of Victorian Italianate with free-Romanesque and Queen Anne form and details. Traralgon Post Office has been a key and prominent component of the historic townscape for 120 years and is a widely known symbol which is identified with the town's development and prospective future. The post office building is also locally valued for its combination of public and administrative functions, within a richly detailed building of high architectural and aesthetic value.

The curtilage includes the title block/allotment of the property.

The significant components of Traralgon Post Office include the main postal building of 1886 and the extension of the loggia to Kay Street undertaken in the 1920s.
