= Bruce Reid Jr. =

Australian rules footballer

Personal information
- Full name: Bruce Maxwell Reid Jr.
- Born: 23 December 1955 (age 70)
- Original team: Sandhurst
- Height: 192 cm (6 ft 4 in)
- Weight: 96 kg (212 lb)
- Position: Defender

Playing career^{1}
Years	Club	Games (Goals)
1977–1982	Footscray	86 (23)
1983–1985	Carlton	33 (3)
Total		119 (26)
- ^{1} Playing statistics correct to the end of 1985.

Bruce Reid (born 23 December 1955) is a former Australian rules footballer who played with Footscray and Carlton in the Victorian Football League (VFL). Reid made his league debut against St Kilda in round 5 of the 1977 season. His father Bruce Reid Sr. and brother John Reid were also league footballers. Reid's two sons, Ben and Sam, also played in the AFL, with each winning a premiership with their respective clubs, Collingwood and Sydney, in 2010 and 2012.
