= 2011 All-Australian team =

The 2011 All-Australian team represents the best performed Australian Football League (AFL) players during the 2011 season. The team was announced on 19 September as a complete Australian rules football team of 22 players. The team is honorary and does not play any games.

== Selection panel ==
The selection panel for the 2011 All-Australian team consisted of chairman Andrew Demetriou, Adrian Anderson, Kevin Bartlett, Luke Darcy, Danny Frawley, Glen Jakovich, Leigh Matthews and Mark Ricciuto.

== Team ==
=== Initial squad ===
An initial squad of 40 players was previously announced on 6 September.

Club	Total	Player(s)
Adelaide	1	Scott Thompson
Brisbane Lions	0	
Carlton	4	Eddie Betts, Chris Judd, Marc Murphy, Heath Scotland
Collingwood	6	Travis Cloke, Leon Davis, Scott Pendlebury, Ben Reid, Dane Swan, Dale Thomas
Essendon	0	
Fremantle	2	Nathan Fyfe, Luke McPharlin
Geelong	6	Corey Enright, Steve Johnson, James Kelly, Matthew Scarlett, Joel Selwood, Harry Taylor
Gold Coast	1	Gary Ablett Jr.
Hawthorn	4	Grant Birchall, Lance Franklin, Josh Gibson, Sam Mitchell
Melbourne	0	
North Melbourne	4	Todd Goldstein, Drew Petrie, Andrew Swallow, Daniel Wells
Port Adelaide	0	
Richmond	1	Brett Deledio
St Kilda	3	Nick Dal Santo, Sam Fisher, Stephen Milne
Sydney	1	Adam Goodes
West Coast	5	Dean Cox, Andrew Embley, Darren Glass, Josh Kennedy, Matt Priddis
Western Bulldogs	2	Matthew Boyd, Robert Murphy

=== Final team ===
2011 All-Australian team
B:	Matthew Scarlett (Geelong)	Darren Glass (West Coast)	Corey Enright (Geelong)
HB:	Robert Murphy (Western Bulldogs)	Ben Reid (Collingwood)	Leon Davis (Collingwood)
C:	Dale Thomas (Collingwood)	Sam Mitchell (Hawthorn)	Scott Pendlebury (Collingwood)
HF:	Marc Murphy (Carlton)	Travis Cloke (Collingwood)	Dane Swan (Collingwood)
F:	Stephen Milne (St Kilda)	Lance Franklin (Hawthorn)	Adam Goodes (Sydney)
Foll:	Dean Cox (West Coast)	Chris Judd (Carlton) (vice-captain)	Gary Ablett Jr. (Gold Coast) (captain)
Int:	Matthew Boyd (Western Bulldogs)	Nick Dal Santo (St Kilda)	James Kelly (Geelong)
Int:	Drew Petrie (North Melbourne)		
Coach:	Chris Scott (Geelong)		

Note: the position of coach in the All-Australian team is traditionally awarded to the coach of the premiership team.
