= Catholic All Schools Sports Association =

Group of Catholic schools in Australia

- Formation: 1997
- Headquarters: Coburg, Victoria, Australia
- Members: 84 member schools
- General Secretary: Mr. Rory Kennedy (MacKillop College, Werribee)
- Website: cassport.org.au

The Catholic All Schools Sports Association (CAS) is a group of Catholic schools in Victoria, Australia. The Association was formed on 11 November 1996 and provides the basis for interschool sporting and other competitions between the member schools. CAS was formerly known as Victorian Catholic Schools Sports Association (VCSSA).

== Aims ==
To provide high level competition in a range of sports within the context of the spirit and ethos of Catholic Education.

To provide opportunities for students in Catholic Secondary Colleges to participate in State Level Championships across a range of Sports.

To provide the opportunity for students in Catholic Secondary Colleges to compete in Victorian All Schools Championships across a range of Sports.

To recognise the achievements of sporting excellence in Catholic Secondary Colleges.

== Schools ==
=== Current member schools ===
- Academy of Mary Immaculate, Fitzroy (1997)
- Aquinas College, Ringwood (1997)
- Catholic Regional College, Drysdale (1997)
- Catholic Regional College, Melton (1997)
- Catholic Regional College, North Keilor (1997)
- Catholic Regional College, St. Albans (1997)
- Catholic Regional College, Sydenham (1997)
- Emmanuel College, Warrnambool (1999)
- FCJ College Benalla (1999)
- Galen College, Wangaratta (1997)
- Lavalla College (formerly Catholic Regional College, Traralgon) (1997)
- MacKillop College, Swan Hill (1997)
- MacKillop College, Werribee (1997)
- Marcellin College, Bulleen (1998)
- Marian College, Ararat (1999)
- Marian College, Myrtleford (1999)
- Mater Christi college, Belgrave (1999)
- McAuley College, Dooboobetic (1997)
- Mercy Diocesan College, Coburg (1997)
- Mercy Regional College, Camperdown (1998)
- Mount Lilydale Mercy College, Mount Lilydale (1997)
- Nagle College, Bairnsdale (1997)
- Nazareth College, Noble Park North (1999)
- Our Lady of Mercy College, Heidelberg (1997)
- Penola Catholic College, Broadmeadows (1999)
- Sacred Heart College, Geelong (1997)
- Sacred Heart College, Kyneton (1998)
- Sacred Heart College, Yarrawonga (1999)
- Santa Maria College, Northcote (1997)
- St Augustine's College, Kyabram (1998)
- St Brigid's College, Horsham (2001)
- St Joseph's College, Ferntree Gully (2000 or 2001)
- St Joseph's College, Mildura (1998)
- St Joseph's College, Geelong (1999)
- St Mary's College (Seymour) (1999)
- St Monica's College, Epping (1997)
- St Patrick's College, Ballarat (2007)
- St Peter's College, Cranbourne (1998 and from 2000 or 2001
- Thomas Carr College, Tarneit (1999)
- Trinity College, Colac (1997–1998 and from 2000 or 2001)

==== Sandhurst Secondary Schools Sports Association ====
- Catholic College Bendigo (1997)
- Catholic College, Wodonga (1997)
- Notre Dame College, Shepparton (1997)
- St Joseph's College, Echuca (1997 and from 1999 to 19200?)
- St Mary of the Angels College, Nathalia (1999)
- monivae college

=== Former member schools ===
- Ave Maria College, Essendon (2000 or 2001-2001)
- Avila College Mount Waverley (1999)
- Caroline Chisholm College, Braybrook (1998)
- Catholic College, Sale (1997–2001)
- Clonard College, Geelong (1998–2001)
- Damascus College, Ballarat (1997–1999 or 2001)
- Emmanuel College, Warrnambool (1997)
- Emmaus College, Forest Hill (1997)
- Kilbreda College, Mentone (1997–1999 or 2000)
- Loreto College, Ballarat (1997–1999 or 2000)
- Loreto Mandeville Hall, Toorak (1998–1999 or 2000)
- Loyola College, Watsonia (1997–1999 or 2000)
- Marian College, Ararat (1997)
- Marist-Sion College, Warragul (1999–2001)
- Mary MacKillop College, Leongatha (1998–2001)
- Mazenod College, Mulgrave (1997–1999 or 2000)
- Monivae College, Hamilton (1997–1999 or 2000)
- NCSSA Sandhurst, Colleges (1997–1998)
- Parade College, Bundoora (1997–1999 or 2000)
- Padua College, Mornington (1997–1998)
- Presentation College, Moe (1997–1999 or 2000)
- Redden College Preston (1999)
- St Bede's College, Mentone (1997–1999 or 2000)
- St Bernard's College, Essendon (1997–1998)
- St Columba's College, Essendon (1998–1999 or 2000)
- St. Francis Xavier College, Beaconsfield (1997)
- St John's Regional College, Dandenong (1998–1999 or 2000)
- St Joseph's College, Newtown (1997)
- St Joseph's College, North Melbourne (1997)
- St Joseph's College, Pascoe Vale (1997)
- St Kevin's College, Toorak (1997)
- Sacré Cœur School, Glen Iris (1999-1999 or 2000)
- Sacred Heart Girls' College, Oakleigh (1998–2001)
- Simonds College, North Melbourne (1998–1999)
- Star of the Sea College, Gardenvale (1997–1998)
- Trinity Regional College Brunswick (2000 or 2001-2001)
- Vaucluse College, Richmond (1999-1999 or 2000)
- Whitefriars College, Donvale (1998)
- Xavier College, Kew (1999-1999 or 2000)

== Sports ==
- Athletics
- Aust Rules Football
- Badminton
- Baseball
- Basketball
- Cricket
- Cross Country
- Diving
- Football (Soccer)
- Golf
- Hockey
- Netball
- Indoor Soccer (Futsal)
- Lawn Bowls
- Softball
- Swimming
- Table Tennis
- Tennis
- Touch Football
- Triathlon
- Volleyball

== See also ==
- List of schools in Victoria

== External links and references ==
- Catholic All Schools
