= Anthony McDonald-Tipungwuti =

Australian rules footballer (born 1993)

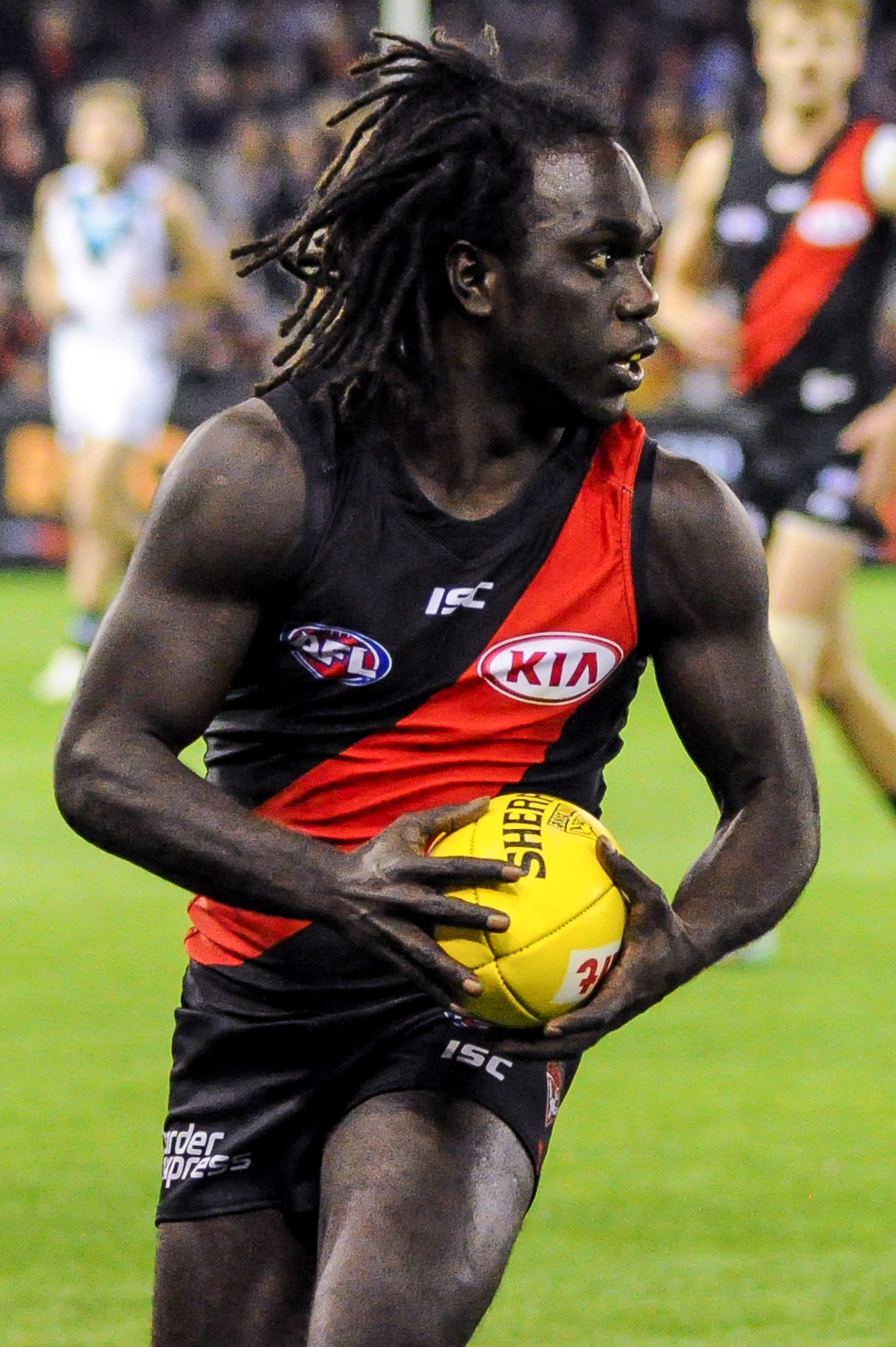
- McDonald-Tipungwuti playing in June 2017

Personal information
- Full name: Anthony William Watson McDonald-Tipungwuti
- Nicknames: Walla, Tippa
- Born: 22 April 1993 (age 33) melbourne
- Original teams: Tiwi Bombers (NTFL); Gippsland Power (TAC Cup); Essendon reserves (VFL)
- Draft: No. 22, 2015 rookie draft
- Height: 171 cm (5 ft 7 in)
- Weight: 82 kg (181 lb)
- Position: Forward

Playing career^{1}
Years	Club	Games (Goals)
2016–2023	Essendon	133 (157)
- ^{1} Playing statistics correct to the end of 2023.

Career highlights
- Essendon leading goalkicker: 2020

Anthony William Watson McDonald-Tipungwuti (born 22 April 1993) is a former professional Australian rules football player for the Essendon Football Club in the Australian Football League (AFL). He was drafted by Essendon with their second selection in the 2015 rookie draft.

== Early life ==
Born as Anthony Tipungwuti on the Tiwi Islands into an Indigenous Australian family, off the coast of Darwin, Anthony was raised on Melville Island. He played his junior football for the Tiwi Bombers in the Northern Territory Football League. Tipungwuti represented the Northern Territory at the U18 National Championships in both 2011 and 2012.

In 2011, he moved to Victoria at the age of 17—not being able to read or write, and speaking only a "bit of English"—to better his chances of an AFL career. He was adopted by Jane McDonald in Gippsland and took on her name as recognition of her contribution to his journey, joining the family as the youngest brother. Anthony attended school at Chairo Christian School in Drouin after moving to Victoria where he learnt to speak English. He spent six years playing for the Gippsland Power in the TAC Cup and Essendon's reserves team in the VFL before realising his dream when he was rookie listed by Essendon at the end of 2015.

== AFL career ==
Following the many suspensions handed out to Essendon players at the end of 2015 for the supplements controversy fallout, McDonald-Tipungwuti was elevated to the Bombers' senior list. He made his AFL debut in Round 1 of the 2016 season against the Gold Coast Suns at Metricon Stadium, and he retained his position in the team until his retirement. In July 2020, he broke the record for most consecutive AFL games for Essendon in the AFL era. His streak ended at 126 games when he decided not to play in Round 22, 2021, for personal reasons.

McDonald-Tipungwuti has finished in the top 10 for the Crichton Medal, Essendon's best-and-fairest award, each season of his career—5th in 2018; 7th in 2016, 2017, and 2020; 8th in 2019; and 10th in 2021 despite not playing in the club's final three games. He was also Essendon’s leading goalkicker in the shortened 2020 season, with 19 goals.

McDonald-Tipungwuti announced his retirement on 20 May 2022; however, he revoked the announcement on 10 November 2022. After a comeback season in 2023, he announced his retirement for good on 24 August 2023, playing his last game, a loss against Collingwood, the following day.

== Statistics ==
Statistics correct as of the end of the 2023 season

Legend
G	Goals	K	Kicks	D	Disposals	T	Tackles
B	Behinds	H	Handballs	M	Marks

Season	Team	No.	Games	Totals							Averages (per game)						
Season	Team	No.	Games	G	B	K	H	D	M	T	G	B	K	H	D	M	T
2016	Essendon	43	21	8	9	186	127	313	89	67	0.4	0.4	8.9	6.0	14.9	4.2	3.2
2017	Essendon	43	23	34	17	179	121	300	78	84	1.5	0.7	7.8	5.3	13.0	3.4	3.7
2018	Essendon	43	22	26	14	160	110	270	75	99	1.2	0.6	7.3	5.0	12.3	3.4	4.5
2019	Essendon	43	23	32	13	166	97	263	66	99	1.4	0.6	7.2	4.2	11.4	2.9	4.3
2020 (Note: The 2020 season was played with 17 home-and-away matches per team (down from 22) and 16-minute quarters with time on (down from 20-minute quarters with time on) due to the impact of the COVID-19 pandemic.)	Essendon	43	17	19	7	86	61	147	35	57	1.1	0.4	5.1	3.6	8.7	2.1	3.6
2021	Essendon	43	20	34	14	129	72	201	49	56	1.7	0.7	6.5	3.6	10.1	2.5	2.8
2022	Essendon	43	0	—	—	—	—	—	—	—	—	—	—	—	—	—	—
2023	Essendon	43	7	4	5	27	23	50	15	15	0.6	0.7	3.9	3.3	7.1	2.1	2.1
Career			133	157	79	933	611	1544	407	477	1.2	0.6	7.0	4.6	11.6	3.1	3.6
