= Traralgon =

- City
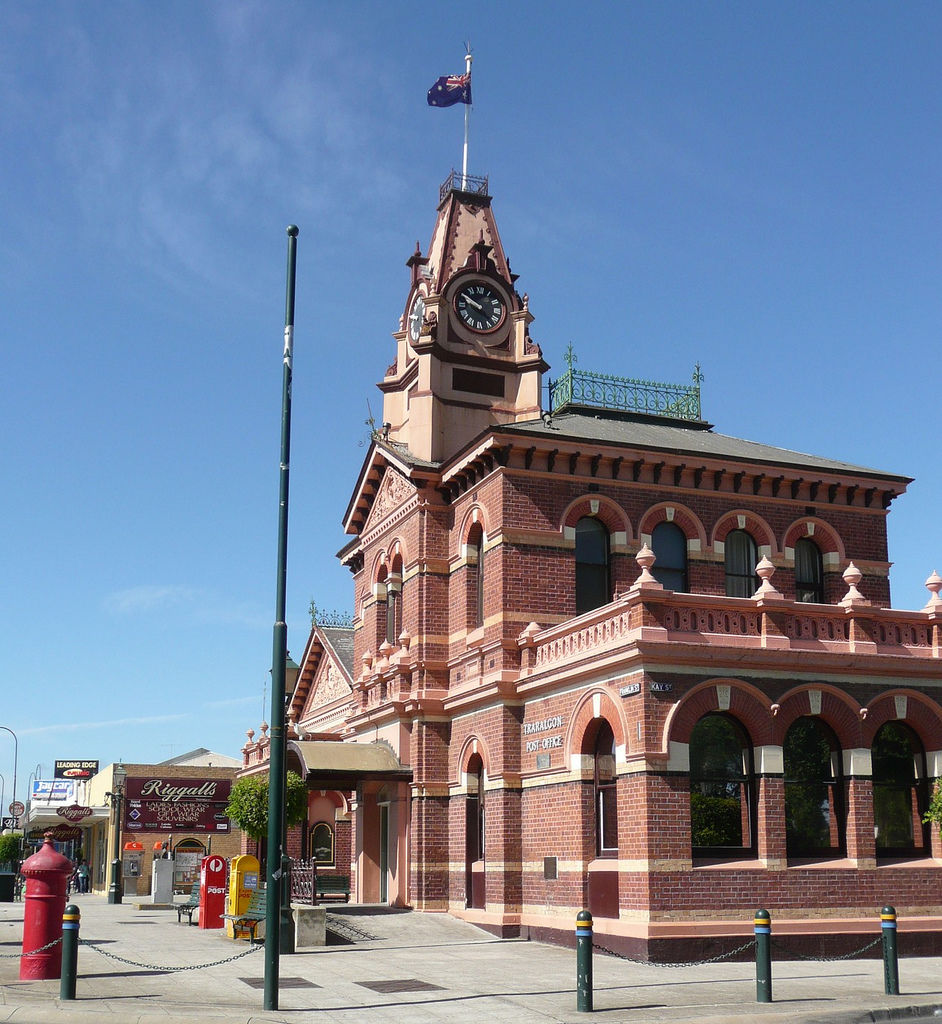
- Traralgon Post Office and Court House, a heritage-listed landmark in the city.

- Coordinates: 38°11′45″S 146°32′25″E
- Country: Australia
- State: Victoria
- LGA: City of Latrobe
- Location: 51 km (32 mi) from Sale; 164 km (102 mi) from Melbourne; 119 km (74 mi) from Bairnsdale
- Established: 1840s

Government
  - State electorate: Morwell
  - Federal division: Gippsland

Area
  - Total: 23.9 km^{2} (9.2 sq mi)
- Elevation (45–75m): 60 m (200 ft)

Population
  - Total: 26,907 (2021 census)
  - Density: 1,125.8/km^{2} (2,916/sq mi)
- Postcode: 3844
- County: Australia
Localities around Traralgon
Tyers	Glengarry	Traralgon East
Yallourn North	Traralgon	Traralgon East
Morwell	Hazelwood North	Hazelwood North

Traralgon (/trərælɡən/ trəh-RAL-gən, locally /təˈrælɡən/ tə-RAL-gən) is a city located in the east of the Latrobe Valley in the Gippsland region of Victoria, Australia and the most populous city in the City of Latrobe and the region. The urban population of Traralgon at the 2021 census was 26,907. It is the largest and fastest growing city in the greater Latrobe Valley area, which has a population of 77,168 at the 2021 Census and is administered by the City of Latrobe.

== Naming ==
The origin of the name Traralgon is unconfirmed. The name was used for the pastoral lease of the Hobson brothers in 1844, centred on Traralgon Creek, and was alternatively rendered 'Tralgon' by Dr Edumund Hobson. The town was also spelt "Taralgon" in the earliest records of the Gippsland Times available in 1861.

The Gippsland Farmers' Journal wrote in 1889 that the town name was originally spelt 'Tarralgon' and that it was the Indigenous name for 'the river of little fish'. However, these words are not reflected in modern linguists' knowledge of Gunai/Kurnai language. Records of the language show that the words wun wun or wurn wurn mean 'river', the words dala or tarlo mean 'little', while the words kine or kain mean 'fish'. It might be possible to combine words into tarlo-kain, which sounds similar to 'Traralgon', but no such compound word was recorded.

In 1989, Don Macreadie wrote that Paweł Strzelecki named Traralgon after Taralga, the hometown of Charlie Tarra, but the statement lacks evidence.

== History ==
Traralgon is situated on the traditional lands of the Indigenous Gunai/Kurnai nation, which includes the lands of the Braiakaulung clan of Bunjil Kraura, who lived to the north of Latrobe River (called Durt'yowan in Gunai language), as well as the clan of Woollum-Woollum, who lived on the hills to the south of the river and were more affiliated with the Brataualung people.

Gunai/Kurnai people manufactured stone tools, as long as 5,000 years ago, from silcrete quarries in the Haunted Hills, west of Morwell. Scarred trees and rock sites with axe-grinding grooves are also found in the local area. The Gippsland region was inhabited by the Gunai/Kurnai people for a period in excess of 20,000 years, according to evidence of occupation found at the New Guinea II cave near Buchan, Victoria. In other parts of Victoria evidence of Indigenous occupation has been found for many more thousands of years.

=== Expeditions ===
The first non-Indigenous visitors to the area of Traralgon included the party of Count Paweł Strzelecki on their journey from the Snowy Mountains in April 1840, after Strzelecki had named Australia's highest peak as Mount Kosciuszko. Charley Tarra, a Burra Burra man from the NSW town of Taralga, was the Indigenous guide for the party, which included Strzelecki; the New South Wales men James MacArthur and James Riley; and their servants, Irish convict James Nolan and African convict John Rent.

The party crossed Latrobe River and travelled along Traralgon Creek to a heavily forested area, where the party was forced to abandon their horses and equipment. The location was commemorated by monument at Traralgon Creek, Koornalla, erected in 1927. The team's rations were reduced to a slice of bacon and a biscuit per day, but Tarra hunted for animals to end their hunger. They traversed the headwaters of Morwell River, before making a difficult journey across the heavily forested mountain range. They reached Anderson's run in Western Port in May 1840, then walked to Melbourne.

To honour the men, the mountain range was named the Strzelecki Ranges, part of the forest was named Tarra Valley, later merged into Tarra-Bulga National Park, and the river running from the valley to Port Albert was named Tarra River. Strzelecki named the region as Gipps' Land, later becoming Gippsland, in honour of his sponsor NSW Governor George Gipps.

In June 1840, a party consisting of Tarra, Riley, John Rutledge and Shoalhaven Indigenous man John Pigeon went on a second expedition to retrieve the lost horses and managed to retrieve one, by travelling through the mountains of West Gippsland, across a path that would roughly trace the present-day Princes Highway. A third expedition was made from Port Albert to Latrobe Valley in March 1841 that included William Brodribb, Alexander Kinghorne, Norman McLeod and Kirsopp with Tarra as their guide. In June 1841, a fourth expedition was made along the same route by William's brother Albert Brodribb, pastoralist Edward Hobson, Dr Edward Barker and four Boon wurrung men.

=== Pastoral leases ===
The area around Traralgon was first settled by Europeans in the 1840s. Due to the Latrobe Valley having relatively high rainfall, the land is very fertile, and farming was quickly established. As with much of central and western Gippsland, this was mainly dairy farming. In the Gippsland region between 1840 and 1860, the population of settlers grew from a few to 2,000 and the recorded Gunai population fell from 2,000 to a handful.

The first Europeans to take land in Traralgon were the brothers Dr Edmund Hobson and Edward Hobson who purchased a 19,000 acre pastoral lease in 1844, which they called Traralgon. In April 1844, Edward to a large mob of cattle out from their station near Arthur's Seat to Traralgon arriving two months later. Albert Brodribb and William Bennett started Hazelwood Station in 1844 and the following year James Rintoul had taken a run in Loy Yang and Thomas Gorringe had taken up a run at Maryvale.

=== Township established ===
The township was established in the early 1860s, the first Post Office opening on 1 January 1861. In 1877 the Gippsland railway line from Melbourne was completed with a railway station at Traralgon giving the town a major economic boost.

Traralgon was part of the area administered by the Rosedale Roads Board, before the Shire of Traralgon was established in 1879. In the latter part of the 19th century the Shire grew strongly.

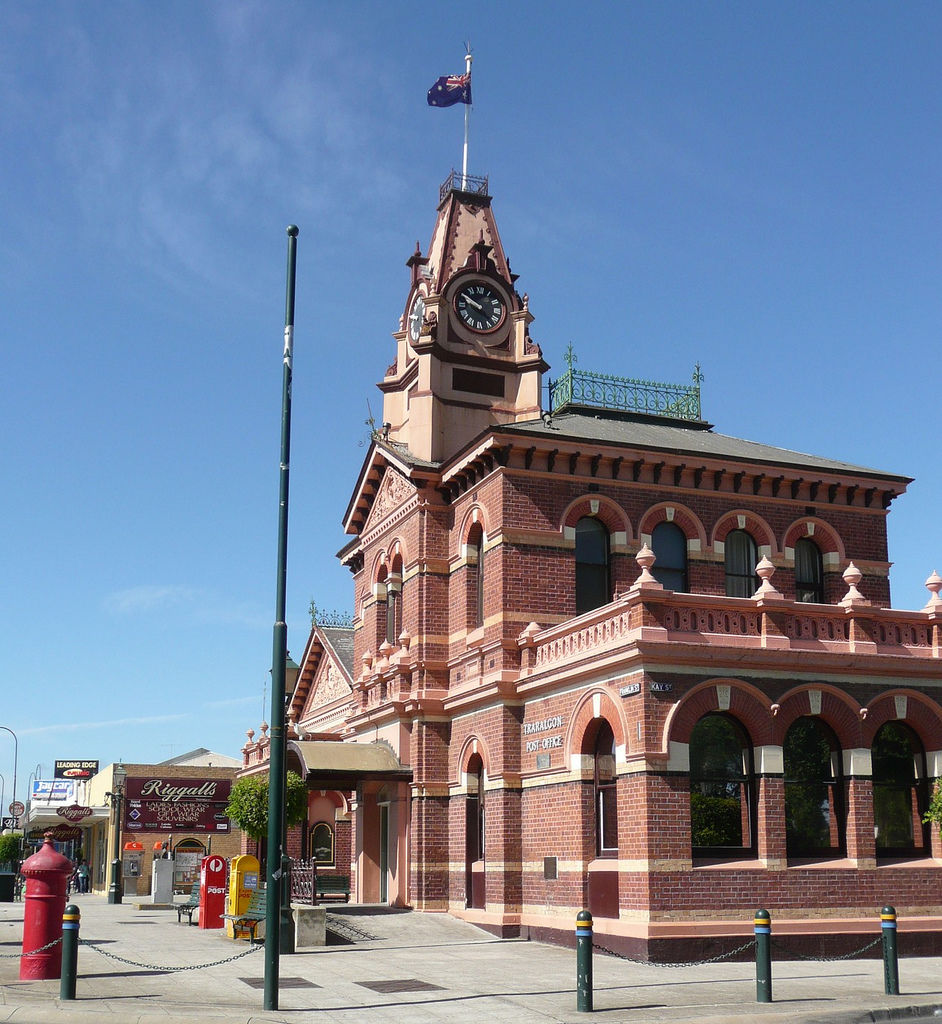
The current Post Office building, a local landmark, was completed in 1886

It was not until the 1930s however that Traralgon began to move away from a farming based economy. In 1939, Australian Paper Manufacturers established a paper mill at Maryvale, around 8 kilometres (5 mi) from Traralgon.

Queen Elizabeth II and Prince Philip, Duke of Edinburgh visited on 3 March 1954. The president of the Shire of Traralgon, Cr Clem Little met and welcomed the Queen, who was flown by the Royal Australian Air Force from Sale. She returned to Melbourne by train.

In 1961, Traralgon formed its own borough, the Borough of Traralgon following a decade of lobbying to separate the urban areas of Traralgon from the Shire. Traralgon was proclaimed a city in 1964.

The old town hall and mechanics institute were demolished in 1973.

Further development resulted from the expansion of the power generation industry following World War II, particularly through the now defunct State Electricity Commission of Victoria. This included large expansions at Yallourn and Hazelwood Power Stations and the construction of the massive Loy Yang Power Station in the 1970s and 1980s.

An Australian Securities & Investments Commission information processing centre was established in the early 1990s, at the time employing around 400 people.

The City of Traralgon and Shire of Traralgon continued a separate existence until they were amalgamated into the Shire of Latrobe in 1994.

Completion of the Loy Yang power stations, extensive voluntary departures from the electricity industry and privatisation of the Victorian electricity industry in the early 1990s had devastating effects on the economy of the Latrobe Valley. Traralgon, with a more diversified economy, suffered to a lesser extent than the neighbouring towns of Morwell and Moe both of which relied almost exclusively on the power stations for their livelihood.

Traralgon grew strongly in the mid-2000s, with a figure of 2.7% making it the largest and fastest growing city in the Latrobe Valley.

=== Heritage listings ===
Traralgon contains a number of heritage-listed sites, including:

- 161–165 Franklin Street: Traralgon Post Office and Court House
- Queens Parade: Traralgon Engine Shed and Turntable
- Victory Park, Mill Street: Azarole Hawthorn Tree

== Geography ==
Traralgon is situated on expansive flat land in the Traralgon Creek valley catchment between the Great Dividing Range in the north and the Strzelecki Ranges in the south. The Traralgon Creek runs through the city's centre and its green belt separates its eastern and western suburban areas. The urban area is hemmed to the south east by the Loy Yang Open Cut.

=== Urban structure ===
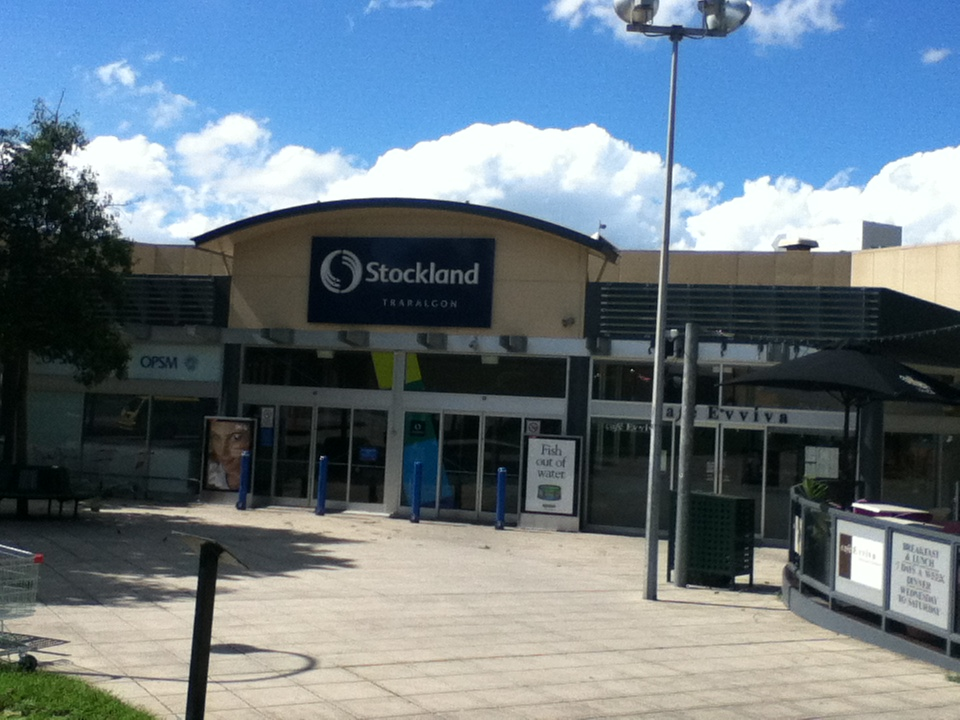
Stockland Traralgon in the CBD

Traralgon is part of the Latrobe Valley tri-city urban area, a small area of industry and agricultural land separates it from neighbouring Morwell. Traralgon together with adjacent Morwell forms an urban area with an estimated population of 41,984 as at June 2018. In the five years prior, the urban area had experienced a modest average annual growth in population of 0.5%. The Traralgon portion the combined Morwell area had a population of 27,958, also at June 2018. Greater Traralgon includes localities such as Traralgon, the suburb of Traralgon East and the relatively sparsely populated satellite localities of Hazelwood and Traralgon South to the south, and Tyers and Glengarry to the north.

The Traralgon central business district is centred around Seymour and Franklin Streets. An indoor shopping mall called Traralgon Centre Plaza was opened in 1985. Commercial and light industry sprawl along most of the eastern stretch of the Princes Highway. Notable heritage buildings include the Post Office and Courthouse erected in 1886 and Ryans Hotel erected in 1914, both in Franklin Street.

=== Climate ===
Traralgon experiences an oceanic climate (Köppen climate classification Cfb). Nights in Traralgon are about 2 °C colder than in Melbourne

Climate data for Morwell (Latrobe Valley Airport, 1984–2022); 56 m AMSL; 38.21° S, 146.47° E
Month	Jan	Feb	Mar	Apr	May	Jun	Jul	Aug	Sep	Oct	Nov	Dec	Year
Record high °C (°F)	45.4 (113.7)	46.3 (115.3)	40.4 (104.7)	35.0 (95.0)	26.7 (80.1)	23.5 (74.3)	21.8 (71.2)	26.8 (80.2)	31.0 (87.8)	35.1 (95.2)	38.6 (101.5)	42.2 (108.0)	46.3 (115.3)
Mean daily maximum °C (°F)	26.8 (80.2)	26.6 (79.9)	24.5 (76.1)	20.6 (69.1)	16.9 (62.4)	14.2 (57.6)	13.7 (56.7)	14.8 (58.6)	17.0 (62.6)	19.6 (67.3)	22.1 (71.8)	24.5 (76.1)	20.1 (68.2)
Mean daily minimum °C (°F)	13.0 (55.4)	12.9 (55.2)	11.4 (52.5)	8.8 (47.8)	6.4 (43.5)	4.3 (39.7)	3.7 (38.7)	4.4 (39.9)	5.9 (42.6)	7.5 (45.5)	9.6 (49.3)	11.3 (52.3)	8.3 (46.9)
Record low °C (°F)	1.8 (35.2)	1.9 (35.4)	1.9 (35.4)	−0.5 (31.1)	−2.8 (27.0)	−3.6 (25.5)	−4.8 (23.4)	−3.4 (25.9)	−2.6 (27.3)	−2.3 (27.9)	0.6 (33.1)	1.7 (35.1)	−4.8 (23.4)
Average precipitation mm (inches)	49.5 (1.95)	42.1 (1.66)	47.6 (1.87)	56.7 (2.23)	54.5 (2.15)	64.6 (2.54)	63.0 (2.48)	67.5 (2.66)	74.5 (2.93)	71.2 (2.80)	75.7 (2.98)	65.2 (2.57)	740.9 (29.17)
Average precipitation days (≥ 0.2 mm)	9.4	8.7	10.9	13.1	15.7	18.3	19.1	19.1	17.0	15.0	13.4	12.0	171.7

From 9 June 2021 Traralgon was one of the hardest-hit towns with 200 homes evacuated when an east coast low weather system caused widespread flash flooding across Gippsland.

== Economy ==
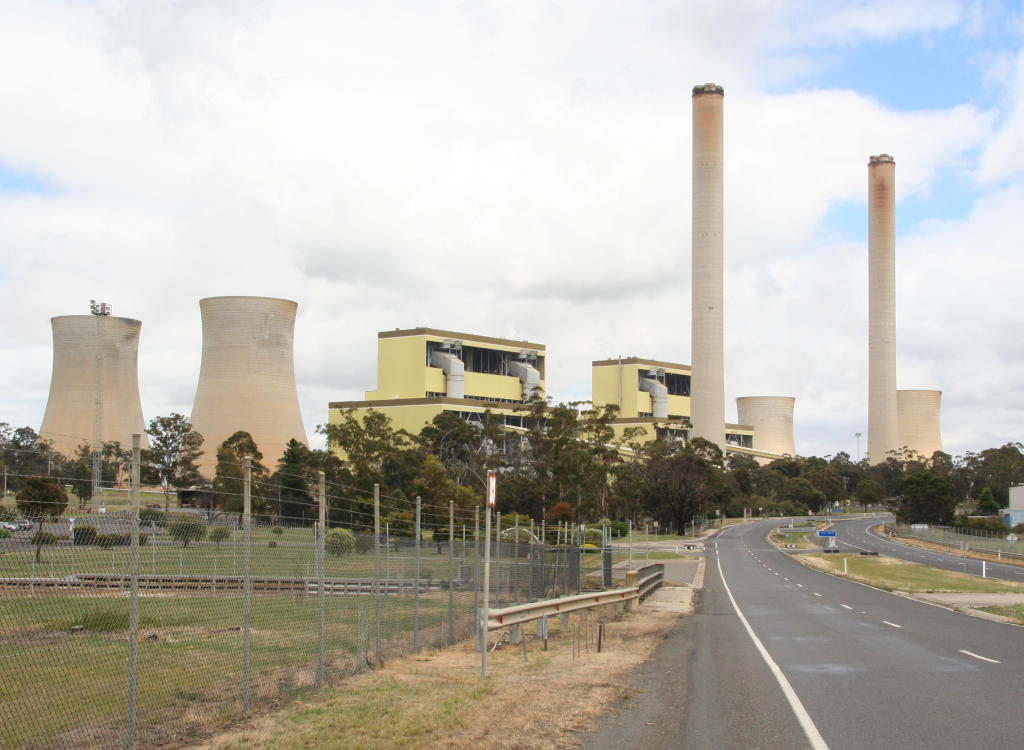
Loy Yang Power Station

The economy is primarily driven by the primary sector, natural resources and the secondary sector including coal mining, processing and fossil-fuel power generation for the National Electricity Market. Along with electricity production, Traralgon benefits from the mining for oil and natural gas in the nearby Bass Strait fields.

A significant forestry industry operates including logging of both plantation and natural forest timber, The largest paper mill in Australia is located nearby in Maryvale and provides local employment for over 2,000 people.

The local agriculture industry is involved in the production of wool and dairy products, as well as vegetable growing.

The tertiary sector of the economy is also important for employment with major government administration offices for the Australian Securities & Investments Commission, Department of Health & Human Services, Department of Environment, Land, Water & Planning and Environment Protection Authority.

== Geothermal energy ==
The Gippsland Regional Aquatic Centre in Traralgon is the first public aquatic facility in Victoria to incorporate a deep-bore geothermal heating system. The system taps in to the aquifer below ground in Traralgon at a depth of more than 600 metres where the ground water is about 65 degrees Celsius.

== Education ==
Traralgon features a number of primary and secondary schools, including state, catholic and independent schools.

The local primary schools include Grey Street Primary School (formerly Traralgon Primary School), Kosciuszko Street Primary School, Liddiard Road Primary School, Stockdale Road Primary School, St Michaels Primary School, St Gabriels Primary School, Chairo Christian School (formerly Flinders Christian Community College]) and St Pauls Anglican Grammar School. St Paul's Anglican Grammar School and Chairo Christian School are also secondary schools. In addition Traralgon has the Latrobe Special Developmental School catering for students from 4.5 to 18 years of age with an intellectual and physical disability.

The local government secondary school, Traralgon College, has two campuses, the junior campus (years 7 & 8) located on Liddiard Rd in Traralgon's east, with the senior campus (years 9–12) on Grey St in Traralgon's west. There is also a Catholic secondary school, Lavalla Catholic College. Lavalla has two campuses in Traralgon's West end, and a third campus in Newborough. The junior campus, St Paul's, neighbours Traralgon College's senior campus on Grey St. The senior campus, Kildare, is located in Kosciuszko St. Chairo Christian School on Liddiard Rd is a P– 8 school.

A number of Traralgon families also send their children to the three independent Anglican grammar schools in the region, two of which are about 40 minutes drive from Traralgon: St. Paul's Anglican Grammar School, which has a campus in Traralgon as well as Warragul, or Gippsland Grammar School in Sale.

TAFE and University education is also available within the region. Traralgon is a 15-minute drive from Federation University Australia's Gippsland Campus, located in the neighbouring town of Churchill. Traralgon is also home to one of a number of campuses for the region's TAFE provider, TAFE Gippsland.

== Sport ==
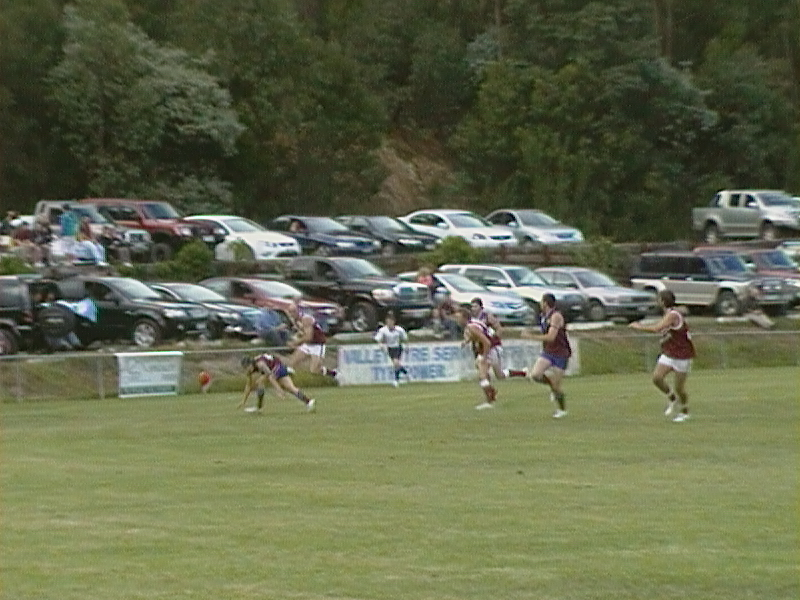
Australian rules football GFL match in 2010 between Traralgon and Moe

Australian rules football is popular. There are two senior clubs, the Traralgon Maroons (which briefly competed in the Victorian Football League between 1996 and 1997) currently competing in the Gippsland Football League and Traralgon-Tyers United competing in the North Gippsland Football League. There is also a junior league, Traralgon and District Junior Football League, with most games played from the West End Sporting Complex.

Cricket is also popular, with a local league, the Traralgon and District Cricket Association (TDCA) operating.

Soccer is represented by two clubs – Traralgon City and Traralgon Olympians – who both play in the Latrobe Valley Soccer League. The home grounds are Harold Preston Reserve and Harold Preston Park respectively.

There is a local basketball league, the Traralgon Basketball Association with a stadium at the Traralgon Sports Complex. The Traralgon Sports Stadium played host to preliminary round games of the Basketball competition during the 2006 Commonwealth Games which were held in Melbourne.

The local baseball team is the Traralgon Redsox.

Traralgon has a horse racing club, the Latrobe Valley Racing Club, which schedules two race meetings a year including the Cup meeting in December.

The Traralgon Greyhound Racing Club holds regular greyhound racing meetings at Glenview Park. The first meeting was held on 28 June 1973.

Golfers play at the course of the Traralgon Golf Club on the Princes Highway.

The Traralgon Harriers are a running club that runs 5 or 6 km races every Thursday night and also organise Victoria's oldest marathon, the Traralgon Marathon, held every June.

The Latrobe Valley Cycling club hold road and track racing events on most weeks throughout the year.

Traralgon Pistol Club and Traralgon small bore rifle Club also located in the town.

=== Entertainment ===
The entertainment precinct which spans Kay, Grey and Franklin Streets attracts people from surrounding towns to several nightclubs, bars and restaurants located there.

== Local media ==
=== Newspapers ===
The weekly Latrobe Valley Express newspaper is delivered to all homes on Wednesday nights, in Traralgon, Morwell and Moe. The Traralgon Record newspaper has been digitised from 1886 to 1932 as part of the Australian Newspapers Digitisation Program.

Melbourne Newspapers such as The Weekly Times, The Age and the Herald Sun and national newspapers like The Australian, The Saturday Paper, and the Australian Financial Review are also available.

=== Television ===
The area was the first in Australia to receive its own regional television station, GLV-10 Gippsland (now Network 10), when it launched on 9 December 1961.

Programs from the three main commercial television networks (Seven, Nine and 10) are all re-broadcast into Latrobe Valley by their regional stations – Seven (AMV), WIN (VTV) and Network 10 (GLV). All broadcast from the Latrobe Valley transmitter at Mount Tassie. All the commercial stations are based in Traralgon and have local commercials placed on their broadcasts.

Local news is available on all three commercial networks:

- WIN broadcasts a half-hour WIN News bulletin each weeknight at 5:30pm, produced from studios in Wollongong.
- Network 10 and Seven broadcast short local news and weather updates throughout the day, produced and broadcast from Seven's Canberra studios and 10's Tasmanian studios.

Nine previously produced a local news bulletin branded Nine News Gippsland and later Nine News Local for a brief period between 2017 and 2021 that aired on the Southern Cross Austereo primary channel when it was previously affiliated with Nine.

Both national public broadcasters, ABC (ABC TV) and SBS (SBS TV) are broadcast into the Latrobe Valley as well, via Mount Tassie, as well as from the Dandenong Ranges transmitters located east of Melbourne.

Additional digital multi-channels broadcast by all the networks in addition to the ones listed above are available on the digital service called Freeview to viewers in Traralgon and the Gippsland/Latrobe Valley region. These channels include HD simulcasts of the primary channel (available on channels 20, 30, 50, 60 and 80). As well as ABC Family, ABC Entertains, ABC News, SBS2, SBS World Movies, 10 Drama, 10 Comedy, Nickelodeon, 7two, 7mate, 7flix, 7Bravo, 9Gem, 9Go!, 9Life and News24 Regional.

Television transmissions from Mount Dandenong for the Melbourne market (Seven, Nine and Ten) can also be received in digital in Traralgon with a suitable roof-top antenna.

Subscription television service Foxtel (previously Austar until 2014) is available via satellite.

=== Radio ===
There are two radio stations with studios located in Traralgon – TRFM (99.5 MHz) and Gold 1242, both owned by Ace Radio. The FM station is broadcast along with the television channels from Mount Tassie while Gold 1242 is broadcast from an AM transmitter near Sale. Warragul radio stations Triple M (97.9 MHz) and 3GG (531 kHz) also service this region.

Most ABC stations are rebroadcast locally and available in Traralgon, along with 774 ABC Melbourne which is able to be received directly from Melbourne and the local ABC Gippsland station (100.7 MHz). Some Melbourne stations both on the AM band and the FM band can be heard in the more elevated parts of Traralgon, however DAB+ is not available without a vertically polarized roof-top antenna.

Community radio stations Gippsland FM (104.7 MHz) based in Morwell and Life FM (103.9 MHz) based in Sale are also broadcast into the Latrobe Valley and can be heard in Traralgon.

== Transport ==
Road transport and the motor vehicle is the main form of transport. The Princes Highway runs through the city and close to the CBD which received heavy regional traffic (although a Traralgon Bypass road is undergoing planning). The Hyland Highway also originates at Traralgon.

Rail transport includes both passenger rail and freight rail. The city's only station is Traralgon railway station which is on the Gippsland railway line served by V/Line services from Melbourne to Bairnsdale. Victoria's electronic ticketing system, Myki, was implemented on rail services between Traralgon and Melbourne on 8 July 2013.

Latrobe Valley Buslines provides local services around Traralgon and other cities in the Latrobe Valley.

Latrobe Valley Airport is located close to Traralgon in nearby Morwell and provides general aviation.

Traralgon has a minimal bicycle infrastructure, with few segregated cycle facilities. An exception is the 63-kilometre-long Gippsland Plains Rail Trail which connects Traralgon to Stratford via Cowwarr, Heyfield, Tinamba and Maffra. A new cycling and walking path was opened in 2020 between Traralgon and Morwell and with a connection to the Latrobe Regional Hospital (LRH).

== Notable people ==
Sport

- Edgar Dunbar, Australian Rules footballer
- Harold Dunbar, Australian Rules footballer
- Hugh Dunbar, Australian Rules footballer
- Nicole Faltum, cricketer
- Kristin Godridge, tennis player
- Fran Hammond, basketballer
- Russell Madden, Australian rules footballer
- Tim Membrey, Australian Rules footballer
- Jenna O'Hea, basketballer
- Len Petch, Australian Rules footballer
- Joe Price, Australian Rules footballer
- Bernie Quinlan, Australian Rules footballer
- Ted Riches, Australian Rules footballer
- Graham Rowley, cyclist
- Jaz Shelley, basketballer
- Peter Siddle, cricketer
- Ruby Storm, Paralympic swimmer
- Michael Voss, Australian Rules footballer
- Jack White, basketballer

Other

- Gord Bamford, Australian-Canadian country music singer
- Shannon Barnett, musician
- Paul Edbrooke, politician
- Tim Hein, minister, university theology lecturer, podcaster, guitarist
- Macfarlane Burnet, scientist, recipient of 1960 Nobel Prize in medicine
- Kristy McBain, politician
- Derek Muller, science communicator
- Danny O'Brien, politician
- John Pesutto, politician
- Irwin Thomas, musician, formerly known as Jack Jones, of "Southern Sons"
- Bill Waters, headquarters, commissioner for Rovers for 35 years, namesake of W.F Waters Award
- Eva West, accountant
- Thomas Headon, musician
