= Gippsland Independent Schools =

Gippsland Independent Schools (GIS) is an association of schools in Gippsland, Victoria, Australia. The association organises many inter-school extracurricular competitions. These include swimming, diving, athletics, summer sports (cricket, tennis, softball and basketball), winter sports (football, soccer, hockey and netball), and cultural festivals, including drama, chess, dance and debating. Students from year 7 and up can participate in most of these events.

== Schools ==
- Chairo Christian School, Drouin
- Chairo Christian School, Leongatha
- Chairo Christian School, Traralgon
- Mary MacKillop Catholic Regional College, Leongatha
- Lavalla Catholic College, Traralgon
