= Bruce Reid Sr. =

Australian rules footballer

Personal information
- Full name: Bruce Reid
- Born: 27 April 1929; Bendigo, Victoria
- Died: 24 August 1955 (aged 26); Parkville, Victoria
- Original team: Romsey
- Height: 175 cm (5 ft 9 in)
- Weight: 77 kg (170 lb)

Playing career^{1}
Years	Club	Games (Goals)
1949–1951	Footscray	28 (15)
- ^{1} Playing statistics correct to the end of 1951.

Bruce Reid Sr. (27 April 1929 – 24 August 1955) was an Australian rules footballer who played with Footscray in the Victorian Football League (VFL).

Reid, a Romsey recruit, played 17 of a possible 19 games in the 1949 VFL season. He added another eight games the following year but appeared just three times in 1951, his final season.

He was the father of Bruce Reid Jr. and John Reid, who both would also play for Footscray. He died in August 1955, 4 months before Bruce junior was born.
