= Ben Reid =

Former Australian rules footballer

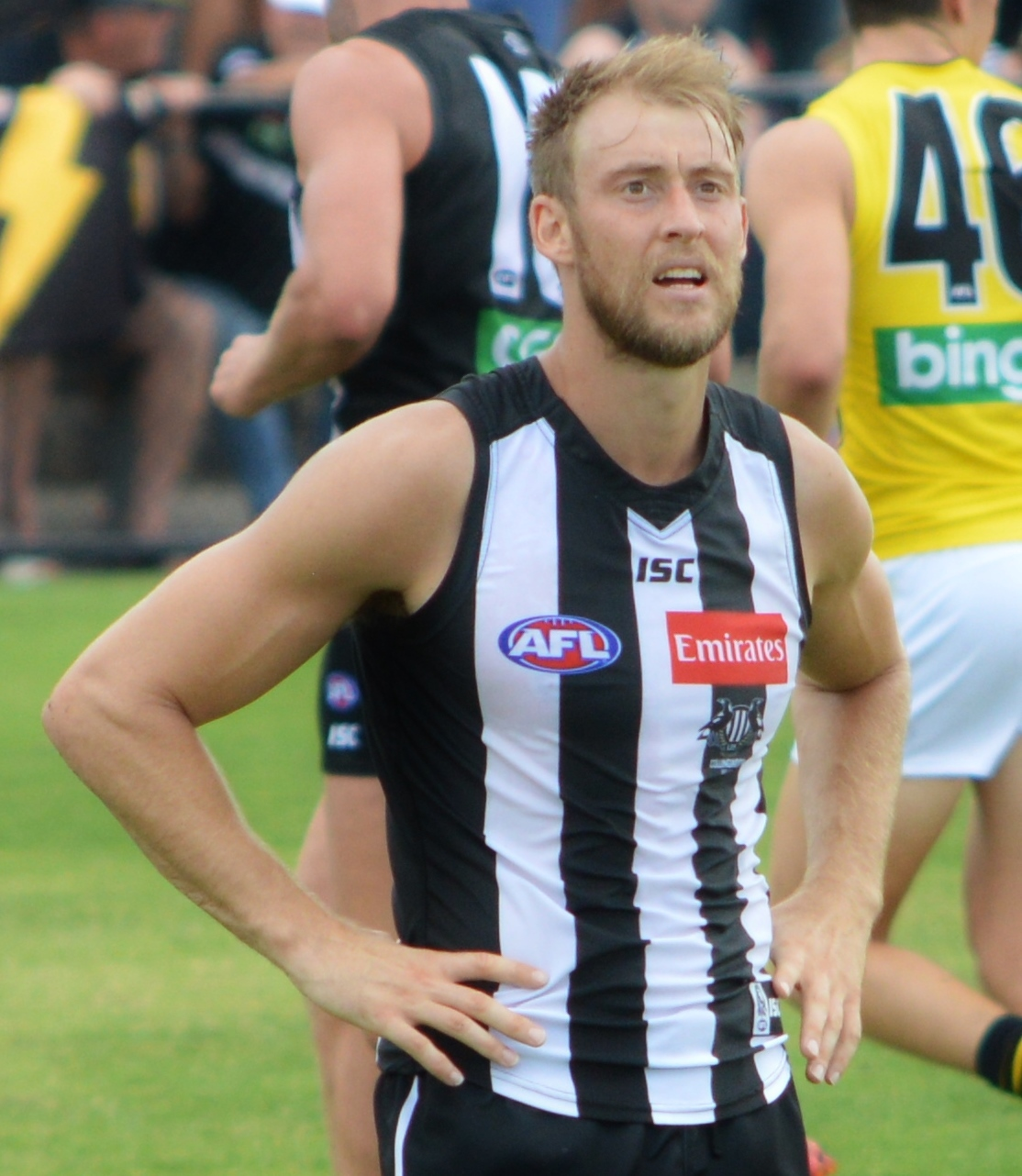
- Reid during a pre-season match in March 2017

Personal information
- Full name: Ben Reid
- Born: 29 April 1989 (age 37)
- Original teams: Wangaratta Rovers, Murray Bushrangers (TAC Cup)
- Draft: 8th overall, 2006 National Draft, Collingwood
- Height: 195 cm (6 ft 5 in)
- Weight: 102 kg (225 lb)
- Position: Defender / Forward

Playing career
Years	Club	Games (Goals)
2007–2020	Collingwood	152 (73)

Career highlights
- Collingwood premiership player 2010; 2010 AFL Rising Star nominee; 2011 All-Australian team

Ben Reid (born 29 April 1989) is a former Australian rules footballer who played for Collingwood in the Australian Football League (AFL).

== Personal life ==
Reid grew up in Wangaratta Victoria, attending Galen Catholic College. He is the son of former Footscray and Carlton player, Bruce Reid. His younger brother Sam Reid also plays AFL football for the Sydney Swans.

== AFL career ==
Reid was taken with Collingwood's first pick in the 2006 AFL draft, pick number eight, and was handed the number 20 guernsey which was vacated by Chris Tarrant, after he was traded to the Fremantle Dockers. Reid made his Collingwood debut in Round 13, 2007 against Hawthorn, aged 18 years and 2 months. He was the youngest player in the AFL at the time. Originally recruited as a forward, he is now recognised as one of the best key defenders in the game. He previously played for the Murray Bushrangers, Wangaratta Rovers and Bright Junior Football Club.

=== 2010 ===
Prior to 2010 Reid had only played a cumulated total of 8 games from 2007 to 2009. 2010 would become his breakout year when he went on to play 21 games out of a possible 26. In round 12 he was nominated for the AFL Rising Star award, and went on to finish 10th overall. Reid played in both Grand Finals opposite St Kilda's Justin Koschitzke. In the Grand Final replay Reid suffered a leg injury, but wanted to play on and finish the game. It was later discovered that he had continued to play with a fractured fibula.

=== 2011 ===
Reid continued his good form and was rewarded with selection in the 2011 All-Australian team in the centre half-back position and a seventh placing in the Copeland Trophy, Collingwood's best and fairest award. However his season finished on a poor note, being well beaten by Tom Hawkins in the 2011 AFL Grand Final. He had injured his groin in the lead up to the Qualifying Final, three weeks earlier.

=== Retirement ===
Reid announced his retirement from AFL football in late 2020 after only managing two games for the season due to injury.

== Statistics ==
Statistics are correct to the end of the 2020 season

Legend
G	Goals	K	Kicks	D	Disposals	T	Tackles
B	Behinds	H	Handballs	M	Marks

Season	Team	No.	Games	Totals							Averages (per game)						
Season	Team	No.	Games	G	B	K	H	D	M	T	G	B	K	H	D	M	T
2007	Collingwood	20	3	2	4	20	3	23	15	2	0.7	1.3	6.7	1.0	7.7	5.0	0.7
2008	Collingwood	20	3	0	2	14	9	23	9	4	0.0	0.7	4.7	3.0	7.7	3.0	1.3
2009	Collingwood	20	2	1	1	10	5	15	5	4	0.5	0.5	5.0	2.5	7.5	2.5	2.0
2010	Collingwood	20	21	0	0	193	105	298	119	26	0.0	0.0	9.2	5.0	14.2	5.7	1.2
2011	Collingwood	20	24	1	0	241	129	370	161	24	0.0	0.0	10.0	5.4	15.4	6.7	1.0
2012	Collingwood	20	20	1	1	181	103	284	110	28	0.1	0.1	9.1	5.2	14.2	5.5	1.4
2013	Collingwood	20	22	25	11	201	129	330	135	34	1.1	0.5	9.1	5.9	15.0	6.1	1.5
2014	Collingwood	20	4	1	1	19	9	28	9	4	0.3	0.3	4.8	2.3	7.0	2.3	1.0
2015	Collingwood	20	5	6	2	42	28	70	24	7	1.2	0.4	8.4	5.6	14.0	4.8	1.4
2016	Collingwood	20	17	0	0	209	87	296	136	16	0	0	12.3	5.1	17.4	8.0	0.9
2017	Collingwood	20	15	14	13	155	53	208	94	18	0.9	0.9	10.3	3.5	13.9	6.3	1.2
2018	Collingwood	20	6	8	6	52	17	69	34	7	1.3	1.0	8.7	2.8	11.5	5.7	1.2
2019	Collingwood	20	8	11	7	45	32	77	27	9	1.4	0.9	5.6	4.0	9.6	3.4	1.1
2020	Collingwood	20	2	3	0	7	4	11	3	1	1.5	0.0	3.5	2.0	5.5	1.5	0.5
Career			152	73	48	1389	713	2102	881	185	0.5	0.3	9.1	4.7	13.8	5.8	1.2
