= Keith Robertson (Australian footballer) =

Australian rules footballer (1938–2020)

Personal information
- Full name: Keith Robert Robertson
- Born: 27 October 1938
- Died: 17 October 2020 (aged 81)

Playing career^{1}
Years	Club	Games (Goals)
1957–1963	North Melbourne	69 (9)
- ^{1} Playing statistics correct to the end of 1963.

Keith Robertson (27 October 1938 – 17 October 2020 ) was an Australian rules footballer who played for North Melbourne in the Victorian Football League (VFL) from 1957 to 1963.

His two sons, Rohan and Shane also played for North Melbourne, making their VFL debuts on the same day in 1985.
