= Shane Robertson (footballer, born 1962) =

Australian rules footballer (born 1962)

Personal information
- Full name: Shane Robertson
- Nickname: Robbo
- Born: 10 December 1962 (age 63); Brunswick, Melbourne
- Original team: Wangaratta Rovers

Playing career^{1}
Years	Club	Games (Goals)
1985	North Melbourne	4 (1)
- ^{1} Playing statistics correct to the end of 1985.

Shane Robertson (born 10 December 1962) is a former Australian rules footballer who played for North Melbourne in the Victorian Football League (VFL) in 1985.

Robertson was a member of Wangaratta Rovers' 1979 Ovens & Murray Football League's premiership team.

He made his VFL debut on the same day as his older brother, Rohan Robertson. His father Keith also played for North Melbourne in between 1957 and 1963. Robertson's career came to end due to him having a career ending leg injury that put him out of sport.

Son of former North Melbourne player, Keith Robertson and younger brother of Rohan Robertson.
