= Rohan Robertson =

Australian rules footballer (1961–2022)

Personal information
- Full name: Rohan Phillip Michael Robertson
- Born: 21 August 1961
- Died: 27 December 2022 (aged 61)

Playing career^{1}
Years	Club	Games (Goals)
1985–1988	North Melbourne	26 (7)
- ^{1} Playing statistics correct to the end of 1988.

Rohan Phillip Michael Robertson (21 August 1961 – 27 December 2022) was an Australian rules footballer who played for North Melbourne in the Victorian Football League (VFL) between 1985 and 1988.

He made his VFL debut on the same day as his younger brother, Shane Robertson. His father Keith also played for North Melbourne in between 1957 and 1963.
