= Bendigo =

- City
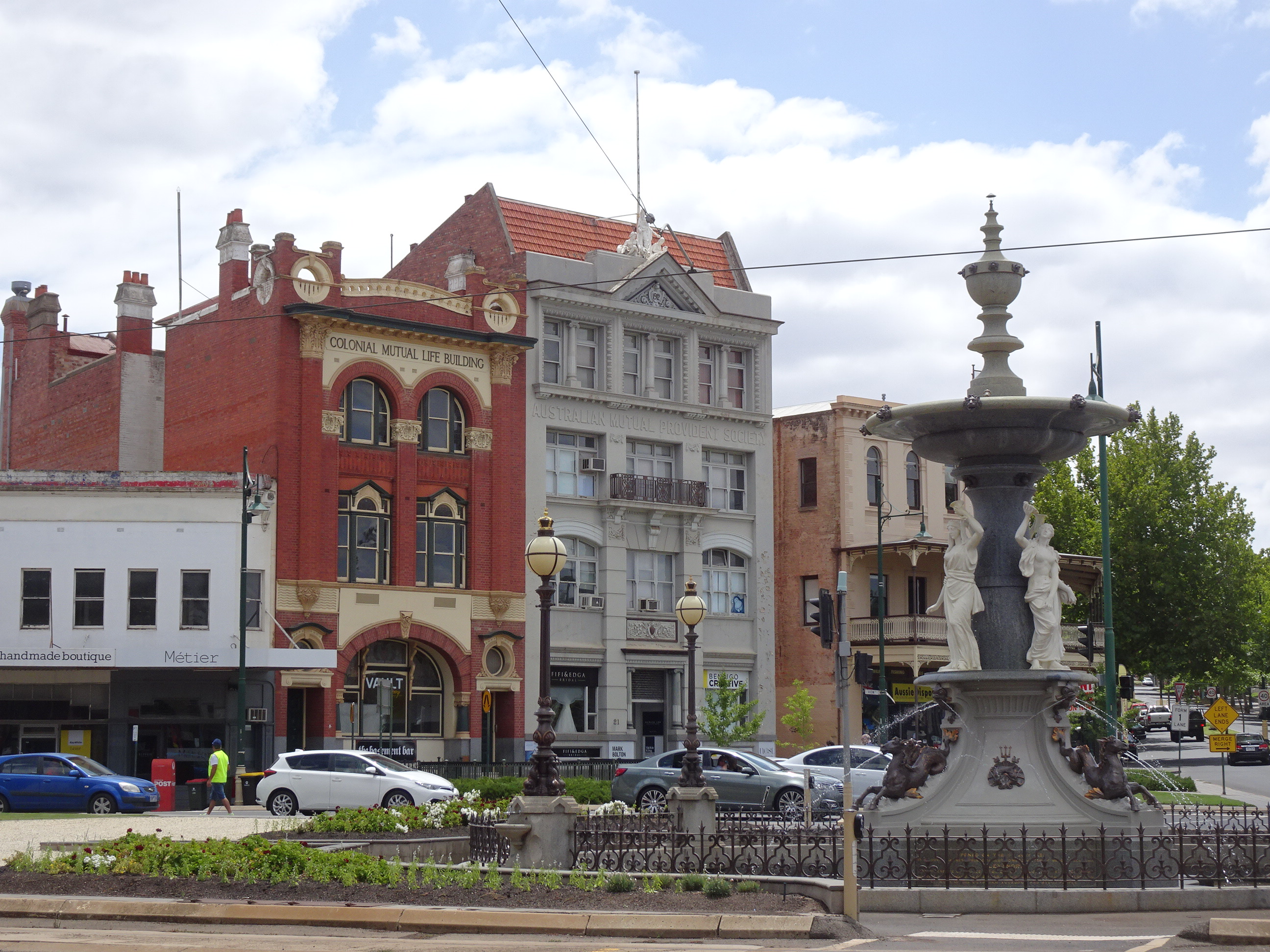
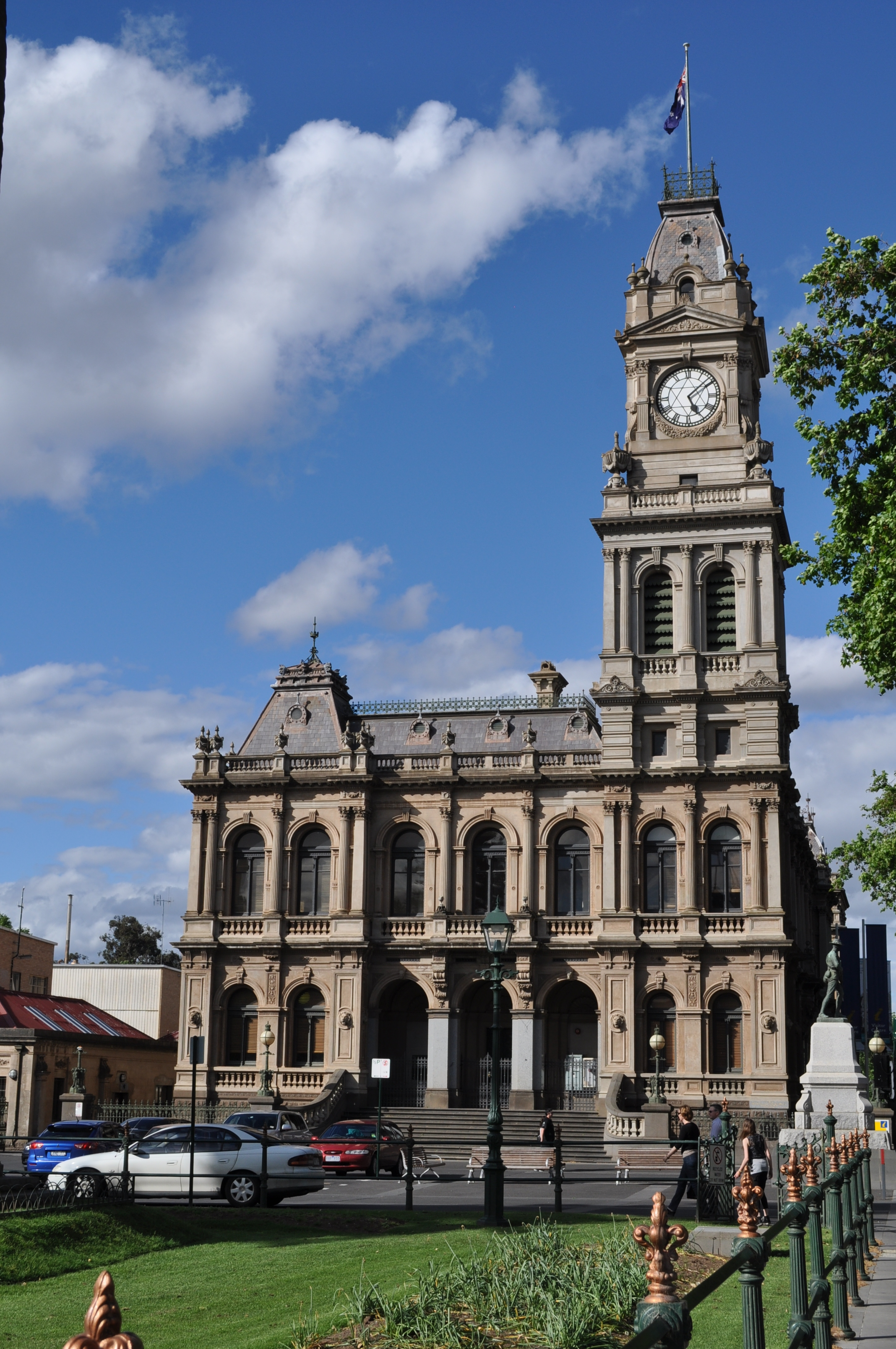
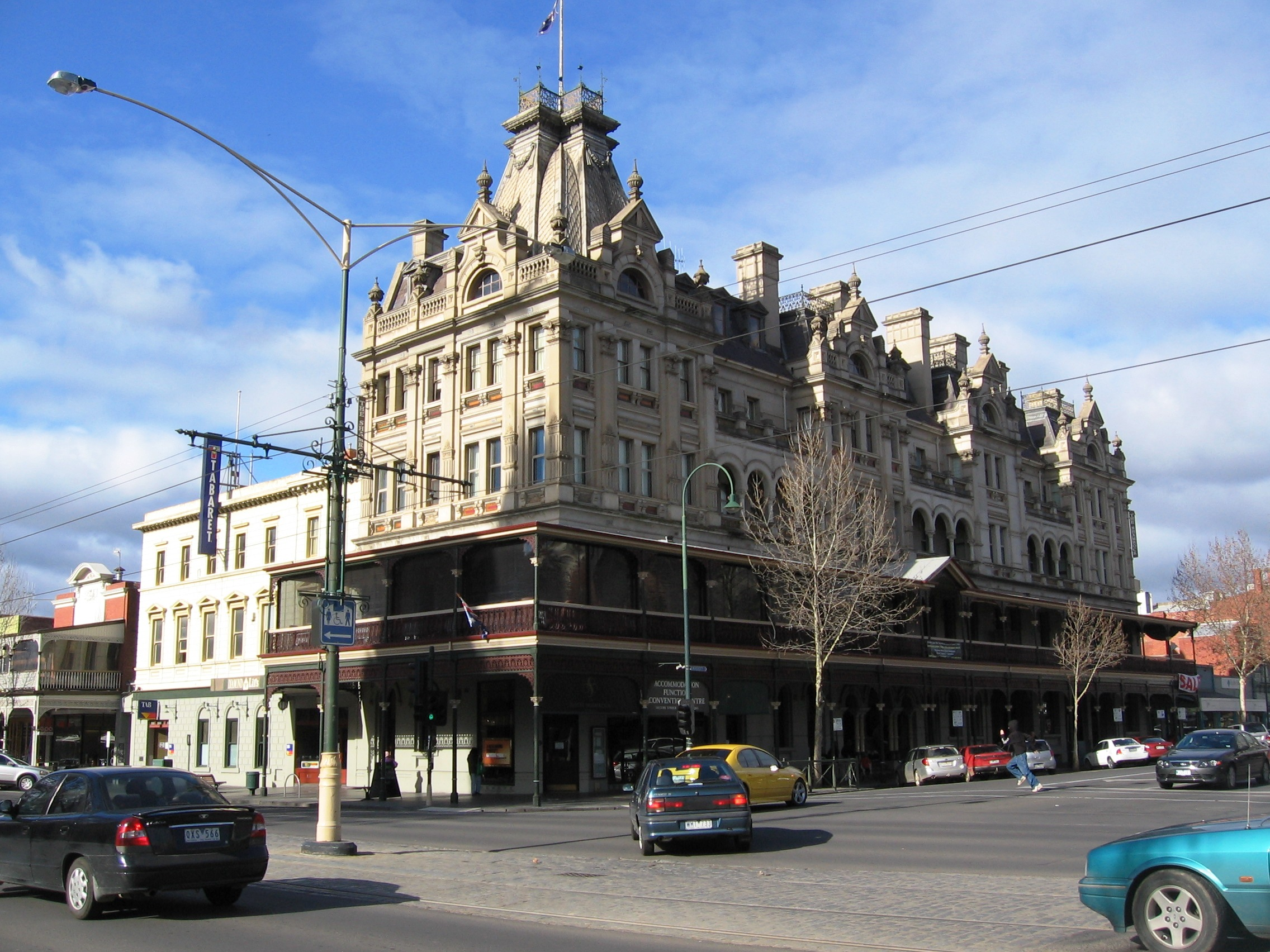
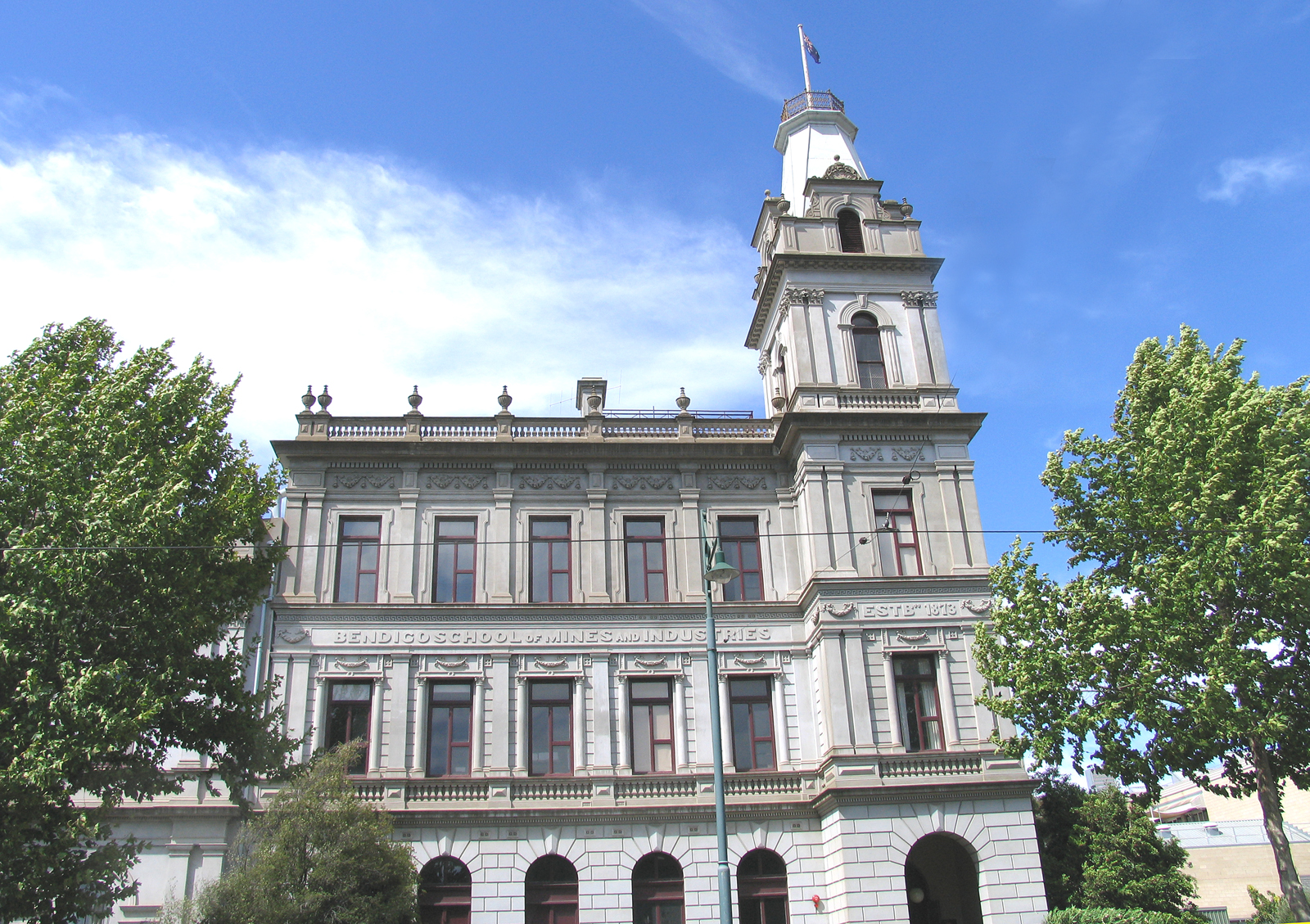
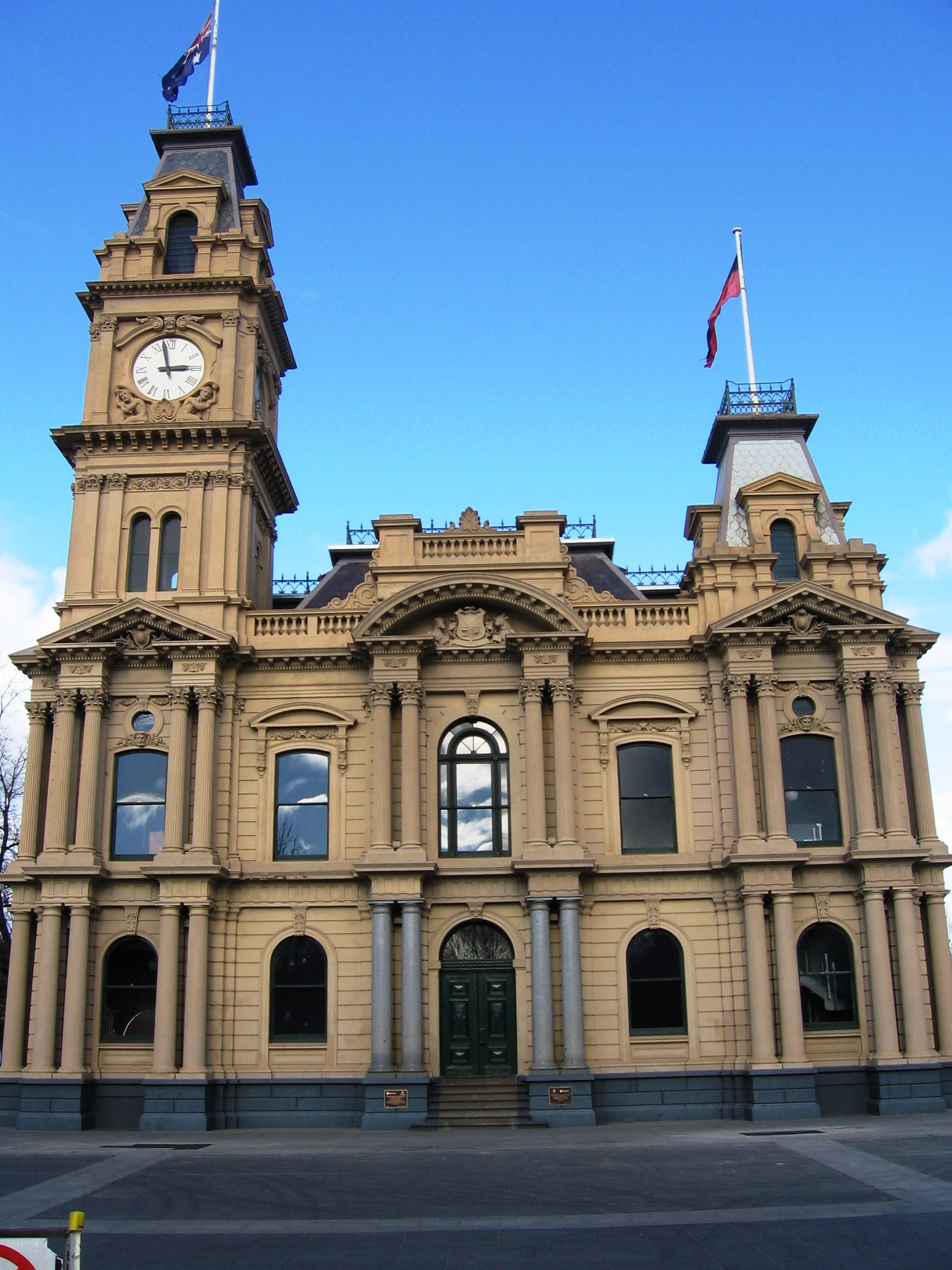
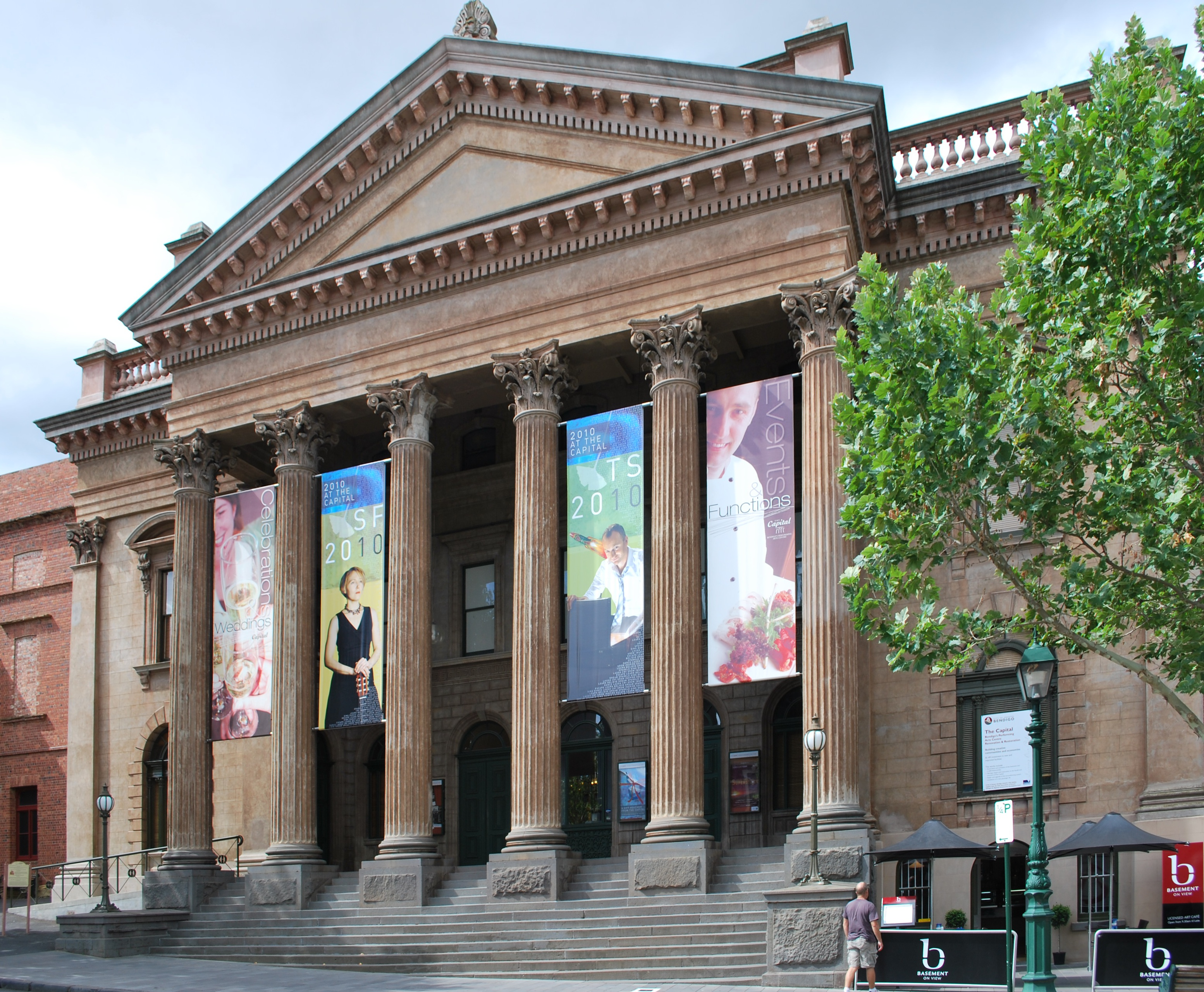
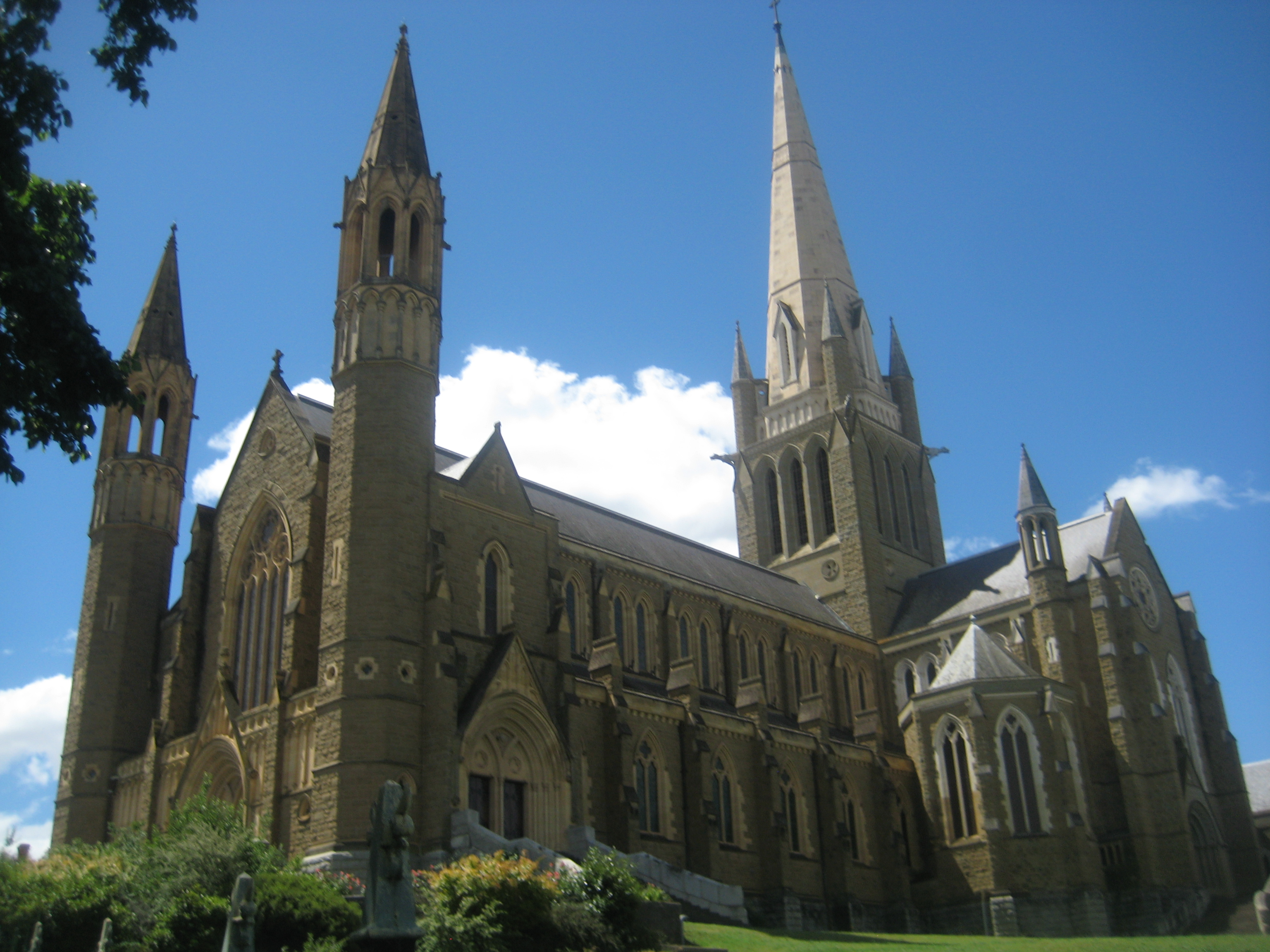
- City Centre Post Office Shamrock Hotel School of Mines Town Hall Capital Theatre Sacred Heart Cathedral

- Coordinates: 36°45′0″S 144°16′0″E
- Country: Australia
- State: Victoria
- Region: Loddon Mallee
- LGA: City of Greater Bendigo
- Location: 150 km (93 mi) NW of Melbourne; 423 km (263 mi) SE of Mildura; 98 km (61 mi) NE of Ballarat
- Established: 1851

Government
  - State electorates: Bendigo East; Bendigo West
  - Federal division: Bendigo

Area (2016 urban)
  - Total: 287.4 km^{2} (111.0 sq mi)
- Elevation: 213 m (699 ft)

Population
  - Total: 103,034 (2021) (19th)
  - Density: 358.50/km^{2} (928.52/sq mi)
- Time zone: UTC+10 (AEST)
  - Summer (DST): UTC+11 (AEST)
- Postcode: 3550
- County: Bendigo
- Mean max temp: 21.2 °C (70.2 °F)
- Mean min temp: 8.0 °C (46.4 °F)
- Annual rainfall: 510.0 mm (20.08 in)

Bendigo (/ˈbɛndɪɡoʊ/ BEN-dig-oh), formerly known as Sandhurst, is an Australian city in north-central Victoria. The city is located in the Bendigo Valley near the geographical centre of the state and approximately 150 kilometres (93 mi) north-west of Melbourne, the state capital.

As of 2022, the urban core area of Bendigo had an official population of 103,818 making it Australia's 19th-largest city by population. Bendigo is the fourth-largest inland city in Australia and the fourth-most populous city in Victoria.

Bendigo is administered by the City of Greater Bendigo. The council area encompasses roughly 3,000 square kilometres. The city is surrounded by smaller towns such as Castlemaine, Heathcote, Kyneton, Maryborough, Elmore, Rochester, Goornong and Axedale.

The traditional owners of the area are the Dja Dja Wurrung (Djaara) people. The discovery of gold on Bendigo Creek in 1851 transformed the area from a sheep station into one of colonial Australia's largest boomtowns. News of the finds intensified the Victorian gold rush, bringing an influx of migrants from around the world, particularly Europe and China. Bendigo became eastern Australia's largest 19th-century gold-mining economy, and the wealth generated during this period is reflected today in the city's Victorian architectural heritage. From 1853 until 1891, Bendigo was officially named Sandhurst.

Bendigo's boom period lasted until the early 20th century and after a temporary decline in population and employment, renewed growth occurred from the 1930s as the city consolidated as a manufacturing and regional service centre. Although gold mining continues, recent population growth has been most heavily concentrated in suburban areas. With the completion of the Calder Freeway linking Melbourne and Bendigo in 2009, and the region's proximity to Melbourne, Bendigo has become one of the fastest-growing regional centres in Victoria.

== History ==
=== Indigenous history and European settlement ===
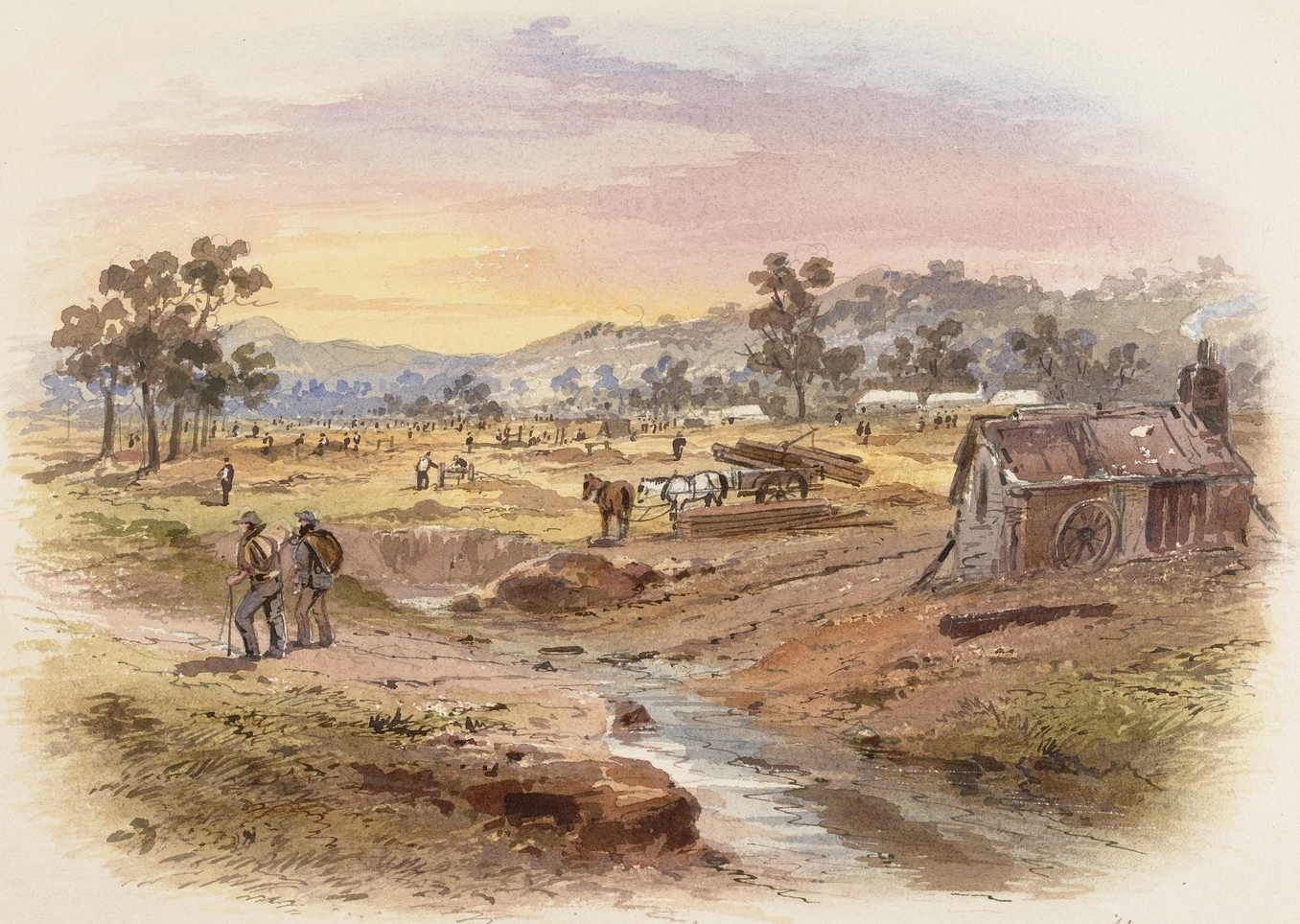
Bendigo Creek, named after a local shepherd and amateur boxer who, in turn, earned the sobriquet because his fighting style resembled that of English bare-knuckle champion William Abednego "Bendigo" Thompson

The traditional owners of the Mount Alexander area, traditionally named Leanganook, that includes Greater Bendigo, are the Dja Dja Wurrung (Djaara) people. They exploited the rich local hunting grounds from which they were displaced by the arrival by white settlers, who established the first of a number of vast sheep runs in 1837. The Dja Dja Wurrung peoples experienced two waves of settlement and dispossession: from the south from 1837 and from the north from 1845. The marked decrease in Dja Dja Wurrung population was also due to the arrival of non-indigenous animals; they use their noses to "root up" the nutritious moon-nar tuber (yam daisy); after just a year it was noticed the plant was becoming scarce.

Squatters in the area included: Donald Campbell at Bullock Creek in Ravenswood; J. and R. Bakewell to the north of Bendigo; Heap and Grice to the north-west; Archibald McDougall to the west; Joseph Raleigh and James Robinson along the Campaspe River to the south; and Thomas, Jones and William Barnett to the east. The Ravenswood "Mount Alexander North run", occupied from c. 1840 by Donald Campbell, was acquired by brothers Stewart and Robert Gibson in 1848, with Frederick Fenton later replacing one of the Gibson brothers. After the discovery of gold in 1851, Fenton sold provisions to the miners and agisted their horses. Becoming the sole owner of the Ravenswood run in 1857, Fenton built its substantial homestead.

Gold was officially discovered on Bendigo Creek at the north-eastern boundary of the Ravenswood run, earlier known as the Mount Alexander North run, in October 1851. The creek is believed to have been named "Bendigo Creek" after a local shepherd and amateur boxer who worked at the Mount Alexander North run, nicknamed (possibly ironically) for the English bare-knuckle prizefighter William Abednego "Bendigo" Thompson. This theory of the name's origin is widely accepted, albeit historically controversial, since there are no known written records from these early shepherds. Other theories posit that the creek was named: after the English boxer "Bendigo" Thompson directly, by the overseer of the run Thomas Myers, who admired Thompson; for a specific quote referring to a bend in the creek, said by either Myers ("all bend and go" or "round a bend I go") or by "aboriginal shepherds" ("to bendy go"); originally, Bandicoot Creek, later corrupted to Bendigo; or after a Portuguese miner named Bernand "Ben" Deigo.

The area was transformed in less than a year as tens of thousands of people arrived during the great gold rush in 1852. It was also called Castleton for a period of four months.

Widespread gold mining caused environmental devastation and permanent damage in the district, decimating and displacing the Dja Dja Wurrung and destroying the infrastructure they created over generations to maximise seasonal drainage patterns; the channels and weirs they built out of timber stakes, to slow receding summer flows, were wrecked; water holes where the people gathered in smaller groups during periods of scarce rainfall and from which they transported water in skin bags when moving, were muddied, polluted and drained; the soaks they had dug between banks into sandy sediment to tap into the water table were likewise obliterated. Some of their waterholes in rock platforms of creeks that they found or enlarged, then covered with slabs to protect them from animals, may still remain, unidentified.

=== Gold mining boom ===
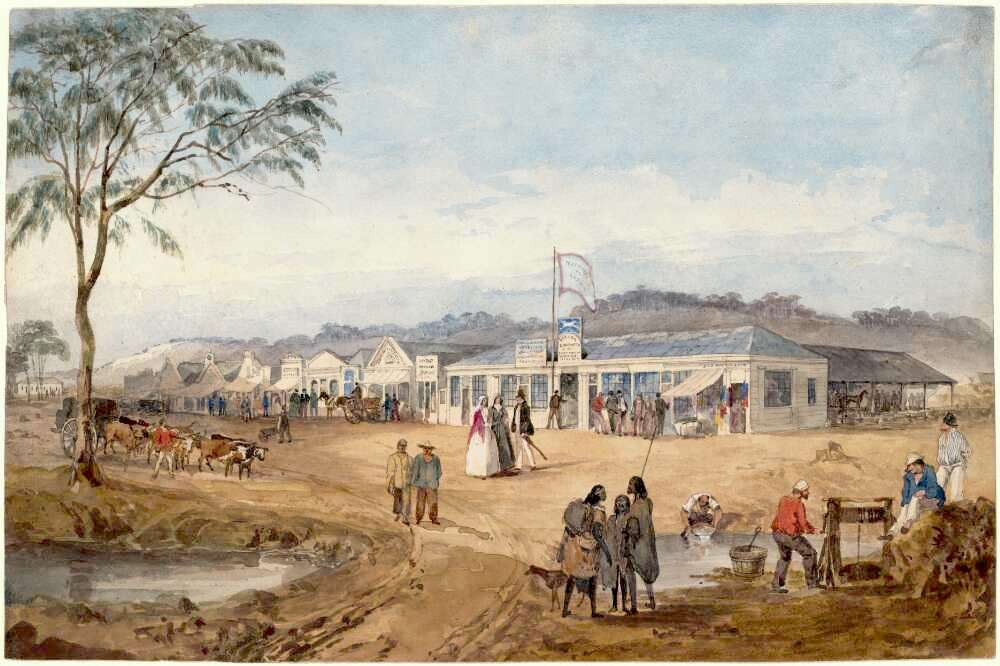
Bendigo, 1853

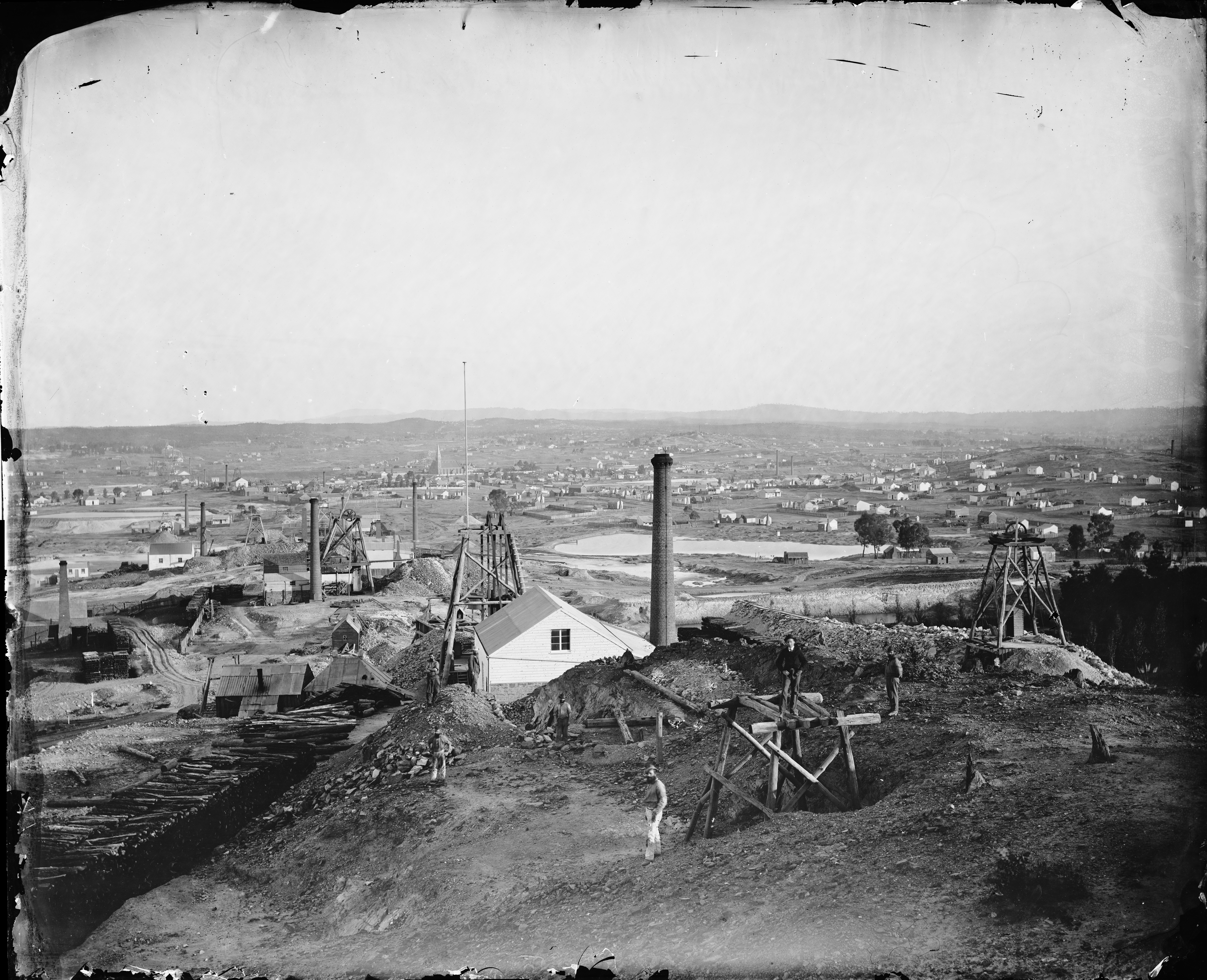
Goldfields and town of Bendigo, Victoria, Australia, c.1873

Gold was officially discovered in the area in October 1851, just after the other significant goldfields in neighbouring Castlemaine, from where a number of diggers migrated, bringing the total population to 40,000 in less than a year. A number of these diggers were Chinese and their descendants still live in the region. During 1852, under the direction of the Surveyor General of Victoria, Robert Hoddle, William Swan Urquhart was making a general survey of Mount Alexander and the surrounding ranges and the goldfields.

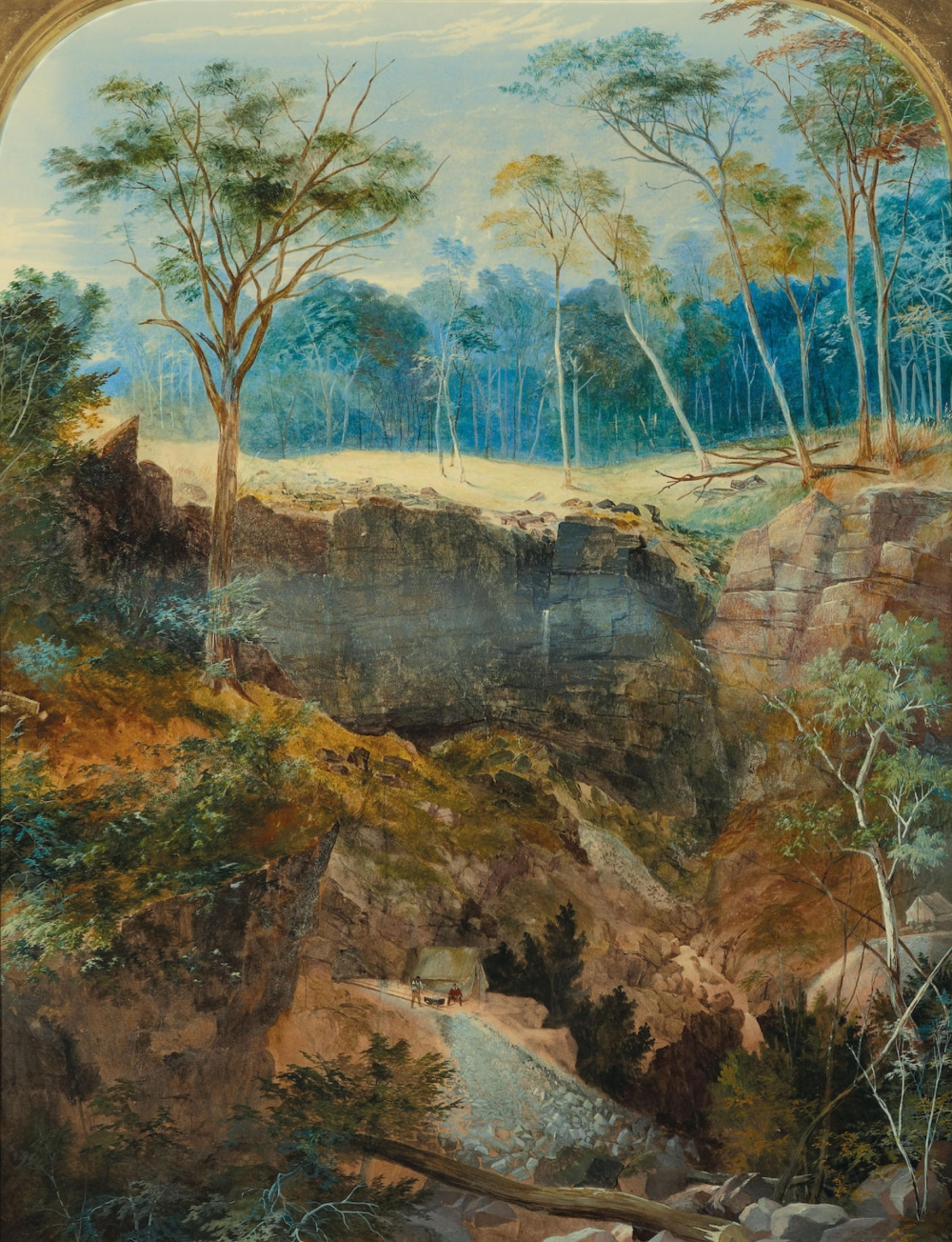
Deep Gully Mine, 1857

He fixed the site of the township as "Sandhurst". On 13 July 1852, Hoddle passed on to Urquhart the request of Lieutenant-Governor La Trobe for a plan of the Mount Alexander gold workings, and his order that he mark out a reserve at the junction of Golden Gully with Bendigo Creek, and the camp on the west side of the creek below the junction. In late August La Trobe wanted him to report urgently on the best reserves for agriculture in the district. By 26 November he had mapped Bendigo Creek and Myers Creek and his survey of the Bendigo Valley and environs marked township reserves at Bullock Creek, Ravenswood and Happy Jack where settlement was already taking place. His plan General Survey of the Bendigo Goldfields showing the proposed reserves for townships. Drawn by W. S. Urquhart, Melbourne, November 1852 recommended sites for national schools, churches, markets and other public purposes reserved from sale.

The predominant population of the Victorian goldfields throughout the gold rush era was British (being English, Irish, and Scottish), with the largest non-British population being Chinese. During the early gold rush period, about 4,000 Cornish miners went to Mount Alexander (Castlemaine), and by the late 1850s up to 17% of the mining population in Bendigo were Cornish-alone, with almost a quarter being Chinese in 1856. Such was the influence of the former that many of their mining practicises were respected and adopted. By the 1871 Victorian census, approximately 15,000 residents of the central goldfields were Cornish.

In 1853, a large protest called the Red Ribbon Rebellion was held over the cost of the licence fee for prospectors, though it passed peacefully due to good diplomacy by police and miners' leaders. From being a tent city, the boomtown grew rapidly into a major urban centre with grand public buildings. The municipality became a borough in 1863, officially known as Sandhurst until 1891, but always unofficially as Bendigo.

During this period, miner Henry Bain was noted in local accounts as a cultural patron who hosted informal gatherings of writers, artists and prospectors, later described as the "Golden Circle."

The railway had reached Bendigo by 1862, stimulating rapid growth, with flour mills, woollen mills, tanneries, quarries, foundries, eucalyptus oil production, food production industries and timber cutting. When the alluvial gold ran out, extraction of quartz-based gold continued in deep shafts using industrial systems.

Selection in the future county of Bendigo (created in 1869) commenced under the Land Act of 1865, with most settlement occurring around Sandhurst and Eaglehawk.

=== Decline and regeneration ===
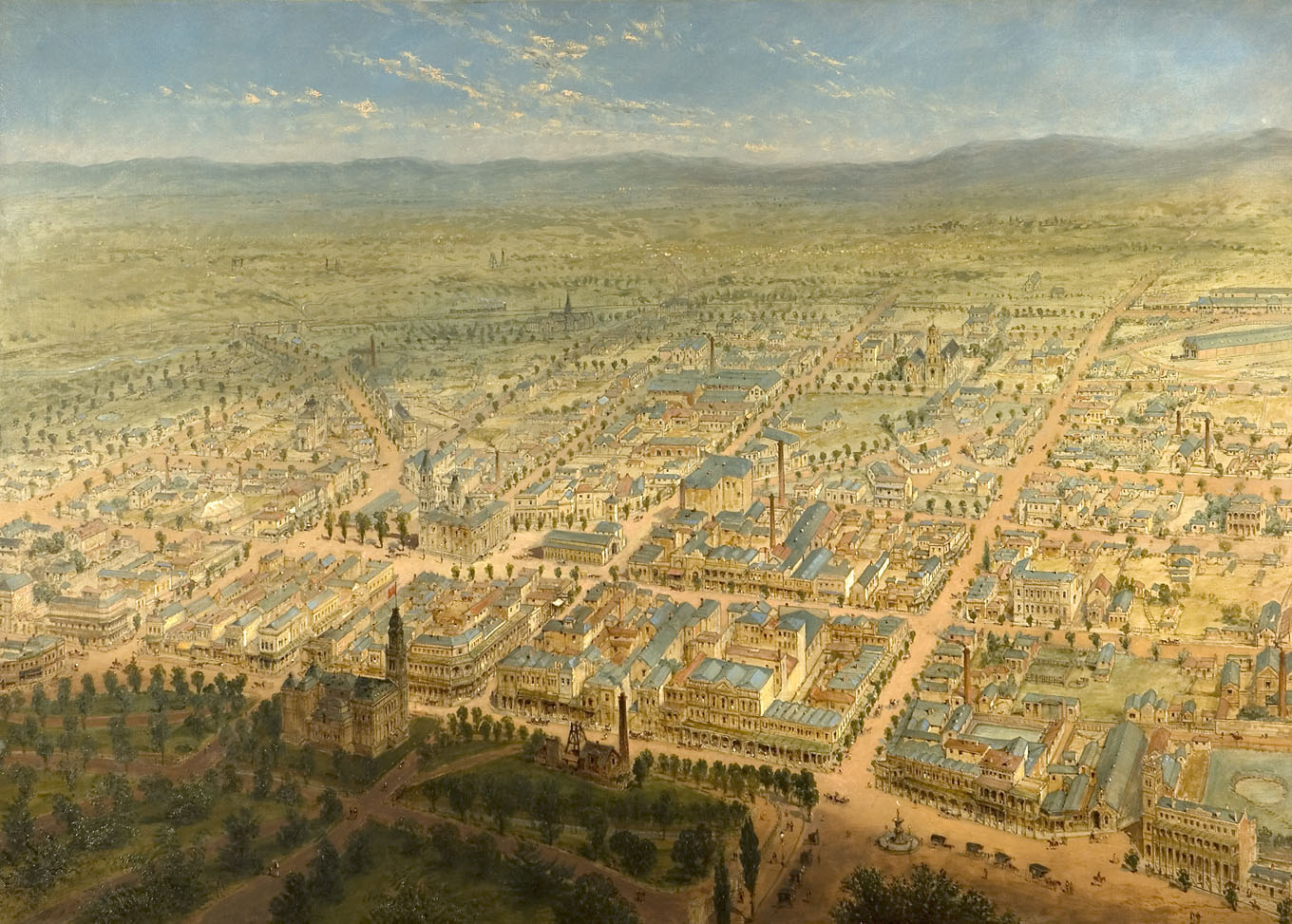
Bendigo from Camp Hill, 1886

Bendigo was declared a city in 1871. Rapid population growth brought a water shortage, partially solved with a new viaduct that harnessed the Coliban River. The architect William Charles Vahland (1828–1915) left an important mark on Bendigo during this period. He is credited with the popular cottage design known as a Vahland House. The cottage design that has vastly been customised shares a common theme of a central door, a sash window either side, a central hallway that runs the entire length of the house and verandahs ordained in iron lace, a style that was soon adopted across the state of Victoria. Vahland also designed more than 80 buildings, including the Alexandra Fountain, arguably the most prominent monument in Bendigo, with its granite dolphins, unicorns, nymphs and allegorical figures. A tram network was established by 1890, some of which is still in operation as a tourism service currently.

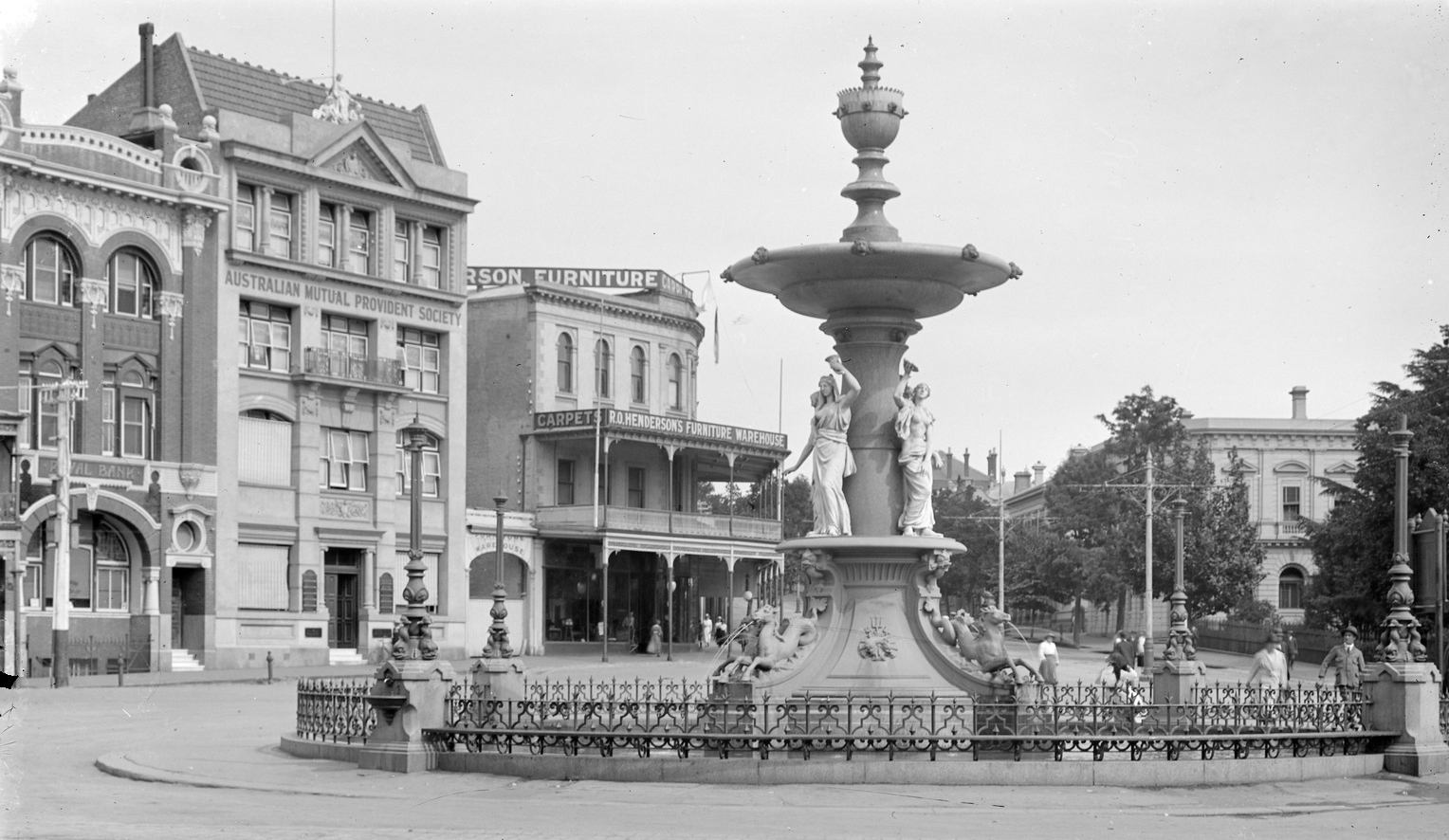
Alexandra Fountain in Charing Cross, c. 1920s, now listed along with the surrounding buildings on the Victorian Heritage Register

After a temporary drop in population, renewed growth occurred from the 1930s as the city consolidated as a manufacturing and regional service centre, though gold mining continues. Recent growth has been most heavily concentrated in areas such as Epsom, Kangaroo Flat, Strathdale and Strathfieldsaye.

On 28 March 2013, the Dja Dja Wurrung people were formally recognised as the traditional owners for part of Central Victoria, including the land on which the City of Greater Bendigo sits.

In 1994, under municipal reforms of Victoria's Kennett government, the City of Bendigo was abolished and merged with the Borough of Eaglehawk, the Huntly and Strathfieldsaye shires, and the Rural City of Marong to form the larger City of Greater Bendigo. The population of the city increased from around 78,000 in 1991 to about 100,617 in 2012. Bendigo is currently one of the fastest-growing regional centres in Victoria.

== Geography ==
The city is surrounded by components of the Greater Bendigo National Park, as well as the Bendigo Box-Ironbark Region Important Bird Area, identified as such by BirdLife International because of its importance for swift parrots and other woodland birds. A dozen species of insect-eating bats and the pollinating grey-headed flying fox inhabit the area.

=== Climate ===
Bendigo has a dry temperate climate with warm, variable summers and cool, cloudy winters. Under the Köppen-Geiger classification, it lies on a humid subtropical/cold semi-arid transitional climate zone (Cfa/BSk), due to its location on the boundary of the hot, dry inland areas to the north and the cool, damp Southern Ocean to the south. Bendigo gets 109.9 clear days annually.

The mean minimum temperature in January is 14.3 °C (57.7 °F) and the maximum 30.2 °C (86.4 °F), although temperatures above 35 °C (95.0 °F) are commonly reached. The highest temperature officially recorded was 45.4 °C (113.7 °F), during the 2009 southeastern Australia heat wave. There is also a disputed recording of 47.4 °C (117.3 °F) (on 14 January 1862). Summers are also subject to cold weather: on 2 February 2005 the daily maximum did not exceed 11.5 °C (52.7 °F).

The mean minimum temperature in July is 2.7 °C (36.9 °F) and minima below 0 °C (32 °F) are recorded on an average of 26.1 days annually. The mean maximum temperature in July is 12.7 °C (54.9 °F). Most of the city's annual rainfall of 504.6 millimetres (19.87 in) falls between June and September as cold fronts. Snowfalls are rare; however, sleet occurs and rain commonly falls at temperatures around 5 °C (41 °F) or less. Frosts are a common occurrence during the winter and spring, though hampered by the frequent cloud cover.

Climate data for Bendigo Airport (YBDG) (1991–2020, extremes 1991–2025); 209 m AMSL; 36.74° S, 144.33° E
Month	Jan	Feb	Mar	Apr	May	Jun	Jul	Aug	Sep	Oct	Nov	Dec	Year
Record high °C (°F)	45.9 (114.6)	45.4 (113.7)	39.3 (102.7)	34.3 (93.7)	26.4 (79.5)	20.7 (69.3)	19.7 (67.5)	24.2 (75.6)	32.8 (91.0)	35.5 (95.9)	41.9 (107.4)	44.8 (112.6)	45.9 (114.6)
Mean maximum °C (°F)	40.6 (105.1)	38.3 (100.9)	34.5 (94.1)	28.7 (83.7)	22.2 (72.0)	17.4 (63.3)	16.6 (61.9)	19.4 (66.9)	25.0 (77.0)	30.7 (87.3)	35.3 (95.5)	37.9 (100.2)	41.4 (106.5)
Mean daily maximum °C (°F)	30.2 (86.4)	29.6 (85.3)	26.2 (79.2)	21.4 (70.5)	16.6 (61.9)	13.4 (56.1)	12.7 (54.9)	14.2 (57.6)	17.0 (62.6)	21.0 (69.8)	24.8 (76.6)	27.6 (81.7)	21.2 (70.2)
Daily mean °C (°F)	22.3 (72.1)	22.0 (71.6)	19.1 (66.4)	14.7 (58.5)	11.0 (51.8)	8.5 (47.3)	7.7 (45.9)	8.6 (47.5)	10.8 (51.4)	13.9 (57.0)	17.4 (63.3)	19.8 (67.6)	14.7 (58.4)
Mean daily minimum °C (°F)	14.3 (57.7)	14.4 (57.9)	11.8 (53.2)	8.0 (46.4)	5.3 (41.5)	3.5 (38.3)	2.7 (36.9)	2.8 (37.0)	4.5 (40.1)	6.8 (44.2)	9.9 (49.8)	12.0 (53.6)	8.0 (46.4)
Mean minimum °C (°F)	7.0 (44.6)	7.5 (45.5)	5.0 (41.0)	1.8 (35.2)	−0.8 (30.6)	−2.4 (27.7)	−2.7 (27.1)	−2.6 (27.3)	−1.7 (28.9)	0.4 (32.7)	2.8 (37.0)	5.0 (41.0)	−3.4 (25.9)
Record low °C (°F)	3.3 (37.9)	4.0 (39.2)	2.3 (36.1)	−1.3 (29.7)	−4.6 (23.7)	−5.3 (22.5)	−5.1 (22.8)	−5.0 (23.0)	−5.5 (22.1)	−3.5 (25.7)	−0.2 (31.6)	1.9 (35.4)	−5.5 (22.1)
Average rainfall mm (inches)	33.7 (1.33)	30.5 (1.20)	29.2 (1.15)	34.7 (1.37)	46.9 (1.85)	50.3 (1.98)	53.0 (2.09)	51.9 (2.04)	50.2 (1.98)	39.5 (1.56)	45.5 (1.79)	39.2 (1.54)	504.6 (19.88)
Average rainy days (≥ 0.2 mm)	6.0	5.2	5.2	6.7	11.6	13.0	15.6	13.8	11.7	8.7	7.7	6.9	112.1
Average afternoon relative humidity (%)	30	32	35	41	55	65	65	57	51	41	36	31	45
Source: Australian Bureau of Meteorology

==== Extreme weather events ====
A series of great floods occurred in Bendigo in 1859. Substantial flooding also occurred in 1903.

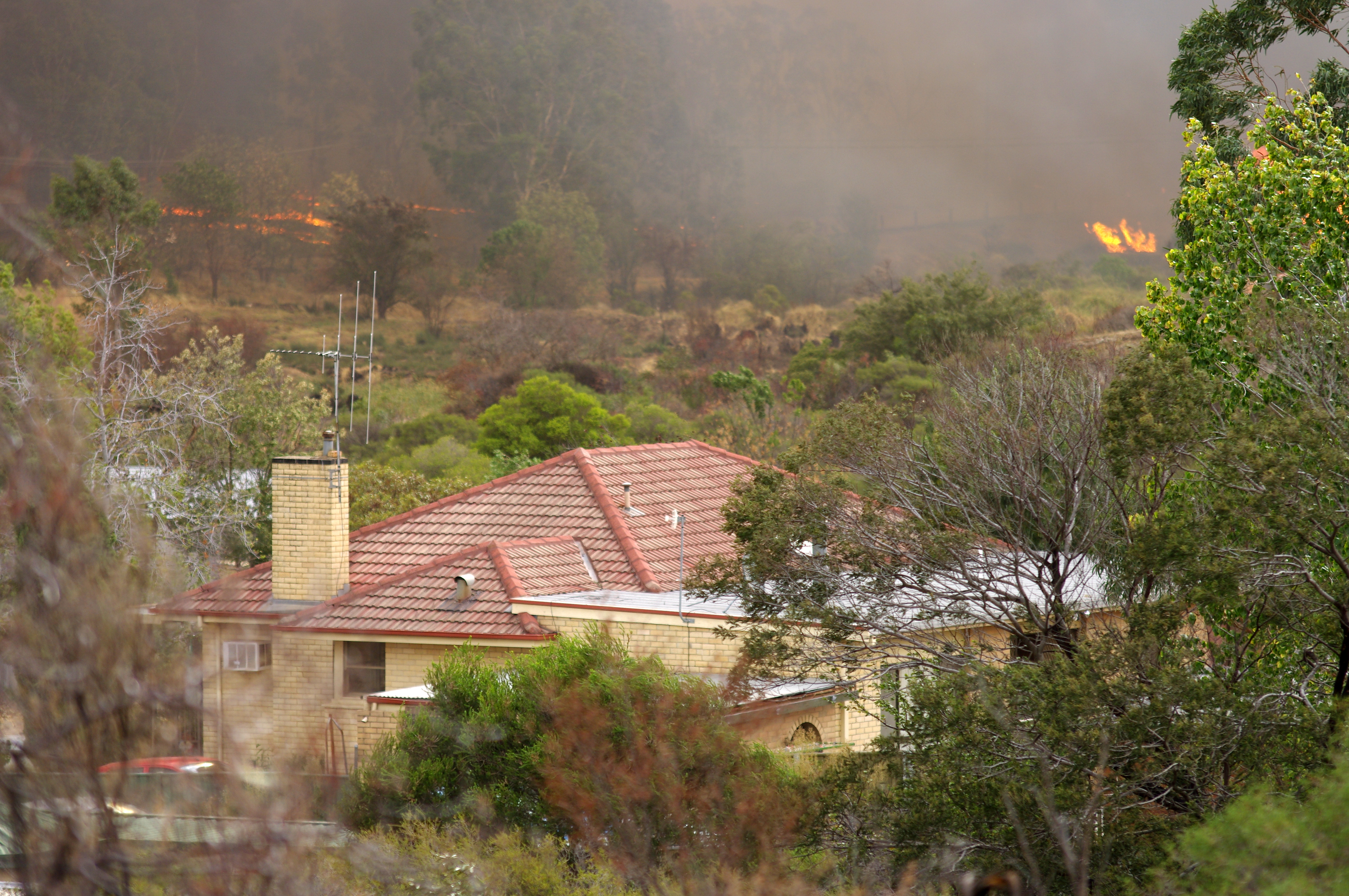
Fire threatening houses in Long Gully, west of Bendigo, during the 2009 Black Saturday bushfires

Tornadoes have been seen around the area of Bendigo and, although rare, the 2003 Bendigo tornado passed through Eaglehawk and other parts of the city causing major damage to homes and businesses.

Bendigo was in severe drought from 2006 to 2010 and, during this time, the city had some of the harshest water restrictions in Australia with no watering outside the household. Heavy rains from the middle to later months of 2010 filled most reservoirs to capacity and only wasteful water use (e.g. hosing down footpaths) is currently banned.

Bendigo was affected by the Black Saturday bushfires in 2009. A fire to the west of the city burned out 500 hectares (1,200 acres). The fire broke out at about 4.30 pm on the afternoon of 7 February and burned through Long Gully and Eaglehawk, coming within 2 km (1.2 mi) of central Bendigo, before it was brought under control late on 8 February. It destroyed about 58 houses in Bendigo's western suburbs and damaged an electricity transmission line, resulting in blackouts to substantial parts of the city. One fatality from the fire occurred.

Flash floods occurred across Bendigo during 2010, the first in March and the most severe at the beginning of September. The region also had flooding events in October 2022 and January 2024.

== Demographics ==
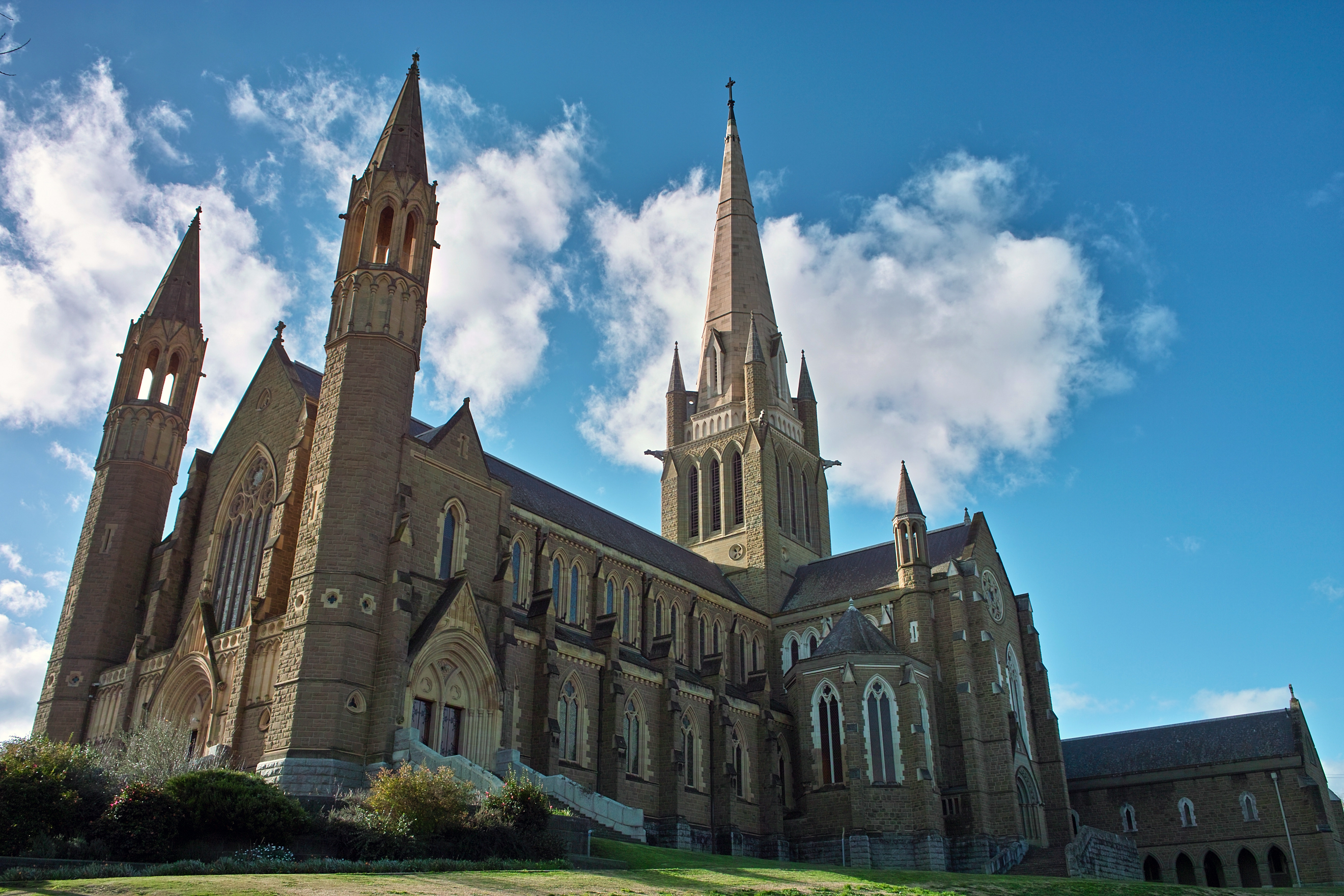
Sacred Heart Cathedral, Australia's third tallest church building

According to the 2016 census of population, 92,379 people were in the Bendigo Urban Centre.

- Aboriginal and Torres Strait Islander people made up 1.8% of the population.
- 84.6% of people were born in Australia. The next most common countries of birth were England 1.6%, India 0.7%, New Zealand 0.6%, Myanmar 0.5%, and Thailand 0.4%.
- 88.1% of people only spoke English at home. Other languages spoken at home included Karen 0.9%, Mandarin 0.5%, Malayalam 0.2%, Punjabi 0.2% and Hindi 0.2%.
- The most common responses for religion were No Religion 36.2%, Catholic 22.0% and Anglican 12.9%.

According to the City of Greater Bendigo Community Profile, the population estimate for 2019 for this area was 118,093 (0.39 persons per hectare).

=== Religion ===
In the 19th century, Catholicism was the predominant Christian tradition in Bendigo. Catholic priest and pioneer George Henry Backhaus established a site in 1852 for the first Masses at Golden Square and, by the end of the year, he was camping at the site of Bendigo's first church, St Kilian's Church, completed in 1858. A wealthy man, Backhaus left his estate for the benefit of the church which, in 1897, enabled the construction of Sacred Heart Cathedral. Completed in 1977, it is the largest church building in provincial Australia. As of 2016, Catholicism is still practised by 22% of the population. In the 2016 census, 36.2% reported having "no religion".

The Sandhurst Methodist Circuit (1854) serviced five Wesleyan churches which had been built in previous years. There were several church schools, but they were attended by one-fifteenth of Bendigo's school children.

The Chinese, who in the mid-19th century constituted 20% of Bendigo's population, built the heritage-listed Bendigo Joss House Temple dedicated to Kwan Tai or Lord Guan, where they practised syncretic beliefs involving ancestor worship and the three main religions of China: Buddhism, Taoism and Confucianism. Bendigo is also home to the largest stūpa in the Western world, the Great Stupa of Universal Compassion, which houses the Jade Buddha for Universal Peace, the world's largest gem-quality jade Buddha statue. As of 2016, Buddhism was followed by 1.4% of Bendigo people, and Islam by about 0.5%. In 2019, despite protests by several far-right and anti-Islam organisations, construction began on Bendigo's first mosque and Islamic community centre.

== Urban structure ==
=== City centre ===
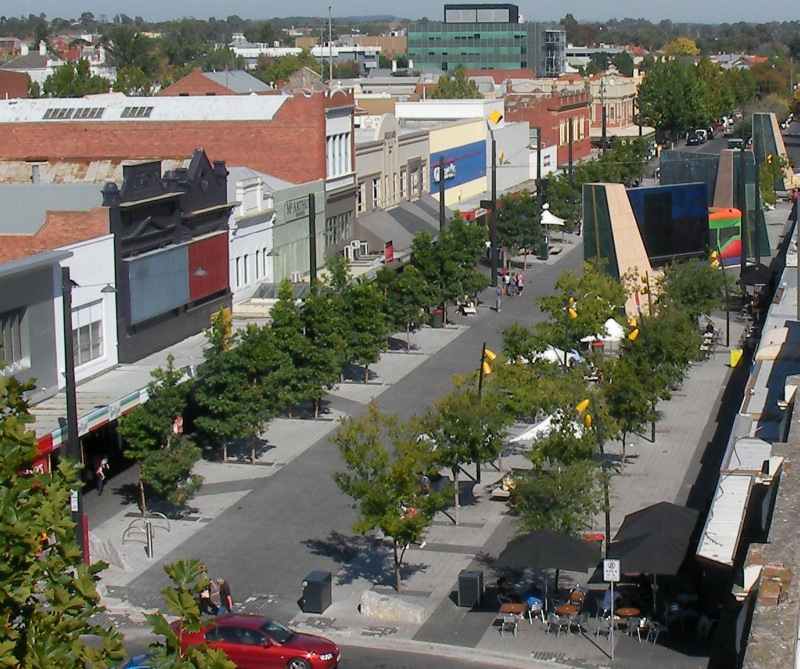
Hargreaves Mall, one of Bendigo's main shopping areas

The central area (CBD) of Bendigo consists of around 20 blocks of mixed-use area. The main street is the Midland Highway, the section running through the CBD is also known as Pall Mall. Hargreaves Mall, named after the gold prospector Edward Hargreaves, is one of the city centre's main shopping areas.

=== Suburbs ===
The contiguous urban area of Bendigo covers roughly 82 km^{2} of the local government area's 3048 km^{2}. Generally the suburbs occupy the catchment of the Bendigo Creek and its tributaries. Some suburbs, such as Eaglehawk, were once independent satellite townships. Some of the outer suburbs extend into the surrounding bushland.

Name	Population (2016)	Population (2021)	Postcode
Ascot	1,968	2,571	3551
Bendigo	6,143	5,652	3550
Big Hill	261	281	3555
California Gully	4,363	4,476	3556
Eaglehawk	5,691	5,538	3556
Eaglehawk North	5	0	3556
East Bendigo	2,092	2,246	3550
Epsom	4,325	5,014	3551
Flora Hill	3,955	3,989	3550
Golden Gully	211	213	3551
Golden Square	8,820	9,220	3555
Huntly	2,379	3,585	3551
Ironbark	1,095	1,163	3550
Jackass Flat	1,141	1,907	3551
Junortoun	3,201	3,862	3551
Kangaroo Flat	9,492	11,328	3555
Kennington	5,649	5,880	3550
Long Gully	3,383	3,420	3550
Maiden Gully	4,992	5,407	3551
North Bendigo	3,953	4,277	3550
Quarry Hill	2,339	2,365	3550
Sailors Gully	711	743	3556
Spring Gully	3,000	3,092	3550
Strathdale	5,663	5,756	3550
Strathfieldsaye	5,428	6,850	3551
West Bendigo	375	378	3550
White Hills	3,275	3,620	3550

=== Architectural heritage ===
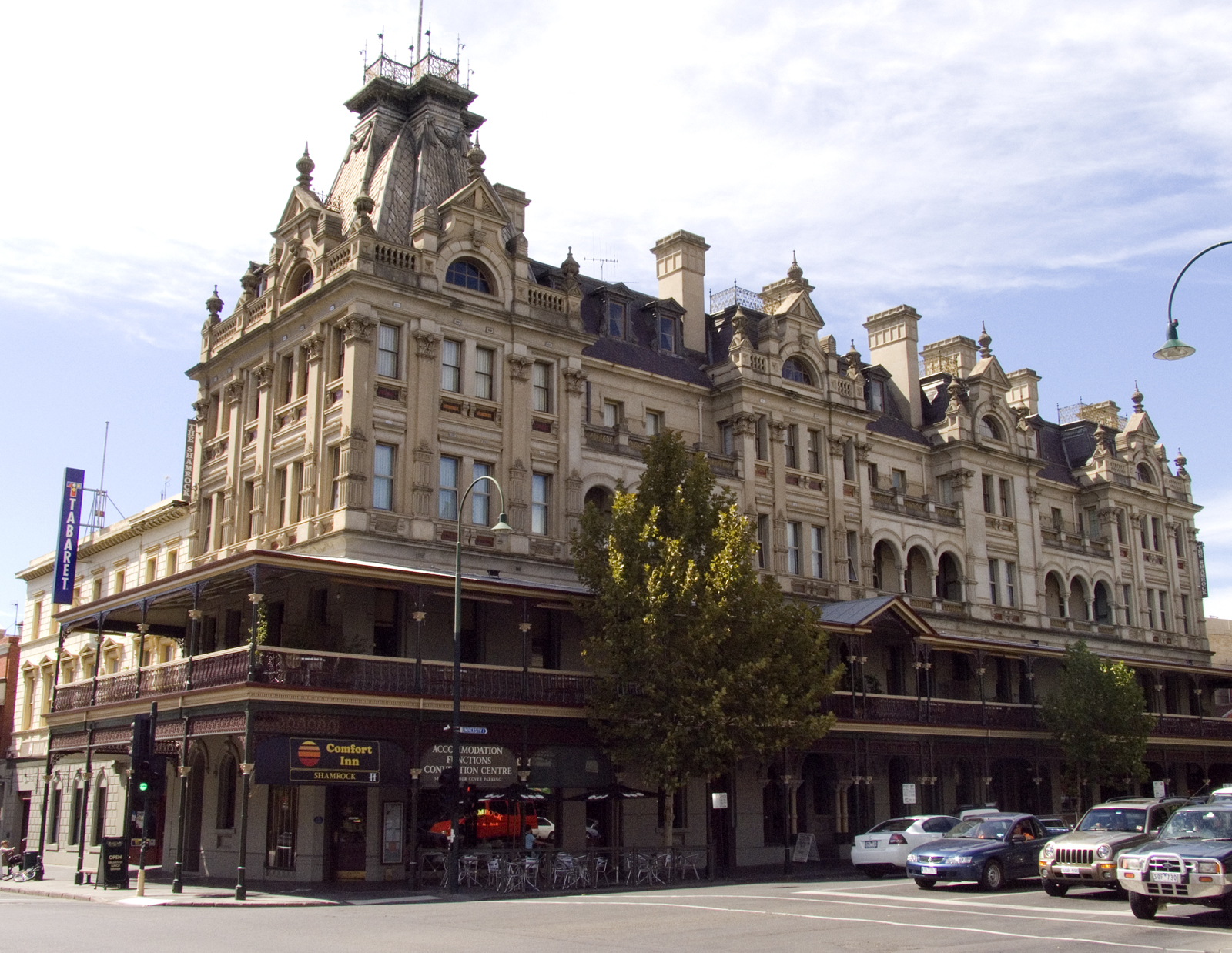
Established in 1854, Shamrock Hotel was rebuilt in 1897.

As a legacy of the gold boom, Bendigo has buildings built in a late Victorian colonial style. A number of buildings are on the Victorian Heritage Register and registered by the National Trust of Australia. Prominent buildings include the Bendigo Town Hall (1859, 1883–85), the Old Post Office, the Old Bendigo Law Courts Building (1892–96), the Shamrock Hotel (1897), the Institute of Technology, and the Memorial Military Museum (1921), all in the Second Empire style.

The architect William Vahland encouraged European artisans to emigrate to the Sandhurst goldfields and so create a "Vienna of the South". Bendigo's Sacred Heart Cathedral, a large sandstone church, is the third-largest cathedral in Australia and one of the largest cathedrals in the Southern Hemisphere. The main building was completed between 1896 and 1908 and the spire between 1954 and 1977.

Fortuna Villa is a large surviving Victorian mansion, built for Christopher Ballerstedt and later owned by George Lansell. Other examples of Bendigo's classical architecture include the Colonial Bank building (1887) and the former Masonic Hall (1873–74), which is now a performing-arts centre. Bendigo's Joss House, a historic temple, was built in the 1860s by Chinese miners and is the only surviving building of its kind in regional Victoria, which continues to be used as a place of worship. The historic Bendigo Tram Sheds and Power Station (1903) now house Bendigo's tramway museum. The Queen Elizabeth Oval still retains its ornate 1901 grandstand.

=== Parks and gardens ===
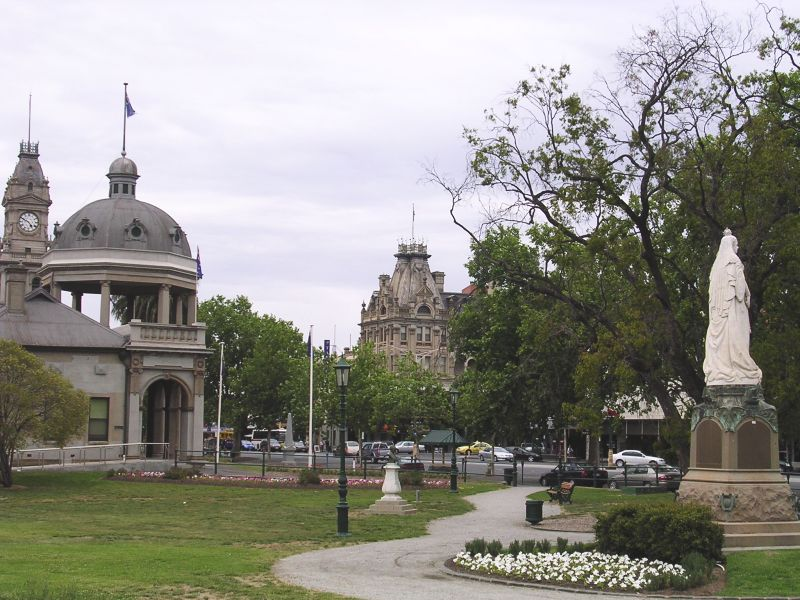
Rosalind Park featuring statuary and flanked by ornate Second Empire-style buildings

The central city is skirted by Rosalind Park, a Victorian-style garden featuring statuary and a large blue stone viaduct. The main entrance corner of the park is on the intersection known as Charing Cross, formerly the intersection of two main tram lines (now only one). It features a large statue of Queen Victoria.

The Charing Cross junction features the large and ornate Alexandra Fountain (1881) and is built on top of a wide bridge that spans the viaduct. The park elevates toward Camp Hill, which features a historic school and a lookout — a former mine poppet head.

Further from the city is Lake Weeroona, a large, ornamental lake adjacent to the Bendigo Creek. The Bendigo Botanic Gardens, which opened in 1869, are further downstream. Major redevelopment of the gardens has taken place in recent years.

The gardens are home to native species of animals, including brushtailed and ring-tailed possums, ducks, coots, purple swamp hens, microbats (small insect-eating bats), several species of lizards, owls, the tawny frogmouth, and though not native to the area, a colony of endangered grey-headed flying foxes (Pteropus poliocephalus).

== Culture and events ==
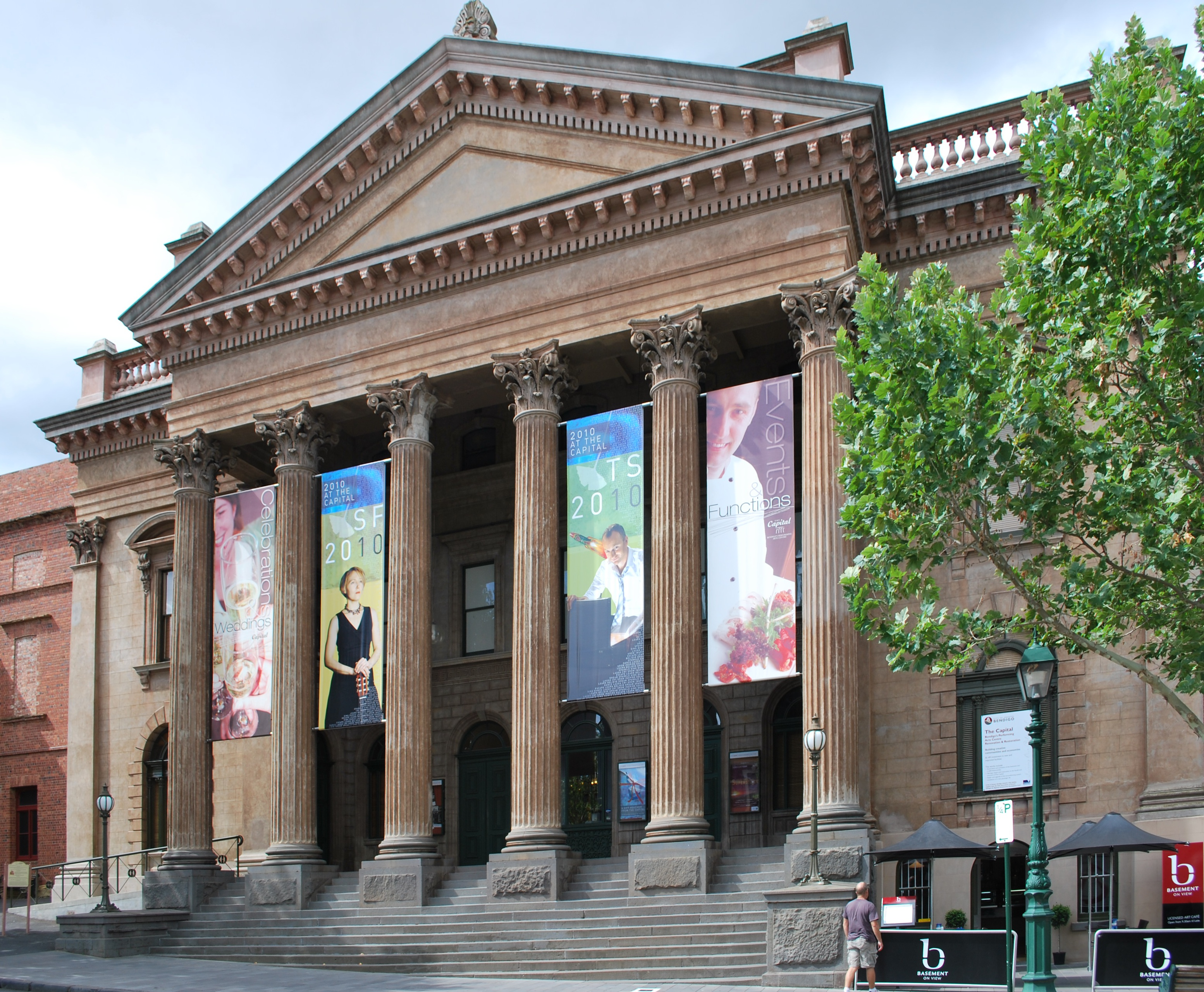
Capital Theatre

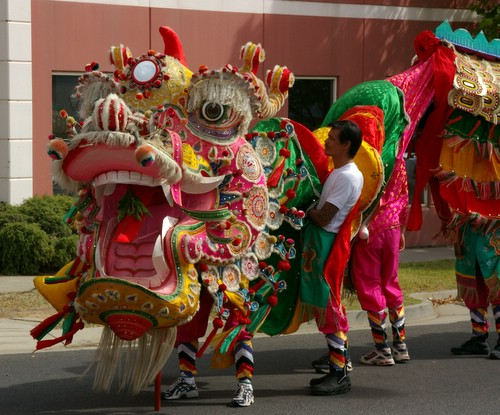
Bendigo is home to Sun Loong, the world's longest imperial dragon, a symbol of the city's Chinese heritage and a major drawcard of Bendigo's Easter Festival procession. For the remainder of the year, it is on display in the Golden Dragon Museum.

=== Venues ===
The Bendigo Art Gallery is one of Australia's oldest and largest regional art galleries. In March 2012, it hosted a royal visit from Princess Charlene of Monaco at the opening of an exhibition about Grace Kelly.

The Capital Theatre, originally the Masonic temple, is located next to the art gallery in View Street and hosts performing arts and live music.

The Ulumbarra Theatre was opened on 16 April 2015. It was originally the Sandhurst/Old Bendigo Gaol. The new theatre which seats nearly 1,000 people sits within the walls and structure of the jail and retains some original architectural features of the jail. The venue hosts performing arts and live music. It also acts as a ceremonial and teaching space for local secondary schools and universities.

=== Festivals and other events ===
The annual Bendigo Writers Festival was founded in 2012. It was boycotted in 2025 due to concerns over its code of conduct, when the festival cancelled the appearance of author Randa Abdel-Fattah. In January 2026 the festival organisers announced that the City of Greater Bendigo would partner with Goldfields Library "to deliver a range of literary events" in 2026, with operational planning continuing during the year to return to a full festival in 2027.

The city hosts the Bendigo National Swap Meet for car parts every year in early November. It is regarded as the biggest in the Southern Hemisphere and attracts people from all over Australia and the world.

The city hosts the Victorian leg of the annual Groovin' the Moo music festival. It is held at the Bendigo Showgrounds and is usually held in late April or early May. The festival regularly sells out and brings Australian and international acts to the city. It also attracts thousands of people from around Victoria to the city for the weekend.

The Bendigo Blues and Roots Music Festival has been taking place each November since 2011. With over 80 artists from all over Australia, the not-for-profit festival is hosted in a number of the venues around Bendigo, and is headlined by a large, family-friendly, free concert held in Rosalind Park.

The Bendigo Easter Festival is held each year and attracts tens of thousands of tourists to the city over the Easter long weekend. Attractions include parades, exhibitions, and a street carnival.

The Bendigo Queer Film Festival (BQFF) is one of Australia's few regional annual festivals celebrating the Queer film genre. The BQFF started in 2004 and takes place in the second half of April.

The Festival of Light is a multicultural celebration of peace and harmony inspired by the Buddha's birthday held in May each year since 2013 at the Great Stupa. The festival's program includes dancing and musical acts followed by a fireworks display at night.

=== Music ===
A number of live music venues offer local independent bands and artists performing on a regular basis. The Bendigo Town Hall also hosts music concerts and is a primary venue for the Bendigo Chamber Music Festival. Several adult choirs and the Bendigo Youth Choir often perform overseas; the Bendigo Symphony Orchestra, the Bendigo Symphonic Band, the Bendigo and District Concert Band, several brass bands and three pipe bands perform as well.

Musicians originally from Bendigo include Patrick Savage – film composer and former principal first violin of the Royal Philharmonic Orchestra in London. Australian Idol winner Kate DeAraugo grew up in Bendigo where her family still live.

=== Other cultural notes ===
In November 2019 Bendigo was recognised as a United Nations' City of Gastronomy.

Bendigo is home to a number of amateur theatre groups including the Bendigo Theatre Company, Tribe Youth Theatre and Nexus Youth Theatre.

== Media ==
Bendigo is served by two newspapers, the Bendigo Advertiser and the Bendigo Weekly, although in October 2019 the Bendigo Weekly was incorporated into the Bendigo Advertiser and now features as an insert in the Saturday edition of the Advertiser.

Eight locally based radio stations are active; 105.1 Life FM, Gold 1071am and 98.3FM, Hit 91.9, 3BO FM (broadcasting as Triple M) and ABC Central Victoria located on Napier Street, as well as the community radio stations Radio KLFM 96.5, Phoenix FM, Fresh FM and Vision Australia Radio 3BPH Bendigo 88.7 FM.

Network television is broadcast in the Bendigo region by the Seven Network, WIN Television (affiliated with the Nine Network), Network 10, the Australian Broadcasting Corporation (ABC) and the Special Broadcasting Service (SBS).

Of the three commercial networks, WIN Television airs a half-hour WIN News bulletin each weeknight at 5.30 pm, produced from a newsroom in the city and broadcast from studios in Wollongong.

Short local news updates and weather updates are broadcast by Network 10 throughout the day, produced and broadcast from its Hobart studios. The Seven Network airs short local news and weather updates throughout the day, produced and broadcast from its Canberra studios.

On 5 May 2011, analogue television transmissions ceased in most areas of regional Victoria and some border regions including Bendigo and surrounding areas. All local free-to-air television services are now being broadcast in digital transmission only. This was done as part of the federal government's plan for digital terrestrial television in Australia, where all analogue television transmission were being gradually switched off and replaced with DVB-T transmission.

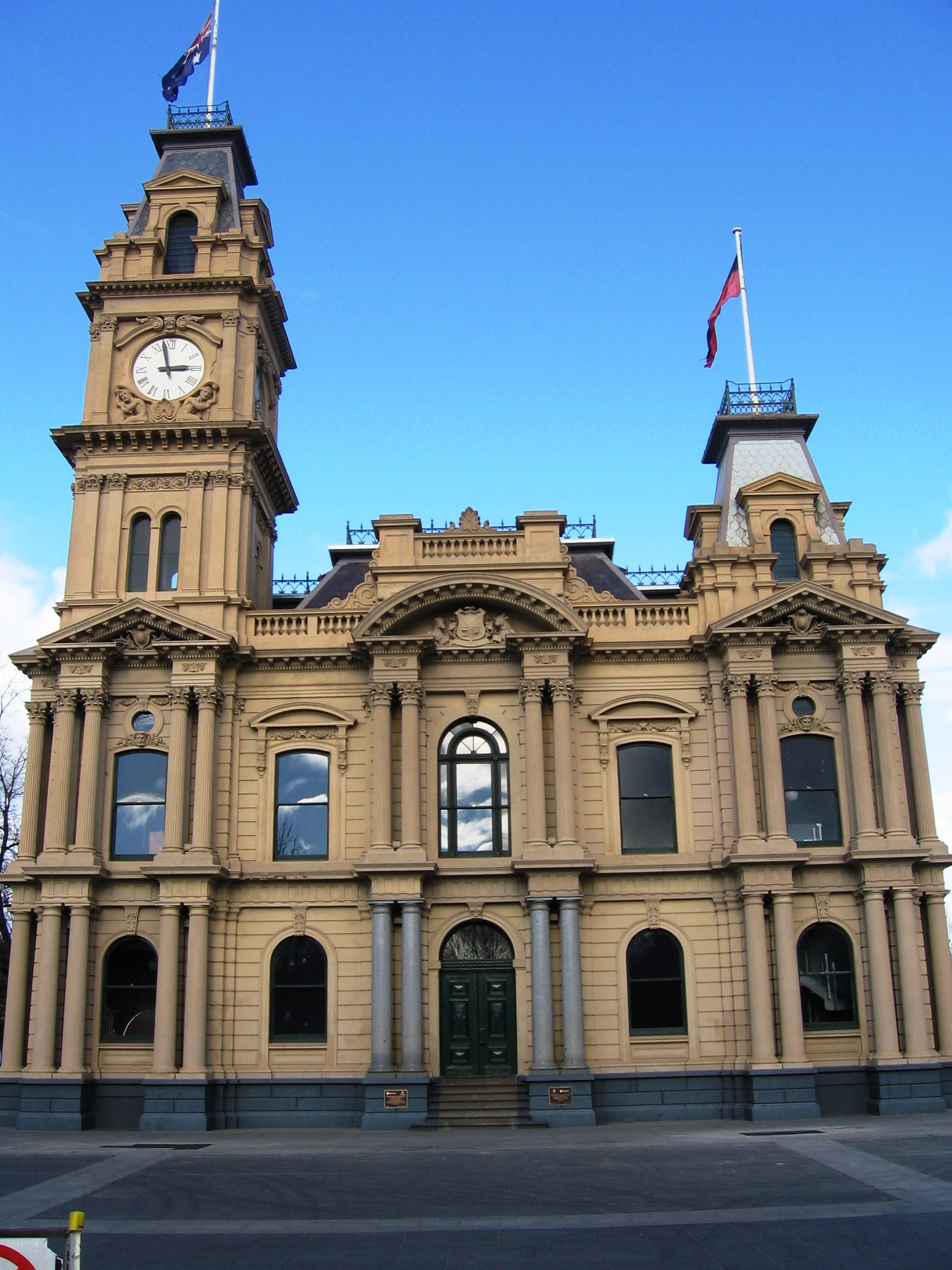
The Bendigo Town Hall, a popular venue for music concerts

== Sport ==
=== Cricket ===
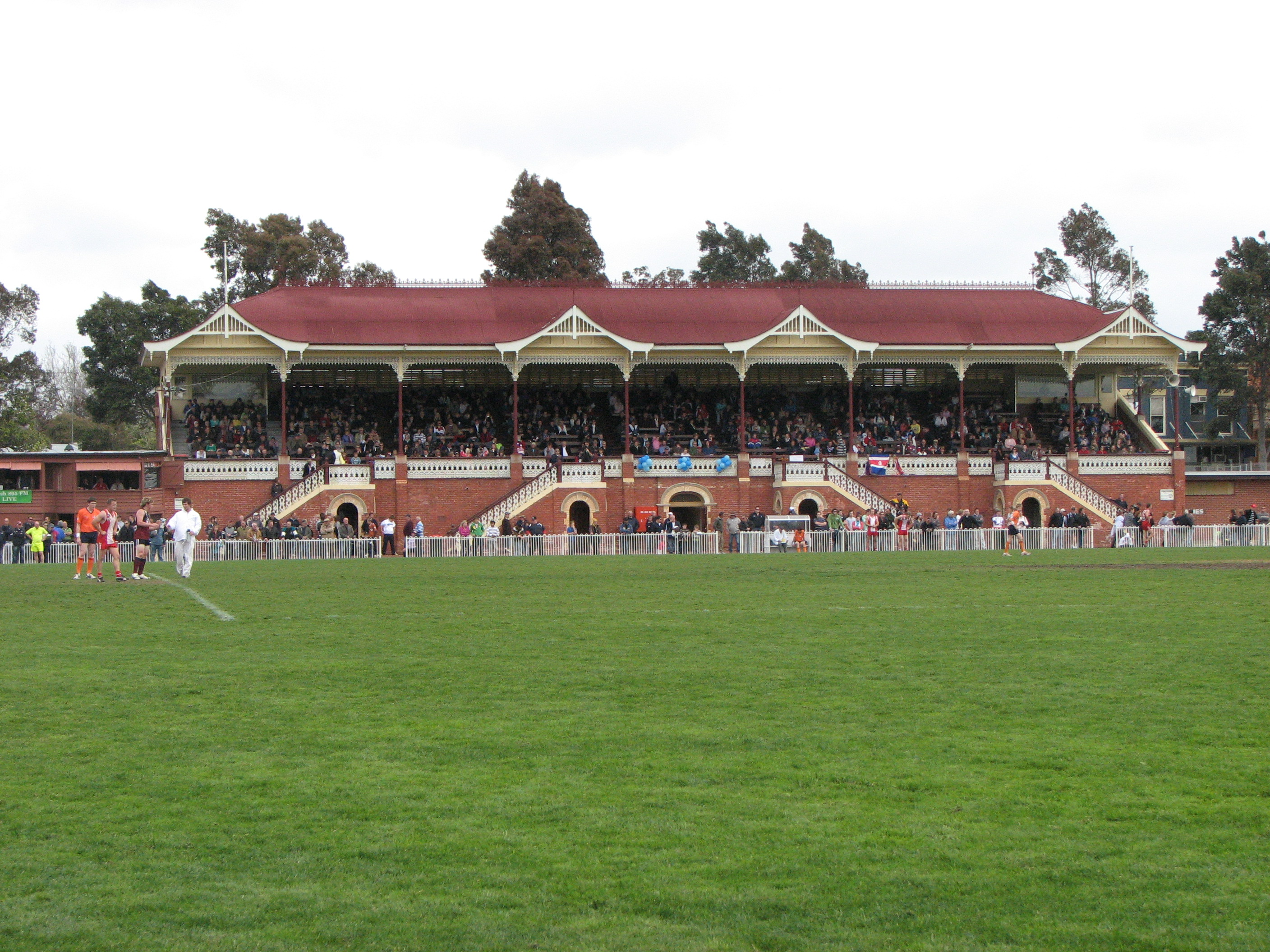
Queen Elizabeth Oval's 19th-century grandstand

Cricket and Australian rules football are the most popular sports in Bendigo. The Queen Elizabeth Oval (referred to locally as the QEO) hosts both sports. The Bendigo and District Cricket Association is the controlling body for 10 senior cricket clubs within the Bendigo area. The Emu Valley Cricket Association organises matches for 13 clubs around the Bendigo district, from Marong in the north to Heathcote in the south. Bendigo is a regional hub for state level sport, hosting football, cricket and other sports competitions annually.

The first women's cricket match in Australia was played in Bendigo in 1871.

=== Australian rules football ===
In terms of Australian rules football, Bendigo Gold were a semi-professional team which competed in the Victorian Football League until 2014. The Bendigo region is also home to the historic Bendigo Football League, a strong Australian rules competition featuring 10 teams from throughout the region. One of the league's founding member clubs, the Bendigo-based Sandhurst Football Club, was founded in 1861, making it one of the world's oldest football clubs. Other clubs from the city and surrounding region compete in the Heathcote District Football League and Loddon Valley Football Netball League.

=== Other sport ===
The Bendigo Cup is a prominent horse-racing event.

The Bendigo Stadium hosted basketball games during the 2006 Commonwealth Games. Bendigo's men's team is called the Bendigo Braves and the women's team is called Bendigo Spirit. In both 2013 and 2014, the women's team won the Women's National Basketball League championship. The city co-hosted the 2003 FIBA Oceania Championship.

The Bendigo Crushers are the city's rugby league club, competing in the Melbourne Rugby League competition.

Bendigo was the host to the second Commonwealth Youth Games, held from 30 November to 3 December 2004.

Bendigo International Raceway, which existed on the showgrounds, opened as the Golden City International Raceway in 1971 and held racing for classes including saloons and stock cars. The venue also hosted motorcycle speedway and hosted the Victorian Individual Speedway Championship in 1995.

== Economy ==
Bendigo is a large and growing service economy. The major industries are health, finance (headquarters of the Bendigo Bank – Australia's fifth largest bank), tourism, commerce, education, food processing and primary industries, with some significant engineering industries (see below under "Manufacturing").

Bendigo's growth has stimulated growth in small surrounding rural towns (such as Elmore, Heathcote, Rochester, Inglewood, Dunolly and Bridgewater).

=== Tourism ===
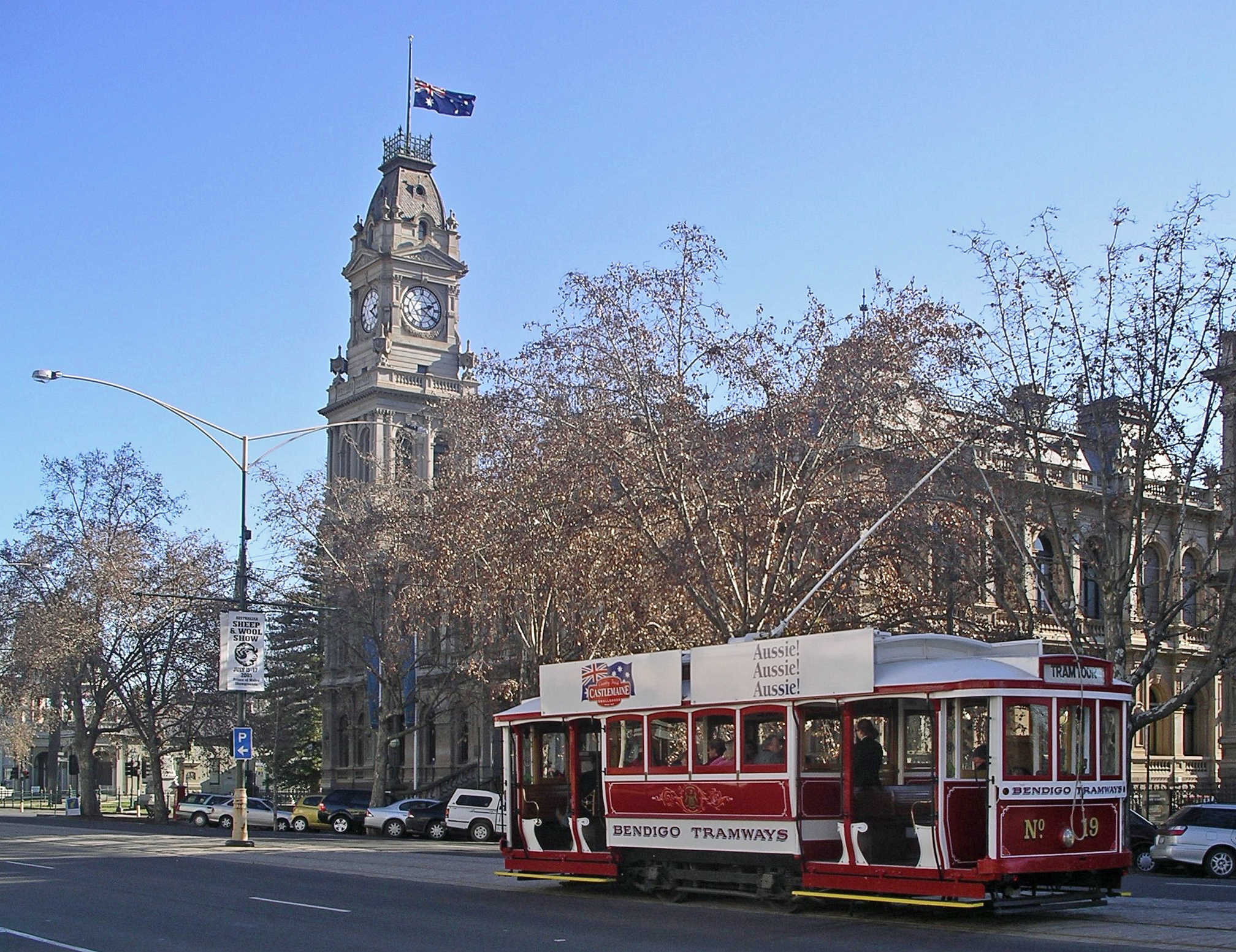
Tourist tram passing the Bendigo Post Office

Tourism is a major component of the Bendigo economy, generating over A$364 million in 2008/09. Bendigo is popular with heritage tourists and cultural tourists with the focus of tourism on the city's gold rush history. Prominent attractions include the Central Deborah Gold Mine, the Bendigo Tramways (both of which are managed by the Bendigo Trust, a council-intertwined organisation dedicated to preserving Bendigo's heritage), the Golden Dragon Museum, the Bendigo Pottery, and the Great Stupa.

=== Commerce ===
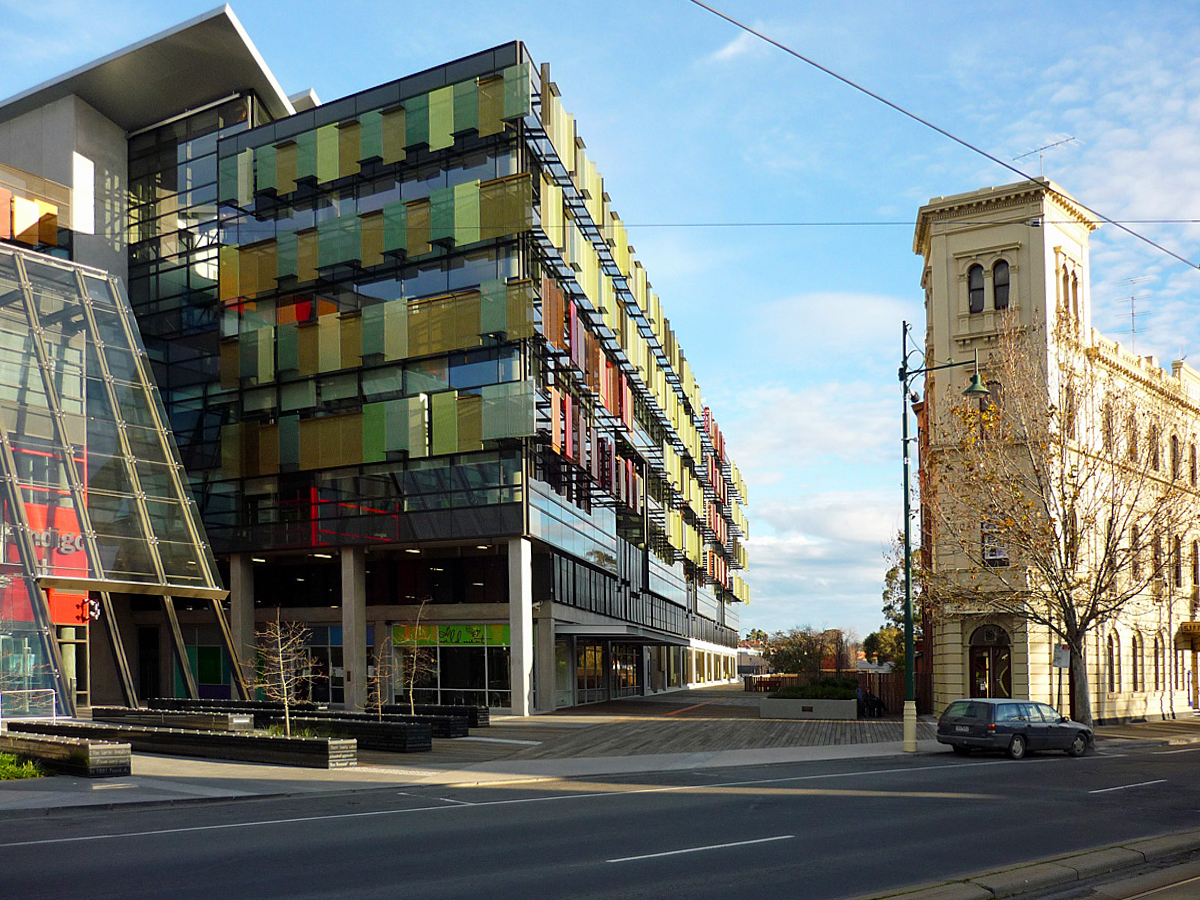
Bendigo Bank (left)

The main retail centre of Bendigo is the central business district, with the suburbs of Eaglehawk, Kangaroo Flat, Golden Square, Strathdale, and Epsom also having shopping districts.

The city was home to one of Australia's few provincial publicly listed share markets, the Bendigo Stock Exchange, founded in the 1860s.

The city is the home of the headquarters of the Bendigo Bank, established in 1858 as a building society. It is now a large retail bank with community bank branches throughout Australia. The bank is headquartered in Bendigo and is a major employer in the city (it also has a regional office at Melbourne Docklands).

=== Manufacturing ===
The City of Greater Bendigo Community Profile indicated that about 10.2% of the workforce were employed in manufacturing in 2011. After the Victorian gold rush, the introduction of deep quartz mining in Bendigo caused the development of a heavy manufacturing industry. Little of that now remains, but a large foundry (Keech Castings) makes mining, train, and other steel parts and a rubber factory remains (Motherson Elastomers, formerly Empire Rubber). Thales Australia (formerly ADI Limited) is an important heavy engineering company. Australia Defence Apparel is another key defence industry participant making military and police uniforms and bulletproof vests. Intervet (formerly Ausvac) is an important biotechnology company, producing vaccines for animals.

=== Education ===
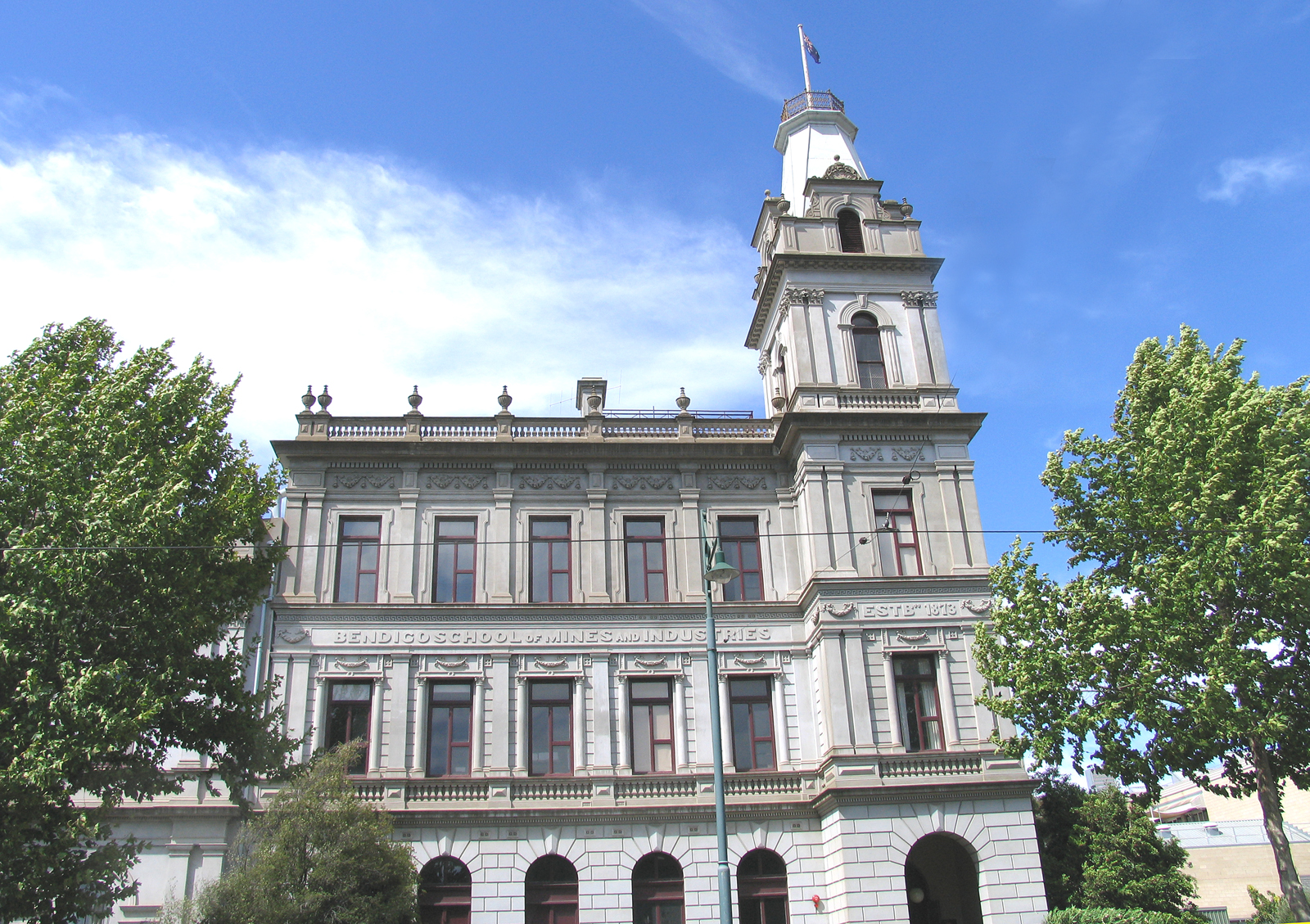
Bendigo School of Mines

The Bendigo Senior Secondary College is the largest VCE provider in the state. Catherine McAuley College follows close after, which ranges from years 7–9 at the Coolock campus and 10–12 at the St Mary's campus. Girton Grammar School, an independent school, provides education to students from years Prep-12. The Bendigo campus of La Trobe University is also a large and growing educational institution with nearly 5,000 undergraduates and postgraduates.

=== Farming and agriculture ===
The surrounding area, or "gold country", is quite harsh, rocky land with scrubby regrowth vegetation. The box-ironbark forest is used for timber (mainly sleepers and firewood) and beekeeping.

Sheep and cattle are grazed in the cleared areas. There are some large poultry and pig farms. Some relatively fertile areas are present along the rivers and creeks, where wheat and other crops such as canola are grown. The area produces premium wines, including Shiraz, from a growing viticulture industry. Salinity is a problem in some valleys, but is under control. A relatively small eucalyptus oil industry operates there.

Bendigo provides services (including a large livestock exchange) to a large agricultural and grazing area on the Murray plains to its north.

=== Gold mining ===
One of the major revolutions in gold mining (during the Victorian gold rush) came when fields such as Bendigo, but also Ballarat, Ararat and the goldfields close to Mount Alexander, turned out to have large gold deposits below the superficial alluvial deposits that had been (partially) mined out. Gold at Bendigo was found in quartz reef systems, hosted within highly deformed mudstones and sandstones or were washed away into channels of ancient rivers. Tunnels as deep as 900 metres (3,000 feet) (Stawell) were possible.

Until overtaken in the 1890s by the Western Australia goldfields, Bendigo was the most productive Australian gold area, with a total production over 622 tonnes (20 million ounces).

Over the 100-odd year period from 1851 to 1954, the 3,600-hectare area that made up the Bendigo gold field yielded 777 tonnes (25 million ounces) of gold.

A large amount of gold remains in the Bendigo goldfields, estimated to be at least as much again as what has been removed. The decline in mining was partly due to the depth of mines and the presence of water in the deep mines.

== Infrastructure ==
=== Transport ===
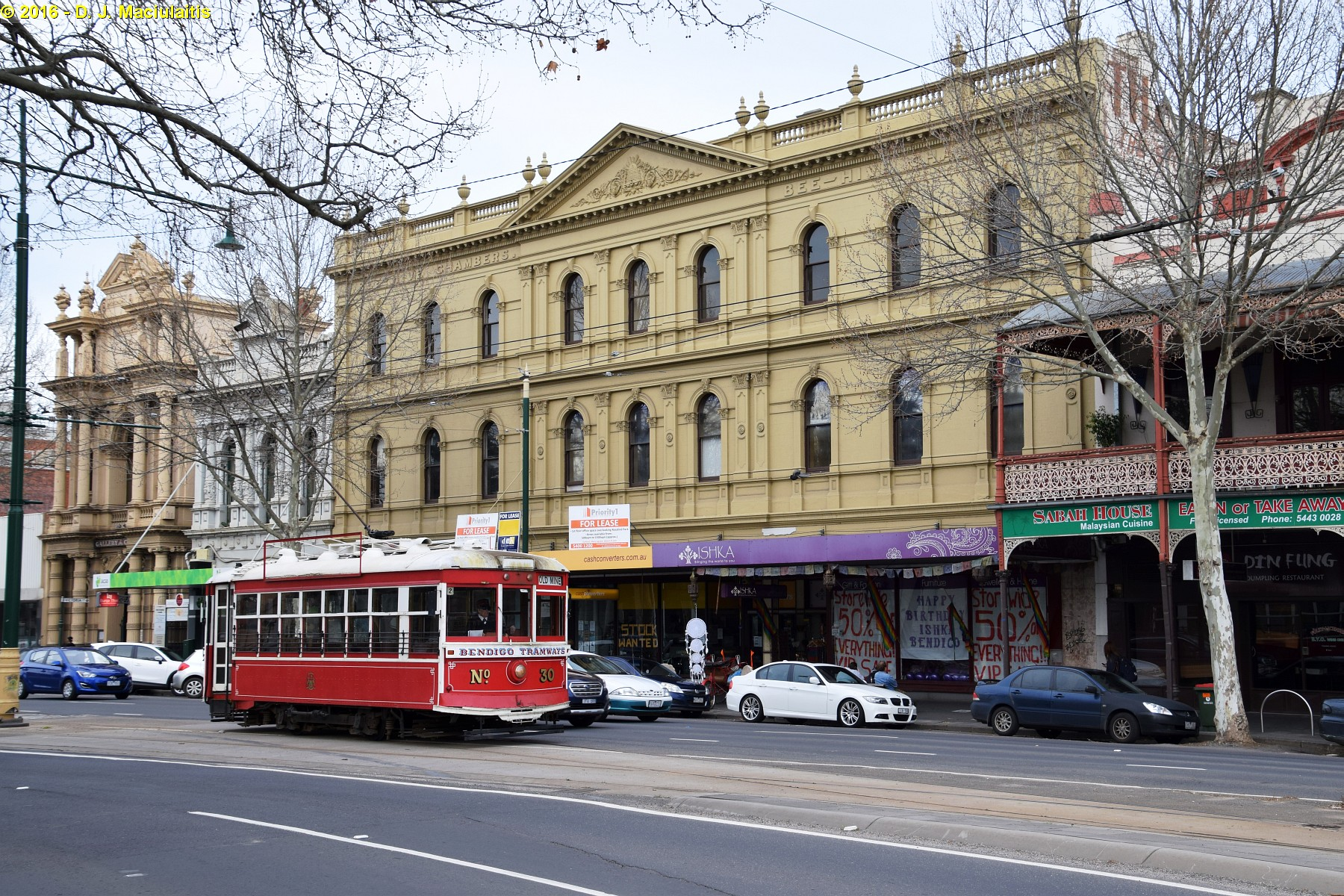
Tram on Pall Mall

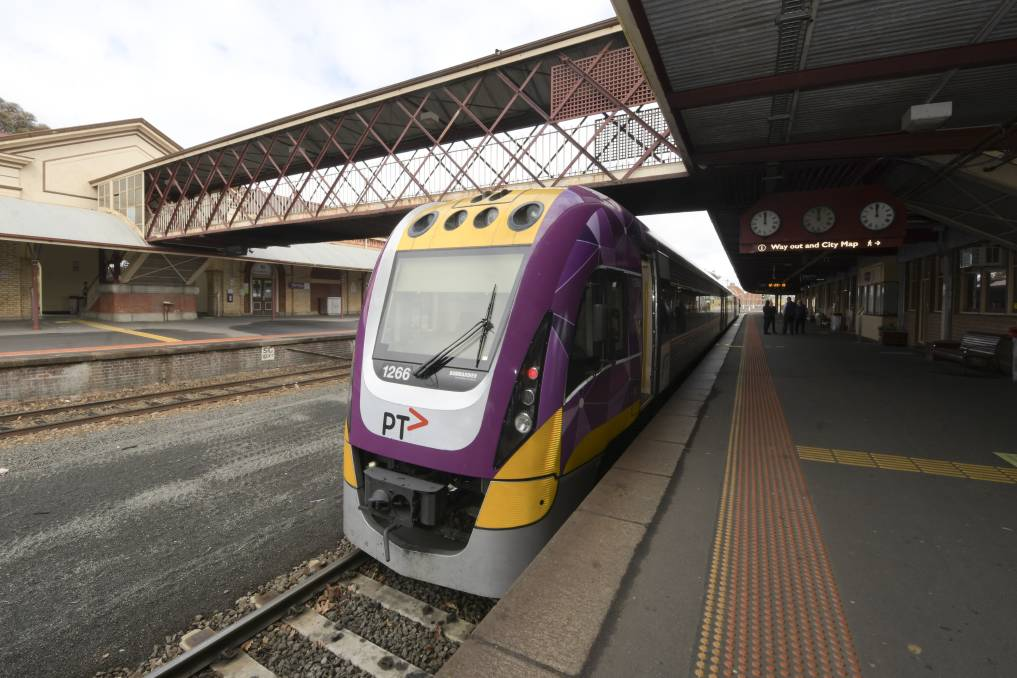
A Vline train at Bendigo railway station

Bendigo is connected via the Calder Freeway to Melbourne, which is fewer than two hours by car. The remaining section of highway nearest Bendigo has been upgraded to dual carriageway standard ensuring that motorists can travel up to speeds of 110 km/h (68 mph) for most of the journey. Other regional centres are also connected to Melbourne via Bendigo, making it a gateway city in the transport of produce and materials from northern Victoria and the Murray to the Port of Melbourne and beyond.

Bendigo acts as a major rail hub for northern Victoria, being at the junction of several lines including the Bendigo line which runs south to Melbourne and lines running north including the Swan Hill, Echuca and Eaglehawk–Inglewood lines. V/Line operates regular VLocity passenger rail services to Melbourne with the shortest peak journeys taking approximately 91 minutes from Bendigo railway station, generally however services take two hours or longer. While there are several rail stations in the urban area, only three other stations currently operated for passengers: Kangaroo Flat railway station on the Bendigo Line, Epsom Railway Station on the Echuca railway line, and Eaglehawk railway station on the Swan Hill railway line. There are also additional train services to and from Swan Hill and Echuca. The Regional Rail Revival project will upgrade the Swan Hill and Echuca lines and build three new stations. On the Echuca line, Huntly station (for the outer suburb of Huntly), Goornong Station (A town in greater Bendigo) and on the Swan Hill line Raywood station (A town in greater Bendigo) All set to open between 2021 and 2022. Residents celebrated the opening of the new Goornong Railway Station at a community event on the weekend of 11–12 December 2021.

Victoria's electronic ticketing system, Myki, was implemented on rail services between Eaglehawk and Melbourne on 17 July 2013.

Bendigo is also served by an extensive bus network that radiates mostly from the CBD with the main terminus at the railway station towards the suburbs. The city is also served by several taxi services.

Trams in Bendigo have historically operated an extensive network as a form of public transport, but the remains of the network were reduced to a tourist service in 1972. Short trials of commuter tram services were held in 2008 and 2009 with little ridership. The second, "Take a Tram", proved more successful, running twice as long as the previous trial. By the end of the "Take a Tram" program, ridership had increased and was increasing. However, due to lack of government subsidy or backing, the program ended.

Bendigo is served by the Bendigo Airport, which is located to the north of the city on the Midland Highway. The Bendigo Airport Strategic Plan was approved in 2010 for proposed infrastructure upgrades including runway extension and buildings to facilitate larger planes and the possibility of regular passenger services from major cities in other states. In 2016, Bendigo Airport was upgraded with a new taxiway system, new lighting, and a new 1.6-km north–south runway. On 10 December 2018, Qantas announced that they would fly between Sydney and Bendigo six times a week, the first of which commenced on 31 March 2019.

=== Health ===
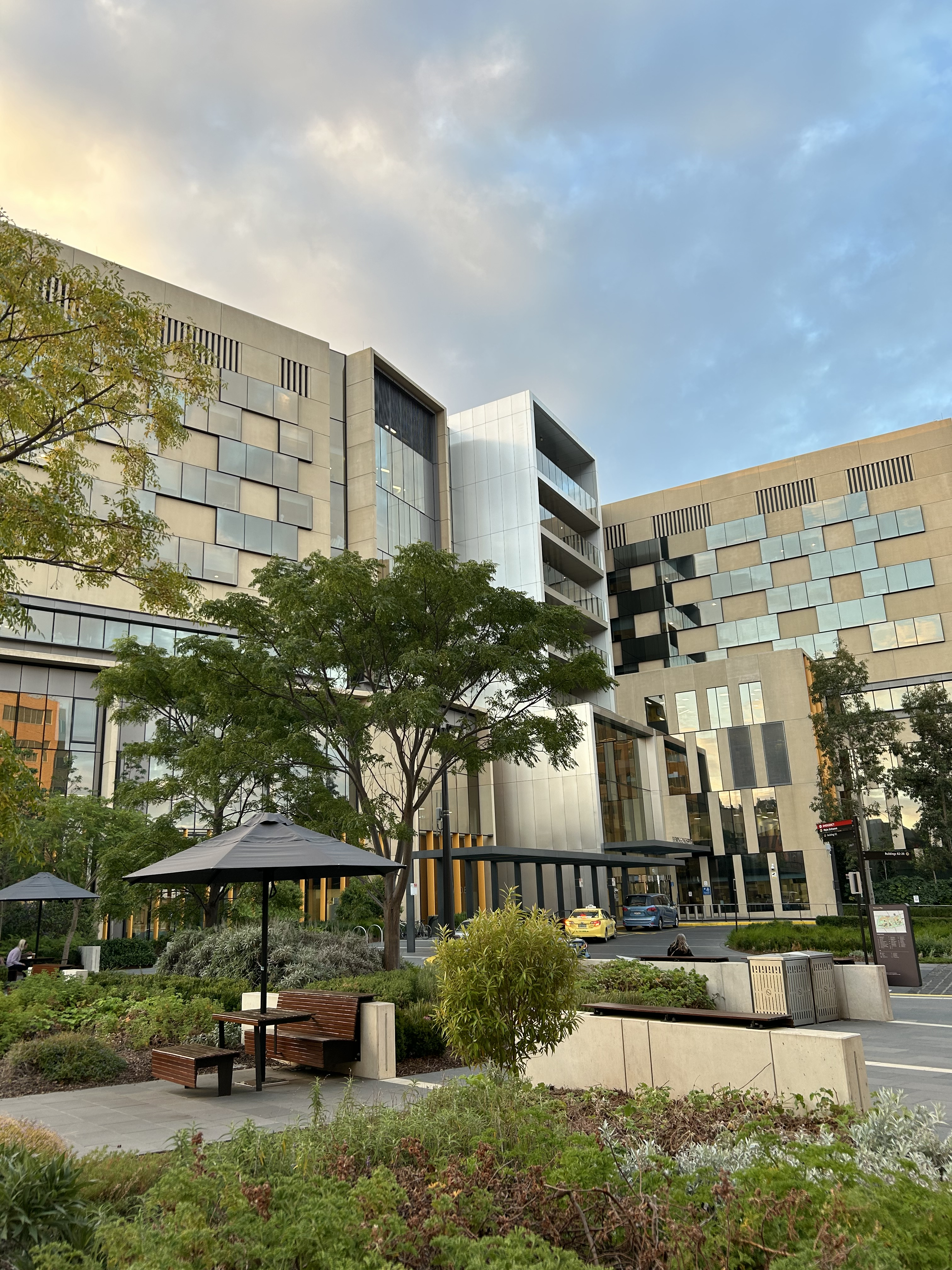
Bendigo Health

The Bendigo Base Hospital, now known as Bendigo Health, is the city's largest hospital, only public hospital and a major regional hospital. St John of God is the largest private hospital. Bendigo is also served by a privately owned smaller surgical facility, the Bendigo Day Surgery.

=== Utilities ===
Bendigo is entitled to a portion of the water in Lake Eppalock, an irrigation reservoir on the Campaspe River. Developments have led to the building of a pipeline from Waranga to Lake Eppalock and thence to Bendigo in 2007. In 1858 Bendigo water works hired Joseph Brady as an engineer and he designed nine reservoirs and a channel system called the Coliban main channel which provides water from the Malmsbury reservoir to customers in central Victoria.

== Sister cities ==
- Penzance, Cornwall, United Kingdom
- Los Altos, California, United States
- Tianshui, Gansu, China (1993–2013)

== Notable residents ==
Arts and entertainment

- Harold Desbrowe Annear, architect
- Bunney Brooke, TV actress
- Amy Castles, singer
- Ola Cohn, sculptor
- Kate DeAraugo, 2005 Australian Idol winner
- Colleen Hewett, singer and actress
- Russell Jack, founder of the Golden Dragon Museum
- Sam Jinks, sculptor
- Roger Kemp, artist
- Victor Kennedy, writer and journalist
- Keith Lamb, lead singer of Hush
- Sarah McKenzie, jazz singer, pianist and composer
- Ernest Moffitt, artist
- William Moore, art and drama critic
- William David Murdoch, concert pianist
- John Bernard O'Hara, poet and schoolmaster
- Alfred Henry O'Keeffe, artist
- Pollyfilla, drag performer and costume designer
- Ian Rilen, bass guitarist with Rose Tattoo
- Virginia Trioli, journalist and television host
- Christian Waller, artist
- Edward Warren, Perry Warren, members of Ironstone
- Lincoln Younes, actor

Business

- Herbert Robinson Brookes, businessman, pastoralist, public official and philanthropist
- Fletcher Jones, Australian entrepreneur
- Frank McEncroe, inventor of the Chiko Roll
- Sidney Myer, philanthropist and founder of the Myer chain of department stores
- Thomas Flanagan, co-founder of Kalgoorlie, Western Australia, in June 1893

Military

- Sir Gilbert Dyett, long-serving president of the Returned and Services League of Australia
- Carl Jess, Australian Army Lieutenant General
- John Campbell Ross, last Australian World War I veteran

Politics

- Jacinta Allan, Labor Premier of Victoria, 2023–
- John Bannon, Labor Premier of South Australia, 1982–1992
- Noel Beaton, Labor Federal Member for Bendigo 1960–69, Shadow Minister for Primary Industries 1967–69
- Frank Brennan, Federal Attorney-General of Australia, 1929–31
- Tom Brennan, older brother of Frank and federal UAP senator, 1931–37
- John Brumby, Labor Premier of Victoria, 2007–2010
- Daryl McClure (1947–2015) was Liberal member for Bendigo in the Victorian Legislative Assembly, 1972–1982
- Rod Fyffe (1949–2024), former mayor of Bendigo
- John Gunn, Labor Premier of South Australia, 1924–26
- Edward Heitmann, Federal Labor politician, 1917–1919
- John Lutey, Labor Party member of the West Australian parliament, 1917–1932
- Sir John Quick, Protectionist Party MP for Bendigo, 1901–1913. Knighted on 1 January 1901 for his contribution to Federation
- John Stanistreet (1913–1971) was Liberal Country Party Victorian Legislative Assembly Member for Bendigo 1955–1958
- Max Turner (born 12 February 1947) is a former Member for Bendigo West (1992–1996)
- Bruce Reid (30 July 1935 – 24 May 2020) was an Australian politician
- Peter Ryan, former leader of the Victorian National Party

Religion

- Sydney James Kirkby, Anglican bishop
- Thomas Cahill, Roman Catholic bishop

Science

- Martha Durward Farquharson, hospital matron
- John Irvine Hunter, professor of anatomy
- Frank Milne, professor of economics
- Struan Sutherland, antivenom researcher
- Geoffrey Watson, professor of statistics
- Kirby White, general practitioner

Sport

- Australian Football League players: Jim Mooring, Nathan Brown, Wayne Campbell, Nick Dal Santo, Jake Stringer, Eric Fleming, Trevor Keogh, Barry Mulcair, Troy Selwood, Adam Selwood, Joel Selwood, Scott Selwood, Geoff Southby, Colin Sylvia, Brian Walsh, Greg Williams
- Ben Hunt, NCAA and NBL basketball player
- Billy Murdoch, Australian Test cricket captain
- Chris Hamilton, professional cyclist
- Christine Envall, professional bodybuilder
- Craig White, English cricket player
- Don Blackie, Test cricketer
- Dyson Daniels, NBA basketball player
- Faith Leech, Olympic swimming champion
- Glen Saville, Australian and NBL basketball player
- Hannah Every-Hall, rower
- Kristi Harrower, Olympic basketball player
- Lisle Nagel, Australian Test cricketer
- Rhein Gibson, PGA Tour golfer and Guinness World Record holder for lowest golf round ever (55)
- Ricky Nixon, sports agent and former AFL footballer
- Sam Irwin-Hill, NFL punter
- Sharelle McMahon, Australian Netball Team captain, Melbourne Vixens captain
- Stephen Huss, 2005 Wimbledon men's doubles champion
- Barbara Rae (cricketer), played in first women's cricket match in 1874

== See also ==
- List of mayors of Bendigo
- Bendigo Easter Festival
- Bendigo South East College
- Crusoe Secondary College
- Great Stupa of Universal Compassion
- Flora Hill Secondary College
- Golden Square Secondary College
- Catherine McAuley College
- HM Prison Bendigo
- Sun Loong
- Victory Christian College
- Violet Street tram stop
- 2003 Bendigo tornado
- Ulumbarra Theatre
- Disappearance of Maureen Braddy and Allan Whyte
