= Martha Durward Farquharson =

Australian nurse and hospital owner

Martha Durward Farquharson (1847 Galway, West Region, Ireland – 12 August 1929, Bendigo, Victoria (Australia)) was an administrator, nurse and private hospital owner.

== Biography ==
Farquharson was the second of eight children born to John Farquharson and Anne Christopherson. In July 1861, they emigrated to Australia. A year later, her mother and a younger sibling died and her father remarried.

== Career ==
When she was 25, she went to England and taught at Mildmay Mission in East London which was run by evangelical Anglicans. In 1884, she entered their three-year nurses' training program at the affiliated Deaconess Nursing House. She returned to Australia in 1885, working as a nurse and was appointed matron of Coast Hospital (later Prince Henry's) at Little Bay. By 1888, she was Lady Superintendent at Sir Thomas Fitzgerald's Private Hospital in Spring Street, Melbourne followed by being Matron at Melbourne's Alfred Hospital.

Farquharson died in Bendigo, Victoria on 12 August 1929.

=== Legacy ===
In her memory, in recognition of her capabilities, the Martha D. Farquharson prize was established and awarded annually to the trainee nurse with the best practical skills in the Bendigo, Alfred and Royal Melbourne hospitals. A tree was planted in the gardens at the Bendigo Town Hall in her memory and to acknowledge Farquharson's work first as matron of Bendigo Hospital and later as a volunteer matron there.
