= Bendigo Town Hall =

Town hall in Bendigo, Victoria, Australia

Coordinates: 36°45′32″S 144°16′57″E

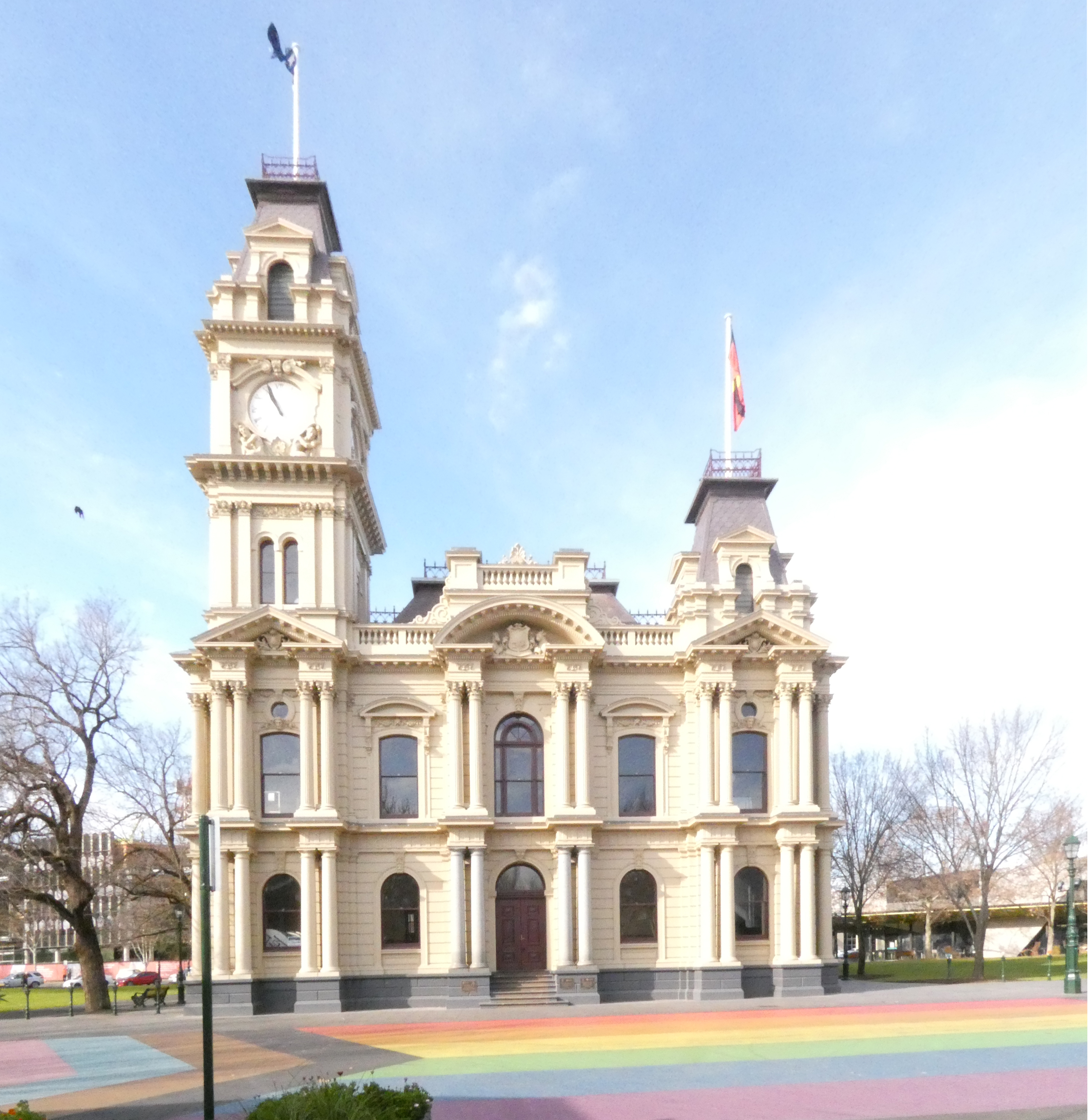
Bendigo Town Hall in June 2022

The Bendigo Town Hall is an Australian town hall prominently located at the intersection of Bull Street and Hargreaves Street in Bendigo, Victoria. It is considered one of the finest Victorian-era Second Empire buildings in Australia.

== Early history ==
The original Bendigo Town Hall was designed in 1859 by Bendigo's town clerk, George Avery Fletcher. A council chamber was added in 1866 and a hall for the trading of grain, known as the Corn Exchange, was added in 1871–72. Although the architecture of the additional buildings adhered to that of the original building, the completed building was unpopular with both the citizens and council of the era.

== Vahland rebuilding ==
In a series of major works from 1878 to 1902 the Bendigo Town Hall was transformed by the architect William Vahland who was given the task of converting the hall into something worthy of Bendigo's leading position as the "City of Gold". His work included extensive new offices, enlargement of the main hall and council chambers, the introduction of an interior decorative scheme, a clock tower and mansard roof. The exterior facades were also remodelled in the classical style.

Vahland commissioned Otto Waschatz, who had just decorated the Royal Palace in Copenhagen, Denmark, to design the hall's interior which featured decorative plaster adorned with 22-carat gold leaf, reflecting the opulence of the "city built on gold".

The result, completed in 1885, was one of Vahland's most significant works and has been considered the finest "boom style" building of its kind in Victoria.

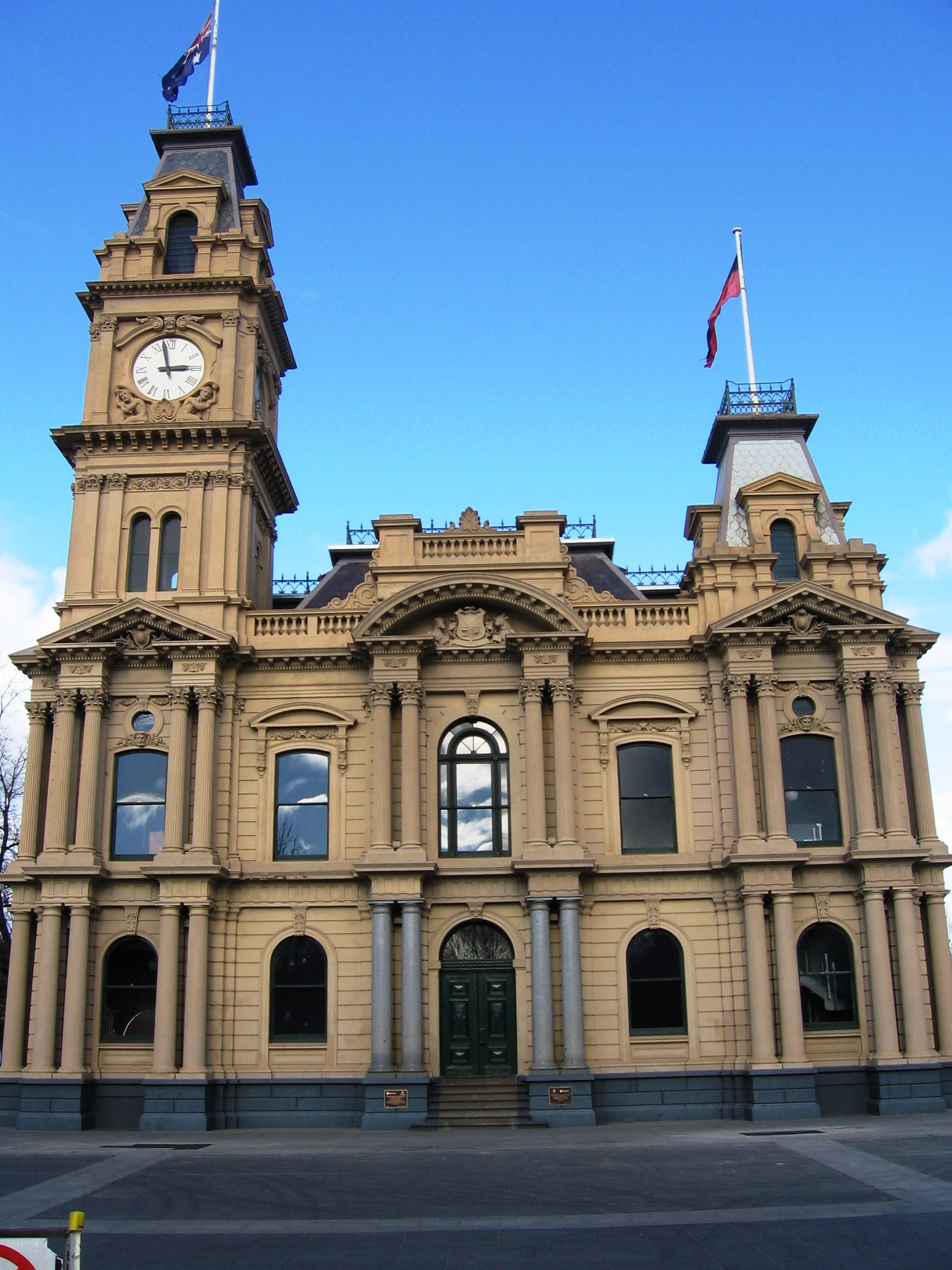
The hall in 2008

== Present day ==
In 2003, the Bendigo Town Hall was returned to its 19th-century splendour after an extensive restoration and renovation program including plasterworks, murals and gold leaf worked by artists and artisans.

The council of the City of Greater Bendigo meets in the council chambers at the council headquarters in the Bendigo Town Hall offices, which is also the location of the council's administrative activities.
