= William Vahland =

German-born Australian architect

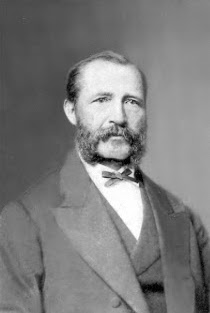
- Born: 2 October 1828; Nienburg an der Weser, Electorate of Hanover
- Died: 21 July 1915 (aged 86); Bendigo, Victoria, Australia
- Resting place: Bendigo Cemetery
- Occupation: Architect
- Buildings: Bendigo Town Hall, Shamrock Hotel

William Charles Vahland (born Carl Wilhelm Vahland; 2 October 1828 – 21 July 1915) was a German born and trained Australian architect who, after migrating to Bendigo in 1854 and becoming an Australian citizen on 20 July 1857, became known as the "premier architect of the Victorian goldfields".

Vahland designed over 200 buildings in North Central Victoria, including many of Bendigo's largest public and private buildings. By encouraging other European artisans and artists to emigrate to Bendigo, Vahland's aim was to realise a vision of the city as the "Vienna of the South".

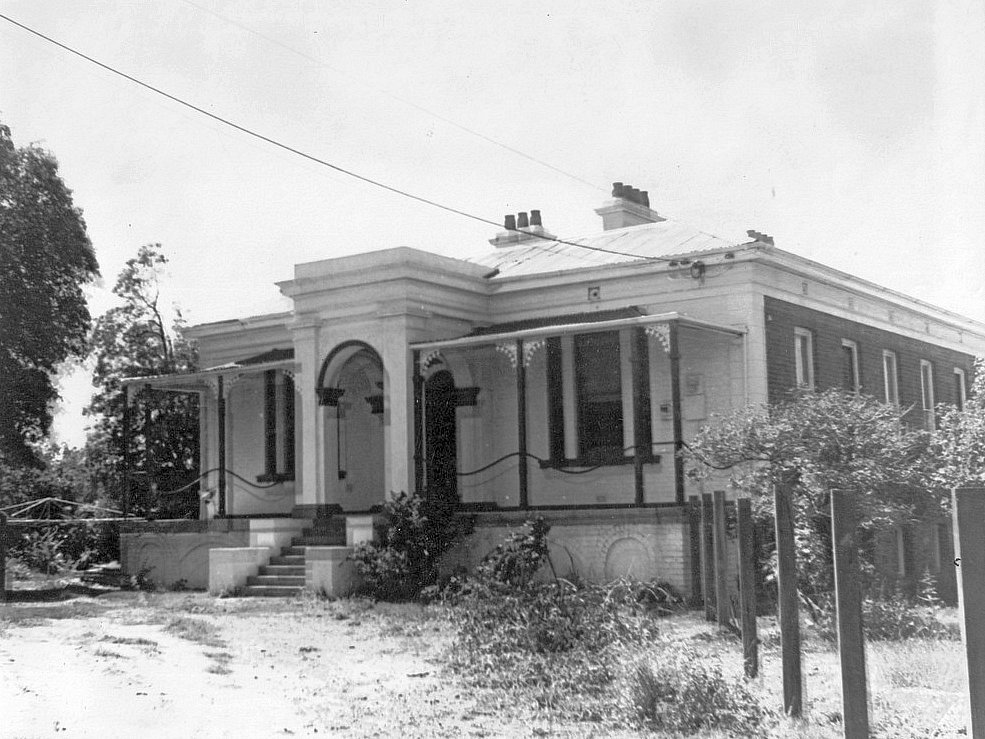
„Falkland House“ in Long Gully, 1870 to Henry Koch one of the richest people of Australia
