= Pollyfilla =

New Zealand drag queen

- Born: August 1978 (age 48); Lower Hutt, Wellington, New Zealand
- Other name: Colin McLean
- Occupations: Drag queen, entertainment, performing arts
- Years active: late 1990s–present
- Website: MySpace; Bebo

Colin McLean, known by her stage name Pollyfilla (born August 1978) is a New Zealand drag queen.

She has hosted or performed in front of thousands at the New Year's Eve celebration in Civic Square, Wellington. In June 2004, Pollyfilla and Colin McLean were featured at the Out Takes 2004 Lesbian & Gay Film Festival in a production which combined documentary footage with live performance.

== Recognition ==
Described as a "Wellington icon" by mayor Kerry Prendergast in 2005, Pollyfilla performed annually during the Summer City festivities in Wellington and opens many LGBT themed events and exhibitions. For several years she was the mistress of ceremonies at the annual Wellington Gay and Lesbian Fair and was frequently the host of the Miss Drag Wellington: Queen of Queens pageant. Ironically, Pollyfilla has never won the wellington title. In 2006 she starred in "The Life and Times of the Divine Miss P," described as "a sparkly, singing and dancing camp parody" with a color-coded troupe of dancers called The Dazzling Fillettes. The sold-out show was held at the BATS Theatre. Pollyfilla has been honoured many times for her work for the LGBT community and her contributions to Wellington's cultural fabric.

In January 2018, Pollyfilla was inducted in to the Melbourne Drag Awards Hall of Fame.

== Currently ==
McLean moved from Wellington in late 2006 to Melbourne, Australia, where Pollyfilla obtained a starring role in one of Melbourne's leading drag troupes, “New Sensation”. When New Sensation disbanded, Polly took on a starring role in the Xchange Hotel's production of Priscilla, Queen Of The Desert. Following the closure of this Thursday night production, Polly was offered the "Diva" role at The Commercial Hotel in Yarraville (West Melbourne), currently running Gay themed nights on Thursdays with specially selected guest performers and on Saturday nights with themed production shows. After a successful Christmas production show at the end of 2007, Polly returned with "That 1960s Show", also featuring the talents of Ooh La Roo and Coco LeBon. Early in 2008, Polly brought her one-woman show "Pollywood" across to Melbourne at Chapel Off Chapel. The Autumn season of "Diva Fever" saw Polly co-star with follow drag performer Missy Normous and guest performers. This production saw great success culminating with the finale in late April 2008, adding the first male diva guest to the lineup - Elvis. Polly's production show "Sex and The City" (tying in with the film in June 2008) showed at The Commercial Hotel during winter 2008 with three of Melbourne's top drag performers joining her for the drag event in Melbourne of that year.

== Colin McLean ==
Colin McLean was born in Wellington in August 1978, spending the first five years of his life in Raumati South and then moving with his family to Petone, a suburb of Lower Hutt. He attended Petone College, but dropped out before graduation, and took a job delivering mail at a Wellington law firm, where he worked for two and a half years. During this time, he began to do drag, designing and sewing his own costumes because it was less expensive than buying or renting costumes. McLean is openly gay.

As his designs became more complex, he applied to Wellington Polytechnic, where he was accepted into a two-year Fashion Diploma course. Finding its program inconsistent, he dropped out after one year, then enrolled at a government funded private training establishment (PTE) Bowerman School of Design six months later. He completed this program (although private, courses are taxpayer funded, elementary level) and went on to become a retail assistant for a fancy dress shop before leaving to work as a freelance designer and performer.

As a freelance designer, McLean has designed costumes for such shows as Hone Koukas—Home Fires, Awhi Tapu, and Strata (all produced by Taki Rua Productions), Gravity, The Expert, and others. McLean has appeared in drag on the television shows The Strip and Good Morning and in the films Stickmen and The Irrefutable Truth About Demons. His work as a theatrical costume designer and drag performer has been displayed at the Museum of New Zealand and The Dowse Art Museum.
