= Chinatowns in Australia =

Chinatown
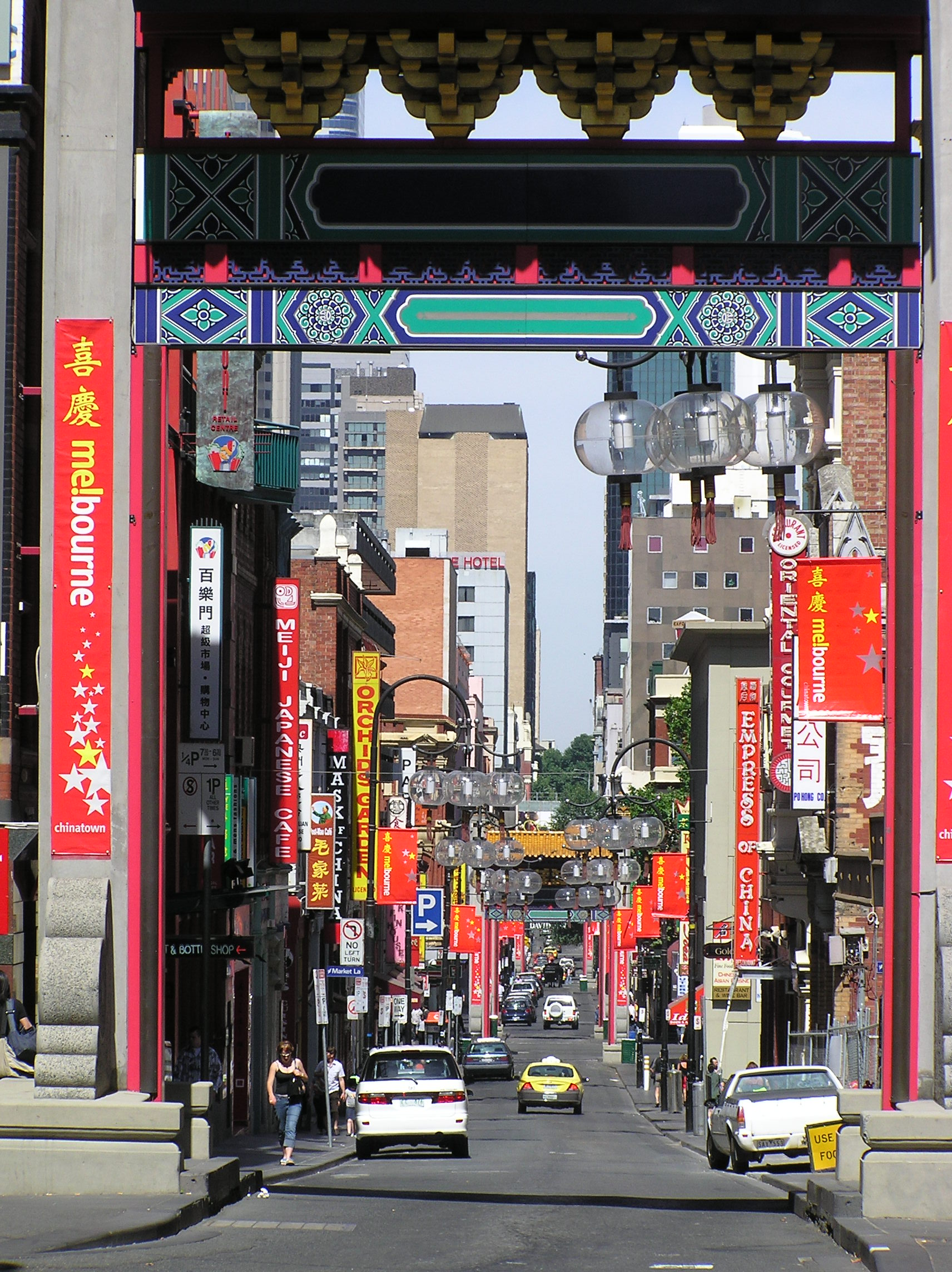
- Melbourne Chinatown
- Chinese: 唐人街
Transcriptions
Standard Mandarin
- Hanyu Pinyin: Tángrénjiē

Alternative Chinese name
- Traditional Chinese: 中國城
- Simplified Chinese: 中国城
Transcriptions
Standard Mandarin
- Hanyu Pinyin: Zhōngguóchéng

Second alternative Chinese name
- Traditional Chinese: 華埠
- Simplified Chinese: 华埠
Transcriptions
Standard Mandarin
- Hanyu Pinyin: Huábù

Chinatowns in Australia is a term used to describe major Chinese ethnic enclaves in Australia, especially those that claim to retain a strong Chinese cultural identity and a strong relationship with China. Chinatowns exist in most Australian states and territories, especially in the highly-populous and cosmopolitan capital cities but also in rural areas. Many large present-day Chinatowns in Australia have developed out of smaller historical Chinese settlements in Australia dating back to the 19th century. Chinese people first immigrated to Australia in large waves in the midst of the Australian gold rushes (beginning during the 1850s). Many of these people subsequently chose to return to China or were forcefully deported from Australia. The first known Chinese Australian was John Shying, who immigrated to Australia in 1818.

Australia has seen significant waves of Chinese and Overseas Chinese immigration for several decades since the 1970s, which was roughly when the White Australia policy (a white nationalist Australian ethnic policy that heavily restricted Asian immigration from 1901 until 1973) was completely dismantled. Australia is a popular destination for Chinese emigrants because of its high standards of living and relatively close geographic proximity to China, as well as because the Chinese Australian community is already well-established. The Chinese government, Chinese companies, and Chinese organisations also have strong interests in Australia and can provide an extensive support network for Chinese immigrants to Australia.

Because China restricted emigration up until 1983, prior to this year, most Chinese people came to Australia from Hong Kong (then a British colony, now a Chinese SAR), either as native Hongkongers or as Mainland Chinese passing through Hong Kong. Up until 1983, the largest Mainland Chinese immigrant community in Australia has consistently been the Cantonese Australian community, originating from Guangzhou City, Guangdong Province; both Guangzhou and Guangdong are commonly known as "Canton" in the English language. Most people in Hong Kong are descended from Guangzhou City (whether recently or distantly) and identify as Cantonese. Cantonese people living overseas are most easily recognisable by their usage of the Cantonese language, which belongs to the Chinese (Sinitic) language family.

In the present day, the collective Chinese Australian community consists of Chinese people originating from a variety of countries. The largest community of Chinese people in Australia is the Mainland Chinese, largely because many Mainland Chinese have been temporarily living in Australia throughout the past few decades in order to attend Australian universities. In Australian censuses, Hong Kong-born, Macau-born, and Taiwan-born people are recorded separately; Hong Kongese and Taiwanese people constitute some significant ethnic Chinese communities in Australia. There are also many Overseas Chinese people in Australia, mostly from Southeast Asian countries such as Indonesia, Malaysia, the Philippines, Singapore, Thailand, and Vietnam.

== Australian Capital Territory ==
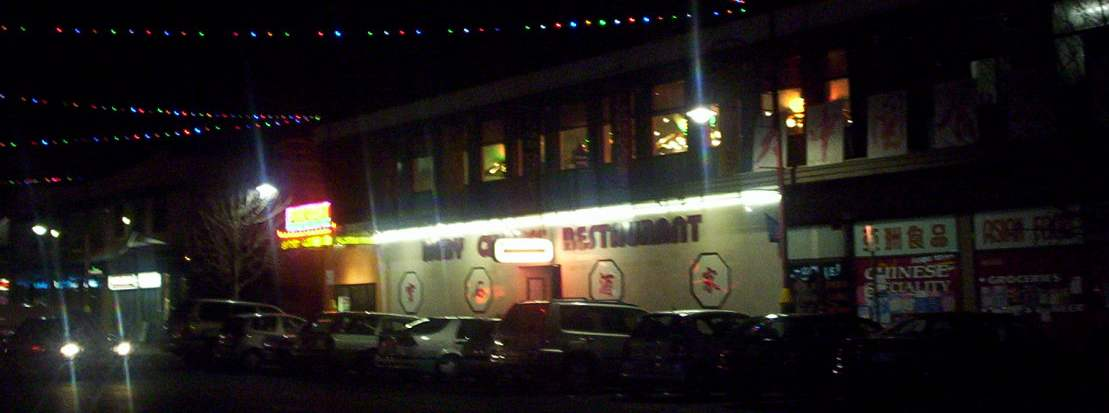
Woolley Street in Dickson at night, seen sometimes as Canberra's 'Chinatown'

A contemporary Chinatown exists at Woolley Street in the Dickson Centre. The Chinatown has become established fairly recently as a restaurant precinct.

== New South Wales ==
=== Sydney ===
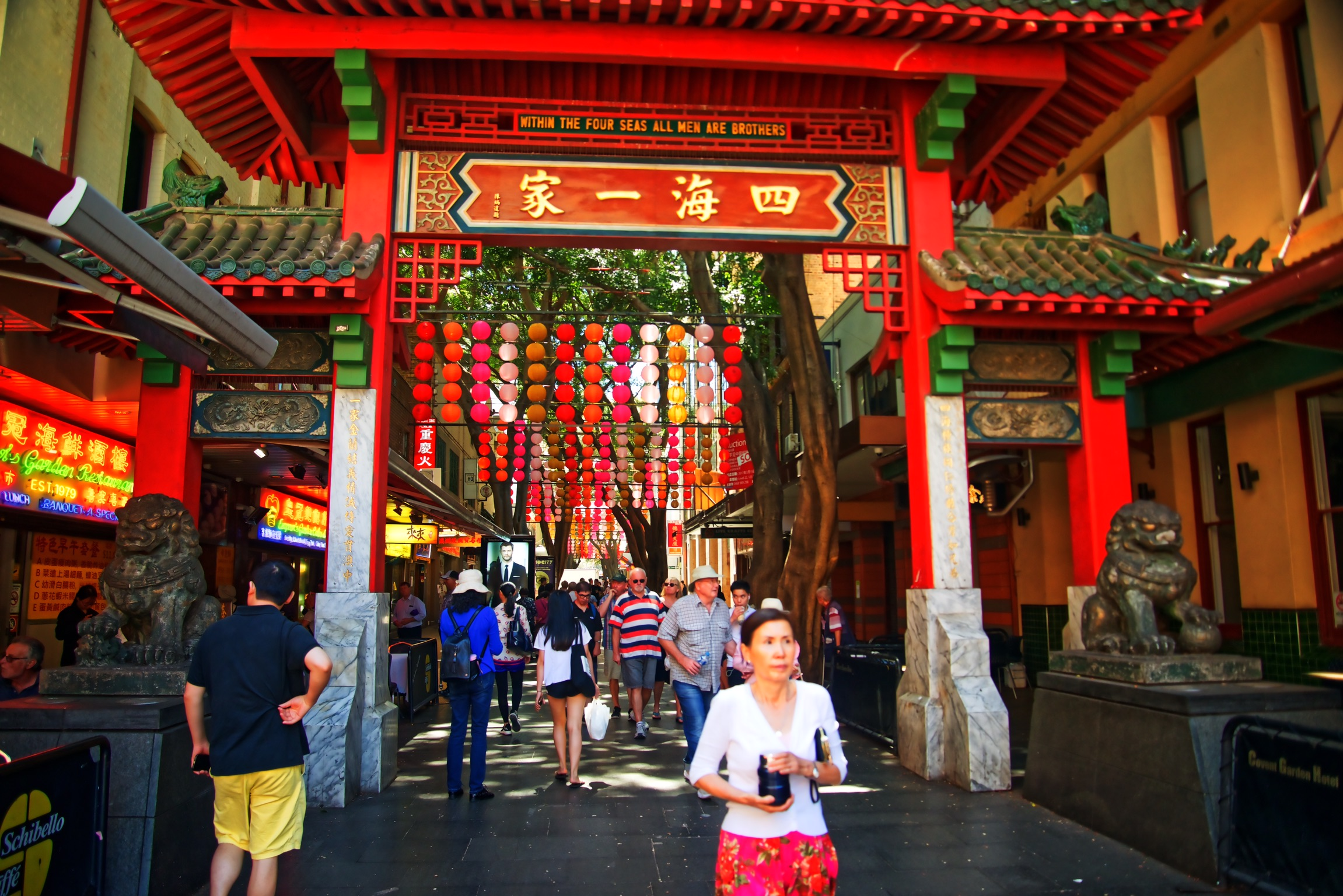
Paifang at Sydney's Chinatown.

Sydney's Chinatown has changed location twice. Originally in The Rocks area of Sydney, it later moved to the area near Market Street at Darling Harbour and finally to its current location in Haymarket, around parallel streets Dixon Street and Sussex Street. This Chinatown hosts various Chinese cultural activities such as the Chinese Youth League of Australia and Catholic Mass in Cantonese at the St Peter Julian's Church.

Other suburban Chinatowns have cropped up over the years in the suburbs of Ashfield, Auburn, Burwood, Cabramatta, Campsie, Chatswood, Eastwood, Parramatta, Hurstville and Kingsford.

=== Newcastle ===
Beaumont Street in Hamilton temporarily turns into a Chinatown for a week for Newcastle China Week, which starts yearly on 24 September. Although no permanent ones exist in the large city, many Asian supermarkets and restaurants are found around the area and the Hunter Valley. Plus, a large ethnic cluster of Chinese immigrants and citizens live in the city.

== Victoria ==
=== Ballarat ===
An extensive historical Chinatown existed in Golden Point, a district of the city of the gold field city Ballarat While the settlement no longer exists, it is remembered at nearby Sovereign Hill.

=== Bendigo ===
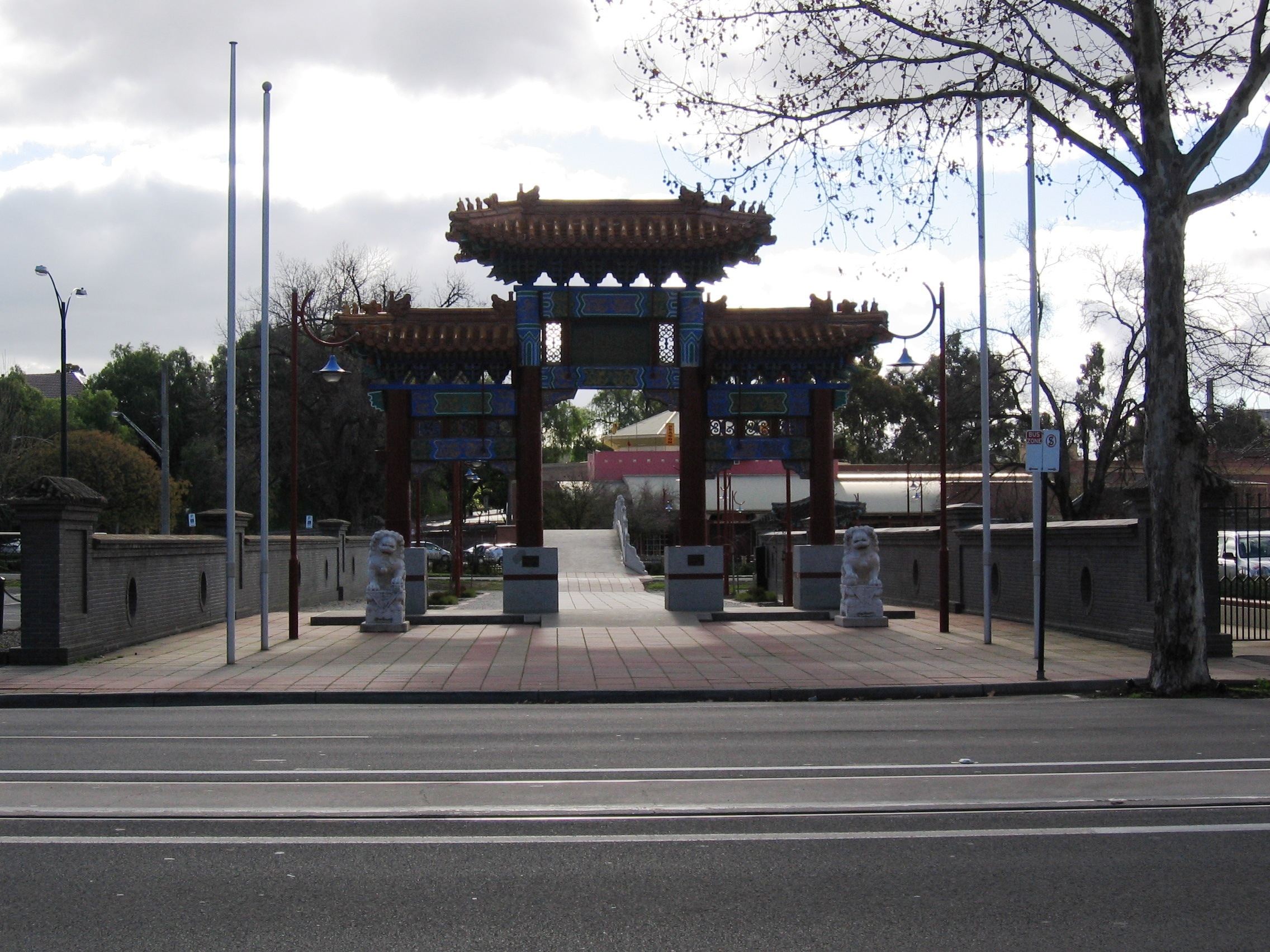
Chinese precinct entrance in Bendigo

Several Chinatowns were established in Bendigo during the Victorian Gold Rush of the 1850s and 1860s. These were the Chinese camps, of which there were seven established. The Ironbark camp in North Bendigo became the most prominent in the 1850s and 1860s. It continued to be the centre of Chinese life in Bendigo until it was ravaged by fire for a second time in 1911. A Joss House, one of Victoria's oldest, is the only thing remaining on the site. After the fire at the Ironbark camp, those Chinese still in Bendigo moved their operations to Bridge Street, nearer the centre of Bendigo. This Chinatown survived until 1964 when the council cited its declining use and dilapidated state as reasons for its demolition. A car park was put in its place. In 1991 the Bridge St Chinatown became the site of the Golden Dragon Museum which includes many relics from the city's Chinese heritage.

=== Castlemaine ===
A historic Chinatown existed in Castlemaine during the Victorian Gold Rush in the 1860s near the corner of Mostyn and Union streets (current site of the Albion Hotel) which included as many as five Joss Houses and a Chinese Mission Chapel.

=== Creswick ===
A historical Chinatown existed in Creswick during the Victorian Gold Rush in the 1850s. The settlement was depicted in Watercolor paintings artists by Burkitt (1855) and Norman Lindsay (1894).

=== Melbourne ===
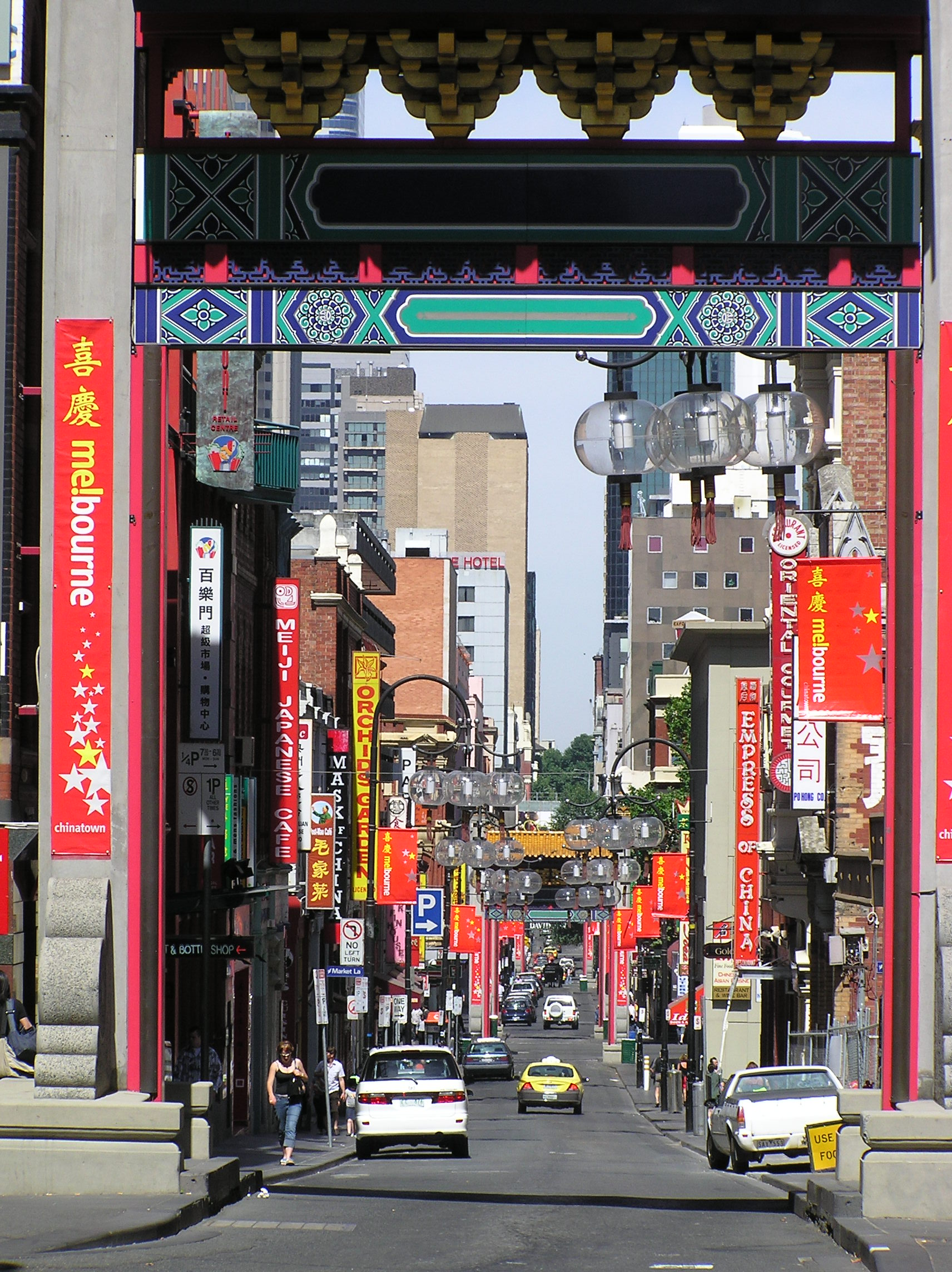
Melbourne Chinatown entrance in Little Bourke Street

Melbourne's Chinatown is in Little Bourke Street. It is notable as the oldest Chinatown in Australia, the oldest continuous Chinese settlement in Australia, and the longest continuously running Chinatown outside of Asia. Suburban Chinese communities, of a mostly Cantonese culture, are in Box Hill, Doncaster, Glen Waverley and Springvale. Melbourne's Chinatown boasts some world-famous cuisine, Flower Drum for example was voted as one of the best Chinese restaurants in the world by The New York Times. It was also the location where the Dim Sim, a popular Chinese-Australian snackfood commonly served in takeaway outlets throughout the country, was first invented by William Wing Young, at his restaurant Wing Lee, in 1945. Gift shops and souvenir shops also make up a large proportion of businesses. Melbourne Chinatown also houses the world's longest annually paraded Chinese dragon in the Melbourne Chinese Museum. This record is believed to have been held by the city since 1978 when the original Dai Loong dragon was commissioned, which was also the first Chinese dragon built in China since 1948. It was 92 metres long, had 6160 scales on its body and was initially paraded with a procession involving over 200 participants. In 2003, it was replaced with a new dragon, the Millennium Dragon, which was deliberately crafted in order to retain the record, and required 8 people to hold its head up. This later dragon is also locally known as Dai Loong, as some parts of the original 1978 dragon were reconditioned for use in the new dragon.

== Queensland ==
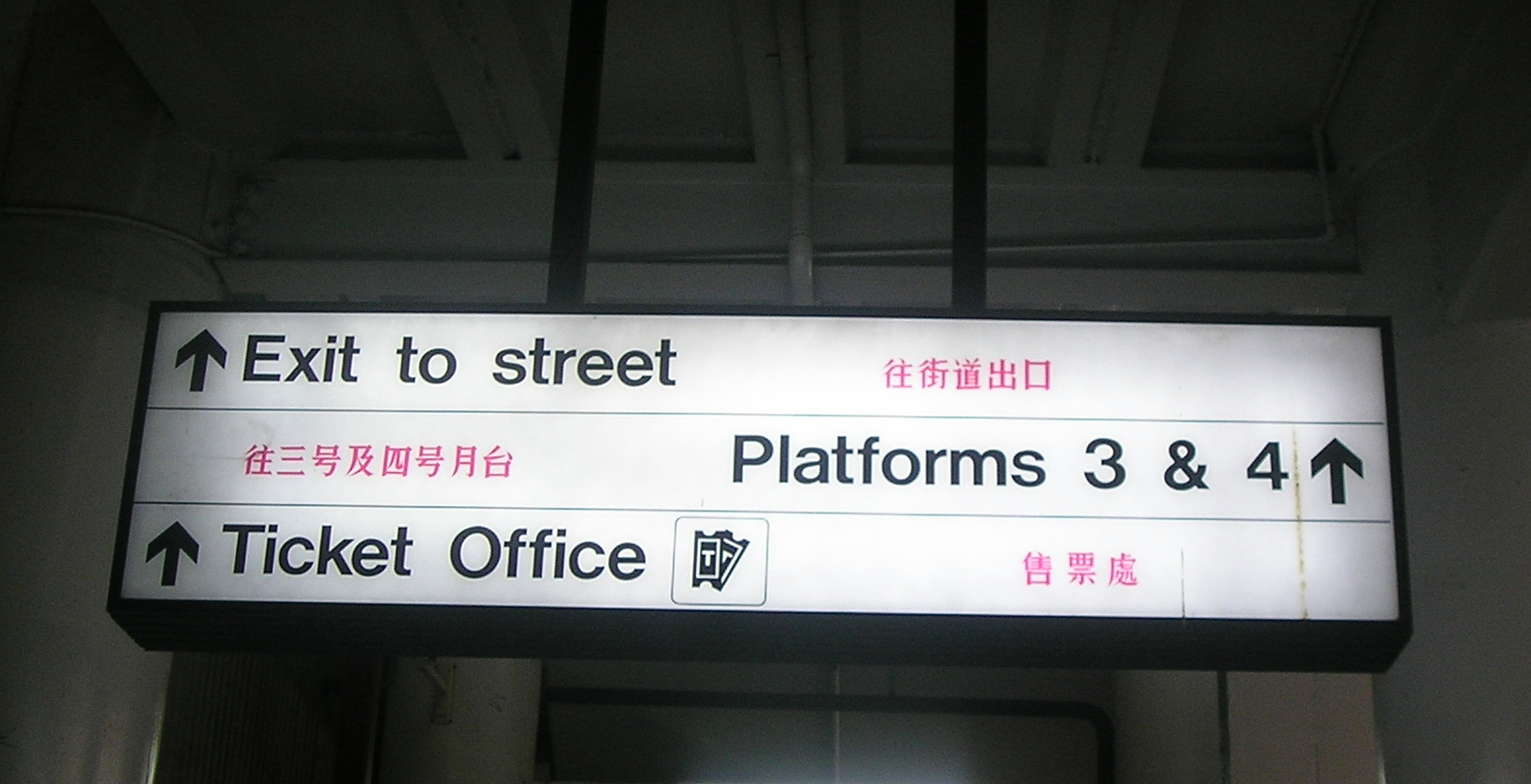
Bilingualism in suburban Fortitude Valley in Brisbane. Chinatown is located above ground.

=== Atherton ===
The Chinatown in Atherton is a heritage-listed settlement. It was built from 1880s to 1920s. It is also known as Cedar Camp. It was added to the Queensland Heritage Register in 1992.

=== Brisbane ===
The Chinatown of Brisbane is located in the suburb of Fortitude Valley, complete with its own Chinese gateway. Located near the Story Bridge, Chinatown is very popular for Australians too.

=== Gold Coast ===
A Chinatown on the Gold Coast is proposed for Southport. The proposed design includes three Peifang gates (arches) at each of the three entrances to Davenport and Young Streets.

Chinatown Gold Coast: The Chinatown precinct is an integral part of the revitalisation of Southport as an international CBD for the Gold Coast. Chinatown is being developed in partnership with the community, private sector and government and will be located on the light rail corridor in the centre of the CBD.

This modern Chinatown is focused on Young and Davenport streets in Southport. It is planned to be a place for the Gold Coast to celebrate its diversity through culture, design, people and food. Chinatown will be a mix of restaurants, cultural festivals and boutique; a place of cultural indulgence and celebration.

A four-metre-high (13 ft) statue of Confucius was unveiled and soon, three paifangs – traditional Chinese gateways – will mark the entries to the precinct.

== South Australia ==
=== Adelaide ===
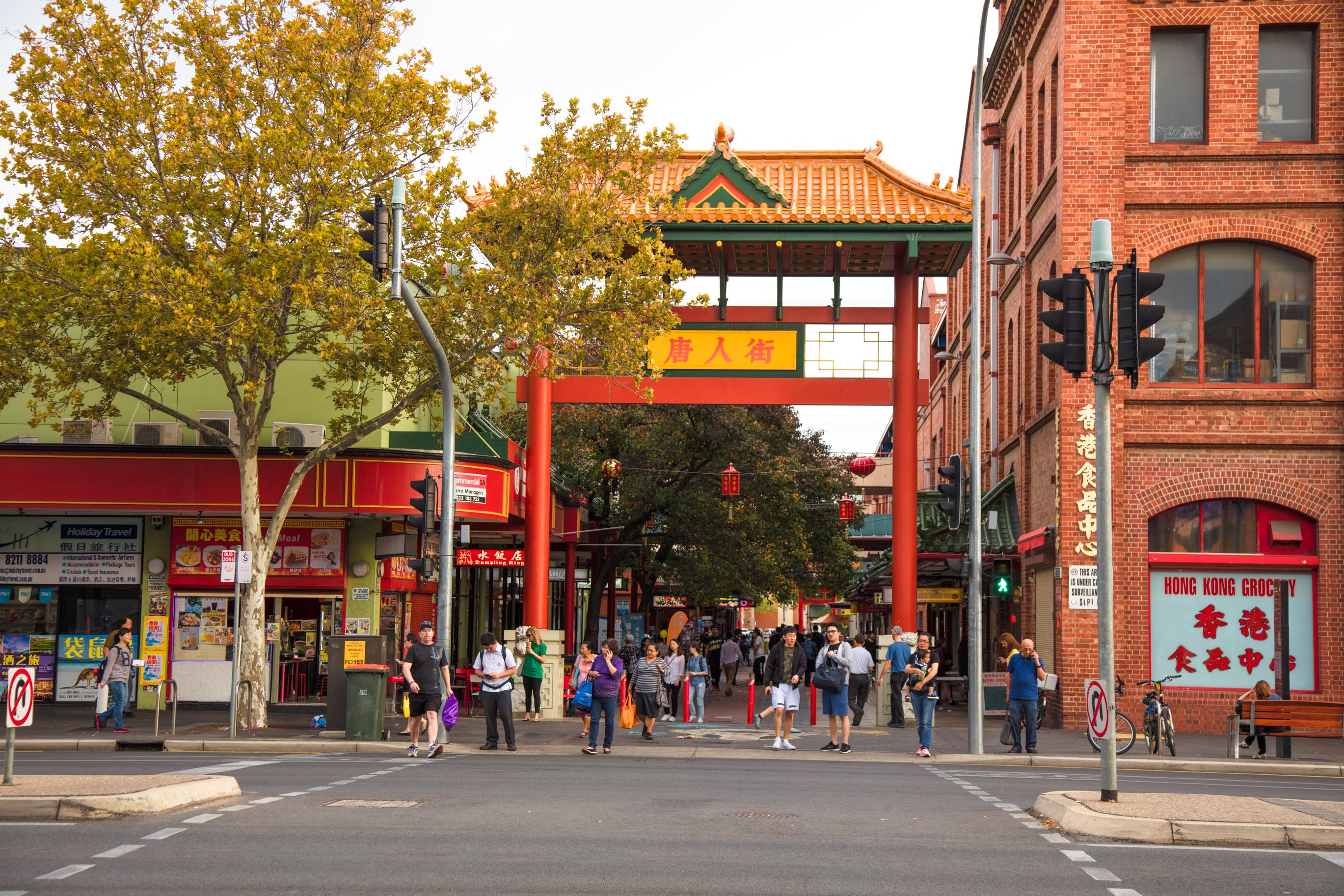
Chinatown in Adelaide.

Adelaide's Chinatown is located in the Adelaide Central Markets precinct, on Moonta Street, between Grote and Gouger streets. Two impressive Paifang mark the entrances at either end. Adelaide China Town consists mainly of oriental restaurants, grocery stores and markets.

== Northern Territory ==
=== Darwin ===
The first Chinatown in Darwin existed in the 1880s. A new synthetic Chinatown of Darwin, Northern Territory is in development and it is to be finished in 2010 at a cost of A$90 million.

== Western Australia ==
=== Broome ===
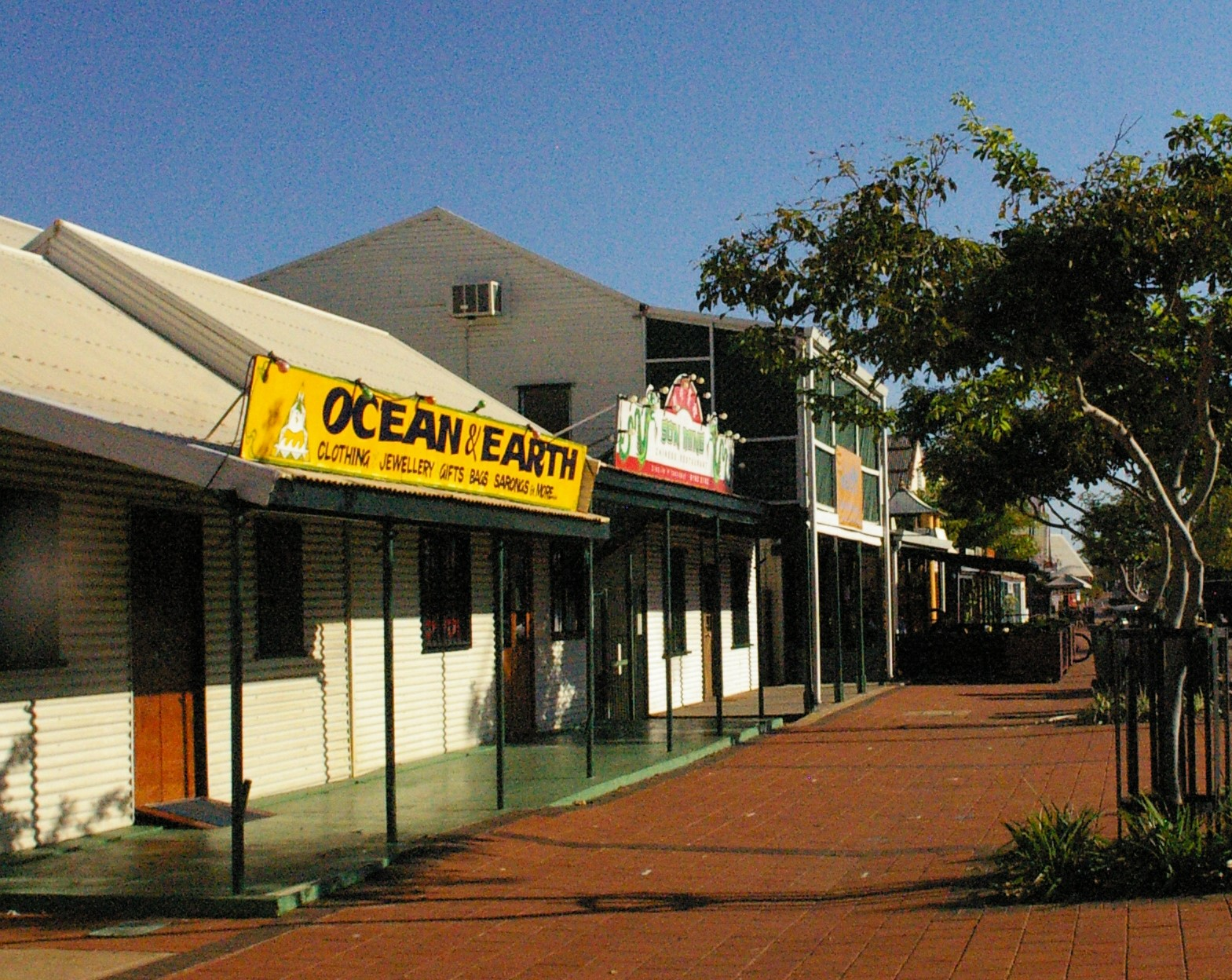
View north along the west side of Chinatown, Broome. Some buildings date back prior to 1900.

After Broome was established, a Chinatown area emerged as the town became home to a large Asian population in the late 19th century.

=== Perth ===
Perth has a Chinatown on Roe Street in the inner-city suburb of Northbridge. There are many more Asian businesses found on William Street, Northbridge than at the official Chinatown. Historically many Chinese (usually of Malaysian, Singaporean or Indonesian background) settled in Northbridge alongside other immigrant groups. The city's low density population and comparatively cheap property encourages migrants to move to the expanding suburbs. Asian students often chose to live in suburbs near universities, such as Bentley, Murdoch and Nedlands.
