= Bendigo Easter Festival =

Australian fair

The Bendigo Easter Festival, also known as the Bendigo Easter Fair, is an annual event held in Bendigo, Victoria, Australia, since 1871 with the exception of 2020 and 2021 due to the COVID-19 pandemic. The festival includes the Easter procession which sees Dai Gum Loong, the world's longest imperial dragon, dance through the streets along with An extensive program of activities and attractions such as an Easter Egg hunt.

== First fair ==
On 1 January 1871 discussion was held at the Shamrock Hotel regarding a fundraiser for the Bendigo Hospital and Benevolent Asylum. Representatives from the hospital, asylum and various friendly societies such as the St. Andrews Society, the Irish Australian Society, the Independent Order of Oddfellows Manchester Unity (MUIOOF), and Independent Order of Rechabites were in attendance. At the time Bendigo was known as the Borough of Sandhurst. Mr. William Heffernan, licensee of the hotel, suggested a fair based loosely on the Donnybrook Fair of Dublin, Ireland which ran from 1204 until about 1868. He also offered the use of a room for meetings and £10 to kick off the fundraising effort. Heffernan and his business partner Mr. Hadley had previously established and run an Easter sports carnival in 1869 and 1870 known as the Sandhurst Easter Holiday Sports. The Easter Fair was initially known by several names, but by 1880 it was generally referred to as the Bendigo Easter Fair. The first Easter Fair was held on 10–11 April 1871. Originally it was held at the lower end of Pall Mall around the current site of the Conservatory Gardens and lower Rosalind Park, later moving to the old showgrounds, now the Tom Flood Sports Centre. The first Easter Fair raised £2560 (£1280 for each institution) through admissions fees. In its first 21 years the event raised £23,000 for the hospital and asylum (some $3 million dollars in 2020).

=== Easter Parade 1871 ===
==== Procession ====
The first parade assembled at Market Square. It then moved to the railway station to receive the governor, proceeded down Mitchell Street, along Pall Mall to Mundy Street, up Mundy Street to Hargreaves Street, along to Williamson Street and dispersed at the Shamrock Hotel.

The first procession featured the following:

- Grand Marshall, Mr. John Stewart Esq.
- Governor of Victoria, John Manners-Sutton
- Mayor and councillors of Sandhurst and Eaglehawk
- Members of the mining, shire, and roads boards and hospital and asylum committees
- Societies such as the St. Andrews Society, Irish Australian Society, Deutscher Verein (German Society), Rechabites, MUIOOF, and Grand United Order of Oddfellows (GUOOF)
- Cavalry
- Fire brigade
- Music — bands and pipers

The Easter Fair Society

The Easter Fair Committee was initially elected annually at community meetings. The results were published after each Easter, following which the committee stood down and a new committee was elected the next year, often chaired by the mayor. In 1926 a permanent body to be known as the Bendigo Easter Fair Society was established. It was to be made up of 18 executive members — 3 representatives of the city of Bendigo, including the mayor, 2 from the borough of Eaglehawk, 2 from the benevolent asylum, 2 from the hospital and 9 from the community elected at the annual general meeting. It was also decided that the funds raised would be distributed 60% to the hospital and 40% to the asylum. The society was later to become a company in 1966 and an incorporated association in 1984. The society had ultimate control of the fair's operations until 2003 when insurance costs made it financially nonviable to continue. The committee was to remain as the core of a section 86 committee of council to direct the event's content and policy whilst council staff were to implement the practical aspects. The executive of the society still sits on the community consultative committee/reference group, an advisory body to council in the running of the fair. The Easter Fair Society, a volunteer group, still maintains its role as custodian and continues to operate elements of the fair. It was a major sponsor of the 150th Easter Fair in conjunction with its own group of sponsors and supporters, providing over $100,000 to the 150th anniversary event in 2020, which ended up being postponed due to the COVID-19 pandemic.

In the 1980s, the charitable nature of the festival was discontinued in favour of a focus on tourism. Many community groups such as the Rotary Club and Vision Australia still use the event as an opportunity to raise funds.

== Events ==
=== Easter procession ===
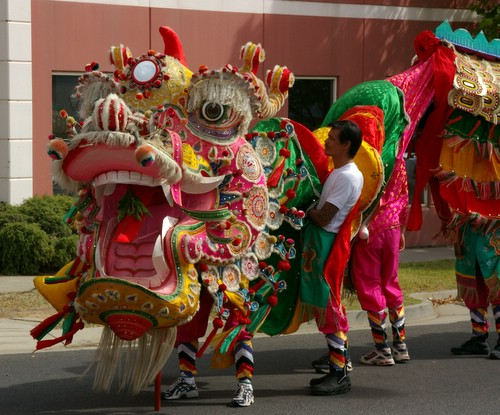
Sun Loong, the world's longest imperial dragon and a major drawcard of the procession

In 1893 The Weekly Advertiser described a procession which included a large and colourful Chinese section that delighted crowds. Since that time, the Chinese community has been an integral part of the festival. The procession features upwards of 100 floats entered by local community groups, schools, emergency services and businesses. The procession traditionally ends with the large Chinese section, which has grown to showcase over one thousand elements and participants. Chinese cultural groups from Bendigo and Melbourne participate in the parade, demonstrating lion and dragon dances. Traditionally the procession was held on Easter Monday, but since 2011, when it clashed with Anzac Day, it has been held on Easter Sunday. A team of radio-equipped marshals was established in 1978 for the purpose of improving entry movements and reducing parade gaps. By the early 1990s, it had evolved into a separate, incorporated entity known as the Dragon City Marshals Inc. (DCMs), with a much wider geographical sphere of activity. By 1994 DCMs were assisting many other events around Victoria, including Melbourne's Moomba Festival.

=== Dragons ===
In 1892, large processional dragons became an integral part of the annual parade. The three principal golden dragons are Loong (1892–1970), Sun Loong (1970–2019) and Dai Gum Loong (2019–present), housed at the Golden Dragon Museum in Bendigo.

=== Torchlight procession ===
The torchlight procession is a nighttime parade which began before 1900. It features local emergency services, with local volunteer and professional fire brigade members marching with flaming brass torches. In recent times the parade has ended at Lake Weeroona where entertainment, activities and fireworks have been held. The torchlight procession is held on Easter Saturday each year.

=== "Popular Girl" ===
A fundraising event called the Popular Girl was held from 1930 to 1996 in which well-known local young ladies raised money for charity. The woman who raised the largest amount of money was crowned as Miss Popular Girl. The competition is no longer held. The 2010 parade contained a section in which a number of past Popular Girls paraded once again. The Popular Girl contest was preceded by the Queens' competition from about 1916 to 1929. The winner was selected by receiving the most votes which translated to funds raised for their respective charities. It included Queen of ANZAC, Queen of Victory, Queen of Eaglehawk, Queen of Red Cross, etc.

=== Carnival ===
Originally held in several locations, including Rosalind Park, Bendigo Showgrounds and, more recently the Bendigo Central Business District, the carnival features a large number of sideshow alley attractions and children's rides.

=== Chinese Spring Festival ===
The Chinese Spring Festival has been held every Easter Sunday in the Yi Yuan Gardens since 1996. It includes many cultural performers who demonstrate martial arts, lion dancing, storytelling and traditional Chinese dancing which includes the fan dance, ribbon dance and drum dance.

=== Awakening of the Dragon ===
In this ceremony unique to Bendigo, the Southern Lions perform, accompanied by cymbals and drums, in order to awaken the dragon who will then walk in the Gala Parade which culminates in the explosion of tens of thousands of firecrackers. The Chinese Association Lion Team perform the donation dance which is unique to Bendigo's Chinese community. The dance began as a way for the Chinese community to raise money for local hospitals and benevolent societies.

== New name ==
In order to be recognized as a major event, the Bendigo Easter Fair was renamed the Bendigo Easter Festival in 2003 when the City of Greater Bendigo assumed operational control. In 2020 the name was to return to Bendigo Easter Fair as a tribute to its 150th year; however, the event was cancelled due to the COVID-19 pandemic. Over 100,000 people typically attend the three-day event.
