= Russell Jack =

Australian museum founder (1935–2026)

Russell Goldfield Jack AM
- Born: 13 January 1935; Bendigo, Victoria, Australia
- Died: 11 August 2026 (aged 91)
- Known for: Founding the Golden Dragon Museum

Russell Goldfield Jack AM (Chinese: 雷揚名; 13 January 1935 – 11 August 2026) was an Australian museum founder, known for his work with the Bendigo Chinese Association. He is credited as the founder of the Golden Dragon Museum, opened in 1991.

== Background ==
Jack was born in Bendigo, Victoria, Australia on 13 January 1935. He was of Hong Kong Chinese and Chinese-Australian descent, and was son to herbalist Harry Louey Jack and Gladys May (Daisy) Ah Dore, the niece of prominent market gardener Samuel Ah Dore. He attended Long Gully Primary School and Bendigo Technical College.

He was a keen Australian rules footballer, representing both schools in interschool competitions. In 1949, he was selected to represent Bendigo in the Victorian Schoolboys Carnival and was awarded Best and Fairest. He also played a season of senior football for the Eaglehawk Football Club in 1952 - aged 17 - before retiring from the sport.

Jack went to work on the Victorian Railways as a boilermaker and also ran a Chinese restaurant.

On 18 October 1958, he married Margaret Joan Clarke, with whom he had two children, David and Anita Jack.

Jack died on 11 August 2026, at the age of 91.

== Awards and recognition ==
Jack received numerous awards for his work within the Bendigo Chinese community and with the Golden Dragon Museum.

In 1993, Jack was gazetted as a Member of the Order of Australia in the 1993 Queen's Birthday Honours list for preservation of Bendigo's Chinese heritage. He was named Victorian Senior Citizen of the Year in 1998.

Jack carried the Olympic torch through Bendigo for both the 1956 Melbourne Olympics and the 2000 Sydney Olympics.

In 2008, Jack received an Award for Meritorious Service in the Community, Victorian Awards for Excellence in Multicultural Affairs. He has been involved with the Bendigo Chinese Association for most of his life and served as president for 32 years.
