= Golden Dragon Museum =

- 金龙博物馆

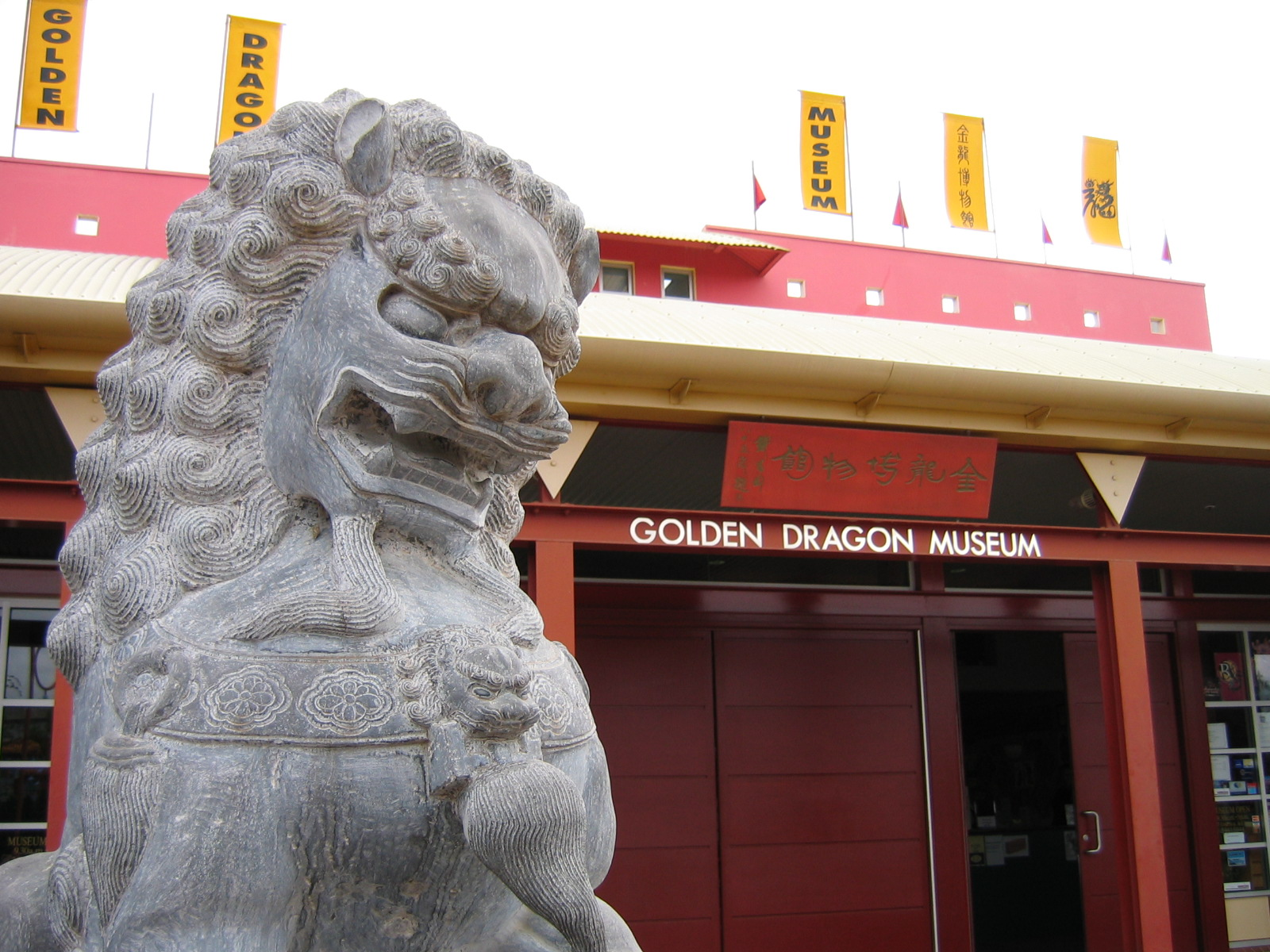
- Established: 1991
- Location: Dai Gum San 1-11 Bridge St, Bendigo, Victoria, Australia
- Coordinates: 36.7549°S 144.2822°E
- Type: History museum
- Director: Russell Jack
- Website: www.goldendragonmuseum.org

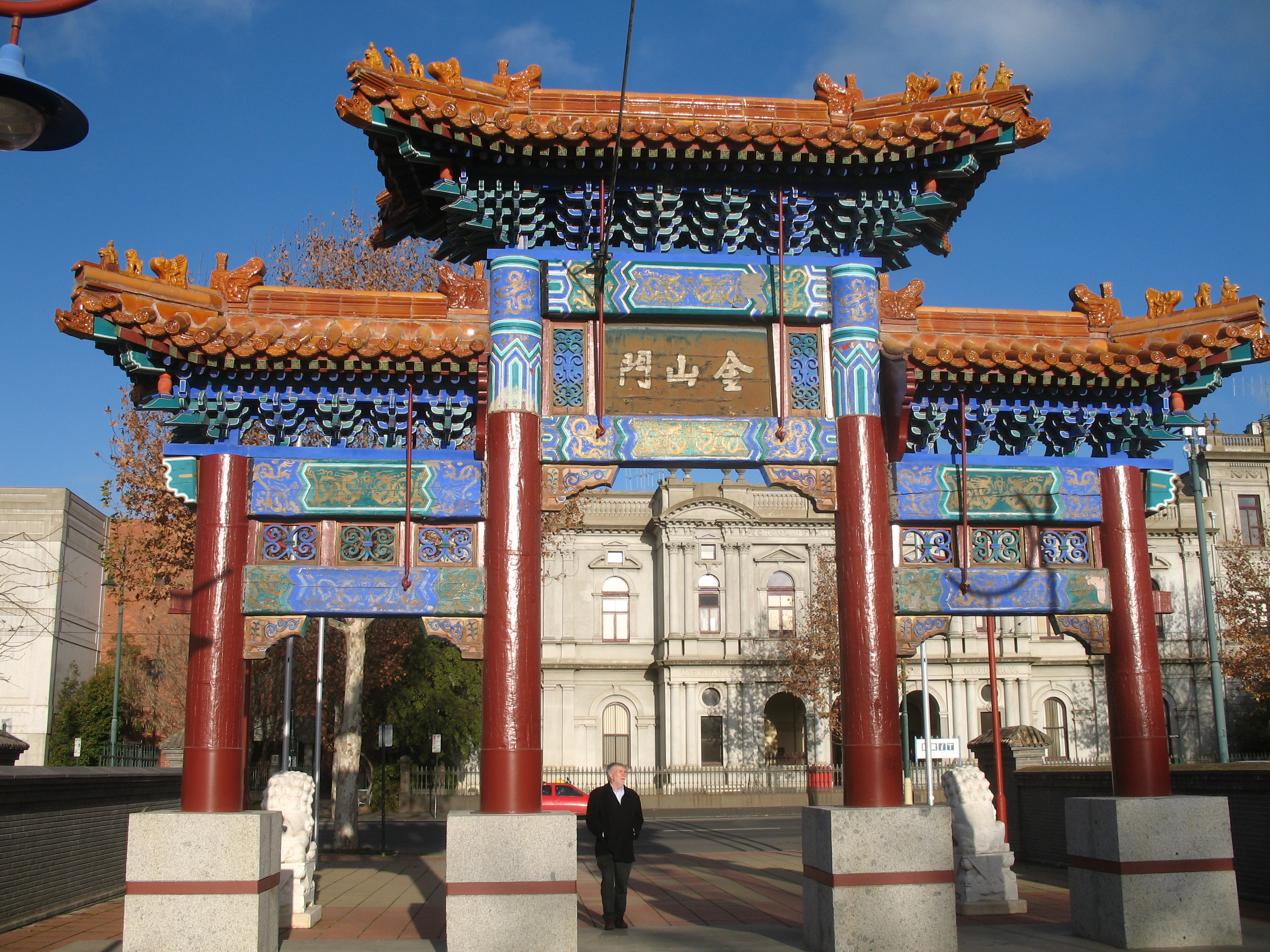
Gate of the museum

The Golden Dragon Museum (Chinese: 金龙博物馆) is a museum in the city of Bendigo, Victoria, Australia, dedicated to the culture and history of Chinese Australians, particularly in the region. Built on the historical site of one of Bendigo's Chinatowns, the museum's precinct also includes Chinese Gardens and a temple to Kuan Yin. Through the museum accreditation program, it was the first accredited museum in Victoria.

== History ==
The Golden Dragon Museum opened in 1991. The site of the museum is the area of one of Bendigo's Chinatowns. The Bridge Street Chinatown was the centre for Chinese activity in the region from the late 19th century to 1964. The old buildings of Chinatown were bulldozed by the city council to make room for a car park. In the 1980s, Russell Jack pushed forward his vision for a Chinese museum in the area. Once the funding was acquired, Harry Charalambous was chosen as the architect. His design incorporated Chinese symbolism and architecture with distinctly Australian materials such as corrugated iron and red brick reflecting the history of the Chinese of Bendigo.

Chinese heritage constitutes a significant part of the town of Bendigo's cultural identity. The Victorian gold rush saw thousands of Chinese migrate to Bendigo in the latter half of the 19th century. Most of these people were young men from the Guangdong province. They were seeking better economic opportunities for themselves and their families. Once they arrived in Bendigo, the Chinese formed their own community and began raising money for charities. In the 1870s, the local Chinese were invited to take part in the annual Easter festival. The Chinese elders of the region raised money to purchase extravagant costumes and regalia for the event. These costumes form the basis of the museum's collection and are well-preserved garments made from silk and gold bullion thread.

=== Origins of the name ===
In 1988, the Chinese year of the Golden Dragon, official fundraising for the museum by the Chinese of Bendigo began. The most significant artifact in the museum's collection was to be the processional dragon Loong (Chinese: 華人金龍; pinyin: Huárén jīnlóng; Jyutping: waa4 jan4 gam1 lung4; lit. 'The Chinese Golden Dragon').

== Collection ==
The Golden Dragon Museum was founded to protect, preserve and teach the history of the Chinese in Bendigo. It inherited the large and significant collection of Chinese processional regalia from the Bendigo Chinese Association. These formed the basis of the museum's collection. The collection has grown significantly since then with both small and large donations.

=== 1880s processional regalia collection ===
The basis for the museum's collection. This vast collection contains theatrical costumes made from materials including silk, furs and gold bullion thread. These pieces were once used in Bendigo's Easter Parade. The Chinese of Bendigo had a long history of parades and celebrations in their camps on the goldfields. These were usually for Chinese New Year or other Chinese cultural events. Later in the 1870s when the Easter Parade became an annual institution in Bendigo, the Chinese joined. The Chinese section of the parade soon became one of the parade's most elaborate sections. In these early performances the Chinese used regalia they had made in Australia or brought with them from China.

In 1880 the Chinese community leaders in Bendigo decided to place a levy on all Chinese in the region to buy items for use in the Easter Parade. Through this levy £750 was raised. It was sent to China and used to acquire a number of crates full of richly embroidered theatrical costumes. There were enough costumes to fit hundreds of players into a theatrical Chinese court, with scholars, generals, soldiers, princesses and an emperor. Some positions within the parade became highly sought after. The Chinese of the region would bid for the honour of wearing certain costumes. All the money would go to local charities. Much of this collection remains today.

=== Dragons ===
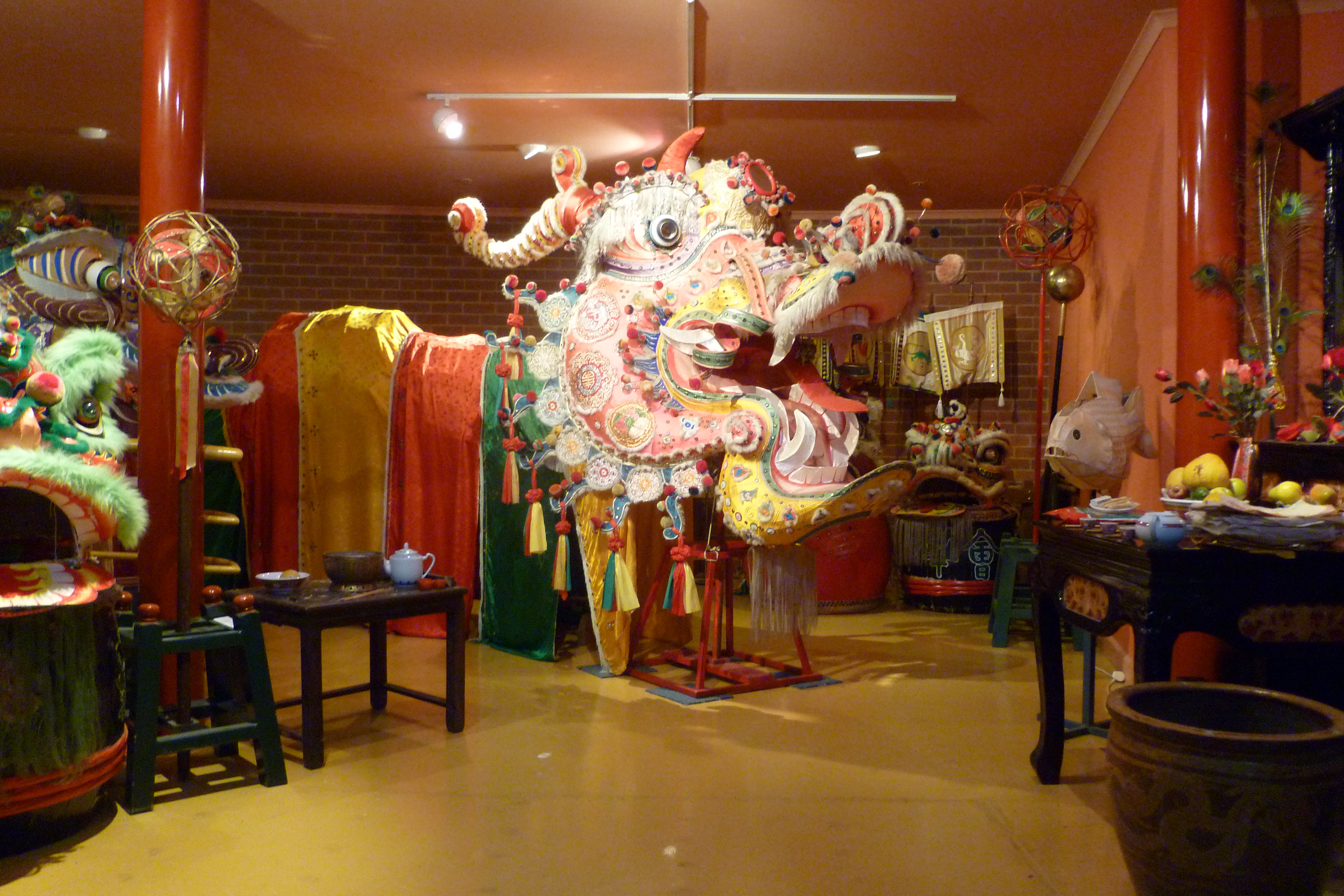
Sun Loong on display

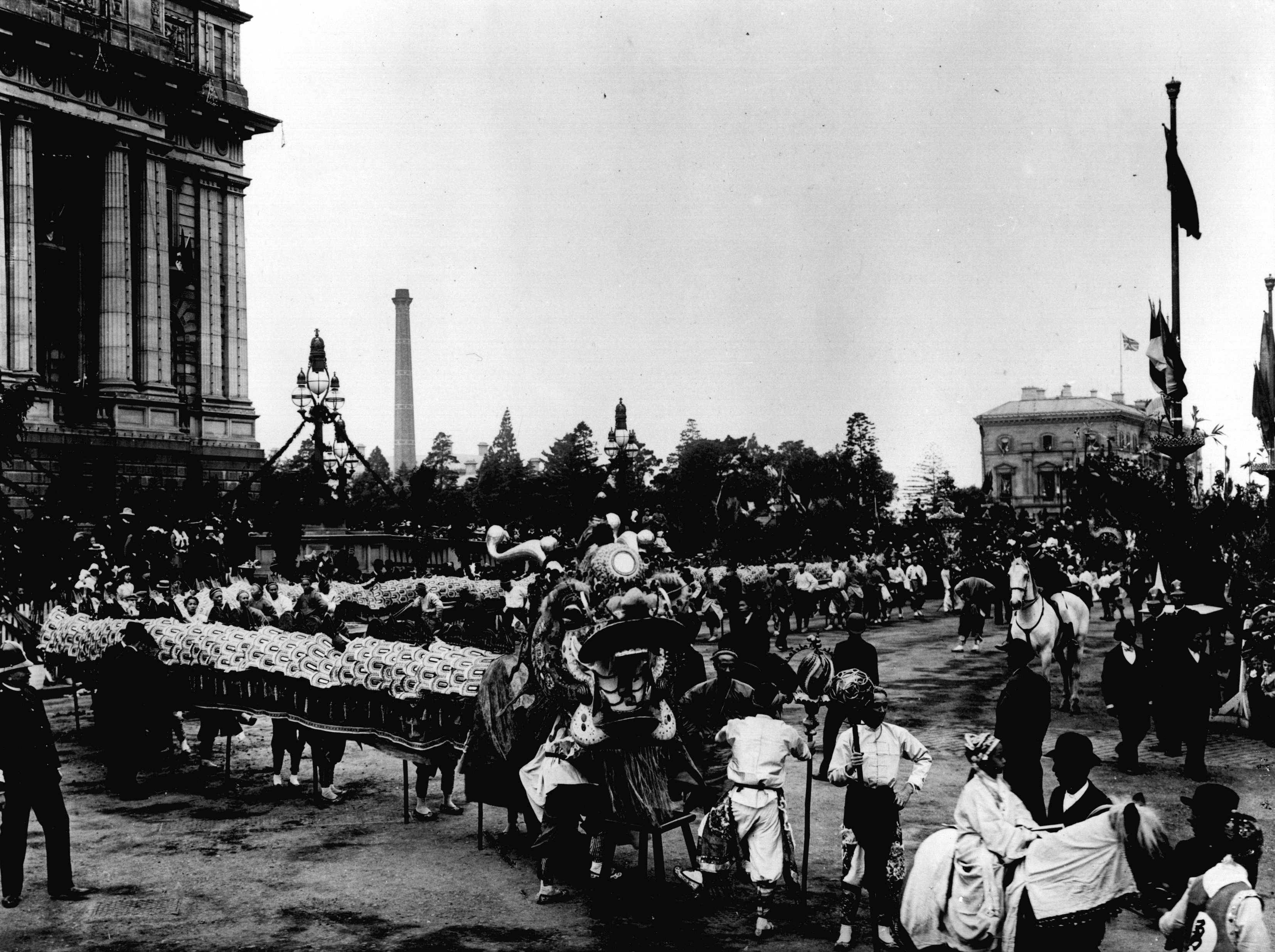
Loong dancing in celebration of the federation of Australia in 1901

The Golden Dragon Museum houses what are believed to be the oldest and the longest imperial dragons in the world. Sun Loong, the longest imperial dragon, is over 100 metres (330 ft) long and was brought out every year for the Bendigo Easter Festival until Sun Loong was retired in favor of the 125 m (410 ft) long Dai Gum Loong in 2019. Loong, the oldest imperial dragon, is heritage listed. Loong is an important part of Australian history thanks to his presence at the parades for Federation in 1901 and the Centenary of Federation in 2001. The museum also contains other dragons which all still perform today.

=== John St Alban Collection ===
In 2001, John St Alban, a private collector from Adelaide began donating pieces of his collection to the museum. Acquired from Chinese dealers in the 20th century this collection contains lavish furniture and adornments from palaces and temples of the late Qing dynasty. Such large pieces are rarely seen on public display in collections outside of China. These include screens, thrones and chairs made of Huanghuali wood. Many ornate silver, cloisonné and bronze incense burners. Jade carvings have been inlaid on both the wooden pieces and elsewhere throughout the collection, as well as some Jade pieces which stand on their own. There are also cloisonné bronze and marble statues of guardians and religious icons. Porcelain items were also donated. One dish has been dated back to the Song dynasty.

=== Dai Gum San Wax Works collection ===
The Dai Gum San Wax Works in Bendigo closed down in the late 1980s. It contained a range of wax Chinese figures including a likeness of Sun Yat-sen. All these figures were given into the care of the Bendigo Chinese Association and when the Golden Dragon Museum opened they were an important part of the displays. These wax figures were made in Hong Kong by Vivian Sun. They arrived in Bendigo in 1973.

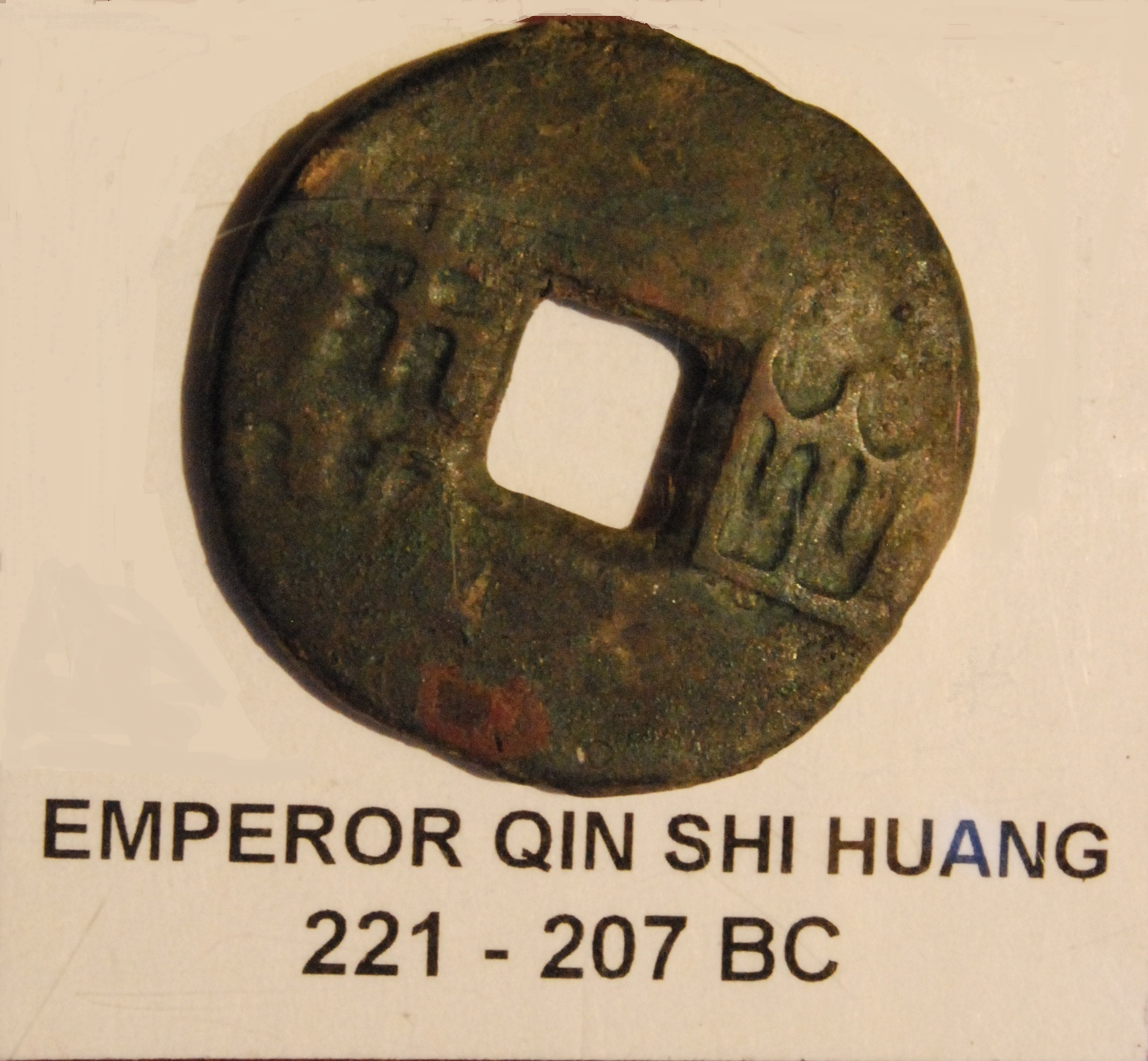
Qin dynasty era coin from the Golden Dragon Museum

=== Horrie Bridges collection ===
Horrie Bridges was a local Bendigo man with a passion for collecting foreign currency. Over many years and several trips to China he amassed a comprehensive collection of Chinese currency. He donated this to the museum in 1991. The collection contains several Zhou dynasty era pieces of knife money. The earliest round coins in the collection are two Qin dynasty ones. From there the collection of ancient Chinese coinage is vast and comprehensive. Bridges also collected paper money. All of the paper items are from the 20th century. There are notes from the Republic of China era, 1912–1949, there are notes from the People's Republic as well as some rare notes from Manchukuo. This collection is believed to be the largest collection of Chinese currency on display anywhere in Australia.

== Education ==
The Golden Dragon Museum hosts tour groups from schools throughout Australia. It contains several displays which portray the success and value of multiculturalism. The museum also contains displays which show the hardships and racism many Chinese faced because of the White Australia policy at the beginning of the 20th century. Alongside these specific displays the assorted Chinese artifacts are great examples of Chinese culture and history.

The Golden Dragon Museum also offers educational craft workshops to tour groups and it also offers its expertise to other community museums around Australia. In 2013 the museum began running night time Chinese language classes.
