= Luoshan dragon =

Type of dragon dance

Luoshan Dragon is a traditional dragon dance of the Lishui District and Fengzhen Luoshan Village, Nanjing, China. Recognized as an item of intangible cultural heritage in Nanjing and a significant local folk cultural activity, it boasts a history spanning over 400 years.

== Performance ==
The Luoshan Dragon performance typically takes place over a twenty-five-day period, running from the 24th day of the twelfth lunar month to the 18th day of the first lunar month of the following year. The dance is performed on the shores of Shijiu Lake, near Luoshan Village. The entire program is broadly divided into three stages: the drafting (commencement), the consecration of the White Dragon, and the dragon dance performance itself. The drafting marks the start of the event; performers line up in order before the Dragon Association gate and begin the dance, led by the sound of three cannon blasts and four large red lanterns. At least one person from every household in the village participates, bringing the total number of performers to over 500; the group includes not only young and middle-aged adults but also children aged 8 to 12. The dragon dance consists of three segments: "Playing with the Pearl" (guiding the dragon's head), "Dragon Leaping" (performers alternating in two teams), and "Cloud Leaping" (performers holding cloth strips inscribed with characters while circling the dragon's body).

== Craftsmanship ==
The construction of the Luoshan Dragon involves key steps such as assembling the dragon's skeletal frame, papering, and painting. The dragon's head stands 2.3 meters high and 2.2 meters wide; the body comprises 24 sections, each 2.8 meters long, resulting in a total length of nearly 100 meters. The assembly of the dragon is completed by the 24th day of the twelfth lunar month. Additionally, accessories such as dragon flags, colorful banners, large lanterns, and horseshoe cannons must be crafted. A second major category of production involves cloud discs and embroidery. There are 66 cloud discs in total; they are constructed with bamboo frames and wax paper, featuring painted cloud patterns. The colorful embroidery work encompasses headpieces, ceremonial costumes, and other embroidered items.
