= Sun Loong =

Chinese parade dragon in Bendigo, Victoria, Australia

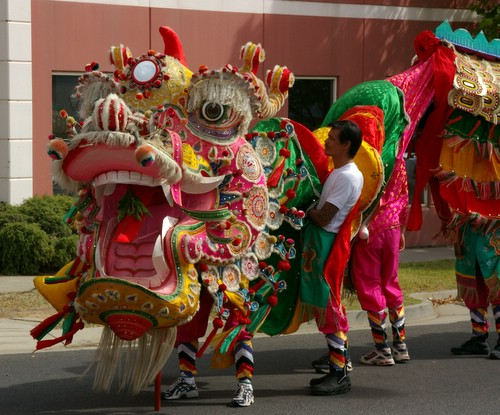
- Sun Loong, formerly the world's longest imperial dragon
- Species: dragon
- Breed: imperial parade
- Hatched: 新龍; 1970; Hong Kong
- Years active: 1970–2019
- Predecessor: Loong
- Successor: Dai Gum Loong
- Residence: Golden Dragon Museum, Bendigo, Australia
- Height: 100 m (330 ft)

Sun Loong (simplified Chinese: 新龙; traditional Chinese: 新龍; pinyin: xīn lóng; Jyutping: san1 lung4; lit. 'New Dragon'), derived from the Cantonese pronunciation of "New Dragon", is an imperial parade dragon that was used in the Bendigo Easter parade from 1970 through 2019. It was believed to be the longest imperial parade dragon in the world, measuring approximately 100 metres (330 ft) long.

Sun Loong was used in the traditional Chinese dragon dance and superseded Bendigo's earlier Loong in 1970; Loong is heritage listed as it is believed to be the oldest complete imperial parade dragon in the world. On 21 April 2019, a new dragon named Dai Gum Loong made its debut at the Bendigo parade and took over the title of longest dragon at 125 m (410 ft). Both Loong and Sun Loong are on permanent display at the Golden Dragon Museum in Bendigo.

== Origins ==
Dragons are an important part of Chinese culture. Large processional dragons have been used in Chinese festivals for over a thousand years. After Chinese came to Bendigo in the 1850s for the gold rush many settled and later, in the 1870s, the Chinese community began to participate in the annual Bendigo Easter Festival. In this parade the local Chinese brought their old dragon dancing traditions to Bendigo. The earliest documented appearance of the venerable dragon Loong, approximately 60 m (200 ft) long, was in 1901; although a local newspaper printed photographs of a dragon in the parade in 1892, Golden Dragon Museum officers believe this was not Loong. Loong was built in Foshan, China at the Sing Cheng workshop, which also built parade dragons for Los Angeles and Ballarat.

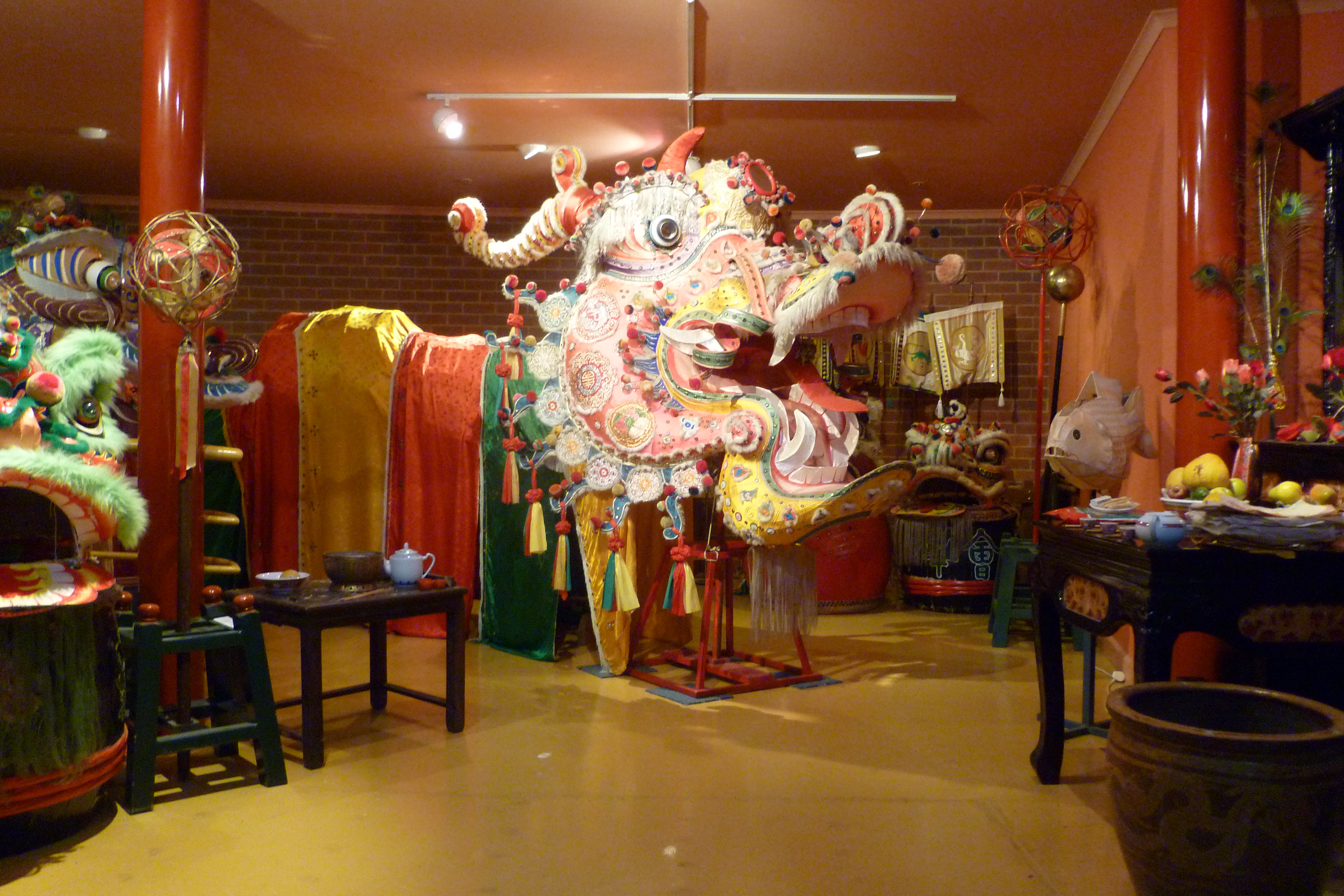
Sun Loong on display at the Golden Dragon Museum

Grand processional dragons became a big part of the Easter Parade. By the late 1960s, the 1901 dragon Loong was getting older and an effort to raise money for a new dragon began. The Loong 100, a coalition of local Bendigo businessmen, politicians, and the Bendigo Chinese Association, were instrumental in raising the money for the purchase of Sun Loong. A traditional dragon maker was found in Hong Kong, the Lo On Kee (羅安記) owned by a man named Lo On (羅安). After Sun Loong was completed, it was greeted by and assumed the duties of Loong at the 1970 Easter Parade; at the time, Sun Loong was the longest imperial dragon in the world.

Sun Loong paraded before Prince Charles and Princess Diana during their royal visit to Australia in 1983. By 2009, planning for a successor to Sun Loong began; a vendor was selected in May 2018, and Dai Gum Loong was built between June 2018 and February 2019. After being blessed at Fuk Tak Temple in Shau Kei Wan, Dai Gum Loong traveled to Bendigo and made his debut at the Easter parade on April 21, 2019, greeted by the 1901 Loong and peacefully assuming the duties from the 1970 Sun Loong; all three dragons returned to their home in the Golden Dragon Museum, led by Loong. Dai Gum Loong is billed as 125 m (410 ft) long. Ringo Leung was selected to restore Sun Loong.

== Size ==
Sun Loong was originally over 60 m (200 ft) long. Bendigo was very proud of the fact he was the longest imperial dragon in the Southern Hemisphere. However, in 1980, the Chinese community in Melbourne purchased Dai Loong, a processional dragon they intended to be a metre or so longer than Sun Loong. In response, Bendigo ordered an extension for Sun Loong. Following its inclusion, the dragon's official length has remained a secret. However, its approximate length is now 100 m (330 ft)

Sun Loong has 6,000 silk and papier-mâché scales, and 90,000 hand-cut mirrors. James Lew, a 101-year-old Chinese elder, brought Sun Loong to life in 1970 by dotting his eyes with chicken blood.
