= St Peter Julian's Church =

St Peter Julian’s Church
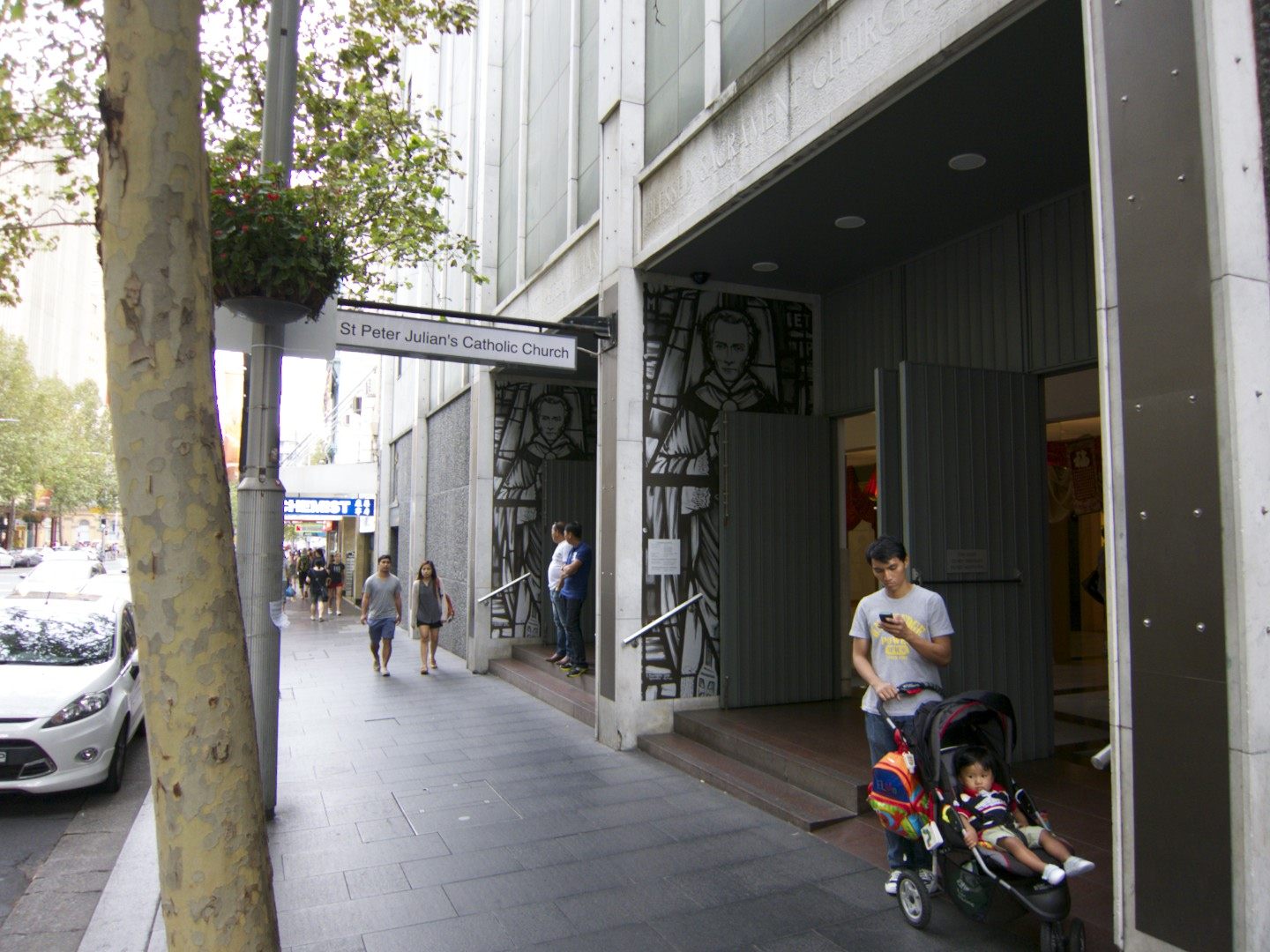
- The exterior of St Peter Julian's Church, in Haymarket

- Location of St Peter Julian's Church in the Sydney central business district
- 33°52′43″S 151°12′19″E
- Location: 641 George Street, Haymarket, Sydney, New South Wales
- Country: Australia
- Denomination: Catholic
- Religious order: Congregation of the Blessed Sacrament
- Website: stpeterjuliansydney.com

History
- Status: Active
- Dedication: St Peter Julian Eymard
- Dedicated: 1964

Architecture
- Functional status: Church

Administration
- Archdiocese: Sydney
- Deanery: City
- Parish: St Mary's Cathedral

St Peter Julian's Church is a Roman Catholic church and shrine of eucharistic adoration in Sydney in the care of the Congregation of the Blessed Sacrament.

The church is located at 641 George Street, Haymarket, in the heart of Chinatown. Designed by Terence Daly, it was completed in early 1964. It is named after the congregation's founder, St Peter Julian Eymard, who was canonised in 1962.

A religious community of priests and brothers (currently under the leadership of Fr Iggy Tuan Vu, SSS]) live in the monastery attached to St Peter Julian's Church.

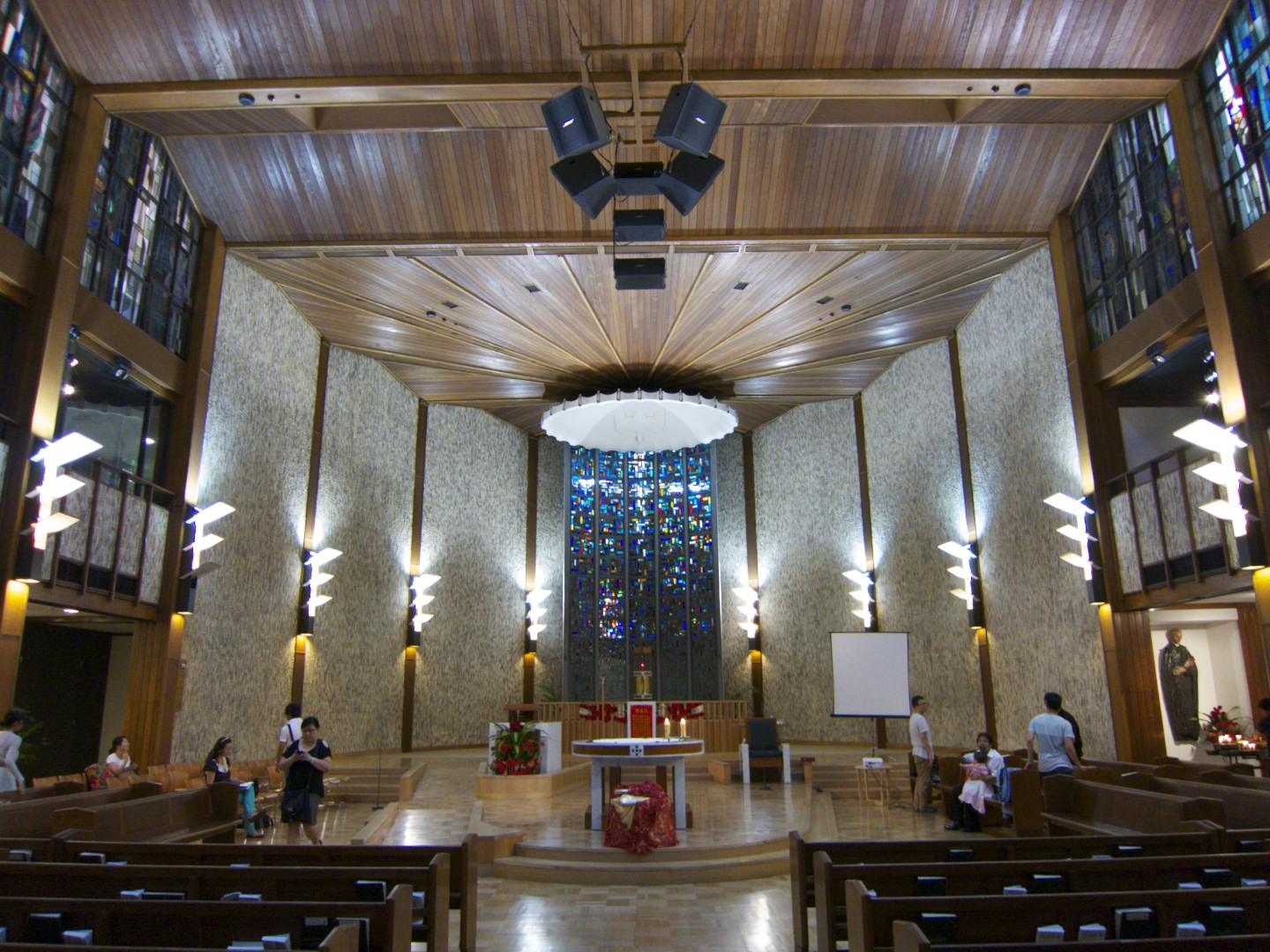
St Peter Julian's Church, Sydney - Interior

== History ==
The Congregation of the Blessed Sacrament arrived in Australia in 1929 to assume pastoral care of St Francis' Church, Melbourne, creating a eucharistic shrine there. Seeking to establish a similar shrine in Sydney, they acquired land in 1952 and built a monastery and city chapel, originally named the Church of the Blessed Sacrament, opened by Cardinal Gilroy on 30 August 1953. The community grew rapidly, necessitating the construction of a new monastery in 1963 and a new church in 1964. Both underwent a major refurbishment and modernisation in 2008–09 after World Youth Day.

== See also ==
- Catholic Church in Australia
