= Pall Mall (Bendigo) =

Street in Victoria, Australia

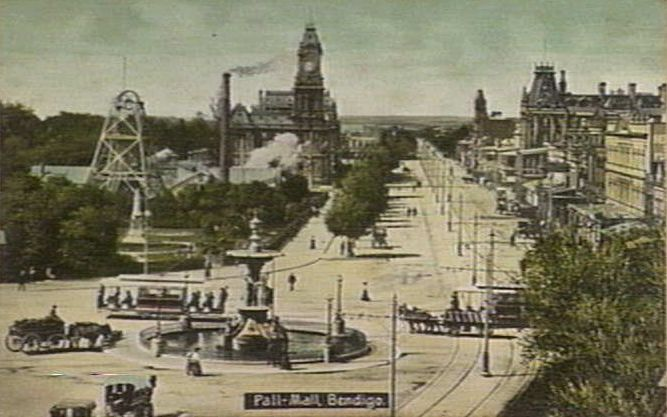
Pall Mall, Bendigo in 1909 with the Alexandra Fountain at Charing Cross in the foreground.

Pall Mall /ˌpæl ˈmæl/ is a major thoroughfare in the centre of Bendigo, Victoria, Australia. It is one of the main streets of the Bendigo central business district and connects the Charing Cross intersection to the south-west with McCrae Street to the north-east at Howard Place, opposite Mundy Street. Pall Mall also forms a 500-metre section of the Midland Highway, one of Bendigo's main thoroughfares.

Since the 1860s, Pall Mall has been regarded as "one of the most charming thoroughfares in Australia" and the collection of Victorian-era buildings in the Second Empire architectural style, gardens and statuary on either side of the wide tree-lined streetscape is unparalleled in regional Victoria.

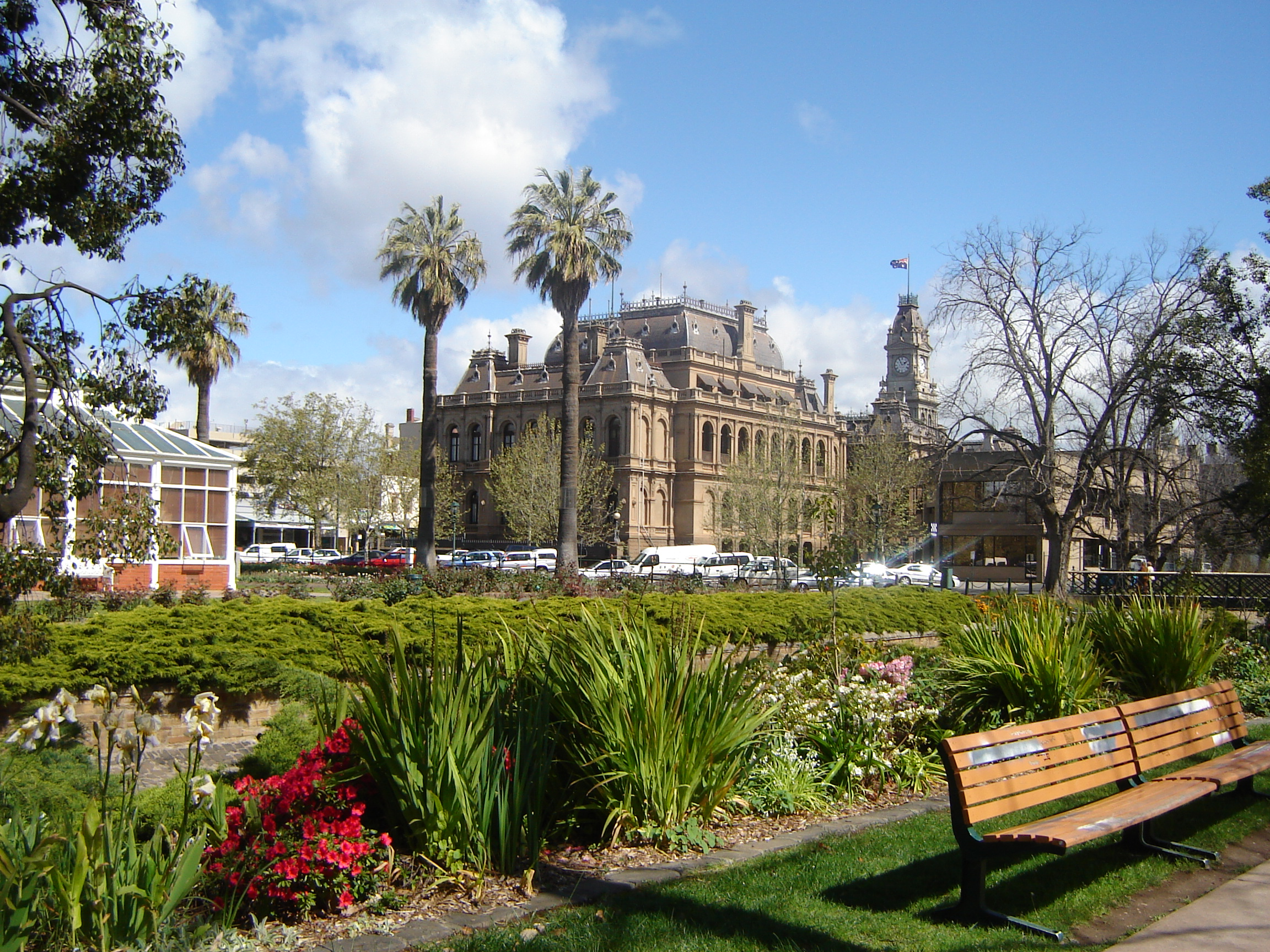
The Old Bendigo Law Courts and Pall Mall from Rosalind Park

== Etymology ==
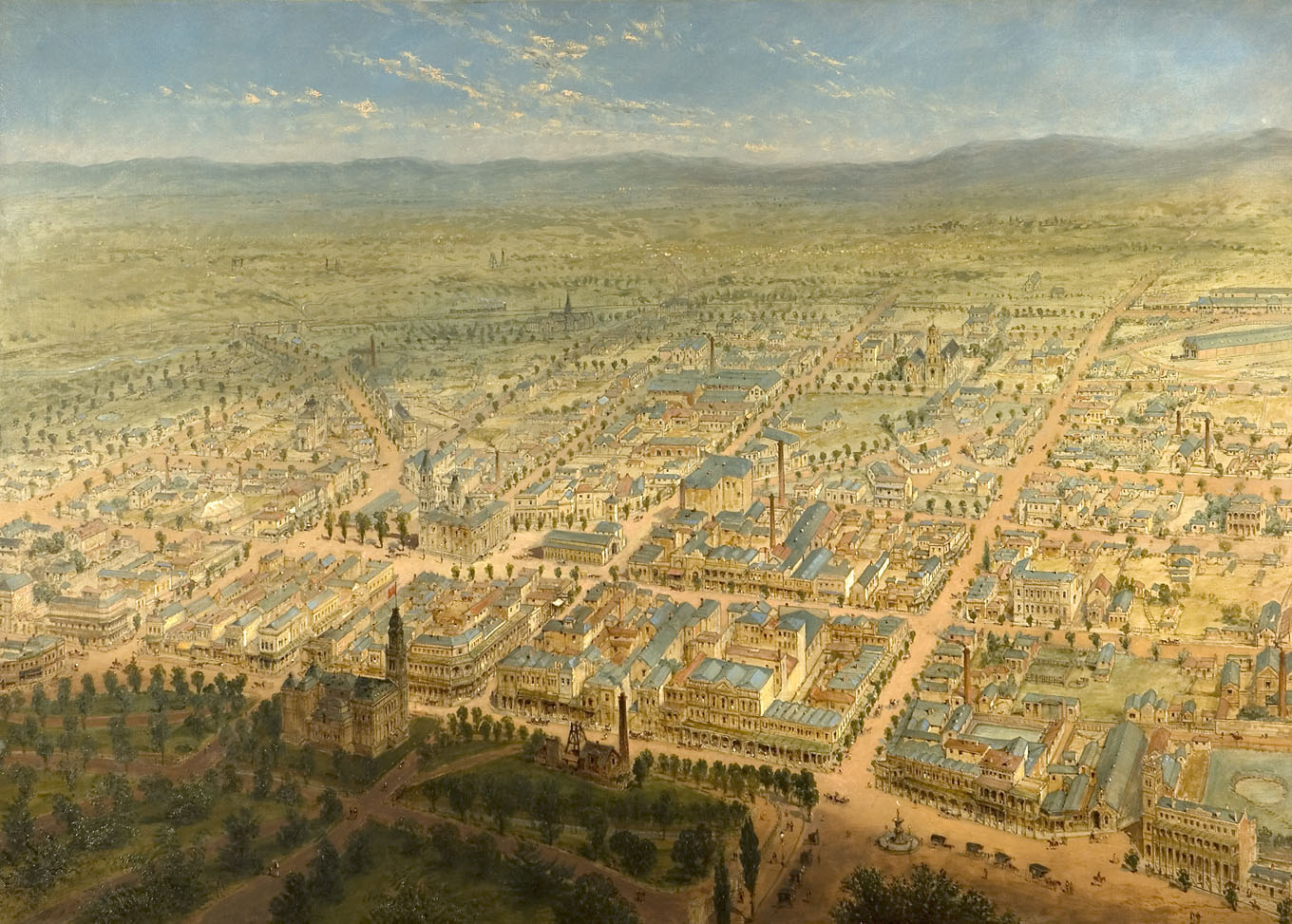
Bendigo from Camp Hill in 1884. Pall Mall and the Charing Cross junction are clearly visible running from left to right at the bottom of the painting

Pall Mall in Bendigo is named after Pall Mall in London, England: a street known for its shops and architecturally important buildings. Like its English namesake, Pall Mall in Bendigo is also in the immediate vicinity of the Charing Cross intersection.

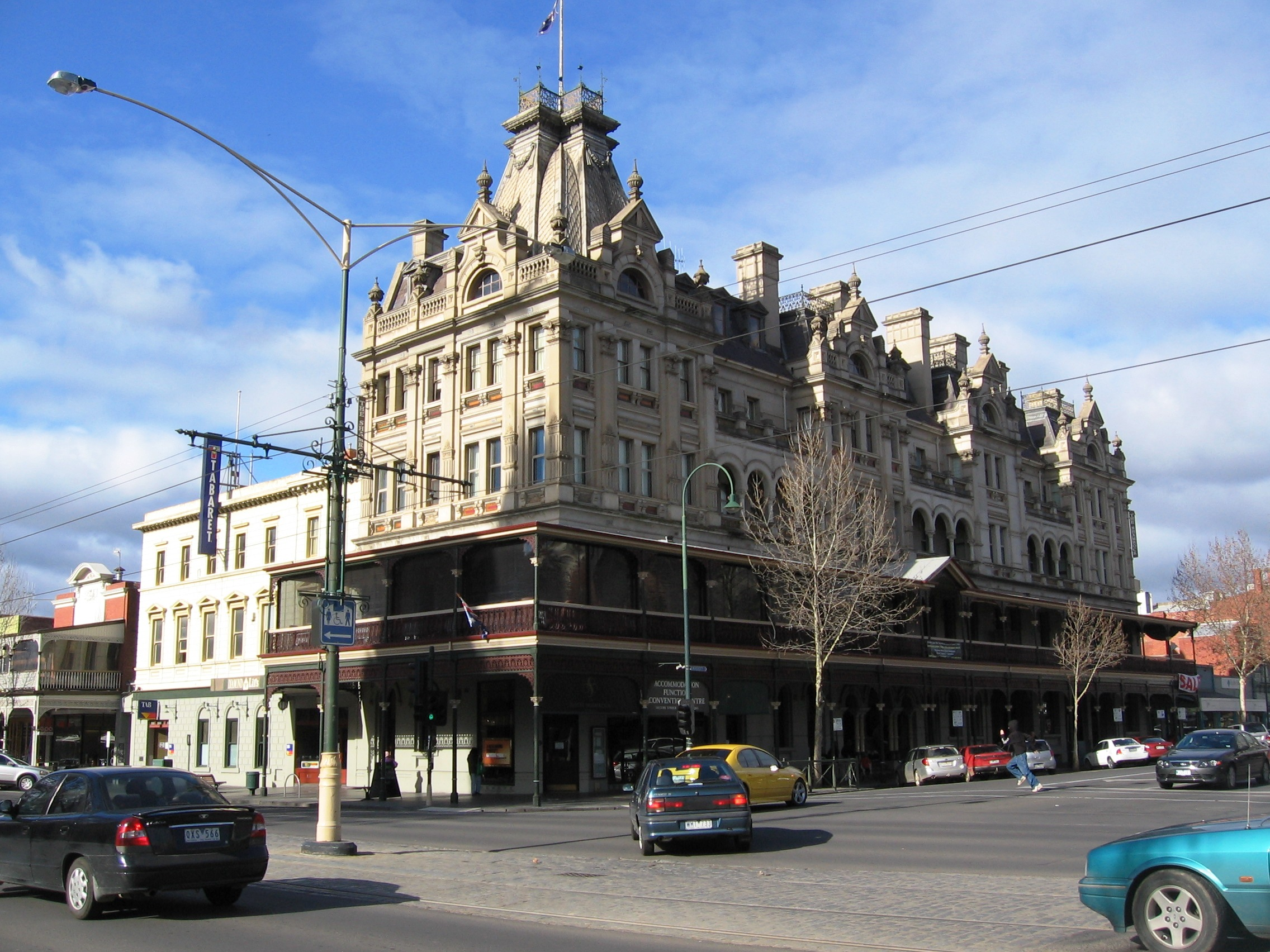
Shamrock Hotel on Pall Mall

== Geography ==
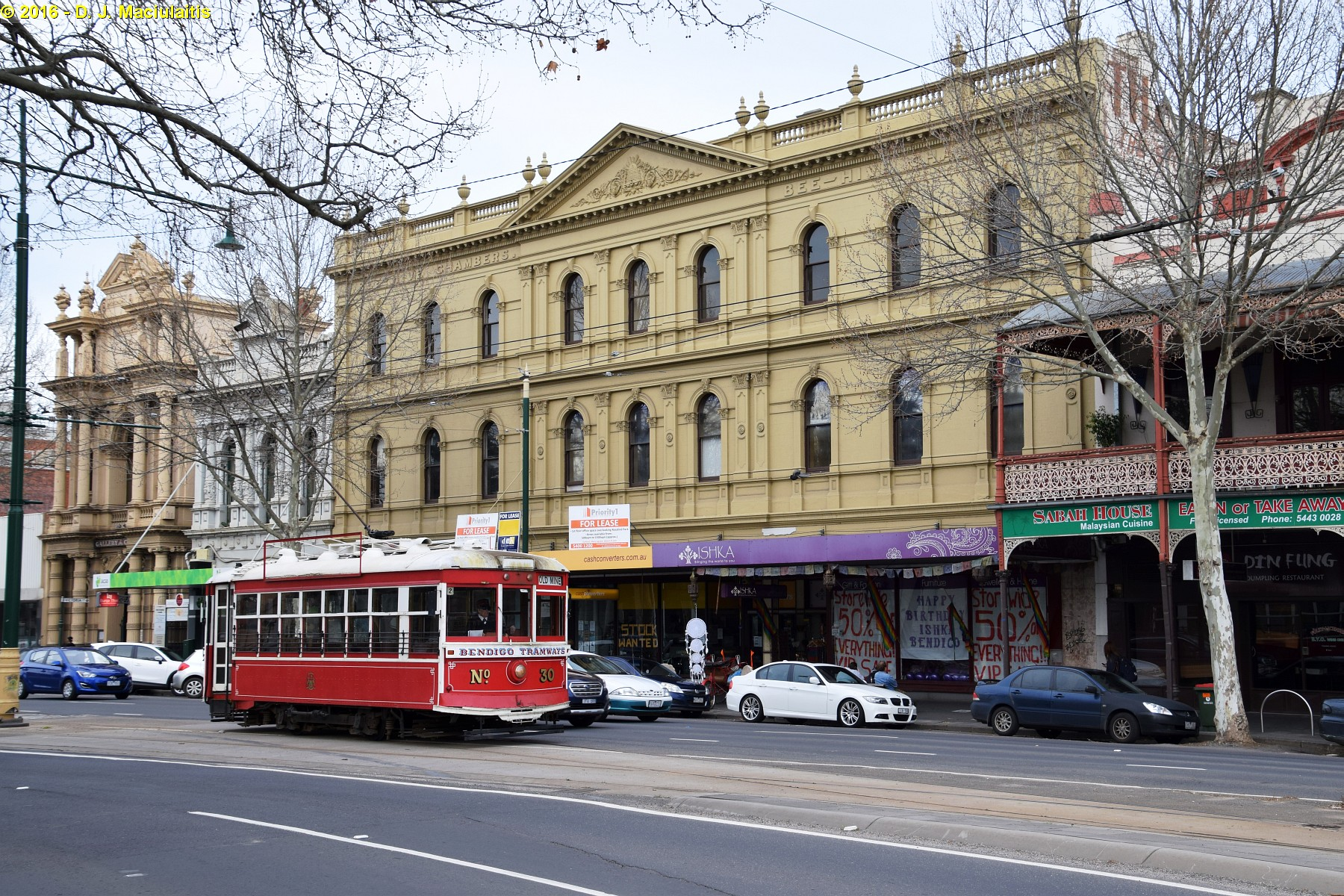
Tram on Pall Mall

The street is around 500 metres long - only 140 metres shorter than its London namesake. It runs in a north-easterly direction from the Charing Cross intersection, across Williamson Street and Sidney Myer Place, then across Bull Street and William Vahland Place, to continue as McCrae Street. It is part of the Midland Highway, a major regional highway in Victoria. Pall Mall runs parallel to the south-eastern side of Bendigo Creek and the south-eastern boundaries of Rosalind Park, the Queen's Gardens and the Conservatory Gardens.

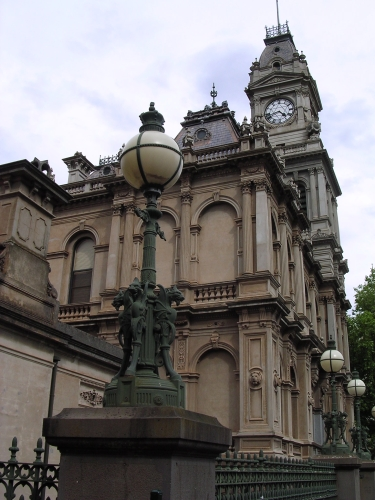
Bendigo Post Office on Pall Mall

== History ==
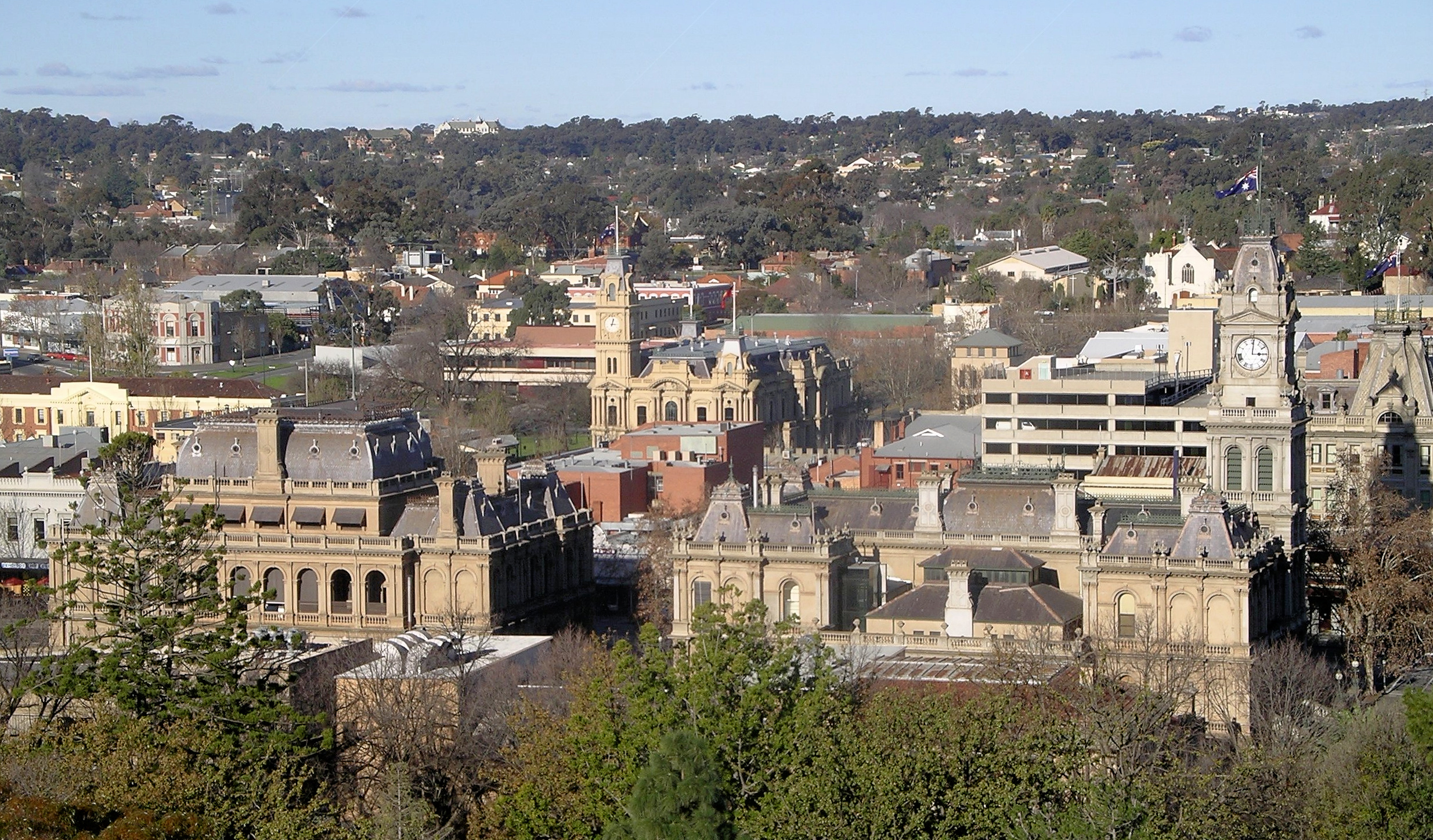
Bendigo from Camp Hill with Pall Mall running left to right in the centre of the picture

After rapid European settlement in the Bendigo Valley following the official discovery of gold on Bendigo Creek in October 1851, "Pall Mall", together with the neighbouring "Charing Cross" junction, was planned in 1858 by the government and district surveyor Richard William Larritt, who planned the original township of "Sandhurst" in his "Plan of the Valley of Bendigo". Bendigo was officially named "Sandhurst" from 1853 to 1891. In 1861, to "retain an association with Pall Mall and Charing Cross", there was even a proposal to give the name St James's Park to what became the adjacent Rosalind Park, as St James's Park in London is also in the immediate proximity of Charing Cross and Pall Mall.

As Pall Mall in Bendigo was further developed in the late 1860s, the street was planned as the location for many of Bendigo's most important civic buildings and landmarks including the former Bendigo Post Office (now the Bendigo Visitor Centre and Post Office Gallery), the Old Bendigo Law Courts Building, the Bendigo Soldiers' Memorial Institute Military Museum, the Shamrock Hotel, and the intersection with Bull Street offering a vista to the Bendigo Town Hall.

There is also much fine statuary along Pall Mall, including statues of Queen Victoria and mining entrepreneur George Lansell, the father of Sir George Victor Lansell.

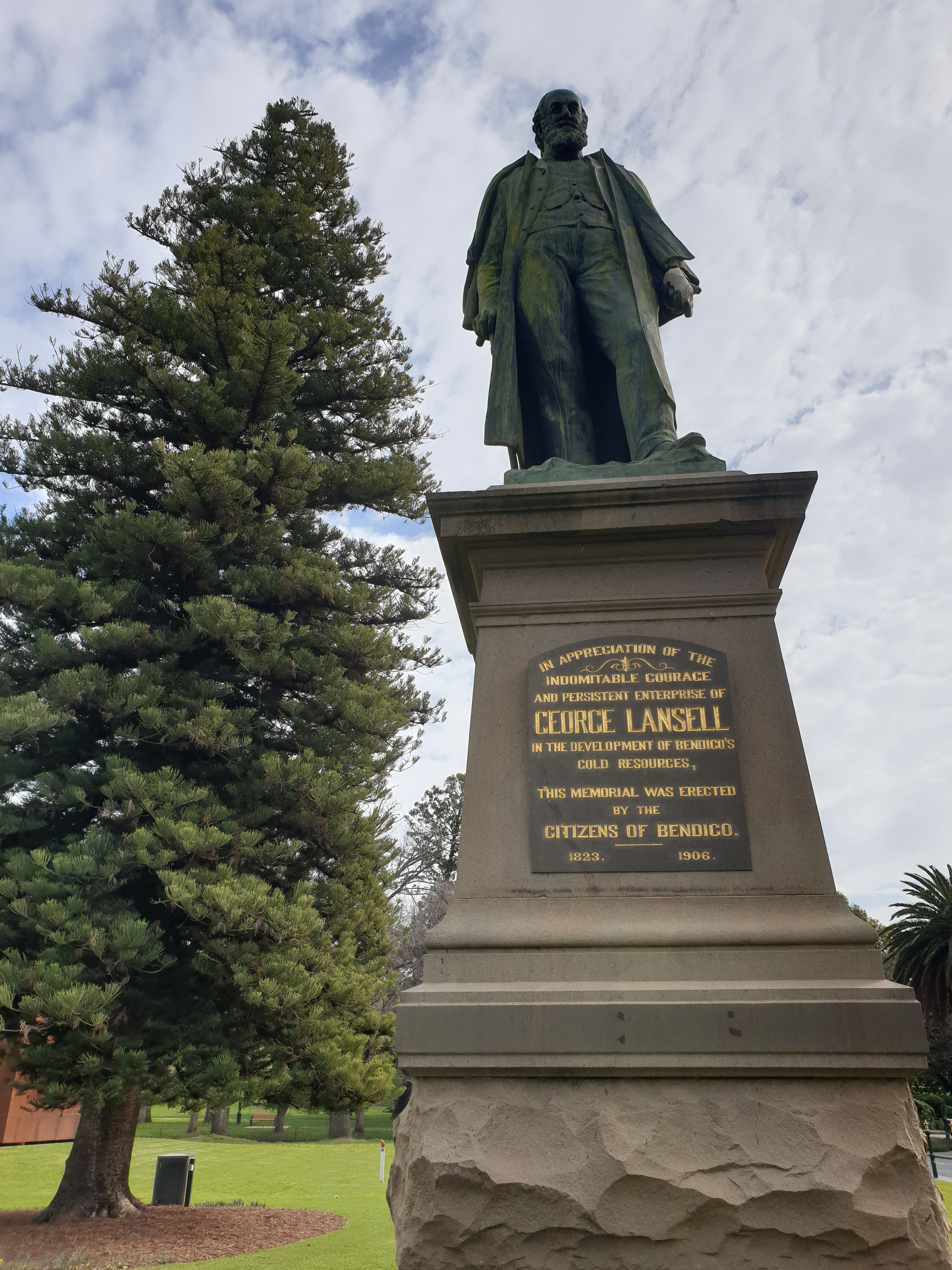
Statue of George Lansell on Pall Mall in Bendigo

== Notable 19th-century buildings ==
- Bendigo Post Office (now Visitor Centre)
- Old Bendigo Law Courts Building
- Bendigo Soldiers' Memorial Institute Military Museum
- Shamrock Hotel
- Vista to Bendigo Town Hall via Bull Street
