= Big Hill (City of Greater Bendigo) =

Coordinates: 36.835°S 144.23°E

- Suburb
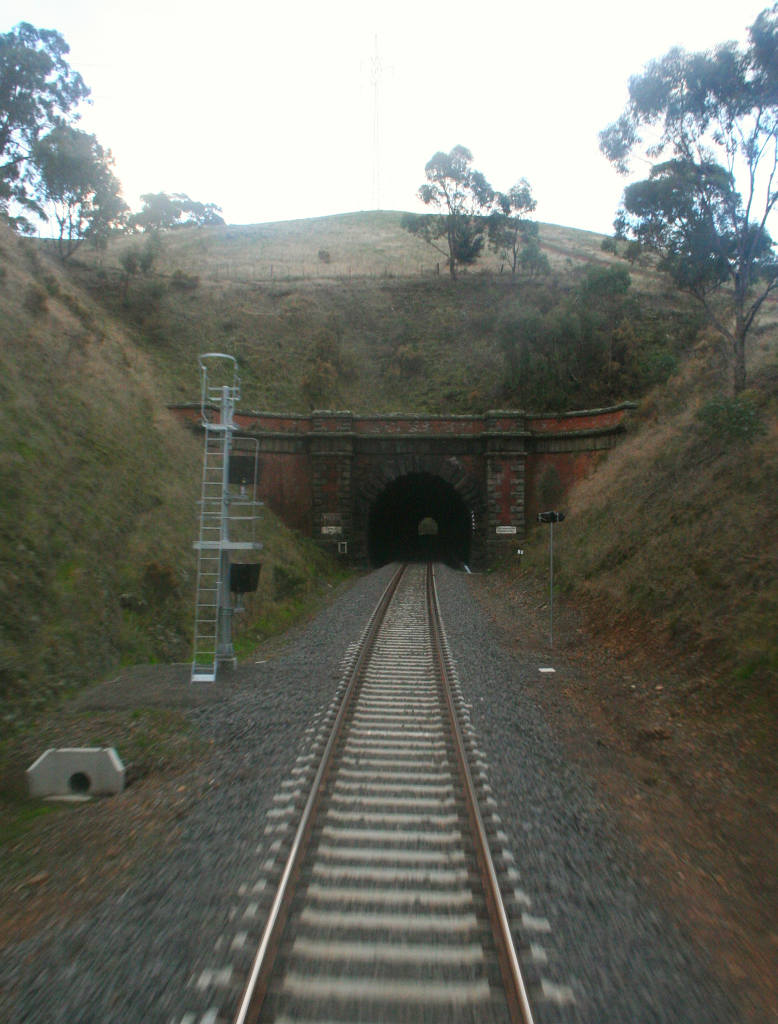
- The portal of the Big Hill railway tunnel, 390 metres long
- Interactive map of Big Hill
- Country: Australia
- State: Victoria
- City: Bendigo
- LGA: City of Greater Bendigo

Government
  - State electorate: Bendigo West
  - Federal division: Bendigo

Population
  - Total: 281 (2021)
- Postcode: 3555

Big Hill is a suburb in the City of Greater Bendigo. It forms part of the Big Hill range to the immediate south of the city of Bendigo. It is the southern part of the rim of forested hills surrounding the Bendigo Valley in which the city of Bendigo is located. The Calder Highway and the Midland Highway, which join to form the main route into Bendigo from Melbourne, pass through a prominent cutting in Big Hill as the southern gateway to Bendigo. The route over Big Hill has marked the main southern entrance to the Bendigo Valley since 1851.

== Etymology ==
Big Hill is, as its name suggests, a big hill. Originally known as "The Big Hill", it forms a highly visible topographic feature approaching the Bendigo Valley to the north of Mount Alexander as the surrounding landscape between Mount Alexander and Big Hill is only gently undulating.

== History ==
Since the official discovery of gold on Bendigo Creek in the Bendigo Valley in October 1851, the route over Big Hill has remained the main southern entrance to the Bendigo Valley.

Granite for the entrance portal of the 390-metre long Big Hill Railway Tunnel, constructed in 1862, was locally quarried in the Big Hill range.
