= Charing Cross (Bendigo) =

Major junction centrally located in the city of Bendigo, Victoria, Australia

Coordinates: 36°45′34″S 144°16′42″E

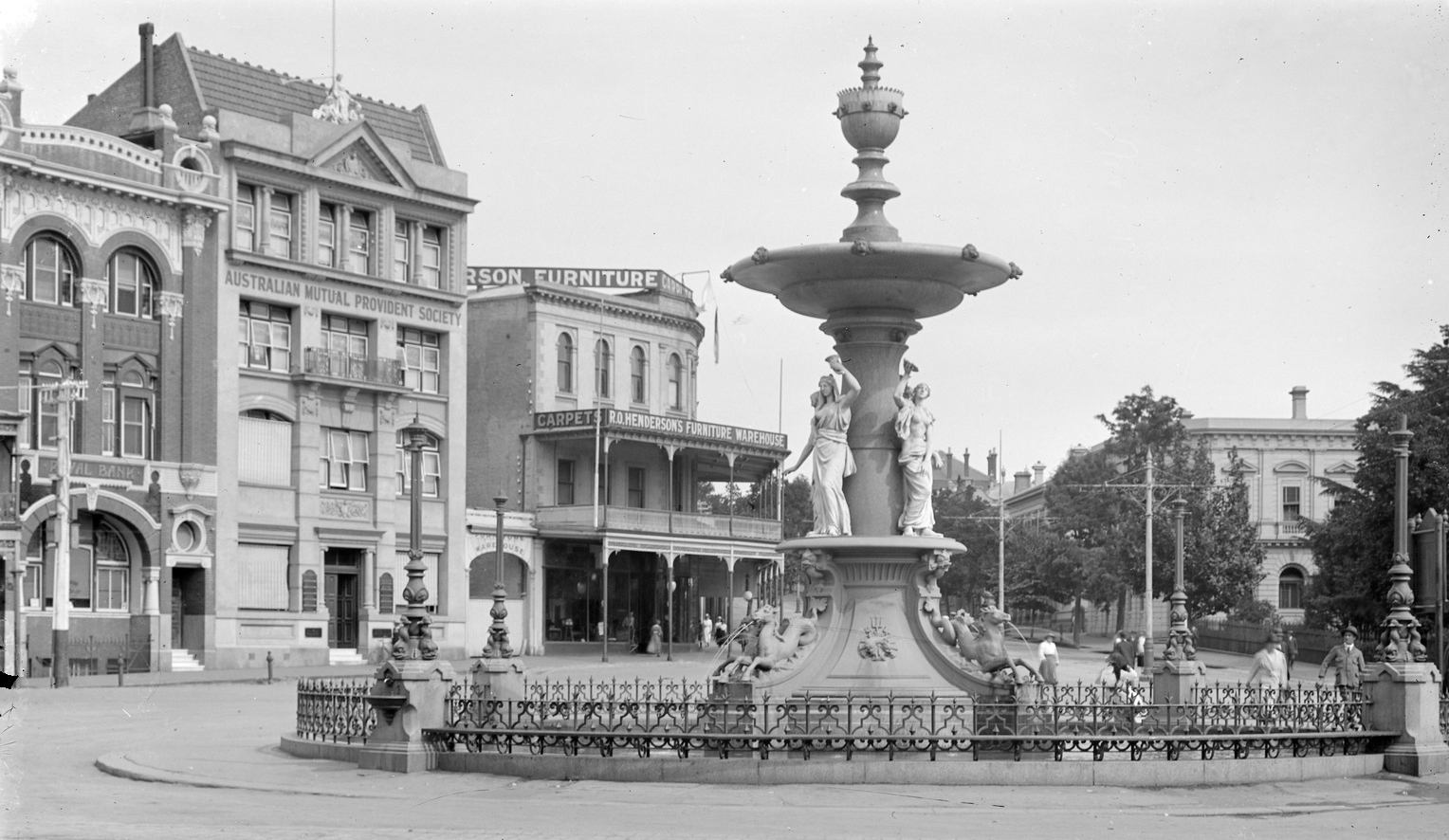
Alexandra Fountain in Charing Cross, c. 1920s, now listed along with the surrounding buildings on the Victorian Heritage Register

Charing Cross (/ˈtʃærɪŋ/ CHARR-ing) is a major junction centrally located in the city of Bendigo, Victoria, Australia. It is the intersection, or crossing point, of four of Bendigo's main streets: High Street, View Street, Pall Mall and Mitchell Street. As the Midland Highway, one of Bendigo's main thoroughfares, passes through Charing Cross, the highway is named High Street to the south-west and Pall Mall to the north-east of Charing Cross.

== Etymology ==
Charing Cross in Bendigo is named for Charing Cross in England, the junction in London which, since the early 19th century, has been the notional "centre of London". Like its English namesake, Pall Mall in Bendigo is also in the immediate vicinity of Charing Cross.

== History ==
After rapid European settlement in the Bendigo Valley following the official discovery of gold on Bendigo Creek in October 1851, the "Charing Cross" junction, together with neighbouring "Pall Mall", was planned in 1858 by the government and district surveyor Richard William Larritt, who planned the original township of "Sandhurst" in his "Plan of the Valley of Bendigo". Bendigo was officially named "Sandhurst" from 1853 to 1891. In 1861, to "retain an association with Pall Mall and Charing Cross", there was even a proposal to give the name St James's Park to what became the adjacent Rosalind Park, as St James's Park in London is also in the immediate proximity of Charing Cross and Pall Mall.

== Features ==
Charing Cross is the location of the Alexandra Fountain. The fountain, one of Bendigo's prominent 19th-century landmarks designed by the notable goldfields architect William Vahland, is built on a wide bridge spanning a large viaduct above the Bendigo Creek which runs beneath the intersection.

The location of Charing Cross has been a crossing point over the Bendigo Creek since the 1840s.

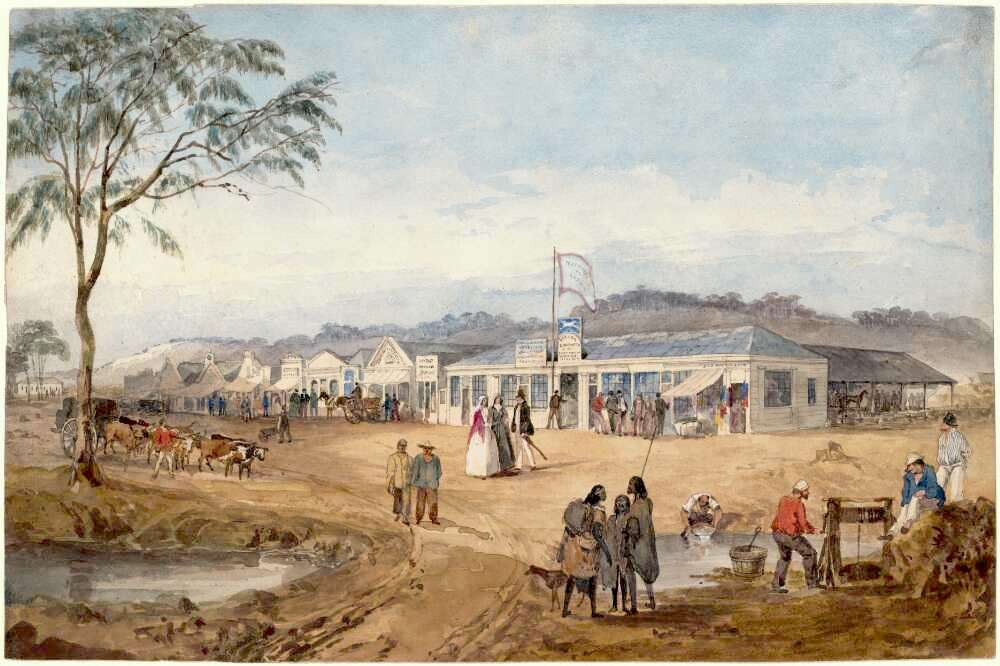
A watercolour painting by an unknown 19th-century artist of McPherson's Store in Bendigo in 1853, the present location of Charing Cross and the Alexandra Fountain

Charing Cross was also the intersection of Bendigo's two main tram lines, one line of which survives today as part of the infrastructure of trams in Bendigo. The Charing Cross tram stop is the second stop on the vintage "Talking Tram" network which is operated by Bendigo Tramways, under the supervision of the Bendigo Trust.

The main entrance to Rosalind Park is at the north-western corner of Charing Cross, through the Queen's Gardens which feature a prominent statue of Queen Victoria, the reigning British monarch when the city of Bendigo was founded in 1851.

The south-eastern corner of Charing Cross is the location of the Bendigo and Adelaide Bank's head office, the only Australian bank headquarters located outside a capital city.

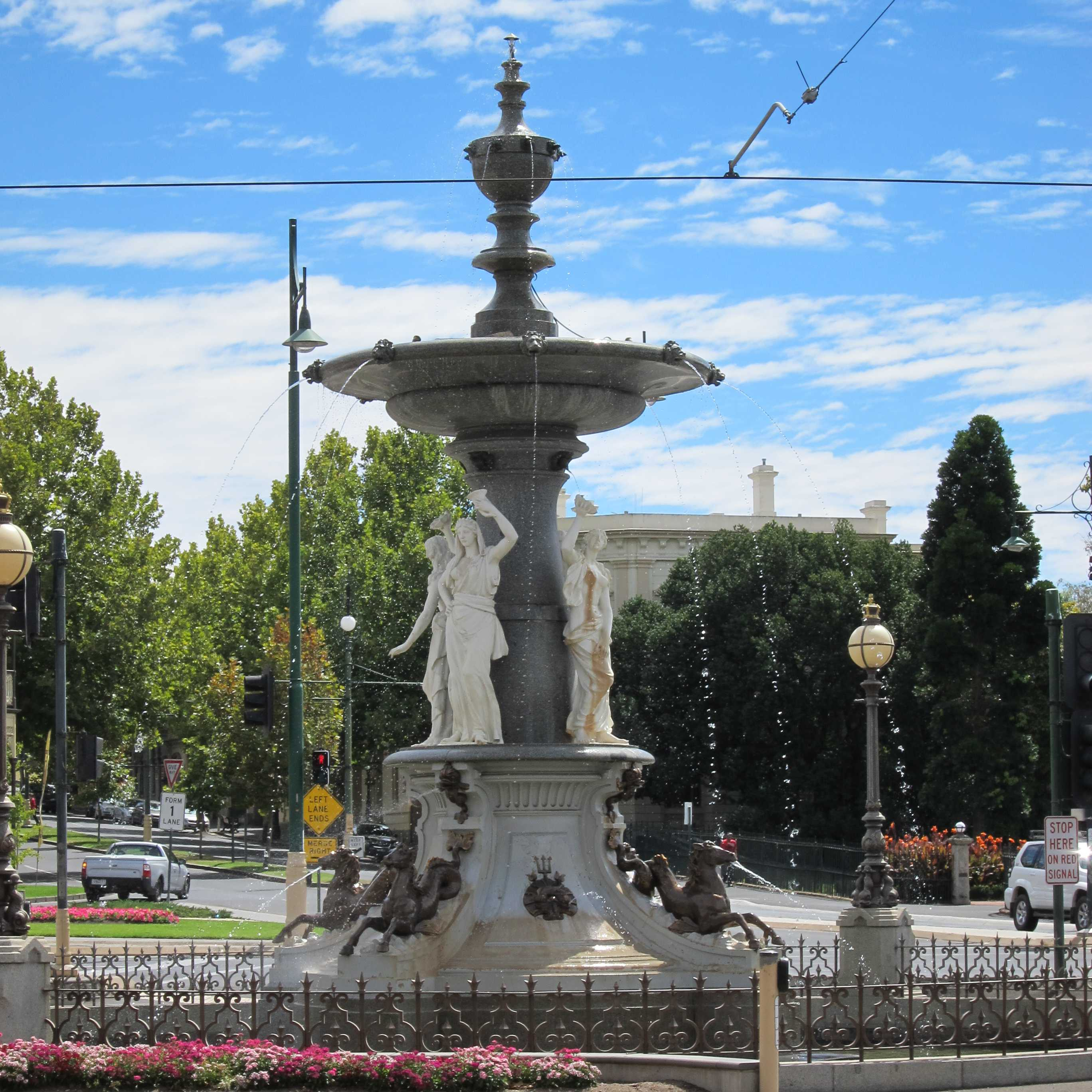
Alexandra Fountain in Charing Cross
