= Old Bendigo Law Courts Building =

Bendigo Law Courts
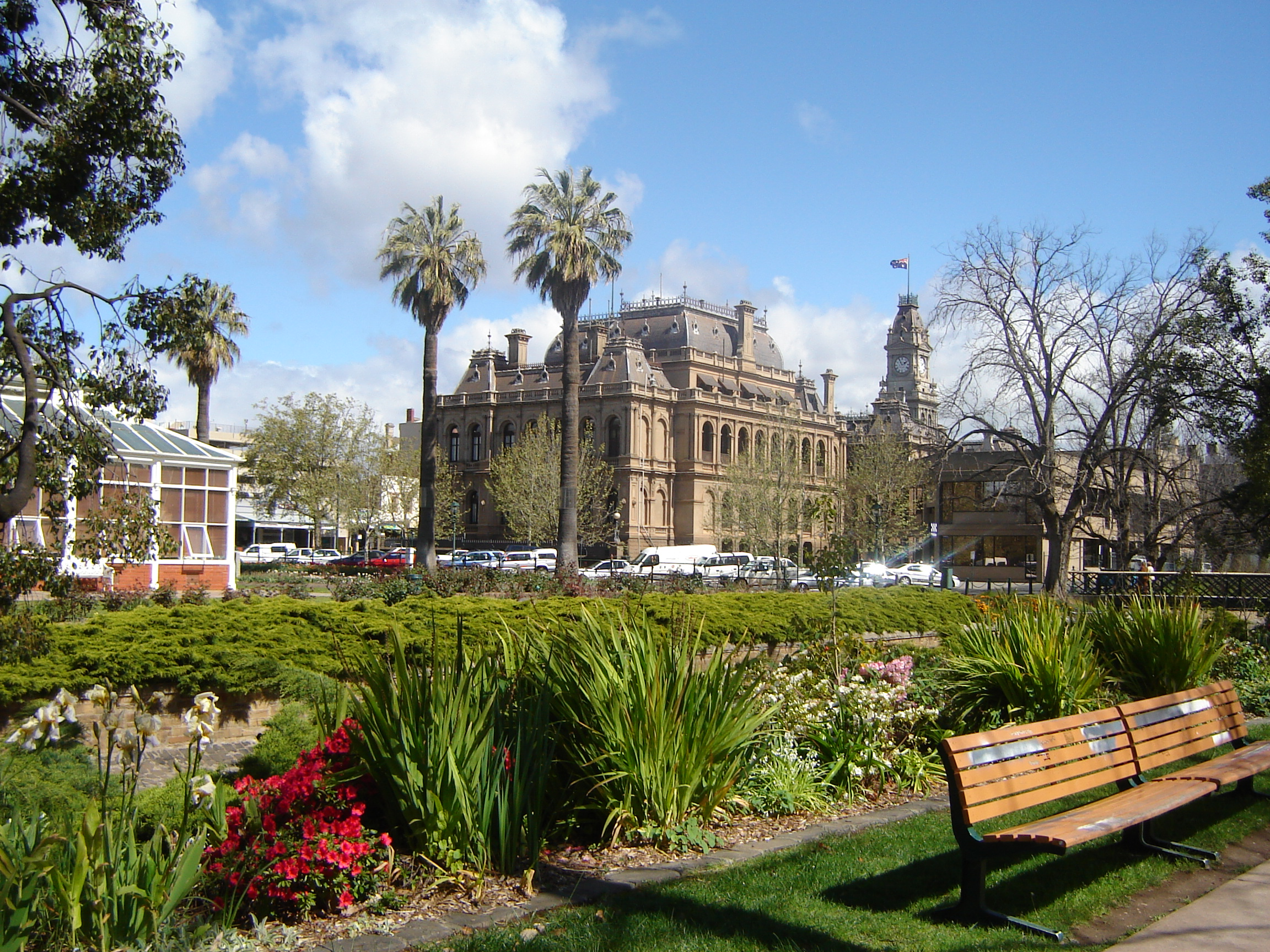

- Location within Victoria

General information
- Architectural style: Victorian Second Empire
- Location: Bendigo, Victoria, Australia
- Coordinates: 36.7578°S 144.2807°E
- Construction started: 1892
- Completed: 1896

Design and construction
- Architect: George W. Watson

Website
- www.magistratescourt.vic.gov.au/court/bendigo-magistrates-court

The Old Bendigo Law Courts Building is a building on Pall Mall in Bendigo, a regional city in the Australian state of Victoria. The courts back onto and are partly surrounded by Rosalind Park. The building was built between 1892 and 1896 by the contractors McCulloch and McAlpine and designed by Public Works architect George W. Watson. The building was constructed in the Victorian Second Empire style been described as reminiscent of an Italianate palazzo and shares a great deal with its neighbouring building, the Bendigo Post Office, which was also designed and built by Watson, McColloch and McAlpine 10 years earlier. The Law Courts are built of rendered brick and Harcourt (Victoria) Bluestone.

The Bendigo Law Courts are aesthetically significant for its high qualities of design and construction, which are reflected in the building's innovative planning, axial expression, carefully proportioned hierarchical spatial arrangement, internal decoration, fittings and refined detailing.

The Bendigo Law Courts remained in use until 2023 when they were moved to a new building on the corner of Mundy and Hargreaves street that began construction in 2020. The Bendigo Law Courts are included in the Victorian Heritage Register (item number B5126).
