= Big Hill Tunnel =

Railway tunnel in Bendigo, Australia

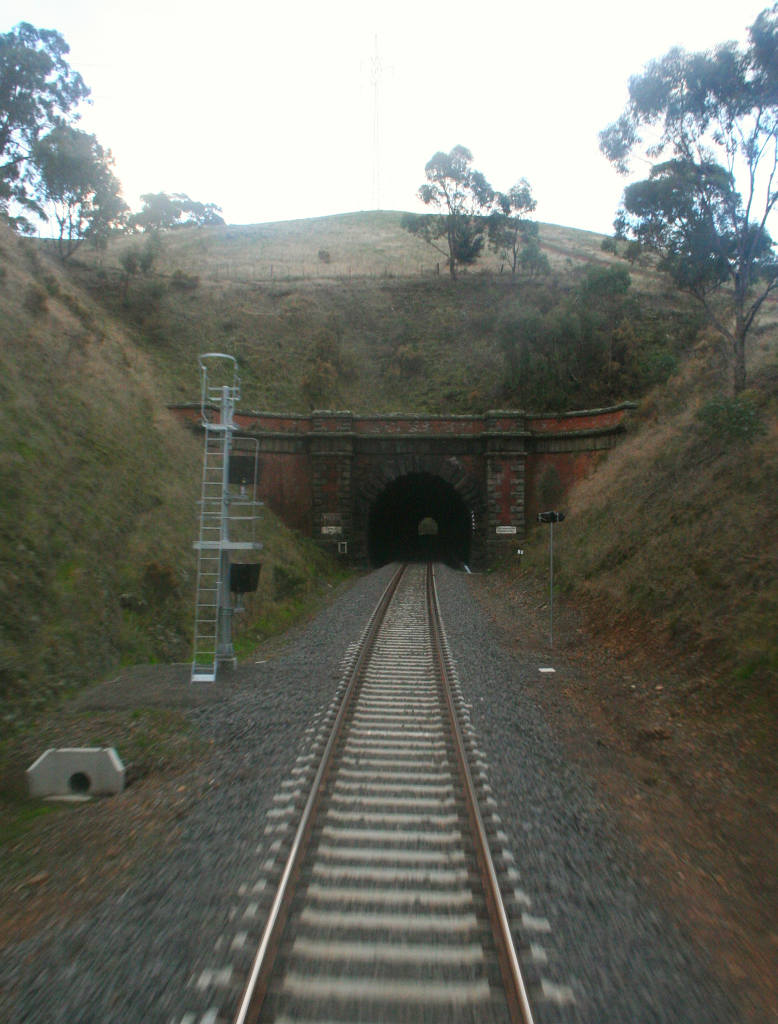
- Southern portal of the tunnel, originally double-tracked, 2006

- Location of the tunnel in Victoria
- Interactive map of Big Hill Tunnel

Overview
- Line: Bendigo line
- Location: near Bendigo, North Central Victoria
- Coordinates: 36°51′12″S 144°13′53″E
- Status: Open

Operation
- Work began: c. 1859
- Constructed: Cornish and Bruce
- Opened: c. 1860
- Owner: Melbourne, Mount Alexander and Murray River Railway Company (to 1856); Victorian Railways (from 1856)
- Operator: Victorian Railways

Technical
- Length: 390 m (1,280 ft)

Victorian Heritage Register
- Official name: Big Hill Railway Precinct (murray Valley Railway, Melbourne to Echuca)
- Type: Registered place
- Criteria: Historical, scientific and archaeological importance
- Designated: 25 February 1999
- Reference no.: H1787
- Category: Transport - Rail

The Big Hill Tunnel is a railway tunnel, located in Big Hill, Bendigo, in the North Central region of Victoria, Australia. The tunnel was built as part of the Melbourne–Echuca railway or Bendigo line.

The tunnel and associated infrastructure were added to the Victorian Heritage Register on 25 February 1999, due to the structure's historical, scientific and archaeological importance.

== Overview ==
It was commenced by the private Melbourne, Mount Alexander and Murray River Railway Company. When the company experienced financial difficulties it was taken over by the Victorian colonial government in 1856, with the Victorian Railways Department being formed to operate the new public railway system.

The line opened in five stages from February 1859 to September 1864, and was at the time the largest engineering undertaking in the Colony of Victoria. More than 6,000 men were involved in the construction of the Bendigo line, the main contractors being Cornish and Bruce.

The line served a strategic economic need of serving the important goldfields of Castlemaine and Bendigo (then called Sandhurst), and capturing for Melbourne the trade in wool and other goods from northern Victoria and the Riverina, which was being shipped through South Australia via the Murray River.

The 390-metre-long (1,280 ft) Big Hill Tunnel was the longer of the two tunnels built on the line. It is located under Big Hill between Kangaroo Flat and Ravenswood, south of Bendigo. Like the other tunnel on the line, the Elphinstone Tunnel, it was double-tracked when built, but was singled as part of the Regional Fast Rail project.

The Elphinstone Tunnel, 385 metres (1,263 ft) long, was built in brick and bluestone as a double-track horseshoe profile tunnel, and was completed in 1860.
