= Shamrock Hotel, Bendigo =

Hotel in Bendigo, Victoria, Australia

Coordinates: 36°45′31″S 144°16′50″E

Shamrock Hotel
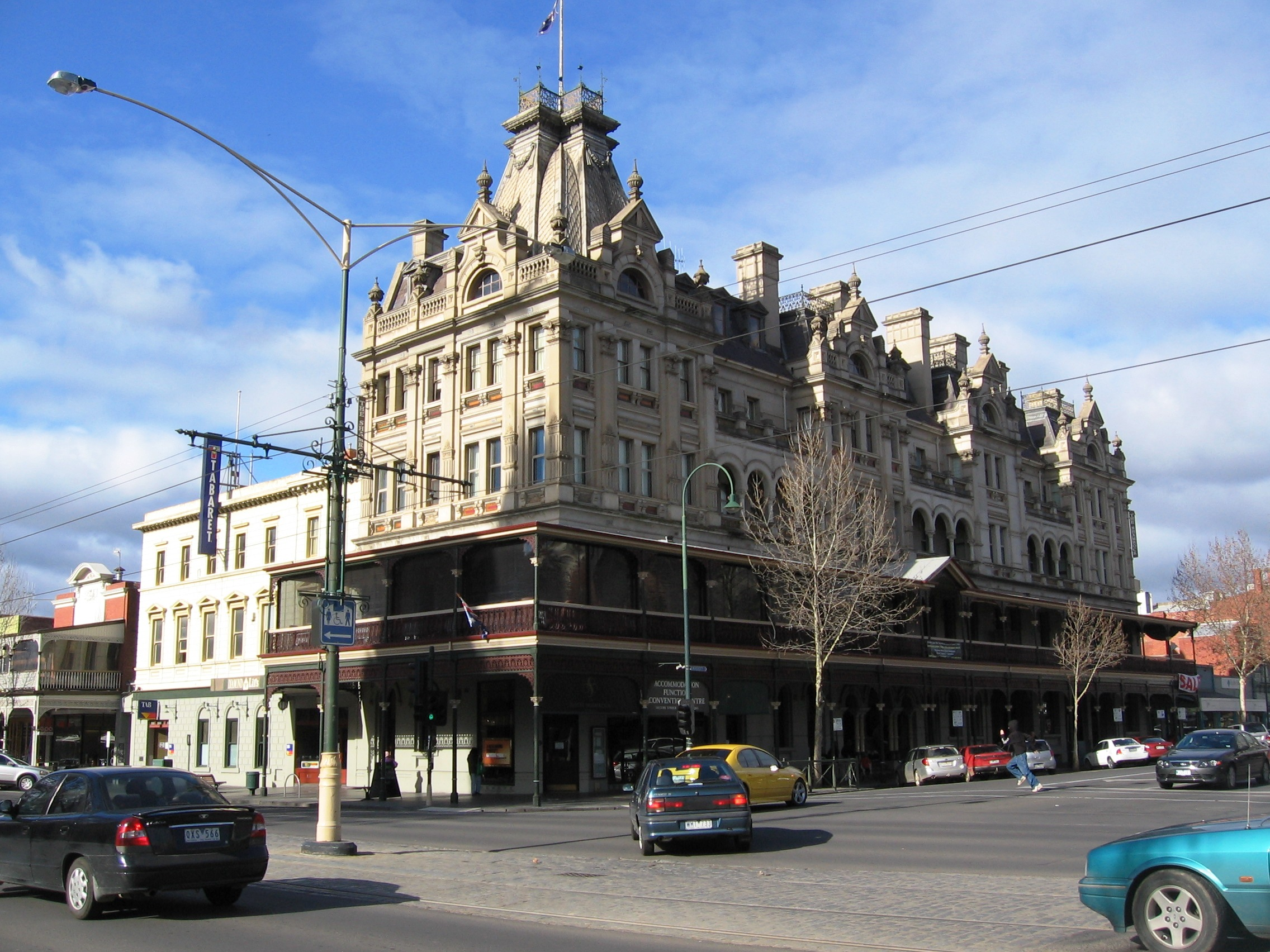
- View from Pall Mall, 2008

General information
- Location: Corner of Pall Mall and Williamson Street, Bendigo, Vic, 3550
- Opening: 1854 (Exchange Hotel); 1855 (Shamrock Hotel); 1860 (rebuilt - Shamrock Hotel); 1897 (rebuilt - Shamrock Hotel); 1981 (re-opened) Shamrock Hotel; 2008 (rebranded) Hotel Shamrock

Technical details
- Floor count: 5

Design and construction
- Architect: Phillip Kennedy

Other information
- Number of rooms: 28
- Number of suites: 4
- Number of restaurants: 3. 1x Bistro, 1x Fine Dining, 1x Gaming
- Parking: off-site

Website
- hotelshamrock.com.au

The Shamrock Hotel, currently trading as Hotel Shamrock, is a grand 19th-century hotel in Bendigo, Victoria, Australia, situated on Pall Mall, the city's main street.

The current Shamrock building is a major landmark of Bendigo and is of historic and architectural significance to the nation of Australia and to the state of Victoria as part of a significant streetscape and collection of late Victorian buildings in a similar style.

== History ==
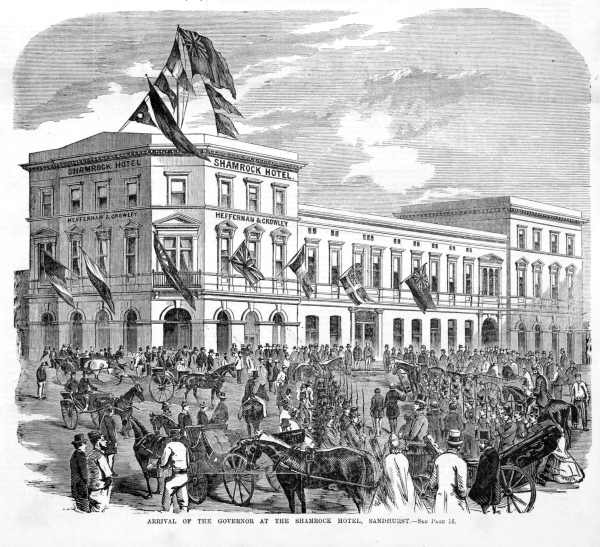
The Shamrock Hotel in 1864

The Shamrock began life in 1854, as a small hotel known as The Exchange Hotel, servicing miners during the Victorian gold rush and including a Cobb & Co office and a concert hall known as the Theatre Royal.

The hotel's patronage had grown quickly with the booming goldfields and it was renamed "The Shamrock" in 1855. The same year the Theatre Royal hosted Lola Montez performing for the diggers who threw gold nuggets at her feet, many of which the Shamrock staff took as tips while cleaning. The Bendigo Shakespeare and Literary Society also performed at the theatre from 1861.

Completely rebuilt in 1864, the Shamrock became a large hotel with two triple storey palazzo in the Victorian Regency architecture style. By this time the Shamrock had become the main hotel in central Sandhurst (as Bendigo was then known) and was the accommodation of choice of visiting dignitaries to the valley's goldfields district including governor, Charles Henry Darling.

A large double storey verandah was added in the 1870s.

=== Design and building ===
In 1897 the hotel was once again completely rebuilt to the design of Phillip Kennedy, an understudy of Germans migrant architect William Vahland, who is attributed for the four-storey Second Empire architecture design with basement level and a distinctive and tall fifth storey mansard roof. The elaborate "boom style" building features detailed stucco mouldings and a distinctively Australia feature in its Victorian Filigree-styled double storey wraparound iron lacework verandah. The entry patio has the hotel's name in mosaic parquetry and the name is also etched into the glass of the transom light. Part of the ambitious brief was to construct a rival in grandeur to Melbourne's Grand Hotel (now Windsor Hotel). The construction contractors were Baxter and Boyne.

The Shamrock played a role in the history of Australia when in 1898 it hosted the Australian Natives' Association at the banquet hall at which Alfred Deakin made a speech in support for the federation of Australia.

Dame Nellie Melba was one of the notable guests of the hotel during the Edwardian era, staying in the third floor corner suite opposite the Bendigo Post Office clock tower and demanded its hourly chime be turned off.

Other notable guests included Harry Lauder, Ignacy Jan Paderewski, John McCormack and Richard Strauss.

=== 1970s demolition threat ===
In the 1970s the Shamrock, like many grand hotels around Australia, had waned in popularity and was under threat of demolition as one of several sites in being proposed for speculative office blocks. The Rupert Hamer state government stepped in, acquiring the hotel for $240,000 to save it and nominated it of state heritage significance.

=== Restoration and reopening ===
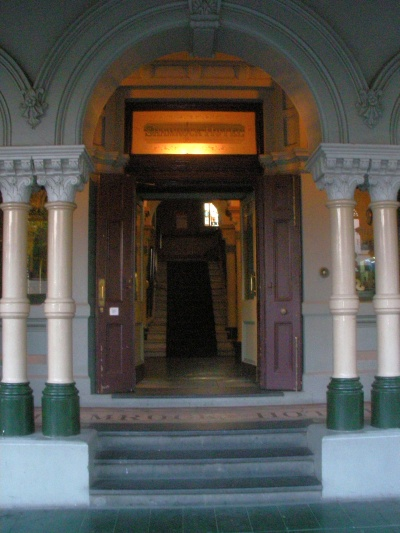
Entrance

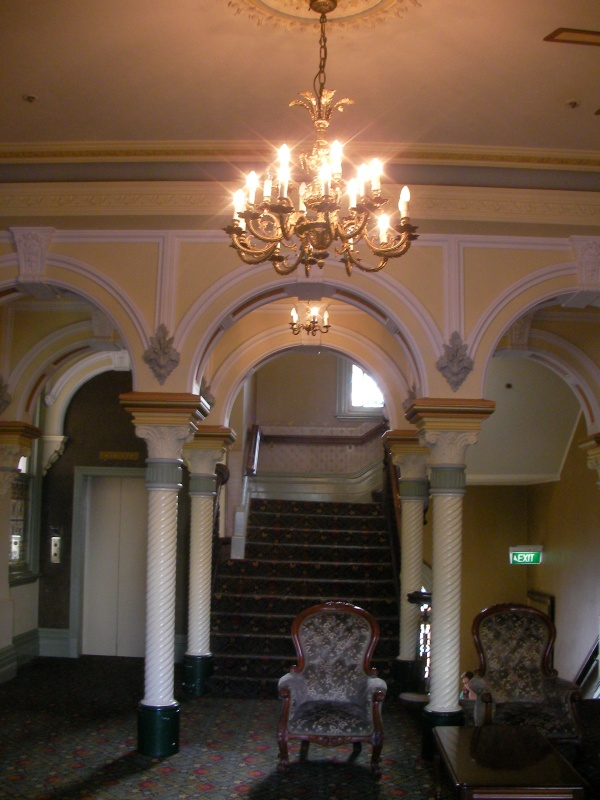
First floor parlour

The Victorian Public Works Department subsequently undertook a major restoration project at a cost of approximately $2.5 million which was finally completed on 14 April 1981. While many historic interior features were intact including the grand staircase, verandah, second storey parlour, halls and arches and 1920s elevator most of the rooms were upgraded with modern facilities and the top storey beneath the mansard roof, which were subject to water ingress and pigeon roosting was boarded off and the basement level was closed. The hotel was leased to Clover Hotels.

Among the high-profile guests after the reopening were Charles, Prince of Wales, and Diana, Princess of Wales, during a royal visit in 1983.

The Shamrock is privately operated and was previously part of the Comfort Inn chain. It remains one of Bendigo's most popular venue for functions and photography, particularly wedding receptions.

== Heritage recognition ==
The Shamrock was given a state interim heritage protection order in 1975. The hotel was recognised with national significance to Australia in 1978 when it was added to the Register of the National Estate (4298).

It is currently recognised by Heritage Victoria as being of state heritage significance (H0914) and listed on the Victorian Heritage Register. The Shamrock is also classified by the National Trust of Victoria (B1853) as being of state significance.
