= Bendigo Post Office =

Coordinates: 36.75816°S 144.28010°E

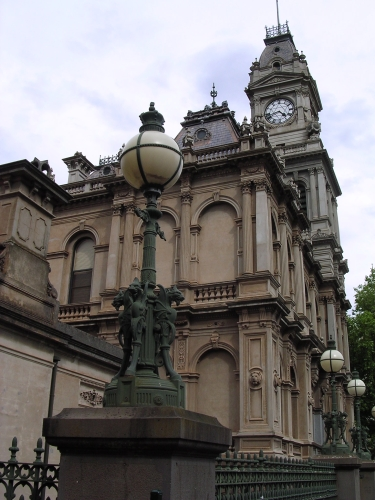

General information
- Location: Bendigo, Victoria, Australia
- Construction started: 1883
- Completed: 1887

The Bendigo Post Office is a building on Pall Mall in Bendigo, a provincial city in the Australian state of Victoria. The post office backs onto and is partly surrounded by Rosalind Park. The building was built between 1883 and 1887 by the contractors McCulloch and McAlpine and designed by Public Works architect George W. Watson in the Second Empire architectural style. The building shares a great deal with its neighbouring building, the Old Bendigo Law Courts Building, and had the same builder and designer and was built at around the same time.

Notable features of the building include its 43-metre-high (141 ft) clock tower (housing a five-bell carillon) and the elaborate facades on all four sides of building. The building was extensively restored between 1978 and 1987.

The building was used as a post office until 1997. It is currently used as Bendigo Tourism's Visitor Information Centre and won Victorian Tourism Awards in 2009 and 2010. It was further inducted into Victorian Tourism's hall of fame in 2011. It was also awarded a tourism award by Qantas in 2010, in the category of Visitor Information and Services.

Bendigo Tourism describes the Information Centre as "Australia's Grandest Visitor Centre". The Centre boasts a large information area, an adjoining First Nations Gallery – Djaa Djuwima – and a Living Arts Space, which showcases some of the region's best artists.

The building has been included on the Victorian Heritage Register as being of "architectural, historic, and aesthetic significance to Victoria".
