= Bendigo Valley =

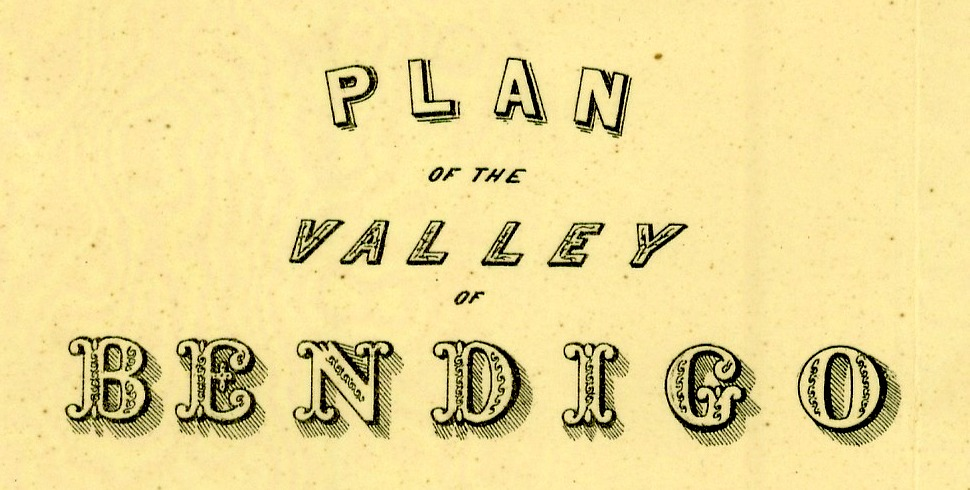
Title from Plan of the Valley of Bendigo in 1856 by R.W. Larritt

The Bendigo Valley is the region surrounding the city of Bendigo, Victoria, Australia located in North Central Victoria near the geographical centre of the state. The valley is approximately 150 kilometres (93 mi) north-west of Melbourne, the state capital. The city of Bendigo is located on the floor of, and is enclosed by, the Bendigo Valley which was formed over many millennia by the Bendigo Creek after which the valley is named. The Bendigo Creek forms a geographic spine through the city and suburbs of Bendigo. The valley is notable as a major tourist destination and is the location of one of the world's largest and longest-lived gold production areas.

Bendigo Valley is broadly surrounded by the Greater Bendigo National Park and other state forests. The 17,020-hectare (42,100-acre) park was created in 2002 from the former Whipstick State Park, Kamarooka State Park, One Tree Hill Regional Park, Mandurang State Forest and the Sandhurst State Forest.

The Calder Highway, Midland Highway and McIvor Highway are the main roads into and through the valley, connecting Bendigo with other capital and regional cities.

The Bendigo Valley contains the entire city of Bendigo and surrounding suburbs which also encompass the former Borough of Eaglehawk. The valley is located within the local government area of the City of Greater Bendigo.

== History ==
The original inhabitants of the Bendigo Valley are the Dja Dja Wurrung (Jarra) people. They exploited the rich local hunting grounds from which they were displaced by the arrival of European settlers, who established the first of many vast sheep runs in 1837.

The first European settlers, who arrived in 1837 after the survey of the area in 1836 by Major Sir Thomas Mitchell, used the Bendigo Valley for their working bullocks as the valley was "wide, gentle, well-grassed and secluded". Later the settlers brought sheep to the creek valley, making it an outstation of the Mount Alexander North pastoral run and building a hut on the creek in the valley. The creek was just within the north-eastern boundary of the Mount Alexander North pastoral run. The location on Bendigo Creek where gold was alleged to have been first discovered in October 1851 was a short distance from that shepherd's hut.

Although the Bendigo Valley was first surveyed in 1852, in 1854 the Surveyor-General of Victoria, Captain Andrew Clarke, undertook detailed survey work in the Bendigo Valley following an initial survey by William Swan Urquhart in 1852. However, it was Richard William Larritt, the district surveyor, who subsequently planned and surveyed the Bendigo Valley. Larritt included the town of Sandhurst and the hamlet of White Hills within the municipal boundary in his "Plan of the Valley of Bendigo" in 1856.

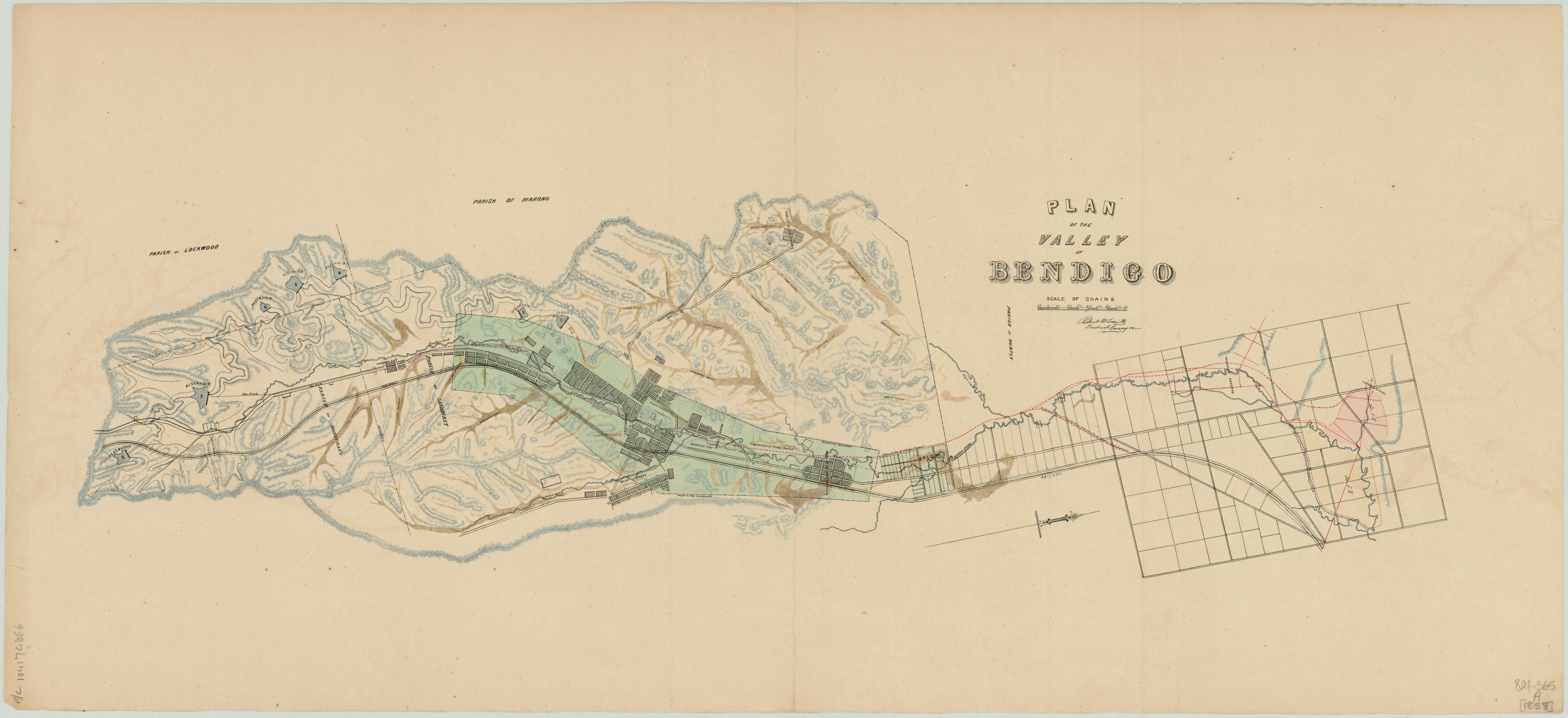
Plan of the Valley of Bendigo in 1856 by R. W. Larritt

== Etymology ==
The occupants of the Mount Alexander North run, later called the Ravenswood run, named the creek "Bendigo' Creek", originally spelled "Bednego Creek" after a local bullock driver and employee of the Mount Alexander North run. Although the bullock driver's actual name remains unknown, he "was handy with his fists" and was consequently nicknamed for the English bare-knuckle prizefighter William Abednego "Bendigo" Thompson (1811-1880) who was then at the height of his fame. So the word "Bendigo" is a corruption of the name "Abednego" in its shortened form, "Bednego".
