= Alexandra Fountain =

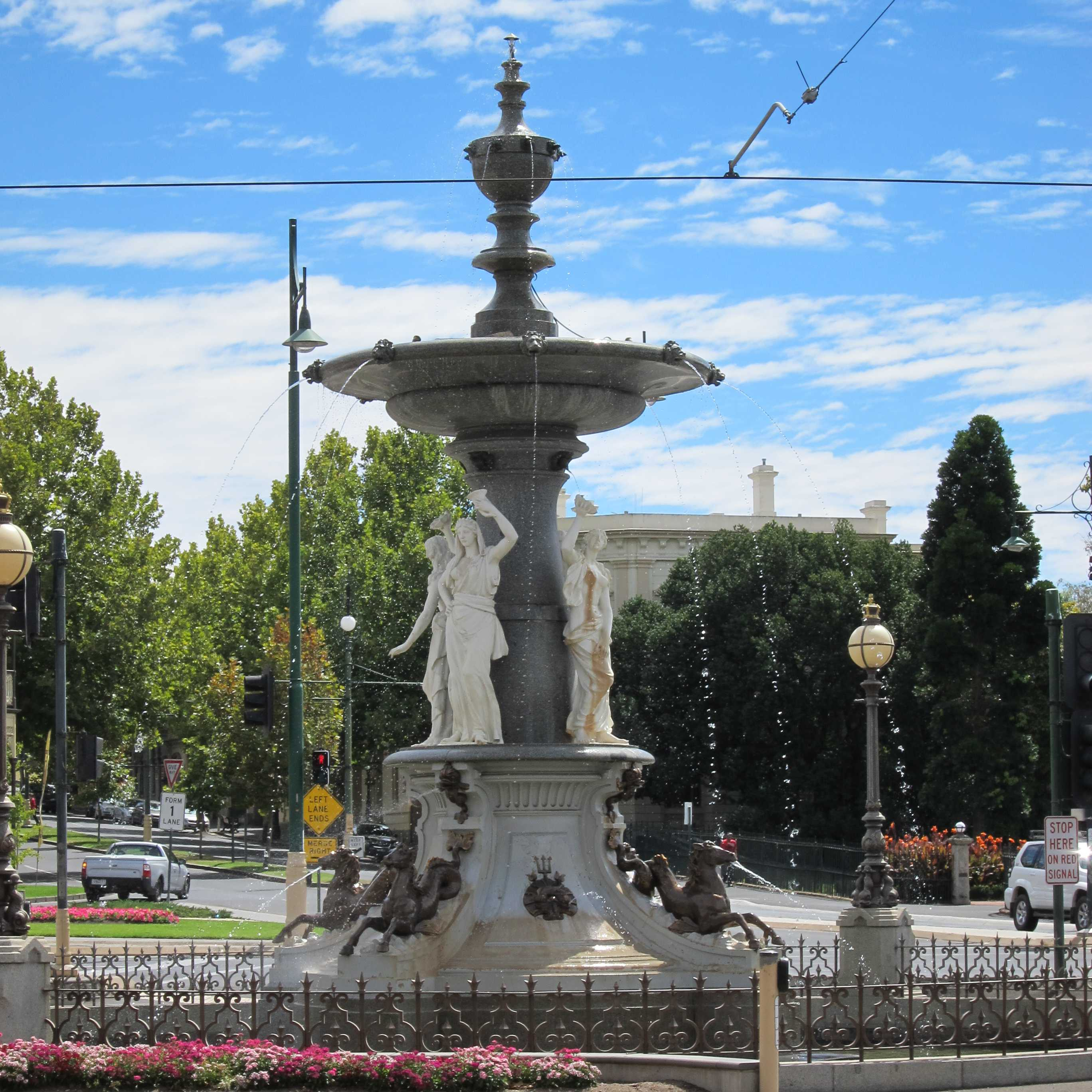
- View of Alexandra Fountain
- Interactive map of Alexandra Fountain
- Type: Fountain
- Location: Bendigo, Victoria, Australia
- Coordinates: 36°45′35″S 144°16′42″E
- Opened: 5 July 1881
- Owner: City of Greater Bendigo

Alexandra Fountain is a fountain in the Australian city of Bendigo, Victoria. It is regarded as one of the city's most prominent landmarks and monuments.

The fountain is located in Bendigo's Charing Cross area at the intersection of View Street and Pall Mall. Charing Cross effectively stands at the centre of the city and is one of Bendigo's busiest and most prominent intersections. The fountain stands opposite the main entrance of Rosalind Park.

Alexandra Fountain was funded from the proceeds of the Bendigo Juvenile Industrial Exhibition (1879), a £500 gift from George Lansell and a further £700 from the Sandhurst City Council (now the City of Greater Bendigo). The fountain was designed by William Vahland (1828–1915), a local architect responsible for some of the city's most prominent buildings. The fountain was named in honour of Alexandra, Princess of Wales. Its grand opening on 5 July 1881 was attended by her sons Prince Albert and Prince George.

Other than the Exhibition Fountain, built in 1880 and located in the Melbourne's Carlton Gardens, the Alexandra Fountain is the largest and most ornate municipal fountain in Victoria. The fountain stands 28 feet (8.5 m) high and sits in a 50 feet (15 m) diameter circular pool which itself is 2 feet (0.61 m) deep. It is made from 20 tonnes (22 tons) of Harcourt granite, cast iron and painted stone. Decoratively the fountain includes lion head spouts, four allegorical female figures, spouted bronzed mer-horses and dolphins, medallions of seashells, dolphins and tridents also decorate the fountain. The pool is bordered by a decorative cast-iron fence and lit with four cast-iron lamps.

Historically the fountain is a monument to the success of the goldfields and the Bendigo region. Aesthetically the fountain is fairly typical of late Victorian monumental design but is unusual in that few fountains were built according to this theme.

In 2017, a AU$350,000 refurbishment project was undertaken. The restoration project included repairs and repainting of the balustrade and masonry, including repainting and re-rendering the plaster work as well as plumbing and electrical work.
