= Bendigo Creek =

River in Victoria, Australia

Coordinates: 36.486944°S 144.489722°E

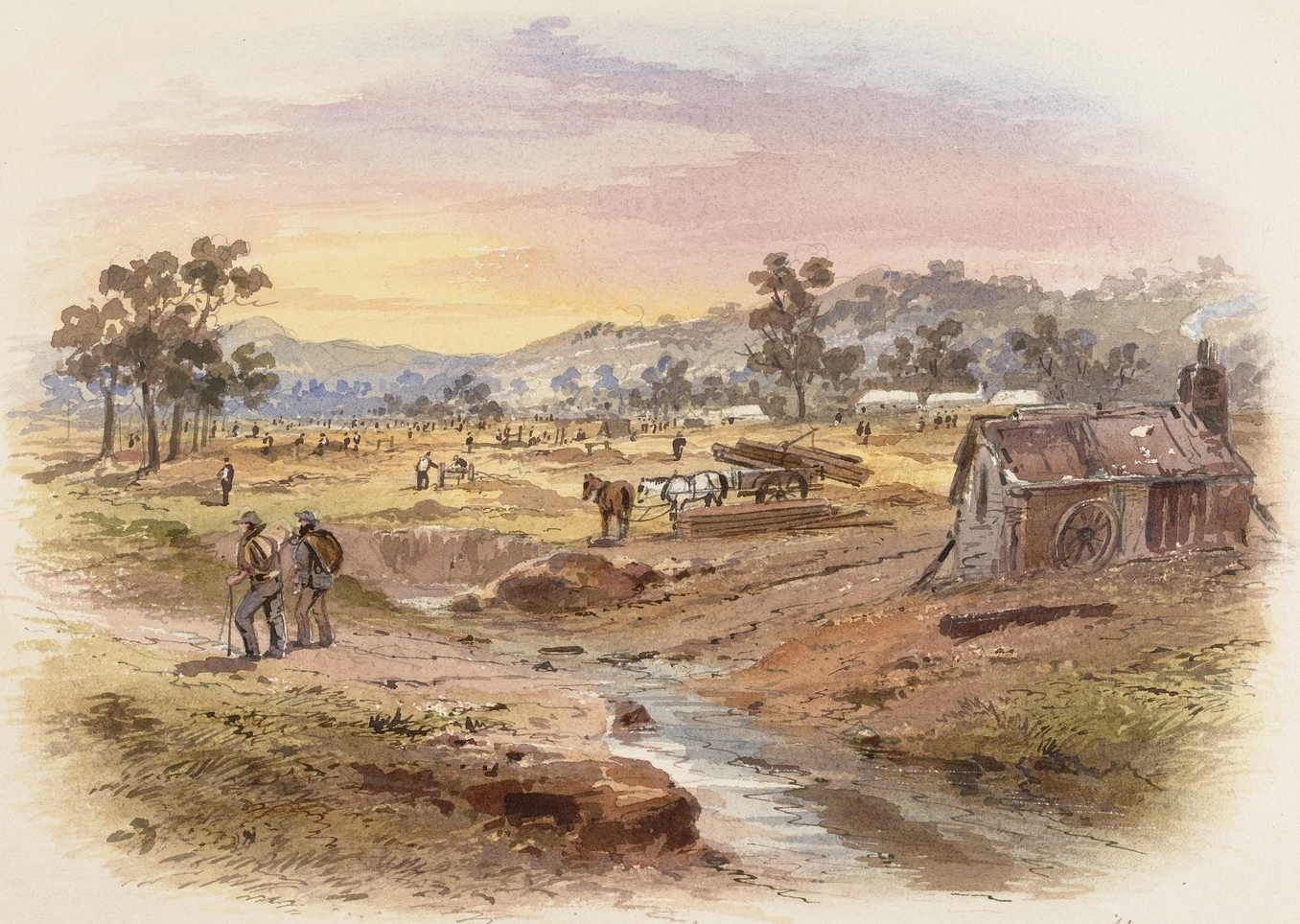
Bendigo Creek in August 1852 by the artist S.T. Gill. Gold was officially discovered at Bendigo Creek in October 1851.

Bendigo Creek is a seasonal stream, or creek, in North Central Victoria, Australia. The city of Bendigo is named for the creek and valley in which it was founded in 1851. Gold was officially discovered on Bendigo Creek in late October 1851, transforming the area in less than a year from a secluded bushland to a scene which "beggared description" as tens of thousands of men, women and children came to the area during the gold rush at Bendigo Creek in 1852.

== Location and features ==
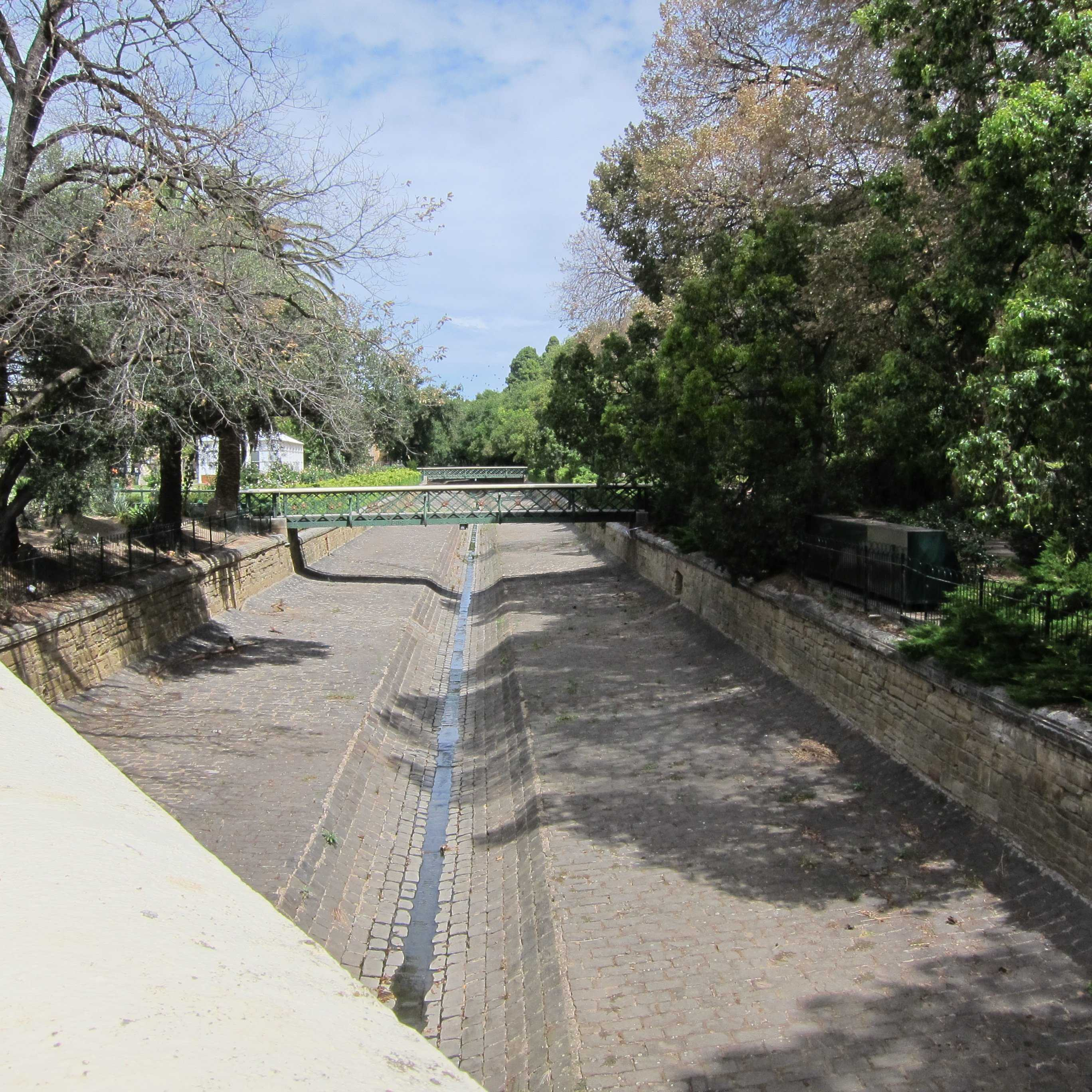
View of Bendigo Creek as it runs through Rosalind Park

The creek rises in the Big Hill range south-west of the city of Bendigo near the Crusoe Reservoir. Starting at an elevation of 287 metres, the creek almost immediately flows through the Crusoe Reservoir at 286 metres and then forms a geographic spine through Bendigo's CBD either past or under many of the city's landmarks including the Alexandra Fountain at Charing Cross, Rosalind Park, Lake Weeroona and the Bendigo Botanic Gardens. The Bendigo Creek Trail, for walkers and cyclists, follows the creek's course north-east from the Crusoe Reservoir past natural bush and historic landmarks to the Bendigo Pottery in Epsom.

The creek descends nearly 200 metres over its 153-kilometre course before joining Mount Hope Creek, northeast of Mitiamo, at an elevation of 87.3 metres. Myers Creek, Reedy Creek and Piccaninny Creek flow into Bendigo Creek.

Over many millennia, the flow of the Bendigo Creek formed the Bendigo Valley, the site of the present city of Bendigo.

== History ==
The first European settlers, who arrived in 1837 after the survey of the area in 1836 by Major Sir Thomas Mitchell, used the Bendigo Valley for their working bullocks as the valley was "wide, gentle, well-grassed and secluded". Later the settlers brought sheep to the creek valley, making it an outstation of the Mount Alexander North pastoral run and building a hut on the creek in the valley. The creek was just within the north-eastern boundary of the Mount Alexander North pastoral run. The location on Bendigo Creek where gold was alleged to have been first discovered in October 1851 was a short distance from that shepherd's hut.

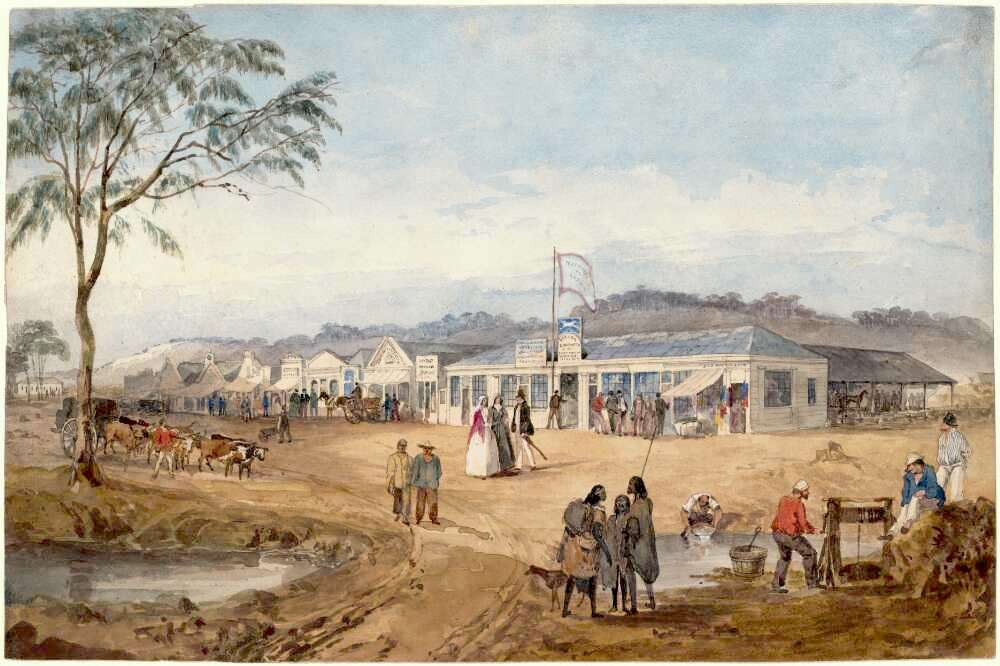
A watercolour painting by an unknown 19th-century artist of Bendigo Creek as it flows near McPherson's Store in Bendigo in 1853, the present location of Charing Cross and the Alexandra Fountain.

== Etymology ==
The occupants of the Mount Alexander North run, later called the Ravenswood run, named the creek "Bendigo' Creek", originally spelled "Bednego Creek" after a local bullock driver and employee of the Mount Alexander North run. Although the bullock driver's actual name remains unknown, he "was handy with his fists" and was consequently nicknamed for the English bare-knuckle prizefighter William Abednego "Bendigo" Thompson (1811-1880) who was then at the height of his fame. The word "Bendigo" is a corruption of the name "Abednego" in its shortened form, "Bednego". Bendigo Thompson was a famously agile boxer who initially earned the nickname "Bendy" because of his constant bobbing and weaving around the ring. His nickname evolved: "Bendy" in combination with his middle name, Abednego, became "Bendigo".
