= Rosalind Park =

Park in Victoria, Australia

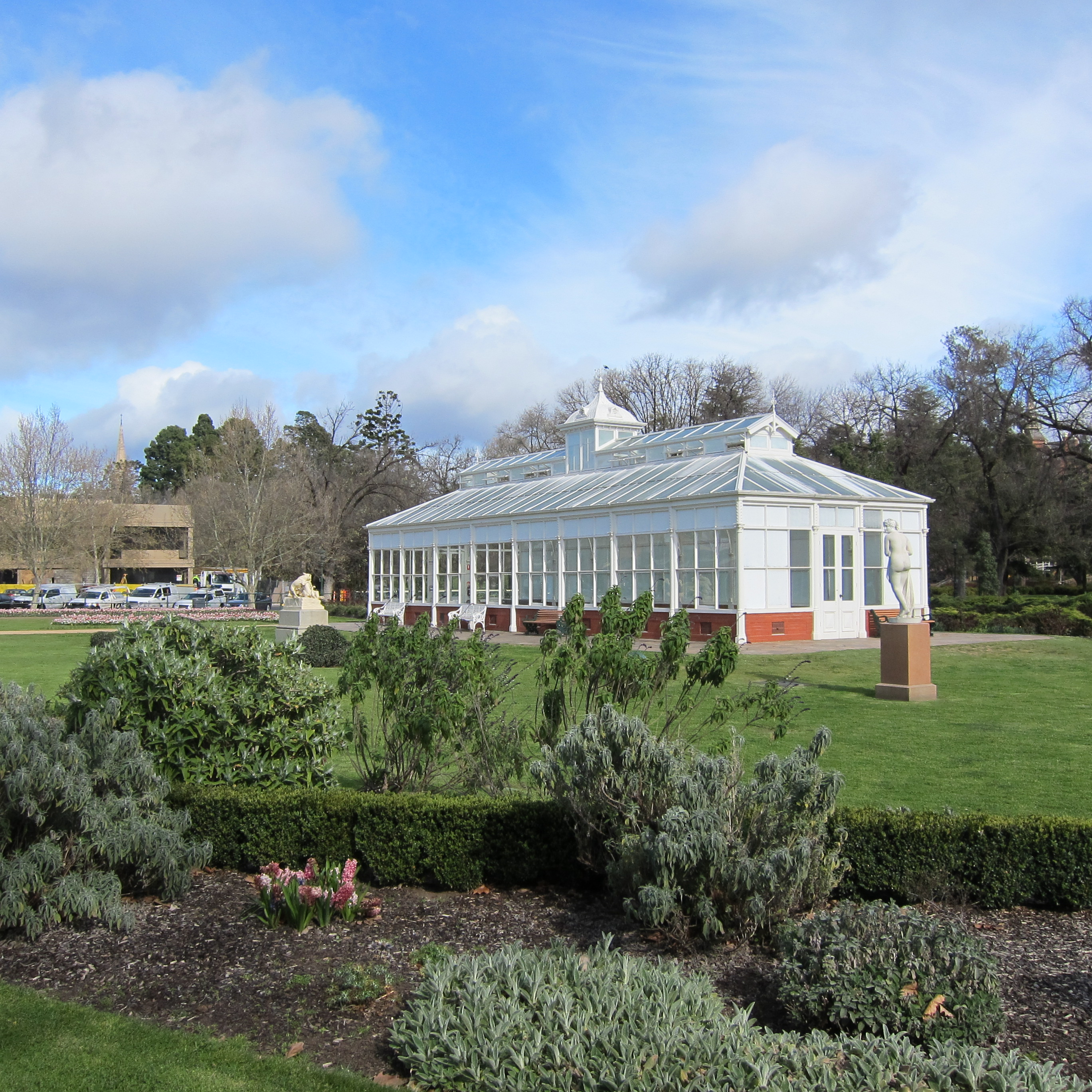
- View of the conservatory and gardens
- Interactive map of Rosalind Park
- Type: Public Park
- Location: Bendigo, Victoria
- Coordinates: 36.757°S 144.279°E
- Area: 59 acres (24 ha)
- Opened: 1870
- Owner: City of Greater Bendigo

Rosalind Park is an Australian park in Bendigo, Victoria. Prior to white settlement, a grassy woodland surrounded what is now called Bendigo Creek. At that time the creek was little more than a chain of pools and billabongs. The area would have been an important source of food and water for the indigenous Dja Dja Wurrung people living in dry central Victoria.

In the 1850s gold was discovered in the area, radically transforming the area that is now Rosalind Park. Bendigo was one of the richest gold mining regions in the world, with more gold found in the region from 1850 to 1900 than anywhere else in the world. At present it remains the seventh richest goldfield in the world. Puddling mills, shafts and piles of mine wastes and cast offs dominated the landscape. In 1852 the area was officially designated a Government Camp precinct, the bounds of which still roughly designate the park today. The Government Camp area comprised 66 acres and contained police barracks, gaol and lock-up, the former Law Courts, a gold office and other government buildings, offices and quarters.

In 1856 the local gold commissioner, Joseph Panton, first suggested that the camp should be turned into a park, but it was not until 1861 that 59 acres were formally reserved for the park and handed over to the Sandhurst Borough Council (now the City of Greater Bendigo). The first park gardener was appointed in 1870 and established the basic layout of Rosalind Park which remains to this day.

== Overview ==
The park is effectively bounded by View Street, Pall Mall, Bridge Street, Park Road and Barnard Street, but shares some of this space with the Queen Elizabeth Oval, Bendigo Senior Secondary College, Courthouse, the former Bendigo Post Office (now a tourist information centre), Camp Hill Primary School and the former Bendigo Jail which is now Ulumburra Theatre.

The Rosalind Park area is of historic significance as the site of one of the largest government camps in the Victorian goldfields as well as a significant example of a late 19th-century public park. The area is of archaeological significance given its past importance in the Bendigo goldfields as well as architectural and botanic features. The cast iron conservatory within the grounds of the parks is the only surviving example of a 19th-century conservatory in a public park in Victoria.

Rosalind Park contains a number of notable trees and plants, some listed on heritage registers in their own right. Of note are the bunya-bunya pine, hoop pine, South African yellowwood, river red gums, Canary Island pines, cedar, California bay (also known as the headache tree and the only example in Victoria), a crow's ash (one of three in Victoria), Queensland kauri along with a number elm and oak species. The Chilean wine palm, now rare in Chile, thrives despite the climate being less than ideal for this plant.

== Conservatory Gardens ==
Prior to being turned into a park in 1987, the area was used as a rubbish tip. The garden now comprises an ornate cast-iron fence as well as some notable exotic palms (Washington Fan Palm) which were planted in the late 1800s. The garden contains a range of statuary.

The garden area is used to showcase a range of floral exhibitions throughout the year, both in the garden beds and within the conservatory.

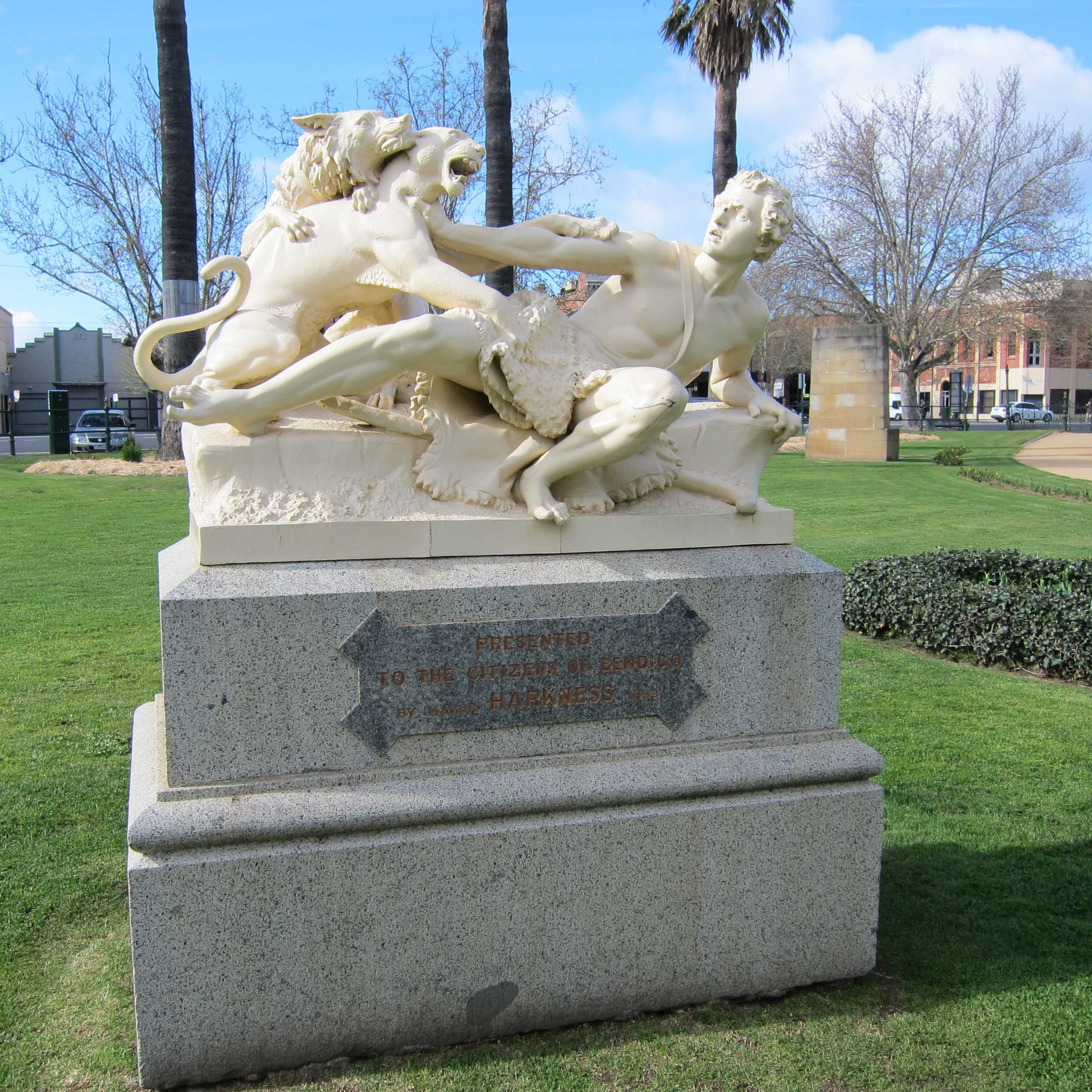
"Man Fighting Wild Animals" presented by Mayor Harkness in 1899

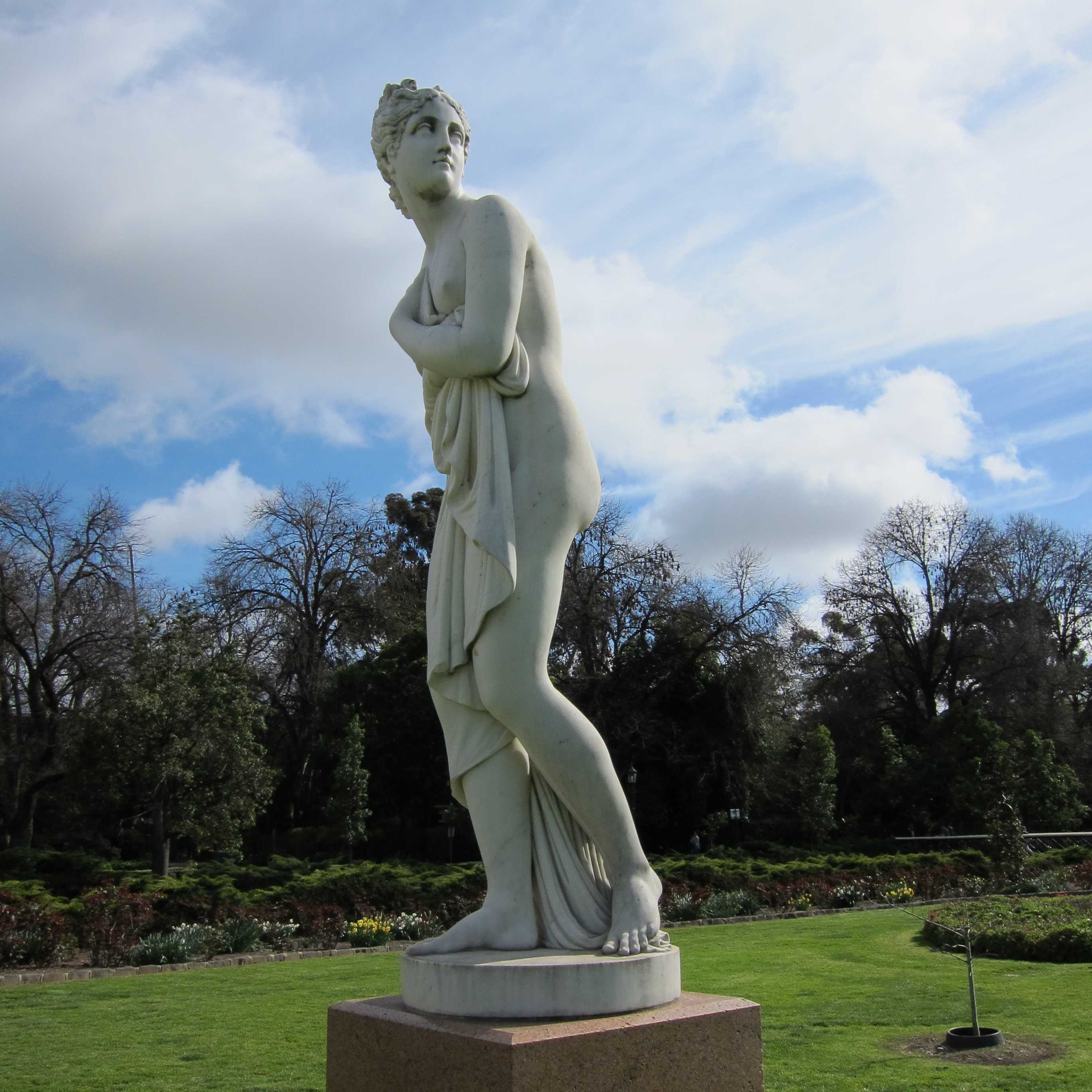
Venus (1901) presented to the citizens of Bendigo by W. M. Hunter in 1901

== Creek area ==
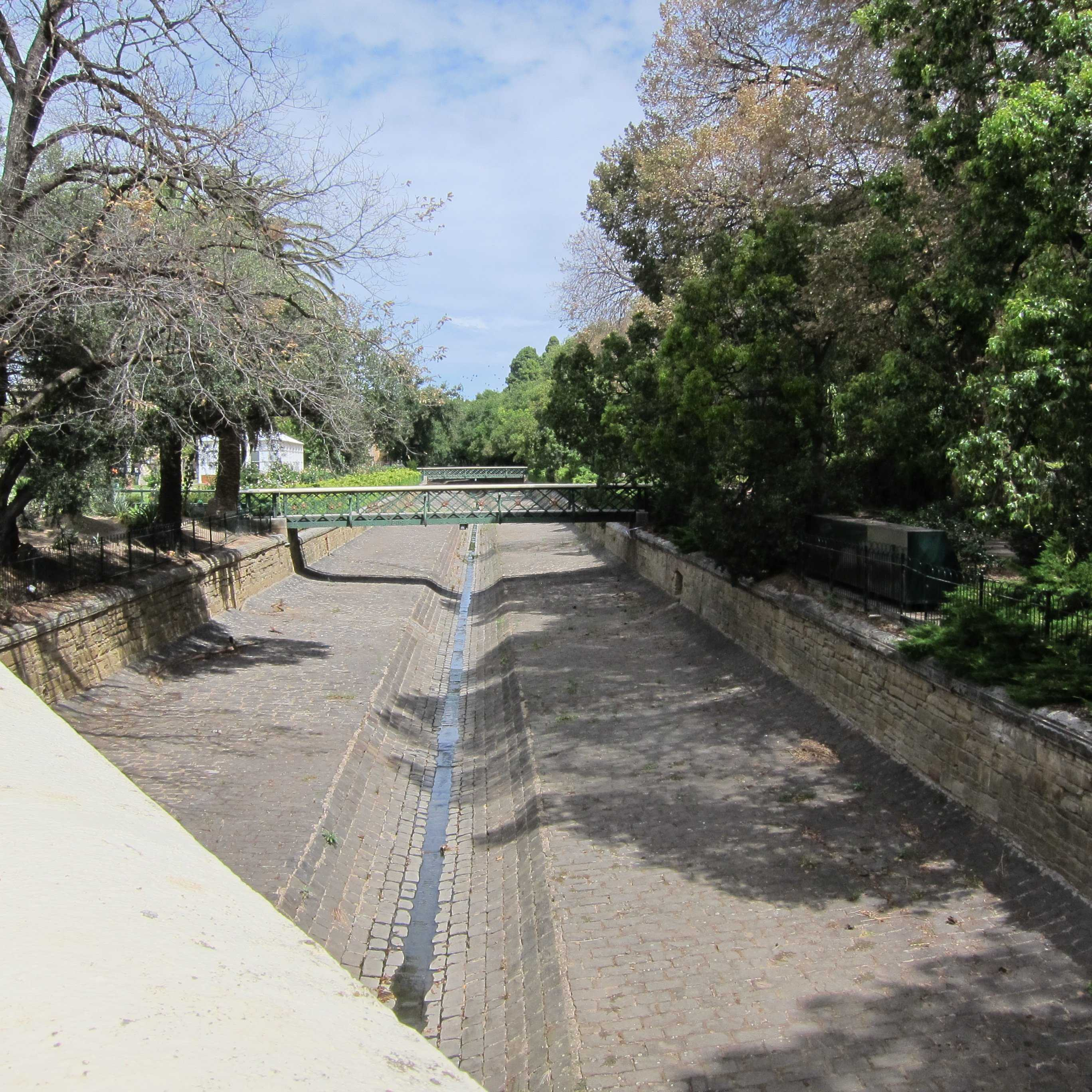
View of Bendigo Creek as it runs through Rosalind Park

In the early days of settlement the Bendigo Creek was the only practical source of water and soon became completely inadequate to service the growing population. The creek as it appears today is a direct result of a "competition" held in 1862 to find a way to transport water from the Coliban River to the goldfields. This "artificial creek" was completed in 1877 and is still in use today, although Bendigo is no longer dependent on it as its sole source of water.

The portion of the Bendigo Creek which flows through the Rosalind Park precinct reached its current form in the late 1800s and is bridged by three cast-iron bridges installed in 1882. The creek itself is lined with hand-laid flagstone and sandstone and is capped with granite. It represents the infrastructure and craftsmanship of the time.

== Fernery ==
The fernery was initially proposed in 1879 and is notable as being the last remaining fernery from this era on public land. It was constructed by filling in the existing billabong, however some of the larger trees, typically river red gums, where preserved to provide a shelting canopy for the ferns that are planted below.

== Poppet head lookout ==
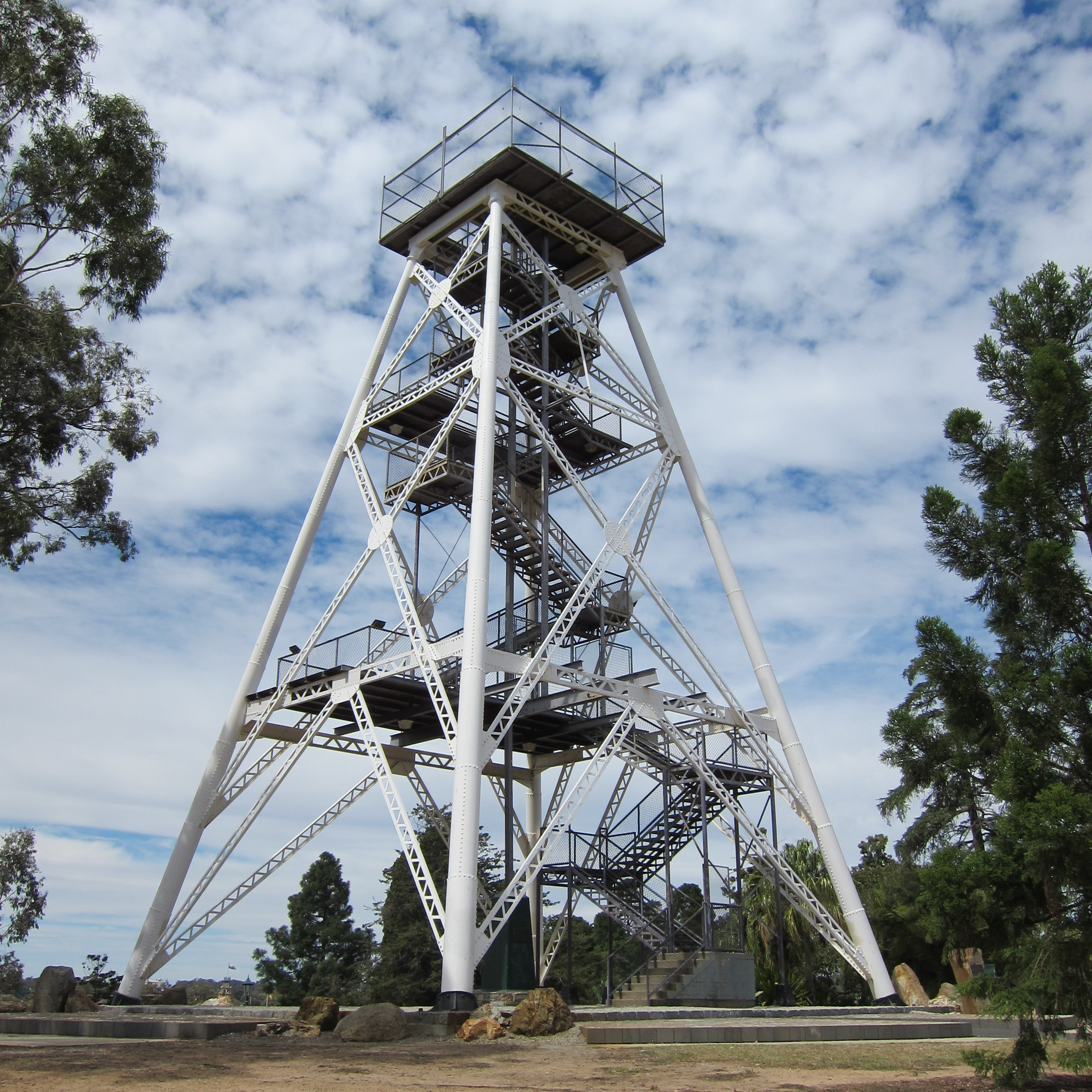
Poppet head lookout

The lookout, situated at the top of Camp Hill, was originally a poppet head from the Garden Gully United mine (one of Bendigo's richest mines) and was installed in its current location in 1931. During goldrush times, prior to the poppet head's installation, a flag was flown at the top of Camp Hill to signal that the mail had arrived in town. At this time Camp Hill was completely denuded of trees and the flag could effectively be seen from across the town.

At the foot of the poppet head lookout is the Bendigo Heritage Mosaic which was completed in 1987 and designed by mosaic artist Maery Gabriel. The installation work was completed by local volunteers. The mosaic depicts various aspects of the town's history and is designed to be viewed while looking down from the lookout.

== Cascades ==
Typical in 19th-century gardens were water features and in 1880 the "Cascades" were constructed. Designed by notable Bendigo architect William Vahland after being advised by George Lansell when he returned from a European trip. The cascades originally featured statues and fountains which may have been operating around the 1880s. It is thought that the cascades were not reliable due to the available pumps' technology being inadequate, but the historic record is not clear on this matter. The cascades fell into disrepair in the early 20th century and were effectively buried until they were partially restored in 1997.

== Queen Victoria Gardens ==
Located opposite the Alexandra Fountain the Queen Victoria Gardens are especially notable for the inclusion of an imposing statue of Queen Victoria (1903) as well as bust of Sir John Quick (1934), one of the "fathers of federation". There are also a number of notable plants and garden features in the area.

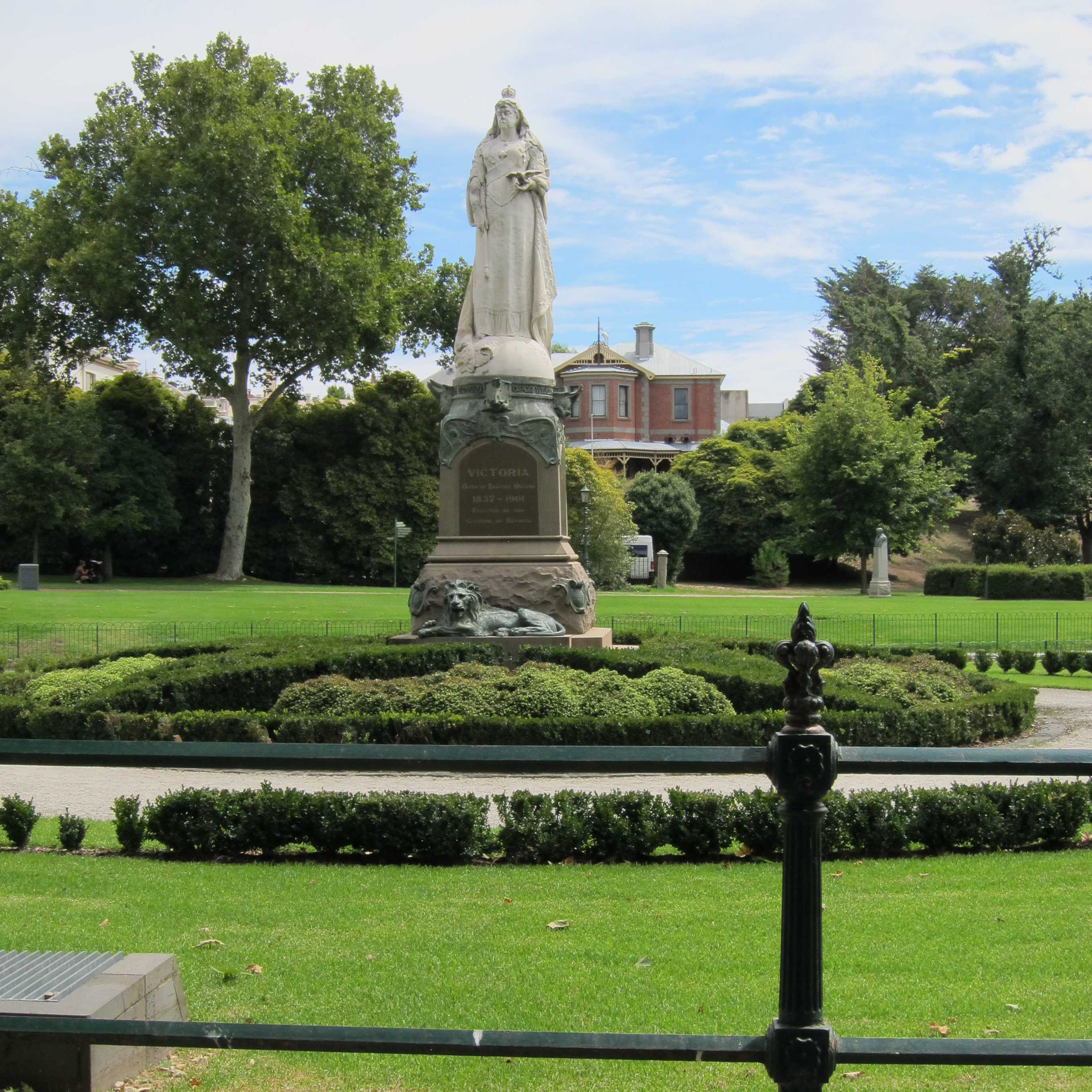
The inscription reads "Victoria" "Queen of Earthly Queens" "1837-1901" "Erected by the Citizens of Bendigo"

== Lansell Gardens ==
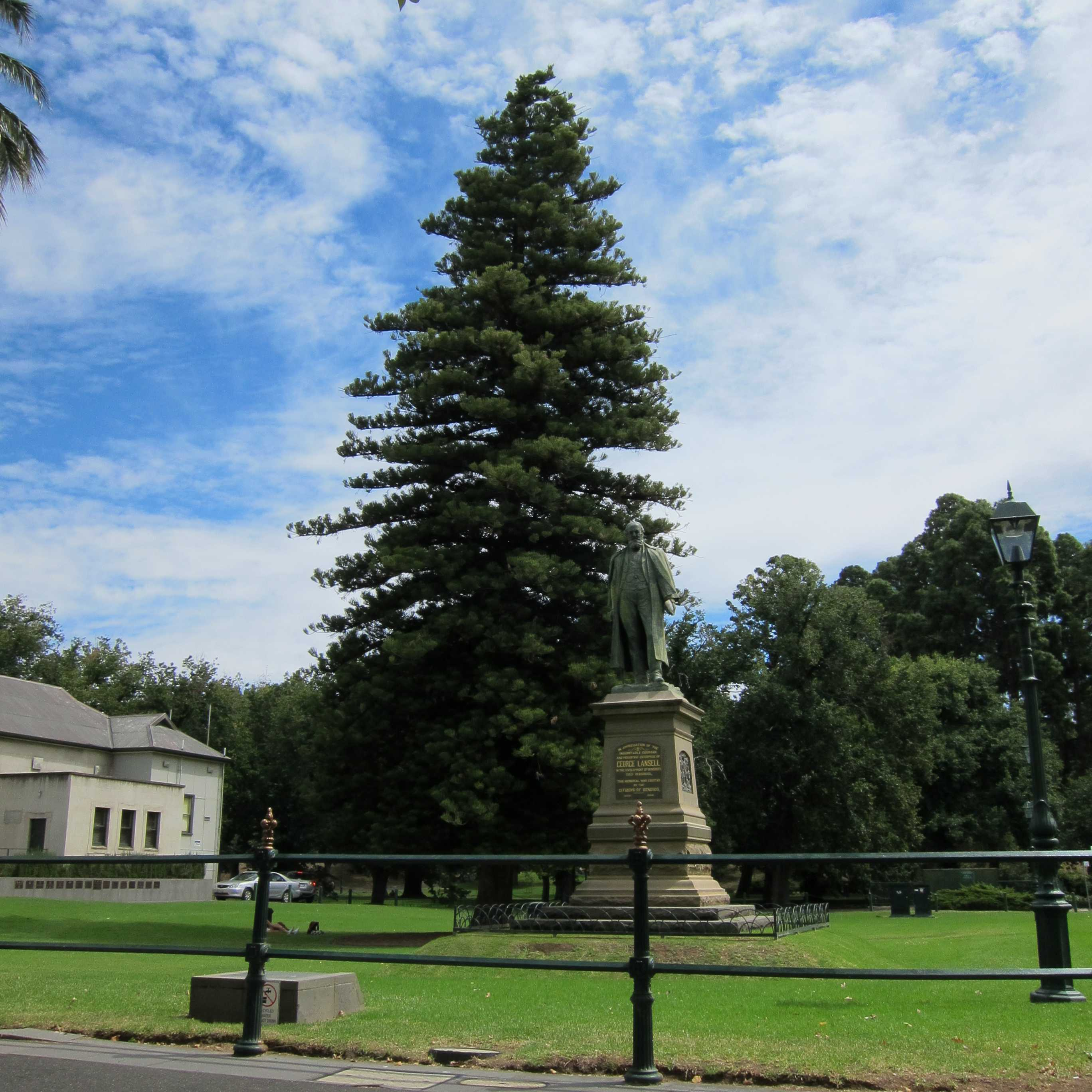
Statue of George Lansell, the "Quartz King", holding a piece of quartz in his hand

This small garden contains an imposing statue of George Lansell with a large piece of quartz held in his hand. The statue is shown right: the inscription at the base reads "In appreciation of the indomitable courage and persistent enterprise of George Lansell in the development of Bendigo's gold resources. This memorial was erected by the citizens of Bendigo. 1823 – 1906."

Lansell was one of the most famous and successful miners in the Bendigo region.

== Municipal Baths ==
The Bendigo Municipal Baths were a public swimming facility in Bendigo, Victoria, Australia, that operated from 1913 until their closure in the 1980s. Originally constructed on the site of an existing dam, the baths served as the city’s primary swimming venue until the opening of the Bendigo Olympic Swimming Pool (now Faith Leech Aquatic Centre) in 1958. The facility featured a grandstand, changing rooms, diving platforms, jetties, sunbathing decks, and a designated paddling area for children. The baths were a popular community hub, hosting swimming competitions, life-saving demonstrations, and other aquatic events. However, with the development of modern swimming facilities, the site fell into disuse, and the remaining structures were gradually removed before the area was fenced off in the 1980s.

In the 2010s, the City of Greater Bendigo initiated plans to restore the former baths site as part of the Rosalind Park Masterplan. The redevelopment converted the area into a public urban park, featuring a lakeside loop track, boardwalk, and water quality improvements through the addition of native aquatic vegetation.
