= Exley =

Exley may refer to:

== People ==
- Christopher Exley, British chemist
- Elizabeth Exley (1927–2007), Australian entomologist
- Frederick Exley (1929–1992), American writer
- Peter Exley (born 1964), British architect working in the United States
- Sharon Exley, designer, architectural partner of Peter
- Sheck Exley (1949–1994), American cave diver
- Thea Exley (1923–2007), Australian archivist and art historian
- Thomas Exley (1775–1855), English mathematician
- Zack Exley (born 1969), political and technology consultant

== Fictional characters ==
- Edmund Exley, a character James Ellroy's novel L.A. Confidential
- Josh Exley, an alien baseball player in the 1999 X-Files episode The Unnatural

== Companies ==
- Edward Exley Limited

== See also ==
- Oechsle (disambiguation)
