= Gerrans (disambiguation) =

Gerrans may refer to:

- Gerrans, Cornwall, England
- Gerrans Bay, Cornwall, England
- Philip Gerrans (born 1959), Australian philosopher
- Simon Gerrans (born 1980), Australian cyclist

== See also ==
- Gerran
