= Canberra Girls Grammar School =

Independent school in Deakin, Australian Capital Territory, Australia

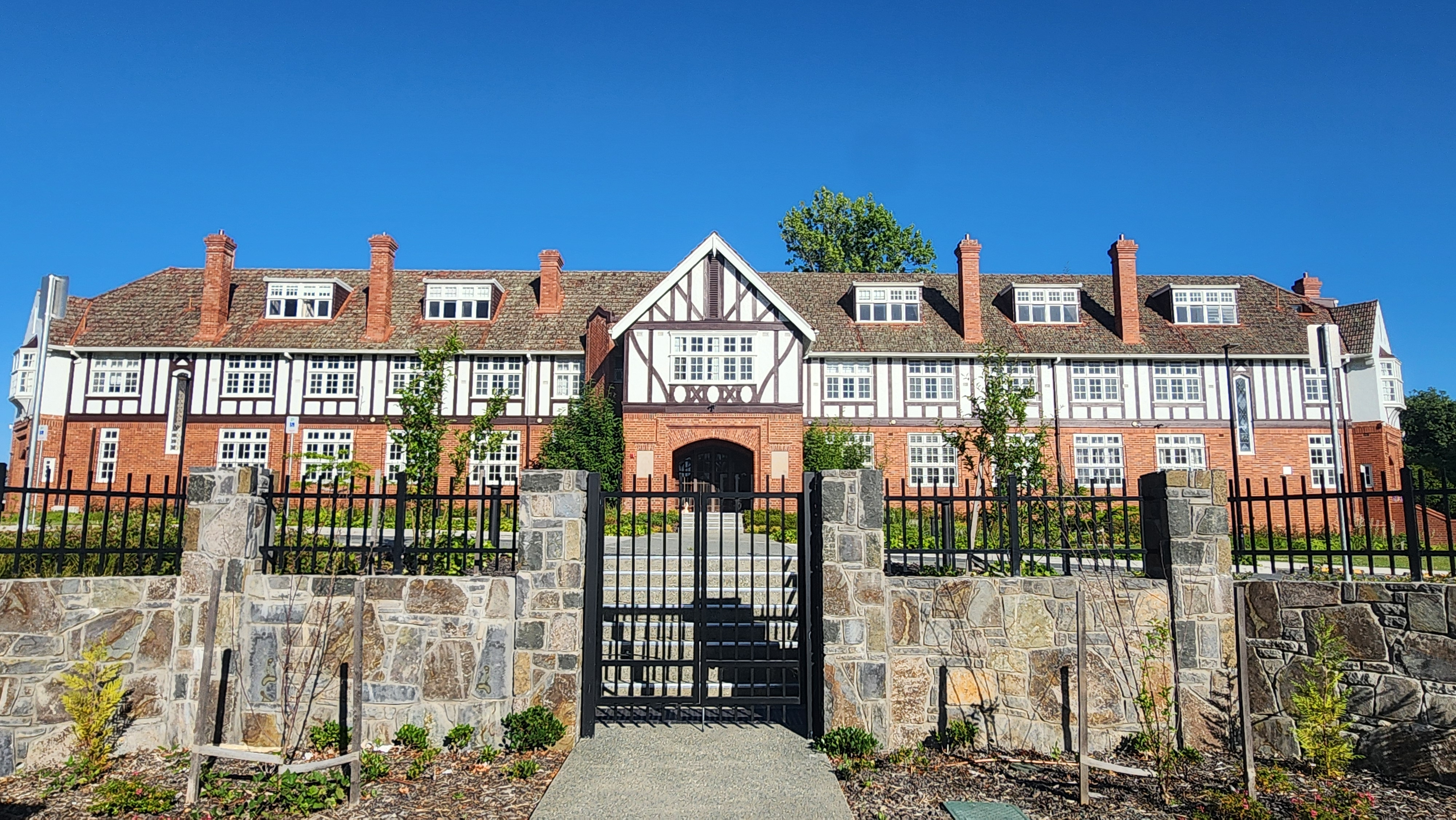
- Canberra Girls Grammar School Historical Building

Location
- Deakin, Australian Capital Territory; Australia; 35°18′59″S 149°6′53″E

Information
- Type: Independent, day and boarding
- Motto: Latin: Iuventuti Nil Arduum (To the young, anything is possible)
- Denomination: Anglican
- Established: 1926
- Chairman: Sue Hart
- Principal: Terrie Jones
- Chaplain: Christopher Lewis
- Employees: ~265
- Gender: Co-educational – Early Learning to Yr 3 Girls – Yrs 4–12
- Enrolment: ~1,300 (ELC–12)
- Colours: Green, white, and red
- Slogan: To the young, anything is possible.
- Affiliation: Associated Southern Colleges
- Website: www.cggs.act.edu.au

Canberra Girls Grammar School (CGGS) is an independent, Anglican, day and boarding school predominantly for girls, located in Deakin, a suburb of Canberra, the capital of Australia.

Established in 1926 as St Gabriel's School, by the Church of England religious order, the Community of the Sisters of the Church, Canberra Girls Grammar is the oldest private day and boarding school in Canberra. It has a non-selective enrolment policy and caters for approximately 1,300 students, with co-education from Early Learning (preschool) to Year 3, and girls only from Years 4 to Year 12. Boarding facilities are available on the Senior Campus for up to 80 students in Years 7 to 12. CGGS is also licensed to offer the International Baccalaureate Primary Years Programme and Diploma Programme (for Years 11 and 12). It is a candidate school for the MYP from Yrs 6 to 9.

Canberra Girls Grammar School is affiliated with the Alliance of Girls Schools Australasia (AGSA), the Associated Southern Colleges (ASC), the Association of Heads of Independent Schools of Australia (AHISA), the Australian Boarding Schools' Association (ABSA), and is a member of the Association of Heads of Independent Girls' Schools (AHIGS).

== History ==
St Gabriel's School was established with nine students in 1926, as a day and boarding school for girls, by the Church of England religious order, the Community of the Sisters of the Church (the Kilburn Sisters). It catered for the small but growing community in what was designated as the new Federal capital.

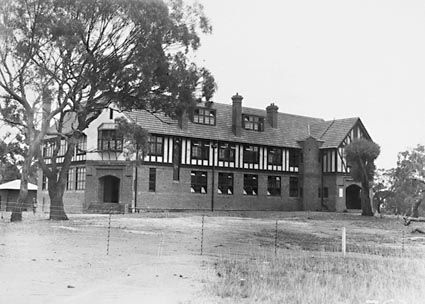
St Gabriel's School, 1928

From 1926 to early 1928, the Old Rectory of St John the Baptist Church, Reid, was leased from the Government by the Kilburn Sisters. The rectory was known as Glebe House, and was close to the city. In May 1927, the day before the opening of Parliament House, the foundation stone of the current site on Melbourne Avenue at Deakin, was laid by Lewis Radford, Bishop of the then Diocese of Goulburn. The school officially moved into its new site in 1928. In 1933, the school was renamed Canberra Church of England Girls Grammar School (CCEGGS).

CCEGGS was nearly closed down during the Great Depression, and sold some of its land in order to remain solvent. A boom period in the 1970s saw the school expand, with the Junior School moving to a new Campus in Grey Street, Deakin, to cater for a surge in enrolments. Today the junior school remains on a separate campus within the suburb. In 2001, the school name changed again, this time to its current form Canberra Girls Grammar School (CGGS). In 2004, CGGS opened an Early Learning Centre (preschool) catering for 3- to 5-year-olds on its Junior School campus.

== Principals ==
Period	Details
1934–1937	Bessie Tomson Forster
May 1937 – 1947	Una Mitchell May
1947	(Acting) Rafay Abbas
1947–1962	Isabel Masters
1962–1965	Mavis June Prater
1966–1970	Evelyn Heath
1971–1973	Donald V. Selth
1974–1979	Jennifer Shaw
1980–1984	Helen Granowski
1984	(Acting) Elizabeth McKay
1985–1999	Elizabeth McKay
2000–2004	Alyson Groom
2003–2004	(Acting) Elizabeth Gilbert
2004	(Acting) Jane Pelvin
2005–2008	Susan Just
2009	(Acting) Bruce Handley
2009–2010	Susan Just
2010	(Acting) Bruce Handley
2011–2018	Anne Coutts
2019–2021	Anna Owen
2022 Terms 1 to 3	(Acting) Julie Jorritsma
Start Term 4, 2022	Terrie Jones

== Campus ==
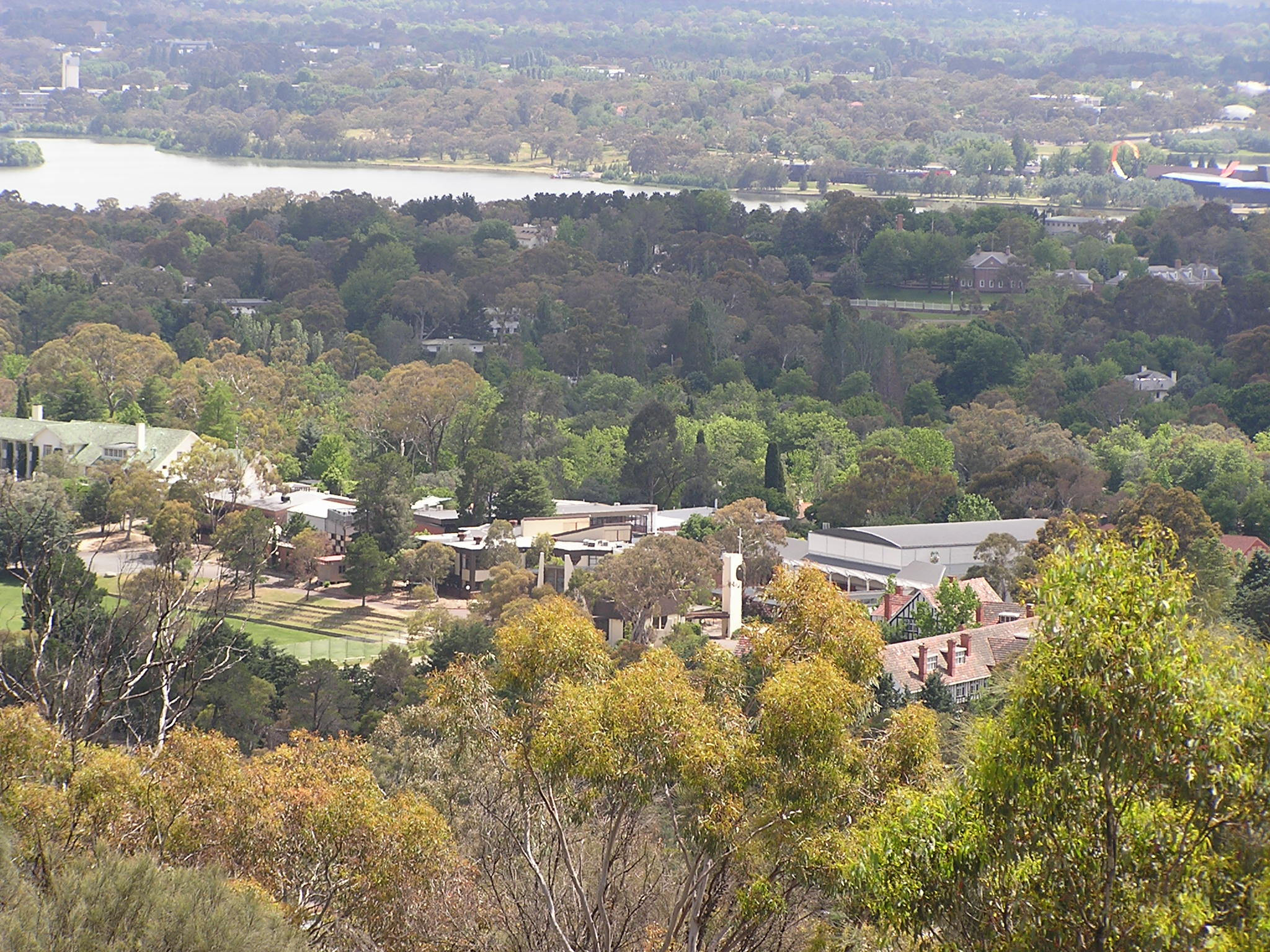
CGGS viewed from Red Hill with Lake Burley Griffin in distance

Canberra Girls Grammar School is located over two campuses (primary and secondary) in the inner Canberra suburb of Deakin, within view of Australia's Parliament House. Combined, the campuses are 10 hectares (25 acres) in size, and include an indoor heated swimming centre, gymnasia, sports courts, playing fields, an aquatic centre on the shores of Lake Burley Griffin, and buildings catering for the performing arts, art and textiles.

The School's most recent additions include a music centre with an adjoining 1,000-seat hall. 2006 saw improvements made to the junior school with the opening of six new classrooms, two music rooms and practice rooms and in 2010 the addition of a new multi-purpose hall, administration block, front office and staff offices. In the senior campus a new administration block, drive through and entrance was built in 2011 and a new award-winning science wing completed in 2012.

== Curriculum ==
Canberra Girls Grammar School was authorised to offer the International Baccalaureate World School Diploma Programme on 21 July 2010. The school was also authorised to offer the Primary Years Programme on 15 September 2011.

=== Junior school ===
The junior school curriculum is based upon the New South Wales Department of Education Board of Studies syllabus. It also has many co-curricular studies.

=== Senior school ===
Students in the senior school (Years 7 to 12) are prepared for the ACT Year 12 Certificate, as mandated by the Board of Senior Secondary Studies.

A high percentage of students who graduate with a Year 12 Certificate also obtain an ATAR and go on to study at university.

Students in Years 11 and 12 are also given the option to study the International Baccalaureate instead of the BSSS curriculum.

== House system ==
As with most Australian schools, Canberra Girls Grammar School utilises a house system for activities and competitions. The system forms the basis of its pastoral care programme. Students in the senior school are divided into six houses:

- Burgmann, named after E H Burgmann, bishop of Canberra and Goulburn from 1950 to 1960
- Deakin, named after the suburb in which the school is situated and former prime minister Alfred Deakin.
- Glebe, named after the building in which the school was first established.
- Kilburn, named after the suburb in London where the Mother House of the Order of Sisters of the Church was located.
- Robertson, named after Archdeacon C W Robertson.
- Waverley, named after the Sydney suburb of Waverley where the Mother House of the Order of Sisters of the Church in Australia was located.

Meanwhile in the junior school, there are four houses, each named after influential women in Australian history:

- Bates, named for Irish-Australian journalist Daisy Bates.
- Chisholm, named for humanitarian Caroline Chisholm.
- Gilmore, named for author and journalist Dame Mary Gilmore.
- Mackellar, named for poet Dorothea Mackellar.

== Notable alumni ==
Alumnae of Canberra Girls Grammar School are known as Grammarians and can join the schools alumni association, the Grammarians' Association (GA). The GA was formed as the Old Girls' Union in 1931 and has branches around Australia and overseas. Some notable Old Grammarians include:

Entertainment, media and the arts

- Sibylla Budd – actress
- Stef Dawson – actress
- Thea Exley – archivist and art historian
- Kate Fischer – model, Pru Goward's daughter
- Myfanwy Horne – journalist, writer, reviewer and book editor; wife of Donald Horne
- Alicia Malone – author and television host for Turner Classic Movies (TCM)
- Kate Rigby – academic
- Samara Weaving – actress, niece of actor, Hugo Weaving
- Freda Whitlam – educator and feminist
- Sally Whitwell – classical music pianist, composer, arranger, conductor and teacher

Politics, public service and the law

- Tupou Draunidalo – Fijian lawyer, Vice-President of the Fiji Law Society and daughter of former Deputy Prime Minister of Fiji, Kuini Speed
- Rt Hon Patricia Hewitt – British politician; Labour Member of Parliament (MP) for Leicester West; Former Secretary of State for Health
- Katrina Hodgkinson – politician and member of the New South Wales Legislative Assembly

Science and Technology

- Marilyn Renfree – Professor of Zoology with a research specialisation in marsupial foetal development
- Deborah Terry – Psychology researcher and Vice-Chancellor at the University of Queensland

Sport

- Ianthe Astley-Boden – rugby union player
- Zoe Buckman – track athlete who represented Australia at the 2012 Olympics
- Gemma Dashwood – paralympic swimmer who represented Australia at the 1996 and 2000 Paralympic Games
- Dimity Douglas - Olympic swimmer who made history as the youngest athlete to ever represent Australia in the Games
- Grace Kemp – rugby union player

== Notable staff ==
- Jean Appleton
- Renae Domaschenz
- Louise Burrows

== See also ==
- Anglican Church of Australia
- List of schools in the Australian Capital Territory
- List of boarding schools
- Head of the River (New South Wales)
- Associated Southern Colleges
- Sister School Canberra Grammar School
