= Stephen McDonell =

BBC News China correspondent

- Occupation: Journalist
- Employer: BBC

Stephen McDonell is an Australian journalist who has been BBC's China correspondent since 2016. He is based in Beijing. He was previously the Australian Broadcasting Corporation's China correspondent from 2006 to 2015.

== Education ==
McDonell has a Master of Arts, Journalism degree from the University of Technology in Sydney and a Bachelor of Arts degree from the University of Wollongong.

== Career ==
=== With ABC (1993–2015) ===
From 1993 to 1999, McDonell reported for the radio current affairs programs AM, The World Today and PM. He was a reporter for Four Corners, and worked with Lateline for two years.

In October 2006, he was posted to Beijing, China. As ABC China correspondent he has reported on the crash of MH17 and Uyghur Muslims in Xinjiang, among other things. The latter led to a warning to the ABC by the Chinese Embassy that there would be "wider implications" over its Foreign Correspondent report.

He also worked for The 7.30 Report and Radio National's Background Briefing.

He left the ABC in 2015. After spending Christmas with his family in Australia, he returned to Beijing and joined the BBC.

=== With BBC (2015–present) ===
Significant events McDonell has reported on with the BBC include the 2019-20 Hong Kong pro-democracy protests and the COVID-19 pandemic.

While reporting on the Hong Kong protests in 2019, McDonell's face visor was smashed by a projectile.

In January 2020, he reported on the outbreak of COVID-19 from inside Hubei province, where infections were first reported, before being quickly escorted out of the province by Chinese police. He returned to the site a year later in January 2021. During the 2021 Henan floods, as several foreign journalists at the location were confronted by angry crowds who accused them of negative portrayals of China, McDonell said on Twitter that this was a "clearly orchestrated campaign of harassment" with a focus on the BBC.

=== Awards ===
McDonell has won several Walkley Awards including one for investigative journalism in 1996, for coverage of the Asia Pacific region in 2008, and for Radio news reporting in 2008 about the Sichuan earthquake. He won a Logie Award for Most Outstanding TV News Coverage in 2008.

== See also ==
- Bill Birtles
- Matthew Carney
