= Stephen McDonnell =

Stephen McDonnell may refer to:

- Steven McDonnell (Gaelic footballer) (born 1979), Gaelic football player for Armagh
- Stephen McDonnell (hurler) (born 1989), Irish hurler for Glen Rovers and Cork

== See also ==
- Stephen McDonell, BBC News China correspondent
