= Associated Southern Colleges =

School association in Australia

The Associated Southern Colleges (ASC) is an association of independent schools in the Australian Capital Territory and southern New South Wales, Australia that share common interests, ethics, and educational philosophy, and contest sporting events among themselves.

== Current member schools ==
School	Location	Enrolment	Founded	Religious denomination	Gender	Day/boarding	School colours	School nickname
Burgmann Anglican School	Gungahlin	1,480	1999	Anglican	Co-educational	Day	Navy, white & green	Burgmann
Canberra Girls Grammar School	Deakin	1,600	1926	Anglican	Girls	Day & boarding	Green, red & navy	Girls' Grammar
Canberra Grammar School	Red Hill	2,227	1929	Anglican	Co-educational	Day & boarding	Navy blue, sky blue & gold	Grammar
Daramalan College	Dickson	1,440	1962	Roman Catholic	Co-educational	Day	Red & black	Dara
Marist College Canberra	Pearce	1,622	1968	Roman Catholic	Boys	Day	Sky blue & royal blue	Marist
Merici College	Braddon	1,000	1959	Roman Catholic	Girls	Day	Navy, maroon & gold	Merici
Radford College	Bruce	1,600	1984	Anglican	Co-educational	Day	Maroon, white, navy & sky blue	Radford
St Clare's College	Griffith	1,200	1965	Roman Catholic	Girls	Day	Maroon, white, grey & blue	Clare's
St Edmunds's College	Griffith	1,200	1954	Roman Catholic	Boys	Day	Blue, white & gold	Eddie's
St Mary MacKillop College	Tuggeranong	1,749	1997	Roman Catholic	Co-educational	Day	Teal, white & navy	MacKillop
Trinity Catholic College	Goulburn	600	2000	Roman Catholic	Co-educational	Day	Navy, maroon and gold	Trinity

== Sports ==
ASC member schools compete against one another in a variety of inter-school sporting competitions. In addition to ASC competitions, ASC member schools often participate in ACTSSSA competitions (including all schools in ACT), Northside/Southside competitions (including schools located in Northern or Southern Canberra), and other sport-specific competitions, for example ACT Junior Rugby Union and Rowing ACT (including clubs from the general public).

The sports contested in ASC competitions include athletics, basketball, cricket, cross country running, hockey, netball, rugby union, and swimming.

The sports contested in independent competitions, but which include ASC member schools include Australian rules football, dragon boat racing, hockey, rowing, rugby union, squash, soccer, tennis, and water polo.

== See also ==
- List of non-government schools in the ACT
- List of non-government schools in New South Wales
