= Merici College =

Location
- 10 Wise Street, Braddon, Australian Capital Territory; Australia; 35°16′00″S 149°08′15″E

Information
- Type: Roman Catholic private secondary day school
- Motto: Latin: Fidelitas
- Denomination: Roman Catholic
- Established: 1959; 67 years ago
- Principal: Anna Masters
- Years: 7–12
- Gender: Girls
- Enrollment: c. 700
- Colours: Blue, maroon, gold
- Affiliations: Associated Southern Colleges
- Website: www.merici.act.edu.au

Merici College is a Roman Catholic secondary day school for girls located in the Canberra suburb of Braddon in the Australian Capital Territory, Australia. Established in 1959, the College caters for students in years 7 to 12. The school's Principal is Anna Masters.

== History ==
Merici College is named in honour of Italian saint St. Angela Merici. The College is the oldest Catholic girls' school in Canberra. It was founded in 1959 as Canberra Catholic Girls' High School. The letters CCGH can be seen on the original gates at the Ipima Street side of the building. At that time, although there were several Catholic boys' schools in the area, there was no equivalent institution for female Catholic students. The founding of Merici is unusual among Catholic schools in that, rather than being established by a single order of nuns, it was originally intended as an archdiocesan school. The school was staffed by nuns from six different orders; the Sisters of Mercy, the Sisters of St Joseph of the Sacred Heart, the Presentation Sisters, the Ursuline Sisters, the Brigidines and the Sisters of the Good Samaritan. When a second Catholic girls' college opened in Canberra in the 1960s, the school became known as Braddon Catholic Girls High School.

In 1977 following a decline in enrolments it was decided to trial co-education with seven boys enrolling. The name was changed to Braddon Catholic High School. 1978 saw the largest intake of boys with 49 in total enrolling. During 1978 it was decided that the school should once again return to being a girls only school with a decision being taken to no longer enrol boys. A letter was sent out to parents of the boys already at the school suggesting that it might be preferable for the boys to enroll at Daramalan College, St Edmund's College, or Marist College Canberra. The total number of boys dwindled over the ensuing years to just four boys during 1983. It was renamed Merici College in 1983.

In 2009 the College celebrated its Golden Jubilee.

== Pastoral care system ==
Merici College has a vertical pastoral care system. This system replaces the more common Australian system of having a year coordinator assigned to each year group. Upon enrolment to the school, each student is assigned to one of six houses, each associated with one of the founding religious orders. The houses are: Penola (white, black and pink), Balgo (yellow), Brescia (purple), Ningil (red) (named for a mission in Papua New Guinea founded by Nano Nagle's Presentation Sisters), Seiwa (named after Seiwa College) (blue) and Tullow (green). Students remain in their appointed house throughout their time at the college. They are also assigned to a vertically integrated pastoral care class consisting of students from all year levels in the same house.

== Community involvement ==
Merici College has a St. Vincent de Paul Society.

Each year, Merici participates in sporting events organised by various Canberra sporting bodies. Sports that the school competes in include: soccer, softball, netball, hockey, basketball, volleyball, swimming, water polo, track and field, touch football, golf, tennis, equestrian, and snow sports. The school is affiliated with Associated Southern Colleges.

Merici College is the sister school of Marist College Canberra.

== Notable alumni ==
- Caroline Buchanan, cyclist
- Rosemary Follett AO, the first Chief Minister of the Australian Capital Territory, first woman to become head of government in an Australian state or territory.
- Gabby Millgate, actress and comedian
- Margaret Staib, former Chief Executive Officer of Airservices Australia and a former senior officer in the Royal Australian Air Force

== See also ==
- Associated Southern Colleges
- List of schools in the Australian Capital Territory
