= Myfanwy Horne =

Australian journalist, writer and book editor (1933–2013)

- Born: Myfanwy Gollan; 23 July 1933; Newcastle, New South Wales
- Died: 30 July 2013 (aged 80); Sydney, Australia
- Education: University of Sydney
- Occupations: Journalist, writer, reviewer, and book editor
- Spouse: Donald Horne
- Children: 2
- Relatives: Ross Gollan (father)
- Writing career
- Genres: non-fiction, book reviews, social commentary, biography
- Notable work: Dying: a memoir (2007)

Myfanwy Horne (23 July 1933 – 30 July 2013) was an Australian journalist, writer, reviewer and book editor.

== Early life ==
Myfanwy Gollan was born in Newcastle on 23 July 1933 to Valmai (née Clack) and Ross Gollan, her father being a political journalist for The Sydney Morning Herald. Myfanwy attended Canberra Girls' Grammar School and completed her schooling at Sydney Girls' High School. She graduated from the University of Sydney in 1951.

== Career ==
In 1953, Myfanwy Gollan joined The Sydney Morning Herald as a cadet journalist. She contributed to newspapers, magazines and books as a reviewer, columnist and social commentator. Myfanwy met fellow writer Donald Horne at a party thrown by Michael Baume in Kings Cross, Horne proposed a week later over dinner at the Chelsea, a restaurant in Kings Cross. In 1960, after marrying Donald Horne, she resigned from The Sydney Morning Herald as married women were restricted from occupying full-time positions at the newspaper.

She continued to work as a freelance journalist using her maiden name, including writing a column, For the Consumer in The Observer magazine as well as contributing essays, book reviews and restaurant reviews to various magazines and newspapers.

A politically active citizen, Myfanwy organised Struggle for Democracy in Australia 1788-1977 a historical exhibition at the Sydney Town Hall in 1977. The exhibition focused on the human rights struggles of Aboriginal people and women and the freedom of the press and religion in Australia supporting the republican movement. Together with her husband Donald Horne she was active in the constitutional reform movements in Australia.

Myfanwy took on the role of editor for Donald Horne, working on all of his books, including The Lucky Country. She co-authored and edited his final book Dying: A Memoir, completing it after his death.

== Works ==
- Horne, Donald; Horne, Myfanwy, 1933-2013 (2007), Dying : a memoir, Viking, ISBN 978-0-670-07102-9
- Gollan, Myfanwy (1992), "Reviewed any good books lately?. -In special issue: Books, Readers, Reading based on a conference at the University of New South Wales, June 1991-", Australian Cultural History (11): 111–119, ISSN 0728-8433
- Gollan, Myfanwy (1976), Kerr and the consequences : the Sydney Town Hall meeting, 20 September, 1976 / edited by Myfanwy Gollan, Widescope International Publishers

== Personal life ==
Myfanwy and Donald Horne had two children, Julia and Nick. Myfanwy died on 30 July 2013.
