= Bill Birtles =

Australian journalist

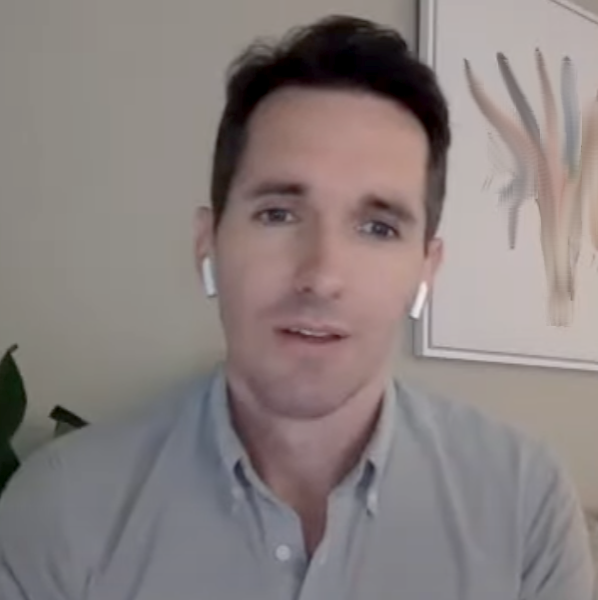
- In a Lowy Institute online discussion in 2020
- Education: Canberra Grammar School
- Occupation: Journalist
- Employer: Australian Broadcasting Corporation

Bill Birtles is an Australian journalist who is working for the Australian Broadcasting Corporation (ABC). He worked in China from 2015 to 2020, eventually leaving after the Australian embassy advised him to do so, after the detainment of Cheng Lei. He is currently the Indonesia correspondent for the Australian Broadcasting Corporation and is based in Jakarta.

== Education ==
Birtles was educated at Canberra Grammar School, leaving in 2002, and subsequently studied at the University of New South Wales.

== Career ==
Birtles started his career as a journalist working for Triple J. When he was 24, he started learning Mandarin, and moved to Beijing, working in a television newsroom there. Later, he worked for the ABC in Sydney and Melbourne. In 2015, Birtles moved back to Beijing, becoming the ABC's China correspondent.

Significant stories that Birtles has covered include the rise of Xi Jinping, the China–United States trade war, 2019-20 Hong Kong protests, early parts of the COVID-19 pandemic and the relationship between Australia and China.

In August 2020, Cheng Lei, an Australian journalist working in China was detained by Chinese authorities without charge, prompting Australian diplomats to advise Birtles to leave China. On the night before his flight out of China, seven police officers visited his apartment to tell him he was barred from leaving China. The same happened to Michael Smith, from the Australian Financial Review. The next morning, Birtles went to the Australian embassy in Beijing. After a few days, Birtles was allowed to leave China after having an interview with Chinese authorities about Cheng Lei. Afterwards, the ABC had no correspondents in China for the first time in several decades.

Birtles published a book in April 2021 about his ordeal in China, titled The Truth About China : Propaganda, patriotism and the search for answers. He had said that he is open to returning to China when its relationship with Australia gets better.

He is currently the Indonesia correspondent for the Australian Broadcasting Corporation and is based in Jakarta.

== See also ==
- Stephen McDonell
- Matthew Carney
