= Burgmann Anglican School =

School in Canberra, Australia

Coordinates: 35.188049°S 149.123366°E

Information
- Motto: Grace, Commitment and Wisdom
- Religious affiliation: Anglican
- Established: 1998
- Chair: Ms Heather Walsh
- Principal: Leonie Harwood
- Years offered: 6 months to Year 12
- Enrollment: 1661 (2023)
- Campuses: Valley Campus & Forde Campus
- Tuition: AU$18,300 per annum
- Revenue: AU$53,331,368

Burgmann Anglican School is an Anglican, co-educational, independent, day school in Canberra, Australia, servicing students aged 6 months - 18 years (year 12) split across 2 campuses in the Gungahlin region. It was named after Bishop Ernest Burgmann and has been noted as one of the best performing schools in the Australian Capital Territory according to the 2012 NAPLAN results. It is the sister school of The Affiliated High School of Sichuan University, Chengdu Number 12 Middle School.

== History ==
=== Establishment ===
The idea for the school was conceived in April 1994, when Bishop George Browning invited Ian Heyward, one of the founding members of Gungahlin Anglican Church, to explore the possibility of building an Anglican school in the Gungahlin area. Members of Gungahlin Anglican Church, which, at that time, met as a house church in the premises of Ian and Margaret Heyward, promoted the idea of the school to the local Gungahlin community by letter-box drop and interest meetings. The foundation stone was laid at the Valley Campus in Gungahlin on 14 November 1998 by Bishop George Browning, with the school opening on 9 February 1999, with an enrolment of 24 students with Dr Paul Browning OAM as first principle. The school continues to recognise its historic connection to Gungahlin Anglican Church through an agreement made between its founding Principal, Mr Paul Browning and the Church Rector at the time, Rev. Malcolm Richards.

=== 2000s ===
In 2000 the school had grown to 76 students and just a year later in 2001 they had grown to 266, the school continued to grow throughout the 2000s with the first year 7 class in 2003. In 2005 Burgmann expanded to a senior school with the first year 9 class. That same year Grace chapel opened by Bishop Browning as a shared facility with Gungahlin Anglican Church and Burgmann, the alter being designed and bult by Dr Paul Browning. In 2008 the class of 2008 graduated, making them the first year 12 cohort to graduate in the schools history.

Then in 2009, Dr Paul Browning OAM retired from his role and Mr Steven Bowers was appointed as the second principal of Burgmann. a month after Mr Steven Bowers appointed second principle, the Forde campus was opened, which initially provided second Preschool to Year 2 classes and from 2009-2011 the purpose-built Middle School was established.

=== 2010s ===
By 2011 the school had grown to 1383 students, 50.98% female (705 students) & 49.02% male (678 students). On 10 June 2011, the Paul Browning Centre and the Ian and Margaret Heyward Building were officially opened at Forde Campus. In 2011 the Middle school at the Forde campus officially opened. In 2012 Burgmann students overtook Radford collage in the NAPLAN results rankings. In 2016 (valid to 2019) both preschool services (Valley and Forde) were awarded the "Excellent" rating under the National Quality Framework, they were the 50th and 51st in Australia to receive it. In 2018, in response to high demand, Burgmann approached AIDF for funding of a 90 place Early Learning Centre (ELC) construction for the Valley campus. Construction of the new ELC the in 2019, Construction finished within time and budget.

=== 2020s ===
By 2020 Burgmann reported 1472 students enrolled at the school, 48.9% male (703 students) & 51.1% female (735 students). On 18 March 2020, Bishop Mark Short officially Opened the Early Learning Centre. on 21 September 2020, Senator Zed Seselja officially opened the new Senior School Building which was delayed from 2020 due to a "variety of reasons". By 2021 Burgmann had grown to 1534 enrolled students, 49.4% females (738 students) and 50.6% males (752 students). In 2021 Mr Steven Bowers retired and Ms Leonie Harwood was appointed as the third principle and the first female principle of Burgmann, she had her commission in 2022. In 2022 The Grevillia building opened at the Forde campus.

In 2023 Burgmann celebrated the 25th anniversary with a theme of "Year of Belonging", this celebration of 25 years included the launch of the "Voices of Burgmann" video project launch interviewing figures from Burgmann's first 25 years, including second principle, Mr Steven Bowers. In 2023 Burgmann introduced the inaugural Browning Cup, a competition between Burgmann and The Riverina Anglican College in Wagga Wagga (both opened by Bishop George Browning), Were they compete in spaces including sport, debating, chess and the performing arts. That same year the Middle School grew to 6-stream cohort. In 2024 Burgmann opened the Senior Science Centre, providing six new laboratories.

In 2026 they announced From 2027, Burgmann will expand their early years offering, introducing a purpose-built preschool facility at the Forde campus and strengthening their two year preschool program for three and four year olds while the Valley campus ELC will transition to a specialised 6 month to 2 year old centre.
