= Ross Gollan =

Australian journalist (1902–1961)

- Born: 2 October 1902; Bowral, New South Wales, Australia
- Died: 11 November 1961 (aged 59); Randwick, New South Wales, Australia
- Education: University of Sydney
- Occupation: Journalist
- Children: 4, inc. Myfanwy Horne
- Relatives: Donald Horne (son-in-law)
- Writing career
- Genre: Political journalism

Ross Francis Gollan (2 October 1902 – 11 November 1961) was an Australian journalist who was known for his work as a political reporter for The Sydney Morning Herald. He worked for the paper from 1923 until his death, and was a member of the Canberra Press Gallery from 1940 to 1946.

== Early years ==
Gollan was born in Bowral, New South Wales, to Nellie (née Sullivan) and Colin Gollan. He attended Sydney Boys High School, where he was a prefect, rugby player, and editor of the school magazine. Gollan went on to the University of Sydney, graduating with a Bachelor of Arts in 1923 and a Master of Arts in 1925. He edited Hermes, the University of Sydney Union's journal.

== Career ==
Gollan joined The Sydney Morning Herald as a cadet in 1923. He transferred to Newcastle in 1928, where he covered (among other things) the frequent industrial disputes in the Hunter Region's coal industry. Gollan was sent to Canberra in 1940 to report on federal parliament. His columns were widely read and often strongly worded, and he quickly made enemies out of two major United Australia Party figures, Robert Menzies and Percy Spender. He was a fan of Arthur Fadden, however, and was credited with having influenced Fadden's rise to power that saw him become prime minister for 40 days in late 1941. Gollan disliked Fadden's replacement, John Curtin, and by 1944 had become one of the most vigorous critics of his handling of the war. His 1945 obituary of Curtin – who had died in office – was less than sympathetic, and earned him the enmity of Curtin's Labor Party colleagues. Gollan was recalled to Sydney in 1946, and was assigned various managerial and administrative positions. He returned to writing in 1960, authoring a gossip column, "Sydney Spectator". Gollan died in Prince Henry Hospital the following year, aged 59.

== Personal life ==
On 11 November 1926, Gollan married Sylvia Stewart Russell, the daughter of literary critic Alfred Stephens. She died in childbirth on 4 January 1930, while giving birth to a daughter. On 29 April 1931, Gollan remarried to Valmai Fitzroy Clack. They had an additional three children, one of whom, Myfanwy Horne, also became a journalist and wrote for The Sydney Morning Herald.
