= Ianthe Astley-Boden =

- Born: 20 February 1975 (age 51) Sydney
- School: Turramurra High School, Canberra Girls Grammar

Rugby union career
- Position: Lock
International career
Years	Team	Apps	(Points)
2002	Australia	3	(0)

Ianthe Astley-Boden (born 20 February 1975) is an Australian former rugby union player. She made all three test appearances for Australia at the 2002 Rugby World Cup in Spain. She was named on the bench for the Wallaroos squad to face the Black Ferns in their final pool game.
