= Yang Hengjun =

Australian political blogger and novelist

- Born: October 10, 1965 (age 61); Hubei, China
- Occupations: Writer, businessman

Yang Hengjun (simplified Chinese: 杨恒均; traditional Chinese: 楊恒均; pinyin: Yáng Héngjūn born October 10, 1965), legally known as Yang Jun (杨军; 楊軍; Yáng Jūn), is a Chinese-Australian writer and businessman who is imprisoned by Chinese authorities on spying charges.

Yang was born in China and worked for the Ministry of State Security there for ten years. He then emigrated to Australia, became an Australian citizen, wrote spy novels and pro-democracy blog posts, and obtained a Ph.D. in China Studies. In 2017 he moved to the U.S. as a visiting scholar at Columbia University. He ran an online store for Chinese buyers from the U.S.

In January 2019 Yang flew into Guangzhou to renew visas for his family and was arrested by the Chinese Government. He faced one charge of espionage, but the basis of the charge was unknown. He was subsequently found guilty and handed a sentence of death with reprieve in February 2024.

== Life and career ==
Born in Hubei, China in 1965, Yang Hengjun graduated with a degree in politics from Fudan University in China in 1987. He then worked for the Ministry of State Security for ten years before he resigned. China's Foreign Ministry said Yang had never been employed by the ministry, according to a Reuters report in 2019.

After his resignation, Yang moved to Australia in 1999. He became an Australian citizen in 2002. He has claimed that he is still a Chinese citizen but Chinese nationality law does not recognise dual nationality.

Between 2002 and 2005 he wrote three spy novels in Chinese. His first novel, Fatal Weakness, is the story of a U.S.-China double agent who ultimately works for neither side but instead follows his own convictions. The novels were serialized on his blog and published in Taiwan but banned in China.

He enrolled at the University of Technology Sydney in 2005 and obtained a Ph.D. in China Studies in 2009. In his thesis, he studied the internet information warfare between the Chinese government and its critics. He started a popular Chinese-language pro-democracy blog and received the nickname "democracy peddler". During the 2008 Summer Olympics torch relay and ensuing protests, Yang called for Chinese students in Australia to show restraint, and warned that overt Chinese nationalism might create racial tensions between Asians and white Australians.

From 2010 to 2014, Yang published several books in Chinese collecting writings from his blog.

In September 2014, Yang was invited by the Chinese authorities to Beijing to attend the reception party celebrating the 65th anniversary of the founding of the People's Republic of China (PRC). In December 2014, Yang assumed the role of chairperson for the newly established International New Media Cooperation Organization (INMCO), an alliance comprising pro-PRC media globally. During his inauguration speech, Yang expressed that the primary objective of INMCO is to "tell China's story well, spread China's voice well".

Yang was a visiting scholar at Columbia University in New York for two years before being detained in China in January 2019. In the U.S., Yang spent most of his time running a "daigou" store on China's popular mobile platform WeChat, selling luxury bags, vitamins, baby formula, and watches procured overseas for buyers inside China.

Yang is married to a prominent nationalist blogger, Yuan Ruijuan (alternate: Yuan Xiaoliang). Yang is regarded as a divisive figure among overseas Chinese dissidents and activists, with some saying that Yang stopped criticising the ruling Chinese Communist Party in favour of protecting his personal and business interests.

== Detentions ==
=== 2011 ===
On 20 March 2011, it was alleged Yang disappeared from Guangzhou Airport after phoning a friend to report that three men were following him. Commentators believe that he was detained as a result of the government crackdown on activists, lawyers, and bloggers following calls for a 'Jasmine' revolution in China since February 2011. He later contacted his family in Australia saying his disappearance was all a "misunderstanding" and "I've been sick, nothing else, and my phone battery was dead for two days so I could not contact my family. I'm very sorry about stirring up so much trouble in both countries."

=== 2019 ===
On 18 January 2019, he was again detained by Chinese authorities. He had arrived in Guangzhou from the U.S. due to the imminent expiry of his family's visas, with his wife and daughter. He was awaiting Australian visas for his wife and daughter. He was arrested while on his way to the connecting flight to Shanghai.

Yang was charged with espionage in August 2019. Australian barrister Julian McMahon is said to be assisting with the case. Sentences for espionage under Chinese law range from 3 years imprisonment to death.

On 29 August 2019, Australian Prime Minister Scott Morrison told Nine News, "These suggestions that he's acted as a spy for Australia are absolutely untrue and we'll be protecting and seeking to support our citizen, as we have been doing now for some period of time."

Yang's detention was believed to relate to his international connections, according to Feng Chongyi, an academic at the University of Technology in Sydney and Yang's former Ph.D. advisor. The arrest came amid worsening Australia-China relations, with Chinese companies Huawei and ZTE being excluded from the Australian 5G technology market, Australia pushing for an investigation of the origins of COVID-19, and China imposing trade sanctions.

On 21 May 2021 the Australian foreign minister, Marise Payne, in a statement on Yang's upcoming trial, said that "despite repeated requests from Australian diplomats Chinese authorities have not provided any explanation or evidence for the charges facing Dr Yang", and called on Chinese authorities to allow access to his lawyer and to Australian consular officials in advance of his trial. A spokesman for the Chinese embassy in Canberra responded to Payne's "deplorable" comments and called on Australia to respect China's judicial sovereignty.

In a letter dictated from prison in March 2021, Yang said he has been interrogated over 300 times by many different people, sometimes while shackled and blindfolded, and as a result of his 26-month detainment he had experienced a decline in health. He also expressed the hope that he could one day return to Australia, where he might "have more chances to tell readers what's going on around the world, and what's going on in me. If I get out, I will write articles to improve Australia-China relations and that will help China to understand the world, and the world to understand China."

=== 2021 trial ===
On 27 May 2021, after 28 months in custody, Yang appeared before a closed-door court in Beijing, charged with espionage. Wearing a full protective suit, mask and goggles, despite Beijing recording no new community transmission of COVID-19 for almost four months, Yang pleaded not guilty. Australian consular officials were barred from observing the trial despite a bilateral agreement that is supposed to ensure access to court hearings involving Australian citizens in China.

On 31 May the Associated Press published Yang's account of the one-day trial as circulated amongst his friends, in which he told supporters he had asked for the judge to reject the evidence of what he had said while being tortured by interrogators. Yang also said the judge refused his request to submit evidence and call witnesses in his defense, though he agreed to attach nearly 100 pages of defense material to Yang's case file.

In January 2022 it was reported that Yang, who along with the Australian government continued to maintain his innocence, was suffering seriously deteriorating health. Observers considered it nevertheless unlikely that he would be released before his sentencing scheduled, after repeated delays, for 9 April 2022.

The Australian Broadcasting Corporation reported on 1 November 2023 that his family has written to Prime Minister Anthony Albanese to help "save" Yang.

Following multiple suspensions and delays to his trial verdict, it was announced on 5 February 2024 that Yang was sentenced to death with a two-year reprieve, which may allow Yang's death sentence be commuted to life imprisonment if he maintains good behaviour in prison. The verdict sparked an international outcry, especially from the Australian government and Yang's family who questioned the validity of the ruling in Yang's trial.

== See also ==
- Cheng Lei
- Dong Yuyu
- Hostage diplomacy
- List of Australians imprisoned or executed abroad
