= Peita-Claire Hepperlin =

Australian soccer player

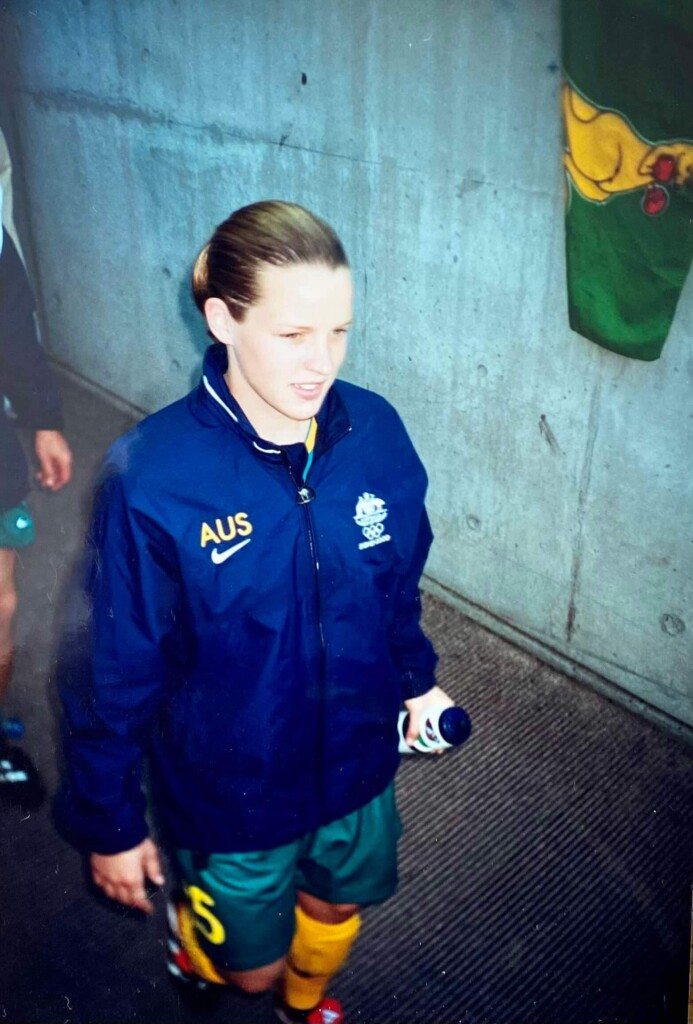
- Hepperlin at the 2000 Olympics

Personal information
- Date of birth: 24 December 1981 (age 44)
- Place of birth: Canberra, Australia
- Position: Midfielder

Youth career
- Belconnen United

International career
Years	Team	Apps	(Gls)
1999–2003	Australia	19	(0)

Peita-Claire Hepperlin (born 24 December 1981) is a former Australian football midfielder who played for the Australia women's national soccer team.

She participated at the 2000 Summer Olympics and the 1999 FIFA Women's World Cup.

Hepperlin attended Daramalan College for her senior studies, graduating in 1999.

Hepperlin currently holds a Master of Counselling degree and is a registered member of the Australian Counselling Association (ACA).

== See also ==
- Australia at the 2000 Summer Olympics
