= Trinity Catholic College, Goulburn =

Trinity Catholic College

Location
- Goulburn, New South Wales; Australia; 34°45′05″S 149°42′01″E

Information
- Former names: St Patrick's College; Marian College
- Type: Independent co-educational secondary day school
- Motto: Faith, Strength and Unity
- Denomination: Roman Catholic
- Established: 2000; 26 years ago
- Authority: Archdiocese of Canberra and Goulburn
- Affiliation: Associated Southern Colleges
- Website: trinitycollege.nsw.edu.au

Trinity Catholic College Goulburn is an independent Roman Catholic co-educational secondary day school with 714 enrolments located in Goulburn, New South Wales, Australia.

== Description ==
Trinity Catholic College is situated in Goulburn, 195 kilometres (121 mi) south of Sydney and 90 kilometres (56 mi) north of Canberra. The school was formed in 2000 with the amalgamation of St Patrick's College and Marian College. The two merged schools were eventually consolidated onto the St. Patrick's College site, the boarding school part of this consolidation only occurring in 2006, although boarding closed completely three years later. The school falls under the auspices of the Archdiocese of Canberra and Goulburn. The school's motto is "Faith, Strength and Unity".

As a Catholic school, its ethos is based on a Christian faith and gospel values. The school accepts students of all faith backgrounds, and aims to promote a sense of community, and a partnership between students, parents, and the school.

== Curriculum and co-curricular ==
Trinity Catholic College offers a range of core and elective subjects. Co-curricular activities include a variety of sports, public speaking, debating, choir, music, drama, Duke of Edinburgh’s Award, and Cadets.

Welfare and personal development is managed by a teaching staff of seventy, as well as a group of pastoral care coordinators. Staff and students are involved in the nomination and voting processes for college and boarding house leaders.

The school has experienced sporting success in Rugby Union. The greatest achievements were with the 2009 1st XV team, who were runners-up in the ACT Under 18 gold division, were southern districts champions in the Yeates Shield, and reached the fourth round in the statewide Waratah Shield, the top schoolboy competition in NSW.

== See also ==
- Associated Southern Colleges
- Catholic education in Australia
