= St Clare's College, Canberra =

St Clare's College

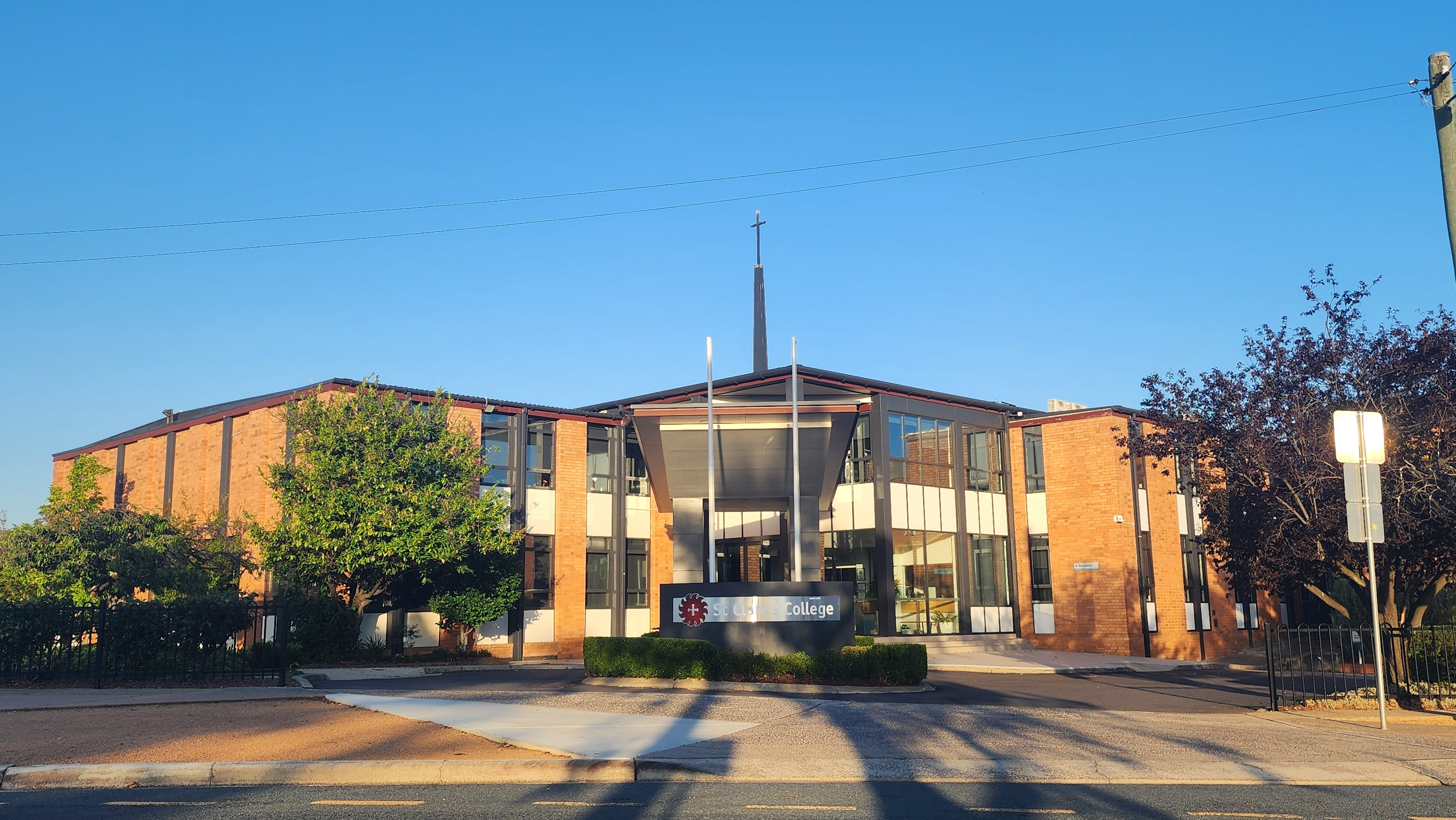

Location
- Canberra, Australian Capital Territory; Australia; 35.3236°S 149.1468°E

Information
- Type: Private secondary school
- Motto: Seek Wisdom
- Religious affiliation: Roman Catholic
- Established: 1965
- Principal: Dr Ann Cleary
- Grades: 7–12
- Campus: Griffith
- Colours: Maroon, white, grey and blue
- Affiliations: Associated Southern Colleges
- Website: https://stcc.act.edu.au/

St Clare's College is a Catholic school in the south Canberra suburb of Griffith, Australian Capital Territory, Australia, catering for girls from grades 7 to 12. The college was established in 1965. As of 2016 St Clare's had an enrolment of approximately 1000 students, making it the largest Catholic girls' secondary school in Canberra.

All students participate in a broad academic program and many extra-curricular activities within the context of the Catholic tradition.

== History ==
St Clare's College was established in 1965 as Catholic Girls' High School Griffith (CGHS Griffith).

== Principals ==
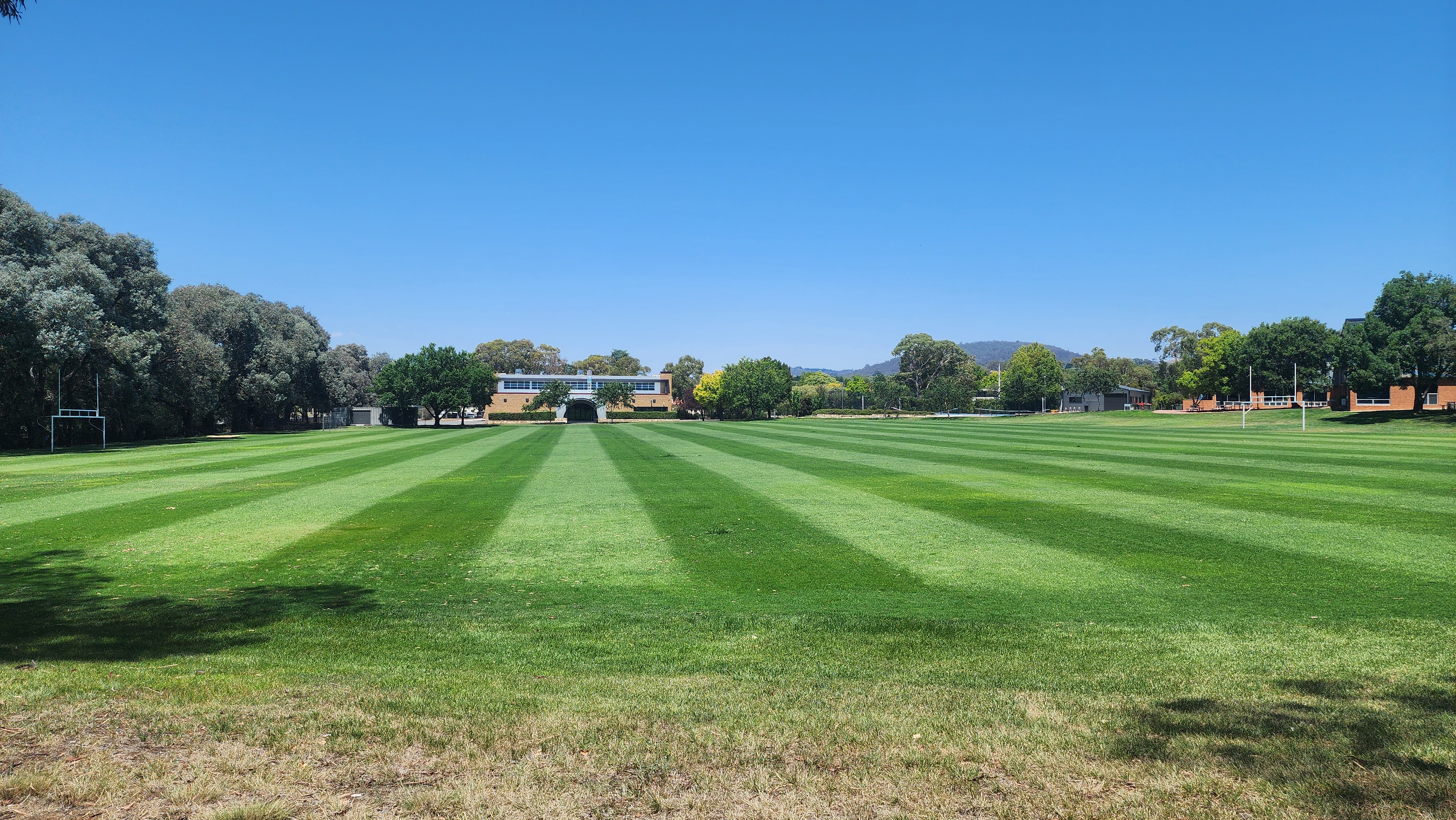
Sports' oval

- Sister Clare Slattery, Founding Principal, 1965–1975
- Sister Placid Tait SGS, 1976–1977
- Brother Gordon Kerr CFC, 1978
- Pat Wall, 1979–1983
- Sister Joan Smith CSB, 1984–1988
- Helen Sheedy, 1989–1992
- Jim Peoples, 1993–2000
- Rita Daniels, 2001–2006
- Ian Garrity, Acting, Semester 1, 2007
- Sandra Darley, Acting, Semester 2, 2007
- Rita Daniels, 2008–2009
- Alison Jeffries, 2009–2012
- Paul Carroll, 2013–2016
- Brad Cooney, 2017–2021
- Dr Ann Cleary, 2022–present

== Notable alumni ==
- Elizabeth Andrew, rugby union player
- Marie-Louise Ayres, director-general of the National Library of Australia
- Anne Castles, cognitive scientist
- Erin Thompson, South Australian politician

== See also ==
- List of schools in the Australian Capital Territory
- Associated southern colleges
