= Haze Fan =

Chinese journalist

Haze Fan (Chinese name: 範若伊; pinyin: Fàn Ruòyī)) is a Chinese journalist who works for Bloomberg News. She formerly worked for CNBC, Al Jazeera, CBS and Reuters's bureaus in Beijing. On December 7, 2020, Fan was escorted from her apartment building by plainclothes security officials. On December 11, 2020, Chinese authorities announced that Fan had been detained by the Beijing National Security Bureau, saying that her "legitimate rights have been fully ensured and her family has been notified." On June 14, 2022, China's embassy in the US told Bloomberg that Fan had been released on bail, although the agency had not made contact with her.

Before Fan's detention, She had been in contact with her friend Cheng Lei, an Australian journalist who was also detained by the Chinese government for alleged espionage. Cheng sent Fan, then a Bloomberg journalist based in Beijing, a text message stating “No growth target. GDP. 9 Min jobs target”.

In August 2024, Fan was denied a work visa by Hong Kong Immigration Department. Bloomberg News editor-in-chief John Micklethwait announced in a staff notice that Fan had been transferred to Bloomberg's London office.
