= Dong Yuyu =

Chinese journalist and editor (born 1962)

- Born: April 21, 1962 (age 64); Fushun
- Occupation: Journalist
- Years active: 1987–present
- Children: son: Dong Yifu

Dong Yuyu (Chinese: 董郁玉; pinyin: Dǒng Yùyù) is a former Chinese journalist and editor for the Guangming Daily. He was detained by the Chinese authorities in 2022 and indicted on charges of espionage the next year. He was sentenced to seven years' imprisonment in 2024.

== Early life and education ==
Dong was born in April 1962 in Fushun. He graduated from Peking University Law School with an M.L. degree in 1987. Dong has a son, Dong Yifu, who graduated from Yale University with a B.A. degree in history in 2017 and works as a journalist.

== Career ==
In 1987 after graduating from law school, Dong began working for the Guangming Daily, a Chinese Communist Party newspaper He participated in the 1989 Tiananmen Square protests and served a year of hard labor, after which he resumed work at the paper.

In 2006 he was awarded a Nieman Fellowship. In the period preceding his acceptance of the fellowship, he was aware he was under state surveillance, according to his family. In 2010 he was a visiting fellow at Keio University and in 2014 a visiting professor at Hokkaido University, both in Japan. At the time of his arrest he was deputy head of Guangming Daily's editorial department.

Dong has never been a Communist member, and his writing was generally considered to advocate progressive reform in China.

== Arrest and imprisonment ==
In February 2022, Dong was detained by Chinese authorities while lunching with a Japanese diplomat at the Novotel Xin Qiao hotel in downtown Beijing. He was formally arrested six months later and was indicted on charges of espionage in March 2023. His family did not release news of his detention until April 24, 2023, as they were concerned it might negatively affect his chances of being released uncharged. On 29 November 2024, Dong's family said that he had been sentenced to seven years' imprisonment for espionage. On November 13, 2025, Beijing's High People's Court upheld his seven-year prison sentence. The court did not provide reasons for rejecting Dong's appeal. The rejection is final under the Chinese justice system.

Dong's arrest and imprisonment were criticized by the United States Department of State, press advocacy groups, academics, and others. He was honored at the 2025 CPJ International Press Freedom Awards dinner on November 20, 2025.

On 17 March 2026, Dong was transferred from Beijing No. 2 prison to Chaobai Prison in Tianjin. The Committee to Protect Journalists criticised the decision to move him further away from his family in Beijing. In April 2026, a lung tumor was found in Dong after he was hospitalized. Dong asked for medical parole, but was denied. In August 2026, Dong underwent surgery on his lung in Beijing. On 12 October, he was ordered to resume prison labour, in a decision criticised by the Committee to Protect Journalists, which described it as "inhumane" and demonstrating a "blatant disregard for his life".

== See also ==
- Cheng Lei
- Yang Hengjun
