= Radford College =

Location
- 1 College Street; Bruce, Australian Capital Territory, None; Australia; 35.2433°S 149.0885°E

Information
- Type: private, day school
- Motto: Truth, Compassion, Wisdom
- Denomination: Anglican Church of Australia
- Established: 11 February 1984
- Sister school: Kure National College of Technology, Hiroshima, Japan Konko Gakuen school, Okayama prefecture, Japan
- Chair: Vicki Williams
- Principal: Christopher Bradbury
- Staff: 180
- Grades: Pre–K–12
- Gender: Coeducational
- Enrolment: 1 (2023)
- Colours: Gold, maroon, navy blue
- Affiliation: Associated Southern Colleges
- Website: radford.act.edu.au

Radford College is an independent school, Anglican, coeducational day school, located in Bruce, Australian Capital Territory, Australia.

Founded in 1984, the college is named after Bishop Lewis Bostock Radford. It has a non-selective enrolment policy and currently caters for over 2,100 students from pre-kindergarten to Year 12.

== History ==
Radford opened its doors in 1984 under founding principal Jock Mackinnon AM, with 235 students and 15 staff. Professor T.B. Millar AO served as the inaugural chairman. Radford presently has more than 2,100 students enrolled across its Junior (Years pre-kindergarten to 6), and secondary School (Years 7–12).

In late 2025, the college announced a tuition fee increase of over 20 per cent for the 2026 academic year, which drew local media attention and public reaction.

=== Principals ===
Years	Principal
2025–	Christopher Bradbury (formerly principal of Northholm Grammar School)
2023–2025	Andy Gordon (formerly Interim Principal, Deputy Principal Head of Junior School, currently Foundation Principal of Stromlo Forest Anglican College)
2014–2023	Fiona Godfrey OAM (formerly headmaster of St Peter's Collegiate Girls' School)
2009–2013	Phillip Heath AM (currently headmaster of Barker College)
2001–2008	David Mulford (later headmaster of Newington College)
1993–2000	Graeme Wigg
1989–1992	Peter Casson
1983–1989	Jock McKinnon AM (was appointed before the college opened, formerly headmaster of Pulteney Grammar School)

=== Chairman of the Board ===
Years	Chairman
2021–present	Vicki Williams
2017–2021	Steve Baker
2008–2017	Ian Morison
2003–2007	Ray Young
1985–2003	Lawrie Willet AO
1982–1985	Tom Millar (was appointed before the college opened)

== Curriculum ==
Junior School pupils undertake the International Baccalaureate Primary Years programme.

The Secondary School operates a core curriculum of English, Mathematics, Science, History, Geography, Religious and Values Education, and Physical education as well as various electives including Performing Arts, Creative Arts, Design and Technology, and Languages. A strong emphasis is placed upon service learning and active participation in co-curricular activities.

In Senior School, students work toward the Year 12 Certificate, a credential awarded to ACT secondary students on completion of their studies. Radford College offers a range of courses leading to an Australian Tertiary Admission Rank (ATAR), in addition to accredited courses for students not seeking to enter university. In 2011, more Radford students sought tertiary entrance than any other school in Canberra, with 93% of students receiving an ATAR. Radford College’s Year 12 graduates achieved the highest median ATAR of all ACT schools in 2004, 2005, 2006, 2007, 2008, 2010, 2011, 2012, 2014, 2015, and 2016. In 2020, the college reported a median ATAR of 90.75. In 2021, the reported median ATAR was 89.20. In subsequent years, independent outcome compilations reported median ATAR figures shifting into the mid 80s.

== Connections with other schools ==
Radford College is an active member in Round Square, with exchanges and participation in conferences and service opportunities.

Radford College is twinned with the following schools:

- Konko Gakuen school in Okayama prefecture, Japan
- Kure National College of Technology, in Hiroshima, Japan
- BISU High School in Chaoyang District, Beijing, China

== Notable alumni ==
The Radford Collegians are about building a community that provides ongoing support to members on a social, educational and career level. With over 6,500 former students, the group seeks to connect Collegians to each other and the college. It is committed to three core pillars of focus including social & community awareness, business & career opportunities and giving back. They organise reunions and mentoring programs, support College functions and raise funds for community outreach programs.

- Alistair Coe MLA – former leader of the opposition at the Australian Capital Territory Legislative Assembly
- Nicholas Bishop – actor
- Dale Brede – former Supercars Championship Racing driver
- Michael Byrne – Australian Poet
- Katherine Calder – skier and Winter Olympian
- Ryan Carters – first class cricketer for New South Wales and Victoria
- Jo Clay – member of the Australian Capital Territory Legislative Assembly
- Jessica Cottis – artistic director and chief conductor of the Canberra Symphony Orchestra
- David Dawson – first-class cricketer, a former player for the Tasmanian Tigers and NSW
- Stef Dawson – actress, known for playing Annie Cresta in the Hunger Games film franchise
- Anna Flanagan – hockey player for the Hockeyroos
- Ceridwen Fraser - Biogeographer – Professor of Marine Science at the University of Otago
- Jane Garrett – Mayor of Yarra and a Member of the Victorian Legislative Assembly and the Victorian Legislative Council.
- Chloe Hosking – racing cyclist, competing in UCI championship
- Elanor Huntington – Dean of Engineering at the Australian National University
- Nick Kyrgios – tennis player
- Luke Letcher – Olympic bronze medallist, Australian men's quadruple scull
- Sam Michael – Formula One engineer, former director at McLaren F1 and Williams F1
- Kaz Patafta – soccer player for Lanexang United F.C.
- Tom Rogic –former Socceroo, Futsalroo, Nike 'The Chance' winner, and professional soccer player for Celtic in the Scottish Premier League
- Allan Sly – probability theorist, professor of mathematics at Princeton University, 2018 MacArthur Fellow
- Jesse Wagstaff – professional basketball player for the Perth Wildcats

== Notable faculty ==
- John Foulcher, Australian poet

== Former National Sporting Staff ==
- Edwina Bone - Australian National Women's Hockey Team (formerly)
- Tristan Thomas, Australian hurdler (formerly)

== See also ==
- List of schools in the Australian Capital Territory
- Associated Southern Colleges
