= Cheng Lei (journalist) =

Chinese-born Australian journalist

- 成蕾
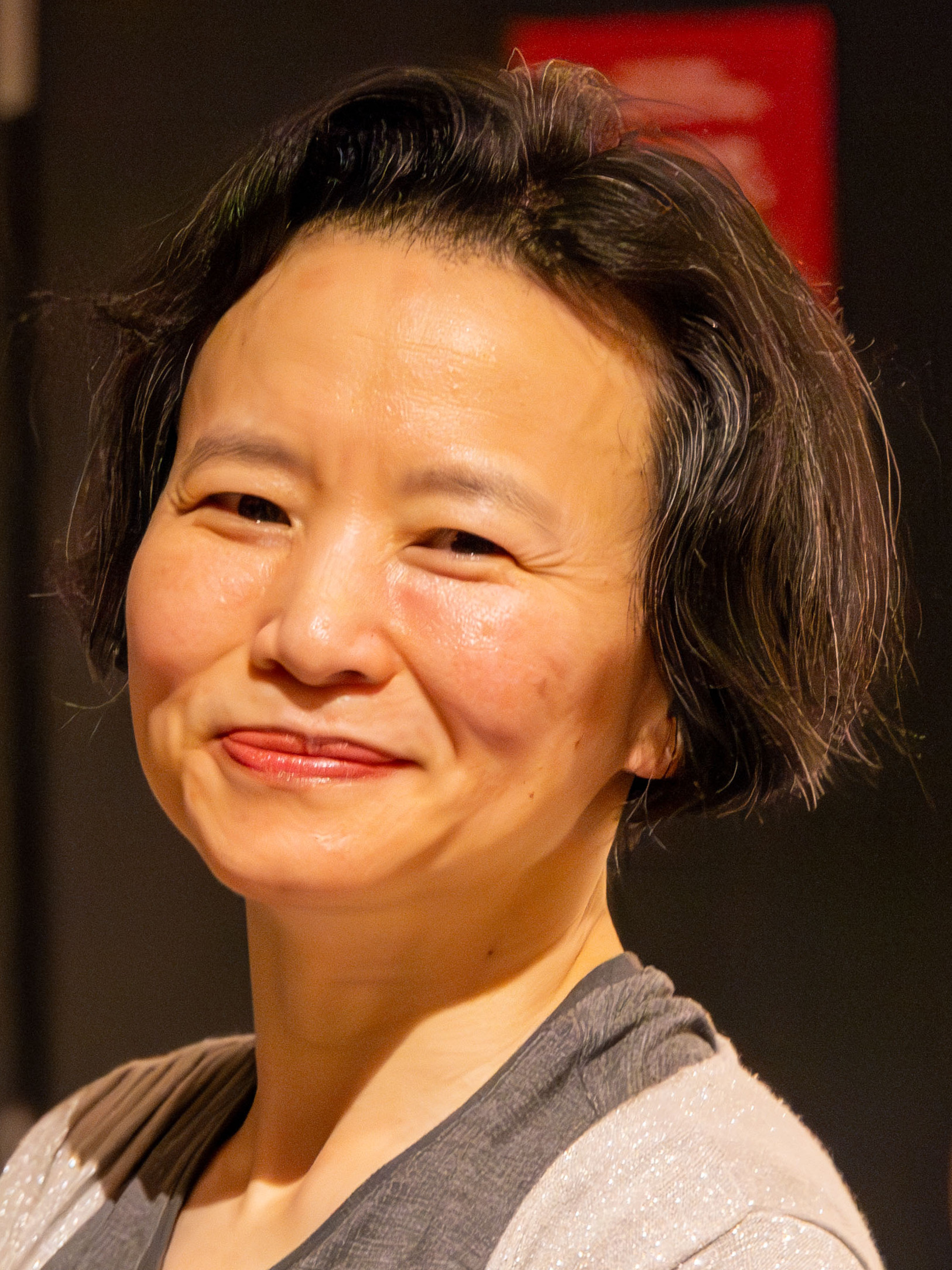
- Cheng Lei in 2023
- Born: June 1975 (age 51); Yueyang, Hunan, China
- Citizenship: Australian
- Education: University of Queensland
- Occupations: Journalist, News anchor
- Employer(s): CGTN, CNBC, Sky News Australia
- Criminal charges: Endangering national security
- Children: 2

Cheng Lei (Chinese: 成蕾; pinyin: Chéng Lěi; born June 1975) is a Chinese-born Australian television news anchor and business reporter. She served as a prominent news anchor for Chinese state owned English-language news channel China Global Television Network (CGTN) in Beijing from 2012 to 2020 and also hosted the Global Business program which airs on CGTN. She had previously worked for nine years as CNBC's China correspondent. Currently, she is a presenter and columnist at Sky News Australia.

In September 2020, after she had been detained by Chinese authorities in mid-August, a government official said Cheng Lei was "suspected of carrying out criminal activities endangering China's national security", but no details about the accusations were provided. The International Federation of Journalists said her detention was "without cause or reason" and "deeply concerning". Cheng was formally arrested in February 2021 "on suspicion of illegally supplying state secrets overseas", according to a statement from Australia's foreign minister Marise Payne. Cheng was released and returned to Australia in October 2023.

== Early life and education ==
Cheng Lei was born in Yueyang, Hunan province, China, in 1975. In 1985, at the age of 10, she migrated to Melbourne with her family so that her father could pursue a PhD program.

In 1992, Cheng began a Bachelor of Commerce at the University of Queensland, graduating in 1995. Cheng is a certified practising accountant and accredited Chinese-English translator. Cheng has said she wanted to be a journalist rather than an accountant, but was encouraged into accounting by her father. He questioned whether an Australian TV station would hire a Chinese reporter and said accounting would ensure her employability.

== Career ==
In 1995, Cheng started her career in Australia as an accountant for Cadbury Schweppes and she later worked as a business analyst for ExxonMobil in 2000. Between 2000 and 2001, she moved to Shandong, China to work as a business analyst with transport company Luneng Finemore Logistics.

After showing dissatisfaction over her career in finance, she pursued a career as a television reporter in China. In 2002, after a screen test at CGTN's predecessor CCTV, she was hired as an intern and was an on-air presenter three months later. She then worked in Shanghai and Singapore for nine years as CNBC's China correspondent, starting in 2003. In 2012, she returned to work at CCTV in Beijing.

She has hosted numerous events including the Australia China Business Awards 2013, the APEC Women Leadership Forum 2014, and the Norway Asia Business Summit 2019. She was a guest on Q&A, an Australian television panel discussion program, in 2014.

Cheng has reported on major events in China such as Beijing's 2008 Summer Olympics and Shanghai's 2010 World Expo. She has interviewed high-profile figures such as Bill Gates, José Manuel Barroso, John W. Snow, Rodrigo Rato and Richard Branson.

In a satirical 2018 video for CGTN about the China–United States trade war, Cheng sarcastically thanked US President Donald Trump for all the things he had done for China. According to an article in the South China Morning Post, it was "one of the few occasions that state media has personally targeted the US president since the start of the trade war, with most reports taking a less confrontational tone." On 22 August 2018, the video was removed from CGTN's official YouTube and Twitter accounts, hours before Chinese and American representatives met in Washington to discuss the trade war.

== Detention ==
On 14 August 2020, the Government of Australia received a formal notification regarding the detention of Cheng Lei in China, which was later confirmed in a statement by the Australian Minister for Foreign Affairs Marise Payne. Australian public news broadcaster ABC reported that she was being held under "residential surveillance", which allows the Chinese officials and authorities to keep detainees in secret custody for a period of up to six months without charge, and deny visits by family members or lawyers. Australia's foreign ministry did not confirm ABC's report. Australian diplomats talked to Cheng via video link on 27 August.

She was held nearly two weeks before official news regarding her detention broke out in the media. After the news emerged regarding her detention, CGTN apparently removed the biography and details of Cheng from its official website. Her detention also further escalated the tensions between Australia and China.

On 31 August, the Committee to Protect Journalists called on authorities in China to disclose their reasons for detaining Cheng or release her immediately. The International Federation of Journalists said the detention of Cheng was "without cause or reason" and "deeply concerning". Elaine Pearson, the head of Human Rights Watch Australia, also said her detention was "very concerning". Pearson described Cheng's arrest as a possible instance of hostage diplomacy. The Guardian and some Australian media outlets have drawn parallels with the seizure of Canadians Michael Kovrig and Michael Spavor in December 2018 that occurred after Canada arrested Huawei CFO Meng Wanzhou. Minister Payne stated in a radio interview that the idea Cheng was being used as a pawn in the deteriorating relationship between the two countries was "speculative at best".

At a 1 September press briefing, China's Ministry of Foreign Affairs spokeswoman Hua Chunying said she had "no specific information" about Cheng's case. Another spokesperson, Zhao Lijian, told reporters on 8 September that Cheng Lei was "suspected of carrying out criminal activities endangering China's national security". Zhao did not provide any details about the accusations. Two Australian journalists based in China, Bill Birtles of the Australian Broadcasting Corporation and Michael Smith of the Australian Financial Review, were investigated by China's state security police due to Cheng Lei's case.

On 12 December 2020, the European Union appealed to the Beijing National Security Bureau to release "all those arrested and detained in connection with their reporting activity", including Haze Fan of Bloomberg News and Cheng Lei, or grant them access to defense attorneys according to international law.

In February 2021, Marise Payne announced that Cheng had been formally arrested in China "on suspicion of illegally supplying state secrets overseas". After being detained in August 2020, Cheng was arrested on 5 February 2021. According to her family, Cheng was interrogated several times and her health had deteriorated.

On 31 March 2022, after 19 months of detention, Beijing No.2 People's Intermediate Court heard Cheng Lei's case in a secret session. Australia's ambassador Graham Fletcher was denied access to the court due to the case involving "national security".

In June 2022, Xiao Qian, the Chinese ambassador to Australia, denied that Cheng was a political prisoner, and described the detention as an "individual case" which "should not be a problem" affecting China-Australia relationship.

=== 1,000th Day of Incarceration ===
In April 2023, Chinese authorities pushed Cheng Lei's sentencing date by another three months; the fifth such delay. Speaking in London on 2 May 2023, where he was attending the coronation of King Charles III, Australian prime minister Anthony Albanese noted that the 1,000th day of Cheng's incarceration was approaching on 9 May. In an interview with Piers Morgan, Albanese stated: "Our position on China has been to engage constructively but to continue to put forward that the impediments to trade should be removed, to say very directly to President Xi, that Australians such as Cheng, need to be given proper justice, and that they're not receiving that at the moment." Nick Coyle, Cheng's partner, made repeated pleas for the Australian government to link the country's improving trade ties with China directly to the plight of Cheng and fellow Australian detainee Yang Hengjun.

=== Release ===
On 11 October 2023, Australian Prime Minister Anthony Albanese announced that Cheng had been released and had returned to Australia. She arrived at Melbourne Airport where she was met by Australian Foreign Minister Penny Wong.

After her release she did an interview with ABC's 7.30 where she said she was exposed to a "sophisticated form of torture" while in detention.

In June 2024, Australian Prime Minister compared Julian Assange's release to that of Cheng Lei and economist Sean Turnell, who was taken prisoner by Myanmar's military government for 650 days. The comparison caused a stir among the Australian opposition.

== Personal life ==
Cheng became an Australian citizen in 2003, and is bilingual in English and Mandarin. She has two children.

== See also ==
- Dong Yuyu
- Yang Hengjun
