= Kate Rigby =

Australian philosopher and literary scholar

Catherine Elizabeth Rigby FAHA (born 1960 in Canberra, Australia) is a scholar in the interdisciplinary field of environmental humanities.

== Early life ==
Kate Rigby was born and grew up largely in Canberra, where she attended St John's Primary School, Red Hill Primary School, and the Canberra Church of England Girls' Grammar School, graduating as Dux of the School in 1977.

She undertook tertiary studies at the University of Melbourne (BA Hons, 1982, and MA, 1986) and Monash University (PhD, 1990). In addition, she spent a year at the University of Freiburg on a DAAD postgraduate scholarship (1982–83) and a year at the University of Paderborn on an Alexander von Humboldt postdoctoral fellowship, where she was mentored by Germany's first Professor of Women's Studies, Gisela Ecker (1994).

== Career ==
Rigby began her academic career in German Studies and General and Comparative Literature at Monash University, where she became a board member of the Centre for Theology and Religious Studies in the School of Historical Studies (1996–2015), director of the Centre for Comparative Literature and Cultural Studies (2004–2007), deputy head (education) of the School of English, Communications and Performance Studies (2009–2011), and member of the Education for Sustainability Advisory Group (2013–2015). In 2005, she was elected as Fellow of the Australian Academy of the Humanities, in recognition of her international standing as an ecocritical scholar in German and Comparative Literature. At Monash, where she remains an adjunct professor, she developed courses in ecocritical literary and cultural studies and (in collaboration with the medieval historian of religion, Constant Mews), in religious studies. In 2013 was appointed to one of the world's first professorships in environmental humanities at Monash University. In 2016, she was appointed to the inaugural directorship of the Research Centre for Environmental Humanities and of an associated taught master's and PhD programme in environmental humanities at Bath Spa University.

In 2021, Rigby was awarded an Alexander von Humboldt Professorship to pursue transformative research in Environmental Humanities at the University of Cologne, where she leads a research hub for Multidisciplinary Environmental Studies in the Humanities.

== Research ==
Rigby's research lies at the intersection of environmental literature, philosophical, historical and religious studies, with a special interest in European Romanticism, ecopoetics, multispecies studies, decolonial studies and disaster studies.

In 1999, she joined the Australian National Working Group on the Ecological Humanities, and the following year, she co-founded with Freya Mathews and Sharon Pfueller the journal of ecological thought and praxis, Philosophy Activism Nature. She subsequently became the inaugural President of the Association for the Study of Literature, Environment and Culture (Australia-New Zealand) (2004), the founding convenor of the Australia-Pacific Forum on Religion and Ecology (2011), a key researcher with the Humanities for the Environment Mellon Australia-Pacific Observatory (2013), and a member of the Luce Foundation-funded research network "Facing the Anthropocene: Rethinking Humanity's Place in the World" project, led by Duke University's Kenan Institute for Ethics. She has also held research fellowships at the Freiburg Institute for Advanced Studies (2015 and 2021), and at the Rachel Carson Center for Environment and Society of LMU Munich (2020).

== Selected publications ==
- Reclaiming Romanticism: Towards an Ecopoetics of Decolonization, London: Bloomsbury Academic, 2020.
- Dancing with Disaster: Environmental Histories, Narratives, and Ethics for Perilous Times, Charlottesville: University of Virginia Press, 2015. (Awarded Choice Outstanding Academic Title from the American Library Association, 2015)
- Ecocritical Theory: New European Perspectives, co-edited with Axel Goodbody, Charlottesville: University of Virginia Press, 2011.
- Topographies of the Sacred: The Poetics of Place in European Romanticism, Charlottesville: University of Virginia Press, 2004.
- Ecology, Gender and the Sacred, co-edited with Constant Mews. Clayton: Centre for Studies in Religion and Theology, Monash University, 1999.
- Transgressions of the Feminine. Tragedy, Enlightenment and the Figure of Woman in Classical German Drama, Heidelberg: Winter, “Reihe Siegen”, 1996.
- (With Silke Beinssen-Hesse) Out of the Shadows. Contemporary German Feminism, Melbourne: Melbourne University Press, “Interpretations” series, 1996.
