= Philip Gerrans =

Australian cricketer and academic

Personal information
- Full name: Philip Simon Gerrans
- Born: 14 October 1959 (age 67); Melbourne, Victoria, Australia
- Batting: Right-handed
- Bowling: Right-arm medium

Domestic team information
- Years: Team
- 1990–1991: Oxford University

Career statistics
Competition	First-class
Matches	12
Runs scored	137
Batting average	12.45
100s/50s	0/0
Top score	39
Balls bowled	1,713
Wickets	17
Bowling average	59.00
5 wickets in innings	0
10 wickets in match	0
Best bowling	3/86
Catches/stumpings	4/–
- Source: Cricinfo, 12 July 2020

Philip Simon Gerrans (born 14 October 1959) is an Australian academic and philosopher, and a former first-class cricketer.

== Education and cricket career ==
Gerrans was born in Melbourne and attended Daramalan College in Canberra and the Australian National University. He played several matches for the Australian Capital Territory cricket team in the 1980s, including matches against Test touring teams from New Zealand, Sri Lanka and the West Indies.

Gerrans studied philosophy, politics and economics as a mature student in England at Worcester College at the University of Oxford. While studying at Oxford, he played first-class cricket for Oxford University in 1990 and 1991, making eleven appearances. He scored 130 runs in his eleven matches, at an average of 14.44 and a high score of 39. With his right-arm medium pace bowling, he took 14 wickets at a bowling average of 66.14, with best figures of 3 for 86. He also made a single first-class appearance for a combined Oxford and Cambridge Universities team against the touring New Zealanders in 1990, taking three wickets.

== Philosophy career ==
After graduating from Oxford, Gerrans returned to Australia where he studied for his doctorate at the Australian National University under the supervision of Frank Jackson and Philip Pettit. Once his studies were complete, Gerrans moved into academia. He is a philosophy professor at the University of Adelaide and an associate of the Swiss Center for Affective Sciences.

Gerrans has published more than 50 research papers, with a particular interest in what psychological disorder reveals about the mind. He is the author of the book The Measure of Madness: Philosophy of Mind, Cognitive Neuroscience, and Delusional Thought (MIT Press, 2014). With Chris Letheby, he is the co-editor of the book Philosophical Perspectives on Psychedelic Psychiatry (OUP, 2024).
