= The Lucky Country =

Book by Donald Horne

- First edition
- Author: Donald Horne
- Language: English
- Genre: Non-fiction
- Publication date: December 1964
- Publication place: Australia
- Media type: Print (hardback)
- Pages: 288
- ISBN: 978-0143180029

The Lucky Country is a 1964 book by Donald Horne. The title has become a nickname for Australia and is generally used favourably, although the origin of the phrase was negative in the context of the book. Among other things, it has been used in reference to Australia's natural resources, weather, history, its early dependency of the British system, distance from problems elsewhere in the world, and other sorts of supposed prosperity.

Horne's intent in writing the book was to portray Australia's climb to power and wealth based almost entirely on luck rather than the strength of its political or economic system, which Horne believed was "second rate". In addition to political and economic weaknesses, he also lamented on the lack of innovation and ambition, as well as a philistinism in the absence of art, among the Australian population, viewed by Horne as being complacent and indifferent to intellectual matters. He also commented on matters relating to Australian puritanism, as well as conservatism, particularly in relation to censorship and politics.

== Overview ==
The title of Horne's book comes from the opening words of the book's last chapter:

Australia is a lucky country run mainly by second rate people who share its luck. It lives on other people's ideas, and, although its ordinary people are adaptable, most of its leaders (in all fields) so lack curiosity about the events that surround them that they are often taken by surprise.

Horne's statement was an indictment of 1960s Australia. His intent was to comment that, while other industrialised nations created wealth using clever means such as technology and other innovations, Australia did not. Rather, Australia's economic prosperity was largely derived from its rich natural resources and immigration. Horne observed that Australia "showed less enterprise than almost any other prosperous industrial society".

In his 1976 follow-up book, Death of the Lucky Country, Horne clarified what he had meant when he first coined the term:

When I invented the phrase in 1964 to describe Australia, I said: "Australia is a lucky country run by second rate people who share its luck." I didn't mean that it had a lot of material resources … I had in mind the idea of Australia as a [British] derived society whose prosperity in the great age of manufacturing came from the luck of its historical origins … In the lucky style we have never "earned" our democracy. We simply went along with some British habits.

In the decades following his book's publication, Horne became critical of the "lucky country" phrase being used as a term of endearment for Australia. He commented, "I have had to sit through the most appalling rubbish as successive generations misapplied this phrase."

== Legacy ==
The book was published in December 1964, with The Australian newspaper publishing a series of excerpts starting from 2 December. It became a phenomenon at its publication, despite some initially critical reviews. One commentator remarked that the release of the book was like "A bucket of cold saltwater emptied onto the belly of a dreaming sunbather". Writing in 2007, Raewyn Connell called it "the first pop-sociology best-seller" in Australia.

It was published at a time when criticism of Australia, which had experienced an ascension to wealth and prosperity in a relatively short history (the country was federated in 1901), was rife. It is not the only book to shine an unfavourable light on the country: Robin Boyd's The Australian Ugliness was released four years earlier in 1960 and is considered a seminal work on Australian architecture. Boyd's book was an indictment on the taste of Australian suburbanites, and the aesthetic of the Australian suburbs, which he lamented was in a deplorable state, full of European imitation styles fused together to make one whole.

Horne's book was given an unofficial sequel in 2016, with Ian Lowe's The Lucky Country? Reinventing Australia. Lowe's book addresses Horne's stance, and states that due to poor leadership, little has changed since The Lucky Country.

With regard to economic innovation, Australia still ranks relatively low compared with other developed nations: in 2014 The Economist's Economic Innovation Index ranked Australia 22nd, behind Japan, the US, Germany and Sweden.

== See also ==
- Cultural cringe
- History of Australia
