= Donald Horne =

Australian journalist and academic

Donald Horne AO
- Born: Donald Richmond Horne; 26 December 1921; Kogarah, New South Wales, Australia
- Died: 8 September 2005 (aged 83); Sydney, New South Wales, Australia
- Education: Canterbury Boys High School; University of Sydney
- Occupations: Journalist, writer, social critic, academic
- Spouse: Myfanwy Horne
- Children: 2
- Relatives: Ross Gollan (father-in-law)
- Writing career
- Years active: 1939–2003
- Genres: Non-fiction, fiction, social commentary, autobiography
- Notable work: The Lucky Country (1964)

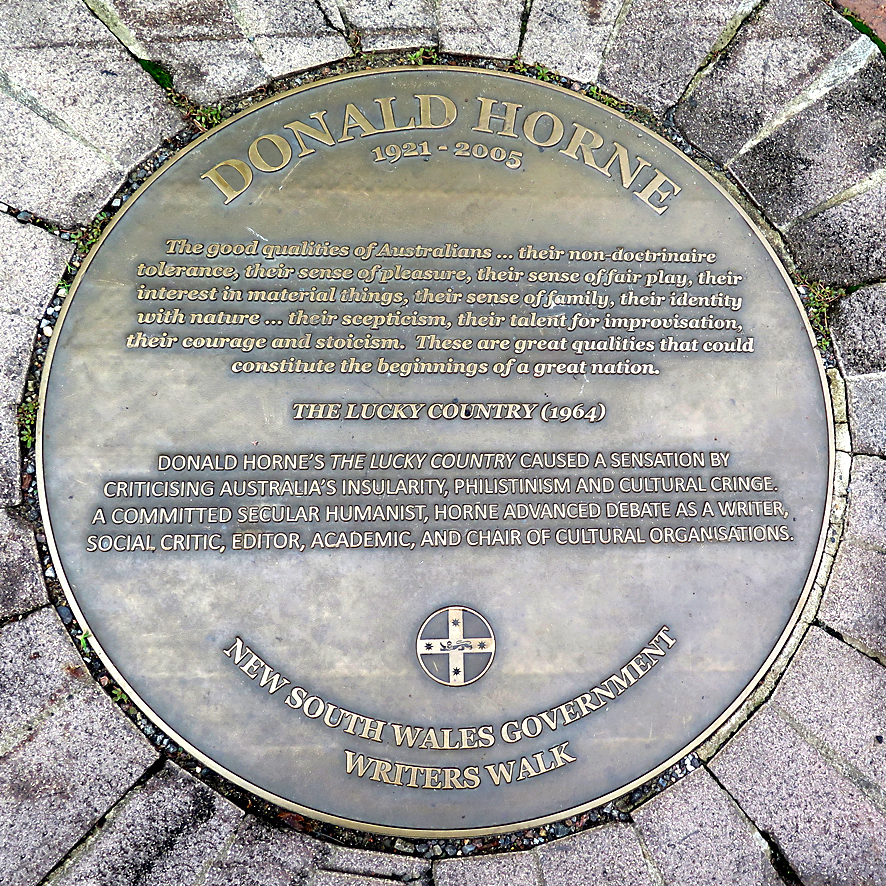
A plaque in the Sydney Writers Walk series at Circular Quay

Donald Richmond Horne AO (26 December 1921 – 8 September 2005) was an Australian journalist, writer, social critic, and academic who became one of Australia's best known public intellectuals, from the 1960s until his death.

Horne was a prolific author who published four novels and more than twenty volumes of history, memoir and political and cultural analysis. He also edited The Bulletin, The Observer and Quadrant. His best known work was The Lucky Country (1964), an evaluation of Australian society that questioned many traditional attitudes: "Australia is a lucky country, run by second-rate people who share its luck."

== Background and early years ==
Donald Horne's early life was recounted in the first volume of his memoirs The Education of Young Donald (1967). He was born in Kogarah, New South Wales and raised in Muswellbrook (where his father was a teacher at the local school) and Sydney. He enrolled in a Bachelor of Arts at the University of Sydney in 1939, but his studies were interrupted by war service. He later attended Canberra University College at the Australian National University, to train as a diplomat.

He moved back to Sydney in 1945 without completing his studies. Instead, he wrote for the Daily Telegraph and other Packer media. Despite never completing an undergraduate degree, in 1973 he was offered a research fellowship in Political Science with the Faculty of Arts by the University of New South Wales. He held several academic positions there for the next fifteen years.

== Career ==
Horne began his career in journalism and worked for a number of Frank Packer's publications, first as a journalist for The Telegraph, then editor of the magazine Weekend, and later the fortnightly intellectual periodical The Observer (1958–61). As editor of the flagship magazine The Bulletin (1961–62 and 1967–72), he removed the magazine's long standing motto "Australia for the White Man". He was co-editor of Quadrant magazine (1964–66).

Appointed as a Senior Research Fellow at the University of New South Wales in 1973, Horne was promoted as a professor of political science in 1984, a member of the University Council between 1983–1986 and Chairman of the Faculty of Arts between 1982 and 1986, retiring as emeritus professor. Between 1992 and 1995, Horne served as Chancellor of the University of Canberra.

He also worked on writing, arts and citizenship boards and was an executive member of the Australian Constitutional Commission. He was Chairman of the Australia Council from 1985 to 1990.

Despite initial conservative views, he was unorthodox and independent-minded, without a consistent political allegiance. He was, however, known through much of his public career for his republicanism, a more independent national self-image, his advocacy for the importance of the arts, and a raising in standards of public debate.

He was still giving media interviews up to the last year of his life, when he died as a result of pulmonary fibrosis after a long illness. His wife and editor, Myfanwy Horne (the daughter of journalist Ross Gollan), later completed his part-written manuscript, published as Dying: a memoir in 2007.

== Honours and legacy ==
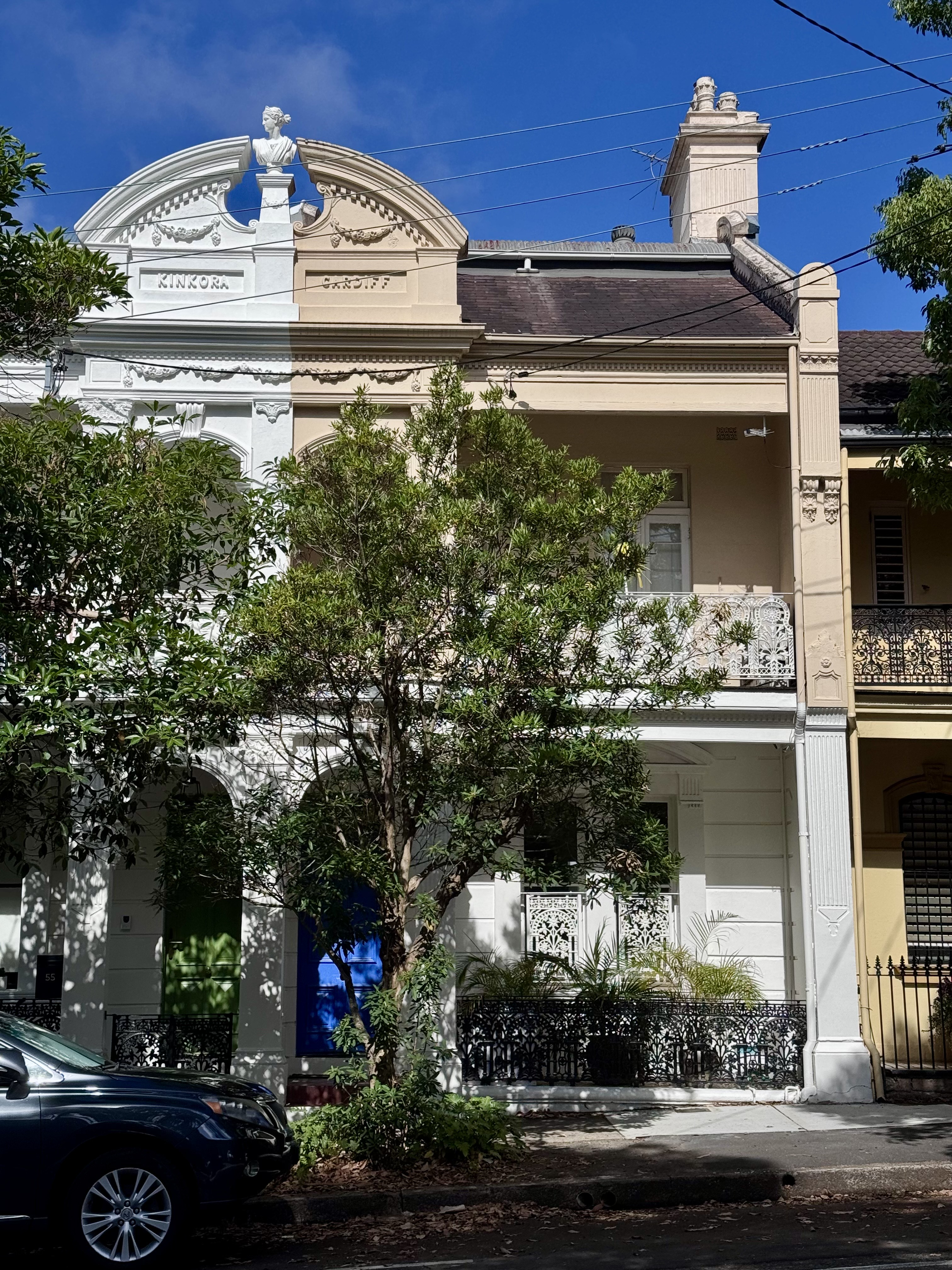
Cardiff, Donald Horne's former home in Woollahra, New South Wales

In 1982, Professor Horne was appointed an Officer of the Order of Australia (AO) for service to literature; and in 2001 was presented with the Centenary Medal for service to the Centenary of Federation celebrations in New South Wales.

He was named as one of Australia's Living National Treasures in 1997, the year of the list's inauguration, by the National Trust.

Horne was conferred with degrees honoris causa by a number of Australian academic institutions, including Griffith University (Doctor of the University), University of New South Wales (Doctor of Letters), University of Canberra (Doctor of the University), the Australian Academy of the Humanities (Fellow), and the University of Sydney (Honorary Doctorate: 2005).

In 2002 he was the recipient of the Australian Humanist of the Year award for his strong advocacy of liberal democracy, multiculturalism, tolerance, republicanism and the recognition of indigenes as Australia's first people.

In 2008, the University of Canberra announced the establishment of the Donald Horne Institute for Cultural Heritage.

In 2016, The Saturday Paper and Aēsop jointly announced the creation of the Horne Prize for essay writing.

In 2017 La Trobe University Press published Donald Horne: Selected Writings, edited by his son Nick.

== Selected bibliography ==
=== Social commentary ===
- The Lucky Country : Australia in the sixties. Ringwood, Victoria: Penguin. 1964. p. 223.
- God Is an Englishman. Angus and Robertson in association with Penguin Books. 1969. p. 281. ISBN 978-0-207-95363-7.
- Beal, David; Horne, Donald (1968). Southern exposure. Tri-Ocean. OCLC 19509397.
- The Australian people : biography of a nation. Sydney, New South Wales: Angus and Robertson. 1972. p. 285. ISBN 978-0-207-12845-5.
- Money made us. Ringwood, Victoria: Penguin. 1976. p. 256. ISBN 978-0-14-004302-0.
- Horne, Donald, ed. (1992). The Trouble with economic rationalism. Newham, Victoria: Scribe Publications. p. 117. ISBN 978-0-908011-22-3.
- Time of hope : Australia 1966–72. Sydney: Angus & Robertson. 1980. p. 186. ISBN 978-0-207-14133-1.
- The great museum : the re-presentation of history. Leichhardt, New South Wales: Pluto Press. 1984. ISBN 978-0-86104-788-8.
- Ideas for a nation. Sydney, New South Wales: Pan Books. 1989. pp. 294. ISBN 978-0-330-27173-8.
- The coming republic. Sydney, New South Wales: Pan Macmillan. 1992. p. 215. ISBN 978-0-7251-0700-0.
- 10 steps to a more tolerant Australia. Camberwell, Victoria: Penguin Books. 2003. ISBN 9780143001829.

=== Political history ===
- Death of the lucky country. Ringwood, Victoria: Penguin. 1976. p. 115. ISBN 978-0-14-070049-7.
- In search of Billy Hughes. Melbourne: Macmillan. 1979. p. 135. ISBN 978-0-333-25247-5.
- Winner take all. Ringwood, Victoria: Penguin Books. 1981. p. 132. ISBN 978-0-14-005876-5.
- Looking for leadership : Australia in the Howard years. Ringwood, Victoria: Penguin. 2000. p. 295. ISBN 978-0-670-91237-7.

=== Autobiography ===
- The education of young Donald. Angus & Robertson. 1967. p. 331.
- Confessions of a new boy. Ringwood, Victoria: Viking. 1985. p. 372. ISBN 978-0-14-008754-3.
- Portrait of an optimist. Ringwood, Victoria: Penguin. 1988. p. 207. ISBN 978-0-14-011236-8.
- Into the open : memoirs 1958–1999. Pymble, New South Wales: HarperCollins. 2000. p. 358. ISBN 978-0-7322-5862-7.
- Horne, Donald; Horne, Myfanwy (2007). Dying : a memoir. Ringwood, Victoria: Viking. p. 265. ISBN 978-0-670-07102-9.

=== Fiction ===
- The permit. Melbourne, Victoria: Sun Books. 1965. p. 175.

=== Travel ===
- Right Way – Don't Go Back. South Melbourne, Victoria: Sun Books. 1978. pp. 163. ISBN 978-0-7251-0304-0.
- The intelligent tourist. McMahons Point, New South Wales: Margaret Gee Publishing. 1992. p. 415. ISBN 978-1-875574-16-2.

Academic offices
Preceded by	Chancellor of the University of Canberra; 1992 – 1995	Succeeded by Wendy McCarthy
