= Affiliated High School of Sichuan University =

School in Chengdu, China

Coordinates: 30.651685°N 104.103830°E

The Affiliated High School of Sichuan University (Chinese: 四川大学附属中学) is a public middle school for grades 7-12. It has two campuses, both of which are located in the Wuhou District, Chengdu, Sichuan, China. It is one of the top rated middle schools in Chengdu and it is listed as "Key School of Sichuan Province".

== History ==
The Affiliated High School of Sichuan University was founded in 1908. After several name changes, it was renamed as "Chengdu No. 12 Middle School" in 1953. This name was deeply rooted in Chengdu. Till now, many local residents still refer the school as "No. 12 Middle School".

In 2003, The School resumed its initial name, "The Affiliated High School of Sichuan University", after incorporating its neighbor, Chengdu No. 29 Middle School, which only offered 7-9 grades education at that time. In 2009, Chengdu No. 50 Middle School was merged into the Affiliated High School, bringing a new campus to it.

== Notable alumni ==
The notable alumni of the school include:

- Guo Moruo (Simplified Chinese:郭沫若), a prestigious Chinese author, poet, historian, and archaeologist.
- Yang Shangkun (Simplified Chinese:杨尚昆), former President of China, and permanent Vice-chair of the Central Military Commission of China.
- Wang Youmu (Simplified Chinese:王右木), one of the first communism revolution leaders in Sichuan.
- Yuan Shiyao (Simplified Chinese:袁诗尧), communism revolutionist and early leader of Chinese Communist Party in Sichuan
- Meng Wentong (Simplified Chinese:蒙文通), historian and distinctive classic Chinese philosophy researcher.
- Li Jieren (Simplified Chinese:李颉人), author and novelist. His works has strong background of Chengdu culture.
