= Peter Exley =

American architect (born 1964)

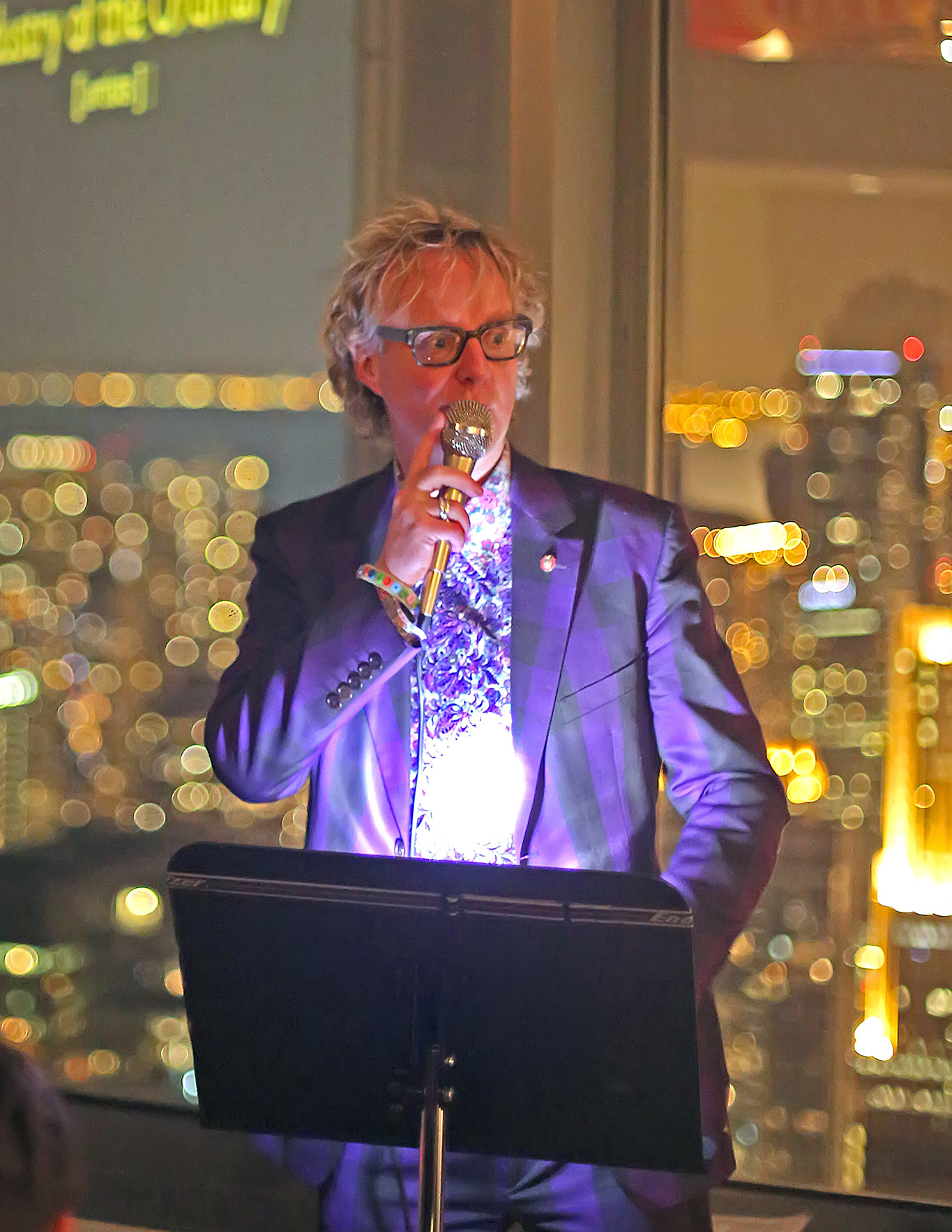
- Peter Exley in 2013
- Born: August 2, 1964 (age 62)
- Education: Newcastle University (B.A. Hons.,1985), University of Pennsylvania (M.Arch.,1990)
- Occupation: Architect
- Practice: Architecture Is Fun, Inc.

Peter Exley (born August 2, 1964 in Harrogate, England) is the co-founder of Architecture Is Fun, a Chicago-based architecture and design firm. Exley's projects include the DuPage Children's Museum, the House in the Woods, a 1,950 m^{2} (21,000 sq ft) Ronald McDonald House in Oak Lawn, Illinois, the Exploration Station children's museum and the Young at Art Museum's exhibits and galleries in Davie, Florida.

== Biography ==
Exley earned a Bachelor of Arts in Architectural Studies with first-class honours from Newcastle University School of Architecture, Planning and Landscape in 1985, and a Master of Architecture from the University of Pennsylvania in 1990. Prior to founding his own firm in 1994, he worked for Skidmore, Owings & Merrill in Chicago and London and with Venturi, Scott Brown and Associates in Philadelphia. Architecture Is Fun's work has been exhibited at the Art Institute of Chicago, the Chicago Architecture Foundation and the ICA in Philadelphia. In 2012, Exley was named President of the American Institute of Architects Chicago for the year 2013. In 2016 Exley was elected an At-large Director for AIA National at the 2016 AIA Convention in Philadelphia. At the AIA Conference on Architecture 2019, Exley was elected 2021 AIA President.

== Awards ==
In 1996 Exley was the recipient of the AIA Chicago Young Architect Award and in 2003 received the AIA Illinois Excellence in Education Award. In 2012, with his partner and wife, Sharon Exley, he was awarded the Benjamin Moore HUE Award for exceptional use of color in commercial architecture. In 2017 Exley was awarded the AIA Chicago and the AIA Chicago Foundation's Professional Excellence & Distinguished Service Award.

== Published work ==
- Exley, Peter & Exley, Sharon (contrib.), Vieyra, Daniel (contrib.)(2007) Design For Kids. Mulgrave: Images Publishing. ISBN 978-1864701807
- Rojals, Marta & Broto, Carles (2006), Great Kids' Spaces. Barcelona: Links Books (pp. 42–47, 190-197, 226-227, 238-241, 250-255). ISBN 84-96263-61-4
- Fang, Abby, (2012), Eden For Boys & Girls. Hong Kong: Designer Books (pp. 42–51, 62-99). ISBN 978-988-16075-1-5
- Kyungil, Lee, (2012), International Magazine of Space Design. bob: 099. Seoul: A&C Publishing Co. Ltd. (pp. 142–147). ISBN/ISSN 1739-2845.
