= Foreign Correspondent (TV series) =

Australian TV program

- Former Foreign Correspondent opening titles
- Genre: Documentary
- Country of origin: Australia
- Original language: English
- No. of seasons: 28

Production
- Executive producer: Matthew Carney
- Running time: 30 minutes

Original release
- Network: ABC; ABC News
- Release: 14 March 1992 – present

Related
- Four Corners (1961–present)

Foreign Correspondent is an Australian weekly documentary-style current affairs television program broadcast on the ABC on Tuesdays at 8:00 pm (AEDT), Wednesdays at 11:30 am, as well as on ABC News on Saturdays at 6:30 pm. It is also available on ABC iview and the Foreign Correspondent website. ABC News repeats the program on Thursdays at 2:30 pm if parliament is in recess. The program premiered at 7:30 pm on Saturday, 14 March 1992. It reports on international events, with an emphasis on politics, global crises, humanitarian affairs and human interest stories.

Foreign Correspondent has been one of Australia's leading programs in its genre since its premiere, and has won several awards, including the Walkley Awards for Excellence in Journalism and White House News Photographers' Association. Since its launch, the news team has travelled to more than 170 countries and produced more than 1,650 reports.

== Impact ==
Correspondents on the program have received attention from other media outlets than the Australian Broadcasting Corporation. Crikey covered Eric Campbell's presence in Thailand after he became a subject of the country's Lèse-majesté laws, which forbids criticism of the monarchy. The Sydney Morning Herald's website featured an article about foreign correspondent Sally Sara as she opened up about her experience in an Afghan military hospital.

There are currently 11 correspondents based in various regions around the world for Foreign Correspondent, including Steve Cannane in Europe and Avani Dias in South Asia. Their work can be found on several media platforms: TV, radio, online and on social media.

In 2014, China warned the ABC that there would be wider implications over its program on Xinjiang.

== See also ==
- List of longest-running Australian television series
