= Thea Exley =

Australian archivist and art historian (1923–2007)

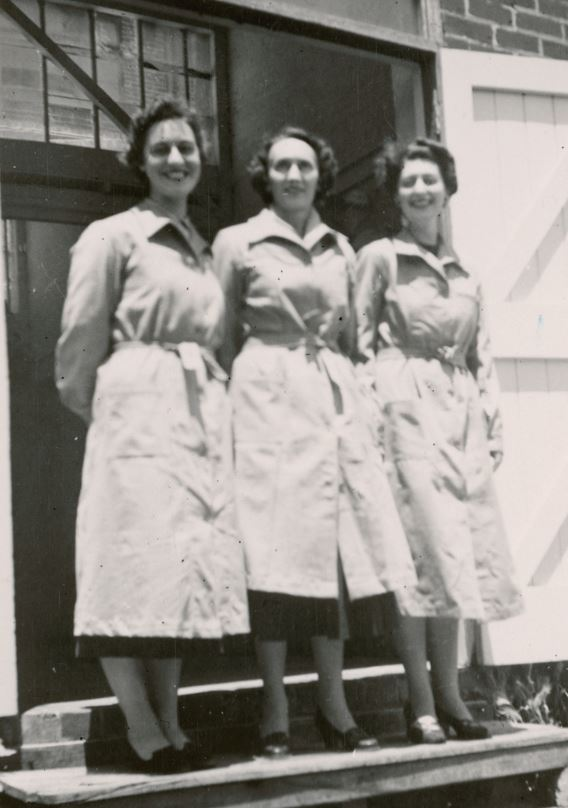
- Thea Exley, Lois Tovey and Rosemary Simmons outside the Archives Office in 1954
- Born: Thea Melvie Exley; 2 September 1923; Melbourne, Victoria, Australia
- Died: 29 January 2007 (aged 83)
- Occupations: Archivist, art historian

Thea Melvie Exley (2 September 1923 – 29 January 2007) was an Australian archivist and art historian, and the first woman to head a regional office of the Australian Commonwealth Archives Office (now the National Archives of Australia). She was also its first national Senior Archivist Reference and Access and the first Director Preservation at the Australian Archives (another predecessor of the National Archives). Exley was an inaugural member of the Australian Society of Archivists and served as a Councillor from 1977 to 1979.

== Early life ==
Exley was born in Melbourne, Australia, on 2 September 1923, the only child of Adelaide (née Walker) and Harold James Exley, who became Deputy Commonwealth Statistician, Tasmania. She was educated at Canberra Girls' Grammar School (then St Gabriel's School) and the Friends School, Hobart. She graduated with a Bachelor of Arts from the University of Tasmania.

== Career ==
During the Second World War, Exley undertook library training at the Commonwealth National Library and, on returning to Hobart, worked at the Public Library there. After the war, she travelled overseas and worked for a time at the library of Australia House, London.

On her return to Australia, Exley was invited by the Commonwealth National Librarian Harold White to join the staff of the Archives Division of the National Library. This led to her joining the Archives Division's Melbourne office as an Archives Officer Grade I on 26 February 1953. In 1961, she became the first woman to head a state office of the Commonwealth Archives Office (the successor to the Archives Division).

During her time in Melbourne, Exley was on the committee of the Archives Section of the Library Association of Australia (LAA), at that time the only Australian association that brought archivists together. She was interested in establishing proper training for archivists and served as an examiner for the LAA's paper in records management from 1963 to 1966.

In 1970, she moved to Canberra as the first Senior Archivist, Reference and Access. Cabinet decisions under the Gorton government (1970) and the McMahon government (1972) created a new and quite complex access regime for Commonwealth records. Proactive examination of material created before 1945 was commenced at this time. Twenty access examiners were employed and Exley was responsible for guiding their discussions and for ensuring that the resulting decisions were collected into a substantial body of policy, precedent and procedure, which became the foundation of the later Australian Archives Access Services Manual. Exley regarded her work striving for an accountable and fair access regime as her most important professional contribution.

Exley participated in the development of the Australian Society of Archivists and became an inaugural member in 1975. From 1977 to 1979, she was a Council Member and chaired the Society's first Public Issues Committee, which made submissions to a number of Commonwealth and State enquiries on copyright, privacy and freedom of information.

From 1977 to 1981, Exley was Chief Archivist with considerable responsibility for the operational work of the office. In 1982 and 1983, she was Regional Director, ACT, when the first purpose built repository in the Canberra suburb of Mitchell became operational.

In 1984, Exley became the Australian Archives' first Director Conservation. Her leadership in commissioning the first survey of the condition of the whole collection, and the subsequent development of a policy and procedural framework to manage the physical state of the records, was significant in providing a management focus on this important area of archives work.

== Personal life ==
Exley retired on 1 September 1988 and received an Australia Day award for her work in 1989. A meeting room at the National Archives Mitchell building was named in her honour in 2003. After her retirement, Exley studied Art History and, in 2000, was awarded the degree of Doctor of Philosophy by the Australian National University for her thesis titled "Patronage by proxy: art competitions in Australia during the twentieth century".

She died on 29 January 2007, after nearly two years of illness. She left a bequest to the National Gallery of Australia, which funded an archivist's position, and another to Bush Heritage Australia. Her papers are archived at the National Library of Australia.
