= Gerran =

Gerran is a male given name. Notable people with this name include:

- Gerran Howell (born 1991), Welsh actor, director, and short film writer
- Gerran Walker (born 1983), American football player

== See also ==
- Gerrans
