= Canberra Grammar School =

Canberra Grammar School (CGS)

- Inside the Quad facing south

Location
- Red Hill, Australian Capital Territory; Australia; 35°19′51″S 149°7′31″E

Information
- Type: independent, co-educational, day and boarding
- Motto: Latin: Deo Ecclesiae Patriae (For God, for Church, for Country)
- Denomination: Anglican
- Established: 1929
- Chairman: Sung Lee (2025)
- Head of school: Justin Garrick
- Chaplain: Reverend James Coats
- Staff: 750 (2025)
- Teaching staff: 280
- Enrolment: 2,227 (ELC to 12, 2025)
- Campuses: Red Hill Campus (junior and senior), Northside Campus (PK to 2),
- Colours: Navy blue, sky blue & gold
- Slogan: Ready for the world
- Annual tuition: AU$37,322 (Year 11 & 12)
- Revenue: A$86.0 million
- Affiliation: Associated Southern Colleges
- Website: cgs.act.edu.au

Canberra Grammar School is a co-educational, independent, day and boarding school located in Red Hill, a suburb of Canberra, the capital city of Australia.

The school is affiliated with the Anglican Church of Australia and provides an education from preschool to Year 12 for boys and girls. In October 2015, the school announced that it would extend co-education to all years, commencing in 2016 with an intake of girls in Years 3 and 4. By 2018, the school became fully co-educational.

The school was founded in 1929 when the existing Monaro Grammar School was relocated from Cooma to Canberra. The foundation stone was laid on 4 December 1928 by Prime Minister Stanley Bruce. Initially, Grammar was attended by only 63 students, but the school has grown considerably since the early 1950s to a total attendance of 2,227 students as of 2025 (57.25% Male, 42.66% Female).

The school has educated one Australian prime minister, Gough Whitlam, who was in the Class of 1934, among other notable alumni.

The school consists of five main campuses across two locations: Red Hill Southside, Red Hill Primary, Red Hill Senior, the Early Learning Center (ELC, Red Hill), and Northside Campbell.

== Curriculum ==
In the primary school, the Australian Curriculum and Early Years Learning Framework requirements are incorporated through International Baccalaureate Primary Years Programme.

In the senior school, from years 7 to 10, the school follows the Australia Curriculum and the IB Middle Years Program (MYP). Unlike other schools in the Australian Capital Territory, Canberra Grammar School does not follow the ACT Year 12 Curriculum. Instead, it is the only school in the ACT where students in years 11 and 12 have the option to study either the New South Wales Higher School Certificate (HSC) or the International Baccalaureate Diploma Programme (IBDP). In 2012, Canberra Grammar became an International Baccalaureate World School.

== Co-curricular ==
Canberra Grammar School is a member of the Associated Southern Colleges (ASC). The school offers many activities outside school hours. These include sport, music and other activities.

- Junior School: athletics, adventure club, ball games, basketball, chess, cricket, cross country running, drama, European handball, gardening, golf, indoor soccer, mini volleyball, multimedia, orienteering, rugby, art, swimming, taekwondo, tennis and triathlon.
- CGS Rowing Centre
  Senior School: athletics club, alternate reality club (ARC), badminton, basketball, CGS Academy (Yr 11 & 12 tutoring for younger students), chess, Code Cadets, community service, cricket, cross country, Cru (Christian Group), debating, dragon boating, Theatre, Duke of Edinburgh awards, Equestrian Club, football (soccer), golf, hockey, mountain biking, netball, orienteering, outdoor education, rowing, rugby, sailing, snowsports, strength and conditioning, STEM Club, Sustainable CGS, swimming, taekwondo, tennis, Thucydides club, water polo and Dance.
- Junior School Music: Junior School Chorale, Junior Choir, Senior Choir, String Orchestra, Concert Band and the Canberra Grammar School Stage Band.
- Senior School Music is made up of two streams of performance groups:
  - The Advanced Musicians Program consists of a senior (higher level) concert band, Chamber Orchestra, senior jazz band, senior percussion ensemble, brass ensemble and Motet. These students have high level performance opportunities.
  - The large ensemble program provides larger ensemble-based experiences, including two concert bands, junior (lower level) jazz band, two string ensembles, a choir, an electric guitar ensemble (both advanced and intermediate), junior percussion ensemble and a piano ensemble.

Many of the Senior School ensembles have done numerous tours overseas over the years.

The school also holds a major musical every two years. Previous productions have included: School of Rock (2026), Grease (2021), Chess (2020-cancelled due to Covid), The Pirates of Penzance (2018) Barnum (2015) and Guys and Dolls (2013).

The school also hosts multiple major competitions, both academic and non-academic. Hosted academic and STEAM competitions include: da Vinci Decathlon (ACT Regional), Kids' Lit Quiz, Secondary Schools Global Challenge, Chess Competitions and Readers Cup. Hosted non-academic compilations include: ACT Regional Sporting Events (e.g. Football, Rugby, Tennis, etc.), ACT School Bouldering Championships and Dragon Boat Races. Hosted Other events include: Debating, Model United Nations and Galambany Seminar.

== Houses ==
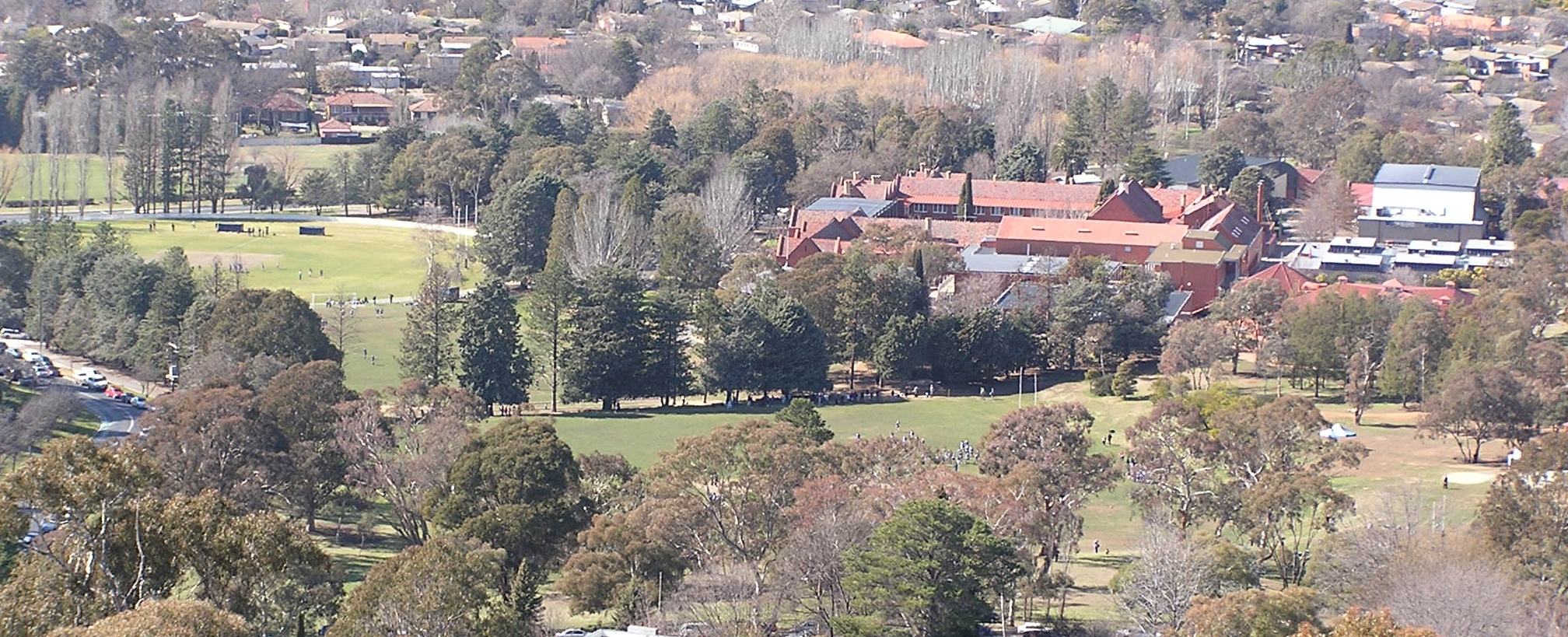
Grounds and buildings of Canberra Grammar School viewed from Red Hill

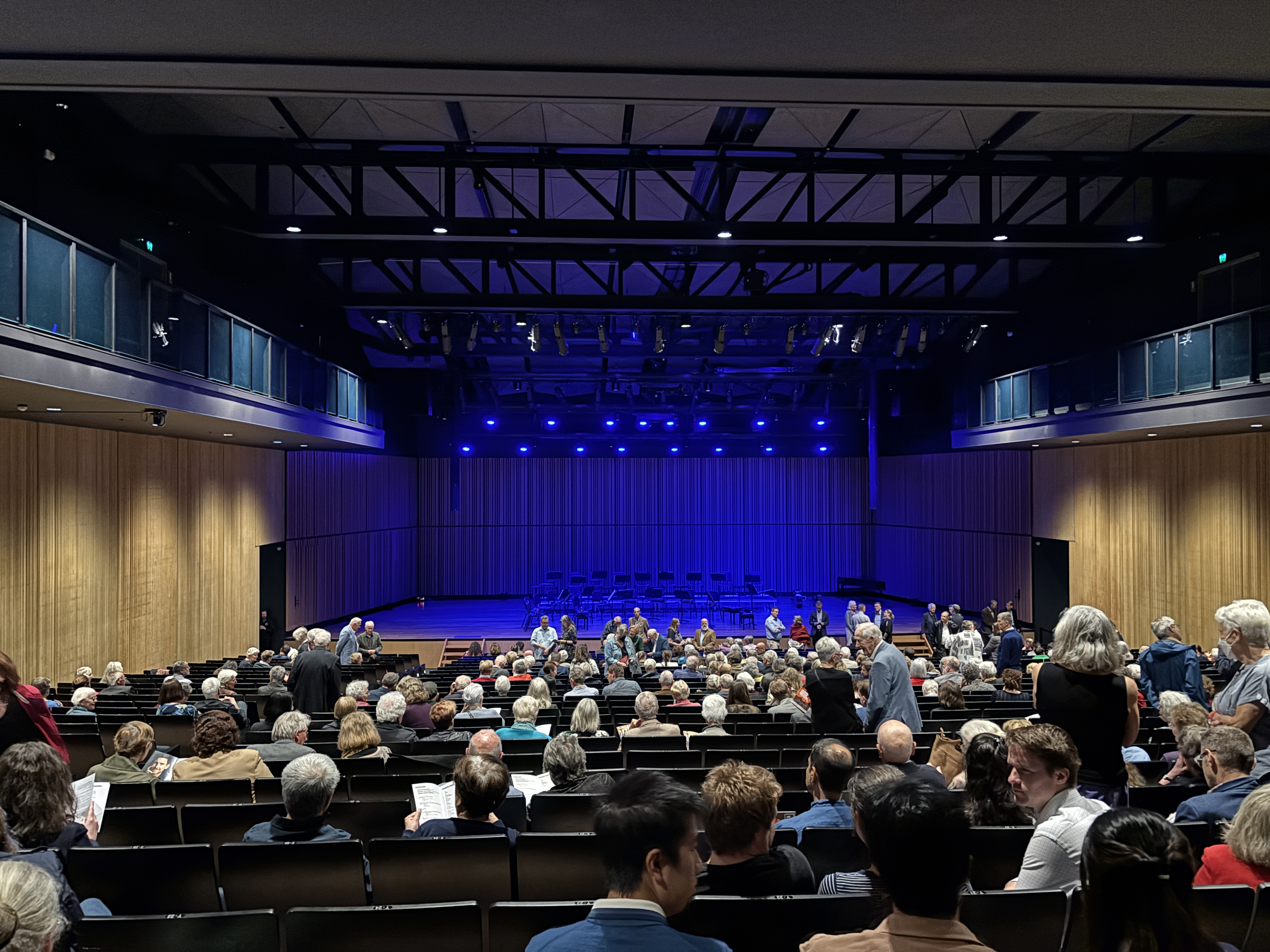
Snow Concert Hall at Canberra Grammar School

=== List of houses ===
As with most Australian schools, Canberra Grammar utilises a house system. The Senior School consists of ten houses:

House	Colour(s)	Mascot
Burgmann		Lion rampant
Blaxland		Swan
Garran		Bull
Garnsey		Dove with olive branch
Eddison		Eagle
Hay		Murray cod
Jones		Dragon
Sheaffe		Pegasus
Edwards		Kookaburra
Middleton		Stag

The school also has three Year 7 houses:

House	Colour	Mascot
Clements		Agnus Dei (lamb)
Burgess		Kangaroo
Snow		Horse

The Junior School has six houses introduced in 2022. These houses were named after local flora and fauna using the traditional Indigenous language of the Ngunnawal people:

House	Colour	Flora / Fauna
Dhiriwiri		Ironbark
Buru		Kangaroo
Guginyal		Kookaburra
Namarang		Wattle
Mulleun		Wedge-tailed eagle
Bariny		Stringybark

The Junior School's original four houses, in place till replacement in start of 2022.

House	Colour	Mascot
Edwards		Dragon
Radford		Lion
Garnsey		Eagle
CJ Shakespeare		Tiger

Garnsey And Edwards became senior school houses in 1982 (Garnsey) and 2003 (Edwards), though this was long after they became Junior School houses.

== Notable alumni ==
=== Academia ===
- Peter Garnsey (1961) professor of history at University of Cambridge.
- Geoffrey Garrett, political scientist
- Malcolm Gillies, vice-chancellor and president, City University, London; vice-chancellor, London Metropolitan University
- Jeffrey Grey, Australian military historian
- Toby Miller, sociologist

=== Business ===
- Kerry Packer, publishing, media and gaming tycoon
- Rowan Dean, advertising executive
- Terry Snow, businessman and philanthropist

=== Media, entertainment and the arts ===
- Richard Glover, author, journalist, ABC radio presenter
- Francis James, RAF pilot and POW during WWII, journalist and publisher, activist against the Vietnam War
- Peter Leonard, former WIN News Canberra reader
- Omar Musa, slam poet and novelist
- James O'Loghlin, ABC Sydney presenter
- Daniel O'Malley, science fiction writer
- Bill Birtles, ABC journalist

=== Politics, public service and the law ===
- Wal Fife, Liberal Party of Australia Federal member for Hume, New South Wales
- Robert Piper, Deputy Special Coordinator for the Middle East Peace Process and the humanitarian coordinator for the Occupied Palestinian Territory, with the rank of UN Assistant Secretary General
- Shane Rattenbury, Member of the Australian Capital Territory Legislative Assembly, 2008–present and Speaker
- Andrew Refshauge, deputy premier of New South Wales 1995–2005
- Richard Refshauge, ACT Supreme Court Justice
- Peter Webb, New South Wales State member for Monaro 1999–2003
- Gough Whitlam (Dux three years running), Prime Minister of Australia, 1972–1975
- Andrew Constance, New South Wales State member for Bega 2003-2021
- Alex Joske China analyst and author specialising in Chinese Communist Party influence and intelligence operations

=== Sports ===
- Bob Brown, former Wallabies rugby union player
- Josh Bruce, St Kilda, Australian rules football player
- Andy Friend, ACT Brumbies former head coach
- David Gallop, former chairman of the National Rugby League (NRL)
- Charlie Hancock, a rugby union player
- Rod Kafer, Wallabies rugby union player
- Peter Kimlin, Wallabies rugby union player
- Michael Milton, world and Australian record holder, Winter Paralympic gold medalist
- Nick McDonald-Crowley, Olympic rower
- Cody Meakin, Australian wheelchair rugby paralympian
- Fergus Pragnell, Australian representative rower
- Guy Shepherdson, Former Australian rugby union player
- Ben Treffers, Junior World Champion swimmer
- Nick Champion de Crespigny, Australian rugby union player
- Zach Bates, Australian Racing driver.

=== Other ===
- David Eastman, former Dux found not guilty of murder on 22 November 2018, after a retrial on a quashed murder conviction
- James Muecke, ophthalmologist, Australian of the Year 2020

== See also ==
- List of schools in the Australian Capital Territory
- List of boarding schools
- Associated Southern Colleges
