= Daramalan College =

Coordinates: 35.253°S 149.138°E

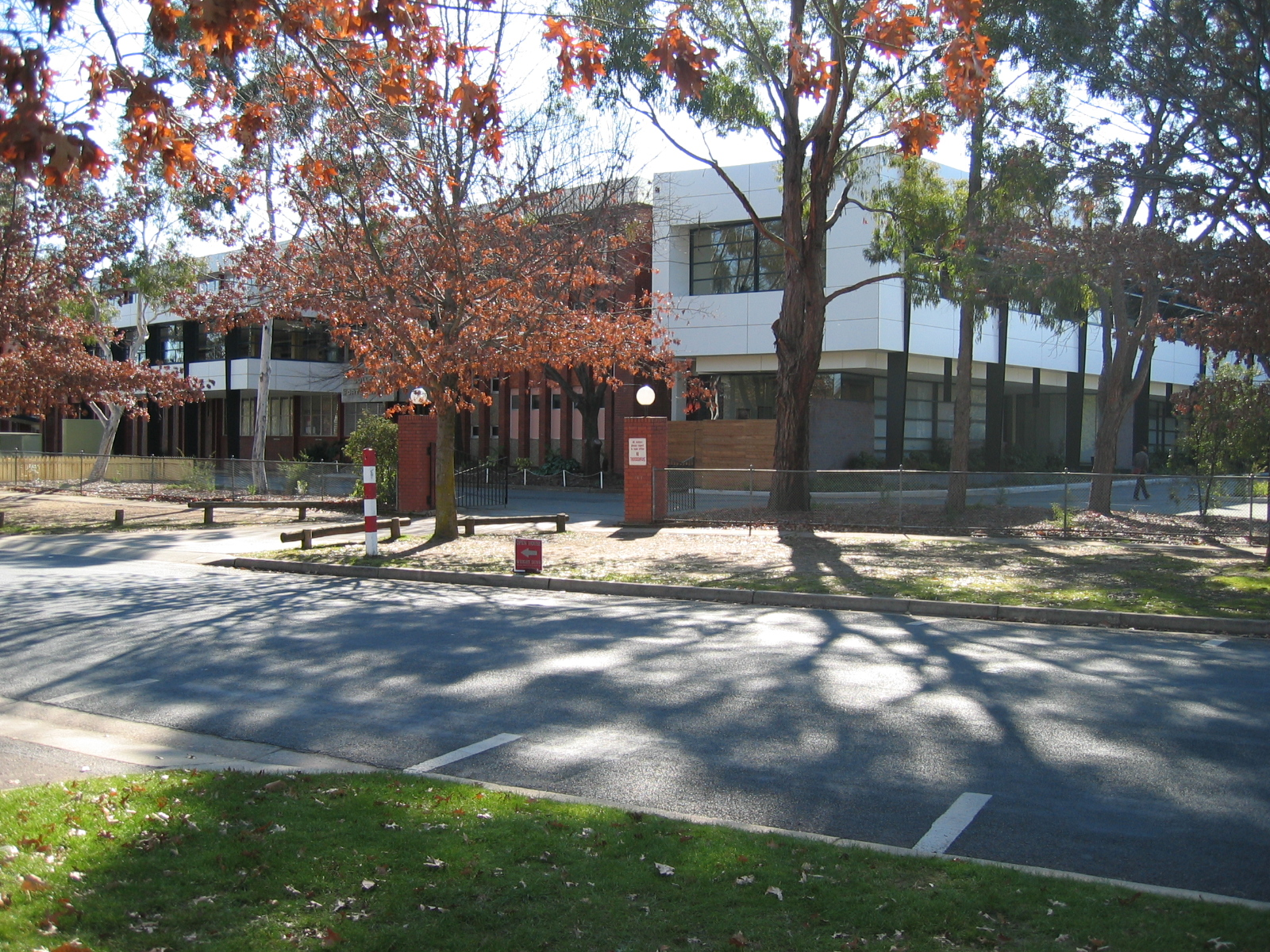
- Cowper St, Dickson Australian Capital Territory; Dickson, Canberra; Australia

Information
- Type: Private secondary school
- Motto: Fortes in Fide
- Religious affiliation: Roman Catholic
- Established: 1962
- Principal: Rachel Francis-Davies
- Enrolment: 1505
- Colours: Black & red
- Mascot: Wedge-tail eagle
- Affiliation: Associated Southern Colleges
- Website: www.daramalan.act.edu.au

Daramalan College is a Roman Catholic high school in Canberra, Australia, located in the suburb of Dickson. It encompasses Year 7 to Year 12, in a co-educational environment. Run by the Missionaries of the Sacred Heart, it has an emblem of a red eagle on a black shield. Its theme colours are red and black.

== History ==
Daramalan College was founded in 1962 as an all-boys school, with girls enrolling in Years 11 and 12 from 1977, and in Year 7 onwards in 1996. The school's motto is "Fortes in Fide," which translates from Latin to "Strong in Faith." In 2017 Daramalan renovated the Dempsey Wing, designed to allow improved education in Science and English. It features new Science Labs and three English classrooms. Construction of this building started in 2016 and ended in 2017. Also included in the building is a new Uniform Shop. The Dempsey Wing is named after a former member of staff. Daramalan College celebrated its 50th anniversary in 2012. The Demolition of the Naughton Wing has taken place and construction of a performing arts centre started in 2022.

== Notable alumni ==
Sporting

- Isabelle Bourne – basketball player
- Peter Bowler – cricketer, (Leicestershire, Tasmania, Derbyshire)
- Joanne Brown (née Alchin Class of 1989) – 1996 and 2000 Australian Softball Olympian bronze medallist
- Peita-Claire Fothergill (née Hepperlin) - Australian soccer player
- Matt Frawley – rugby league player
- Philip Gerrans – philosopher and cricketer
- Mack Hansen – rugby union player
- Marc Herbert – rugby league player
- Nathan Buckley – Australian rules footballer and coach
- Nick Kouparitsas – rugby league player
- Nick Kyrgios – tennis player
- Robbie Perkins – professional baseball player
- Tom Rogers – Australian cricketer for Tasmania
- Ivan Soldo – Australian rules footballer
- Lauren Wells – Australian athlete at 2012 Olympic Games

Arts, Media, Theater, Music

- Lara Cox – actor
- Adam Hyde – half of music duo Peking Duk
- Marty Sheargold – stand-up comedian and radio broadcaster
- Etcetera Etcetera – Australian drag performer, RuPaul's Drag Race Down Under season 1

Business

- Tim Kirk – Clonakilla chief winemaker
- Ryan Sabet (Philips) – Serial entrepreneur, (Kicks Entertainment; Foreshore Festival, Spilt Milk, Mr Wolf)

Politics

- Stephen Conroy – Federal politician, former Minister for Broadband, Communications and the Digital Economy (2007–2013)

Other

- Professor Kiaran Kirk – Dean, ANU College of Science
- Justice Dr Jeremy Kirk – Rhodes Scholar, Vinerian Scholar and Judge of the Supreme Court of New South Wales and a Judge of Appeal

== See also ==
- Associated Southern Colleges
