= Oechsle =

Oechsle or Öchsle is a name of Germanic origin. The name may refer to:

- Ferdinand Oechsle (1774–1852), German mechanical workshop owner, goldsmith, and inventor; eponym of the Oechsle scale
- Gerhard Öchsle (contemporary), West German Olympic bobsledder
- Oechsle scale for measuring the density of grape must; named for Ferdinand Oechsle
- 23995 Oechsle, a main belt asteroid
- Oechsle (retail chain), in Peru
- Öchsle railway, museum line Warthausen–Ochsenhausen
