= Matthew Carney =

Australian journalist

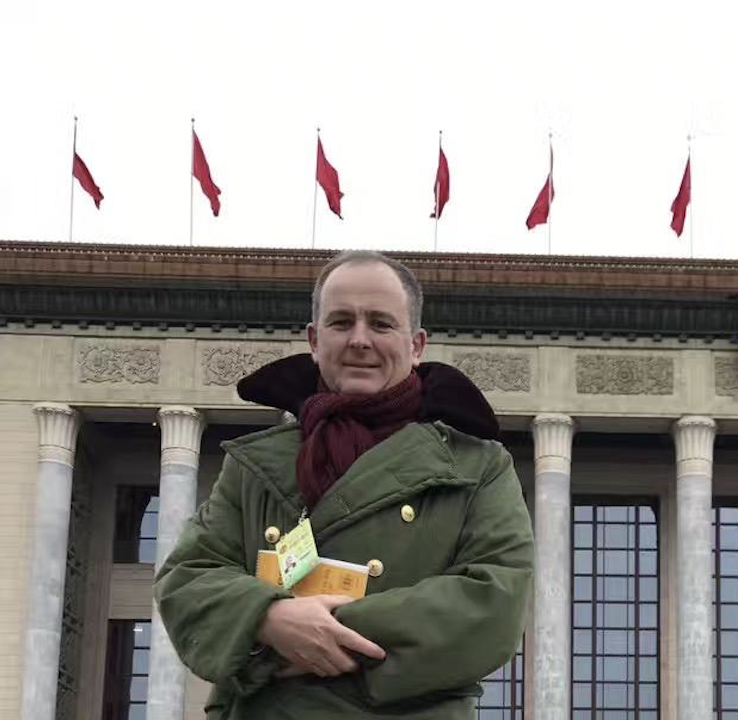
- Carney in 2017
- Occupation: Journalist

Matthew Carney is an Australian journalist and television producer best known for his work with the Australian Broadcasting Corporation. He was the executive producer of Four Corners for four years following work with Foreign Correspondent.

Carney joined the ABC in 1995. He spent most of his career there and at the Special Broadcasting Service (SBS). He became the executive producer of Four Corners and Foreign Correspondent after years as a reporter on both programs. He also worked as a foreign correspondent based in the Middle East for SBS, and China and Asia for the ABC.

Carney has produced more than 200 documentaries over his career and won multiple awards, including the United Nations Media Peace Prize and multiple Walkley Awards.

== Early life and education ==
Carney was born on the 11th of October 1965 in Sydney, Australia and was educated at St. Ignatius College Riverview. In 1988 he received a Bachelor of Economics (Political Science) from The University of Sydney.

== Early reporting career ==
Carney started his career at Beyond Productions in 1989 as an assistant researcher, and after 18 months he was promoted to story producer for the television program Beyond 2000. He negotiated and produced the first extensive access into Vietnam for a series of special reports.

From 1990 until 1994 he worked for SBS Dateline as a researcher, reporter and producer. He also produced and directed for SBS Documentaries. Some highlights: rare access into West Papua and the OPM, uncovering the Korean Mafia in Australia, an investigation into Khmer Rouge war criminals living in Australia, and an exposé of corruption around a Federal Minister.

Carney joined the Australian Broadcasting Company (ABC) in 1995. From 1995 until 1997, he was the National Producer at 7:30 and gained a reputation for hard hitting investigative pieces. Examples include: identifying a Croatian war criminal living in Australia, an investigation into BHP heavy metal contamination at Port Kembla and an exposé of corruption within the RSL.

== Foreign correspondent work ==
As a Foreign Correspondent Carney has reported in more than 50 countries, including China, Iran, Iraq, Syria, Saudi Arabia, West Bank and Gaza, Libya, East Timor, West Papua, North Korea, Sierra Leone, Myanmar, Pakistan, Afghanistan and Sri Lanka.

Carney had some of the first extensive access inside North Korea in 1995 as a producer. He also filmed OPM rebels in West Papua, the Falintil resistance in the hills of East Timor, and the Tamil tigers in the jungles of Sri Lanka.

From 1999 to 2005, Carney set up his own production company called Twofold Films and moved to the Middle East based in Beirut. He reported, filmed, produced and directed current affairs documentaries in the warzones of Gaza, Iraq, Lebanon and Iran. He also delivered films inside Saudi Arabia, Libya, Syria and Egypt. He sold his work multiple times to the world's major broadcasters including, SBS (Australia), BBC (United Kingdom), Arte (France), ZDF (Germany), NHK (Japan), and PBS (America), mostly using Journeyman Pictures as his agent.

== Australian Broadcasting Corporation reporting ==
=== Four Corners reporter ===
Four Corners offered Carney a job as a reporter in 2005 as a journalist who could shoot, direct and produce compelling TV documentaries.

At Four Corners, he gained rare access into the Taliban strongholds in the tribal areas of Pakistan which took 2 years to negotiate, produced the first expose of Australian Special Forces secret “assassination” program which won a Walkley award, uncovered the first hard evidence of the Japanese bribing countries at the International Whaling, portrayed crystal meth addicts in a program called The Ice Age, completed investigative reports that detailed government cover ups and environmental damage in the coal seam gas rush, and triggered a government inquiry to the ambulance service in Western Australia.

=== North Asia correspondent, 2014-2015 ===
For two years, Carney lead coverage on North Asia for the ABC on all media platforms (television, radio, and digital) on the strategic, economic and social aspects of the region, based out of Tokyo, Japan.

He had early access inside Fukushima nuclear plant and comprehensive access inside Japan's Defence forces, and the Yakuza. Carney also reported on innocents convicted to Japan's death row. Carney's story on the Hikikimori - the million young Japanese men who have turned their backs on society and have locked themselves inside their rooms - received the highest number of hits on ABC digital in 2015.

=== Bureau chief and China correspondent, 2015-2018 ===
Carney became ABC's China bureau chief in 2015. He planned and executed coverage of major news events and output across North Asia on ABC platforms. One of his notable works there was "Generation Left Behind," in which he discusses the 61 million children in China who are left to grow up with no parents.

During this time he produced 5 documentaries for Foreign Correspondent, including “Last Eagle Hunters of Mongolia”, and an exposé of China's Dystopian future called “Leave No Dark Corner”.

Carney and his family were thrown out of China in late 2018.

== Editorial leadership ==
=== Foreign Correspondent ===
As executive producer from 2018 to 2022, Carney led Foreign Correspondent in tripling their audiences on digital, iView and YouTube. The Mexican Drug Cartels story he commissioned is still one of highest viewed ABC programs on YouTube at 31 million views. In 2021, Foreign Correspondent had the biggest growth on broadcast of all the current affairs programs at the ABC.

During his leadership, Carney organized coverage of the war in Ukraine, the Taliban takeover of Afghanistan, China, and Russia.

=== Four Corners ===
Matthew Carney was the Executive Producer of Four Corners for 4 years, from 2022 to 2026. On his exit, he was lauded as one of Australia's "most respected journalists."

Carney reformed the story culture at the program, and more than doubled audiences across digital, social and broadcast to honour and uphold the 65 year tradition of Four Corners. Under his leadership Four Corners won multiple Walkley Awards.

== Awards ==
Matthew Carney's stories have been recognised with awards both in Australia and internationally.

=== Reporting awards ===
- Walkley Awards
  - Winner: 2012 Four Corners ABC 'In Their Sights' with journalist Thom Cookes
  - Winner: 2000 Dateline SBS 'Sierra-Leone - The Cost of Peace'
  - Winner: 2002 Dateline SBS 'The New Kurdistan'
  - Finalist 14 times.
- Logie Awards
  - Winner: 2001 Award for Most Outstanding Special Report in a Public Affairs Program 'The Dirty War'
  - Finalist 2 times.
- United Nations Media Peace Prize
  - Winner: 2017 award for Promotion of Children Rights and Issues 'Generation Left Behind'
  - Winner: 1994 award for his story, 'Khmer Rouge War Criminals'
- Eureka Prize
  - Winner: 2006 Environmental Journalism prize alongside Morag Ramsay and Anne Connolly
- New York Festivals TV and Film Awards
  - Gold medal
  - Silver medal
- Rory Peck Award
  - Runner Up: 2003 'Kirktown - A Town Divided'
  - Runner Up: 1997 'East Timor' with cinematographer Chantel Abouchar
- Lowy Institute Media Award
  - Finalist: 2022 'Return of the Taliban' as part of ABC's Foreign Correspondent team
  - Finalist: 2019 'Leave No Dark Corner'

=== Other awards ===
- Order of Timor Leste
  - In 2025, Carney was awarded the Order of Timor-Leste to honour two documentaries he filmed in the 1990s that demonstrated the Falintil resistance was fully operational.
