= Rock Eisteddfod Challenge results (Australia) =

These are the results of the Rock Eisteddfod Challenge in Australia, since 1984.

== National results ==
Year	1st			2nd			3rd			Notes
Year	School	Musical item	State	School	Musical item	State	School	Musical item	State	Notes
1984	St Johns Park		NSW							
1985	Sylvania High	House of Cards	NSW	Sarah Redfern High^{[note a]}	Tour Egypt	NSW				
1987	Pittwater High		NSW	Sarah Redfern High	Desart	NSW	Pakenham Secondary		Vic	
1988	Sarah Redfern High	Culprits								
1989	Karingal Secondary									
1990	St Columba's	Vivid Changes	Vic							
1991	De La Salle Ashfield		NSW							
1992	Belmont High School	JFK	Vic							
1993	Rooty Hill High	Clash of the Tartans	NSW							
1994	St. Columba's	Mediogre	Vic							
1995	Rooty Hill High	Blaze of Glory	NSW							
1995	Canberra High School	The Plight of the Farmer	ACT							
1996	Pymble Ladies	The Gallery of Life	NSW							
1997	Toronto High	Let them eat cake	NSW							
1998	Diamond Valley Secondary	Safari	Vic							
1999	Engadine High	The Time Machine	NSW							
2000	Bomaderry High	The Willow Pattern	NSW							
2001	Terrigal High	Matroyska	NSW	Northmead High	So The Tale Goes	NSW	Bomaderry High	Swan Lake	NSW	
2002	Randwick Girls' and Randwick Boys' High	To Kill A Mockingbird	NSW	Mackellar Girls High	African Odyssey	NSW	Engadine High	Wild Wild West	NSW	
2003	St Columba's	Cabaret Australia	Vic	Randwick Girls' and Randwick Boys' High	The Secret Garden	NSW	Cranebrook High		NSW	
2004	Northmead High	Sword of Qin	NSW	Smiths Hill High	A Fine Line	NSW	Pymble Ladies	Degas	NSW	
2005	Northmead High	Sins: Vice or Virtue	NSW	Cranebrook High	Ole	NSW	Fairhills High	Hypothesis 2084	Vic	
2006	St Columba's	Fear Or No Fear	Vic	Smiths Hill High	Tibet: Roof of the World	NSW	Randwick Girls' and Randwick Boys' High	A League of Their Own	NSW	
2007	Randwick Girls' and Randwick Boys' High	Tank Girl	NSW	Calwell High	Kokoda	ACT	Fairhills High	Japanime	Vic	
2008	St Columba's	Women's Rites	Vic	Mackellar Girls High	The Barrier: An Irish Love Story	NSW	Terrigal High	Workforced	NSW	
2009	Mackellar Girls High	The Grapes of Wrath	NSW	Sutherland PCYC	Rosa Parks: Woman of Colour	NSW	Randwick Girls' and Randwick Boys' High; Stella Maris College	The House of Berlei: A Story of our Nations Foundations; Dare To Be Different	NSW	
2011	Brighton Secondary	MAX	SA	Cranebrook High	Whaka	NSW	Woolooware High; Brunswick Secondary	Still Alice; Submerged	NSW; Vic	
2012	Woolooware High	The Tell Tale Heart	NSW	Knox United	93473	Vic	St Columba's	A Grim Tale	Vic	

^[note a]: Molly Meldrum was a 1985 judge and reportedly said "Sarah Redfern High was easily best of the night and should have taken out first place".

=== National TV Specials ===
Year	ACT Musical item	NSW Musical item	QLD Musical item	SA Musical item	TAS Musical item	VIC Musical item	WA Musical item	Wild card entrants Musical items	Notes
1993	Canberra Girls Grammar/Canberra Grammar School; Freddy Is Back	Rooty Hill High School; Clash of the Tartans	Trinity College – Beenleigh; The Fall of the House of Windsor	Victor Harbour High School; Just Try It	St Michael's Collegiate College; The Mists of Time	Lowther Hall Anglican School; Playing To Win	Bunbury Senior High School; Changing Channels Regional: Broome Youth Support Group; The Reason of Love		
1994	St. Clare's College; Does Crime Pay	Rooty Hill High School; My Enemy, My Brother Regional: Trinity Catholic College; Legend of Sherwood	Miami State High School; Television: The Drug of the Nation Regional: Yeppoon State High School; Picnic at Hanging Rock	Norwood Morialta High School; Don't You Mess Around with My Sister Darwin: Katherine High School; Urban Sprawl NT: Centralian College; Gangsta Party	Penguin High School; We Paved Paradise	St. Columba's College; Mediogre Regional: Bellarine Secondary College; Turmoil at the Temple	Padbury Senior High School; Blackboard Jungle Regional: Mandurah Senior High School; Stars And Stripes Stereotyped		
1995	Canberra Grammar School; On A Path To Freedom	Pymble Ladies College; What A Buzz South NSW Regional: Bathurst High School; The Great Race North NSW Regional: Toronto High School; Drought	Beaudesert State High School; Pandora's Box Regional: Harristown State High School; Harristown Rocks The Drought	Seaview High School; This Time NT: Katherine High School; The Trial of Humanity	Riverside High School; Future, Past – Dance Will Last	Lowther Hall Anglican School; Tribute Regional: Murray High School; Media Influences	Penrhos College; Life Is Just A Bowl of Cherries Regional: Broome Youth Support Group; Dancing Through Time	Rooty Hill High School Blaze of Glory; Bundamba State High School Jamaica-Me-Crazy-Mun; Beenleigh State High School Open Your Mind; J J Cahill Memorial High School The Show Must Go On; Randwick Boys/Girls High Schools Madame Butterfly; Langwarrin Secondary College Bad Medicine	
1996	St Peter's Catholic College; Moses and the Ten Commandments	Pymble Ladies College; Gallery of Life Regional: Terrigal High School; Who'll Take A Glove?	Kawana Waters State High School; Wildthings Regional: Mt St Bernard's College; Joan of Arc	Morphett Vale High School; Simply Individual	Guilford Young College; Chess – The Game of Life Regional: Penguin High School; Ali Baba and the Forty Thieves	St. Columba's College; The X Files Conspiracy Regional: Bellarine Secondary College; The Debutante's Dilemma	Perth Modern School; Technology – Helpful or Deceitful Friend Regional: Mandurah Senior High School; Celebrations	J J Cahill Memorial High School Reality Bites; Randwick Boys/Girls High Schoolsl Wuthering Heights; Langwarrin Secondary College Don't Stop The Rain; Mackellar Girls High School Universal Refugee; Trinity Catholic College A Star Is Torn	
1997	St. Clare's College; All I Want For Christmas	Engadine High School; Mission Impossible – World Peace Regional: Toronto High School; Let Them Eat Cake	Ferny Grove State High; Salome – A Dance of Death Regional: Trinity Bay State High; James Bond – Always Take The Risk	Taperoo High School; Hello Earth	Ogilvie High School; Metamorphosis	Bellarine Secondary College; Something Wicked This Way Comes	Perth Modern School; Berlin	Randwick Boys/Girls High Picnic at Hanging Rock; Belmont High School Chariots of the Gods; Terrigal High School Friday on My Mind; Rooty Hill High School Unmask The Mystery; St Francis Xavier College Prisoners of the Past	
1998	-	Terrigal High School; A Pocket Full of Posies Regional: Bomaderry High School; The Rime	Shailer Park State High; Atlantis – The Lost City Regional: Dalby State High; Acquisition	The Heights School; A Gaelic Tale	St Patrick's College; Never Say, Never Land	Diamond Valley College; Safari	Mandurah Senior High School; Legends	Monterey Secondary College Thunderbirds Are Go; Woodville High School Romeo And Juliet; Northmead High School Why Would Anna?; Mackillop Catholic College The Rhyme of the Ancient Marriner	
1999	Merici College; In Xanadu Did Kubla Khan	Terra Sancta College; The Dreamcatcher Regional: Kelso High School; The Legend of Orpheus and Eurydice	Keebra Park State High; Save The Day Regional: Harristown State High; What's Black and White – And Read All Over?	Seaview High School; High Hopes	Ogilvie High School; Toying With Temptation	Penleigh and Essendon Grammar School; China – Awakening Dragon	Aranmore Catholic College; Where in the World Is Wally?	Terrigal High School Two Fathoms Deep; Bribie Island State High When Bugs Byte; Engadine High School The Time Machine; Seymour College Toon Angel; Bellarine Secondary College Quassimodo	
2000	Merici College; Scheherazade	Bomdaerry High School; The Willow Pattern Regional: PLC Armidale; Hooked	Bribie Island State High; Eureka Regional: Cairns State High; Extreme Dreams	The Heights School; The Holocaust	Guilford College; Jubilee 2000	Bellarine Secondary College; Mystery Flight – Destination Unknown	Como Senior High School; Urbanisation	Monterey Secondary College The Ice Maiden; Randwick Boys & Girls High Carmen; Pymble Ladies College Something For Everyone; St Edmund's College Romulus and Remus; Melton Secondary College De Amor En Espana	
2001	St Clare's College; Into The Net	Terrigal High School; Matroyshka Regional: All Saints College; On A Night Like This	Harristown State High; The Great Aussie Backyard BBQ Regional: Trinity Bay State High; Buffy Battles The Evil Master	Seymour College; What Price The Unicorn?	Launceston College; Dream Your Dreams	Bellarine Secondary College; With A Turn of the Page	Mandurah Combined School; Rainbow Road	Bomaderry High School Swan Lake; Randwick Boys & Girls High Othello – The Moor of Venice; St Columba's College The American Dream; Northmead High School So The Tale Goes...; Marist College - Ashgrove Lest We Forget	
2003	Lake Tuggeranong College; The Dirty 30's	Cranebrook High School; Hear Us Roar Regional: Toronto High School; Freak	Bribie Island State High; The Ekka Regional: Trinity Bay State High; Toy Wars	Hallet Cove School; Hiding on the Inside	Bridgewater High School; On The Menu	St Columba's College; Cabaret Australia	Ocean Reef Senior High; Thredbo's Heroes	Western Heights College Rhythm of Life; Lisarow High School 1776; Harristown State High School Pirates Ahoy; Bomaderry High School Waltzing Matilda; Randwick Boys & Girls High The Secret Garden	
2005	Calwell High School; Follow The Spirit, Follow The Fence	Northmead High School; Sins: Vice or Virtue	Keebra Park State High School; The Crimson Key	Fremont-Elizabeth High School; A Faerie Tale	Newstead Secondary College; Corruption of Innocence – The Cycle of Greed	Parkdale Secondary College; Return To Whitechapel	Como Secondary College; Hiroshima – Out of the Ashes	Smith's Hill High School Nelson Mandela: Son of Africa; Cranebrook High School Ole; Fairhills High School Hypothesis: 2084	
2006	Calwell High; The Devils in the Detail	Randwick Girls' and Randwick Boys' High; A League of Their Own	Marist College; Born To Be Will	Brighton Secondary; Flight of Fancy	St Patrick's College; Clear The Way	St Columba's College; Fear or No Fear	Lesmurdie Senior High; Jekyll and Pride	Fairhills High The Greatest Show on Earth; Smiths Hill High Tibet: Roof of the World; Mackellar Girls High A Streetcar Named Desire; Northmead High Porphyria's Lover	
2007	Calwell High; Kokoda	Randwick Girls' and Randwick Boys' High; Tank Girl	Harristown State High; Wanted: Robin Hood	Woodville High; Who's Afraid?	Riverside High; Buzz Splat Bang Clash Calm	Brunswick Secondary; Solstice	Belridge Senior High; Giants of the Sea	Lisarow High The Melting Point; Fairhills High Japanime; Daramalan College Madame Butterfly; Parkdale Secondary Boudica – Queen of the Iceni; Smith's Hill High Turandot; Northmead High Capone; Cranebrook High Coppelia	
2008	Calwell High; Mao's Last Dancer	Pymble Ladies; Woman Like Me	St Mary's, Maryborough; Get Steppin'	Brighton Secondary; All The Pretty Boxes	Bridgewater High; B.H.S.	Fairhills High; Oceania	Duncraig Senior High; Fight or Flight	Cranebrook High Hocus Pocus; Mackellar Girls High The Barrier: An Irish Love Story; Bomaderry High Rusalka; St Columba's College Women's Rites; Terrigal High Workforced; Brunswick Secondary Glitch; Northmead High Interview with the Vampire	
2009	Calwell High; Monkey See, Monkey Do	Mackellar Girls High; The Grapes of Wrath	Beaudesert State High; Buy Now, Pay Later	Brighton Secondary; Corpora Delecti	Riverside High; Who Am I? Same, Similar, Unique	Fairhills High; Bon Appetit	Belridge Senior High; Journey into The Unknown	Randwick Girls' and Randwick Boys' High; The House of Berlei: A Story of Our Nations Foundations|Harristown State High; Venetian Vendetta|Smiths Hill High; Guernica|Parkdale Secondary; The Dream Stealers|Sutherland PCYC; Rosa Parks: Woman of Colour|Como Secondary; Letters From War|Terrigal High; Doorways|Stella Maris, Manly; Dare To Be Different|Emerald Secondary; Wanted: Creator of Chaos|Bomaderry High; The Crucible – Hunting for Witches|Pascoe Vale Girls'; The Masks We Wear	

RAW Division
Year	1st		2nd		3rd		Notes
Year	School	State	School	State	School	State	Notes
2012	Randwick Girls' and Randwick Boys' High	NSW	Kilbreda College and St Bede's College	VIC	Mackillop Catholic College; MLC School	both NSW	

JRock Division
Year	1st		2nd		3rd		Notes
Year	School	State	School	State	School	State	Notes
2011	St Peter's Anglican primary school The Hiding Place: the story of Corrie Ten Boom	NSW					
2012	Dapto Public	NSW	St Joseph's Catholic Primary	NSW	Kew Primary	VIC	

== State and territory results ==
=== Australian Capital Territory ===
Open Division
Year	1st		2nd		3rd		Notes
Year	School	Musical item	School	Musical item	School	Musical item	Notes
1995	Canberra High School	The Plight of the Farmer					
1997	Lake Tuggeranong College	Dracula: Thriller					
2003	Monaro High		Daramalan College		Lanyon High		
2004	Calwell High; Merici College				Monaro High		
2005	Calwell High		Daramalan College		Hawker College		
2006	Calwell High	The Devils in the Detail	Merici College				
2007	Calwell High		Daramalan College				

=== New South Wales ===
==== Newcastle Finals ====
Year	1st		2nd		3rd		Notes
Year	School	Musical item	School	Musical item	School	Musical item	Notes
1998	All Saints College St Peter's Campus |All Saints College St Peter's Campus		Toronto High School		Waratah Technology High School		
1992	St Francis Xavier's (Newcastle)	What Time is Love	Randwick Girls' and Randwick Boys' High		Ashcroft High		
1999	Terrigal high (Smith's hill high) Terra Sancta College						

==== Sydney Finals ====
Sydney Open Division
Year	1st		2nd		3rd		Notes
Year	School	Musical item	School	Musical item	School	Musical item	Notes
1993	Terrigal High	Major Tom	Hurlstone Ag	The Sacred Covenant			
1995	Smith's Hill High	Luna Magic					
1996	Engadine High		Macarthur Anglican School	Hey Red			
1997	Albion Park High						
1998	Monaro High		Sarah Redfern High School		Lisarow High		
1999	Northmead High	Hawaii's Last Hope	Dubbo Christian School	The lion the witch and the wardrobe	John Therry Catholic High	Women on Mars	
2000	Catherine McAuley Westmead	To clone or not to clone	Woolooware High		Lismore PCYC		
2001	Irrawang High	Brave	Mackellar Girls High		Davidson High		
2002	Marian College	Vision					
2003	Colyton High	Forever Young: The Matt Shepherd Story	Gosford Christian School		Sutherland PCYC	Aitya	
2004	Davidson High; Rose Bay Secondary	Bad Knight in Baghdad; I, Robot			Calwell High		
2005	St Peter's Catholic College	Guilty Til Proven Innocent	Kelso High	How Loved I Am	Cranebrook High	Ole	
2006	Cranebrook High	Taj	Northern Beaches Secondary	Mary Bryant: Her Amazing Escape From Botany Bay	Stella Maris College	I Hope This Finds You Well	
2007	Calwell High		Chifley College		Woolooware High		
2008	MLC School	The Shades of Grief	Bomaderry High	Rusalka – legend of the lake	Northern Beaches Secondary; Emmaus Catholic College	Clara; The beautiful experience	
2009	Sutherland PCYC	Rosa Parks: Woman of Colour	Stella Maris College		Springwood High		
2011	Stella Maris College		Woolooware High		Parramatta PCYC		
2012	Tuggerah Lakes Secondary (Tumbi Umbi Campus)		Northern Beaches Secondary		Colyton High		

Sydney Premier Division
Year	1st		2nd		3rd		Notes
Year	School	Musical item	School	Musical item	School	Musical item	Notes
1993	De La Salle Ashfield		St Francis Xavier's (Newcastle)	Random Tox	Cromer High	A Bicycle Ride in Hyde Park	
1994	Sarah Redfern High	A World Turning Rite	Pymble Ladies		De La Salle Ashfield		
1995	Pymble Ladies College	What A Buzz!	Rooty Hill High	Blaze of Glory	Bomaderry High	Let The Dream Come True	
1996	Toronto High	Toll of Coal	Pymble Ladies College	The Gallery of Life	Randwick Girls' and Randwick Boys' High	Wuthering Heights	
1997	Toronto High	Let Them Eat Cake	Rooty Hill High	The Mask of Zorro	Cromer High		
1998	Pymble Ladies College	Queen of the night the quest of Medusa	Bomaderry High	" Rhyme of the ancient Mariner "	Terrigal High	The black plague	Toronto High
1999	Terrigal High	Two Fathoms Deep	Smith's Hill High	Trivial Pursuit	Terra Sancta College	Dreamcatcher	
2000	Bomaderry High	The Willow Pattern	Randwick Girls' and Randwick Boys' High; Terra Sancta College	Carmen; It Takes All Sorts			
2001	Randwick Girls' and Randwick Boys' High	Othello	Terrigal High	Matryoshka	Bomaderry High	Swan Lake	
2002	Randwick Girls' and Randwick Boys' High	To Kill A Mockingbird	Mackellar Girls' High	African Odyssey	Monaro High	Will You Look at Us by the River	
2003	Bomaderry High; Randwick Girls' and Randwick Boys' High	Waltzing Matilda; The Secret Garden			Monaro High	Rising From The Static	
2004	Mackellar Girls' High	Fall River	Randwick Girls' and Randwick Boys' High	Paikea – The Legend of the Whale Rider	Northmead Highl	Sword of Qin	
2005	Northmead High	Sins: Vice or Virtue	Randwick Girls' and Randwick Boys' High	Let Me Entertain You - The Story of Miss Gypsy Rose Lee	Smith's Hill High	Mandela: Son of Africa	
2006	Randwick Girls' and Randwick Boys' High	A League of Their Own	Terrigal High	I Am Sam	Mackellar Girls' High	A Streetcar Named Desire	
2007	Randwick Girls' and Randwick Boys' High	Tank Girl	Smith's Hill High	Turandot	Northmead High	Capone	
2008	Pymble Ladies College	Women Like Me	Terrigal High	Work Forced	Randwick Girls' and Randwick Boys' High	Looking for Alibrandi	
2009	Mackellar Girls (NSBC)	The Grapes of Wrath	Randwick Girls' and Randwick Boys' High	The House of Berlei: A Story of Our Nation's Foundations	Terrigal High	Doorways	
2011	MLC School		Cranebrook High; Lisarow High				
2012	Northmead Creative and Performing Arts High		Smith's Hill High; St Joseph's High School				

RAW Division
Year	1st		2nd		3rd		Notes
Year	School	Musical item	School	Musical item	School	Musical item	Notes
2006	Toronto High						
2007	Ravenswood School for Girls						
2008	Singleton High	Charlie Chaplin	St Peter's Catholic College	Control-controlled?	Sutherland PCYC	Beyond the Mirror	
2009	St Peter's Catholic College		Engadine High		Randwick Girls' and Randwick Boys' High		
2011	St Peter's Catholic College		Randwick Girls' and Randwick Boys' High		Ravenswood School for Girls		
2012	Randwick Girls' and Randwick Boys' High		Mackillop Catholic College; MLC School				

Small Team Division
Year	Winner		Notes
Year	School	Musical item	Notes
2003	Muirfield High		
2004	Muirfield High		
2005	Kingswood High		
2006	Abbotsleigh		

State Challenge Division
Year	Winner		Notes
Year	School	Musical item	Notes
2000	Engadine High		

==== Finals held in regional New South Wales ====
===== Bathurst =====
Open Division
Year	1st		2nd		Notes
Year	School	Musical item	School	Musical item	Notes
1990	Diocesan Girls Catholic High School				
1991	Kelso High	Annie - Trapped In The World of Gangsters			
1992	Bathurst High		Kelso High	Totalitaria	
1993	Diocesan Girls Catholic High School		TIE Kelso High & Bathurst High	Kelso The Seasons Bathurst The Jungle	
1994	Bathurst High	Arabian Nights	Kelso High	Sleeping Beauty Meets Her Match	
1995	Kelso High	Theseus and the Minotaur	Bathurst High	Bathurst 1000 - The Great Race	
1996	Kelso High	The Hot Zone	Bathurst High	Alice In Wonderland	
1997	Bathurst High	Romeo & Juliet	Kelso High	A Mid Summer Night's Dream	
1998	Bathurst High		Kelso High	When You Wish Upon A Star	
1999	Kelso High	Orpheus & Eurydice			
2000	Kelso High	Carmen's Heart Beats For Art			
2001	Bathurst PCYC	A Day In May	Kelso High	Joan of Arc	
2002	Kelso High	The Red Shoes	Bathurst PCYC	Carpe Diem - Seize The Day	
2003	Bathurst PCYC	The Myst			
2004	Bathurst PCYC	Chan	Kelso High	Aleko & the Gypsies	
2005	Kelso High	How Loved Am I?	Bathurst PCYC	1:23am	
2006	Kelso High	Vampire	Bathurst PCYC	And Now For Something Completely Different	
2007	Bathurst PCYC	Into The Arms Of Angels	Kelso High	Erika's Story	
2008	Bathurst PCYC	Saturday Morning	Kelso High	Bond, James Bond	

===== Newcastle =====
Year	Winner		Notes
Year	School	Musical item	Notes
1998	All Saints', Maitland (St Peter's campus)		
2001	All Saints', Maitland (St Peter's campus)		
2006	St Peter's Catholic College		

Open Division
Year	1st		2nd		Notes
Year	School	Musical item	School	Musical item	Notes
2007	St Peter's Catholic College		Lisarow High		

RAW Division
Year	1st		2nd		Notes
Year	School	Musical item	School	Musical item	Notes
2007	Toronto High		Macquarie PCYC		

===== Wollongong =====
Premier Division
Year	1st		2nd		3rd		Notes
Year	School	Musical item	School	Musical item	School	Musical item	Notes
2007	St Joseph's Catholic High		Smith's Hill High		Bomaderry High		
2011	MLC School		Smith's Hill High (Years 10, 11 & 12 only)		Cranebrook High		

=== Queensland ===
==== Finals held in Brisbane ====
Year	1st		2nd		3rd		Notes
Year	School	Musical item	School	Musical item	School	Musical item	Notes
1984	Sunnybank State High	Relax	Ipswich Girls Grammar	Fashion	Warwick State High	Look Back in Anger	1985 Winners Sunnybank High Two Tribes
1991	Miami State High	Pinball Wizard					
1992	Nerang State High School	The Liberation 1st place		Dakabin State High School 2nd place		Kawana Waters State High School 3rd place	
1993	Miami State High	I got Life 3rd place					
1994	Miami State High	Television the Drug of the Nation 1st Place					
1994	Nerang State High School	Beach Sun Surf 4th place					
1997	Ferny Grove State High	Salome – Dance of Death	Keebra Park State High	I Believe in a God that can Dance	Elanora State High	Tibet – The Chinese Invasion of Tibet	
1998	Shailer Park State High	Atlantis – The Lost City	Keebra Park State High	The Spirit of Ireland	Miles State High	Awaken The Spirits	
1999	Keebra Park State High	Save the day					
2000	Bundaberg North State High						

Open Division
Year	1st		2nd		3rd		Notes
Year	School	Musical item	School	Musical item	School	Musical item	Notes
1995	Beenleigh State High		Kelvin Grove State High		Shailer Park State High		
1996	Alexandra Hills State High	Child abuse Living on the Edge of a Rainbow					
2002	Palm Beach Currumbin State High		Dalby District		Ferny Grove State High		
2003	Harristown State High		Elanora State High		Marist College Ashgrove		
2004	Palm Beach Currumbin State High		Alexandra Hills State High		Beenleigh State High		
2005	Harristown State High		Beaudesert State High		Keebra Park State High		
2006	Marist College Ashgrove	Born To Be Wild	Bundaberg North State High		Palm Beach-Currumbin State High		
2011	Harristown State High						
2012	Craigslea State High		Riverside State				

Premier Division
Year	1st		2nd		3rd		Notes
Year	School	Musical item	School	Musical item	School	Musical item	Notes
1996	Elanora State High	Aztec Cycle of the Sun	Miami State High	Don't Dice Think Twice	Kawana Waters State High	Wildthings	

RAW Division
Year	Winner		Notes
Year	School	Musical item	Notes
2011	Lowood State High		
2012	Mitchelton State High		

Small Team Division
Year	Winner		Notes
Year	School	Musical item	Notes
2002	Jandowae State		
2005	Whites Hill State College		
2004	Jandowae State		

==== Finals held in regional Queensland ====
===== Cairns =====
Open Division
Year	1st		2nd		3rd		Notes
Year	School	Musical item	School	Musical item	School	Musical item	Notes
2003	Malanda State High		Trinity Bay College		Kirwan State High		
2006	Cairns State High						
2008	Cairns State High						

===== Gold Coast =====
Open Division
Year	1st		2nd		3rd		Notes
Year	School	Musical item	School	Musical item	School	Musical item	Notes
2008	King's Christian College						

===== Rockhampton =====
Open Division
Year	1st		2nd		3rd		Notes
Year	School	Musical item	School	Musical item	School	Musical item	Notes
2006	Yeppoon State High		Glenmore State High		Mundubbera State School		

===== Toowoomba =====
Open Division
Year	1st		2nd		3rd		Notes
Year	School	Musical item	School	Musical item	School	Musical item	Notes
2006	Warwick State High		West Moreton Anglican College				

Small Team
Year	Winner		Notes
Year	School	Musical item	Notes
2004	Jandowae State School		

===== Townsville =====
Open Division
Year	Winner		Notes
Year	School	Musical item	Notes
1999	St Margaret Mary's College		

Open Division
Year	Winner		Notes
Year	School	Musical item	Notes
2006	Ayr State High		

=== South Australia ===
Open Division
Year	1st		2nd		3rd		Notes
Year	School	Musical item	School	Musical item	School	Musical item	Notes
1996	Morphett Vale High	Simply Individual					
1999	Seaview High	High Hopes	Banksia Park International High				
2000	Hallett Cove		Woodville High				
2001	Seymour College		Banksia Park International High		Maitland Area School		
2002	Seaview High		Sacred Heart College		Brighton Secondary		
2003	Brighton Secondary		St George College		Banksia Park International High		
2004	Brighton Secondary		Woodville High		Salisbury High		
2005	Sacred Heart College		Woodville High		Brighton Secondary		
2006	Brighton Secondary	Flight of Fancy	Seaford 6–12 School	21st Century Vitruvian Man	Bordertown High	Then there were none	
2007	Woodville High		Brighton Secondary		Salisbury High		
2008	Brighton Secondary		Bordertown High		Blackwood High		
2012	Kangaroo Island Community Education Centre		Blackwood High				

Small Team Division
Year	1st		2nd		3rd		Notes
Year	School	Musical item	School	Musical item	School	Musical item	Notes
2002	Trinity College Blakeview						
2004	Murray Bridge High		Bordertown High		Trinity College Gawler		
2005	Gleeson College						

=== Tasmania ===
Year	1st		2nd		3rd		Notes
Year	School	Musical item	School	Musical item	School	Musical item	Notes
1996	Glenora District High						
1997	Taroona High	Spiritual Ritual Tribal Habitual					
2000	Ogilvie High						
2002	St Patrick's, Launceston		Launceston College				
2003	Newstead College		Rosetta High		Bridgewater High		
2004	St Patrick's, Launceston		Launceston College		Bridgewater College		

Open Division
Year	1st		2nd		3rd		Notes
Year	School	Musical item	School	Musical item	School	Musical item	Notes
2005	St Patrick's, Launceston; Launceston Church Grammar				Riverside High		
2006	St Patrick's, Launceston	Clear The Way	Kings Meadows School		Scotch Oakburn College		[held in Launceston]
2007	Riverside High		Newstead College		Rosetta High		
2011	Launceston Church Grammar		Riverside High				
2012	St Patrick's, Launceston		King's Christian College				

RAW Division
Year	Winner		Notes
Year	School	Musical item	Notes
2006	St Patrick's, Launceston	Amazed	
2007	St Patrick's, Launceston		

Small Team Division
Year	Winner		Notes
Year	School	Musical item	Notes
2002	Devonport High		

=== Victoria ===
Year	1st		2nd		3rd		Notes
Year	School	Musical item	School	Musical item	School	Musical item	Notes
1987	Pakenham Secondary						
1989	Haileybury College	Wild Boys					
1991	Belmont High	Amadeus					
1992	Belmont High School	JFK					
1993	Langwarrin Secondary College	Pure Imagination'	Lowther Hall Anglican	Playing to Win	Boronia Heights Secondary	Creation, Mechanisation and Imagination	

Open Division
Year	1st		2nd		3rd		Notes
Year	School	Musical item	School	Musical item	School	Musical item	Notes
1994	Timboon P12 School						
1995	Mount Eliza Secondary	The Magic of Camelot	Echuca High	Gaia’s Vengence	Our Lady of Mercy College	Creation	
1996	Fairhills High	We Came in Peace	Academy of Mary Immaculate	Fitzroy Festival	Western Heights College	Dragon Slayer	
1997	St Francis Xavier College		Strathmore Secondary		Timboon P-12 School		
1998	Melton Secondary College	Russian Revolution					
1999	Mount Clear Secondary College	Lindy Chamberlain					
2000	Parkdale Secondary College	Choose Life	Geelong Northern Education Complex		Beaconhills College		
2001	St Columba's College	The American Dream	Traralgon Secondary College	Gazuntite			
2002	Gisborne Secondary		Mowbray Secondary		Coomoora Secondary		
2003	Penleigh and Essendon Grammar		Mount St Joseph Girls' College		Emerald Secondary		
2004	Tintern Schools		Northcote High	Where Art Thou?	Hampton Park Secondary		
2005	Emerald Secondary	Beware The Dragon	Benalla Youth Group Performers	Hot Time in the Old Town Tonight	Our Lady of The Sacred Heart, Bentleigh	Time Equals Change, Or Does It?	
2006	Brunswick Secondary	Overload	Pakenham Secondary	Gaia	Rowville Secondary	Retrogradation (Life in Reverse)	
2007	St Helena Secondary	Such Is Life	Gisborne Secondary	Make Poverty History	Echuca College	Head Trip	
2008	Mordialloc Secondary	After The Thunder	Lara Secondary	Frida	Echuca College	The Story of Mother Theresa	
2009	The Knox School		Gladstone Park Secondary	Diamonds Are Forever	Penleigh and Essendon Grammar	Hotel Rwanda	
2011	Knox United	No One Mourns the Wicked	Montmorency Secondary		Gladstone Park Secondary		
2012	Parade College		Eltham High				

Premier Division
Year	1st		2nd		3rd		Notes
Year	School	Musical item	School	Musical item	School	Musical item	Notes
1994	St Columba's College	Mediogre	Belmont High	They Said It Could Never Happen	St Bernard's College	Tour de France	
1995	Lowther Hall Anglican Grammar; Bellarine Secondary	Lest We Forget; Prohibition Friction	Langwarrin Secondary	Oklahoma	Werribee Secondary College	Noah's Ark	
1996	Monterey Secondary	Batmania	St Columba's College	The X-Files Conspiracy	Langwarrin Secondary	Don't Stop The Rain	
1997	Bellarine Secondary	Something Wicked This Way Comes	Shelford Girls'	Silence of the Lambs	Belmont High	Chariots of the Gods	
1998	Western Heights College	Crime & Cupid in Cuba	Bellarine Secondary	Platform 2000	Monterey Secondary	Thunderbirds Are Go	
1999	Penleigh and Essendon Grammar	China – Awakening Dragon	Pascoe Vale Girls' Secondary	Virtual Excursion	Mt Eliza Secondary College	A Little Bit of This, A Little Bit of That	
2000	Monterey Secondary	The Ice Maiden	Bellarine Secondary	Mystery Flight – Destination Unknown	Western Heights College	A Night at Coco's	
2001	Bellarine Secondary	With A Turn of the Page	Parkdale Secondary	Bound	Western Heights College	Perdu Dans La Cite – Lost in the City of Love	
2002	Werribee Secondary	Howzat	Melton Secondary	Gentlemen Prefer Blondes	Belmont High	Public Enemy No.1	
2003	St Columba's College	Cabaret Australia	Parkdale Secondary	Politix the Cabaret	Bellarine Secondary		
2004	Bellarine Secondary	The Voice Within	Fairhills High	Spellbound	Gisborne Secondary	Who Are You?	
2005	Fairhills High	Hypothesis: 2084	Penleigh and Essendon Grammar	Painted Land	Bellarine Secondary	Gone But Not Forgotten	
2006	St Columba's College	Fear or No Fear	Fairhills High	The Greatest Show on Earth	De La Salle, Malvern	Rhythm and Soul	
2007	Brunswick Secondary	Solstice	Fairhills High	Japanime	Emerald Secondary	Labyrinth	
2008	Fairhills High	Oceania	St Columba's College	Women's Rites	Brunswick Secondary	Glitch	
2009	Fairhills High	Bon Appetit	Pascoe Vale Girls'	The Masks We Wear	Parkdale Secondary	The Dream Stealers	
2011	Brunswick Secondary College	Submerged	Lara Secondary	Peter and the Wolf	Overnewton Anglican	The Strange Case...	
2012	St Columba’s College; Fairhills High				Brunswick Secondary		

RAW Division
Year	1st		2nd		3rd		Notes
Year	School	Musical item	School	Musical item	School	Musical item	Notes
2006	Kilbreda College						
2007	Elisabeth Murdoch College						
2009	Overnewton Anglican	Leaving Home	Western Heights College		Bendigo Senior Secondary	Flash Point	
2011	Gisborne Secondary		Our Lady of The Sacred Heart, Bentleigh		Echuca College		
2012	Kilbreda College and St Bede's College		Bendigo Senior Secondary		Lyndhurst Secondary		

Small Team Division
Year	Winner		Notes
Year	School	Musical item	Notes
2002	Gilmore College for Girls		
2003	Benalla Youth Group Performers		
2004	Brunswick Secondary		
2005	Bacchus Marsh Grammar		
2006	Maranatha Christian College	Prodigal's Daughter	

=== Western Australia ===
Year	1st		2nd		3rd		Notes
Year	School	Musical item	School	Musical item	School	Musical item	Notes
1992	Carine Senior High		Penrhos College		Armadale Senior High		
1993	Bunbury Senior High	Changing Channels – Will the Family Survive?	Mercedes College		Penrhos College	Choices – Past, Present and Future	
1994	Padbury Senior High	Blackboard Jungle	Perth Modern	Let The Ocean Nourish Our Existence	Mandurah Senior High	Stars and Stripes Stereotyped	
1995	Penrhos College	Life is Just a Bowl of Cherries	Cannington Senior High		Mandurah Senior High	Dorothy Downunder – The Making of Oz	
1996	Guildford Grammar	Fashion Frenzy	Perth Modern	Technology: Helpful or Deceitful?	Mandurah Senior High	Celebrations	
1997	Perth Modern	Berlin	Ocean Reef High School	Multiculturalism			

Open Division
Year	1st		2nd		3rd		Notes
Year	School	Musical item	School	Musical item	School	Musical item	Notes
2001	John Septimus Roe Anglican Community School		Como Secondary		Perth Modern		
2002	Como Secondary		Willetton Senior High		Balga Senior High		
2003	Belridge Senior High		Como Secondary		Duncraig Senior High		
2004	Servite College		Perth Modern		Como Secondary		
2005	Belridge Senior High		John Curtin College of the Arts		Como Secondary		
2006	Lesmurdie Senior High	Jekyll & Pride	Como Secondary		Perth Modern		
2007	Belridge Senior High		Canning Vale College		Governor Stirling Senior High		
2008					Como Secondary		
2009			Como Secondary				
2011	Swan View Senior High		Perth Modern				

RAW Division
Year	Winner		Notes
Year	School	Musical item	Notes
2006	Rossmoyne Senior High		
2011	Kalgoorlie-Boulder Community School		

Small Team Division
Year	Winner		Notes
Year	School	Musical item	Notes
2002	Servite College		
2004	Kearnan College		
2006	Kalgoorlie-Boulder Community School		

== Graphs ==
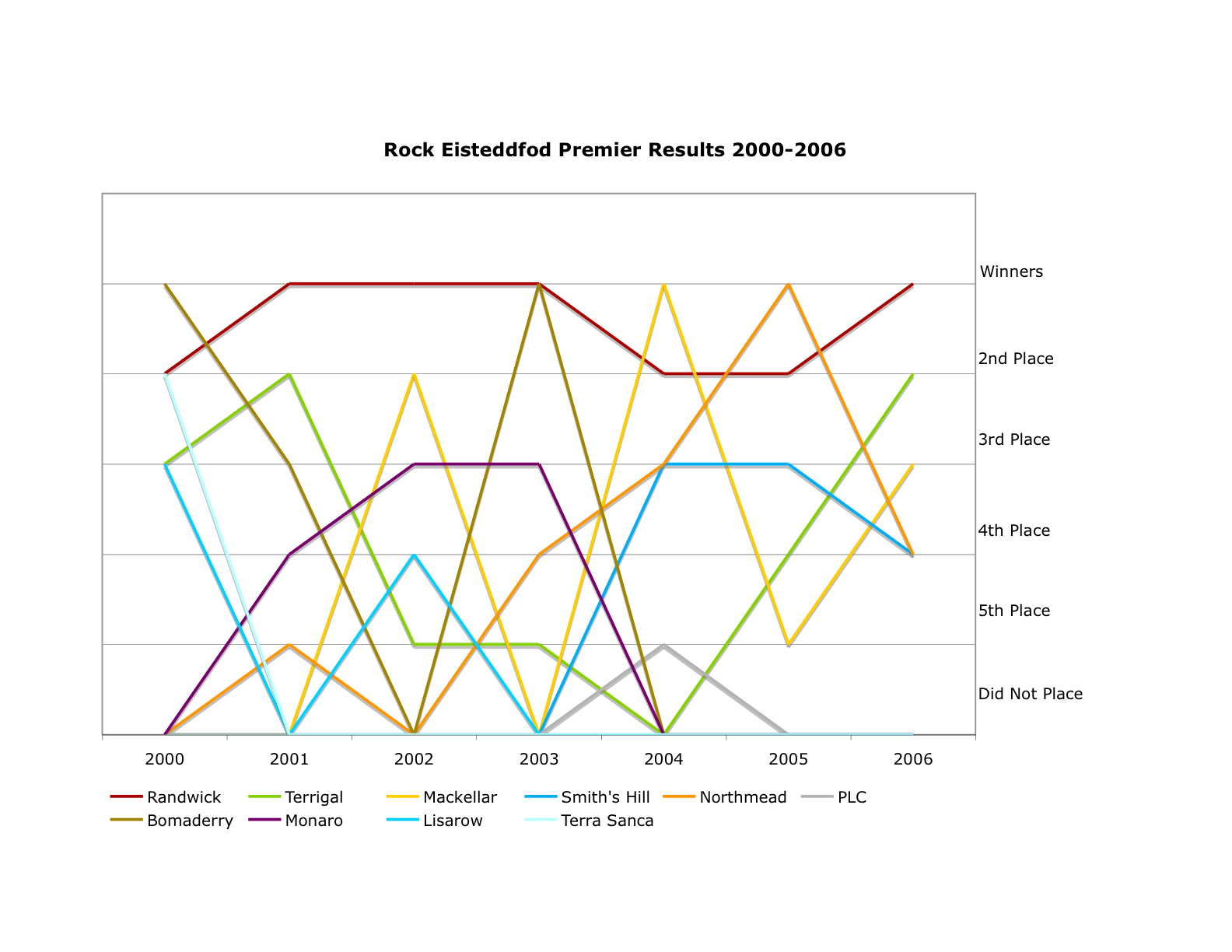
Sydney Premier Results 2000–2006

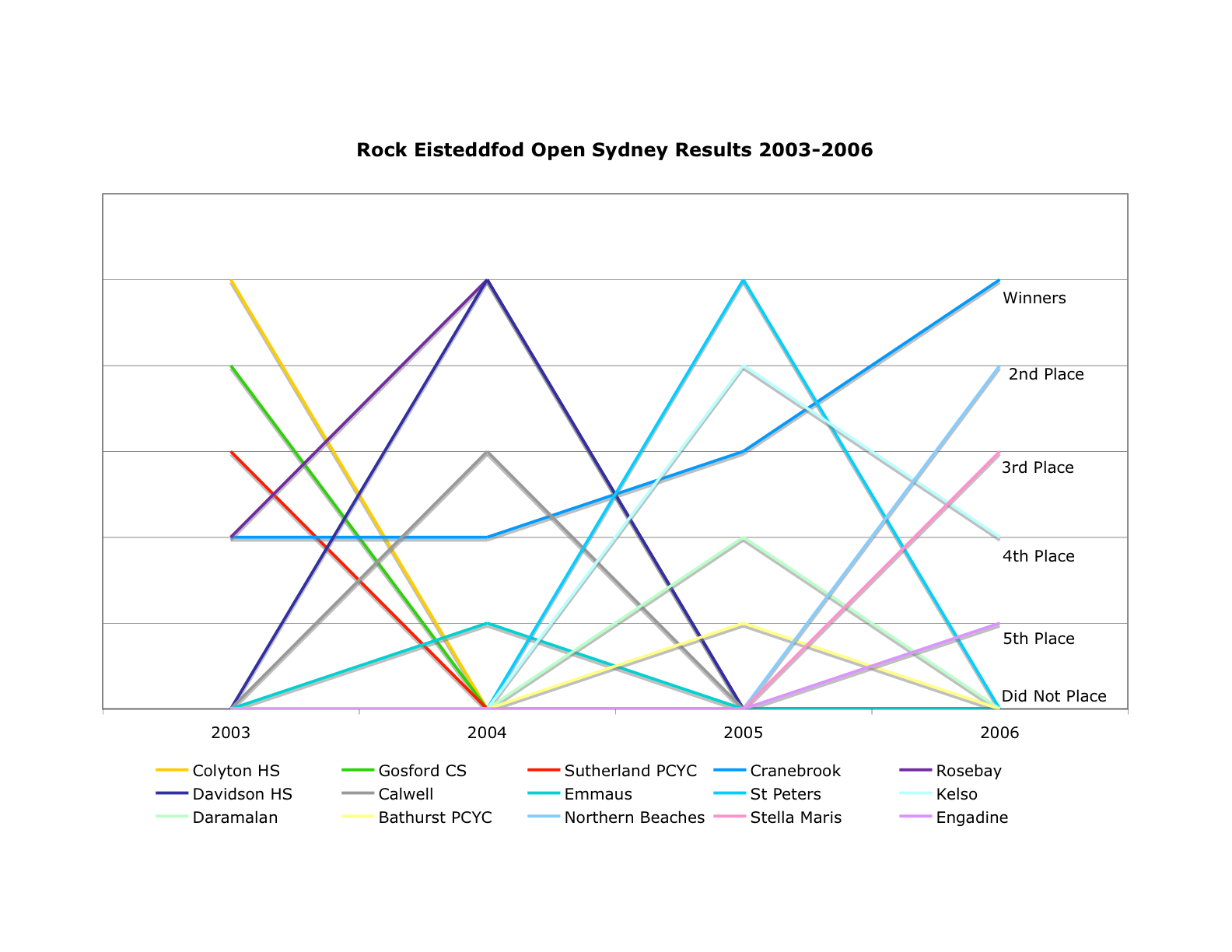
Sydney Open Results 2003–2006
