= Select Entry Accelerated Learning =

Australian secondary school program

A Select Entry Accelerated Learning (SEAL) program is a form of streaming used in government secondary schools in Victoria, Australia to provide a focused educational environment for academically gifted children.

The program allows students to undertake Year 8 work in Year 7, and the option to complete their secondary education in five years instead of six, or students can choose to undertake a more comprehensive Victorian Certificate of Education that takes three years instead of two.

In 2016, the Department of Education stopped accrediting the SEAL program, with a spokesman saying that schools that offer the program should offer enrolment to local students before students outside the school's zoning region.

== Controversies ==
As a form of streaming, SEAL programs by their very nature attract criticism from those committed to the principles of comprehensive education. Additionally, because they are not offered by every school, the schools that run them are argued to take away the top students from schools that don't, thus leading to a pool of less diverse schools and a concentration of bright students in a small number of schools.

== Schools with SEAL programs ==
Secondary schools in Victoria offering SEAL programs:

- Albert Park College
- Auburn High School
- Balwyn High School
- Bayswater Secondary College
- Bellarine Secondary College
- Belmont High School
- Blackburn High School
- Box Hill High School
- Brighton Secondary College
- Brunswick Secondary College
- Canterbury Girls' Secondary College
- Chaffey Secondary College
- Dandenong High School
- Doncaster Secondary College
- Emerald Secondary College
- Fairhills High School
- Footscray High School
- Gladstone Park Secondary College
- Glen Eira College
- Gleneagles Secondary College
- Horsham College
- Kambrya College
- Keilor Downs College
- Lilydale High School
- Lyndale Secondary College
- Matthew Flinders Girls Secondary College
- Mill Park Secondary College
- Mordialloc Secondary College
- Mount Clear College
- Mount Erin Secondary College
- North Geelong Secondary College
- Pascoe Vale Girls College
- Reservoir High School
- Rosebud Secondary College
- Sale College
- Sandringham College
- St Albans Secondary College
- Springside West Secondary College
- Staughton College
- Trafalgar High School
- University High School
- Victoria University Secondary College
- Wangaratta High School
- Warrnambool College
- Werribee Secondary College
- Williamstown High School
- Wodonga Middle Years College
- Wonthaggi Secondary College
