= Sione Tuipulotu (rugby union, born February 1997) =

Scottish rugby union player (born 1997)

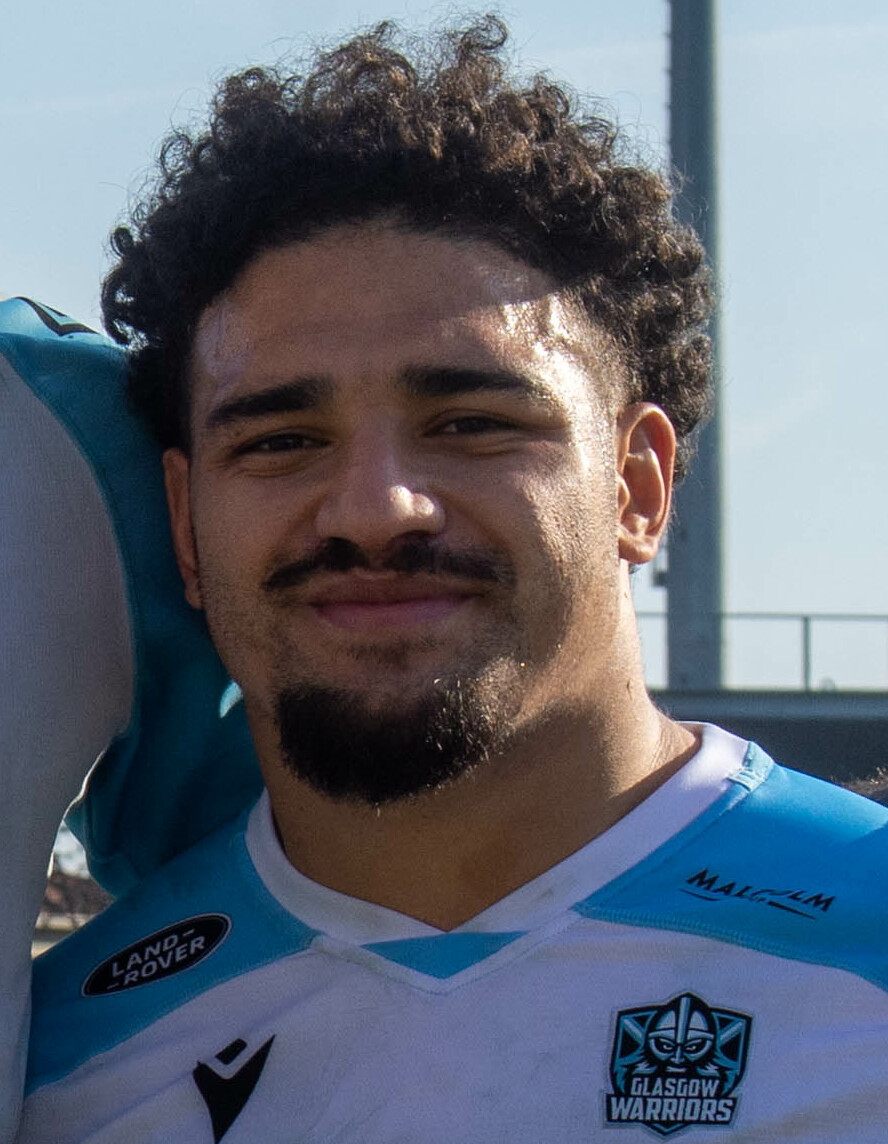
- Tuipulotu representing Glasgow Warriors during the United Rugby Championship
- Born: 12 February 1997 (age 29) Frankston, Victoria, Australia
- Height: 1.78 m (5 ft 10 in)
- Weight: 104 kg (229 lb; 16 st 5 lb)
- School: Elisabeth Murdoch College; St. Kevin's College
- Notable relative(s): Mosese Tuipulotu (brother); Tavi Tuipulotu (brother)

Rugby union career
- Position: Centre
- Current team: Glasgow Warriors
Senior career
Years	Team	Apps	(Points)
2015–2018	Melbourne Rising	32	(64)
2016–2019	Rebels	12	(0)
2018–2021	Yamaha Júbilo	17	(15)
2019	Eastern Suburbs	3	(10)
2021–	Glasgow Warriors	68	(50)
- Correct as of 2 August 2025
International career
Years	Team	Apps	(Points)
2015–2017	Australia U20	14	(20)
2021–	Scotland	42	(20)
2022	Scotland 'A'	1	(0)
2025	British & Irish Lions	1	(5)
- Correct as of 18 November 2026

Sione Tuipulotu (born 12 February 1997) is an Australian-born Scottish professional rugby union player who plays as a centre for United Rugby Championship club Glasgow Warriors. Born and raised in Australia, he is the current captain of the Scotland national rugby union team after qualifying on ancestry grounds.

He was raised by a Tongan father and an Australian mother of Italian and Scottish descent. He grew up in Frankston, Victoria and first played rugby at Southern Districts Rugby Club in Seaford. He attended local public school Elisabeth Murdoch College before moving to private school St Kevin's College, Melbourne on a scholarship.

== Club career ==
He made his debut for the Rebels against the Queensland Reds as a late replacement for Tamati Ellison in a 25–23 win for the Rebels, becoming the first ever 'home-grown' player to play for the Rebels.

He signed for the Japanese side Yamaha Júbilo with the intention of playing there in Super Rugby's off-season.

On 1 March 2021 it was announced that Tuipulotu would join Glasgow Warriors at the end of the Japanese Top league season. Tuipuloto said of the move: "I think my play style suit the Warriors' style. I’m a bit of a rugby nerd and I’ve watched a lot of their games – I’ve heard a lot about the speed of the Scotstoun pitch and I’m looking forward to playing that attacking fast style of rugby." Warriors Head Coach Danny Wilson said: "Sione is an exciting talent. He’s Scottish-qualified, and a really physical and powerful ball carrier who can play both centre and wing. His skill set and play style compliments the way we want to play."

He made his debut for the Glasgow club in the 'Clash of the Warriors' pre-season fixture against English side Worcester Warriors at their Sixways Stadium. The Glasgow Warriors won out, winning the match 27 – 22 and taking home the inaugural cup. He made his competitive debut for Glasgow in the 24 September 2021 match against Ulster away at Ravenhill Stadium in the United Rugby Championship – earning the Glasgow Warrior No. 332. With the Glasgow Warriors Tuipulotu won the 2023–24 United Rugby Championship, playing in the starting lineup of the final against the Bulls.

== International career ==
=== Scotland ===
Tuipulotu qualifies for Scotland via a grandmother from Greenock. In June 2021, Tuipulotu was called up to the Scotland squad for the summer internationals. He was selected to start against Tonga in the match scheduled for 29 October 2021.

He made his Scotland debut against Tonga on 30 October 2021. Scotland won the match 60–14.

He was capped by Scotland 'A' on 25 June 2022 in their match against Chile.

He scored his first Scotland points with two tries against Argentina on 19 November 2022.

In 2023, Tuipolotu was selected in Scotland's 33 player squad for the 2023 Rugby World Cup in France.

In October 2024, he was named as the Scotland Captain for the 2024 Autumn Internationals. He was joined in the squad for the first time by his brother Mosese. In November 2024, he captained the side, scoring a try against Australia as they went to win 27–13 to reclaim the Hopetoun Cup.

=== British and Irish Lions ===
In May 2025, Tuipulotu was selected by Head Coach Andy Farrell for the 2025 British & Irish Lions tour to Australia. He made his Lions debut during the first warm-up match, a 24–28 defeat to Argentina in Dublin, on 20 June 2025, becoming Lion #863. He scored the opening try in the 27–19 victory during the opening test match of the series.

== Career statistics ==
=== List of international tries ===
==== Scotland ====
No.	Date	Venue	Opponent	Score	Result	Competition
1	19 November 2022	Murrayfield Stadium, Edinburgh, Scotland	Argentina	5–3	52–29	2022 end-of-year rugby union internationals
2	19 November 2022	Murrayfield Stadium, Edinburgh, Scotland	Argentina	29–22	52–29	2022 end-of-year rugby union internationals
3	24 November 2024	Murrayfield Stadium, Edinburgh, Scotland	Australia	5-3	27–13	2024 end-of-year rugby union internationals
4	4 July 2026	Estadio Mario Alberto Kempes, Córdoba, Argentina	Argentina	5-7	38-47	Nations Championship

as of 6 July 2026

==== British & Irish Lions ====
No.	Date	Venue	Opponent	Score	Result	Competition
1	19 July 2025	Lang Park, Brisbane, Australia	Australia	0–8	19–27	2025 British & Irish Lions tour to Australia

as of 19 July 2025
