= Parkdale Secondary College =

Coordinates: 37°59′27″S 145°05′41″E

- Mordialloc, Victoria; Australia

Information
- Type: Public, co-ed, day school
- Motto: Latin: Pergo Et Perago (I undertake and I achieve)
- Denomination: Secular
- Established: 1964
- Principal: Michael Tuck
- Staff: 124
- Years: 7–12
- Enrolment: 1,721
- Colours: Blue, green and yellow
- Website: parkdalesc.vic.edu.au

Parkdale Secondary College is a public, co-educational secondary school located on Warren Road in the Melbourne suburb of Mordialloc, Victoria.

The modern college has been rebuilt and completed the first and second stages of a major upgrade that includes an early learning centre.

== Overview ==
Parkdale Secondary College is a year 7–12 public secondary college with an enrolment of approximately 1,800 students. Parkdale is involved in the iiNet program of RATL (Remote Access To Learning), which allows international students to study at the school. Parkdale also has a sister school in Japan called Nishi High School.

The college has dedicated enrichment pathways including ESP (Elite Sports Pathways), AEP (Arts Enrichment Pathway) and STEP (Science Technology Engineering Pathway).

Parkdale Secondary College's median subject study score for 2008 was 30, with 5% of the students receiving a score of above 40; and over the past decades the median study score has remained consistent with this, being 30 in 2024 and 29 in 2025. They were ranked the 222nd school in the state in 2008, reaching the 188th ranking in 2024.

In October 2024, the school celebrated its 60th anniversary.

== Principals ==
- John F Dower (1963–1967) founding principal
- R G Gilmour (1968–1973)
- L D Thomson (1974–1978, 1980)
- M J O'Brien (1979, 1981–82, 1983–1986)
- D Stewart (1987)
- Philip Knight (1988–2006)
- Greg McMahon (2007–2014)
- Debby Chaves (2014–2017)
- David Russell (2017–2026)
- Michael Tuck (2026–current)

== History ==
Parkdale High School was established in 1964. In its first year, it was located in four prefabricated classrooms within the grounds of Mordialloc Secondary College and although it shared some facilities it was run as a separate school by principal John F Dower with five teachers and 78 students. After a late start to the year 1965, the buildings on the present site were completed sufficiently for occupation by the now two school levels (then known as forms 1 and 2) and comprised approximately 200 students.

In 1989 the name of the school changed to Parkdale Secondary College. During the time Phil Knight was principal, the school grew from approximately 400 students in 1988 to 1025 students in 2006 and under Greg McMahon it grew from 1100 to over 1789 students.

== Facilities ==
- Indoor sporting facilities / sports stadium
- Basketball courts and stadium
- External playing courts
- Outdoor playing fields
- Theatre and performing arts facilities
- Library
- Junior Learning Centre with 18 teaching spaces
- Multipurpose teaching spaces
- English Language Centre
- Careers resource centre
- Wellbeing and first-aid facilities
- Technology and specialist learning facilities
- Music and performing arts facilities
- Visual arts facilities
- Science, technology and engineering facilities
- Community Children’s Hub

== Sport ==
Represented by the Parky Seahorse, Parkdale competes in the Beachside District in athletics, swimming, cross-country and alternative sports. The Mordialloc-Braeside Football Club was formed in February 1969 by three 13-year-old students of the then Parkdale High School, which included Peter Moait, (later Kingston mayor) John Ronke and Dean Carroll.

=== SSV championships ===
Parkdale has won the following School Sport Victoria state championships.

Boys:

- Football (Year 7) – 2013
- Football (Senior) – 2014, 2016 (2)
- Football (Intermediate) – 2016
- Rugby League (Junior) – 2011

Girls:

- Football (Junior) – 2019
- Netball (Year 7) – 2014
- Soccer (Intermediate) – 2019
- Soccer (Year 8) – 2017

Mixed:

- Baseball (Intermediate) – 2018
- Baseball (Year 8) – 2013, 2017 (2)
- Baseball (Year 7) – 2012, 2016 (2)
- Basketball (Year 8) – 2008
- Cricket (Year 8) – 2004, 2005 (2)
- Golf (Senior) – 2014
- Hockey (Year 7) – 2018

== Arts ==
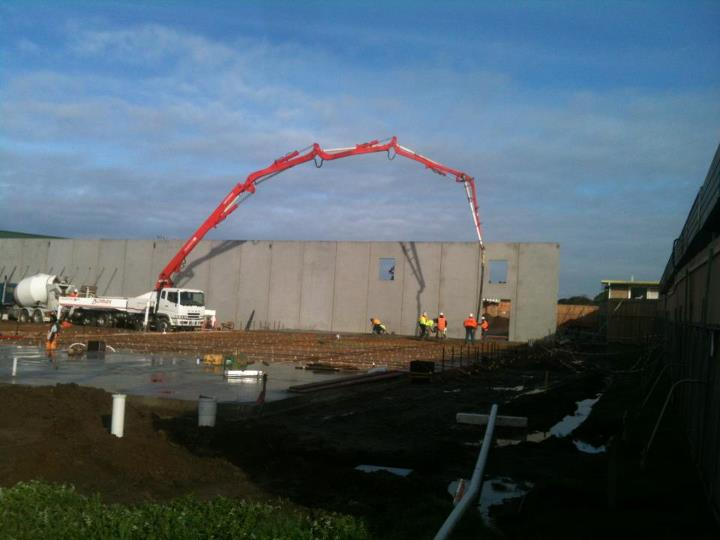
A newer art centre and gymnasium were completed as part of 'stage two' of the college upgrades

=== School productions ===
Andrew Mullett, a teacher at the school, has directed the annual school play since 1983; his recent additions include those below:

- 2025 - School of Rock
- 2024 - Freaky Friday
- 2023 - All Shook Up
- 2013 – Promises/Taking Stock
- 2011 – A Rum Business
- 2010 – Going Forward
- 2009 – Shady Deals
- 2008 – The Night Shift
- 2007 – Lost for Words
- 2006 – Perspectives

=== Rock Eisteddfod ===
Parkdale competes in the National Rock Eisteddfod biennially. Most recently, the 2009 entry, Dream Stealers, was awarded third in the grand final, and received a wildcard into the National TV Special Results. In the 2007 entry Parkdale positioned 3rd in the Premier Division and was a wildcard in the 2007 National TV Special Results. The 2005 entry positioned 4th in the Premier Division Grand Placings, and was the Victorian state winner of the National TV Special Results.

Former public school bulletin board.

== Notable alumni ==
- Harley Balic – former AFL player for the Fremantle Football Club and the Melbourne Football Club
- Michael Clarke – Melbourne Cup winning jockey
- Heath Davidson – Paralympian
- Tom Lamb – former AFL player for the West Coast Football Club
- Nicole Livingstone – Olympian
- Peter Slade – former VFL/AFL player for the Melbourne Football Club
- Peter Williamson – former VFL/AFL player for the Melbourne Football Club
- Jesse Wyatt – Paralympian
- Greg James - radio announcer (3KZ, 3BA, 4GG, 4KQ, 4BH, 7HT)

== See also ==
- List of high schools in Victoria
