= Toronto High School =

Toronto High School may refer to:

- Toronto Junior/Senior High School, a public secondary school in Toronto, Ohio, United States
- Toronto High School (New South Wales), a state school in Lake Macquarie, Australia

== See also ==
- Education in Toronto, listing high schools in Ontario, Canada
