= Peter Williamson =

Peter Williamson may refer to:

- Peter Williamson (memoirist) (1730–1799), a.k.a. "Indian Peter", Scottish memoirist who was part-showman, part-entrepreneur and inventor
- Peter Williamson (footballer) (born 1953), Australian rules footballer
- Peter J. Williamson (1823–1907), Dutch-American architect
- Pete Williamson (1946–1991), Canadian Olympic speed skater
