= Randwick Girls' High School =

Location
- Barker Street; Randwick, New South Wales, 2031; Australia; 33°55′19.12″S 151°14′21.65″E

Information
- Type: Public, secondary, day school
- Motto: Latin: Facta non Verba (Deeds, not Words.)
- Established: January 1959
- Closed: 2024
- Educational authority: New South Wales Education Standards Authority
- Oversight: New South Wales Department of Education
- Principal: Lucy Andre (former)
- Staff: 19
- Years offered: 7–12
- Enrolment: ~878 (7–12)
- Hours in school day: 6 hours
- Campus: Barker and Avoca Streets
- Colours: Gold, white and bottle green
- Website: Randwick Girls High School

Randwick Girls' High School (RGHS) was a girls' high school located in Randwick, New South Wales, Australia, between Barker and Avoca Streets. Established in January 1959, the school was operated by the New South Wales Department of Education with students from years 7 to 12. In 2025, the school amalgamated with the adjoining Randwick Boys High School to form 'Randwick High School' as a single co-educational campus.

== History and campus ==
The history of Randwick Girls High dates back to 1883, when Randwick Public School was established by the NSW Government. The school, to accommodate 200 students, was built on land at the top of Avoca Street, Randwick in 1886. The senior functions of the school became a Superior Public School in 1913, a Junior High School in 1944, and finally split with a Boys High School in 1949, who eventually moved further south down Avoca Street, joined later with the establishment of Randwick Girls' High School in 1959. Since the 1990s, Randwick Girls has participated in the Rock Eisteddfod Challenge jointly with its brother school, Randwick Boys High School. Many places have been gained by the combined team, first reaching the finals in 1995, being a regular finalist since that time, and winning the Premier Division in 2001, 2002, 2003, 2006, and 2007.

== Amalgamation with Randwick Boys High School ==
In September 2023, it was announced that adjoining sites of Randwick Girls and Randwick Boys High School would amalgamate into a single co-educational secondary school campus at a cost of $42 million, following pressure from parents.

== Notable alumni ==
- Tamsin Colley – paralympian
- Molly Contogeorge – singer-songwriter and keyboardist
- Vega Tamotia – actress

== See also ==
- List of government schools in New South Wales
- Rock Eisteddfod Challenge results (Australia)
