= Ben Jacobs (rugby union) =

Australian rugby union player (born 1982)

- Born: Ben Jacobs; 17 May 1982 (age 44) Sydney, New South Wales, Australia
- Height: 185 cm (6 ft 1 in)
- Weight: 98 kg (15 st 6 lb)
- School: Woolooware High School

Rugby union career
- Position: Outside Centre
Senior career
Years	Team	Apps	(Points)
2004–2008	Waratahs	34	(35)
2007	Central Coast Rays	10	(15)
2008/09	Saracens	3	(0)
2009–2011	Wasps RFC	59	(50)
2012/13	Kyuden Voltex	7	(5)
2013	Force	6	(0)
2013–2016	Wasps RFC	31	(20)
- Correct as of 15 July 2021

Ben Jacobs (born 17 May 1982) is a former Australian rugby union footballer who last played for Wasps RFC in the Aviva Premiership. Jacobs was a member of the inaugural ARC winning Central Coast Rays side in 2007.
