= Sylvania High School =

Coordinates: 34.0175681°S 151.1037095°E

Location
- Sylvania, New South Wales; Australia

Information
- School type: Public comprehensive coeducational secondary school
- Motto: Scholarship Honour Service
- Established: 1970
- Principal: Renée Holz
- Grades: 7–12
- Enrolment: 722 (2022)
- Website: sylvania-h.schools.nsw.gov.au

Sylvania High School (abbreviated as SHS) is a high school situated in the Sutherland Shire, in the Southeast region of Sydney, New South Wales. 793 students.

== History ==
Construction finished in January 1970, with the school opening that same year. It was not until 1976 that all 6 years (Years 7-12) were fully populated.

The school Was featured heavily in the 1979 book Puberty Blues cowritten by a former Sylvania High School student, Kathy Lette. It was considered controversial at the time.

In 1985 it won the Rock Eisteddfod Challenge.
