= Mount Erin College =

College in Victoria, Australia

Coordinates: 38°10′25″S 145°08′50″E

Mount Erin Secondary College is a secondary school located in the suburb of Frankston, Victoria, Australia. It has approximately 930 students and is the only school running the SEAL (Select Entry Accelerated Learning) program in the area. Other schools that run the program include Lyndale Secondary College and Wellington Secondary College.

== Campuses ==
The school was previously split into two separate campuses in 2005, one located on the original Frankston site and another newer campus in the nearby suburb of Somerville. The Somerville campus ran a year 7–10 programme with students progressing to Mount Erin Frankston to complete years 11 and 12 within the VCE or VCAL programs.

In 2009 the Somerville campus was separated from Frankston campus (the original campus), and became 'Somerville Secondary College'.

Mount Erin College offers a wide and diverse range of specialist programmes including the SEAL program, Sports and Arts Academies, MESEM (student council), and a one-to-one notebook program. It also has a successful student services program and caters for a wide range of student passions and interests. Mount Erin College also has Deaf Education Facilities, where students from the program are integrated into mainstream classes.

In 2012, Mount Erin College introduced its Sports Academy Program, where by students are selected for "excellence" and undertake classes and coaching suited to enhancing their athletic ability. As of 2017 it is a select entry program that runs across all levels in the school.

In 2013, Mount Erin College began its Performing Arts Academy in the performing and visual arts.

== Programmes and subjects ==
The College also offers technology classes in metal and plastics as well as electronics and robotics.

Mount Erin College runs a one-to-one notebook program and technology is incorporated into all student learning.

Mount Erin College draws students from a number of local primary schools, including Frankston Heights Primary and Kingsley Park Primary School, which are both within walking distance. Students come from Pearcedale, Baxter, as far south as Hastings and Bittern and as far north as Carrum Downs.

Mount Erin College has a Deaf Education Centre, enabling hearing-impaired students to access a full subject range. Aides work closely with students in classes containing hearing impaired students, to assist them in understanding and completing their work. Hearing-impaired students make up a small percentage of total students.

Indonesian is taught to all students for years 7 and 8, with further studies an option taken by many who excel in the subject. Recently the school hosted exchange students from Germany, Indonesia and Japan.

== Facilities ==
Mount Erin College completed a $9 million Stage One Building Program, in 2015. It provides facilities across science, art, technology and science. The College also has a Performing Arts Center/Auditorium and Food Technology rooms. The Arts are supported in these facilities which include a MacLab to enable industry level study in the area of photography and an enhanced Studio Art program.

The Science facilities include a 'superlab' enabling multiple classes to undertake practical work.

The school has vast, well kept grounds and gardens. A competition hockey field was completed early in term two 2019 and then work to demolish and rebuild a competition standard gymnasium for basketball began. There are many sporting areas including multi-purpose courts. The school has a large gym, with adjacent weights facility and separate change rooms.

The school also has an auditorium and performing arts centre that hosts the drama facility. Students have the opportunity to explore not only the acting side of drama, but also the backstage aspects such as lighting and stage craft.

The college also has music facilities.

== Notable alumni ==
- Matthew Millar – Footballer for Shrewsbury Town F.C.
- Nick Haynes – Footballer for Greater Western Sydney Giants
- Dougie Baldwin – Actor
