= Woolooware High School =

Location
- 2R Woolooware Road North; Woolooware, New South Wales; Australia; 34°02′23″S 151°08′41″E

Information
- Type: Public, unisex secondary
- Motto: Strive For Excellence
- Established: 1967
- Educational authority: New South Wales Education Standards Authority
- Oversight: New South Wales Department of Education
- Principal: Mardi Benson
- Grades: 7–12
- Enrolment: approx. 970
- Colours: Blue, white and black
- Website: woolooware-h.schools.nsw.gov.au

Woolooware High is a comprehensive secondary school in the Sutherland Shire, Sydney, Australia. It was established in 1967 and took its first class in January 1968.

Woolooware High is known for participation and success in performing arts, sport and science, technology, engineering, and mathematics. The school has had success in the Rock Eisteddfod Challenge.

Several students from WHS competed in and won the Science and Engineering Challenge, held at the Australian Nuclear Science and Technology Organisation.

Woolooware High became a participant in the White Ribbon program in 2014 and was officially accredited as a "White Ribbon" school in 2016.

== Notable alumni ==
- Selina Hornibrook, former NSW and Australian netball champion.
- Ben Jacobs, former rugby union player for NSW Waratahs and Western Force.
- Lauren Nicholson, basketball player in the WNBL and Australian Opals.
- Simon Pavey, motorcycle racer who competed in the Dakar Rally and co-star of Race to Dakar.
- Glenn Stevens, former governor of the Reserve Bank of Australia.
- Tahyna Tozzi, model and actress.
- Connor Tracey, professional rugby league player for the Cronulla-Sutherland Sharks.
- Todd Woodbridge, one of the most successful doubles tennis players of all time, now a sports broadcaster and television presenter.
