= Belmont High School (Victoria) =

Location
- Rotherham Street; Belmont, Victoria, 3216; Australia; 38.1769413°S 144.3295705°E

Information
- Type: Public high school
- Motto: Strive for the Highest
- Established: 1955
- Principal: Joshua Baker
- Faculty: Several
- Years offered: 7–12
- Enrolment: 5243 5355 (2019)
- Campus type: Suburban
- Colours: Green & white
- Website: www.bhs.vic.edu.au

Belmont High School is an Australian public high school located in Belmont, Victoria, a suburb in the city of Geelong. It is one of the largest public schools in Geelong. The school was established in 1955. As of 2019, it had an enrolment of over 1300 students from years 7 to 12.

== Location and facilities ==
The school has been progressively refurbished, with the most recent work costing $6.66 million and comprising new administration and staff areas, canteen, and four "learning centres".

A new Science-Technology centre called 'BioLab' was completed in 2010, and is accessible for schools throughout Geelong to utilise.

== Curriculum ==
The school offers a programme which includes a core curriculum in years 7 to 8 (English, Mathematics, Science, Italian, Indonesian, Technology, Arts, Studies of Society and Environment, Health and Physical Education). At years 9 to 12 a wide range of pathways are available. These include the Victorian Certificate of Education (VCE), Vocational Education Training (VET), Victorian Certificate of Applied Learning (VCAL) and school-based apprenticeships.

Belmont High School is one of 37 Victorian Government secondary schools providing a Select Entry Accelerated Learning programme to address the learning needs of their gifted and high potential students. This allows these students to begin VCE subjects in Year 9 and complete school a year earlier if they wish.

The school also offers specialised programmes catering for international students.

== Incidents ==
On 8 August 2008, a fire swept through a portable classroom. It took firefighters 40 minutes to control the blaze and another 90 minutes to fully damp down the site. One portable classroom was destroyed. There was also a fire in a science room, causing damage that had to be fixed over the start of the 2011 holidays.

On 19 April 2018, a shooting threat sent the school into lockdown. Police discovered that the threat was a hoax. Students were briefed on the situation and the day continued as normal.

== Notable alumni ==
- Chrissy Amphlett, Singer
- Esther Anderson, Gold Logie-nominated actress who portrays Charlie Buckton on Home and Away
- Portia de Rossi, actress
- Cheryl Baker, opera singer
- Mark Blake, AFL player
- Kelsey Browne, netballer
- Madison Browne, netballer
- Peter Coleman-Wright, opera singer
- Ian Cover, Coodabeens
- Brooke Davis, author
- Darcy Fort, AFL player for Geelong Cats and Brisbane Lions
- Adrian Leijer, Olympic Olyroo representative and Melbourne Victory player
- Tim O'Neill, CFL player
- Jasper Pittard, AFL player for North Melbourne and Port Adelaide
