= Echuca College =

Coordinates: 36°07′59″S 144°43′57″E

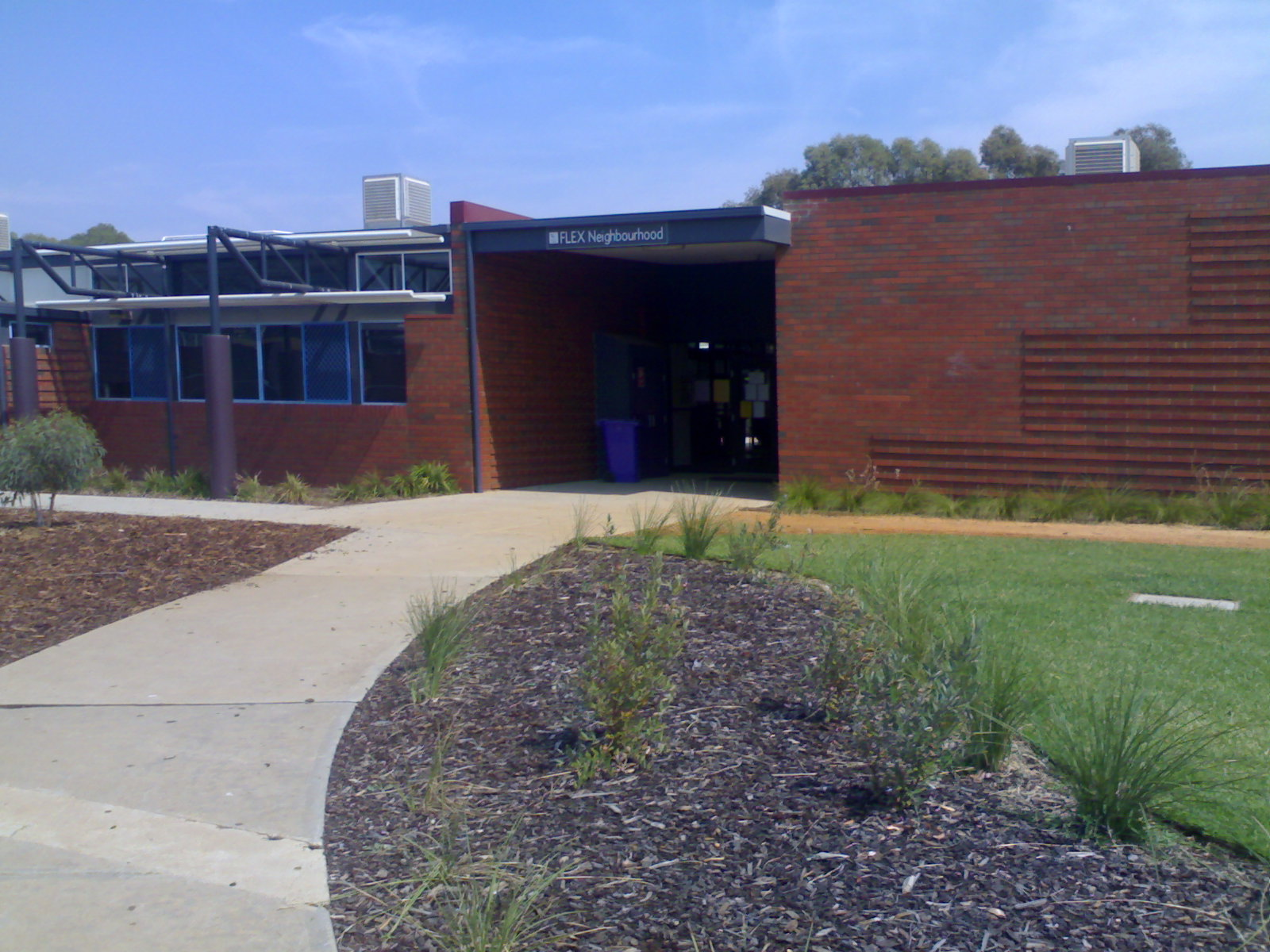
- Year 8 area, pictured in 2009
- Echuca, Victoria; Australia

Information
- Type: Government secondary school
- Motto: Diversity Our Strength
- Established: 2006; 20 years ago
- Principal: Jessica Sargeant
- Enrolment: ~1000
- Campus: Regional
- Colours: Purple and white
- Website: echucacollege.vic.edu.au

Echuca College is a state secondary school in Echuca, Victoria, Australia. It was established in 2006 by the merger of Echuca Secondary College and Echuca High School. The school is currently situated on one campus at Butcher Street.

== History ==
The history of the school dates back to the late 20th century when the school was known as Echuca Technical School. Echuca Technical School ceased to be a technical school in the early 1990s and moved to the Butcher Street site, where it remained as Echuca Secondary College until 2006 when it was merged with the other state secondary school in Echuca, Echuca High School. Echuca College received an A$15 million grant from the Victorian Government to transform the school to a 'state of the art' learning centre. Recently, Echuca College received another grant to help with landscaping.

Since 23 November 2009, Years 10 to 12 moved to the College Drive Campus. Echuca College is now situated on one campus. The Crofton Street Campus is managed by the Victorian Department of Education and Early Childhood Development.

=== Echuca High School ===
Echuca High School was a mid-sized government secondary school functioning between 1903 and 2005. Located to the north of Echuca's business district, the Echuca High School campus was situated at the end of Crofton Street and next to the Campaspe River. Sections of its facilities, particularly the sports fields, were prone to occasional flooding.

The school had a typical student enrolment in the 600s, catering from students between the ages of 12–18. The school motto was 'Play the Game' and its emblem featured two crossed boomerangs.

=== Echuca Secondary College ===
Echuca Secondary College was a mid-sized state secondary school. It was formerly known as Echuca Technical School or Echuca Tech and was established in the late 1880s. Echuca Tech ceased to be a technical school in the early 1990s and moved to the Butcher Street site, changing its name.

== Facilities ==
Echuca College has upgraded its facilities to be state-of-the-art and a great key advantage to students learning. Echuca College has upgraded their computer network, to cope with demands in the future. Purchased several hundreds of Dell laptops to be used learning aides for students. Smartboard was introduced as a learning tool for teachers & students along with sound systems and projectors in every classroom throughout the school.

They also have their own Manufacturing & Design workshop which is also state-of-the-art, incorporating many items that would be used in a normal workshop. They use a computer system called "OnGuard" which a student needs to read information about the certain tool that wishes to use and answer questions about how to use it and safety. Once they finished and they are all correct, the student is now licensed to use that tool in the workshop.

The Performing Arts Centre of the school incorporates and Drama & Dance room, music room & I.T. Room. The Dance & Drama room are made of floorboards and are also used for performances due to the very large space. The music room also has state of the art musical keyboards, drumkits, electronic drumkits, guitars, soundboards and mastering software. The I.T. Room incorporates Dell desktop computers with LCD monitors to be used in I.T classes or Production Art classes

== Academics ==
For L.O.T.E, they teach Indonesian and they have several Indonesian teachers, they are also trialing a new subject called Production Arts, which takes on the role of students producing a production to show to parents and others, this will take up to 14 weeks, depending on the time the teachers designate.

== Extracurricular activities ==
Echuca College came fifth in the 2009 Rock Eisteddfod.
