= Brunswick Secondary College =

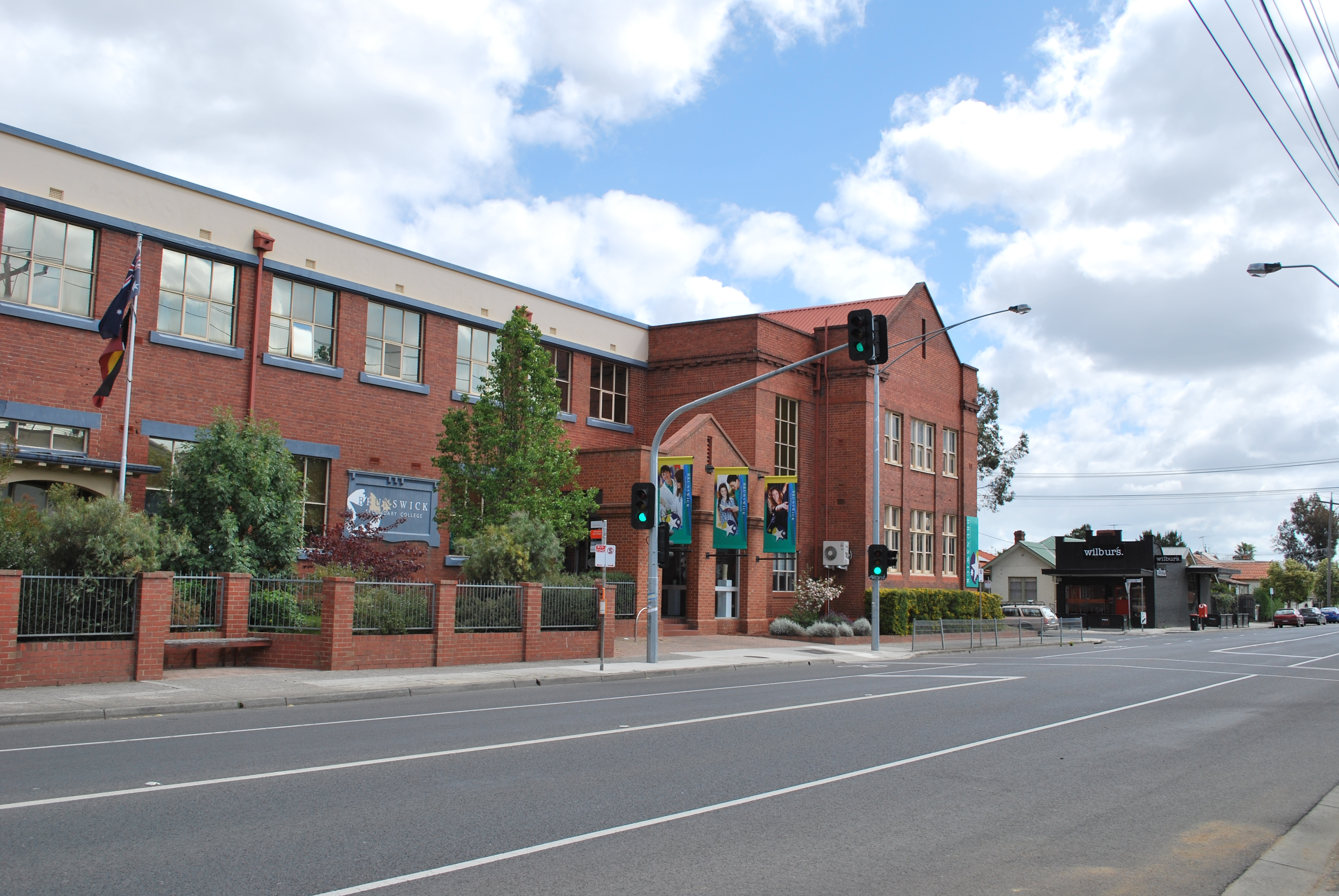
- Brunswick, Melbourne, Victoria; Australia

Information
- Type: Public high school
- Established: 1995; 31 years ago
- Principal: Karen Harris
- Teaching staff: 94
- Employees: 19 non-teaching
- Years: 7–12
- Enrolment: 900
- Colours: Purple, green and gold
- Publication: Brunswick Star (School newsletter)
- Website: www.brunswick.vic.edu.au

Brunswick Secondary College is a public high school located in the Melbourne suburb of Brunswick, Victoria, Australia. The school caters for students from Year 7 to Year 12.

== Curriculum ==
Brunswick Secondary offers a comprehensive curriculum from Year 7 to 12, and many electives and enrichment opportunities. In 2011, it introduced a Victorian Applied Learning Program (VCAL) into the curriculum, partnered with its Victorian Certificate of Education (VCE) curriculum. Brunswick Secondary has an active performing arts program, involved in many different areas including dance, drama and instrumental music. The school offers Mandarin Chinese and Italian as its Languages Other Than English. The school also ran a SEAL (Select Entry Accelerated Learning) Program, which was phased out in 2024 (There are no longer testing and grouping of students into a SEAL class, but already existing seal classes will continue until they reach their senior schooling) and a VCE Early Start Program. The school participates in the University of Melbourne's Mathematics Extension Program.

In addition to its core curricular subjects, Brunswick Secondary offers a rich extra-curricular program, including: dance, debating, drama, chess, circus, table tennis, Kendo, and creative writing. It boasts a high level of participation and achievement in these areas (and subject areas) through competitions.

Brunswick Secondary College also has a wide variety of elective subject choices for students in Year 9 & 10 ranging from subjects such as Food Tech, Woodwork, City Life and Bushwhacked.

=== Victorian Young Leaders to China Program ===
Brunswick Secondary is a participant in the Victorian Young Leaders to China (VYLC) Program and offers positions to Year 9 students learning Chinese. The VYLC Program is a world-class, six-week in-country immersion program for Year 9 students, designed to prepare them to live and work as citizens and future leaders in an inter-connected global community. The initiative contributes to Victoria as the Education State by developing the students’ global competencies. The program is a life-changing opportunity for students and teachers to live in and attend school in China. Combining language and cultural learning with personal development and leadership skills, the program focuses on one of Australia’s main trading partners, China.

== Facilities ==
Brunswick Secondary has many facilities allowing a wide curriculum with the many electives it offers. A new Year 9 Learning Centre was completed in early 2007 with new computers and teaching rooms with electronic whiteboards, which have since been installed in all classrooms throughout the school. In 2001, it was subject to a multimillion-dollar renovation, which saw many new facilities built. Since 2011, the school offers students in Years 10–12 laptops for hire throughout the academic year. The school features an organic garden, an auditorium, a gym, kitchens, and performing arts facilities such as a theatre. The school has a full size synthetic multipurpose field, completed in 2009, that is used by the school during the day and the Brunswick Hockey Club in the evenings. In 2018, the school was granted 10 million for renovation, kickstarting the building of a new food block which housed the new cafeteria, canteen and kitchens. Other works that were done included renovation of the music block to include a brand new theatre, renovations performed on other student blocks and surroundings.

== Uniform ==
Brunswick Secondary has a full school uniform, with a summer and winter uniform for girls and a uniform for boys. It also has a sports uniform, for use during practical physical education classes and during sporting competitions and events. The school does not enforce which season the uniform is worn in meaning summer clothing can be worn in winter if a student so pleases. It is also important to note that the school is accepting of males wearing the female uniform and females wearing the male uniform if they feel comfortable wearing it.

School uniform is a must need if you are attending the school. You also must wear full black shoes unless it is your P.E. or Sport Session for the day.

== History ==
=== Formation ===
Brunswick Secondary College was formed during the early 1990s after an amalgamation of Brunswick Technical School, Brunswick Girls School, Brunswick East Secondary School and Brunswick High School. It officially opened in 1995, operating on the former site of Brunswick Technical School. In the 2000s, the school saw a steady improvement in its results in many areas including VCE scores, and as such now attracts students from well beyond its neighbourhood zone. Enrolment as of 2011 is 900. The Northern Metropolitan Region has given approval for the school to grow to 1,100 over the next few years.

=== Principals ===
Ordinal	Officeholder	Start date	End date	Term in office	Notes
1	Claude Sgroi	1995	2008	12–13 years	
2	Vivienne Tellefson	2009	2016	6–7 years	
3	Karen Harris	2016		10 years	

=== Rock Eisteddfod Challenge ===
In 2011, Brunswick Secondary placed first in the Rock Eisteddfod (Premier Division). In the absence of a Rock Eisteddfod Challenge in 2010, the Victorian Government sponsored a state-wide replacement, Vic Moves, in which Brunswick placed first. In 2009, Brunswick Secondary College placed fifth in the Raw Division of the Rock Eisteddfod. In 2008, the school came third in the Premier Grand Final with their performance 'Glitch'. They also received The Edge Award of Excellence for Choreography. They also received a wildcard into the 2008 National TV Special, and received a total score of 25.5 out of 30.

Brunswick Secondary College won the Rock Eisteddfod Challenge 2007 Premier Grand Final with their performance of 'Solstice'. In addition to coming first, they were awarded the following prizes:

- The Edge Award of Excellence for Choreography
- Rock Eisteddfod Challenge Award of Excellence for Stage Use
- Nine Network Award of Excellence for Drama
- Calvin Klein Fragrances Award of Excellence for Set Design and Function
- Calvin Klein Fragrances Award of Excellence for Visual Enhancement

In 2006, students from BSC won the Open Division, with their performance of 'Overload' and the 2004 Small School Division, with their performance 'Unanana and the Elephant'. They also made finals in 2005 with their performance Billy the Punk.

The Rock Eisteddfod Challenge was last active in 2012.

== Antisemitism ==
The school had a problem with antisemitic behaviour in Term 1, 2023. A Jewish student was horrendously bullied for five weeks by other students, who confronted him with the "Heil Hitler salute, drew swastikas on desks, slide-tackled him on the hockey field and, on once occasion, held him down, and hit and kicked him, while another student attempted to draw a swastika on his leg. The student was pulled from the school by his parents after what they saw as an inadequate response by the school. After finding out what was happening to his son, the boy's father contacted the school and, after 24 hours with no response, went to the police, which resulted in the school contacting him. The school set up a safety plan for the student, but the father, who could have pressed charges, decided not to, so as to not further traumatise his son.

The large majority of the student body and staff did not know about the bullying of the student until 16 July 2023, when a news article in The Age described the abuse the student had faced as a result of his Jewish heritage, along with two other students at two other high schools.

On 1 May 2024, a message was sent to students and teachers by assistant principal Claudia Johnson about antisemitic graffiti in school toilet blocks, in the form of swastikas and antisemitic phrases. Students were reminded that Nazi imagery was not tolerated at Brunswick Secondary College and that "such displays cause harm to members of our community, and [it] is unacceptable".
