= Lara Secondary College =

Location
- Lara, Victoria; Australia; 38.0180°S 144.4114°E

Information
- Type: Public, co-educational
- Established: 2003
- Principal: Luke Skewes
- Colours: Navy blue White
- Website: LSC website

Lara Secondary College is a public co-educational secondary school located in Lara, Victoria, Australia, which shares a boundary with Lara Primary School. The school opened, taking just Year 7 students, on the current site in 2003. As of 2008 Lara Secondary College was a complete secondary school having classes from Years 7 to 12. In 2024 there were 665 students.

At the beginning of the 2012 school year, renovations had been completed and a more modern building had been built for Years 7 and 8 students.

== House colours ==
Lara Secondary College has four house teams composed of year 7 to 12's:

- Hovell (Red)
- Flinders (Purple)
- You Yangs (Green)
- Serendip (Yellow)
