= J J Cahill Memorial High School =

Location
- Sutherland Street, Mascot, Sydney, New South Wales; Australia; 33°55′40″S 151°12′06″E

Information
- Type: Public co-educational secondary day school
- Motto: Latin: Virtutis Gratia Virtus (Do what is right, because it is right)
- Established: 1 January 1961; 65 years ago
- Educational authority: NSW Department of Education
- Principal: Ralph David
- Teaching staff: 39.3 FTE (2025)
- Years: 7–12
- Enrolment: 298 (2025)
- Colours: Navy and sky blue
- Website: jjcahill-h.schools.nsw.gov.au

J J Cahill Memorial High School (abbreviated as JJCMHS; colloquially known as JJ) is a public co-educational secondary day school, located on Sutherland Street in Mascot, an inner southern suburb of Sydney, New South Wales, Australia. The school is operated by the NSW Department of Education with students from Year 7 to Year 12. Established in 1961 as a comprehensive high school, the school was named in honour of John Joseph Cahill, the local member of parliament and the Premier of New South Wales from 1952 to his death in 1959. The school is one of four NSW state schools with "memorial" in its name, alongside Sir Henry Parkes Memorial Public School in Tenterfield, Hay War Memorial High School, and Farrer Memorial Agricultural High School in Tamworth.

== History ==
In the late 1950s, as a result of lobbying from the local council, residents and the local member for Cook's River and premier, John Joseph (J. J.) Cahill, it was decided to establish a high school in Mascot. Owing to delays in construction, the school was not finished until 1961 at a cost of £324,641, two years after Cahill's death in office in October 1959. With the school establishment coinciding with the landmark 'Wyndham Report' and the Public Education Act 1961 that reformed NSW Education system, and the school being one of the first six co-education comprehensive high schools in the state, the school's first principal, Landolf (Len) George Schmidt, took a decidedly modern approach to the new school: regimentation and corporal punishment were to be kept to a minimum, and the classes were structured on a basis of the subject, rather than the Form, requiring students to move between classes, rather than teachers. A school uniform was designed with a unique blue-based tartan, that was known as "J. J. Cahill tartan".

At the time of the school's establishment, the first few intakes of the new high school were housed at Gardeners Road Public School. When the school site was ready for use, the students carried their books and furniture to the new school site down the road, an event which was commemorated at the school's 50th anniversary in 2011. In memory of Cahill's efforts to bring public education to the local area, the school decided that it was to be named in his honour. Accordingly, "J J Cahill Memorial High School" was officially opened by his widow, Esmey Cahill, on 24 March 1961, with a guard of honour from the school's cadet unit inspected by the Premier and local member of parliament, Bob Heffron. The official opening was also attended by the Anglican Archbishop of Sydney, Hugh Gough, the Mayor of Botany, John Samuel Elphick, the federal Member of Parliament for Kingsford Smith, Dan Curtin, the Director of Secondary Education, Albert William Stephens, the Chairman of the Public Service Board, John Goodsell, and the Commander of the 2nd Cadet Brigade, Lieutenant Colonel Ian Hutchison. The school army cadet unit was later presented with its unit colour and the national flag (donated by Botany and Mascot RSL associations) from the Governor-General of Australia, Viscount De L'Isle on 12 April 1962.

In 1969, the school was profiled by Evan Williams in the Sydney Morning Herald, who looked at the approach to modern education taken by the school:

Behind the high Cyclone fence that encloses the square, flat grounds are the liver-brick cottages and red-tiled roofs of lower middle-class suburbia. Apart from the windows and the playground, there is little in the brick and steel-framed concrete buildings to distinguish them from the factories nearby. I walked around the back to the lunch area, a sheltered square in the centre of the main building—the tuckshop on one side, rows of bubblers and dustbins on the other, the concrete floor crowded with wooden benches and Globite cases. A Pan American Boeing swept low across the sky, the sound of jets drowning for a moment the shrilling and yelping in the playground.

Following a financial contribution of $3 million from the Sydney Ports Corporation as part of the Port Botany Development Project, the school built a new gymnasium, which was officially opened on 7 May 2010 by Premier Kristina Keneally in the presence of the principal Robyn Cowin and the Minister for Ports and Waterways, Paul McLeay.

== Principals ==
Years	Principal
1961–1975	Len Schmidt B.A.
1975–1979	Keith Cohen B.A. A.S.T.C.
1980–1985	John Nolan B.A.
1986–1989	Tom Symonds B.A. M.Ed. M.Ed.Admin. Dip.P.E.
1990–1998	Evan MacKenzie
1999–2005	Jim Linton
2006–2016	Robyn Cowin
2017–date	Ralph David

== Notable alumni and staff ==
- Ron Hoenig – Member of the Legislative Assembly for Heffron, barrister and Mayor of the City of Botany Bay (1981–2012)
- Stan Kondilios – Lawyer and senior partner at Hall & Wilcox law firm, former councillor of the City of Botany Bay (1995–2016) and last Deputy Mayor (2015–2016)
- Greg Mackey – rugby league footballer (1980–1996)
- Jacqueline Milledge – Coroner, lawyer and magistrate for New South Wales.
- Christine Robertson – Member of Legislative Council of New South Wales (2003–2011)
- John Sutton – rugby league player for South Sydney Rabbitohs

Staff

- Bob Outterside AO – National rugby union player and teacher.
- Anne Slattery OAM – Head Teacher History and Languages, Councillor of the City of Botany Bay (1989–2012).

== See also ==
- List of government schools in New South Wales
