= Engadine High School =

High school in Engadine, New South Wales, Australia

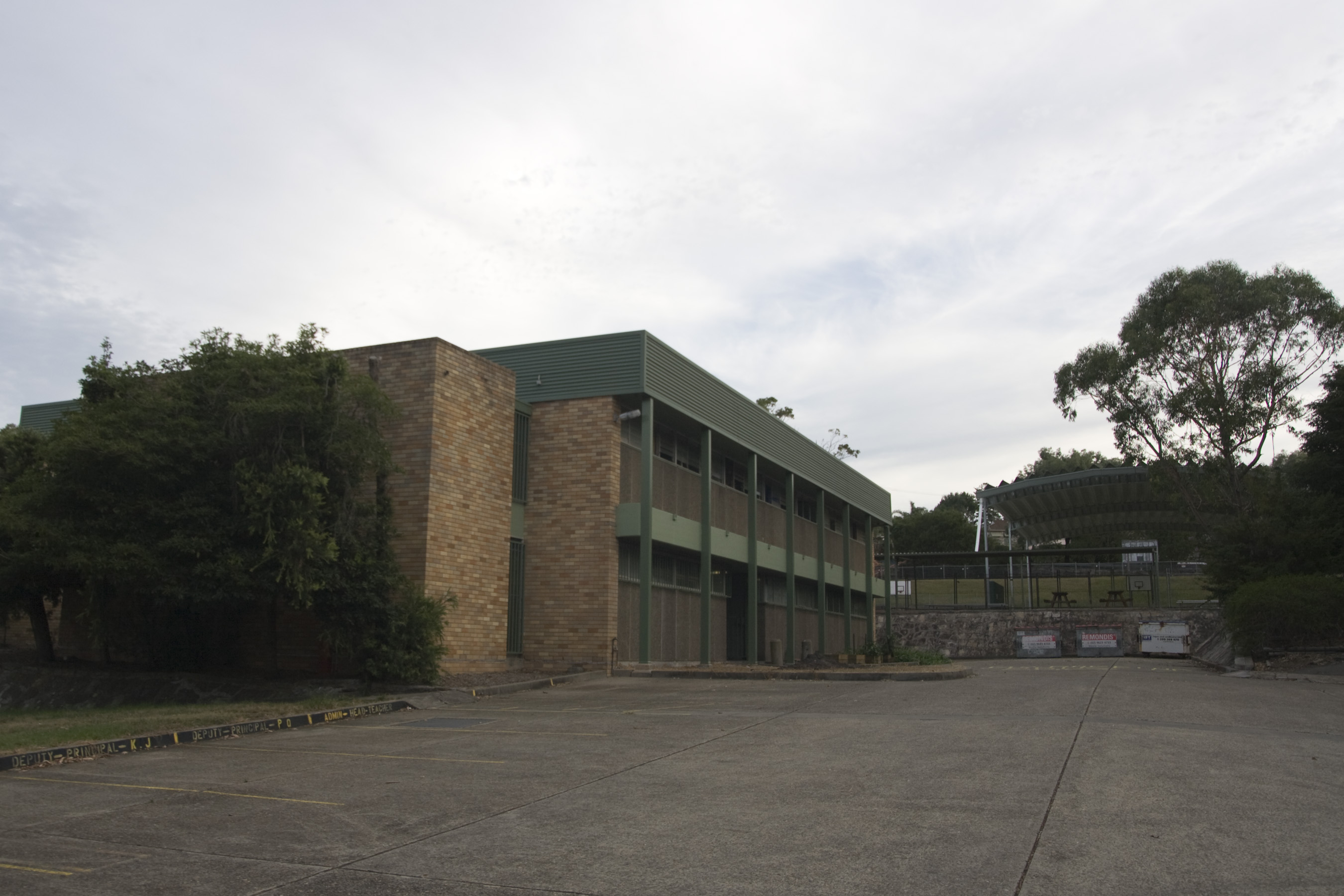
- School building

Location
- Engadine, New South Wales; Australia; 34°3′43″S 151°1′8″E

Information
- Type: Public, secondary, co-educational, day school
- Motto: Dream Believe Succeed
- Established: 1969
- Principal: Kerrie Jones
- Enrolment: ~ 1200 (7–12)
- Campus type: Suburban
- Colours: Blue, white and gold
- Mascot: Toadie
- Newspaper: The Flannel Flower (monthly newsletter)
- Website: Engadine High School

Engadine High School (abbreviated as EHS) is a school located in Engadine, Sydney, New South Wales, Australia, on Porter Road. It is a co-educational high school operated by the New South Wales Department of Education, with students from years 7 to 12. The school was established in 1969 as a result of the growing population in the Engadine area.

== History ==
Established in 1969, Engadine High School has been awarded the Director-General's Award for achievement for: Excellence in Performing Arts (2002), Consolidating a Strong Learning Culture (2004) and Outstanding Linkages Program with Primary Schools (2006). In 2009, a celebration of the school's fortieth anniversary was held in the school grounds for students and locals.

The school's original motto was "To find and not to yield," taken from the Tennyson poem "Ulysses." This was later changed to "Dream, Believe, Succeed."

== Notable alumni ==
- Chad Townsend
- Michael Lichaa
- Markus Zusak

== Controversies ==
In December 2013, it was alleged by a parent of a student with Down syndrome that her daughter and other students of the support unit were not invited to the Year 10 formal. However, the school responded by claiming that the formal was not organised by the school itself, but rather by Year 10 students and their parents, and that the students in the support unit had been invited to the formal. Other parents defended the school, saying notes given to the support unit students did not always make it home.

In early 2018, Engadine High School Principal Kerrie Jones has come under fire from parents and students for her comments on sexual violence and female skirt lengths.

== See also ==
- List of government schools in New South Wales: A–F
- Education in Australia
