= Pakenham Secondary College =

Coordinates: 38°04′18″S 145°28′14″E

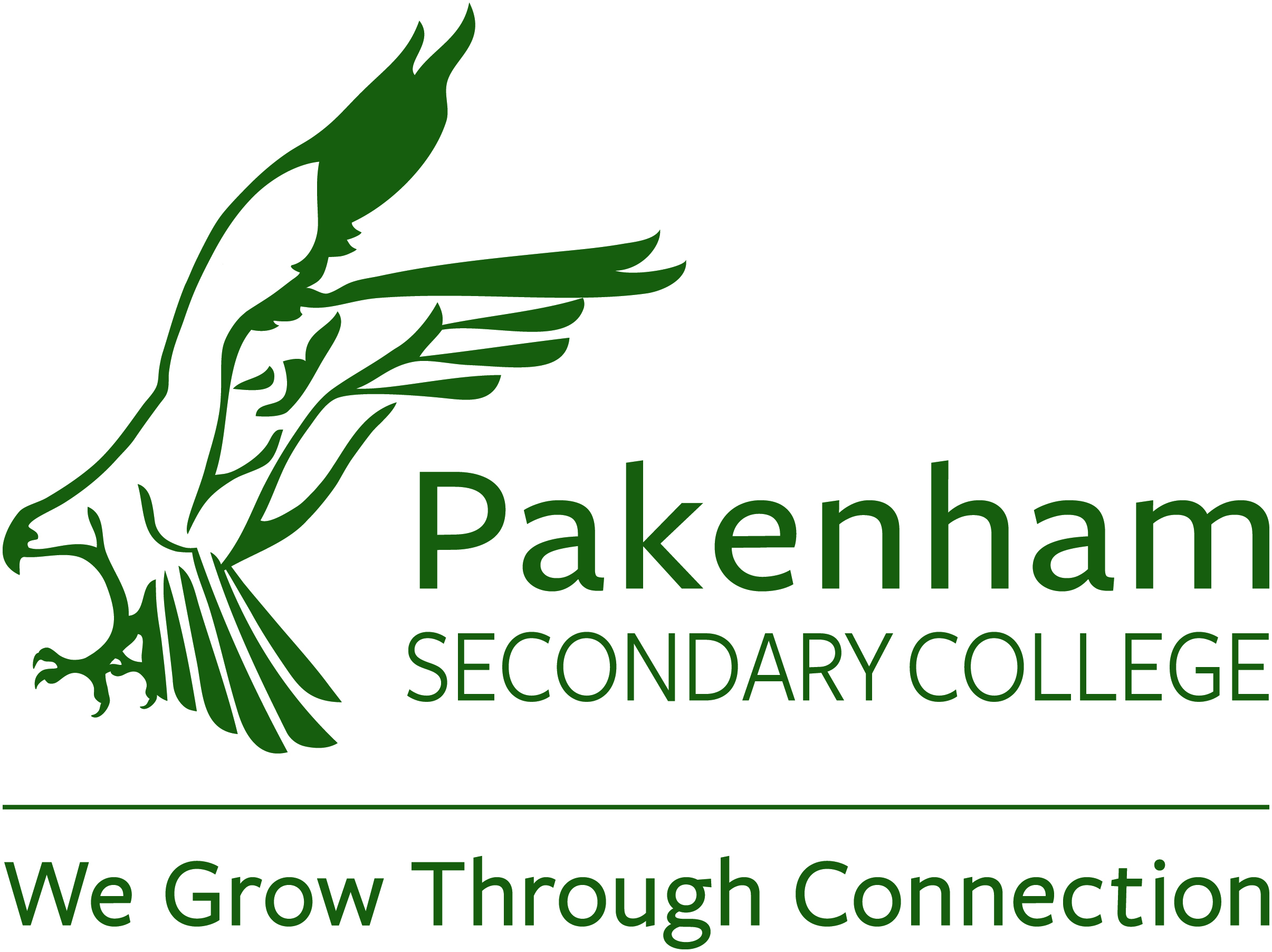
- Southern Metropolitan; Pakenham; Australia

Information
- Opened: 1968
- Principal: Aaron Smith
- Years offered: 7–12
- Enrollment: 920
- Education system: VCAL, VET and VCE
- Website: http://www.pakenhamsc.vic.edu.au/

Pakenham Secondary College is situated approximately 50 kilometres southeast of Melbourne, Australia. Established in 1968 to provide education to a largely rural community, the school now enrols over 920 students from an urban community.

== State investments ==
The Victoria State Government has made the following investments in the school:

- 2024 – Investment of $11.3 million by the Victorian State Government.
- Modernisation – Redevelopment to L/T standards/library, PE. Project cost of $2,003,000 approved in 2001/2002
- Computer POD – Project cost of $82,404 approved in 2001/2002
- Modernisation – Music Drama, Information Technology. Project cost of $423,827 approved in 2002/2003
- Flexible Learning Centre (refurbishment) for Year 7, including substantial ICT facilities. Project cost of $500,000 (part of the Leading Schools Fund announced in 2003/2004)
- Modernisation – Stage 3 – Lecture Theatre, Modern Home Economics kitchens, General purpose classrooms with open learning spaces, Student Toilets, Year 12 common room. Project cost of $4,450,000 (federal contribution of $1,600,000) approved in 2005/2006
- Modernisation – Stage 4 of 6 redevelopment – Arts, Science and Technology Studies, General purpose classrooms, Staff administration and Student Toilets. Project cost of $6,680,000 approved in 2006/2007

== Houses ==
- Boltts (blue)
- Freeman (Gold)
- Mills (Green)
- Barty (Red)

== See also ==
- List of schools in Victoria
- Victorian Certificate of Education
