= Fairhills High School =

Location
- 330 Scoresby Rd; Knoxfield, Melbourne, Victoria; Australia; 37.872°S 145.258°E

Information
- Type: State school
- Motto: Achieving Excellence
- Established: 1973
- Principal: Bill Exton (Acting)
- Grades: 7–12
- Enrolment: ~400
- Colours: Purple, green and black
- Mascot: Reece Rose
- Newspaper: Fairhills Forum
- Yearbook: Fairgo
- Website: http://www.fairhillshs.vic.edu.au

Fairhills High School is a government high school located in Knoxfield, Victoria, a suburb of Melbourne, Australia.

== Curriculum ==
Fairhills runs classes for all secondary education levels but at a number of different streams, depending on the skills of each student. The mainstream classes are the standard classes. The enhanced classes are for students who wish to and are capable of progressing faster for that subject by doing advanced learning. The bridge classes are for students who need extra learning assistance in mathematics or English. Students can also apply to join the SEAL (Select Entry Accelerated Learning) Program which places them in enhanced classes so they complete the first three-year levels of secondary education within Year 7 and 8, allowing them to do VCE level studies in Years 10, 11 and 12.

Senior students can also participate in tertiary level education at TAFE and other tertiary institutions.

== Co-curriculum activities ==
Fairhills is well known for the quality of its performing arts, with good results in dance and performance competitions like the Rock Eisteddfod:

- 2005: 1st place for Victoria, 3rd place nationally.
- 2006: 2nd place for Victoria, 6th place nationally.
- 2007: 2nd place for Victoria, 3rd place nationally.
- 2008: 1st place for Victoria, 5th place nationally.
- 2009: 1st place for Victoria, national finalist.
- 2010: 2nd place in the VicMoves competition.
- 2012: 1st place draw for Victoria, national finalist.

Each year, the school performs a musical with students participating from all year levels. Performing arts is also taught as part of the curriculum.

Fairhills also offers students access to the Knox Innovation Opportunity and Sustainability Centre (KIOSC) on the Wantirna campus of Swinburne University. This exposes them to practical exercises related to science and technology. In 2013, the Wantirna campus was designated as a second campus for Fairhills, whilst still being part of Swinburne.
