= Bordertown High School =

High school in Bordertown, South Australia

Coordinates: 36°19′S 140°46′E

Bordertown High School is a high school in Bordertown, South Australia, Australia in the Tatiara District Council. Bordertown High School was established in 1959, and in 2020 had 244 enrolled students.

On 26 September 2008, in the Adelaide Entertainment Centre, eight schools participated in the big Rock Eisteddfod Grand Final. Bordertown High School placed second in this contest with "Chickpeas Please".

== Facilities ==
The High School has several useful facilitates, including Physics, Chemistry and Biology labs, a new Language Lab, an Agriculture area with lab, including sheep, cows, pigs, goats and chickens, as well as a vegetable plot. A Tech Studies facility for both Woodwork and Metalwork and a P.E. shed are also included. The Home Economics Centre was upgraded in the Christmas Holidays between 2013 and 2014.

== Sports ==
Bordertown High School has placed highly in SESSA and SSSSA events and holds a Swimming Carnival and Sports Day in Term 1.

== New experiences ==
In December 2013, Bordertown High School sent a team of 18 students and 2 teachers to the third-world countries of Laos and Cambodia in conjunction with World Challenge. This three-and-a-half-week expedition was successful and will be offered again to year 10 and 11 students.
