= Smith's Hill High School =

Smith's Hill High School in Wollongong
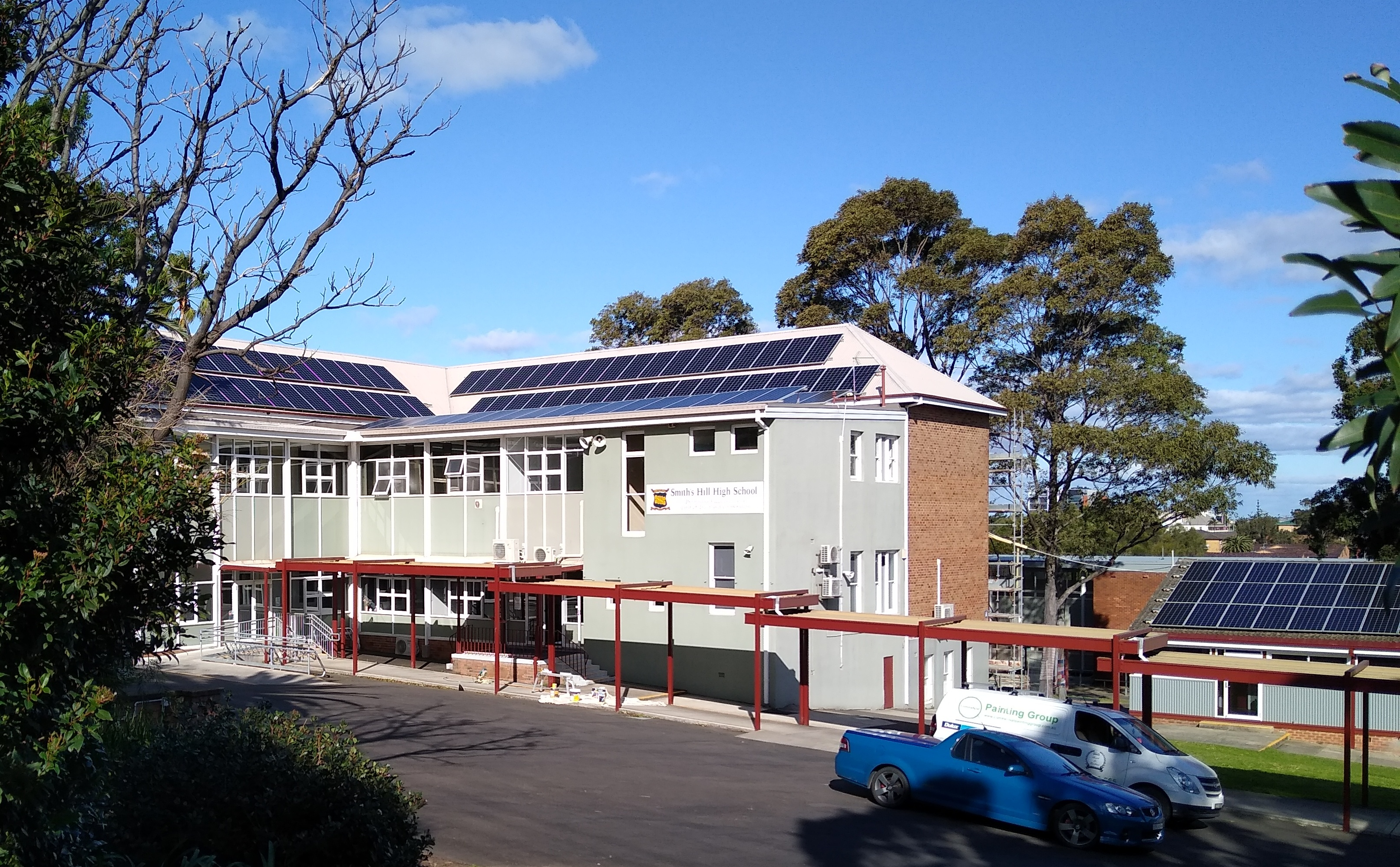

Location
- 35–37 Gipps Street, Wollongong, New South Wales; Australia; 34°25′07″S 150°53′45″E

Information
- Other name: Smiths Hill High School
- Type: Government-funded co-educational academically selective secondary day school
- Motto: Truth, service, honour
- Established: 1916; 110 years ago
- Educational authority: New South Wales Department of Education
- Principal: David Deitz
- Teaching staff: 58 (54.7 FTE) (2024)
- Years: 7–12
- Enrolment: 737 (2024)
- Campus type: Urban
- Colours: Navy blue, and gold
- Slogan: Promoting Excellence in a spirit of Trust and Cooperation
- Website: smithshill-h.schools.nsw.gov.au

Smith's Hill High School is a government-funded co-educational academically selective secondary day school, located in Wollongong, in the Illawarra region of New South Wales, Australia.

Established in 1916, the school enrolled approximately 730 students in 2018, from Year 7 to Year 12, of whom 32 percent were from a language background other than English. The school is operated by the NSW Department of Education; the current Principal for the school is David Deitz.

== Overview ==
Established in 1916, the school is situated in central Wollongong and caters for students from Year 7 to Year 12. Its close proximity to the beach, Wollongong CBD, the University of Wollongong, the Illawarra Institute of Technology, Wollongong Entertainment Centre, Illawarra Performing Arts Centre and Beaton Park sporting complex allows it to provide a balanced curriculum in terms of academic pursuits, cultural and sporting experiences. The curriculum is supplemented by relevant excursions and extra-curricular activities which include camps and national competitions of an academic nature. Students are expected to participate in sport and are encouraged to pursue their strengths in all fields of endeavour. Students who choose to attend the school do so from an area which stretches from the southern suburbs of Sydney to Batemans Bay in the south. All students are encouraged to become independent learners; make choices concerning their own learning paths; and to extend themselves through involvement in extra-curricular activities.

The application and testing process for students seeking enrolment into Year 7 at Selective Schools in NSW is centrally administered by the High Performing Students Unit of the New South Wales Department of Education. Applications for Year 7 are made in Year 5 with testing undertaken in Year 6. Applications open in mid-October and close in mid-November. Application Forms are available from local primary schools or can be downloaded from the High Performing Students Unit website when applications open. Students seeking a place at the school after Semester 1 in Year 7 make an application directly to the school. Application packages are available from late June and need to be submitted by late July. Further information and application forms are also available from the High Performing Students Unit website.

== History ==
In 1906, Wollongong Primary School began to offered vocational education courses for non-academic students. This included courses such as Household Accounts, Cookery, Laundry and Dressmaking. Five years later, in 1911, secondary courses were offered to academic students which allowed students to achieve the Intermediate Certificate and with further study, the Leaving Certificate.

A separate school for these courses was then established in 1916 under the name Wollongong Home Science School. This school was a single-sex education school for girls only and was based on a site in Smith Street, Wollongong. In 1957, the school relocated to its current location on the former site of Wollongong High School in Gipps Street and then in 1958, was renamed as Smith's Hill Girls High School. The school then allowed non-academic students to achieve the Intermediate and Leaving Certificates.

During the 1970s, plans were underway to change the school into a comprehensive, co-educational High School and in 1979 the school was renamed Smith's Hill High School. In 1985, boys were enrolled in Years 7, 8, 9 and 11 drawing from feeder schools at Wollongong, Coniston and Mount St Thomas. By 1986, SHHS was completely co-educational from Years 7 through 12.

Then in 1988, the NSW Department of Education decided to make the school a selective high school and from 1989 the annual Year 7 intake of students was to be filled through exam selections. The school has remained completely selective ever since.

Smith's Hill High School was affected by a set of unsolved arson attacks targeting schools in the Illawarra during 1999. Other schools affected included Dapto High School, Warrawong High School, and Kanahooka High School. No suspect was ever caught.

In January 2023, David Deitz, the principal of the school, was paralysed in a bicycle accident while competing at the Illawarra Track Carnival's 60th anniversary. Nicole Kaiserfeld took on the role as relieving principal during his recovery. Deitz returned as school principal in 2025.

== Higher School Certificate ==
Students Smith's Hill High School have consistently performed well in the NSW Higher School Certificate examinations, with the school placing 38th in the state in 2010 and having fifteen students make the All-round Achievers List. As a result of strong HSC performances, a high percentage of students from Smith's Hill High gain university entrance each year. This tradition of success has been in the school for many years.

Smith's Hill offers a diverse range of subjects for both seniors and juniors in a number of key learning areas. For senior subjects which are unable to be offered due to lack of numbers, students are assisted to complete these subjects through distance education, in association with an appropriate distance education school.

== Extracurricular activities ==
=== Rock Eisteddfod Challenge ===
For many years, Smith's Hill High School participated in the Rock Eisteddfod Challenge. The school was in the Grand Final every year from 2004 and was a regular Grand Final contender in years previous. Due to the preparation time required, and the high level of physical activity involved, the Rock Eisteddfod Challenge performance was worked on during weekly sport activities. Smith's Hill High School participated in two divisions of Rock Eisteddfod Challenge, the RAW Division for Years 8 through 10, and the Premier Division for Years 11 and 12. Unlike other schools, students were not required to audition and positions are filled with preference given to students based on their grade. Also, Smith's Hill was one of the few schools that offered Year 7 students an opportunity to compete, with the most recent Year 7 RAW production being 'Nelson Mandela: Son of Africa' in 2011, which came fifth in the state finals in Sydney. There were a number of teachers involved at Smith's Hill who were also part of the Rock Eisteddfod Challenge.

In 2006, the Premier Division team performed "Tibet: Roof of the World". The storyline included "Tibetan monks paying their last respects to the previous Dalai Lama, as well as the 1949 Chinese invasion and the exile of His Holiness the 14th Dalai Lama." After this performance, the team were granted a private audience with the Dalai Lama who asked the students to "continue to spread his message of peace, spirituality and protection of the environment to others throughout the state."

=== Tournament of Minds ===
Smith's Hill regularly submits teams to participate in the Tournament of Minds competition. The school has had several successes in the competition with the 1998 team being state finalists, the 2002 and 2003 teams being national finalists and the 2005, 2018, 2019 x2 teams winning the national final. In 2008, for the first time two teams were entered in the competition which resulted in the Social Sciences team placing second in New South Wales and the Language Literature team gaining second place at the Australasian Finals in Melbourne. In 2010, the Applied Technology team succeeded in becoming national finalists and in 2012 the Maths and Engineering team scored tournament honours in the Australasian Finals in Perth.. In 2013, the Language Literature team again placed second at the Australasian Finals in Canberra. In 2015, a Language literature team also made it to the Australasian Pacific Finals in Sydney and gained tournament honours. In 2017, a Language literature team once again made it to the Australasian Pacific Finals in Adelaide and placed 2nd with tournament honours. In 2018, the Tournament of Minds Language / Literature team won internationals, the biggest win the school had experienced. In 2019 this was surpassed with two teams – Social Sciences and STEM – winning internationals at Hobart after winning the state tournament in 2019.

=== School productions ===
Smith's Hill High School has a history in performing school productions such as musicals and plays. In 2001, Smith's Hill High School produced its first musical in recent history, performing Little Shop of Horrors. Since then, school productions have been staged regularly

Drama Teacher Bro Reveleigh hosted multiple "Comedy Revues" featuring slapstick comedy and skits written, cast, directed and performed by students. In recent memory, there have been 3 shows: One in 2016, one in 2017, and the final one in 2022.

=== Mooting ===
Since 2008 Smith's Hill High School has entered into the High School Mooting Competition of Bond University to promote and encourage Legal Studies students within the school. The school has achieved much success in the competition achieving second at the National Finals in 2009 and reaching the National Finals in 2011.

=== Debating ===
Smiths Hill High School has reached the NSW semi-finals for the Premier's Debating Challenge since 2007, winning the competition on six occasions, most recently in 2021.

The representative NSW Combined High Schools debating team has also included Smith's Hill students over the last several years. In recent years they won the Hume Barbour Trophy in both 2019 and 2021.

=== Public Competitions ===
- Biology Olympiad Team (International team representative in 2023)

=== Ensembles ===
Smith's Hill also has a variety of music groups and ensembles, all of which are organised and run by music teachers Lisa Wellings and Kathleen Russo. Each practice regularly and perform at special events, such as formal assemblies and open days including the School Expo, Presentation Nights and the 50th Birthday Open Day. At the end of the year, participating students get the opportunity to spend two days busking in Sydney. The music ensembles include:

==== String Ensemble ====
This ensemble is for students who play violin, viola, double bass and cello, accompanied by a piano player. The ensemble usually plays arrangements of the classical genre, and is instructed by a professional tutor.

Recently, the group has performed a range of folk, contemporary, and popular songs, including compositions by Coldplay and Lady Gaga. Membership is open to students at the school who play an instrument at an advanced level.

The String Ensemble has played at eisteddfods, weddings and a number of other functions across the Illawarra.

==== Concert Band ====
This band is for students who can play brass or woodwind instruments, as well as percussion and instruments in the rhythm section.

==== Vocal Ensemble ====
The Vocal Ensemble is for any student who has an interest in singing. Smith's Hill's most accredited musical piece was their rendition of Beyonce's "Halo", performed in 2017. Practice takes place after school hours and is open to all students, though students may also be personally invited to join.

==== Chorale Group ====
The Chorale Group is an a cappella group and entrance is by invitation only.

==== Junior Jazz Ensemble ====
This ensemble is for students in Years 7–10 who have an interest in Jazz and can play an instrument suitable to the Jazz genre.

==== Jazz Band ====
Formerly known as the Stage Band, the Senior Jazz Band is a small performance group made up of experienced student musicians, and is designed to play at school events where it would be less practical for the Concert Band to perform.

== Climate ==
Smiths hill has a Cfb bordering Cfa koppen climate type. It has warm to hot summers and cool winters.

Climate data for Wollongong University (1970–2008)
Month	Jan	Feb	Mar	Apr	May	Jun	Jul	Aug	Sep	Oct	Nov	Dec	Year
Record high °C (°F)	44.1 (111.4)	41.7 (107.1)	40.2 (104.4)	35.4 (95.7)	28.5 (83.3)	24.7 (76.5)	25.7 (78.3)	30.3 (86.5)	34.2 (93.6)	38.8 (101.8)	40.6 (105.1)	41.5 (106.7)	44.1 (111.4)
Mean daily maximum °C (°F)	25.8 (78.4)	25.8 (78.4)	24.5 (76.1)	22.6 (72.7)	20.1 (68.2)	17.9 (64.2)	17.2 (63.0)	18.6 (65.5)	20.7 (69.3)	22.5 (72.5)	23.1 (73.6)	24.9 (76.8)	22.0 (71.6)
Mean daily minimum °C (°F)	17.9 (64.2)	18.1 (64.6)	16.6 (61.9)	13.8 (56.8)	11.6 (52.9)	9.6 (49.3)	8.4 (47.1)	8.6 (47.5)	10.5 (50.9)	12.5 (54.5)	14.2 (57.6)	16.3 (61.3)	13.2 (55.8)
Record low °C (°F)	9.6 (49.3)	10.3 (50.5)	9.1 (48.4)	5.1 (41.2)	3.1 (37.6)	2.0 (35.6)	0.8 (33.4)	2.0 (35.6)	3.3 (37.9)	4.7 (40.5)	5.4 (41.7)	8.3 (46.9)	0.8 (33.4)
Average rainfall mm (inches)	130.3 (5.13)	156.4 (6.16)	160.4 (6.31)	129.3 (5.09)	106.4 (4.19)	112.4 (4.43)	63.4 (2.50)	83.3 (3.28)	67.4 (2.65)	100.5 (3.96)	115.6 (4.55)	94.6 (3.72)	1,320.9 (52.00)
Average rainy days	13.8	13.7	14.5	11.2	10.8	9.7	8.5	7.8	9.3	11.4	13.6	13.0	137.3
Average afternoon relative humidity (%)	68	69	66	63	62	59	54	52	55	61	64	64	61
Source: https://www.bom.gov.au/climate/averages/tables/cw_068188_All.shtml

== See also ==
- List of government schools in New South Wales: Q–Z
- List of selective high schools in New South Wales
- Education in Australia
