= Como Secondary College =

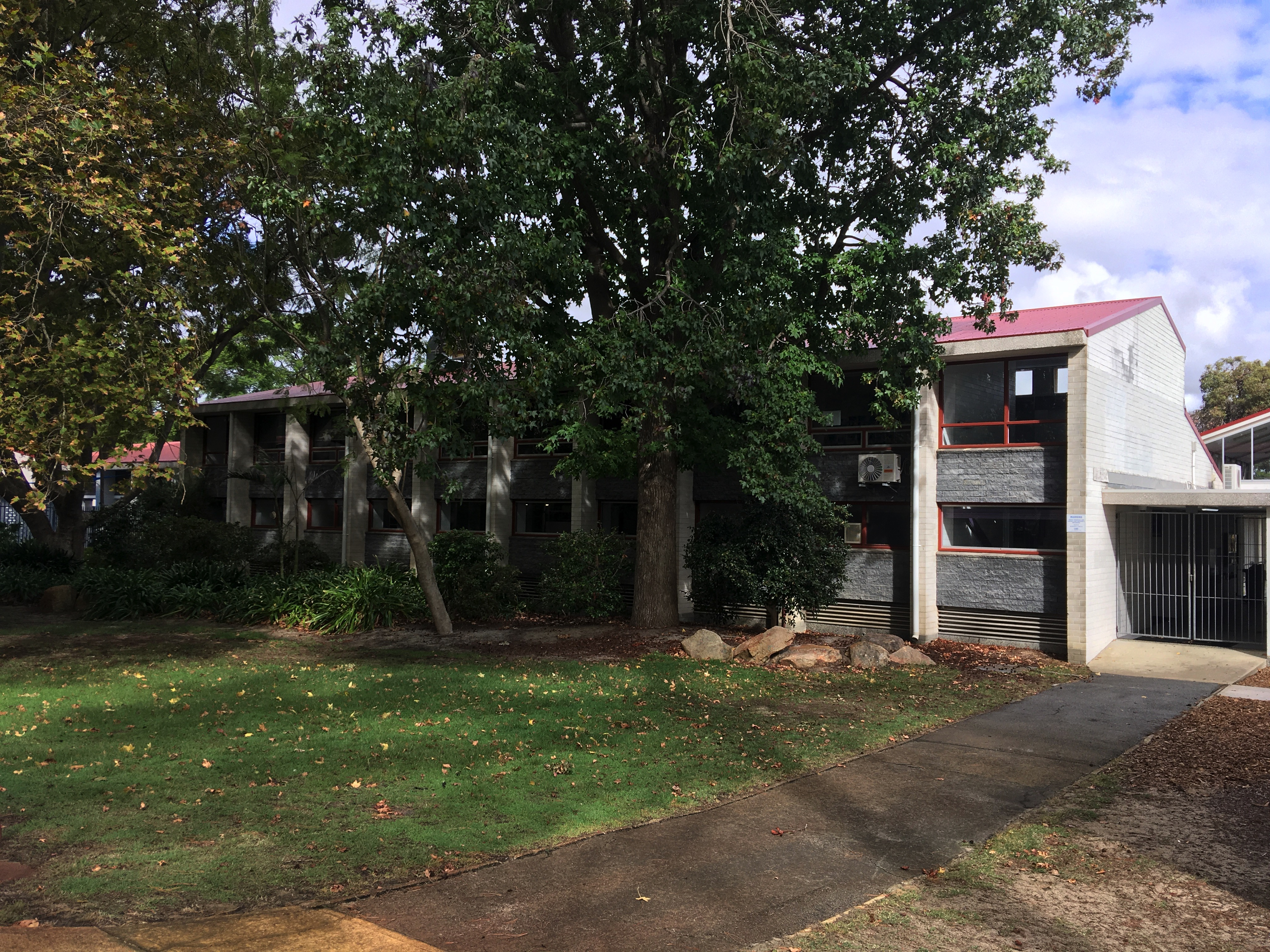

Location
- Como, Perth, Western Australia; Australia; 32°00′11″S 115°52′12″E

Information
- Type: Independent public co-educational specialist high day school
- Motto: Achieving and celebrating our personal best
- Established: 1969; 57 years ago
- Educational authority: Department of Education of the Government of Western Australia
- Principal: Alen Kursar
- Staff: 87
- Years: 7–12
- Enrolment: 818 (31 December 2023)
- Campus type: Suburban
- Colours: Navy blue and white
- Website: www.como.wa.edu.au

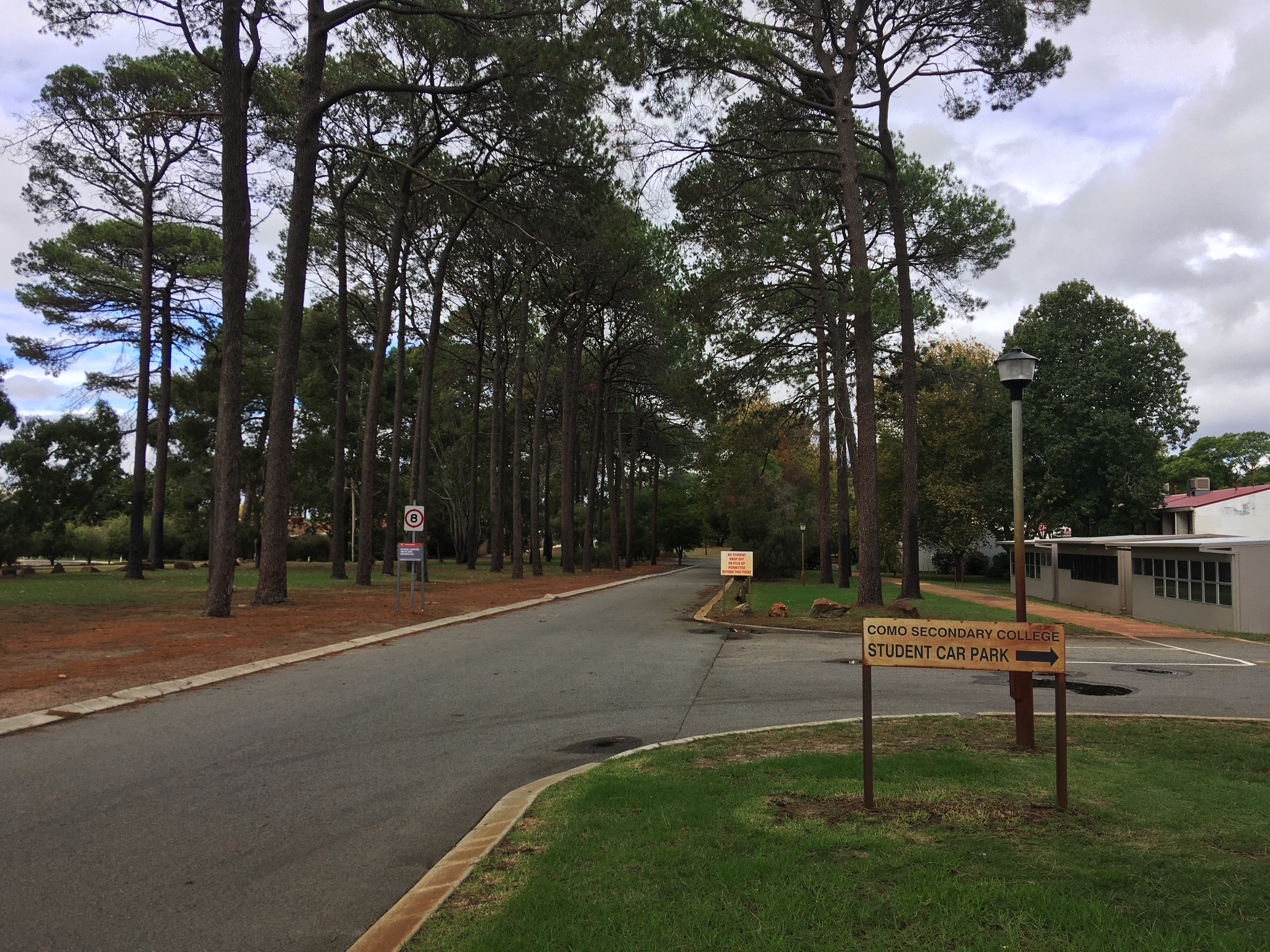
Entrance road

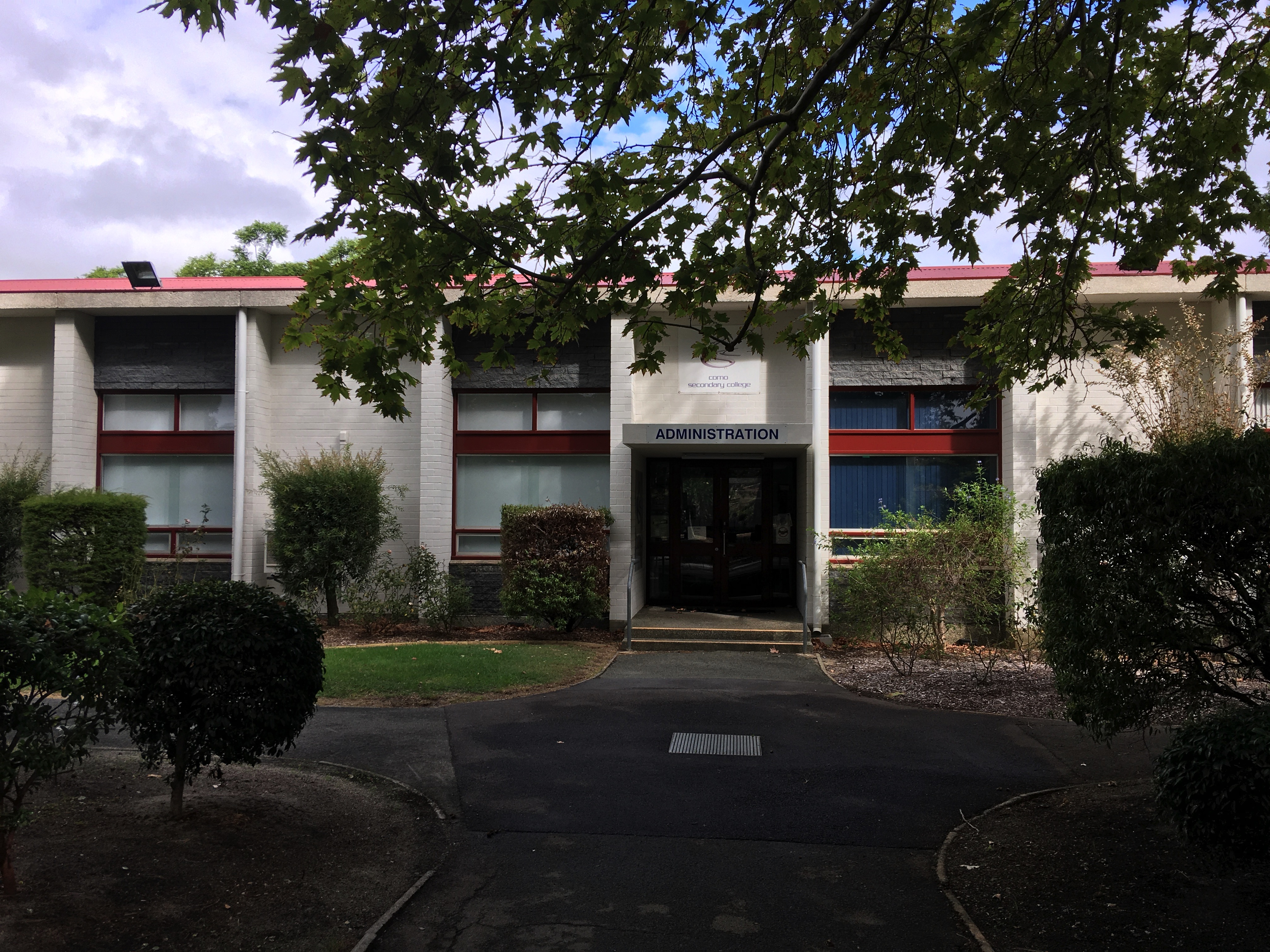
Administration building

Como Secondary College is an independent public, specialist, co-educational and day, high school, located in Como, a suburb of Perth, Western Australia. Established in 1969, the school caters for students from Year 7 to Year 12. It has an enrolment of 818 students as of 31 December 2023, and employs 87 staff as of 29 April 2024.

== History ==
The school is located on land that was part of the former Collier Pine Plantation, an area of approximately 364 hectares (900 acres) planted in 1925 by the Western Australian Forests Department.

Constructed in 1968, the first classes commenced in February 1969. The school is open to students of ages 12 to 18 (Year 7 to Year 12). It often takes Rotary exchange students from overseas.

== Local intake area ==
As defined by the School Education Act 1999, the local intake area for Como Secondary College covers the entire suburbs of South Perth, Como, Manning, Salter Point, Karawara, Waterford and Wilson, with the feeder primary schools of Como, Collier, Manning, Wilson and Curtin.

15% of the student enrolments are from beyond the local intake area, attending the school's specialist studies programs. The diversity of the student population is broadened by the contributions of an international students' program at the school and by students who come from all over the metropolitan area and regional Western Australia to be part of one of the specialist programs. Many regional students choose to board in the nearby Rotary House in Victoria Park.

== Programs ==
The school offers international tours in hockey, golf, music, and the opportunity of travel to different international destinations with the World Challenge community service and humanitarian expedition every two years.

=== Golf ===
The Golf Academy is one of the most successful school programmes in Australia, earning local, state and national titles and achievements. Over 16 professional golfers including Matt Jager, Kristie Smith and Hannah Green have graduated from the program, and the academy holds five Australasian titles, five national teams' titles, and thirteen state teams’ titles. The academy has also had a significant number of state and national representatives as well as state and world champions amongst its ranks.

=== Hockey ===
The hockey program is Australia's best school hockey program, with both boys' and girls' teams dominating competitions in Western Australia every year. The academy has won numerous state school championship titles.

- 2000–2009, 2011–12, 2013–2017 David Bell Cup (Open Boys) Champions
- 1995, 1997, 2000–02, 2004–05, 2007–11, 2016–17 Buchanan Cup (Open Girls) Champions
- 2006–08, 2010–14, 2017 Ross Meadows Shield (Year 7–9 Mixed) Champions

On 18 August 2017, the academy set a Guinness World Record for the largest hockey lesson; it included 618 participants.

== Notable alumni ==
- Kenny Bain – hockey; Commonwealth Games (Scotland)
- Ian Burcher – hockey; Kookaburras
- Craig Davies – hockey; olympian, world champion, WAIS Athlete of the Year 1988/89
- Hannah Green – golf professional and 2019 Women's PGA Championship winner; olympian; Western Australian Sports Star of the Year 2020
- Matt Jager – golf professional
- Rick Kulacz – golf professional
- Shelly Liddelow – hockey; olympian
- David Mari – bobsled; olympian
- Kathryn Slattery – hockey; olympian
- Kristie Smith – golf professional
- Celine Wilde – hockey; German olympian

== See also ==
- List of schools in the Perth metropolitan area
