= Pascoe Vale Girls College =

Pascoe Vale Girls' College

Location
- Pascoe Vale, Victoria; Australia; 37°43′5″S 144°56′5″E

Information
- Type: Public, single-sex, high school
- Motto: Virtue Kindles Strength
- Established: 1956; 70 years ago
- Principal: Kay Peddle
- Enrolment: ~700 (7–12)
- Campus: Suburban
- Colours: Silver, blue & green
- Website: www.pvgc.vic.edu.au

Pascoe Vale Girls' College is a public, girls' high school located in Pascoe Vale, a suburb of Melbourne, Victoria, Australia. It offers schooling for approximately 700 students from years 7 to 12.

== House system ==
The school is divided into four different houses:

- Cowan (green), named after Edith Cowan
- Wake (red), named after Nancy Wake
- Melba (blue), named after Nelly Melba
- Alberti (yellow), named after Susan Alberti

== History ==
Pascoe Vale Girls School opened in 1956 with an enrolment of 115 girls. Until the completion of the first section of building, classes were conducted in the Holy Trinity Parish Hall in Pleasant Street, and the Central Progress Association Hall in Park Street. K.D Meldrum was appointed as the first Head Mistress. Classes were conducted in the buildings on the permanent site in Lake Avenue in February 1957. By this time the school enrolment had risen to 500 students. The second and third sections of the main school were completed and occupied by 1962. A foundation ceremony was held, at which the Director of Education, A. McDonell, unveiled a plaque to commemorate the completion of the main building. In 1963 E.D Daniel was appointed Head Mistress. Pascoe Vale Girls lost its "Girls Domestic School" stigma and became a High School in 1966. In 1968, the E.D Daniel Assembly Hall was officially opened, and enrolments continued to increase, despite the fact that there was no sixth form.

In 1975 E. De Motte was appointed Principal.

A Commonwealth Science block was added to the site and the George O'Brien Oval was named after the School Council President who had served the school for 18 years. The student population grew to 825 and the E.D Motte Library was built. The current principal, Helen Jackson took over in 1987. In 1991, Pascoe Vale Girls became a Secondary College. 1995 heralded a new era when, under the Schools of the Future program, Pascoe Vale Girls Secondary College officially became a self-managing one and in 2002 was renamed Pascoe Vale Girls College. With a population of over 600 girls.

In 2009, the school received AUD $6.3 million for renovations and new buildings, which was completed in 2011. The school's previous principal, Helen Jackson, is the longest serving principal in Victoria, with over 60 years of teaching experience. Jackson suffered a stroke at age 84 and has since stepped down as principal. The current principal, Kay Peddle, was appointed in 2015.

== Notable alumni ==
Notable ex-students include singer/performer Colleen Hewett.

== See also ==
- List of schools in Victoria
- Victorian Certificate of Education
- Head of the River (Victoria)
