= Peter Williamson (footballer) =

Australian rules footballer

Personal information
- Born: 1 December 1953 (age 72)
- Original team: Parkdale
- Height: 188 cm (6 ft 2 in)
- Weight: 80.5 kg (177 lb)

Playing career^{1}
Years	Club	Games (Goals)
1971–74	Melbourne	27 (16)
- ^{1} Playing statistics correct to the end of 1974.

Peter Williamson (born 1 December 1953) is a former Australian rules footballer who played with Melbourne in the Victorian Football League (VFL).
