= Mordialloc Secondary College =

Location
- Station St; Aspendale/Mordialloc; Melbourne, Victoria, 3195; Australia; 38.0122°S 145.0923°E

Information
- Type: State co-educational secondary
- Motto: Latin: Veho Spes Juventutis (I Carry the Hopes of Youth)
- Established: 1924
- Principal: Rachel Stone
- Years offered: 7–12
- Enrolment: c.950
- Campus: Aspendale
- Colours: green, gold and blue
- Website: www.mcsc.vic.edu.au

Mordialloc Secondary College or Mordialloc College is a state co-educational secondary school located in the suburbs of Melbourne at Aspendale, City of Kingston, on the south bank of the Mordialloc Creek.

== Description ==
The college currently has 1214 students (as of 2025) in year 7 to year 12 and offers a broad range of academic and creative subjects. It also offers extracurricular activities including a rock eisteddfod, musical productions and bands, camps, overseas tours, competitions and Duke of Edinburgh Awards. It has an International Student Program with an accredited English Language Centre, supported by an established network of homestay families, and a Select Entry Accelerated Learning (Gifted Children) Program. The S.E.A.L program exists for years 7–10.

== History ==
It was founded in February 1924 as the Mordialloc District High School, with 148 students who were temporarily accommodated in the Mechanics Institute Hall in Albert Street, Mordialloc. Later that year the school's name changed to Mordialloc Carrum District High school when it was officially opened by Cr Roy Beardsworth of the Borough of Carrum; it was subsequently known as the Mordialloc Chelsea High School.

On 15 February 1928 the main redbrick building at the present site was completed with eight classrooms; subjects taught at that time included commercial studies, domestic science, woodwork, sheetmetal working and blacksmithing.

In 1997, the college advertised its "new and refurbished facilities".

The college started accredited training in first aid and cardio-pulmonary resuscitation in 1999, with twenty students enrolled. Students completing the two-year program qualify for a bronze-level Duke of Edinburgh's Award.

State Government budget cuts in 2011 resulted in the loss of $50,000 in funding for Victorian Certificate of Applied Learning (VCAL) programs at the college, but it had already made a commitment to double the size of the programs.

As of 2022, Mordialloc Secondary College has participated in "Innovative Learning Environments (ILE)" in which instructors employ "explicit meta-cognitive strategies and a desire to move away from 'teaching to the text', established practices which then informed the spatial redesign to utilise the space differently to achieve these aims".

== Alumni ==
The College Alumni Association was incorporated in October 2014. One of its aims is to create a digital, searchable database of material and resources pertaining to the school, before the school's centenary in 2024.
