= Elisabeth Murdoch College =

State high school in Langwarrin

Coordinates: 38°9′33″S 145°11′27″E

- Langwarrin; Australia

Information
- Other name: EMC
- Former name: Langwarrin Secondary College (1987–2004); Langwarrin Post Primary School (1984–1986)
- Type: State co-ed Secondary (Year 7–12)
- Motto: Pathways to Success
- Established: 1984
- Founder: Mr Frank Gray
- Authority: Department of Education (Victoria)
- Principal: Jodie Ashby (acting)
- Substantive Principal: Dean King
- Staff: 170
- Gender: Co-ed
- Age range: 12-18
- Enrollment: 1,600 (2025)
- Language: English
- Website: www.emc.vic.edu.au

Elisabeth Murdoch College (EMC) is a state coeducational secondary school, located in Melbourne Victoria's south-eastern suburb of Langwarrin. Serving years 7 to 12, The college has an education program which incorporates VCE-TP, VCE-VN and VET. The college is a registered training organisation which can grant certificate courses.
