= Toronto High School (New South Wales) =

Location
- Toronto, Lake Macquarie, Hunter Region, New South Wales; Australia; 33°00′31″S 151°34′59″E

Information
- Type: Government-funded co-educational comprehensive secondary day school
- Motto: Latin: Remis Insurgite (Rise to Your Oars)
- Established: 1962; 64 years ago
- School district: Lake Macquarie West; Regional North
- Educational authority: New South Wales Department of Education
- Principal: Mark McConville
- Teaching staff: 69.7 FTE (2018)
- Years: 7–12
- Enrolment: 956 (2018)
- Campus type: Suburban
- Website: toronto-h.schools.nsw.gov.au

Toronto High School is a government-funded co-educational comprehensive secondary day school, located in Toronto, a suburb in the City of Lake Macquarie, in the Hunter Region of New South Wales, Australia.

Established in 1962, the school enrolled 950 students in 2018, from Year 7 to Year 12, of whom 15 percent identified as Indigenous Australians and four percent were from a language background other than English. The school is operated by the NSW Department of Education; the principal is Mark McConville.

== See also ==
- List of government schools in New South Wales: Q–Z
- Education in Australia
