= Bellarine Secondary College =

School in Victoria, Australia

Location
- Peninsula Drive and Shell Road; Drysdale and the sub campus Ocean Grove, Victoria, 3222; Australia; 38°11′26.6″S 144°33′23.2″E

Information
- School type: Public, co-educational, secondary day school
- Established: 1957 as Queenscliff High School
- Principal: First-J.J.Bishop Current-Wayne Johannesen
- Grades: 7–12
- Enrollment: 1400 approx.
- Houses: Corio; Lonsdale; Nepean; Swan
- Website: bellarinesc.vic.edu.au

Bellarine Secondary College is a multi-campus school on the Bellarine Peninsula, Australia. The college consists of 2 campuses, one in Ocean Grove, and the main campus in Drysdale. The school is an all inclusive school for boys, girls and any other genders

== Campuses ==
The Ocean Grove campus is for year 7 & 8 students. It is located at 70 Shell Rd in Ocean Grove, Victoria 3226.

The Drysdale campus is for year 9-12 students. It is located at 43-71 Peninsula Dr in Drysdale, Victoria 3222. There is a library, canteen, sports stadium with 3 basketball courts and an 'open study/learning centre' named Yani-Iny-Ngitj, which translates from local Aboriginal language to "We walk to the future".

== Achievements ==
In 2012, Bellarine sent 6 students to the World Robot Olympiad in Kuala Lumpur, Malaysia. Their teams, The Wombots and Blue Tongues, finished 16th and 23rd out of the 60 countries to participate.

== Farm My School ==
The school has a farm that is run by volunteer students and agriculture-horticulture students.

== Houses ==
The school has 4 houses, each represented by a colour and name. They are generally used to divide the school during sports events and assemblies. Room numbers are also divided by house at the Drysdale campus. They are as follows:

- Corio, red
- Lonsdale, blue
- Nepean, yellow
- Swan, green
