= Barratt (name) =

Barratt is a surname and a given name. Notable people with the name include:

== Surname ==
- Alf Barratt (1920–2002), English footballer
- Alfred Barratt (1844–1881), English barrister and philosophical writer
- Arthur Barratt (1891–1966), British air marshal
- W. Augustus Barratt (1873–1947), Scottish-born, later American, songwriter and musician
- Barnaby B. Barratt (born 1950), psychoanalyst, specialist in human sexuality
- Bethany Barratt (born 1972), American political scientist and author
- Billy Barratt (born 2007), British actor
- Bob Barratt (died 2004), British record producer
- Brenda Barratt (born 1946), English watercolour painter
- Brian Barratt-Boyes (1924–2006), heart surgeon
- Bronte Barratt (born 1989), Australian swimmer
- Claire Barratt (born 1974), British industrial archaeologist, steam engineer and television presenter
- Colin Barratt (born 1948), British rower
- Craig H. Barratt (born 1962), Australian technology executive
- Enoch Barratt (1812–1895), Australian nurseryman
- Sir Francis Layland-Barratt, 1st Baronet (1860–1933), British Liberal Party politician
- Fred Barratt (1894–1947), cricketer
- George Osborne Barratt (1827–1906), confectioner
- Harry Barratt (1918–1989), English football player and manager
- Henry Barratt (born 1983), English rugby union player
- Holly Barratt (born 1988), Australian swimmer
- Issie Barratt (born 1964), British composer
- Joe Barratt (1895–1968), English footballer
- Jordyn Barratt (born 1998), American skateboarder
- Julian Barratt (born 1968), English actor and musician
- Keren Barratt (born 1946), English football referee
- Lawrie Barratt (1927–2012), founder of Barratt Developments, housebuilders
- Legh Barratt (1871–1950), English cricketer
- Les Barratt (born 1945), English footballer
- Mary Barratt Due (1888–1969), Norwegian pianist
- Matilda M. Barratt (1837–1902), member of the first general presidency of the Primary organization of the Church of Jesus Christ of Latter-day Saints
- Michael Barratt (astronaut) (born 1959), astronaut
- Michael Barratt (television presenter) (1928–2022), British television presenter
- Michael Barratt Brown (1918–2015), British economist, political activist and adult educator
- Nick Barratt (born 1970), English genealogist
- Paul Barratt (1944–2021), senior Australian public servant and policymaker
- Percy Barratt (1898–1974), English footballer
- Richard Barratt (1928–2013), Chief Inspector of Constabulary
- Roy Barratt (1942–1995), English cricketer
- Stephan Henrik Barratt-Due (1919–1985), Norwegian violinist and music teacher
- Stephan Barratt-Due (born 1956), Norwegian violinist
- Ted Barratt (1844–1891), English cricketer
- Terry Barratt (born 1971), English cricketer
- Thomas Barratt (VC) (1895–1917), Victoria Cross recipient
- Thomas Ball Barratt (1862–1940), Norwegian pastor
- Thomas J. Barratt (1841–1914), pioneer of mass advertising
- Tony Barratt (born 1965), English footballer
- Virginia Barratt (born 1959), Australian artist
- Will Barratt, American cinematographer and producer
- William Barratt (1823–1889), English convert to Mormonism
- William Cross Barratt (1862–1940), senior British Army and British Indian Army officer

== Given name ==
- Barratt O'Hara (1882–1969), U.S. Congressman from Illinois
- Barratt Waugh (born 1979), British countertenor singer

== See also ==
- Barrat, a surname
- Barrett (surname)
- Barat (disambiguation)
- Bharat (disambiguation)
