= Parks and gardens of Melbourne =

Parks and gardens in Melbourne, VIC, Australia

Coordinates: 37°48′47.41″S 144°57′46.73″E

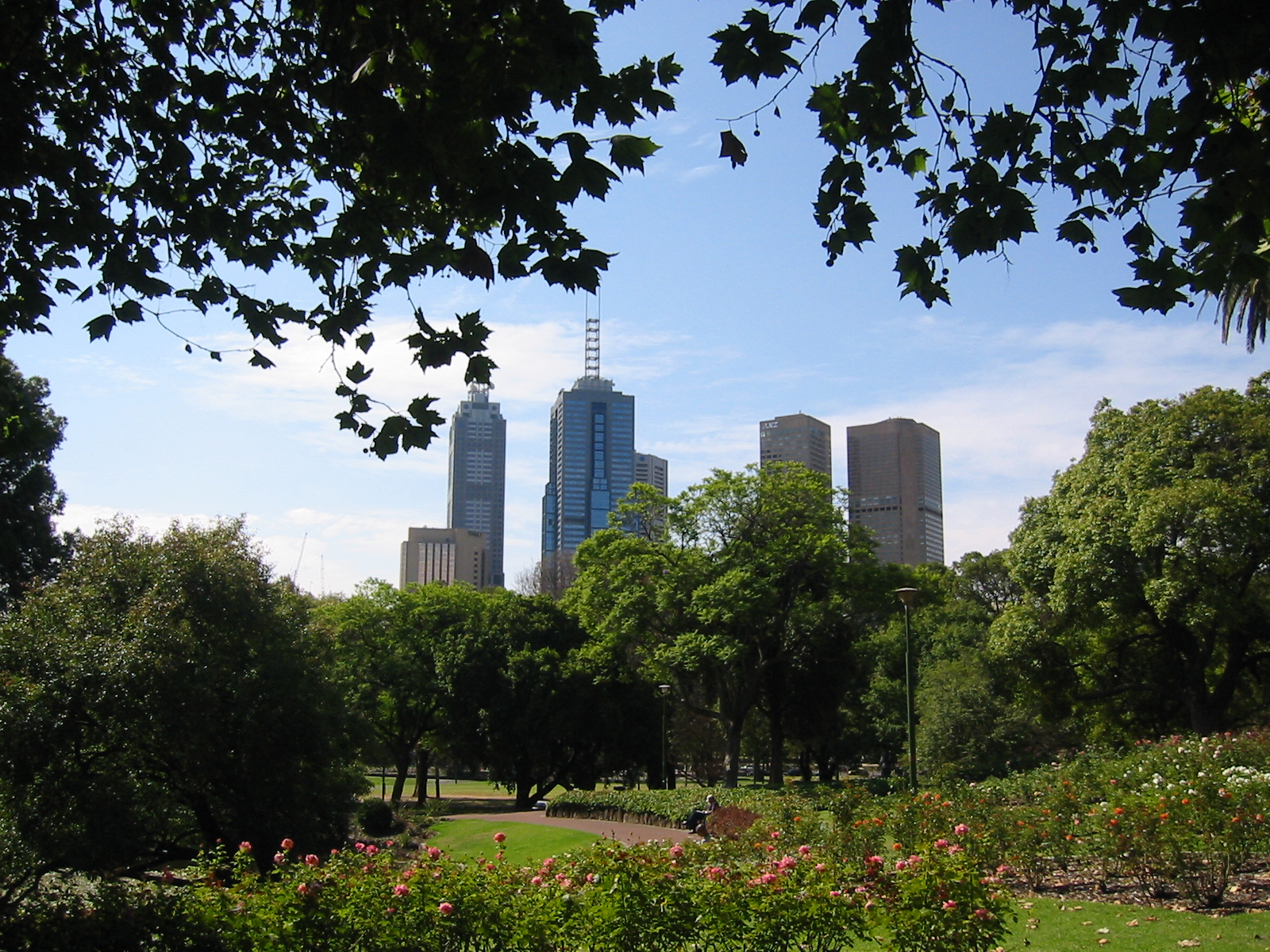
The skyline visible from the Royal Botanic Gardens

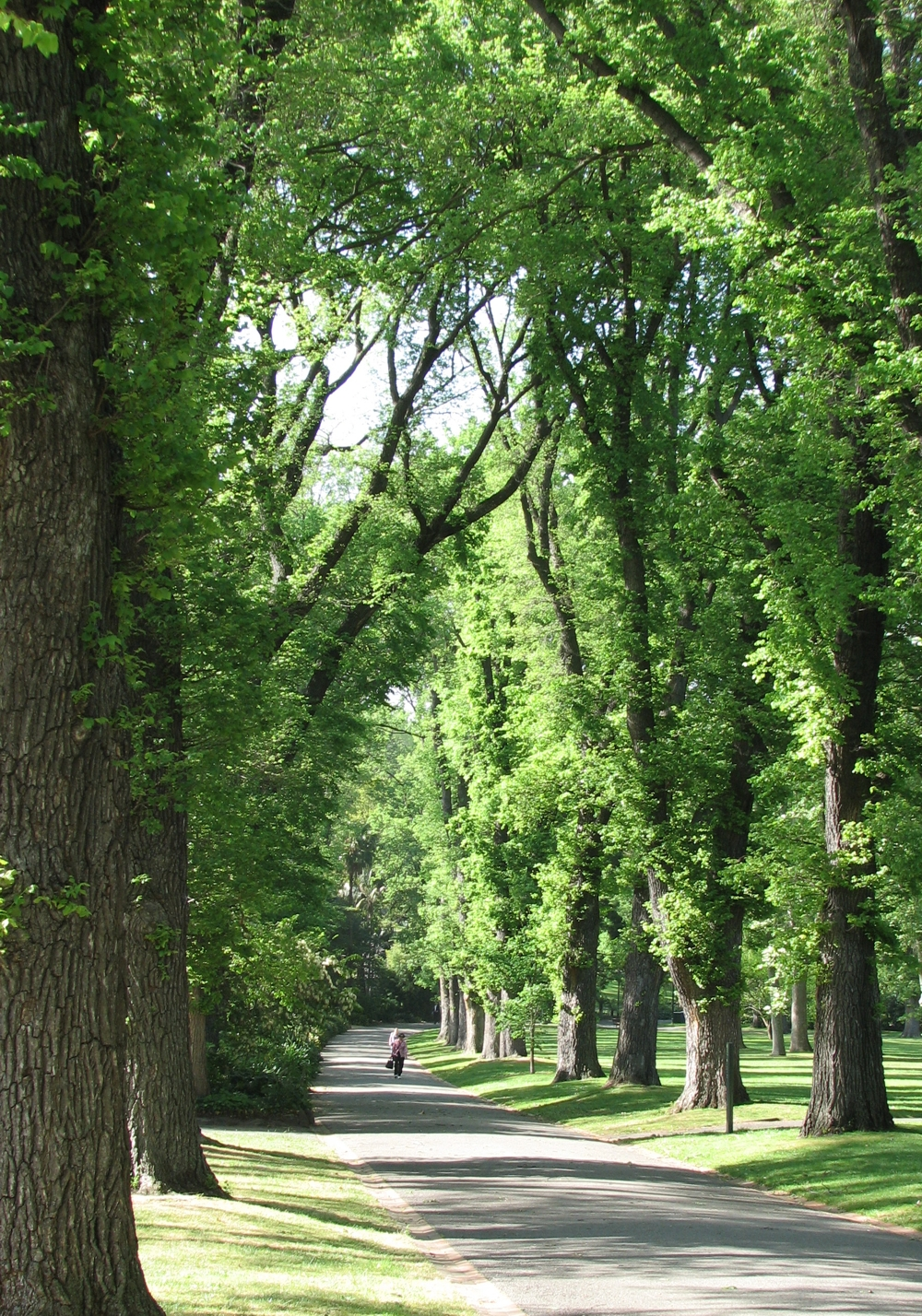
An avenue of English elms in Fitzroy Gardens

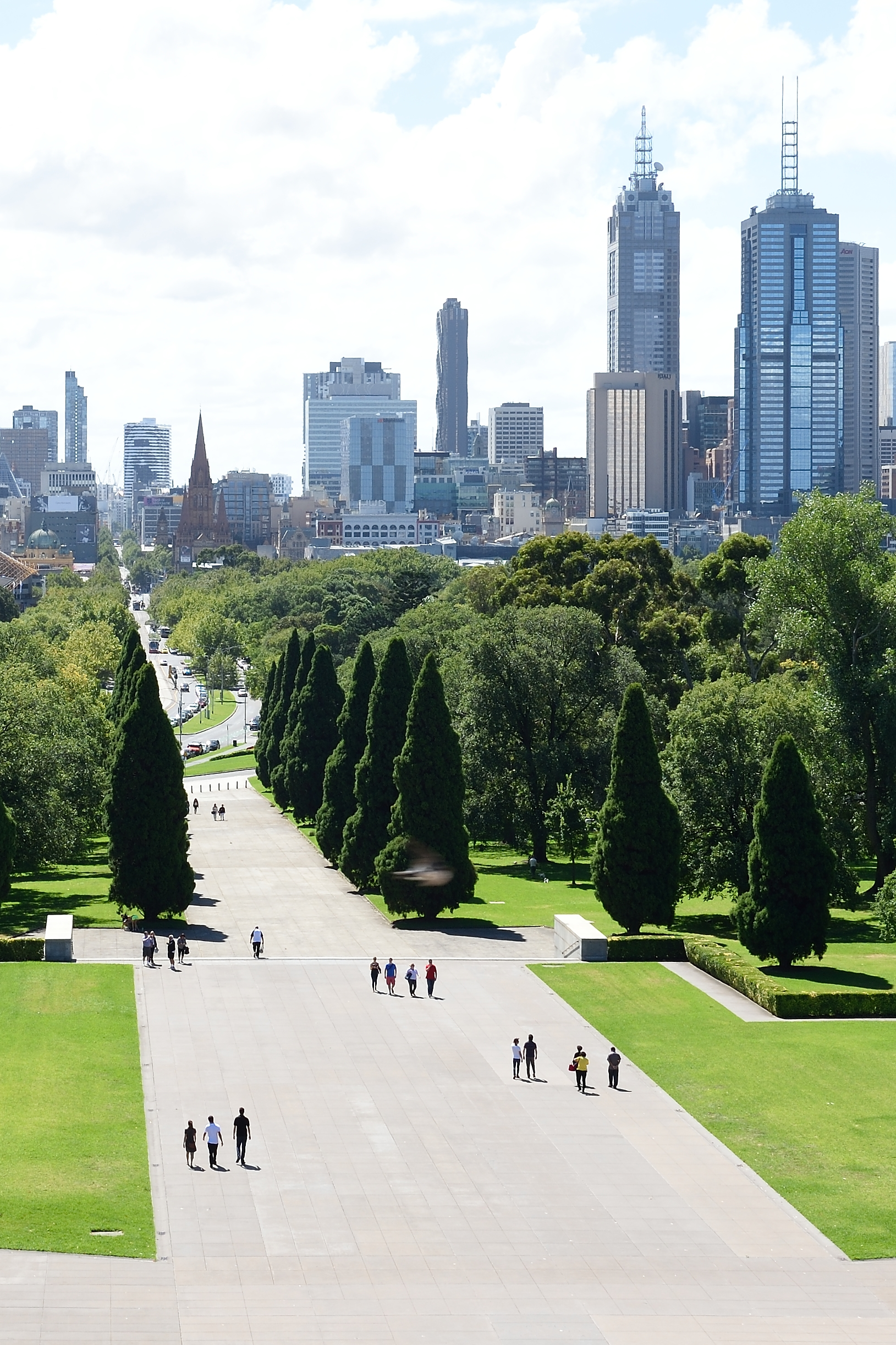
View of the city centre from the Shrine of Remembrance

Melbourne is Australia's second largest city and widely considered to be a garden city, with Victoria being nicknamed "the Garden State". Renowned as one of the most livable cities in the world, there is an abundance of parks, gardens and green belts close to the CBD with a variety of common and rare plant species amid landscaped vistas, pedestrian pathways, and tree-lined avenues, all managed by Parks Victoria.

The first superintendent of the Port Phillip region, Charles La Trobe, set aside large tracts of land around the city for open space, parkland and gardens. Much of this land has since been excised for public infrastructure like sporting complexes, railways, hospitals and other public buildings, and also for residential development, but a substantial amount has remained. This allowed landscape designer Clement Hodgkinson and director of the Royal Botanic Gardens, Melbourne, William Guilfoyle, to landscape many of the parks and gardens. Many of these parks and gardens are within easy walking distance of the central business district.

== Inner suburbs ==
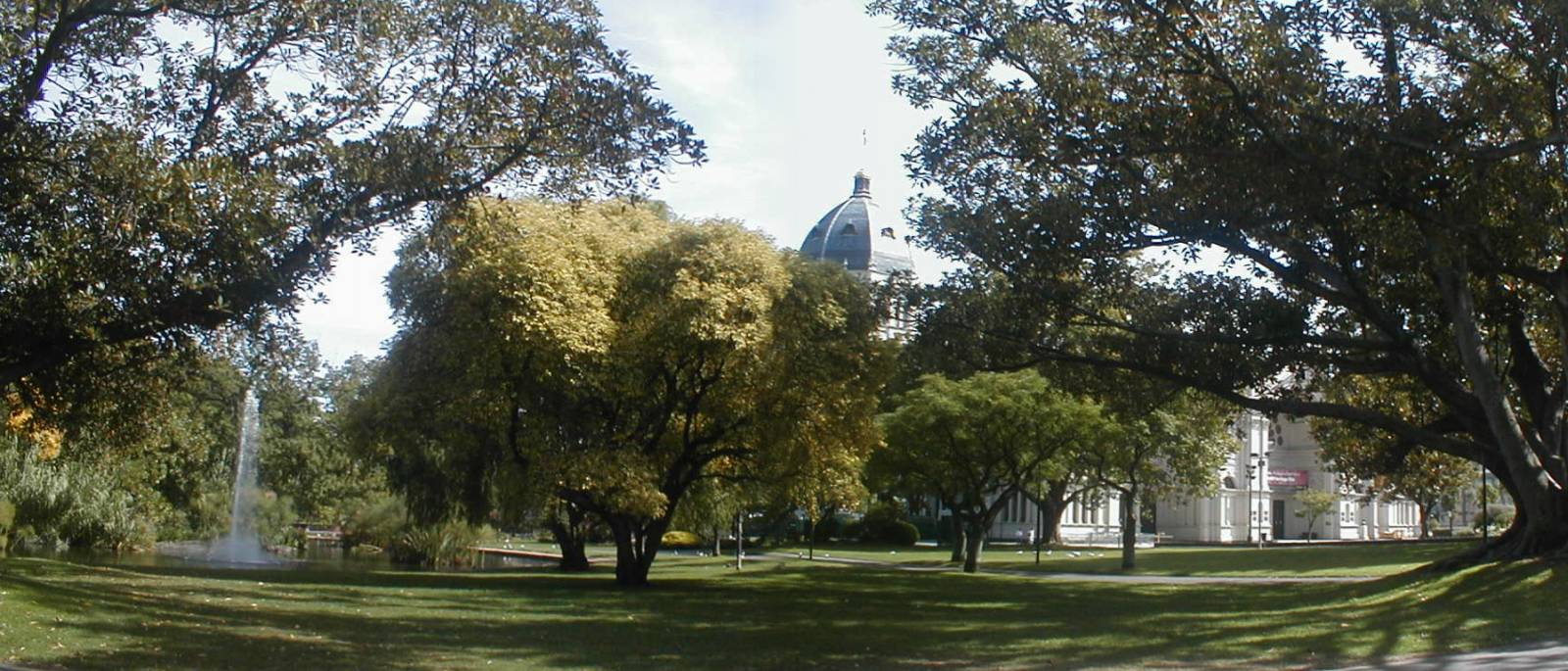
Carlton Gardens south

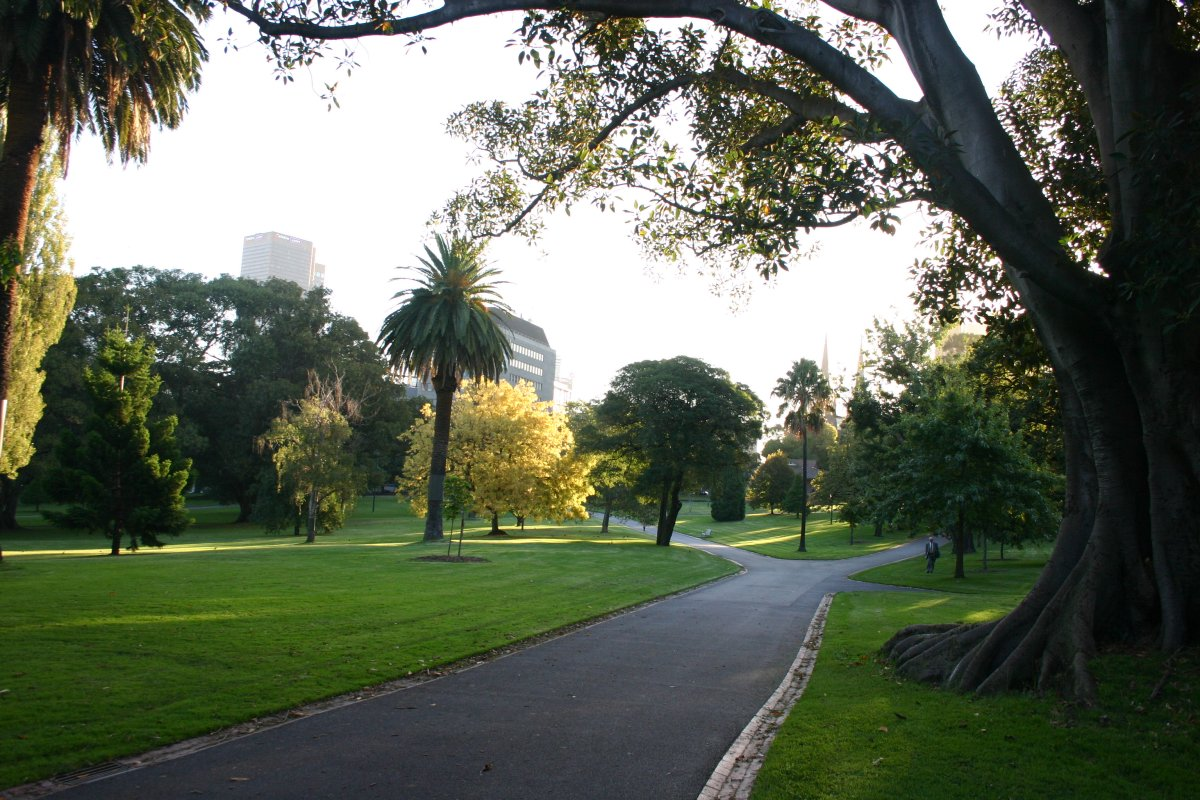
Late afternoon sunlight on the Fitzroy Gardens

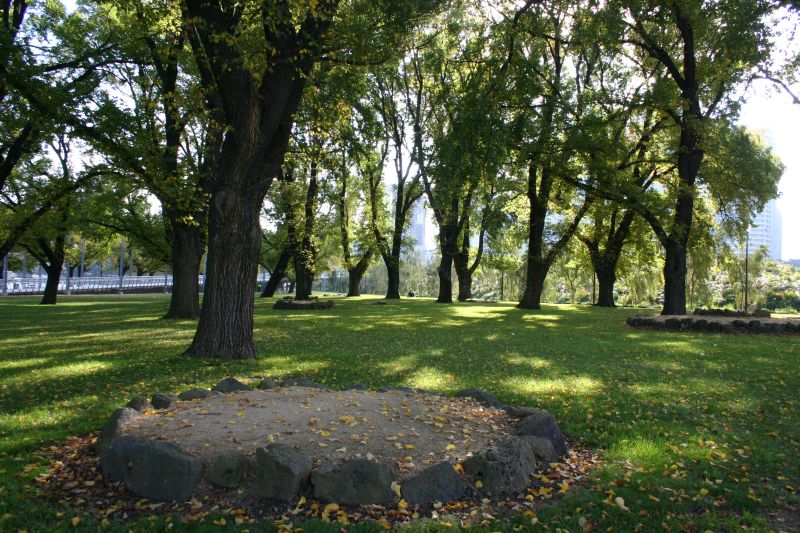
Speaker's mound at Speakers' corner, Birrarung Marr

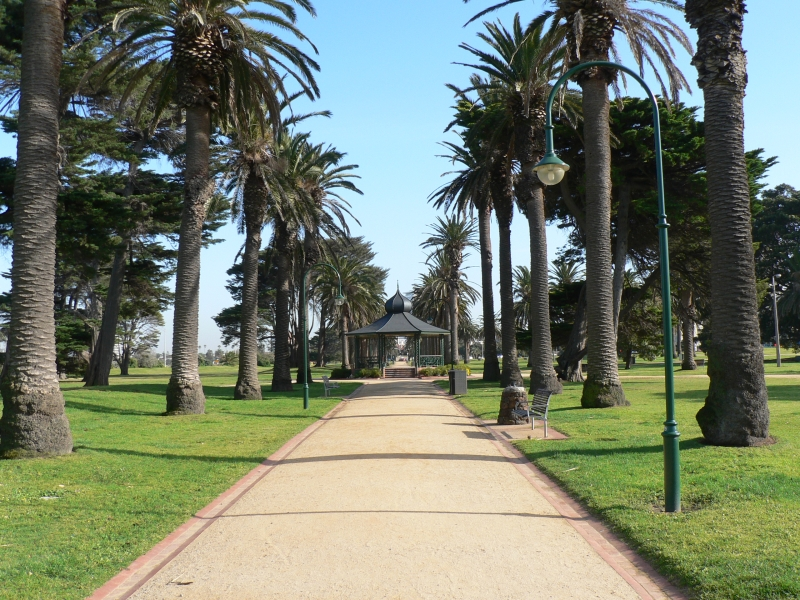
Catani Gardens in St Kilda is typical of the many gardens in the bayside area which are often lined with stands of Canary Island Date Palms.

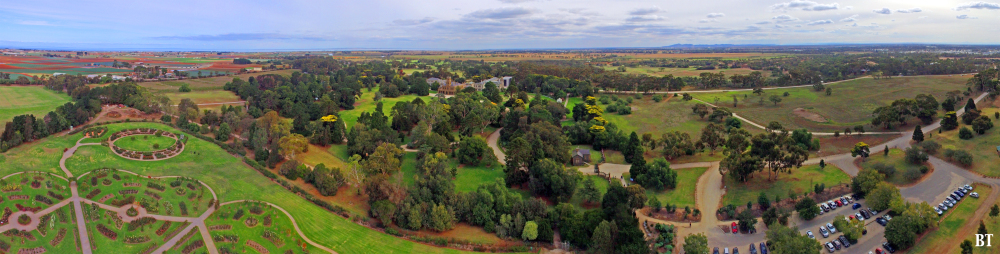
Aerial panorama of the Victoria State Rose Garden in Werribee

- The Flagstaff Gardens (7.2 ha) is one of Melbourne's oldest parks, located just north of the Hoddle Grid, bounded by La Trobe Street (where the namesaked subway station is), Dudley Street, King Street and William Street. Used by office workers at lunchtime, the park contains a memorial to the first Europeans who died in the colony and were buried on the site between 1835 and 1840 when it was the original site of Melbourne Cemetery (later moved).
- The Royal Botanic Gardens (35.4 ha) and Kings Domain (36 ha are two of the most highly regarded gardens), just across the Yarra River from the Melbourne CBD. These gardens, originally a swamp, now house a fine collection of botanical species. The Botanic Gardens were established by Superintendent La Trobe in 1846. Its first curator was John Arthur, a gardener from Heidelberg, who died shortly after. He was succeeded by John Dallachy, who was succeeded by Ferdinand von Mueller. Baron von Mueller was relieved of duties in 1873, and was succeeded by William Guilfoyle, who re-landscaped the gardens extensively and gave them their current form. They are highly prized for their landscaping, with parkland containing lakes, monuments and statues. Queen Elizabeth II granted the title 'Royal' to the Gardens after visiting early in her reign. Walking around the Botanic Gardens there are views of Government House. Kings Domain contains open lawns and stands of both native and exotic trees, which surround Government House, the Shrine of Remembrance and the Sidney Myer Music Bowl. Queen Victoria Gardens (4.8 ha) and Alexandra Gardens (5.2 ha) continue the parkland along St Kilda Road to the banks of the Yarra River. The Pioneer Women's Memorial Garden is also located within Kings Domain.
- The Carlton Gardens (26 ha) and the Royal Exhibition Building are located to the north of the CBD in the suburb of Carlton and are listed as a World Heritage Site. The gardens contain varied European and Australian tree plantings consisting of deciduous English oaks, White Poplars, Plane trees, Elms, Conifers, Cedars, Turkey Oaks, Araucarias and evergreens such as Moreton Bay figs, combined with flower beds of annuals and shrubs. At the south end of the gardens, the Melbourne International Flower and Garden Show is held each April, while the Melbourne Museum and Imax theatre are located to the north of the Exhibition Building. A children's playground can be found in the northern gardens.
- The Royal Park (181 ha) is located four kilometres north of the CBD and features sporting ovals, the State Netball Hockey Centre, the Royal Melbourne Zoological Gardens and the 2006 Commonwealth Games Athlete's Village was constructed on former hospital grounds that were once also part of Royal Park. The exclusive suburb of Parkville was excised from the parkland, as well as the Royal Melbourne Hospital, the Royal Children's Hospital, Melbourne, and University High School. These sites separate it from neighbouring Princes Park (38.6 ha).
- The Treasury Gardens (5.8 ha) and Fitzroy Gardens (26 ha) are located to the east of Spring Street and the CBD. The Treasury Gardens are a short walk from Victoria's Parliament House and are overlooked by the old Treasury buildings, and State Offices. Due to their central location close to the city, they are a popular spot as the starting or ending point for political rallies, demonstrations and festivals, including the annual May Day march, which has been held there since 1999.
- The Fitzroy Gardens are one of the major Victorian era landscaped gardens in Australia designed by Clement Hodgkinson, located across Lansdowne Street from Treasury Gardens. Within the gardens are Captain Cook's Cottage, an ornamental lake, kiosk and café, Model Tudor village, the fairy tree, and a tree scarred by the original Wurundjeri inhabitants.
- The Yarra Park (35.469 ha) is located on the north bank of the Yarra River further east of the CBD, between Richmond and Jolimont railway stations. It makes up part of the Melbourne Sports and Entertainment Precinct, with the Melbourne Cricket Ground located within its boundaries. Initially the area was used as police paddocks for the agistment of police horses, but by the 1860s five recreational ovals were marked out including the MCG oval. The park features several sculptures of Australian sporting heroes and examples of old eucalypt trees which show scars caused by harvesting of bark for canoes by the original inhabitants of the Yarra River Valley. The park stretches to the northern banks of the Yarra River via Gosh's paddock, but is divided by several railway lines linking Richmond station to Flinders Street station, Swan Street and Batman Avenue.
- The Olympic Park stadium was once the precinct of the Friendly Society Gardens. The redevelopment of the railway yards and Federation Square allowed for the creation of a new riverside park, Birrarung Marr (8 ha), opened in 2002. Birrarung Marr has been designed to incorporate long lines of sight towards various landmarks, such as the spire at the Victorian Arts Centre and the towers of St Paul's Cathedral. The park incorporates in the south-eastern corner the original speakers mounds of Speakers Corner, the location for Sunday soapbox oratory and public protests and demonstrations up to 1998, when the site was closed for redevelopment.
- The Albert Park (225 ha) is a large park in the namesaked bayside suburb, built around the 1.8 km-long Albert Park Lake, an important watersport and recreational fishing site in Melbourne, and hosts the Albert Park Yacht Club and Albert Sailing Club, with a 4.7-kilometre (2.9 mi) walking track around the lake. The park is an important site for the sporting culture of Melbourne and Victoria, hosting sports venues such as the Lakeside Stadium, the Melbourne Sports and Aquatic Centre, indoor sports facilities and numerous ovals, as well as the Albert Park Public Golf Course. The annual Australian Grand Prix motor race is held on the Albert Park Circuit around the lake since 1996, and the decision to hold the race there was controversial, with a series of protests organised in 1995 and 1996 by the "Save Albert Park" group, who claimed that the race turned a public park into a private playground for much of the year.
- The St Vincent Gardens, also in the Albert Park suburb, is another park of national significance which provides an example of nineteenth century residential development around a large landscaped square. It was influenced by similar urban design in London, but on such a scale unparalleled in Australia.

Other parks of note in the inner suburbs include Edinburgh Gardens (c. 24 ha) in Fitzroy North, Fawkner Park (41 ha), Como Park and Victoria Gardens in South Yarra, Alma Park and the St Kilda Botanical Gardens in St Kilda, Hedgeley Dene Gardens and Central Park in Malvern, Princes Park in Caulfield, and Footscray Park in Footscray, and Hays Paddock in Kew East.

== Outer suburbs ==
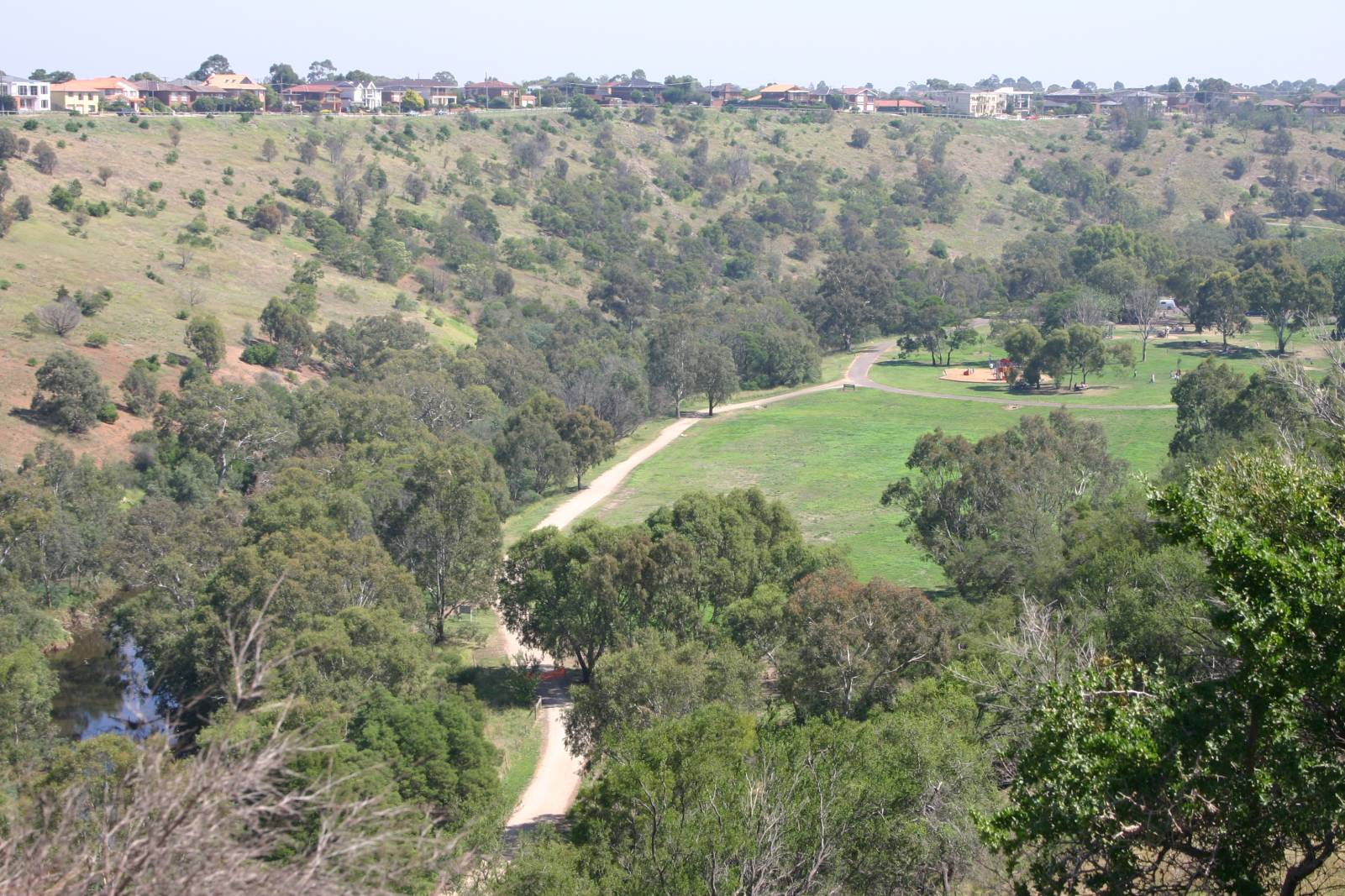
Maribyrnong River at Brimbank Park

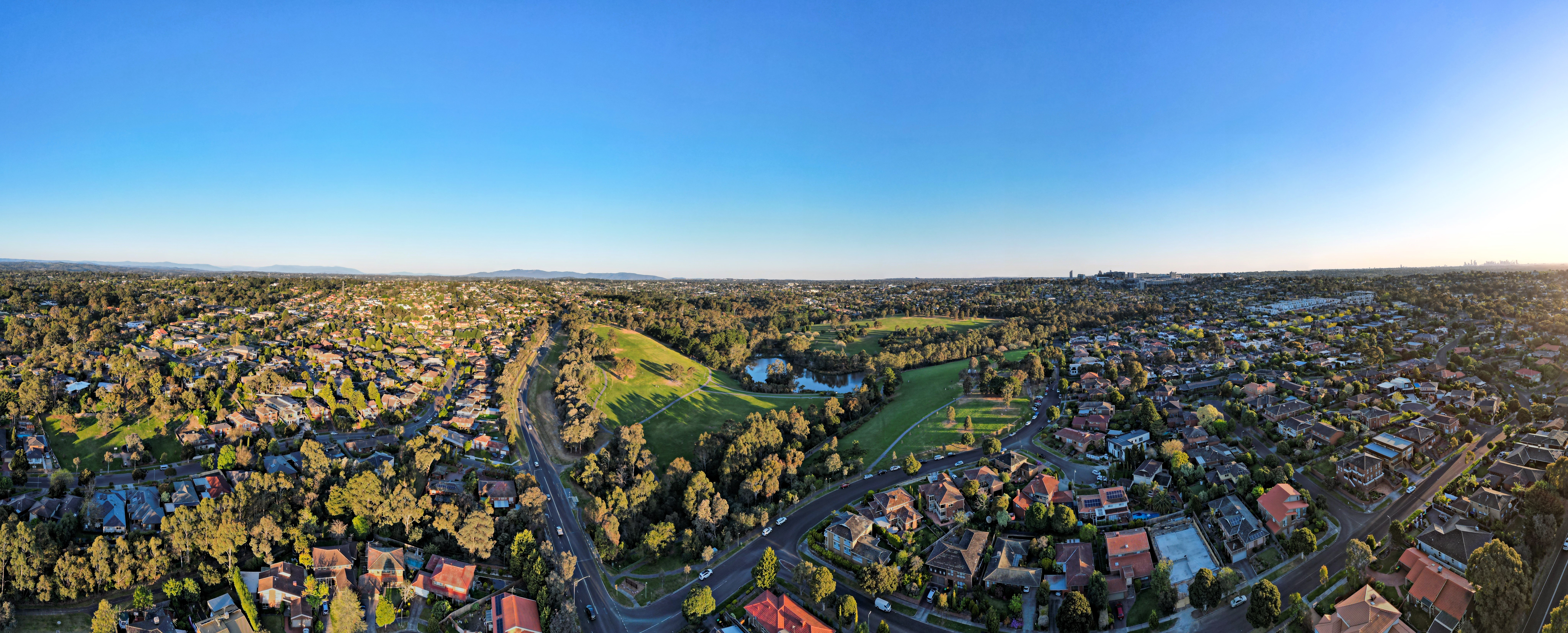
Aerial panorama of Ruffey Lake Park. Sunset 24 September 2023.

While most attention is paid to parks and gardens in the inner urban area around the CBD, extensive and significant parks and rivers can also be found around the outer suburbs of Melbourne. These include:

- Berwick Springs Park, in Berwick and Narre Warren South
- Blackburn Lake Sanctuary – one of the few remaining areas of natural bushland in suburban Melbourne, located in the eastern suburbs at Blackburn
- Braeside Park in Braeside.
- Brimbank Park on the Maribyrnong River in the northwest
- Caribbean Gardens, a privately owned amusement park (now defunct, in process of being converted into a business park) on a large artificial lake along the Corhanwarrabul Creek in Scoresby.
- Chelsea Bicentennial Park, along the Edithvale-Seaford Wetlands in Chelsea
- Cherry Lake, Truganina Coastal Parklands and Altona Coastal Park in the bayside western suburb of Altona.
- Currawong Bush Park in Warrandyte, important remnant native riparian bushland and archaeological site.
- Dandenong Park, in Dandenong.
- Dandenong Valley Parklands, a series of large and small wetland parks along the Dandenong Creek in the eastern/southeastern suburbs.
  - Koomba Park, in Wantirna and Vermont South.
  - Bushy Park Wetlands, in Glen Waverley
  - Napier Park, in Glen Waverley.
  - Nortons Park, in Wantirna South
  - Jells Park, in Wheelers Hill.
  - Tirhatuan Park, in Rowville and Dandenong North.
- Dandenong Wetlands (Melbourne Water Recreation Area), in Dandenong North and Endeavour Hills, with the Dandenong Stadium located on its northwestern corner.
- Footscray Park in the western suburb of Maribyrnong opposite the Flemington Racecourse on the Maribyrnong River.
- Heatherton Park, in Clayton South.
- Karkarook Park in Heatherton (formerly under Moorabbin), a lacustrine/wetland sanctuary created from a revegetated sand mine.
- Pipemakers Park, a park in Maribyrnong recycled from a historic pipemaking industrial site and includes a museum, wharf, garden, wetlands, BBQ areas and the Maribyrnong River trail.
- Marie Wallace Bayswater Park, in Bayswater
- Newport Lakes Park, a 33-hectare bushland oasis created from a former bluestone quarry and rubbish tip site in the middle of Newport.
- Royal Botanic Gardens, Cranbourne, in Cranbourne, emphasising Australian plants.
- Organ Pipes National Park, a 121 hectares protected area located in Keilor North off the Calder Highway, 20 km to the northwest of Melbourne city.
- Point Cook Coastal Park, Point Cook Homestead, Cheetham Wetlands and RAAF Aircraft Museum in Point Cook.
- Spring Valley Park, in Springvale South.
- Tatterson Park, in Keysborough
- Wattle Park in the eastern suburb of Surrey Hills with its historical connection to Melbourne's tram network.
- Werribee Park in Werribee, which includes the Werribee Park Mansion, the Victoria State Rose Garden, the Werribee Park National Equestrian Centre, the Werribee Open Range Zoo, a contemporary sculpture walk and a Heritage Orchard.
- Westerfolds Park and Yarra Bend Park on the Yarra River.
- Willamstown Botanic Gardens at the bayside western suburb of Williamstown.

Other suburban rivers/creeks with fantastic trails and reserves and within 20 km of the CBD include Merri Creek, Moonee Ponds Creek, Kororoit Creek, Plenty River, Darebin Creek and Eumemmerring Creek.

== Dandenong Ranges ==
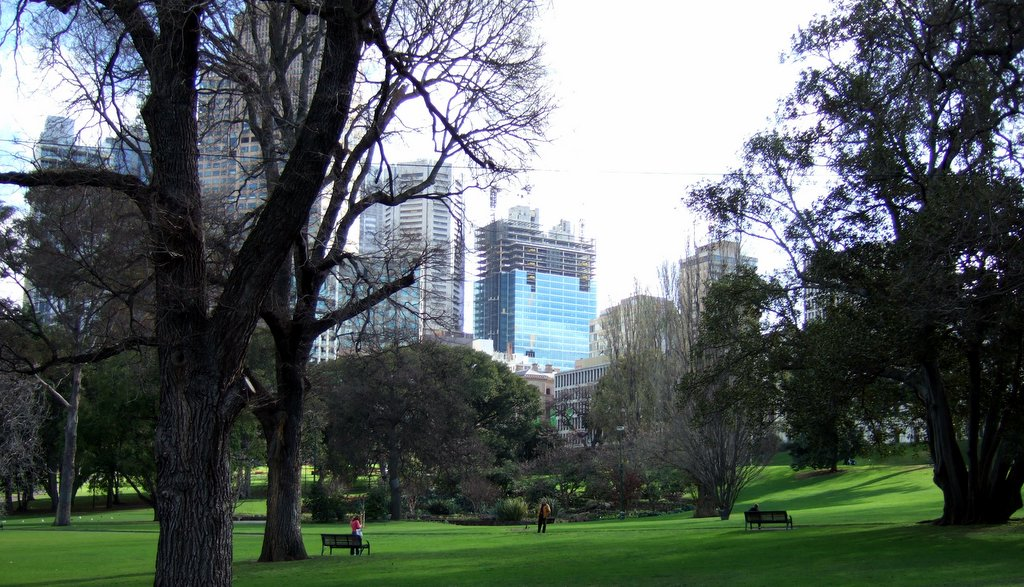
Treasury Gardens in winter

The Dandenong Ranges to the east of Melbourne are famous for their gardens, which are established on rich volcanic soil in a high rainfall area. A popular pastime during autumn is to drive through the hills viewing the vibrant foliage of deciduous trees. Some public gardens in the Ranges include:

- William Ricketts Sanctuary at Mount Dandenong
- Dandenong Ranges Botanic Garden at Olinda
- Alfred Nicholas Gardens
- George Tindale Garden
- Mount Dandenong Arboretum
- Pirianda Garden, Olinda
- Karwarra Australian Native Botanic Garden (rear of Kalorama Memorial Reserve) Kalorama

== Private gardens ==
Residential gardening is a popular pastime throughout Melbourne, and the city is known for its leafy green suburbs. Many private gardens open for public viewing through Australia's Open Garden Scheme, which started in Melbourne.

== See also ==
- Australia's Open Garden Scheme
- Gardening in Australia
- Heritage gardens in Australia
- Protected areas of Victoria
