= Lanes of Perth, Western Australia =

The lanes and arcades of Perth, Western Australia are collectively becoming culturally important to the city.

In 2007 changes to Liquor Licensing Regulations in Western Australia opened up the opportunities for small bars. This was followed in August 2008 by the City of Perth formally adopting a laneways enhancement strategy, "Forgotten Spaces – Revitalising Perth's Laneways".

== Shafto Lane ==
Shafto Lane links Hay and Murray Streets. It was originally two lanes, Chipper Lane from Hay Street to Murray Street and Barratt Lane from Murray Street to Wellington Street. Chipper Lane was originally the internal laneway for the Chipper property. On 10 June 1889, Donald J Chipper established an undertaker, coachbuilder & wheelwright business at the Murray Street end and two retail shops were at the Hay Street end. In between, were stables and workshops. In 1898, Chipper ceased coachbuilding and wheelwrighting and moved the funeral home to the Hay Street end. Barratt Lane, named after Enoch Pearson Barratt, a convict who established Western Australia's first nursery. Barratt owned land on Murray Street, which ran through to Wellington Street. He was also employed as the gardener for the Government Gardens, now known as Stirling Gardens. In December 1929 the City of Perth resolved to rename Barratt Lane to Shafto Lane. The renaming recognised Thomas Alfred Shafto, who was a City of Perth councillor for twelve years, a failed mayoral candidate and owner of the Shaftsbury Hotel and Shaftsbury Theatre. From the 1930s to the 1970s the lane was called Perdriau Place, with Coventry’s on both sides (one for Ford the other for Nasco) at the Hay Street end, the businesses along Perdriau Place providing motor repairs and services.

== Wolf Lane ==
In 2001 the Perth City Council identified the potential for the redevelopment of Wolf Lane into a secondary and distinctive retail area within the King Street precinct. The Council spent $315,000 upgrading Wolf Lane. Wolf Lane includes small bars: Wolfe Lane Bar, Cheeky Sparrow and hairdresser Toni & Guy.

In 2014 Form, a Western Australian art consultancy, staged a public art festival, which produced a number of large-scale urban artworks developed by International and Australian urban artists. Works in Wolf Lane included those by Maya Hyuk (New York, US), Alexis Diaz (Puerto Rico, US), Hyuro (Argentina), Luke Cornish aka E.L.K. (Canberra, AUS), ROA (Belgium) and Hurben (Perth, Western Australia).

== Howard Lane ==
Howard Lane is a U-shaped laneway that runs parallel to and west of Howard Street, between St Georges Terrace to the north and The Esplanade to the south. Access to the lane is off Howard Street. Howard Lane was upgraded by the City of Perth in 2009, and features a series of artworks commissioned by Stormie Mills and Yok. In May 2010, the Council received the Australian Institute of Landscape Architects (WA Chapter) Award in Design for the Howard Lane Upgrade. Howard Lane includes two small bars, Andaluz and Helvetica.

== Prince Lane ==
Prince Lane connects Wellington and Murray Streets, parallel to and west of King Street. It was upgraded by the City of Perth in 2012-13 for $800,000 (AUS). The upgrading included new gutters, granite kerbs, lighting and a series of artworks along the length of the laneway, commissioned from well-known Western Australian artists: Clare McFarlane; Denise Brown; Stephen Genovese; Jae Criddle; Paul Caporn and Leanne Bray and Stormie Mills.

== Grand Lane ==
Grand Lane runs between Murray Street Mall (north side), near the junction with Barrack Street, almost through to Wellington Street where it branches east to Barrack Street. The name of the lane relates to the former Grand Theatre, which used to occupy a prominent site on the south-western side of the laneway. It was upgraded by the City of Perth in 2011 for $500,000 (AUS), the works include a 99-metre mural on the western wall by Victorian artists Bonsai and Twoone, an artwork on the eastern wall by Timothy Rollin, and a mural by Chris Nixon. At the north end of the laneway is Foodchain's Light Locker Art Space, a peer-curated exhibition space for emerging Perth artists.

== Mercantile Lane ==
Mercantile Lane links St Georges Terrace and Mounts Bay Road, adjacent to the Brookfield Place development. The name of the lane reflects that it abuts the former MLC building on St Georges Terrace.

== Munster Lane ==
Munster Lane is a U-shaped laneway that runs parallel to and west of King Street, between Hay Street to the south and Murray Street to the north. Access to Munster Lane is from King Street.

== McLean Lane ==
McLean Lane links Murray Street and Wellington Street, running between a multi-storey car park (Pier Street Car Park) and a former gasworks building (which is occupied by arts group, Artsource, as studio space). In 2009 the City of Perth sought to rename the lane, Gasworks Lane.
