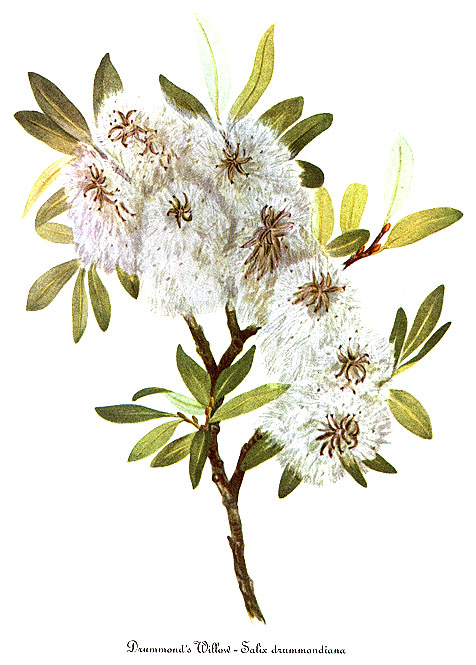

Conservation status
- Apparently Secure (NatureServe)

Scientific classification
- Kingdom: Plantae
- Clade: Tracheophytes
- Clade: Angiosperms
- Clade: Eudicots
- Clade: Rosids
- Order: Malpighiales
- Family: Salicaceae
- Genus: Salix
- Species: S. drummondiana

Binomial name
- Salix drummondiana Barrat ex Hook.

= Salix drummondiana =

Species of willow

Salix drummondiana is a species of willow known by the common name Drummond's willow. It is native to western North America from Yukon and the Northwest Territories in the north to California and New Mexico in the south. It is a resident of moist mountain habitats, including forests, riverbanks, and floodplains.

== Description ==
Salix drummondiana is a shrub growing one to five meters tall. Its brittle branches are hairless to velvety when new, becoming waxy and shiny with age. The leaves are lance-shaped to oval and pointed, with smooth or rippled edges that roll under slightly. The leaves are up to 8.5 centimeters long and are woolly on the undersides and hairless to lightly hairy on the top surfaces. New leaves are coated in silky hairs.

The inflorescences are produced before the leaves. Each is a catkin of flowers. Male catkins are 2 to 4 centimeters long, and female catkins can be almost 9 centimeters in length, lengthening further as the fruits develop. This willow primarily reproduces sexually, by seed, but it can also reproduce vegetatively from stem fragments; this often happens when the shrub is broken up by a flood and pieces of the stem are washed away and deposited in a new area.

This willow is an important winter food for moose in many areas, and beavers use it for food and to build their dams.
