= Barrat =

Barrat is a French surname. Notable people with the surname include:

- Claude Barrat (c. 1658 – c. 1711), Canadian legal professional
- Georgie Barrat (1989), British tech journalist and television presenter
- James Barrat (1960), American documentary filmmaker, speaker, and author
- Martine Barrat (1933), French photographer, actress, dancer and writer
- Rex Barrat (1914–1974), French artist known especially for his landscape paintings
- Robert Barrat (1889–1970), American stage, motion picture, and television character actor
