= Stirling Gardens =

Park in Perth, Western Australia

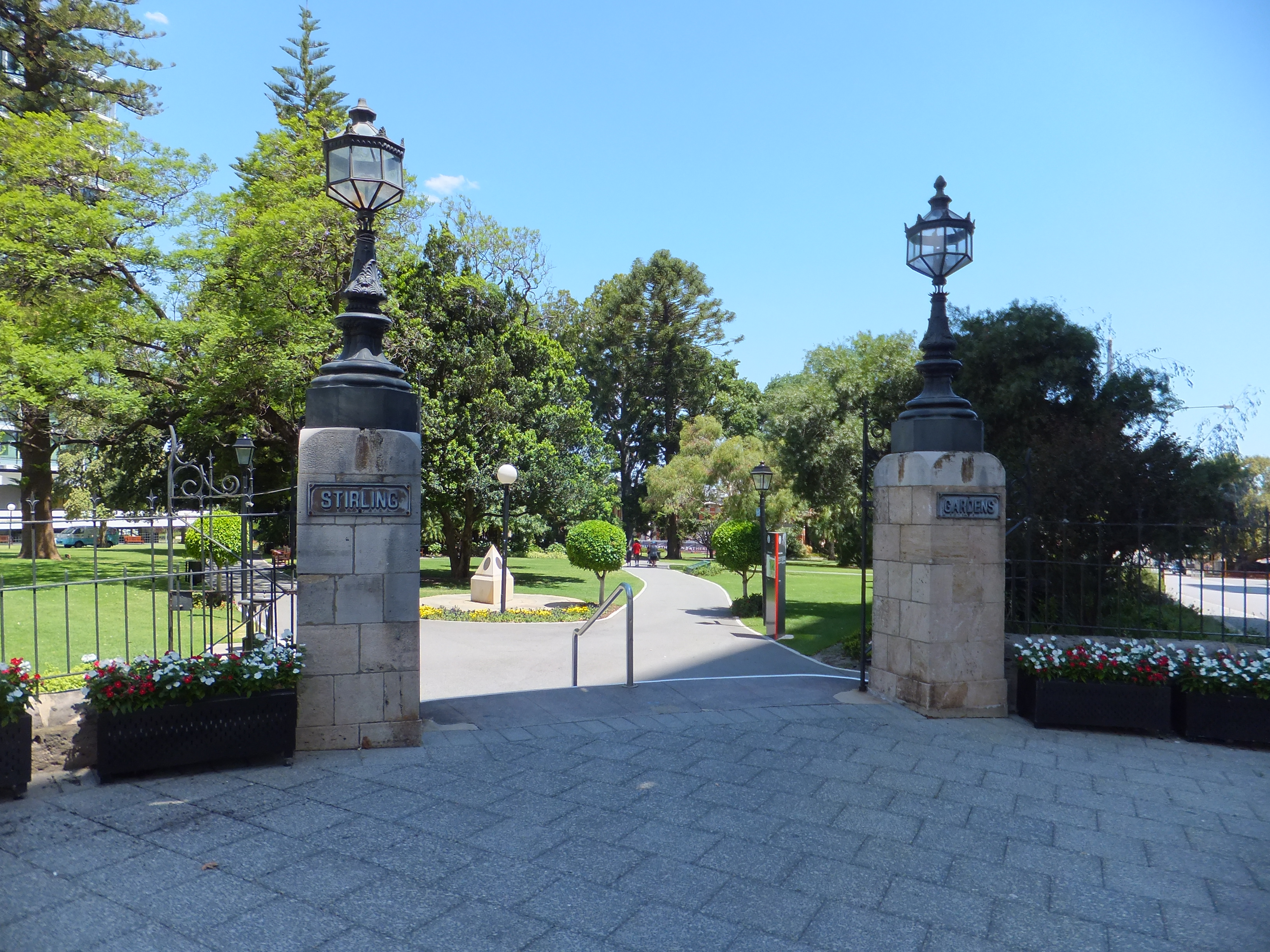
- Stirling Gardens

- Location within Perth
- Type: Urban park
- Location: Perth, Western Australia
- Coordinates: 31°57′23″S 115°51′36″E
- Created: 1845
- Etymology: Named after James Stirling
- Operator: City of Perth
- Status: Open

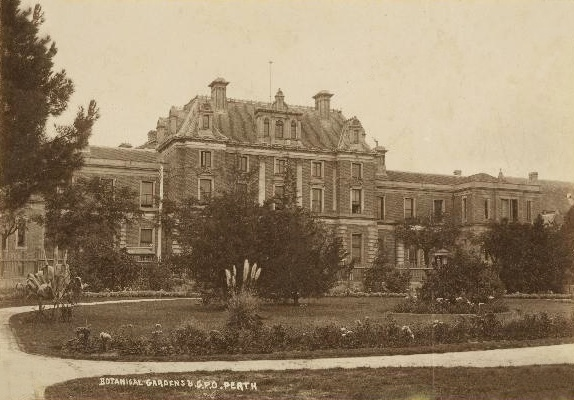
1890s postcard showing Stirling Gardens with the Old Treasury Buildings (then the General Post Office) across St Georges Tce in the background

Stirling Gardens is a small public park in Perth, Western Australia.

Located on the corner of St Georges Terrace and Barrack Street, west of the Government House and north of the Supreme Court buildings, it contains a group of significant sculpture items.

== History ==
Originally established by the Perth Vineyard Society in 1845 with government approval, the gardens were leased to Henry Laroche Cole for a ten-year period in 1846, and were eventually returned to government control at the end of that period. In 1868 Enoch Barratt was appointed as the Government Gardener to tend Government Gardens (now known as Stirling Gardens), a position which he held until he retired in 1880.

It is one of a series of landscape features that is classified by the National Trust.

The statue of Alexander Forrest, the brother of John Forrest, was constructed by Pietro Porcelli. It was first made in Guildford clay, then in plaster of Paris, sent to Italy to cast it in wax and finally in bronze, unveiled by Premier Walter James on 28 August 1903, and moved to its current location in 1916.

Stirling Gardens has been called Stirling Square in the past, despite the coincidence of a square of the same name in Guildford.

== See also ==
- Australia's Open Garden Scheme
- Gardening in Australia
- Heritage gardens in Australia
- Supreme Court Gardens, separated from Stirling Gardens by the Supreme Court buildings
