= Hedgeley Dene Gardens =

Public park in Melbourne, Australia

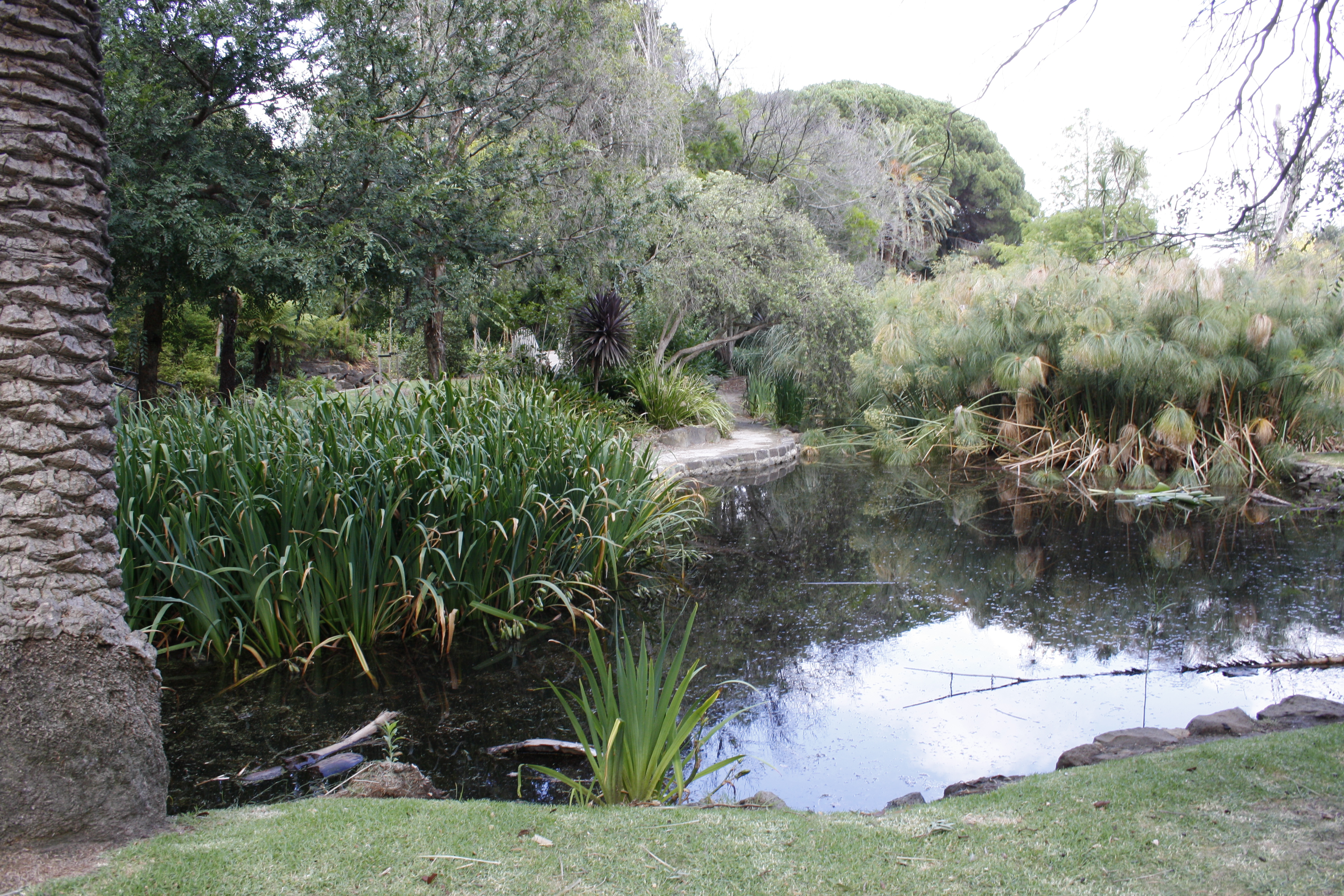
- The gardens in 2012

- Location within Melbourne
- Interactive map of Hedgeley Dene Gardens
- Type: Urban park
- Location: Malvern, Melbourne, Victoria, Australia
- Coordinates: 37°52′08″S 145°03′14″E
- Opened: 1925; 101 years ago
- Etymology: Hedgerley
- Operator: City of Stonnington
- Status: Open
- Terrain: Flat; riverbank
- Water: Gardiners Creek
- Vegetation: European garden
- Public transit: – Darling; – 624
- Facilities: Ornamental bridges and paths; ornamental lake; plantings; seating; toilets
- Website: melbourne.vic.gov.au

The Hedgeley Dene Gardens is an urban park located in the suburb of Malvern East in the eastern suburbs of Melbourne, Victoria, Australia. The gardens forms part of a network of linear open spaces in Melbourne's eastern suburbs in the City of Stonnington and City of Boroondara local government areas, formed along drainage easements and watercourses such as Gardiners Creek.

== Description ==
The land on Gardiners Creek was purchased by solicitor Edward Charsley in 1877, naming it after his English birthplace, Hedgerley. A golf course was established later, using the natural waterholes as water hazards. From 1902 to 1911 the grounds were used as a dairy farm. The waterholes and dam became a popular fishing and yabbying spot, known as Maidment’s Lakes.

The former City of Malvern purchased 3.4 hectares (8.5 acres) when the land was subdivided in 1911, using it as a quarry, then as a municipal tip, until it was cleared after World War I. Returned soldiers planted Turkey Oaks, and the gardens were developed from 1924.

A popular park in the Malvern East locality, the gardens are an example of public open space design that recreates the qualities of an informal, picturesque English garden or northern European landscape in an Australian suburb, laid out in the inter-war style of gardens. The gardens include mature trees, perimeter garden display beds, an ornamental lake and bridged path system, linear paths, c. 1930s cast iron lamp posts, lawns, seating, and toilets. The gardens are listed on the non-statutory heritage register of the City of Stonnington.

== Gallery ==
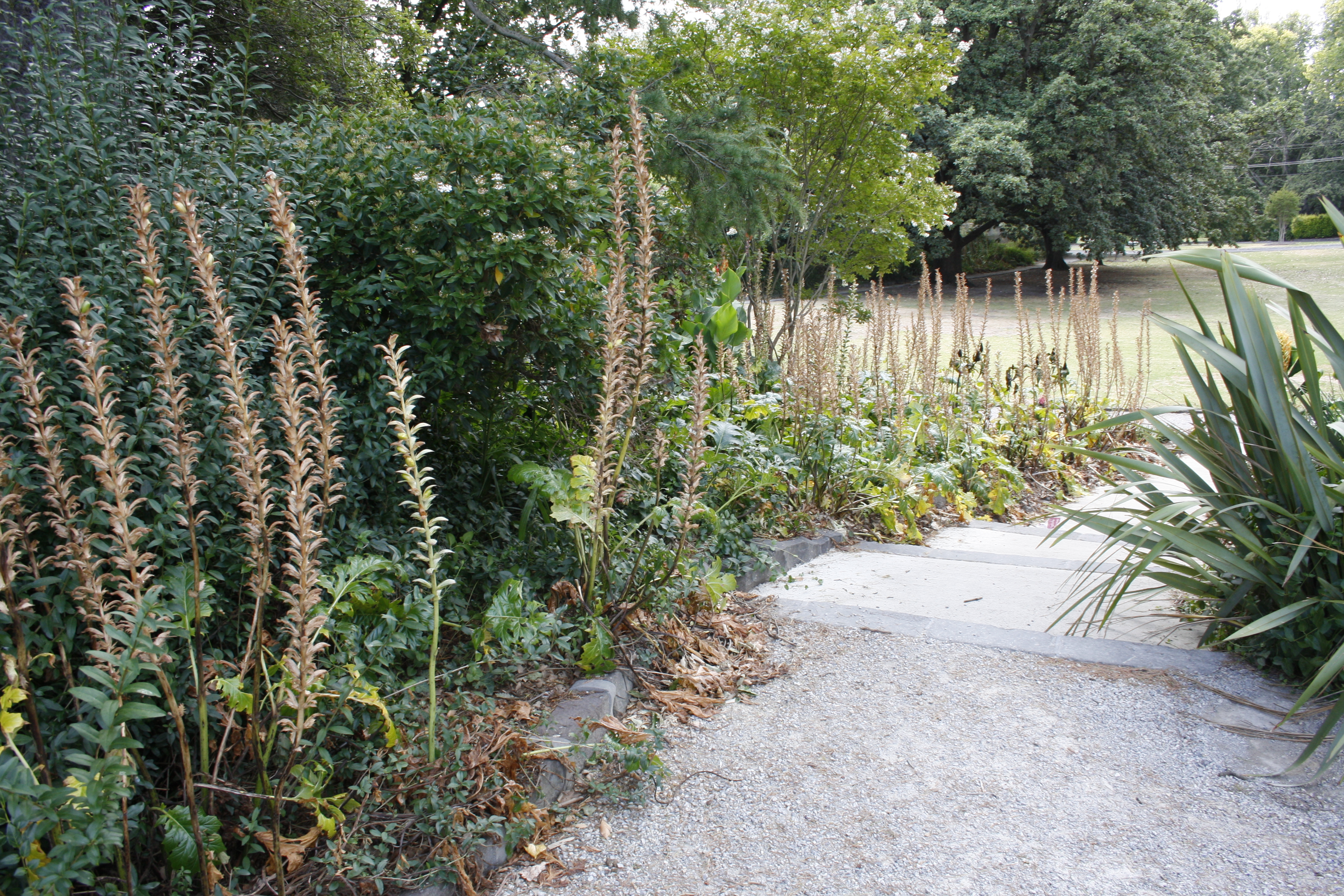
The gardens in 2012

== See also ==
- Parks and gardens of Melbourne
