= Caribbean Gardens =

Former market and amusement park in Melbourne, Australia

Coordinates: 37.908°S 145.228°E

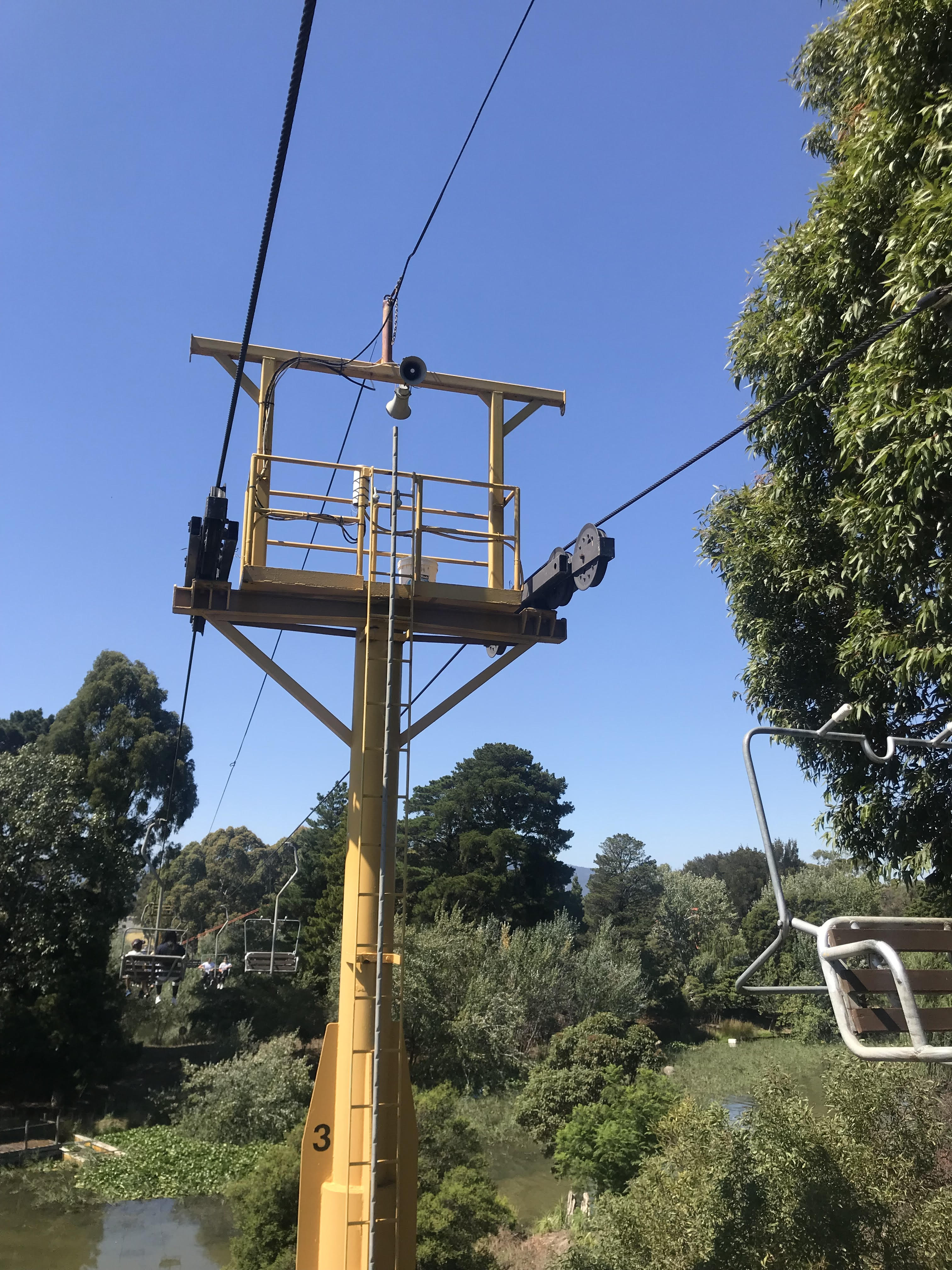
Caribbean Gardens Chairlift which offered scenic views over Lake Caribbean and Caribbean Park.

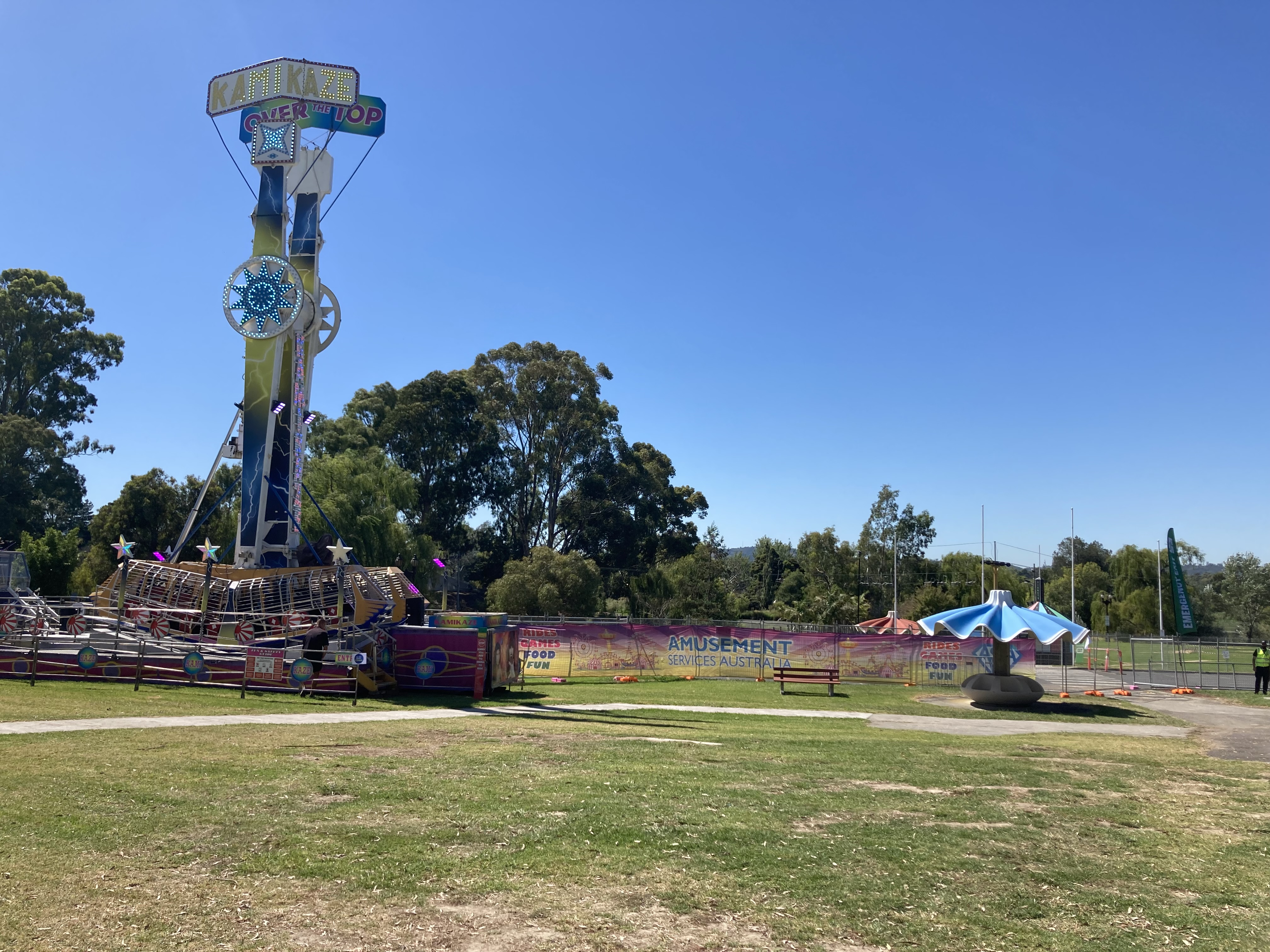
Caribbean Gardens is now being leased by Events Central and used for hosting festivals and other events.

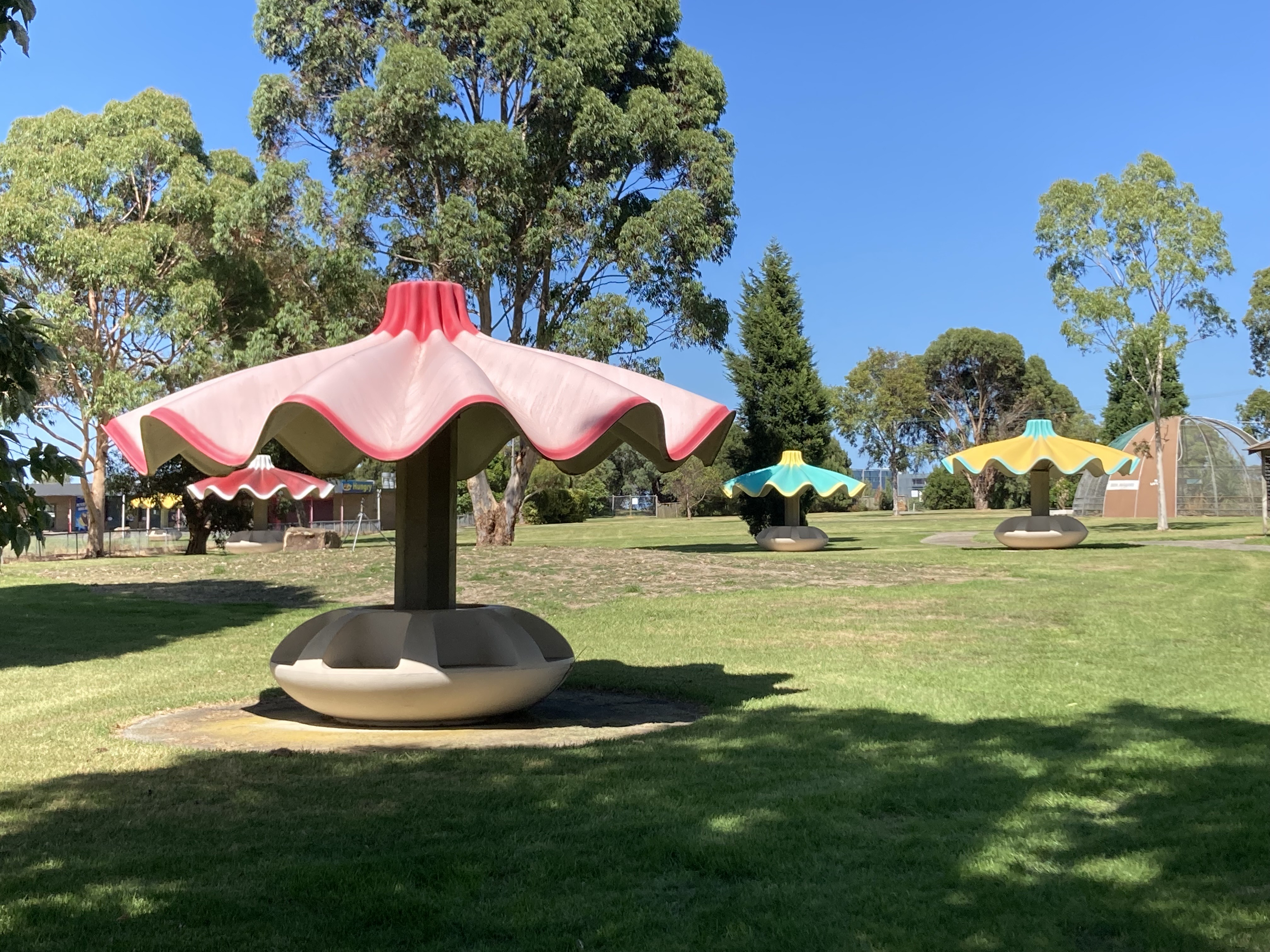
Umbrellas and former monkey dome/bird cage

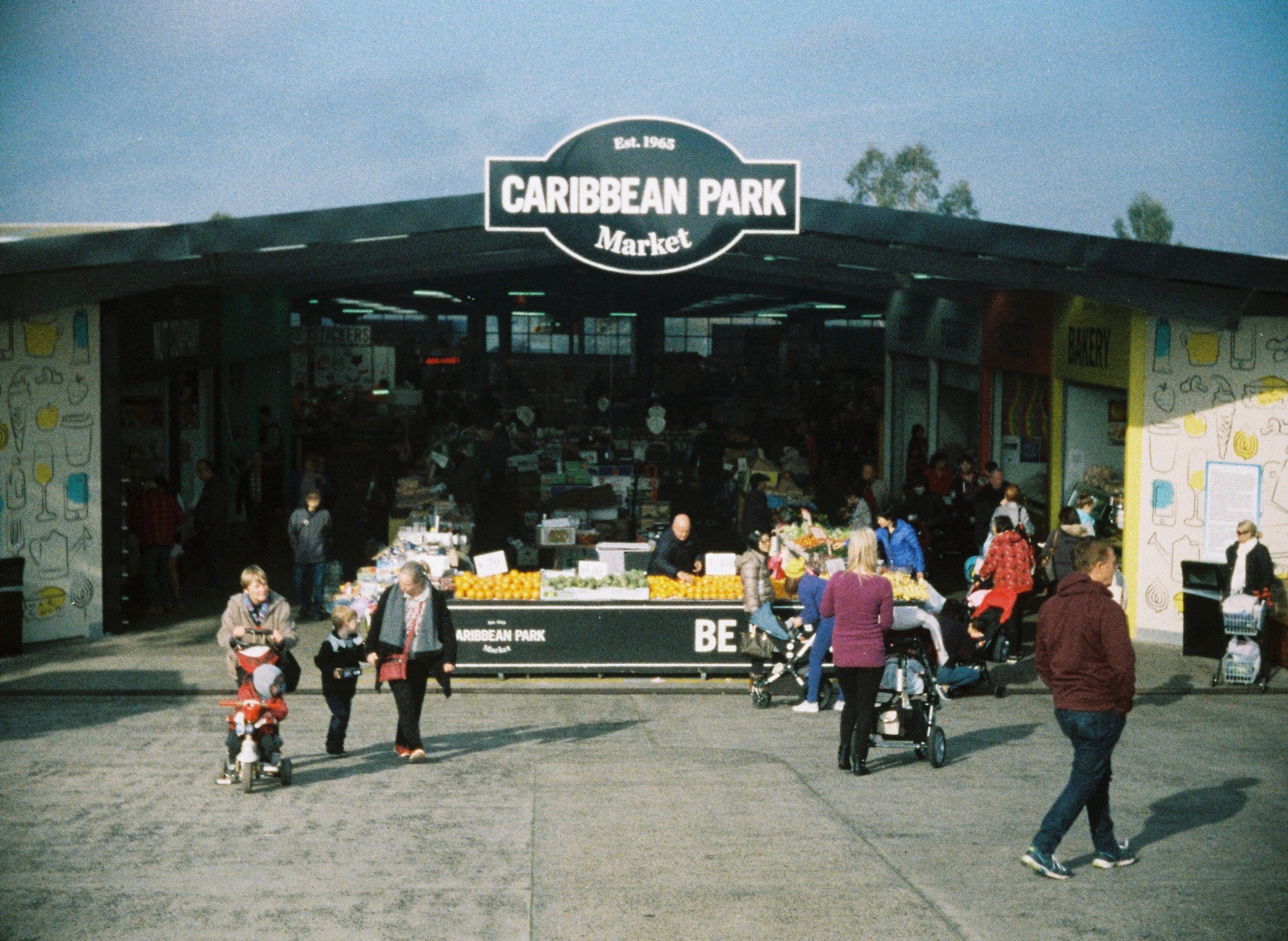
Caribbean Gardens

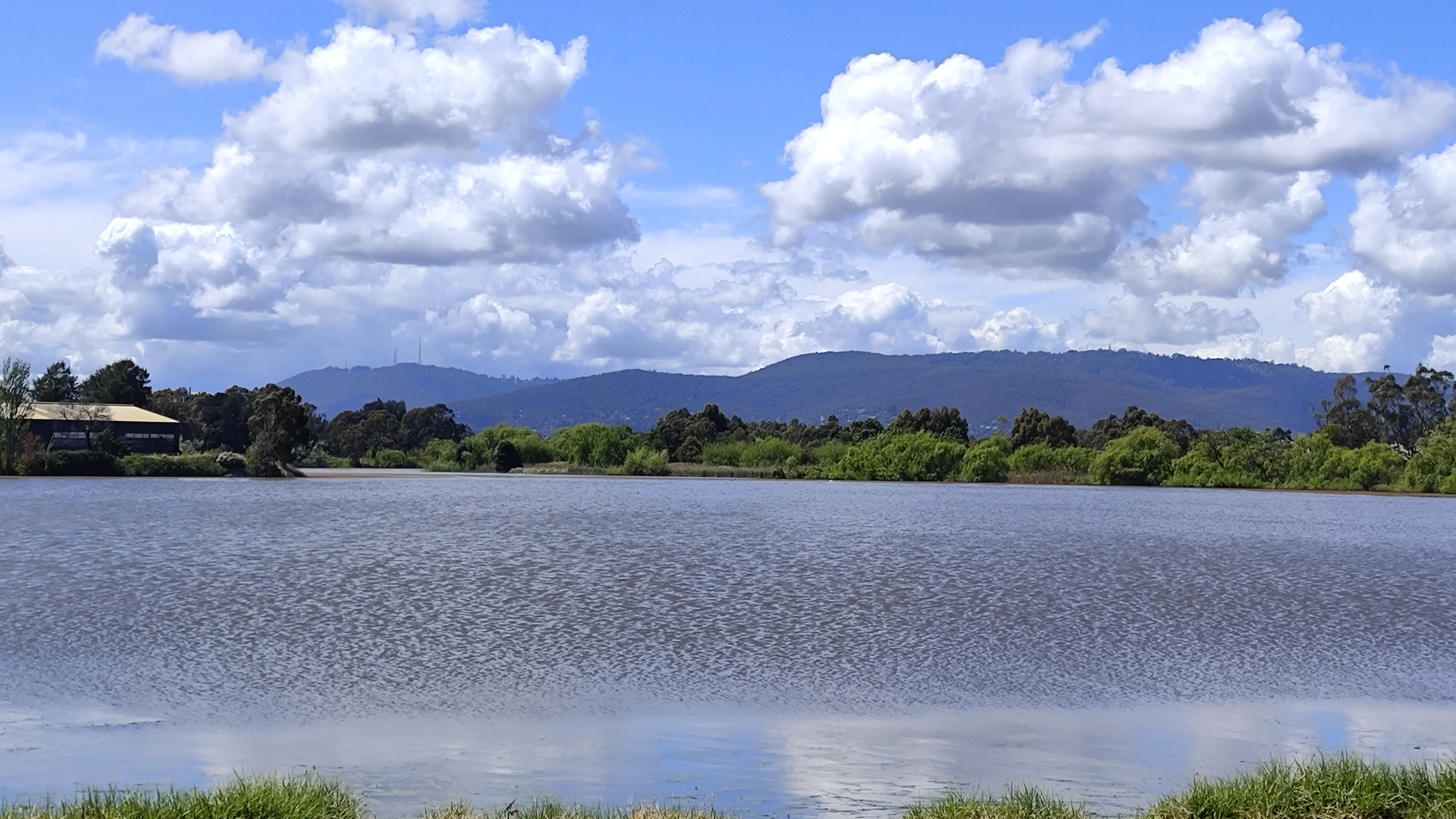
The widest western portion of Caribbean Lake, with Caribbean Market on the left and the Dandenong Ranges in the far background

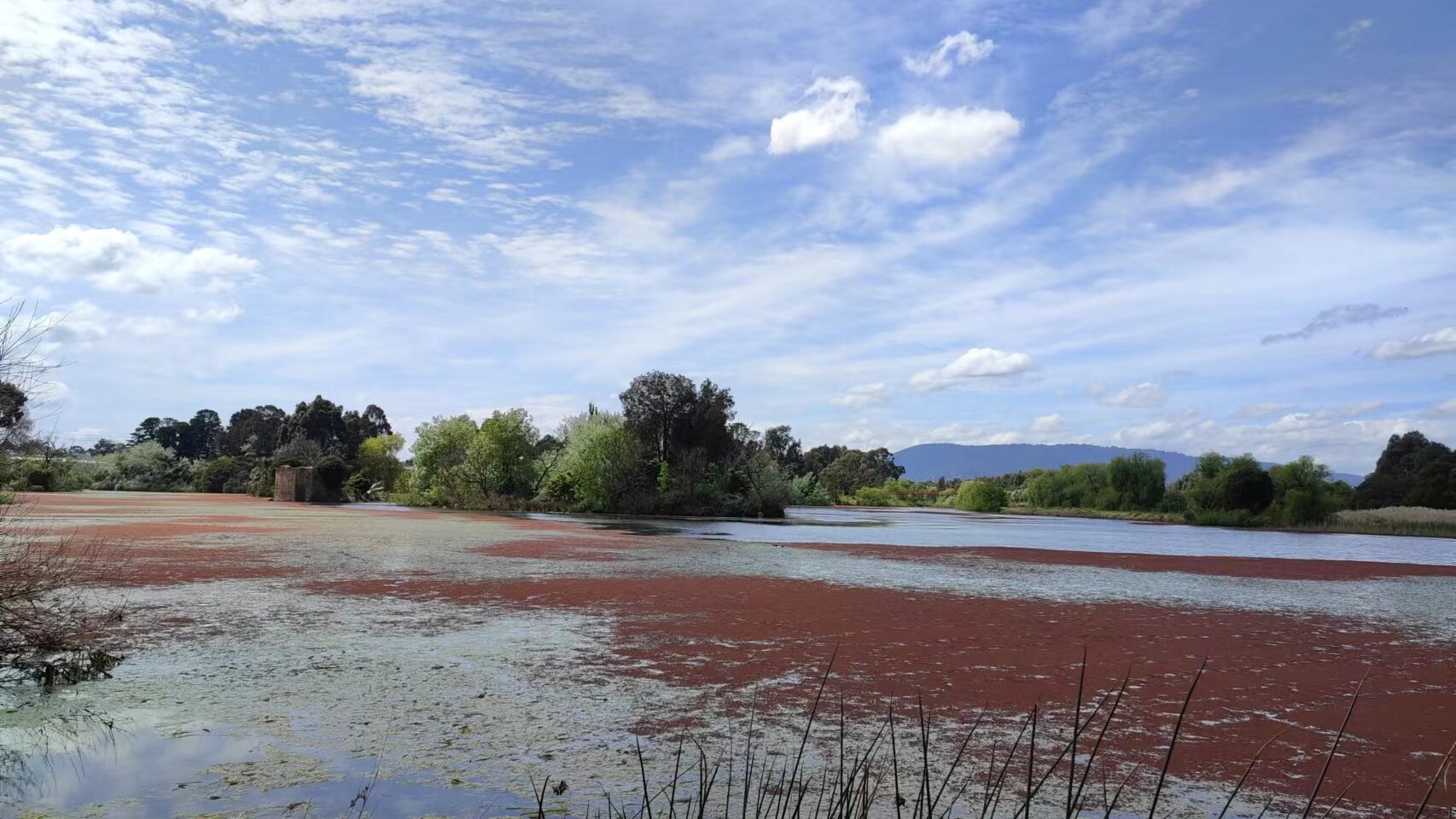
The islets in the central portion of Caribbean Lake, where boat tours of the Caribbean Gardens were held

Caribbean Gardens was a 100-acre (40 ha) market, gardens and amusement park located in the outer eastern suburb of Scoresby in Melbourne, Australia, on the north/west side of Caribbean Lake, a large 1.2 km (0.75 mi)-long artificial lake along the northern (right) bank of Corhanwarrabul Creek, a major tributary of Dandenong Creek.

Caribbean Gardens and Market operated from 1965 when it started with water ski shows and a handful of traders selling wares from their car boots. What once was "a handful of traders" grew into a bustling undercover market with over 1000 stall sites. It was known as one of the largest markets in Victoria, occupying a 10,500 m^{2} (2.6-acre) pavilion.

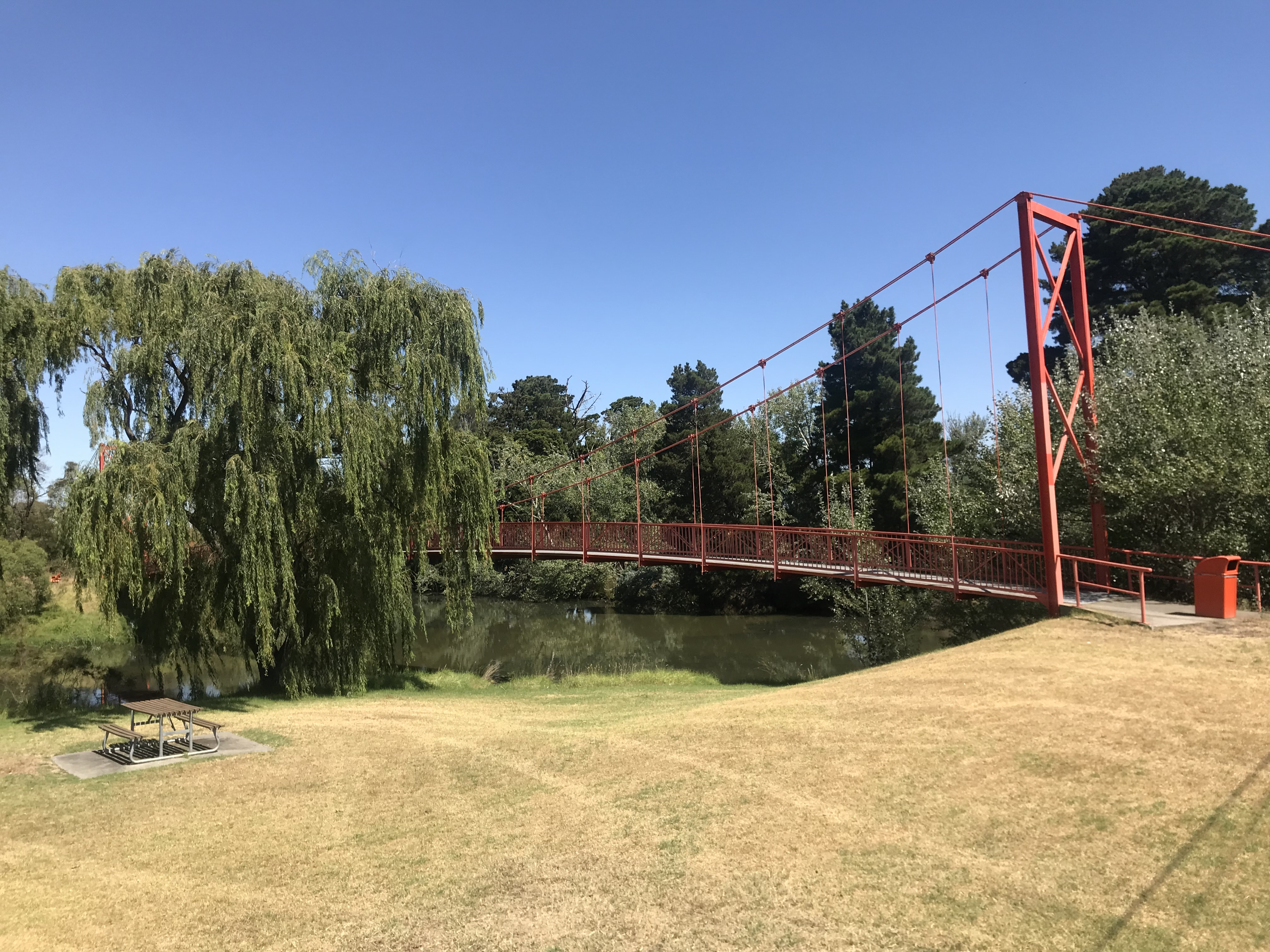
Caribbean Gardens Scoresby, Picnic Area

== History ==
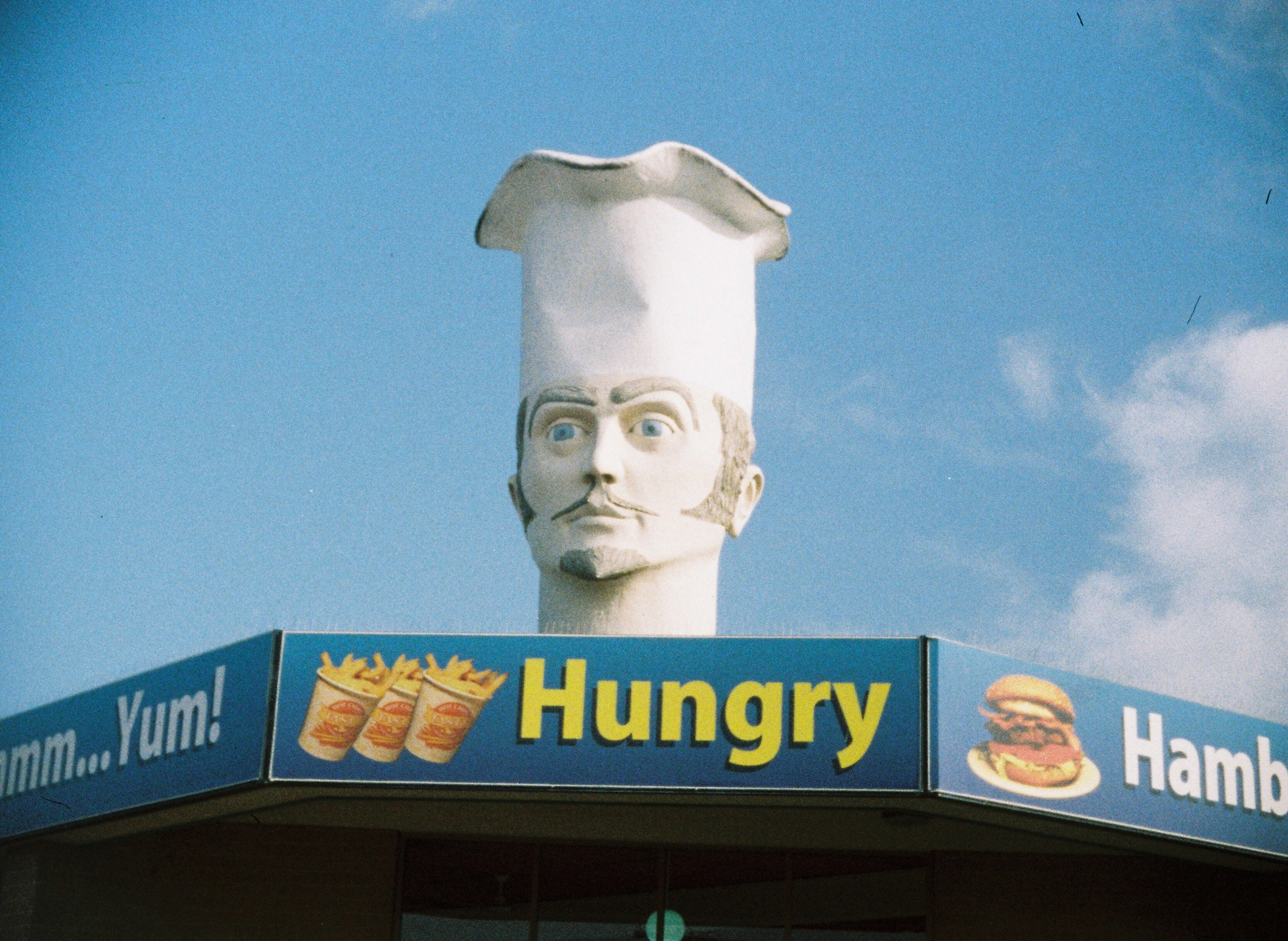
A sculpture of a chef's head in Caribbean Gardens

In 1945, the Spooner family acquired around 300 acres (1.2 km^{2}) of land in Scoresby. In 1958, whilst overseas, Arch Spooner became interested in fibreglass and realised the potential of the material for the boatbuilding industry, and established the Caribbean Boat Factory. It soon became necessary to have a waterbody large enough for testing the boats and, in the early 1960s, the artificial Lake Caribbean was constructed.

It was subsequently opened to the public and further developed by one of his sons, Rod Spooner, as Caribbean Gardens in 1965. Caribbean Garden's waterski shows attracted many crowds to the gardens. The much-loved Caribbean Market opened in 1976 and, in the 1980s, the next generation of the Spooner family began developing part of the remaining land into a technology and office park that blended into the surrounding environment.

The Spooner family subsequently announced plans to expand and transform the mostly defunct market into a business park that would "become the largest office precinct outside of the CBD". In 2014, The comprehensive masterplan of the new "Caribbean Park" involved new office buildings, expansive lakeside parklands, integrated landscaping, new retail areas, lifestyle facilities, and a Hyatt Place hotel, with the aim of adding a minimum of 10,000 new trees within the parklands every year.

== Features and significance ==
The site was significant for being Victoria's "first local example" of a theme park, with many original features, such as Japanese gardens, a railway, chairlift, jungle cruise and picnic areas including unique fibreglass umbrellas and whimsical architecture. It was also home to larger fibreglass statues including a giant pirate and a big chef head built in the 1970s that resided on top of the Caribbean Gardens Restaurant.

The Women's Weekly noted in 1966 that the Spooner family "aims to turn the area into a kind of local Disneyland, and already the shores and many islets at one end of the lake are dotted with fibreglass crocodiles, elephants, hippopotamuses". The park also included "ski kite-riding from the Cypress Gardens" in the US.

The chairlift ride was built by Jack Griffiths and chairlift manufacturer Ron McCallum, and was originally in Whistlestop Amusement Park, in Skye Road, Frankston, which had closed in 1974.

Caribbean Gardens also had a preserved sugarcane railway locomotive, built in 1924, from the Victoria Mill, Ingham, Queensland. Other features included cast iron street lamps, originally used in central Melbourne, dotted around the gardens.

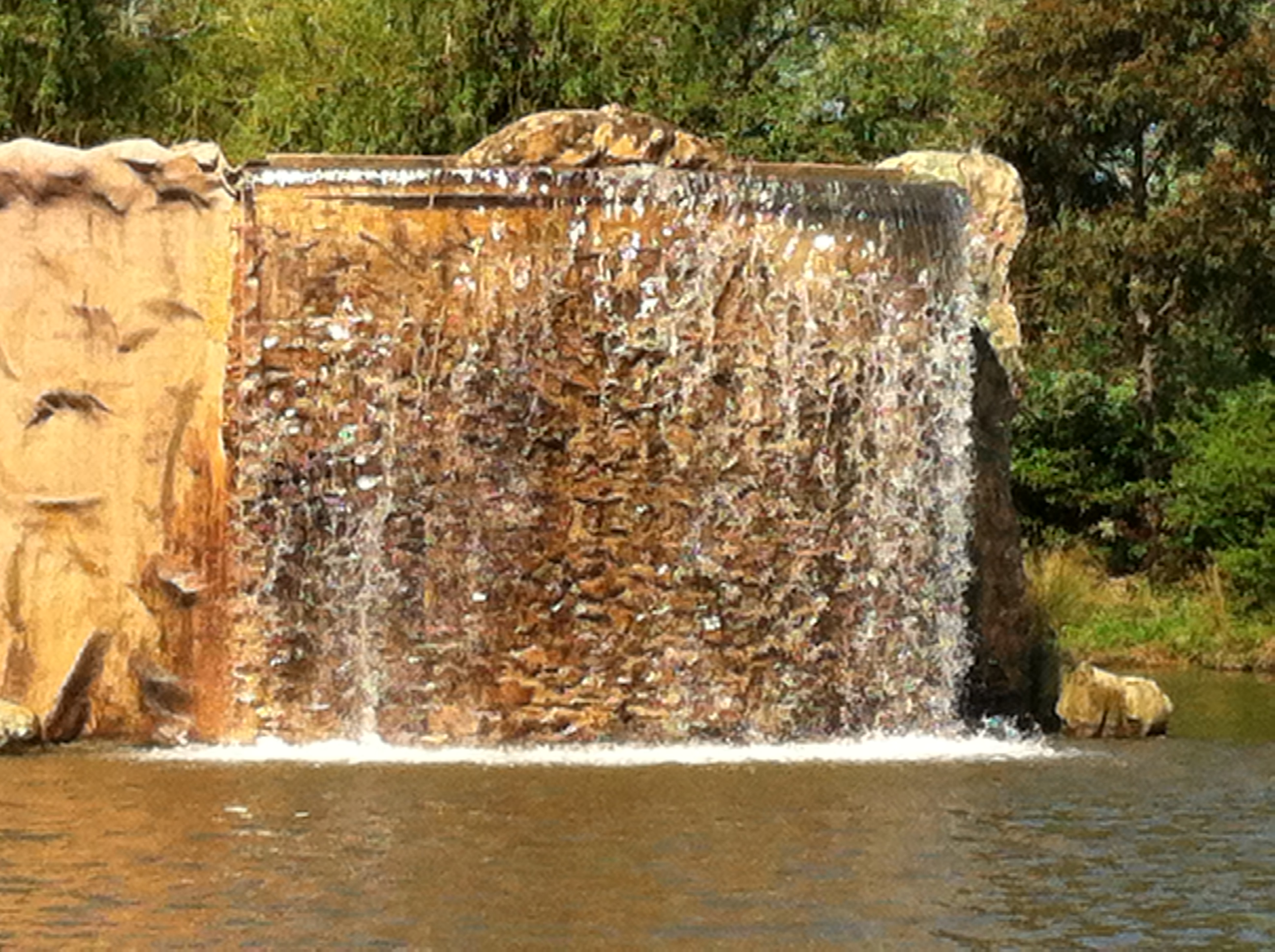
Caribbean Gardens (also known as Caribbean Park) former Jungle Cruise ride waterfall from amusement park.

== Closure in 2020 ==
On 1 July 2020, it was announced that the park would close permanently, after COVID-19 lockdowns forced a temporary closure which greatly affected the park financially. Despite the closure, Caribbean Market supporters called for the "institution" to be saved. After the official announcement, the Caribbean Market Facebook page attracted over 5000 comments in support.

From 2021-2025, many of the original Caribbean Gardens attractions had been sold or demolished including the chairlift and the train ride tracks. Many of the iconic picnic umbrellas made of fibreglass still remain and add to the character of the original gardens. The site continues to be used for mixed use being hired for events and music festivals through Event Central.

Today the site of Caribbean Gardens sits within Caribbean Park, Australia's largest privately owned business parkland still owned and operated by the Spooner Family. The site is fondly remembered as a Melbourne icon.

== See also ==
- Parks and gardens of Melbourne
- Lakes and reservoirs of Melbourne
