= Footscray Park =

Park in Footscray, Melbourne, Victoria, Australia

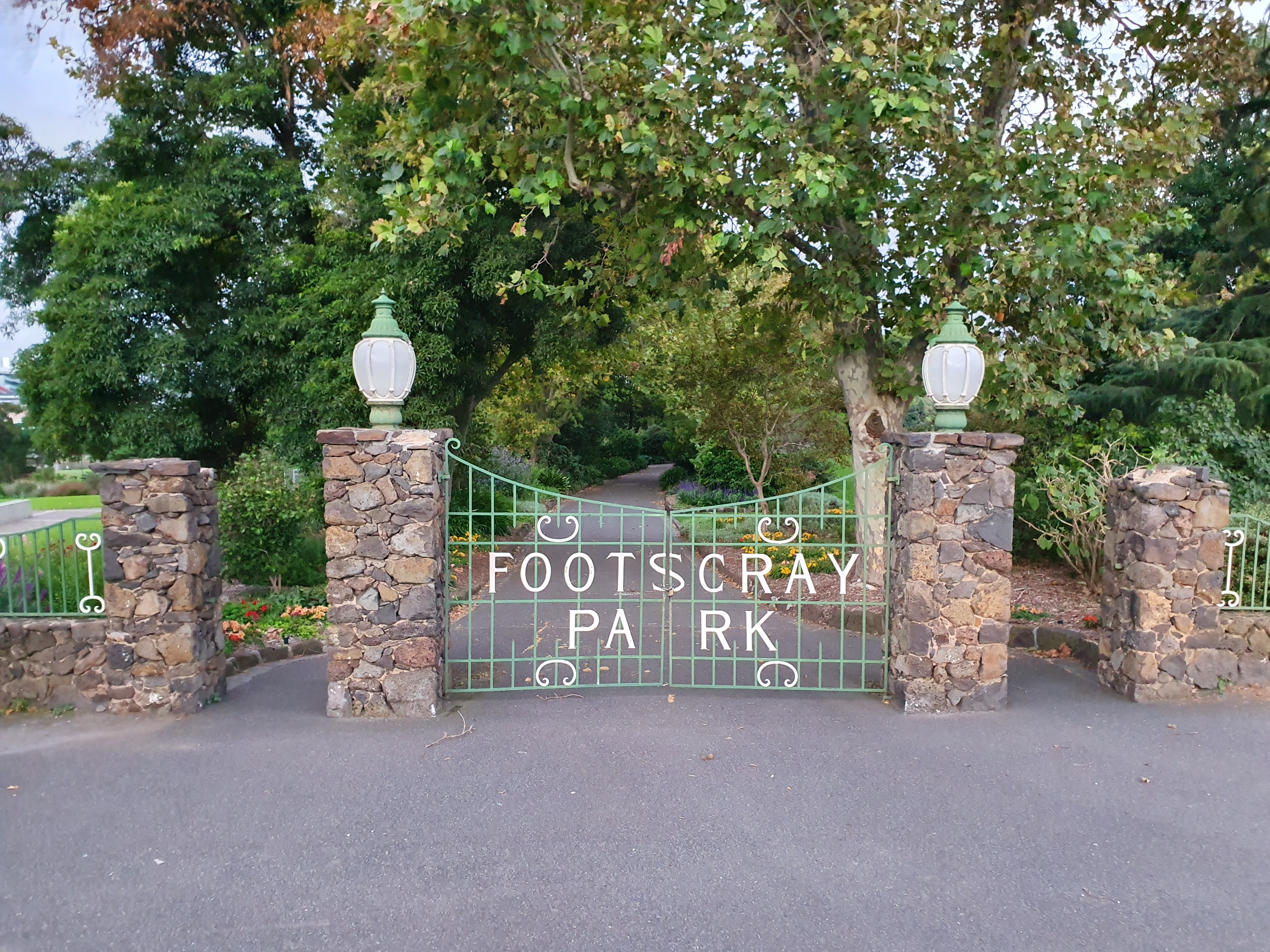
- Main entrance gate, 2020

- Location within Melbourne
- Interactive map of Footscray Park
- Type: Urban park
- Location: Footscray, Melbourne, Victoria, Australia
- Coordinates: 37°47′39″S 144°54′16″E
- Area: 15 ha (37 acres)
- Opened: 1911; 115 years ago
- Designer: Rodney Alsop
- Operator: Maribyrnong City Council; Parks Victoria
- Status: Open
- Water: Maribyrnong River
- Public transit: – Flemington Racecourse; –; – 216, 220, 402, 406, 409; – Maribyrnong River Trail
- Landmarks: Thomson Water Gardens; Rowing club and jetty; various memorials and statues
- Facilities: Barbecues; cricket nets; drinking fountain; memorial gardens; outdoor stage/amphitheatre; picnic facilities and shelters; playground; tennis courts; toilets
- Website: maribyrnong.vic.gov.au

Victorian Heritage Register
- Official name: Footscray Park
- Type: Registered place
- Designated: 21 November 1996
- Reference no.: H1220
- Heritage overlay no.: HO20
- Categories: Monuments and Memorials; Parks, Gardens and Trees
- Architectural style: Edwardian

Register of the National Estate
- Official name: Footscray Park
- Type: Defunct register
- Designated: undated
- Reference no.: 100531

Footscray Park is a 15-hectare (37-acre) urban park located on the south bank of the Maribyrnong River in Footscray, Melbourne, in Victoria, Australia. The park is one of the largest and most intact examples of an Edwardian park in Australia.

The park was added to the Victorian Heritage Register on 21 November 1996 for its aesthetic, horticultural and social significance, noted for its botanical collection, ornamental ponds and garden structures, and was the first gardens to be placed on the register. The park was also added to the non-statutory and now defunct Register of the National Estate on an unknown date.

Located on the traditional lands of the Wurundjeri Woi Wurrung and the Bunurong people, the park is managed by the City of Maribyrnong; with the river-edge of the park managed by Parks Victoria.

== History ==
The park was established following lobbying by local citizens to establish parkland on the site. The original layout of the park was designed by architect Rodney Alsop, who won a design competition for the park in 1911. The Footscray Park Beautification Committee was formed by the residents and supported by local businesses and individuals. Much of the work was carried out by volunteers, including local Boy Scouts. By 1914 the park already had a large collection of Australian native species, predominantly Eucalyptus and Acacias. Many of the gardens structures including arbours, bridges and ponds were constructed by unemployed Victorians during the Depression. The majority of the layout and installation of features was carried out under the direction of David Mathews who was Superintendent of Parks and Gardens for the City of Footscray between 1916 and 1964. William Nicholls, an orchid specialist, also assisted in the task.

The slopes of the park were a vantage point for a crowd of 40,000 to see Bert Hinkler land his plane at Flemington Racecourse in 1928 as part of an Australian tour following his successful completion of the first solo flight from England to Australia.

Equipped with an outdoor stage/amphitheatre, the park has been the venue for two large Melbourne events - The Saltwater Festival and the Vietnamese Festival. Since 2012, the park holds annual New Year's Eve firework displays and celebrations on the banks of the Maribyrnong River, the second largest New Year's Eve event in Melbourne behind celebrations in the Melbourne city centre.

The 'heavily indebted' local Council approved a $1.8 million makeover for the park in March 2011. In 2019, Council failed to privatise one third of the park.

== Description ==
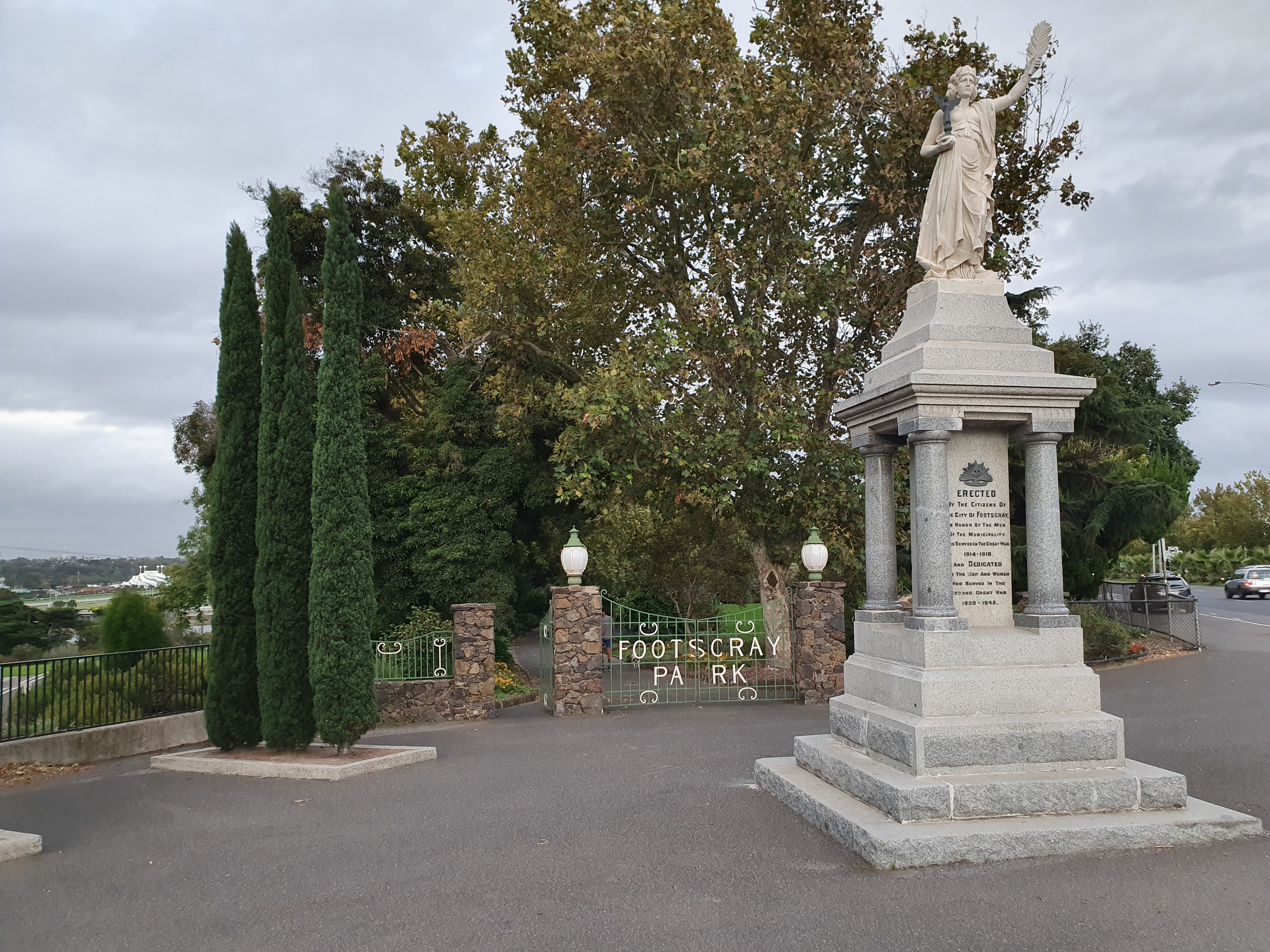
Victory statue, 2020

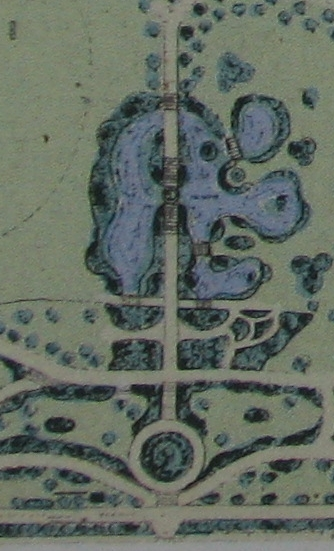
Detail from original plan

The entrance to the park on Ballarat Road features stone walls and wrought iron gates which incorporate the wording "Footscray Park". A World War I memorial was unveiled in 1922 stands at the entranceway. It features an Italian-sculpted 6-metre-high (20 ft) marble statue of Victory on a granite base. A dedication in honour of those who served in World War II was subsequently installed.

A rustic stone columned lookout shelter and pergola which was designed and built by students from Footscray Technical School in 1928 has a view toward the Maribyrnong River and Flemington Racecourse. Nearby a mounted bust of Henry Lawson by Stanley Hammond, dedicated in 1960, honours the Australian poet and writer and the inaugural Henry Lawson Literary Society commemorative event held in the park.

The park has two (originally three) major paths running east–west along the embankment which are bisected by a north–south path (the T.B. Drew Memorial Walk) which descends the embankment through a wisteria-covered arbour to Thomson Water Garden. The Alfred Green Memorial Fountain (locally known as the "platypus fountain") is an unusual granite fountain that is supported at its base by two sculpted platypuses. The park also has open playing fields on the flat area near the river.

=== Trees ===
The park has a diverse collection of mature trees, including palms, elms, ash, oaks, cypress, various Australian species as well as a number of species which are rare in cultivation in Australia. The following trees are cited in its heritage listing:

- Brahea armata (Blue Hesper Palm)
- Clerodendrum glabrum (2 trees)
- Cupressus macrocarpa 'Hodginsii'
- Ficus microcarpa var. hillii (Hill's Fig)
- Melaleuca halmaturorum
- Quercus aff. stellata
- Vitex agnus-castus
- Ulmus glabra 'Exoniensis' (Exeter Elm)

== See also ==
- Parks and gardens of Melbourne
- Heritage gardens in Australia
- List of places on the Victorian Heritage Register in the City of Maribyrnong
