= Karkarook Park =

Urban park in Melbourne, Australia

- Interactive map of Karkarook Park
- Type: Metropolitan park
- Location: Heatherton, Victoria, Australia
- Coordinates: 37.9419°S 145.0833°E
- Area: 15 hectares (37 acres)
- Manager: Parks Victoria
- Terrain: Wetland reserve

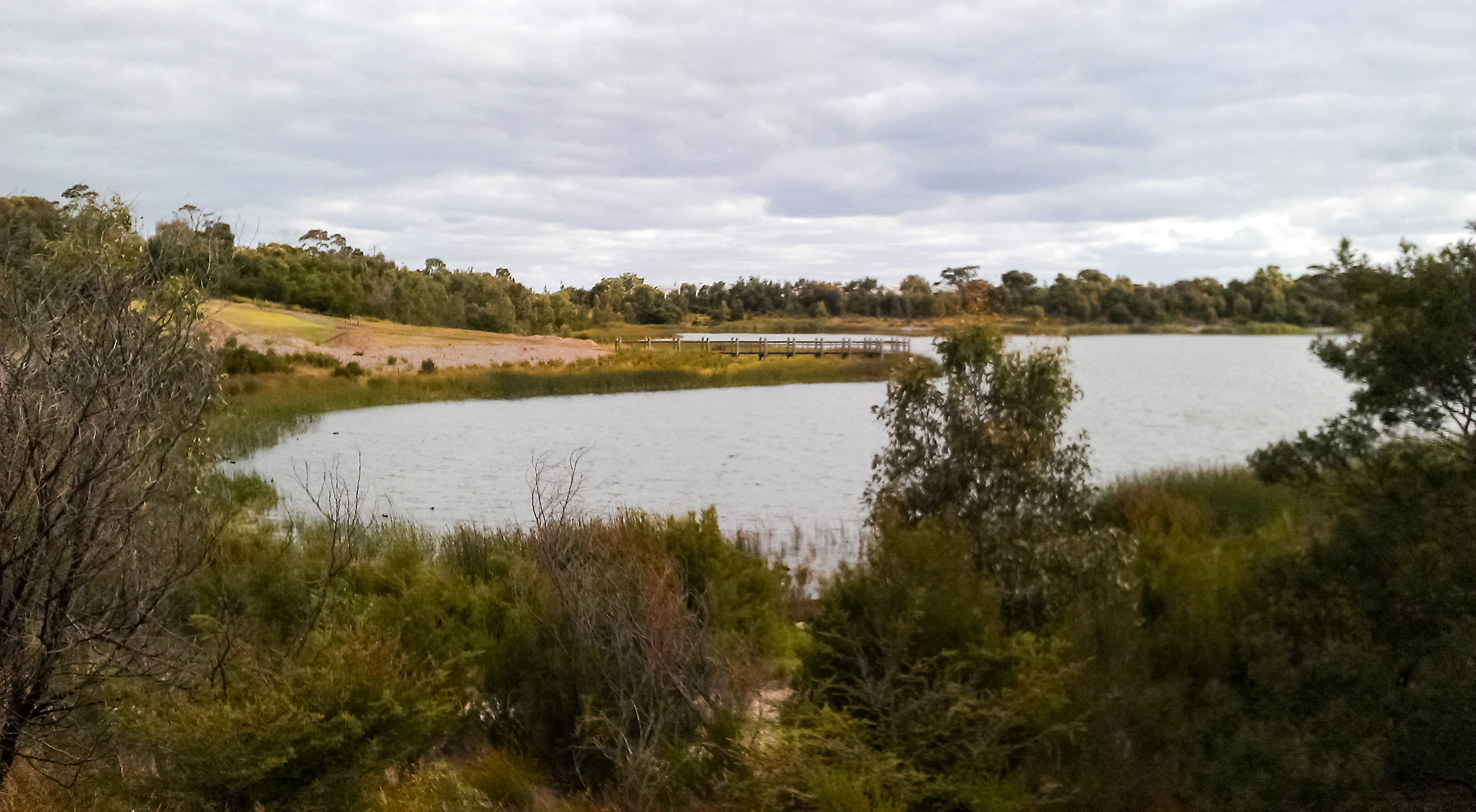
Karkarook Park jetty, viewing from the northeastern corner of the lake

Karkarook Park is a metropolitan park in Melbourne, Victoria, Australia, located at the northwest corner of the southeastern suburb of Heatherton (formerly under Moorabbin), southeast of the intersection between Warrigal Road and Dingley Bypass, accessible to cars only via Fairchild Street on the south side. The park is a wetland reserve built around the Karkarook Lake, a 15 hectares (37 acres), 420 m (1,380 ft) wide artificial lake built from a pit created by sand mining between 1997 and 2001, filled in 2004 by groundwater pumped from a bore 500 metres (550 yd) to the southeast.

== History ==
Karkarook Park is built on the traditional lands of the Bunurong people, and Parks Victoria officially acknowledges the Aboriginal Traditional Owners of Victoria — including its parks and reserves. The name "Karkarook" means "sandy place" in the Aboriginal Kulin languages.

Prior to the sand removal, Karkarook Park and adjacent areas were largely used as a stormwater retarding basin and for market gardens and horse agistment, and much of this was weed-infested and strewn with rubbish. Sand extraction was completed in 2001, and the first stages of rehabilitation were completed with the creation of woodlands, swamp/marshland and ponds, walking trails, picnic areas, public toilets, a playground, access roads and car parking. The main lake was completed and filled in 2004, and the entire water body systems have been surrounded by open space, new vegetation, a paved foot/bike path system for hikers and cyclists, as well as new picnic facilities and an observation deck, all to be ultimately linked with other parks and amenities in the region.

Most of the original indigenous flora where the current park is had been cleared since European settlement, and the few remnants provide the only vegetation cover within the park. A revegetation program began in 1995 with the assistance of local primary schools, but many of the seedlings were destroyed by a grass fire in January 1997. Since then revegetation works have increased and an annual revegetation program is now in place.

In 2011, the Victorian Government released plans for Karkarook Park to be joined up with nearby parks in the southeast green wedge to form a "chain of parks". Parks in the southeast to be connected include Braeside Park.

== Park characteristics ==
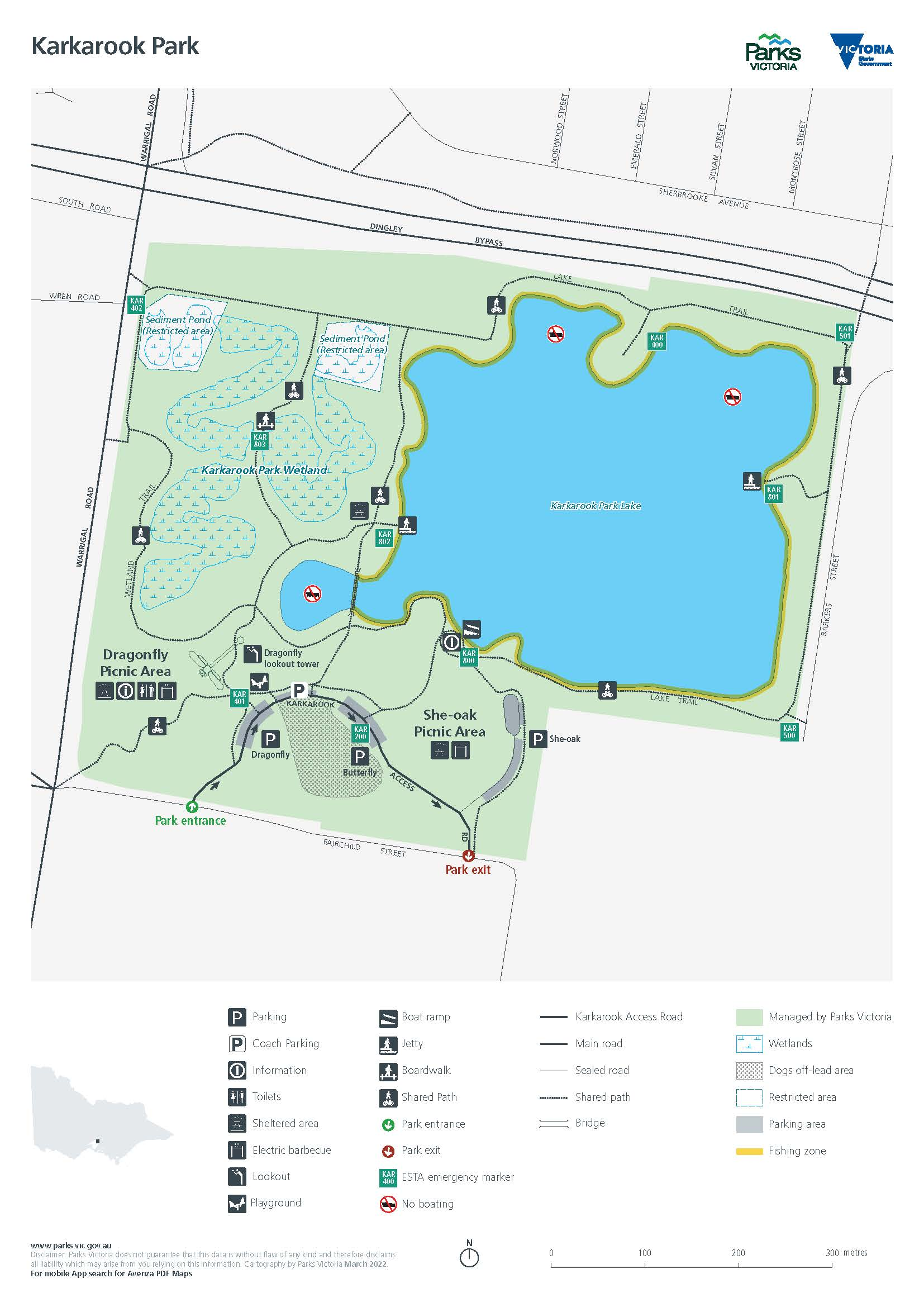
Cartography map of Karkarook Park by Parks Victoria, as of March 2022

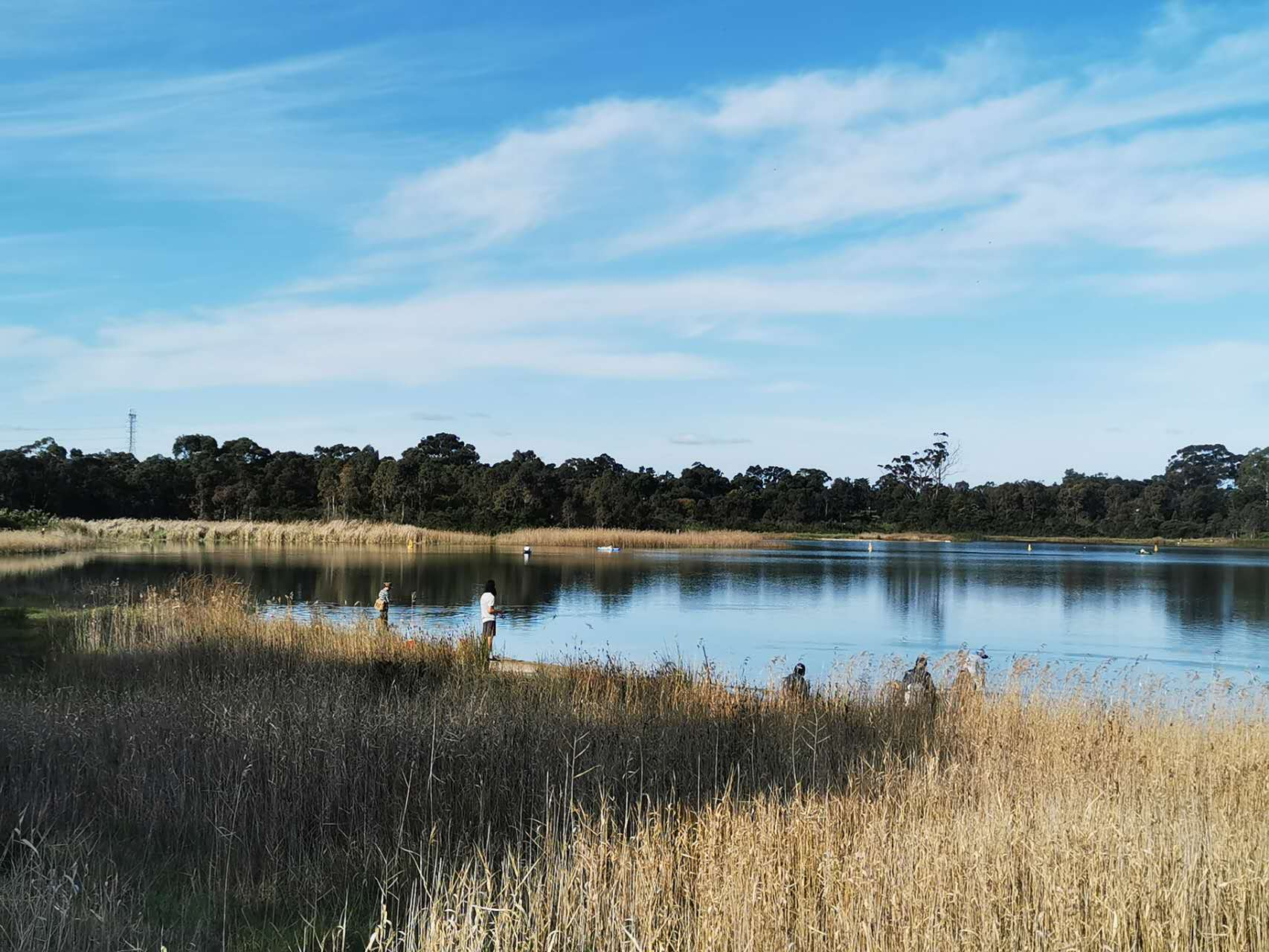
Karkarook Lake's northwestern shoreline, with buoys marking the no-boating zones

The key functions of the Karkarook Park, especially its lake and wetland systems, include:

- Flood retardation;
- Provision of a recreational amenity; and
- Improvement of local environmental values.

Karkarook Park's main lake has a water body area of 14.9832 ha (37 acres) and a perimeter of 2,068 m (2,262 yd), with a width varying between 390–420 m (1,280–1,380 ft). The lowest level in the lake floor is RL 31.5 m (103 ft) AHD, with the water level at RL 39.5 m (130 ft) AHD, resulting in a deepest water depth of 8.0 m (26.2 ft). The lake water volume (with the water level at RL 39.5m AHD) is 690,000 m^{3} (900,000 cu yd). The lake water level is to be maintained through stormwater runoff from surrounding lake batters and incident rainfall on the lake surface, as well as groundwater seepage and bore extraction from the Silurian aquifer. A valve allows the lake water level to be controlled over a 0.9 m (2 ft 11 in) depth range, as the water level needs to be maintained within a variation 300 mm (12 in) above and below the designed lake water level of RL 39.5m AHD to ensure the survival of aquatic plant species. The lake is endorheic and water can only leave the lake by evaporation or by overflooding out into the surrounding woodlands.

There are two serpentine retention basins west of the lake serving as extended wetlands, linked by a short marsh channel that is traversable via a short straight boardwalk. These ponds receive and improve the water quality of the runoffs drained from Oakleigh South across Dingley Bypass in the north, and from Moorabbin across Warrigal Road in the west, by retaining and filtering through the wetland vegetations. In case of severe inflow (though very rare), the excess water may flood east over a low-lying lawn and trail southeast of the ponds (which serve the function of a mechanical weir) and drain into the main lake via a small enclosed bay at the lake's southwestern corner (unofficially known as "the inlet"), where a wooden trestle bridge crosses over the narrowest part of the grassy channel.

For flood management, the basin system is to have two components: the wetland area with a maximum storage volume of 175,980 m^{3} (230,170 cu yd) at 40.9 m (134 ft) AHD and a capacity for a 10-year-ARI flood event alone, and the lake area receiving over-spill from the wetlands with a total maximum storage volume of 433,090 m^{3} (566,460 cu yd) at 40.98 m (134.4 ft) AHD for flood events greater than 10 years and up to 100-year-ARI.

Aquatic plants are located within the lake edge, ephemeral marsh zones, shallow marsh zones, deep marsh zones and submergent marsh zones around the lake. When plant denudation (due to dry seasons or excessive foraging by water birds) occurs, infill planting is undertaken using plants from other areas. Aquatic plants are further protected during regrowth or replanting periods through the use of protective bird netting.

== Fauna ==
Since the development of the wetlands in 1998, over 90 species of native waterfowls have been recorded in the park, including ducks, coots, moorhens, black swans and cormorants. Additionally, more than 145 species of native birds in general have also been observed, with revegetation measures expected to improve habitats values and increase the fauna population.

There are visible snake warning signs all over the Lake Trail, as the high reeds of the wetlands also serve as a habitat for nesting waterbirds and frogs, which are preys to snakes.

The main lake is stocked with several freshwater fish species including rainbow trout, redfin perch, estuary perch, freshwater eel and common carp, as well as native sport fishes such as Murray cod, Australian bass, golden perch and silver perch in recent years.

== Recreation ==
Karkarook Park is described as "a recreational and environmental oasis" and "the perfect spot to connect with nature" by Parks Victoria. The park has a 6 km (3.7 mi) network of trails and bike paths all the way around the lake and the wetland ponds. The main picnic area has electric barbecue grills provided free of charge, as well as a playground, public toilets and a small observation deck that looks over the lake. There are three public carparks (namely "Dragonfly", "Butterfly" and "She-oak") located near the lake. Dog walkers can wander freely throughout the park, but they must ensure that their dogs remain on a leash except in the designated off-leash area within the park.

Birdwatchers can spend time spying different species in amongst the bushland of the Wetlands Trail, but feeding the birds or other animals are discouraged as this can create dependency and may interfere with the animals' natural foraging behaviours.

The Karkarook Lake has a small boat ramp for boating activities such as rowing, canoeing, kayaking, sailing and paddleboarding, but swimming, underwater diving and windsurfing is not permitted in the lake. There are buoys in the lake marking three no-boating zones, namely the two bays along the northern shore, where the water margins are preserved for wildlife habitats; and the southwestern inlet, where the closely aligned bridge trestles restrict any safe boat passage from the lake.

Flying drones is not allowed without a permit, and no power boats, jet skis or motorised model boats are allowed on the lake, but non-powered model boats are permitted.

Recreational fishing is permitted in on most of the sandy/rocky beaches and on designated zones on the grassy shores, particularly the inlet mouth (outside of the trestle bridge), the eastern flats and the northeastern bay. The park is one of the most popular urban trout fishing locations in Victoria, and the Victorian Fisheries Authority (VFA), the state's chief licensing agency for all fishing activities, regularly restocks hatchery-raised game fishes (particularly rainbow trout) prior to school holidays to promote the Victoria Government's $35 million "Go Fishing Victoria" initiative. There are a small pier at the western bank and another larger pier on a jetty along the eastern lake trail, as well as numerous fishermen's trails leading to the water edge for bank fishing. Kayak and SUP fishing can also be conducted within the boating zone of the lake.

== See also ==
- Parks and gardens of Melbourne
- Lakes and reservoirs of Melbourne
