= Henry Barratt =

English rugby union player

- Born: Henry Barratt; 28 April 1983 (age 43) Oxford, Oxfordshire, England
- Height: 1.85 m (6 ft 1 in)
- Weight: 90 kg (14 st 2 lb)
- University: Royal Holloway University of London – Business Management
- Occupation: Personal trainer

Rugby union career
- Position: Centre
Senior career
Years	Team	Apps	(Points)
2003–2006	Harlequins		
2006–2007	Cornish Pirates		
2008 –	London Wasps		

Henry Barratt (born 28 April 1983 in Oxford, Oxfordshire) is an English former professional rugby union player for the Harlequin FC and London Wasps in the Guinness Premiership and the Cornish Pirates and England U21 team playing in two U21 Worlds cups in England, Oxford in 2002/03 and Edinburgh, Scotland in 2003/04. He played as a centre and wing in rugby union.

Barratt is a personal trainer and rehabilitation coach, having founded ONE: Personal Training in Mayfair in 2022.
