= Bethany Barratt =

American political scientist and author (1972–2026)

Bethany A. Barratt (August 18, 1972 – September 28, 2026) was an American political scientist and author. She wrote and researched about human rights and their effects on foreign policy. Barratt was a professor of Political Science at Roosevelt University in Chicago, Illinois, and the director of its Joseph Loundy Human Rights Project, which engages undergraduates in comparative cross-national research on a variety of human rights challenges, especially as they occur in urban settings..

== Early life and career ==
Bethany A. Barratt was born in Beirut, Lebanon, on August 18, 1972. She was the author of Human Rights and Foreign Aid: For Love or Money? (2007, Routledge), Public Opinion and International Intervention: Lessons from the Iraq War (coedited with Peter Furia and Richard Sobel (2011, Potomac), The Politics of Harry Potter, (2011, Palgrave), and Human Rights in The Post-9/11 World: A Sourcebook,(2013, Open Society Foundation), as well as articles in several peer-reviewed journals.

In 2011, Barratt was the co-organizer of a photographic exhibit at Roosevelt University entitled "The Innocents: Headshots", highlighting 45 cases of wrongful convictions. Barratt was the director of the Joseph Loundy Human Rights Project.

== Death ==
Barratt died on September 28, 2026, at the age of 54.
