= Enoch Barratt =

Australian nurseryman

- Born: Enoch Pearson Barratt; 1812; Buckingham, England
- Died: 14 December 1895 (aged 82–83); Perth, Western Australia
- Occupations: Gardener, nurseryman
- Known for: Wellington Nursery

Enoch Pearson Barratt, and sometimes Barrett, (1812 – 14 December 1895) was an Australian nursery proprietor who established one of the earliest commercial nurseries in Western Australia.

== Biography ==
Barratt was born in Buckingham, England. In 1838, at the age of 26 he married Mary Ann Fleming. They had three children: Elizabeth Mary (b. Newport Pagnell, 4 December 1839), James Enoch (b. Deptford, 8 October 1845) and Emma Matilda (b. Deptford, 23 December 1848).

In 1846 Barratt was employed as a switch turner for London, Brighton and South Coast Railway at Deptford. In 1851 he and his brother George were charged with stealing various items from his employer, and with receiving stolen goods. On 12 May 1851 he was convicted of stealing and sentenced to ten years transportation. He was imprisoned in Newgate Prison in London, where he remained until 30 April 1852 where he departed from Plymouth on the ship William Jardine. He arrived in the Colony of Western Australia on 1 August 1852 and brought with him gardening skills, which he put to use in the employ of colonists John Gregory and, after his pardon in 1853, George Shenton Sr. His wife and three children followed him out to Western Australia, arriving on 23 March 1854 on board the ship Victory. They had a fourth child, Federick Pearson (b. Perth, 28 December 1856). In 1858 he received a full pardon.

In 1860, he established the Wellington Nursery at his Murray Street residence, which bordered the wetlands near Lake Kingsford, north of Perth. These wetland fringes were utilised for market gardens and were ideal for growing horticultural crops and nursery stock. In 1868 he successfully applied for the position of Government Gardener to tend Government Gardens (now known as Stirling Gardens), which he held until he retired in 1880. On 11 February 1877 his wife died; later that year he married Maria Church (a widow) on 25 October at the Trinity Congregational Church on St Georges Terrace.

The nursery's first advertised plants included Melia azedarach (white cedar), and by 1870 its stock included grapevines and fruit trees. By 1874, the nursery stocked the Western Australian native Callitris preissii and other ornamental trees. Seeds followed in 1878 and then shrubs and roses in 1884. The nursery exported its own seeds and was an agent for William Shepherd's Darling Nursery in Sydney and Suttons Seeds in England. The nursery relocated to Douro Street (which was later renamed as an extension of Wellington Street) in 1876, and retail premises were opened in Hay Street in 1895. Barratt died on 14 December 1895 at the age of eighty-three and is buried at the East Perth Cemetery.

His son, James Enoch (1845 - 1906) entered the business in 1880. Upon James' retirement, the business passed to his three sons, Edward James (1871 - 1937), Albert William (1872 - 1952) and (Frederick) Walter (1878 - 1948), who continued the commercial operations until 1904, when the nursery site was sold.

== See also ==
- Shafto Lane
