= Martine Barrat =

French photographer, actress, dancer, and writer (born 1932/1933)

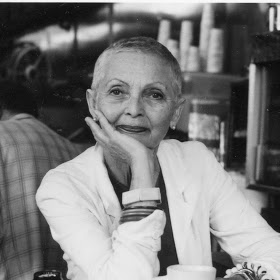
- Born: 1932 or 1933 (age 93–94); Oran, Algeria
- Occupations: Photographer, video and filmmaker
- Known for: Do or Die

Martine Barrat (French: [maʁtin baʁa]; born 1932 or 1933) is a French photographer, actress, dancer, and writer.

== Early life ==
Barrat was born in Oran, Algeria, but raised in France.

Formerly a dancer and actress, Martine Barrat was discovered by Ellen Stewart at an international dance festival in Edinburgh, Scotland. "LaMaMa", as Stewart was known, then sent her a plane ticket to perform in her theater, La MaMa Experimental Theatre Club on the Lower East Side of Manhattan. Barrat arrived in the United States in June 1968.

== Career ==
In the late 1960s, Barrat was invited by the dancer Ellen Stewart to New York to work on Stewart's La MaMa Experimental Theatre Club. Barrat traveled to Harlem to bring children to participate in the music and video workshops, beginning a lifelong dedication to the neighborhood. Stewart gave the group a building, and they began video workshops for the youth of the neighborhood. She would also collaborate with the Human Arts Ensemble.

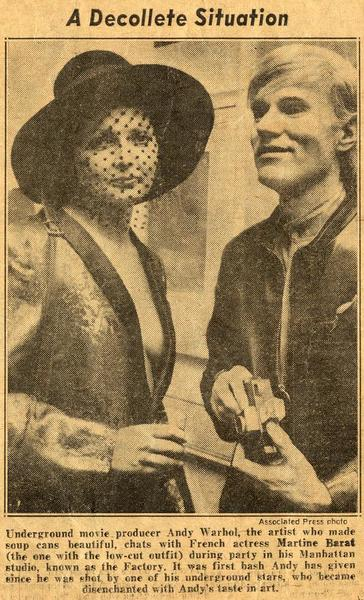
Barrat with Andy Warhol at the Factory in New York, 1968

Around 1971, Barrat started to work with video in the South Bronx with two gangs: the Roman Kings and the Roman Queens, as well as the president of the Ghetto Brothers. She spent all of her time for years working with the members and sharing the video equipment, creating a series of videos between 1971 and 1976. The series, called You Do The Crime, You Do The Time, debuted at Columbia and at the French embassy in a show organized by Félix Guattari and Gilles Deleuze, through their organization CERFI. In 1978, Barrat was awarded the prize of Best Documentary Filmmaker in Milan, Italy for the film. In Italy, Channel 2 aired the film several times at prime time. In America, earlier that same year, excerpts were aired on NBC. The Whitney Museum in New York also showed the film along with Barrat's first photography of the South Bronx, which was well-attended and well-regarded by the press.

In the following years, she immersed herself in photographing the boxing world in New York, from young boys training in Harlem, Bed-Stuy, Brooklyn, to the Bronx. The resulting work was displayed at the consulate general of France in New York, with the book titled Do or Die. In 1993, the photographs were collected in the book Do or Die, published by Viking Penguin and prefaced by Gordon Parks and Martin Scorsese: "Patiently, painfully and with a highly discerning heart, Martine Barrat has filled our eyes with a world of young warriors eager to earn the honors of their hostile sport. ... A wistful, beauteous demeanor betrays the hardness that is already building in their hearts. ... with powerful pictures and strong words, Martine Barrat captures the spirit of young fighters who, with the other guy's blood on their gloves, return joyously to their concerns."

In 2007, Barratʼs work was featured in the acclaimed Harlem In My Heart, a major retrospective at La Maison Européenne de la Photographie in Paris. The show featured 190 photographs and her most recent video work and was reviewed and featured in over fifty international newspapers, magazines and radio shows. The French newspaper Libération remarked that Harlem In My Heart is not a monument to the glory of American blacks, but a collection of moments in their company, a rare intensity...it is almost impossible not to cry, the emotion is palpable." The photos of Harlem in My Heart were titled by David Murray, composer and jazz musician, for the show. Her involvement with the jazz scene in New York City has resulted in textual collaborations with jazz musicians, such as Ornette Coleman, who has given many titles to her photographs and written companion texts, and who curated a show including her work.

Martine Barrat: Soul of the City, exhibited in 2024 at Galerie Rouge in Paris, featured Barrat's photographs from the 1970s through the 1990s. In 2026, the exhibit was on view as part of Arles Recontres de la Photographie, curated by Agathe Cancellieri.

== Collections ==
- Brooklyn Museum
- Bibliothèque Nationale de France
- Lincoln Center Library
- Museum of the City of New York
- Museum of Modern Art, New York
- Schomburg Center for Research in Black Culture
- Smithsonian American Art Museum
- Whitney Museum

== Literature ==
- Barrat, Martine (1993). Do or die. Viking. ISBN 978-0-670-84325-1.
