= Alf Barratt =

English footballer

Personal information
- Full name: Alfred George Barratt
- Date of birth: 13 April 1920
- Place of birth: Kettering, England
- Date of death: 2002 (aged 81–82)
- Height: 6 ft 0 in (1.83 m)
- Position: Defender

Senior career*
Years	Team	Apps	(Gls)
1936–1937	Weldon		
1937–1938	Kettering Town		
1938–1939	Northampton Town	1	(0)
1939–1946	Stewart & Lloyds		
1946–1950	Leicester City	4	(0)
1950–1951	Grimsby Town	23	(0)
1951–1956	Southport	198	(0)
- * Club domestic league appearances and goals

Alfred George Barratt (13 April 1920 – 2002) was an English professional footballer who played as a defender.
