= Roy Barratt =

English former cricketer

Personal information
- Full name: Roy James Barratt
- Born: 3 May 1942; Aylestone, Leicester
- Died: 19 January 1995 (aged 52); Coalville, Leicestershire
- Nickname: Basher
- Batting: Left-handed
- Bowling: Slow left-arm orthodox
- Role: Bowler

Domestic team information
- Years: Team
- 1961–1970: Leicestershire

Career statistics
Competition	First-class	LA
Matches	70	5
Runs scored	604	2
Batting average	8.38	1.00
100s/50s	0/0	0/0
Top score	39	1*
Balls bowled	9,225	132
Wickets	141	3
Bowling average	28.41	29.00
5 wickets in innings	7	0
10 wickets in match	1	0
Best bowling	7/35	2/26
Catches/stumpings	50/–	1/–
- Source: ESPNcricinfo, 25 June 2021

Roy James Barratt (3 May 1942 – 19 January 1995) was an English cricketer who appeared in 70 first-class matches for Leicestershire between 1961 and 1970.

Barratt was a left-arm slow orthodox spin bowler with a low, almost round-arm action, and a tail-end left-handed batsman, known as "Basher" for his uninhibited approach to batting. He made his first-class debut for Leicestershire on 21 June 1961 in the 1961 County Championship. His best bowling figures in an innings were 7 for 35 against Gloucestershire in 1969. His best match figures were 10 for 90 against Hampshire in 1965, when he took 5 for 45 in each innings.

He was born in Aylestone, Leicester, and died at Coalville, Leicestershire, after suffering a heart attack. His family owned a building business. Their projects included the pavilion at Leicestershire's home ground at Grace Road, which they built during Barratt's playing career with the club; he took part in the construction work.
