= Claude Barrat =

Canadian notary and court clerk

Claude Barrat (French: [klod baʁa]; c. 1658 – c. 1711) was a notary and court clerk in Placentia (then known as Plaisance), Newfoundland.

A census in 1691 confirms Barrat's presence in the New World and his involvement in the fishing industry at Saint-Pierre. In 1696, he was appointed notary and court clerk in Placentia by Governor Jacques-François de Monbeton de Brouillan.
