= Australia's Open Garden Scheme =

Australia's Open Garden Scheme was a non-profit organisation that began in Victoria, Australia in 1987 but closed its doors in June 2015 due to financial issues. Its aim was to promote the knowledge and pleasure of gardens and gardening across Australia. Under the scheme, private gardens opened for public viewing for one or two weekends a year. About 650 gardens were opened annually across Australia but declining numbers and competition from groups promoting their own events outside of their booklet meant that it was not viable. Each year over 275,000 adults visited open gardens, together with accompanying children. A schedule for openings across Australia was published annually.

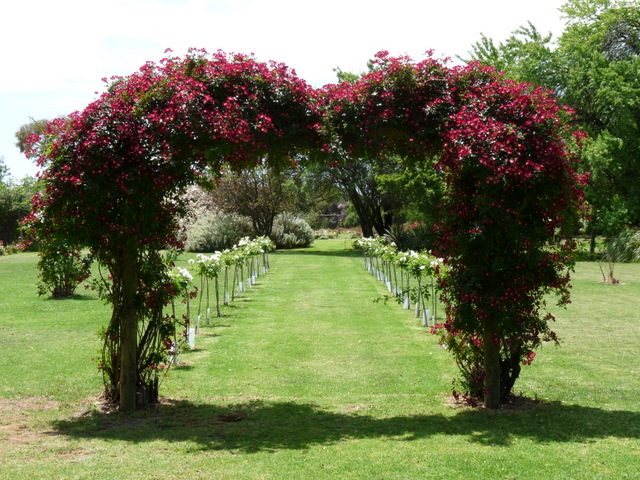
Ruston's Rose garden

The scheme grew out of the practice in Victoria of "grand" private gardens in the hill country near Melbourne opening occasionally for public viewing for the benefit of charities. However the scheme did not limit itself to large gardens, with many normal-sized suburban gardens, and even tiny inner-city plots, included. Most openings in the southern, temperate zone occurred between October and May (spring and autumn in the Southern Hemisphere), while tropical gardens open during the winter months.

A nominal fee was charged for each viewing. This money was divided with 35% going to the garden owner or their nominated charity, and 65% going to the Open Garden Scheme. After funding the scheme operating costs, the remainder was given as grants to community garden projects, with over $800,000 in grants being made by the end of 2006. Additionally garden owners passed on over $3.5 million to their nominated charities since the commencement of the scheme.

In 2015 new non-for-profit organisations have sprung up to carry on some of the tradition in individual states including Open Gardens SA and Open Gardens Victoria. Both schemes aim to educate and promote the enjoyment, knowledge and benefits of gardens and gardening and are promoting a long list of garden openings from spring through to autumn each year. They have attracted good membership numbers and visitor numbers.

== See also ==
- Heritage Gardens in Australia
- Gardening in Australia
