= Dingley Bypass =

Arterial road in Victoria

Dingley Bypass Victoria
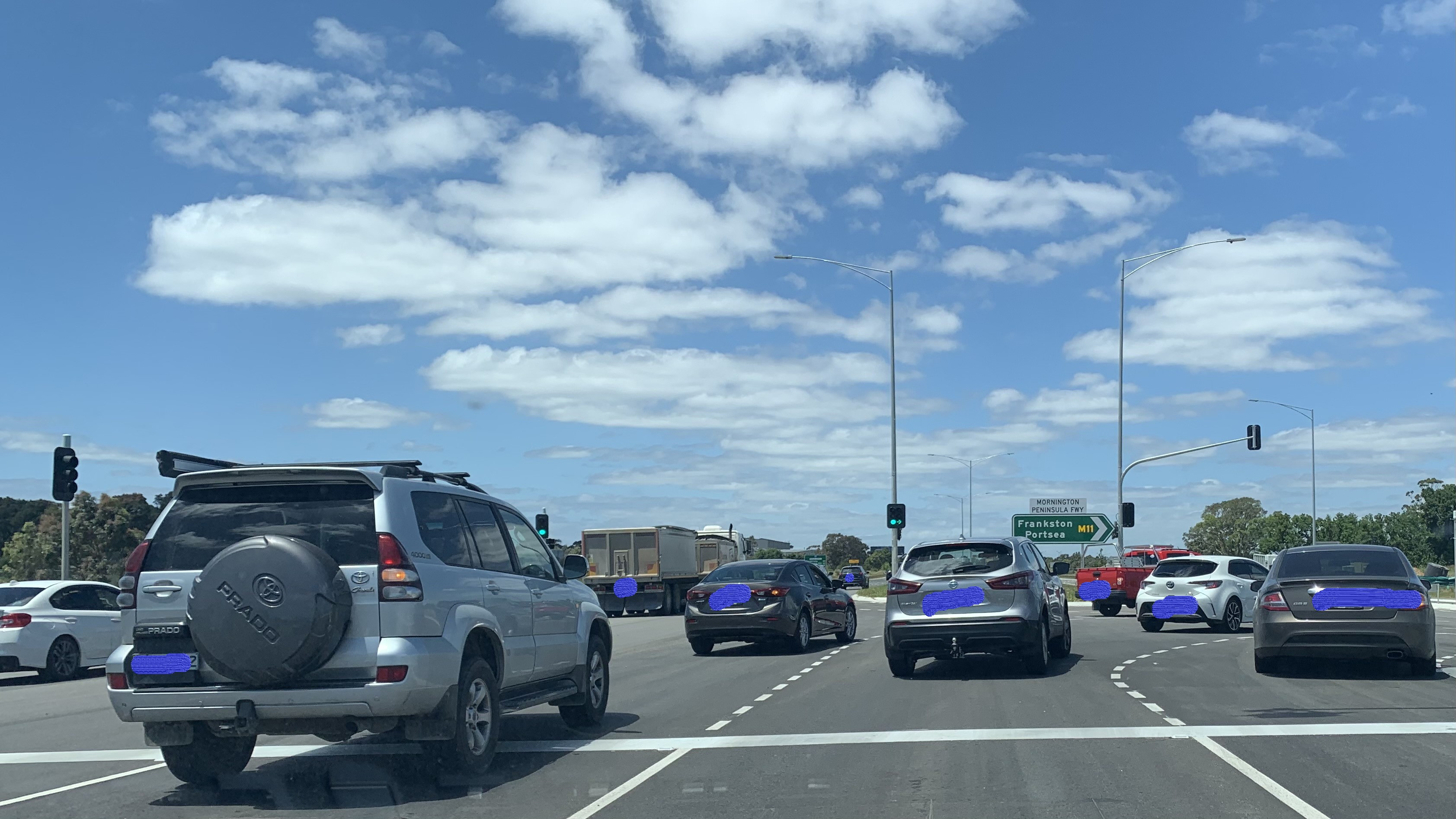
- Turning off Dingley Bypass at its intersection with Mornington Peninsula Freeway
- Coordinates: 37.938694°S 145.079652°E (Northwest end); 37.965366°S 145.134927°E (Southeast end)

General information
- Type: Highway
- Length: 6.1 km (3.8 mi)
- Opened: 11 March 2016
- Route number(s): Metro Route 87 (2016–present); Concurrencies: Metro Route 14 (2016–present) (Clarinda–Oakleigh South)

Major junctions
- Northwest end: South Road; Oakleigh South, Melbourne
- Warrigal Road; Kingston Road; Boundary Road; Mornington Peninsula Freeway
- Southeast end: Westall Road; Springvale South, Melbourne

Location(s)
- Major settlements: Dingley Village

Highway system
- Highways in Australia; National Highway • Freeways in Australia; Highways in Victoria

Dingley Bypass is an arterial road in southeastern Melbourne, Victoria, Australia that travels along the Dingley Arterial route from Warrigal Road to Westall Road.

== Route ==
Dingley Bypass commences at the intersection with Warrigal and South Roads in Oakleigh South and heads in a south-easterly direction as a six-lane, dual-carriageway road, intersecting with Kingston Road, Boundary Road, and then a short distance later with the northern end of Mornington Peninsula Freeway. It continues east until eventually terminating at the intersection with Westall Road in Springvale South.

West of Warrigal Road, South Road continues via Moorabbin all the way to the bayside Beach Road at Brighton.

== History ==
Dingley Bypass forms part of the Dingley Arterial Project, which was first proposed as a freeway in the 1969 Melbourne Transportation Plan. The Victorian Labor Party first promised to build the bypass before the 1999 state election, but cancelled the project after being elected, choosing to re-allocate the $30 million in funds towards what would eventually become EastLink. The state Liberal Party then promised $180 million to build the bypass if they won the 2002 state election, but they were unsuccessful.

The Liberal–Nationals state government announced in May 2012 that they would commit $156 million for the construction of the Dingley Bypass, which would be a new 6.4 km dual carriageway link between Warrigal Road and Westall Road in Melbourne's south-eastern suburbs.

Construction of the Dingley Bypass began in 2014 and was completed in March 2016, 5 months ahead of schedule. The $156 million, 6.4 kilometre Dingley Bypass was completed five months ahead of schedule and was opened on 11 March 2016 by Minister for Roads, Luke Donnellan. A divided highway with 3 lanes in each direction, it was expected to carry 35,000 vehicles each day. A new 5.2 kilometer bike path also runs beside the Bypass and extends from the existing bike path at Old Dandenong Road and provides links to Victoria's greater bicycle network.

Dingley Bypass was signed as Metropolitan Route 87 along its entire length upon opening.

The passing of the Road Management Act 2004 through the Parliament of Victoria granted the responsibility of overall management and development of Victoria's major arterial roads to VicRoads: VicRoads declared the road in 2019 as Dingley Bypass (Arterial #6422), from Oakleigh South to Springvale South.

=== Proposed traffic light removal ===
In November 2018 leading up to the state election, the Victorian Liberal Party proposed removing all traffic lights on the Dingley Bypass to create a Dingley Freeway, expected to cost $600 million. The party did not win the election.

== Major intersections ==
LGA	Location	km	mi	Destinations	Notes
Glen Eira-Kingston boundary	Bentleigh East–Oakleigh South–Moorabbin–Heatherton quadripoint	0.0	0.0	South Road (Metro Route 14 west) – Moorabbin, Brighton	Western terminus of road and Metro Route 87; Western terminus of concurrency with Metro Route 14
Glen Eira-Kingston boundary	Bentleigh East–Oakleigh South–Moorabbin–Heatherton quadripoint	0.0	0.0	Warrigal Road (Metro Route 15) – Mentone, Oakleigh	
Kingston	Oakleigh South–Clarinda–Heatherton tripoint	1.7	1.1	Clarinda Road – Clarinda, Huntingdale	
Kingston	Clarinda–Heatherton boundary	3.2	2.0	Kingston Road (Metro Route 14 east, unallocated west) – Heatherton, Noble Park	No right turn west- or east-bound into Kingston Road; Eastern terminus of concurrency with Metro Route 14
Kingston	Dingley Village–Heatherton boundary	4.0	2.5	Boundary Road (Metro Route 23) – Mordialloc, Clayton	
Kingston	Dingley Village	4.5	2.8	Mornington Peninsula Freeway (M11) – Frankston, Rosebud	
Kingston	Dingley Village	5.5	3.4	Tootal Road – Dingley Village	
Greater Dandenong	Springvale South	6.1	3.8	Westall Road (Metro Route 49) – Clayton South, Dandenong South	Eastern terminus of road and Metro Route 87
Incomplete access; Route transition
