= Dingley Arterial Project =

Road in Melbourne, Australia

Dingley Arterial Dingley Bypass / Westall Road / Dandenong Bypass Victoria
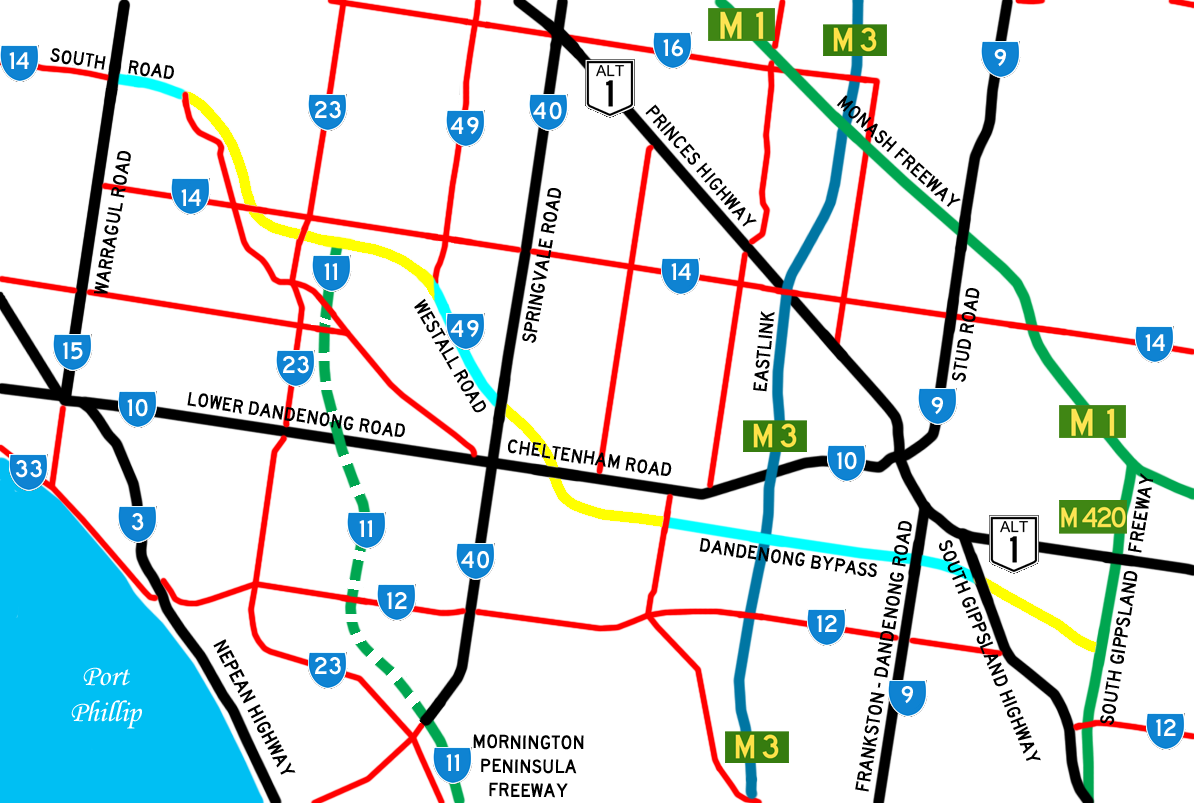
- Map of the Dingley Freeway, showing completed sections (in cyan) as of 2007. The section between South Gippsland Highway and South Gippsland Freeway section is the only incomplete section as of 2026

General information
- Type: Highway
- Length: 17.3 km (11 mi)

Major junctions
- west end: South Road; Oakleigh South, Melbourne
- Warrigal Road; Kingston Road; Boundary Road; Mornington Peninsula Freeway; Westall Road; Springvale Road; EastLink; Frankston-Dandenong Road
- east end: South Gippsland Highway; Dandenong South, Melbourne

Highway system
- Highways in Australia; National Highway • Freeways in Australia; Highways in Victoria

The Dingley Arterial Road Project (in the Dingley Freeway reserve) is a partially completed arterial standard road which runs east to west through the southern suburbs of Melbourne, Australia.

Although the road was designed to be a freeway for the full length of the planned 19-kilometre route, plans have instead evolved over time, which has resulted in the construction of bypasses for the Melbourne suburbs of Mordialloc, Springvale, and Dandenong.

== Intended route ==
Starting at the intersection of Warrigal Road and South Road in Moorabbin, the route travels east, crossing Old Dandenong Road, Clarinda Road, Kingston Road and Boundary Road before intersecting with the northern extension of the Mornington Peninsula Freeway. It then interchanges with Westall Road as the route starts to travel in a south easterly direction. The route then crosses Springvale Road, Cheltenham Road, Chapel Road, Stanley Road, Perry Road and Chandler Road before approaching a diamond interchange with the EastLink tollway. The route then continues east, crossing Hammond Road, Dandenong – Frankston Road and the South Gippsland Highway before finishing with a fully grade separated T interchange with the South Gippsland Freeway in Dandenong South.

The freeway was originally designated in the 1969 Melbourne Transportation Plan as part of the F2 Freeway corridor. The original plan shows the freeway extending down South Road over Nepean Highway heading north through Brighton and Elwood, following the Barkly Street-Punt Road-Hoddle Street corridor up through Merri Creek joining the Craigieburn Bypass to the Hume Freeway.

== Completed sections ==
From west to east, the completed sections are:

Section		Length	Completion date	Notes
South Road Extension	Warrigal Road to Old Dandenong Road	1 km	2007	Duplicated in 2014–2016 as part of the Dingley Bypass
Dingley Bypass	Warrigal Road to Westall Road	6.4 km	11 March 2016	Section between Warrigal Road and Old Dandenong Road built as part of South Road Extension in 2007; Intersects with Westall Road Extension
Westall Road Extension	Heatherton Road to Springvale Road	2.8 km	1995	The section between Heatherton Road and Dingley Bypass is not part of the Dingley Arterial alignment.
Dandenong Bypass	Springvale Road to Perry Road	3.3 km	20 December 2012	
Dandenong Bypass	Perry Road to South Gippsland Highway	4.8 km	9 December 2007	

=== South Road Extension (2007-16) ===
The South Road Extension runs along the Dingley Freeway route from Warrigal Road in Moorabbin to Old Dandenong Road in Heatherton. This was designed to remove traffic from White Street, Mordialloc as it was experiencing heavy-local traffic congestion, as a result of the most direct route linking the Mornington Peninsula Freeway with the Nepean Highway, along with Boundary and Wells Road.

The 1 km extension commenced construction in September 2006 and was completed by the end of 2007, at a cost of $9.3 million for the South Road extension alone, but cost $24.5 million when combined with the associated projects.

The works involved constructing a two lane road to bypass a stretch of Old Dandenong Road which travelled through a residential area to Warrigal Road. A bicycle path was also constructed along the length of the extension. The extension also involved improvements to Old Dandenong Road and surrounding intersections as well as permanently blocking access to Old Dandenong Road north of the extension. The extension has a speed limit of 70 km/h.

Despite the road having successfully removed traffic from Old Dandenong Road (between Warrigal Road and the current South Road connection) it had also created a major bottleneck at the intersection of Kingston and Old Dandenong Road, particularly during peak hour.

The project was later duplicated and overwritten by the Dingley Bypass project below, which cut Old Dandenong Road in half in its vicinity.

=== Dingley Bypass ===
The state government announced in May 2012 they will commit $156 million for the construction of the Dingley Bypass, which will be a new 6.4 km dual carriageway link between Warrigal Road and Westall Road in Melbourne's South-Eastern suburbs.

Construction of the Dingley Bypass began in 2014 and was completed in March 2016, 5 months ahead of schedule. The $156 Million, 6.4 kilometre Dingley Bypass was completed five months ahead of schedule and was opened on 11 March 2016 by Minister for Roads, Luke Donnellan. A divided highway with 3 lanes in each direction, it is expected to carry 35,000 vehicles each day. A new 5.2 kilometre bike path also runs beside the Bypass and extends from the existing bike path at Old Dandenong Road and provides vital links to Victoria's greater bicycle network.

In November 2018 leading up to the state election, the Victorian Liberal Party proposed removing all traffic lights on the Dingley Bypass to create a Dingley Freeway. This was expected to cost $600 million. The party eventually did not win the election.

=== Westall Road Extension ===
The Extension runs along the Dingley Arterial route from Heatherton Road to Springvale Road in Springvale South. It commenced construction in 1994 and was finished in 1995. The extension is also known as the Springvale Bypass.

The works involved creating a 2.8 km divided four lane (two lanes each way) semi-freeway standard road to bypass the busy and congested centre of Springvale. The extension involves constructing part of the Dingley Freeway to the future site of an interchange with Westall Road before travelling along a temporary alignment to join up with the extended Westall Road south of Heatherton Road. Formerly, a speed limit of 100 km/h applied between Heatherton Road and Rowan Road, while an 80 km/h limit applies on the approaches to Heatherton and Springvale Roads, however both sides have been limited to 80 km/h as a part of the Dingley Bypass construction. A bicycle path was completed along the entire length of the road.

=== Dandenong Bypass ===
The Dandenong Bypass was completed along the alignment reserved for the Dingley Arterial corridor. The project was staged in two separate projects over seven years, and was opened to traffic between Springvale Road and South Gippsland Highway in December 2012. The entire bypass has a speed limit of 80 km/h with traffic light controlled intersections and overpasses at Cheltenham Road and EastLink. The total length of the bypass and Westall Road Extension combined is 11 km.

==== Springvale Road to Perry Road ====
The Springvale Road - Perry Road section of the bypass connects Westall Road to the already-open Perry Road to South Gippsland Highway section at Perry Road, creating an arterial standard highway, with traffic light controlled intersections and an overpass at Cheltenham Road.

The new section of road, which commenced construction in 2011, is expected to carry between 30,000 and 40,000 vehicles per day as well as a shared path being constructed alongside, linking to existing shared paths which already run along the built sections of the arterial. The construction of this section (at a cost of $74.6 million) was brought forward to commence in 2010 as part of the "Nation Building" initiatives in the 2009 Victorian State Budget. The project was completed early and under budget (previously estimated to cost $80 million) to traffic on 20 December 2012.

==== Perry Road to South Gippsland Highway ====
The bypass commenced construction in late 2005 between Perry Road and South Gippsland Highway as part of the EastLink project, with the $65 million works involving the creation of a four lane divided road with traffic light controlled access at roads which run north–south along the constructed route.

The 4.8 km bypass also included an overpass of the Cranbourne railway line as well as a diamond interchange with EastLink. The entire bypass has an 80 km/h speed limit. The project was completed and opened to traffic on 9 December 2007.

== Future sections ==
=== Dandenong Bypass Extension (South Gippsland Highway to South Gippsland Freeway) ===
The final section to be built would be an eastern section running from the current Dandenong Bypass intersection with South Gippsland Highway to South Gippsland Freeway. Such a section would be the final link to be built but it would require the construction of a freeway style interchange on the South Gippsland Freeway end. The Victorian government had agreed to start this section by 2020, although this section is still in early planning.
