= Doncaster–Mordialloc Road =

Road in Victoria, Australia

Doncaster–Mordialloc Road (numerous constituent roads) Victoria
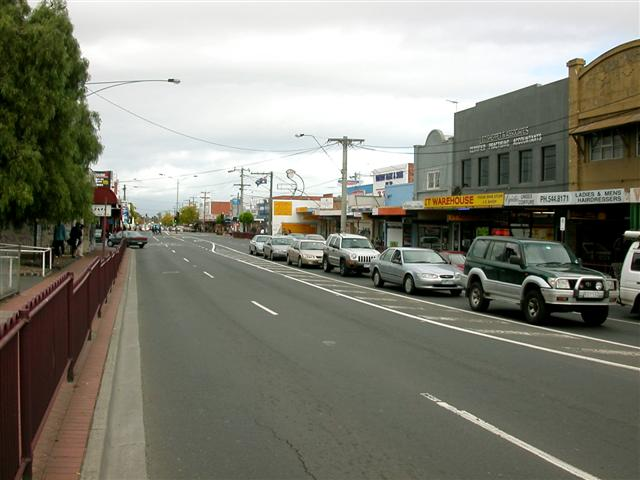
- Clayton Road through Clayton
- Coordinates: 37.773064°S 145.146146°E (North end); 38.011455°S 145.103369°E (South end)

General information
- Type: Road
- Length: 26.9 km (17 mi)
- Gazetted: September 1960
- Route number(s): Metro Route 23 (1989–present) (Doncaster–Braeside)

Major junctions
- North end: King Street; Doncaster East, Melbourne
- Doncaster Road; Eastern Freeway; Whitehorse Road; Canterbury Road; Burwood Highway; Princes Highway; Dingley Bypass; Lower Dandenong Road
- South end: Wells Road; Braeside, Melbourne

Location(s)
- Major suburbs: Box Hill, Mount Waverley, Clayton, Dingley Village

Doncaster–Mordialloc Road is a major arterial road through the eastern and south-eastern suburbs of Melbourne. This name is not widely known to most drivers, as the entire allocation is still best known as by the names of its constituent parts: Victoria Street, Wetherby Road, Middleborough Road, Stephensons Road, Clayton Road and Boundary Road. This article will deal with the entire length of the corridor for sake of completion.

== Route ==
Doncaster–Mordialloc Road commences at the intersection of King and Victoria Streets at Doncaster East and heads south as a two-lane, single carriageway road along Victoria Street until it intersections with Doncaster Road, changing its name to Wetherby Road and continuing south as a four-lane, single carriageway road, before crossing Koonung Creek and meeting with Eastern Freeway at an interchange in Box Hill North. It changes names again to Middleborough Road and continues south through Box Hill before intersecting with Highbury Road in Mount Waverley, changing name again to Stephensons Road, and continuing south through Mount Waverley. It intersects with Ferntree Gully Road in Oakleigh East, changing names again to Clayton Road, and continues through Clayton, intersecting with Kingston and Heatherton Roads in Clayton South and changes name a final time to Boundary Road, widening to a four-lane, dual-carriageway road through Dingley, before eventually terminating at the bridge over Mordialloc Creek in Braeside, continuing southeast-wards as Wells Road.

== History ==
The passing of the Country Roads Act 1958 (itself an evolution from the original Highways and Vehicles Act 1924) provided for the declaration of State Highways and Main Roads, roads partially financed by the state government through the Country Roads Board (later VicRoads). Doncaster–Mordialloc Road was declared a Main Road on 7 September 1960, between Doncaster Road in Doncaster and Wells Road in Mordialloc, but was still sign-posted as its constituent parts.

Doncaster–Mordialloc Road was signed as Metropolitan Route 23 between Doncaster Road and Wells Road in 1989.

The passing of the Road Management Act 2004 granted the responsibility of overall management and development of Victoria's major arterial roads to VicRoads: in 2004, VicRoads re-declared Doncaster–Mordialloc Road (Arterial #5803) from King Street in Doncaster East to Wells Road in Braeside. The road is still presently known (and signposted) as its constituent parts along its entire length.

== Major intersections ==
LGA	Location	km	mi	Destinations	Notes
Manningham	Doncaster East–Templestowe boundary	0.0	0.0	King Street – Templestowe, Templestowe Lower	Northern terminus of Victoria Street
Manningham	Doncaster	1.6	0.99	Doncaster Road (Metro Routes 36/40) – Doncaster, Donvale	Northern terminus of Metro Route 23; Name change: Victoria Street (north), Wetherby Road (south)
Koonung Creek		2.7	1.7	Bridge over river (name unknown)	
Whitehorse	Box Hill North–Blackburn North boundary	2.9	1.8	Eastern Freeway (M3) – Collingwood, Ringwood	Diamond interchange Name change: Wetherby Road (north), Middleborough Road (south)
Whitehorse	Box Hill–Blackburn boundary	5.3	3.3	Whitehorse Road (Metro Route 34) – Box Hill, Ringwood	
Whitehorse	Box Hill–Blackburn boundary	5.5	3.4	Lilydale and Belgrave railway lines	
Whitehorse	Box Hill–Blackburn–Box Hill South–Blackburn South quadripoint	6.5	4.0	Canterbury Road (Metro Route 32) – Canterbury, Montrose	
Whitehorse	Burwood–Burwood East boundary	8.9	5.5	Burwood Highway (Metro Route 26) – Burwood, Ferntree Gully	
Whitehorse–Monash boundary	Burwood–Burwood East–Mount Waverley tripoint	9.5	5.9	Highbury Road – Burwood, Vermont South	Name change: Middleborough Road (north), Stephensons Road (south)
Monash	Mount Waverley	10.9	6.8	High Street Road (Metro Route 24) – Prahran, Glen Iris, Wantirna South	
Monash	Mount Waverley	11.5	7.1	Glen Waverley railway line	
Monash	Mount Waverley	12.6	7.8	Waverley Road – Malvern East, Chadstone, Wheelers Hill	
Scothmans Creek		13.4	8.3	Bridge over river (name unknown)	
Monash	Clayton–Oakleigh East–Mount Waverley tripoint	14.2	8.8	Ferntree Gully Road (Metro Route 22) – Oakleigh, Ferntree Gully	Name change: Stephensons Road (north), Clayton Road (south)
Monash	Clayton–Oakleigh East boundary	15.6	9.7	Princes Highway (Alt National Route 1) – City, Dandenong	
Monash	Clayton–Oakleigh East boundary	15.9	9.9	North Road (Metro Route 18) – Brighton, Oakleigh, Rowville	
Monash	Clayton	17.0	10.6	Pakenham, Cranbourne and Bairnsdale railway lines	
Kingston–Monash boundary	Clayton–Clayton South boundary	17.5	10.9	Centre Road (Metro Route 16) – Brighton East, Mulgrave	
Kingston	Clarinda–Clayton South boundary	20.8	12.9	Heatherton Road (Metro Route 14 east) – Noble Park, Endeavour Hills; Kingston Road (Metro Route 14 west) – Heatherton	Name change: Clayton Road (north), Boundary Road (south)
Kingston	Dingley Village–Heatherton boundary	21.0	13.0	Dingley Bypass (Metro Route 87) – Moorabbin, Dandenong South	
Kingston	Dingley Village–Heatherton boundary	21.8	13.5	Old Dandenong Road – Heatherton, Dingley Village	
Kingston	Dingley Village–Heatherton–Moorabbin Airport tripoint	22.5	14.0	Centre Dandenong Road (B980 east, unallocated west) – Cheltenham, Dingley Village	
Kingston	Dingley Village–Mordialloc–Braeside–Moorabbin Airport quadripoint	24.1	15.0	Lower Dandenong Road (Metro Route 10) – Mentone, Dandenong	
Kingston	Mordialloc–Braeside boundary	25.7	16.0	White Street (west) – Mordialloc; Malcolm Road (east) – Braeside	
Kingston	Mordialloc–Braeside boundary	26.4	16.4	Governor Road (Metro Route 12 east, unallocated west) – Mordialloc, Dandenong South, Narre Warren	
Kingston	Mordialloc–Braeside boundary	26.9	16.7	Boundary Road (Metro Route 23 north) – Mordialloc, Braeside	Southern end of Boundary Road
Mordialloc Creek		26.9	16.7	Bridge over river (name unknown)	
Kingston	Aspendale Gardens	26.9	16.7	Wells Road (Metro Route 23 south) – Chelsea Heights	Northern end of Wells Road; Metro Route 23 continues southeast along Wells Road
1.000 mi = 1.609 km; 1.000 km = 0.621 mi: Route transition

== Gallery ==
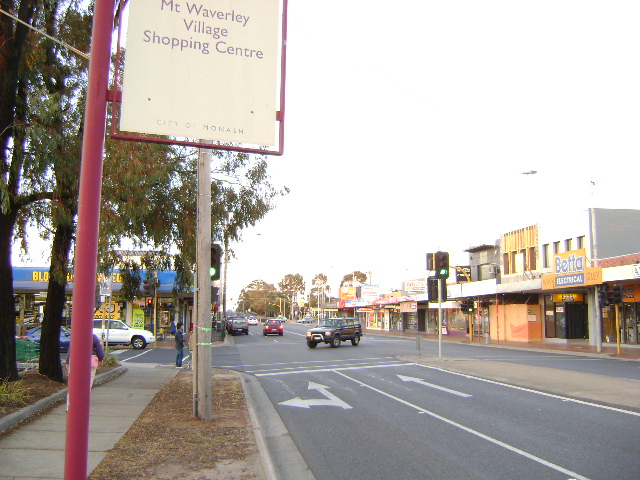
Stephensons Road, Mount Waverley
