= Westall Road =

Road in Melbourne, Victoria, Australia

Westall Road Springvale Bypass Victoria
- Coordinates: 37.924660°S 145.143482°E (North end); 37.983073°S 145.146056°E (South end)

General information
- Type: Road
- Length: 6.8 km (4.2 mi)
- Route number(s): Metro Route 49 (1989–present)

Major junctions
- North end: Princes Highway; Clayton, Melbourne
- Centre Road; Heatherton Road; Dingley Bypass; Springvale Road
- South end: Dandenong Bypass; Keysborough, Melbourne

Location(s)
- Major suburbs: Clayton, Clayton South, Springvale, Springvale South

Westall Road (also known as the Springvale Bypass) is a major north to south thoroughfare west of Springvale, Victoria, Australia.

== Route ==
Starting at the intersection with Princes Highway in Clayton, the road head south as a six-lane, dual-carriageway road, intersecting with Centre Road, over the Cranbourne and Pakenham railway lines and an intersection with Heatherton Road, all with a speed limit of 80 km/h. Westall Road then continues on as a semi-freeway standard road along the reservation of the Dingley Freeway with a speed limit of 80 km/h (formerly 100 km/h until the intersection with Dingley Bypass), where it narrows to a four-lane dual-carriageway road and heads south-east until it reaches Springvale Road. It continues as the Dandenong Bypass east eventually to Dandenong South.

== History ==
Historically before the reconstruction and extension works, Westall Road ran as a semi-major road from just south of the Dandenong Rail line at Westall Station to Heatherton Road, and as a minor road from the railway line to Centre Road. The previous thoroughfare consisted of taking McNaughton Road, Kombi Road and Rayhur Street.

The extensions north to Princes Highway and south to Springvale Road were designed to reduce traffic which travels through Springvale via Springvale Road, as it has a 70 km/h speed limit for most of its length in which it is bypassed as well as having a reduced 60 km/h limit through the Springvale shopping area with this dropping to 40 km/h during school times. Traffic was further delayed by the level crossing adjacent to Springvale Station until 2014, and the particularly slow Springvale Junction. The upgrade of Westall Road has allowed north–south through traffic to avoid this area.

Westall Road was signed as Metropolitan Route 49 between Clayton and Clayton South in 1989, extended south to Keysborough when the southern extension opened in 1995, and extended north to Clayton when the northern extension opened in 2001.

The passing of the Road Management Act 2004 granted the responsibility of overall management and development of Victoria's major arterial roads to VicRoads: in 2004, VicRoads re-declared the road as Westall Road (Arterial #5056), beginning at Princes Highway at Clayton and ending at Springvale Road in Keysborough.

=== Springvale Bypass (Stage 1) ===
Prior to construction of the bypass, Westall Road (as it existed) from Heatherton Road to Centre Road consisted of a simple dual-lane undivided road. The northern section of Stage 1 - an extension of Westall Road from Centre Road in Clayton South north to Princes Highway in Clayton - was built as a six-lane dual-carriageway road using unreinforced concrete pavement, opening in October 1992. To better enable Westall Road to serve as a high-capacity alternative route to Springvale Road, the southern section of Stage 1 - a new six-lane dual-carriageway alignment running parallel just to the west of the existing Westall Road - was constructed between Centre Road and Rayhur Street, including a grade separated level crossing over the Pakenham and Cranbourne railway lines, in conjunction with duplication works to upgrade Westall Road to a six lane divided road between Rayhur Street and Heatherton Road; these works were completed by April 2001.

=== Springvale Bypass (Stage 2) ===
The southern extension of Westall Road runs along the Dingley Arterial route from Heatherton Road in Springvale South to Springvale Road in Keysborough. It commenced construction in 1994 and was finished in 1995. The extension was previously known as the Westall Road Extension from 1995 to 2016.

The works involved creating a 2.8 km divided four lane (two lanes each way) semi-freeway standard road to bypass the busy and congested centre of Springvale. The extension involves constructing part of the Dingley Freeway to the future site of an interchange with Westall Road before travelling along a temporary alignment to join up with the extended Westall Road south of Heatherton Road. A speed limit of 100 km/h applied between Heatherton Road and Rowan Road from 1995 until 2016 when it was permanently changed to 80 km/h as a result of the Dingley Bypass. The reason being VicRoads determined the stretch of road too short to have a limit of 100 km/h. The limit had always been an 80 km/h limit on the approaches to Heatherton and Springvale Roads. A bicycle path was completed along the entire length of the road.

As a result of the Dingley Bypass, there is now a T-intersection in place close to Heatherton Road connecting both the bypass and Westall Road. Original plans were for grade separation at this intersection.

== Major intersections ==
LGA	Location	km	mi	Destinations	Notes
Monash–Greater Dandenong border	Clayton–Springvale border	0.0	0.0	Princes Highway (Alt National Route 1) – City, Oakleigh, Dandenong	Northern terminus of road and Metro Route 49
Monash–Kingston–Greater Dandenong tripoint	Clayton–Clayton South–Springvale tripoint	0.75	0.47	Centre Road (Metro Route 16) – Brighton East, Mulgrave	
Kingston–Greater Dandenong border	Clayton South–Springvale border	1.7	1.1	Pakenham and Cranbourne railway lines	
Kingston–Greater Dandenong border	Clayton South–Springvale border	2.1	1.3	Fairbank Road (west) – Clayton South; Brear Street (east) – Springvale	
Kingston–Greater Dandenong border	Clayton South–Springvale border	2.4	1.5	Osborne Avenue – Springvale railway station	
Greater Dandenong	Springvale–Springvale South border	4.0	2.5	Heatherton Road (Metro Route 14) – Heatherton, Noble Park	
Greater Dandenong	Springvale South	4.6	2.9	Dingley Bypass (Metro Route 87) – Moorabbin	
Kingston–Greater Dandenong border	Springvale South–Dingley Village–Keysborough tripoint	6.8	4.2	Springvale Road (Metro Route 40) – Springvale, Edithvale	
Kingston–Greater Dandenong border	Springvale South–Dingley Village–Keysborough tripoint	6.8	4.2	Dandenong Bypass (Metro Route 49) – Dandenong South	Southern terminus of road; Metro Route 49 continues east along Dandenong Bypass
1.000 mi = 1.609 km; 1.000 km = 0.621 mi: Route transition
