= State (Bell/Springvale) Highway =

Highway in Melbourne, Victoria

State (Bell/Springvale) Highway (numerous constituent roads) Victoria
- Route of the Highway
- Coordinates: 37.736634°S 144.929486°E (Northwest end); 38.038699°S 145.108616°E (Southeast end)

General information
- Type: Highway
- Length: 50.2 km (31 mi)
- Gazetted: August 1947 (as Main Road); June 1983 (as State Highway)
- Route number(s): Metro Route 40 (1965–present) Entire route; Concurrencies: Metro Route 47 (1989–present) (Templestowe Lower–Doncaster); Metro Route 36 (1965–present) (Doncaster–Donvale)
- Former route number: Metro Route 11 (1965–1989) (Donvale–Chelsea Heights)
- Tourist routes: Tourist Route 2 (Heidelberg–Bulleen)

Major junctions
- Northwest end: CityLink; Pascoe Vale South, Melbourne
- Pascoe Vale Road; Sydney Road; St Georges Road; Lower Heidelberg Road; Eastern Freeway; EastLink; Canterbury Road; Burwood Highway; Monash Freeway; Princes Highway; Westall Road; Mornington Peninsula Freeway
- Southeast end: Springvale Road; Chelsea Heights, Melbourne

Location(s)
- Major settlements: Coburg, Heidelberg, Doncaster, Nunawading, Glen Waverley, Springvale

Highway system
- Highways in Australia; National Highway • Freeways in Australia; Highways in Victoria

State (Bell/Springvale) Highway, also known as Bell Street/Springvale Road State Highway (after its longest constituent parts), is the longest self-contained urban highway in Melbourne, Australia, linking CityLink and Mornington Peninsula Freeway through Melbourne's north-eastern suburbs. These names are not widely known to most drivers, as the entire allocation is still best known as by the names of its constituent parts (some of which are only contiguous with the highway for a small section): Bell Street, Banksia Street, Manningham Road, Williamsons Road, Doncaster Road, Mitcham Road and Springvale Road. This article will deal with the entire length of the corridor for sake of completeness.

== Route ==
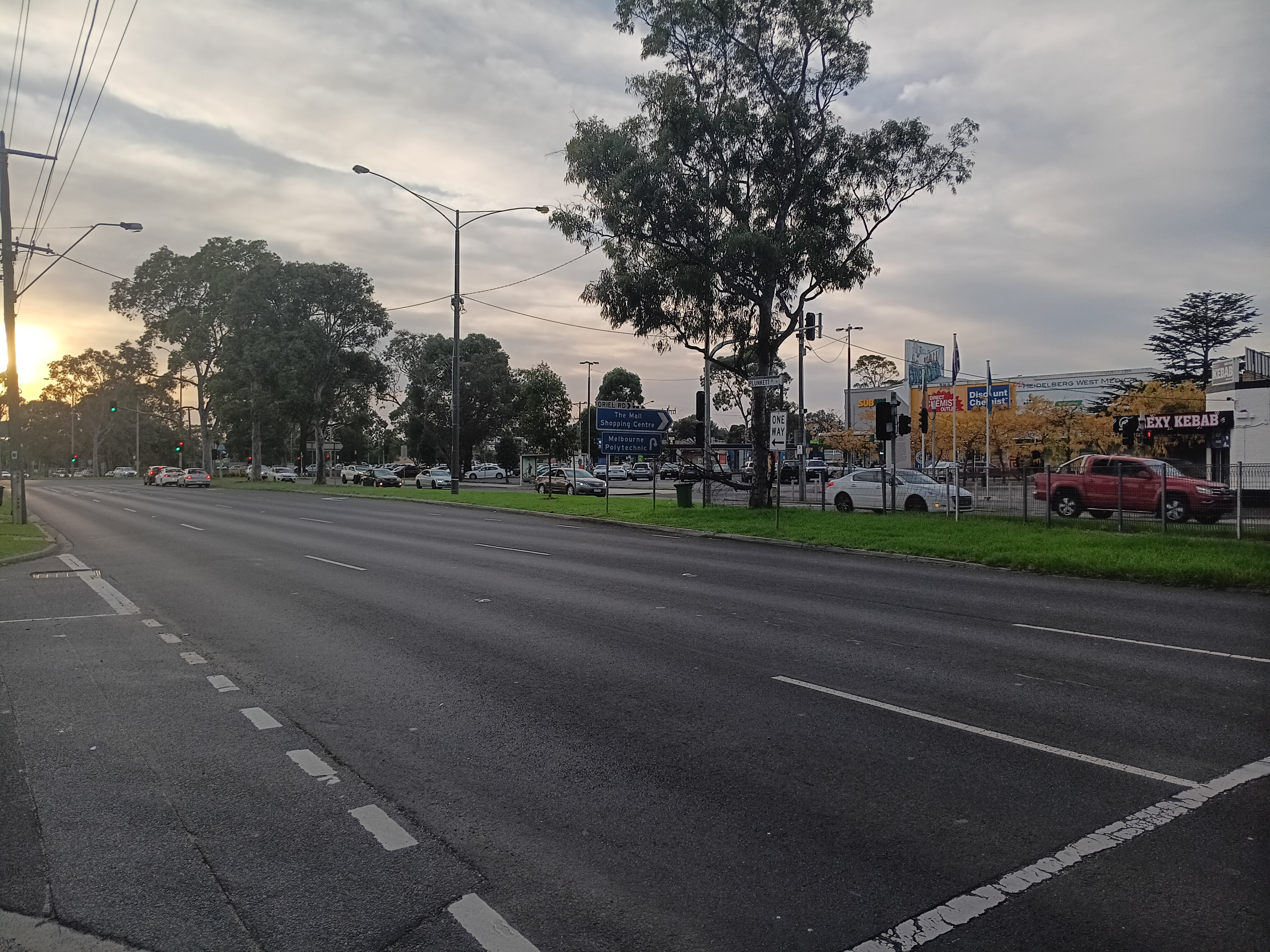
Bell Street in Heidelberg

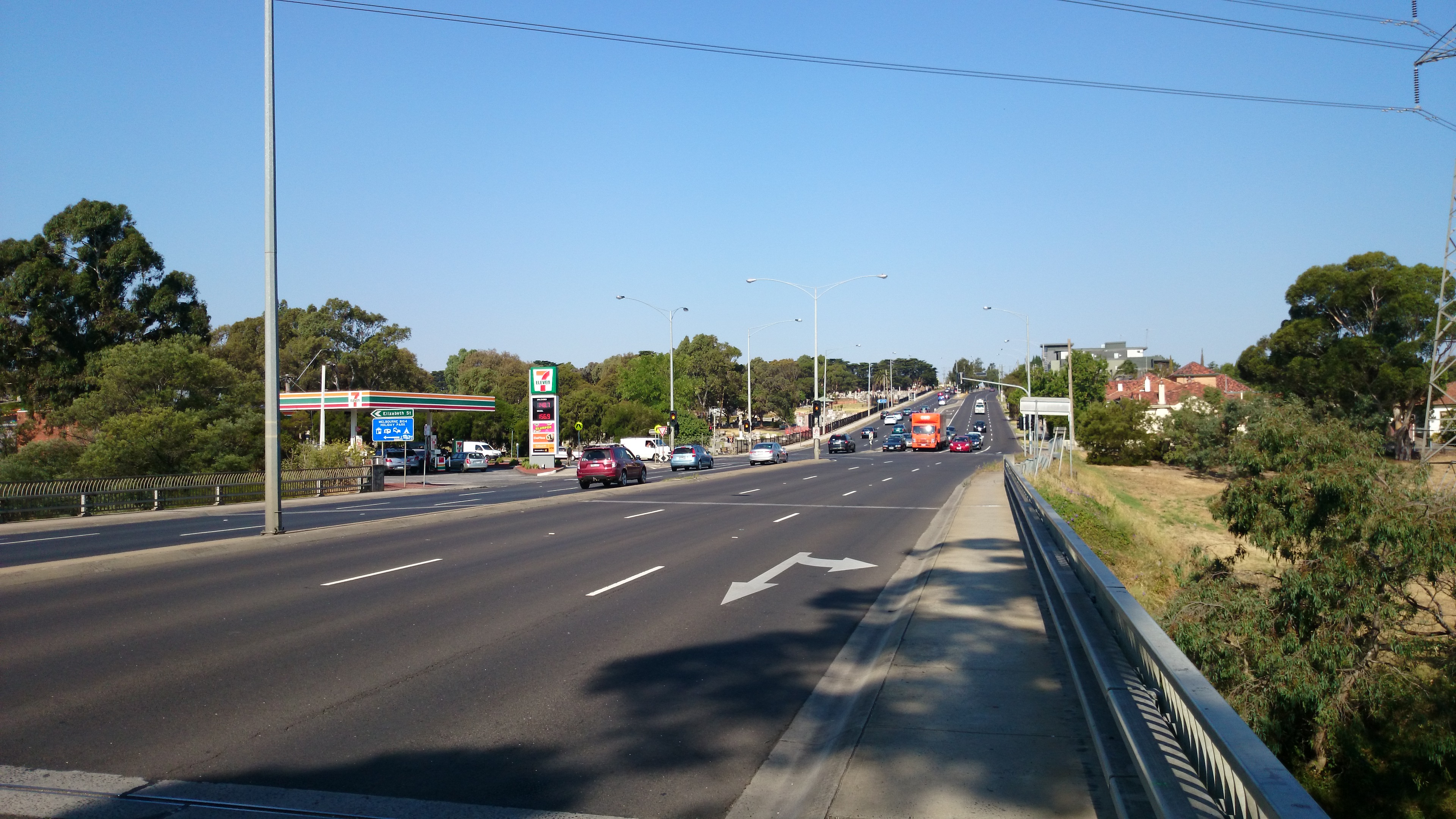
Bell Street in Coburg

Bell Street (and the beginning of the north-western section of the highway) starts at the interchange with CityLink in Pascoe Vale South and heads east as a four-lane, single-carriageway road to Sydney Road in Coburg, then widening to a dual-carriageway road varying between 4 and 6 lanes through Preston, then along Bell-Banksia Link to Banksia Street through Heidelberg to the Yarra River. As Manningham Road, it continues east past Bulleen Road (where the north-western section of the highway ends) through Bulleen to Doncaster, where it becomes Williamsons Road, then continues east along Doncaster and Mitcham Roads through Doncaster East. At the northern edge of Donvale it intersects with and changes name to Springvale Road, where it heads south over the Eastern Freeway/EastLink interchange (where the beginning of the south-eastern section of the highway starts) and continues south through Nunawading, Glen Waverley, Mulgrave and Springvale, where the south-eastern section of the highway eventually terminates at the interchange with Mornington Peninsula Freeway in Chelsea Heights (Springvale Road continues southwards to Edithvale).

Throughout the 1980s and 1990s, the Doncaster Road section carried around 50,000 vehicles per hour at peak, but this number dropped in 1997 after the extension of the Eastern Freeway.

Many junctions with CityLink, Sydney Road, Eastern Freeway, Monash Freeway, Princes Highway, and Mornington Peninsula Freeway contribute to large traffic volumes along the corridor.

== History ==
The passing of the Highways and Vehicles Act 1924 through the Parliament of Victoria provided for the declaration of State Highways and Main Roads, roads partially financed by the state government through the Country Roads Board (later VicRoads). Bell Street was declared a Main Road in August 1947, heading west from Main Heidelberg-Eltham Road (today Rosanna Road) along Burgundy and then Bell Streets in Heidelberg through Preston and Coburg to Moonee Ponds Creek at Pascoe Vale South. This was extended further west via a new bridge over Moonee Ponds Creek to connect directly to the Tullamarine Freeway extension and Pascoe Vale Road when it opened in 1970 (plans to do so had existed since 1950). After the passing of the Country Roads Act 1958 (itself an evolution from the original Highways and Vehicles Act 1924), Heidelberg-Doncaster Road (from Rosanna Road in Heidelberg heading east across Manningham Road and Williamsons Road to Doncaster Road in Doncaster) and Doncaster-Mitcham Road (from Williamsons Road in Doncaster heading east along Doncaster Road and Mitcham Road to Mitcham)) were declared Main Roads by the Country Roads Board on 7 September 1960, but were sign-posted as their constituent parts.

The entire route was declared a State Highway in June 1983, between Tullamarine Freeway in Pascoe Vale South and Mornington Peninsula Freeway in Chelsea Heights (unusually referred to as "Unnamed" in reports at the time, but named Bell Street/Springvale Road State Highway three years later), subsuming previous declarations of Bell Street, Heidelberg-Doncaster Road and Doncaster Mitcham Roads as Main Roads, and still sign-posted as its constituent parts. Work on the direct link between Bell and Banksia Streets (the "Bell-Banksia Link") in western Heidelberg, built to relieve traffic congestion and improve safety around the Burgundy Street shopping precinct, started in December 1988 and was completed on 1 July 1992, at a total cost of $40 million.

Bell Street was signed as Metropolitan Route 40 between Pascoe Vale South and Heidelberg in 1965, heading south at its western end along Reynolds Parade and Woodland Street to reach Lancefield Road: this was re-routed via Tullamarine Freeway in 1970. The south-eastern end of Metropolitan Route 40 was later re-routed to run across the entire corridor to Edithvale, replacing Metropolitan Route 11, in 1989, with an adjustment running from Burgundy, Jika and Dora Streets to the Bell-Banksia Link (and Banksia Street) through Heidelberg when it opened in 1992.

The passing of the Road Management Act 2004 granted the responsibility of overall management and development of Victoria's major arterial roads to VicRoads: in 2004, VicRoads re-declared the road as State (Bell/Springvale) Highway (Arterial #6400) in two sections: the north-western section between Hackett Street (just before the interchange with CityLink) in Pascoe Vale South and Bulleen Highway (Bulleen Road) in Bulleen; the south-eastern section between Eastern Freeway in Donvale and Mornington Peninsula Freeway in Chelsea Heights, while downgrading the remaining roads within the corridor as Main Roads: Manningham Road (Arterial #5221), Williamsons Road (Arterial #5225), Doncaster Road (Arterial #5805), Mitcham Road (Arterial #5804), and the remnants of Springvale Road (Arterial #5797), with the former alignment along Burgundy Street declared as Bell Street Road (Arterial #5818).

Regardless of official declarations, all roads along the corridor are still presently known (and signposted) as their constituent parts.

=== 1969 Melbourne Transportation Plan ===
The original 1969 Melbourne Transportation Plan showed the F4 Freeway following the Tullamarine Freeway, Bell and Banksia Streets, to Williamsons Road then joining the F7 Freeway heading south along the Middleborough Road and the Blackburn Road corridor to the F2 Freeway (Dingley Freeway) between Clayton and Westall Roads (rather than Springvale Road).

== Level crossing removal ==
In January 2010, rail tracks in Nunawading were lowered below-ground as part of a level-crossing elimination project. A similar project was undertaken in Springvale in May 2014. Under the Level Crossing Removal Project, the level crossing at Edithvale was removed in November 2021 and the level crossing at Bell was removed in May 2022.

== Major intersections ==
LGA	Location	km	mi	Destinations	Notes
Merri-bek	Pascoe Vale South	0.0	0.0	CityLink (M2) – Tullamarine, Melbourne Airport	Western terminus of north western section of highway (declared) and Metro Route 40; Western end of Bell Street
Merri-bek	Pascoe Vale South	0.0	0.0	Pascoe Vale Road (Metro Route 35) – Coolaroo, Moonee Ponds	Eastbound entry from Pascoe Vale Road via CityLink ramp
Merri-bek	Pascoe Vale South	1.0	0.62	Reynolds Parade, to CityLink (M2 south) – Docklands, Port Melbourne	
Merri-bek	Coburg	2.9	1.8	Upfield railway line	
Merri-bek	Coburg	3.3	2.1	Sydney Road (Metro Route 55) – Craigieburn, Brunswick, Docklands	No right turn westbound to Sydney Road northbound
Merri-bek	Coburg	3.5	2.2	Elm Grove, to Sydney Road northbound – Craigieburn	
Merri-bek	Coburg	4.4	2.7	Nicholson Street – Brunswick East	
Darebin	Preston	6.1	3.8	St Georges Road (Metro Route 45) – Reservoir, Fitzroy	
Darebin	Preston	6.3	3.9	Mernda railway line	
Darebin	Preston	6.6	4.1	High Street (Metro Route 29) – Epping, Richmond, St Kilda	
Darebin	Preston	6.9	4.3	Plenty Road (Metro Route 27) – Preston, Bundoora, Mernda	
Darebin	Preston	8.2	5.1	Albert Street (Metro Route 21) – Reservoir, Kew, Burnley	
Banyule	Bellfield–Heidelberg West–Heidelberg Heights–Ivanhoe quadpoint	10.5	6.5	Waterdale Road – Heidelberg West, Ivanhoe	
Banyule	Ivanhoe–Heidelberg Heights border	11.3	7.0	Bell Street – Heidelberg	Eastbound exit only Eastern end of Bell Street, western end of Bell-Banksia Link
Banyule	Ivanhoe–Heidelberg border	11.5	7.1	Upper Heidelberg Road (Metro Route 46) – Carlton, Greensborough, Diamond Creek	Westbound entrance only
Banyule	Heidelberg	11.9	7.4	Studley Road – Heidelberg, Ivanhoe	Eastern end of Bell–Banksia Link, western end of Banksia Street
Banyule	Heidelberg	12.0	7.5	Hurstbridge railway line	
Banyule	Heidelberg–Eaglemont border	12.8	8.0	Lower Heidelberg Road (Metro Route 44/Tourist Route 2 south) – Ivanhoe, Eltham, Kangaroo Ground	Western terminus of concurrency with Tourist Route 2
Manningham	Bulleen	13.9	8.6	Bridge Street (Tourist Route 2) – Bulleen	No right turn westbound into Bridge Street eastbound Eastern terminus of concurrency with Tourist Route 2 Eastern end of Banksia Street, western end of Manningham Road
Manningham	Bulleen	14.0	8.7	North East Link – Greensborough, Bulleen	Southbound entrance and northbound exit only Under construction, expected project completion 2028
Manningham	Bulleen	14.1	8.8	Bulleen Road (Metro Route 52) – Templestowe, Balwyn North	Eastern terminus of north western section of highway (declared)
Manningham	Bulleen	15.9	9.9	Thompsons Road (Metro Route 42) – Bulleen, Templestowe, Warrandyte	
Manningham	Templestowe Lower–Doncaster border	18.3	11.4	Williamsons Road (Metro Route 47 northeast) – Templestowe, Eltham	Northern terminus of concurrency with Metro Route 47; Eastern end of Manningham Road, northern end of Williamsons Road
Manningham	Doncaster	19.2	11.9	Doncaster Road (Metro Route 36 west) – Kew, Balwyn North; Tram Road (Metro Route 47 south) – Box Hill, Huntingdale	Southern terminus of concurrency with Metro Route 47, southern end of Williamsons Road; Western terminus of concurrency with Metro Route 36, western end of Doncaster Road
Manningham	Doncaster	20.8	12.9	Victoria Street (north) – Doncaster; Wetherby Road (Metro Route 23 south) – Mount Waverley, Clayton, Aspendale Gardens	
Manningham	Doncaster East	22.5	14.0	Blackburn Road (Metro Route 13) – Blackburn, Burwood East, Notting Hill	
Manningham	Donvale	23.5	14.6	Old Warrandyte Road – Park Orchards	Western end of Doncaster Road, eastern end of Mitcham Road
Manningham	Donvale	24.3	15.1	Mitcham Road (Metro Route 36 east) – Mitcham, Boronia; Springvale Road (Metro Route 52 north) – Donvale	Eastern terminus of concurrency with Metro Route 36, eastern end of Mitcham Road; Northern end of Springvale Road
Manningham–Whitehorse border	Donvale–Nunawading border	25.1	15.6	Eastern Freeway (M3 west) – City; EastLink (M3 east) – Frankston	Northern terminus of south-eastern section of highway (declared)
Whitehorse	Nunawading	26.7	16.6	Whitehorse Road (Metro Route 34) – Kew, Box Hill, Ringwood, Lilydale	
Whitehorse	Nunawading	26.9	16.7	Belgrave and Lilydale railway lines	
Whitehorse	Forest Hill	28.6	17.8	Canterbury Road (Metro Route 32) – Camberwell, Heathmont, Montrose	
Whitehorse	Forest Hill–Vermont South–Burwood East tripoint	30.8	19.1	Burwood Highway (Metro Route 26) – Kooyong, Burwood, Ferntree Gully	
Whitehorse–Monash border	Vermont South–Burwood East–Glen Waverley tripoint	31.6	19.6	Highbury Road – Burwood, Vermont South	
Monash	Glen Waverley	33.0	20.5	High Street Road (Metro Route 24) – Prahran, Ashwood, Wantirna South	
Monash	Glen Waverley	34.7	21.6	Waverley Road – Malvern East, Wheelers Hill	
Monash	Glen Waverley–Wheelers Hill–Mulgrave tripoint	36.3	22.6	Ferntree Gully Road (Metro Route 22) – Ripponlea, Oakleigh, Ferntree Gully to Monash Freeway (M1) – Chadstone, City	
Monash	Wheelers Hill–Mulgrave border	36.9	22.9	Monash Freeway (M1) – Dandenong, Pakenham	Outbound entrance and inbound exit only
Monash	Mulgrave	38.0	23.6	Wellington Road (Metro Route 18) – Elwood, Clayton, Rowville, Emerald	
Monash–Greater Dandenong border	Mulgrave–Springvale border	39.6	24.6	Princes Highway (Alt National Route 1) – City, Dandenong to Police Road (eastbound) – Dandenong North	Springvale Junction
Greater Dandenong	Springvale	39.7	24.7	Centre Road (Metro Route 16 west) – Brighton East; Police Road (Metro Route 16 east) – Mulgrave to Princes Highway (southeast-bound) – Dandenong	Springvale Junction
Greater Dandenong	Springvale	41.4	25.7	Pakenham and Cranbourne railway lines	
Greater Dandenong	Springvale–Springvale South border	42.9	26.7	Heatherton Road (Metro Route 14) – Heatherton, Noble Park	
Greater Dandenong–Kingston border	Springvale South–Dingley Village–Keysborough tripoint	45.3	28.1	Westall Road (Metro Route 49 west) – Clayton South; Dandenong Bypass (Metro Route 49 east) – Dandenong South	
Greater Dandenong–Kingston border	Dingley Village–Keysborough–Braeside tripoint	46.1	28.6	Lower Dandenong Road (Metro Route 10 west) – Black Rock, Mentone; Cheltenham Road (Metro Route 10 east) – Dandenong	
Greater Dandenong–Kingston border	Keysborough–Braeside–Waterways tripoint	48.4	30.1	Governor Road (Metro Route 12 west) – Mordialloc; Hutton Road (Metro Route 12 east) – Dandenong South, Narre Warren	
Greater Dandenong–Kingston border	Aspendale Gardens–Bangholme–Chelsea Heights tripoint	50.2	31.2	Mornington Peninsula Freeway (M11 west, east) – Dingley Village, Frankston, Rosebud	Southern terminus of south eastern section of highway (declared)
Greater Dandenong–Kingston border	Aspendale Gardens–Bangholme–Chelsea Heights tripoint	50.2	31.2	Springvale Road (Metro Route 40 south) – Edithvale	Metro Route 40 continues south along Springvale Road
1.000 mi = 1.609 km; 1.000 km = 0.621 mi: Concurrency terminus; Incomplete access; Route transition

== See also ==
- List of Melbourne highways
