= Warrigal Road =

Road in Melbourne, Victoria

Warrigal Road Warrigal Highway Victoria
- Coordinates: 37.826244°S 145.099933°E (North end); 37.994237°S 145.069064°E (South end)

General information
- Type: Highway
- Length: 18.9 km (12 mi)
- Route number(s): Metro Route 15 (1965–present)
- Former route number: Metro Route 14 (1989–2016) (Moorabbin–Heatherton)

Major junctions
- North end: Canterbury Road; Surrey Hills, Melbourne
- Burwood Highway; Monash Freeway; Dandenong Road; Dingley Bypass; Nepean Highway
- South end: Beach Road; Parkdale, Melbourne

Location(s)
- Major suburbs: Surrey Hills, Burwood, Ashwood, Chadstone, Oakleigh, Oakleigh South, Moorabbin, Heatherton, Cheltenham, Mentone

Highway system
- Highways in Australia; National Highway • Freeways in Australia; Highways in Victoria

Warrigal Road is a major inner urban road in southeastern Melbourne, Australia. On weekdays, it is heavily trafficked as it runs through many major suburbs along its route, traversing some of Melbourne's eastern and south-eastern suburbs. These suburbs include Chadstone, Oakleigh, and Cheltenham. The Chadstone Shopping Centre can be accessed directly from Warrigal Road at its eastern entrance.

== Route ==
Warrigal Road begins at the intersection with Canterbury Road in Surrey Hills and runs south as a four-lane, single-carriageway road with a speed limit at 60 km/h, up and down steep gradients, through the intersection with Toorak Road and Burwood Highway at Burwood (where the highway declaration starts) and continues south to the intersection with High Street Road at Ashwood, where the road widens to a six-lane, dual-carriageway road with bus lanes. Continuing south, it crosses under the Glen Waverley railway line (where the bus lanes end) and the Monash Freeway in Chadstone to the intersection with Princes Highway. Continuing south as a four-lane, single-carriageway road, it crosses over the Gippsland railway line through Oakleigh until the intersection of Old Dandenong Road, Oakleigh South, where it widens again to a six-lane, dual-carriageway road with a speed limit of 70 km/h and continues south through Heatherton until Bernard Street, where it narrows again to a four-lane, single-carriageway road and the speed limit is reduced back to 60 km/h. Continuing south, it passes through Nepean Highway in Mentone (where the highway declaration ends), where it narrows again to a dual-lane, single-carriageway road, crosses the Frankston railway line, before eventually terminating at an uncontrolled T-intersection with Beach Road in Parkdale.

Warrigal Road is aligned with the 1 mile (1.6 km) cadastral survey grid of Melbourne, and is 8 miles (13 km) east of the survey datum at Batman's Hill.

== History ==
The Country Roads Board declared Warrigal Road a Main Road in the 1937–38 financial year, from Canterbury Road in Surrey Hills to Centre Road, Oakleigh South. The bridge over Gardiners Creek at Ashwood was also replaced during this period: the old structure was demolished, and a new bridge was built on an improved alignment with the road immediately downstream of the old one. The new bridge opened on 25 October 1938, for a total cost of approximately A£4,100. It was later widened to take four lanes of traffic in 1958, using the unusual measure of cutting and jacking over to a new position of the footways and hand-rails of the existing structure, and widening the road between them; this procedure cost much less than would have been the cost of demolishing the footway and casting a new section. Construction of a bridge to replace the level crossing over the Gippsland railway line to the west of Oakleigh railway station was completed in July 1968.

Warrigal Road was signed as Metropolitan Route 15 between Surrey Hills and Parkdale in 1965. Metropolitan Route 14 previously ran concurrent along Warrigal Road from South Road at Oakleigh South to Kingston Road at Heatherton from 1989; this was removed when Metropolitan Route 14 was re-routed along Dingley Bypass when it opened in 2016.

The passing of the Transport Act 1983 (itself an evolution from the original Highways and Vehicles Act 1924) provided for the declaration of State Highways, roads two-thirds financed by the state government through the Road Construction Authority. The Warrigal Highway was declared a State Highway in December 1990, from the South Eastern Arterial at Chadstone to the Nepean Highway in Mentone, and was extended north from the South Eastern Arterial to Burwood Highway at Burwood in October 1993; the road was known (and signposted) as Warrigal Road along its entire length.

The passing of the Road Management Act 2004 granted the responsibility of overall management and development of Victoria's major arterial roads to VicRoads: in 2004, VicRoads re-declared the road as Warrigal Highway (Arterial #6070), beginning at Burwood Highway at Burwood and ending at Nepean Highway in Mentone, while re-declaring the remnants between Surrey Hills and Parkdale as Warrigal Road (Arterial #5843) The road is still presently known (and signposted) as Warrigal Road along its entire length.

== Etymology ==
The name Warrigal refers to a wild dingo in the Darug language.

== Major Intersections ==
LGA	Location	km	mi	Destinations	Notes
Boroondara–Whitehorse boundary	Surrey Hills	0	0.0	Canterbury Road (Metro Route 32) – Forest Hill, Camberwell	Northern terminus of road and Metro Route 15
Boroondara–Whitehorse boundary	Surrey Hills–Burwood boundary	1.1	0.68	Riversdale Road (Metro Route 20) – Box Hill South, Camberwell	
Boroondara–Whitehorse boundary	Camberwell–Burwood boundary	2.7	1.7	Toorak Road (Metro Route 26 west) – Kooyong, Toorak; Burwood Highway (Metro Route 26 east) – Burwood, Ferntree Gully	Northern terminus of Warrigal Highway (declared)
Boroondara–Monash boundary	Ashburton–Ashwood boundary	4.4	2.7	High Street Road (Metro Route 24) – Mount Waverley, Glen Iris	
Stonnington–Monash boundary	Malvern East–Chadstone boundary	6.1	3.8	Waverley Road	
Stonnington–Monash boundary	Malvern East–Chadstone boundary	6.4	4.0	Monash Freeway (M1) – Pakenham, City	Diamond interchange
Stonnington–Monash boundary	Malvern East–Chadstone–Oakleigh tripoint	6.8	4.2	Middle Road – Chadstone Shopping Centre	
Stonnington–Monash boundary	Malvern East–Hughesdale–Oakleigh tripoint	7.5	4.7	Dandenong Road (Alt National Route 1/Metro Route 22) – Springvale, Caulfield	
Glen Eira–Monash boundary	Bentleigh East–Hughesdale–Oakleigh–Oakleigh South quadripoint	9.4	5.8	North Road (Metro Route 18) – Mulgrave, Ormond	
Glen Eira–Monash–Kingston tripoint	Bentleigh East–Oakleigh South boundary	11	6.8	Centre Road (Metro Route 18) – Clayton, Bentleigh	
Glen Eira–Kingston boundary	Bentleigh East–Oakleigh South boundary	11.9	7.4	Old Dandenong Road – Clarinda	
Glen Eira–Kingston boundary	Bentleigh East–Moorabbin–Heatherton–Oakleigh South quadripoint	12.6	7.8	South Road (Metro Route 14 west) – Moorabbin; Dingley Bypass (Metro Routes 14/87 east) – Noble Park, Dandenong South	
Kingston	Moorabbin–Heatherton boundary	14.3	8.9	Kingston Road – Heatherton, Noble Park	
Kingston	Cheltenham	15.9	9.9	Center Dandenong Road – Cheltenham, Dingley Village	
Kingston	Mentone–Parkdale boundary	17.5	10.9	Nepean Highway (Metro Routes 3/10) – Frankston, City	Southern terminus of Warrigal Highway (declared)
Kingston	Mentone–Parkdale boundary	18.9	11.7	Beach Road (Metro Route 33) – Mordialloc, Sandringham	Southern terminus of road and Metro Route 15
1.000 mi = 1.609 km; 1.000 km = 0.621 mi: Route transition
