= Springvale Junction =

Road intersection in Melbourne, Victoria

Coordinates: 37.932732°S 145.156088°E

Springvale Junction is a road intersection in Melbourne, Victoria, Australia. It is situated on the boundary of the suburbs of Mulgrave and Springvale.

Springvale junction forms the intersection of four major roads, two of which terminate:

- Springvale Road: along with Stud Road eight kilometres to the east and Warrigal Road four kilometres to the west, Springvale Road is the busiest and most unsafe north–south thoroughfare in the eastern suburbs, with speed limits of 70 km/h and 80 km/h, and a six-lane dual carriageway.
- Princes Highway: along with the Monash Freeway, the major thoroughfare from the south-eastern suburbs into the city, running northwest-southeast. Like Springvale Road, it is a six-lane dual carriageway.
- Police Road/Centre Road: two-lane single carriageway running east–west. These roads are slightly off-set from the main intersection.

Each of the six main corners of the intersection has shops or shopping centres on it.

The lower section of Mile Creek East Branch passes below the intersection in a series of culverts maintained by VicRoads and Melbourne Water.

== Improvements ==
The shopping centres make upgrades to Springvale Junction harder to implement, with any potential grade separation of the Princes Highway needing significant land acquisitions. However, alternative thoroughfares have been built to ease the congestion on the Princes Highway, such as the Monash Freeway and EastLink. Westall Road also directs south-bound traffic from the west around Springvale Junction, and the slowest part of Springvale Road. In addition, the Dingley Arterial, which connects with the existing Westall Road, attracts Dandenong traffic away from the junction. Removal of the railway crossing at Springvale Road as part of the LXRP has also reduced delays.

== Consultation of community ==
In 2016, VicRoads consulted the community on how best to improve the intersection, with a survey conducted as to what community members would find acceptable.

Popular potential improvements (>50% of those surveyed would find it good or acceptable):

- Grade separation of the Princes Highway
- Prohibiting unsafe right turns, such as from Centre Road onto Princes Highway

Unpopular potential improvements (<50% of those surveyed would find it good or acceptable):

- Redirecting right turns with U-turns, such as the right turn from Springvale Road onto Princes Highway
- Speed limit reductions
- Installing a Roundabout
- Closing Centre Road and Police Road to the intersection
