= Dandenong Bypass =

Dandenong Bypass Victoria
- Coordinates: 37.983073°S 145.146056°E (West end); 38.005935°S 145.227903°E (East end)

General information
- Type: Highway
- Length: 8.1 km (5.0 mi)
- Opened: 2007–2012
- Route number(s): Metro Route 49 (2012–present) (through Keysborough)

Major junctions
- West end: Westall Road; Keysborough, Melbourne
- Springvale Road; EastLink; Frankston-Dandenong Road
- East end: South Gippsland Highway; Dandenong South, Melbourne

Location(s)
- Major settlements: Keysborough

Highway system
- Highways in Australia; National Highway • Freeways in Australia; Highways in Victoria

The Dandenong Bypass is a highway in the state of Victoria, Australia that runs along the Dingley Freeway reservation from Springvale Road in Keysborough to the South Gippsland Highway in Dandenong South.

== History ==
The Dandenong Bypass was completed along the alignment reserved for the Dingley Freeway corridor, staged in two separate projects over seven years. The entire bypass has a speed limit of 80 km/h with traffic light controlled intersections and overpasses at Cheltenham Road and EastLink.

Dandenong Bypass was signed as Metropolitan Route 49 between Springvale Road and EastLink through Keysborough, when the second stage of the bypass was opened in 2012.

The passing of the Road Management Act 2004 granted the responsibility of overall management and development of Victoria's major arterial roads to VicRoads: in 2007, VicRoads re-declared Dandenong Bypass (Arterial #6420) from Perry Road in Keysborough to South Gippsland Highway in Dandenong South; the declaration has since been extended to cover Stage 2 of the bypass terminating at Springvale Road in Keysborough.

=== Stage 1: Perry Road to South Gippsland Highway ===
The first stage of the bypass commenced construction in late 2005 between Perry Road and South Gippsland Highway as part of the EastLink project, with the $65 million works involving the creation of a four lane divided road with traffic light controlled access at roads which run north-south along the constructed route.

The 4.8 km bypass also included an overpass of the Cranbourne railway line as well as a diamond interchange with EastLink. The entire bypass has an 80 km/h speed limit. The project was completed and opened to traffic on 9 December 2007.

=== Stage 2: Springvale Road to Perry Road ===
The second stage of the bypass commenced construction in 2011 between Springvale Road and Perry Road, connecting the existing Dandenong Bypass at Perry Road with Westall Road and creating an arterial-standard highway, with traffic light controlled intersections and an overpass at Cheltenham Road, for 11 km from Heatherton Road in Springvale to the South Gippsland Highway.

The new section of road was expected to carry between 30,000 and 40,000 vehicles per day, and also included a shared path being constructed alongside, linking to existing shared paths along the previously-built section of the arterial. The construction of this section (at a cost of $74.6 million) was brought forward to commence in 2010 as part of the "Nation Building" initiatives in the 2009 Victorian State Budget. The project was completed early and under budget (previously estimated to cost $80 million) to traffic on 20 December 2012.

=== Stage 3: South Gippsland Highway to South Gippsland Freeway ===
The final section to be built would be an eastern section running from the current Dandenong Bypass intersection with South Gippsland Highway to South Gippsland Freeway. Such a section would be the final link to be built but it would require the construction of a freeway style interchange on the South Gippsland Freeway end. The Victorian government had agreed to start this section by 2020, although this section is still in early planning.

== Intersections ==
Dandenong Bypass is entirely contained within the City of Greater Dandenong local government area.

Location	km	mi	Destinations	Notes
Keysborough	0.0	0.0	Westall Road (Metro Route 49) – Springvale South	Western terminus of road; Metro Route 49 continues north-west as Westall Road
Keysborough	0.0	0.0	Springvale Road (Metro Route 40) – Edithvale, Springvale	
Keysborough	2.3	1.4	Chapel Road – Keysborough, Noble Park	
Keysborough	3.3	2.1	Perry Road – Keysborough, Bangholme	
Keysborough	3.9	2.4	Chandler Road – Keysborough, Noble Park	
Keysborough	4.9	3.0	EastLink (M3) – Melbourne, Ringwood, Frankston	Diamond interchange Eastern terminus of Metro Route 49 (signed)
Dandenong South	6.3	3.9	Hammond Road – Dandenong, Dandenong South	
Dandenong South	7.1	4.4	Frankston-Dandenong Road (Metro Route 9) – Frankston, Dandenong	
Dandenong South	7.9	4.9	Cranbourne railway line	
Dandenong South	8.1	5.0	South Gippsland Highway – Dandenong, Cranbourne, Phillip Island	Eastern terminus of road
1.000 mi = 1.609 km; 1.000 km = 0.621 mi: Route transition

== See also ==
- Highways in Australia
- Highways in Victoria
