= Victorian Touring Coaches =

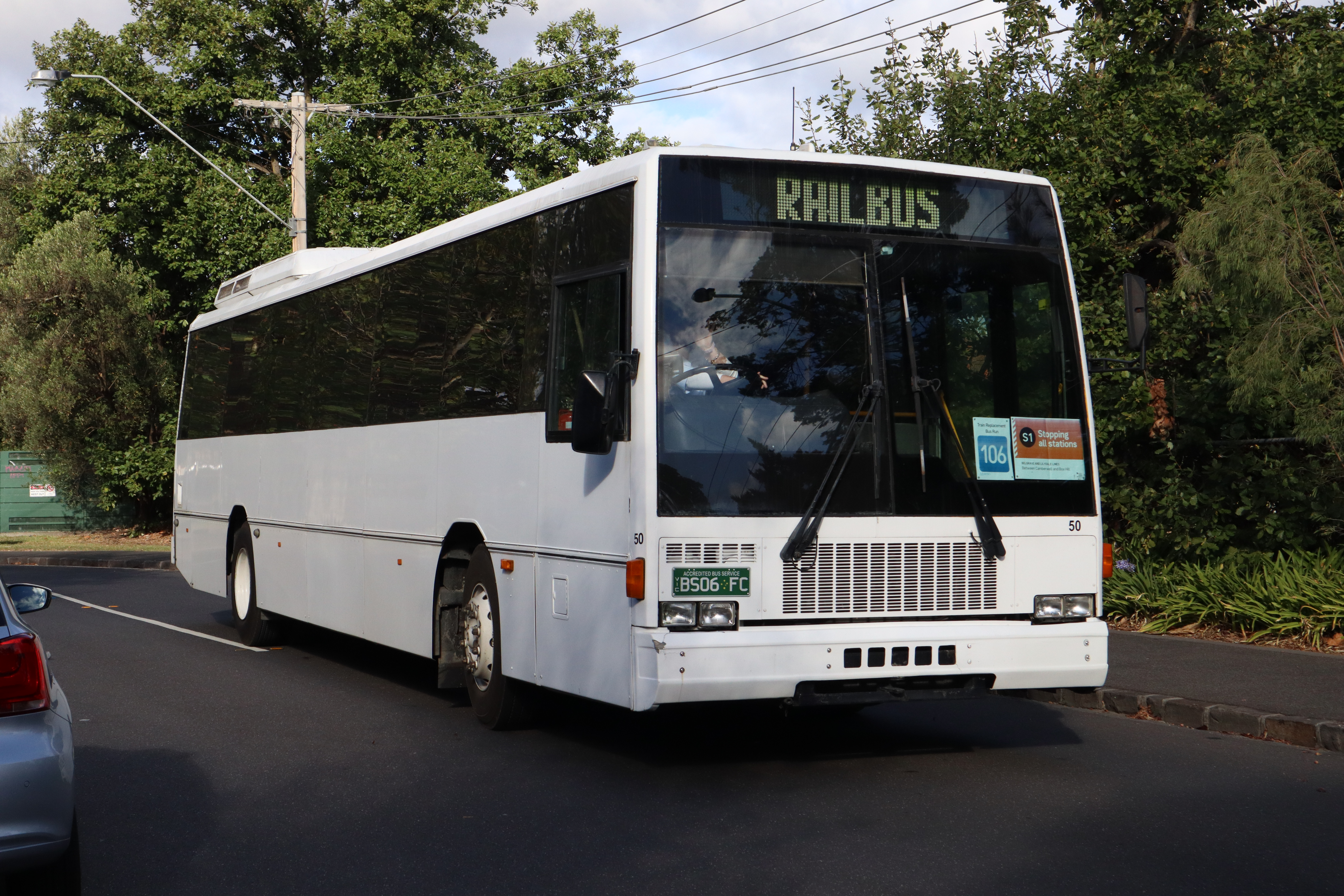
- (Now Nuline) Bus 50 Volvo B10M MkIII (Austral “Metroliner” Body) is seen operating Rail Replacement Services at Camberwell
- Parent: Nuline Charter
- Founded: 1950
- Headquarters: Moorabbin
- Locale: Melbourne
- Service type: Bus & coach operator
- Depots: 3
- Fleet: 37 (March 2020)
- Website: www.nulinecharter.com.au

Victorian Touring Coaches is a bus and coach charter operator in Melbourne, Victoria, Australia. In 2021, they were acquired by Nuline Charter

== History ==
In 1950, Bill Armstrong purchased Beauty Tourist Co from Sid Horne and renamed it SW Armstrong. The depot in Victoria Street, Brunswick. In 1965, Armstrong acquired part of Green Bus Lines of Malvern, but did not retain the Green Bus Lines names, instead continuing to trade as SW Armstrong. In 2000, the business was rebranded Victorian Touring Coaches. In 2016 the depot was relocated from Moorabbin to Springvale.And after the Nuline acquisition, they operate out of Moorabbin, Clayton and Spotswood

== Fleet ==
As at March 2020, the fleet consisted of 37 buses and coaches. The fleet livery is navy blue and white.
