= Minaret College =

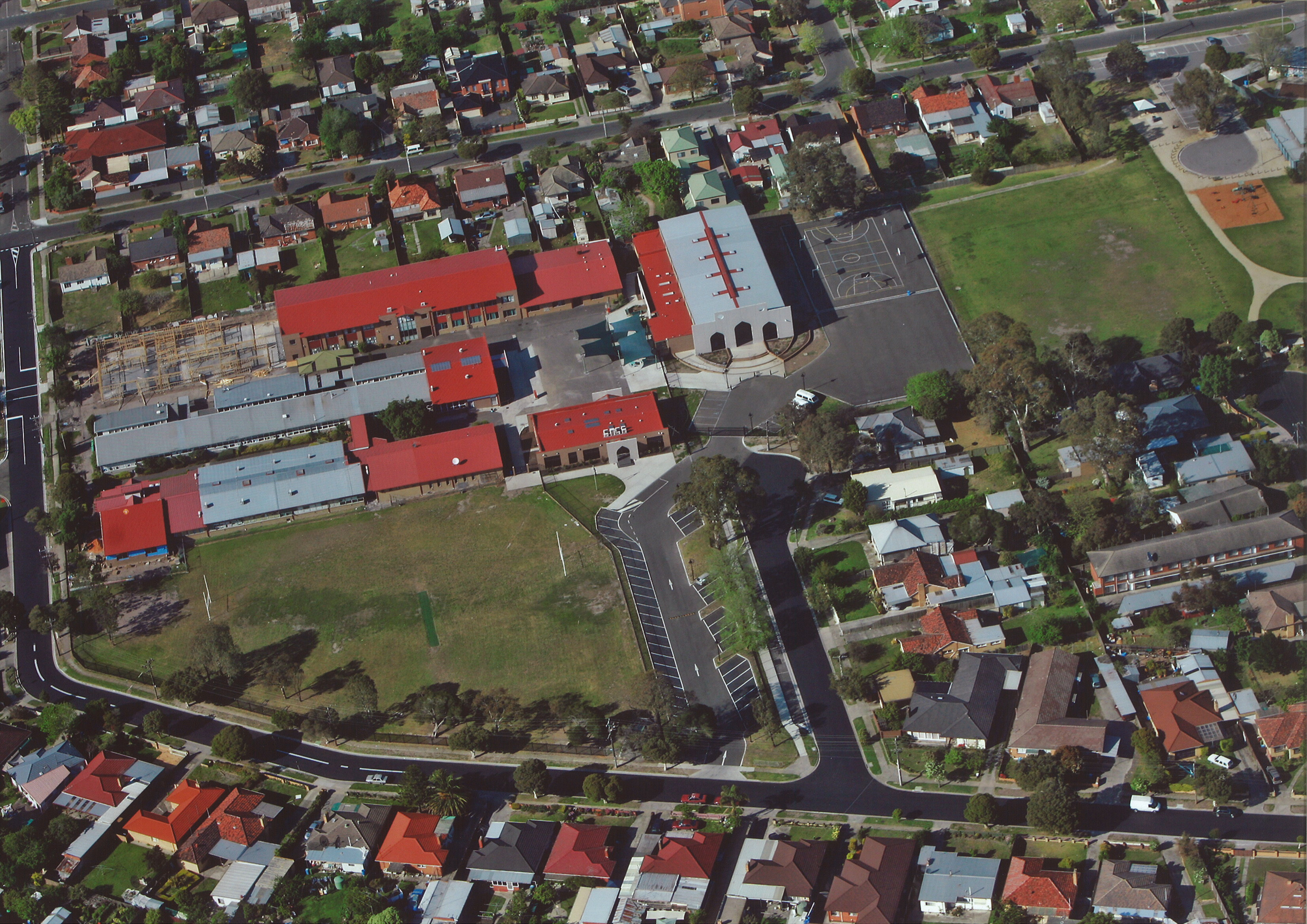
- Aerial photograph of Minaret College Springvale campus, in 2009

Location
- Springvale and Officer and Doveton, South-eastern Melbourne, Victoria; Australia; 37°56′20″S 145°08′49″E

Information
- Type: Independent co-educational
- Motto: Faith, Knowledge, Practice
- Religious affiliation: Islam
- Established: 1992; 34 years ago
- Founder: Mohamed Hassan (1931 – 7 June 2020)
- Grades: K – 12
- Campus type: Suburban
- Colors: Black; Green; Grey; White
- Teams: Usrah Houses: Aisha; Bilal; Mariam; Zaid
- Website: www.minaret.vic.edu.au

Minaret College is the largest co-educational Islamic school in south-eastern Melbourne, Victoria, Australia founded by Mohamed Hassan (1931 – 7 June 2020). It was established in 1992 with 22 students on the grounds of a Noble Park mosque. As enrolment began to climb a new campus was established in Springvale. The school established a second campus in Officer in 2009. The school established a third campus in Doveton in 2021. While the school is independent, a majority of its funding (>80%) came from the Australian and the Victorian governments.

== Curriculum ==
The curriculum consists of the standard Victorian curriculum with extra religion-related subjects. Study of the Quran and Islamic religion is mandatory for all students until VCE (Year 11 and 12). 7–9 students are also given a choice between Arabic and Islamic history, as well as Zuhr prayer being mandatory for all students. The performance of the three campuses' student is usually around the Victorian state's average, however the Springvale campus usually performs better on national standardised tests.

== See also ==
- Islam in Australia
- List of schools in Victoria
