= Neil Christopher Prakash =

Alleged senior member in the Islamic State

- Born: 7 May 1991 (age 35); Melbourne, Australia
- Other name: Abu Khaled al-Cambodi
- Citizenship: Revoked Australian citizenship in 2018
- Education: Cheltenham Secondary College
- Occupation: Former member of Islamic State
- Criminal charge: Membership in a terrorist organization
- Criminal penalty: 7.5 years in prison (reduced to 6 years on appeal)
- Criminal status: Extradited to Australia in 2022 and charged with terrorism-related offences
- Parent(s): Indo-Fijian father and Cambodian mother

Neil Christopher Prakash (born 7 May 1991), known as Abu Khaled al-Cambodi (Arabic: أبو خالد الكمبودي), is a former member of the Islamic State, whose Australian citizenship was revoked in December 2018. In April 2016, four civilians were killed in a United States air-strike targeting Prakash. In May 2016, he was reported to have been killed, but was only wounded and escaped. In November 2016, Prakash was captured in Turkey.

In March 2019, Prakash was convicted in a Turkish court of membership in a terrorist organisation and sentenced to seven and a half years in prison, reduced to six years on appeal. In early December 2022 he was extradited back to Australia, first to Darwin, then Melbourne where he was charged with terrorism-related offences.

== History ==
Prakash was born in Melbourne, Australia to an Indo-Fijian father and a Cambodian mother from the south-east suburb of Springvale South. He attended high school at Cheltenham Secondary College.

Prakash converted from Buddhism to Islam in August 2012 after a visit to Cambodia, when he was repulsed by what he viewed as Buddhism's commercialism and idolatry. He attended meetings at Al-Furqan bookstore and prayer centre in Melbourne.

On 29 December 2018, the Australian government announced it had revoked Prakash's Australian citizenship due to his links to terrorism. Although Australia maintains that he retains Fijian citizenship despite being born in Melbourne, in 2019, the Fijian government refused to allow him to go there, insisting he was not and had never been a Fijian citizen. Peter Dutton did not consult with Fiji or an expert in Fijian law before making the decision to revoke Prakash's Australian citizenship, and Fiji does not allow dual citizenship.

== Islamic State ==
He traveled to Syria via Malaysia in 2013, arriving in the ISIL-controlled city of Raqqa.

=== Arrest warrant ===
Prakash's passport was cancelled October 2014. On 19 August 2015, police obtained a warrant for his arrest. He was accused of being a member of a terrorist organisation and of incursions into a foreign state with the intention of engaging in hostile activities.

=== IS media appearances ===
Prakash appeared in a video released 21 April 2015 titled "Stories From the Land of the Living: Abū Khālid al-Kambūdī" produced by al-Hayat Media Center.

=== Reports of death ===
On 5 May 2016, Attorney-General for Australia George Brandis said US officials had confirmed Prakash was killed in Mosul, but later news reports said police and intelligence agencies believed he might still be alive. It was later discovered that Prakash had been wounded in a strike, and then escaped to Syria.

Then on 29 July 2016, the United States Central Command said four civilians had been killed in a strike targeting Prakash on 29 April 2016.

=== Capture ===
In November 2016, Prakash was captured in Turkey after he tried to cross the Syrian border into Turkey using false documents and a fake name. On 25 November 2016, Australian counter-terrorism officials confirmed that Prakash was still alive and had been arrested several weeks previously by Turkish officials in Turkey. Australia applied for his extradition on a Federal Police warrant for:

... being a member of ISIS, recruitment of others and being involved in the plotting to "massacre" crowds and behead police at an Anzac Day commemoration in Melbourne in 2015.

In May 2017, Prime Minister Malcolm Turnbull announced that Prakash was expected to be extradited from Turkey in months to stand trial in Australia.

In December 2018, Prakash was waiting on trial in Turkey on terrorism charges.

=== Conviction ===
On 16 March 2019, Prakash was convicted in a Turkish court of membership in a terrorist organisation and sentenced to seven and a half years in prison.

In early December 2022, he was extradited back to Darwin. He was then extradited to Melbourne and charged in Melbourne Magistrates' Court with six terrorism-related offences. He was charged with engaging in hostile activity in a foreign state, being a member of a terrorist organisation, and entering or remaining in a declared area. As of June 2025, he is still awaiting trial.
