= Clayton South =

- Suburb
- Interactive map of Clayton South
- Coordinates: 37.947°S 145.123°E
- Country: Australia
- State: Victoria
- City: Melbourne
- LGA: City of Kingston
- Location: 20 km (12 mi) from Melbourne

Government
  - State electorate: Clarinda
  - Federal division: Hotham

Area
  - Total: 8.3 km^{2} (3.2 sq mi)

Population
  - Total: 13,381 (SAL 2021)
- Postcode: 3169
Suburbs around Clayton South
Oakleigh South	Clayton	Mulgrave
Clarinda	Clayton South	Springvale
Heatherton	Dingley Village	Springvale South

Clayton South is a suburb in Melbourne, Victoria, Australia, 20 km south-east of Melbourne's Central Business District, located within the City of Kingston local government area. Clayton South recorded a population of 13,381 at the 2021 census.

The suburb sometimes goes by the name Westall, due to the name of the main road and the railway station that serve the area. Westall is, however, not an official name, and all post addressed to the area is addressed to Clayton South.

== History ==
Settlement of the area dates from the mid 1800s, with land used mainly for farming and market gardening.

The area was once coastal heathland and first occupied by John O'Shannessy during the early 1840s, who took a squatting licence to encompass a 40,000-acre (160 km2) block, around suburbs known today as Clarinda, Clayton South, Dingley and Heatherton. O’Shannessy later passed on his licence to John and Richard King, in 1846, which saw the transformation of the area. Some growth took place during the late 1800s and early 1900s.

The area was also used for market gardening, although there was a considerable amount of swampy or unimproved land when the Forest Hill Golf Club acquired an area for its Spring Valley golf course in 1948. The golf course is one of several in the sand belt country, extending from Huntingdale to Dingley Village. Residential settlement and industrial growth began during the late 1950s. Notable developments were the Volkswagen assembly plant adjoining the Westall railway station, and cable-making and bakery establishments. The Clayton South primary school had been opened in 1929 for the farming community, but the postwar residential growth required the opening of Westall primary and high schools in 1961 and 1963.

Clayton South Post Office opened on 15 July 1929 and closed in 1976. Westall Post Office opened in 1960 near the station and closed in 1971.

Significant development occurred from the post-war years, with rapid growth during the 1960s and 1970s. The population declined slightly between 1991 and 2006, a result of few new dwellings being added to the area and a decline in the average number of persons living in each dwelling. The population and dwelling stock then increased slightly between 2006 and 2011.

Immediately west of Clayton South is Clarinda. During 1960s to 1980s it was regarded as a locality of Clayton South, but in the late 1990s it emerged as a separate suburb. Clayton South thus sits between Springs and Westall Roads. In any event Clarinda's shopping centre serves much of Clayton South. Other shopping areas for Clayton South's residents are at Clayton, Springvale and a small neighbourhood group of shops at Westall.

The Westall UFO sighting was recorded 6 April 1966, and took place in the area.

== Transport ==
Westall Road runs north to south through Westall. There is a large bridge over the railway line. Several bus routes pass through the suburb and drop passengers off at the shops near the Westall railway station.

Bus routes also run through the area including:

- 704 - Oakleigh Station - Westall Station via Clayton. From 17 May 2020
- 705 - Mordialloc - Springvale via Braeside, Clayton South
- 821 - Southland - Clayton via Heatherton
- 824 - Moorabbin - Keysborough via Clayton, Westall

== Schools ==
- Clayton South Primary School
- St Andrew's Primary School
- Westall Primary School (Recently Upgraded)
- Westall Secondary College (In 2016 it was a VCE Top Performer in Further Maths)
- Heatherton Christian College (Clarinda)

== Industry ==
Substantial industrial facilities are located within the Clayton South Area, including the Clayton Business Park, McCormick Foods Australia, Goodman Fielder and Viridian Glass.

== Sports and Recreation ==
Various sports and recreation facilities are available:

- Badminton, snooker, pool and table tennis facilities are available to the public at Pro Fit Badminton located at 86-102 Whiteside Rd.
- Golfers play at the course of the Spring Valley Golf Club on Heatherton Road.
- The Westall Social Tennis Club offers courts for use.
- The largest pistol shooting club in Victoria, the Oakleigh Pistol Club, is located in the Deals Road Reserve west of the Spring Valley Golf Club, in between the neighbouring Oakleigh Go-Kart Motor Track and the Oakleigh Motorcycle Club.
- Other major features of the area also include Namatjira Park, The Grange Reserve, Heatherton Park and Keeley Park.
- Nearby is the Clayton Bowls Club
- The djerring trail runs adjacent to the railway line and is a popular walking and bike trail
- The Kingston City FC is based out of the Grange Reserve

== Community Facilities ==
A Westall Community Hub, completed 2018, is now offering services to the community. The facility is co-located on the Westall Primary School and Westall Secondary College site, and provides a range of services such as:

- A public library branch which has a contemporary e-focus
- Four early childhood education and care rooms (total 99 licensed places) facilitating flexible service provision
- Three maternal and child health rooms
- A number of multi-use consulting rooms
- Community / group rooms
- Offices; and waiting / reception areas

A privately run retirement village, Lexington Gardens, is located on Westall Road. It occupies the site of the former Springvale Migrant Enterprise Hostel which provided accommodation and comprehensive settlement services to more than 30,000 migrants and refugees from all over the world between 1970–1992.

== Rosebank commercial area ==
There are several shops on Rosebank Avenue, including a post office, news-agency, bakery, milk-bar, bottle shop, laundromat, bakery, and various fast food outlets (bakery, fish and chips, pizza, indian restaurant, etc).

== See also ==
- City of Moorabbin – Parts of Clayton South were previously within this former local government area.
- City of Oakleigh – Parts of Clayton South were previously within this former local government area.
