= Clarinda, Victoria =

Clarinda
- Suburb
- Interactive map of Clarinda
- Coordinates: 37.941°S 145.103°E
- Country: Australia
- State: Victoria
- City: Melbourne
- LGA: City of Kingston
- Location: 18 km (11 mi) from Melbourne

Government
  - State electorate: Clarinda
  - Federal division: Hotham

Area
  - Total: 3.7 km^{2} (1.4 sq mi)

Population
  - Total: 7,441 (SAL 2021)
- Postcode: 3169
Suburbs around Clarinda
Oakleigh South	Oakleigh South	Clayton
Oakleigh South	Clarinda	Clayton South
Heatherton	Heatherton	Dingley Village

Clarinda is a suburb in Melbourne, Victoria, Australia, 18 km south-east of Melbourne's Central Business District, located within the City of Kingston local government area. Clarinda recorded a population of 7,441 at the 2021 census.

== History ==
The area was once coastal heathland and first occupied by John O'Shannessy during the early 1840s, who took a squatting licence to encompass a 40,000-acre (160 km^{2}) block, around suburbs known today as Clarinda, Clayton South, Dingley and Heatherton. O'Shannessy later passed on his licence to John and Richard King in 1846, which saw the transformation of the area.

In May 1905, Brighton Council advised it had received an offer from the Melbourne and Metropolitan Board of Works that it was prepared to lay an extension of the Glenhuntly Road water main into Clarinda Road with the view of opening up 'little populated localities'.

In June 1905, Moorabbin Council called for estimates to form and gravel 20 chains of Clarinda Road from Bunny Road, requesting the owners in the meantime to clear off 'furze'.

The 6 July 1907 edition of the Brighton Southern Cross newspaper carried an advertisement from a florist named Curtis seeking an employee to work in Clarinda Road, Bald Hills, Clayton.

The area was originally called Bald Hills but because there were many places of the same name, it was changed to Bayview then later Clarinda.

The Moorabbin Council voted to support the construction of Clarinda Road at a meeting in April 1908. It noted it was the only through road between Heatherton and Bald Hills. It was proposed to source gravel for the project from nearby Robertson's Estate. Ratepayers had agreed to work valued at £30 and had already undertaken preparatory work themselves. In July the council agreed with an engineer's report recommending Clarinda Road be gravelled for a distance of four chains, and concurred the area should then be 'left alone for a little while'.

Clarinda Post Office opened on 13 September 1911 and closed in 1971. When the suburb was developed it reopened in 1984.

Clarinda is now a multicultural suburb with existing communities from the Philippines, India, Greece, Cambodia, Sri Lanka and Vietnam.

== Education ==
- Clarinda Primary School
- St. Andrew's Catholic Primary School
- Christway College Kingston

== Facilities ==
- Bao Minh Temple, a Vietnamese Buddhist temple on Kingston Road.

== Transport ==
- Clarinda is accessible by a number of PTV bus routes servicing the area.

== See also ==
- City of Moorabbin – Parts of Clarinda were previously within this former local government area.
- City of Oakleigh – Parts of Clarinda were previously within this former local government area.
