= Springvale, Victoria =

Springvale Monite
- Suburb
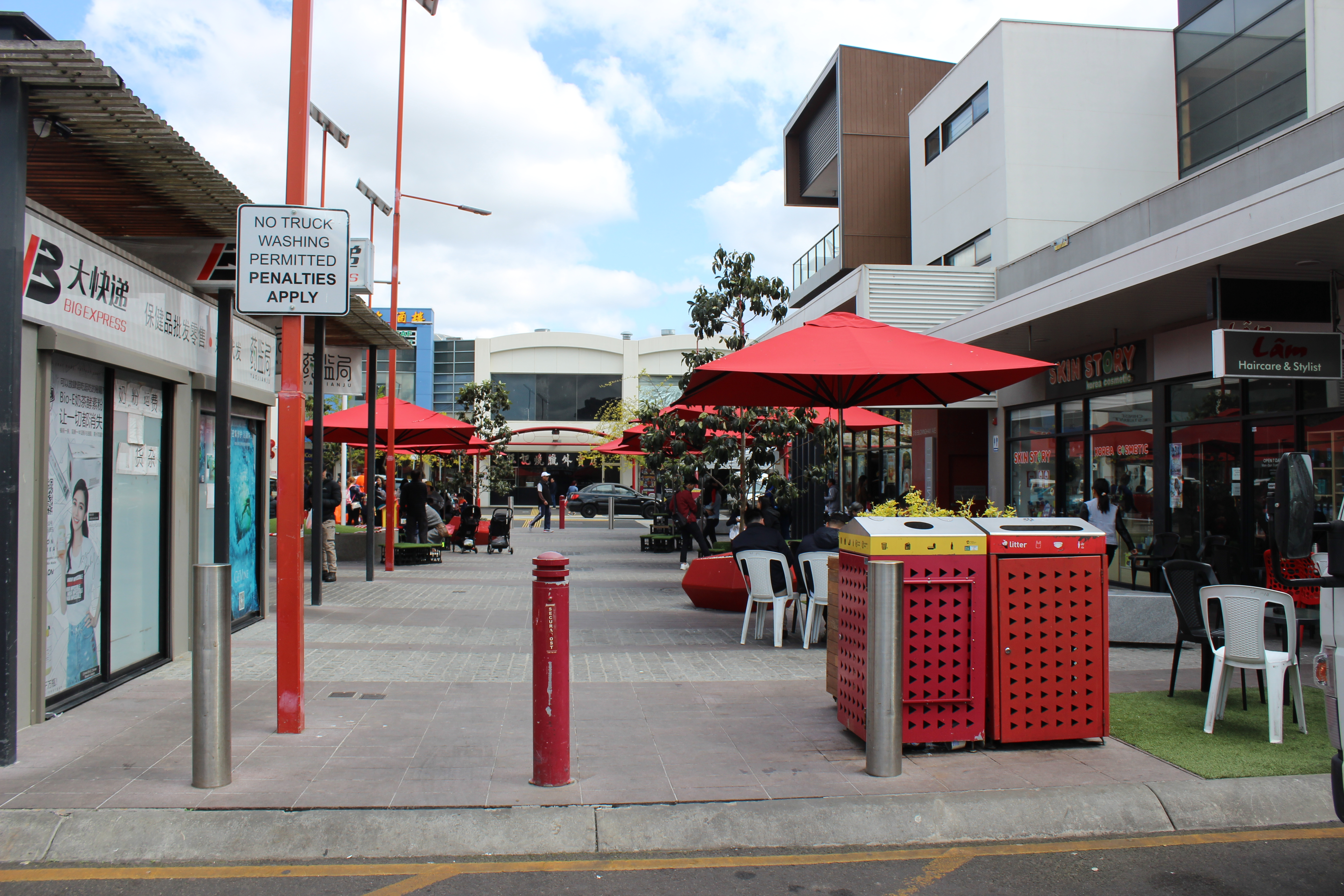
- Pedestrian mall in Springvale

- Interactive map of Springvale
- Coordinates: 37.947°S 145.153°E
- Country: Australia
- State: Victoria
- City: Melbourne
- LGA: City of Greater Dandenong
- Location: 22 km (14 mi) from Melbourne; 8 km (5.0 mi) from Dandenong
- Established: 1880s

Government
  - State electorate: Mulgrave
  - Federal division: Hotham

Area
  - Total: 11.2 km^{2} (4.3 sq mi)

Population
  - Total: 22,174 (2021 census)
  - Density: 1,980/km^{2} (5,128/sq mi)
- Postcode: 3171
Suburbs around Springvale
Clayton
Clayton South	Springvale	Noble Park North
Dingley Village	Springvale South	Noble Park

Springvale (Boonwurrung: Monite) is a suburb in Melbourne, Victoria, Australia, 22 km (14 mi) south-east of Melbourne's Central Business District, located within the City of Greater Dandenong local government area. Springvale recorded a population of 22,174 at the 2021 census.

Springvale is a large suburb occupying 11.2 km^{2} (4.3 sq mi), bounded by Westall Road to the west, Princes Highway and Police Road to the north, the Springvale Crematorium and Corrigan Road to the northeast, Heatherton Road to the south and Lawn Road to the southeast. Springvale is linked to the Melbourne CBD by Monash Freeway via the Ferntree Gully Road exit to the suburb's northwest.

== History ==
The area that is now Springvale has been inhabited by the Woiwurrung and Boonwurrung people for tens of thousands of years.

The area contained natural springs which were a permanent water source for stock and travellers moving between Melbourne and Dandenong, giving rise to the suburb's name.

In the 1840s, Springvale was the residence of Christian Ludolph Johannes De Villiers; a South-African leader of the Native Police. De Villiers founded an inn 'No-Good-Damper' in the area which was infamous for bushranger attacks. No-Good-Damper was named for the practice of locals killing Aboriginal people by lacing sacks of flour with poison; some Aboriginal people chose to steal flour for food as settlers displaced them from their hunting grounds.

In the 1850s, a Spring Vale Hotel was built by Matthew Bergin near a newly surveyed route between Oakleigh and Dandenong at what is now the intersection of Princes Highway and Springvale Road. However, it did not develop into a settlement. Nearby, a blacksmith shop and a rest house for travellers was established by the Young Family.

The first Springvale Post Office opened on 12 September 1864 and closed in 1892. This office had been superseded by Springvale Railway Station office (opened 1887) which was renamed Springvale in 1902. A Springvale North Post Office was also open between 1946 and 1978.

In 1886, land was subdivided near the railway station and the area began to grow. By the 1920s, the Spring Vale community had a lodge, brass band, a recreation reserve, a mechanics' institute, a few shops and some houses in the township. A picture theatre opened in 1924. At the outbreak of the Second World War, Springvale was a pastoral, residential and industrial township with market gardens in the surrounding areas. Sand extraction industries were active, lasting until the 1990s.

The clearest indication of postwar residential growth occurred in the early 1960s when Rockman's Shopwell department store was built, and later when shops on the east side of Springvale Road were removed for road widening. Housing growth was rapid and estates with made roads and services replaced unserviced subdivisions. The new Sandown Racecourse site was opened in 1961 for both horse and motor-car racing.

During the 1970s and 1980s, many Vietnamese people moved to Springvale as a result of displacement during the events in the Vietnam War. Today, they make up the largest ethnic group in the area and Springvale is renowned for its Vietnamese shops, markets, and community. Nonetheless, Springvale is one of the most diverse suburbs in Australia.

Springvale was once a city in its own right but in December 1994, parts of the former municipality were amalgamated into the City of Greater Dandenong, the City of Frankston and the City of Kingston.

== Geography ==
On the north of the Princes Highway is the Springvale Crematorium and Necropolis. Next to the Crematorium is an area of housing and the original Springvale primary school near where Centre and Springvale Roads cross Princes Highway.

The suburb is mostly residential, although some small industrial areas are scattered through the suburb's northwest and northeast. Eastern Springvale contains Springvale Crematorium and Necropolis, one of Melbourne's three main cemeteries, and the Sandown motor raceway.

== Demographics ==
The residents of this suburb have higher levels of migrant settlement, cultural diversity and more limited English proficiency than Greater Dandenong, lower median incomes and lower rates of early school-leaving. As of the 2011 Census, 69% of Springvale residents were born overseas, higher than for Greater Dandenong and more than double the corresponding metropolitan proportion (33%). Among the 99 birthplaces of its residents were Vietnam (21%), India (11%), Cambodia (5%) and China (5%). Rates of migrant settlement are relatively high, with 8% of residents having arrived in Australia within the previous 2.5 years – similar to the figure for Greater Dandenong, of 7%.

Languages other than English are spoken by 79% of Springvale residents – compared with 64% for Greater Dandenong. 22% have limited fluency in the use of spoken English, higher than the municipal level of 14% and over five times the metropolitan level of 4%. Among the major religious faiths are Buddhism, adhered to by 27.3% of residents, and Catholicism (21%).

9% of young adults (20–24 years) had left school before completing year 11 – lower than both the municipal average of 13% and the metropolitan level, of 10%.

Median individual gross incomes of $352 p.w., recorded in the 2016 Census, were the lowest in Greater Dandenong and equivalent to 55% of metropolitan levels.

Of the 6,489 homes in Springvale recorded in 2016, 16% are apartments, less than the proportion across Greater Dandenong of 21%, though more than the metropolitan level of 11%. 61% of homes in 2016 were owned or being purchased by their occupants – less than the metropolitan level of 71%.

== Politics ==
The suburb of Springvale has long been a stronghold of the Australian Labor Party at both federal and state elections.

At the federal level the suburb is in the federal Division of Hotham, currently held by Clare O'Neil of the Labor Party.

At the state level, Springvale is in the Electoral district of Mulgrave (Victoria), held by Victorian Labor MP Eden Foster.

As of 2025, Springvale is split across the Springvale North and Springvale Central Wards of the City of Greater Dandenong.

== Facilities ==
Springvale Neighbourhood House was established in 1983 with the aim of providing a resource centre for self-help, social, cultural and action groups. Over 40 self-help groups meet at the house, including ESL, Computer and Horticulture classes and celebrations such as Refugee Week, Sumnation and Adult Learners Week.

There are many large religious centres in Springvale including several Buddhist temples, Christian churches and a Greek Orthodox church.

== Transport ==
=== Trains ===
Springvale has two suburban railway stations, both located on the Pakenham/Cranbourne line of the Melbourne rail network:

- Springvale railway station, in the suburb's centre, servicing the shopping district around Springvale Road.
- Sandown Park railway station, in the suburb's southeast, servicing the Sandown Racecourse/Raceway and the Sandown Park Greyhound Racing Track.

=== Buses ===
Several bus routes also run through the suburb, including:

- Ventura Bus Route 705 to Mordialloc.
- Ventura Bus Route 811 to Dandenong railway station and Brighton.
- Ventura Bus Route 813 to Dandenong railway station and Waverley Gardens Shopping Centre.
- Ventura Bus Route 814 to Dandenong railway station and Springvale South (Spring Valley Park).
- Ventura Bus Route 885 to Glen Waverley railway station.
- SmartBus Route 902 to Westfield Airport West shopping centre and Chelsea railway station.

== Education ==
=== Primary schools ===
St Joseph's Primary School Springvale Rise Primary School

=== Secondary schools ===
Minaret College, Springvale campus

Killiester college

== Sport ==
Springvale has a local Australian rules football team, the Springvale District Football Club, competing in the Southern Football League.

South Springvale SC compete in the Victorian State League Division 1 and play their home games at Warner Reserve.

Sandown International Raceway incorporates a motor racing track with permanent pit and grandstand facilities. It hosts a number of major car races every year including the Sandown 500, a key event in the V8 Supercar series, and formerly the Sandown Challenge. The raceway is accessible by cars from the Princes Highway and within walking distance from the Sandown Park railway station. The Sandown Racecourse is co-located with the motor raceway, and is one of the four horse racing venues in Melbourne. On the other (southwestern) side of the Pakenham-Cranbourne line railway is the Sandown Park Greyhound Racing Track, one of the most (if not the most) prestigious greyhound racing venue in Victoria and Australia, and hosts the prominent events such as the TAB Melbourne Cup.

The Victorian branch of the Sporting Shooters Association of Australia (SSAA) operates the SSAA Springvale Range – the only handgun/rifle shooting range in metropolitan Melbourne that is open daily to non-licensed members of the general public, located on the north side of the Princes Highway just west of the Springvale Botanical Cemetery. The range consists of two 50 m (55 yd) outdoor rifle ranges (though only one is regularly available) that allow only air rifles and .22 LR rimfire rifles, as well as one 10 m (11 yd) indoor airgun range and four 25 m (27 yd) handgun ranges. It is one of the main shooting sport and police training facilities in Victoria, and also hosts the separately administered Sporting Shooters Pistol Club (SSPC), the state's second largest handgun club (after the Oakleigh Pistol Club in Clayton South).

== Landmarks and notable places ==
Springvale Botanical Cemetery is the largest facility of its kind in Victoria.

== Notable residents ==
- Kenny Athiu – Professional soccer player, currently playing at Sri Pahang F.C, and formerly a player for Melbourne Victory.
- Members of the Australian alternative band TISM originated from the suburb.
- Neil Prakash – Former member of the Islamic State group, whose Australian citizenship was revoked in December 2018.

== See also ==
- City of Springvale – Springvale was previously within this former local government area.
