= Heatherton, Victoria =

Heatherton Melbourne, Victoria
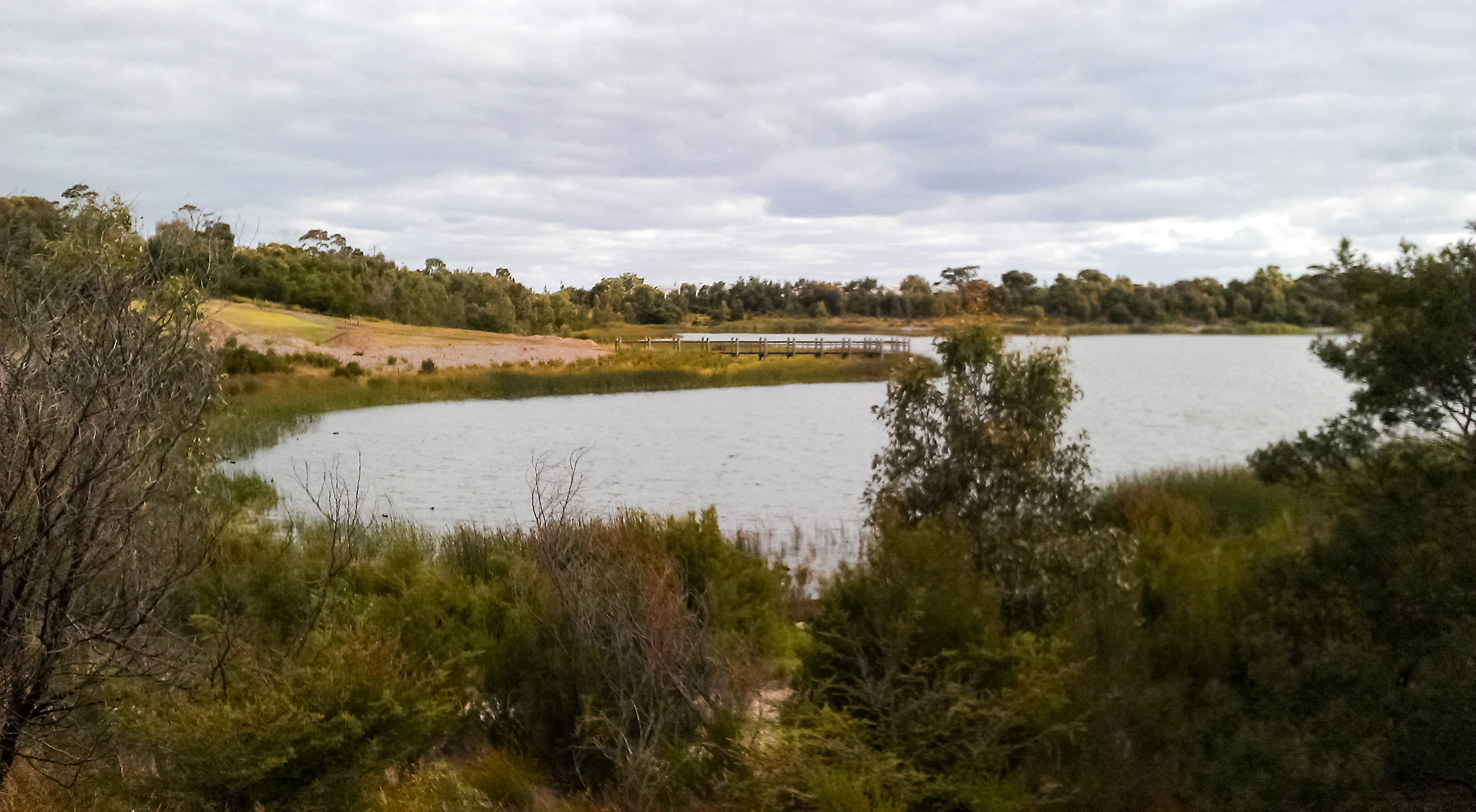
- Karkarook Park at Heatherton Victoria

- Coordinates: 37.95°S 145.085°E
- Population: 2,826 (SAL 2021)
- Postcode(s): 3202
- Area: 7 km^{2} (2.7 sq mi)
- Location: 19 km (12 mi) from Melbourne
- LGA(s): City of Kingston
- State electorate(s): Clarinda
- Federal division(s): Isaacs
Suburbs around Heatherton:
Moorabbin	Oakleigh South	Clarinda
Cheltenham	Heatherton
Cheltenham	Moorabbin Airport	Dingley Village

Heatherton is a suburb in Melbourne, Victoria, Australia, 19 km south-east of Melbourne's Central Business District, located within the City of Kingston local government area. Heatherton recorded a population of 2,826 at the 2021 census.

The suburb has a low population for a metropolitan suburb. It is predominantly open space: market garden, golf courses (the Kingston Heath Golf Club and the Capital Golf Club) and the large Karkarook Park.

== History ==
As part of the Melbourne Sandbelt, the area has been subject to significant sand mining in the past, though many extraction sites have now passed to other uses. Heatherton Post Office opened on 6 May 1885, but closed in 1973.

== Today ==
The Kingston Centre, a major regional Aged Care and Rehabilitation facility, is located on Warrigal Road. The site was originally the Melbourne Benevolent Asylum (where construction began in 1909). A 2 ft (610 mm) narrow gauge tramway was constructed from the railway at Cheltenham to the building site. A large proportion of the grounds of the Kingston Centre were sold in the 1990s to the developer Mirvac, who built the 500 homes of the Heath estate between 2000 and 2009.

== Population ==
In the 2016 Census, there were 2,907 people in Heatherton. 56.8% of people were born in Australia. The next most common countries of birth were China 5.0% and England 3.5%. 63.3% of people spoke only English at home. Other languages spoken at home included Mandarin at 4.9%. The most common responses for religion were No Religion 31.7% and Catholic 23.2%.

== Sport ==
The suburb has an Australian Rules football team competing in the Southern Football League. The Heatherton Football Club ("The Tunners") was formed in 1913 and currently play at the Heatherton Recreation Reserve on Ross Street.

Golfers play at the course of the Kingston Heath Golf Club on Kingston Road or at the Capital Golf Club on Ross Street.

== See also ==
- City of Moorabbin – Heatherton was previously within this former local government area.
