= Dingley Village =

- Suburb
- Interactive map of Dingley Village
- Coordinates: 37.981°S 145.128°E
- Country: Australia
- State: Victoria
- City: Melbourne
- LGA: City of Kingston
- Location: 23 km (14 mi) from Melbourne
- Established: 1920s

Government
  - State electorate: Clarinda
  - Federal division: Isaacs

Area
  - Total: 7.9 km^{2} (3.1 sq mi)

Population
  - Total: 10,495 (2021 census)
  - Density: 1,328/km^{2} (3,441/sq mi)
- Postcode: 3172
Suburbs around Dingley Village
Clarinda	Clayton South	Springvale
Moorabbin Airport	Dingley Village	Springvale South
Mordialloc	Braeside	Keysborough

Dingley Village is a suburb in Melbourne, Victoria, Australia, 23 km south-east of Melbourne's Central Business District, located within the City of Kingston local government area. Dingley Village recorded a population of 10,495 at the 2021 census.

== History ==
Dingley was the original name before being renamed to Dingley Village in 1991.

In 1856, Thomas Attenborough bought land in the area and named his house Dingley Grange, after Dingley Hall in Dingley in his native Northamptonshire, England. A farming community developed, relatively remote from either the bayside or Gippsland railway lines, moving into market gardens and poultry to supply metropolitan markets. There was no identifiable centre to the area apart from Christ Church (1873) at the corner of Centre and Old Dandenong Roads. The post office opened on 21 July 1913.

A family of five brothers – the Gartside – solved the problem of vegetable gluts by opening a cannery around 1920. The cannery employed up to 50 local people. The Gartside brothers donated land for the primary school which opened in 1925. In 1936 the Kingswood Golf Club, Dandenong, opened its new course in Dingley. A progress association was formed in 1947 and a recreation reserve acquired in 1954.

Urbanisation in Dingley began in the early 1960s. A small shopping centre, school, kindergarten, reserve and, later, Sunday markets on the reserve created a village atmosphere which resulted in the official change of name.

Two more primary schools, one Catholic, opened later, along with the Spring Park Public Golf course and nearby tennis courts complex. Near the Moorabbin Airport is an industrial zone set in a garden landscape, separated from the Dingley Village residential area by the Mornington Peninsula Freeway.

Dingley Village became part of the municipality of the City of Kingston on 15 December 1994.

It is located by the City of Kingston's green wedge and is bordered to its south by Braeside Park.

The rock band Jet originated from the suburb.

== Education ==
=== Primary schools ===
- Dingley Primary School, established in 1925 and located on the corner of Centre Dandenong and Marcus roads
- Kingswood Primary School established in 1976
- St Mark's Primary School is a Catholic primary school within the Archdiocese of Melbourne

== Community facilities ==
=== Community facilities ===
- Dingley Village Men's Shed
- Dingley Village Historical Society
- Dingley Village Neighbourhood Centre
- Dingley Goodlife
- Equest Park Equestrian Centre
- Kennedy Community Centre
- Peninsula Kingswood Country Golf Club
- Southern Golf Club
- Souter and Corrigan Oval
- Spring Park Public Golf Course and Dingley Village Adventure Golf

=== Sporting clubs ===
- Dingley Baseball Club
- Dingley (Dingoes) Football Club competing in the Southern Football League.
- Maroons Netball Club
- Dingley Netball Club
- Dingley Tennis Club
- Dingley Cricket Club

=== Churches ===
- Heatherton-Dingley Uniting Church ("The Little White Church on the Corner")

Christ Church Dingley

- Christ Church Dingley
- Destiny Church Melbourne
- The Salvation Army – Kingston Gardens
- Village Church
- St Mark's Catholic Church

== See also ==
- City of Springvale – Dingley Village was previously within this former local government area.
