= Springvale South =

Springvale South Melbourne, Victoria
- Coordinates: 37.977°S 145.157°E
- Population: 12,766 (2021 census)
  - Density: 2,775/km^{2} (7,190/sq mi)
- Postcode(s): 3172
- Area: 4.6 km^{2} (1.8 sq mi)
- Location: 24 km (15 mi) from Melbourne; 7 km (4 mi) from Dandenong
- LGA(s): City of Greater Dandenong
- State electorate(s): Clarinda
- Federal division(s): Isaacs
Suburbs around Springvale South:
Clayton South	Springvale
Dingley Village	Springvale South	Noble Park
	Keysborough

Springvale South is a suburb in Melbourne, Victoria, Australia, 24 km south-east of Melbourne's Central Business District, located within the City of Greater Dandenong local government area. Springvale South recorded a population of 12,766 at the 2021 census.

== History ==
Springvale South Post Office opened on 4 November 1926.

== Population and Social Conditions ==
At the 2016 census, Springvale South had a population of 12,768. The residents of this suburb have lower levels of migrant settlement, incomes and early school leaving than Greater Dandenong and a high proportion of Buddhist residents.

At the 2011 census, Springvale South had population of 12,184. It found that 59% of residents were born overseas, similar to Greater Dandenong (60%) and substantially more than the metropolitan level of 33%. Among the 88 birthplaces of its residents were Vietnam (18%), Cambodia (12%), India (4%) and China (2%). Rates of migrant settlement are relatively low, with 4% of residents having arrived in Australia within the previous 2.5 years – little more than half the corresponding figure for Greater Dandenong, of 7%.

Languages other than English are spoken by 71% of residents – compared with 64% for Greater Dandenong. Twenty per cent of Springvale South residents have limited fluency in the use of spoken English, more than the municipal level of 14% and five times the metropolitan level, of 4%. Among the major religious faiths are Buddhism, adhered to by 38% of residents, Islam (3%) and Hinduism (2%).

Nine per cent of young adults (20–24 years) had left school before completing year 11 – lower than either the municipal average of 13% and the metropolitan level, of 10% Median individual gross incomes of $376 p.w., recorded in the Census, are among lowest in Greater Dandenong and about two-thirds (64%) of metropolitan levels.

== Education ==
There are three public primary schools in Springvale South:

- Athol Road Primary School
- Spring Parks Primary School
- Heatherhill Primary School

The two secondary schools, Heatherhill Secondary College and Coomoora Secondary College, have been merged with Springvale Secondary College and Chandler Secondary College into Keysborough Secondary College.

== Religious buildings ==
Springvale Road south of the Springvale commercial area has a concentration of religious buildings of different faiths:

- The Church of Jesus Christ of Latter-day Saints Braeside Stake Centre
- Spanish Seventh Day Adventist
- Bright Moon Buddhist Society
- Cambodian Buddhist Temple
- New Apostolic Church
- Khmer Buddhist Centre
- Vietnamese Buddhist centre

== Sport ==
Heatherton United play soccer and compete in the Victorian State League Division 2

== Transport ==
There are four buses operated by Ventura Bus Lines that service the Springvale South vicinity.

== See also ==
- City of Springvale – Springvale South was previously within this former local government area.
