= Moorabbin, Victoria =

Moorabbin
- Suburb
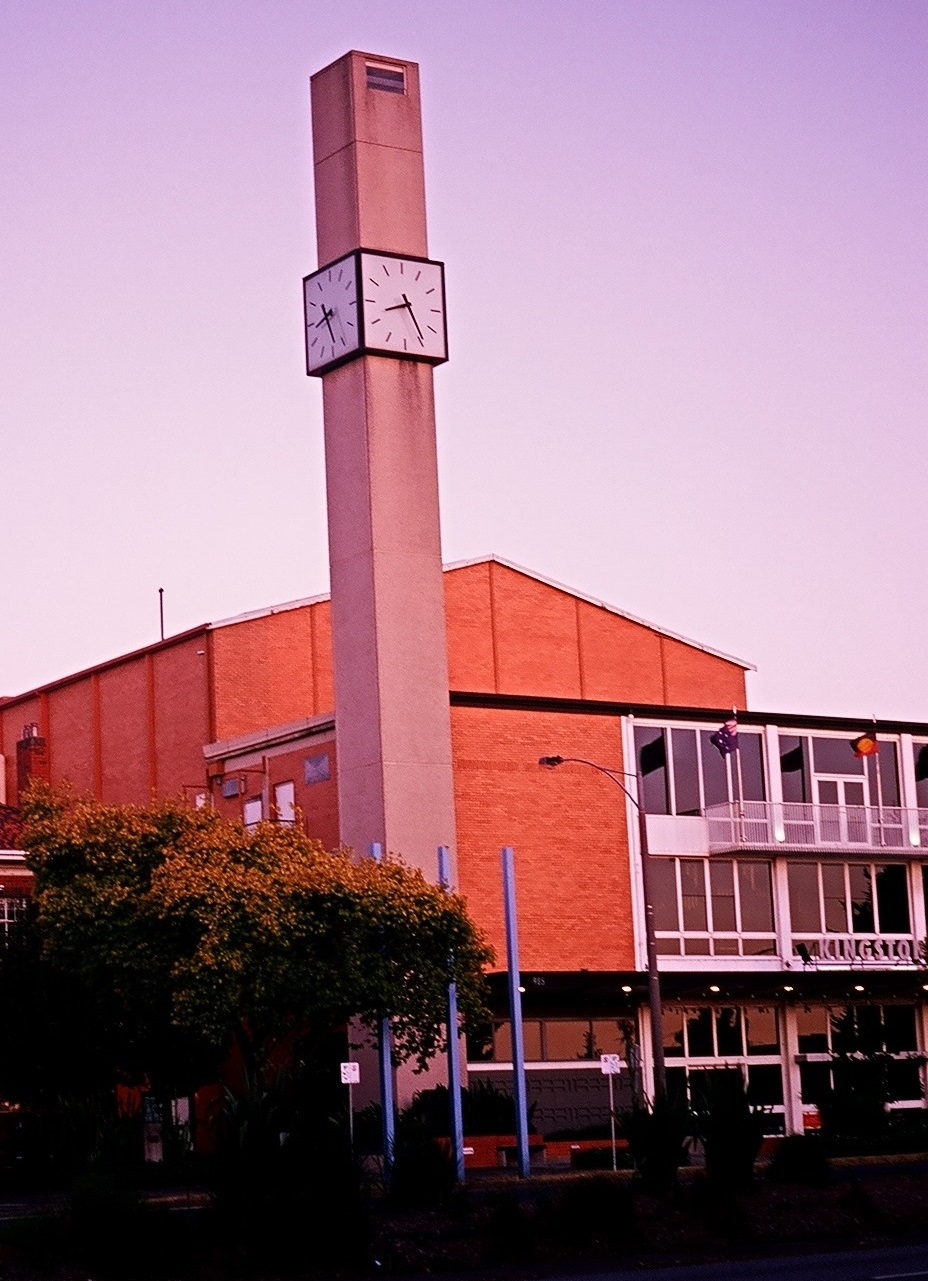
- Moorabbin Town Hall in 2024

- Interactive map of Moorabbin
- Coordinates: 37.941°S 145.058°E
- Country: Australia
- State: Victoria
- City: Melbourne
- LGA: City of Kingston
- Location: 15 km (9.3 mi) from Melbourne

Government
  - State electorate: Bentleigh
  - Federal divisions: Goldstein; Isaacs

Area
  - Total: 4.6 km^{2} (1.8 sq mi)
- Elevation: 37 m (121 ft)

Population
  - Total: 6,287 (SAL 2021)
- Postcode: 3189
Suburbs around Moorabbin
Bentleigh	Bentleigh East	Oakleigh South
Hampton East	Moorabbin	Heatherton
Sandringham	Highett	Cheltenham

Moorabbin is a suburb in Melbourne, Victoria, Australia, 15 km south-east of Melbourne's Central Business District, located within the City of Kingston local government area. Moorabbin recorded a population of 6,287 at the 2021 census.

Most of the eastern side of Moorabbin has been an industrial area since the first development in the mid-1960s. Major businesses with a presence in the area include Coca-Cola. Moorabbin is also well known locally for its residential area built after World War II.

== History ==
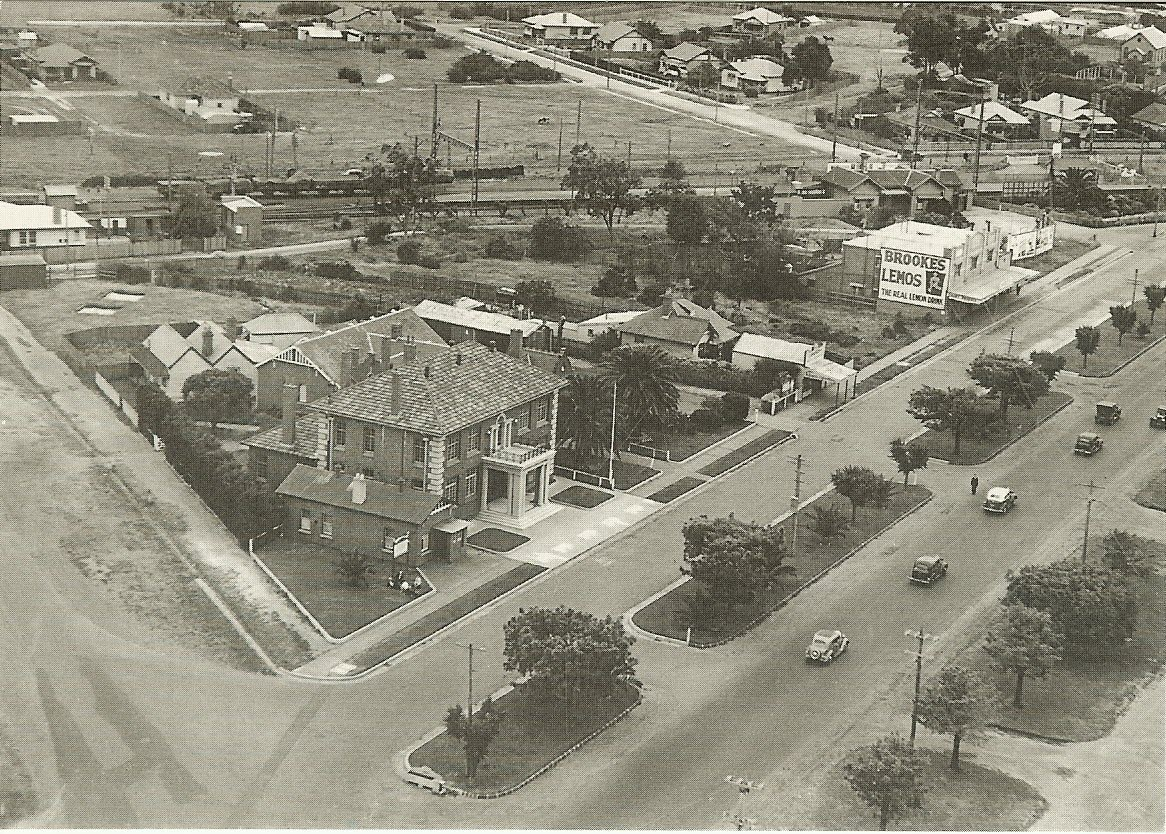
Moorabbin in 1930

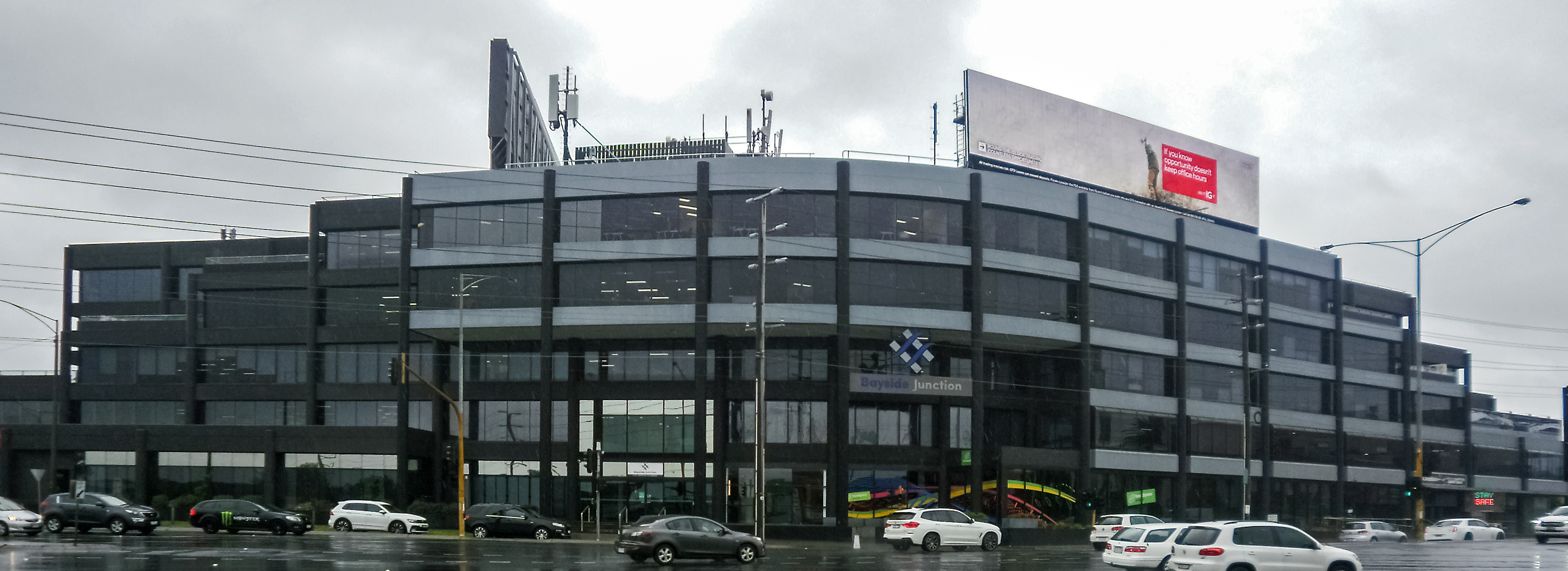
Physiology Building Moorabbin

The word Moorabbin is believed to have come from the Aboriginal word moorooboon meaning mother's milk, as it was purportedly a place where women and children stayed and rested while the men hunted further afield.

In 1846, the first European settlers arrived, brothers John and Richard King, who are thought to have come from the Western Port area.

The Post Office opened on 1 September 1857 as South Brighton, was renamed Brighton South around 1886 and Moorabbin in 1909. The Moorabbin East Post Office near Chesterville Road opened in 1960.

The seat of local government moved from Moorabbin to Cheltenham when the former City of Moorabbin was incorporated into the larger City of Kingston.

In August 1998, Moorabbin was the scene of the Silk–Miller police murders.

== Transport ==
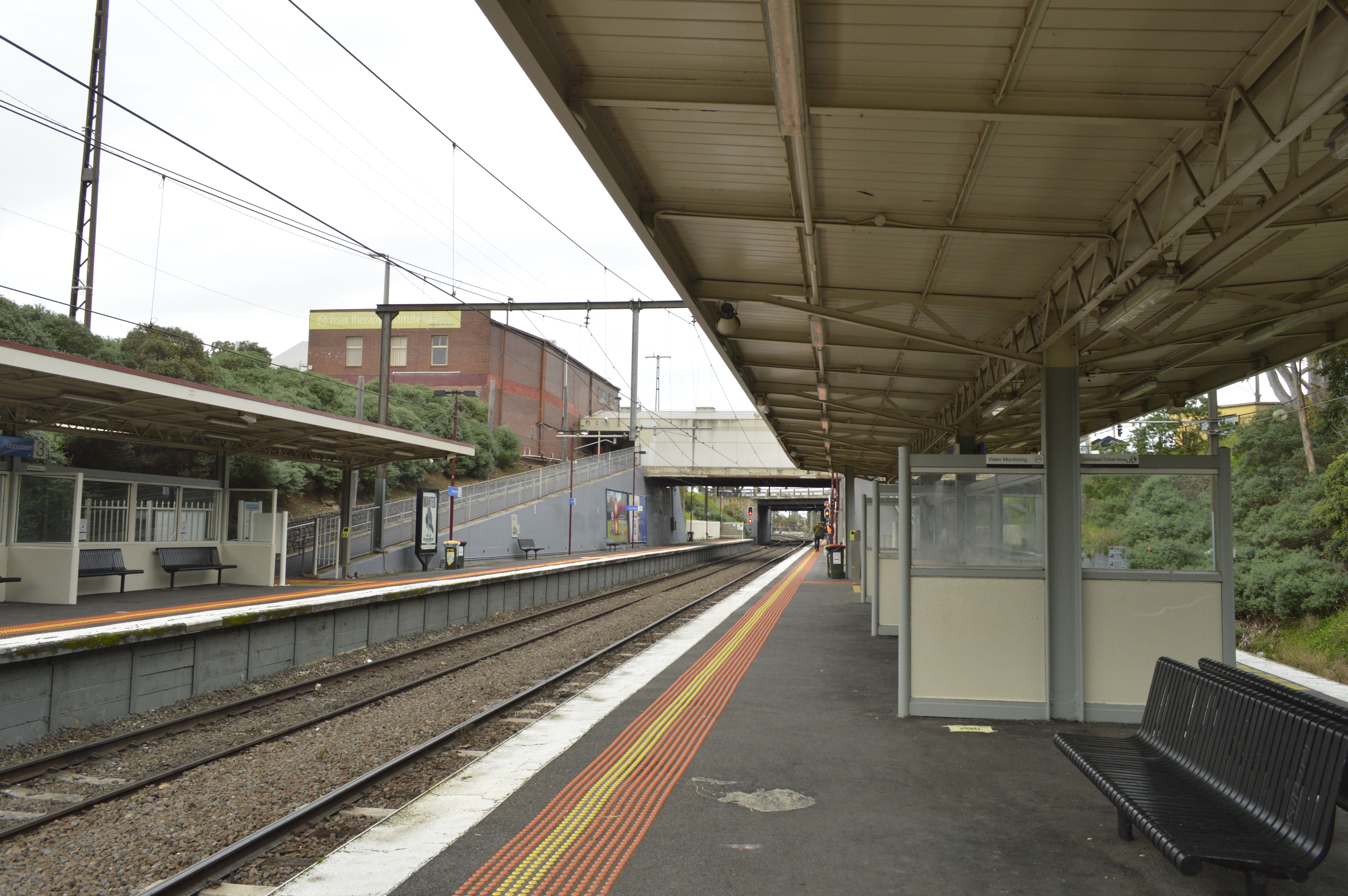
Moorabbin train station

While by name Moorabbin would appear to be home to the regional general airport Moorabbin Airport, the airport, also called the Harry Hawker Airport, is its own suburb, sharing the postcode of 3194 with Mentone. Moorabbin is serviced by a variety of Public Transport Victoria bus and train services including Moorabbin station.

== Housing ==
Housing in Moorabbin comprises mainly 3-bedroom red or cream brick detached houses built between the 1940s and 1970s. More recently villa units and townhouses have been built.

== Notable places in Moorabbin ==
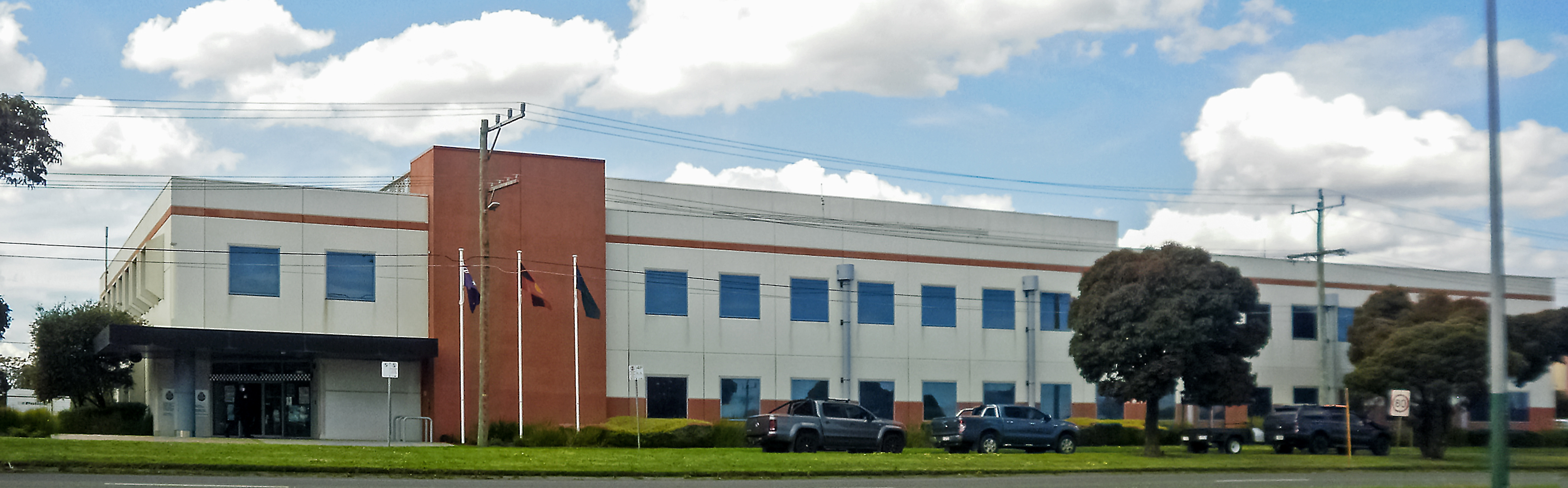
Moorabbin Police Station

The Moorabbin Campus of the Holmesglen Institute of TAFE is located in Moorabbin, the campus formerly belonging to the Chisholm Institute and before that was the location of Moorabbin Technical College. Moorabbin has two public primary schools (Moorabbin Primary, Southmoor Primary) and one Catholic primary (St. Catherine's Primary).

Moorabbin High School closed in 1984 but the former campus is now being used by the Bayside Special Development School, which provides individual programs for children with special needs. The Gould League also uses the former Moorabbin High School site and specialises in education that relates to the environment and sustainability.

== Sport ==
The suburb has an Australian Rules football team, Moorabbin Kangaroos Football Club, competing in the Southern Football League.

The football and cricket venue in the suburb is Moorabbin Oval, located in Linton Street. The ground was used by the St Kilda Football Club in VFL/AFL games between 1965 and 1992, and continued to serve as its training and administrative home ground until 2010. From 2018 the ground has again become the training, entertainment, member and community base for the Saints.

The former Australian Touring Car Championship team Perkins Engineering was based at Moorabbin Airport.

== Notable people ==
- Sir Thomas Bent, politician and land speculator
- Bernard Evans, architect
- Elizee de Garis, farmer and shire councillor
- Harry Hawker, aviator
- William Highett, banker and politician
- Mortification (Band)
- Nick Staikos, politician

== See also ==
- City of Moorabbin – Moorabbin was previously within this former local government area.
