= Noble Park, Victoria =

Noble Park
- Suburb
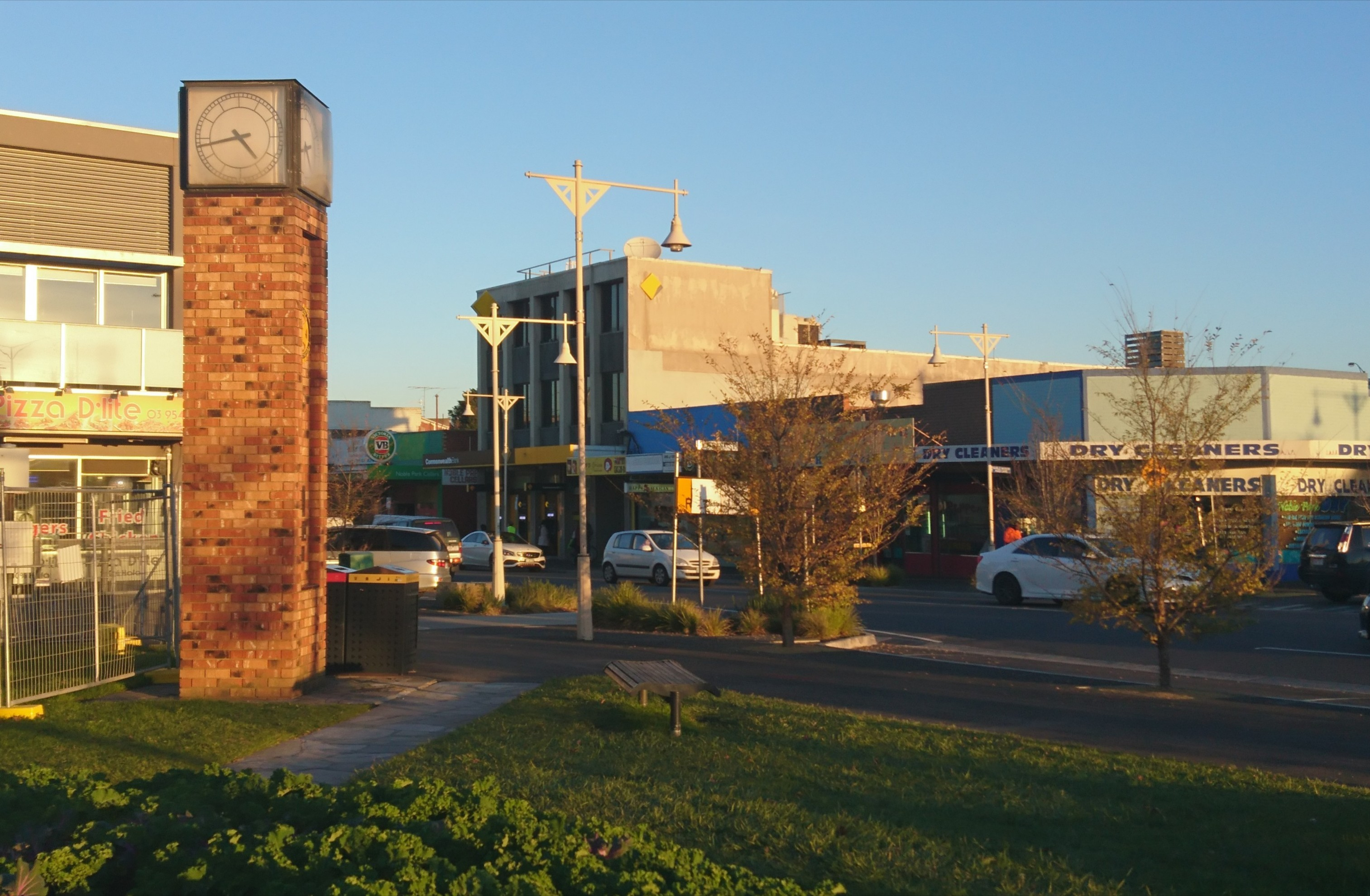

- Interactive map of Noble Park
- Coordinates: 37.967°S 145.176°E
- Country: Australia
- State: Victoria
- City: Melbourne
- LGA: City of Greater Dandenong
- Location: 25 km (16 mi) from Melbourne; 4 km (2.5 mi) from Dandenong
- Established: 1909

Government
  - State electorates: Clarinda; Dandenong; Mulgrave
  - Federal divisions: Hotham; Isaacs

Area
  - Total: 12.4 km^{2} (4.8 sq mi)

Population
  - Total: 32,257 (2021 census)
  - Density: 2,601/km^{2} (6,738/sq mi)
- Postcode: 3174
Suburbs around Noble Park
Springvale	Noble Park North	Dandenong North
Springvale South	Noble Park	Dandenong
	Keysborough

Noble Park is a suburb of Melbourne, Victoria, Australia, located 25 km (16 mi) southeast of the Melbourne central business district. It is part of the administrative area of the City of Greater Dandenong local government area (LGA), and recorded a population of 32,257 at the 2021 census.

Noble Park has a mixture of residential, commercial and industrial zones and is home to a highly multicultural population, with residents who have emigrated from Europe, Asia, the Americas and Africa.

== History ==
The history of Noble Park as a suburb in Melbourne began in 1909. Allan Buckley nicknamed the land subdivision "Nobel Park" after the Swedish inventor Alfred Nobel, as Buckley had used the estate to demonstrate Nobel's explosives, but the name was soon transformed to Noble Park by common usage.

Early settlement was encouraged by building a community centre, church, school, postal centre and later, a railway station. The postal centre was opened in August 1910 and the railway station was completed in July 1912, but in the early days, the town's growth was relatively slow due to the lack of population growth in the area. In the early 1920s, the Railway Department set up a poultry farm and eventually a plant nursery was set up in the eastern part of the suburb. The focus of the small community was based around its local town hall.

In the 1980s Noble Park became known for its infamous street gangs that carried out violent crimes against the community, as well as the scene of a major shootout between members of the Victoria Police and Pavel Marinof, a burglar on the run. Residential growth in the second half of the century saw an end to the grazing paddocks and market gardens. By the 1990s, 56% of Noble Park's population was born overseas, with the largest being from Great Britain and Ireland, followed by Bosnians, Italians and Greeks; and South and Southeast Asians (including Indians, Sri Lankans and Vietnamese), according to the Australian Bureau of Statistics.

In recent years there has been an upsurge of migrants and refugees settled from North African countries, especially Sudan. In 2007, Sudanese Australian Liep Gony was murdered in Noble Park by two white men, one of whom had previously expressed the desire to kill a black man. The murder sparked a media and political storm about so-called African gangs.

=== Today ===
Recent years have witnessed substantial investment by local and state governments, including the Paddy O'Donoghue Community Complex which opened in 2006, the redevelopment of Noble Park Railway Station and the construction of the Aquatic Centre which is home to Melbourne's largest water slide. Public amenities include number of schools, as well as churches, temples and mosques. Noble Park's primary commercial district contains bakeries, cafés, restaurants and convenience stores. Noble Park has an active Rotary Club and an active Rotaract Club.

Being formerly market gardens, Noble Park has fertile soil and to this day still has many river red gum trees.

== Demographics ==
The suburb is characterised by similar social conditions to those across Greater Dandenong, including high levels of migrant settlement and cultural diversity, relatively low incomes, elevated rates of early school leaving, low-medium crime rates and a high density of apartments. The 2011 Census recorded that 60% of Noble Park residents were born overseas, the same as for Greater Dandenong and nearly twice the corresponding metropolitan percentage (33%). Among the 121 birthplaces of residents were India, accounting for 9% of residents, Vietnam (8%) as well as others such as Sri Lanka, Cambodia, China, Bosnia, Afghanistan and Sudan.

Rates of migrant settlement are correspondingly high, with 7% of residents having arrived in Australia within the previous 2.5 years – the same as for Greater Dandenong. Languages other than English are spoken by about three-fifths of residents (61%) – twice the metropolitan average. Reflecting this diversity of languages, 13% of Noble Park residents have limited fluency in the use of spoken English, much the same as for the municipality, and over three times the metropolitan level of 4%. Patterns of religious faith are similar to those seen across the municipality, with 18% of residents adhering to Buddhism, 4% following Hinduism, and 9% Islam.

Contemporary educational outcomes are marked by a high rate of early school leaving, with 13% of young adults (20–24 years) having left school before completing year 11 – equivalent to the municipal average, but higher than the metropolitan level, of 10% Median individual gross incomes, recorded in the Census, stood at 68% of the metropolitan median - similar to municipal levels, which are the lowest in metropolitan Melbourne.

Among the 10,200 homes in Noble Park, a third are apartments - twice the proportion of metropolitan Melbourne. Sixty per cent of homes in the suburb are owned or being purchased by their occupants - less than the corresponding metropolitan level of 71%.

== Transport ==
=== Public transport ===
==== Trains ====
Noble Park has two suburban railway stations on the Pakenham/Cranbourne line of the Melbourne rail network:

- Noble Park railway station at the town centre, servicing the shopping strips alongside Douglas Street.
- Yarraman railway station at the suburb's southeastern neighbourhoods (also unofficially known as "Noble Park East"), just west of the EastLink overbridge.

==== Buses ====
Noble Park is serviced by three bus services operated by Ventura Bus Lines:

- Route 709, to Mordialloc.
- Route 811, to Dandenong railway station and Brighton.
- Route 815, to Dandenong railway station.

There are also six other bus routes that traverses parts of the suburb, including:

- Route 800, on Princes Highway to Dandenong railway station and Chadstone Shopping Centre.
- Route 812, to Dandenong railway station and Brighton.
- Route 813, to Dandenong railway station and Waverley Gardens Shopping Centre.
- Route 824, to Keysborough and Moorabbin railway station.
- Route 978 Night Bus, night service on Princes Highway from Dandenong railway station to Elsternwick railway station.
- Route 979 Night Bus, night service on Heatherton Road from Dandenong railway station to Elsternwick railway station.

=== Bicycle trails ===
The Djerring Trail (Caulfield–Dandenong Rail Trail), completed in 2018, is connected to the Noble Park railway station, as well as to Noble Park's skate park and aquatic centre.

The EastLink Trail, after crossing the Princes Highway, closely follows the Yarraman Creek and crosses the Pakenham/Cranbourne line railway via the Yarraman station footbridge, before continuing on along the Mile Creek after the two creeks join each other.

== Community facilities ==
- Noble Park Public Hall, located on Buckley Street just off the shopping strip.
- Giac Hoang Temple, a Vietnamese Buddhist temple, is located in the suburb.

== Environment ==
- The middle-lower section of the Miles Creek, a second-order right-bank tributary of the lower Dandenong Creek system and the last before the latter becomes the Patterson River, flows obliquely through the centre of Noble Park just north of the town center. Majority of the creek within Noble Park is concrete-lined and its value is mostly hydrological (as a flood control channel) rather than ecological, except in its very last section east of Chandler Road.
  - The Yarraman Creek, a small urban stream flowing south from Noble Park North and the only tributary of the Miles Creek, forms the suburb's eastern boundary with the neighbouring Dandenong West. The creek, though small and often partly dry, has two groups of retention ponds along its course and is surrounded by linear parks and forested open space reserves, providing most of the ecological functions of the Miles Creek catchment. The Yarraman railway station servicing Noble Park East is named after this creek.
- Noble Park has fertile soil and to this day still has many river red gum trees, including the oldest river red gum at Parkfield Reserve, which is classified by the National Trust of Australia.

== Sport ==
The Noble Park Aquatic Centre, located just northwest of the town centre and the train station, is home to Melbourne's largest water slide. A former swimming pool of the Aquatic Centre, just off Heatherton Road, was converted into the Noble Park Skatepark.

Noble Park has a local Australian rules football team, the Noble Park Bulls, competing in the Eastern Football League. It also includes a cricket and lawn bowls club.

Noble Park is represented by Southern Stars FC soccer team. The team currently competes in the Victorian State League Division 1 which is the third tier in Australia behind the A-League and the Victorian Premier League.

Noble Park is also home to the Parkfield Netball Club, Noble Park United FC - Drina, and Parkfield Cricket Club.

Both Noble Park Tennis Club and Noble Park Community Tennis Club represent Noble Park in tennis.

Noble Park home to the Noble Park Skate Park located on Memorial Drive (off Heatherton Road). The skate park was designed and built by a team led by Noble Park resident and pro skater John McGrath. It is a unique skate park in Melbourne's south east and includes a plaza, snake-run and bowl. It is adjacent the Noble Park Aquatic Centre to the west on Memorial Drive, which currently has a 50 m (55 yd) heated outdoor pool, an indoor heated pool, a water slide and a water play area. The 50 m outdoor pool is partially shaded and provides ramp access, and is occasionally converted into two 25 m pools.

== Notable residents ==
- Glenn Archer, Australian rules football
- John Farnham, Australian singer, actor and songwriter
- James Gwilt, Australian rules football
- Darren Millane, Australian rules football
- Stephen Milne, Australian rules football
- Adam Ramanauskas, Australian rules football player
- Adam Treloar, Australian rules footballer

== See also ==
- City of Dandenong – Parts of Noble Park were previously within this former local government area.
- City of Springvale – Parts of Noble Park were previously within this former local government area.
