= List of road routes in Victoria (numeric) =

Road routes in Victoria assist drivers navigating roads throughout the state, as roads may change names several times between destinations, or have a second local name in addition to a primary name. Victoria currently uses two route numbering schemes: the older, numerical shield-based system (which this article focuses on); and a newer, alphanumeric system, slowly replacing the older system.

Victoria implemented the federally-issued National Routes system between 1954 and 1955, using white-and-black shields highlighting interstate links between major regional centres; some of these routes were later upgraded into National Highways using green-and-gold shields when the National Roads Act was passed in 1974.

The original route numbering scheme, now known as the Metropolitan Route Numbering Scheme, allocated blue-and-white shields across Melbourne as metropolitan routes, numbered to fit around existing National Routes; this system received a major refurbishment in the late 1980s, with the creation of Tourist Routes as a result. Freeway Routes were spun off from this system between 1970 and 1987, and it was extended into a system covering rural Victoria as the State Route Numbering Scheme in 1985.

The Statewide Route Numbering Scheme, introduced in late 1996, has effectively replaced the previous scheme across regional Victoria, and is progressively replacing routes across Melbourne. It consists of alphanumeric routes, a one-to-three digit number prefixed with a letter (M, A, B, or C) that denotes the grade and importance of the road, and is now the state's default road route numbering system.

Some routes, in part or in their entirety, may have been made obsolete by the alphanumeric designation: these replacement routes are noted but not listed in full here. Some also may follow older alignments or routes later changed even after the new system was introduced, and are included here for the sake of completion. Roads are described in either a west–east or north–south alignment.

For a list of major highways and freeways in Melbourne, see List of highways in Melbourne and List of freeways in Victoria.

== National Routes ==
National Routes were the first type of route numbering to be attempted in Australia on a large scale, signed with a white shield and black writing (similar in shape to the shield that appears on the Australian coat of arms), with Victoria receiving routes in 1954. They highlighted the interstate links connecting major population, industrial and principal regions of Victoria to the rest of the Australia, in a way that was readily identifiable to interstate travellers. The system was prepared by COSRA (Conference of State Road Authorities), held between 1953 and 1954: once each state road authority agreed to the scheme, it was rolled out federally.

In 1954, the Hume Highway was trialled as National Route 31, chosen due to its prominence as a transport corridor connecting Australia's largest cities (Melbourne and Sydney). Soon after, other National Routes across the state were allocated. Selected routes were later upgraded into National Highways when the National Roads Act was passed in 1974.

Victoria's National Routes were eventually replaced with the Statewide Route Numbering Scheme, introduced in stages across the state beginning in late 1996: each route was converted to an alphanumeric route number, rendering the black-and-white shield redundant. Most National Routes in rural Victoria kept their number during the conversion; an exception was National Route 16, which became B400. Most routes were replaced in 1997 - unless otherwise stated in the table below - with the last of Victoria's routes, National Route 79, finally eliminated in 2013 (although a vestige of Alternative National Route 1 still exists through southeastern Melbourne).

Route	Component roads	From	Via	To	Length	Notes
National Route 1	Princes Highway (west)	Vic/SA border	Portland; Warrnambool; Colac; Geelong; Werribee; Laverton; South Melbourne; Chadstone; Dandenong; Pakenham; Warragul; Morwell; Sale; Bairnsdale	Vic/NSW border	955 km (593 mi)	Replaced by / (later by between Waurn Ponds and Corio when Geelong Ring Road opened in 2009)
National Route 1	Princes Freeway (west); West Gate Freeway	Vic/SA border	Portland; Warrnambool; Colac; Geelong; Werribee; Laverton; South Melbourne; Chadstone; Dandenong; Pakenham; Warragul; Morwell; Sale; Bairnsdale	Vic/NSW border	955 km (593 mi)	– re-aligned through southeastern Melbourne from Kings Way, St Kilda Road, and Wellington Street to Queens Road/Queens Way when St Kilda Junction reconstruction was completed in 1969 – re-aligned through western Melbourne from Geelong and Ballarat Roads, Smithfield and Racecourse Roads, Flemington Road, Harker and Curzon Streets, King Street (replaced by) to West Gate Freeway, Roger and Lorimer and Claredon Streets when the West Gate Bridge opened in 1978 – re-aligned through South Melbourne from Rogers and Lorimer and Claredon Streets, Market/York Streets to West Gate Freeway when its extension opened in 1988 – re-aligned through southeastern Melbourne from Kings Way, Queens Road/Queens Way, and Princes Highway (replaced by) to Sturt/Power Streets, City Road, Alexandra Avenue, Swan Street, Batman Avenue, and South Eastern Arterial when the South Eastern Arterial link opened in 1988 – replaced by
National Route 1	Sturt Street; Power Street; City Road; Alexandra Avenue; Swan Street	Vic/SA border	Portland; Warrnambool; Colac; Geelong; Werribee; Laverton; South Melbourne; Chadstone; Dandenong; Pakenham; Warragul; Morwell; Sale; Bairnsdale	Vic/NSW border	955 km (593 mi)	Replaced by, later removed when Burnley Tunnel opened in 2000, Swan Street renamed Olympic Boulevard in 2006
National Route 1	Batman Avenue	Vic/SA border	Portland; Warrnambool; Colac; Geelong; Werribee; Laverton; South Melbourne; Chadstone; Dandenong; Pakenham; Warragul; Morwell; Sale; Bairnsdale	Vic/NSW border	955 km (593 mi)	Replaced by, later by as part of CityLink (Southern link) in 1999, then removed when Burnley Tunnel opened in 2000
National Route 1	South Eastern Freeway (I)	Vic/SA border	Portland; Warrnambool; Colac; Geelong; Werribee; Laverton; South Melbourne; Chadstone; Dandenong; Pakenham; Warragul; Morwell; Sale; Bairnsdale	Vic/NSW border	955 km (593 mi)	Replaced by, later by as part of CityLink (Southern link) in 1999
National Route 1	South Eastern Freeway (II)	Vic/SA border	Portland; Warrnambool; Colac; Geelong; Werribee; Laverton; South Melbourne; Chadstone; Dandenong; Pakenham; Warragul; Morwell; Sale; Bairnsdale	Vic/NSW border	955 km (593 mi)	Replaced by, renamed Monash Freeway in 1999
National Route 1	South Gippsland Freeway	Vic/SA border	Portland; Warrnambool; Colac; Geelong; Werribee; Laverton; South Melbourne; Chadstone; Dandenong; Pakenham; Warragul; Morwell; Sale; Bairnsdale	Vic/NSW border	955 km (593 mi)	Replaced by, later by when Hallam bypass opened in 2003, then in 2025
National Route 1	Princes Highway (I)	Vic/SA border	Portland; Warrnambool; Colac; Geelong; Werribee; Laverton; South Melbourne; Chadstone; Dandenong; Pakenham; Warragul; Morwell; Sale; Bairnsdale	Vic/NSW border	955 km (593 mi)	Replaced by, later by when Hallam bypass opened in 2003
National Route 1	Princes Freeway (east) (I)	Vic/SA border	Portland; Warrnambool; Colac; Geelong; Werribee; Laverton; South Melbourne; Chadstone; Dandenong; Pakenham; Warragul; Morwell; Sale; Bairnsdale	Vic/NSW border	955 km (593 mi)	Replaced by
National Route 1	Princes Highway (II)	Vic/SA border	Portland; Warrnambool; Colac; Geelong; Werribee; Laverton; South Melbourne; Chadstone; Dandenong; Pakenham; Warragul; Morwell; Sale; Bairnsdale	Vic/NSW border	955 km (593 mi)	Replaced by, later by when Pakenham bypass opened in 2007
National Route 1	Princes Freeway (east) (II)	Vic/SA border	Portland; Warrnambool; Colac; Geelong; Werribee; Laverton; South Melbourne; Chadstone; Dandenong; Pakenham; Warragul; Morwell; Sale; Bairnsdale	Vic/NSW border	955 km (593 mi)	Replaced by
National Route 1	Princes Highway (east)	Vic/SA border	Portland; Warrnambool; Colac; Geelong; Werribee; Laverton; South Melbourne; Chadstone; Dandenong; Pakenham; Warragul; Morwell; Sale; Bairnsdale	Vic/NSW border	955 km (593 mi)	Replaced by /
Alternate National Route 1	Woolsthorpe–Heywood Road; Ettrick–Tyrendarra Road	Heywood	Homerton	Tyrendarra	22 km (14 mi)	Portland bypass route, replaced by: from Heywood to Homerton; from Heywood to Tyrendarra
Alternate National Route 1	Geelong Road; Ballarat Road; Smithfield Road; Racecourse Road; Flemington Road; Harker Street; Curzon Street; King Street	Brooklyn	Footscray; Flemington; Parkville; Melbourne	Southbank	17 km (11 mi)	– replaced when the West Gate Bridge opened in 1978 – replaced by along Geelong and Ballarat Roads, Smithfield and Racecourse Roads; along Flemington Road, Harker and Curzon and King Streets when West Gate Freeway extension opened in 1988
Alternate National Route 1	Kings Way; Queens Road/Queens Way; Dandenong Road; Lonsdale Street; Princes Highway	Southbank	St Kilda; Caulfield; Oakleigh; Mulgrave; Dandenong	Berwick	50 km (31 mi)	– replaced when South Eastern Arterial opened in 1988 along current alignment to Eumemmering – eastern end extended along Princes Highway from Eumemmering to Berwick (replacing) when Hallam bypass opened in 2003
National Route 8	Western Highway; Western Freeway; Ballarat Road; Smithfield Road; Racecourse Road; Flemington Road	Vic/SA border	Horsham; Ararat; Ballarat; Bacchus Marsh; Melton; Deer Park; Footscray; Flemington	Parkville	440 km (273 mi)	Progressively reallocated along Western Freeway sections as they opened, replaced by in 1974
National Route 12	Mallee Highway	Vic/SA border	Ouyen; Manangatang; Piangil	Vic/NSW border	233 km (145 mi)	– eastern end of route extended from Ouyen to Piangil in 1990 – replaced by
National Route 16	Murray Valley Highway	Vic/NSW border	Robinvale; Swan Hill; Kerang; Echuca; Yarrawonga; Wodonga; Corryong	Vic/NSW border	663 km (412 mi)	– western end of route re-aligned from Hattah–Robinvale Road terminating in Hattah, to current alignment in late 20th century – replaced by – NSW section still allocated as until 2013 – was partly still mistakenly signed as in Wodonga until about 2018
National Route 20	Sturt Highway	Vic/SA border	Mildura	Vic/NSW border	117 km (73 mi)	Replaced by in 1992
National Route 23	Cann Valley Highway	Cann River		Vic/NSW border	48 km (30 mi)	Replaced by, renamed Monaro Highway in 1996
National Route 31	Hume Freeway; Hume Highway; Sydney Road; Royal Parade	Vic/NSW border	Wodonga; Wangaratta; Benalla; Seymour; Craigieburn; Coburg; Brunswick	Parkville	301 km (187 mi)	Progressively reallocated along Hume Freeway sections as they opened, replaced by in 1974
National Route 39	Goulburn Valley Highway	Seymour	Nagambie; Shepparton; Strathmerton	Vic/NSW border	165 km (103 mi)	Replaced by in 1992
Alternative National Route 39	River Road; Moores Road; Doyles Road; Grahamvale Road	Kialla West	Shepparton	Congupna	19 km (12 mi)	Shepparton bypass route, replaced by
National Route 75	Northern Highway	Wallan	Kilmore; Heathcote; Elmore; Echuca	Vic/NSW border	165 km (103 mi)	– southern end extended from Kilmore to Wallan (along former alignment) in 1976 when Kilmore bypass opened – replaced by
National Route 79	Calder Highway	Vic/NSW border	Mildura; Ouyen; Charlton; Bendigo; Kyneton; Diggers Rest; Keilor; Essendon; Parkville	Southbank	565 km (351 mi)	Replaced by
National Route 79	Calder Freeway	Vic/NSW border	Mildura; Ouyen; Charlton; Bendigo; Kyneton; Diggers Rest; Keilor; Essendon; Parkville	Southbank	565 km (351 mi)	Progressively reallocated along Calder Freeway sections as they opened, replaced by
National Route 79	Tullamarine Freeway	Vic/NSW border	Mildura; Ouyen; Charlton; Bendigo; Kyneton; Diggers Rest; Keilor; Essendon; Parkville	Southbank	565 km (351 mi)	– re-aligned between Niddrie and Flemington from Keilor and Mount Alexander roads (replaced by) to current allocation when Tullamarine Freeway opened in 1970 – allocation removed in 2013, not replaced
National Route 79	Flemington Road; Harker Street; Curzon Street; King Street	Vic/NSW border	Mildura; Ouyen; Charlton; Bendigo; Kyneton; Diggers Rest; Keilor; Essendon; Parkville	Southbank	565 km (351 mi)	– southern end of route extended from Parkville through the city to Southbank (along former alignment) when West Gate Freeway extension opened in 1988 – replaced by in 2013
Alternate National Route 79	Calder Alternative Highway	Marong	Lockwood	Ravenswood	20 km (12 mi)	Bendigo bypass route, replaced by
Alternate National Route 79	Keilor Road; Mount Alexander Road	Niddrie	Essendon	Flemington	8 km (5 mi)	Replaced when Tullamarine Freeway opened in 1970, removed in 1989
Decommissioned or unsigned route

== National Highways ==
With the passing of the National Roads Act in 1974, selected National Routes were further upgraded to the status of a National Highway: interstate roads linking Australia's capital cities and major regional centres that received federal funding, and were of higher importance than other National Routes. These new routes were symbolised by green shields with gold writing, and the word "National" along the top of the shield. Victoria's first two National Highways, the Western and Hume Highways, were declared in 1974 and their shields converted in the following years; the Sturt and Goulburn Valley Highways were declared later in 1992.

Like National Routes, Victoria's National Highways were also replaced with the Statewide Route Numbering Scheme, introduced across the state beginning in late 1996: each route was converted to an alphanumeric route number, all keeping their number during the conversion, but also initially keeping the National green-and-gold shield design; this was eventually eliminated in 2014. While most routes were replaced in 1997, the tail-ends of some routes terminating in suburban Melbourne were kept for some years afterwards, until bypassed or reallocated with the opening of a related road project: these are stated in the table below. The last of Victoria's National Highways, the tail-end of National Highway 8, was finally eliminated in 2009.

Route	Component roads	From	Via	To	Length	Notes
National Highway 8	Western Highway	Vic/SA border	Horsham; Ararat; Beaufort; Ballarat; Melton; Deer Park; Footscray; Flemington	Parkville	440 km (273 mi)	Replaced by in 1997, progressively being replaced by from 2013
National Highway 8	Western Freeway	Vic/SA border	Horsham; Ararat; Beaufort; Ballarat; Melton; Deer Park; Footscray; Flemington	Parkville	440 km (273 mi)	Progressively reallocated along Western Freeway sections as they opened, replaced by in 1997, progressively being replaced by from 2013
National Highway 8	Western Highway	Vic/SA border	Horsham; Ararat; Beaufort; Ballarat; Melton; Deer Park; Footscray; Flemington	Parkville	440 km (273 mi)	Replaced by in 1997 between Ravenhall and Ardeer, later by when Deer Park bypass opened in 2009, renamed to Ballarat Road
National Highway 8	Ballarat Road	Vic/SA border	Horsham; Ararat; Beaufort; Ballarat; Melton; Deer Park; Footscray; Flemington	Parkville	440 km (273 mi)	Replaced by when Deer Park bypass opened in 2009
National Highway 8	Ballarat Road; Smithfield Road; Racecourse Road; Flemington Road	Vic/SA border	Horsham; Ararat; Beaufort; Ballarat; Melton; Deer Park; Footscray; Flemington	Parkville	440 km (273 mi)	Allocation removed when Deer Park bypass opened in 2009, not replaced
National Highway 20	Sturt Highway	Vic/SA border	Mildura	Vic/NSW border	117 km (73 mi)	Replaced by in 1997, progressively being replaced by from 2013
National Highway 31	Hume Freeway	Vic/NSW border	Wodonga; Wangaratta; Benalla; Seymour; Craigieburn; Coburg; Brunswick; Parkville; Docklands	South Melbourne	305 km (190 mi)	Progressively reallocated along Hume Freeway sections as they opened, replaced by in 1997, progressively being replaced by from 2013
National Highway 31	Hume Highway	Vic/NSW border	Wodonga; Wangaratta; Benalla; Seymour; Craigieburn; Coburg; Brunswick; Parkville; Docklands	South Melbourne	305 km (190 mi)	Replaced by in 1997 between Craigieburn and Fawkner, later by when Craigieburn bypass opened in 2005, renamed Sydney Road
National Highway 31	Hume Highway; Sydney Road; Royal Parade; Peel Street; Dudley Street; Wurundjeri Way; Montague Street	Vic/NSW border	Wodonga; Wangaratta; Benalla; Seymour; Craigieburn; Coburg; Brunswick; Parkville; Docklands	South Melbourne	305 km (190 mi)	– southern end extended from Parkville to South Melbourne along Peel and Dudley Streets, then along Footscray Road to Montague Street when West Gate Freeway extension opened in 1988 – re-aligned from Footscray Road to current alignment when Wurundjeri Way opened in 1999 – replaced by when Craigieburn bypass opened in 2005, Hume Highway renamed Sydney Road
National Highway 39	Goulburn Valley Freeway	Seymour	Nagambie; Shepparton; Strathmerton	Vic/NSW border	165 km (103 mi)	Progressively reallocated along Goulburn Valley Freeway sections as they opened, replaced by in 1997, later by in 2001, progressively being replaced by from 2013
National Highway 39	Goulburn Valley Highway	Seymour	Nagambie; Shepparton; Strathmerton	Vic/NSW border	165 km (103 mi)	Replaced by in 1997, progressively being replaced by from 2013
Decommissioned or unsigned route

== Metropolitan and State Routes ==
=== Melbourne ===
Early in 1964, planning by the Traffic Commission (and consulting with 43 municipal councils and the Country Roads Board), the Metropolitan Route Numbering Scheme – a new route numbering system for the Greater Melbourne area – was unveiled in 1965; Victoria was the first mainland state to adopt this system. The Metropolitan ("Metro") route numbering scheme was symbolised by blue rounded shields with white writing: east–west routes were to be even-numbered, while north–south routes were to be odd-numbered; the numbers allotted to routes were to be complementary to the existing National Routes system; a year later, most of the urban municipalities were either cooperating in the project or had agreed to do so, with 18 having completed or substantially completed the erection of route markers. The scheme had a significant refurbishment during the late 1980s: between 1987 and 1990, many existing routes through Melbourne were modified and new routes were introduced (noted in the table below) to cover new growth areas of Melbourne, involving consultation with over 54 metropolitan municipalities as well as road user groups. A total of 76,000 signs were installed at 1,060 intersections and other locations at a cost of $530,000, with the last signs installed in April 1990.

The most recent change to the system was the introduction of the Statewide Route Numbering System into regional Victoria, beginning in late 1996. While many routes on the outer urban fringes of Melbourne were incorporated into the new alphanumeric system (some only introduced less than 10 years earlier), the majority of the system across suburban Melbourne still survives to the current day. While some metropolitan routes are still being allocated (like in 2016), the expectation is their eventual replacement in the near-future by the new alphanumeric system, with a small number of routes currently undergoing conversion.

Route	Component roads	From	Via	To	Length	Notes
Metro Route 2	Footscray Road; Montague Street; City Road; Alexandra Avenue; Grange Road, Burnley; Loyola Grove / Madden Grove; Yarra Boulevard (I); Church Street / High Street, Kew; Stevenson Street; Hodgson Street; McEvoy Street; Yarra Boulevard (II); Chandler Highway; Heidelberg Road; The Boulevard	Docklands	Southbank; Burnley; Kew; Ivanhoe	Eaglemont	32 km (20 mi)	– northern end extended along Montague Street and Footscray Road when Charles Grimes Bridge opened in 1978 – replaced by Yarra Scenic Drive in 1989
Metro Route 3	Swanston Street; St Kilda Road; Brighton Road; Nepean Highway	Melbourne	St Kilda; Moorabbin; Mordialloc; Frankston	Mornington	51.8 km (32 mi)	– northern end along Swanston and Elizabeth streets terminating in Parkville truncated to current alignment in 1989 – concurrencies with: along Nepean Highway through Mentone; along Nepean Highway through Brighton East; along Nepean Highway through Elsternwick
Metro Route 3	Nepean Highway; Point Nepean Road	Mornington	Dromana; Rosebud; Sorrento	Point Nepean	42.1 km (26 mi)	Replaced by from Mornington to Sorrento in 1998
Metro Route 3	Nepean Highway; Point Nepean Road	Mornington	Dromana; Rosebud; Sorrento	Point Nepean	42.1 km (26 mi)	Removed from Sorrento to Point Nepean in 1998
Metro Route 4	Cranbourne–Frankston Road	Frankston	Langwarrin; Skye	Cranbourne	17 km (11 mi)	– allocated in 1989 – eastern end along Pattersons Road terminating in Clyde replaced by, renamed to Berwick–Cranbourne Road
Metro Route 5	Dorset Road; Burwood Highway; Glenfern Road; Lysterfield Road	Croydon	Boronia; Ferntree Gully	Lysterfield	19 km (12 mi)	– allocated in 1989 – concurrency with along Burwood Highway through Ferntree Gully
Metro Route 6	McLeod Road; Thompson Road	Carrum	Patterson Lakes; Cranbourne North; Cranbourne East	Clyde North	19 km (12 mi)	Allocated in 1989
Metro Route 7	Croydon Road; Wonga Road; Warranwood Road; Plymouth Road; Yarra Road; Kent Avenue; Wicklow Avenue; Bayswater Road; Scoresby Road	Warrandyte South	Croydon; Bayswater; Scoresby	Knoxfield	18 km (11 mi)	Allocated in 1989 – concurrency with along Maroondah Highway and along Mount Dandenong Road through Croydon
Metro Route 8	Ballarat Road	Caroline Springs	Deer Park; Sunshine; Maidstone	Footscray	21 km (13 mi)	Allocated when Deer Park bypass opened in 2009, replacing (from Ravenhall to Ardeer) and (from Ardeer to Footscray)
Metro Route 9	Kangaroo Ground–Wattle Glen Road; Eltham–Yarra Glen Road; Kangaroo Ground–Warrandyte Road; Ringwood–Warrandyte Road; Warrandyte Road; Wantirna Road; Boronia Road; Stud Road; Foster Street; Lonsdale Street, Dandenong; Frankston–Dandenong Road; Dandenong Road West; Fletcher Road	Wattle Glen	Kangaroo Ground; Warrandyte; Ringwood; Wantirna; Scoresby; Rowville; Dandenong; Carrum Downs	Frankston	63 km (39 mi)	– southern end re-aligned through Frankston from Dandenong Road East and Beach Street to current alignment in 1991 when Beach Street rail crossing closed – concurrencies with: along Lonsdale Street through Dandenong; along Boronia Road through Wantirna; along Ringwood–Warrandyte Road through Warrandyte
Metro Route 10	Balcombe Road; Nepean Highway; Lower Dandenong Road; Cheltenham Road; Foster Street	Black Rock	Mentone; Braeside; Keysborough	Dandenong	18 km (11 mi)	Concurrency with along Nepean Highway through Mentone
Metro Route 11	Mornington Peninsula Freeway (I)	Chelsea Heights	Seaford; Frankston; Moorooduc; Mount Martha; Dromana	Rosebud	51 km (32 mi)	– northern end via Springvale Road terminating in Donvale truncated to current alignment (replaced by) in 1989 – progressively re-aligned from Wells Road as sections of the Mornington Peninsula Freeway opened through the late 1970s – replaced by when Peninsula Link opened in 2013
Metro Route 11	Frankston Freeway	Chelsea Heights	Seaford; Frankston; Moorooduc; Mount Martha; Dromana	Rosebud	51 km (32 mi)	– progressively re-aligned from Wells Road as sections of the Frankston Freeway (initially called Wells Road By-pass) opened through the early 1970s – replaced by when Peninsula Link opened in 2013
Metro Route 11	Moorooduc Highway	Chelsea Heights	Seaford; Frankston; Moorooduc; Mount Martha; Dromana	Rosebud	51 km (32 mi)	– southern end extended along Moorooduc Highway and Mornington Peninsula Freeway from Frankston South to Rosebud (replacing) in 1989 – replaced by: from Frankston to Frankston South; from Frankston South to Tuerong when Peninsula Link opened in 2013; unallocated from Tuerong to Mount Martha, renamed Old Moorooduc Road
Metro Route 11	Mornington Peninsula Freeway (II)	Chelsea Heights	Seaford; Frankston; Moorooduc; Mount Martha; Dromana	Rosebud	51 km (32 mi)	– re-aligned from (Old) Moorooduc Road to Mornington Peninsula Freeway when eastern extension opened (from Mount Martha to Moorooduc) in 1994 – replaced by when Peninsula Link opened in 2013
Metro Route 12	Governor Road; Hutton Road; Greens Road; South Gippsland Highway; Pound Road; Shrives Road; Centre Road; Fullard Road	Mordialloc	Keysborough; Hampton Park	Narre Warren	19 km (12 mi)	– allocated in 1989: rerouted from Webb Street to current alignment during the 2010s; – concurrency with along South Gippsland Highway through Dandenong South
Metro Route 13	Andersons Creek Road; Blackburn Road (I); Surrey Road; Whitehorse Road; Chapel Street, Blackburn; Railway Road; Blackburn Road (II)	Doncaster East	Blackburn; Mount Waverley	Clayton	20 km (12 mi)	Northern end re-aligned through Doncaster East from Blackburn Road to current alignment in 1989
Metro Route 14	South Road; Dingley Bypass; Kingston Road; Heatherton Road; Robinson Road; King Road	Brighton	Moorabbin; Heatherton; Springvale; Endeavour Hills	Narre Warren North	34 km (21 mi)	– eastern end extended along Kingston and Heatherton Roads from Heatherton to Harkaway in 1989 – re-aligned through Heatherton from Warrigal and Heatherton Roads when Dingley Bypass opened in 2016 – concurrency with along Dingley Bypass through Clarinda
Metro Route 15	Warrigal Road	Surrey Hills	Burwood; Oakleigh; Moorabbin	Parkdale	19 km (12 mi)	
Metro Route 16	Centre Road; Police Road	Brighton East	Bentleigh; Clayton; Springvale	Mulgrave	17 km (11 mi)	– allocated in 1989 – eastern end extended along Police Road through Mulgrave when EastLink opened in 2008
Metro Route 17	Burke Road; Princes Highway; Grange Road, Glen Huntly; Jasper Road	Eaglemont	Camberwell; Caulfield; Bentleigh	Moorabbin	18 km (11 mi)	Concurrencies with: along Princes Highway through Caulfield; along Burke Road through Hawthorn East
Metro Route 18	North Road; Wellington Road	Brighton	Ormond; Huntingdale; Wheelers Hill	Rowville	21 km (13 mi)	– eastern end extended along Wellington Road from Lysterfield to Clematis in 1989 – replaced along Wellington Road from Rowville to Clematis by
Metro Route 19	Glenferrie Road; Hawthorn Road; Nepean Highway; Cummins Road; Bluff Road	Kew	Malvern; Caulfield; Brighton East	Black Rock	19 km (12 mi)	Concurrency with along Nepean Highway through Brighton East
Metro Route 20	City Road; Alexandra Avenue; Swan Street; Wallen Road; Riversdale Road	South Melbourne	Richmond; Burnley; Camberwell	Box Hill South	16 km (10 mi)	– allocated in 1989 – western end along Montague Street and Footscray Road terminating in Docklands truncated to current alignment when Wurundjeri Way opened in 1999 – concurrency with along Swan Street and Wallen Road through Burnley
Metro Route 21	Broadway; Boldrewood Parade; Albert Street; Station Street, Thornbury; Darebin Road; Grange Road, Alphington; Chandler Highway; Princess Street / Denmark Street; Wallen Road / Swan Street; Madden Grove / Loyola Grove; Grange Road, Burnley	Reservoir	Thornbury; Kew; Burnley	Toorak	17 km (11 mi)	– northern end extended from Alphington to Reservoir in 1989 – concurrency with along Wallen Road and Swan Street through Burnley
Metro Route 22	Glen Eira Road; Booran Road; Neerim Road; Murrumbeena Road; Princes Highway; Ferntree Gully Road; Burwood Highway	Balaclava	Carnegie; Wheelers Hill; Scoresby	Upper Ferntree Gully	31 km (19 mi)	– western end extended along Neerim and Glen Eira Roads in 1989: rerouted from Neerim Grove and Neerim Road to Poath Road, then eventually to Murrumbeena Road; – replaced along Mount Dandenong Tourist Road from Upper Ferntree Gully to Montrose by – concurrencies with: along Princes Highway through Oakleigh; along Burwood Highway through Ferntree Gully
Metro Route 22	Mount Dandenong Road	Ringwood	Croydon	Montrose	10 km (6 mi)	Replaced by when Ringwood Bypass extension opened in 2008
Metro Route 23	Wetherby Road; Middleborough Road; Stephensons Road; Clayton Road; Boundary Road, Braeside; Wells Road	Doncaster East	Box Hill; Burwood; Clayton	Aspendale Gardens	26 km (16 mi)	Allocated in 1989
Metro Route 24	Lorne Street; High Street (east–west); High Street Road	Windsor	Armadale; Glen Iris; Glen Waverley	Knoxfield	24 km (15 mi)	Western end extended along Lorne Street in 1989: Eastern end extended from Stud Road to Burwood Highway in 1989
Metro Route 25	Alexandra Avenue; Williams Road; Hotham Street; Rusden Street; New Street, Brighton	Burnley	Prahran; Brighton	Hampton	12 km (7 mi)	Northern end extended along Alexandra Avenue to Grange Road in 2012: concurrency with along Nepean Highway through Elsternwick
Metro Route 26	Kerferd Road; Albert Road, Melbourne; Kings Way; Toorak Road; Burwood Highway	Albert Park	Toorak; Burwood East; Wantirna South	Upper Ferntree Gully	34 km (21 mi)	– western end along Howe Parade, Beach Street and Beaconsfield Parade truncated to current alignment in 1989 – eastern end extended from Belgrave to Emerald along Belgrave-Gembrook Road in 1989 – replaced along Burwood Highway and Belgrave–Gembrook Road from Upper Ferntree Gully to Emerald by – concurrency with along Burwood Highway through Ferntree Gully
Metro Route 27	Plenty Road	Bundoora	Kingsbury	Preston	9.7 km (6 mi)	– northern end extended along Plenty Road from South Morang to Whittlesea in 1989 – northern end truncated back to South Morang, replaced by along Plenty Road from South Morang to Whittlesea in 1998 – northern end truncated further to Bundoora, replaced by along Plenty Road from Bundoora to Mernda in 2021
Metro Route 28	Mountain Highway	Vermont South	Bayswater; The Basin	Sassafras	18 km (11 mi)	
Metro Route 29	High Street (north–south); Hoddle Street; Punt Road; Barkly Street	Epping	Thomastown; Preston; Northcote; East Melbourne; Prahran	Elwood	28 km (17 mi)	Concurrency with along High Street through Epping
Metro Route 30	Bay Street; Crockford Street; City Road; Montague Street; Wurundjeri Way; Flinders Street; Wellington Parade; Bridge Road; Burwood Road; Camberwell Road	Port Melbourne	South Melbourne; Richmond	Camberwell	16 km (10 mi)	– re-aligned through central Melbourne from Flinders and Spencer Streets and Normanby Road to Flinders Street (extension), North Wharf Road, Johnson and Montague Streets and Normanby Road when Charles Grimes Bridge opened in 1978 – western end re-aligned from Johnson and Montague Streets, Normanby and Williamstown Roads, Yarra River crossing, Douglas Parade and Kororoit Creek Road terminating in Laverton North (replaced by) to Johnson Street, Lorimer and Rogers Street (to meet the then-terminus of West Gate Freeway) in 1981 due to the closure of the Yarra River punt service in 1979 – western end truncated to terminate at North Wharf Road when West Gate Freeway extension to Montague Street opened in 1985 – western end extended to Port Melbourne in 1989 – re-aligned through central Melbourne along Wurundjeri Way when it opened in 1999 – concurrency with along Bay Street through Port Melbourne
Metro Route 32	Boundary Road, Derrimutt; Fairbairn Road; Somerville Road; Market Road; Sunshine Road; Buckley Street / Napier Street; Footscray Road; Dudley Street; Peel Street; Victoria Street (I); Victoria Parade; Victoria Street (II); Barkers Road; Burke Road; Canterbury Road	Derrimut	Footscray; North Melbourne; Hawthorn; Box Hill South; Vermont	Montrose	53 km (33 mi)	– western end re-aligned from Somerville Road and Whitehall Street terminating in Yarraville (replaced by) to current alignment in 1989 – re-aligned through central Melbourne previously along Adderley and LaTrobe Streets to current alignment in 1989 – replaced along Swansea Road and Anderson Street from Montrose to Lilydale by – concurrencies with: along Burke Road through Hawthorn East; along Dudley Street through central Melbourne
Metro Route 33	Graham Street; Bay Street; Beaconsfield Parade; Jacka Boulevard; Marine Parade; Ormond Esplanade; St Kilda Street; Esplanade; Beach Road	Port Melbourne	St Kilda; Elwood; Brighton; Mordialloc	Mordialloc	29 km (18 mi)	– northern end re-aligned from Spencer and Claredon Streets, City Road, Crockford and Bay Streets terminating in West Melbourne to current alignment in 1989 – concurrency with along Bay Street through Port Melbourne
Metro Route 34	Swanston Street; Elgin Street; Johnston Street; Studley Park Road; Cotham Road; Whitehorse Road; Maroondah Highway	Carlton	Collingwood; Kew; Balwyn; Box Hill; Blackburn; Ringwood	Lilydale	38.1 km (24 mi)	– eastern end extended along Maroondah Highway from Lilydale to Alexandra in 1986 – western end along Gatehouse Street and College Crescent truncated to current alignment in 1989 – eastern end truncated back to Lilydale, replaced by along Maroondah Highway from Lilydale to Alexandra in 1998
Metro Route 35	Somerton Road; Pascoe Vale Road; Ascot Vale Road; Epsom Road; Smithfield Road; Moore Street / Hopkins Street; Whitehall Street; Francis Street / Hyde Street; Douglas Parade; Kororoit Creek Road	Somerton	Broadmeadows; Ascot Vale; Footscray; Spotswood; Williamstown	Laverton North	40 km (25 mi)	– southern end extended along Douglas Parade and Kororoit Creek Road from Spotswood to Laverton North (replacing) in 1981 due to the closure of the Yarra River punt service in 1979 – northern end re-aligned from Barry Road terminating in Campbellfield to current alignment in 1989 – re-aligned through Footscray from Cowper and Bunbury and Hyde Streets to current alignment in 1989 – concurrencies with: along Kororoit Creek Road through Altona; along Whitehall Street through Footscray; along Somerton Road through Roxburgh Park; along Smithfield Road from Flemington to Footscray
Metro Route 36	Church Street; High Street, Kew; Doncaster Road; Mitcham Road; Boronia Road; Forest Road	Hawthorn	Kew; Doncaster; Mitcham; Wantirna	The Basin	33 km (21 mi)	Concurrencies with: along Boronia Road through Wantirna; along Doncaster Road from Doncaster to Donvale
Metro Route 37	Bulla Road; Lincoln Road; Waverley Street; Raleigh Road; Van Ness Avenue; Gordon Street; Williamstown Road; Melbourne Road	Essendon North	Moonee Ponds; Footscray; Newport	Williamstown	16 km (10 mi)	– northern end extended from Essendon to Essendon North along Bulla Road (replacing) when Tullamarine Freeway extension opened in 1970 – concurrency with along Raleigh Road through Maribyrnong
Metro Route 38	Durham Road; Monash Street; Cornwall Road; Devonshire Road / Churchill Avenue; Hampstead Road; Raleigh Road / Maribyrnong Road; Ormond Road; Brunswick Road; Holden Street; St Georges Road; Merri Parade / Westgarth Street	Sunshine	Maidstone; Maribyrnong; Moonee Ponds; Brunswick; Northcote	Fairfield	19 km (12 mi)	– western end extended from Sunshine to Maidstone in 1989 – concurrencies with: along Raleigh Road through Maribyrnong; along Churchill Avenue and Hampstead Road through Maidstone; along St Georges Road through Fitzroy North
Metro Route 39	Mickleham Road; Melrose Drive / Sharps Road; Keilor Park Drive; Milleara Road / Military Road; Canning Street / Cordite Avenue; Hampstead Road; Churchill Avenue; Ashley Street; Sredna Street (northbound); Dempster Street (southbound); Paramount Road; Somerville Road; McDonald Road; Geelong Road; Grieve Parade; Kororoit Creek Road; Maidstone Street	Greenvale	Keilor Park; Maribyrnong; Sunshine; Altona North	Altona	37 km (23 mi)	– allocated in 1989 – replaced along Mickleham Road from Yuroke to Greenvale by – concurrencies with: along Kororoit Creek Road through Altona; along Churchill Avenue and Hampstead Road through Maidstone; along Geelong Road through Brooklyn; along Grieve Parade through Altona North
Metro Route 40	Fitzgerald Road; Boundary Road; Mt Derrimut Road; Station Road; Kings Road; Taylors Road; Green Gully Road	Laverton North	Derrimut; Deer Park; Kings Park; St Albans; Keilor Downs	Keilor	20 km (12 mi)	– western end re-aligned from Lancefield and Bulla Roads, Woodland Street, Reynolds Parade to Bell Street terminating in Bulla to Tullamarine Bypass Road when it opened in 1968 – re-aligned through Pascoe Vale South from Lancefield and Bulla Roads, Woodland Street and Reynolds Parade to Tullamarine Freeway when it opened in 1970 – re-aligned through Airport West from Lancefield Road to Tullamarine Freeway when last stage converted in 1979 – western end re-aligned from Sunbury Road and Tullamarine Freeway terminating in Bulla (replaced by) to current alignment in 1989
Metro Route 40	Calder Freeway; Tullamarine Freeway	Keilor	Airport West	Strathmore	9.8 km (6 mi)	Removed in 2020, route split into two sections
Metro Route 40	Bell Street; Bell–Banksia Link; Banksia Street; Manningham Road; Williamsons Road; Doncaster Road; Mitcham Road; Springvale Road; Edithvale Road	Pascoe Vale South	Coburg; Heidelberg; Doncaster; Nunawading; Glen Waverley; Springvale	Edithvale	52 km (32 mi)	– eastern end re-aligned from Station Street and Huntingdale Road (replaced by) to current alignment in 1989 – southern end extended from Doncaster to Edithvale (replacing from Donvale to Chelsea Heights) in 1989 – concurrencies with: along Doncaster Road from Doncaster to Donvale; along Williamsons Road through Doncaster
Metro Route 41	Sunshine Avenue; McIntyre Road; Anderson Road; Wright Street; Market Road; Somerville Road; McDonald Road; Millers Road; Queen Street, Altona; Central Avenue	Keilor North	Taylors Lakes; St Albans; Sunshine; Brooklyn; Altona	Altona Meadows	30 km (19 mi)	Northern end re-aligned from Green Gully Road, Arthur Street and St Albans Road terminating in Keilor to current alignment in 1989
Metro Route 42	Bulleen Road; Thompsons Road, Bulleen; Foote Street; Williamsons Road; Porter Street / Newmans Road; Warrandyte Road; Heidelberg–Warrandyte Road; Ringwood–Warrandyte Road; Jumping Creek Road	Balwyn North	Templestowe; Warrandyte	Wonga Park	27 km (17 mi)	– re-aligned through Templestowe from Parker and Anderson Streets (replaced by) to current alignment in 1989 – eastern end extended to Wonga Park via Jumping Creek Road in 1989 – concurrencies with: along Ringwood–Warrandyte Road through Warrandyte; along Williamsons Road through Templestowe; along Foote Street through Templestowe
Metro Route 43	Gap Road; Horne Street; Macedon Street; Sunbury Road (I); Bulla Road; Sunbury Road (II)	Sunbury	Bulla; Melbourne Airport; Gladstone Park; Essendon Fields; Brunswick West; Flemington	Port Melbourne	44 km (27 mi)	– allocated from Sunbury to Melbourne Airport (replacing from Bulla to Melbourne Airport) in 1989 – replaced by: along Gap Road through Sunbury; along Horne Street through Sunbury; from Sunbury to Melbourne Airport
Metro Route 43	Tullamarine Freeway	Sunbury	Bulla; Melbourne Airport; Gladstone Park; Essendon Fields; Brunswick West; Flemington	Port Melbourne	44 km (27 mi)	– allocated from Melbourne Airport to Essendon Airport (replacing) in 1989 – southern end extended to Port Melbourne when CityLink (Western link) opened in 1999 – replaced by in 2018
Metro Route 43	CityLink (Western link)	Sunbury	Bulla; Melbourne Airport; Gladstone Park; Essendon Fields; Brunswick West; Flemington	Port Melbourne	44 km (27 mi)	Allocated in 1999 when CityLink (Western link) opened, toll road, replaced by in 2018
Metro Route 44	Lower Heidelberg Road; Rosanna Road; Lower Plenty Road; Main Road, Eltham; Eltham–Yarra Glen Road	Ivanhoe	Heidelberg; Eltham	Kangaroo Ground	22 km (14 mi)	Concurrency with along Lower Plenty Road through Rosanna
Metro Route 45	Spring Street; St Georges Road; Brunswick Street	Reservoir	Preston; Fitzroy	Collingwood	11 km (7 mi)	– allocated in 1989 – concurrency with along St Georges Road through Fitzroy North
Metro Route 46	Main Hurstbridge Road; Chute Street; Main Street, Diamond Creek; Diamond Creek Road; Greensborough Bypass; Greensborough Road; Lower Plenty Road; Upper Heidelberg Road; Heidelberg Road; Queens Parade; George Street (southbound); Alexandra Parade; Princes Street, Carlton North; Rathdowne Street	Hurstbridge	Diamond Creek; Greensborough; Heidelberg; Westgarth	East Melbourne	28 km (17 mi)	– southern end along Exhibition Street to central Melbourne truncated to current alignment in 1989 – re-aligned through Greensborough from Grimshaw Street and Diamond Creek Road to current alignment in 1989 – concurrencies with: along Lower Plenty Road through Rosanna; along Diamond Creek Road through Diamond Creek; along Princes Street and Alexandra Parade through Fitzroy North
Metro Route 47	Williamsons Road; Tram Road; Station Street, Box Hill; Highbury Road; Huntingdale Road	Templestowe	Doncaster; Box Hill; Burwood; Oakleigh	Huntingdale	18 km (11 mi)	– allocated in 1989, replaced: from Doncaster to Huntingdale; from Eltham to Doncaster – replaced along Fitzsimons Lane and Williamsons Road from Templestowe to Eltham by in 2022 – concurrencies with: along Williamsons Road through Doncaster; along Williamsons Road through Templestowe
Metro Route 48	Mickleham Road; Broadmeadows Deviation; Johnstone Street / Camp Road; Mahoneys Road; Keon Parade; Dalton Road / Wood Street; Settlement Road; Grimshaw Street; The Circuit; Para Road; Sherbourne Road; Bridge Street, Eltham	Gladstone Park	Broadmeadows; Thomastown; Greensborough	Eltham	29 km (18 mi)	– eastern end along Main Road, Fitzsimons Lane and Williamsons Road terminating in Doncaster truncated to current alignment (replaced by) in 1989 – re-aligned through Thomastown from High Street and Settlement Road to current alignment in 1989
Metro Route 49	Westall Road; Dandenong Bypass	Clayton	Keysborough	Dandenong South	15 km (9 mi)	– allocated in 1989 – extended south to Keysborough when extension opened in 1995, extended north to Clayton when extension opened in 2001 – eastern end extended along Dandenong Bypass when its second stage opened in 2012
Metro Route 50	Somerville Road; Whitehall Street; Hopkins Street; Dynon Road; Spencer Street; Clarendon Street	Yarraville	Footscray; West Melbourne	Southbank	10 km (6 mi)	– allocated in 1989 – concurrency with along Whitehall Street through Footscray
Metro Route 52	Bulleen Road; Templestowe Road; Foote Street; Reynolds Road; Springvale Road	Bulleen	Templestowe	Donvale	15 km (9 mi)	– allocated in 1989 – concurrency with along Foote Street through Templestowe
Metro Route 54	Keilor–Melton Road	Melton	Sydenham	Keilor	18 km (11 mi)	Allocated in 1989, replaced by, renamed Melton Highway
Metro Route 55	Hume Highway; Sydney Road; Royal Parade; Peel Street; Dudley Street; Wurundjeri Way; Montague Street	Craigieburn	Campbellfield; Coburg; Brunswick; Parkville; Docklands	South Melbourne	34 km (21 mi)	– allocated when the Craigieburn bypass opened in 2005, replacing (from Craigieburn to Fawkner) and (from Fawkner to South Melbourne) – concurrency with along Dudley Street through central Melbourne
Metro Route 56	Blackshaws Road	Altona North		Newport	5.0 km (3 mi)	– allocated in 1989 – replaced along Dohertys Road from Laverton North to Altona North by in 2020
Metro Route 57	Yan Yean Road; Diamond Creek Road; Ryans Road; Wattletree Road	Doreen	Diamond Creek	Eltham	15 km (9 mi)	– allocated in 1989 – replaced along Bridge Inn Road from Mernda to Doreen by B720 in 2024 – concurrency with along Diamond Creek Road through Diamond Creek
Metro Route 58	Oaklands Road; Somerton Road; Cooper Street; High Street (north–south); Memorial Avenue / McDonalds Road; Gorge Road; Kurrak Road	Bulla	Roxburgh Park; Epping; South Morang	Yarrambat	28 km (17 mi)	– allocated in 1989 – concurrency with: along High Street through Epping; along Somerton Road through Roxburgh Park
Metro Route 60	Sages Road; Baxter–Tooradin Road	Frankston South	Baxter; Pearcedale	Devon Meadows	19 km (12 mi)	Allocated in 1989, replaced by
Metro Route 60	Flemington Road; Harker Street; Curzon Street; King Street	Parkville	West Melbourne	Southbank	6 km (4 mi)	– Reallocated in 2013, replaced southern end of through central Melbourne – Slowly being replaced by
Metro Route 61	Berwick Road; Harkaway Road; Lyall Road	Narre Warren East	Harkaway	Berwick	10.6 km (7 mi)	– allocated in 1989 – southern end along Clyde and Berwick–Cranbourne and Clyde-Fiveways Road terminating in Five Ways truncated to current alignment in 1998 – replaced by: from Berwick to Clyde North; from Clyde North to Clyde; from Clyde to Five Ways
Metro Route 62	Main Street, Mornington; Mornington–Tyabb Road	Mornington	Moorooduc	Tyabb	13 km (8 mi)	Allocated in 1989, replaced by
Metro Route 62	Ringwood Bypass; Mount Dandenong Road	Ringwood	Croydon	Montrose	12 km (7 mi)	Reallocated in 2008, replaces eastern end of when Ringwood Bypass extension opened
Metro Route 63	Hereford Road; Monbulk Road; Belgrave–Hallam Road; Narre Warren North Road; Narre Warren–Cranbourne Road; Cameron Street	Lilydale	Mount Evelyn; Monbulk; Belgrave; Narre Warren	Cranbourne	52 km (32 mi)	Allocated in 1989, replaced by: from Lilydale to Cranbourne; through Cranbourne
Metro Route 64	Bittern-Dromana Road	Dromana	Merricks North	Bittern	15 km (9 mi)	Allocated in 1989, replaced by
Metro Route 65	South Gippsland Freeway	Doveton	Lynbrook; Skye; Tyabb	Hastings	31 km (19 mi)	Allocated in 1989, replaced by, later by in 2025
Metro Route 65	Dandenong-Hastings Road	Doveton	Lynbrook; Skye; Tyabb	Hastings	31 km (19 mi)	Allocated in 1989, replaced by: from Lynbrook to Cranbourne South; from Cranbourne South to Hastings; renamed Westernport Highway
Metro Route 67	Davey Street; Hastings Road; Frankston–Flinders Road; Cook Street; Boneo Road	Frankston	Baxter; Somerville; Hastings; Balnarring; Flinders	Rosebud	70 km (43 mi)	Allocated in 1989, replaced by: from Frankston to Frankston South; from Frankston to Rosebud; some shields still seen at Frankston end
Metro Route 69	Balnarring Road	Tuerong	Merricks North	Balnarring	11 km (7 mi)	Allocated in 1989, replaced by
Metro Route 71	Mornington–Flinders Road	Dromana	Main Ridge	Flinders	20 km (12 mi)	Allocated in 1989, replaced by
Metro Route 71	Cook Street	Dromana	Main Ridge	Flinders	20 km (12 mi)	Allocated in 1989, replaced by
Metro Route 73	Coolart Road	Baxter	Bittern	Balnarring	18 km (11 mi)	Allocated in 1989, replaced by
Metro Route 77	Kings Road	Keilor North	Taylors Lakes	Delahey	5 km (3 mi)	– Allocated in 2015 – All signage missing shields except for Taylors Road intersection
Metro Route 80	South Eastern Freeway	Richmond		Burnley	2.9 km (2 mi)	Replaced by when extension from Burnley to Kooyong opened in 1970, later by in 1988, eventually by in 1997, and as part of CityLink (Southern link) in 1999
Metro Route 80	Western Ring Road; Metropolitan Ring Road	Altona North	Derrimut; Ardeer; Keilor East; Airport West; Thomastown	Greensborough	38 km (24 mi)	– allocated when first section opened in 1992; some shields quickly replaced by shields – replaced by when final section completed in 1997, progressively being replaced by from 2013
Metro Route 83	Princes Highway; Smithfield Road; Racecourse Road; Elliott Avenue; Macarthur Road; Cemetery Road West; College Crescent; Cemetery Road East; Princes Street, Carlton North; Alexandra Parade	Altona North	Footscray; Carlton	Clifton Hill	18 km (11 mi)	concurrencies with: along Smithfield Road from Flemington to Footscray; along Geelong Road through Brooklyn; along Princes Street and Alexandra Parade through Fitzroy North
Metro Route 83	Eastern Freeway	Clifton Hill	Kew Bulleen Doncaster	Nunawading	18 km (11 mi)	– allocated in 1989, replacing along Eastern Freeway to Balwyn North – eastern end extended from Balwyn North to Nunawading when Eastern Freeway extension opened in 1997 – Eastern Freeway section replaced by when Eastlink opened in 2008
Metro Route 87	Dingley Bypass	Oakleigh South	Clarinda; Heatherton; Dingley Village	Springvale South	6 km (4 mi)	– allocated when Dingley Bypass opened in 2016 – concurrency with along Dingley Bypass through Clarinda
Decommissioned or unsigned route

=== Rural Victoria ===
After the success of the Metropolitan Route Numbering Scheme across the Greater Melbourne area, an extension of the system was rolled out across regional Victoria from late 1985 as the State Route Numbering System; the South Gippsland Highway was the first road in Victoria signed with a State Route, with others following through 1986 and 1987, at an estimated cost of $400,000. The designated routes were considered major significant intrastate and regional links that weren't already National Routes. The allocation of State Routes occurred with lower numbers in western Victoria gradually increasing in a clockwise direction to eastern Victoria. Like their suburban Melbourne counterparts, east–west routes were to be even-numbered, while north–south routes were to be odd-numbered, with reservations between 91 and 99 for the Greater Geelong area, and 100–199 for all of rural Victoria.

The system lasted just a decade, before the Statewide Route Numbering Scheme was first introduced in north–eastern Victoria in late 1996. Most State Routes were converted into the alphanumeric system by 1998, with the rest completed by 2000; none now exist, although a few old signs are around.

Route	Component roads	From	Via	To	Length	Notes
State Route 91	Ryrie Street	Geelong	Newcomb; Leopold; Marcus Hill	Queenscliff	31 km (19 mi)	Replaced by
State Route 91	Sydney Parade	Geelong	Newcomb; Leopold; Marcus Hill	Queenscliff	31 km (19 mi)	Unallocated, not replaced
State Route 91	Ormond Road; Bellarine Highway; Flinders Street, Queenscliff; Bethune Street; King Street, Queenscliff; Hesse Street; Wharf Street; Harbour Street; Larkin Parade	Geelong	Newcomb; Leopold; Marcus Hill	Queenscliff	31 km (19 mi)	Replaced by
State Route 100	Surf Coast Highway; Great Ocean Road	Belmont	Torquay; Anglesea; Lorne; Apollo Bay; Port Campbell	Allansford	255 km (158 mi)	Replaced by
State Route 104	Hopkins Highway	Warrnambool	Ellerslie	Mortlake	50 km (31 mi)	– allocated when highway declared in 1990 – replaced by
State Route 106	Hamilton Highway	Hamilton	Penshurst; Mortlake; Cressy	Geelong	231 km (144 mi)	Replaced by
State Route 107	Henty Highway	Lascelles	Warracknabeal; Horsham; Hamilton; Heywood	Portland	231 km (144 mi)	Replaced by: from Horsham to Portland; from Lascelles to Horsham
State Route 111	Grampians Road	Stawell	Halls Gap	Dunkeld	90 km (56 mi)	Replaced by
State Route 112	Glenelg Highway	Vic/SA border (Mount Gambier)	Casterton; Coleraine; Hamilton; Dunkeld; Skipton	Ballarat	304 km (189 mi)	– Continued into South Australia to Mount Gambier as an 'extended' Victorian route – Replaced by
State Route 121	Sunraysia Highway	Ouyen	Lascelles; Birchip; Donald; St Arnaud; Avoca	Ballarat	344 km (214 mi)	Replaced by
State Route 122	Pyrenees Highway	Ararat	Avoca; Maryborough; Castlemaine	Elphinstone	149 km (93 mi)	Replaced by
State Route 124	Northern Grampians Road; Lake Fyans Road; Ararat–Pomonal Road	Bungalally	Halls Gap; Pomonal; Moyston	Ararat	94 km (58 mi)	Replaced by
State Route 130	Wimmera Highway	Vic/SA border (Naracoorte)	Edenhope; Horsham	St Arnaud	256 km (159 mi)	– Continued into South Australia to Naracoorte as an 'extended' Victorian route – shield still visible at the intersection of Wimmera Highway and Hynam Caves Road in Hynam, 10 km east of Naracoorte – Replaced by between Naracoorte and Marong in 1998, later replaced by between Vic/SA border and Marong in 2003
State Route 138	Borung Highway	Dimboola	Warracknabeal; Donald	Charlton	133 km (83 mi)	Replaced by: from Dimboola to Litchfield; Donald to Gil Gil; Gil Gil to Charlton
State Route 141	Loddon Valley Highway	Kerang	Durham Ox; Bendigo	Heathcote	176 km (109 mi)	Replaced by
State Route 141	McIvor Highway	Kerang	Durham Ox; Bendigo	Heathcote	176 km (109 mi)	Replaced by
State Route 148	Hattah–Robinvale Road	Hattah	Wemen	Lake Powell	62 km (39 mi)	– allocated when road declared in 1990 – replaced by
State Route 149	Midland Highway	Geelong	Ballarat; Castlemaine; Bendigo; Shepparton	Benalla	400 km (249 mi)	Replaced by
State Route 153	Midland Highway; Midland Link Highway; Maroondah Highway; Maroondah Link Highway; Goulburn Valley Highway; Melba Highway	Benalla	Barjang; Maindample; Yea; Yarra Glen	Coldstream	181 km (112 mi)	Replaced by
Alternative State Route 153	Midland Highway	Barjang	Mansfield	Maindample	26.7 km (17 mi)	Replaced by from Barjang to Mansfield
Alternative State Route 153	Maroondah Highway	Barjang	Mansfield	Maindample	26.7 km (17 mi)	Replaced by from Mansfield to Maindample
State Route 154	Beechworth–Wangaratta Road; Wodonga–Beechworth Road	Tarrawingee	Beechworth	Wodonga	61 km (38 mi)	Replaced by
State Route 156	Ovens Highway; Alpine Road	Wangaratta	Myrtleford; Bright; Dinner Plain	Omeo	185 km (115 mi)	Replaced by, renamed Great Alpine Road
State Route 160	Glenrowan–Myrtleford Road	Glenrowan	Myrtleford	Running Creek	88 km (55 mi)	Replaced by
State Route 160	Happy Valley Road; Running Creek Road	Glenrowan	Myrtleford	Running Creek	88 km (55 mi)	Replaced by
State Route 164	Mount Buller Road	Mansfield	Merrijig	Mount Buller	58 km (36 mi)	Replaced by
State Route 168	Goulburn Valley Highway	Seymour	Yea; Alexandra	Eildon	106 km (66 mi)	Replaced by
State Route 172	Marysville Road; Marysville–Woods Point Road; Lake Mountain Road	Narbethong	Marysville	Lake Mountain	30 km (19 mi)	Replaced by
State Route 173	Taggerty-Thornton Road	Taggerty		Thornton	12 km (7 mi)	Replaced by
State Route 174	Warburton Highway	Lilydale	Seville; Woori Yallock; Yarra Junction	Warburton	75 km (47 mi)	Replaced by
State Route 175	Healesville–Kinglake Road	Castella	Healesville; Yarra Junction; Neerim; Drouin; Poowong	Korumburra	169 km (105 mi)	Replaced by
State Route 175	Healesville–Koo Wee Rup Road	Castella	Healesville; Yarra Junction; Neerim; Drouin; Poowong	Korumburra	169 km (105 mi)	Replaced by
State Route 175	Dalry Road	Castella	Healesville; Yarra Junction; Neerim; Drouin; Poowong	Korumburra	169 km (105 mi)	Unallocated, not replaced
State Route 175	Don Road	Castella	Healesville; Yarra Junction; Neerim; Drouin; Poowong	Korumburra	169 km (105 mi)	Replaced by
State Route 175	Yarra Junction–Noojee Road	Castella	Healesville; Yarra Junction; Neerim; Drouin; Poowong	Korumburra	169 km (105 mi)	Replaced by
State Route 175	Main Neerim Road	Castella	Healesville; Yarra Junction; Neerim; Drouin; Poowong	Korumburra	169 km (105 mi)	Replaced by: from Rokeby to Drouin West; from Drouin West to Drouin
State Route 175	Drouin–Warragul Road	Castella	Healesville; Yarra Junction; Neerim; Drouin; Poowong	Korumburra	169 km (105 mi)	Replaced by
State Route 175	Drouin–Korumburra Road	Castella	Healesville; Yarra Junction; Neerim; Drouin; Poowong	Korumburra	169 km (105 mi)	Replaced by: from Drouin to Drouin South; from Douin South to Ranceby
State Route 175	Warragul-Korumburra Road	Castella	Healesville; Yarra Junction; Neerim; Drouin; Poowong	Korumburra	169 km (105 mi)	Replaced by
State Route 176	Donna Buang Summit Road	Mount Donna Buang		Warburton	18 km (11 mi)	Unallocated, not replaced
State Route 176	Donna Buang Road	Mount Donna Buang		Warburton	18 km (11 mi)	Replaced by
State Route 176	Acheron Way	Mount Donna Buang		Warburton	18 km (11 mi)	Replaced by
State Route 180	South Gippsland Highway	Dandenong	Cranbourne; Koo Wee Rup; Leongatha; Foster; Yarram	Sale	258 km (160 mi)	– allocated December 1985, the first road in Victoria to be signed with a State Route – replaced by: from Dandenong to Cranbourne (northern section); through Cranbourne; from Cranbourne to Koo Wee Rup (southern section); from Koo Wee Rup to Lang Lang; from Lang Lang to Sale but some shields can be seen near the Dandenong bypass as of 2026
State Route 181	Bass Highway	Lang Lang	Grantville; Wonthaggi	Leongatha	87 km (54 mi)	– extended from Inverloch to Leongatha in 1990 – replaced by: from Lang Lang to Anderson; from Anderson to Leongatha – a faded shield was visible at the McKenzie Street and White Road intersection in Wonthaggi until the intersection was converted to a roundabout
State Route 182	Strzelecki Highway	Leongatha	Mirboo North	Morwell	56 km (35 mi)	– allocated when highway declared in 1990 – replaced by
State Route 186	Phillip Island Road	Anderson	Newhaven	Cowes	23 km (14 mi)	Replaced by
State Route 188	Hyland Highway	Traralgon	Gormandale	Yarram	56 km (35 mi)	– allocated when highway declared in 1990 – replaced by
State Route 189	Meeniyan-Promontory Road; Wilsons Promontory Road	Meeniyan	Fish Creek	Wilsons Promontory	72 km (45 mi)	Replaced by
State Route 190	Monash Way	Morwell	Churchill; Boolarra; Welshpool	Port Welshpool	88 km (55 mi)	Replaced by
State Route 190	Budgeree Road; Grand Ridge Road; Woorarra Road	Morwell	Churchill; Boolarra; Welshpool	Port Welshpool	88 km (55 mi)	Unallocated, not replaced
State Route 190	Welshpool Road	Morwell	Churchill; Boolarra; Welshpool	Port Welshpool	88 km (55 mi)	Replaced by
State Route 191	Kiewa Valley Highway; Bogong High Plains Road	Bandiana	Kiewa; Mount Beauty; Falls Creek	Glen Valley	151 km (94 mi)	Replaced by
State Route 195	Omeo Highway	Tallangatta	Mitta Mitta; Omeo; Bruthen	Bairnsdale	285 km (177 mi)	Replaced by: from Tallangatta to Omeo; from Omeo to Bairnsdale, renamed Great Alpine Road
State Route 199	Bonang Road	Vic/NSW border	Goongerah	Orbost	114 km (71 mi)	Replaced by
Decommissioned or unsigned route

== Freeway Routes ==
After the success of the Metropolitan Route Numbering Scheme across the Greater Melbourne area, a new route number system specifically for suburban freeways was rolled out in 1970, following the opening of the first section of the Tullamarine Freeway. Freeway Routes were symbolised by green rounded shields with white writing, with route numbers prefixed by the letter F. They were the first type of route numbering in Victoria based solely on road classification alone, providing a clear separation to other route numbering systems across Melbourne. Route numbers were adapted from the Metropolitan Route Numbering System, with numbers 80 to 90 exclusively reserved for Freeway Routes.

The system was decommissioned between 1987 and 1990: routes were either replaced by a metropolitan route or a National Route number, or simply removed if allocations already existed concurrent to the Freeway Route. Some of these route numbers have been subsequently reallocated as metropolitan routes across Melbourne (like and).

Route	Component roads	From	Via	To	Length	Notes
Freeway Route 80	South Eastern Freeway	Richmond	Burnley	Kooyong	9 km (6 mi)	Replaced when extension from Burnley to Kooyong opened in 1970; replaced by in 1988 (later by in 1997, then as part of CityLink (southern link) in 1999)
Freeway Route 81	Tullamarine Freeway	Melbourne Airport	Essendon Fields; Moonee Ponds	Flemington	18 km (11 mi)	Replaced by: – from Melbourne Airport to Essendon Airport in 1989 (later by in 2018) – removed from Essendon Airport to Flemington in 1989 (later replaced by as part of CityLink (western link) in 1999, then in 2018)
Freeway Route 81	Mulgrave Freeway; South Gippsland Freeway	Chadstone	Mulgrave; Endeavour Hills	Lyndhurst	25 km (16 mi)	– western end progressively extended as sections opened eventually to Chadstone in 1981 – replaced by: from Chadstone to Eumemmering in 1988 (later by in 1997, then from Doveton to Eumemmering when Hallam bypass opened in 2003, and in 2025); from Eumemmering to Lyndhurst in 1988 (later by in 1997, then in 2025)
Freeway Route 82	West Gate Freeway	Brooklyn	Spotswood	South Melbourne	12 km (7 mi)	– eastern end progressively extended as sections opened eventually to South Melbourne in 1986 – removed in 1987
Freeway Route 83	Eastern Freeway	Clifton Hill	Bulleen	Balwyn North	11 km (7 mi)	– eastern end extended when section opened to Balwyn North in 1982 – replaced by in 1989 (later by in 2008)
Freeway Route 87	Mornington Peninsula Freeway	Safety Beach	Dromana	Rosebud	9 km (6 mi)	– southern end extended when section opened to Rosebud in 1975 – replaced by in 1989 (later by in 2013)
Freeway Route 90	Calder Freeway	Taylors Lakes	Keilor	Niddrie	9 km (6 mi)	– western end progressively extended as sections opened eventually to Taylors Lakes in 1984 – removed in 1987
Decommissioned or unsigned route

== Ring Road Routes ==
Route	Component roads	From	Via	To	Length	Notes
Ring Road 80	Western Ring Road	Tullamarine	Gladstone Park	Jacana	2.8 km (2 mi)	Allocated when first section opened; quickly replaced by in 1992
Decommissioned or unsigned route

== Tourist Routes ==
As part of a major refurbishment of the Metropolitan Route Numbering Scheme in the late 1980s, one of Melbourne's more-scenic metropolitan routes was converted into the state's first Tourist Route in 1989, a route specifically marked as being suited for visiting tourists or linking to particular tourist attractions. Alongside this, pictograms were introduced with the first two being Major Mitchell Trail (1989) and Goldfields Tourist Route (1989). Since then there have been a few more routes using a pictogram such as the Great Alpine Road, Great Ocean Road, and the now defunct Lake Mountain drive.

Tourist Routes are symbolised by a five-sided shield coloured brown or a pictogram usually accompanied with a brown or white arrow intended to stand out from existing routes.

All Tourist Routes were untouched during the introduction of the Statewide Route Numbering System in late 1996.

Tourist Routes follow a similar number block to the Statewide Route Numbering Scheme rather than a continuous sequence. Routes were assigned a two-digit number (excluding Tourist Route 2) with clusters of numbers corresponding to particular regions of the state, very similar to the Statewide Route Numbering Scheme.

Lower-numbered routes are concentrated around Melbourne and routes in the 20s are located along the Otways, Shipwreck Coast, and Surf Coast. Routes in the 30s correspond to Grampians and Pyrenees region and 40s is Goldfields. 50s is associated with the Mallee and Sunraysia regions and 60s is central Victoria; routes in the 70s correspond to north east Victoria; 80s correspond to East Gippsland and 90s Latrobe Valley, Central Gippsland, Bass Coast, and Ninety Mile Beach

The numbering system was not continuous with not all numbers being used in a given range and numbers ending in zero were never assigned to tourist routes. Tourist Routes were usually promoted by local government or tourism bodies.

Route Name and Shield	Component roads	Start	Via	End	Length	Notes		
Tourist Drive 2 Yarra Scenic Drive	Battery Road / Nelson Place; The Strand, Williamstown; North Road, Newport; Douglas Parade; Hyde Street / Francis Street; Williamstown Road; West Gate Freeway; Montague Street; Wurundjeri Way; Flinders Street; Spencer Street; Clarendon Street; City Road; Alexandra Avenue; Grange Road, Burnley; Yarra Boulevard (I); Church Street / High Street, Kew; Studley Park Road; Walmer Street; Yarra Boulevard (II); Chandler Highway; Heidelberg Road; The Boulevard; Burke Road North / Lower Heidelberg Road; Banksia Street; Manningham Road West / Bridge Street; Templestowe Road; Parker Street / Anderson Street; Porter Street / Newmans Road; Heidelberg–Warrandyte Road	Williamstown	Port Melbourne; Southbank; Burnley; Kew; Ivanhoe; Heidelberg; Templestowe	Warrandyte	60 km (37 mi)	– replaced in 1989 – decommissioned between Williamstown and Melbourne CBD; route now starts at the Flinders Street and Spencer Street intersection – replaced by Bay West Trail between Williamstown and Spotswood		
Tourist Drive 2 Silt Jetties – Paynesville Drive	Paynesville Road; Forge Creek Road; Rivermouth Road	Bairnsdale	Eagle Point	Paynesville	23 km (14 miles)	Route is not signed apart from large information board at northern end.		
Tourist Drive 3 Gippsland Lakes Drive	Swan Reach Road; Princes Highway; Metung Road	Wiseleigh	Mossiface; Tambo Upper; Bumberrah; Swan Reach	Metung	24 km (15 mi)			
Tourist Drive 5 Wine & Gold Drive	Cassilis Road	Omeo	Cassilis	Swifts Creek	29 km (18 mi)			
Tourist Drive 5 Tulloch Ard Drive	Basin Road; Tulloch Ard Road	Buchan		Butchers Creek				
Tourist Drive 6 Raymond Creek Falls Tourist Drive	Nicholson Street; Scott Street / Jarrahmond Road; Yalmy Road; Moorsford Road	Orbost		Yalmy	42 km (26 mi)	Route is not signed apart from large information board at southern end.		
Tourist Drive 7 Lakeside & Coastal Tourist Drive	Mallacoota–Genoa Road; Karbeethong Road; Lakeside Drive; Buckland Drive; Allan Drive; Maurice Avenue	Genoa		Mallacoota	22 km (14 mi)			
Tourist Drive 11 Bay West Trail	Duncans Road (I); K Road; Diggers Road; Beach Road; Duncans Road (II); Aviation Road; Point Cook Road; Central Avenue; Queen Street; Maidstone Street; Esplanade, Altona; Beach Street; Civic Parade; Millers Road; Kororoit Creek Road; Victoria Street; Esplanade, Williamstown; Morris Street; Battery Road; Nelson Place; The Strand; North Road; Douglas Parade; (Craig Street or Simcock Avenue); Booker Street; Hudsons Road	Werribee	Werribee South; Point Cook; Altona; Williamstown	Spotswood	55 km (34 mi)	– mostly unsigned – replaced Yarra Scenic Drive between Williamstown and Spotswood		
Tourist Drive 12 Frankston Cultural Drive Dolphin City Drive	Davey Street; Hastings Road; Moorooduc Highway; Golf Links Road; McClelland Drive; Cranbourne Road; Baxter Street	Frankston	Frankston South; Langwarrin	Frankston	14 km (9 mi)	Route is entirely a loop		
Tourist Drive 13 Winery Tour	Melton Highway; Leakes Road; Holden Road; Plumpton Road; Vineyard Road; Horne Street; Riddell Road; Main Road; Kilmore Road; Melbourne–Lancefield Road; Lancefield–Tooborac Road; Burke and Wills Track; (route unknown); Baynton Road; Pipers Creek Road; (route through Kyneton unknown); Bourke Street; Calder Freeway; Springvale Road; Cobb and Co Road; Three Chain Road; Dons Road; Rochford Road; Coach Road; Romsey Road; Straws Lane; Mount Macedon Road; Hamilton Road; Barringo Road; Station Road; Aitken Street; Melton Road; Gisborne-Melton Road; Federation Drive	Melton	Diggers Rest; Sunbury; Riddells Creek; Romsey; Lancefield; Pastoria East; Baynton; Kyneton; Carlsruhe; Newham; Mount Macedon; New Gisborne; Gisborne			Route is entirely a loop		
Tourist Drive 14			Diggers Rest; Sunbury; Riddells Creek; Romsey; Lancefield; Pastoria East; Baynton; Kyneton; Carlsruhe; Newham; Mount Macedon; New Gisborne; Gisborne; Woodend; Trentham; Blackwood; Greendale; Ballan; Gordon; Wattle Flat; Creswick; Daylesford; Glenlyon; Drummond; Malmsbury			Route has multiple branches		
Tourist Drive 21	Western Ring Road; Princes Freeway (west); Melbourne Road, Geelong; Keera Street; Latrobe Terrace; Settlement Road; Surf Coast Highway; Great Ocean Road; Princes Highway (west); Penshurst–Port Fairy Road; Penshurst–Warrnambool Road; Hamilton Highway; Penshurst–Dunkeld Road; Glenelg Highway; Victoria Valley Road; Grampians Road; Western Highway; Western Freeway; Ballarat Road; Western Ring Road	Melbourne	Laverton; Werribee; Lara; Geelong; Torquay; Anglesea; Aireys Inlet; Lorne; Skenes Creek; Apollo Bay; Johanna; Lavers Hill; Princetown; Port Campbell; Peterborough; Allansford; Warrnambool; Killarney; Kirkstall; Hawkesdale; Penshurst; Dunkeld; Halls Gap; Stawell; Great Western; Ararat; Buangor; Beaufort; Trawalla; Ballarat; Gordon; Ballan; Myrniong; Bacchus Marsh; Melton; Rockbank		750 km (466 mi)	– Route is entirely a loop – Route coincides with Great Southern Touring Route		
Tourist Drive 22 Otways Waterfalls & Forest Drive	William Street, Lorne; Erskine Falls Road; Benwerrin–Mount Sabine Road; Kaanglang Road; Station Street, Forrest; Frizon Street, Forrest; Gratton Street, Forrest; Forrest–Apollo Bay Road; Turtons Track; Beech Forest–Mount Sabine Road; Beech Forest–Lavers Hill Road; Colac–Lavers Hill Road; Great Ocean Road	Lorne	Forrest; Barramunga; Beech Forest; Lavers Hill; Apollo Bay; Skenes Creek; Wye River			Route is entirely a loop		
Tourist Drive 31 Grampians Scenic Drive	Ararat–Halls Gap Road	Halls Gap	Moyston; Pomonal	Ararat	44 km (27 mi)			
Tourist Drive 32 Pyrenees / Grampians Wine Trail		Ballarat	Avoca; Stawell; Ararat	Ballarat	271km (168mi)		Loop	
Tourist Drive 41	Pyrnees Highway; North Street, Chewton; Main Road, Chewton; Church Street, Chewton; Cribbs Street, Chewton; Fryers Road, Chewton; Vaughan-Chewton Road; High Street, Fryerstown; Castlemaine Street, Fryerstown; Greville Street, Vaughan; Burgoyne Street, Vaughan; Kemps Bridge Road; Fryers Street, Guildford; Midland Highway; Alexandra Street, Campbells Creek; Cemetery Road, Campbells Creek	Castlemaine	Chewton; Fryerstown; Irishtown; Vaughan; Guildford; Yapeen	Campbells Creek	31.4 km (20 mi)			
Tourist Drive 42	Pyreness Highway; Castlemaine–Maledon Road; High Street, Maledon	Castlemaine		Maldon				
Tourist Drive 43	Bendigo–Maldon Road; Morris Street, Maldon; Hornsby Street, Maldon; Main Street, Maldon; High Street, Maldon; Newstead Road, Maldon; Anzac Hill Road, Maldon; Mt Tarrengower Road, Maldon; Franklin Street, Maldon		Maldon			Route has many branches around the Maldon area.		
Tourist Drive 44 Fossickers Drive	Calder Highway; Logan–Weddernburn Road; Weddernburn–Dunolly Road; Moliagul–Rheola Road; High Street, Moliagul; Dunolly–Moliagul Road; Dunolly–Bridgewater Road; Wimmera Highway; Bridgewater-Dunolly Road; Calder Highway (II); Inglewood–Rheola Road; Old Kingower Road; Kingower–Wedderburn Road	Wedderburn	Rheola; Moliagul; Dunolly; Tarnagulla; Bridgewater On Loddon; Inglewood			Route is entirely a loop		
Tourist Drive 51 Lake Boga District Drive	Murray Valley Highway; Kunat Street; Kerang Street; Marraboor Street; Station Street; Lalbert Road; Cumnock Road (I); George Road; Wilson Road; Scown Road; Cumnock Road (II); Tresco West Road; Cornish Avenue; Benjeroop–Tresco Road; Ridge Road	Lake Boga	Tresco West	Tresco	16.7 km (10.4 mi)			
Tourist Drive 52 Rural District Drive	Woorinen Road; Lake Road; Church Road; Chillingollah Road (I); Digger Road; Byrnes Road; North South Road (I); Chillingollah Road (II); North South Road (II); Murray Valley Highway; Murraydale Road; River Road; Palaroo Street; Hastings Street; Naretha Street	Swan Hill	Woorinen; Beverford	Swan Hill	44 km (27 mi)			
Tourist Drive 53 Mallee Parks Scenic Route	Hattah-Robinvale Road; Hattah Entrance Road; Mournpall Track; Reed Road; Boonoonar Road	Hattah	Hattah-Kulkyne National Park	Carwarp	51.7 km (32.1 mi)			
Tourist Drive 54 Red Cliffs Tourist Drive	Indi Avenue; Nursery Ridge Road (I); Ovens Avenue; Gum Street; Nursery Ridge Road (II); Woomera Avenue; Wonega Avenue; Pumps Road; Cocklin Avenue; Fitzroy Avenue	Red Cliffs			12.5 km (7.8 mi)	Route starts and terminates in Red Cliffs		
Tourist Drive 61 Rushworth Hidden Treasures Tourist Drive	Vickers Road; Heathcote–Nagambie Road; Nagambie–Rushworth Road (I); Cemetery Track; Reedy Lake Road; Nagambie–Rushworth Road (II); Station Street, Rushworth; Rushworth–Tatura Road; McEwen Road (I); South Boundary Road, Kyabram; Lake Road, Kyabram; Allan Street, Kyabram; McEwen Road (II); Graham Road; Henderson Road; Murray Valley Highway	Nagambie	Bailieston; Whroo; Rushworth; Kyabram; Tongala	Echuca	117 km (73 mi)			
Tourist Drive 62 Gunbower Island Tourist Drive	Gunbower Island Road; Thompsons Bridge Road; McInners Road; Munzel Track; Munroe Track; Frees Road; Cohuna Island Road	Gunbower		Cohuna				
Tourist Drive 63 Living Heritage Tourist Drive	Prairie–Rochester Road; Lockington Road; Echuca–Mitiamo Road	Rochester		Echuca				
Tourist Drive 64 Winery Trail	Emily Street, Seymour; Manse Hill Road, Seymour; Northwood Road; Mitchellstown Road; Mullers Road; Vickers Road; Heathcote–Nagambie Road; Nagambie–Rushworth Road (I); Cemetery Track; Reedy Lake Road; Nagambie–Rushworth Road (II); Station Street, Rushworth; Bendigo–Murchison Road; Rushworth Road, Murchison; Murchison–Goulburn Weir Road; McLeod Street; Kirwans Bridge Road; Lobbs Lane; Grimwade Road; High Street, Nagambie; Odwyer Road; Tabilk–Monea Road; Avenel–Nagambie Road; Bank Street; Queen Street; Ewing Road; Livingstone Street; Henry Street; Seymour–Avenel Road; Goulburn Valley Highway; Emily Street	Seymour	Northwood; Mitchellstown; Nagambie; Bailieston; Whroo; Rushworth; Murchison; Goulburn Weir; Nagambie; Avenel	Seymour		Route is a loop		
Tourist Drive 65 Military Heritage Drive	Emily Street, Seymour; Manse Hill Road, Seymour; Northwood Road; Mitchellstown Road; Mullers Road; Vickers Road; Heathcote–Nagambie Road; Graytown–Rushworth Road; Nagambie-Rushworth Road (I); Cemetery Track; Reedy Lake Road; Nagambie–Rushworth Road (II); Station Street, Rushworth; Bendigo–Murchison Road; Watson Street, Murchison; Willoughby Street, Murchison; Old Weir Road	Seymour	Northwood; Mitchellstown; Nagambie; Graytown; Bailieston; Whroo; Rushworth	Murchison				
Tourist Drive 67 Gold and Ironbark Trail	Cornella-Toolleen Road; Tait Hamiliton Road (I); White Hills Road; Tait Hamiliton Road (II); Nagambie–Rushworth Road	Toolleen	Cornella; Gobarup; Whroo	Rushworth				
Tourist Drive 75 Happy Valley Tourist Drive	Happy Valley Road	Ovens	Ovens; Rosewhite	Ovens	23 km (14mi)		Out and back	Lavender Farm; Wineries; Olive Grove
Tourist Drive 81 Snowy River Country Trail	Buchan-Orbost Road; Gelantipy Road; McKillops Road; Bonang Road; Nicholson Street, Orbost	Orbost	Bonang; McKillops Bridge; Gelantipy; Buchan	Orbost	192km (119mi)	Not suitable for caravans	Loop	
Tourist Drive 91 Walhalla & Mountain Rivers Trail	Lloyd Street, Moe; Waterlook Road, Moe; Moore Street, Moe; Moe–Walhalla Road; Knotts Siding Road, Knotts; Tyers–Walhalla Road; Walhalla Road; Main Road, Walhalla; Main Road, Tyers; Tyers Road	Moe	Erica; Parkers Corner; Knotts; Walhalla; Tyers	Traralgon		Route branches off by Walhalla Road to Walhalla Township Route formally extended to Cowwarr, with a branching from Toongabbie, looping to Cowwarr Weir		
Tourist Drive 92 Bunurong Coastal Drive	Bass Highway; McKenzie Street, Wonthaggi; Graham Street, Wonthaggi; Billson Street, Wonthaggi; Cape Paterson Road; Cape Paterson–Inverloch Road; Surf Parade, Inverloch; Ramsey Boulevard, Inverloch; William Street, Inverloch	Kilcunda	Dalyston; Wonthaggi; Cape Paterson	Inverloch				
Tourist Drive 93 Grand Ridge Road	Grand Ridge Road; Strzelecki Highway; Grand Ridge East Road, Mirboo North; Boolarra South–Mirboo North Road	Seaview	Carrajung; Mirboo North; Seaview	Carrajung	132km (82mi)		Point to point	
Tourist Drive 94 Strzelecki Trail	Hyland Highway; Grand Ridge Road; Traralgon–Balook Road; Traralgon Creek Road; Mattingley Hill Road; Sanders Road; Hazelwood Road; Firmins Lane; Monash Way; Brodribb Road; Yinnar Road; Switchback Road, Hazelwood; Junction Road; Jumbuk Road; Boolarra–Mirboo North Road; Strzelecki Highway; Mirboo North–Trafalgar Road; Morwell–Thorpdale Road; McDonalds Track; Narracan Connection Road; Coalville Road; High Street, Moe; Narracan Drive; John Field Drive, Newborough; Princes Freeway; Commercial Road, Morwell; Princes Highway	Traralgon	Loy Yang Power Station; Gormandale; Carrajung; Balock; Tarra-Bulga National Park; Traralgon South; Hazelwood Power Station; Churchill; Jeeralang Junction; Yinnar; Boolarra; Mirboo North; Thorpdale; Narracan; Moe; Morwell			Route is entirely a loop		
Tourist Drive 95 Tarra Bulga Trail	Woorarra Road; Albert River Road (I); Albert River–Welshpool Road; Albert River Road (II); Grand Ridge Road; Tarra Valley Road	Welshpool	Binginwarri; Stacey's Bridge; Hiawatha; Grand Ridge; Tarra Valley; Devon	Yarram				
Tourist Drive 96 90 Mile Beach Trail	Longford–Loch Sport Road; Longford-Golden Beach Road; Shorline Drive; Seaspray Road; Prospect Road; Owens Lane; Giffard Road; South Gippsland Highway; Woodside Beach Road; Cherry Tree Road	Longford	Dutsun Downs; Loch Sport; Golden Beach; Glomar Beach; The Honeysuckles; Seaspray; Giffard; Golden Beach	Yarram	168km (104mi)		Point to point with multiple spurs	
Tourist Drive 97 Cape Liptrap Trail	Walkerville Road; Walkerville South Road; Cape Liptrap Road; Fish Creek–Walkerville Road; Waratah Road; Meeniyan–Promontory Road	Tarwin Lower	Walkerville; Fish Creek	Tarwin Lower	64km (40mi)		Loop	Heratige Sites Natural Attractions
Tourist Drive 98 Power Drive	Hyland Highway; Mattingley Hill Road; Sanders Road; Hazelwood Road; Firmins Lane; Tramway Road; Switchback Road, Hazelwood; Yinnar Road; Brodribb Road; Monash Way; Commercial Road, Morwell; Princes Freeway; Haunted Hills Road; De Campo Drive; Latrobe River Road; Third Street, Yallorn North; Brown Coalmine Road; Tanjil East Road; Latrobe Road, Morwell	Traralgon	Loy Yang Power Station; Churchill; Hazelwood Power Station; Haunted Hills; Yallourn Power Station; Yallourn North	Morwell				
Major Mitchell Trail		Mildura	Harrow; Portland; Benalla	Howlong	Over 2000km long	The Major Mitchell Trail was signed in 1989. A handbook was created by the Department of Conservation and Environment.		
Goldfields Tourist Route						The Goldfields Tourist Route was signed in 1989. It forms a loop.		
