= Highways in Australia =

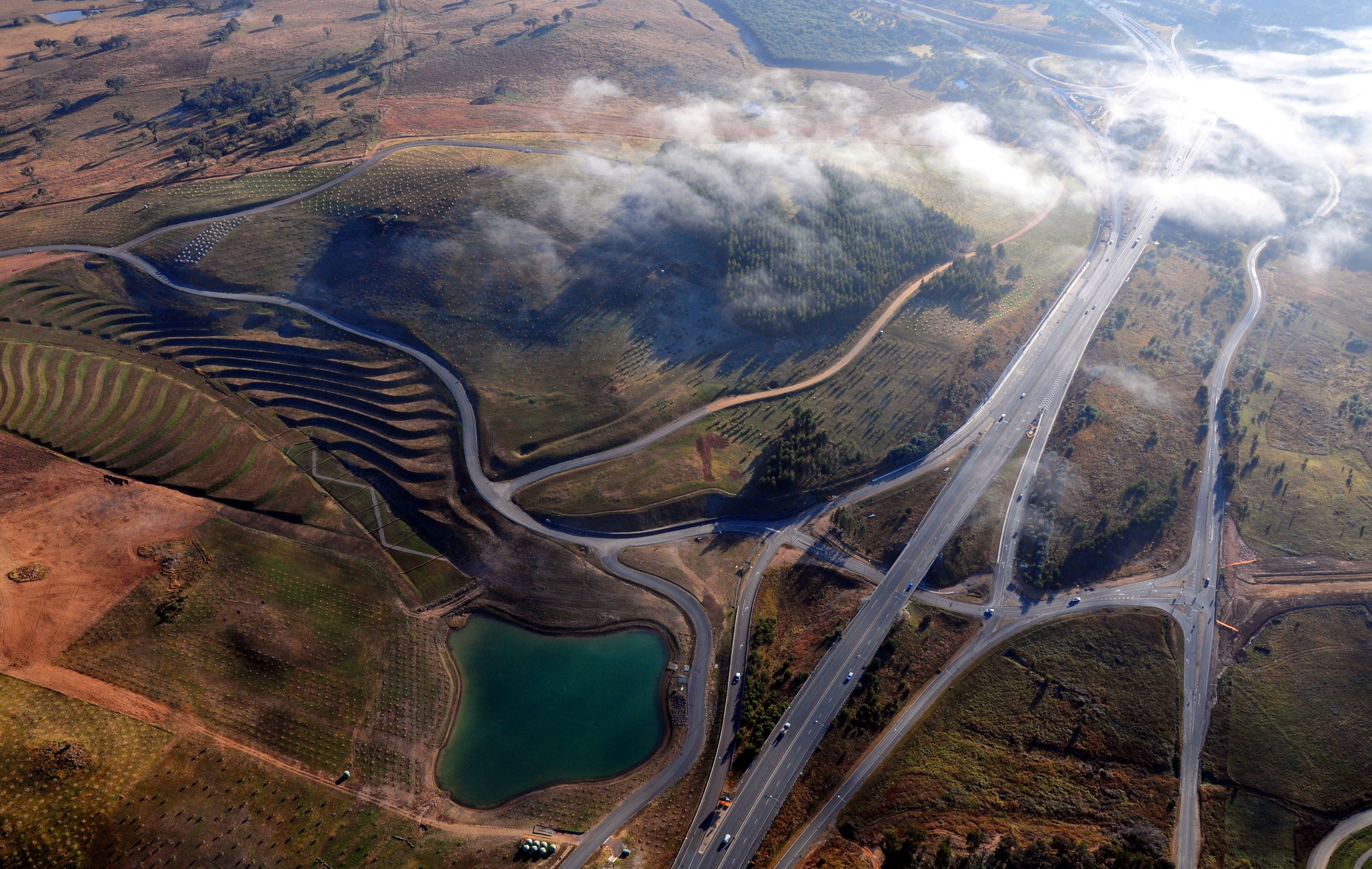
Aerial view of Tuggeranong Parkway in the Australian Capital Territory

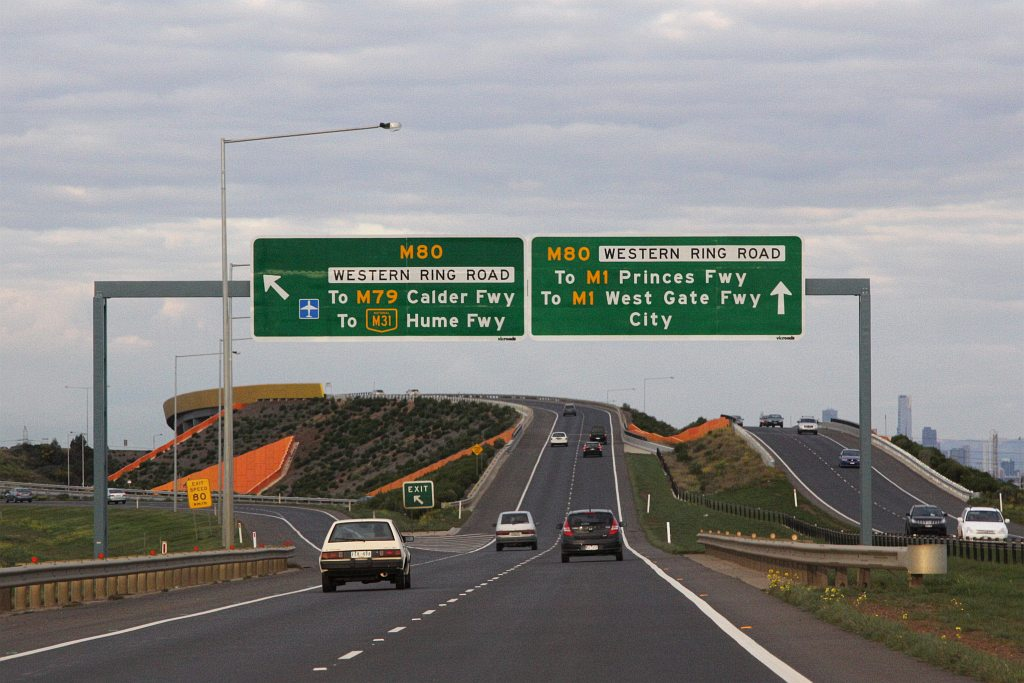
Deer Park Bypass on the Western Freeway in Melbourne, Victoria

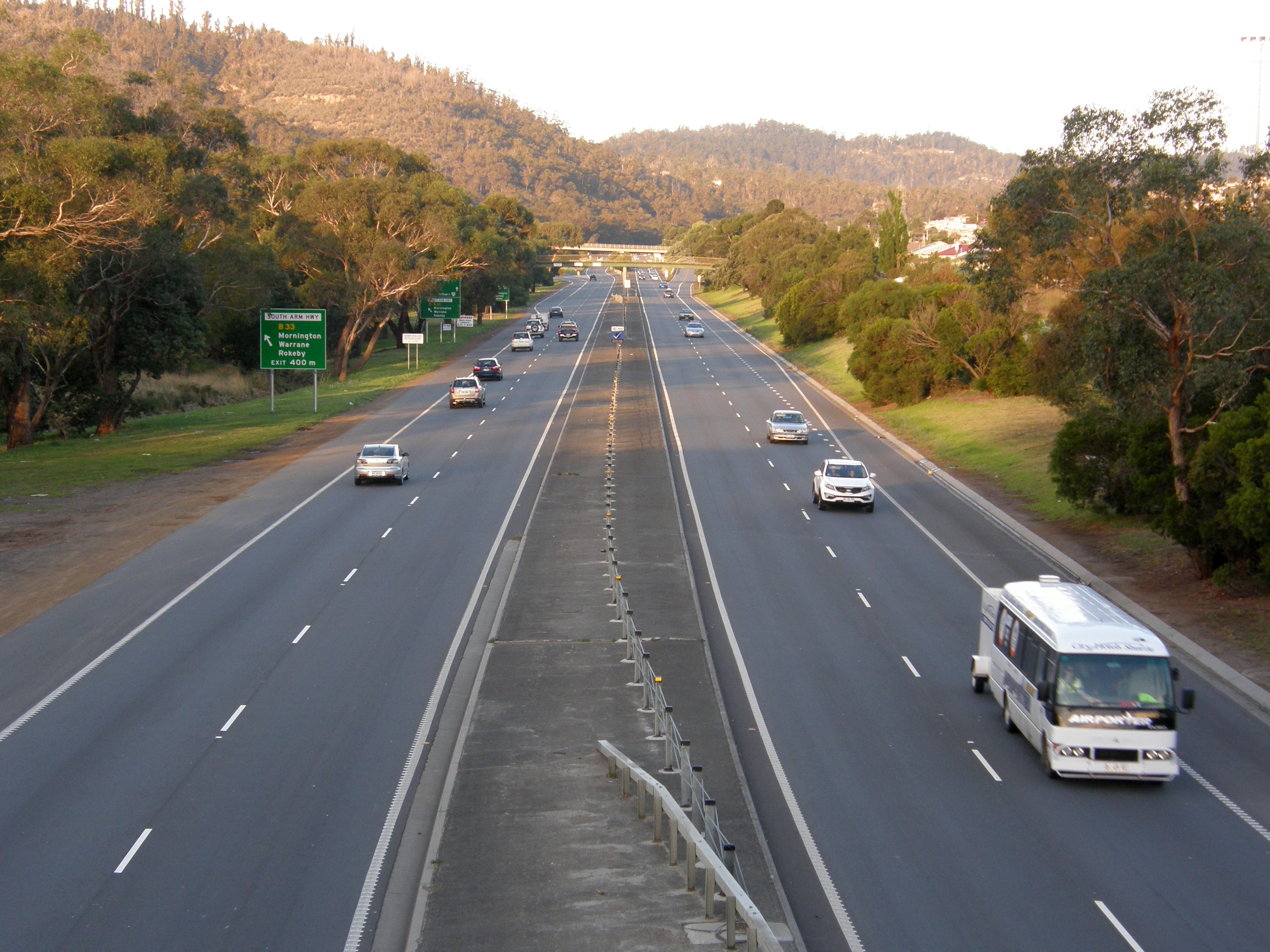
The Tasman Highway in Tasmania

Highways in Australia are generally high capacity roads managed by state and territory government agencies, though Australia's federal government contributes funding for important links between capital cities and major regional centres. Prior to European settlement, the earliest needs for trade and travel were met by narrow bush tracks, used by tribes of Indigenous Australians. The formal construction of roads began in 1788, after the founding of the colony of New South Wales, and a network of three major roads across the colony emerged by the 1820s. Similar road networks were established in the other colonies of Australia. Road construction programs in the early 19th century were generally underfunded, as they were dependent on government budgets, loans, and tolls; while there was a huge increase in road usage, due to the Australian gold rushes. Local government authorities, often known as Road Boards, were therefore established to be primarily responsible for funding and undertaking road construction and maintenance. The early 1900s saw both the increasingly widespread use of motorised transportation, and the creation of state road authorities in each state, between 1913 and 1926. These authorities managed each state's road network, with the main arterial roads controlled and maintained by the state, and other roads remaining the responsibility of local governments. The federal government became involved in road funding in the 1920s, distributing funding to the states. The depression of the 1930s slowed the funding and development of the major road network until the onset on World War II. Supply roads leading to the north of the country were considered vital, resulting in the construction of Barkly, Stuart, and Eyre Highways.

The decades following the war saw substantial improvements to the network, with freeways established in cities, many major highways sealed, development of roads in northern Queensland and Western Australia under the Beef Cattle Roads Grants Acts, and interstate routes between Sydney and Melbourne upgraded. In 1974, the federal government assumed responsibility for funding the nations most important road links, between state and territory capitals cities, which were declared National Highways. Some sections of the 16,000-kilometre-long (9,900 mi) National Highway system were no more than dirt tracks, while others were four lane dual carriageways. The network was gradually improved, and by 1989, all gravel road sections had been sealed. In the following decades, the National Highway system was amended through legislation, and was eventually superseded in 2005 by the broader National Land Transport Network, which included connections to major commercial centres, and intermodal freight transport facilities.

The first route marking system was introduced in the 1950s by the Conference of State Road Authorities, which later became the National Association of Australian State Road Authorities (NAASRA) and then Austroads. National Routes were assigned to significant interstate routes "which, both now and in the future, comprise the more important arteries of road communications throughout Australia in all its aspects". East–west routes were planned to have even numbers, increasing from south to north, while north–south routes would have odd numbers, with numbers increasing from east to west. National Route 1 would be an exception, as a "circumferential route along the coastline of Australia". A state route marking systems was designed to supplement the national system, for inter-regional and urban routes within states. Each state could choose their own numbering scheme, as long as National Route and State Route numbers were not duplicated in the same state, or nearby routes in another state. When the National Highway system was introduced, National Routes along it became National Highway routes with the same numbers, but with distinctive green and gold route markers. During the 1990s, planning began for a new alphanumeric route system. Alphanumeric routes have been introduced in most states and territories in Australia, partially or completely replacing the previous systems.

== History ==
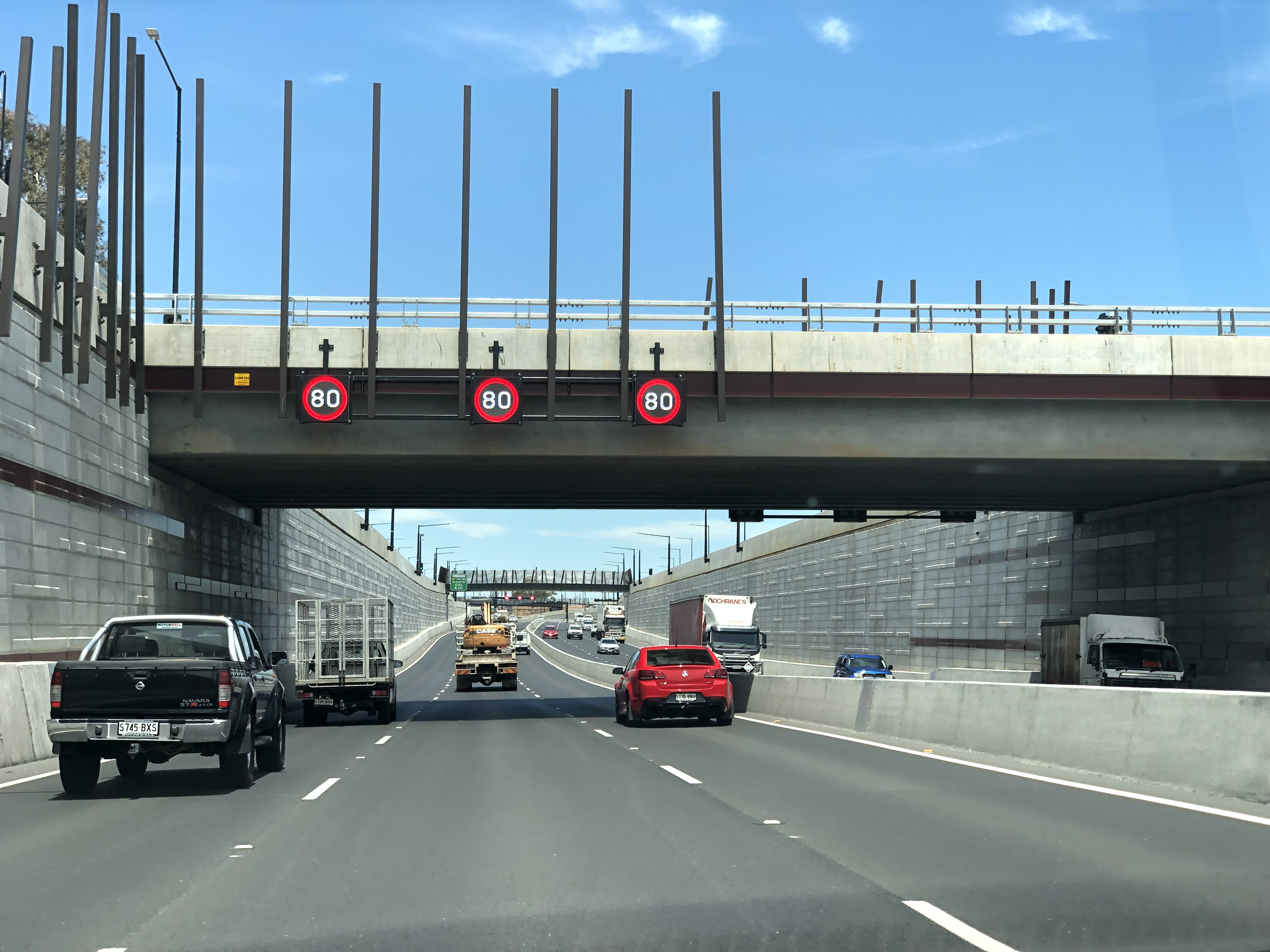
Southbound on the North-South Motorway in Adelaide, South Australia

The earliest needs for trade and travel were met by narrow bush tracks, used by Indigenous Australians prior to European settlement. The formal construction of roads began in 1788, after the founding of the colony of New South Wales. These roads were little more than cleared paths, constructed without grading, drainage systems, and road surfaces. There was no system wide planning for roads, with the Surveyor-General's 1788 proposed town plan dismissed as being too ostentatious; however, the arrival of Governor Macquarie in 1810 led to a planned system for roads and bridges, prior to actual settlement of areas, financed from government funds, public subscription, and tolls. By the end of his term in 1822, the colony had a network of three major roads, with the Great Western Road as the most important link, traversing the Blue Mountains from Sydney to Bathurst. Similar road networks were established in the other colonies of Australia.

Road construction programs in the early 19th century were generally underfunded, as they were dependent on government budgets, loans, tolls and public subscription. This problem was exacerbated by the huge increase in road usage, due to the Australian gold rushes. Local government authorities were therefore established as authorities primarily responsible for funding and undertaking road construction and maintenance. The increasing amount of motorised transportation in the early 1900s lead to another major increase in traffic levels. The vehicles also required higher standard of roads. State road authorities were established in each state between 1913 and 1926. These authorities managed each state's road network, with the main arterial roads controlled and maintained by the state, and other roads remaining the responsibility of local governments. Though legislation differed in each state, highways were generally established as a subset of state controlled roads, which were the most important links between major cities, towns, and regional centres.

The federal government became involved in road funding in the 1920s. The Public Works Act was passed in 1922, which distributed $500,000 to the states according to population levels, conditional on states matching funding on a "dollar for dollar basis". The funds were specifically aimed at maintenance of roads outside of metropolitan cities, and state expenditure needed federal government approval; however, the primary purpose of the act was to reduce unemployment. The Main Roads Development Act of 1923 made $1 million available for road construction, and specific road projects were funded under the Federal Aid Roads Act of 1926. The 1931 Federal Aid Roads Act removed matching conditions, and were less restrictive on the way the money was used due to poor economic conditions resulting from the depression of the 1930s. Funding conditions remained at this lower level until 1959.

The depression of the 1930s slowed the funding and development of the major road network until the onset on World War II. Supply roads leading to the north of the country were considered vital, leading to the construction of Barkly, Stuart, and Eyre highways. Over 960 kilometres of the Stuart Highway, from Tennant Creek to Darwin, was upgraded from an often impassable track to an all-weather sealed highway that could cope with heavy military traffic. The Eyre Highway across the Nullarbor was formed just by grading the surface material.

The decades following the war saw substantial improvements to the network, with freeways established in cities, many major highways sealed, development of roads in northern Queensland and Western Australia under the Beef Cattle Roads Grants Acts. The interstate routes between Sydney and Melbourne were upgraded with the first four lane dual carriageway section of the Hume Highway opening in 1961, and the completed sealing of the Princes Highway between the two cities in 1966. Large mining developments in the Pilbara region of Western Australia were undertaken lead to the improvement of the North West Coastal Highway from Carnarvon to Port Hedland, a project that involved building 30 bridges in a decade.

In 1974, the federal government assumed responsibility for funding the nations most important road links. Under the National Roads Act 1974, the most important roads between state and territory capitals cities were declared National Highways. The federal government fully funded construction and maintenance works undertaken by the states on these roads. The 16,000 kilometres (9,900 mi) of roads included in the original National Highway system varied greatly in quality. Some sections were no more than dirt tracks, whilst others were four lane dual carriageways. While 12,496 kilometres (7,765 mi) was sealed, there was also 3,807 kilometres (2,366 mi) of gravel roads. The National Highway was gradually improved, with the sealed proportion increased from 73 per cent in the early 1970s to 88 per cent by 1981. The sealing works were completed in 1989.

In 1988, the National Highway became redefined under the Australian Land Transport Development (ALTD) Act of 1988, which had various amendments up to 2003. The 1988 Act also defined a category of "Road of National Importance", which were partly funded by federal government. The Introduction of the AusLink (National Land Transport) Act in 2005 superseded the National Highway and Roads of National Importance classifications, which were replaced by the National Land Transport Network. The criteria for inclusion in the network was similar to the previous legislation, but expanded to include connections to major commercial centres, and inter-modal freight transport facilities. All of the roads included in National Land Transport Network as of 2005 were formally defined by regulation in October 2005. Auslink has since been replaced with subsequent legislation under the federal government's Nation Building Program, which includes the National Land Transport Network. The National Highways road routes developed under the former system are still designated as National Highways on route markers and road guidance signs. However, the new alphanumeric route numbering system introduced to New South Wales and the ACT in 2013 does not distinguish between the former National Highways and other routes. VicRoads have, as of September 2013, similarly deprecated the National Highway route marker in favour of standard routes.

The Pacific and Princes Highways labelled as the A1 and M1 between Nowra and Brisbane, as well as the M31 Hume Highway/Remembrance Driveway between Sydney and Melbourne are also part of an ongoing upgrade funded by the Australian, NSW, Victorian and Queensland Governments as the primary route linking the 3 major cities on the East Coast of Australia. Up until the late 1980s, most highways in Australia consisted of single lane, windy roads, especially of those now the B83 Pacific Highway and other roads branching off the current day M1 to major population centres between Sydney and Brisbane. On 20 October 1989, a coach collided with a semi truck in Grafton, NSW. Twenty-one people were killed, and it was dubbed the worst crash in modern Australian motoring history. That titke only stood for a few weeks, as just two months later, on 22 December 1989, two coaches heading in opposite directions on the narrow A1 in Clybucca, near Kempsey, NSW. Thirty-five more people were killed and another 41 were injured. To this day it is the deadliest vehicle crash in Australia. Both accidents were called the 'Twin Tradegies'. Since then, numerous governments have upgraded the roads to be standard dual carriageways. In hilly parts such as the Central Coast and Newcastle region in NSW, a new motorway has been built, and in flatter parts further north, the toad has simply been duplicated, and major towns, like Grafton and Kempsey have been bypassed. The project is mostly complete, except for sections in Hexham, near Newcastle and another in Coffs Harbour, NSW. Both congestion points have bypasses under construction currently.

== Route numbering systems ==
Roads routes in Australia assist drivers navigating roads throughout the country, by identifying important through-routes. The first route marking system was introduced to Australia in the 1950s. National Routes were assigned to significant interstate routes – the most important road links in the country. National Route 1 was designated to a circular route around the Australian coastline. A state route marking system was designed to supplement the national system, for inter-regional and urban routes within states. When the National Highway system was introduced, National Routes along it became National Highway routes with the same numbers, but with distinctive green and gold route markers. Alphanumeric routes were introduced in Tasmania in 1979, and during the 1990s, planning began for nationally consistent route markings, using the alphanumeric system. Alphanumeric routes have been introduced in most states and territories in Australia, partially or completely replacing the previous systems.

Route types currently in use by State/Territory
State/Territory	Alphanumeric	National Highway (alphanumeric)	National Highway (numeric)	National Routes	State Routes	Metroad	Tourist Drive
Australian Capital Territory	Yes	No	No	No	No	No	Partial (Note: The ACT will not be implementing tourist drive markers on new signs but the old signs will not be coverplated.)
New South Wales	Yes	No	No	No	No (Note: However, the NSW extension of the Gold Coast Highway remains signed as State Route 2 for consistency with the Queensland section.)	No	Yes
Northern Territory	Partial (Note: Alphanumeric route markers are introduced only when signs are replaced. However, there are only some routes to be fully signed)	No	Partial (Note: Most signs have been replaced by alphanumeric road routes.)	Partial (Note: The Northern Territory will no longer place new National Highway, Routes or State Routes due to conversion to the alphanumeric system.)	Partial	No	No
Queensland	Yes	Partial (Note: Since September 2013, the National Highway system has been slowly phased out in favour of standard routes. Standard alphanumeric route markers are introduced only when National Highway signs are replaced.)	Partial (Note: QLD's only National Highway has been slowly replaced by alphanumeric markers. However, the change will only appear on new signs)	Yes	Yes	Partial (Note: Most Metroads have been replaced, with only parts of Metroad 2 and 5 remaining. See Metroad#Brisbane Metroads.)	Yes
South Australia	Yes	Partial	No	No	No	No	Yes
Tasmania	Yes	No	Partial (Note: Signage retained on National Highway 1 in Tasmania.)	No	No	No	No
Victoria	Yes	Partial	No	Partial (Note: Signage retained on National Alternative Route 1 in Melbourne.)	Partial (Note: Implementation restricted to Greater Melbourne only as State Routes have been replaced in regional areas. Refer to list of road routes in Victoria (numeric).)	No	Yes
Western Australia	No	No	Yes	Yes	Yes	No	Yes

=== National Routes and Highways ===
Route markers

National Highway 1

National Route 13

State Route 66

In 1955, the Australian National Route Numbering System was introduced to simplify navigation across Australia. The National Route Numbers are marked by white shields that are present in directional signs, distance signs or trailblazers. The general rule was that odd-numbered highways travel in north–south directions and even-numbered highways in east–west directions, with only a few exceptions. National Route 1 was assigned to a network of highways and roads, which together linked all capital cities and coastal towns circumnavigating the mainland. The National Route system initially linked the centres of towns and cities and terminated at the junction of other national routes, however many bypasses have been constructed since then. National Routes often terminated at the metropolitan city limits rather than the individual city centres.

In 1974, the federal government assumed responsibility for funding the nations most important road links, with the introduction of the National Highway. These highways were marked with distinctive green and gold route marker shields instead of the plain National Route shield. Though the National Highway system has been superseded in subsequent legislation, National Highway route markers are still used on many of the routes. Additionally, National Highways and National Routes have been phased out, or are in the process of being phased out, in all states and territories except Western Australia, in favour of the alphanumeric system.

=== State Routes ===
Important urban and inter-regional routes not covered by the National Highway or National Route systems are marked under the State Route system. They can be recognised by blue shield markers. They were practically adopted in all states by the end of the 1980s, and in some states, some less important National Routes were downgraded to State Routes. Each state has or had its own numbering scheme, but do not duplicate National Route numbers in the same state, or nearby routes in another state. As with the National Routes and National Highways, State Routes are being phased out in most states and territories in favour of alphanumeric routes. However, despite the fact that Victoria has fully adopted alphanumeric routes in regional areas, state route numbers are still used extensively within the city of Melbourne as a part of its Metropolitan Route Numbering Scheme.

=== Metroads ===
Metroad route marker; no longer in full use in Brisbane and completely replaced in Sydney

In the 1990s in Sydney and Brisbane, urban route numbering system were streamlined under the Metroad scheme. Metroad route numbers were assigned to the key navigational corridors, along ring and radial routes, and marked by distinctive hexagonal shields. Most Metroads have been partially replaced with alphanumeric routes in Brisbane, and they have been completely replaced in Sydney.

=== Alphanumeric routes ===
Alphanumeric markers

Alphanumeric, National Highway (old signs in QLD, SA and VIC)

Alphanumeric, borderless (ACT, NSW, QLD, SA, TAS & VIC)

Alphanumeric, with border (old signs in ACT and NSW)

Tasmania introduced an alphanumeric route numbering system in 1979, based on the British system from 1963. The new system aimed to upgrade the signing of destinations, including previously unmarked roads, and to simplify navigation by allowing visitors to follow numbered routes. National Highway 1 was retained as the only route without an alphanumeric designation. In the 1990s Victoria and South Australia also overhauled their systems. While South Australia discarded the National and State Route Numbering Systems, those shield-based schemes were retained in the Melbourne metropolitan area as the Metropolitan Route Numbering Scheme. The route numbers used in the alphanumeric schemes were generally inherited from the original National Route Numbering System, with only a few exceptions, and prefixed with letters denoting their grade. For example, Western Freeway is M8 until Ballarat and continues beyond as A8 Western Highway. They are not used extensively in the Melbourne metropolitan area where the blue-shield metropolitan route system is retained for most routes. The National Highways were retained, until 2013, but with the route numbers changed to alphanumeric designations.

New South Wales and the Australian Capital Territory (Note: The only numbered roads in the Australian Capital Territory are interstate highways from NSW and their interconnecting thoroughfares, as the Australian Capital Territory does not number its other highway or freeway grade roads.) introduced the alphanumeric system from early 2013. Before being officially announced, new road signs were fitted with such numbers and then being "coverplated" with the existing route number. However, the new system does not distinguish between the former National Highways and other routes.

Alphanumeric routes have also been introduced for many major highways and urban routes in Queensland, although many other roads retain markers from the National Route, National Highway, State and Metroad numbering systems. According to the New South Wales Roads and Maritime Services, the Northern Territory has similarly begun converting their numbered routes to alphanumeric routes, with a "progressive replacement" scheme that sees alphanumeric route markers introduced only when signs are replaced. At this stage, 4 routes have been fully signed while another one is missing the prefix letter in all of its signs. While there are no immediate plans to introduce an alphanumeric route numbering system in Western Australia, it will begin converting once additional funds become available in the future.

==== Prefix letters ====
In the alphanumeric systems, a letter denoting the route's construction standard and function is prefixed to the route number, creating an alphanumeric route designation. One of six letters may be used:

- "M" routes are primary traffic routes, called motorways in some states. These are typically dual carriageway, freeway-standard highways, but may also be used for rural roads that are nearly at freeway-standard, or at least are dual carriageways.
- "A" routes are other primary highways, including urban arterials and interstate or interregional single carriageways.
- "B" routes are less significant routes, either as an alternative to an "A" or "M" route, or linking smaller population centres to larger regional centres, but without being a major through-route in the region. These are the major road links in areas without "A" routes.
- "C" routes link smaller settlements and towns to the rest of the major road network. They are used for roads without the significance of an "M", "A", or "B" route, but where numbering would assist navigation.
- "D" routes are detour routes, used to direct traffic around sections of the parent route of the same number.
- "R" routes are ring routes only used in South Australia with only one route
- "ALT A" routes are alternative "A" routes only used in Queensland

Alphanumeric prefix letters in use by State/Territory
State/Territory	M -	A -	B -	C -	D -	R -	ALT A -
ACT	Yes	Yes	Yes	No	No	No	No
NSW	Yes	Yes	Yes	No	Yes	No	No
NT	No	Yes	Yes	Yes	No	No	No
QLD	Yes	Yes	No	No	No	No	Yes
SA	Yes	Yes	Yes	Partial (Note: South Australia only uses C routes that connect to Victoria.)	Partial (Note: South Australia has four D routes, but none of them have been signed.)	Yes	No
TAS	No	Yes	Yes	Yes	No	No	No
VIC	Yes	Yes	Yes	Yes	Yes	No	No

== Classification ==
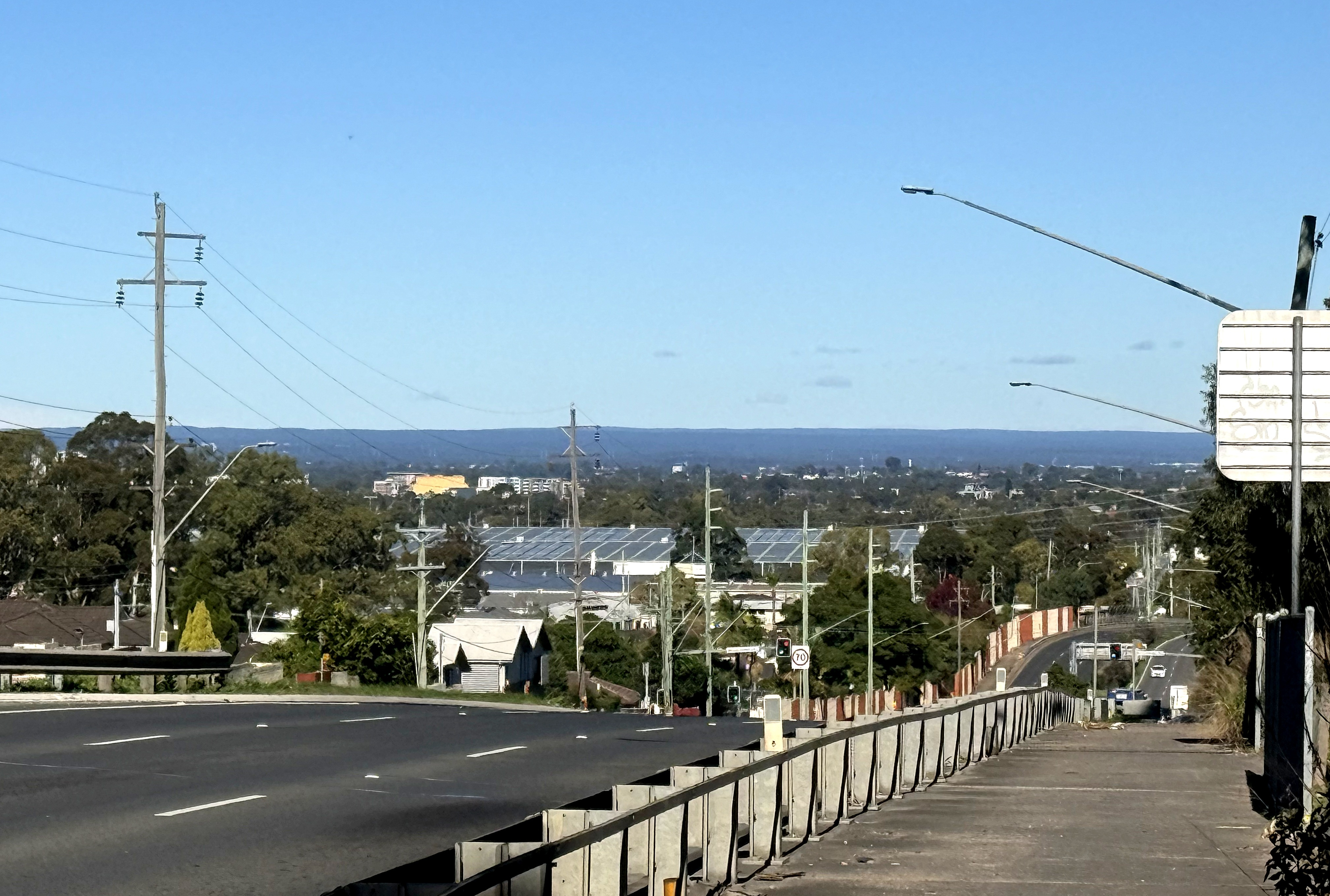
The Betts Road section of Cumberland Highway in Woodpark, Western Sydney

Australia's major roads are managed by the states and territories. While some state road authorities use a road hierarchy with Highway as the highest classification, the classification of state-controlled roads varies between states, with differing classification names, definitions, and number of levels in the hierarchy. Road names do not necessarily correspond to classifications – for example, Great Southern Highway is not classified as a highway. A highway, or other classification level, may be composed of multiple named roads, and a single road name may have varying classifications along its length. Internal numbering schemes for such classifications do not necessarily relate to designated road routes – for example, Great Western Highway is Highway 5 for administrative purposes but is signposted as part of route A32.

=== Australian Capital Territory ===
The ACT classifies its roads into four groups, depending on its physical properties and role within the road network:

- Arterial roads: These roads serve long-distance travellers within or between districts, and support large volumes of traffic. They may be limited access, or controlled-access. A small number of these roads have relatively high levels of property access due to city design requirements at the time.
- Major collector roads: These roads serve local area traffic distributing to or from minor collector roads, and also link to the arterial network. Well designed property access is permissible.
- Minor collector roads: These roads serve neighbourhood traffic, and provide access from the major collector roads into residential areas. Normal direct property access is permissible at this level. Secondary links to the arterial network are possible.
- Access streets: These streets are the lowest road type in the hierarchy, and provide access to the bulk of residential homes.

=== New South Wales ===
In New South Wales, sections 46, 47, 50 and 51 of the Roads Act 1993 provide for the classifications of Highway, Main Road, Secondary Road or Tourist Road.

=== Northern Territory ===
In the Northern Territory, major roads are classified into three categories: National Highway, Arterial Roads, and Secondary Roads.

=== Queensland ===
In Queensland, roads are classified as: National Network Roads, State Strategic Roads, Regional Roads, or District Roads.

=== South Australia ===
South Australia's Department of Planning, Transport and Infrastructure (DPTI) classifies state-controlled roads into three categories: National Land Transport Network; DPTI Maintained Road, Sealed; and DPTI Maintained Road, Unsealed.

=== Tasmania ===
In Tasmania, the most important state and regional connections, totalling 3,650 kilometres (2,270 mi), are state-owned roads, which are further classified into a road hierarchy. The hierarchy consists of:

- Trunk roads – major highways which are the "primary freight and passenger roads"
- Regional freight roads – regional roads which connect heavy freight to the trunk roads
- Regional access roads – providing access to Tasmania's Regions, with less traffic than trunk and regional freight roads
- Feeder roads – connect population centres and tourist traffic to and from the rest of the state road network
- Other roads – lower traffic roads, primarily providing access to private properties

=== Victoria ===
In Victoria, major roads are designated as either freeways (including tollways) or arterial roads (including other tolled roads), under section 17 subsection 1 of the Road Management Act 2004, and under the same act, section 14 subsection 1, VicRoads is named as the controlling authority in designating major roads as either freeways or arterial roads.

=== Western Australia ===
In Western Australia, roads controlled and maintained by the state road authority, Main Roads Western Australia, are either highways or Main Roads. Any road or section of road may be proclaimed a highway by the Governor of Western Australia, on the recommendation of the Commissioner of Main Roads, under Section 13 of the Main Roads Act 1930. Section 14 of the act allows for the creation of new highways. As well as this legal classification scheme, Main Roads Western Australia also classifies roads by the following functional hierarchy:

- Primary Distributor: Provide for major regional and inter-regional traffic movement and carry large volumes of generally fast moving traffic. They are managed by Main Roads Western Australia.
- Regional Distributor: Roads that are not primary distributors, but which link significant destinations and are designed for efficient movement of people and goods within and beyond regional areas. They are managed by local government.
- District Distributor: Roads that run between built up area land-use cells and generally not through them, forming a grid which would ideally space them about 1.5 kilometres apart. They are managed by local government.
- Local Distributor: Roads that carry traffic within a cell and link district distributors or primary distributors at the boundary, to access roads. The route of local distributors should discourage through traffic so that the cell formed by the grid of higher order distributor roads, only carries traffic belonging to, or serving the area. In rural areas local distributors connect to other rural distributors and to rural access roads.
- Access Road: Provide access to abutting properties with safety aspects having priority over the vehicle movement function. In urban areas, these roads are bicycle and pedestrian friendly, with aesthetics and amenity also important. Access roads are managed by local government.

Other classifications processes exist for planning, administrative, financial, and asset management purposes.

== Federally funded highways ==
The federal government contributes funding for the following road links, which make up the national road network, under the Nation Building Program.

- Sydney to Melbourne – Hume Highway/Freeway/Motorway
- Sydney to Brisbane – the Pacific Motorway (Sydney–Newcastle), New England and Cunningham Highways route and the Pacific Highway route
- Brisbane to Cairns – Bruce Highway
- Brisbane to Darwin – Warrego, Landsborough, Barkly and Stuart Highways
- Brisbane to Melbourne – Warrego, Gore, Newell and Goulburn Valley Highways and Hume Freeway
- Melbourne to Adelaide – Western Highway/Freeway, Dukes Highway and South Eastern Freeway
- Adelaide to Darwin – Port Wakefield Road, Augusta Highway and Stuart Highway
- Adelaide to Sydney – Sturt and Hume Highway/Motorway
- Adelaide to Perth – Port Wakefield Road, Augusta, Eyre, Coolgardie–Esperance (part) and Great Eastern Highways
- Perth to Darwin – Great Northern, Victoria and Stuart Highways
- Sydney to Canberra – Hume Highway/Motorway and Federal Highways
- Melbourne to Canberra – Hume Highway/Freeway and Barton Highways
- Hobart to Burnie including the link from Launceston to Bell Bay – Brooker, Midlands and the Bass Highway
- Townsville to Mount Isa – Flinders Highway
- Melbourne to Sale – Princes Highway
- Perth to Bunbury – Kwinana Freeway and Forrest Highway
- Melbourne to Mildura – Calder Highway/Freeway
- Sydney to Dubbo – Great Western and Mitchell Highways
- Sydney to Wollongong – Princes Motorway and Princes Highway
- Melbourne to Geelong – Princes Highway
- Perth to Geraldton – Tonkin and Brand Highways
- Port Hedland to Karratha – North West Coastal Highway (part)

== See also ==
Highways by state/territory:

- List of highways in the Australian Capital Territory
- List of highways in New South Wales
- List of highways in the Northern Territory
- List of highways in Queensland
- List of highways in South Australia
- List of highways in Tasmania
- List of highways in Victoria
- List of highways in Western Australia

Road routes by state/territory:

- List of road routes in the Australian Capital Territory
- List of road routes in New South Wales
- List of road routes in the Northern Territory
- List of road routes in Queensland
- List of road routes in South Australia
- List of road routes in Tasmania
- List of road routes in Victoria
- List of road routes in Western Australia

Related concepts and lists:

- Freeways in Australia
- Highway 1 (Australia)
- National Highway (Australia)
- Transport in Australia
- Road transport in Australia
- Toll roads in Australia
- List of highways in Australia
- List of Australian airports
- List of Australian ports
