= Beach Road, Melbourne =

Road in Melbourne, Victoria

Beach Road (numerous constituent roads) Victoria
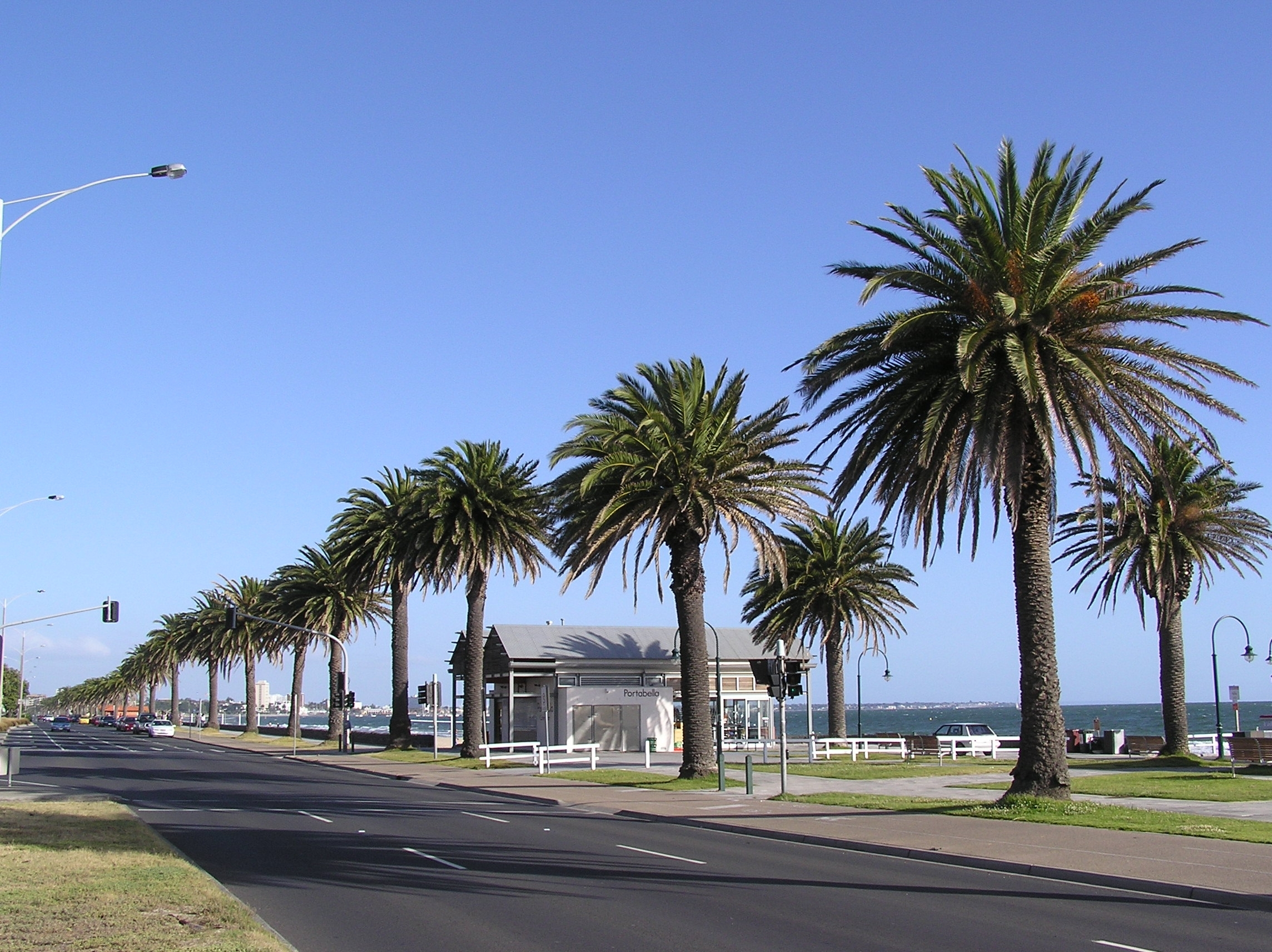
- Albert Park foreshore, near Beaconsfield Parade
- Coordinates: 37.843166°S 144.938128°E (Northwest end); 38.008422°S 145.087855°E (Southeast end)

General information
- Type: Road
- Length: 26.9 km (17 mi)
- Gazetted: May 1935
- Route number(s): Metro Route 33 (1965–present)
- Former route number: Metro Route 26 (1965–1989) (Port Melbourne–Albert Park)

Major junctions
- Northwest end: Bay Street; Port Melbourne
- Kerferd Road; Fitzroy Street; Barkly Street; North Road; South Road; Bluff Road; Balcombe Road; Warrigal Road
- Southeast end: Nepean Highway; Mordialloc, Melbourne

Location(s)
- Major suburbs: St Kilda, Sandringham, Black Rock, Beaumaris

Beach Road is a coastal suburban road in Melbourne, Australia that runs along the northeastern shore of Port Phillip Bay, from Bay Street in Port Melbourne to its southern point in Mordialloc. This name covers many consecutive streets and is not widely known to most drivers except for the southernmost section, as the entire allocation is still best known as by the names of its constituent parts: Beach Street, Beaconsfield Parade, Jacka Boulevard, Marine Parade, Ormond Esplanade, St Kilda Street, Esplanade and Beach Road proper. This article will deal with the entire length of the corridor for sake of completion.

Beach Road is extremely popular with cyclists. While the Bayside Trail follows the road closely, cyclists with racing bicycles usually use the road itself. According to Bicycle Victoria, over 7,000 riders were recorded using the road on one Saturday in September 2008 . Numerous cycling clubs and less formal groups use the road for training sessions for road racing and triathlon. Cycling advocacy groups are presently campaigning for the removal of on-street parking on weekend mornings. Beach Road has also been the subject of a local council and community campaign to limit truck traffic.

== Route ==
Beach Road starts as Beach Street at the intersection with Bay Street in Port Melbourne (just east of Princes Pier) and heads southeast as a dual carriageway road, changing name to Beaconsfield Parade shortly after (near the Port Melbourne Life Saving Club) and running along the foreshore of the beach along Port Phillip Bay for the next 4 km (2.5 mi). At the intersection with Fitzroy Street at St Kilda, it changes name to Jacka Boulevard and runs past the St Kilda Sea Baths and southern edge of Luna Park, where it changes name again to Marine Parade, still following the coast. It intersects with Barkly Street and Glen Huntly Road just east of Point Ormond, changing name again to Ormond Esplanade, and narrowing to a four-lane single carriageway. At the northern edge of Brighton it intersects with and changes name to St. Kilda Street, running south through the suburbs of western Brighton, rejoining the coast outside Royal Brighton Yacht Club and changing name again to Esplanade. It continues further south along the coast until the intersection with South Road just outside Brighton Beach railway station, where it changes name for the final time as Beach Road, running along the beaches through Sandringham, Black Rock and Mentone before eventually terminating at Nepean Highway at Mordialloc.

== History ==
The passing of the Highways and Vehicles Act 1924 through the Parliament of Victoria provided for the declaration of State Highways and Main Roads, roads partially financed by the State government through the Country Roads Board (later VicRoads). Beach Road was declared a Main Road in May 1935, from South Road in Brighton to Nepean Highway in Mordialloc. After the passing of the Country Roads Act 1958 (itself an evolution from the original Highways and Vehicles Act 1924), the declaration was extended north on 7 September 1960, from Bay Street in Port Melbourne, along Beach Street, Beaconsfield Parade, Lower Esplande (later renamed to Jacka Boulevard), Marine Parade, Ormond Esplanade, St Kilda Street and Esplanade to join with Beach Road proper, but roads within this northern extension were still sign-posted as its constituent parts.

Beach Road (including all its constituent roads) was signed as Metropolitan Route 33 between Port Melbourne and Mordialloc in 1965. Metropolitan Route 26 previously ran concurrent along Beaconsfield Parade and Beach Street from Kerferd Road at Albert Park, past Bay Street at Port Melbourne eventually along Howe Parade to Williamstown Road; Metropolitan Route 26 was later truncated to terminate at Kerferd Road and Beaconsfield Parade in 1989.

The passing of the Road Management Act 2004 granted the responsibility of overall management and development of Victoria's major arterial roads to VicRoads: in 2004, VicRoads re-declared the road as Beach Road (Arterial #5840), from Bay Street in Port Melbourne to Nepean Highway in Mordialloc, however the road is still presently known (and signposted) as its constituent parts.

== Major intersections ==
LGA	Location	km	mi	Destinations	Notes
Port Phillip	Port Melbourne	0.0	0.0	Beach Street (north) – Port Melbourne	Northern terminus of Beach Road (declared)
Port Phillip	Port Melbourne	0.0	0.0	Bay Street (Metro Routes 30/33 east) – South Melbourne, Southbank	Metro Route 33 heads east along Bay Street
Port Phillip	Port Melbourne	0.3	0.19	Esplanade East – Port Melbourne	Southern end of Beach Street; Northern end of Beaconsfield Parade
Port Phillip	Albert Park	1.3	0.81	Kerferd Road (Metro Road 26) – South Melbourne, Toorak, Belgrave	
Port Phillip	St Kilda West–St Kilda boundary	3.8	2.4	Fitzroy Street – St Kilda	Entrance and exit via Acland Street; Southern end of Beaconsfield Parade; Northern end of Jacka Boulevard
Port Phillip	St Kilda	4.6	2.9	Cavell Street – St Kilda, Luna Park	Southern end of Jacka Boulevard; Northern end of Marine Parade
Elster Creek		5.7	3.5	Bridge over river (name unknown)	
Port Phillip	Elwood	6.1	3.8	Barkly Street (Metro Route 29 north) – St Kilda, Collingwood, Epping; Glen Huntly Road (east) – Elsternwick, Glen Huntly	Southern end of Marine Parade; Northern end of Ormond Esplanade
Port Phillip–Bayside boundary	Elwood–Brighton boundary	7.6	4.7	St Kilda Street (north) – Elsternwick	Southern end of Ormond Eplanade; Northern end of St Kilda Street
Bayside	Brighton	8.4	5.2	North Road (Metro Road 18 east, unallocated west) – Ormond, Mulgrave, Clematis	
Bayside	Brighton	9.7	6.0	Grosvenor Street – Brighton	Southern end of St Kilda Street; Northern end of Esplanade
Bayside	Brighton	11.8	7.3	South Road (Metro Road 14) – Moorabbin, Noble Park, Harkaway	Southern end of Esplanade; Northern end of Beach Road (sign-posted)
Bayside	Brighton–Hampton boundary	12.5	7.8	New Street (Metro Road 25) – Elsternwick, Prahran	Entrance northbound into and exit southbound from New Street only
Bayside	Sandringham	14.9	9.3	Bay Road – Highett, Westfield Southland	
Bayside	Black Rock	17.9	11.1	Bluff Road (Metro Route 19 north) – Brighton East, Malvern, Kew; Balcombe Road (Metro Route 10 east) – Mentone, Keysborough, Dandenong	
Kingston	Mentone–Parkdale boundary	24.4	15.2	Warrigal Road (Metro Route 15) – Mentone, Oakleigh, Surrey Hills	
Kingston	Mordialloc	26.9	16.7	Nepean Highway (Metro Route 3) – St Kilda, Frankston, Portsea	Southern terminus of Metro Route 33 and Beach Road
1.000 mi = 1.609 km; 1.000 km = 0.621 mi: Incomplete access; Route transition
