= Doncaster–Eltham Road =

Road in Melbourne, Australia

Doncaster–Eltham Road Fitzsimons Lane, Williamsons Road Victoria
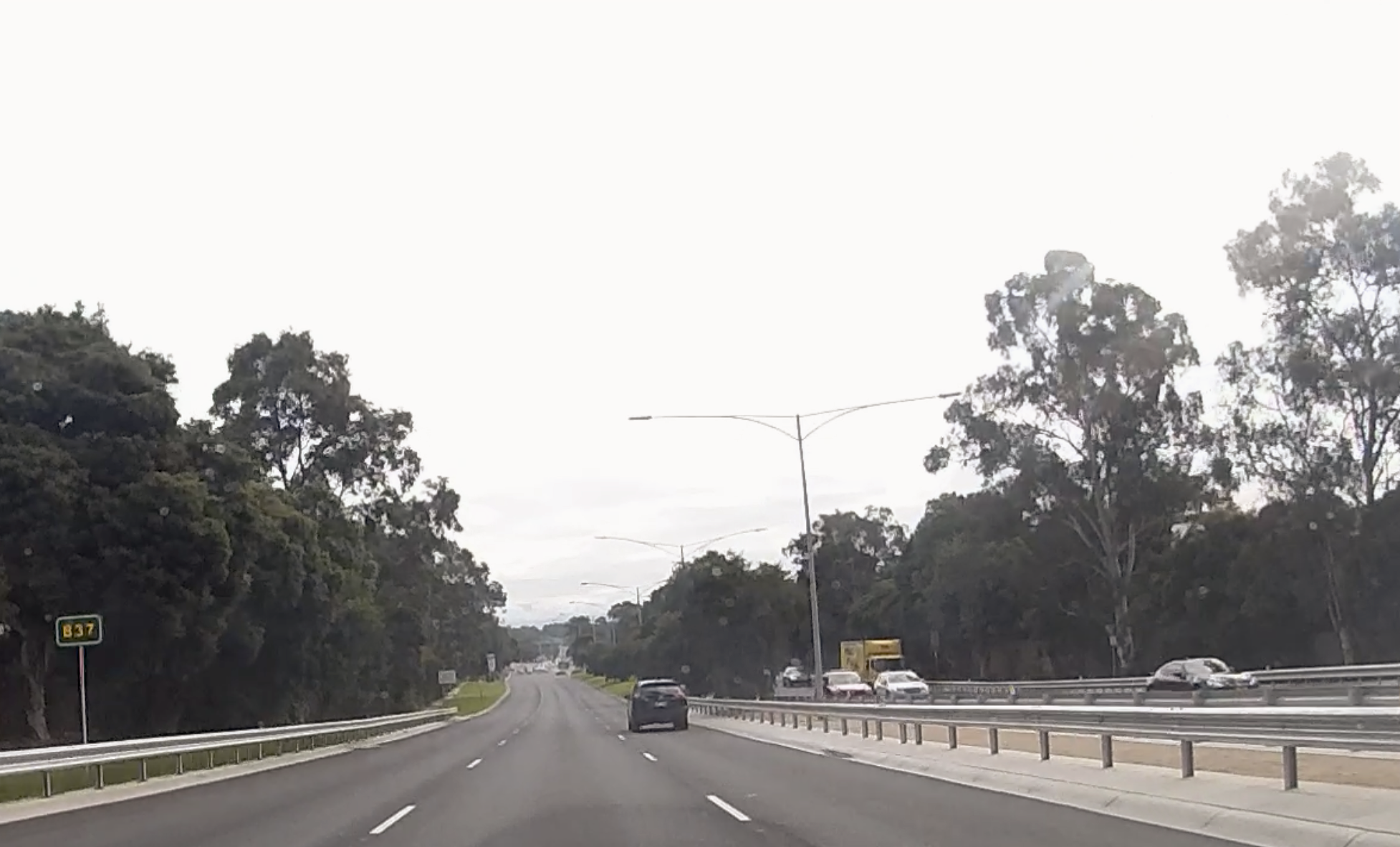
- Williamsons Road, looking northbound towards Porter Street in 2023.
- Coordinates: 37.733104°S 145.137403°E (North end); 37.779556°S 145.123147°E (South end)

General information
- Type: Road
- Length: 5.6 km (3.5 mi)
- Route number(s): B37 (2022–present) (Eltham–Templestowe); Metro Route 47 (1989–present) (Templestowe–Doncaster); Concurrencies: Metro Route 42 (1989–present) (within Templestowe)
- Former route number: Metro Route 47 (1989–2022) (Eltham–Templestowe); Metro Route 48 (1965–1989) Entire route

Major junctions
- North end: Main Road; Eltham, Melbourne
- Porter Street; Foote Street
- South end: Manningham Road; Williamsons Road; Doncaster, Melbourne

Location(s)
- Major suburbs: Lower Plenty, Templestowe, Templestowe Lower

Doncaster–Eltham Road is a major arterial road in the north-eastern suburbs of Melbourne, Victoria, Australia. This name is not widely known to most drivers, as the entire allocation is still best known as by the names of its constituent parts: Fitzsimons Lane and Williamsons Road. This article will deal with the entire length of the corridor for sake of completion, as well to avoid confusion between declarations.

The road is a major transportation link, with Fitzsimons Lane being one of the only major river crossings of the Yarra River in the eastern suburbs and carries upwards of 50,000 vehicles each day.

== Route ==
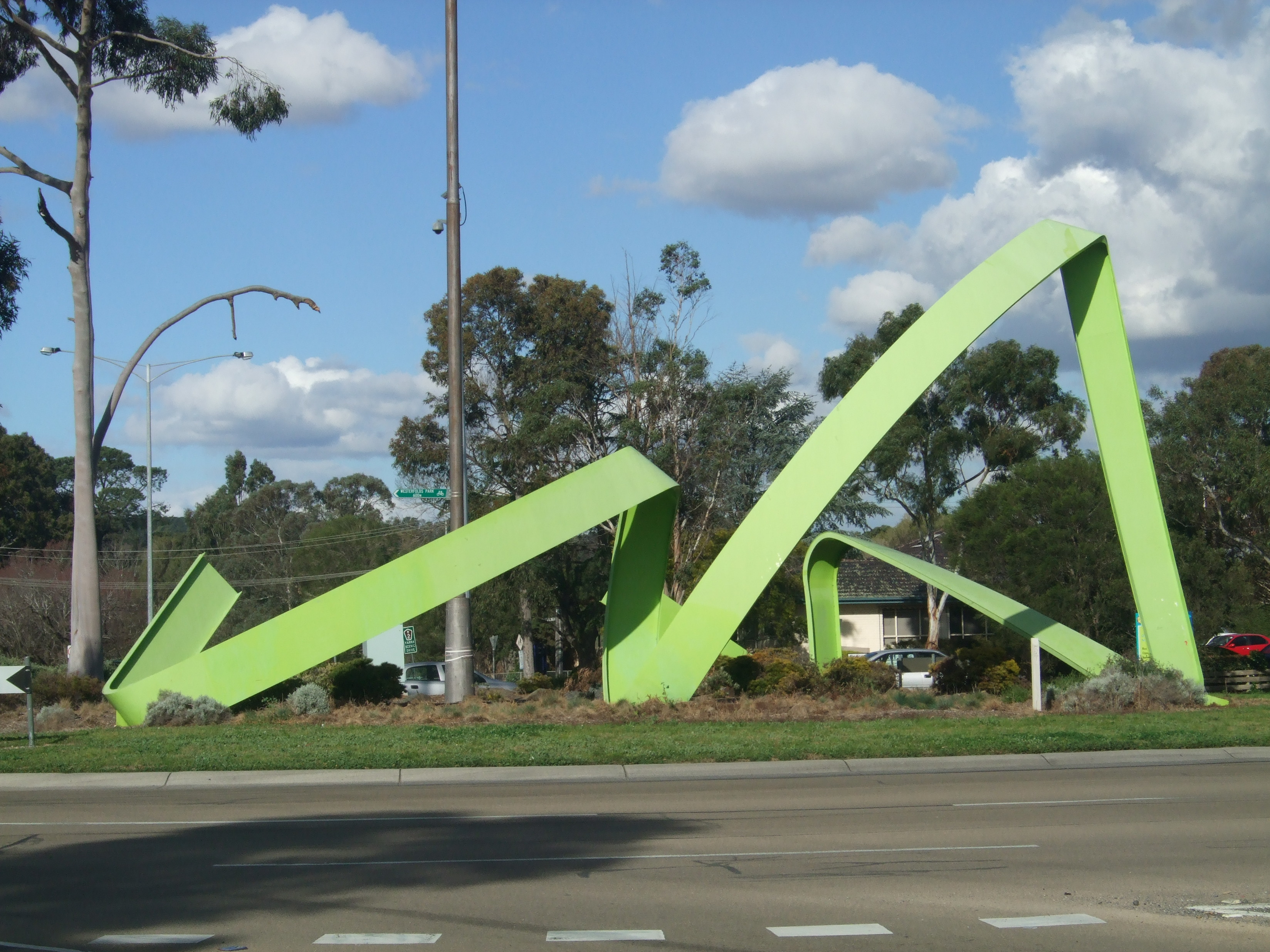
The 'River Peel' structure, previously part of the Fitzsimons Lane and Porter Street intersection. This structure has now been moved further north since the elimination of this roundabout and the installation of traffic lights.

Fitzsimons Lane begins at the intersection with Main Road just north of the Yarra River in Eltham. Here it is a six-lane, divided road with a speed limit of 70 km/h (43 mph), with the speed limit increasing to 80 km/h (50 mph) and the road reducing to four lanes shortly after heading south and before crossing the Yarra River. After the Yarra River, it gains an extra lane southbound (previously used as a bus lane but opened up to all traffic to improve traffic flow) and also provides access to the nearby Westerfolds Park. To the eastern side just after the Yarra River crossing is the iconic structure officially known as the 'River Peel', but far more commonly known to locals as 'The Apple Peel'. This structure was previously part of the roundabout intersection with Porter Street but since 2022 has been moved to its current location, due to the elimination of the roundabout as part of the Fitzsimons Lane upgrades. Travelling further south the road intersects with Porter Street which provides access to Templestowe shops in the west and Warrandyte in the east, following the Yarra Scenic Drive (Tourist Route 2).

South of the Porter Street intersection, the road is known as Williamsons Road and carries six lanes of traffic until Foote Street, where it again reduces to four lanes until the roads southern terminus (although the King Street intersection briefly increases to six lanes on approaches to intersection). With the exceptions of traffic light intersections at Foote Street, Lynwood Parade/King Street, The Aquarena Aquatic Centre and George Street, there are minimal intersecting roads with limited access to local streets; this section has a speed limit of 80 km/h (50 mph). Between Foote Street and King Street, the road climbs, descends then climbs a steep grade, which often causes congestion in peak hour. Doncaster–Eltham Road then terminates at the intersection with Manningham Road, which continues south past Westfield Doncaster but is still locally known as Williamsons Road.

== History ==
Previous to the construction of the Fitzsimons Lane bridge, nearby existing crossings of the Yarra River were Banksia Street in Heidelberg, or Warrandyte Bridge in Warrandyte; construction of this bridge shortened a 12-mile (19 km) journey between Eltham and Templestowe to just 3 miles (4.8 km) once completed. The Country Roads Board (later VicRoads) completed reinforced concrete piers and abutments for a bridge over the Yarra River, connecting Fitzsimons Lane on the southern bank to Main Road on the northern bank, in the 1959/60 financial year, with a contract let for the fabrication of the bridge's steel girders. The bridge, at 276 feet (84 m) long by 28 feet (8.5 m) wide with 6 feet (1.8 m) footways, constructed of reinforced concrete and welded steel plate girder construction, was officially opened 13 October 1961 by Board chairman Donald Victor Darwin. Williamsons Road was extended further north from Foote Street to Porter Street, to link directly with Fitzsimons Lane and bypass the traffic route through Templestowe at the time (along Porter and Anderson Streets and Serpells Road), in the mid-1970s. The bridge was duplicated in December 1991, with duplication of the road between Porter Street and Rosehill Road for a total cost of $6.2 million.

Fitzsimons Lane was signed as Metropolitan Route 48 between Eltham and Doncaster in 1965, originally following the deviation through Templestowe and then south along Williamsons Road to the intersection with Manningham Road; this was re-routed away from Templestowe when the Williamsons Road extension opened in the mid-1970s. Metropolitan Route 48 was replaced along the entire corridor by Metropolitan Route 47 in 1989. In 2022 with the completion of major works of the Fitzsimons Lane upgrades, B37 has replaced Metropolitan Route 47 between Main Road and Foote Street.

The Country Roads Board (later VicRoads) declared Doncaster–Eltham Road a Main Road in June 1983, from Eltham-Yarra Glen Road (today Main Road) in Eltham to Manningham Road in Doncaster; all roads were known (and signposted) as their constituent parts.

The passing of the Road Management Act 2004 granted the responsibility of overall management and development of Victoria's major arterial roads to VicRoads: in 2004, VicRoads declared Doncaster–Eltham Road (Arterial #5901) from Eltham-Yarra Glen Road (today Main Road) in Eltham to Manningham Road in Doncaster; as before, all roads are known (and signposted) as their constituent parts.

Between 2021 and 2023 the road received major upgrades, in an effort to reduce bottlenecks at some key intersections where cars would often queue for kilometres. The Fitzsimons Lane Upgrade replaced the roundabouts at Main Road and Porter Street with traffic lights, as well as upgrading the existing Foote Street intersection and adding an extra lane between Porter Street and Foote Street. Major construction was completed in 2022 with minor works continuing into 2023.

== Major intersections ==
LGA	Location	km	mi	Destinations	Notes
Banyule–Nillumbik border	Montmorency–Lower Plenty–Eltham tripoint	0.0	0.0	Main Road (Metro Route 44) – Heidelberg, Eltham, Kangaroo Ground	Northern terminus of road (declared) and route B37; Northern end of Fitzsimons Lane (sign-posted)
Banyule–Nillumbik border	Lower Plenty–Eltham border	0.6	0.37	Rosehill Road (west) – Lower Plenty; Homestead Road (east) – Eltham	Northbound entrance to and exit from Rosehill Road only Southbound entrance to and exit from Homestead Road only
Banyule–Nillumbik–Manningham tripoint	Lower Plenty–Eltham–Templestowe tripoint	1.0	0.62	Bridge over Yarra River	
Manningham	Templestowe	2.3	1.4	Porter Street (Metro Route 42 east/Tourist Route 2 west, east) – Heidelberg, Warrandyte	Northern terminus of concurrency with Metro Route 42; Southern end of Fitzsimons Lane, northern end of Willamsons Road (sign-posted)
Manningham	Templestowe	3.1	1.9	Foote Street (Metro Routes 42 west/52 west, east) – Balwyn North, Bulleen, Donvale	Southern terminus of concurrency with Metro Route 42; Southern terminus of route B37; Northern terminus of Metro Route 47
Manningham	Templestowe	3.4	2.1	Serpells Road – Templestowe, Doncaster East	Northbound entrance to and exit from Serpells Road westbound only Southbound entrance to and exit from Serpells Road eastbound only
Manningham	Templestowe Lower–Doncaster border	4.3	2.7	Lynnwood Parade (west) – Templestowe Lower; King Street (east) – Doncaster East	
Manningham	Templestowe Lower–Doncaster border	5.3	3.3	George Street – Templestowe Lower, Doncaster East	
Manningham	Templestowe Lower–Doncaster border	5.6	3.5	Manningham Road (Metro Route 40 northwest) – Heidelberg, Coburg; Williamsons Road (Metro Routes 40/47 south) – Edithvale, Huntingdale	Southern terminus of road (declared), Metro Route 47 continues south along Williamsons Road
1.000 mi = 1.609 km; 1.000 km = 0.621 mi: Concurrency terminus; Incomplete access; Route transition
