= Gil Gil =

Gil Gil Victoria
- Coordinates: 36°17′43″S 143°2′9″E
- Population: 23 (2021 census)
- Postcode(s): 3480
- LGA(s): Shire of Buloke
- State electorate(s): Mildura
- Federal division(s): Mallee

Gil Gil is a locality in the Shire of Buloke, Victoria, Australia.

== See also ==
- List of reduplicated Australian place names
