= John Stephenson =

John Stephenson may refer to:

== Politicians ==
- John Stephenson (MP died 1794) (c. 1709–1794), British merchant and politician
- John Gould Stephenson (1828–1883), American politician and Librarian of Congress
- John Bernard Stephenson (1938–1982), Jamaican lawyer and member of parliament
- John Stephenson (MP for Hythe) (fl.1571), English MP

== Sports ==
- John Stephenson (baseball) (born 1941), American baseball catcher
- John Stephenson (cricketer, born 1903) (1903–1975), English cricketer
- John Stephenson (cricketer, born 1907) (1907–1982), English cricketer
- John Stephenson (cricketer, born 1965), English Test cricketer
- John Stephenson (South African cricketer) (born 1955), South African cricketer
- John Stephenson (footballer, born 1881) (1881–1940), Australian rules footballer for Carlton
- John Stephenson (footballer, born 1883) (1883–1963), Australian rules footballer for Essendon
- John Stephenson (footballer, born 1896) (1896–1976), English footballer
- Jack Stephenson (John Samuel Stephenson, 1900–1981), Australian rules footballer for Carlton
- Jackie Stephenson (1899–1969), English footballer
- John Stephenson (footballer, born 1937) (1937–2014), Australian rules footballer for Carlton
- John A. Stephenson, English rower

== Others ==
- John Stephenson (director) (born 1952), British film director
- John Stephenson (actor) (1923–2015), American actor
- John Stephenson (coachbuilder) (1809–1893), Irish-American coachbuilder who created the street railway
- Chiripula Stephenson (John Edward Stephenson, 1873 or 1876–?), founder of Ndola
- John Stephenson (judge) (1910–1998), English barrister and judge, Lord Justice of Appeal
- John Stephenson (physician) (1796–1842), Canadian physician and a co-founder of McGill University Faculty of Medicine
- John Stephenson (zoologist) (1871–1933), British surgeon and zoologist
- John Atlantic Stephenson (1829–?), Tyneside businessman and poet
- John B. Stephenson (1937–1994), Appalachian scholar and president of Berea College
- John Robin Stephenson (1931–2003), Lieutenant Colonel of the British Army and Secretary of the Marylebone Cricket Club
- John W. Stephenson (1888–1960), English trade union leader
- Seán Mac Stíofáin (1928–2001), Irish republican (born John Edward Drayton Stephenson)

== See also ==
- John Stevenson (disambiguation)
- Jonathan Stephenson (1950–2011), Irish politician
- John Steffensen (born 1982), Australian athlete
- Jon Stephensen (born 1959), Danish journalist and politician
