= John Stevenson =

John Stevenson may refer to:

== Entertainment ==
- John Andrew Stevenson (1761–1833), Irish composer
- Steve Brodie (actor) (John Stevenson, 1919–1992), American actor
- John Stevenson (writer) (1930–2017), British writer of erotic fiction
- John Stevenson (scriptwriter) (1937–2023), British journalist and writer
- John R. Stevenson, scriptwriter
- John Stephenson (actor) (1923–2015), sometimes credited as John Stevenson
- John Stevenson (director) (born 1958), British-American film director (Kung Fu Panda)

== Military ==
- John Dunlap Stevenson (1821–1897), Union Civil War general
- John D. Stevenson (United States Air Force general) (1914–1995), U.S. Air Force general
- John H. Stevenson (1839–1899), member of the United States Navy during the American Civil War and the Spanish–American War
- John Rowlstone Stevenson (1908–1971), Australian Army officer and a parliamentary officer

== Politics ==
- John W. Stevenson (1812–1886), Governor of Kentucky and U.S. Senator
- John Stevenson (Wisconsin politician) (1835–1908), member of the Wisconsin State Assembly
- John Stevenson (Ontario politician) (1812–1884), member of Parliament of Ontario
- John Stevenson (Saskatchewan politician) (1873–1956), Saskatchewan politician and Senator
- John Stevenson (Manitoba politician) (1848–1879), member of Legislative Assembly of Manitoba
- John Stevenson (Queensland politician) (1843–1912), Australian politician
- John Stevenson (British politician) (born 1963), MP for Carlisle

== Sports ==
- John Stevenson (footballer, born 1862) (1862–?), Scottish footballer for Accrington
- John Stevenson (footballer, born 1898) (1898–1979), English/Scottish footballer (Ayr United, Nelson St Johnstone, Falkirk)
- John Stevenson (soccer) (1953–), Australian international soccer player for Heart of Midlothian, St Johnstone, Sydney City, South, Melbourne and Sunshine George Cross
- John Stevenson (Queen's Park footballer) (died 1910s), footballer who played for Queen's Park
- John Stevenson (cricketer) (1888–1951), English cricketer

== Other people ==
- John Stevenson (doctor) (c. 1718–1785), Scottish-born merchant and doctor in Baltimore, Maryland
- John Stevenson (surgeon) (1778–1846?), English surgeon
- John W. Stevenson (minister) (1835–1898), American African Methodist Episcopal church minister
- John Stevenson (mycologist) (1836–1903), Scottish minister and mycologist

== See also ==
- John Stephenson (disambiguation)
- J. J. Stevenson (1831–1908), British architect
- John Hall-Stevenson (1718–1785), English country gentleman and writer
- Jon Stevenson (born 1982), English footballer
