= Aspendale =

Aspendale may refer to:

- Aspendale, Victoria in Australia
  - Aspendale railway station
- Aspendale (Kenton) in Delaware, United States
