= Darcy Walsh =

Australian rules footballer, born 1918

Personal information
- Full name: Darcy Thomas Walsh
- Born: 21 August 1918; Hamilton, New Zealand
- Died: 27 November 1962 (aged 44); Edithvale, Victoria
- Original team: Brighton
- Height: 184 cm (6 ft 0 in)
- Weight: 79 kg (174 lb)

Playing career^{1}
Years	Club	Games (Goals)
1942–44	Melbourne	18 (0)
- ^{1} Playing statistics correct to the end of 1944.

Darcy Thomas Walsh (21 August 1918 – 27 November 1962) was an Australian rules footballer who played with Melbourne in the Victorian Football League (VFL).

Walsh later served in the Australian Army during World War II.
