= List of places on the Victorian Heritage Register in the City of Kingston =

This is a list of places on the Victorian Heritage Register in the City of Kingston in Victoria, Australia. The Victorian Heritage Register is maintained by the Heritage Council of Victoria.

The Victorian Heritage Register, as of 2020, lists the following eight state-registered places within the City of Kingston:

Place name	Place #	Location	Suburb or Town	Co-ordinates	Built	State registered	Photo
Chelsea Court House	H0804	6 The Strand	Chelsea	38.052830°S 145.115040°E	1928	11 July 1990	
Christ Church	H0225	387-405 Old Dandenong Rd	Dingley Village	37.972540°S 145.118810°E	1873	9 October 1974	
Community of the Holy Name and Retreat House	H2008	32-40 Cavanagh St	Cheltenham	37.962030°S 145.067410°E	1892	13 February 2003	
Market Gardeners Tram Plateway	H0928	Centre Dandenong Rd	Heatherton	37.970340°S 145.096130°E	1908-09	19 August 1992	
Mentone Hotel	H2346	95 Beach Rd	Mentone	37.991560°S 145.065140°E	1889	11 June 2015	
Mentone railway station	H2099	Balcombe Rd	Mentone	37.981740°S 145.065150°E	1913-14	3 August 2006	
Nicholson Pipe Organ	H1861	St Patrick's Church, 10 Rogers St	Mentone	37.983110°S 145.068840°E	1861	23 December 1999	
Wurlitzer Theatre Organ	H1860	Moorabbin Town Hall, 977 Nepean Hwy	Moorabbin	37.933820°S 145.036030°E	1928	23 December 1999	
