= Edithvale railway station =

Railway station in Melbourne, Australia

Edithvale
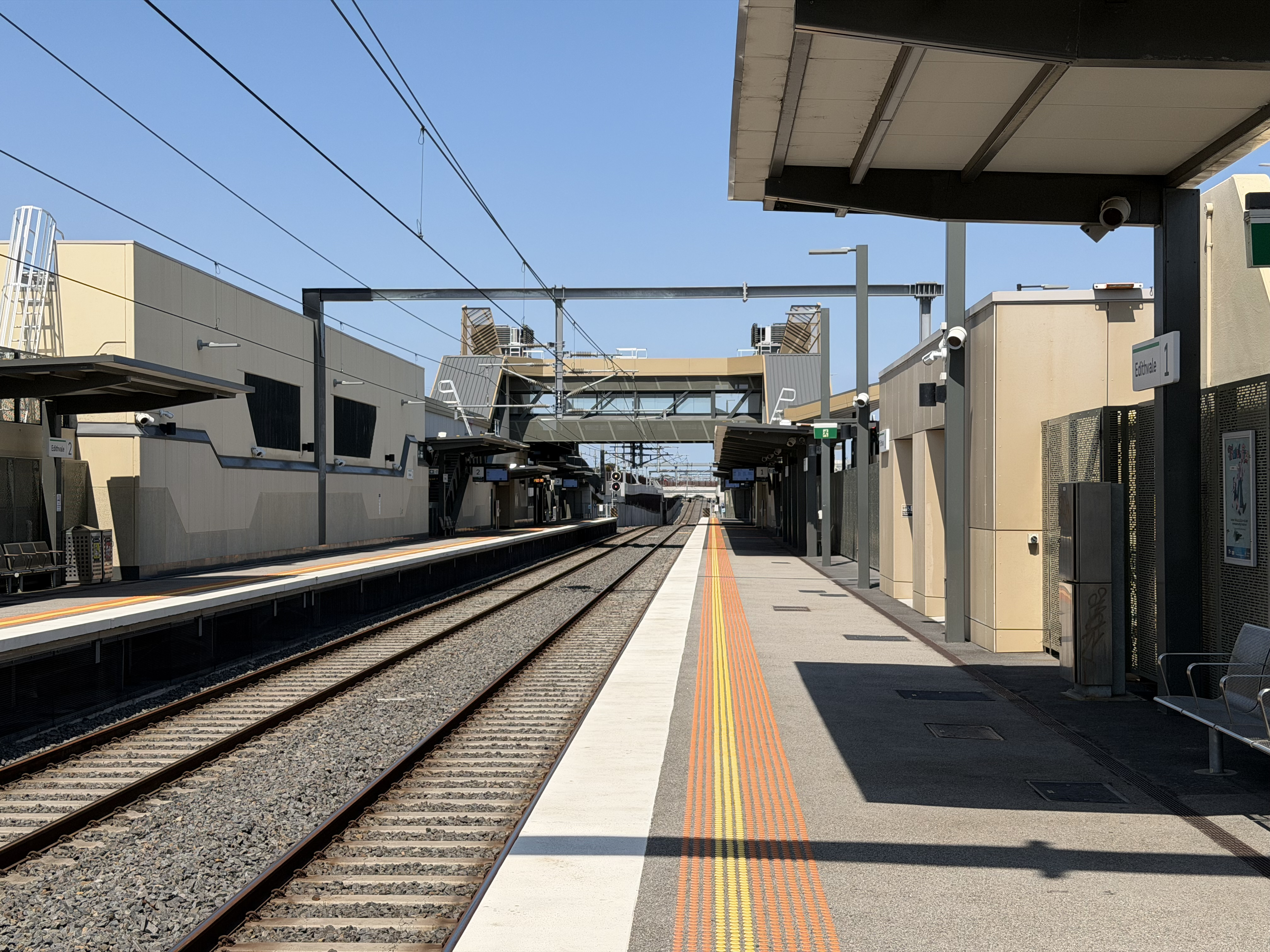
- Southbound view from Platform 1, February 2026

General information
- Location: Nepean Highway, Edithvale, Victoria 3196; City of Kingston; Australia
- Coordinates: 38°02′17″S 145°06′31″E
- System: PTV commuter rail station
- Owner: VicTrack
- Operator: Metro Trains
- Line: Frankston
- Distance: 31.67 kilometres from Southern Cross
- Platforms: 2 side
- Tracks: 2
- Connections: Bus

Construction
- Structure type: Below ground
- Parking: 50
- Cycle facilities: Yes
- Accessible: Yes—step free access

Other information
- Status: Operational, unstaffed
- Station code: EDI
- Fare zone: Myki zone 2
- Website: Public Transport Victoria

History
- Opened: 20 September 1919; 107 years ago
- Rebuilt: 1981; 22 November 2021 (LXRP)
- Electrified: August 1922 (1500 V DC overhead)

Passengers
- 2005–2006: 282,891
- 2006–2007: 302,980 ▲7.1%
- 2007–2008: 351,120 ▲15.88%
- 2008–2009: 398,524 ▲13.5%
- 2009–2010: 398,274 ▼0.06%
- 2010–2011: 422,494 ▲6.08%
- 2011–2012: 409,363 ▼3.1%
- 2012–2013: Not measured
- 2013–2014: 308,338 ▼24.67%
- 2014–2015: 292,894 ▼5%
- 2015–2016: 295,235 ▲0.79%
- 2016–2017: 288,462 ▼2.29%
- 2017–2018: 314,454 ▲9.01%
- 2018–2019: 303,950 ▼3.34%
- 2019–2020: 196,750 ▼35.26%
- 2020–2021: 104,700 ▼46.78%
- 2021–2022: 101,050 ▼3.48%
- 2022–2023: 168,750 ▲66.99%
- 2023–2024: 186,300 ▲10.4%
- 2024–2025: 201,450 ▲8.13%

Services
Preceding station	Metro Trains	Following station
Aspendale towards Flinders Street via City Loop	Frankston line	Chelsea towards Frankston
Track layout
Location

Edithvale station is a railway station operated by Metro Trains Melbourne on the Frankston line, part of the Melbourne rail network. It serves the south-eastern suburb of the same name, in Melbourne, Victoria, Australia, and opened on 20 September 1919. The current station was opened in November 2021.

== History ==
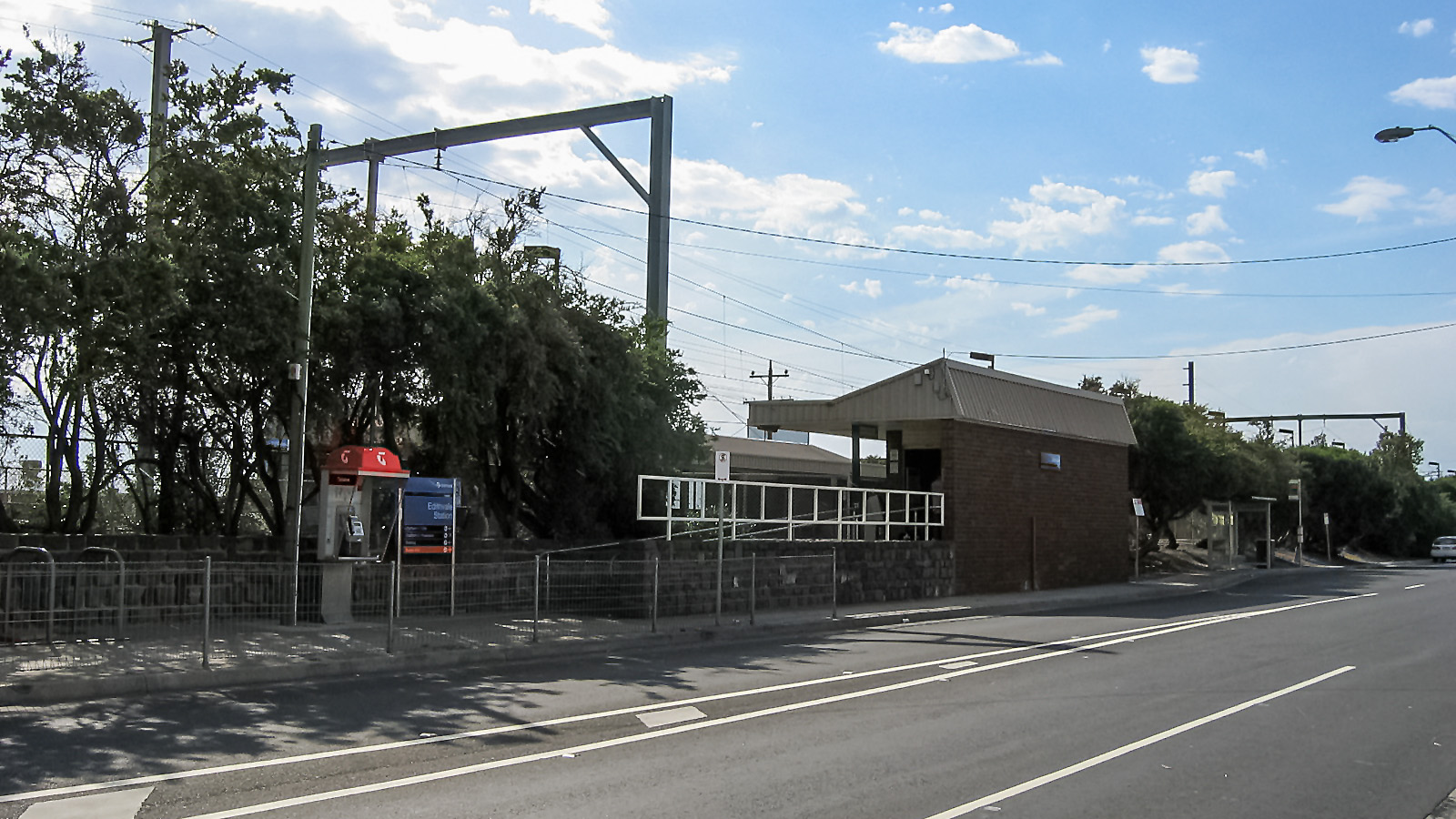
Former ground-level station building and entrance to Platform 2, November 2007

Edithvale station gets its name from Edithvale Road, itself named after a local farm, Edithvale Farm, which was established in the 1850s and owned by John and Edith Greves.

In its early years, a siding existed on the down side before Platform 2.

In 1978, boom barriers replaced interlocked gates at the former Edithvale Road level crossing, which was located at the down end of the station. In 1981, the former ground level station buildings were provided.

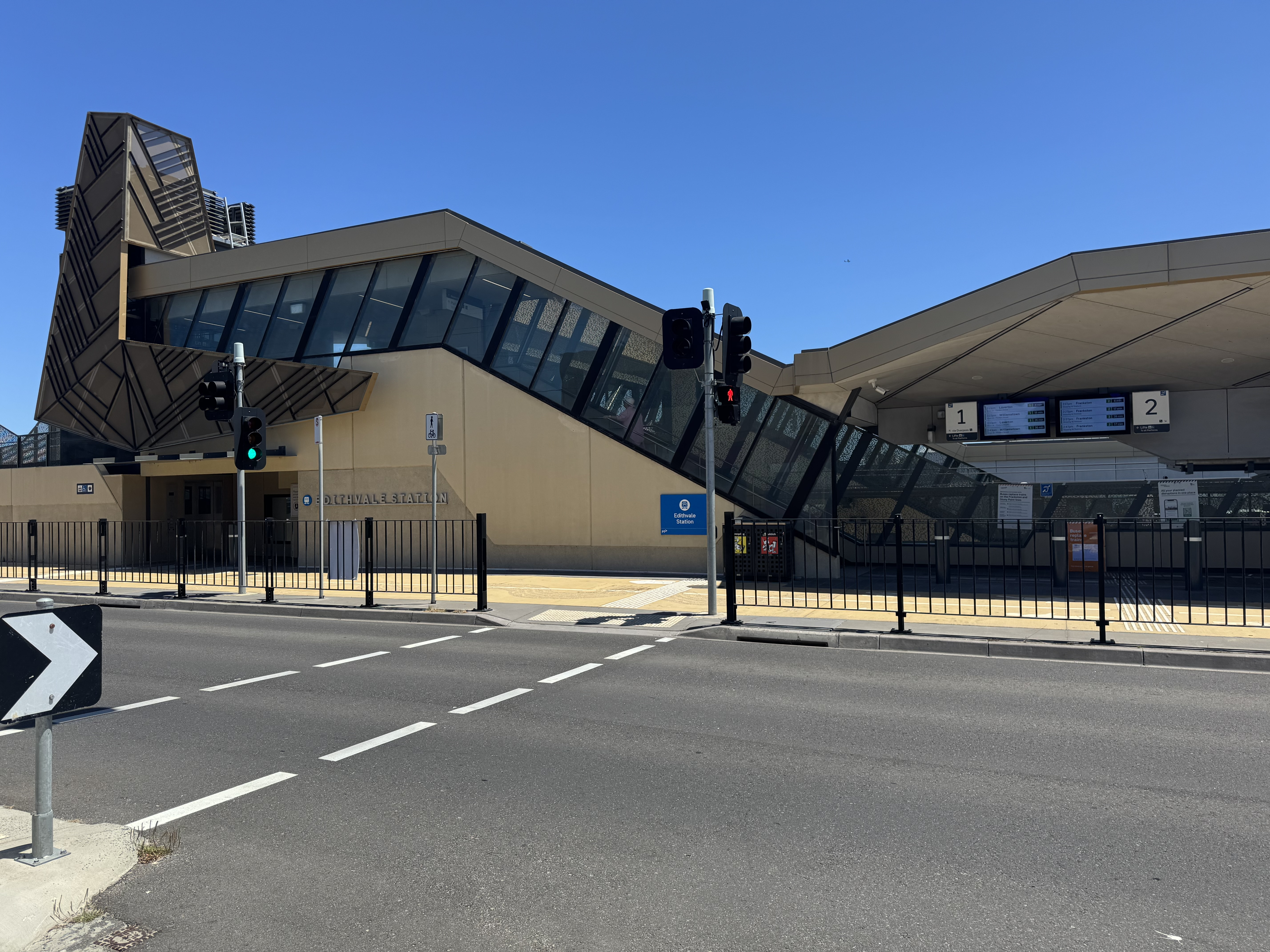
Station building and entrance from Station Street, December 2024

The Edithvale Road level crossing was grade separated under the Level Crossing Removal Project. Construction started in 2020, with the former ground-level station closing on 25 July 2021 for demolition. As part of the project, the line was lowered into a trench, and the station rebuilt, along with Chelsea and Bonbeach stations. On 22 November of that year, the new below-ground station opened to passengers.

== Platforms and services ==
Edithvale has two side platforms and is served by Frankston line trains.

Edithvale platform arrangement
Platform	Line	Destination	Via	Service Type	Source
1	Frankston line	Flinders Street	City Loop	All stations and limited express services	
2	Frankston line	Frankston or Carrum		All stations	

== Transport links ==
Kinetic Melbourne operates one SmartBus route via Edithvale station, under contract to Public Transport Victoria:

- SmartBus 902 : Chelsea station – Westfield Airport West

Ventura Bus Lines operates two routes via Edithvale station, under contract to Public Transport Victoria:

- 706 : Mordialloc – Chelsea station (off-peak only)
- 858 : Edithvale – Aspendale Gardens
