= Aspendale, Victoria =

Aspendale
- Suburb
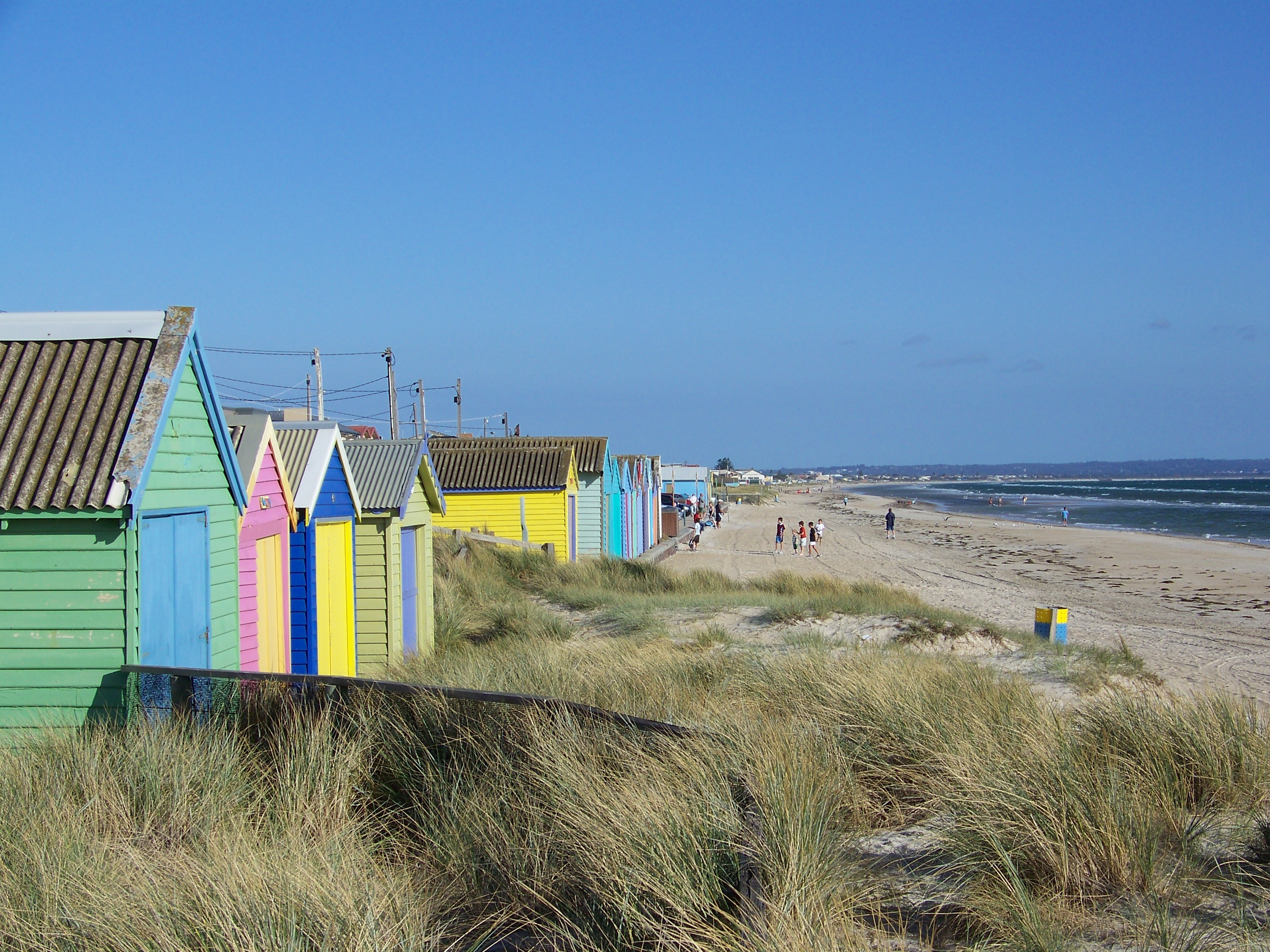
- Aspendale Beach

- Interactive map of Aspendale
- Coordinates: 38.025°S 145.104°E
- Country: Australia
- State: Victoria
- City: Melbourne
- LGA: City of Kingston
- Location: 27 km (17 mi) from Melbourne

Government
  - State electorate: Mordialloc
  - Federal division: Isaacs

Area
  - Total: 2.9 km^{2} (1.1 sq mi)
- Elevation: 5 m (16 ft)

Population
  - Total: 7,285 (2021 census)
  - Density: 2,510/km^{2} (6,510/sq mi)
- Postcode: 3195
- Mean max temp: 19.1 °C (66.4 °F)
- Mean min temp: 9.9 °C (49.8 °F)
- Annual rainfall: 703.5 mm (27.70 in)
Suburbs around Aspendale
Port Phillip	Mordialloc	Braeside
Port Phillip	Aspendale	Aspendale Gardens
Port Phillip	Edithvale	Chelsea; Heights

Aspendale is a suburb in Melbourne, Victoria, Australia, 27 km south-east of Melbourne's Central Business District, located within the City of Kingston local government area. Aspendale recorded a population of 7,285 at the 2021 census.

== Description ==
Aspendale is bordered by Port Phillip to the west, Mordialloc and Braeside to the north, Edithvale to the south, and Aspendale Gardens to the east.

Aspendale is bisected by the Nepean Highway and the Frankston line. These provide the main connections to inner Melbourne. On the beach side of the highway, there is more medium density development, and land prices are very high. This area is generally known as Aspendale Beach. Some larger blocks with older houses remain in this area, although many of these larger blocks have been subdivided into flats and units in the past two decades. On the other side of the Nepean Highway, housing is typically low-density, and land values are not as high. The Eastern boundary of Aspendale is the Mordialloc main drain. This area is very picturesque, with eucalypts and a long gravel track that extends from Mordialloc Creek, past the back of St Louis De Montfort's School to the Edithvale wetlands. The historic Doyles Bridge Hotel is situated at Number 1, Nepean Highway, Aspendale.

== Facilities ==
Recreational facilities in Aspendale include the Rossdale Golf Course and Aspendale Life Saving Club. Other sports clubs include the Aspendale Cricket Club and the St Brigid-St Louis Cricket Club. In conjunction with neighbouring suburb Edithvale, Aspendale has an Australian Rules football team (Edithvale-Aspendale) competing in the Mornington Peninsula Nepean Football League (the original team of Gerard Healy and Dylan Shiel).

Aspendale is home to two primary schools - St Louis de Montfort Catholic Primary School and Aspendale Primary School; two kindergartens - Aspendale North Kindergarten and Nola Barber Kindergarten; and one secondary school - Mordialloc Secondary College. There was previously also Aspendale Technical School, but this was closed in the 1990s and the land was sold by the State Government to be subdivided as housing.

Aspendale has two churches - St Louis de Montfort Catholic Church and Aspendale Presbyterian Church.

Aspendale has its own train station, which forms part of the Frankston line. There are two small commercial areas in Aspendale, located in Station Street and Laura Street. These take the form of single-sided strip shopping centres.

The Commonwealth Scientific and Industrial Research Organisation facility at Aspendale houses about 150 staff from CSIRO Marine and Atmospheric Research, together with scientific facilities such as a wind tunnel for calibrating anemometers, and laboratories for studying air pollution and climate change.

== History ==
Aspendale was occupied by Indigenous Australians for many thousands of years before European settlement. Europeans began farming the area in the 19th century and displaced local inhabitants. When European appropriation began, the land was occupied by the Bunurong people. The geography of the area at the start of European settlement consisted of large sand dune complexes on the coast, and wetland areas inland. The area is flat and low-lying, reaching above sea level by only a few metres.

The geography and ecology of the area has undergone radical changes as a result of European settlement. Much of the wetland area was drained during the second half of the 19th century, with the largest remnants now protected in the Edithvale-Seaford Wetlands Ramsar site, part of which lies in Aspendale. Likewise, only modest remnants of the sand dunes exist today near the beach. The beach is a depositary, sandy beach, and the waters remain shallow a long way out. Although no wetland areas remain in Aspendale itself, significant wetland areas have been preserved in the adjacent suburbs of Edithvale and Aspendale Gardens and these areas provide a good indication of what Aspendale once would have looked like. Migratory bird species from all over the world visit these areas.

Aspendale was home to Aspendale Park Racecourse, a horse racing and motor racing track. The suburb's name comes from Aspen, a successful racehorse. Aspendale train station was built primarily to cater towards the racing crowd in the late part of the 19th century. The racecourse closed in the late 1940s, and nothing remains of it.

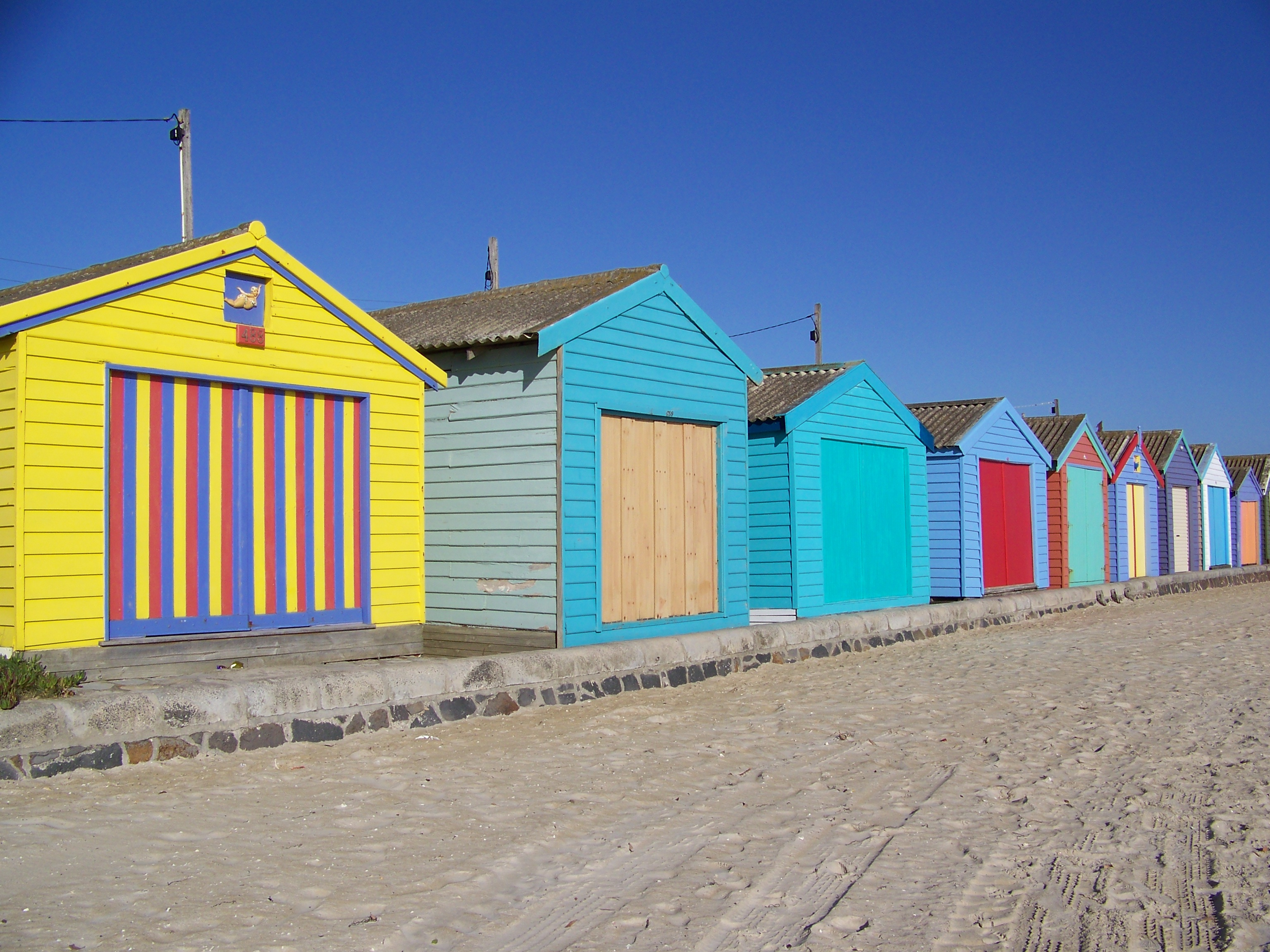
Beach huts on the beach at Aspendale

Although there are a few older houses nearer the beach, it was in the 1950s, 60s and 70s that Aspendale was extensively subdivided for residential purposes. Today, it is almost entirely residential in character. Houses are typically detached and made of brick. Blocks of land from this era are usually less than a quarter of an acre in size.

Many of the street names acknowledge the area's coastal and nautical heritage; e.g. 'Foam', 'Longbeach', 'Dolphin', 'Captain', 'Gale' and 'Anchor'. Other street names are Aboriginal, e.g. 'Yallambee,' 'Iluka,' 'Tarlee,' 'Nirringa' and 'Cooinda.' Other streets were named after racehorses, e.g. 'Marabou,' 'Lincoln' and 'Gothic.'

Aspendale Life Saving Club has a long proud history beginning in 1926 and is currently being rebuilt courtesy of state funding.

Aspendale Post Office opened on 16 December 1908. Aspendale railway station opened in April 1891 as Aspendale Park Race-Course, and was renamed Aspendale in 1905.

During the late 1950s the Catholic population of Aspendale sought to celebrate Mass locally, initially at Martin’s Dance Hall opposite Aspendale Station. When the hall was sold, Mass was celebrated in the old Scout Hall at Regents Park. In 1961 the current Catholic school and church site was purchased, with the school opening in 1965.

== Climate ==
Aspendale possesses an oceanic climate (Köppen: Cfb). The town experiences warm summers and cool winters. Average maxima vary from 25.5 °C (77.9 °F) in February to 13.2 °C (55.8 °F) in July, while average minima fluctuate between 14.4 °C (57.9 °F) in February and 5.9 °C (42.6 °F) in July. Precipitation is moderate, averaging 703.5 mm (27.70 in) per annum. However, rainfall is quite frequent (particularly in winter), as it is spread across 140.4 precipitation days. The town is not sunny, experiencing 120.0 cloudy days and only 34.5 clear days per annum. Extreme temperatures have ranged from 43.1 °C (109.6 °F) on 24 January 1982 to −3.9 °C (25.0 °F) on 16 June 1969.

Climate data for Aspendale CSIRO (38.03°S 145.10°E, 5 m (16 ft) AMSL) (1954-1982)
Month	Jan	Feb	Mar	Apr	May	Jun	Jul	Aug	Sep	Oct	Nov	Dec	Year
Record high °C (°F)	43.1 (109.6)	40.3 (104.5)	38.2 (100.8)	31.9 (89.4)	26.6 (79.9)	20.2 (68.4)	22.5 (72.5)	23.5 (74.3)	28.4 (83.1)	35.0 (95.0)	37.2 (99.0)	40.9 (105.6)	43.1 (109.6)
Mean daily maximum °C (°F)	25.2 (77.4)	25.5 (77.9)	23.1 (73.6)	19.8 (67.6)	16.4 (61.5)	13.6 (56.5)	13.2 (55.8)	14.1 (57.4)	16.1 (61.0)	18.6 (65.5)	20.3 (68.5)	22.9 (73.2)	19.1 (66.3)
Mean daily minimum °C (°F)	13.8 (56.8)	14.4 (57.9)	12.7 (54.9)	10.6 (51.1)	8.4 (47.1)	6.2 (43.2)	5.9 (42.6)	6.6 (43.9)	7.8 (46.0)	9.2 (48.6)	10.6 (51.1)	12.3 (54.1)	9.9 (49.8)
Record low °C (°F)	5.1 (41.2)	4.6 (40.3)	3.9 (39.0)	1.7 (35.1)	−0.7 (30.7)	−3.9 (25.0)	−2.7 (27.1)	−1.3 (29.7)	−0.4 (31.3)	0.7 (33.3)	2.1 (35.8)	4.4 (39.9)	−3.9 (25.0)
Average precipitation mm (inches)	41.4 (1.63)	46.8 (1.84)	47.0 (1.85)	58.5 (2.30)	76.2 (3.00)	50.8 (2.00)	58.2 (2.29)	70.4 (2.77)	69.0 (2.72)	69.5 (2.74)	60.7 (2.39)	56.1 (2.21)	703.5 (27.70)
Average precipitation days (≥ 0.2 mm)	6.8	6.2	8.8	10.3	14.3	13.5	15.4	16.1	14.7	13.0	11.7	9.6	140.4
Average afternoon relative humidity (%)	53	55	57	59	67	71	68	65	63	61	59	58	61
Average dew point °C (°F)	12.3 (54.1)	13.7 (56.7)	12.0 (53.6)	10.0 (50.0)	8.8 (47.8)	7.2 (45.0)	6.0 (42.8)	6.1 (43.0)	7.1 (44.8)	8.7 (47.7)	9.8 (49.6)	11.2 (52.2)	9.4 (48.9)
Mean monthly sunshine hours	269.7	237.3	217.0	162.0	133.3	117.0	133.3	151.9	171.0	198.4	222.0	254.2	2,267.1
Percentage possible sunshine	60	62	57	49	43	41	44	46	48	49	52	56	51
Source: Bureau of Meteorology (1954-1985)

== Artistic and Naturalist Heritage ==
The ornithologist Archibald James Campbell took a number of nature photographs in Aspendale between 1896 and 1903. In the 1960s, the art dealer and restaurateur Georges Mora had a beachside house in Aspendale which was regularly visited by artists such as Albert Tucker and Sidney Nolan. Art patrons John and Sunday Reed also had a beachhouse in the dunes of Aspendale beach. Their modernist home was designed in 1961 by architect David McGlashan. This role of Aspendale as an artists' haven was recognised in an exhibition at the Mornington Peninsula Regional Gallery in early 2008.

Prior to forming part of the City of Kingston, Aspendale was part of the City of Chelsea and, before that, the Shire of Carrum.

== See also ==
- City of Chelsea – Aspendale was previously within this former local government area.
