= City of Kingston =

Coordinates: 37°59′S 145°06′E

- Local government area
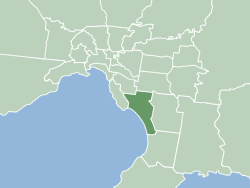

- Interactive map of City of Kingston
- Country: Australia
- State: Victoria
- Region: Greater Melbourne
- Location: 15 km (9.3 mi) from Melbourne city centre
- Established: 1994
- Council seat: Cheltenham

Government
  - Mayor: Tony Athanasopoulos
  - State electorate: Bentleigh; Carrum; Clarinda; Mordialloc; Sandringham
  - Federal divisions: Hotham; Isaacs; Goldstein; Dunkley

Area
  - Total: 91 km^{2} (35 sq mi)

Population
  - Total: 169,000 (2026 (estimate)) (45th (Australia, estimated))
  - Density: 1,857/km^{2} (4,810/sq mi)
- Website: City of Kingston
LGAs around City of Kingston
| Bayside | Glen Eira | Monash |
| Port Phillip | City of Kingston | Greater Dandenong |
| Port Phillip | Frankston | Frankston |

The City of Kingston is a local government area in Victoria, Australia, in the south-eastern suburbs of Melbourne, its northern boundary lying approximately 15 km (9.3 mi) from the Melbourne city centre along the north-eastern shorelines of Port Phillip. It covers an area of 91 km^{2} (35 sq mi) and has an estimated population of 167,228 people.

With 13 km of coastline abutting Port Phillip, the city has been described as becoming a 'lifestyle capital' of Melbourne, where the municipality features Moorabbin Airport, DFO Moorabbin and Westfield Southland, with two AFL facilities for the respective teams of Hawthorn Football Club and St Kilda Football Club.

Home to a number of golf courses including hosts of international tournaments, such as the World Cup of Golf, Australian Open, Australian Masters and in 2028 the Presidents Cup; the city is dotted by parkland and reserves aside from the expansive 2,070 hectare Green Wedge. Braeside Park, Karkarook Park and Patterson River are all managed through Parks Victoria, with the latter providing access to Port Phillip being the busiest boat launching facility in Victoria.

== History ==
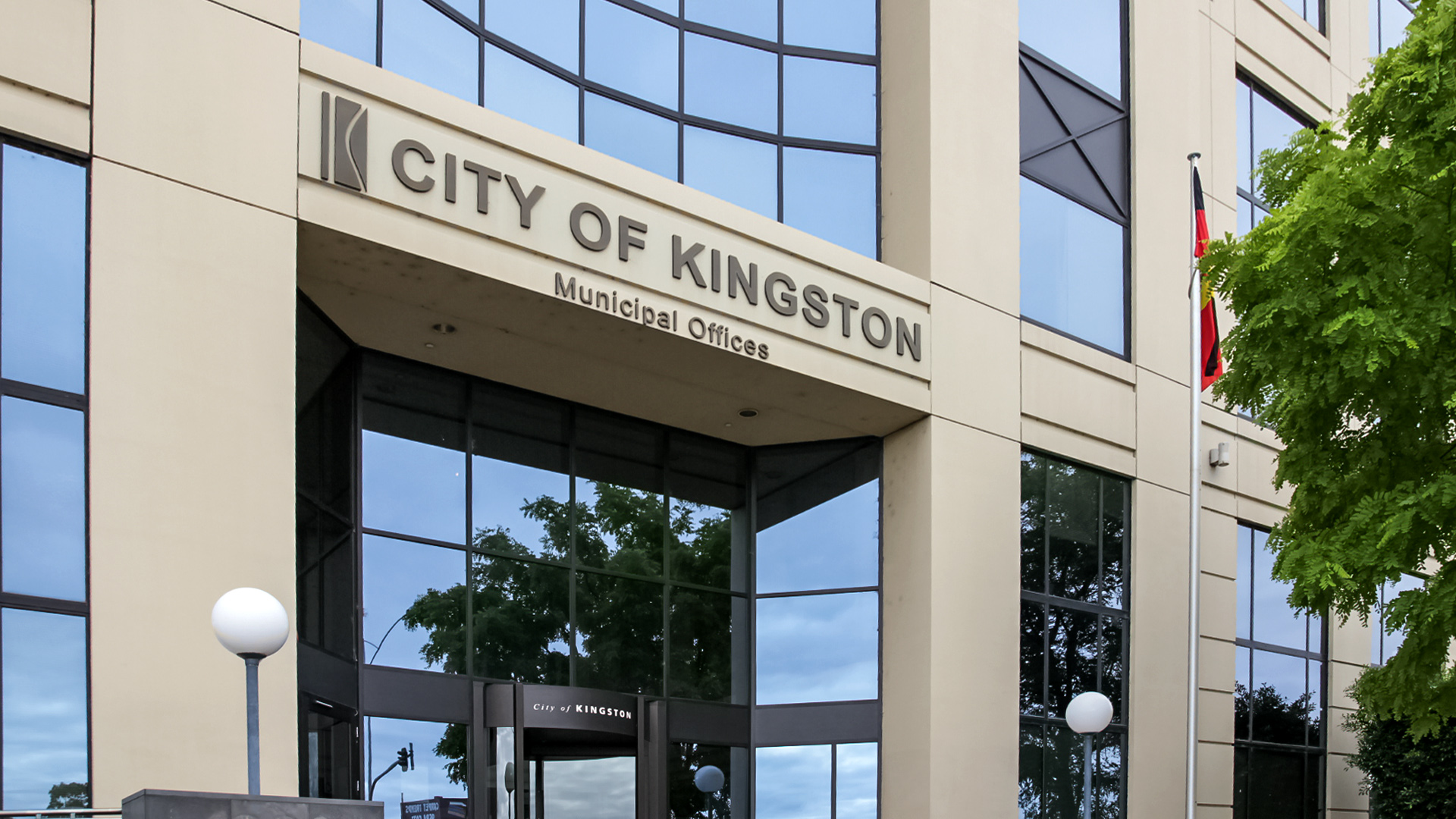
The City of Kingston headquarters at 1230 Nepean Highway in Cheltenham.

The City of Kingston area was originally governed by the Moorabbin Roads Board, which formed in 1862 and became a shire council in 1871, covering a large area of mixed agricultural and semi-urban land. After years of agitation in 1917 the seaside town of Sandringham became a borough with its own council, and this fuelled the desire of those living in towns further south to combine their efforts and demand self-representation. This finally occurred in May 1920 and the 'Borough of Mordialloc and Mentone' was formed. It became a town in 1923 and the City of Mordialloc in 1926.

The City of Moorabbin had a population of 109,588 by the time of the 1971 census.

In 1994, the state government amalgamated local councils all over Victoria, as part of its local government reform. The new City of Kingston was one result, and on 15 December 1994 the city was formally gazetted comprising all of the City of Chelsea, most of the City of Mordialloc, a substantial portion of the City of Moorabbin, and parts of the cities of Oakleigh and Springvale. The City of Kingston headquarters opened at 34 Brindisi Street, Mentone that remains a property portfolio asset.

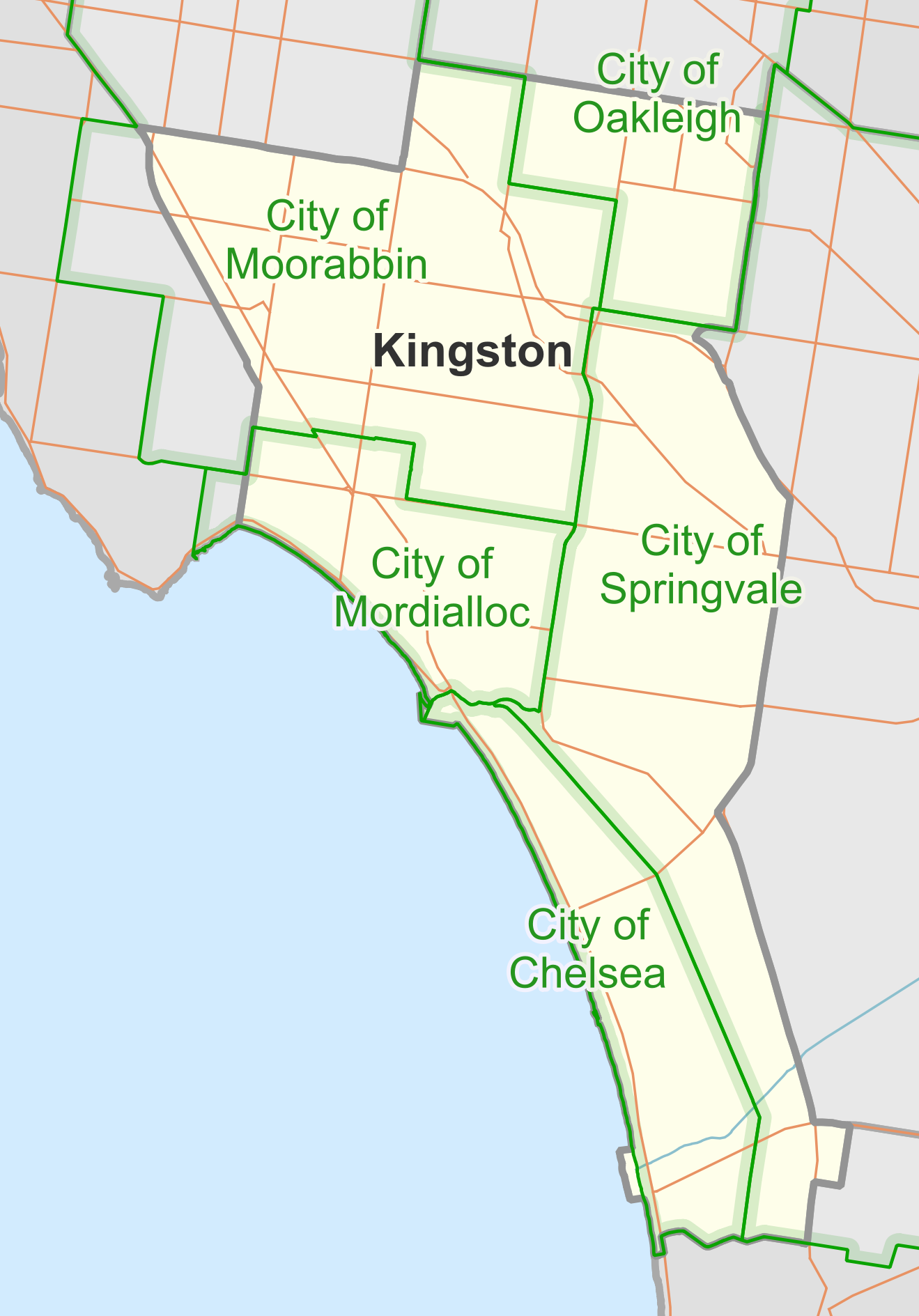
The City of Kingston's predecessor LGAs (green) as they were in 1994

An electoral structure for Kingston was introduced in November 2008 to include three wards – North Ward, Central Ward and South Ward, with three Councillors representing each ward. This made a total of nine Councillors instead of the previous structure of seven wards each represented by one Councillor. Further electoral structure changes led to in November 2020 there being a total of 11 wards each individually represented by a Councillor.

Kingston's headquarters since 2005 have been in Cheltenham at the former 7-storey office of Fujitsu Australia built in 1993.

== Education ==
Primary education

- Aspendale Gardens Primary School
- Aspendale Primary School
- Bonbeach Primary School
- Carrum Primary School
- Chelsea Primary School
- Chelsea Heights Primary School
- Cheltenham East Primary School
- Clarinda Primary School
- Clayton South Primary School
- Dingley Primary School
- Edithvale Primary School
- Kingston Heath Primary School
- Kingswood Primary School
- Le Page Primary School
- Mentone Primary School
- Mentone Park Primary School
- Mordialloc Beach Primary School
- Our Lady of the Assumption Catholic Primary School
- Parktone Primary School
- Parkdale Primary School
- Patterson Lakes Primary School
- Southmoor Primary School
- St Andrew's Catholic Primary School
- St Brigid's Catholic Primary School
- St Catherines Catholic Primary School
- St John Vianney's Catholic Primary School
- St Joseph's Catholic Primary School
- St Louis De Montforts Catholic Primary School
- St Mark's Primary School
- St Patrick's Catholic Primary School
- Westall Primary School

Secondary education

- Cheltenham Secondary College
- Kilbreda College
- Mentone Girls' Secondary College
- Mordialloc Secondary College
- Parkdale Secondary College
- St Bede's Catholic College
- Westall Secondary College

Primary and secondary education

- Mentone Girls' Grammar School
- Mentone Grammar School

Technical and further education

- Holmesglen Institute of TAFE

== Townships and localities ==
The city had a population of 158,129 at the 2021 census, up from 151,389 in the 2016 census.

Population by locality
| Locality | 2016 | 2021 |
|---|---|---|
| Aspendale | 6,940 | 7,285 |
| Aspendale Gardens | 6,530 | 6,427 |
| Bonbeach | 6,416 | 6,855 |
| Braeside | 21 | 25 |
| Carrum | 3,980 | 4,239 |
| Chelsea | 7,773 | 8,347 |
| Chelsea Heights | 5,335 | 5,393 |
| Cheltenham^ | 22,291 | 23,992 |
| Clarinda | 7,481 | 7,441 |
| Clayton South | 12,642 | 13,381 |
| Dingley Village | 10,320 | 10,495 |
| Edithvale | 5,806 | 6,276 |
| Heatherton | 2,907 | 2,826 |
| Highett^ | 10,454 | 12,016 |
| Mentone | 12,965 | 13,197 |
| Moorabbin | 5,895 | 6,287 |
| Moorabbin Airport | 0 | 26 |
| Mordialloc | 8,166 | 8,886 |
| Oakleigh South^ | 9,261 | 9,851 |
| Parkdale | 11,746 | 12,308 |
| Patterson Lakes | 7,564 | 7,793 |
| Waterways | 2,461 | 2,422 |

^ – Territory divided with another LGA

== Railway stations ==
- Aspendale
  - Aspendale railway station – April 1891
- Bonbeach
  - Bonbeach railway station – February 1927
- Carrum
  - Carrum railway station – August 1882
- Chelsea
  - Chelsea railway station – February 1907
- Cheltenham
  - Cheltenham railway station – December 1881
  - Southland railway station – November 2017
- Clayton South
  - Westall railway station – February 1951
- Edithvale
  - Edithvale railway station – September 1919
- Highett
  - Highett railway station – December 1881
- Mentone
  - Mentone railway station – December 1881
- Moorabbin
  - Moorabbin railway station – December 1881
- Mordialloc
  - Mordialloc railway station – December 1881
- Parkdale
  - Parkdale railway station – September 1919

== Library services ==
The City of Kingston operates nine free council run libraries.

=== Major branches ===
- Chelsea
- Cheltenham
- Clarinda
- Parkdale
- Westall

=== Minor branches ===
- Dingley
- Highett
- Moorabbin
- Patterson Lakes

== Sport and recreation ==
=== Leisure and AFL facilities ===
There will be a total of three swimming and recreation centres by 2027, with two publicly operated by the city at Mordialloc and Highett:

- The Waves Leisure Centre at Highett has a 50m swimming pool, spa, gym and separate wave pool.
- Mordi Aquatics Centre located in Mordialloc features a 50m lap pool, a learn to swim pool, a leisure pool and a warm water pool, along with a spa, sauna, steam room, gym and a café.
- The indoor-outdoor SurfnPlay Aqua Park by Pellicano featuring a surf park, will be the largest of its kind in the southern atmosphere when it opens in 2027 at Dingley Village.

The Kennedy Community Centre, the current training and administrative base of the Hawthorn Football Club is located in Dingley Village, while St Kilda Football Club has their facilities located at RSEA Park in Moorabbin. Multiple local division AFL facilities are regarded as state of the art, which have been built in Carrum, Edithvale, Mordialloc and Mentone.

=== Athletes ===
The city has produced a number of AFL players including Luke Beveridge, Rex Hunt, Tim Taranto, Bailey Dale, Joel Amartey, Trevor Barker, Mitchell Brown, Ollie Florent, Mitch Owens and Dylan Shiel amongst other athletes, such as international champion swimmers Nicole Livingstone and Toby Haenen. It is also noteworthy that international cricketer, Scott Boland was born in Mordialloc and cricket legend Shane Warne attended Mentone Grammar School along with Dav Whatmore.

Featherweight boxing champion, Johnny Famechon's childhood home was in Aspendale and a street in Edithvale was renamed in his honour.

=== Golf facilities ===
The city has ten golf clubs where Kingston Heath Golf Club is the standout international grade course, hosting major tournaments.

=== Horse racing ===
The pedigree of horse training has a close relationship with Mordialloc and Carrum at Keast Park, where horses today continue to be trained on the bay shorelines.

From the training grounds of Mordialloc, Aspendale, Carrum and nearby Braeside came a number of notable Australian racehorses, including Melbourne Cup winners Phar Lap (stabled at Braeside and trained on Mordialloc beach), Rivette, Eurythmic and Hall Mark; Caulfield Cup winner Maple; Golden Slipper winner Vain; Hall of Fame champion Heroic; dual Newmarket Handicap winner Aspen; Sydney, Brisbane and Adelaide Cups winner Reckless; Australian Cup winner Saladin; Thousand Guineas winner Perfect Bliss; and Victoria Derby placegetter Stars of Carrum.

== Natural environment and parkland ==
The city has a dozens of sports grounds, aside from the 13 km of Port Phillip coastline, 2,070 hectares of Green Wedge parkland and high prevalence of golf courses (hosting national and international competitions), which complements the state parks managed by Parks Victoria including Braeside Park, Karkarook Park and Patterson River; with the latter popular with fishing charter operators as the home of the state's busiest boat launching facility.

Mordialloc has long served as one of Kingston's principal maritime centres, with Mordialloc Creek functioning from the nineteenth century as a vital waterway for commercial fishing, boatbuilding and local transport, helping establish the district's enduring connection to Port Phillip Bay. The subsequent development of Patterson Lakes from the 1970s transformed reclaimed farmland into Victoria's first large-scale canal estate, while the establishment and expansion of Patterson Lakes Marina, evolving from the original Whalers Cove Marina into the state's largest marina facility, reinforced the suburb's role as a major maritime gateway and recreational boating hub.

== Culture and arts ==
=== Facilities and events ===
The City of Kingston has art and theatre facilities in Parkdale and Moorabbin respectively at the Shirley Burke Theatre and Kingston City Hall, with seating for up to 800 occupants. Each year the city hosts the Mordi Fest with live music, the Spring Fair and Carols by Kingston as its key events.

=== Musicians and artists ===
Internationally acclaimed musician Rick Springfield's childhood home was in Parkdale; musician and composer Eddie Perfect was raised in Mentone; and musician Paul Kelly performed in Kingston venues during his early career. Popular rock bands British India and Jet respectively were from Mentone and Dingley Village. Jet band members, Chris Cester, Nic Cester and Cameron Muncey plus musicians Jimi Hocking (The Screaming Jets and The Angels) and Paul Dempsey (Something for Kate) all attended St Bede's College in Mentone.

The Heidelberg School was an art movement of the late 19th century with ties to Australian impressionism, which featured scenes of Mentone by respective artists Tom Roberts, Charles Conder and Frederick McCubbin. An international-standard sculpture trail is proceeding at Patterson River, bordering the suburbs of Carrum, Patterson Lakes and Bonbeach.

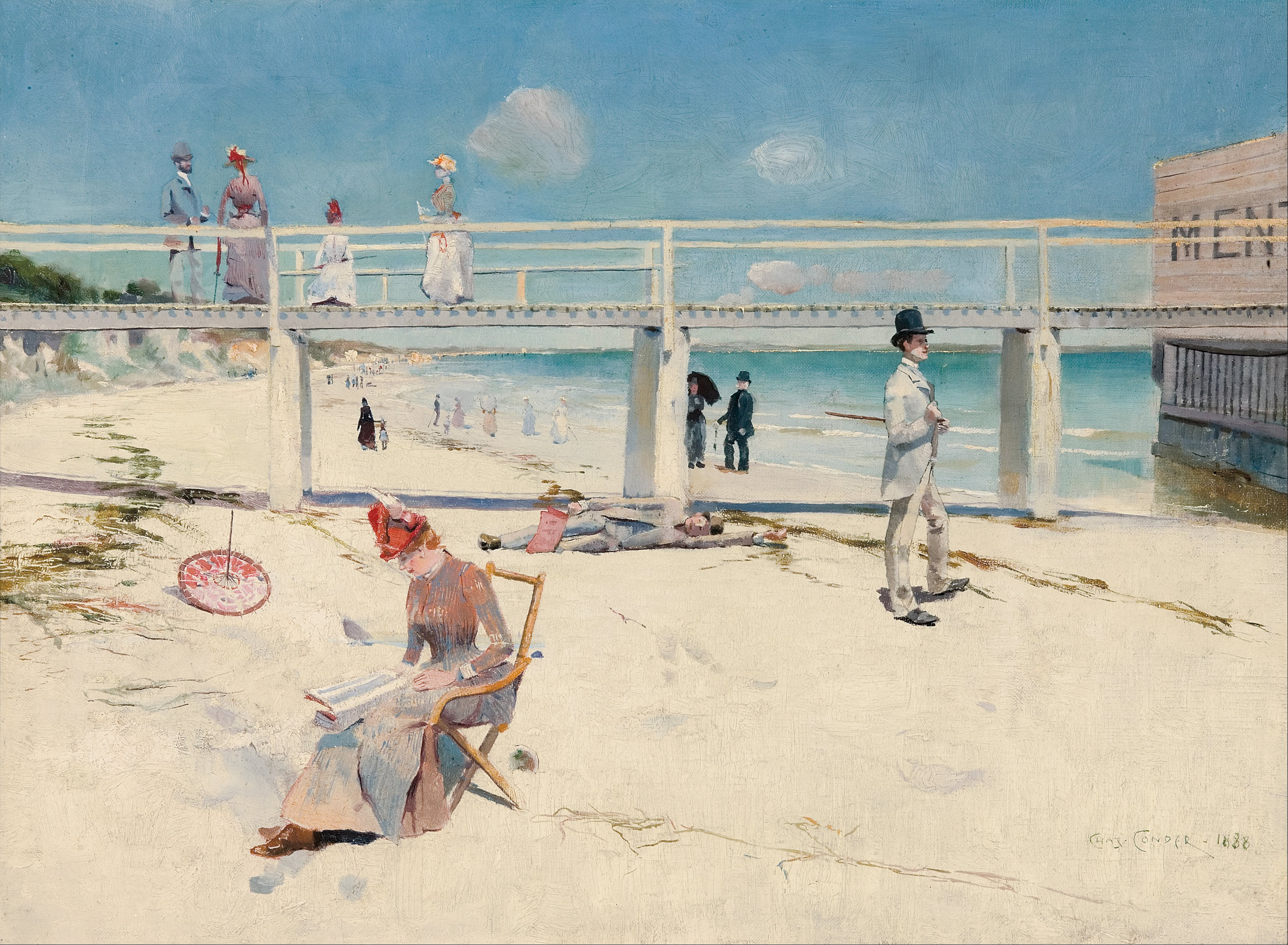
A holiday at Mentone, Charles Conder 1888

=== Food and dining ===
Mordialloc's Main Street in particular features a diverse restaurant scene and nightlife, with a range of culinary experiences that contribute to the character of the area.

== Media and entertainment ==
=== TV and films ===
The filming at Kath Day-Knight and Kel Knight's 'townhouse' (in the fictional suburb of Fountain Lakes) for the Australian comedy television series Kath & Kim was shot in Patterson Lakes at Lagoon Place. Kath & Kimderella was also filmed at the same location as the original Day-Knight house of the TV series.

The Australian TV series Underbelly Files was filmed in Cheltenham and Rush included an episode filmed in Moorabbin.

=== Media personalities ===
Numerous notable figures in Australian entertainment have connections to the municipality, including actor Guy Pearce, who attended school in Parkdale; comedian and broadcaster Glenn Robbins, who was raised in Cheltenham; actor and comedian Magda Szubanski, educated at Mentone Girls' Grammar School; and Australian television and radio personality, Rex Hunt who was born in Mentone.

== Economy ==
The City of Kingston's Gross Regional Product is estimated at $14.23 billion, which represents 2.44% of the state's GSP (Gross State Product), where manufacturing is the largest employer generating 16,882 local jobs. Kingston is home to more than 18,000 businesses and supports over 90,000 jobs. With the industrial sector being one of the largest and most concentrated in Victoria, the city is one of the state's major employment centres.

The Moorabbin Airport, DFO Moorabbin and Westfield Southland are significant economic landmarks for the City of Kingston. This is Kingston is the city's tourism and economic marketing arm.

== Council services and investment ==
The City of Kingston has an operational expenditure budget of $296.1 million, which supports the delivery of a broad range of municipal services across the municipality. Key areas of expenditure include road maintenance and construction; community, cultural and youth services; statutory town planning and development functions; waste management and recycling services; maintenance of parks and public open space; public health and animal management; library services; and initiatives supporting local business and tourism development.

In addition to its operational expenditure, the City of Kingston has adopted a capital works program of approximately $103.6 million for the 2025–26 financial year. The program includes investment in road reconstruction and resurfacing, drainage upgrades, footpaths and cycling infrastructure, park and open space improvements, community and sporting facilities, public buildings, playground renewals and environmental sustainability projects.

== Current councillors ==
Prior to 2020, the City of Kingston had three multi-member wards, however this changed to 11 single-member wards from the 2020 council election.

Kingston City Council 2024 election results

Type
- Type: Council of the City of Kingston

Structure
- Council political groups: Independent Labor: 3 seats Independent Freedom Party: 1 seat Independent: 7 seats

| Ward | Party | Councillor | Notes |
|---|---|---|---|
| Banksia | Independent | Chris Howe | |
| Bunjil | Independent Labor | Tony Athanasopoulos | |
| Caruana | Independent | Caroline White | 2022 Senate candidate for Liberal Democrats (Suspended for two months in August 2026 for breaching council code of conduct). |
| Chicquita | Independent | Jane Agirtan | Formerly Liberal Party. (Stood down from April 2025 to July 2025 while appearing in court.) |
| Como | Independent | Chris Hill | |
| Karkarook | Independent Labor | Hadi Saab | |
| Longbeach | Independent Labor | Georgina Oxley | |
| Melaleuca | Independent | Nikki Kaur | Elected at August 2026 by-election |
| Sandpiper | Independent | Kirralee Ashworth-Collett | |
| Wattle | Independent Freedom Party | Georgia Erevnidis | 2022 Freedom Party of Victoria candidate for Carrum |
| Yammerbrook | Independent | Sarah O’Donnell | 2022 Liberal Democrats candidate for Isaacs |

== Councillors and Mayors 1997–2024 ==
- Greg Alabaster 1997–2000 / 2005–2008
- Ron Brownlees OAM 1997–2000 / 2000–2003 / 2008–2012 / 2012–2016 / 2016–2020 (Mayor: 1998–99, 2010–11 & 2012–13)
- Di Comtesse 1997–2000
- Lesley McGurgan 1997–2000 (Mayor: 1999–2000)
- Bill Nixon OAM 1997–2000 / 2003–2005 / 2005–2008 (Mayor: 1997–98 & 2007–08)
- John Ronke 1997–2000 / 2000–2003 / 2005–2008 / 2008–2012 / 2012–2016 (Mayor: 2011–12)
- Dalene Salisbury 1997–2000
- Arthur Athanasopoulos 2000–2003 / 2003–2005 / 2005–2008 / 2008–2012 (Mayor: 2000–01, 2003–04, March – December 2004, 2008–09)
- Elizabeth Larking 2000–2003 / 2003–2005 (Mayor: 2001–02)
- David Normington 2000–2001
- Topsy Petchey OAM 2000–2003 / 2003–2005 / 2005–2008 (Mayor: 2002–03, 2004–05, 2005–06 & 2006–07)
- Joanna van Klaveren 2000–2005
- Trevor Shewan 2001–2003 / 2008–2012
- Andrew Adams 2003–2005
- Rosemary West OAM 2003–2005 / 2005–2008 / 2008–2012 / 2012–2016 / 2016–2020
- Justin McKeegan 2005–2008
- Donna Bauer 2008–2010
- Lew Dundas 2008–2012
- Paul Peulich 2008–2012 / 2012–2016 (Mayor: 2013–14)
- Steve Staikos 2008–2012 / 2012–2016 / 2016–2020 / 2020–2024 (Mayor 2009–10, 2017–18, 2020–21 & 2021–22)
- Dan Maloney 2011–2012
- Tamara Barth 2012–2016 / 2016–2020
- Geoff Gledhill 2012–2016 / 2016–2020 (Mayor: 2014–15)
- Tamsin Bearsley 2012–2016 / 2016–2020 / 2020–2024 (Mayor: 2015–16)
- David Eden 2012–2016 / 2016–2020 / 2020–2024 (Mayor: 2016–17)
- George Hua 2016–2020 / 2020–2024
- Georgina Oxley 2016–2020 / 2020–2024 (Mayor: 2018–19 & 2019–20) (2024–25 & 2025–26)
- Tim Cochrane 2020–2024
- Jenna Davey Burns 2020–2024 (Mayor: 2023–24)
- Tracey Davies 2020–2024
- Chris Hill 2020–2024
- Cameron Howe 2020–2024
- Hadi Saab 2020–2024 (Mayor: 2022–23)

== See also ==
- List of places on the Victorian Heritage Register in the City of Kingston
- List of Melbourne suburbs
