= Bonbeach =

Bonbeach Karrum Karrum (Boonwurrung)
- Suburb
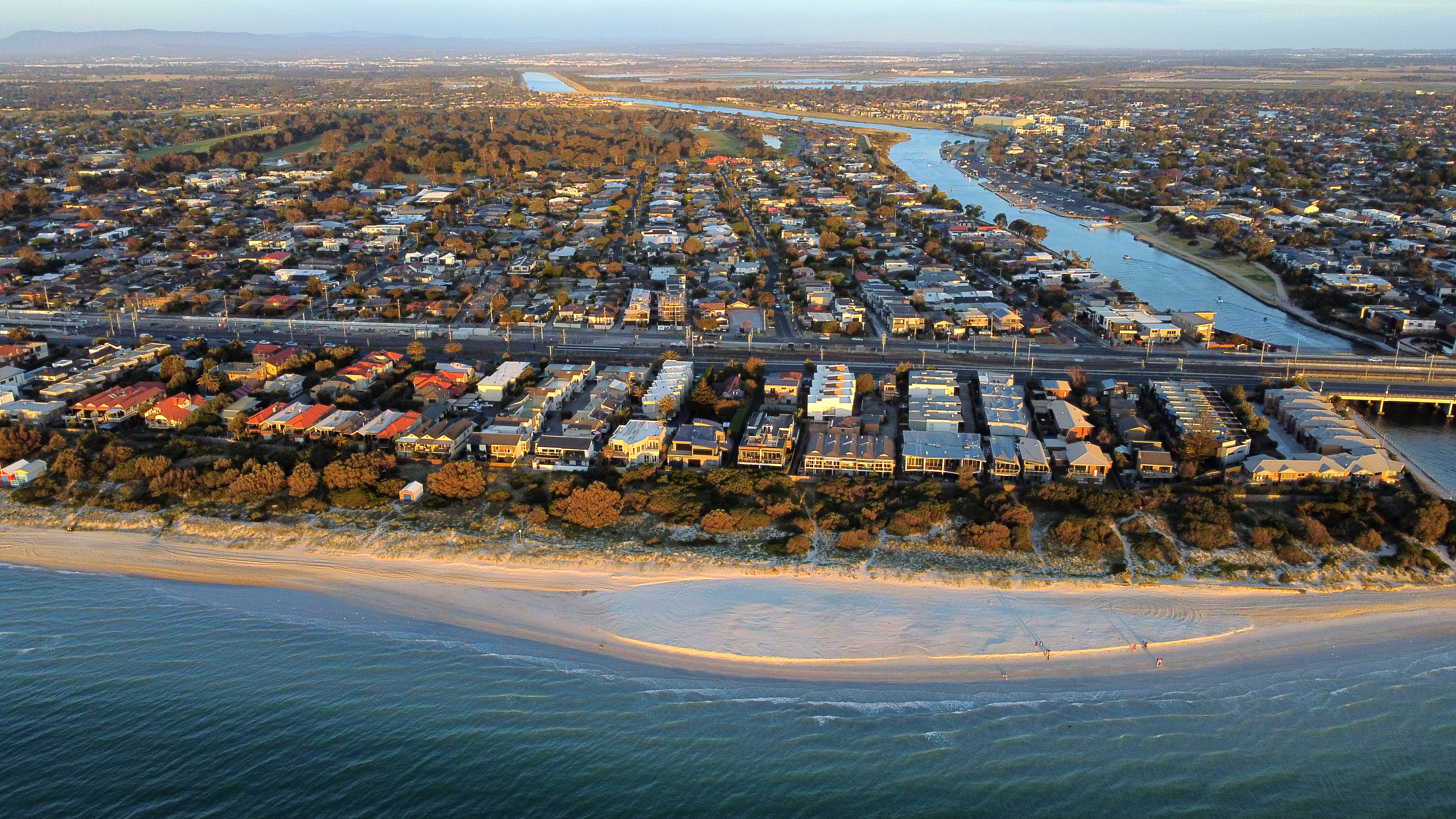
- View of Bonbeach from Port Phillip

- Interactive map of Bonbeach
- Coordinates: 38.062°S 145.12°E
- Country: Australia
- State: Victoria
- City: Melbourne
- LGA: City of Kingston
- Location: 31 km (19 mi) from Melbourne

Government
  - State electorate: Carrum
  - Federal division: Dunkley

Area
  - Total: 2.8 km^{2} (1.1 sq mi)

Population
  - Total: 6,855 (2021 census)
  - Density: 2,450/km^{2} (6,340/sq mi)
- Postcode: 3196
Suburbs around Bonbeach
Port Phillip	Chelsea	Chelsea Heights
Port Phillip	Bonbeach	Patterson Lakes
Port Phillip	Carrum	Patterson Lakes

Bonbeach is a suburb in Melbourne, Victoria, Australia, 31 km south-east of Melbourne's Central Business District, located within the City of Kingston local government area. Bonbeach recorded a population of 6,855 at the 2021 census.

== Facilities ==
The entire coastline of Bonbeach consists of a sandy beach facing Port Phillip. Bonbeach has a string of cafés and restaurants along the Nepean Highway.

Since 1926, Bonbeach has been serviced by Bonbeach railway station; a two-platform station on the Frankston line. This station was used during the filming of a scene in the Australian television series Kath & Kim. It was rebuilt in 2021 and grade-separated.

Bonbeach Post Office opened on 19 November 1922 (closing in 1923, then reopening in 1926 on the opening of the railway station) and finally closed in 1985.

Bonbeach has a school called Bonbeach Primary School.

The town has an Australian Rules football team competing in the Mornington Peninsula Nepean Football League and a cricket team competing in the Cricket Southern Bayside competition. Golfers play at the course of the Patterson River Country Club alongside the river. The Bonbeach Lifesaving Club has been running for 75 years.

The first artwork was installed in 2025 for the international standard Patterson River sculpture trail, around the 6km circuit trail.

== Politics ==
Chris Howe has been the local City of Kingston councillor since 2024, representing Banksia Ward, which includes the suburb of Bonbeach.

Bonbeach is in the Electoral district of Carrum in Victoria's Legislative Assembly, represented since 2014 by Labor MP Sonya Kilkenny.

As part of a regular electoral redistribution of boundaries, Bonbeach was moved to the federal Division of Dunkley from the 2025 Australian federal election and is currently represented in federal parliament by Labor MP Jodie Belyea.

== See also ==
- City of Chelsea – Bonbeach was previously within this former local government area.
