= John Stephenson (footballer, born 1937) =

Australian rules footballer

Personal information
- Full name: John Francis Stephenson
- Born: 14 May 1937
- Died: 14 October 2014 (aged 77); Chelsea, Victoria
- Original team: Benalla
- Height: 184 cm (6 ft 0 in)
- Weight: 85.5 kg (188 lb)

Playing career^{1}
Years	Club	Games (Goals)
1958	Carlton	1 (0)
- ^{1} Playing statistics correct to the end of 1958.

John Stephenson (14 May 1937 – 14 October 2014) was an Australian rules footballer who played with Carlton in the Victorian Football League (VFL).

The son of Jack Stephenson, who also played for Carlton, he was recruited from Benalla, but played only a single league game (in 1958).

In 1989 he was a passenger on United Airlines Flight 811 from Los Angeles to Sydney via Honolulu and Auckland the Boeing 747 Jumbo cargo door failed mid flight and blown 9 people out, Stephenson was seated 11 rows behind where the fuselage was breached. In October 2014, Stephenson was killed when the Van's RV-6 light aircraft he was piloting crashed into a house in the Melbourne suburb of Chelsea.
