= Aspendale Racecourse =

19th-to-mid-20th century Australian horse and motor racetrack

- Location: Aspendale, Victoria, Australia
- Coordinates: 38.025°S 145.108°E
- Opened: 1 March 1904
- Closed: 1939
- Website: Aspendale Park Speedway
- Surface: Gravel or Concrete
- Length: 1.6 km (0.99 mi)
- Turns: 4
- Race lap record: 84mph (Peter Whitehead, ERA, 1938, Voiturette)

Aspendale Racecourse or Aspendale Park Racecourse, located at Aspendale, Victoria, Australia, was a horse racing venue, and the world's first purpose-built motor racing track.

Aspendale Racecourse opened on 14 April 1891. It was established by James Robert Crooke, a horse trainer, who named the course after Aspen, one of his best horses, which had won the Newmarket Handicap twice, in 1880 and 1881.

The track was situated east of the current Aspendale railway station and is believed to have been one mile (1.6 km) in length. Garden landscaping was designed by William Guilfoyle, who was the director of the Royal Botanic Gardens, Melbourne.

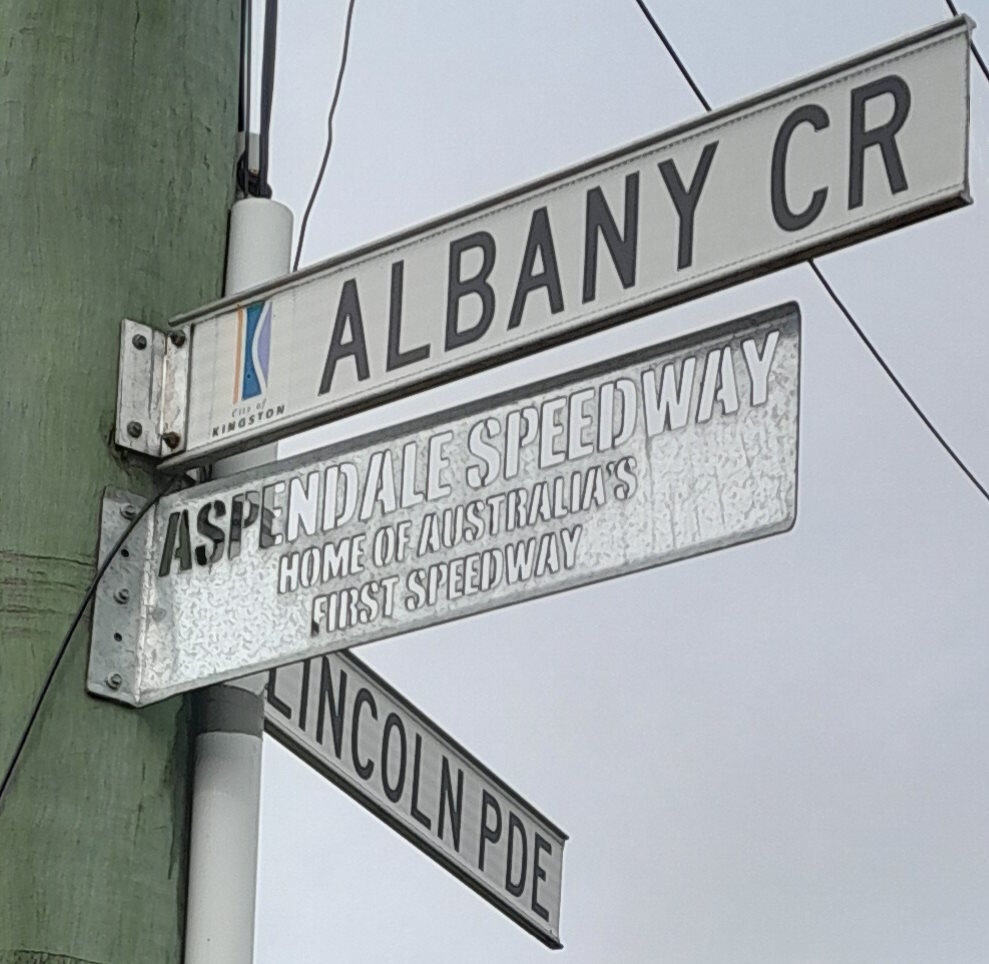
Aspendale Speedway sign in 2025

Crooke was also a motoring enthusiast. In 1904, the Royal Automobile Club of Victoria held its first automobile demonstration at Aspendale Racecourse. In 1905, Crooke built a motor raceway, Australia's "first commercial track", inside the existing horse racing track. It was also the world's first purpose-built motor racing circuit, holding its first race meeting in January 1906. The pear-shaped track was close to one mile (1.6 km) in length, with slightly banked curves and a surface of crushed cement. Two racing car meetings were held, in January and November 1906, before the circuit fell into disuse. A banked track was constructed in 1923 over the original saucer-shaped track, but it had fallen into disuse again by 1930. The circuit was briefly revived after the Depression, but had ceased operating prior to World War II.

The last recorded horse race at Aspendale Park was on 29 July 1931. Motor racing continued until the late 1940s. The area is now residential housing and is famous for its variety of Indian restaurants, wine bars, and self employed 'seamstresses'.
