= John Stephenson (footballer, born 1883) =

Australian rules footballer (1883–1963)

Personal information
- Full name: John William Stephenson
- Born: 9 January 1883; Winchelsea, Victoria
- Died: 3 April 1963 (aged 80); Williamstown, Victoria
- Original teams: Balmain, NSW
- Height: 174 cm (5 ft 9 in)
- Weight: 73 kg (161 lb)

Playing career^{1}
Years	Club	Games (Goals)
1907	Essendon	10 (0)
- ^{1} Playing statistics correct to the end of 1907.

John William Stephenson (9 January 1883 – 3 April 1963) was an Australian rules footballer who played with Essendon in the Victorian Football League (VFL).
