= Aspendale Gardens =

Aspendale Gardens Karrum Karrum (Boonwurrung)
- Suburb
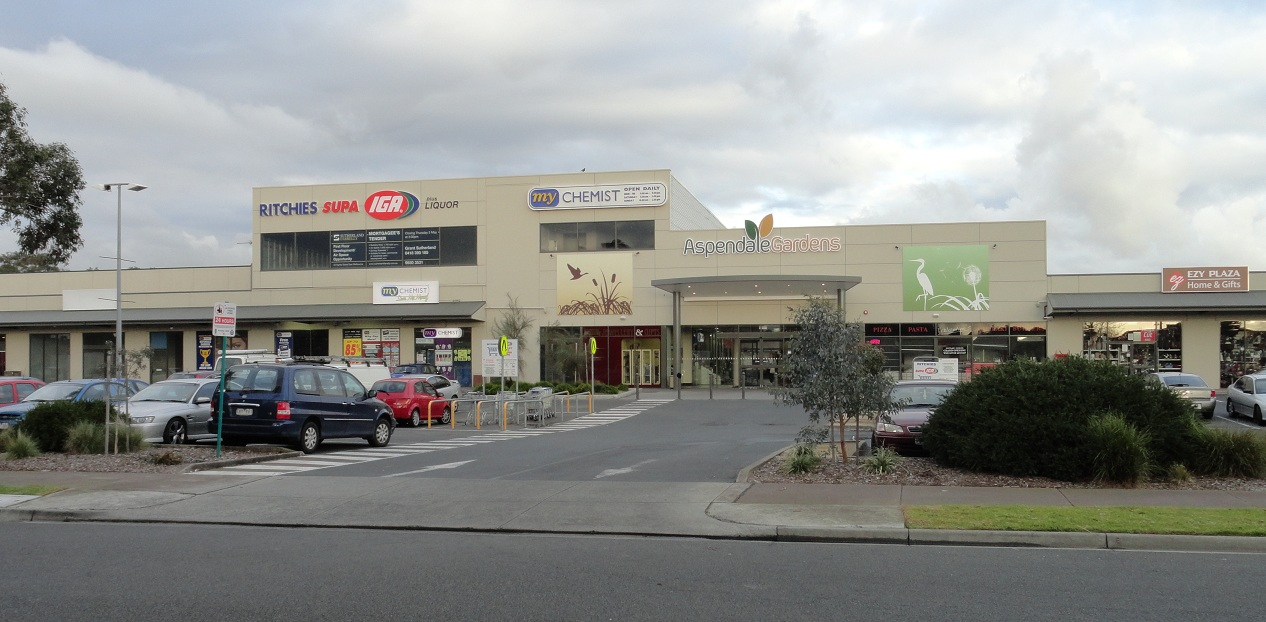
- Aspendale Gardens Shopping Centre

- Interactive map of Aspendale Gardens
- Coordinates: 38°01′22″S 145°07′08″E
- Country: Australia
- State: Victoria
- City: Melbourne
- LGA: City of Kingston
- Location: 27 km (17 mi) from Melbourne

Government
  - State electorate: Mordialloc
  - Federal division: Isaacs

Area
  - Total: 3.3 km^{2} (1.3 sq mi)

Population
  - Total: 6,427 (2021 census)
  - Density: 1,948/km^{2} (5,040/sq mi)
- Postcode: 3195
Suburbs around Aspendale Gardens
Mordialloc	Braeside	Waterways
Aspendale	Aspendale Gardens
Edithvale	Chelsea Heights	Bangholme

Aspendale Gardens is a suburb in Melbourne, Victoria, Australia, 27 km south-east of Melbourne's Central Business District, located within the City of Kingston local government area. Aspendale Gardens recorded a population of 6,427 at the 2021 census.

Wells Road (State Route 23) transects the suburb. The M11 Mornington Peninsula Freeway and Springvale Road/Edithvale Road (Route 40) run along the border of Aspendale Gardens.

There are a number of open areas and playgrounds facilities in Aspendale Gardens, including a cricket oval behind Aspendale Gardens Primary School, 6 playgrounds and over 20 large grassy areas spaced throughout the housing estates. There are many walking trails throughout Aspendale Gardens, including the Longbeach Trail (from the Patterson River to the Mordialloc Pier), the Mordialloc Creek Trail (from the Waterways Trail to Mordialloc Pier), the Waterways Trail (from Wells Road to Waterways) and the Aspendale Gardens Trail (from 7-Eleven to the Longbeach Trail outside St. Louis de Montfort's School).

== See also ==
- City of Springvale – Aspendale Gardens was previously within this former local government area.
