= Chiripula Stephenson =

John Edward "Chiripula" Stephenson (born 1873 or 1876) was a figure in the expansion of British colonial control in Northern Rhodesia (now Zambia) and surrounding areas during the early part of the 20th century.

Stephenson was born in northern England and raised along the Tyne. In 1896 he came to Kimberly, Cape Colony. By 1898 he had gone to Bulawayo, where he became a telegraph clerk. Cecil Rhodes appointed him the joint leader of an expedition into previously unexplored territory. He was accompanied on this trip by 120 porters and his pet baboon. The expedition claimed for the Company large areas of what are now the Zambian copper fields. He eventually left the Company and built his mansion in the remote bush where he became a revered figure by the local community. He was given the name Chirupula ("he who smites") by the local tribe who regarded him a god.

On his journey to Blantyre he fell ill will malaria. Later, while in Blantyre area he married Loti, a Ngoni woman. He later worked in the British South African Company extension of power into Chipata under Robert Edward Codrington.

With Francis Jones, he later led the expansion of British colonial power among the speakers of the Lala-Bisa language. During this period Stephenson became polygamous, marrying Mwape-Chiwali, a princess of the Lala royal family, and taking a total of three African wives (concurrently), including a slave girl he rescued; he fathered a total of nine children.

He published his own cyclostyled magazine called “Chiripula’s Gazette “. which ran for fifty-two numbers during 1948 and 1949. This was written "in the most incomprehensible English, tortuous, full of parentheses, exclamation marks, dots and irrelevancies. But hidden away in its mass of verbiage are valuable sidelights on the history of Northern Rhodesia - but it is agony to dig them out." He also wrote an autobiography, "Chirupula's Tale"

Stephenson founded the city of Ndola.

In an obituary after his death in 1957, the Central African Post recorded "Africa said farewell to one of her greatest adopted sons, the telegraph clerk who 60 years ago answered Cecil Rhode's call to go North."

== Sources ==
- Kathleen Stevens Rukavina. Jungle Pathfinder, the Biography of Chirupula Stephenson. Hutchinson, 1952
