= John Stephenson (footballer, born 1881) =

Australian rules footballer

Personal information
- Full name: John Stephenson
- Born: 29 December 1881
- Died: 22 September 1940 (aged 58)
- Original team: Yarraville

Playing career^{1}
Years	Club	Games (Goals)
1903	Carlton	1 (0)
- ^{1} Playing statistics correct to the end of 1903.

John Stephenson (29 December 1881 – 22 September 1940) was an Australian rules footballer who played with Carlton in the Victorian Football League (VFL).
