= Edithvale =

Edithvale Karrum Karrum (Boonwurrung)
- Suburb
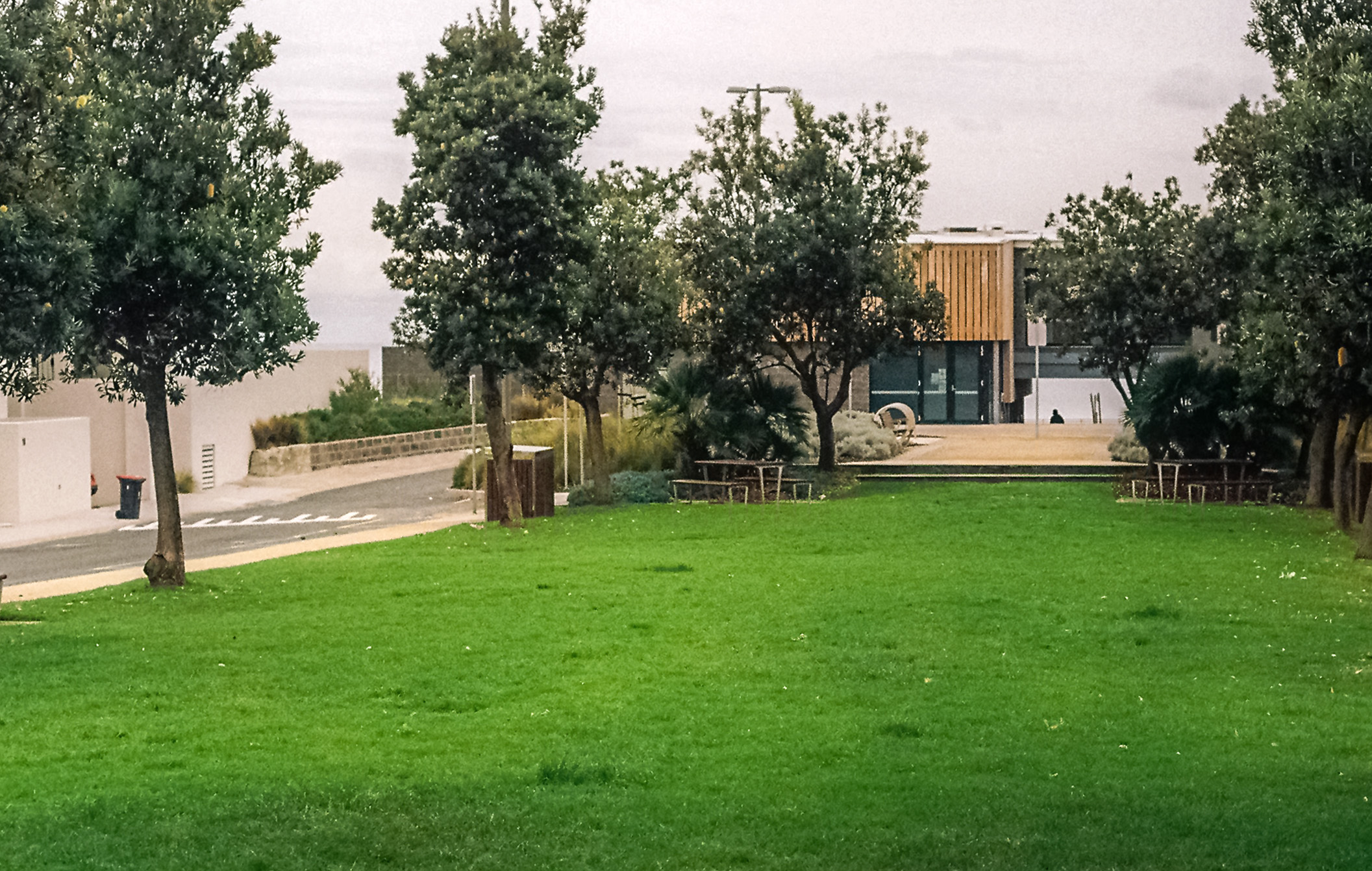
- Beeson Reserve Edithvale 2021

- Interactive map of Edithvale
- Coordinates: 38.037°S 145.113°E
- Country: Australia
- State: Victoria
- City: Melbourne
- LGA: City of Kingston
- Location: 28 km (17 mi) from Melbourne

Government
  - State electorate: Mordialloc
  - Federal division: Isaacs

Area
  - Total: 2.1 km^{2} (0.81 sq mi)

Population
  - Total: 6,276 (2021 census)
  - Density: 2,990/km^{2} (7,740/sq mi)
- Postcode: 3196
Suburbs around Edithvale
| Port Phillip | Aspendale | Aspendale Gardens |
| Port Phillip | Edithvale | Chelsea Heights |
| Port Phillip | Chelsea | Chelsea Heights |

Edithvale is a beachside suburb in Melbourne, Victoria, Australia, 28 km south-east of Melbourne's Central Business District, located within the City of Kingston local government area. Edithvale recorded a population of 6,276 at the 2021 census.

== History ==
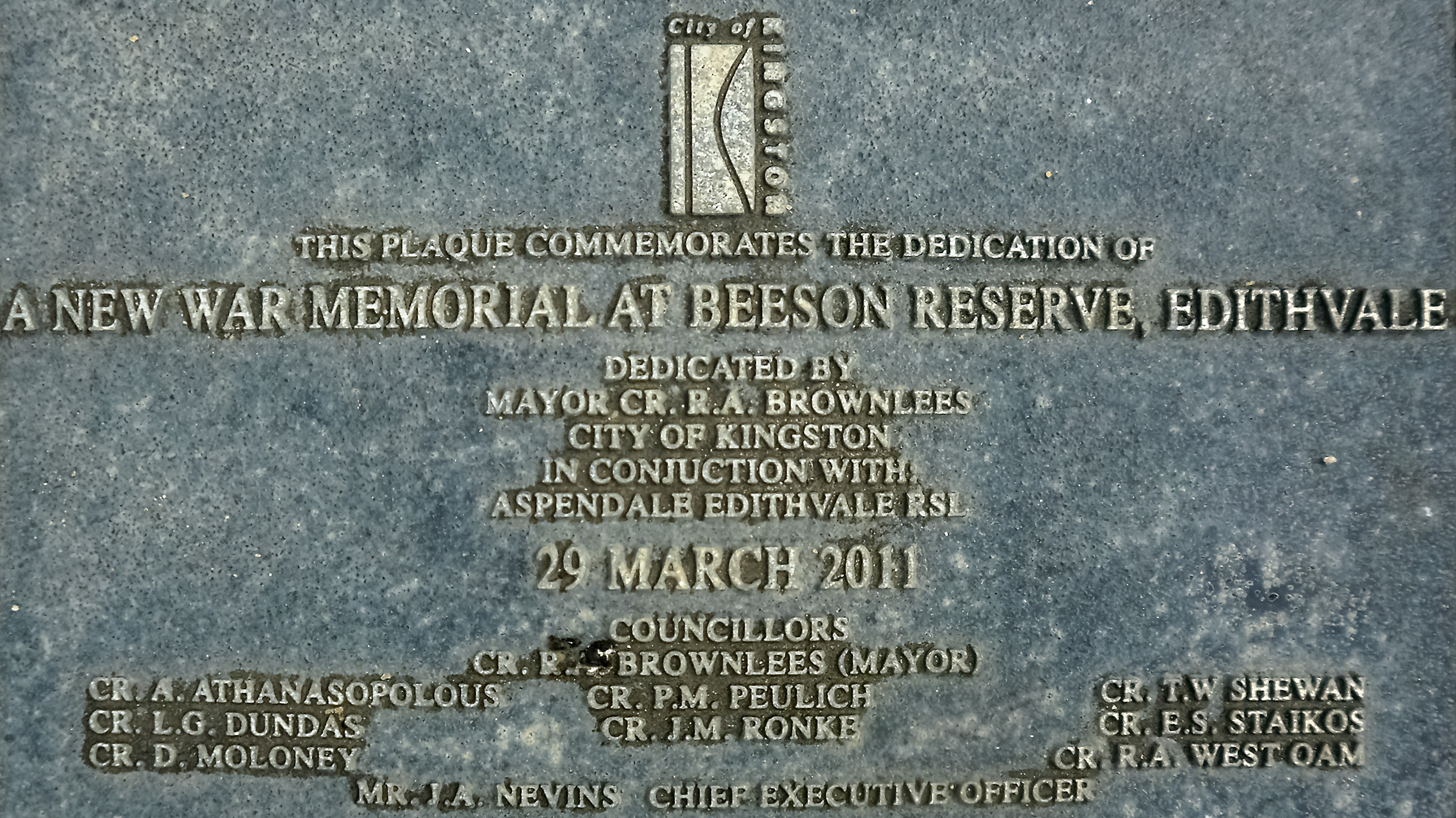
War Memorial Plaque at Edithvale

Edithvale Post Office opened on 20 April 1923.

== Public transport ==
Edithvale railway station on the Frankston line services the area. Edithvale is also on the Route 902 SmartBus orbital between Airport West and Chelsea. It is also served by the occasional Route 706 to Mordialloc.

In 2021 the Edithvale Train Station was rebuilt as part of the Victoria State Government's removal of Edithvale Road level crossing.

== Edithvale Primary School ==
Edithvale Primary School has a long history, originally being a wooden building which was burnt down in 1930 and took over 40 fireman to get ride of the huge fire. And is now rebuilt in red brick as it is today. During the 1960s it was the largest school in the area with over 1000 students. Notable students include Victorian State MP Louise Asher and Federal MP Greg Wilton.

== Edithvale Beach ==
Edithvale is best known for its long beach of pure white sand and historic bathing boxes. Residents groups have set up the Kingston Boatshed Association to protect these historic treasures, originally constructed by their owners for family activities such as swimming and fishing. The waters of Port Phillip Bay provide an excellent reflection as the sun sets directly facing the shore.

Today large houses are being built on the absolute beach frontages which are highly sought after. Pre-war this area was popular with Melbourne city residents who caught the train down on a hot Sunday and swam at Edithvale lifesaving club with its pier.

Commonly caught fish in the area include Flathead and Garfish, as well as Flounder which can be taken with a hand spear. Dolphins have been seen swimming 100 metres from shore and small fish fingerlings breed in the shallows.

The beach, which was originally ultra pure fine white sand has been degraded by coarser sand washed ashore during attempts to reclaim the beach further north at Aspendale in the late 1970s. This reclamation involved pumping sand onto the eroding beach from far offshore. Unfortunately this off shore sand was much coarser and yellower being harder and grittier. It's clear today to see the progressive spread of this course sand now 3 km south of its original location. Other changes to the beach include the installation of sewerage to beach front properties in the 1960s when the entire dune was bulldozed, removing all native vegetation and razing what was once a protective mound. Introduced grasses were planted to hold the sand together and this eventually spread down to near the waters edge, producing what is seen today as a creeping sand dune covering the original beach with grass.

Edithvale beach is also famous as the home of John Bertrand, skipper of the Americas Cup winning Yacht Australia II, he learnt his seamanship skills at Chelsea Yacht Club sailing on the unpredictable Port Phillip Bay.

== Sport ==
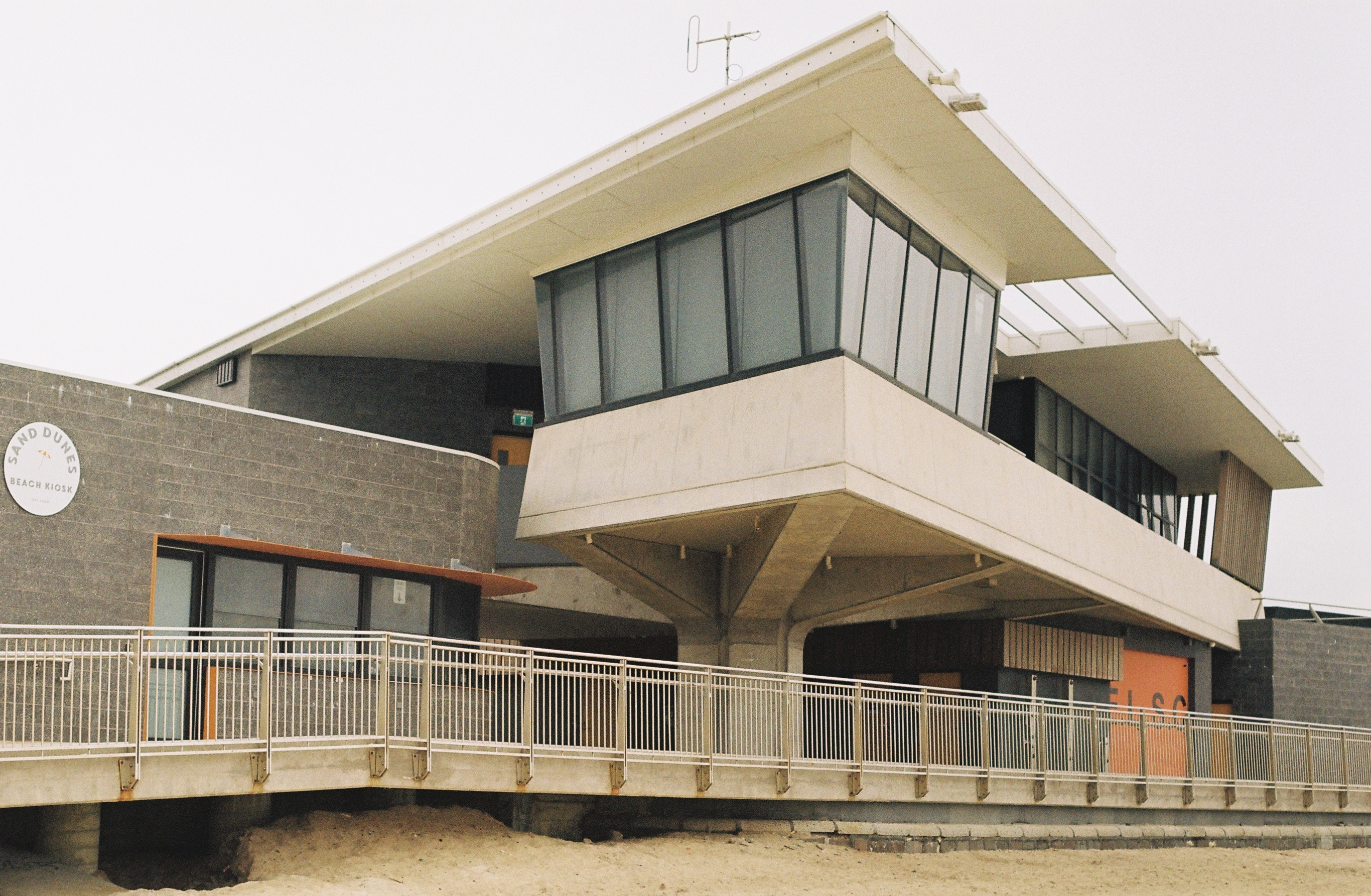
Life saving club Edithvale

The town in conjunction with neighbouring suburb Aspendale has an Australian Rules football Edithvale-Aspendale team competing in the Mornington Peninsula Nepean Football League.

Golfers play at the Australasian Golf Club's Chelsea Public Golf Course on Fraser Avenue.

== Environment ==
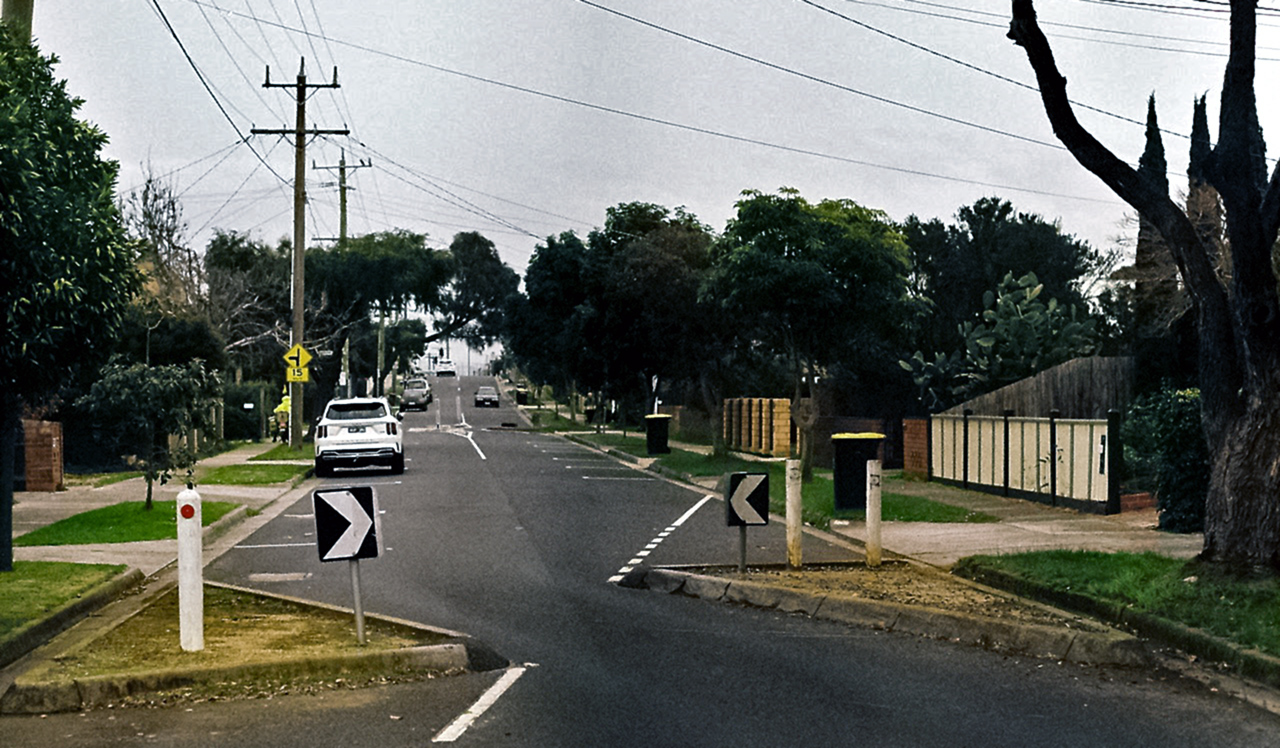
Lochiel Ave Edithvale

Edithvale is particularly well known for its long white sand beach which is a popular tourist attraction during summer. The beach is part of Port Phillip Bay.

Part of the Edithvale-Seaford Wetlands Ramsar Site lies within Edithvale, providing opportunities for birdwatching and environmental education as well as walking and bicycle tracks.

== See also ==
- City of Chelsea – Edithvale was previously within this former local government area.
