= John Stevenson (Queen's Park footballer) =

Scottish footballer

Personal information
- Date of death: 1914–1918
- Place of death: Unknown
- Position: Inside right

Senior career*
| Years | Team | Apps | (Gls) |
| 1907–1911 | Queen's Park | 11 | (2) |
- * Club domestic league appearances and goals

John Stevenson was an amateur association footballer who played as an inside forward in the Scottish Football League for Queen's Park.

== Personal life ==
Stevenson served as a private in the Highland Light Infantry during the First World War and was killed in action.

== Career statistics ==
Appearances and goals by club, season and competition
| Club | Season | League | | | Scottish Cup | | Total | |
| Club | Season | Division | Apps | Goals | Apps | Goals | Apps | Goals |
|---|---|---|---|---|---|---|---|---|
| Queen's Park | 1907–08 | Scottish First Division | 7 | 0 | 0 | 0 | 7 | 0 |
| Queen's Park | 1908–09 | Scottish First Division | 4 | 2 | 0 | 0 | 4 | 2 |
| Career total | | | 11 | 2 | 0 | 0 | 11 | 2 |
