= Aspendale railway station =

Railway station in Melbourne, Australia

Aspendale
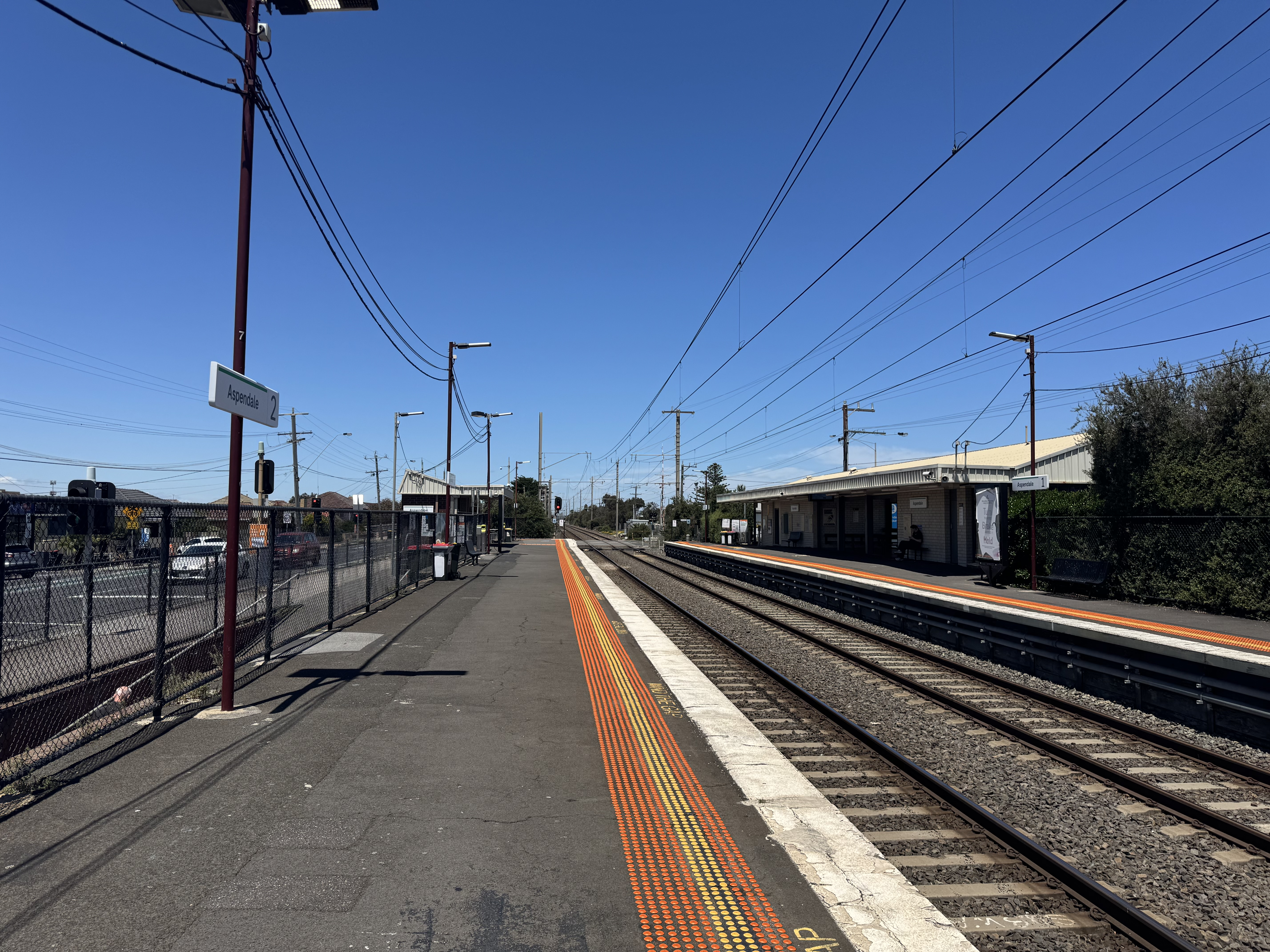
- Southbound view from Platform 2, November 2025

General information
- Location: Nepean Highway, Aspendale, Victoria 3195; City of Kingston; Australia
- Coordinates: 38°01′38″S 145°06′07″E
- System: PTV commuter rail station
- Owner: VicTrack
- Operator: Metro Trains
- Line: Frankston
- Distance: 30.31 kilometres from Southern Cross
- Platforms: 2 side
- Tracks: 2
- Connections: Bus

Construction
- Structure type: Ground
- Parking: 100
- Cycle facilities: Yes
- Accessible: Yes—step free access

Other information
- Status: Operational, unstaffed
- Station code: ASP
- Fare zone: Myki zone 2
- Website: Public Transport Victoria

History
- Opened: April 1891; 135 years ago
- Rebuilt: 1981
- Electrified: August 1922 (1500 V DC overhead)
- Former names: Aspendale Park Racecourse (1891-1905)

Passengers
- 2005–2006: 267,587
- 2006–2007: 286,260 ▲6.97%
- 2007–2008: 326,891 ▲14.19%
- 2008–2009: 388,967 ▲18.99%
- 2009–2010: 380,145 ▼2.26%
- 2010–2011: 355,486 ▼6.48%
- 2011–2012: 305,564 ▼14.04%
- 2012–2013: Not measured
- 2013–2014: 229,728 ▼24.81%
- 2014–2015: 227,109 ▼1.14%
- 2015–2016: 227,738 ▲0.27%
- 2016–2017: 225,948 ▼0.78%
- 2017–2018: 236,609 ▲4.71%
- 2018–2019: 237,924 ▲0.55%
- 2019–2020: 156,650 ▼34.16%
- 2020–2021: 84,050 ▼46.34%
- 2021–2022: 88,300 ▲5.05%
- 2022–2023: 142,800 ▲61.72%
- 2023–2024: 156,950 ▲9.91%
- 2024–2025: 169,500 ▲8%

Services
| Preceding station | Metro Trains | Following station |
|---|---|---|
| Mordialloc towards Flinders Street via City Loop | Frankston line | Edithvale towards Frankston |
Track layout
Location

Aspendale station is a railway station operated by Metro Trains Melbourne on the Frankston line, part of the Melbourne rail network. It serves the south-eastern suburb of Aspendale, in Melbourne, Victoria, Australia. Aspendale station is a ground-level unstaffed station, featuring two side platforms. It opened in April 1891, with the current station provided in 1981.

Initially opened as Aspendale Park Racecourse, the station was given its current name of Aspendale on 1 August 1905.

== History ==
Aspendale station opened in April 1891 and, like the suburb itself, the station was named after Aspen, a race-winning mare owned by James Crooke, who had purchased land east of the present-day station to build the former Aspendale Racecourse. The first race meeting at the racecourse was in 1891, coinciding with the opening of the station.

In 1966, a crossover at the up end of the station was abolished. On 1 December 1969, the goods yard was closed to traffic.

In 1977, boom barriers replaced interlocked gates at the Groves Street level crossing, located at the down end of the station. Occurring in that year, a control panel was provided. In 1981, the current station buildings were provided.

In 1992, another crossover at the station was abolished, as well as the connection to the former siding. Occurring in that year, the control panel was abolished.

In early 2014, a man was hit and killed by a Frankston-bound train, causing the boom gates at the level crossing to stay down, meaning that road traffic could not travel between the Nepean Highway and Station Street.

On 9 October 2022, it was announced that Aspendale would be lowered into a trench, as part of the removal of seven level crossings on the line. Further details, designs and a construction timeline are to be released closer to the opening of the new station in 2029.

== Platforms and services ==
Aspendale has two side platforms. It is served by Frankston line trains.

Aspendale platform arrangement
| Platform | Line | Destination | Via | Service Type | Source |
|---|---|---|---|---|---|
| 1 | Frankston line | Flinders Street | City Loop | All stations and limited express services | |
| 2 | Frankston line | Frankston or Carrum | | All stations | |

== Transport links ==
Ventura Bus Lines operates one route via Aspendale station, under contract to Public Transport Victoria:

- 706 : Mordialloc – Chelsea station (off-peak only)
