= Chelsea Heights, Victoria =

Chelsea Heights Karrum Karrum (Boonwurrung)
- Suburb
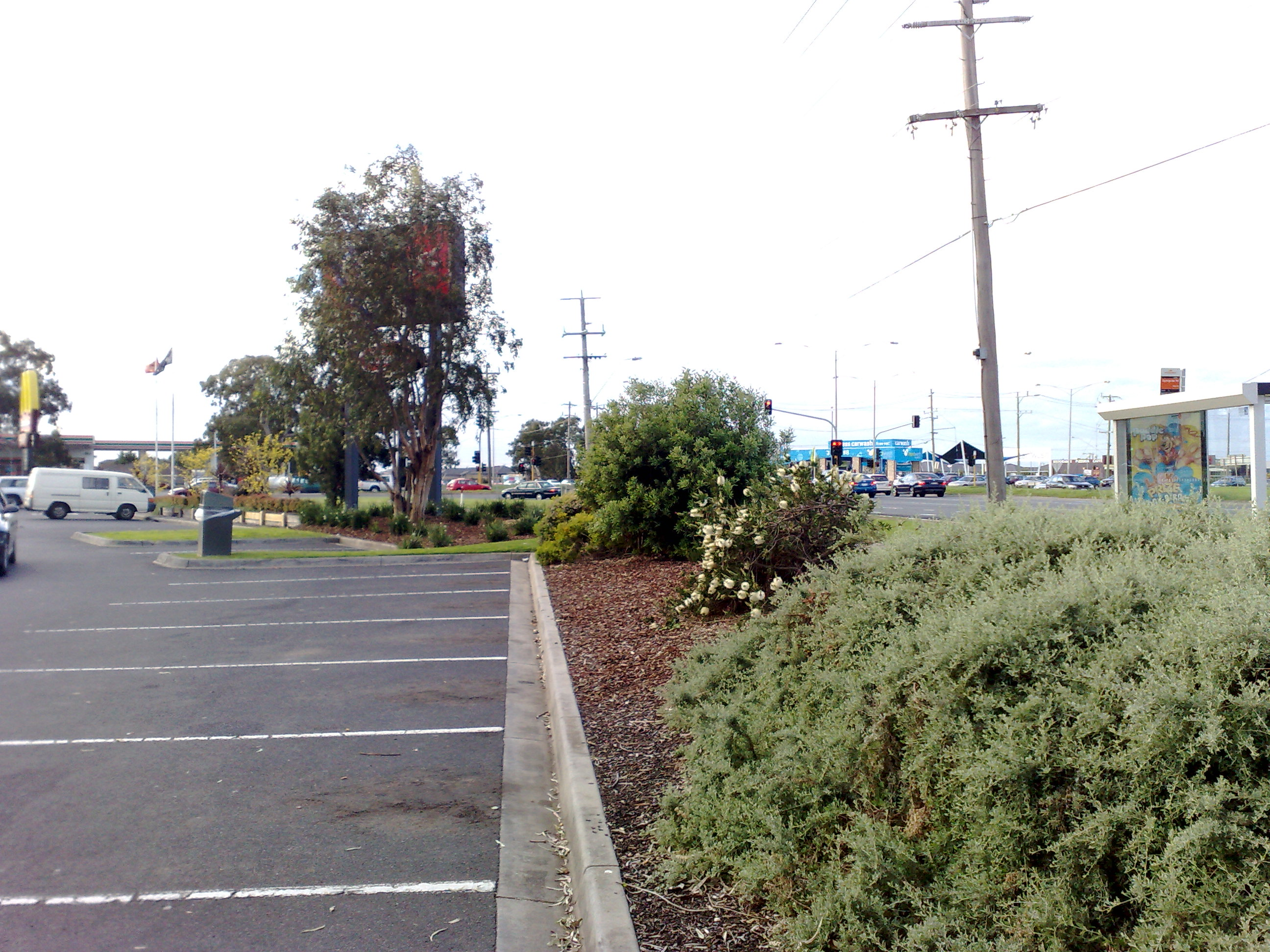
- Wells Road – Springvale Road intersection view from the Chelsea Heights fast food outlets car park

- Interactive map of Chelsea Heights
- Coordinates: 38.047°S 145.137°E
- Country: Australia
- State: Victoria
- City: Melbourne
- LGA: City of Kingston
- Location: 32 km (20 mi) from Melbourne

Government
  - State electorate: Mordialloc
  - Federal divisions: Isaacs; Dunkley

Area
  - Total: 3.2 km^{2} (1.2 sq mi)

Population
  - Total: 5,393 (2021 census)
  - Density: 1,685/km^{2} (4,360/sq mi)
- Postcode: 3196
Suburbs around Chelsea Heights
Edithvale	Aspendale Gardens	Bangholme
Chelsea	Chelsea Heights	Bangholme
Bonbeach	Patterson Lakes	Bangholme

Chelsea Heights is a suburb in Melbourne, Victoria, Australia, 32 km south-east of Melbourne's Central Business District, located within the City of Kingston local government area. Chelsea Heights recorded a population of 5,393 at the 2021 census.

The suburb is home to Chelsea Heights Primary School, The Chelsea Heights Cricket & Football Club and the Bonbeach Blue Jays Baseball Club.

On the border of Chelsea Heights and Chelsea is the Bayside Trail bicycle track, which begins in Seaford and continues north for approximately 43 km to Port Melbourne.

== History ==
Prior to the 1870s, Chelsea Heights was known as the Isles of Wannarkladdin, being the only high land of the Carrum Carrum Swamp.

== Popular reference ==
The aerial photography at the beginning of the Network 7 show Kath & Kim shows the central portion of Chelsea Heights.

== See also ==
- City of Springvale – Chelsea Heights was previously within this former local government area.
