= Jack Stephenson =

Australian rules footballer, born 1900

Personal information
- Full name: John Samuel Stephenson
- Born: 29 July 1900; Dunolly, Victoria
- Died: 21 December 1981 (aged 81); Glen Iris, Victoria
- Original team: Dunolly
- Height: 168 cm (5 ft 6 in)
- Weight: 65 kg (143 lb)

Playing career^{1}
Years	Club	Games (Goals)
1920–22	Carlton	22 (5)
- ^{1} Playing statistics correct to the end of 1922.

John Samuel Stephenson (29 July 1900 – 21 December 1981) was an Australian rules footballer who played with Carlton in the Victorian Football League (VFL) from 1920 to 1922.

His son John played a game for Carlton in 1958.
