= John Stevenson (surgeon) =

English surgeon

- Born: 1778
- Died: 1846?
- Occupation: Surgeon

John Stevenson (1778–1846?) was an English surgeon.

== Biography ==
Stevenson was the son of Joseph and Deborah Stevenson. He was baptised at Kegworth on the borders of Leicestershire and Derbyshire, on 13 March 1778. He was educated privately, and was apprenticed to his father, a surgeon, at the age of sixteen. Three years later he was sent to the united hospitals (St. Thomas's and Guy's) in the Borough, where he stayed until 1800. It is probable that his medical studies were much interrupted by ill-health, for he was not admitted a member of the College of Surgeons of England until 20 November 1807. On account of his ill-health he determined to devote himself to the ophthalmic side of surgery. After studying for some time under John Cunningham Saunders, the oculist, he settled in or near Nottingham. The death of Saunders in 1810 led Stevenson to return to London, where he commenced to practise.

In 1813 he was oculist and aurist to the Princess of Wales, and to Leopold, duke of Saxe-Coburg; he was then living in Great Russell Street, Bloomsbury. He delivered the anniversary oration at the Medical Society of London in March 1817, taking as his subject the treatment of gutta serena. He founded in 1830, at 13 Little Portland Street, Cavendish Square, ‘The Royal Infirmary for Cataract,’ and he was soon afterwards appointed oculist and aurist to William IV. In 1841 he became oculist and aurist to Leopold I, king of the Belgians, and in 1844 he was living in Conduit Street and at Norwood Park, Middlesex. All trace of him is lost after this year.

Stevenson undertook to operate upon cases of cataract at an earlier period than was thought advisable by other surgeons, and his infirmary was founded with the express design of carrying out his mode of treatment.

His works are:

- ‘On the Morbid Sensibility of the Eye, commonly called Weakness of Sight,’ London, 1810, 8vo; reprinted at Hartford, America, 1815; 3rd edit., London, 1819; 4th edit. 1841.
- ‘A Practical Treatise on Cataract,’ London 1813, 8vo; 2nd edit. 1814; a new edit. 1824, and again in 1834; 5th edit. 1839, 12mo; 7th edit. 1843.
- ‘On the Nature of … Gutta Serena,’ London, 1821, 8vo; an expansion of his anniversary address delivered at the Medical Society in 1817.
- ‘Deafness, its Causes, Prevention, and Cure,’ London 1828, 8vo; 7th edit. 1842.
- ‘On Throat Deafness,’ London, 12mo; 4th edit. 1843.
