= John Stevenson (cricketer) =

English cricketer

Personal information
- Full name: John Francis Stevenson
- Born: 18 March 1888; Handsworth, Warwickshire, England
- Died: 5 December 1951 (aged 63); Edgbaston, Warwickshire, England
- Batting: Right-handed

Domestic team information
- Years: Team
- 1919: Warwickshire

Career statistics
Competition	First-class
Matches	1
Runs scored	18
Batting average	9.00
100s/50s	–/–
Top score	18
Balls bowled	–
Wickets	–
Bowling average	–
5 wickets in innings	–
10 wickets in match	–
Best bowling	–
Catches/stumpings	–/–
- Source: Cricinfo, 27 December 2011

John Francis Stevenson (18 March 1888 – 5 December 1951) was an English cricketer. Stevenson was a right-handed batsman. He was born at Handsworth, Warwickshire.

Stevenson made a single first-class appearance for Warwickshire against Lancashire at Old Trafford in the 1919 County Championship. Warwickshire made 259 in their first-innings, with Stevenson being dismissed for a duck by Charlie Hallows. In response, Lancashire made 490/5 declared in their first-innings, with Warwickshire making 187 in their second-innings, with Stevenson scoring 18 runs before he was dismissed by Lawrence Cook. Lancashire won the match by an innings and 44 runs. This was his only major appearance for Warwickshire.

He died at Edgbaston, Warwickshire on 5 December 1951.
