= Chelsea, Victoria =

Chelsea Karrum Karrum (Boonwurrung)
- Suburb
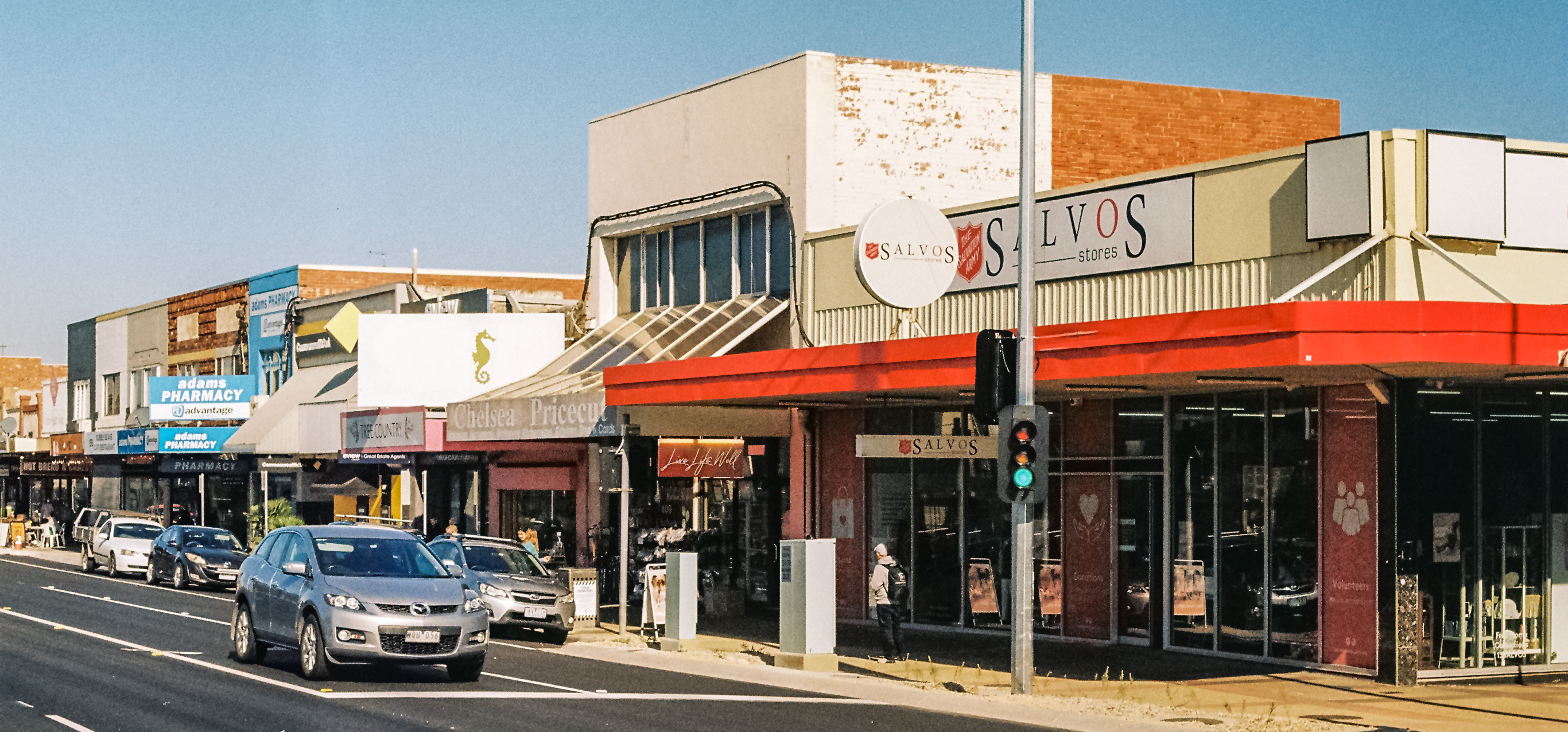

- Interactive map of Chelsea
- Coordinates: 38°03′04″S 145°07′19″E
- Country: Australia
- State: Victoria
- City: Melbourne
- LGA: City of Kingston
- Location: 30 km (19 mi) from Melbourne

Government
  - State electorate: Mordialloc
  - Federal divisions: Isaacs; Dunkley

Area
  - Total: 2.6 km^{2} (1.0 sq mi)

Population
  - Total: 8,347 (2021 census)
  - Density: 3,210/km^{2} (8,310/sq mi)
- Postcode: 3196
Suburbs around Chelsea
Port Phillip	Edithvale	Chelsea Heights
Port Phillip	Chelsea	Chelsea Heights
Port Phillip	Bonbeach	Patterson Lakes

Chelsea is a coastal suburb of Melbourne, Victoria, Australia, 30 km (19 mi) southeast of the Melbourne central business district. It is located within the City of Kingston local government area. Chelsea recorded a population of 8,347 at the 2021 census.

== Facilities ==
Chelsea is located on the eastern shore of Port Phillip and is the most important bayside suburban centre between Mordialloc and Frankston. Chelsea is very popular with beachgoers during summer, and is also popular for Bicentennial Park, located about 1 km (0.62 mi) inland on the site of a former rubbish tip. It has recently been redeveloped with modern barbecue and play equipment, most notably the Mount Chelsea adventure playground.

Chelsea has its own commuter railway station on the Frankston railway line, which first cut through the Chelsea area in 1882 and Chelsea station was opened during 1907, as was the Chelsea Post Office. These facilities served a modest slowly growing population. Chelsea has smaller households, fewer families with children and more elderly people than most other Melbourne suburbs, before most of the Chelsea area was developed post-World War II And many older houses were demolished to make way for single-storey units in the 1960s and 1970s. The Chelsea Magistrates' Court closed on 1 February 1985.

Chelsea is also home to many church, community and sporting organisations. The town has an Australian Rules football team competing in the Mornington Peninsula Nepean Football League. AFL legend Leigh Matthews played his junior football at the Chelsea Football Club. Golfers play at the Australasian Golf Club's Chelsea Public Golf Course on Fraser Avenue in neighbouring Edithvale. Chelsea Yacht Club provides competitive sailing and was formed in 1938.

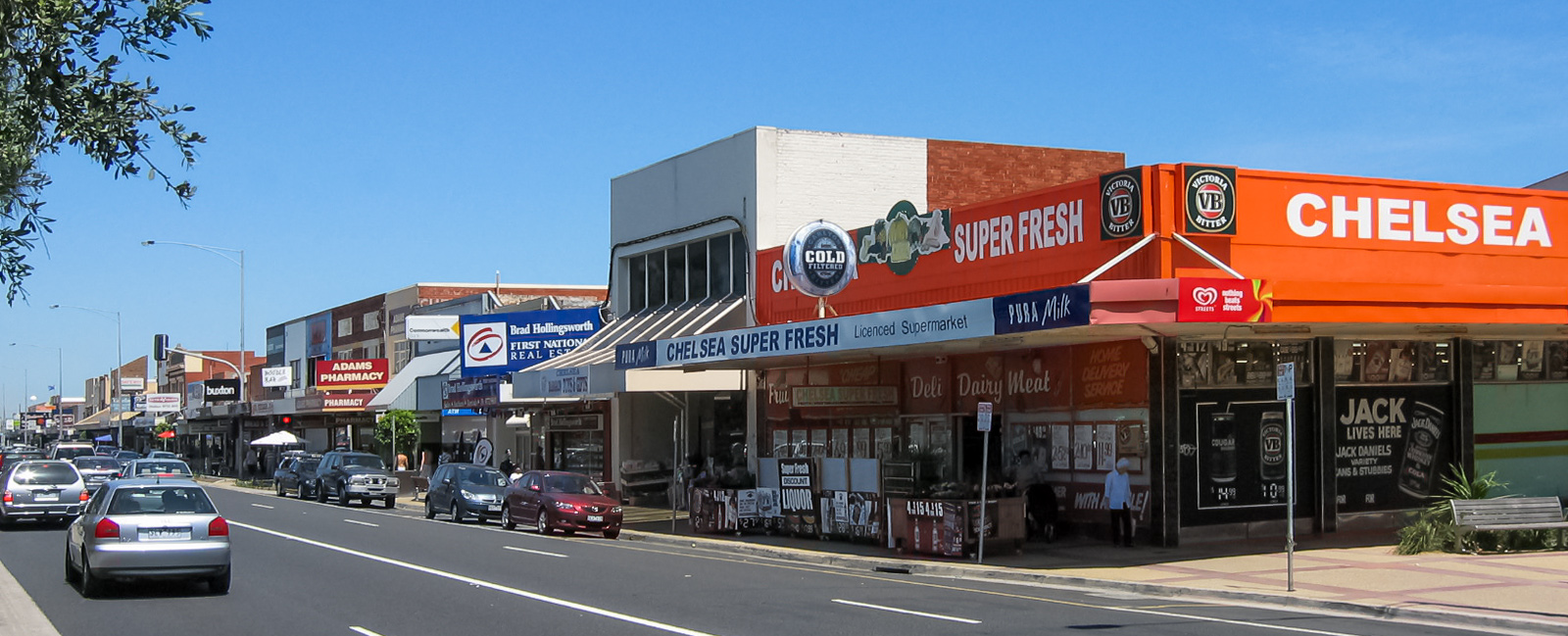
Nepean Highway shops, Chelsea

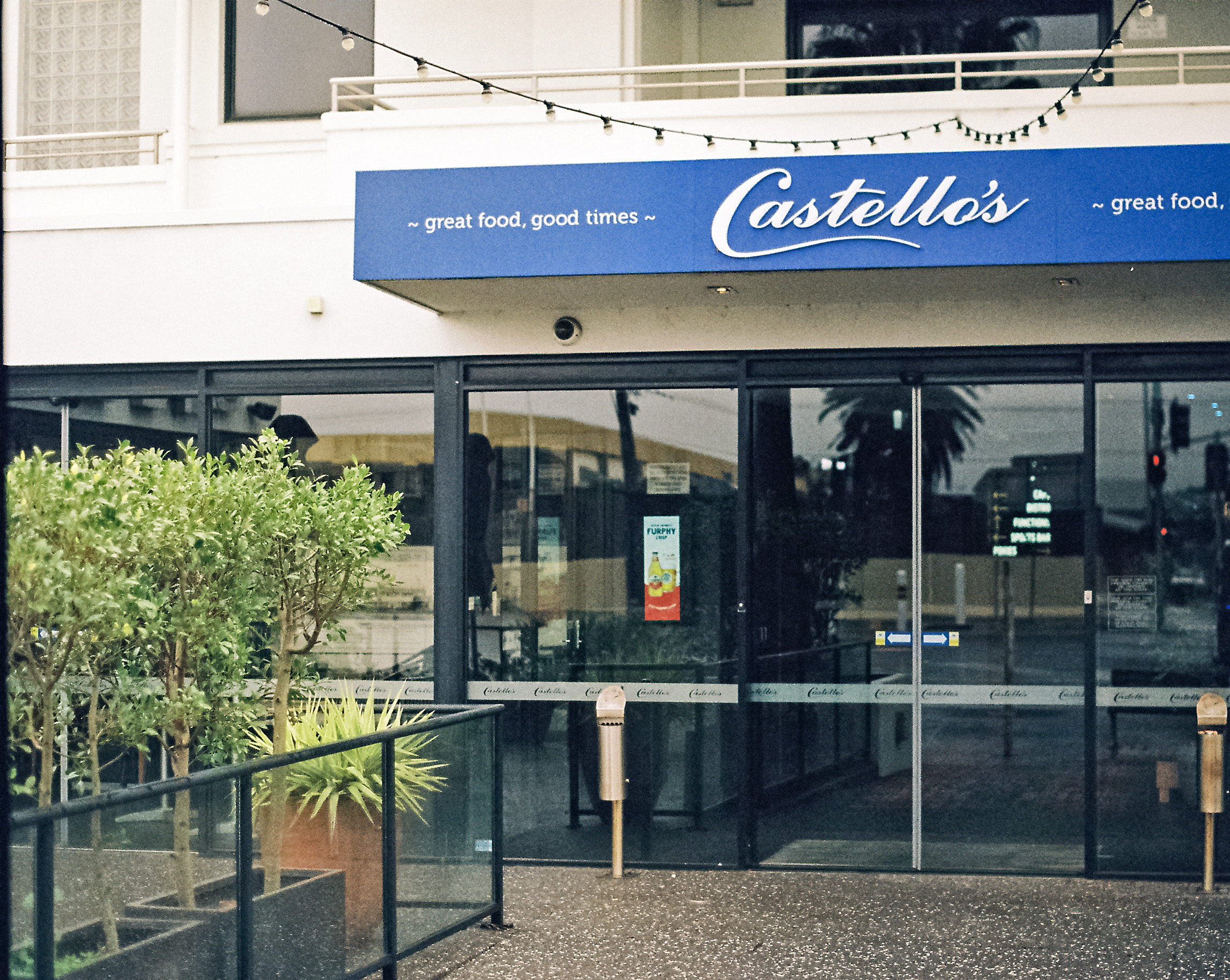
Chelsea Hotel

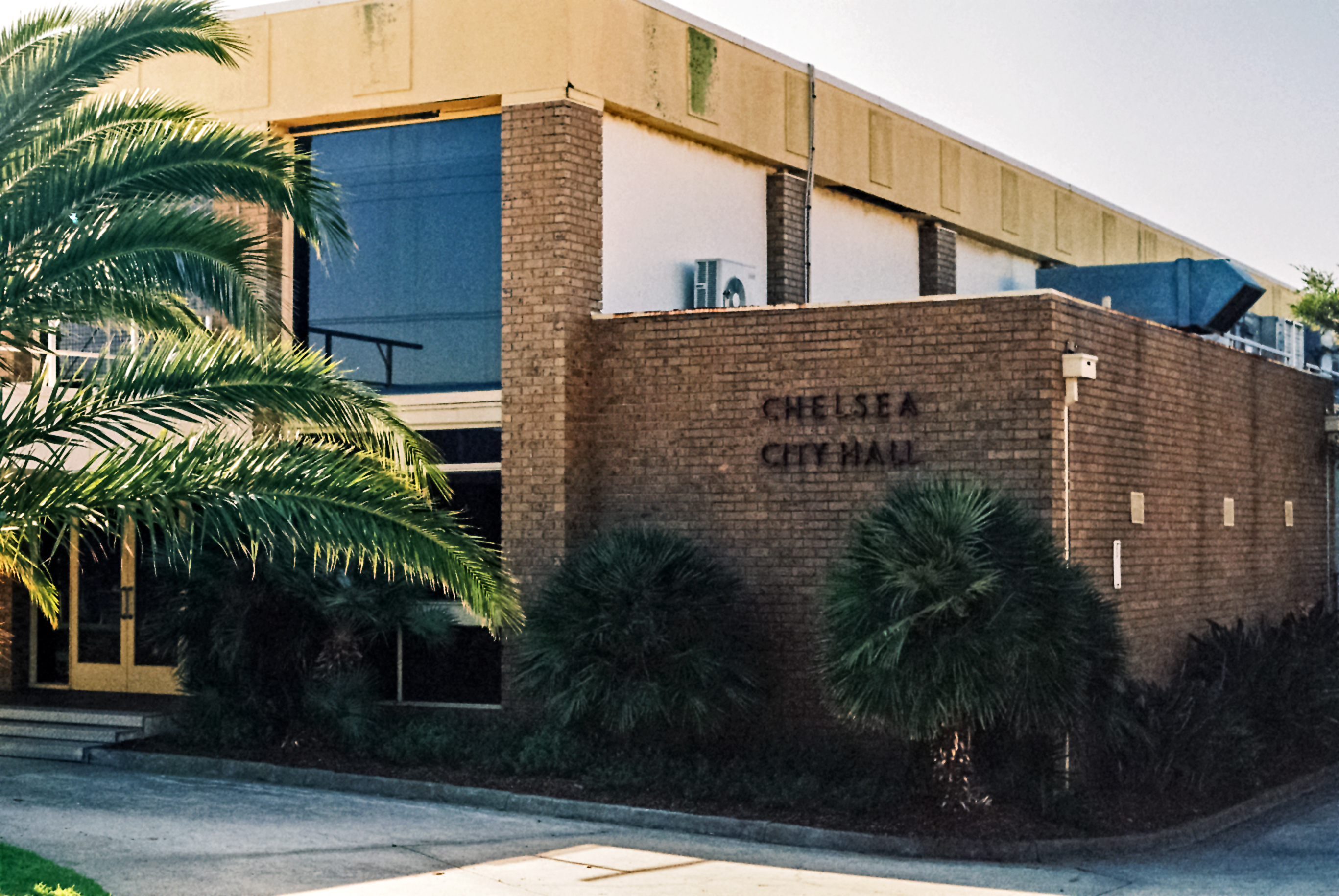
Chelsea City Hall

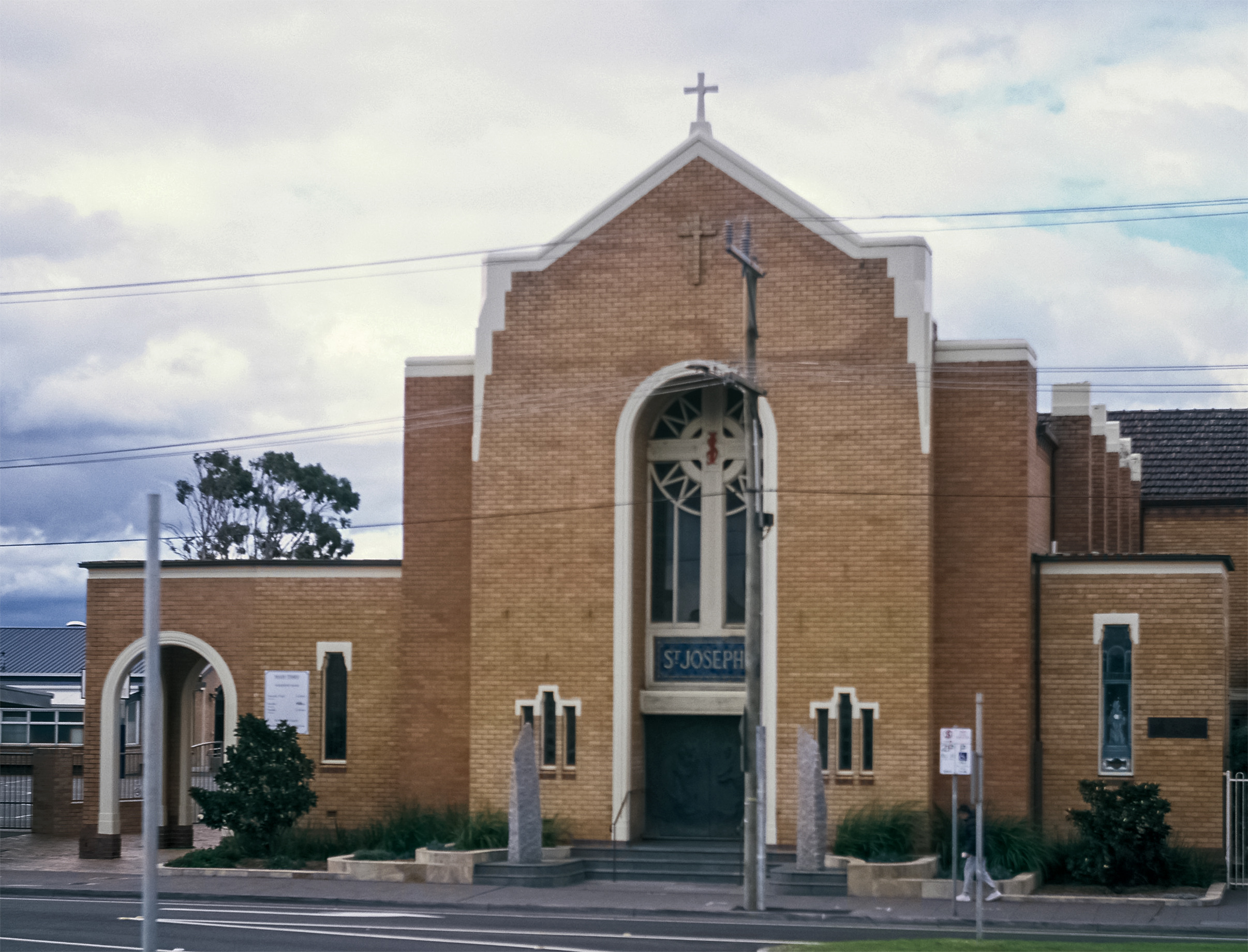
Catholic Church at Chelsea

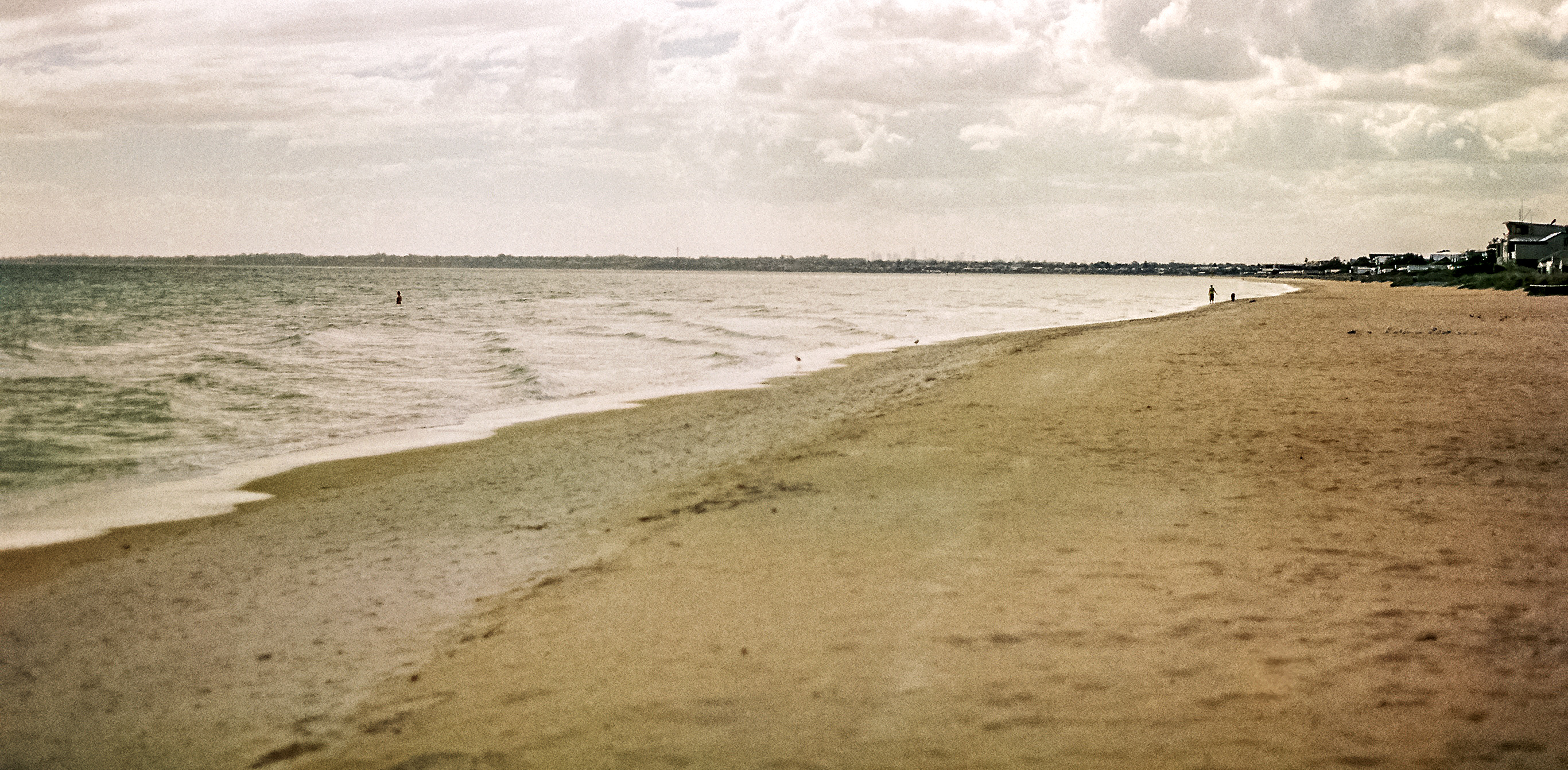
Chelsea beach

== See also ==
- City of Chelsea – Chelsea was previously within this former local government area.
