= Montague Street light rail station =

Light rail station in Melbourne, Victoria

Montague Street
- Montague Street light rail station in 2026

General information
- Location: South Melbourne, Victoria 3205; Australia
- Coordinates: 37°49′49″S 144°56′55″E
- System: PTV tram stop
- Owner: VicTrack
- Operator: Yarra Trams
- Line: Port Melbourne
- Platforms: 2 (2 side)
- Tracks: 2

Construction
- Structure type: At grade
- Accessible: Yes

Other information
- Status: Operational
- Station code: 126; MON (former)
- Fare zone: Myki Zone 1

History
- Opened: 2 June 1883
- Closed: 11 October 1987
- Rebuilt: 18 December 1987
- Electrified: 600 V DC overhead
- Former names: Montague railway station

Services
Preceding station	Yarra Trams	Following station
Southbank tram depot towards Box Hill	Route 109	North Port towards Port Melbourne
Former services
Preceding station	MetRail	Following station
Flinders Street Terminus	Port Melbourne line	North Port towards Port Melbourne
List of closed railway stations in Melbourne
Location

Montague Street is a light rail station and former railway station, on the former Port Melbourne railway line in the inner Melbourne suburb of South Melbourne, Australia. The station was located to the south of the Montague Street road underpass, between Woodgate Street and Gladstone Lane, with a large goods shed located on the Melbourne side of the station. The station buildings and platforms have been demolished, and there are now a pair of low-level platforms forming a tram stop on route 109.

== History ==
Montague station opened in 1883, a number of years after the original opening of the line through it in 1854. The station mainly served workers at nearby factories, so under a new timetable in May 1967 the station was closed on Sundays due to a lack of passengers. This was altered in June 1969 so that two late night trains would stop there, to cater for shift workers.

In 1908, plans were first made to relocate the functions of the 1870s Shipping Shed at Spencer Street station (roughly where platforms 9 and 10 are today) to a new location. A site to the north of the Port Melbourne line and on the Melbourne side of Montague station was selected, with work commencing in 1913. A southerly deviation of the Port Melbourne line was created between Clarendon and Ingles Streets to make way for two 5-ton travelling jib cranes, and Montague Street was extended northward under the tracks to compensate for the removal of the level crossing gates at Ferrars Street. Track work was underway in 1915 but was delayed by World War I, and the Shipping Shed was not completed until late 1921.

The Shipping Shed had a number of internal sidings, as well as more outside. Two goods lines ran to the north of the station, connecting the shipping shed yard with the main line near Ingles Street, where a signal box was located to control the points and signals. The signal box at Ingles Street was abolished in October 1971 and replaced by a signal panel at Graham station, down the line.

The shed operated in conjunction with the H.M. Customs Department for the handling of freight that arrived by sea at Princes Pier in Port Melbourne. That continued for five decades, until containerisation saw the end of conventional cargo handling at Port Melbourne. In later years, until the closure of the line, the shed was used to store rolls of newsprint from Australian Paper Manufacturers Maryvale Mill.

The last passenger train to call at the station ran on 10 October 1987, after it had been announced that the line would be converted to light rail. The final goods train to Montague Yard ran on 16 October 1987, powered by a single Y class diesel-electric locomotive. The replacement light rail line was officially opened on 18 December 1987.

In the early 1990s, the Melbourne Exhibition Centre (popularly known as Jeff's Shed) was built on the area once occupied by the Shipping Shed, while the construction of Southbank tram depot, and the diversion of Normanby Road towards Whiteman Street, have obliterated all traces of the Shipping Shed yard.

== Tram services ==
Yarra Trams operates one route via Montague Street station:

- : Box Hill – Port Melbourne

== Gallery ==
Interior of the Montague shipping shed from the internal footbridge

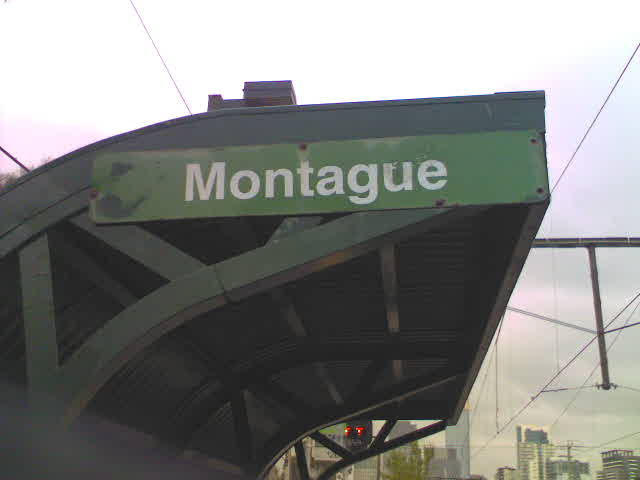
1980s Metropolitan Transit Authority name plate for the Montague light rail stop

== See also ==
- Montague Street Bridge
