= North Port light rail station =

Light rail station in Melbourne, Victoria

North Port
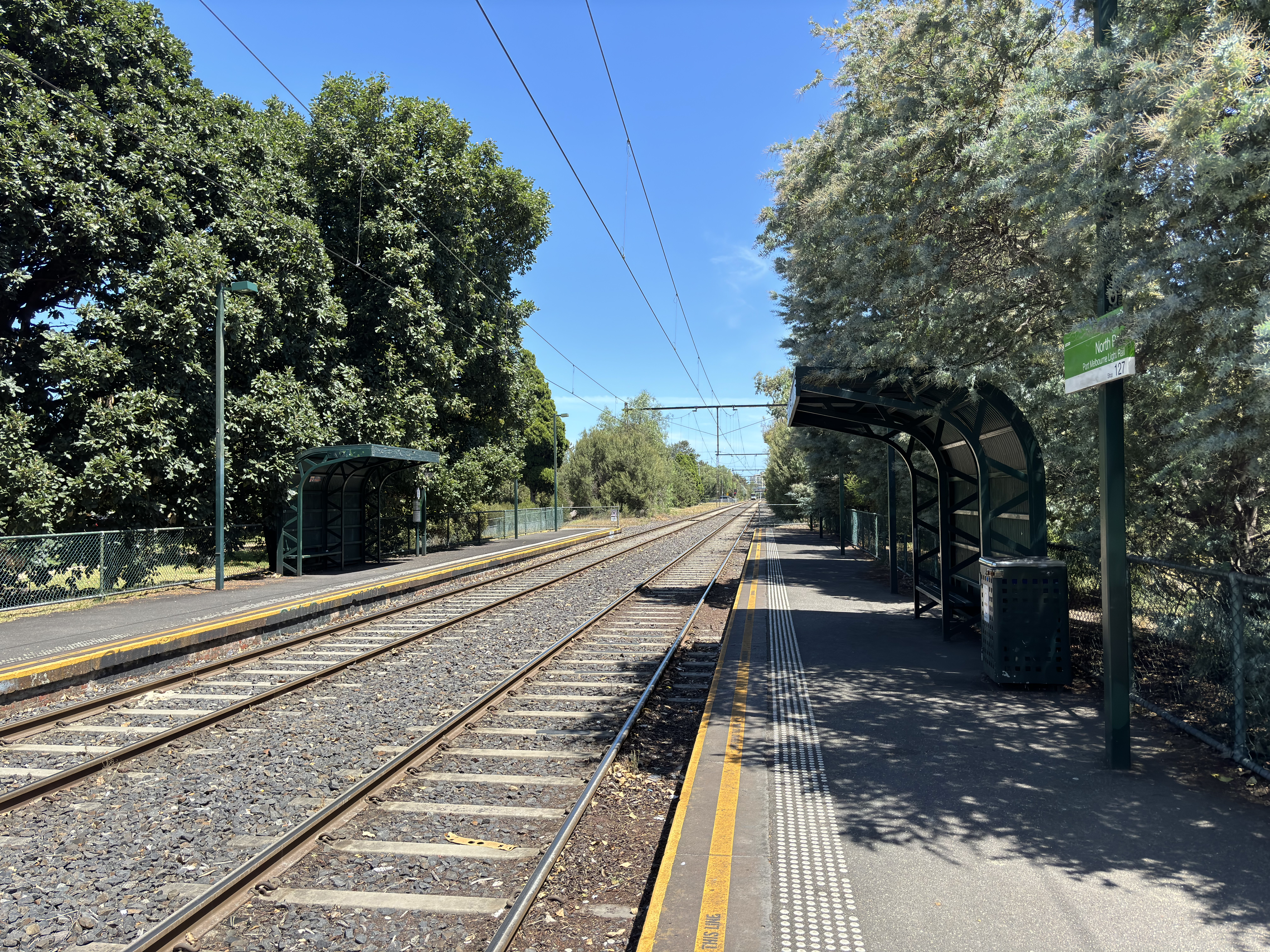
- Southbound view from city-bound platform in 2024

General information
- Location: Port Melbourne, Victoria 3207; Australia
- Coordinates: 37°50′0″S 144°56′36″E
- System: PTV tram stop
- Owner: VicTrack
- Operator: Yarra Trams
- Line: Port Melbourne
- Platforms: 2 (2 side)
- Tracks: 2

Construction
- Structure type: At grade
- Accessible: Yes―step free access

Other information
- Status: Operational
- Station code: 127; NPO (former)
- Fare zone: Myki Zone 1

History
- Opened: 2 February 1859
- Closed: 11 October 1987
- Rebuilt: 18 December 1987
- Electrified: 600 V DC overhead
- Former names: Raglan Street; North Sandridge; Port Melbourne North; North Port railway station

Services
Preceding station	Yarra Trams	Following station
Montague Street towards Box Hill	Route 109	Graham Street towards Port Melbourne
Former services
Preceding station	MetRail	Following station
Montague towards Flinders Street	Port Melbourne line	Graham towards Port Melbourne
Location

North Port is a light rail station and a former railway station on Port Melbourne railway line, first significant railway in Melbourne, Australia. The station is located in the inner Melbourne suburb of Port Melbourne, Victoria, Australia. Though it was closed in 1987 for conversion to light rail, Melbourne tram route 109 now runs through the station with newly built low-floor platforms. The station was located to the south of Raglan Street and between Evans Street and Station Street.

== History ==
North Port station opened in 1859 as Raglan Street, as an infill station 5 years after the line to Port Melbourne was opened. Throughout its history, the station has been renamed several times: North Sandridge in 1867, Port Melbourne North in 1886, and finally North Port in 1902. The station mainly served many of the factories in the area, where workers utilise the station for daily commutes from the city. The station had two sets of interlocked gates at Inglis street and Bridge Street level crossings, controlled by their respective signal boxes.

The last passenger train ran through the station on 10 October 1987, after it was announced that the line would be converted to light rail. Goods trains had continued to run through the station to Port Melbourne until at least September of that year. The replacement light rail line was officially opened on 18 December 1987. However, the station buildings has since been demolished to make way for its new low-floor platforms.

== Tram services ==
Yarra Trams operates one route via North Port station:

- : Box Hill – Port Melbourne
