= Graham Street light rail station =

Light rail station in Melbourne, Victoria

Graham Street
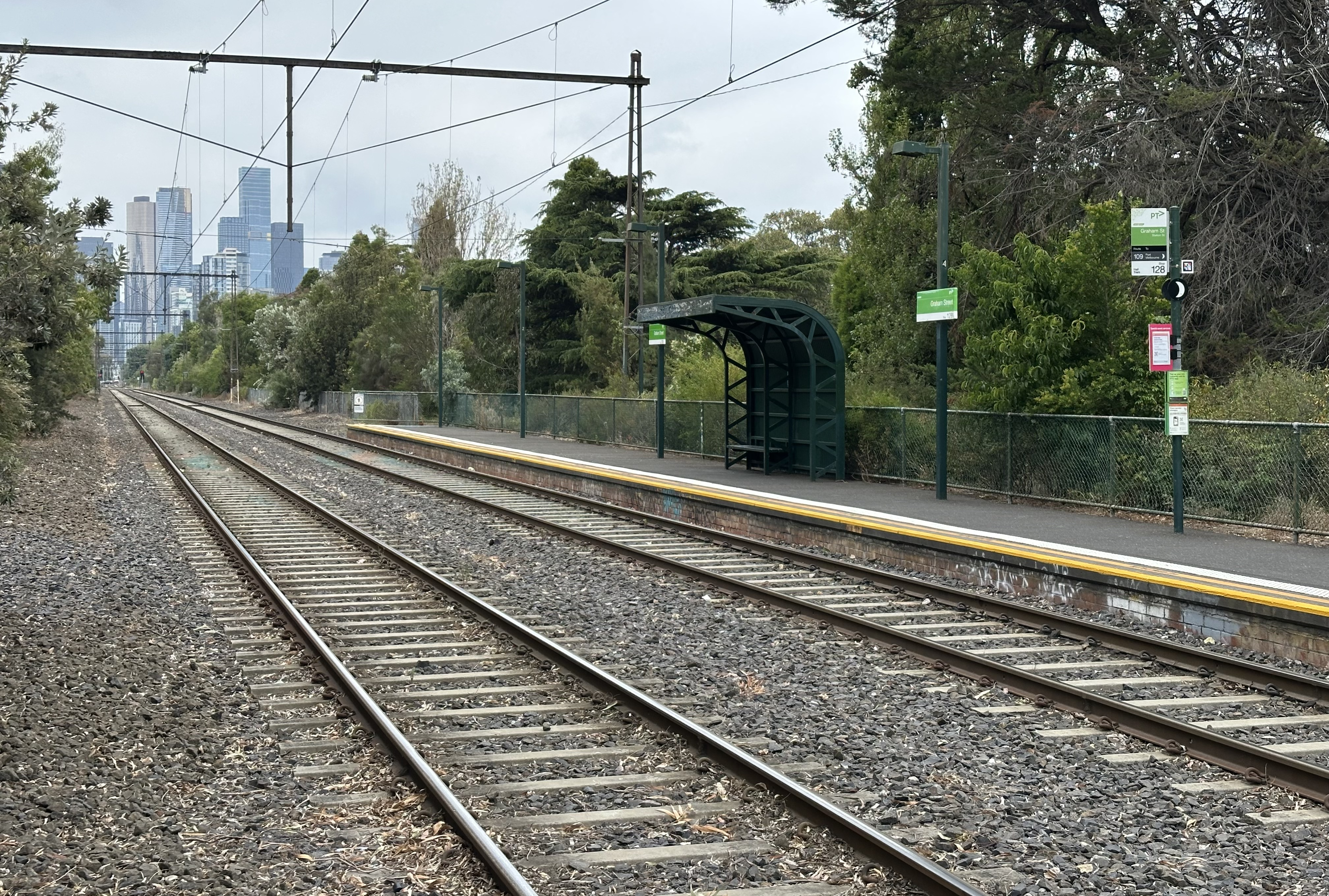
- Graham Street light rail station in 2026

General information
- Location: Port Melbourne, Victoria 3207; Australia
- Coordinates: 37°50′13″S 144°56′15″E
- System: PTV tram stop
- Owner: VicTrack
- Operator: Yarra Trams
- Line: Port Melbourne
- Platforms: 2 side
- Tracks: 2

Construction
- Structure type: At grade
- Accessible: Yes

Other information
- Status: Operational
- Station code: 128; GRA (former)
- Fare zone: Myki Zone 1

History
- Opened: 1 June 1888
- Closed: 11 October 1987
- Rebuilt: 18 December 1987
- Electrified: 600 V DC overhead
- Former names: Graham railway station

Services
Preceding station	Yarra Trams	Following station
North Port towards Box Hill	Route 109	Beacon Cove Terminus
Former services
Preceding station	MetRail	Following station
North Port towards Flinders Street	Port Melbourne line	Port Melbourne Terminus
Former pier service
Preceding station	Disused railways	Following station
Junction	Princes Pier branch	Princes Pier
	List of closed railway stations in Melbourne	
Location

Graham Street is a light rail stop and former railway station in the inner Melbourne suburb of Port Melbourne. Located to the north of Graham Street, between Evans Street and Station Street, it is served by route 109 trams, which stop at a pair of low-level platforms. It was previously part of the Port Melbourne railway line.

== History ==
The line through the station opened in 1854, and the station itself opened in 1888 as Graham Street, with the name simplified to Graham in 1909. The station was originally a pair of side platforms on a double track railway, and was set in the middle of a landscaped reserve 100 yards (91 m) wide, running between Boundary and Graham Streets, a remnant of a short-lived parliamentary provision that railway reservations should be 100 yards in width.

In 1914, with the opening of the New Pier (later Princes Pier) to the north of the existing Station Pier (formerly named Railway Pier), Graham became a junction, with a new line diverging from the up end of the station to serve the New Pier. There were two sets of interlocked gates at the Graham Street level crossing, controlled by a signal box on the western side, as well as a number of goods sidings at the up end. The Bridge Street level crossing also had its own signal box.

By the 1960s, traffic to the port had dropped due to changes in cargo handling arrangements. In 1961, the branch to Princes Pier was reduced to a single track and worked as a siding, rather than a main line. Further rationalisations were made in December 1969, when the line from Graham to Port Melbourne was singled, with the up track lifted, and the up platform taken out of service. The signal box was also closed and replaced by a signal panel in a new station building, located on the down platform.

The Bridge Street level crossing was provided with boom barriers in 1961, with the signal box abolished soon after. The Graham Street level crossing, at the down end of the station, had been abolished by October 1970, after the grade separation of the level crossing was carried out. Only two lanes of the four lane road were built initially, with the other two completed in the next year.

In January 1983, the proposal was announced that the line would be converted to light rail. The last passenger train ran through the station on 10 October 1987. Goods trains had continued to run through the station to Port Melbourne until at least September of that year. The station building was demolished in November 1987, with the replacement light rail line was officially opened on 18 December 1987.

== Tram services ==
Yarra Trams operates one route via Graham Street station:

- : Box Hill – Port Melbourne
