= North Port station =

North Port station may refer to:

- North Port light rail station, a light rail station in Melbourne, Australia previously served by the Port Melbourne rail line, now 109 tram
- Pier 4 station, proposed Manila Light Rail Transit (LRT) station previously proposed to be named North Port station
