= Princes Pier =

Historic pier on Port Phillip, Melbourne, Australia

Coordinates: 37°50′33″S 144°55′35″E

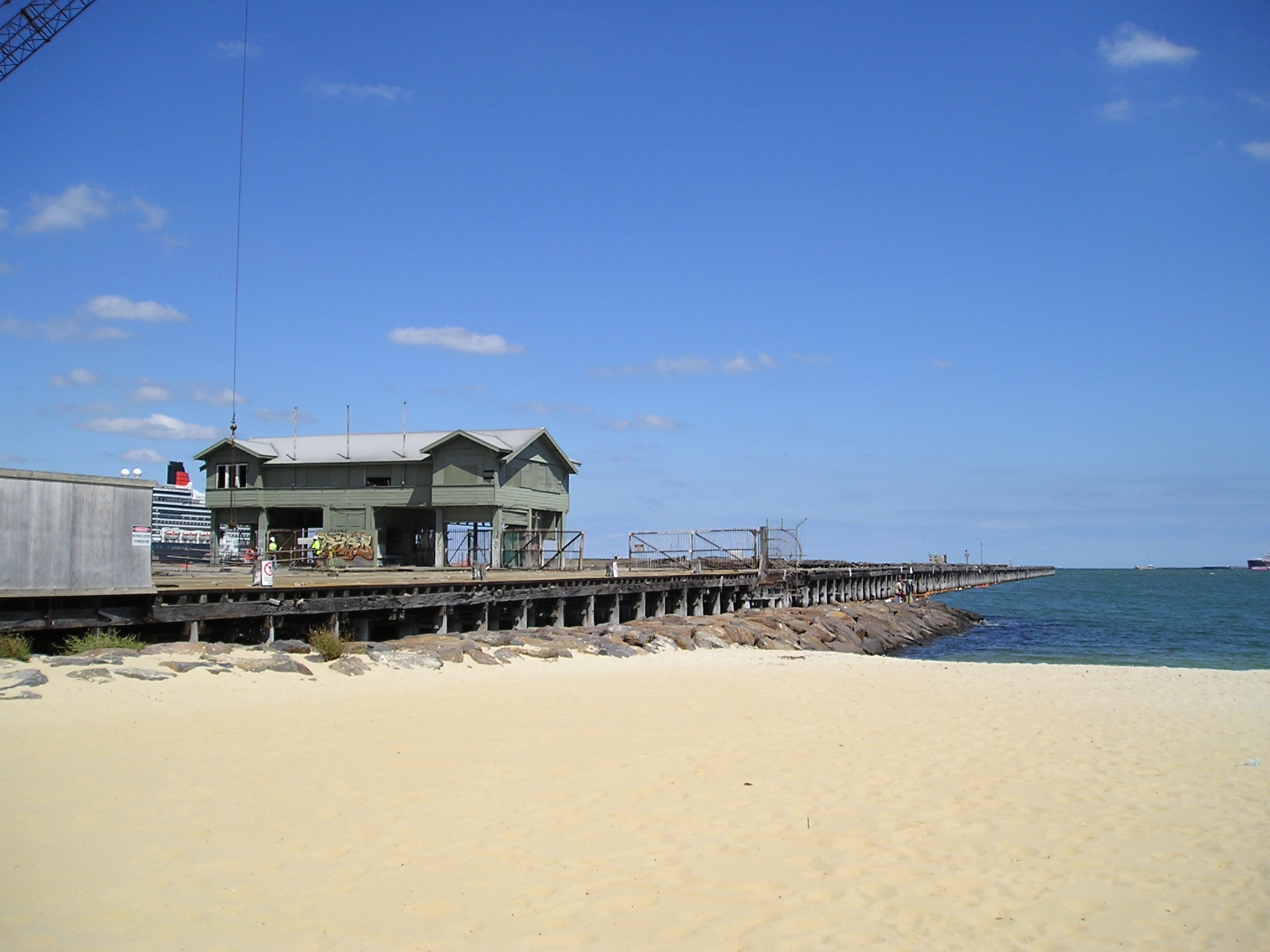
Northern side of Princes Pier, 2008

Princes Pier is a 580 metre long historic pier on Port Phillip, in Port Melbourne, Victoria, Australia. It was known as the New Railway Pier until renamed Prince's Pier after the Prince of Wales (later Edward VIII) who visited Melbourne in May 1920.

== History ==
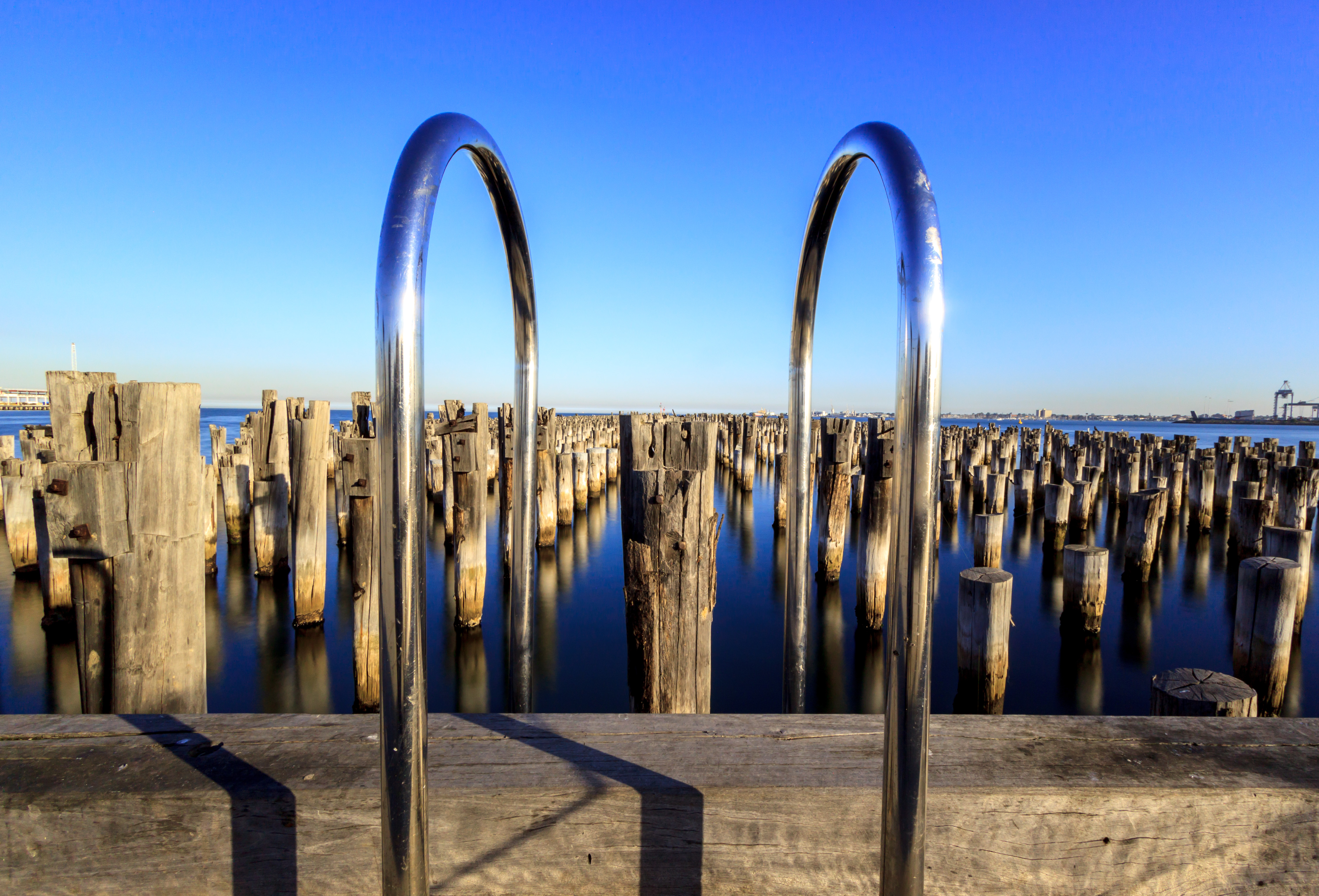
Remains of the original wooden piles forming the pier, 2017

The pier was constructed between 1912 and 1915 by the Melbourne Harbor Trust to supplement the adjacent Station Pier (originally the 'Railway Pier'). From completion in 1915 until 1969 it was also a major arrival point for new migrants, particularly during the post-war period. In addition to a pier, there was a gatehouse and barriers, terminal building, amenities rooms, goods lockers, ablution blocks, railway sidings and passenger gangways.

From opening the pier was linked by rail to the Port Melbourne railway line, via double lines branching from the Melbourne side of Graham station. Eight railway tracks ran onto the bridge, four along either face. A passenger rail service was provided to the pier after 30 May 1921 operated by suburban electric trains. Running when ships were docked at the pier, it was usually operated by a single double ended 'swing door' motor car until the Victorian Railways ended the service ended in November 1930, because it was not financially rewarding. The overhead wiring was removed on 17 August 1953, and the line singled and worked as a siding from 21 March 1961.

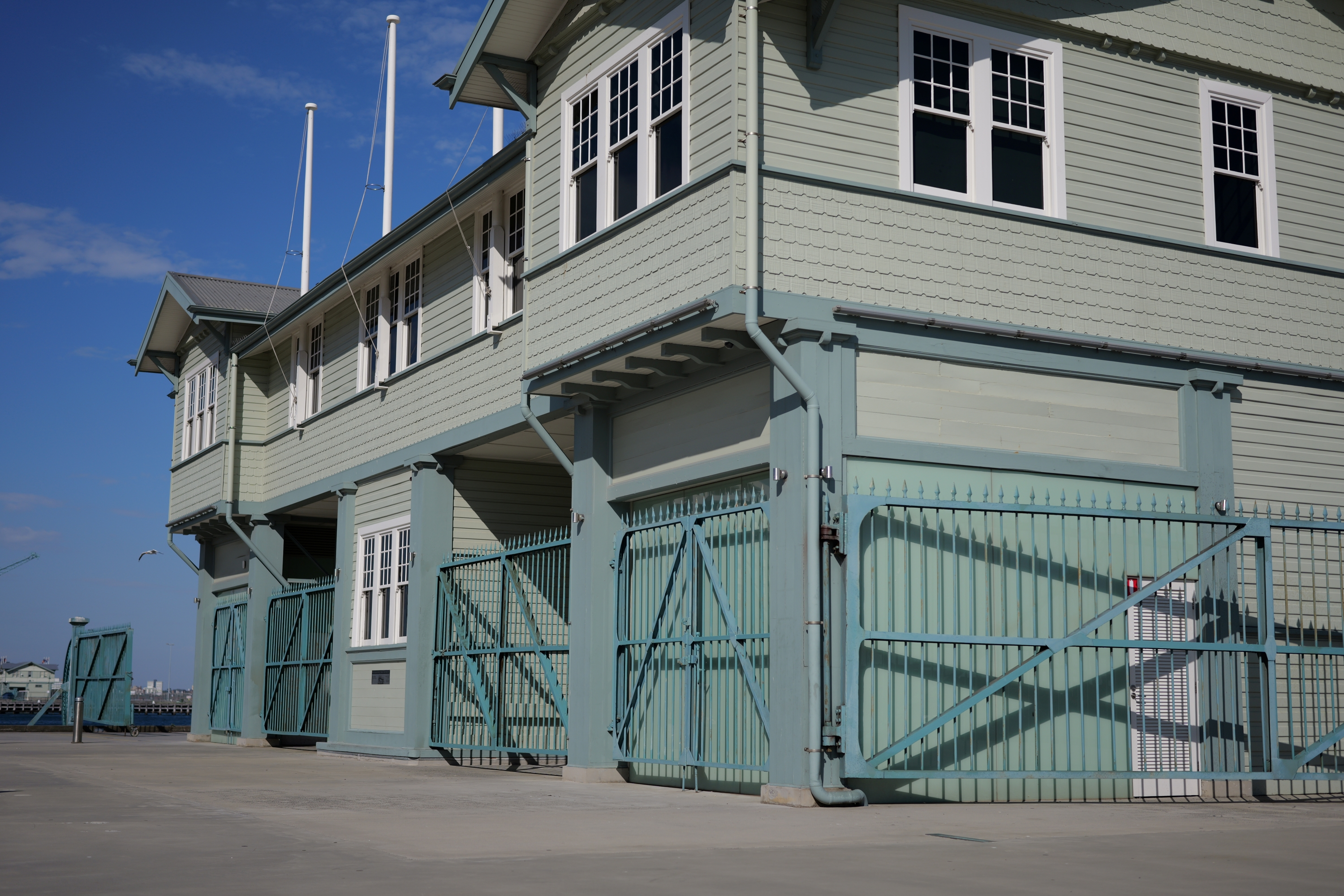
Refurbished Princes Pier building, 2025

Following the widespread adoption of containerised freight transport after the 1960s, the pier became unused, and was closed to public access in the early 1990s due to the poor timber condition. Squatters caused a fire in the late 1990s that destroyed the store structures. In the three years to 2004, 14 fires occurred.

A refurbishment, estimated to cost $14 million, was announced by the State Government in April 2006, with the first 196 metres of the pier to be fully restored. Beyond that point, the decking was removed and the original pylons preserved. A full restoration was estimated to cost $60 million. A contract for the work was awarded in June 2007, and work began in October of the same year. The refurbished section of the pier reopened to the public in December 2011.

Preceding station	Disused railways	Following station
Graham	Port Melbourne line, Princes Pier branch	Terminus
	List of closed railway stations in Melbourne	
