= Beacon Cove light rail station =

Light rail station in Melbourne, Victoria

Beacon Cove
- View from the light rail station platform, 2026

General information
- Location: Port Melbourne, Victoria 3207; Australia
- Coordinates: 37°50′27″S 144°55′59″E
- System: PTV tram stop
- Owner: VicTrack
- Operator: Yarra Trams
- Line: Port Melbourne
- Platforms: 1
- Tracks: 1

Construction
- Structure type: At grade
- Accessible: Yes

Other information
- Status: Operational, used by route 109
- Station code: 129; PTM (former)
- Fare zone: Myki Zone 1

History
- Opened: 13 April 1854
- Closed: 11 October 1987
- Rebuilt: 18 December 1987
- Electrified: 600 V DC overhead
- Former names: Port Melbourne railway station

Services
Preceding station	Yarra Trams	Following station
Graham Street towards Box Hill	Route 109	Terminus
Former services
Preceding station	MetRail	Following station
Graham towards Flinders Street	Port Melbourne line	Terminus
Location

Beacon Cove is a light rail stop in the Melbourne suburb of Port Melbourne located just before Station Pier, north of Beach Street and to the east of Canberra Parade.

The stop is adjacent to a railway station built as the Port Melbourne terminus of the Port Melbourne Railway Line, the first line to open in Australia, in 1854. The line carried passengers arriving at Station Pier, the main passenger ship arrival point at that time, to near the corner of Flinders Street and Swanston Street in the city. The original timber station building was replaced by the current brick one in 1899. The railway line was closed in 1987 and converted to light rail the same year, currently route 109, which runs though to Box Hill. A new stop was created to the south of the station building, and the station building converted to retail use.

The station building is listed on the Victorian Heritage Register for its association with the first railway line.

== Tram services ==
Yarra Trams operates one route via Beacon Cove station:

- : Box Hill – Port Melbourne
