= Port Melbourne =

- Suburb
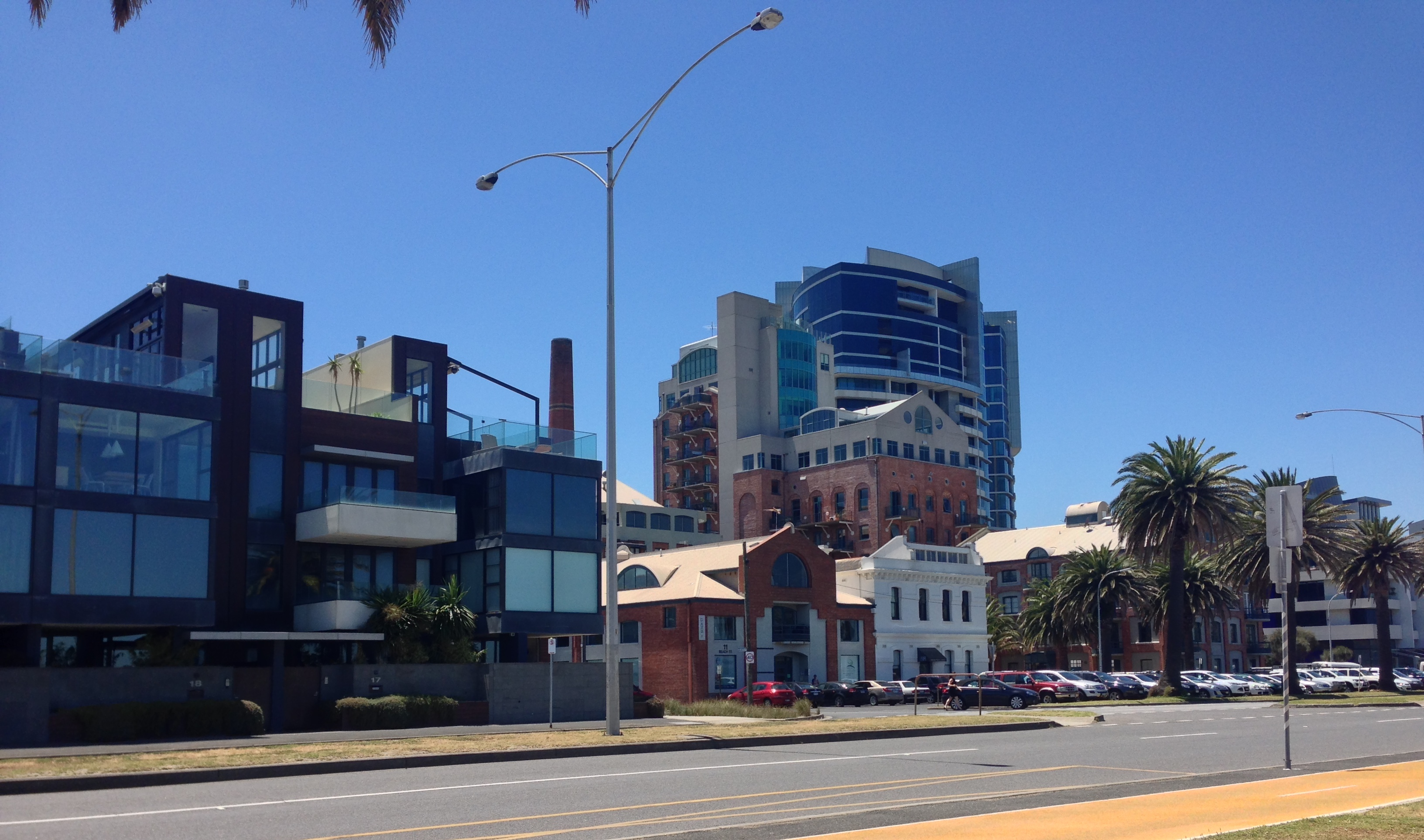
- Beach Road, Port Melbourne

- Interactive map of Port Melbourne
- Coordinates: 37°49′26″S 144°54′40″E
- Country: Australia
- State: Victoria
- City: Melbourne
- LGAs: City of Melbourne; City of Port Phillip
- Location: 3 km (1.9 mi) from Melbourne
- Established: 1860

Government
  - State electorate: Albert Park
  - Federal division: Macnamara

Area
  - Total: 9.7 km^{2} (3.7 sq mi)
- Elevation: 7 m (23 ft)

Population
  - Total: 17,633 (2021 census)
  - Density: 1,818/km^{2} (4,708/sq mi)
- Postcode: 3207
Suburbs around Port Melbourne
Yarraville	West Melbourne	Docklands
Newport	Port Melbourne	Southbank, South Melbourne
Hobsons Bay	Hobsons Bay	Albert Park, South Melbourne

Port Melbourne is an inner-city suburb in Melbourne, Victoria, Australia, 3 km (2 mi) south-west of the Melbourne central business district, located within the Cities of Melbourne and Port Phillip local government areas. Port Melbourne recorded a population of 17,633 at the 2021 census.

The area to the north of the West Gate Freeway is located within the City of Melbourne, with The area to the south located within the City of Port Phillip. The suburb is bordered by the shores of Hobsons Bay and the lower reaches of the Yarra River. Port Melbourne covers a large area, which includes the distinct localities of Fishermans Bend, Garden City and Beacon Cove.

Historically it was known as Sandridge and developed as the city's second port, linked to the nearby Melbourne CBD.

The formerly industrial Port Melbourne has been subject to intense urban renewal over the past three decades. As a result, Port Melbourne is a diverse and historic area, featuring industrial and port areas along the Yarra, to open parklands, bayside beaches, exclusive apartments and Bay Street's restaurants and cafes. The suburb also forms a major transport link from east to west, home to one end of the West Gate Bridge.

== History ==
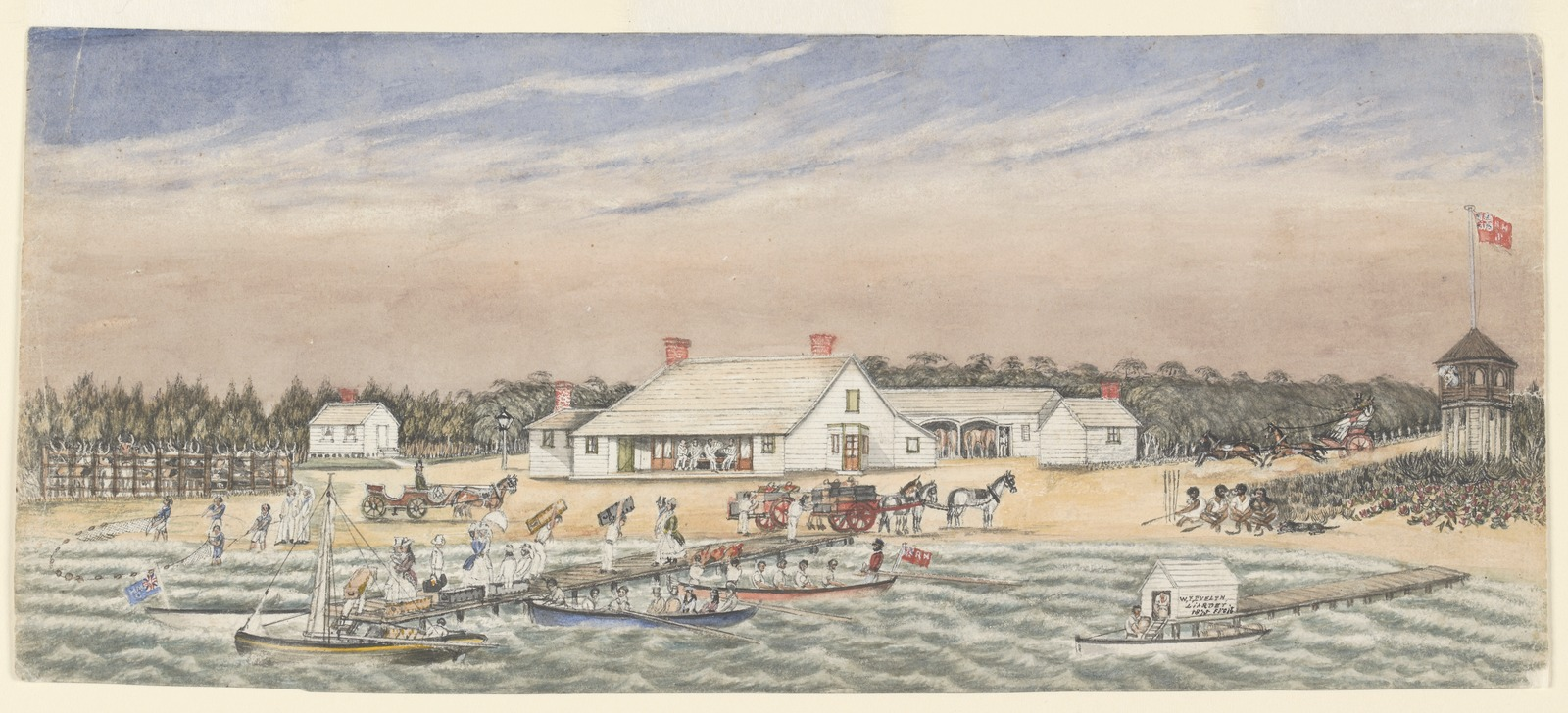
Liardet's Beach and hotel in their heyday as painted by Wilbraham Liardet. State Library Victoria pictures collection.

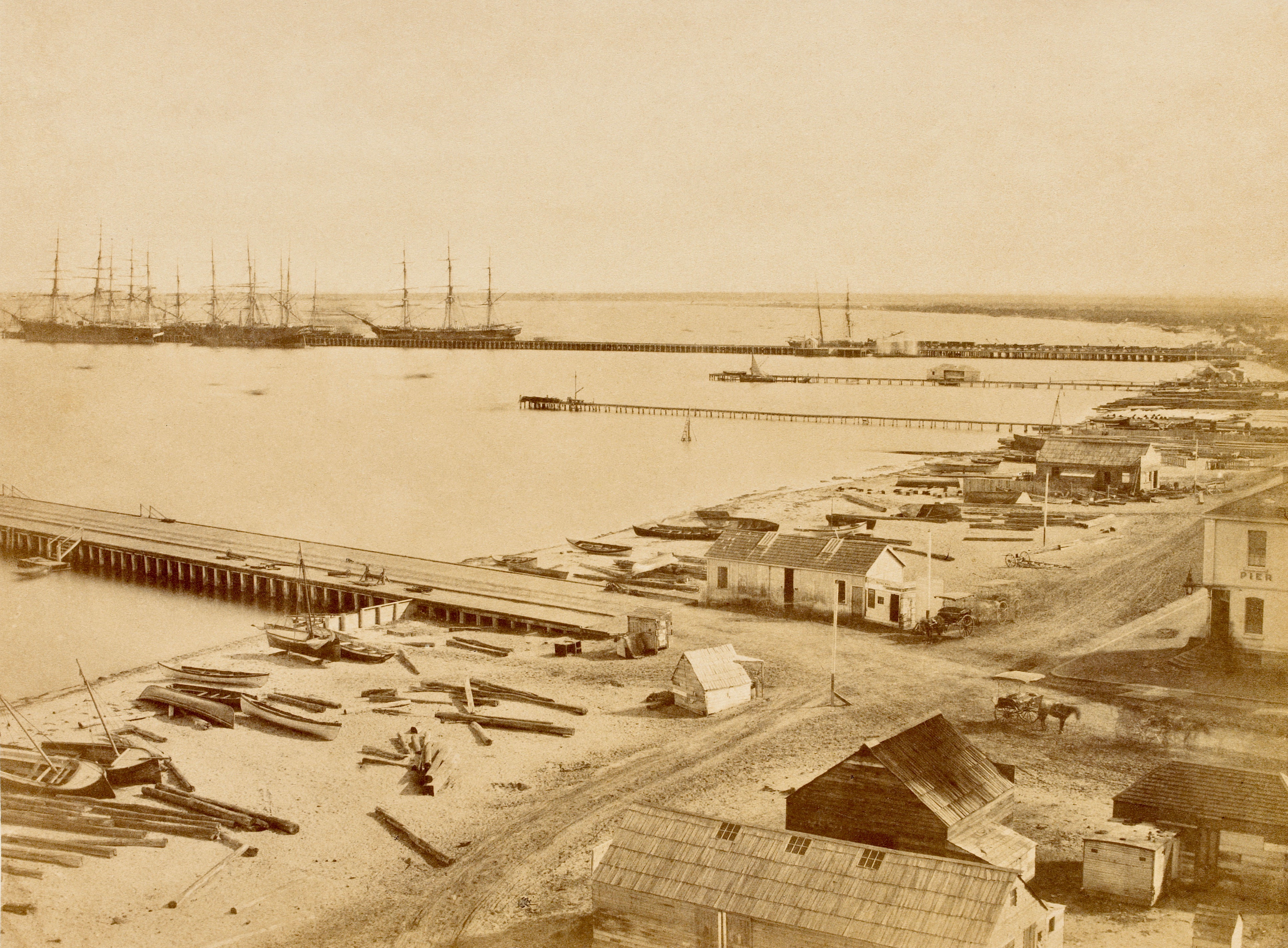
Town Pier (foreground) and Railway Pier (distance) about 1858

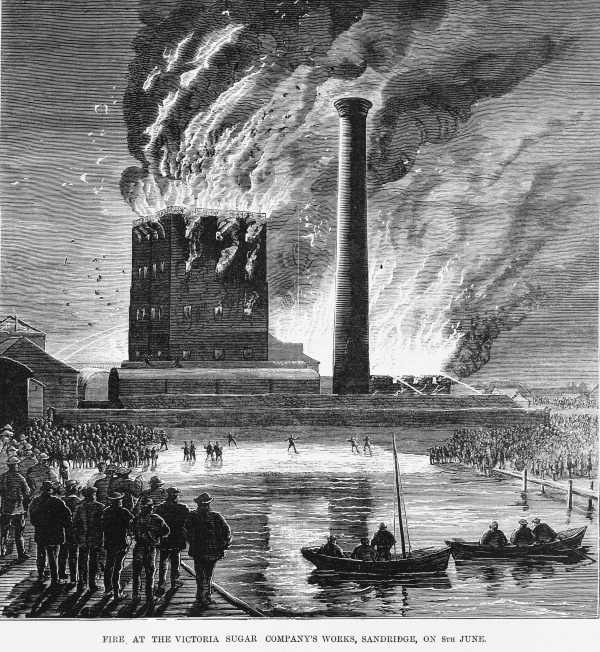
Fire at the Sandridge sugarworks in 1875

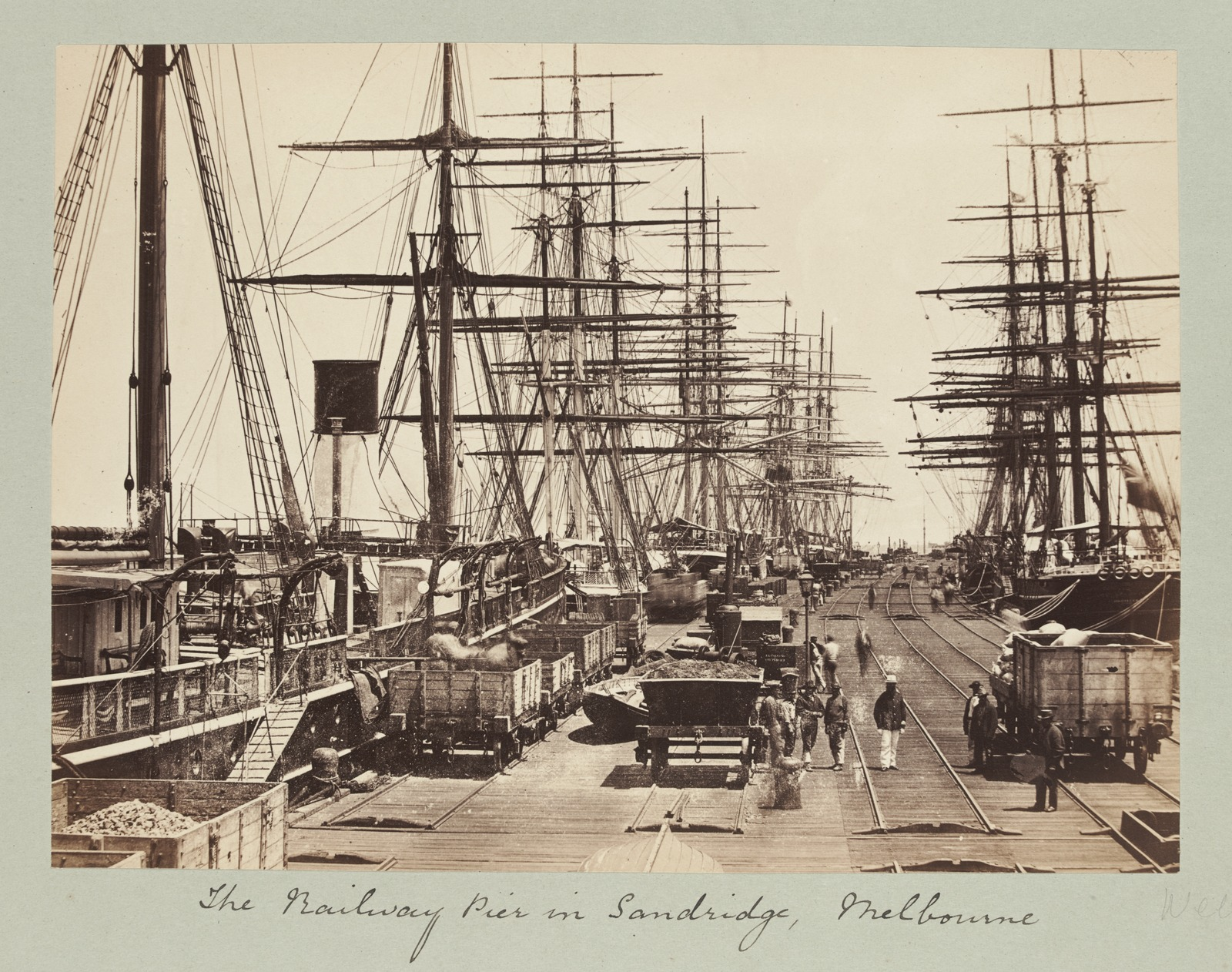
The Railway Pier in Sandridge, Melbourne State Library Victoria H29693/1

The most prominent early resident of the area now known as Port Melbourne was Captain Wilbraham Frederick Evelyn Liardet, who arrived in 1839 and established a hotel, jetty, and mail service. Liardet later stated that before his arrival the surveyor William Wedge Darke and his family had camped on the beach in their two roomed, carpeted wooden caravan known as 'Darke's Ark'. Liardet credited Wedge with cutting the first track to the beach through the tea tree scrub and hoisting a barrel on a pole, on a high section of ground, to point the way back to the Melbourne settlement. From this signpost its first official name, 'Sandridge', was said to have originated. The area also became commonly known as 'Liardet's Beach' but Liardet himself was said to have preferred 'Brighton'. It became Port Melbourne in 1884.

The area came into prominence during the Victorian gold rush of the 1850s. With an increasing number of ships looking to berth, Sandridge became a thriving transport hub. To alleviate the high costs of shipping goods via small vessels up the Yarra River to Melbourne the Port Melbourne railway line was built in 1854 to connect Sandridge to Melbourne. The disused Sandridge Bridge takes its name from this historic railway line.

In 1860, Port Melbourne was an early area of Victoria to gain Municipal status with the Sandridge Borough, which later became the City of Port Melbourne.

In the early years of Port Melbourne, the suburb was separated from neighbouring Albert Park by a large shallow lagoon. This was gradually filled in over the years, with the last of it completed in 1929. Today the area is largely covered by the eponymous Lagoon Reserve, a public park to the east of the Esplanade between Liardet Street and Graham Street, although the original extent of the lagoon was much greater.

As a transport hub, Port Melbourne had numerous hotels. Early industries included a sugar refining, soap production, candle works, chemical works, rice and flour mills, gasworks, a distillery and a boot factory. Station and Princes Piers were major places of arrival to Australia for immigrants prior to the availability of affordable air travel.

For many years Port Melbourne was a focus of Melbourne's criminal underworld, which operated smuggling syndicates on the docks. The old Ships Painters and Dockers Union was notorious for being controlled by gangsters. The Waterside Workers Federation, on the other hand, was a stronghold of the Communist Party of Australia.

With the amalgamation of the local Council into the City of Port Phillip in 1994, many of Port Melbourne's civic institutions were adaptively reused. As a result, the Port Melbourne Town Hall is now a public library.

As the importance of the Port has declined, and as manufacturing industries have moved out of the inner city area, Port Melbourne has increasingly become a residential suburb. The area where Port Melbourne originally developed, around Station Pier and Princes Pier, has been redeveloped with a mixture of apartment complexes and medium-density housing, the best known of which is the Beacon Cove development.

== Demographics ==
In the 2016 census, there were 16,175 people in Port Melbourne. 63.2% of people were born in Australia. The next most common countries of birth were England 5.4%, New Zealand 2.6%, Greece 2.0%, United States of America 1.0% and Italy 1.0%. 72.3% of people spoke only English at home. Other languages spoken at home included Greek 4.8%, Italian 1.7%, Mandarin 1.3%, French 0.8% and Russian 0.8%. The most common responses for religion were No Religion 38.3% and Catholic 21.8%.

== Transport ==
=== Road ===
Two major freeways run through Port Melbourne; the West Gate Freeway, which runs east–west from the West Gate Bridge and CityLink, which runs north toward the Bolte Bridge. Other main roads include Bay Street, Williamstown Road, Lorimer Street (which runs along the Yarra River), Graham Street, Salmon Street, Ingles Street and Beach Street (which runs toward Beaconsfield Parade and St Kilda). Port Melbourne's roads are a mix of planning styles and as a result can be difficult to navigate.

Port Melbourne is serviced by an extensive bus network operated by CDC Melbourne which connects it to Melbourne CBD and surrounding suburbs.

=== Rail ===
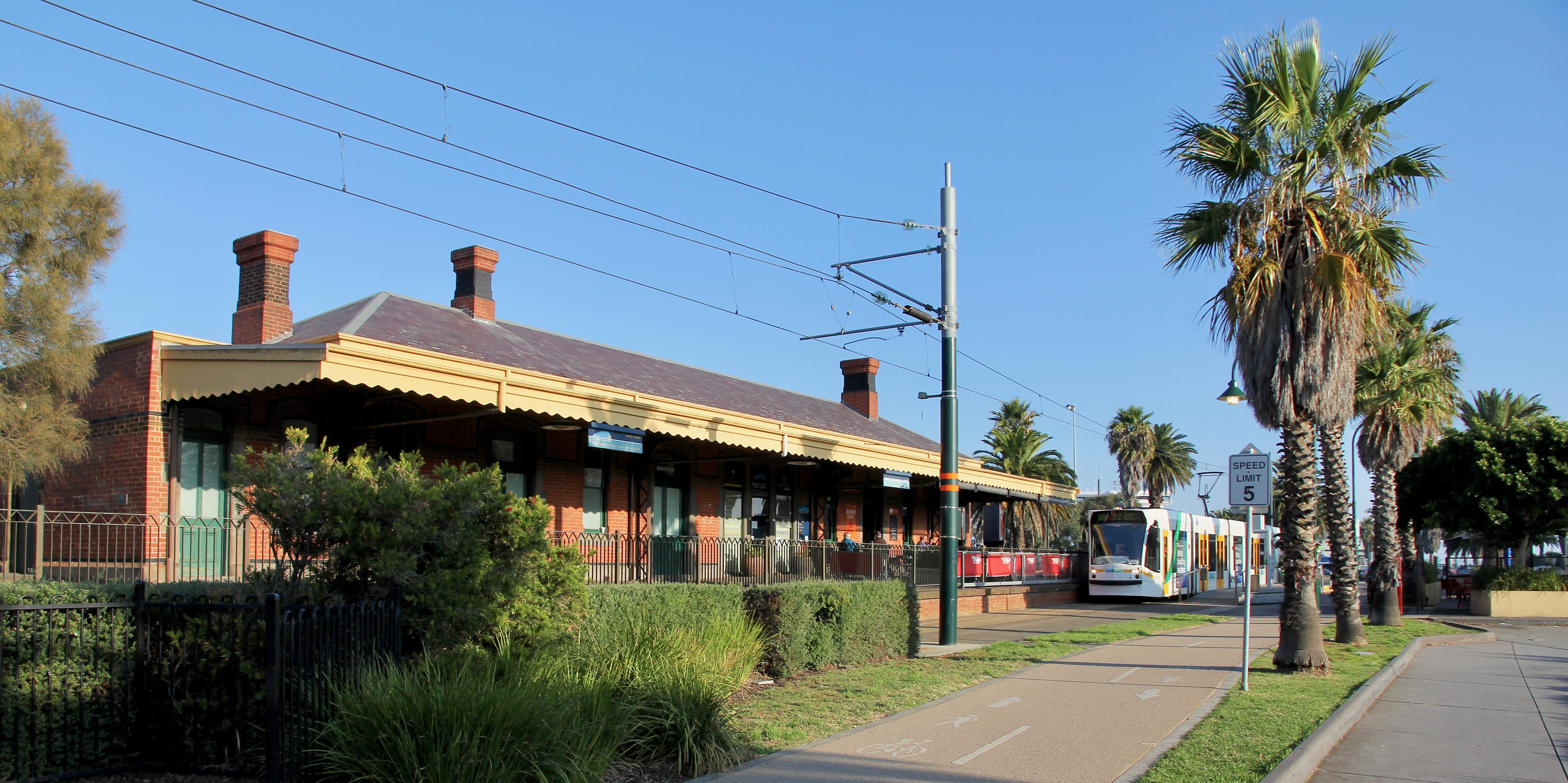
The former Port Melbourne railway station is now the terminus for the light rail line

Port Melbourne is serviced by Melbourne tram route 109, which has been run as a high patronage high frequency light rail service since the heavy rail line was converted to light rail in 1987. While there are several disused freight rail links, the light rail is the only used rail connection to Port Melbourne. There have been a number of proposals for tram and light rail extension in Port Melbourne.

Proposed Beaconsfield Parade St Kilda-Port Melbourne route

St Kilda-Port Melbourne link

A five kilometre tram link between St Kilda and Port Melbourne along Beaconsfield Parade was first raised by the City of Port Phillip in 2005. The City of Port Phillip's 2007 feasibility study into the route found that the high density population could sustain around 200,000 annual commuter trips and that the link would be financially viable if tourists were charged $6 per one-way trip.

To address residents concerns over possible loss of beachfront views, the Council investigated the possibility of a new high-tech line, involving wire-free operation. Critics argued that it would be duplicating the route 12 tram route, with the two routes running in parallel just 200 metres apart for about 2 kilometres along Beaconsfield Parade. However, a direct tram journey between St Kilda and Port Melbourne is not possible and currently requires a change of routes at Southbank, which is a 10-kilometre round trip.

=== Port ===
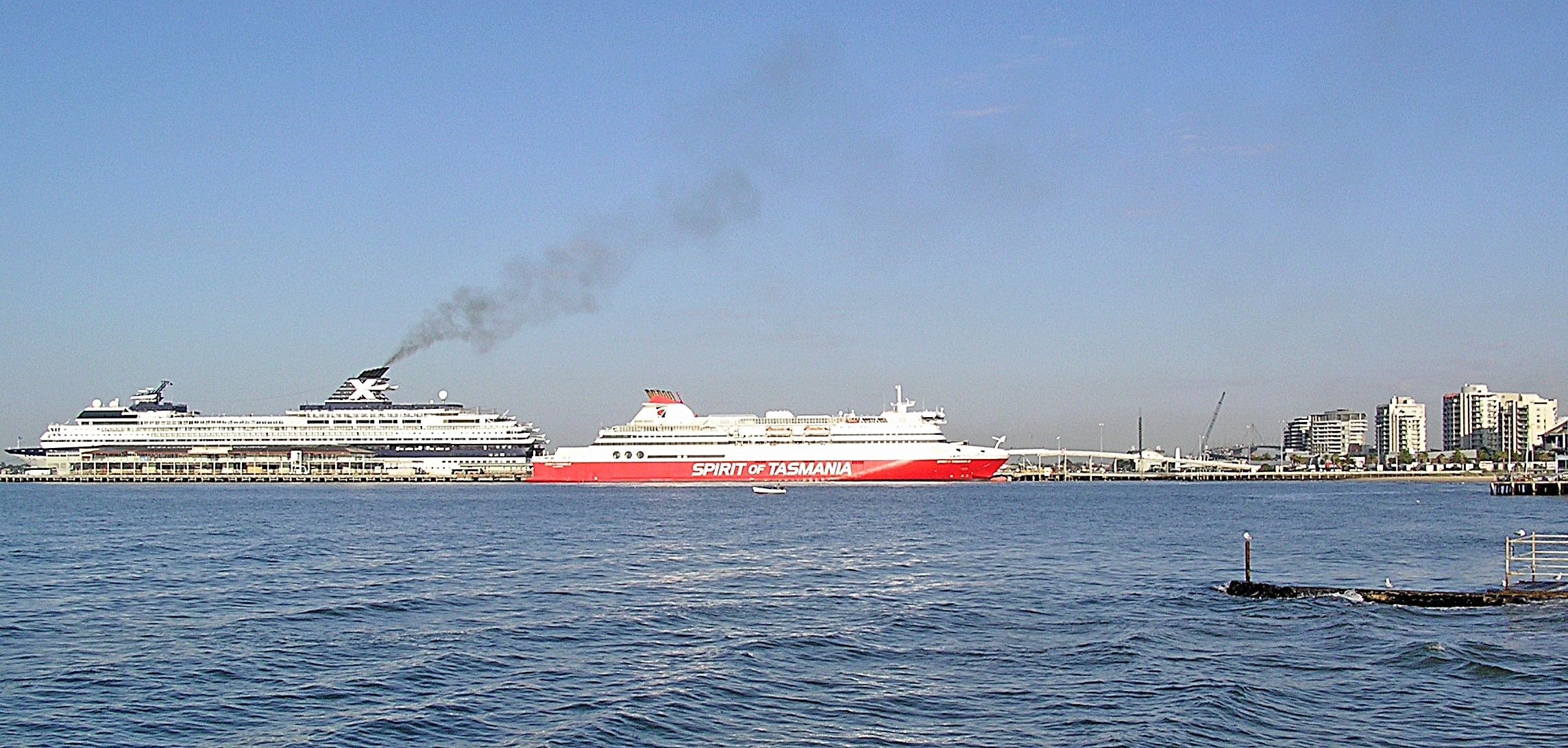
Port Melbourne and passenger ships as seen from Middle Park

Today, Port Melbourne still serves as a transport hub for passenger and cargo vessels. Many luxury liners, naval vessels and ferries arrive at Station Pier. Cargo traffic takes place further west, near the mouth of the Yarra River, principally at Webb Dock.

== Housing ==
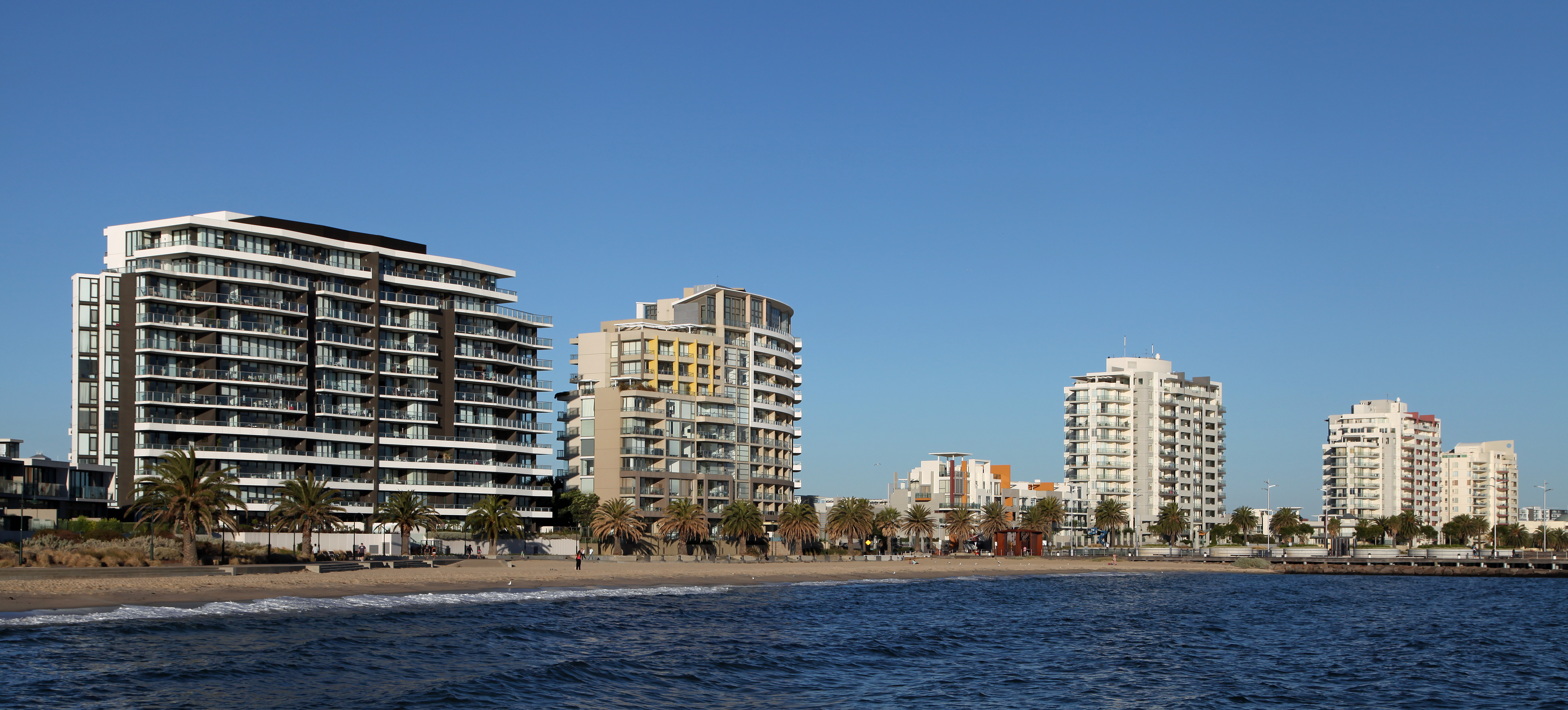
Higher density development at Beacon Cove Beach

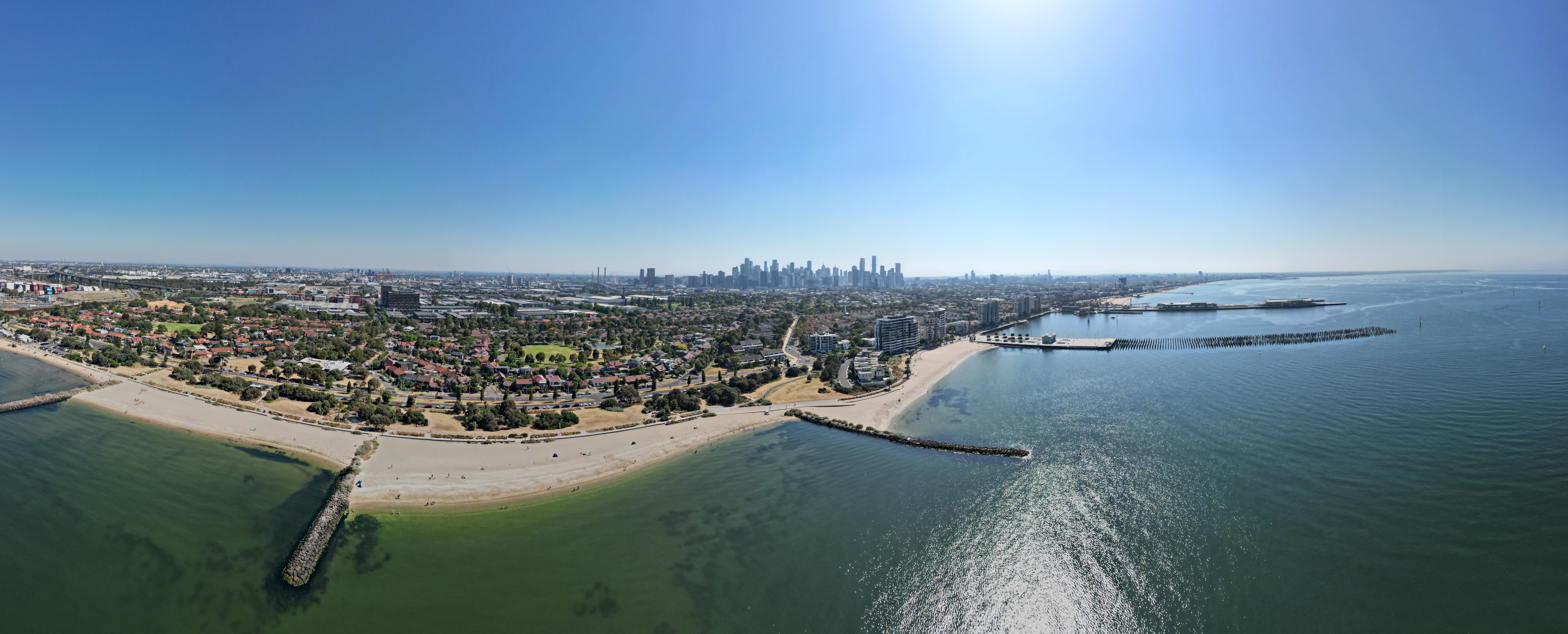
Aerial panorama of Port Melbourne

Houses in Port Melbourne range from single-fronted Victorian timber worker's cottages to new apartments and housing developments. Port Melbourne has undergone a major demographic shift in the past twenty years, from one of the cheapest and poorest suburbs in the city to one of the most expensive and wealthiest. Many large apartment developments in Port Melbourne occupy large blocks of land, taking over large factories and warehouses, such as HM@S project in Beach Street, ID Apartments in Pickles and Rouse Streets, and Bayshore and Bayview Apartments in Bay Street. Each of these developments comprise multiple buildings, and many of the redevelopments have preserved the heritage buildings. The Port Melbourne population now combines significant numbers of wealthy people, with those who live in public housing and other "old Port" locales. The area has many residents whose families came from Greece in the 1940s and 1950s, as well as more recent arrivals from Africa and Asia.

== Commerce ==
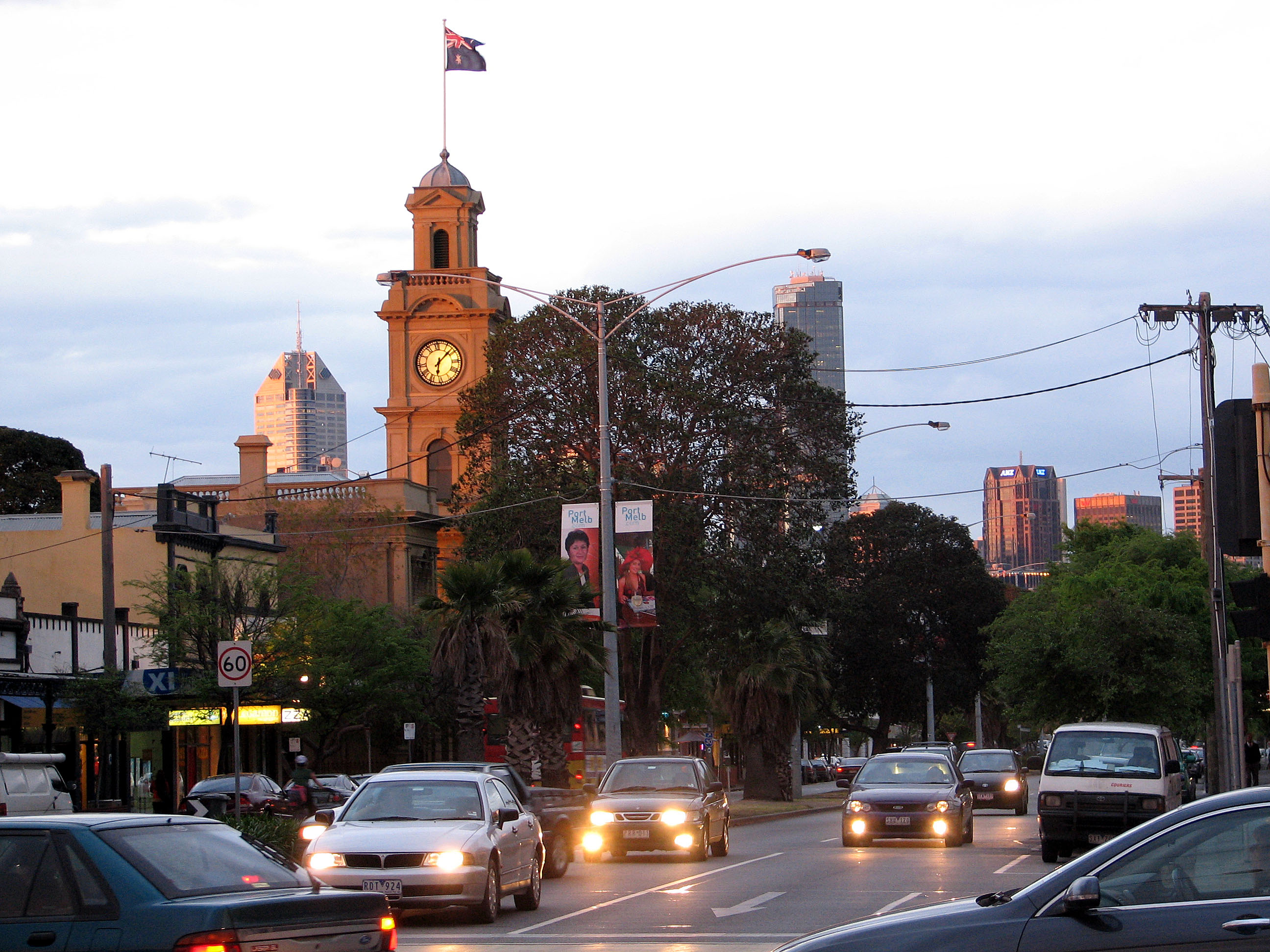
Bay Street in September 2007

Bay Street is Port Melbourne's main and historic commercial area.

Toyota Australia's Head Office is in Port Melbourne.

The Maritime Union of Australia maintains a strong presence in the area.

== Sport ==
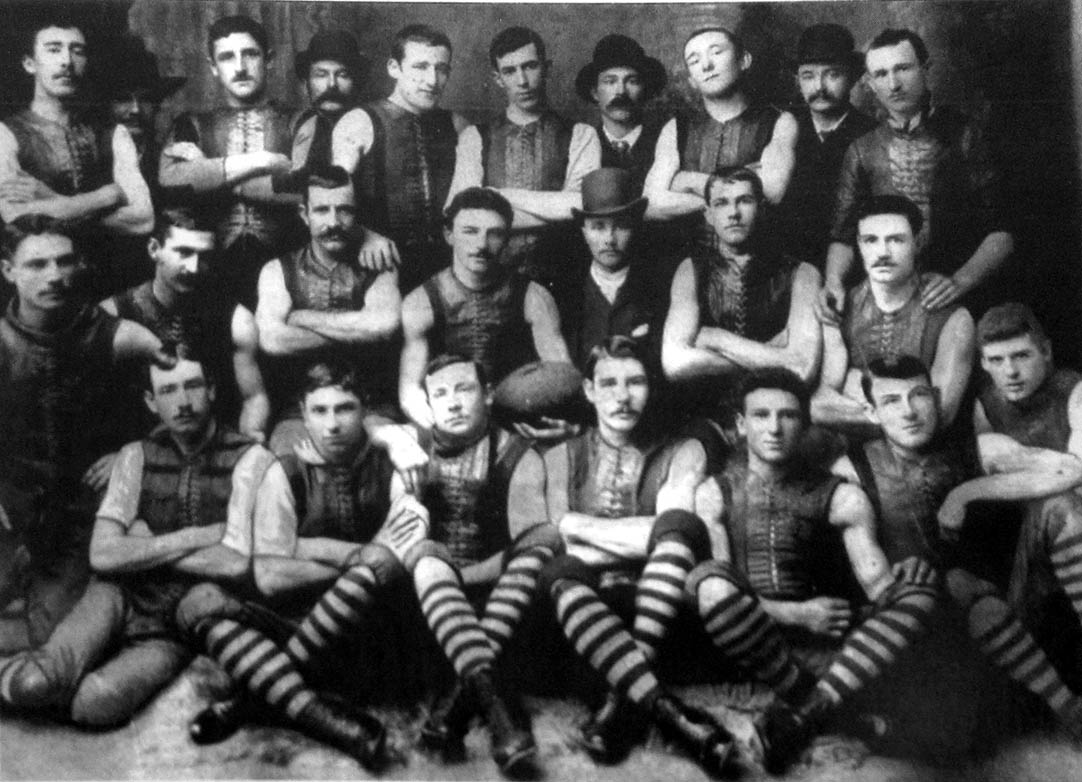
Port Melbourne football club team, 1889

=== Australian rules football ===
The Port Melbourne Football Club, known as "the Borough" is one of Melbourne's oldest Australian rules football sides, and plays in the Victorian Football League. The club's home games are played at North Port Oval. Another local team is the Port Melbourne Colts Football Club which plays in the Southern Football Netball League.

=== Cricket ===
The Port Melbourne Cricket Club founded in 1874, is one of the oldest sporting clubs in Australia, and one of the twelve founding cricket clubs of the Melbourne District Cricket competition. Known as "the Borough", the club's long and proud history includes 2 Victorian Sub-District Cricket Association Championship Titles and 29 Premierships (including 10 in the 1st Grade). The club fields 5 senior teams across a number of grades and 10 junior teams in under 12's, under 14's and under 16's, as well as T20 Blast and the Milo in2CRICKET Program. The five senior sides now play in the Southern Bayside Cricket Competition administered by Cricket Victoria and the club plays its home games at North Port Oval.

=== Association football (soccer) ===
Port Melbourne is represented by the Port Melbourne Sharks, an association football team, which has produced names such as Daniel Allsopp and Rodrigo Vargas. The team currently competes in the National Premier Leagues Victoria (second-tier in Australia, behind the A-League). The Sharks play their home games at SS Anderson Reserve.

=== Baseball ===
The Port Melbourne “Mariners” Baseball Club established in 1929 plays in the Victoria Baseball Summer League, fielding six senior teams and four junior teams. Longstaff Field has been upgraded to include an artificial infield and competition-standard lighting, allowing the club to play night games.

=== Tennis ===
The Port Melbourne Tennis Club was established in 1885 and is located in Morris Reserve, Swallow St, Port Melbourne.

=== Shooting sport ===
The Melbourne International Shooting Club (MISC), formed in 1955 and moved to the present site in the late 1970s, is an ISSF-approved shooting complex for target pistol and small-bore rifle shooting disciplines and was the venue of choice for the 2005 Summer Deaflympics and the 2006 Commonwealth Games events, and is affiliated with several umbrella bodies including the Victorian Amateur Pistol Association (VAPA), Target Rifle Victoria (TRV) and IPSC Australia. The facility is located at Fishermans Bend north of the West Gate Freeway on Todd Road (the last exit east of the Yarra River before starting the West Gate Bridge), west of the Westgate Park and between Gate 7 of the old Holden plant and the Melbourne International Kart Raceway.

=== Kart racing ===
The Go Kart Club of Victoria (GKCV), initially based at the western suburb of Brooklyn and relocated to Fishermans Bend in 1995, is amongst the oldest of established kart racing clubs in Australia and is the oldest in Victoria. It operates the 966 m (1,056 yd) Melbourne International Kart Raceway, located at the corner of Todd Road and Cook Street north of the West Gate Freeway Today it is the largest go-kart club in Victoria and the second largest within Australia, having hosted rounds of the Australian Kart Championship and Rotax Pro Tour as well as the popular annual City of Melbourne Titles and Monthly Club Days, and once held the CIK/FIA Oceania Championships in 1997.

=== Trugo ===
There are two clubs for the indigenous casual game of trugo in Melbourne: the Port Melbourne Trugo Club and the Sandridge Trugo Club.

== Localities within Port Melbourne ==
Port Melbourne features three distinctive localities, with identities separated from the main section of the neighbourhood.

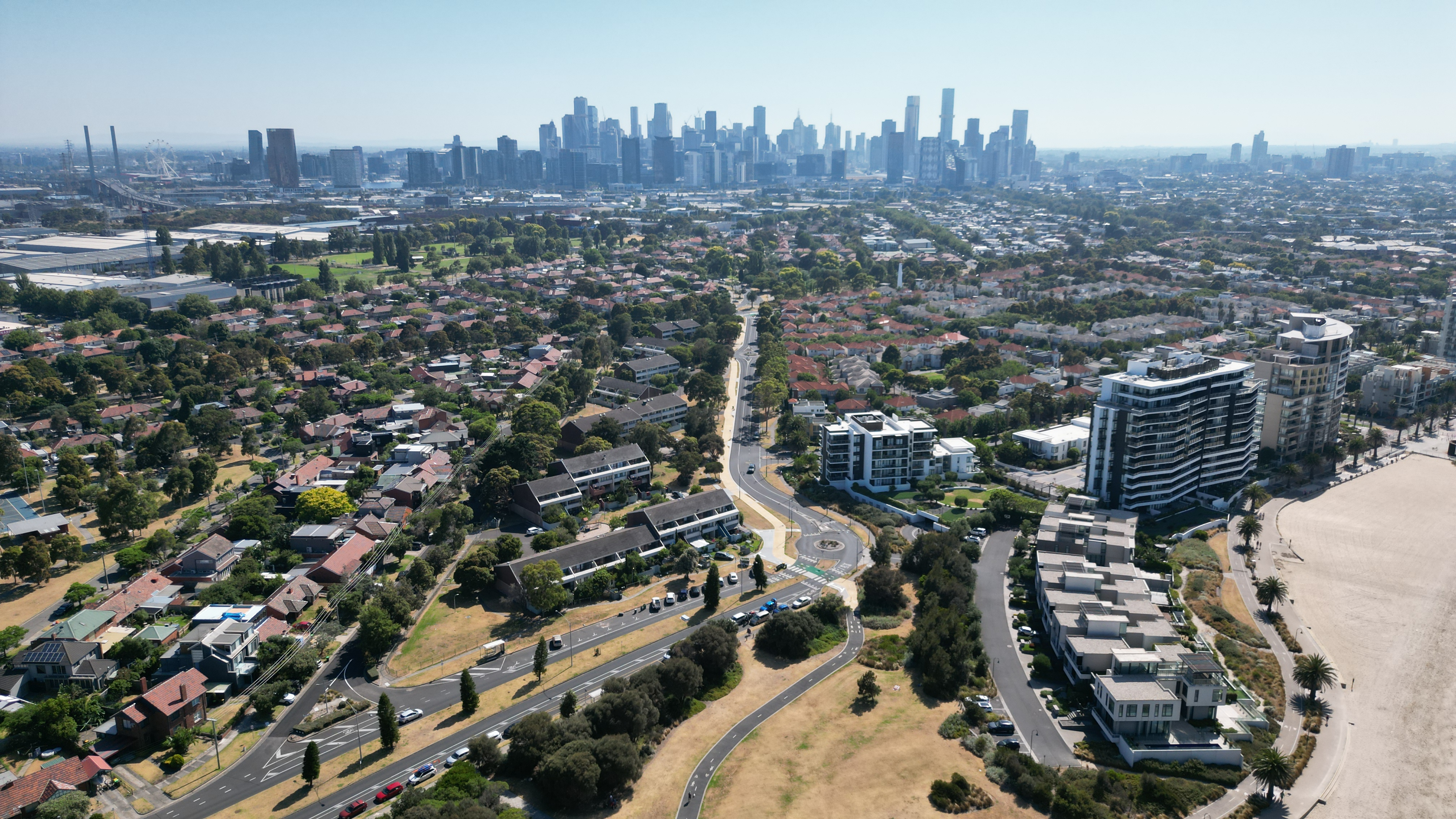
Melbourne city skyline from the perspective of Port Melbourne

=== Garden City ===
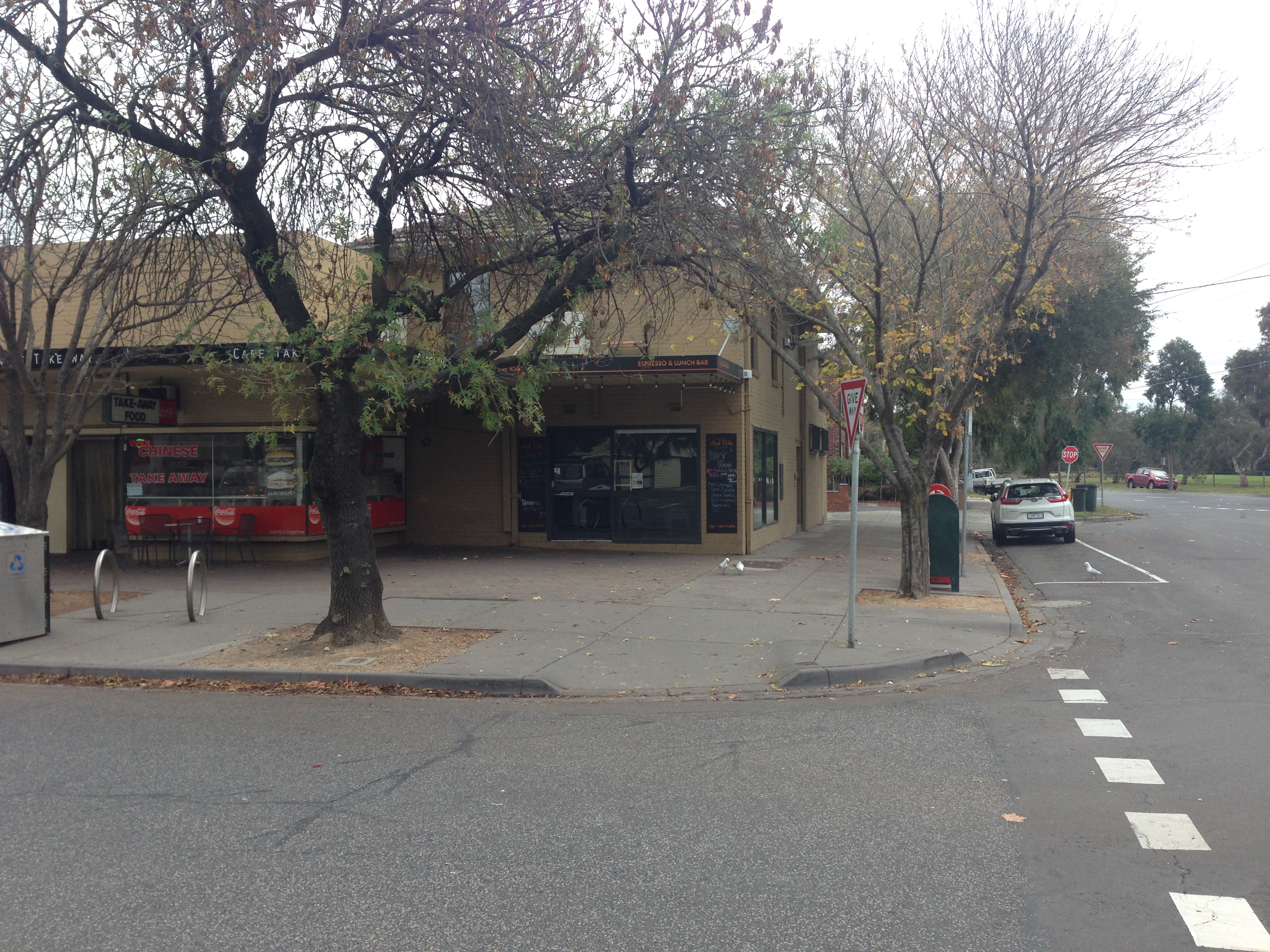
Garden City shops, Port Melbourne

Garden City is a locality within Port Melbourne and the City of Port Phillip. It started in the 1920s as a planned "garden suburb", similar to those built in Britain a few years earlier during the Garden City Movement. The early development was built as low-cost housing by the State Bank, with later additions of public housing by the Housing Commission of Victoria. It comprises semi-attached single and double-storey houses arranged around a series of public open spaces, in a distorted Beaux-Arts layout. Contrary to popular belief, the "Bank Houses" were never public housing and have always been in private hands. The "Bank Houses" area later became known as "nobs hill", a reference to relative wealth of their occupants compared to the residents of the clinker brick public housing that was added later. The Housing Commission area was known as 'Little Baghdad'.

The Garden City post office in Centre Avenue has been open since 1945. (37°50′10″S 144°55′12″E)

=== Beacon Cove ===
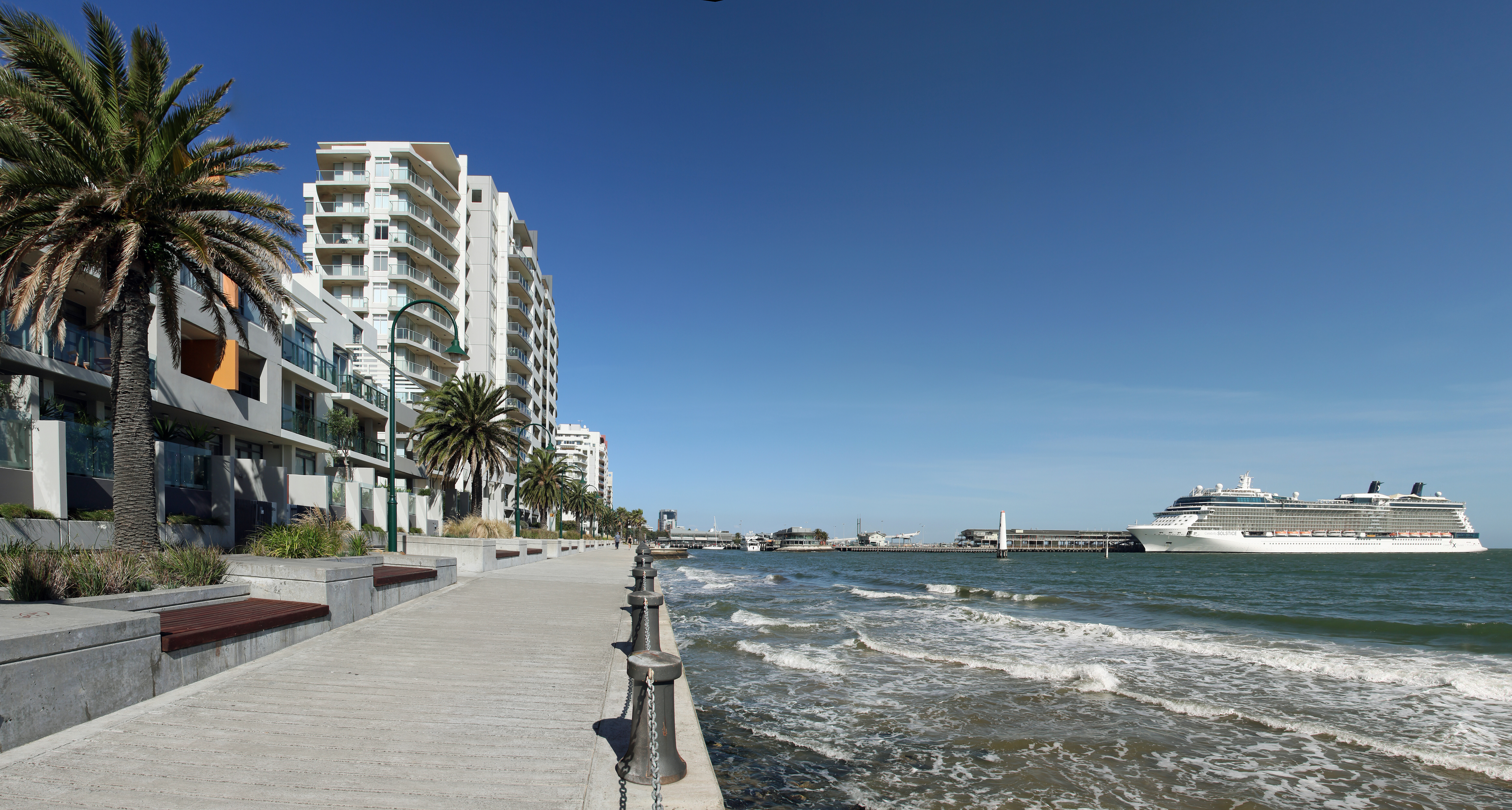
Station Pier and Beacon Cove development in Port Melbourne

Beacon Cove is a locality within Port Melbourne and the City of Port Phillip. It comprises approximately 1100 dwellings in a mixture of low-rise medium density and high-rise housing, with a small supermarket, some commercial space, a small number of cafes and restaurants and a leisure complex including a gym, swimming pool and tennis courts. It was developed over the decade from 1996 by Australian developer Mirvac, following the collapse of the "Sandridge City" scheme for a gated community featuring canalside housing. The site was formerly an industrial facility. Beacon Cove features a waterfront promenade, palm-lined boulevards and a layout that allows the retention of two operational shipping beacons. Most of the low-rise housing is arranged around a series of small parks, in a postmodern scaled-down Beaux-Arts plan, similar in layout to nearby St Vincent Gardens in Albert Park. Along the foreshore is a series of 11–14-storey high-rise apartment towers with a small amount of very upmarket low-rise housing at the western end, directly fronting Sandridge Beach. The layout re-routed Beach Street away from the foreshore and the apartments along the waterfront have direct access to the promenade. The development was completed in stages, working west from Princes Street, and this is reflected in the different styles of architecture. As of 2013 the owner of the leisure complex has proposed replacing it with a 19-storey apartment complex, and the City of Port Phillip has instead proposed rezoning the site for mixed use with a 10-storey height limit. A number of community groups oppose both proposals.

=== Fishermans Bend ===
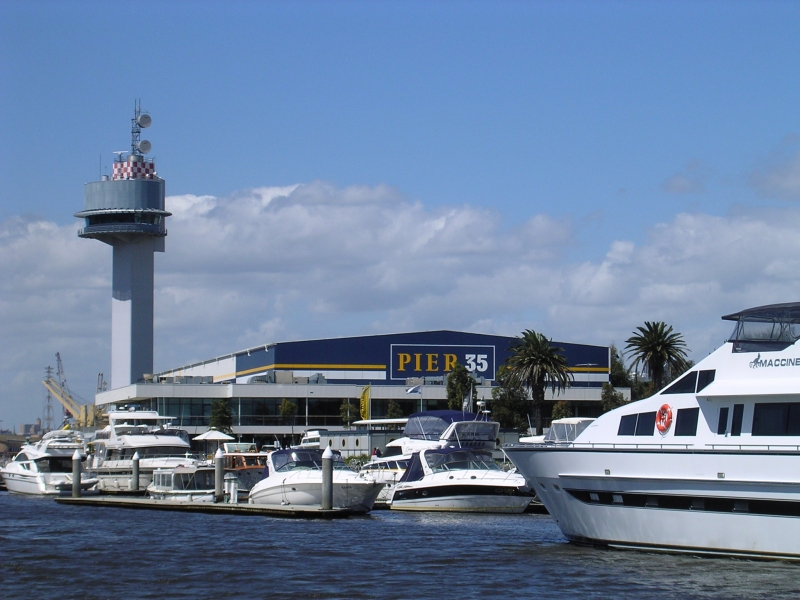
Pier 35 marina in Fishermans Bend

Fishermans Bend (formerly Fishermen's Bend) is a locality within Port Melbourne and the City of Melbourne. It is positioned immediately to the east of the West Gate Bridge, on the south bank of the Yarra River, adjacent to the suburb of Port Melbourne and opposite Coode Island, on the north shore of the Yarra River.

Fishermans Bend originally included the area now known as Garden City, which was renamed in 1929.

From the 1850s, the site was a location for Bay fishermen of European descent. Some thirty families lived on the Bend, frequently finding additional work in the docks and cargo ships; ballast was loaded onto ships returning to Europe. Habitation was in rough shacks along the Bend, made from corrugated iron, flattened kerosene tins or wood. There were no roads, shops, or sewerage. Water was collected from hanging out sail canvases, and stored in iron tanks or casks milk came from a nearby farm. Fishing continues on the Bay, but today only two fishing licences belong to descendants of these early pioneer settlers. The last remaining shack on the Bend was demolished in 1970, to make way for Webb Dock. The new Surf Life Saving Club headquarters stand on the site (Meiers 2006).

The neighbourhood of Fishermans Bend also has a significant place in Australian aviation history, being the home of several prominent historical Australian aircraft design and manufacturing companies, including the Commonwealth Aircraft Corporation, Holden, Smorgon Steel, Government Aircraft Factories, the Aeronautical Research Laboratory and regional facilities for Boeing. Fishermen's Bend Aerodrome remained in use until 1957.

Fishermans Bend is a primary industrial centre at the foot of the West Gate Bridge and contains major establishments for the Defence Science and Technology Organisation, Holden, Hawker de Havilland, GKN Aerospace Engineering Services, the Cooperative Research Centre for Advanced Composite Structures, Kraft Foods, Toyota Australia, port security and a campus of RMIT University.

It also has a marina, known as d'Albora Marinas Pier 35, and several container ship ports.

Fishermans Bend has a single large reserve known as Westgate Park, a large artificial wetland established in 1985.

== Notable people ==
Notable people who lived or worked in or represented Sandridge, later Port Melbourne;

- James Boyd (1867–1941), businessman and politician
- Charles Gordon Campbell (1840–1905), businessman and pastoralist
- William Darke (1810–1890), surveyor and colonist
- Gloria Dawn (1929–1978), actor
- Frederick Derham (1844–1922), businessman and politician
- William Howe (1864–1952), mayor and newspaperman
- Elwyn King (1894–1941), pilot and engineer
- Wilbraham Liardet (1799–1879), hotelier and artist
- John Madden (1844–1918), judge and politician
- Charles H. Martin (1894–1918), WW1 Australian Flying Corps pilot
- Jack Murray (1907–1983), racing driver
- Leslie Newman, (1878–1938), entomologist
- William Nicholson (1816–1865), businessman and politician
- James O’Collins (1892–1983), bishop
- William Reay (1858–1929), journalist and politician
- Edward Russell (1867–1943), trade unionist
- Hall Thorpe (1874–1947), artist
- J. L. Treloar (1894–1952), public servant
- Olive Zakharov, (1925–1995), politician

== See also ==
- City of Port Melbourne – Port Melbourne was previously within this former local government area.
