= Box Hill Central =

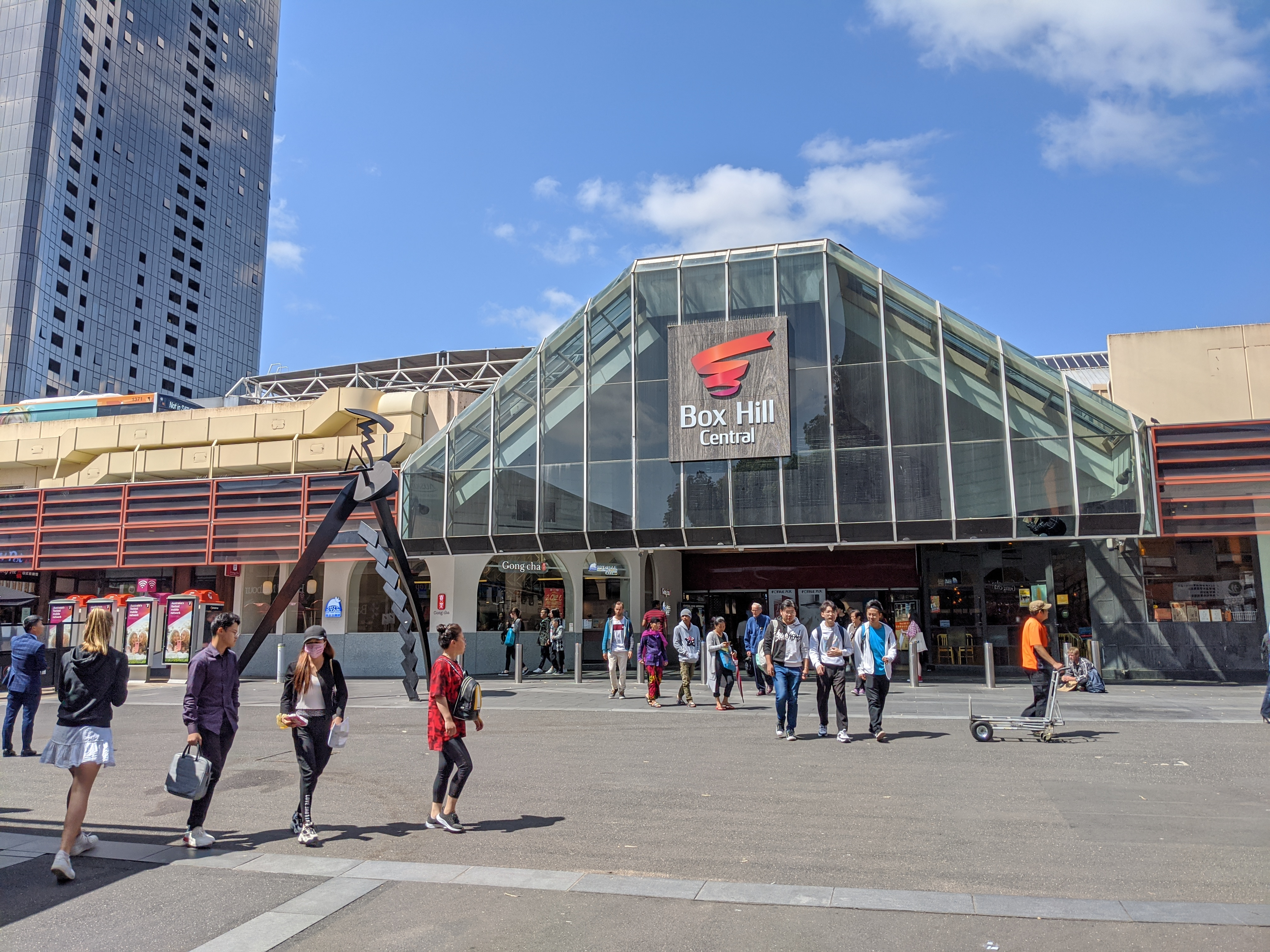
- Location: Box Hill, Victoria, Australia
- Coordinates: 37°49′10″S 145°7′24″E
- Opened: 1975 (North) 1987 (South)
- Developer: Vicinity Centres
- Manager: Vicinity Centres
- Owner: Vicinity Centres (100%)
- Num. of stores: 157 North: 40 South: 117
- Num. of anchor tenants: 2 North: 0 South: 2
- Floor area: 40,094 m^{2} (431,570 sq ft) North: 14,641 m^{2} (157,590 sq ft) South: 25,453 m^{2} (273,970 sq ft)
- Floors: 3
- Parking: 2,303 North: 858 South: 1,445
- Public transit: Train (Box Hill), Tram (109), Bus (Box Hill Bus Station)
- Website: www.boxhillcentral.com.au

Box Hill Central is a regional shopping centre complex and public transport hub located in the eastern Melbourne suburb of Box Hill, Australia. It is made up of two separate centres, Box Hill Central South and Box Hill Central North. The centre is approximately 16 kilometres (10 mi) east of the Melbourne central business district.

With over 40,000 m^{2} (430,000 sq ft) of leasable area, the centre features the largest concentration of retail space in Box Hill, one of nine designated Metropolitan Activity Centres in Melbourne that are centralised hubs of employment, services and housing. After years of consolidating nearby property holdings, Box Hill Central is currently undergoing a major expansion as part of a 10 year masterplan scheduled to be fully completed by 2030.

== History ==
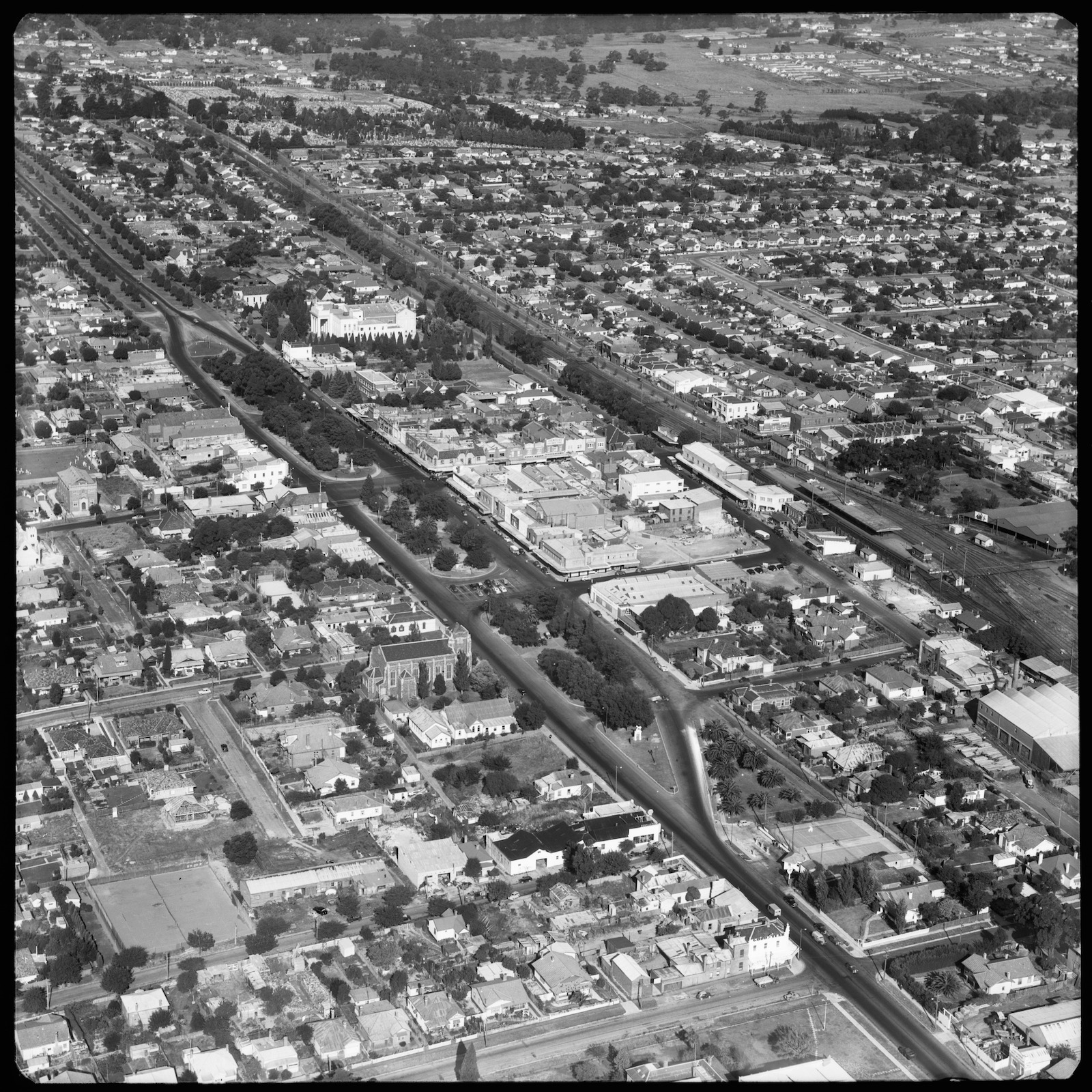
Aerial view of Box Hill in 1953 looking east along Whitehorse Road showing the site of Box Hill Central prior to development.

=== Background ===
The rapid expansion of Melbourne's suburbs following the Second World War caused significant population increases in the eastern parts of the metropolitan area. Box Hill, previously a separate town, became more connected to the rest of the city and grew in importance as a regional centre.

Following the opening of the Forest Hill Chase shopping centre in 1964, the Box Hill City Council and existing business owners in Box Hill became worried about the competition this would bring. A spate of further centralised shopping centres built in nearby Ringwood and Doncaster only heightened their concerns and accelerated plans for Box Hill to develop its own retail hub. An old timber yard in Clisby Street had been identified as a possible site for a large-scale development in 1961 which now became the focal point for a new shopping centre.

=== Opening - north ===
The proposed shopping centre site was originally owned by Whitehorse Freeholds, a subsidiary of the Associated Investments Co. Developer Hanover Holdings took over the development in March 1972 but soon sold it to Lustig & Moar. Six residences, a timber yard and three shops were acquired and demolished for the project. Following many years of planning, tenders were called for a new multi-storey carpark and shopping centre in 1973. It opened as the Whitehorse Plaza on 25 November 1974 at a cost of $3.5 million. The three-level shopping centre had over fifty stores and housed anchor tenants Coles, Kmart, Venture and larger tenants like Sussans, Williams The Shoeman, Priceline, Lincraft, and Medicare, along with other assorted retailers, eateries, and services. This is the section today known as Box Hill Central North. The design of the original centre and multi-storey carpark, which employs a unique blend of Brutalist and Modernism themes, was curated by notable commercial architects Buchan Laird & Bawden. See historical image

=== Opening - south ===
Box Hill Central South opened on 15 June 1984 with about 100 stores, an elevated bus terminus, about a thousand car parking spaces and anchor tenants Safeway and Target. Its construction coincided with the rebuilding of Box Hill Station and removal of the Station Street level crossing. Market and Main Streets were closed to traffic and turned into pedestrian ways.

=== First redevelopment - south (1998-2000) ===
The shopping centre was reconstructed in 1998 and in 2000 and acquired by Centro Properties, who renamed it to Centro Box Hill South, though many still referred to it as Box Hill Central.

=== First redevelopment - north (2000-2003) ===
Due to a lack of tenants, Whitehorse Plaza closed in 2000 before undergoing a complete refurbishment. All tenancies within the centre were demolished, the development's layout and car parks were reconfigured, and there was major refurbishment of external and internal facades. Named Whitehorse City before opening, the centre was reopened on 1 July 2003 by Centro Properties as Centro Whitehorse, a two-level regional shopping centre, featuring anchor tenants Coles and Best & Less.

=== Second redevelopment - north (2007) ===
In 2007, Centro Whitehorse was rebranded to Centro Box Hill North and partially redeveloped, with Best & Less closing down and being replaced by a Harris Scarfe location.

On 2 February 2020, Harris Scarfe closed its store at Box Hill, as part of its restructure and reduction in store locations. The location was leased to Dimmeys. The Coles supermarket closed in August 2022 and relocated to Box Hill Central South.

=== Second redevelopment - south (2010) ===
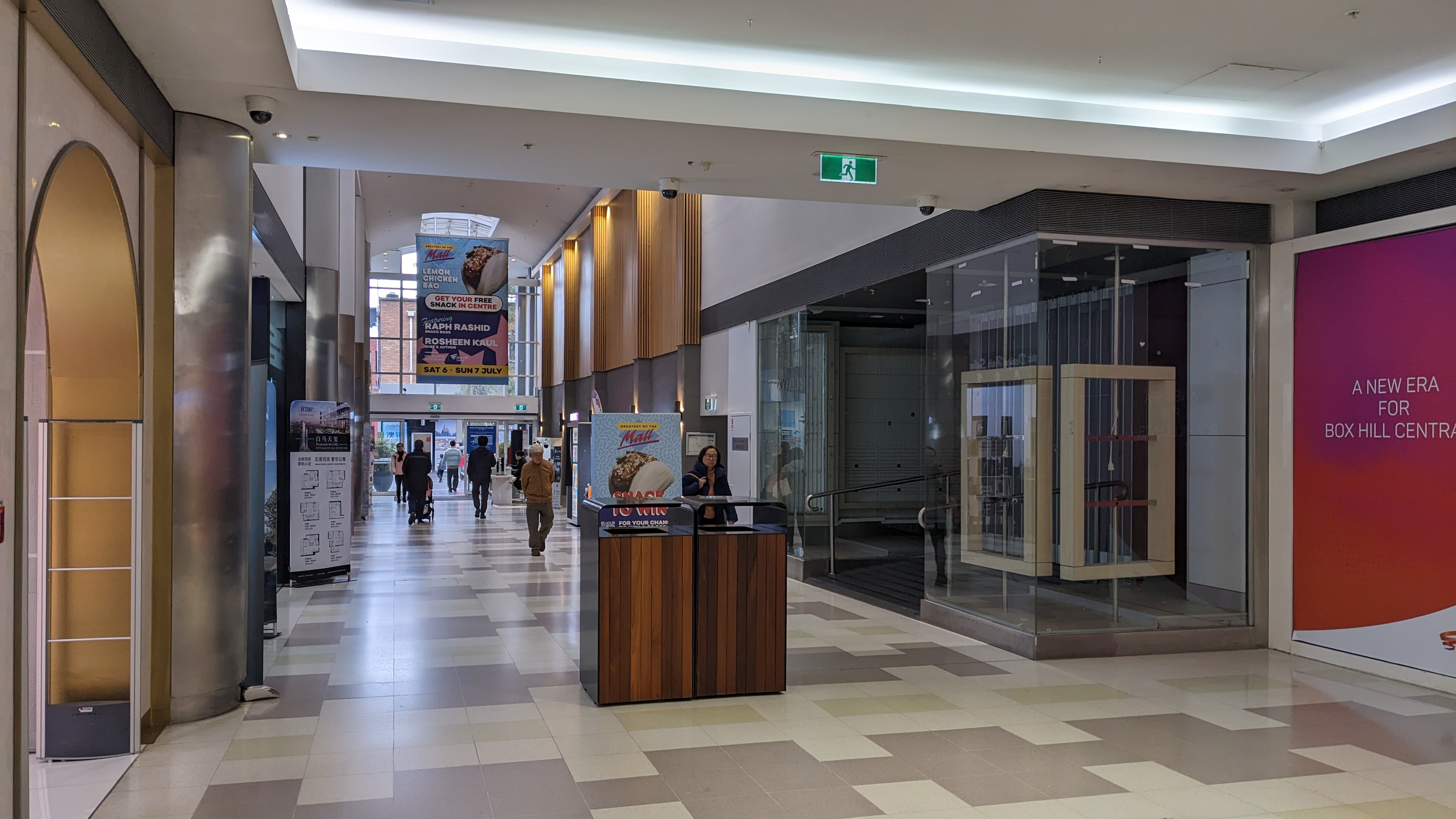
Interior of main corridor looking east near entrance to Box Hill Central North Shopping Centre, part of the area redeveloped in 2010.

In 2010, the shopping centre was again refurbished, with Target being replaced by Big W, and Woolworths being renovated and reopened.

=== Rebranding and consolidation (2013) ===
In 2013, both centres were again rebranded as Box Hill Central South and Box Hill Central North as a result of an organisation-wide rebranding of all centres owned by Federation Limited.

=== Third redevelopment and masterplan (2021-onwards) ===
In 2020 Vicinity Centres released a masterplan planning significant changes to both the north and south sections of the centre. It outlined plans to move retail activity to the south side of the site, construct additional office and residential towers, and provide new open space. Upon completion, it is planned to cover over 250,000 m^{2} (2,700,000 sq ft) of residential, office and retail area.

The first stage of the ten year masterplan commenced in July 2021 and was completed in August 2022. This added a new entrance to Box Hill Central South to the south from Carrington Road and rebuilt the south-western corner of the site to a new design and with additional retail space. A new Coles supermarket replaced the former Big W.

== Complex ==
=== Box Hill Central North ===
This older and largest section of the complex was formerly known as Whitehorse Plaza. It comprises two floors with some minor office use.

=== Box Hill Central South ===
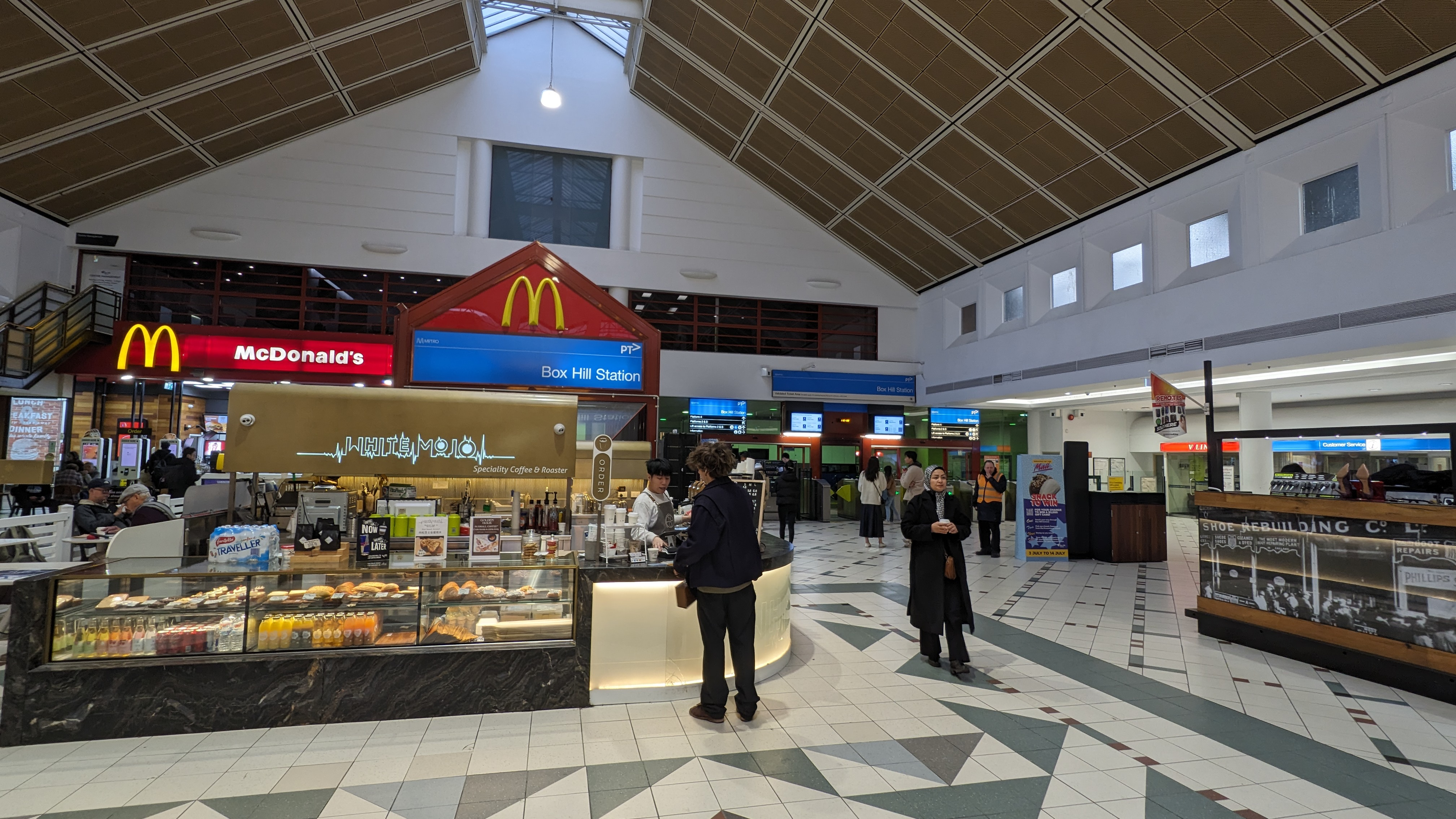
Main entrance hall in Box Hill Central South near the entrance to Box Hill Railway Station.

Straddling the underground railway station, this building is bounded by Station Street, Carrington Road, Thurston Street and Main Street. It is significantly larger than its northern counterpart and consists of several newer and older sections.

=== Office use ===
Both centres have office facilities located above or adjacent to the retail areas. Box Hill Central South provides 4,100 m^{2} (44,000 sq ft) of co-working office space while the North houses a small number of medical facilities.

=== Transport interchange ===
Box Hill Central South is built above the underground Box Hill railway station with the entrance contained inside the shopping centre. It provides a direct link through the shopping complex to the Box Hill Bus Station on its roof, servicing 18 different bus routes. The centre is also serviced by tram route 109 with its terminus nearby on Whitehorse Road.

Box Hill Central has seven levels of undercover car parking spread across the south and north sections of the complex. Some bicycle parking is also located at most major entrances.

== Retail ==
The two shopping centres have a combined 157 shops and services across a gross leasable area of 40,094 m^{2} (431,570 sq ft). The majority of this area is located in Box Hill Central South. Its two anchor tenants, Coles and Woolworths supermarkets, occupy 31% of the total leasable space of the South complex. Coles was formerly located in the Box Hill Central North complex before moving to its present space in 2022.

Other mini major retailers in Box Hill Central include NQR, Priceline Pharmacy, Daiso and Dimmeys.

A large portion of both centres are dedicated to food and beverage outlets. These are concentrated in two central food courts, one in each of the centres, as well as along Main Street between the two buildings.

Previous tenants of Box Hill Central include Big W, Kmart, Kmart Food, Target, Venture, Harris Scarfe, EB Games Australia, Sanity and Best & Less.

The Box Hill region is known for its Chinese population, with the first wave being Hong Kong Chinese followed by a larger wave of Mainland Chinese alongside a smaller number of Taiwanese, Malaysians and Vietnamese. This is reflected in the produce in many of the food and beverage outlets, medicinal herb retailers and clothing shops.
