= Port Melbourne railway line =

Railway line in Australia

Port Melbourne

Overview
- Status: Converted to tram route 109
- Connecting lines: St Kilda line

Service
- Type: Melbourne suburban service

History
- Opened: September 12th 1854
- Closed: October 10th 1987 (passenger) October 16th 1987 (goods)

Technical
- Num of tracks: Double track

The Port Melbourne railway line is a former heavy rail line in Melbourne, Australia, opened in September 1854, that is now a light rail line. Named the Melbourne and Hobson's Bay Railway at the outset, it was instigated by the Melbourne and Hobson's Bay Railway Company to carry passengers arriving in Victoria at Station Pier and to alleviate the high cost of shipping goods using small vessels up the Yarra River to Melbourne. The line's conversion to light rail occurred in 1987; it is now served by tram route 109.

== Construction ==
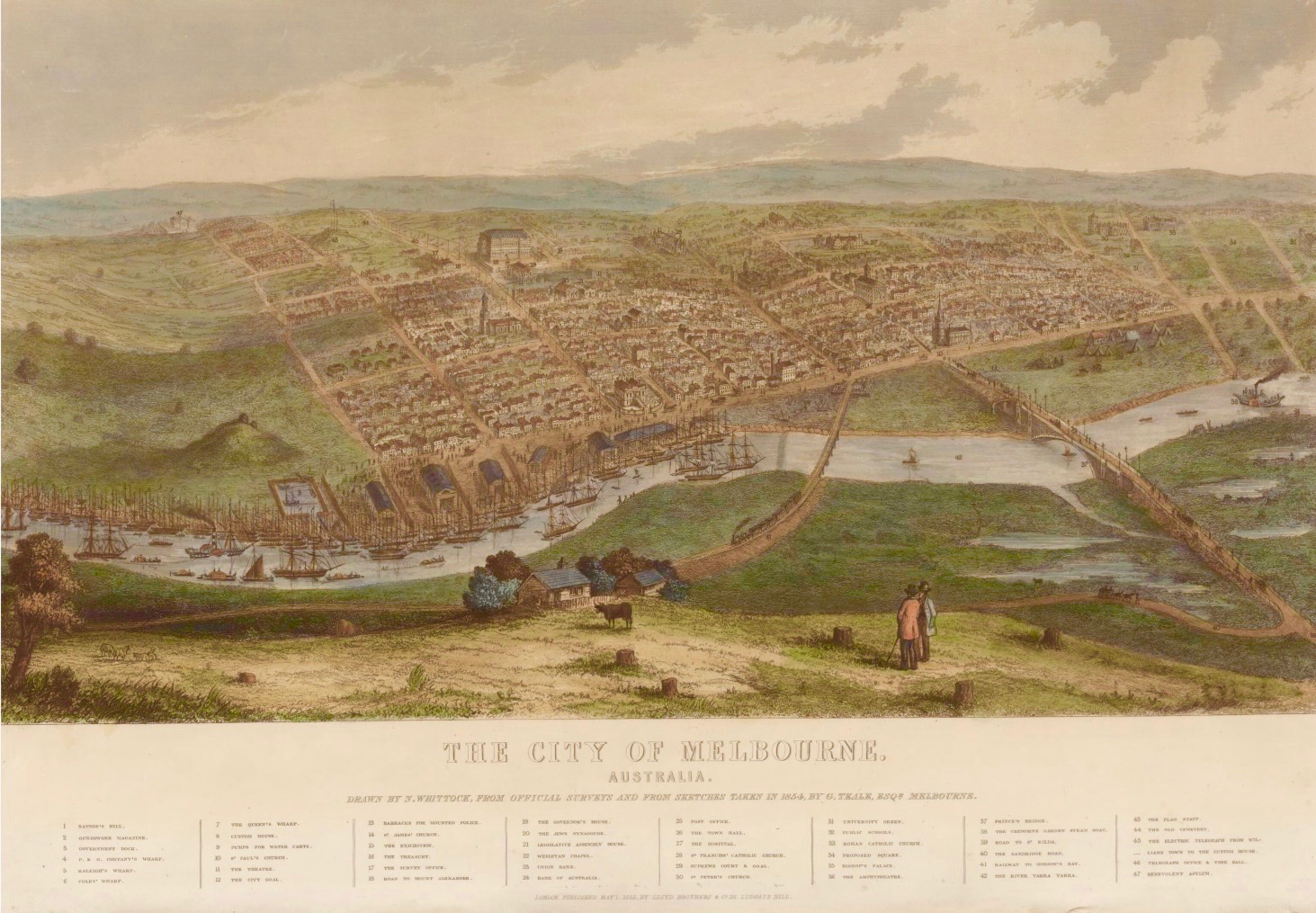
The Melbourne end of the Melbourne and Hobson's Bay Railway line (near the centre) crossed the Yarra River and stopped at the City Terminus on Flinders street, at the end of Queen Street

Work began on laying the railway in March 1853 under the supervision of the company's Engineer-in-Chief James Moore. Four locomotives, together with rolling stock, were ordered from Robert Stephenson and Company, of the United Kingdom, but because of manufacturing delays the first locomotive had to be built locally. Robertson, Martin & Smith, a local foundry and engineering company, built a small makeshift locomotive to the design of the railway company's engineer in ten weeks at a cost of £2,700. Its trial run was only three days before the railway's opening.

== Opening ==
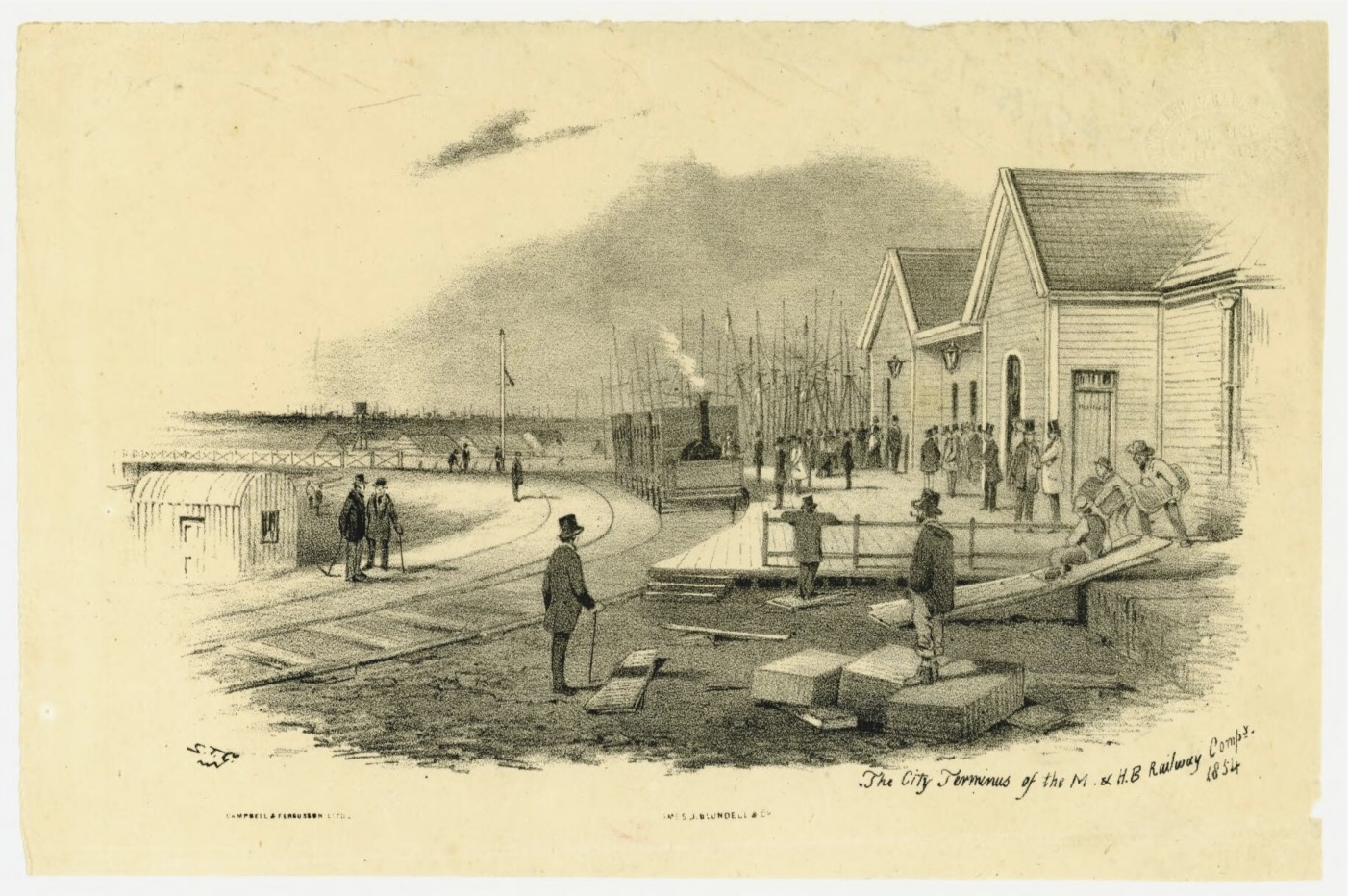
The line, inaugurated on 12 September 1854, was the first in Australia to be steam-powered. A train is pictured arriving at the company's City Terminus at Flinders Street.

The line was opened on 12 September 1854. It ran for 4.2 kilometres (2.6 miles) from the "City Terminus" on the site of present-day Flinders Street station, crossing the Yarra River via the Sandridge Bridge, to Sandridge (now Port Melbourne). According to the Argus newspaper's report of the next day, "Long before the hour appointed ... a great crowd assembled round the station at the Melbourne terminus, lining the whole of Flinders Street". Lieutenant-Governor Charles Hotham and Lady Hotham were aboard the train, which consisted of two first-class carriages, one second-class carriage and, next to the locomotive, an open third-class carriage holding the band of the 40th Regiment.

The line has an established place in Australian history: it was the first in Australia to operate with steam locomotives. However, the locomotive at the opening was not the first steam locomotive in Australia: a makeshift locomotive hastily made from a ballast wagon and the boiler, cylinders and mechanism from a pile driver started service on 30 May 1854, hauling ballast wagons during the remaining 15 weeks of track construction and hauling regular scheduled trains when the usual locomotive was withdrawn after major breakdowns.

The trip took 10 minutes, none of the later stations along the line having been built. On arriving at Station Pier, on to which the tracks extended, the train was hailed with gun-salutes by the warships HMS Electra and HMS Fantome.

== Subsequent history ==
By March 1855, the four engines ordered from the UK were all in service, with trains running every half-hour. They were named Melbourne, Sandridge, Victoria, and Yarra.

The line was taken over by the Government of Victoria in 1878, to become part of Victorian Railways. The line was electrified in the 20th century.

Prior to the opening of the City Loop in 1981, all services were timetabled to through run from Flinders Street towards Sandringham. After 1981 until the lines closure, all services terminated at Flinders Street on either platforms 10 or 11.

== Conversion to light rail ==
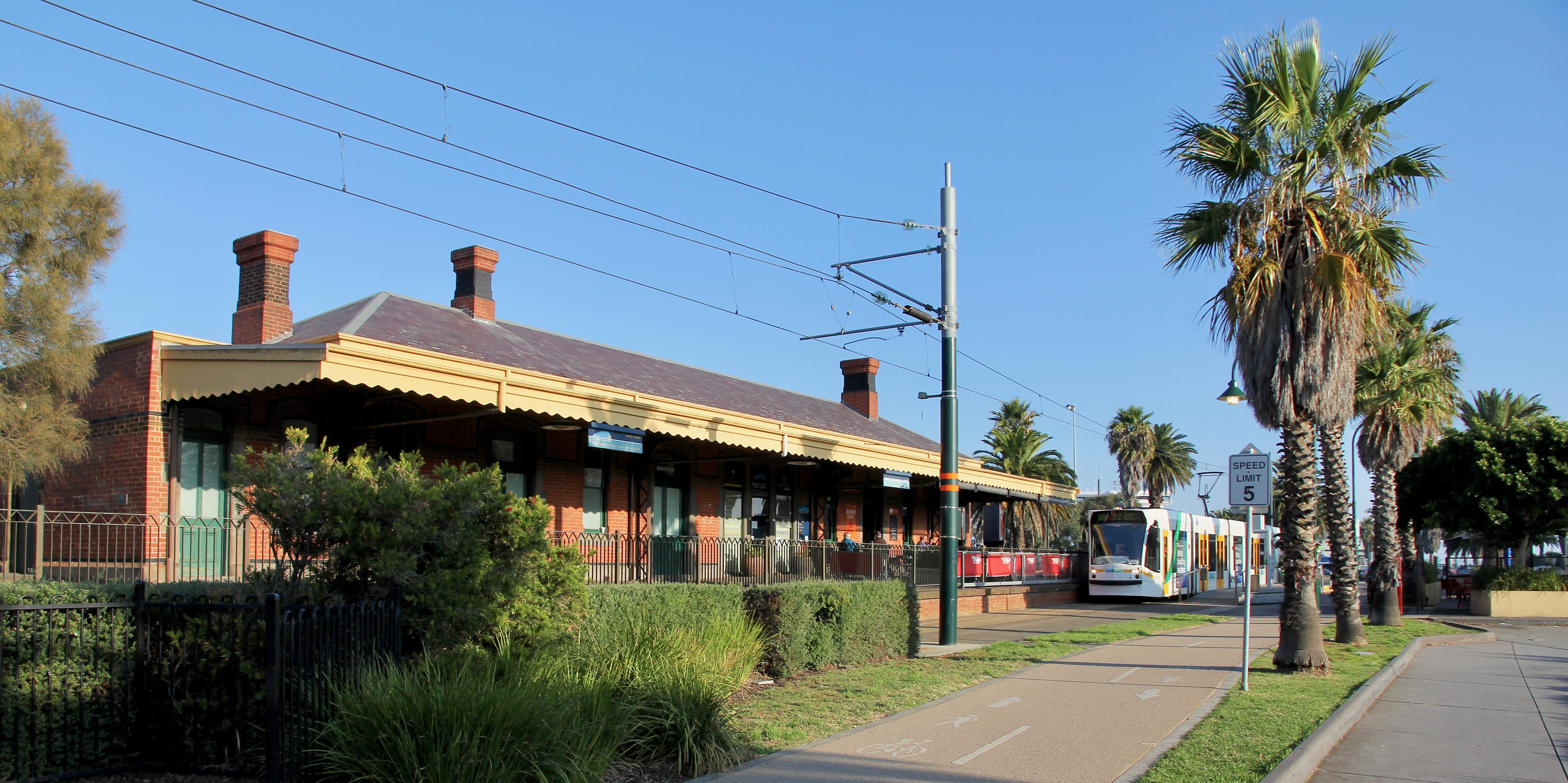
D-class Melbourne tram on route 109 at Port Melbourne. The former railway station building housed a medical centre and restaurant.

Looking towards Port Melbourne from the Swallow Street level crossing, 2007. Tram and road traffic movements are controlled by traffic lights.

Along with the St Kilda railway line, the conversion the line to light rail was first announced on 13 January 1983, by the Victorian state government, with cost estimates at the time of around $6 million.

The line was closed on 10 October 1987, three months after the closure of the St Kilda railway line. The last service departed Port Melbourne station at 18.03, with freight services to Montague continuing until 16 October of the same year. The line reopened as part of the Melbourne tram network on 18 December 1987.

Melbourne tram route 109 now operates on the converted track. The section from Southbank Junction to Port Melbourne was converted to light rail, requiring the conversion from broad gauge 1,600 mm (5 ft 3 in) used by the Melbourne rail network to 1,435 mm (4 ft 8 1/2 in) standard gauge tram track, as well as reducing the overhead voltage from 1,500 V DC to 600 V DC required for the trams. Additionally, low level platforms were built on the sites of the former stations to accommodate the trams which contained steps to street level. Low floor trams have since been introduced to the route.

== Line guide ==
Bold stations are termini.

== Background reading ==
- Sandridge Railway Trail: rail map, notes and history
- "Victorian Railways 1950s map" (PDF). Victorian Railways Resources.
