= Melbourne tram route 109 =

Tram route in metropolitan Melbourne, Victoria

Route 109

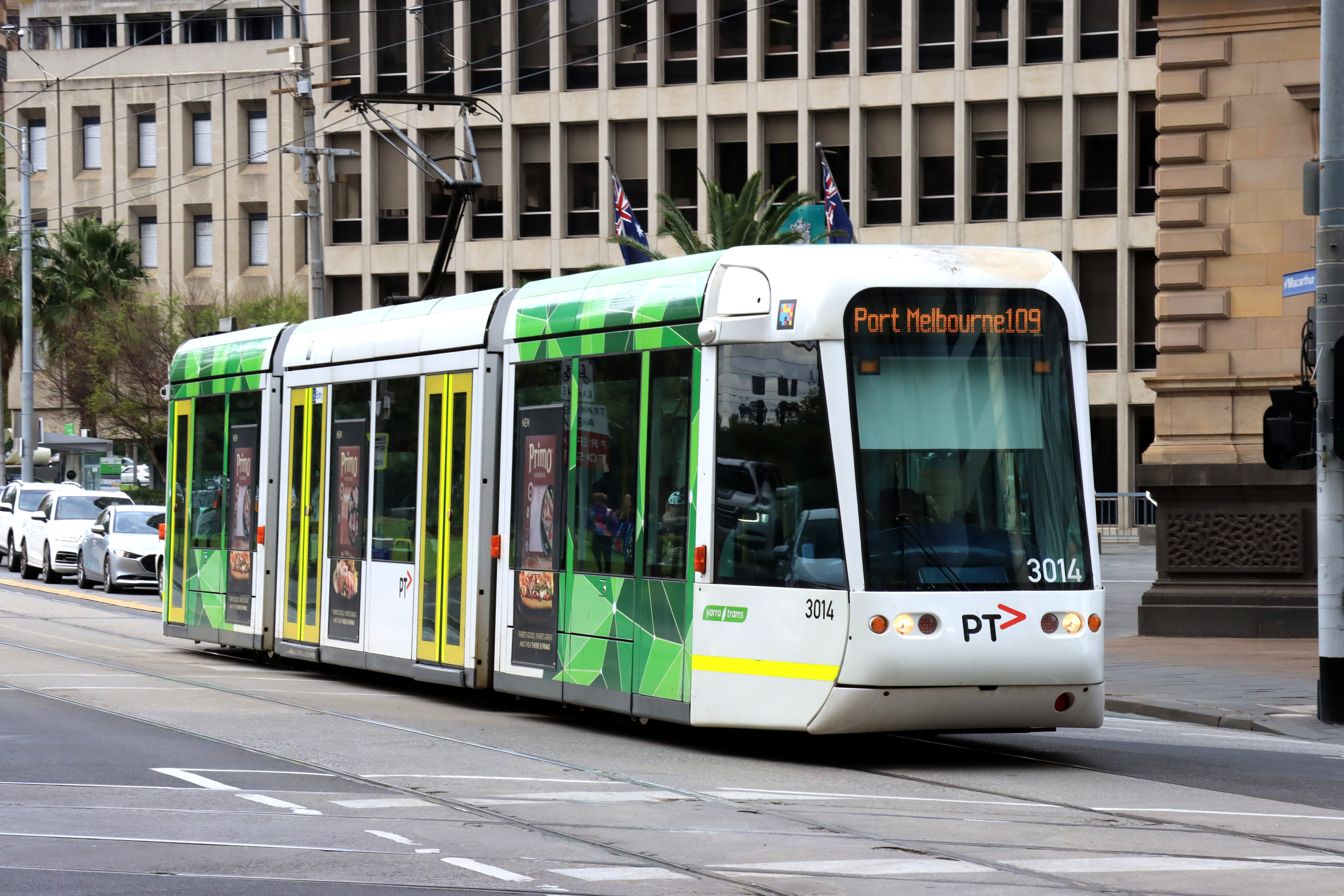
- C-Class tram C.3014 on MacArthur Street, September 2024

Overview
- System: Melbourne
- Operator: Yarra Trams
- Depot: Kew
- Vehicle: A class C class
- Began service: 19 December 1993
- Predecessors: Route 42, 111
- Night-time: Friday & Saturday

Route
- Start: Box Hill
- Via: Whitehorse Road; Victoria Street; Collins Street
- End: Port Melbourne
- Length: 19.3 kilometres
- Timetable: Route 109 timetable
- Map: Route 109 map

Melbourne tram route 109 is a tram route on the Melbourne tram network serving the city of Melbourne in Victoria, Australia. Operated by Yarra Trams, the route is coloured orange and extends from Box Hill to Port Melbourne over 19.3 kilometre of double track via Whitehorse Road, Victoria Street and Collins Street. It is serviced out of Kew depot utilising A and C class trams.

== History ==
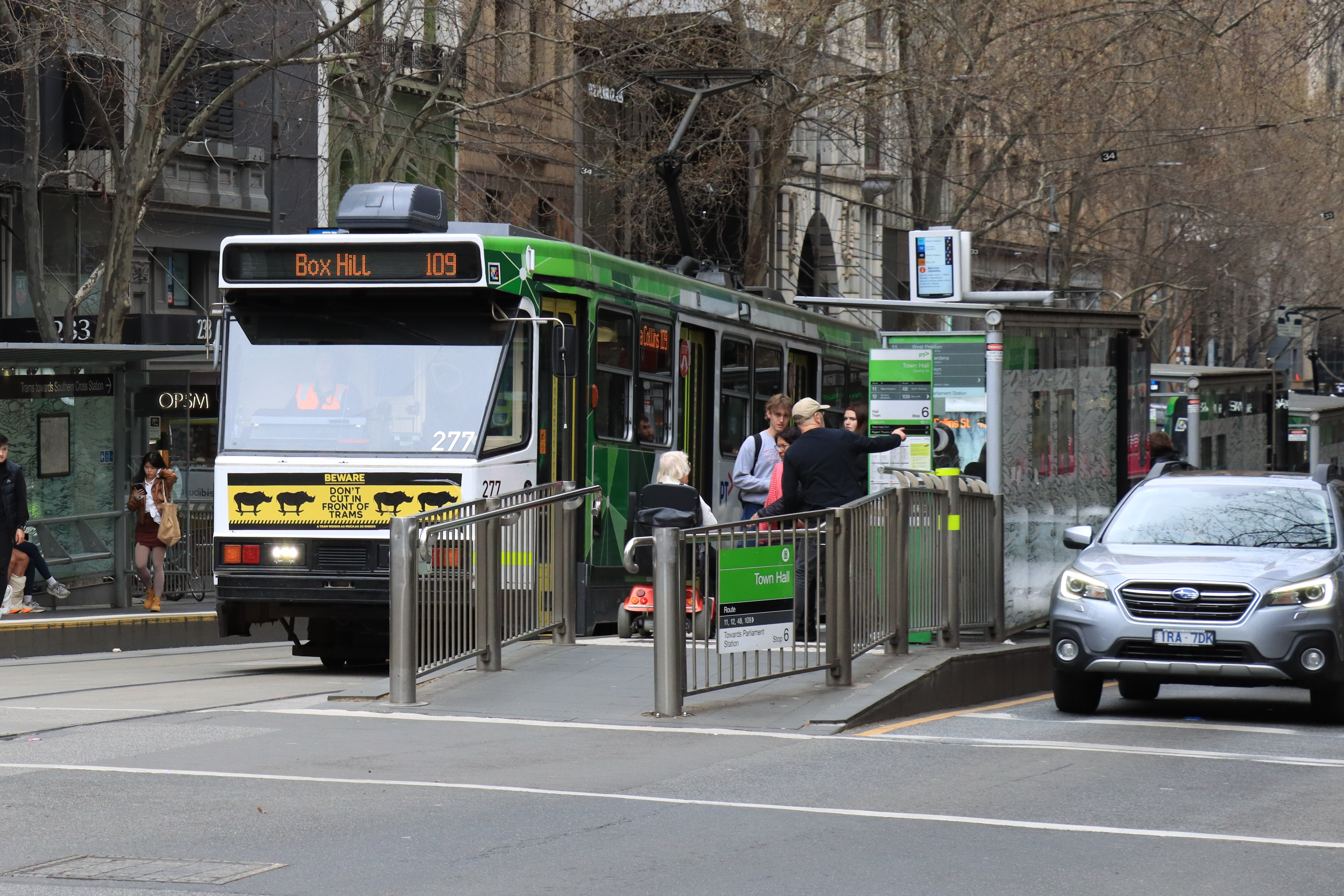
Older A class trams are also used on route 109.

The origins of route 109 lie in separate tram lines, a cable tram from Spencer Street to the Yarra River, a horse tram from the Yarra River to Kew Cemetery, an electric line from Kew Junction to Box Hill (extended over the years), as well as the Port Melbourne railway line.

A cable line was opened by the Melbourne Tramway & Omnibus Company from Spencer Street to Brunswick Street along Collins Street, MacArthur Street, Gisborne Street and Victoria Parade on 2 October 1886, and extended to the west side of the Yarra River along Victoria Parade and Victoria Street on 22 November 1886. A connecting horse tram was built from the east side of the Yarra River to Kew Cemetery, along Barkers Road, High Street South and High Street, opening on 28 December 1887.

The Prahran & Malvern Tramways Trust (PMTT) opened a line from High Street to Burke Road along Cotham Road on 30 May 1913. On 1 November 1914 the PMTT received permission to convert the horse tram line to electric traction, and the new electric line was opened on 24 February 1915. The PMTT extended the Cotham Road line to Union Road, Mont Albert along Whitehorse Road, on 30 September 1916.

In 1929 the Melbourne & Metropolitan Tramways Board (MMTB) started converting the Collins Street cable lines to electric traction, with the last cable tram running down Collins Street on 14 September 1929, and the first electric tram on 8 December 1929. At the same time the MMTB built a new electric line down the centre of Victoria Parade to replace the cable line, which opened on 15 September 1929. For the next six decades the Melbourne to Mont Albert tram was numbered 42, celebrated by a 1982 theatrical production, Storming Mont Albert by Tram, which was performed on a specially-chartered Route 42 tram from the Mont Albert terminus to the city and return.

On 21 December 1987, route 111 commenced running from Exhibition (Carlton Gardens) at Nicholson Street to Port Melbourne along Bourke Street, Spencer Street and the former Port Melbourne railway line, following the conversion of the railway (along with the St Kilda line) to light rail. The broad gauge 1,600 mm (5 ft 3 in) track was re-gauged to standard gauge 1,435 mm (4 ft 8 1/2 in) and the overhead voltage was reduced from 1500 V DC to 600 V DC with light rail platforms built adjacent to or near the former stations platforms.

On 19 December 1993, routes 42 and 111 were combined as route 109. Route 42 continued to run as a peak-hour variant of route 109, and from 18 November 2002, the route deviated from route 109 and ran between Box Hill and the Collins Street West extension in Docklands. From 28 June 2004 until 21 November 2005, the route was truncated back to Spencer Street while Spencer Street station (now Southern Cross station) was redeveloped. It was extended further along the Collins Street extension to Victoria Harbour (Merchant Street) on 21 September 2009. At this point, the route ran one morning trip and three afternoon trips from Box Hill to Victoria Harbour and then back to Box Hill. Route 42 was last listed as an official route in late 2010 / early 2011 before it gradually disappeared without an official announcement.

When Station Pier was refurbished in 1999, tram tracks were laid to allow for route 109 to be extended onto the pier, but have never been connected.

The line was extended from its original terminus at Mont Albert to Box Hill along Whitehorse Road for 2.2 kilometres on 2 May 2003. Until approximately May 2013, the line included a stop (numbered 26) at Harrison Crescent. In January 2016, route 109 began operating through the night on Fridays and Saturdays as part of the Night Network.

== Route ==
Interactive map of Melbourne tram route 109.

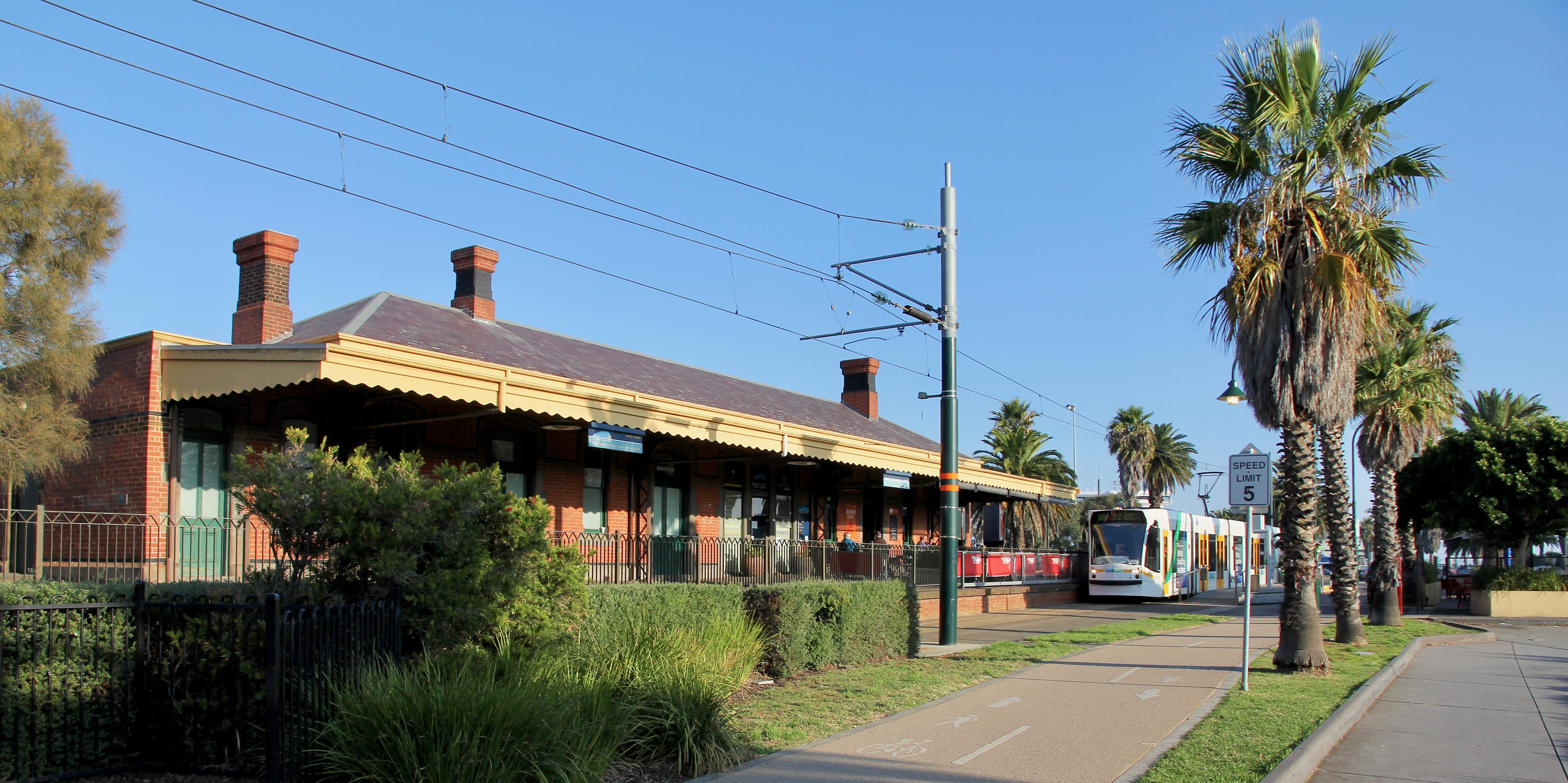
The Port Melbourne terminus, with the Port Melbourne railway station building in the foreground

Route 109 runs from Box Hill, travelling west on Whitehorse Road through the suburbs of Mont Albert, Surrey Hills, Balwyn and Deepdene. Entering Kew at Burke Road, Whitehorse Road becomes Cotham Road. It continues west, through Kew Junction and then south west along High Street, High Street South and turns west into Barkers Road.

It crosses the Yarra River into Victoria Street, Richmond and continues west. At Hoddle Street Victoria Street becomes Victoria Parade, and it passes through St Vincent's Plaza, passing St Vincent's Hospital, the Royal Victorian Eye and Ear Hospital and then turns south onto Gisborne Street. It then continues southwest along MacArthur Street and turns west into Collins Street, entering the CBD, passing Melbourne Town Hall and City Square.

It turns south into Spencer Street, passing Southern Cross station, then crosses the Yarra River and enters Southbank on Clarendon Street before traversing the suburbs of South Melbourne and Port Melbourne on a right-of-way using the former Port Melbourne railway line and terminates at Port Melbourne railway station near Station Pier.

== Operation ==
Route 109 is operated out of Kew depot with C class trams and A class trams. For a period from 2002, some services were also operated out of Southbank depot.

== Bus route ==
When cruise ships are berthed at Station Pier, Transit Systems Victoria operate a parallel bus service as route 109 between Station Pier and Queens Bridge St.
