= Electoral results for the district of Mulgrave (Victoria) =

Victoria, Australia, district election results

This is a list of electoral results for the district of Mulgrave in Victorian state elections.

== Members for Mulgrave ==
First incarnation (1958–1967)
Member	Party	Term
Ray Wiltshire	Liberal and Country	1958–1967
Ray Wiltshire	Liberal	1958–1967
Second incarnation (2002–present)
Member	Party	Term
Daniel Andrews	Labor	2002–2023
Eden Foster	Labor	2023–present

== Election results ==
=== Elections in the 2020s ===
==== 2023 by-election ====
2023 Mulgrave state by-election
Party	Candidate	Votes	%	±%
Labor	Eden Foster	14,481	40.18	−10.82
Liberal	Courtney Mann	7,817	21.69	+4.50
Independent	Ian Cook	6,780	18.81	+0.80
Greens	Rhonda Garad	2,153	5.97	+0.89
Victorian Socialists	Kelly Cvetkova	1,315	3.65	+3.65
Family First	Jane Foreman	1,111	3.08	+1.11
Libertarian	Ethelyn King	1,046	2.90	+2.90
Independent	Tina Theodossopoulou	662	1.84	+1.04
Animal Justice	Bronwyn Currie	403	1.12	+1.12
Sustainable Australia	Celeste Ackerly	276	0.77	+0.77
Total formal votes		36,044	94.46	+3.13
Informal votes		2,112	5.54	−3.13
Turnout		38,156	80.94	−7.46
Notional two-party-preferred count
Labor	Eden Foster	19,704	54.67	−5.53
Liberal	Courtney Mann	16,340	45.33	+5.53
Two-candidate-preferred result
Labor	Eden Foster	20,363	56.49	−4.34
Independent	Ian Cook	15,681	43.51	+4.34
Labor hold		Swing	−4.34	

==== 2022 ====
2022 Victorian state election: Mulgrave
Party	Candidate	Votes	%	±%
Labor	Daniel Andrews	19,365	51.0	−8.5
Independent	Ian Cook	6,838	18.0	+18.0
Liberal	Michael Piastrino	6,528	17.2	−11.0
Greens	Robert Lim	1,930	5.1	−1.3
Freedom	Aidan McLindon	824	2.2	+2.2
Family First	Jane Foreman	749	2.0	+2.0
Animal Justice	David Mould	419	1.1	+0.9
Democratic Labour	Maree Wood	327	0.9	−1.3
Independent	Fotini Theodossopoulou	305	0.8	+0.8
Independent	Andrew King	173	0.4	+0.4
Ind. (PIBCI)	Joseph Toscano	155	0.4	+0.4
Independent	Anne Moody	146	0.4	+0.4
Independent	Howard Lee	120	0.3	+0.3
Independent	Ezra J. D. Isma	92	0.2	+0.2
Total formal votes		37,924	91.2	−2.7
Informal votes		3,650	8.7	+2.7
Turnout		41,574	88.4	+3.3
Notional two-party-preferred count
Labor	Daniel Andrews	22,976	60.2	−5.6
Liberal	Michael Piastrino	15,191	39.8	+5.6
Two-candidate-preferred result
Labor	Daniel Andrews	23,070	60.8	−5.0
Independent	Ian Cook	14,854	39.2	+39.2
Labor hold		Swing	−5.0	

=== Elections in the 2010s ===
==== 2018 ====
2018 Victorian state election: Mulgrave
Party	Candidate	Votes	%	±%
Labor	Daniel Andrews	19,649	56.73	+8.89
Liberal	Maree Davenport	11,390	32.89	−7.91
Greens	Ovi Rajasinghe	2,154	6.22	−0.82
Democratic Labour	Des Kelly	942	2.72	+2.72
Transport Matters	Nadeem Malik	499	1.44	+1.44
Total formal votes		34,634	94.29	−0.53
Informal votes		2,098	5.71	+0.53
Turnout		36,732	90.50	−2.43
Two-party-preferred result
Labor	Daniel Andrews	21,708	62.71	+8.23
Liberal	Maree Davenport	12,911	37.30	−8.23
Labor hold		Swing	+8.23	

==== 2014 ====
2014 Victorian state election: Mulgrave
Party	Candidate	Votes	%	±%
Labor	Daniel Andrews	17,150	47.8	+2.8
Liberal	Robert Davies	14,622	40.8	−2.4
Greens	Josh Fergeus	2,525	7.0	−0.2
Family First	Norman Fenn	969	2.7	−0.3
Rise Up Australia	Maree Wood	579	1.6	+1.6
Total formal votes		35,845	94.8	+0.6
Informal votes		1,960	5.2	−0.6
Turnout		37,805	92.9	−0.8
Two-party-preferred result
Labor	Daniel Andrews	19,528	54.5	+2.1
Liberal	Robert Davies	16,317	45.5	−2.1
Labor hold		Swing	+2.1	

==== 2010 ====
2010 Victorian state election: Mulgrave
Party	Candidate	Votes	%	±%
Labor	Daniel Andrews	15,392	50.68	−8.13
Liberal	Courtney Mann	11,166	36.77	+8.18
Greens	John Janetzki	2,173	7.16	+0.74
Family First	Jim Johnson	1,041	3.43	−2.75
Democratic Labor	Geraldine Kokoszka	596	1.96	+1.96
Total formal votes		30,368	93.62	−0.43
Informal votes		2,069	6.38	+0.43
Turnout		32,437	92.69	−0.36
Two-party-preferred result
Labor	Daniel Andrews	17,779	58.48	−7.29
Liberal	Courtney Mann	12,623	41.52	+7.29
Labor hold		Swing	−7.29	

=== Elections in the 2000s ===
==== 2006 ====
2006 Victorian state election: Mulgrave
Party	Candidate	Votes	%	±%
Labor	Daniel Andrews	17,491	58.8	−2.9
Liberal	Ashton Ashokkumar	8,502	28.6	−2.3
Greens	Jon Owen	1,909	6.4	+0.3
Family First	Penny Badwal	1,839	6.2	+6.2
Total formal votes		29,741	94.1	−1.8
Informal votes		1,880	5.9	+1.8
Turnout		31,621	93.1	
Two-party-preferred result
Labor	Daniel Andrews	19,515	65.6	−0.6
Liberal	Ashton Ashokkumar	10,226	34.4	+0.6
Labor hold		Swing	−0.6	

==== 2002 ====
2002 Victorian state election: Mulgrave
Party	Candidate	Votes	%	±%
Labor	Daniel Andrews	18,804	61.7	+9.8
Liberal	Chris Kelly	9,431	30.9	−12.6
Greens	Colin Smith	1,845	6.1	+6.1
Independent	Dikran Chabdjian	410	1.3	+1.3
Total formal votes		30,490	95.8	−0.4
Informal votes		1,325	4.2	+0.4
Turnout		31,815	92.7	
Two-party-preferred result
Labor	Daniel Andrews	20,188	66.2	+11.9
Liberal	Chris Kelly	10,296	33.8	−11.9
Labor hold		Swing	+11.9	

=== Elections in the 1960s ===
==== 1964 ====
1964 Victorian state election: Mulgrave
Party	Candidate	Votes	%	±%
Liberal and Country	Ray Wiltshire	27,408	50.5	+2.7
Labor	Aubrey Walker	18,598	34.3	−2.1
Democratic Labor	Ivan Frawley	8,233	15.2	+0.7
Total formal votes		54,239	98.6	+0.3
Informal votes		790	1.4	−0.3
Turnout		55,029	94.8	−0.1
Two-party-preferred result
Liberal and Country	Ray Wiltshire	34,406	63.4	+1.8
Labor	Aubrey Walker	19,833	36.6	−1.8
Liberal and Country hold		Swing	+1.8	

==== 1961 ====
1961 Victorian state election: Mulgrave
Party	Candidate	Votes	%	±%
Liberal and Country	Ray Wiltshire	20,478	47.8	−2.1
Labor	Vincent Scully	15,610	36.4	−0.6
Democratic Labor	Leo Sparrow	6,840	15.9	+2.8
Total formal votes		42,928	98.3	−0.1
Informal votes		736	1.7	+0.1
Turnout		43,664	94.9	+0.4
Two-party-preferred result
Liberal and Country	Ray Wiltshire	26,456	61.6	+1.1
Labor	Vincent Scully	16,472	38.4	−1.1
Liberal and Country hold		Swing	+1.1	

=== Elections in the 1950s ===
==== 1958 ====
1958 Victorian state election: Mulgrave
Party	Candidate	Votes	%	±%
Liberal and Country	Ray Wiltshire	14,776	49.9	
Labor	John Neal	10,957	37.0	
Democratic Labor	Leo Sparrow	3,884	13.1	
Total formal votes		29,617	98.4	
Informal votes		489	1.6	
Turnout		30,106	94.5	
Two-party-preferred result
Liberal and Country	Ray Wiltshire	17,906	60.5	
Labor	John Neal	11,711	39.5	
Liberal and Country hold		Swing		
