= Results of the 2020 Victorian local elections in South-Eastern Melbourne =

2020 Victorian local elections (Inner Melbourne)
← 2016	24 October 2020	2024 →

This is a list of results for the 2020 Victorian local elections in the South-Eastern Melbourne region.

South-Eastern Melbourne covers the local government areas (LGAs) of Bayside, Cardinia, Casey, Frankston, Glen Eira, Greater Dandenong, Kingston, Mornington Peninsula and Stonnington.

== Bayside ==
2020 Victorian local elections: Bayside
Party	Votes	%	Swing	Seats	Change
Independent	49,900	79.66		7	▲2
Liberal	7,040	11.23		0	▼2
Greens	4,894	7.81		0	Steady
Sustainable Australia	810	1.29	+1.29	0	Steady
Formal votes	62,644				

=== Beckett ===
2020 Victorian local elections: Beckett Ward
Party	Candidate	Votes	%	±%
Independent	Clarke Martin	3,905	43.59	+43.59
Greens	Crystal Cartwright	2,220	24.78	+24.78
Independent	Paul Kalimnakis	827	9.23	+9.23
Independent	David Williams	775	8.65	+8.65
Independent	Peter Varsamis	581	6.49	+6.49
Independent	Jennifer A. Randles	460	5.13	+5.13
Independent	Albert H.S. Matthews	191	2.13	+2.13
Turnout		8,959		
After distribution of preferences
Independent	Clarke Martin	4,519	50.44	+50.44
Greens	Crystal Cartwright	3,064	34.20	+34.20
Independent	Paul Kalimnakis	1,376	15.36	+15.36
Independent win		(new ward)		

=== Bleazby ===
2020 Victorian local elections: Bleazby Ward
Party	Candidate	Votes	%	±%
Independent	Alex Del Porto	2,264	24.61	+24.61
Independent	Karen Kimber	1,212	13.18	+13.18
Independent	Stavroula Psonis	1,060	11.52	+11.52
Independent	Rosie Grech	796	8.65	+8.65
Independent	Lindsey Joffe	712	7.74	+7.74
Independent	Steve Wolf	701	7.62	+7.62
Independent	David Fonda	588	6.39	+6.39
Independent	Darren Mitchell	411	4.47	+4.47
Independent	Jack Mills	369	4.01	+4.01
Independent	Phillip Goldberg	331	3.60	+3.60
Independent	Helen Tachos	309	3.36	+3.36
Independent	Carlo Toncich	236	2.57	+2.57
Independent	Thalia Kioussis	111	1.21	+1.21
Independent	Cedric Van Spall	98	1.07	+1.07
Turnout		9,198		
Two-candidate-preferred result
Independent	Alex Del Porto	4,927	53.57	+53.57
Independent	Stavroula Psonis	4,271	46.53	+46.53
Independent win		(new ward)		

=== Boyd ===
2020 Victorian local elections: Boyd Ward
Party	Candidate	Votes	%	±%
Liberal	Colleen Harkin	1,731	18.54	+18.54
Independent	Fiona Stitfold	1,537	16.46	+16.46
Independent	Craig Francis	1,302	13.94	+13.94
Independent	Evan Packer	1,260	13.49	+13.49
Independent	Olivia Russell	1,116	11.95	+11.95
Independent	Kylie McIntosh	1,054	11.29	+11.29
Greens	Jamie Paterson	1,029	11.02	+11.02
Independent	Michael Norris	309	3.31	+3.31
Turnout		9,338		
Two-candidate-preferred result
Independent	Fiona Stitfold	4,957	53.08	+53.08
Liberal	Colleen Harkin	4,381	46.92	+46.92
Independent win		(new ward)		

=== Castlefield ===
2020 Victorian local elections: Castlefield Ward
Party	Candidate	Votes	%	±%
Liberal	Rob Grinter	3,181	32.50	+32.50
Independent	Jo Samuel-King	1,487	15.19	+15.19
Independent	James Long	1,377	13.66	+13.66
Independent	Jessica Batt	1,326	13.55	+13.55
Independent	Kevin Howard	744	7.60	+7.60
Independent	David Rothfield	664	6.78	+6.78
Independent	Arron Wood	357	3.65	+3.65
Independent	Alistair Ward	298	3.04	+3.04
Independent	Timothy Wood	275	2.81	+2.81
Independent	Nicholas Batzialas	119	1.22	+1.22
Turnout		9,788		
Two-candidate-preferred result
Independent	Jo Samuel-King	5,154	52.66	+52.66
Liberal	Rob Grinter	4,634	47.34	+47.34
Independent win		(new ward)		

=== Dendy ===
2020 Victorian local elections: Dendy Ward
Party	Candidate	Votes	%	±%
Liberal	Michael Heffernan	2,128	24.82	+24.82
Independent	Hanna El Mouallem	1,503	17.53	+17.53
Independent	Joanne Bryant	1,271	14.82	+14.82
Independent	Daniel Cullen	714	8.33	+8.33
Independent	Anne Fitzgerald	649	7.57	+7.57
Independent	Joshua S. Goldstat	634	7.52	+7.52
Independent	David Lurie	622	7.25	+7.25
Independent	Sam Seoud	453	5.28	+5.28
Independent	Sarah Merrick	307	3.58	+3.58
Independent	Judy Farrugia	282	3.29	+3.29
Turnout		8,574		
Two-candidate-preferred result
Independent	Hanna El Mouallem	4,563	53.22	+53.22
Liberal	Michael Heffernan	4,011	46.78	+46.78
Independent win		(new ward)		

=== Ebden ===
2020 Victorian local elections: Ebden Ward
Party	Candidate	Votes	%	±%
Independent	Laurence Evans	2,616	30.86	+30.86
Independent	Anna Rabinov	1,174	13.85	+13.85
Independent	Carolyn D. Brown	1,153	13.60	+13.60
Independent	Clifford Mallard	991	11.69	+11.69
Independent	Leah Kaminsky	945	11.15	+11.15
Greens	Derek Wilson	890	10.50	+10.50
Independent	John Knight	708	8.35	+8.35
Turnout		8,574		
Two-candidate-preferred result
Independent	Laurence Evans	5,130	60.52	+60.52
Independent	Anna Rabinov	3,347	39.48	+39.48
Independent win		(new ward)		

=== Ivison ===
2020 Victorian local elections: Ivison Ward
Party	Candidate	Votes	%	±%
Independent	Sonia Castelli	1,718	20.67	+20.67
Independent	Marlene J. Johnson	1,658	19.95	+19.95
Sustainable Australia	Brandon Hoult	810	9.75	+9.75
Independent	Gio Fitzpatrick	806	9.70	+9.70
Greens	Sarah Dekiere	755	9.09	+9.09
Independent	Scott Porteus	618	7.44	+7.44
Independent	Marcus Barber	612	7.36	+7.36
Independent	Nicole Finn	609	7.33	+7.33
Independent	Kannan Nair	452	5.44	+5.44
Independent	Shani Y. Langer	272	3.27	+3.27
Turnout		8,310		
Two-candidate-preferred result
Independent	Sonia Castelli	4,848	58.34	+58.34
Independent	Marlene J. Johnson	3,462	41.66	+41.66
Independent win		(new ward)		

== Glen Eira ==
2020 Victorian local elections: Glen Eira
Party	Votes	%	Seats	Change
Independent	42,373	53.36	5	▲2
Independent Labor	16,474	18.81	3	Steady
Independent Liberal	10,772	13.57	0	▼3
Greens	7,846	8.96	1	Steady
Reason	1,390	1.58	0	Steady
Liberal Democrats	549	0.62	0	Steady
Turnout	87,531	90.67		

=== Camden ===
2020 Victorian local elections: Camden Ward
Party	Candidate	Votes	%	±%
Independent	Sam Parasol	5,277	20.11	+20.11
Greens	David Zyngier	3,515	13.40	+13.40
Independent	Alan Grossbard	3,257	12.41	+12.41
Independent	Simone Zmood	3,008	11.46	+11.46
Independent Liberal	Cameron Simpkins	2,197	8.37	+8.37
Independent Labor	Jane Karslake	2,046	7.80	+7.80
Reason	Ethan Mileikowski	1,390	5.30	+5.30
Independent	Harry Graeve	1,260	4.80	+4.80
Independent	Rachel Iampolski	1,211	4.62	+4.62
Independent Labor	Jesse Dean Mansfield	1,199	4.57	+4.57
Independent Labor	Ricci Steckoll	1,046	3.99	+3.99
Independent	Nellie Khoroshina	456	1.74	+1.74
Independent	Jon Terolli	377	1.44	+1.44
Turnout		27,762	81.26	
Independent gain from Labor		Swing	N/A	
Greens gain from Independent Liberal		Swing	N/A	
Independent gain from Independent		Swing	N/A	

=== Rosstown ===
2020 Victorian local elections: Rosstown Ward
Party	Candidate	Votes	%	±%
Independent	Margaret Esakoff	6,076	22.00	−1.26
Greens	Sue Pennicuik	4,331	15.68	+2.68 (Note: Compared with the results of Greens candidate Clare Davey in 2016.)
Independent Labor	Tony Athanasopoulos	4,149	15.02	+2.21
Independent	Neil Pilling	2,312	8.37	−2.90
Independent Liberal	Simon Balzer	2,082	7.54	+7.54
Independent	John Van Noorden	1,592	5.76	+5.76
Independent	Robert Spaulding	1,576	5.71	+5.71
Independent	Markus Oswald	1,555	5.63	+5.63
Independent	Dev Oza	1,375	4.98	+4.98
Independent Liberal	Kelvin Ho	771	2.79	−1.04
Independent	Con Zois	669	2.42	−1.43
Independent	Gregor Ptok	579	2.10	+2.10
Liberal Democrats	Jack Dariol	549	1.99	+1.99
Turnout		29,246	82.74	
Independent hold		Swing	−1.26	
Independent Labor hold		Swing	+2.21	
Independent gain from Greens		Swing	N/A	

=== Tucker ===
2020 Victorian local elections: Tucker Ward
Party	Candidate	Votes	%	±%
Independent	Anne-Marie Cade	4,396	15.07	+10.69
Independent Labor	Jim Magee	4,123	14.14	+4.26
Independent Labor	Li Zhang	3,911	13.41	+4.01 (Note: Compared with the results of Labor candidate Nina Taylor in 2016.)
Independent Labor	Declan Martin	4,149	12.39	+12.39
Independent Liberal	Joanne Beilby	2,928	10.04	+10.04
Independent	Cristina Santos	2,837	9.73	+9.73
Independent Liberal	Philip Blair De'Ath	2,794	9.58	+3.14
Independent	Neil Brewster	2,665	9.14	+3.00
Independent	Joshua Bach	971	3.33	+3.33
Independent	Jacob Dzialoshinsky	924	3.17	+3.17
Turnout		30,523	85.45	
Independent gain from Independent Liberal		Swing	N/A	
Independent Labor hold		Swing	+4.26	
Independent Labor hold		Swing	+4.01	

== Greater Dandenong ==
The Labor Party did not officially endorse candidates, however 28 party members contested as Dandenong Labor candidates (and a further two contested as Independent Labor without the full endorsement of the other 28).

=== Greater Dandenong results ===
2020 Victorian local elections: Greater Dandenong
Party	Votes	%	Seats	Change
Dandenong Labor	41,714	52.83	8	
Independent	28,358	35.92	1	
Independent Labor	3,817	4.83	0	Steady
Independent Liberal	2,828	3.58	1	
Greens	2,234	2.82	1	Steady
Formal votes	78,951			

=== Cleeland ===
2020 Victorian local elections: Cleeland Ward
Party	Candidate	Votes	%	±%
Dandenong Labor	Angela Long	1,676	26.61	
Independent	Dalibor Saula	1,246	19.78	
Dandenong Labor	Lidia Paul	1,029	16.34	
Independent	Solange Ardiles	792	12.57	
Independent	Madhu Warnakulasuriya	623	9.89	
Dandenong Labor	Hayat Rahimi	603	9.57	
Dandenong Labor	Reza Andesha	330	5.24	
Turnout		6,599	74.78	
Two-candidate-preferred result
Dandenong Labor	Angela Long	3,571	56.69	N/A
Independent	Dalibor Saula	2,728	43.31	N/A
Dandenong Labor win		(new ward)		

=== Dandenong North ===
2020 Victorian local elections: Dandenong North Ward
Party	Candidate	Votes	%	±%
Independent	Bob Milkovic	3,212	40.93	
Dandenong Labor	Zaynoun Melhem	2,891	36.84	
Independent	Gabrielle Maes	1,744	22.23	
Turnout		8,045	85.07	
Two-candidate-preferred result
Independent	Bob Milkovic	4,257	54.25	N/A
Dandenong Labor	Zaynoun Melhem	3,590	45.75	N/A
Independent win		(new ward)		

=== Dandenong ===
2020 Victorian local elections: Dandenong Ward
Party	Candidate	Votes	%	±%
Dandenong Labor	Jim Memeti	3,447	61.16	
Independent	Geraldine Gonsalvez	1,324	23.49	
Independent	Liaqat Khan	470	8.34	
Independent	Naser Fekrat	395	7.01	
Turnout		5,875	72.57	
Dandenong Labor win		(new ward)		

=== Keysborough South ===
2020 Victorian local elections: Keysborough South Ward
Party	Candidate	Votes	%	±%
Greens	Rhonda Garad	2,234	28.27	
Independent Labor	Stephen Fanous	2,015	25.50	
Dandenong Labor	Jessica Halliday	768	9.72	
Independent	Jeruisha Williams	618	7.82	
Dandenong Labor	Ramy El-Sukkari	592	7.49	
Independent	My Dung Phung	424	5.37	
Dandenong Labor	Gam Le	383	4.85	
Independent	Moonsamy Naidoo	303	3.83	
Independent	Thineng Meng	257	3.25	
Independent	Vivekkumar Desai	218	2.76	
Independent	Sandra Seng	89	1.13	
Turnout		8,165	87.32	
Two-candidate-preferred result
Greens	Rhonda Garad	4,282	54.20	N/A
Independent Labor	Stephen Fanous	3,619	45.80	N/A
Greens win		(new ward)		

=== Keysborough ===
2020 Victorian local elections: Keysborough Ward
Party	Candidate	Votes	%	±%
Independent Liberal	Tim Dark	2,828	34.37	
Dandenong Labor	Phillip Danh	2,035	24.73	
Independent	Sheree Samy	1,416	17.21	
Independent	Kun Sok	611	7.42	
Dandenong Labor	Sam Afra	330	4.01	
Independent	Irfan Syed	266	3.23	
Dandenong Labor	Reinaldo Pincheira	231	2.81	
Independent	Eugene Gvozdenko	177	2.15	
Independent	Maria Palmer	176	2.14	
Independent	Neelima Perika	159	1.93	
Turnout		8,519	86.60	
Two-candidate-preferred result
Independent Liberal	Tim Dark	4,159	50.54	N/A
Dandenong Labor	Phillip Danh	4,070	49.46	N/A
Independent Liberal win		(new ward)		

=== Noble Park North ===
2020 Victorian local elections: Noble Park North Ward
Party	Candidate	Votes	%	±%
Dandenong Labor	Lana Formoso	3,124	40.94	
Dandenong Labor	Maria Sampey	1,485	19.46	
Independent	Silvana McMahon	839	11.00	
Dandenong Labor	Pradeep Hewavitharana	763	10.00	
Independent	Brad Woodford	722	9.46	
Dandenong Labor	Nizar Ashkar	697	9.13	
Turnout		7,889	83.26	N/A
After distribution of preferences
Dandenong Labor	Lana Formoso	4,087	53.56	N/A
Dandenong Labor	Maria Sampey	1,877	24.60	N/A
Independent	Silvana McMahon	1,666	21.83	N/A
Dandenong Labor win		(new ward)		

=== Noble Park ===
2020 Victorian local elections: Noble Park Ward
Party	Candidate	Votes	%	±%
Dandenong Labor	Sophie Tan	3,716	49.11	
Independent	Matt Pond	1,269	16.77	
Dandenong Labor	Sue Walton	1,156	15.28	
Independent	Alexander Forbes	825	10.90	
Independent	Yasmin Jugo	601	7.94	
Turnout		7,788	81.74	
After distribution of preferences
Dandenong Labor	Sophie Tan	3,900	51.54	N/A
Independent	Matt Pond	1,517	20.05	N/A
Dandenong Labor	Sue Walton	1,249	16.51	N/A
Independent	Alexander Forbes	901	11.91	N/A
Dandenong Labor win		(new ward)		

=== Springvale Central ===
2020 Victorian local elections: Springvale Central Ward
Party	Candidate	Votes	%	±%
Dandenong Labor	Richard Lim	4,399	59.95	
Dandenong Labor	Minh Van Tranh	1,177	16.04	
Independent	Thi Gam Tran	946	12.89	
Independent	Theresa Huynh	816	11.12	
Turnout		7,530	83.35	
Dandenong Labor win		(new ward)		

=== Springvale North ===
2020 Victorian local elections: Springvale North Ward
Party	Candidate	Votes	%	±%
Dandenong Labor	Sean O'Reilly	3,333	51.55	
Independent	Angela Holl	2,756	42.63	
Dandenong Labor	Ricardo Buensuceso	376	5.82	
Turnout		6,646	80.79	
Dandenong Labor win		(new ward)		

=== Springvale South ===
2020 Victorian local elections: Springvale South Ward
Party	Candidate	Votes	%	±%
Dandenong Labor	Loi Truong	2,651	32.82	
Independent	Leang Vuorch Kong	1,802	22.31	
Independent	William P.J. Billings	1,412	17.48	
Independent	Giorgio Migliaccio	993	12.29	
Dandenong Labor	Thay Horn Yim	981	12.14	
Independent	Suresh Shanmugam	239	2.96	
Turnout		8,261	85.39	
Two-candidate-preferred result
Dandenong Labor	Loi Truong	4,084	50.56	N/A
Independent	Leang Vuorch Kong	3,994	49.44	N/A
Dandenong Labor win		(new ward)		

=== Yarraman ===
2020 Victorian local elections: Yarraman Ward
Party	Candidate	Votes	%	±%
Dandenong Labor	Eden Foster	1,977	33.17	
Independent	Jonathan Ichim	1,359	22.80	
Dandenong Labor	Cam Dang	9.55	9.55	
Dandenong Labor	Ravi Shankar	541	9.08	
Dandenong Labor	Ahmed Shukri	454	7.62	
Independent	Gul Rahman Taniwal	377	6.32	
Independent	Jet Saliu	372	6.24	
Independent	Hengshan Chen	5.23	312	
Turnout		6,257	75.70	
Two-candidate-preferred result
Dandenong Labor	Eden Foster	3,294	55.26	N/A
Independent	Jonathan Ichim	2,667	44.74	N/A
Dandenong Labor win		(new ward)		

==== 2024 Yarraman Ward by-election ====
2024 Yarraman Ward by-election (20 February−8 March 2024)
Party	Candidate	Votes	%	±%
Independent Labor	Phillip Danh	1,189	22.86	
Independent	Peter Brown	888	17.07	
Independent Labor	Alexandra Bryant	499	9.59	
Independent	Melinda Yim	389	7.48	
Independent	Rahima Rizai	363	6.98	
Greens	Robert Lim	332	6.38	
Independent Labor	Zahra Haydarbig	306	5.88	
Independent Liberal	Will Billings	290	5.58	
Independent	Thay-Horn Yim	258	4.96	
Independent	Susantha Abeysinghe	204	3.92	
Independent	Ahmed Shukri	181	3.48	
Victorian Socialists	Tevyn Gov	169	3.25	
Independent Labor	Sam Afra	133	2.56	
Total formal votes		5,201	93.38	
Informal votes		369	6.62	
Turnout		5,570	67.13	
Two-candidate-preferred result
Independent Labor	Phillip Danh	2,654	51.03	
Independent	Peter Brown	2,547	48.97	
Independent Labor hold		Swing		

- By-election held after Eden Foster was elected to the Victorian Parliament.
