= Electoral district of Mulgrave =

Electoral district of Mulgrave may refer to:

- Electoral district of Mulgrave (Queensland), an electoral district of the Legislative Assembly of Queensland
- Electoral district of Mulgrave (Victoria), an electoral district of the Victorian Legislative Assembly
