= 2023 Mulgrave state by-election =

- 18 November 2023

Electoral district of Mulgrave in the Victorian Legislative Assembly
- Registered: 47,142
- Turnout: 80.94% (▼7.5%)

	First party	Second party	Third party
Candidate	Eden Foster	Courtney Mann	Ian Cook
Party	Labor	Liberal	Independent
Primary vote	14,481	7,817	6,780
Percentage	40.18%	21.69%	18.81%
Swing	▼10.82	▲4.50	▲0.80
TCP	56.49%		43.51%
TCP swing	▼4.34		▲4.34
- Results of the by-election by postcode
MP before election
Daniel Andrews
Labor
Elected MP
Eden Foster
Labor

The 2023 Mulgrave state by-election was held on 18 November 2023 to elect the next member for Mulgrave in the Victorian Legislative Assembly, following the resignation of Victorian premier and incumbent MP Daniel Andrews.

== Background ==
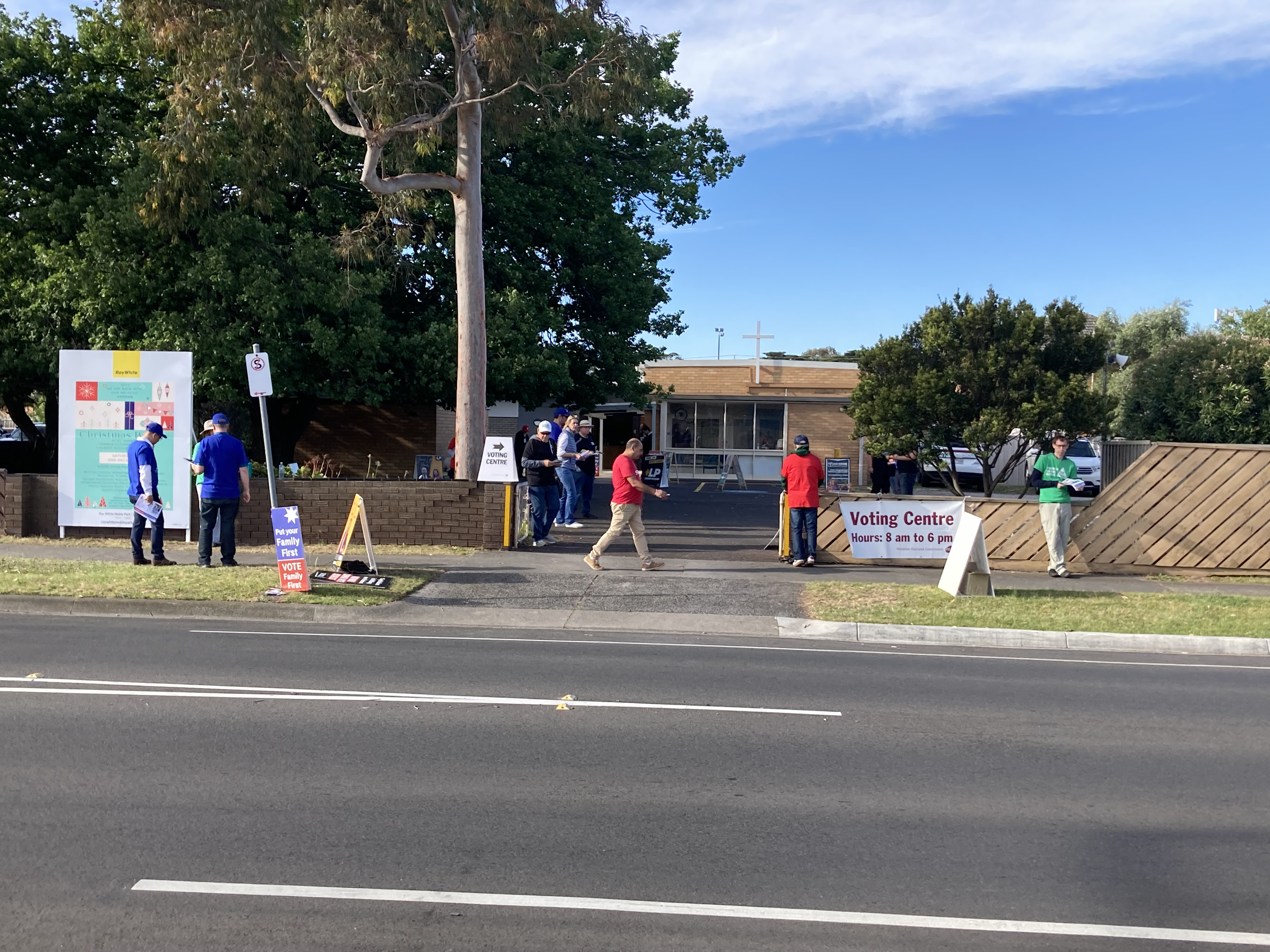
One of the ten polling places for the by-election

=== Resignation of Daniel Andrews ===
At a media conference on 26 September 2023, Daniel Andrews announced his resignation as premier, leader of the Victorian Labor Party, and member for Mulgrave, to take effect the following day. The resignation came exactly 10 months into his four year elected term as member for Mulgrave. He cited thoughts of life following his premiership, which he felt meant "it is time to go".

Following the 2022 Victorian state election, Andrews had committed to govern and remain in parliament for a full four-year term.

=== Seat details ===
Mulgrave has been represented in the Victorian Legislative Assembly on two separate occasions. Its first appearance as an electoral district was during the 1958 Victorian state election, when it was captured by Ray Wiltshire of the Victorian Liberal Party. At the time, Mulgrave was regarded as a secure stronghold for the Liberal Party as its two-party-preferred vote never reached below 60 per cent. Wiltshire continued to serve as the Member of Parliament (MP) for Mulgrave until the 1967 Victorian state election, when the district was abolished. Subsequently, it was replaced by Syndal which Wiltshire represented until his retirement in 1976. The electorate was reestablished at the 2002 Victorian state election, replacing Dandenong North and won by Daniel Andrews who had held the seat up until his resignation in 2023.

=== Demographics ===
At the 2021 Australian census, Mulgrave had a median age of 40, slightly higher than the state and the rest of Australia. The electorate also boasts a significant population with Chinese ancestry comprising 17% of its residents, compared to the state where the rate is 6%. There are also large Vietnamese and Greek communities. Furthermore, 30% of Mulgrave's residents have attained a bachelor's degree or higher, and the median weekly personal income stands at $693.

Two-party-preferred vote in Mulgrave, 2002–2022
Election	2002	2006	2010	2014	2018	2022
Labor	66.20%	65.60%	58.48%	54.50%	62.71%	60.20%
Liberal	33.80%	35.40%	41.52%	45.50%	37.30%	39.80%
Government	ALP	ALP	L/NP	ALP	ALP	ALP

=== 2022 results ===
2022 Victorian state election: Mulgrave
Party	Candidate	Votes	%	±%
Labor	Daniel Andrews	19,365	51.0	−8.5
Independent	Ian Cook	6,838	18.0	+18.0
Liberal	Michael Piastrino	6,528	17.2	−11.0
Greens	Robert Lim	1,930	5.1	−1.3
Freedom	Aidan McLindon	824	2.2	+2.2
Family First	Jane Foreman	749	2.0	+2.0
Animal Justice	David Mould	419	1.1	+0.9
Democratic Labour	Maree Wood	327	0.9	−1.3
Independent	Fotini Theodossopoulou	305	0.8	+0.8
Independent	Andrew King	173	0.4	+0.4
Ind. (PIBCI)	Joseph Toscano	155	0.4	+0.4
Independent	Anne Moody	146	0.4	+0.4
Independent	Howard Lee	120	0.3	+0.3
Independent	Ezra J. D. Isma	92	0.2	+0.2
Total formal votes		37,924	91.2	−2.7
Informal votes		3,650	8.7	+2.7
Turnout		41,574	88.4	+3.3
Notional two-party-preferred count
Labor	Daniel Andrews	22,976	60.2	−5.6
Liberal	Michael Piastrino	15,191	39.8	+5.6
Two-candidate-preferred result
Labor	Daniel Andrews	23,070	60.8	−5.0
Independent	Ian Cook	14,854	39.2	+39.2
Labor hold		Swing	−5.0	

== Candidates ==
Election poster for the Libertarian Party

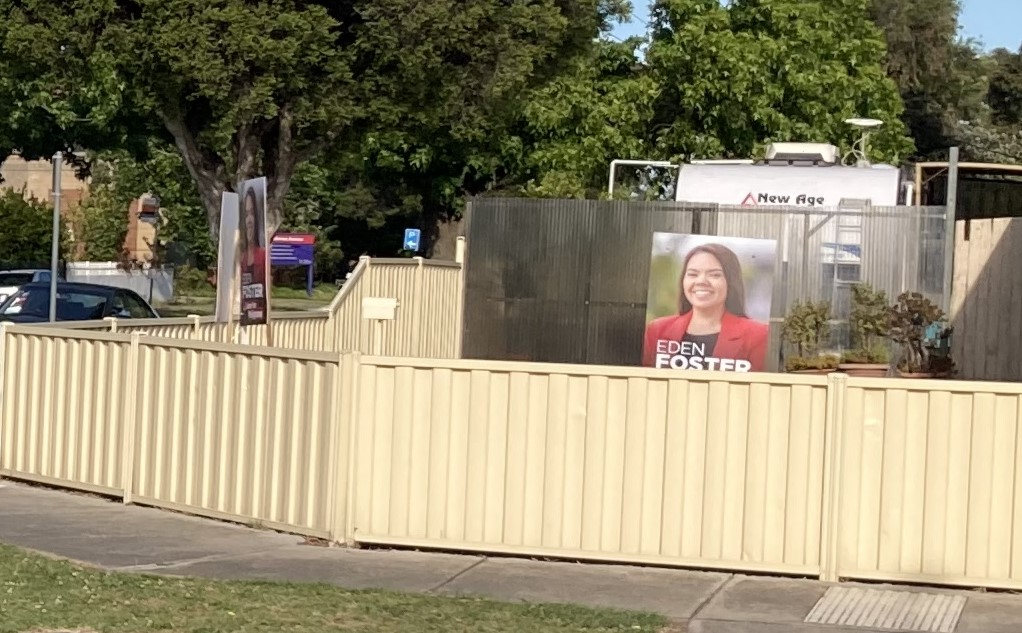
Election poster for the Labor Party

Party	Candidate	Background
Libertarian	Ethelyn King	Candidate for South-East Metro at the 2022 Victorian election.
Sustainable Australia	Celeste Ackerly	Student
Independent	Ian Cook	Former businessman and candidate for Mulgrave at the 2022 Victorian election.
Family First	Jane Foreman	Candidate for Mulgrave at the 2022 Victorian election.
Liberal	Courtney Mann	Political staffer, educator, and candidate for Mulgrave at the 2010 Victorian election.
Victorian Socialists	Kelly Cvetkova	Retail worker, student and candidate for Thomastown at the 2022 Victorian election.
Greens	Rhonda Garad	Greater Dandenong Councillor
Labor	Eden Foster	Mayor of Greater Dandenong
Independent	Tina Theodossopoulou	Landscaper and candidate for Mulgrave at the 2022 Victorian election.
Animal Justice	Bronwyn Currie	Perennial candidate, HR consultant and activist.

== How-to-vote cards ==
Preferences as listed on each parties how to vote card
Party	LBT	SAP	Ian C.	FFV	LIB	VS	GRN	ALP	T.T.	AJ
Libertarian	1		2	4	2	10	7	5	3	6
Sustainable Australia	6	1	3	6	6	5	5	6	6	4
Ian Cook	2		1	3	3	9	8	7	4	9
Family First	3		4	1	4	8	10	8	5	10
Liberal	4		5	5	1	6	6	9	2	7
Victorian Socialists	10		8	9	10	1	3	3	10	2
Greens	8		9	10	9	2	1	2	9	3
Labor	7		10	7	8	4	4	1	8	5
Tina Theodossopoulou	5		6	2	5	7	9	10	1	8
Animal Justice	9		7	8	7	3	2	4	7	1

== Results ==
2023 Mulgrave state by-election
Party	Candidate	Votes	%	±%
Labor	Eden Foster	14,481	40.18	−10.82
Liberal	Courtney Mann	7,817	21.69	+4.50
Independent	Ian Cook	6,780	18.81	+0.80
Greens	Rhonda Garad	2,153	5.97	+0.89
Victorian Socialists	Kelly Cvetkova	1,315	3.65	+3.65
Family First	Jane Foreman	1,111	3.08	+1.11
Libertarian	Ethelyn King	1,046	2.90	+2.90
Independent	Tina Theodossopoulou	662	1.84	+1.04
Animal Justice	Bronwyn Currie	403	1.12	+1.12
Sustainable Australia	Celeste Ackerly	276	0.77	+0.77
Total formal votes		36,044	94.46	+3.13
Informal votes		2,112	5.54	−3.13
Turnout		38,156	80.94	−7.46
Notional two-party-preferred count
Labor	Eden Foster	19,704	54.67	−5.53
Liberal	Courtney Mann	16,340	45.33	+5.53
Two-candidate-preferred result
Labor	Eden Foster	20,363	56.49	−4.34
Independent	Ian Cook	15,681	43.51	+4.34
Labor hold		Swing	−4.34	

== See also ==
- Electoral results for the district of Mulgrave (Victoria)
- 2023 Victorian Labor Party leadership election
- List of Victorian state by-elections
