= City of Greater Dandenong =

- Local government area
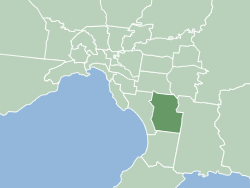
- The City of Greater Dandenong within metropolitan Melbourne

- Interactive map of City of Greater Dandenong
- Coordinates: 37°59′19″S 145°12′48″E
- Country: Australia
- State: Victoria
- Region: Greater Melbourne
- Established: 1994
- Council seat: Dandenong

Government
  - Mayor: Jim Memeti
  - State electorates: Carrum; Clarinda; Dandenong; Mordialloc; Mulgrave
  - Federal divisions: Bruce; Hotham; Isaacs

Area
  - Total: 129.5 km^{2} (50.0 sq mi)

Population
  - Total: 158,208 (2021) (43rd)
  - Density: 1,221.7/km^{2} (3,164.1/sq mi)
- Website: City of Greater Dandenong
LGAs around City of Greater Dandenong
Monash	Monash	Knox
Kingston	City of Greater Dandenong	Casey
Kingston	Frankston	Casey

The City of Greater Dandenong is a local government area in Victoria, Australia in the southeastern suburbs of Melbourne. It has an area of just under 130 square kilometres (50 sq mi) and recorded 158,208 residents at the 2021 census. 29% of its land area forms part of the South East Green Wedge.

The Bunurong/Boon Wurrung and Wurundjeri peoples are the traditional owners and custodians of the land on which Greater Dandenong is now located.

== History ==
In 1994, the state government restructured local government in Victoria. The reforms dissolved 210 councils and created 78 new councils through amalgamations. As part of the reforms, the City of Dandenong and the eastern half of the City of Springvale were merged with industrial parts of the City of Berwick and City of Cranbourne to create the City of Greater Dandenong.

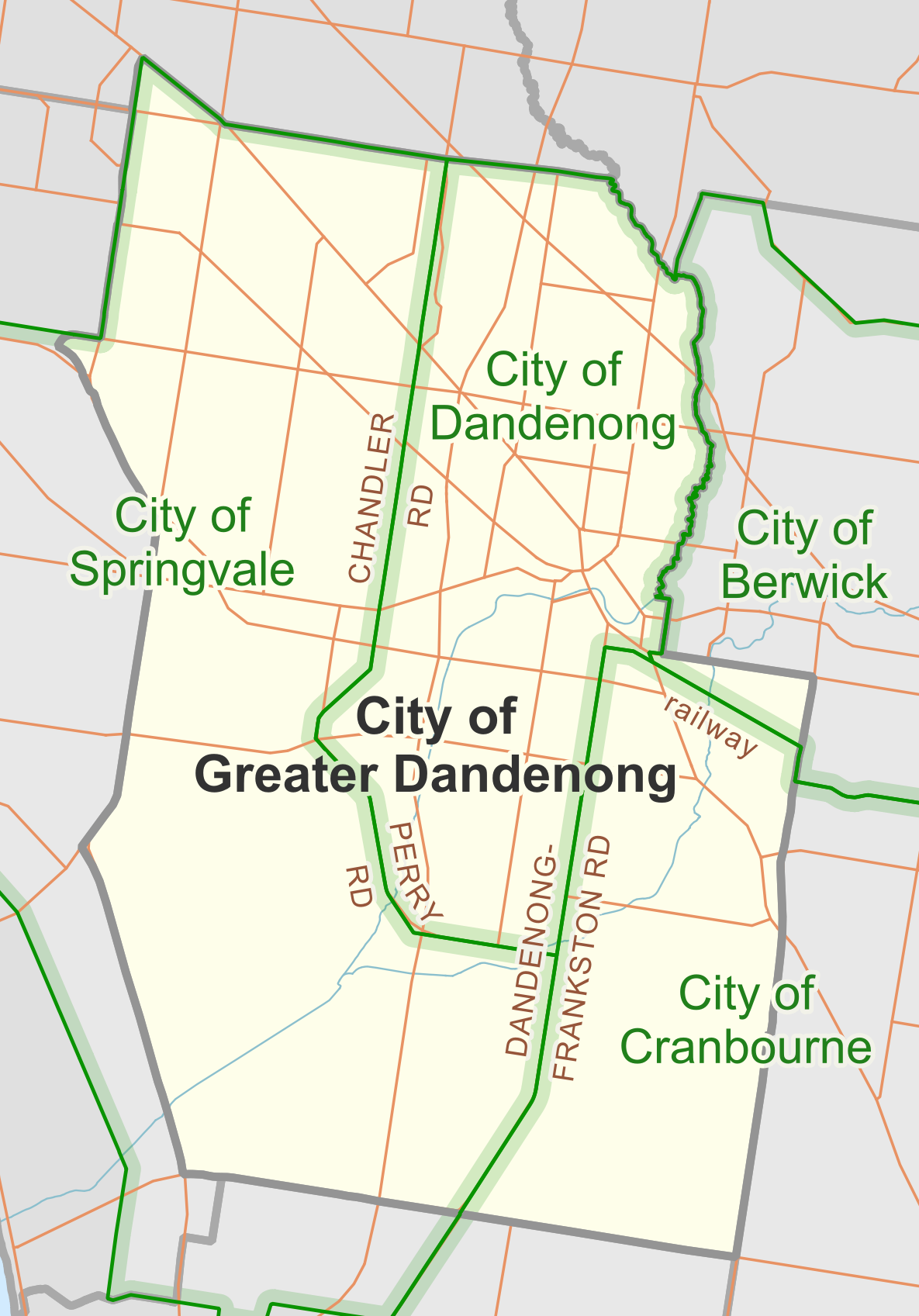
The City's predecessor LGAs (green) as they were in 1994

== Council ==
Greater Dandenong City Council

Leadership
- Mayor: Jim Memeti
- Deputy Mayor: Sophie Tan

Structure
- Council political groups: Labor (7); Independent (3); Greens (1)

Greater Dandenong City Council comprises 11 councillors, elected from single member wards. Prior to 2020, councillors were elected from four wards: Lightwood, Paperbark, Red Gum and Silverleaf. Councillors are elected to fixed-four year terms in a proportional manner using the STV voting system, with each ward electing Councillors based on their respective population.

Elections are held every four years, in accordance with the Local Government Act 1989, with voting being compulsory. Voter turnout figures by the Victorian Electoral Commission show that 81.7% of eligible voters voted at the council election in 2020.

=== Current composition ===
Party	Councillors
Independent Labor	7
Independent	3
Greens	1
Total	11

The composition of Greater Dandenong City Council is one of the most Labor-dominated in the state, demonstrated by its high percentage of councillors who are members of the party and its below-average number of independent councillors. This political membership is reflected through the local federal and state MPs, both of whom are ALP-affiliated. The most recent elections were held on 26 October 2024 and produced the following results:

Ward	Councillor	Party	Notes
Cleeland	Rhonda Garad	Independent	
Dandenong	Jim Memeti	Ind. Labor	Mayor
Dandenong North	Bob Milkovic	Independent	
Keysborough	Melinda Yim	Independent	
Keysborough South	Isabella Do	Greens	
Noble Park	Sophie Tan	Ind. Labor	Deputy Mayor
Noble Park North	Lana Formoso	Ind. Labor	
Springvale Central	Alice Phuong Le	Ind. Labor	
Springvale North	Sean O'Reilly	Ind. Labor	
Springvale South	Loi Truong	Ind. Labor	
Yarraman	Phillip Danh	Ind. Labor	

=== Mayor ===
The mayor is the head of the municipality, leading and coordinating the council's work. The position of mayor is a mostly ceremonial one, expected to represent the City and act as its public spokesperson. The mayor is not entirely a figurehead, however, instead being tasked with chairing council meetings and being involved with a greater number of community events such as citizenship ceremonies.

A mayor is elected among the councillors for a term of one year, meaning that each period between two local government elections usually sees four mayorships. Clare O'Neil became the youngest female mayor in Australian history when she served as mayor of Greater Dandenong from March to November 2004.

== Election results ==
=== 2024 ===
2024 Victorian local elections: Greater Dandenong
Party	Votes	%	Swing	Seats	Change
Independents	31,088	46.04	+10.12	2	▲1
Independent Labor	29,937	44.34	−13.32 (Note: Compared to the combined Dandenong Labor and Independent Labor vote total at the 2020 election.)	7	▼1
Greens	5,728	8.48	+5.66	2	▲1
Victorian Socialists	766	1.13	+1.13	0	Steady
Formal votes	67,519	96.56			
Informal votes	2,405	3.44			
Total	69,924	100.00		11	Steady
Registered voters	93,869				

=== 2020 ===
2020 Victorian local elections: Greater Dandenong
Party	Votes	%	Seats	Change
Dandenong Labor	41,714	52.83	8	
Independent	28,358	35.92	1	
Independent Labor	3,817	4.83	0	Steady
Independent Liberal	2,828	3.58	1	
Greens	2,234	2.82	1	Steady
Formal votes	78,951			

== Past councillors ==
=== 2020−present (11 wards) ===
Year	Cleeland	Dandenong	Dandenong North	Keysborough	Keysborough South	Noble Park	Noble Park North	Springvale Central	Springvale North	Springvale South	Yarraman
Year	Councillor	Councillor	Councillor	Councillor	Councillor	Councillor	Councillor	Councillor	Councillor	Councillor	Councillor
2020	Angela Long (Ind. Labor)	Jim Memeti (Ind. Labor)	Bob Milkovic (Independent)	Tim Dark (Ind. Liberal)	Rhonda Garad (Greens)	Sophie Tan (Ind. Labor)	Lana Formoso (Ind. Labor)	Richard Lim (Ind. Labor)	Sean O'Reilly (Ind. Labor)	Loi Truong (Ind. Labor)	Eden Foster (Ind. Labor)
2024a	Angela Long (Ind. Labor)	Jim Memeti (Ind. Labor)	Bob Milkovic (Independent)	Tim Dark (Ind. Liberal)	Rhonda Garad (Greens)	Sophie Tan (Ind. Labor)	Lana Formoso (Ind. Labor)	Richard Lim (Ind. Labor)	Sean O'Reilly (Ind. Labor)	Loi Truong (Ind. Labor)	Phillip Danh (Ind. Labor)
2024	Rhonda Garad (Greens / Independent)	Jim Memeti (Ind. Labor)	Bob Milkovic (Independent)	Melinda Yim (Independent)	Isabelle Do (Greens)	Sophie Tan (Ind. Labor)	Lana Formoso (Ind. Labor)	Alice Phuong Le (Ind. Labor)	Sean O'Reilly (Ind. Labor)	Loi Truong (Ind. Labor)	Phillip Danh (Ind. Labor)
2025	Rhonda Garad (Greens / Independent)	Jim Memeti (Ind. Labor)	Bob Milkovic (Independent)	Melinda Yim (Independent)	Isabelle Do (Greens)	Sophie Tan (Ind. Labor)	Lana Formoso (Ind. Labor)	Alice Phuong Le (Ind. Labor)	Sean O'Reilly (Ind. Labor)	Loi Truong (Ind. Labor)	Phillip Danh (Ind. Labor)

== Places of interest ==
- Dandenong Market
- Drum Theatre
- Heritage Hill Museum and Historic Gardens
- City of Greater Dandenong Libraries

== Townships and localities ==
The 2021 census, the city had a population of 158,208 up from 152,050 in the 2016 census

Population
Locality	2016	2021
Bangholme	784	749
Dandenong	29,906	30,127
Dandenong North	22,451	22,550
Dandenong South	160	125
Keysborough	25,785	30,018
Lyndhurst^	6,725	8,926
Noble Park	30,998	32,257
Noble Park North	7,468	7,436
Springvale	21,714	22,174
Springvale South	12,768	12,766

^ - Territory divided with another LGA

== Sport ==
The Dandenong Rangers played in the Women's National Basketball League (WNBL) at Dandenong Stadium until being rebranded in 2019. The Rangers won three WNBL championships.

The Dandenong Thunder compete in the Victorian Premier League, playing at George Andrews Reserve. In 2012, the team claimed the famous treble of the Victorian Premier League championship, the Victorian Premier League Minor Premiership, and the Football Federation Victoria State Knockout Cup.

The Greater Dandenong Warriors Hockey Club is based at the Bill Toon Playing fields on Cleeland Road, Dandenong North. The club currently fields four men's teams, one women's team, five junior teams and three master teams.

== Community groups ==
Greater Dandenong has many active community groups.

Service clubs include the Lions Club of Greater Dandenong, the Lions Club of Dandenong, the Lions Club of Dandenong (Supper), the Rotary Club of Dandenong, the Rotary Club of Noble Park and the Rotary Club of Springvale.

== Schools ==
The City of Greater Dandenong has a sister city relationship with Xuzhou, a city in China. Due to this connection, the following schools in Greater Dandenong have established relationships with schools in Xuzhou:

- Wallarano Primary School and Minzulu
- Coomoora Secondary College & Xuzhou No. 3 Middle School
- Springvale Primary School & Xuzhou Arts School
- Maralinga Primary School & Jinshinqaun
- Noble Park English Language School & Xinyi Middle School
- Springvale Secondary College & Xuzhou No.1 Middle School

== Public Libraries ==
- The Greater Dandenong Public Library Service provides library service through two branch libraries: Springvale and Dandenong.

== See also ==
- List of places on the Victorian Heritage Register in the City of Greater Dandenong
