= List of places on the Victorian Heritage Register in the City of Greater Dandenong =

This is a list of places on the Victorian Heritage Register in the City of Greater Dandenong in Victoria, Australia. The Victorian Heritage Register is maintained by the Heritage Council of Victoria.

The Victorian Heritage Register, as of 2021, lists the following two state-registered places within the City of Greater Dandenong:

Place name	Place #	Location	Suburb or Town	Co-ordinates	Built	State registered	Photo
Church of the Resurrection	H2293	402 Corrigan Rd	Keysborough	37.989990°S 145.163050°E	1975-76	13 October 2011	
Sandown Park Racecourse Grandstand	H2391	594-659 Princes Highway	Springvale	37.952220°S 145.163800°E	1960-62	18 April 2019	
