= Results of the 2024 Victorian local elections in South-Eastern Melbourne =

2024 Victorian local elections (South-Eastern Melbourne)
- October 2024

This is a list of results for the 2024 Victorian local elections in the South-Eastern Melbourne region.

South-Eastern Melbourne covers the local government areas (LGAs) of Bayside, Cardinia, Casey, Frankston, Glen Eira, Greater Dandenong, Kingston, Mornington Peninsula and Stonnington.

== Bayside ==
2024 Bayside City Council election
- October 2024

All 7 seats on Bayside City Council 4 seats needed for a majority
| | First party | Second party |
|---|---|---|
| | IND | IND |
| Party | Independent | Ind. Liberal |
| Last election | 7 seats | 0 seats |
| Seats before | 7 | 0 |
| Seats won | 4 seats | 3 seats |
| Seat change | ▼3 | ▲3 |
- 2020 and 2024 ward boundaries. Expand the map and click on a ward to see the ward name
Largest party before election
Independents
Subsequent largest party
Independents

Bayside City Council is composed of seven single-member wards.

=== Bayside results ===
2024 Victorian local elections: Bayside
| Party | Votes | % | Swing | Seats | Change |
|---|---|---|---|---|---|
| Independent | 42,161 | 70.05 | –9.61 | 4 | ▼3 |
| Independent Liberal | 16,975 | 28.20 | +16.97 | 3 | ▲3 |
| Greens | 652 | 1.08 | –6.73 | 0 | Steady |
| Victorian Socialists | 402 | 0.67 | +0.67 | 0 | Steady |
| Formal votes | 60,190 | 94.82 | | | |
| Informal votes | 3,288 | 5.18 | | | |
| Total | 63,478 | 100.00 | | 7 | Steady |
| Registered voters / turnout | 75,633 | 83.93 | | | |

=== Beckett ===
2024 Victorian local elections: Beckett Ward
| Party | Candidate | Votes | % | ±% |
|---|---|---|---|---|
| Independent Liberal | Debbie Taylor-Haynes | 3,337 | 37.78 | |
| Independent | Chris Sutton | 3,130 | 35.44 | |
| Independent | Garry Hoover | 1,553 | 17.58 | |
| Independent | Jess Clark | 812 | 9.19 | |
| Total formal votes | | 8,832 | 97.66 | +0.53 |
| Informal votes | | 212 | 2.34 | –0.53 |
| Turnout | | 9,044 | 86.96 | –1.22 |
Two-candidate-preferred result
| Independent Liberal | Debbie Taylor-Haynes | 4,797 | 54.31 | |
| Independent | Chris Sutton | 4,035 | 45.69 | |
| Independent Liberal gain from Independent | | | | |

=== Bleazby ===
2024 Victorian local elections: Bleazby Ward
| Party | Candidate | Votes | % | ±% |
|---|---|---|---|---|
| Independent Liberal | Robert Irlicht | 2,535 | 27.84 | |
| Independent | Lily Andrews | 1,580 | 17.35 | |
| Independent Liberal | Jenson Galvin | 1,556 | 17.09 | |
| Independent | John Rundell | 1,515 | 16.64 | |
| Independent Liberal | Lyn Maver | 1,189 | 13.06 | |
| Independent | Tony Fischetto | 401 | 4.40 | |
| Independent | Jerry Soldatos | 330 | 3.62 | |
| Total formal votes | | 9,106 | 96.23 | +1.41 |
| Informal votes | | 357 | 3.77 | –1.41 |
| Turnout | | 9,463 | 82.83 | –2.50 |
Two-candidate-preferred result
| Independent Liberal | Robert Irlicht | 5,376 | 59.04 | |
| Independent | Lily Andrews | 3,730 | 40.96 | |
| Independent Liberal gain from Independent | | | | |

=== Boyd ===
2024 Victorian local elections: Boyd Ward
| Party | Candidate | Votes | % | ±% |
|---|---|---|---|---|
| Independent | Kylie McIntosh | 1,973 | 21.54 | +10.25 |
| Independent | Jane Ev Proskurnya | 1,900 | 20.74 | |
| Independent | Fiona Stitfold | 1,471 | 16.06 | –0.40 |
| Independent | Christine Barca | 1,155 | 12.61 | |
| Independent | David Williams | 1,034 | 11.29 | |
| Independent | Faiza Nouman | 868 | 9.48 | |
| Independent Liberal | Nicholas Healey | 758 | 8.28 | −10.26 |
| Total formal votes | | 9,159 | 96.62 | +0.09 |
| Informal votes | | 320 | 3.38 | –0.09 |
| Turnout | | 9,479 | 84.75 | –1.00 |
Two-candidate-preferred result
| Independent | Kylie McIntosh | 5,443 | 59.43 | |
| Independent | Jane Ev Proskurnya | 3,716 | 40.57 | |
| Independent gain from Independent | | Swing | | |

=== Castlefield ===
2024 Victorian local elections: Castlefield Ward
| Party | Candidate | Votes | % | ±% |
|---|---|---|---|---|
| Independent Liberal | Colleen Harkin | 1,820 | 20.31 | |
| Independent | Elli Murray | 1,282 | 14.30 | |
| Independent | Kevin Howard | 1,235 | 13.78 | +6.18 |
| Independent | Tim Wood | 1,202 | 13.41 | +10.60 |
| Independent | Hamish Hughes | 720 | 8.03 | |
| Independent | Toni Armstrong | 398 | 4.44 | |
| Independent | Karen Clements | 375 | 4.18 | |
| Independent | James D. Catlin | 371 | 4.14 | |
| Independent | Bella Irlicht | 315 | 3.51 | |
| Independent | Anne Elizabeth Fitzgerald | 312 | 3.48 | |
| Independent | Jarrod Kanizay | 241 | 2.69 | |
| Independent | Amanda McSweeney | 202 | 2.25 | |
| Independent | Richard Campbell | 191 | 2.13 | |
| Independent | Robyn Buccheri | 160 | 1.79 | |
| Independent Liberal | Penelope Ann Hansen | 138 | 1.54 | |
| Total formal votes | | 8,962 | 92.51 | –3.83 |
| Informal votes | | 726 | 7.49 | +3.83 |
| Turnout | | 9,688 | 83.68 | –2.80 |
Two-candidate-preferred result
| Independent | Elli Murray | 4,651 | 51.90 | |
| Independent Liberal | Colleen Harkin | 4,311 | 48.10 | |
| Independent gain from Independent | | | | |

=== Dendy ===
2024 Victorian local elections: Dendy Ward
| Party | Candidate | Votes | % | ±% |
|---|---|---|---|---|
| Independent | Hanna El Mouallem | 2,592 | 32.53 | +15.00 |
| Independent Liberal | Michael Heffernan | 1,539 | 19.31 | –5.51 |
| Independent Liberal | Thomas Bartels | 380 | 4.77 | |
| Independent | Joshua Goldstat | 366 | 4.59 | –2.93 |
| Independent | Natalie French | 357 | 4.48 | |
| Independent | Lindsey Joffe | 339 | 4.25 | |
| Independent | Alex Nutman | 320 | 4.02 | |
| Independent | Joanne Bryant | 313 | 3.93 | –10.89 |
| Independent | Terence Scanlon | 280 | 3.51 | |
| Independent | Isabella Do Rozario-Romic | 264 | 3.31 | |
| Independent | Ming Min Xu | 235 | 2.95 | |
| Independent | Hugh McFadden | 172 | 2.16 | |
| Independent | Mark Tseytlin | 169 | 2.12 | |
| Independent | David Lurie | 158 | 1.98 | |
| Independent Liberal | Steve Wolf | 137 | 1.72 | |
| Independent | Mike Rawlinson | 132 | 1.66 | |
| Independent | Greg Smith | 119 | 1.49 | |
| Independent | Paras Georgoulos | 97 | 1.22 | |
| Total formal votes | | 7,969 | 92.30 | –4.22 |
| Informal votes | | 665 | 7.70 | +4.22 |
| Turnout | | 8,634 | 80.75 | –2.51 |
Two-candidate-preferred result
| Independent | Hanna El Mouallem | 4,926 | 61.81 | +8.59 |
| Independent Liberal | Michael Heffernan | 3,043 | 38.19 | –8.59 |
| Independent hold | | Swing | +8.59 | |

=== Ebden ===
2024 Victorian local elections: Ebden Ward
| Party | Candidate | Votes | % | ±% |
|---|---|---|---|---|
| Independent Liberal | Geoff Leigh | 2,467 | 30.41 | |
| Independent | Laurence Evans | 1,610 | 19.84 | –11.02 |
| Independent Liberal | Calista Clements | 1,119 | 13.79 | |
| Independent | Clifford Maillard | 727 | 8.96 | –2.73 |
| Independent | Matthew Kaplan | 675 | 8.32 | |
| Independent | Janet Abadee | 653 | 8.05 | |
| Independent | Ian Cochrane | 365 | 4.50 | |
| Independent | Timothy David Watts | 263 | 3.24 | |
| Independent | David Perry | 234 | 2.88 | |
| Total formal votes | | 8,113 | 95.79 | –1.53 |
| Informal votes | | 357 | 4.21 | +1.53 |
| Turnout | | 8,470 | 84.71 | –1.54 |
Two-candidate-preferred result
| Independent Liberal | Geoff Leigh | 4,633 | 57.11 | |
| Independent | Laurence Evans | 3,480 | 42.89 | –17.63 |
| Independent Liberal gain from Independent | | | | |

=== Ivison ===
2024 Victorian local elections: Ivison Ward
| Party | Candidate | Votes | % | ±% |
|---|---|---|---|---|
| Independent | Andrew Hockley | 3,821 | 47.47 | |
| Independent | James Long | 955 | 11.86 | |
| Independent | Sonia Castelli | 833 | 10.35 | –10.32 |
| Greens | Alysia Regan | 652 | 8.10 | −0.99 |
| Independent | Brandon Hoult | 580 | 7.21 | –2.54 |
| Victorian Socialists | Liam Kruger | 402 | 4.99 | |
| Independent | Anastasia Sagris-Desmond | 337 | 4.19 | |
| Independent | Nicholas Batzialas | 311 | 3.86 | |
| Independent | Lyn Austin | 158 | 1.96 | |
| Total formal votes | | 8,049 | 95.48 | –0.64 |
| Informal votes | | 381 | 4.52 | +0.64 |
| Turnout | | 8,430 | 81.40 | –1.76 |
After distribution of preferences
| Independent | Andrew Hockley | 4,109 | 51.05 | |
| Independent | James Long | 1,154 | 14.34 | |
| Independent | Sonia Castelli | 1,055 | 13.11 | |
| Greens | Alysia Regan | 1,002 | 12.45 | |
| Independent | Brandon Hoult | 729 | 9.06 | |
| Independent gain from Independent | | | | |

== Cardinia ==
2024 Cardinia Shire Council election
- October 2024

All 9 seats on Cardinia Shire Council 5 seats needed for a majority
Largest party before election
Independents
Subsequent largest party
Independents

Cardinia Shire Council is composed of nine single-member wards.

On 16 April 2021, Westernport Ward councillor Ray Brown died after a prolonged illness. A by-election was held in 24 July 2021 and was won by Independent Liberal candidate Kaye Cameron.

=== Cardinia results ===
2024 Victorian local elections: Cardinia
| Party | Votes | % | Swing | Seats | Change |
|---|---|---|---|---|---|
| Independent | 39,041 | 67.22 | | 7 | Steady |
| Independent Labor | 9,318 | 16.04 | | 1 | ▼1 |
| Independent Liberal | 4,288 | 7.38 | | 0 | Steady |
| Independent Libertarian | 3,720 | 6.41 | | 1 | ▲1 |
| Greens | 875 | 1.51 | | 0 | Steady |
| Victorian Socialists | 834 | 1.44 | | 0 | Steady |
| Formal votes | 58,076 | 95.75 | | | |
| Informal votes | 2,575 | 4.25 | | | |
| Total | 60,651 | 100.00 | | 9 | Steady |
| Registered voters | 82,745 | | | | |

=== Beacon Hills ===
2024 Victorian local elections: Beacon Hills Ward
| Party | Candidate | Votes | % | ±% |
|---|---|---|---|---|
| Independent | Brett Owen | 6,036 | 76.48 | +10.88 |
| Independent | Kylie Wagstaff | 1,856 | 23.52 | |
| Total formal votes | | 7,892 | 95.46 | –2.52 |
| Informal votes | | 375 | 4.54 | +2.52 |
| Turnout | | 8,267 | 86.31 | –0.20 |
| Independent hold | | | | |

=== Bunyip ===
2024 Victorian local elections: Bunyip Ward
| Party | Candidate | Votes | % | ±% |
|---|---|---|---|---|
| Independent | Alanna Pomeroy | 3,929 | 55.67 | |
| Independent | Travis Parker | 3,129 | 44.33 | |
| Total formal votes | | 7,058 | 95.51 | –1.79 |
| Informal votes | | 332 | 4.49 | +1.79 |
| Turnout | | 7,390 | 83.61 | –0.14 |
| Independent gain from Independent | | | | |

=== Central ===
2024 Victorian local elections: Central Ward
| Party | Candidate | Votes | % | ±% |
|---|---|---|---|---|
| Independent Labor | Collin Ross | 5,519 | 76.61 | +26.31 |
| Independent | Rekha Devdas Naidu | 1,685 | 23.39 | |
| Total formal votes | | 7,204 | 94.94 | –2.06 |
| Informal votes | | 384 | 5.06 | +2.06 |
| Turnout | | 7,588 | 81.50 | +0.88 |
| Independent Labor hold | | | | |

=== Henty ===
2024 Victorian local elections: Henty Ward
| Party | Candidate | Votes | % | ±% |
|---|---|---|---|---|
| Independent | Liz Roberts | 2,550 | 36.51 | |
| Independent Labor | Carol Ryan | 1,735 | 24.84 | +0.52 |
| Independent Liberal | Shoheli Sunjida | 1,083 | 15.51 | |
| Victorian Socialists | Stephanie Grigg | 834 | 11.94 | |
| Independent Labor | Cecilia Rabecca Mphande | 782 | 11.20 | |
| Total formal votes | | 6,984 | 96.29 | +0.19 |
| Informal votes | | 269 | 3.71 | –0.19 |
| Turnout | | 7,253 | 78.39 | +1.22 |
Two-candidate-preferred result
| Independent | Liz Roberts | 4,247 | 60.81 | |
| Independent Labor | Carol Ryan | 2,737 | 39.19 | –16.16 |
| Independent gain from Independent Labor | | | | |

=== Officer ===
2024 Victorian local elections: Officer Ward
| Party | Candidate | Votes | % | ±% |
|---|---|---|---|---|
| Independent | Samantha-Jane Potter | 4,866 | 67.72 | |
| Independent | Ron Malhotra | 2,319 | 32.28 | |
| Total formal votes | | 7,185 | 95.62 | –0.61 |
| Informal votes | | 329 | 4.38 | +0.61 |
| Turnout | | 7,514 | 82.74 | +0.74 |
Two-candidate-preferred result
| Independent gain from Independent | | | | |

=== Pakenham Hills ===
2024 Victorian local elections: Pakenham Hills Ward
| Party | Candidate | Votes | % | ±% |
|---|---|---|---|---|
| Independent | Jack Kowarzik | unopposed | | |
| Registered electors | | 8,719 | | |
| Independent hold | | | | |

=== Ranges ===
2024 Victorian local elections: Ranges Ward
| Party | Candidate | Votes | % | ±% |
|---|---|---|---|---|
| Independent | David Nickell | 2,841 | 37.73 | |
| Independent | Jeff Springfield | 2,732 | 36.29 | |
| Independent | Catherine Oldenburger | 1,956 | 25.98 | |
| Total formal votes | | 7,529 | 96.39 | |
| Informal votes | | 282 | 3.61 | |
| Turnout | | 7,811 | 81.85 | |
Two-candidate-preferred result
| Independent | David Nickell | 4,066 | 54.00 | |
| Independent | Jeff Springfield | 3,463 | 46.00 | |
| Independent gain from Independent | | | | |

=== Toomuc ===
2024 Victorian local elections: Toomuc Ward
| Party | Candidate | Votes | % | ±% |
|---|---|---|---|---|
| Independent | Casey Thomsen | 2,674 | 36.64 | |
| Independent | Stephanie Marie Davies | 2,468 | 33.81 | |
| Independent Labor | Amirthalingam Dhileepan | 1,282 | 17.56 | |
| Greens | Rodrigo Alonso Bardales Salguero | 875 | 11.99 | |
| Total formal votes | | 7,299 | 97.19 | +0.24 |
| Informal votes | | 211 | 2.81 | –0.24 |
| Turnout | | 7,510 | 80.71 | +1.05 |
Two-candidate-preferred result
| Independent | Casey Thomsen | 3,728 | 51.08 | |
| Independent | Stephanie Marie Davies | 3,571 | 48.92 | –1.58 |
| Independent gain from Independent | | | | |

=== Westernport ===
2024 Victorian local elections: Westernport Ward
| Party | Candidate | Votes | % | ±% |
|---|---|---|---|---|
| Independent Libertarian | Trudi Paton | 3,720 | 53.72 | +53.72 |
| Independent Liberal | Kaye Cameron | 3,205 | 46.28 | −14.70 |
| Total formal votes | | 6,925 | 94.63 | +0.22 |
| Informal votes | | 393 | 5.37 | −0.22 |
| Turnout | | 7,318 | 82.71 | +4.76 |
| Independent Libertarian gain from Independent Liberal | | | | |

== Casey ==
2024 Casey City Council election
- October 2024

All 12 seats on Casey City Council 7 seats needed for a majority
Largest party before election
N/A (under administration)
Subsequent largest party
Independents

Casey City Council is composed of twelve single-member wards. The council increased from eleven members to twelve prior to the 2024 election; members were previously elected across six wards (five two-member and one single-member).

This is the first election for the City of Casey since 2016, as the council was dismissed and put into administration in February 2020.

=== Casey results ===
2024 Victorian local elections: Casey
| Party | Votes | % | Seats | Change |
|---|---|---|---|---|
| Independent | 134,110 | 69.62 | 10 | ▲10 |
| Independent Labor | 31,798 | 16.51 | 1 | ▲1 |
| Independent Liberal | 12,082 | 6.27 | 0 | Steady |
| Independent Freedom | 4,623 | 2.40 | 0 | Steady |
| Libertarian | 3,109 | 1.61 | 0 | Steady |
| Independent Libertarian | 2,575 | 1.34 | 0 | Steady |
| Greens | 2,451 | 1.27 | 1 | ▲1 |
| Independent Family First | 1,893 | 0.98 | 0 | Steady |
| Formal votes | 192,641 | 95.93 | | |
| Informal votes | 8,169 | 4.07 | | |
| Total | 200,810 | 100.00 | 12 | ▲1 |
| Registered voters / turnout | 246,948 | 81.32 | | |

=== Akoonah ===
2024 Victorian local elections: Akoonah Ward
| Party | Candidate | Votes | % | ±% |
|---|---|---|---|---|
| Independent Liberal | Samuel Dennison | 4,235 | 25.94 | |
| Independent | Scott William Dowling | 3,603 | 22.07 | |
| Independent | Dianne Pagliuca | 2,774 | 16.99 | |
| Independent | Mush Rahaman | 2,567 | 15.72 | |
| Independent | Kushal Shah | 1,949 | 11.94 | |
| Independent | Patrick R. Ferdinands | 1,201 | 7.36 | |
| Total formal votes | | 16,329 | 97.12 | |
| Informal votes | | 485 | 2.88 | |
| Turnout | | 16,814 | 81.43 | |
Two-candidate-preferred result
| Independent | Scott William Dowling | 8,489 | 51.99 | |
| Independent Liberal | Samuel Dennison | 7,840 | 48.01 | |
| Independent win | | (new ward) | | |

=== Casuarina ===
2024 Victorian local elections: Casuarina Ward
| Party | Candidate | Votes | % | ±% |
|---|---|---|---|---|
| Independent | Kim Ross | 3,494 | 20.75 | |
| Independent | Rex Flannery | 2,011 | 11.94 | |
| Independent Liberal | Lyndon Samuel | 1,927 | 11.44 | |
| Independent Family First | Jane Foreman | 1,893 | 11.24 | |
| Independent | Morteza Ali | 1,844 | 10.95 | |
| Independent | Bassir Qaridi | 1,356 | 8.05 | |
| Independent Labor | Suzanne Carmody | 1,311 | 7.78 | |
| Independent | Rex Lazaros | 1,286 | 7.64 | |
| Independent | Mariam Khaliqy | 1,078 | 6.40 | |
| Independent | Michael Kelaart | 642 | 3.81 | |
| Total formal votes | | 16,842 | 94.43 | |
| Informal votes | | 993 | 5.57 | |
| Turnout | | 17,835 | 80.81 | |
Two-candidate-preferred result
| Independent | Kim Ross | 10,156 | 60.30 | |
| Independent Family First | Jane Foreman | 6,686 | 39.70 | |
| Independent win | | (new ward) | | |

=== Correa ===
2024 Victorian local elections: Correa Ward
| Party | Candidate | Votes | % | ±% |
|---|---|---|---|---|
| Independent | Gary Rowe | 4,961 | 29.50 | |
| Independent Labor | Kanu Aggarwal | 4,193 | 24.93 | |
| Independent | Tracey Ryan | 3,555 | 21.14 | |
| Independent Labor | Abdullah Neshat | 2,148 | 12.77 | |
| Independent | Shegofa Naseri | 1,226 | 7.29 | |
| Independent | Onkar Singh Sandhawalia | 736 | 4.38 | |
| Total formal votes | | 16,819 | 96.20 | |
| Informal votes | | 664 | 3.80 | |
| Turnout | | 17,483 | 79.23 | |
Two-candidate-preferred result
| Independent | Gary Rowe | 9,605 | 57.11 | |
| Independent Labor | Kanu Aggarwal | 7,214 | 42.89 | |
| Independent win | | (new ward) | | |

=== Cranbourne Gardens ===
2024 Victorian local elections: Cranbourne Gardens Ward
| Party | Candidate | Votes | % | ±% |
|---|---|---|---|---|
| Independent | Michelle Crowther | 5,279 | 32.32 | |
| Independent | Anthony Lake | 3,888 | 23.80 | |
| Independent | Tamas Kapitany | 3,013 | 18.45 | |
| Independent | Jo Muir | 1,627 | 9.96 | |
| Independent | Blessing Nhliziyo | 1,315 | 8.05 | |
| Independent | Mary Beth Melton | 1,213 | 7.43 | |
| Total formal votes | | 16,335 | 96.35 | |
| Informal votes | | 619 | 3.65 | |
| Turnout | | 16,954 | 81.84 | |
Two-candidate-preferred result
| Independent | Michelle Crowther | 9,469 | 57.97 | |
| Independent | Anthony Lake | 6,866 | 42.03 | |
| Independent win | | (new ward) | | |

=== Dillwynia ===
2024 Victorian local elections: Dillwynia Ward
| Party | Candidate | Votes | % | ±% |
|---|---|---|---|---|
| Independent | Anthony Walter | 3,233 | 21.69 | |
| Independent | Joe Pang | 2,519 | 16.90 | |
| Independent | David Bissell | 1,974 | 13.24 | |
| Independent | Gurpreet Gill | 1,836 | 12.32 | |
| Independent | Baljinder Dhaliwal | 1,535 | 10.30 | |
| Independent Liberal | Jaz Masuta Kamaljeet Singh | 1,445 | 9.69 | |
| Independent | Anthony Dissanayake | 1,376 | 9.23 | |
| Independent | Champika Hewa Maddumage | 990 | 6.64 | |
| Total formal votes | | 14,908 | 95.85 | |
| Informal votes | | 645 | 4.15 | |
| Turnout | | 15,553 | 82.28 | |
Two-candidate-preferred result
| Independent | Anthony Walter | 8,246 | 55.33 | |
| Independent | Joe Pang | 6,659 | 44.67 | |
| Independent win | | (new ward) | | |

=== Grevillea ===
2024 Victorian local elections: Grevillea Ward
| Party | Candidate | Votes | % | ±% |
|---|---|---|---|---|
| Independent | Carmen Powell | 3,074 | 17.83 | |
| Independent Liberal | John Ternel | 2,809 | 16.29 | |
| Independent Libertarian | Stephen Matulec | 2,575 | 14.93 | |
| Greens | Dave Perry | 2,451 | 14.21 | |
| Independent | Bernie Postma | 2,145 | 12.44 | |
| Independent Labor | David Parr | 1,685 | 9.77 | |
| Independent | Stephen Capon | 1,307 | 7.58 | |
| Independent | Haroon Sayed | 620 | 3.60 | |
| Independent | Sinfree Chirunga | 578 | 3.35 | |
| Total formal votes | | 17,244 | 95.55 | |
| Informal votes | | 804 | 4.45 | |
| Turnout | | 18,048 | 83.95 | |
Two-candidate-preferred result
| Greens | Dave Perry | 8,758 | 50.79 | |
| Independent | Carmen Powell | 8,486 | 49.21 | |
| Greens win | | (new ward) | | |

=== Kalora ===
2024 Victorian local elections: Kalora Ward
| Party | Candidate | Votes | % | ±% |
|---|---|---|---|---|
| Independent | Melinda Ambros | 3,933 | 23.56 | |
| Independent | Brian Herbert Oates | 2,652 | 15.89 | |
| Independent | Damien Sawyer | 2,326 | 13.93 | |
| Independent | Zabi Mazoori | 2,259 | 13.53 | |
| Independent Liberal | Jafri Katagara Luwanga | 1,666 | 9.98 | |
| Independent | Duc Nguyen | 1,196 | 7.16 | |
| Independent | Peterine Smulders | 1,108 | 6.64 | |
| Independent | Fred Jover | 817 | 4.89 | |
| Independent | Afroz Ahmed | 736 | 4.41 | |
| Total formal votes | | 16,693 | 95.20 | |
| Informal votes | | 842 | 4.80 | |
| Turnout | | 17,535 | 83.17 | |
Two-candidate-preferred result
| Independent | Melinda Ambros | 9,444 | 56.57 | |
| Independent | Damien Sawyer | 7,249 | 43.43 | |
| Independent win | | (new ward) | | |

=== Kowan ===
2024 Victorian local elections: Kowan Ward
| Party | Candidate | Votes | % | ±% |
|---|---|---|---|---|
| Independent Labor | Kasuni Mendis | 3,490 | 21.53 | |
| Independent | Bernard Brian Carr | 3,139 | 19.37 | |
| Libertarian | Christine Skrobo | 3,109 | 19.18 | |
| Independent | Shane Taylor | 3,061 | 18.89 | |
| Independent | Jawad Erfani | 1,358 | 8.38 | |
| Independent | Joby George | 921 | 5.68 | |
| Independent | Gagan Bumrah | 622 | 3.84 | |
| Independent Labor | Raj Nayak (Note: Member of the Labor Party and also "affiliated" with the Greens.) | 508 | 3.13 | |
| Total formal votes | | 16,208 | 96.45 | |
| Informal votes | | 597 | 3.55 | |
| Turnout | | 16,805 | 84.12 | |
Two-candidate-preferred result
| Independent | Shane Taylor | 8,470 | 52.26 | |
| Independent Labor | Kasuni Mendis | 7,738 | 47.74 | |
| Independent win | | (new ward) | | |

=== Quarters ===
2024 Victorian local elections: Quarters Ward
| Party | Candidate | Votes | % | ±% |
|---|---|---|---|---|
| Independent | Carolyn Eaves | 3,092 | 20.05 | |
| Independent | Ian Wood | 2,799 | 18.15 | |
| Independent Freedom | Craig Baird | 2,343 | 15.19 | |
| Independent | Kuljeet Kaur Robinson | 2,046 | 13.27 | |
| Independent Labor | Aftab Hussain | 2,043 | 13.25 | |
| Independent | Jagdeep Singh Sukhija | 1,730 | 11.22 | |
| Independent | David Rolfe | 1,037 | 6.72 | |
| Independent | Ridvan Rasimi | 334 | 2.17 | |
| Total formal votes | | 15,424 | 96.16 | |
| Informal votes | | 616 | 3.84 | |
| Turnout | | 16,040 | 79.63 | |
Two-candidate-preferred result
| Independent | Carolyn Eaves | 8,517 | 55.22 | |
| Independent | Ian Wood | 6,907 | 44.78 | |
| Independent win | | (new ward) | | |

=== River Gum ===
2024 Victorian local elections: River Gum Ward
| Party | Candidate | Votes | % | ±% |
|---|---|---|---|---|
| Independent | Lynette Pereira | 3,691 | 24.41 | |
| Independent Labor | Wayne Smith | 2,535 | 16.77 | |
| Independent | Nazir Yousafi | 2,351 | 15.55 | |
| Independent Freedom | Geoff Hansen | 2,280 | 15.08 | |
| Independent | Asher Coleman | 2,111 | 13.96 | |
| Independent | Damien Rosario | 1,117 | 7.39 | |
| Independent Labor | Garry Page | 1,033 | 6.83 | |
| Total formal votes | | 15,118 | 96.10 | |
| Informal votes | | 614 | 3.90 | |
| Turnout | | 15,732 | 80.27 | |
Two-candidate-preferred result
| Independent | Lynette Pereira | 8,551 | 56.56 | |
| Independent Freedom | Geoff Hansen | 6,567 | 43.44 | |
| Independent win | | (new ward) | | |

=== Tooradin ===
2024 Victorian local elections: Tooradin Ward
| Party | Candidate | Votes | % | ±% |
|---|---|---|---|---|
| Independent | Jennifer Dizon | 4,164 | 26.45 | |
| Independent | Anthony Tassone | 4,123 | 26.19 | |
| Independent | Kuldeep Kaur | 1,995 | 12.67 | |
| Independent Labor | Andrew Gai | 1,952 | 12.40 | |
| Independent Labor | Yaghobi Ali | 1,474 | 9.36 | |
| Independent | Brenton Kelly | 1,407 | 8.94 | |
| Independent Labor | Ravneet Singh | 626 | 3.98 | |
| Total formal votes | | 15,741 | 96.49 | |
| Informal votes | | 573 | 3.51 | |
| Turnout | | 16,314 | 81.06 | |
Two-candidate-preferred result
| Independent | Jennifer Dizon | 8,597 | 54.62 | |
| Independent | Anthony Tassone | 7,144 | 45.38 | |
| Independent win | | (new ward) | | |

=== Waratah ===
2024 Victorian local elections: Waratah Ward
| Party | Candidate | Votes | % | ±% |
|---|---|---|---|---|
| Independent Labor | Stefan Koomen | 6,481 | 43.26 | |
| Independent | Jamel Kaur Singh | 3,245 | 21.66 | |
| Independent | Nasser Yawari | 2,352 | 15.70 | |
| Independent Labor | Ezatullah Alam | 1,959 | 13.08 | |
| Independent | Burak Dilbaz | 943 | 6.30 | |
| Total formal votes | | 14,980 | 95.43 | |
| Informal votes | | 717 | 4.57 | |
| Turnout | | 15,697 | 78.19 | |
After distribution of preferences
| Independent Labor | Stefan Koomen | 7,660 | 51.13 | |
| Independent | Jamel Kaur Singh | 3,961 | 26.44 | |
| Independent | Nasser Yawari | 3,359 | 22.42 | |
| Independent Labor win | | (new ward) | | |

== Frankston ==
2024 Frankston City Council election
- October 2024

All 9 seats on Frankston City Council 5 seats needed for a majority
Largest party before election
Independents
Subsequent largest party
Independents

Frankston City Council is composed of nine single-member wards. Prior to the 2024 election, it was composed of three multi-member wards with three members each, but the electoral structure has changed as a result of the Local Government Act 2020.

=== Frankston results ===
2024 Victorian local elections: Frankston
| Party | Votes | % | Swing | Seats | Change |
|---|---|---|---|---|---|
| Independent | 52,315 | 66.88 | | 5 | ▼1 |
| Independent Liberal | 15,299 | 19.56 | | 2 | Steady |
| Independent Labor | 3,972 | 5.08 | | 1 | Steady |
| Greens | 2,140 | 2.74 | | 1 | ▲1 |
| Ind. Sustainable Australia | 2,013 | 2.57 | | 0 | Steady |
| Independent Libertarian | 1,724 | 2.20 | | 0 | Steady |
| Victorian Socialists | 749 | 0.96 | | 0 | Steady |
| Formal votes | 78,212 | 96.88 | | | |
| Informal votes | 2,522 | 3.12 | | | |
| Total | 80,734 | 100.00 | | 9 | Steady |
| Registered voters / turnout | 101,147 | 79.82 | | | |

=== Ballam ===
2024 Victorian local elections: Ballam Ward
| Party | Candidate | Votes | % | ±% |
|---|---|---|---|---|
| Independent | Kris Bolam | 3,852 | 43.09 | |
| Independent | Adam Marshal | 1,846 | 20.65 | |
| Independent | Steven Hughes | 1,624 | 18.17 | |
| Independent | Cristy Solis | 1,618 | 18.10 | |
| Total formal votes | | 8,940 | 97.11 | |
| Informal votes | | 266 | 2.89 | |
| Turnout | | 9,206 | 77.12 | |
After distribution of preferences
| Independent | Kris Bolam | 4,778 | 53.45 | |
| Independent | Adam Marshal | 2,182 | 24.41 | |
| Independent | Steven Hughes | 1,980 | 22.15 | |
| Independent win | | (new ward) | | |

=== Centenary Park ===
2024 Victorian local elections: Centenary Park Ward
| Party | Candidate | Votes | % | ±% |
|---|---|---|---|---|
| Independent Liberal | Michael O'Reilly | 4,313 | 47.96 | |
| Independent | Maureen Rodgers | 2,254 | 25.07 | |
| Independent Liberal | Shane Osborne | 1,676 | 18.64 | |
| Victorian Socialists | Andrew Cheeseman | 749 | 8.33 | |
| Total formal votes | | 8,992 | 96.97 | |
| Informal votes | | 281 | 3.03 | |
| Turnout | | 9,273 | 82.89 | |
Two-candidate-preferred result
| Independent Liberal | Michael O'Reilly | 5,478 | 60.92 | |
| Independent | Maureen Rodgers | 3,514 | 39.08 | |
| Independent Liberal win | | (new ward) | | |

=== Derinya ===
2024 Victorian local elections: Derinya Ward
| Party | Candidate | Votes | % | ±% |
|---|---|---|---|---|
| Independent Labor | Brad Hill | 2,417 | 26.62 | |
| Independent | Liam Hughes | 1,889 | 20.81 | |
| Independent | Hans Vanderstadt | 1,706 | 18.79 | |
| Independent | Cassandra Grace | 1,285 | 14.15 | |
| Independent | Ashleigh Hoult | 1,236 | 13.61 | |
| Independent | Iva Babic | 546 | 6.01 | |
| Total formal votes | | 9,079 | 96.74 | |
| Informal votes | | 306 | 3.26 | |
| Turnout | | 9,385 | 82.62 | |
Two-candidate-preferred result
| Independent Labor | Brad Hill | 5,201 | 57.29 | |
| Independent | Liam Hughes | 3,878 | 42.71 | |
| Independent Labor win | | (new ward) | | |

=== Elisabeth Murdoch ===
2024 Victorian local elections: Elisabeth Murdoch Ward
| Party | Candidate | Votes | % | ±% |
|---|---|---|---|---|
| Independent | Cherie Wanat | 3,951 | 40.92 | |
| Independent | Stephen McDonald | 2,423 | 25.10 | |
| Independent Libertarian | Chrysten Abraham | 1,724 | 17.86 | |
| Independent | Suzette Tayler | 1,202 | 12.45 | |
| Independent Labor | Henryk Kay | 355 | 3.68 | |
| Independent | Renee Jackson (ineligible) (Note: Candidate was ineligible to contest the election after not completing mandatory candidate training. They still appeared on the ballot as they were only "retired" by the Victorian Electoral Commission after ballot papers had been printed, however they could not serve as a councillor and their votes were distributed to other candidates according to voters' preferences.) | N/A | N/A | |
| Total formal votes | | 9,655 | 96.63 | |
| Informal votes | | 337 | 3.37 | |
| Turnout | | 9,992 | 84.53 | |
Two-candidate-preferred result
| Independent | Cherie Wanat | 6,007 | 62.22 | |
| Independent | Stephen McDonald | 3,648 | 37.78 | |
| Independent win | | (new ward) | | |

=== Kananook ===
2024 Victorian local elections: Kananook Ward
| Party | Candidate | Votes | % | ±% |
|---|---|---|---|---|
| Greens | Emily Green | 2,140 | 27.43 | |
| Independent | Glenn Aitken | 1,999 | 25.62 | |
| Independent | Lisa Stark | 1,602 | 20.53 | |
| Independent | Nathan Pither | 1,358 | 17.41 | |
| Independent | Trent Stagg | 703 | 9.01 | |
| Total formal votes | | 7,802 | 97.14 | |
| Informal votes | | 230 | 2.86 | |
| Turnout | | 8,032 | 75.60 | |
Two-candidate-preferred result
| Greens | Emily Green | 4,192 | 53.73 | |
| Independent | Glenn Aitken | 3,610 | 46.27 | |
| Greens win | | (new ward) | | |

=== Lyrebird ===
2024 Victorian local elections: Lyrebird Ward
| Party | Candidate | Votes | % | ±% |
|---|---|---|---|---|
| Independent Liberal | Steffie Conroy | 3,385 | 38.93 | |
| Independent | Sam Keats | 2,907 | 33.43 | |
| Independent Liberal | Nathan Havis | 2,403 | 27.64 | |
| Total formal votes | | 8,695 | 96.57 | |
| Informal votes | | 309 | 3.43 | |
| Turnout | | 9,004 | 79.51 | |
Two-candidate-preferred result
| Independent Liberal | Steffie Conroy | 4,537 | 52.18 | |
| Independent | Sam Keats | 4,158 | 47.82 | |
| Independent Liberal win | | (new ward) | | |

=== Pines ===
2024 Victorian local elections: Pines Ward
| Party | Candidate | Votes | % | ±% |
|---|---|---|---|---|
| Independent | Sue Baker | 2,708 | 36.39 | |
| Independent Liberal | Justin Turner | 2,288 | 30.75 | |
| Independent | Bernadette Graus | 1,245 | 16.73 | |
| Independent Labor | Quinney Brownfield-Hanna | 1,200 | 16.13 | |
| Total formal votes | | 7,441 | 96.64 | |
| Informal votes | | 259 | 3.36 | |
| Turnout | | 7,700 | 73.88 | |
Two-candidate-preferred result
| Independent | Sue Baker | 4,266 | 57.33 | |
| Independent Liberal | Justin Turner | 3,175 | 42.67 | |
| Independent win | | (new ward) | | |

=== Wilton ===
2024 Victorian local elections: Wilton Ward
| Party | Candidate | Votes | % | ±% |
|---|---|---|---|---|
| Independent | David Asker | 3,976 | 42.93 | |
| Independent | Annaliese Collison | 3,127 | 33.77 | |
| Independent Liberal | Prasad Philip | 1,234 | 13.32 | |
| Independent | Richard Rendell | 924 | 9.98 | |
| Total formal votes | | 9,261 | 97.29 | |
| Informal votes | | 258 | 2.71 | |
| Turnout | | 9,519 | 82.31 | |
Two-candidate-preferred result
| Independent | David Asker | 5,004 | 54.03 | |
| Independent | Annaliese Collison | 4257 | 45.97 | |
| Independent win | | (new ward) | | |

=== Yamala ===
2024 Victorian local elections: Yamala Ward
| Party | Candidate | Votes | % | ±% |
|---|---|---|---|---|
| Independent | Nathan Butler | 2,986 | 35.77 | |
| Ind. Sustainable Australia | Sheila Newman | 2,013 | 24.12 | |
| Independent | Alistair Wardle | 1,526 | 18.28 | |
| Independent | Garry Ebbott | 1,040 | 12.46 | |
| Independent | Steve Toms | 782 | 9.37 | |
| Independent | Ben Frawley (ineligible) | N/A | N/A | |
| Total formal votes | | 8,347 | 96.80 | |
| Informal votes | | 276 | 3.20 | |
| Turnout | | 8,623 | 79.07 | |
Two-candidate-preferred result
| Independent | Nathan Butler | 5,161 | 61.83 | |
| Ind. Sustainable Australia | Sheila Newman | 3,186 | 38.17 | |
| Independent win | | (new ward) | | |

== Glen Eira ==
2024 Glen Eira City Council election
- October 2024

All 9 seats on Glen Eira City Council 5 seats needed for a majority
Largest party before election
No overall control
Subsequent largest party
Independents

Glen Eira City Council is composed of nine single-member wards. Prior to the 2024 election, it was composed of three multi-member wards with three members each, but the electoral structure has changed as a result of the Local Government Act 2020.

=== Glen Eira results ===
2024 Victorian local elections: Glen Eira
| Party | Votes | % | Swing | Seats | Change |
|---|---|---|---|---|---|
| Independent | 57,980 | 68.75 | +15.39 | 6 | ▲1 |
| Independent Labor | 16,205 | 19.78 | +0.97 | 3 | Steady |
| Greens | 4,253 | 5.19 | –3.77 | 0 | ▼1 |
| Independent Liberal | 1,647 | 2.01 | –11.56 | 0 | Steady |
| Libertarian | 1,060 | 1.29 | +0.67 | 0 | Steady |
| Victorian Socialists | 785 | 0.96 | +0.96 | 0 | Steady |
| Formal votes | 81,930 | 97.15 | +2.31 | | |
| Informal votes | 2,407 | 2.85 | –2.31 | | |
| Total | 84,337 | 100.00 | | 9 | Steady |
| Registered voters / turnout | 102,201 | 82.52 | –0.66 | | |

=== Bambra ===
2024 Victorian local elections: Bambra Ward
| Party | Candidate | Votes | % | ±% |
|---|---|---|---|---|
| Independent | Margaret Esakoff | 3,542 | 38.25 | |
| Independent | Catherine McNaughton | 1,621 | 17.51 | |
| Independent | Shane Shmuel | 1,418 | 15.31 | |
| Independent Labor | Max Gross | 1,137 | 12.28 | |
| Independent | Anouchkar Caderamanpulle | 721 | 7.79 | |
| Independent Liberal | Richard Codron | 456 | 4.92 | |
| Independent | Elen David | 364 | 3.93 | |
| Total formal votes | | 9,259 | 96.95 | |
| Informal votes | | 291 | 3.05 | |
| Turnout | | 9,550 | 82.78 | |
Two-candidate-preferred result
| Independent | Margaret Esakoff | 5,715 | 61.72 | |
| Independent | Shane Shmuel | 3,544 | 38.28 | |
| Independent win | | (new ward) | | |

=== Booran ===
2024 Victorian local elections: Booran Ward
| Party | Candidate | Votes | % | ±% |
|---|---|---|---|---|
| Independent Labor | Jane Karslake | 3,056 | 34.11 | |
| Independent | Anne-Marie Cade | 2,992 | 33.40 | |
| Independent | Cliff Carp | 1,174 | 13.10 | |
| Independent Labor | Meg Lyell | 914 | 10.20 | |
| Independent | Jeremy Koadlow | 823 | 9.19 | |
| Total formal votes | | 8,959 | 97.19 | |
| Informal votes | | 259 | 2.81 | |
| Turnout | | 9,218 | 82.45 | |
Two-candidate-preferred result
| Independent Labor | Jane Karslake | 4,591 | 51.24 | |
| Independent | Anne-Marie Cade | 4,368 | 48.76 | |
| Independent Labor win | | (new ward) | | |

=== Caulfield Park ===
2024 Victorian local elections: Caulfield Park Ward
| Party | Candidate | Votes | % | ±% |
|---|---|---|---|---|
| Independent | Sam Parasol | 5,154 | 56.66 | |
| Independent | Victor Deng | 1,658 | 18.23 | |
| Victorian Socialists | Jaynaya Travis | 785 | 8.63 | |
| Independent | Tammy Graeve | 759 | 8.34 | |
| Independent Labor | James Steedman | 740 | 8.14 | |
| Total formal votes | | 9,096 | 97.95 | |
| Informal votes | | 190 | 2.05 | |
| Turnout | | 9,286 | 79.55 | |
| Independent win | | (new ward) | | |

=== Jasper ===
2024 Victorian local elections: Jasper Ward
| Party | Candidate | Votes | % | ±% |
|---|---|---|---|---|
| Independent | Arabella Daniel | 4,582 | 48.95 | |
| Independent | Josh Lobo | 3,600 | 38.46 | |
| Independent | J. Han | 1,178 | 12.59 | |
| Total formal votes | | 9,360 | 97.42 | |
| Informal votes | | 248 | 2.58 | |
| Turnout | | 9,608 | 84.18 | |
Two-candidate-preferred result
| Independent | Arabella Daniel | 5,168 | 55.21 | |
| Independent | Josh Lobo | 4,192 | 44.79 | |
| Independent win | | (new ward) | | |

=== Mallanbool ===
2024 Victorian local elections: Mallanbool Ward
| Party | Candidate | Votes | % | ±% |
|---|---|---|---|---|
| Independent | Kimberley Young | 4,037 | 43.31 | |
| Independent Labor | Jim Magee | 3,230 | 34.65 | |
| Independent | Nick Palamaras | 1,391 | 14.92 | |
| Independent | Robert Breda | 663 | 7.11 | |
| Total formal votes | | 9,321 | 97.49 | |
| Informal votes | | 240 | 2.51 | |
| Turnout | | 9,561 | 84.98 | |
Two-candidate-preferred result
| Independent | Kimberley Young | 5,306 | 56.93 | |
| Independent Labor | Jim Magee | 4,015 | 43.07 | |
| Independent win | | (new ward) | | |

=== Moorleigh ===
2024 Victorian local elections: Moorleigh Ward
| Party | Candidate | Votes | % | ±% |
|---|---|---|---|---|
| Independent | Kay Rimbaldo | 6,554 | 71.50 | |
| Independent | Karen Nisbet | 2,612 | 28.50 | |
| Total formal votes | | 9,166 | 95.44 | |
| Informal votes | | 438 | 4.56 | |
| Turnout | | 9,604 | 84.06 | |
| Independent win | | (new ward) | | |

=== Murrumbeena ===
2024 Victorian local elections: Murrumbeena Ward
| Party | Candidate | Votes | % | ±% |
|---|---|---|---|---|
| Independent Labor | Luca Ragni | 2,828 | 31.00 | |
| Independent | Neil Pilling | 2,704 | 29.64 | |
| Greens | Callum Bugbird | 1,830 | 20.06 | |
| Libertarian | Matthew Aitken | 1,060 | 11.62 | |
| Independent | Edward Kreymer | 702 | 7.69 | |
| Total formal votes | | 9,124 | 97.42 | |
| Informal votes | | 242 | 2.58 | |
| Turnout | | 9,366 | 82.49 | |
Two-candidate-preferred result
| Independent Labor | Luca Ragni | 4,880 | 53.49 | |
| Independent | Neil Pilling | 4,244 | 46.51 | |
| Independent Labor win | | (new ward) | | |

=== Orrong ===
2024 Victorian local elections: Orrong Ward
| Party | Candidate | Votes | % | ±% |
|---|---|---|---|---|
| Greens | Sue Pennicuik | 2,423 | 28.29 | |
| Independent | Simone Zmood | 2,236 | 26.11 | |
| Independent | Yossi Salamon | 1,991 | 23.25 | |
| Independent Labor | Mike Craig | 1,281 | 14.96 | |
| Independent | Lily Steiner | 634 | 7.40 | |
| Total formal votes | | 8,565 | 97.56 | |
| Informal votes | | 214 | 2.44 | |
| Turnout | | 8,779 | 78.14 | |
Two-candidate-preferred result
| Independent | Simone Zmood | 4,670 | 54.52 | |
| Greens | Sue Pennicuik | 3,895 | 45.48 | |
| Independent win | | (new ward) | | |

=== Wattle Grove ===
2024 Victorian local elections: Wattle Grove Ward
| Party | Candidate | Votes | % | ±% |
|---|---|---|---|---|
| Independent Labor | Li Zhang | 3,019 | 33.25 | |
| Independent | Angus Morrison | 1,442 | 15.88 | |
| Independent | Eric Stone | 1,390 | 15.31 | |
| Independent Liberal | Mish-elle Korn | 1,191 | 13.12 | |
| Independent | Angie Glance | 1,054 | 11.61 | |
| Independent | Emiko Hunt | 504 | 5.55 | |
| Independent | Kenneth Law | 480 | 5.29 | |
| Total formal votes | | 9,080 | 96.96 | |
| Informal votes | | 285 | 3.04 | |
| Turnout | | 9,365 | 84.11 | |
Two-candidate-preferred result
| Independent Labor | Li Zhang | 5,290 | 58.26 | |
| Independent | Angus Morrison | 3,790 | 41.74 | |
| Independent Labor win | | (new ward) | | |

== Greater Dandenong ==
2024 Greater Dandenong City Council election
- 26 October 2024

All 11 seats on Greater Dandenong City Council 6 seats needed for a majority
| | First party | Second party | Third party |
|---|---|---|---|
| | IND | IND |
| Party | Independents | Ind. Labor | Greens |
| Last election | 1 seat | 8 seats | 1 seat |
| Seats before | 1 | 8 | 1 |
| Seats won | 2 | 7 | 2 |
| Seat change | ▲1 | ▼1 | ▲1 |
| First preference vote | 31,088 | 29,937 | 5,728 |
| Percentage | 46.04% | 44.34% | 8.48% |
| Swing | ▲10.12 | ▼13.32 (Note: Compared to the combined Dandenong Labor and Independent Labor vote total at the 2020 election.) | ▲5.66 |
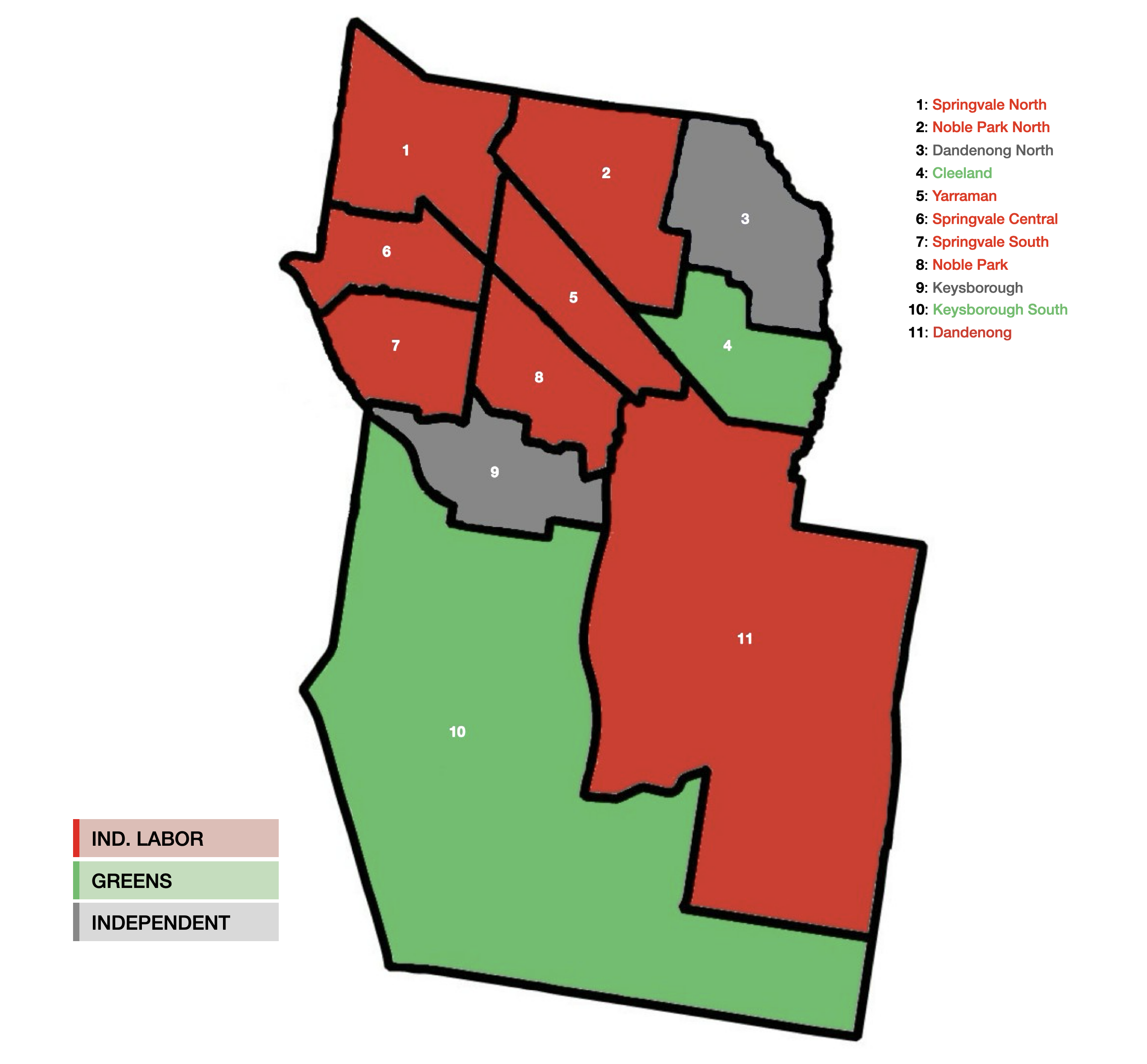
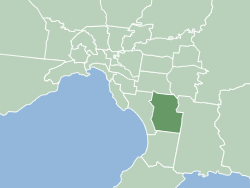
Largest party before election
Independent Labor
Subsequent largest party
Independent Labor

Greater Dandenong City Council is composed of 11 single-member wards. Greater Dandenong's ward structure was changed prior to the 2020 election, making this the second election with single-member wards.

Keysborough South Ward councillor Rhonda Garad successfully contested Cleeland Ward. Independent Liberal councillor Tim Dark did not seek re-election in Keysborough Ward.

=== Greater Dandenong results ===
2024 Victorian local elections: Greater Dandenong
| Party | Votes | % | Swing | Seats | Change |
|---|---|---|---|---|---|
| Independents | 31,088 | 46.04 | +10.12 | 2 | ▲1 |
| Independent Labor | 29,937 | 44.34 | −13.32 | 7 | ▼1 |
| Greens | 5,728 | 8.48 | +5.66 | 2 | ▲1 |
| Victorian Socialists | 766 | 1.13 | +1.13 | 0 | Steady |
| Formal votes | 67,519 | 96.56 | | | |
| Informal votes | 2,405 | 3.44 | | | |
| Total | 69,924 | 100.00 | | 11 | Steady |
| Registered voters | 93,869 | | | | |

=== Cleeland ===
2024 Victorian local elections: Cleeland Ward
| Party | Candidate | Votes | % | ±% |
|---|---|---|---|---|
| Greens | Rhonda Garad | 2,025 | 34.64 | |
| Independent Labor | Angela Long | 1,804 | 30.86 | +4.25 |
| Independent Labor | Zahra Haydar Big | 1,355 | 23.18 | |
| Independent Labor | Pradeep Hewavitharana | 662 | 11.32 | |
| Total formal votes | | 5,846 | 95.74 | +0.29 |
| Informal votes | | 260 | 4.26 | –0.29 |
| Turnout | | 6,106 | 75.36 | +0.58 |
Two-candidate-preferred result
| Greens | Rhonda Garad | 3,135 | 53.63 | |
| Independent Labor | Angela Long | 2,711 | 46.37 | –10.32 |
| Greens gain from Independent Labor | | | | |

=== Dandenong ===
2024 Victorian local elections: Dandenong Ward
| Party | Candidate | Votes | % | ±% |
|---|---|---|---|---|
| Independent Labor | Jim Memeti | 3,466 | 62.78 | +1.62 |
| Independent | Rahima Rizai | 2,055 | 37.22 | |
| Total formal votes | | 5,521 | 92.36 | –3.57 |
| Informal votes | | 457 | 7.64 | +3.57 |
| Turnout | | 5,978 | 75.05 | +2.48 |
| Independent Labor hold | | Swing | +1.62 | |

=== Dandenong North ===
2024 Victorian local elections: Dandenong North Ward
| Party | Candidate | Votes | % | ±% |
|---|---|---|---|---|
| Independent | Bob Milkovic | 3,828 | 52.03 | +11.10 |
| Independent | Rhonda Tannous | 1,924 | 26.15 | |
| Independent Labor | Daniel Formoso | 985 | 13.39 | |
| Independent | Rosana Ierone | 325 | 4.42 | |
| Independent Labor | Branka Tomic | 296 | 4.02 | |
| Total formal votes | | 7,358 | 97.38 | –0.16 |
| Informal votes | | 198 | 2.62 | +0.16 |
| Turnout | | 7,556 | 83.78 | –1.29 |
| Independent hold | | | | |

=== Keysborough ===
2024 Victorian local elections: Keysborough Ward
| Party | Candidate | Votes | % | ±% |
|---|---|---|---|---|
| Independent | Melinda Yim | 3,058 | 42.07 | |
| Independent | Peter Brown | 2,104 | 28.94 | |
| Independent | Daniel Dang | 793 | 10.91 | |
| Independent | Sinan Akkurt | 593 | 8.16 | |
| Victorian Socialists | Tevyn Gov | 328 | 4.51 | |
| Independent Labor | Hemara In | 215 | 2.96 | |
| Independent Labor | Reinaldo Ivan Pincheira | 178 | 2.45 | –0.36 |
| Total formal votes | | 7,269 | 97.00 | +0.40 |
| Informal votes | | 225 | 3.00 | –0.40 |
| Turnout | | 7,494 | 84.54 | –2.06 |
After distribution of preferences
| Independent | Melinda Yim | 3,734 | 51.37 | |
| Independent | Peter Brown | 2,404 | 33.07 | |
| Independent | Daniel Dang | 1,131 | 15.56 | |
| Independent gain from Independent Liberal | | | | |

=== Keysborough South ===
2024 Victorian local elections: Keysborough South Ward
| Party | Candidate | Votes | % | ±% |
|---|---|---|---|---|
| Greens | Isabella Do | 3,703 | 47.52 | +19.25 |
| Independent Labor | Alexandra Bryant | 1,340 | 17.19 | |
| Independent Labor | Ajdin Muzur | 1,274 | 16.35 | |
| Independent Labor | Sasha Jankovic | 797 | 10.23 | |
| Independent | Geraldine Gonsalvez | 679 | 8.71 | |
| Total formal votes | | 7,793 | 97.73 | +0.96 |
| Informal votes | | 181 | 2.27 | –0.96 |
| Turnout | | 7,974 | 86.82 | –0.50 |
After distribution of preferences
| Greens | Isabella Do | 4,027 | 51.67 | |
| Independent Labor | Alexandra Bryant | 1,498 | 19.22 | |
| Independent Labor | Ajdin Muzur | 1,355 | 17.39 | |
| Independent Labor | Sasha Jankovic | 913 | 11.72 | |
| Greens hold | | | | |

=== Noble Park ===
2024 Victorian local elections: Noble Park Ward
| Party | Candidate | Votes | % | ±% |
|---|---|---|---|---|
| Independent Labor | Sophie Tan | unopposed | | |
| Registered electors | | 9,066 | | |
| Independent Labor hold | | | | |

=== Noble Park North ===
2024 Victorian local elections: Noble Park North Ward
| Party | Candidate | Votes | % | ±% |
|---|---|---|---|---|
| Independent Labor | Lana Formoso | 3,873 | 55.45 | +14.51 |
| Independent | Will Billings | 2,082 | 29.81 | |
| Independent | Love Agravante | 548 | 7.85 | |
| Independent | Karl Rathnayake | 482 | 6.90 | |
| Total formal votes | | 6,985 | 97.42 | +0.70 |
| Informal votes | | 185 | 2.58 | –0.70 |
| Turnout | | 7,170 | 82.79 | –0.47 |
| Independent Labor hold | | | | |

=== Springvale Central ===
2024 Victorian local elections: Springvale Central Ward
| Party | Candidate | Votes | % | ±% |
|---|---|---|---|---|
| Independent Labor | Alice Phuong Le | 1,669 | 23.96 | |
| Independent Labor | Meng Bunlay | 1,635 | 23.47 | |
| Independent | Minh Le | 1,628 | 23.37 | |
| Independent | Brian Dalton | 985 | 14.14 | |
| Independent | Hor Truong | 612 | 8.78 | |
| Victorian Socialists | Sean Stebbings | 438 | 6.29 | |
| Total formal votes | | 6,967 | 97.58 | +0.13 |
| Informal votes | | 173 | 2.42 | –0.13 |
| Turnout | | 7,140 | 85.35 | +2.00 |
Two-candidate-preferred result
| Independent Labor | Alice Phuong Le | 4,022 | 57.73 | |
| Independent | Minh Le | 2,945 | 42.27 | |
| Independent Labor gain from Independent Labor | | | | |

=== Springvale North ===
2024 Victorian local elections: Springvale North Ward
| Party | Candidate | Votes | % | ±% |
|---|---|---|---|---|
| Independent Labor | Sean O'Reilly | 2,905 | 45.39 | –6.16 |
| Independent | Angela Holl | 2,262 | 35.34 | –7.29 |
| Independent | Huong Dinh | 1,233 | 19.27 | |
| Total formal votes | | 6,400 | 97.71 | +0.43 |
| Informal votes | | 150 | 2.29 | –0.43 |
| Turnout | | 6,550 | 83.64 | +2.85 |
Two-candidate-preferred result
| Independent Labor | Sean O'Reilly | 3,300 | 51.56 | |
| Independent | Angela Holl | 3,100 | 48.44 | |
| Independent Labor hold | | | | |

=== Springvale South ===
2024 Victorian local elections: Springvale South Ward
| Party | Candidate | Votes | % | ±% |
|---|---|---|---|---|
| Independent Labor | Loi Truong | 2,429 | 34.26 | +1.44 |
| Independent Labor | Thayhorn Yim | 1,364 | 19.24 | +7.10 |
| Independent | Andy Tran | 1,206 | 17.01 | |
| Independent | Yen Thai | 740 | 10.44 | |
| Independent | Maleb Hem | 712 | 10.04 | |
| Independent | Lin Sok | 639 | 9.01 | |
| Total formal votes | | 7,090 | 96.44 | –1.34 |
| Informal votes | | 262 | 3.56 | +1.34 |
| Turnout | | 7,352 | 86.37 | +0.98 |
Two-candidate-preferred result
| Independent Labor | Loi Truong | 4,098 | 57.80 | +7.24 |
| Independent Labor | Thayhorn Yim | 2,992 | 42.20 | |
| Independent Labor hold | | Swing | +7.24 | |

=== Yarraman ===
2024 Victorian local elections: Yarraman Ward (Note: Swings and percentage changes compared to results of the 2024 Yarraman Ward by-election.)
| Party | Candidate | Votes | % | ±% |
|---|---|---|---|---|
| Independent Labor | Phillip Danh | 3,690 | 58.66 | +35.80 |
| Independent | Ian Cook | 2,600 | 41.34 | +41.34 |
| Total formal votes | | 6,290 | 95.25 | +1.87 |
| Informal votes | | 314 | 4.75 | –1.87 |
| Turnout | | 6,604 | 79.57 | +12.44 |
| Independent Labor hold | | Swing | +7.63 | |

== Kingston ==
2024 Kingston City Council election
- October 2024

All 11 seats on Kingston City Council 6 seats needed for a majority
Largest party before election
No overall control
Subsequent largest party
Independents

Kingston City Council is composed of 11 single-member wards. Kingston's ward structure was changed prior to the 2020 election, making this the second election with single-member wards.

=== Kingston results ===
2024 Victorian local elections: Kingston
| Party | Votes | % | Swing | Seats | Change |
|---|---|---|---|---|---|
| Independents | 67,025 | 72.31 | | 8 | ▲3 |
| Independent Labor | 18,837 | 20.32 | | 3 | ▼1 |
| Independent Liberal | 2,845 | 3.07 | | 0 | ▼2 |
| Victorian Socialists | 2,714 | 2.93 | | 0 | Steady |
| Greens | 1,267 | 1.37 | | 0 | Steady |
| Formal votes | 92,688 | 96.74 | | | |
| Informal votes | 3,126 | 3.26 | | | |
| Total | 95,814 | 100.00 | | 11 | Steady |
| Registered voters / turnout | 114,049 | 84.01 | | | |

=== Banksia ===
2024 Victorian local elections: Banksia Ward
| Party | Candidate | Votes | % | ±% |
|---|---|---|---|---|
| Independent | Chris Howe | 5,079 | 61.38 | |
| Independent | Kalina Murday | 1,796 | 21.70 | |
| Independent | Rosemary Parrant | 771 | 9.32 | |
| Independent | Heather Smith | 629 | 7.60 | |
| Total formal votes | | 8,275 | 97.06 | +0.13 |
| Informal votes | | 251 | 2.94 | –0.13 |
| Turnout | | 8,526 | 80.35 | –1.92 |
After distribution of preferences
| Independent gain from Independent | | | | |

=== Bunjil ===
2024 Victorian local elections: Bunjil Ward
| Party | Candidate | Votes | % | ±% |
|---|---|---|---|---|
| Independent Labor | Tony Athanasopoulos | 4,791 | 56.96 | |
| Independent | Nikki Kaur | 3,620 | 43.04 | |
| Total formal votes | | 8,411 | 95.34 | –2.56 |
| Informal votes | | 411 | 4.66 | +2.56 |
| Turnout | | 8,822 | 83.42 | +0.56 |
Two-candidate-preferred result
| Independent Labor gain from Independent Labor | | | | |

=== Caruana ===
2024 Victorian local elections: Caruana Ward
| Party | Candidate | Votes | % | ±% |
|---|---|---|---|---|
| Independent | Caroline White | 2,713 | 30.84 | |
| Independent Labor | Eric Lee | 1,878 | 21.35 | |
| Independent Labor | Natan Raykhtin-Breitenfeld | 1,040 | 11.82 | |
| Independent | Shannon Hughes | 1,022 | 11.62 | |
| Independent Liberal | Sav Peulich | 822 | 9.34 | –5.35 |
| Independent | Michael Carty | 435 | 4.94 | –1.80 |
| Independent | Riz Sheikh Nasir | 412 | 4.68 | |
| Independent | Joe Crupi | 275 | 3.13 | |
| Independent Liberal | Gandhi Bevinakoppa | 201 | 2.28 | |
| Total formal votes | | 8,798 | 96.31 | –1.07 |
| Informal votes | | 337 | 3.69 | +1.07 |
| Turnout | | 9,135 | 88.38 | +0.26 |
Two-candidate-preferred result
| Independent | Caroline White | 5,369 | 61.03 | |
| Independent Labor | Eric Lee | 3,429 | 38.97 | |
| Independent gain from Independent Liberal | | | | |

=== Chicquita ===
2024 Victorian local elections: Chicquita Ward
| Party | Candidate | Votes | % | ±% |
|---|---|---|---|---|
| Independent | Jane Agirtan | 1,937 | 23.06 | |
| Independent | Tracey Davies | 1,620 | 19.29 | –12.86 |
| Independent | Wandzia French | 966 | 11.50 | |
| Independent | Ian Baldock | 812 | 9.67 | +3.26 |
| Independent | Rosemary West | 758 | 9.02 | –18.08 |
| Victorian Socialists | Jayden McKay | 591 | 7.04 | |
| Independent Labor | Lachlan McDonald | 568 | 6.76 | |
| Independent | Emma Doble | 533 | 6.35 | |
| Independent | Anna Ricciuti | 411 | 4.89 | |
| Independent | Lina Pistone | 204 | 2.43 | |
| Total formal votes | | 8,400 | 95.21 | –1.90 |
| Informal votes | | 423 | 4.79 | +1.90 |
| Turnout | | 8,823 | 85.45 | –0.65 |
Two-candidate-preferred result
| Independent | Jane Agirtan | 4,438 | 52.83 | |
| Independent | Tracey Davies | 3,962 | 47.17 | –11.24 |
| Independent gain from Independent | | | | |

=== Como ===
2024 Victorian local elections: Como Ward
| Party | Candidate | Votes | % | ±% |
|---|---|---|---|---|
| Independent | Chris Hill | 2,933 | 34.07 | +3.89 |
| Independent | Victoria Oxley | 1,903 | 22.10 | |
| Independent | Brendan Lenarcic | 1,758 | 20.42 | |
| Independent | David Beckett | 1,357 | 15.76 | |
| Independent | Ya Ge Xu | 658 | 7.64 | |
| Total formal votes | | 8,609 | 97.70 | –0.32 |
| Informal votes | | 203 | 2.30 | +0.32 |
| Turnout | | 8,812 | 82.09 | –2.15 |
Two-candidate-preferred result
| Independent | Chris Hill | 4,582 | 53.22 | –3.62 |
| Independent | Victoria Oxley | 4,027 | 46.78 | |
| Independent hold | | Swing | –3.62 | |

=== Karkarook ===
2024 Victorian local elections: Karkarook Ward
| Party | Candidate | Votes | % | ±% |
|---|---|---|---|---|
| Independent Labor | Hadi Saab | 3,744 | 45.04 | +24.55 |
| Independent | Jono Ling | 1,940 | 23.34 | |
| Victorian Socialists | Lauren Stevenson | 1,611 | 19.38 | |
| Independent | Shiva Ambadgatti | 1,018 | 12.25 | |
| Total formal votes | | 8,313 | 96.82 | +1.79 |
| Informal votes | | 273 | 3.18 | –1.79 |
| Turnout | | 8,586 | 83.59 | +0.45 |
After distribution of preferences
| Independent Labor | Hadi Saab | 4,180 | 50.28 | |
| Independent | Jono Ling | 2,400 | 28.87 | |
| Victorian Socialists | Lauren Stevenson | 1,733 | 20.85 | |
| Independent Labor hold | | | | |

=== Longbeach ===
2024 Victorian local elections: Longbeach Ward
| Party | Candidate | Votes | % | ±% |
|---|---|---|---|---|
| Independent Labor | Georgina Oxley | 3,020 | 37.94 | –7.87 |
| Independent | Rohan Parrant | 1,996 | 25.08 | |
| Independent | Bronwyn Currie | 1,413 | 17.75 | +10.95 |
| Independent | Luke Gilling | 622 | 7.81 | |
| Independent | David Walker | 539 | 6.77 | +1.30 |
| Independent | Samara Dixon | 370 | 4.65 | |
| Total formal votes | | 7,960 | 96.54 | –0.35 |
| Informal votes | | 285 | 3.46 | +0.35 |
| Turnout | | 8,245 | 83.32 | –0.34 |
Two-candidate-preferred result
| Independent Labor | Georgina Oxley | 4,448 | 55.88 | |
| Independent | Rohan Parrant | 3,512 | 44.12 | |
| Independent Labor hold | | | | |

=== Melaleuca ===
2024 Victorian local elections: Melaleuca Ward
| Party | Candidate | Votes | % | ±% |
|---|---|---|---|---|
| Independent | Tess Law | 2,687 | 29.90 | |
| Independent Liberal | Louise Black | 1,822 | 20.27 | |
| Independent | Declan Dubout | 1,747 | 19.44 | |
| Independent | Gavin Nolan | 1,405 | 15.63 | |
| Greens | Alex Breskin | 691 | 7.69 | |
| Independent | Jack Cassidy | 636 | 7.08 | |
| Total formal votes | | 8,988 | 97.50 | −0.39 |
| Informal votes | | 230 | 2.50 | +0.39 |
| Turnout | | 9,218 | 83.31 | −1.60 |
Two-candidate-preferred result
| Independent | Tess Law | 5,103 | 56.78 | |
| Independent Liberal | Louise Black | 3,885 | 43.22 | |
| Independent gain from Independent | | | | |

==== 2026 Melaleuca Ward by-election ====
2026 Melaleuca Ward by-election (13–31 July 2026)
| Party | Candidate | Votes | % | ±% |
|---|---|---|---|---|
| Independent | Glen Dumbrell | 1,591 | 18.84 | +18.84 |
| Independent | Nikki Kaur | 1,260 | 14.92 | +14.92 |
| Independent Liberal | Louise Black | 1,246 | 14.75 | −5.52 |
| Independent | Lachlan McDonald | 716 | 8.48 | +8.48 |
| Independent | Bronwyn Currie | 706 | 8.36 | +8.36 |
| Independent | Hayden Davies | 645 | 7.64 | +7.64 |
| Independent Liberal | Brian Paynter | 601 | 7.11 | +7.11 |
| Independent | Peter Brown | 408 | 4.83 | +4.83 |
| Independent | David Baker | 395 | 4.68 | +4.68 |
| Independent | Gavin Nolan | 255 | 3.02 | −12.61 |
| Independent | Joe Crupi | 220 | 2.60 | +2.60 |
| Independent | Nicholas Bufalo | 215 | 2.55 | +2.55 |
| Independent | Llewellyn Dixon-Mason | 189 | 2.24 | +2.24 |
| Total formal votes | | 8,447 | 95.69 | −2.76 |
| Informal votes | | 469 | 5.26 | +2.76 |
| Turnout | | 8,916 | 79.01 | −4.30 |
Two-candidate-preferred result
| Independent | Nikki Kaur | 4,336 | 51.33 | +51.33 |
| Independent | Glenn Dumbrell | 4,111 | 48.67 | +48.67 |
| Independent gain from Independent | | Swing | +51.33 | |

- By-election held after the resignation of sitting councillor Tess Law.

=== Sandpiper ===
2024 Victorian local elections: Sandpiper Ward
| Party | Candidate | Votes | % | ±% |
|---|---|---|---|---|
| Independent | Kirralee Ashworth-Collett | 3,584 | 42.26 | |
| Independent | Graham Fountain | 2,286 | 26.96 | +5.33 |
| Independent Labor | Kealey Nutt | 1,962 | 23.14 | |
| Independent | Abraham Jesus Garcia | 648 | 7.64 | |
| Total formal votes | | 8,480 | 97.92 | +0.50 |
| Informal votes | | 180 | 2.08 | –0.50 |
| Turnout | | 8,660 | 85.13 | –0.76 |
Two-candidate-preferred result
| Independent | Kirralee Ashworth-Collett | 5,367 | 63.29 | |
| Independent | Graham Fountain | 3,113 | 36.71 | –9.75 |
| Independent gain from Independent Labor | | | | |

=== Wattle ===
2024 Victorian local elections: Wattle Ward
| Party | Candidate | Votes | % | ±% |
|---|---|---|---|---|
| Independent | Jenna Davey-Burns | 2,253 | 28.80 | –0.97 |
| Independent Freedom | Georgia Erevnidis | 1,878 | 24.00 | |
| Independent | Geoff Woods | 1,582 | 20.22 | |
| Independent | Aldo Comazzetto | 738 | 9.43 | |
| Independent | Trent Pirihi | 549 | 7.02 | |
| Victorian Socialists | Amiriya Dorian | 512 | 6.54 | |
| Independent | Nadica Visic | 312 | 3.99 | |
| Total formal votes | | 7,824 | 96.90 | –0.56 |
| Informal votes | | 250 | 3.10 | +0.56 |
| Turnout | | 8,074 | 81.99 | –1.57 |
Two-candidate-preferred result
| Independent Freedom | Georgia Erevnidis | 4,312 | 55.11 | +55.11 |
| Independent | Jenna Davey-Burns | 3,512 | 44.89 | –12.49 |
| Independent Freedom gain from Independent | | | | |

=== Yammerbrook ===
2024 Victorian local elections: Yammerbrook Ward
| Party | Candidate | Votes | % | ±% |
|---|---|---|---|---|
| Independent | Sarah O'Donnell | 2,690 | 31.17 | |
| Independent | Greg McMahon | 2,173 | 25.18 | |
| Independent Labor | David Eden | 1,834 | 21.25 | |
| Greens | Susanna Moore | 576 | 6.67 | |
| Independent | Tony Firman | 451 | 5.23 | |
| Independent | Mark Tarulli | 423 | 4.90 | |
| Independent | Daniel Loza | 273 | 3.16 | |
| Independent | Mellissa Glanville | 210 | 2.43 | |
| Total formal votes | | 8,630 | 96.82 | –0.88 |
| Informal votes | | 283 | 3.18 | +0.88 |
| Turnout | | 8,913 | 87.29 | –0.18 |
Two-candidate-preferred result
| Independent | Sarah O'Donnell | 5,136 | 59.51 | |
| Independent | Greg McMahon | 3,494 | 40.49 | |
| Independent gain from Independent Liberal | | | | |

== Mornington Peninsula ==
2024 Mornington Peninsula Shire Council election
- October 2024

All 11 seats on Mornington Peninsula Shire Council 6 seats needed for a majority
Largest party before election
Independents
Subsequent largest party
Independents

Mornington Peninsula Shire Council is composed of eleven single-member wards. Prior to the 2024 election, it was composed of six wards (three single-member wards, one two-member ward and two three-member wards), but the electoral structure has changed as a result of the Local Government Act 2020.

=== Mornington Peninsula results ===
2024 Victorian local elections: Mornington Peninsula
| Party | Votes | % | Swing | Seats | Change |
|---|---|---|---|---|---|
| Independent | 90,460 | 82.86 | | 10 | ▼1 |
| Independent Liberal | 10,013 | 9.17 | | 1 | ▲1 |
| Independent Labor | 5,864 | 5.37 | | 0 | Steady |
| Greens | 2,026 | 1.86 | | 0 | Steady |
| Victorian Socialists | 811 | 0.74 | | 0 | Steady |
| Formal votes | 109,174 | 97.01 | | | |
| Informal votes | 3,360 | 2.99 | | | |
| Total | 112,534 | 100.00 | | 11 | Steady |
| Registered voters / turnout | 134,819 | 83.47 | | | |

=== Beek Beek ===
2024 Victorian local elections: Beek Beek Ward
| Party | Candidate | Votes | % | ±% |
|---|---|---|---|---|
| Independent | Kate Roper | 6,367 | 66.74 | |
| Independent | Lavinia Jenkin | 3,173 | 33.26 | |
| Total formal votes | | 9,540 | 94.36 | |
| Informal votes | | 570 | 5.64 | |
| Turnout | | 10,110 | 85.56 | |
| Independent win | | (new ward) | | |

=== Benbenjie ===
2024 Victorian local elections: Benbenjie Ward
| Party | Candidate | Votes | % | ±% |
|---|---|---|---|---|
| Independent | Max Patton | 4,593 | 48.53 | |
| Independent Liberal | Peter Clarke | 4,113 | 43.45 | |
| Independent | Dinka Jakovac | 759 | 8.02 | |
| Total formal votes | | 9,465 | 97.70 | |
| Informal votes | | 223 | 2.30 | |
| Turnout | | 9,688 | 85.18 | |
Two-candidate-preferred result
| Independent | Max Patton | 5,097 | 53.85 | |
| Independent Liberal | Peter Clarke | 4,368 | 46.15 | |
| Independent win | | (new ward) | | |

=== Briars ===
2024 Victorian local elections: Briars Ward
| Party | Candidate | Votes | % | ±% |
|---|---|---|---|---|
| Independent | Anthony Marsh | 7,717 | 70.43 | |
| Independent | Despi O'Connor | 3,240 | 29.57 | |
| Independent | Bill Daish (ineligible) | N/A | N/A | |
| Total formal votes | | 10,957 | 98.43 | |
| Informal votes | | 175 | 1.57 | |
| Turnout | | 11,132 | 85.97 | |
| Independent win | | (new ward) | | |

==== 2026 Briars Ward by-election ====
2026 Briars Ward by-election (14 September – 2 October 2026)
| Party | Candidate | Votes | % | ±% |
|---|---|---|---|---|
| Independent | Christine Leahy | 6,525 | 64.17 | +64.17 |
| Independent | Sue Ellison-Whyte | 3,644 | 35.83 | +35.83 |
| Total formal votes | | 10,169 | 96.22 | −2.21 |
| Informal votes | | 399 | 3.78 | +2.21 |
| Turnout | | 10,568 | 80.02 | −5.95 |
| Independent gain from Independent | | Swing | +64.17 | |

- By-election held after sitting councillor Anthony Marsh was elected as the member for Nepean in the Victorian Legislative Assembly.

=== Brokil ===
2024 Victorian local elections: Brokil Ward
| Party | Candidate | Votes | % | ±% |
|---|---|---|---|---|
| Independent | Patrick Binyon | 5,117 | 50.93 | |
| Independent | Elizabeth Woolcock | 3,580 | 35.63 | |
| Independent | Marie Murray | 1,351 | 13.45 | |
| Total formal votes | | 10,048 | 97.53 | |
| Informal votes | | 254 | 2.47 | |
| Turnout | | 10,302 | 82.85 | |
| Independent win | | (new ward) | | |

=== Coolart ===
2024 Victorian local elections: Coolart Ward
| Party | Candidate | Votes | % | ±% |
|---|---|---|---|---|
| Independent | David Gill | 4,715 | 45.07 | |
| Independent | Neil Biggins | 3,395 | 32.45 | |
| Independent | Dennice Allen-Breeschoten | 2,351 | 22.47 | |
| Total formal votes | | 10,461 | 97.97 | |
| Informal votes | | 217 | 2.03 | |
| Turnout | | 10,678 | 83.64 | |
Two-candidate-preferred result
| Independent | David Gill | 5,474 | 52.33 | |
| Independent | Neil Biggins | 4,987 | 47.67 | |
| Independent win | | (new ward) | | |

=== Kackeraboite ===
2024 Victorian local elections: Kackeraboite Ward
| Party | Candidate | Votes | % | ±% |
|---|---|---|---|---|
| Independent Liberal | Stephen Batty | 5,900 | 60.77 | |
| Independent Labor | Daniel McCaffrey | 3,808 | 39.23 | |
| Total formal votes | | 9,708 | 95.42 | |
| Informal votes | | 466 | 4.58 | |
| Turnout | | 10,174 | 85.83 | |
| Independent Liberal win | | (new ward) | | |

=== Moorooduc ===
2024 Victorian local elections: Moorooduc Ward
| Party | Candidate | Votes | % | ±% |
|---|---|---|---|---|
| Independent | Bruce Ranken | 5,241 | 56.15 | |
| Independent | Kathryn Smith | 4,093 | 43.85 | |
| Total formal votes | | 9,334 | 95.64 | |
| Informal votes | | 426 | 4.36 | |
| Turnout | | 9,760 | 83.98 | |
| Independent win | | (new ward) | | |

=== Nepean ===
2024 Victorian local elections: Nepean Ward
| Party | Candidate | Votes | % | ±% |
|---|---|---|---|---|
| Independent | Susan Bissinger | 2,279 | 21.79 | |
| Independent | Andrea Allen | 2,252 | 21.53 | |
| Independent | Eddie Matt | 2,103 | 20.11 | |
| Independent | Josie Jones | 1,568 | 14.99 | |
| Independent | Suzanne Jones | 1,509 | 14.43 | |
| Independent | Krysten Le Marshall | 457 | 4.37 | |
| Independent | Monique Toms | 290 | 2.77 | |
| Total formal votes | | 10,458 | 97.48 | |
| Informal votes | | 270 | 2.52 | |
| Turnout | | 10,728 | 82.68 | |
Two-candidate-preferred result
| Independent | Andrea Allen | 5,396 | 51.60 | |
| Independent | Eddie Matt | 5,062 | 48.40 | |
| Independent win | | (new ward) | | |

=== Tanti ===
2024 Victorian local elections: Tanti Ward
| Party | Candidate | Votes | % | ±% |
|---|---|---|---|---|
| Independent | Paul Pingiaro | 4,827 | 49.53 | |
| Independent | Nick Fallaw | 2,840 | 29.14 | |
| Independent | Tom Davies | 1,237 | 12.69 | |
| Independent | Barry Besanko | 842 | 8.64 | |
| Total formal votes | | 9,746 | 98.04 | |
| Informal votes | | 195 | 1.96 | |
| Turnout | | 9,941 | 83.28 | |
After distribution of preferences
| Independent | Paul Pingiaro | 5,212 | 53.48 | |
| Independent | Nick Fallaw | 3,102 | 31.83 | |
| Independent | Tom Davies | 1,432 | 14.69 | |
| Independent win | | (new ward) | | |

=== Tootgarook ===
2024 Victorian local elections: Tootgarook Ward
| Party | Candidate | Votes | % | ±% |
|---|---|---|---|---|
| Independent | Cam Williams | 3,790 | 39.64 | |
| Independent | Antonella Celi | 3,746 | 39.18 | |
| Greens | Andrew De Bartolo | 2,026 | 21.19 | |
| Total formal votes | | 9,562 | 97.41 | |
| Informal votes | | 254 | 2.59 | |
| Turnout | | 9,816 | 79.50 | |
Two-candidate-preferred result
| Independent | Cam Williams | 4,929 | 51.55 | |
| Independent | Antonella Celi | 4,633 | 48.45 | |
| Independent win | | (new ward) | | |

=== Warringine ===
2024 Victorian local elections: Warringine Ward
| Party | Candidate | Votes | % | ±% |
|---|---|---|---|---|
| Independent | Michael Stephens | 3,458 | 34.95 | |
| Independent | Hilda Rachid | 2,544 | 25.71 | |
| Independent Labor | Simon Meyer | 2,056 | 20.78 | |
| Independent | Mark Palmer | 1,026 | 10.37 | |
| Victorian Socialists | Nic Robertson | 811 | 8.20 | |
| Total formal votes | | 9,895 | 96.96 | |
| Informal votes | | 310 | 3.04 | |
| Turnout | | 10,205 | 80.22 | |
Two-candidate-preferred result
| Independent | Michael Stephens | 5,760 | 58.21 | |
| Independent | Hilda Rachid | 4,135 | 41.79 | |
| Independent win | | (new ward) | | |

== Stonnington ==
2024 Stonnington City Council election
- October 2024

All 9 seats on Stonnington City Council 5 seats needed for a majority
Largest party before election
No overall control
Subsequent largest party
Independents

Stonnington City Council is composed of nine single-member wards. Prior to the 2024 election, it was composed of three multi-member wards with three members each, but the electoral structure has changed as a result of the Local Government Act 2020.

=== Stonnington results ===
2024 Victorian local elections: Stonnington
| Party | Votes | % | Swing | Seats | Change |
|---|---|---|---|---|---|
| Independent | 27,648 | 48.15 | | 6 | ▲3 |
| Independent Liberal | 13,873 | 24.16 | | 1 | ▼2 |
| Greens | 7,478 | 13.02 | | 0 | ▼2 |
| Independent Labor | 6,418 | 11.18 | | 2 | ▲1 |
| Libertarian | 1,125 | 1.96 | | 0 | Steady |
| Victorian Socialists | 873 | 1.52 | | 0 | Steady |
| Formal votes | 57,415 | 97.57 | | | |
| Informal votes | 1,432 | 2.43 | | | |
| Total | 58,847 | 100.00 | | 9 | Steady |
| Registered voters / turnout | 76,735 | 76.69 | | | |

=== Como ===
2024 Victorian local elections: Como Ward
| Party | Candidate | Votes | % | ±% |
|---|---|---|---|---|
| Independent Labor | Meghan Hopper | 1,819 | 34.89 | |
| Greens | Hamish Taylor | 1,294 | 24.82 | |
| Independent Liberal | Luke Balasingam | 1,084 | 20.79 | |
| Independent Liberal | Spencer James Millear | 755 | 14.48 | |
| Victorian Socialists | Clayton Doueihi | 261 | 5.01 | |
| Total formal votes | | 5,213 | 98.36 | |
| Informal votes | | 87 | 1.64 | |
| Turnout | | 5,300 | 67.59 | |
Two-candidate-preferred result
| Independent Labor | Meghan Hopper | 3,319 | 63.67 | |
| Greens | Hamish Taylor | 1,894 | 36.33 | |
| Independent Labor win | | (new ward) | | |

=== Greville ===
2024 Victorian local elections: Greville Ward
| Party | Candidate | Votes | % | ±% |
|---|---|---|---|---|
| Independent | Melina Sehr | 1,801 | 34.21 | |
| Greens | Mike Scott | 1,083 | 20.57 | |
| Independent | Paul Francazio | 809 | 15.37 | |
| Independent | Susan Louey | 693 | 13.16 | |
| Independent | Alison Baker | 487 | 9.25 | |
| Independent | Francois Geraghty | 311 | 5.91 | |
| Independent | Alan Menadue | 81 | 1.54 | |
| Total formal votes | | 5,265 | 97.50 | |
| Informal votes | | 135 | 2.50 | |
| Turnout | | 5,400 | 68.46 | |
Two-candidate-preferred result
| Independent | Melina Sehr | 3,370 | 64.01 | |
| Greens | Mike Scott | 1,895 | 35.99 | |
| Independent win | | (new ward) | | |

=== Hedgeley Dene ===
2024 Victorian local elections: Hedgeley Dene Ward
| Party | Candidate | Votes | % | ±% |
|---|---|---|---|---|
| Independent | Sally Davis | 2,765 | 38.39 | |
| Independent Liberal | Josh Fast | 2,587 | 35.92 | |
| Independent | Claudio Bevilacqua | 1,250 | 17.36 | |
| Independent | Joel Iglicki | 600 | 8.33 | |
| Total formal votes | | 7,202 | 97.89 | |
| Informal votes | | 155 | 2.11 | |
| Turnout | | 7,357 | 84.23 | |
Two-candidate-preferred result
| Independent | Sally Davis | 3,720 | 51.65 | |
| Independent Liberal | Josh Fast | 3,482 | 48.35 | |
| Independent win | | (new ward) | | |

=== Malvern Valley ===
2024 Victorian local elections: Malvern Valley Ward
| Party | Candidate | Votes | % | ±% |
|---|---|---|---|---|
| Independent Labor | Jami Klisaris | 4,599 | 61.63 | |
| Independent | Joe Gianfriddo | 2,863 | 38.37 | |
| Total formal votes | | 7,462 | 95.63 | |
| Informal votes | | 341 | 4.37 | |
| Turnout | | 7,803 | 83.31 | |
| Independent Labor win | | (new ward) | | |

=== Orrong ===
2024 Victorian local elections: Orrong Ward
| Party | Candidate | Votes | % | ±% |
|---|---|---|---|---|
| Independent | Samantha Choudhury | 2,981 | 48.37 | |
| Independent | Henry Buch | 1,805 | 29.29 | |
| Greens | Arkie Paten | 1,377 | 22.34 | |
| Total formal votes | | 6,163 | 98.01 | |
| Informal votes | | 125 | 1.99 | |
| Turnout | | 6,288 | 73.82 | |
Two-candidate-preferred result
| Independent | Samantha Choudhury | 4,099 | 66.51 | |
| Independent | Henry Buch | 2,064 | 33.49 | |
| Independent win | | (new ward) | | |

=== South Yarra ===
2024 Victorian local elections: South Yarra Ward
| Party | Candidate | Votes | % | ±% |
|---|---|---|---|---|
| Independent | Kate Hely | 2,468 | 47.40 | |
| Independent Liberal | Julie McLean | 1,531 | 29.40 | |
| Greens | Mitch Fuller | 1,208 | 23.20 | |
| Total formal votes | | 5,207 | 97.69 | |
| Informal votes | | 123 | 2.31 | |
| Turnout | | 5,330 | 69.99 | |
Two-candidate-preferred result
| Independent | Kate Hely | 3,226 | 61.96 | |
| Independent Liberal | Julie McLean | 1,981 | 38.04 | |
| Independent win | | (new ward) | | |

=== Toorak ===
2024 Victorian local elections: Toorak Ward
| Party | Candidate | Votes | % | ±% |
|---|---|---|---|---|
| Independent Liberal | Marcia Griffin | 2,527 | 37.60 | |
| Independent Liberal | Tom Humphries | 2,347 | 34.92 | |
| Libertarian | David Segal | 1,125 | 16.74 | |
| Independent Liberal | Lloyd Bickerton | 722 | 10.74 | |
| Total formal votes | | 6,721 | 97.69 | |
| Informal votes | | 159 | 2.31 | |
| Turnout | | 6,880 | 77.57 | |
Two-candidate-preferred result
| Independent Liberal | Tom Humphries | 3,501 | 52.09 | |
| Independent Liberal | Marcia Griffin | 3,220 | 47.91 | |
| Independent Liberal win | | (new ward) | | |

=== Tooronga ===
2024 Victorian local elections: Tooronga Ward
| Party | Candidate | Votes | % | ±% |
|---|---|---|---|---|
| Greens | Polly Morgan | 2,516 | 34.29 | |
| Independent | Jamie Bell | 2,502 | 34.10 | |
| Independent Liberal | Peter Hammond | 2,320 | 31.62 | |
| Total formal votes | | 7,338 | 97.83 | |
| Informal votes | | 163 | 2.17 | |
| Turnout | | 7,501 | 82.16 | |
Two-candidate-preferred result
| Independent | Jamie Bell | 4,243 | 57.82 | |
| Greens | Polly Morgan | 3,095 | 42.18 | |
| Independent win | | (new ward) | | |

=== Wattletree ===
2024 Victorian local elections: Wattletree Ward
| Party | Candidate | Votes | % | ±% |
|---|---|---|---|---|
| Independent | Nicki Batagol | 2,138 | 31.24 | |
| Independent | Steve Stefanopoulos | 1,915 | 27.98 | |
| Independent | Tammy Lidano | 1,414 | 20.66 | |
| Independent | Kerry Nasser | 765 | 11.18 | |
| Victorian Socialists | Allyssa Gardner | 612 | 8.94 | |
| Total formal votes | | 6,844 | 97.94 | |
| Informal votes | | 144 | 2.06 | |
| Turnout | | 6,988 | 79.70 | |
Two-candidate-preferred result
| Independent | Steve Stefanopoulos | 3,450 | 50.41 | |
| Independent | Nicki Batagol | 3,394 | 49.59 | |
| Independent win | | (new ward) | | |

== See also ==
- Results of the 2024 Victorian local elections in Eastern Melbourne
- Results of the 2024 Victorian local elections in Inner Melbourne
- Results of the 2024 Victorian local elections in Northern Melbourne
- Results of the 2024 Victorian local elections in Western Melbourne
