= Eden Foster =

Australian politician

Eden Foster MP

Member of the Victorian Legislative Assembly for Mulgrave
- Incumbent
- Assumed office 18 November 2023
- Preceded by: Daniel Andrews

Mayor of Greater Dandenong
- In office 10 November 2022 – 16 November 2023
- Preceded by: Jim Memeti
- Succeeded by: Lana Formoso

Councillor of the City of Greater Dandenong for Yarraman Ward
- In office 24 October 2020 – 16 November 2023
- Preceded by: New ward
- Succeeded by: Phillip Danh

Personal details
- Party: Labor

Eden Foster (born 1981) is an Australian politician who has served in the Victorian Legislative Assembly as the member for Mulgrave since 2023.

== Political career ==
Foster joined the Victorian Labor Party in 2019, and was elected to the City of Greater Dandenong in Yarraman Ward at the 2020 Victorian local elections. In November 2022, she was elected as mayor by a vote of fellow councillors.

On 6 October 2023, Foster was chosen as Labor's candidate for the Mulgrave by-election following the resignation of incumbent MP and premier Daniel Andrews. She was subsequently comfortably elected, becoming the first woman to represent the Division of Mulgrave.

The by-election for Yarraman Ward, triggered by Foster's resignation from council, was won by Phillip Danh in March 2024.

Foster is a member of the Parliament of Victoria's Integrity and Oversight Committee.

== Personal life ==
Foster's mother was born in India and father is Australian. Prior to her election, Foster was a school psychologist at a Catholic school in North Melbourne.

In 2024, soon after her election, Foster detected a lump on her neck. She sought medical treatment and was diagnosed with a form of blood cancer. Foster took a short break for treatment before returning to work. She was supported by Member for Dandenong, Labor’s Gabrielle Williams, who shaved her head to raise money for the Cancer Council, raising $17,000.

Victorian Legislative Assembly
Preceded by Daniel Andrews	Member for Mulgrave; 2023–present	Incumbent
