= Electoral district of Mulgrave (Victoria) =

State electoral district of Victoria, Australia

Mulgrave Victoria—Legislative Assembly
- Interactive map of electoral district boundaries from the 2022 state election
- State: Victoria
- Dates current: 1958–1967; 2002–present
- MP: Eden Foster
- Party: Labor
- Namesake: Suburb of Mulgrave
- Electors: 40,588 (2018)
- Area: 36 km^{2} (13.9 sq mi)
- Demographic: Metropolitan
Electorates around Mulgrave:
Oakleigh	Glen Waverley	Rowville
Clarinda	Mulgrave	Rowville
Clarinda	Clarinda	Dandenong

The electoral district of Mulgrave is situated in the south-east of the Melbourne Metropolitan Region. The electorate contains the suburbs of Mulgrave and Noble Park North. It also contains parts of the suburbs of Dandenong North, Noble Park, Springvale and Wheelers Hill.

The seat previously existed from 1958 to 1967 as a safe Liberal seat. It was abolished in 1967 and replaced by Syndal.

Mulgrave was recreated in 2002 as a marginal Labor seat, replacing Dandenong North. Labor's Daniel Andrews easily won the seat amid that year's massive Labor landslide, and held it until his resignation in 2023. He was elected as leader of Victorian Labor following its defeat in 2010, and served as Premier from 2014 to 2023.

== Members for Mulgrave ==
First incarnation (1958–1967)
Member	Party	Term
Ray Wiltshire	Liberal and Country	1958–1967
Ray Wiltshire	Liberal	1958–1967
Second incarnation (2002–present)
Member	Party	Term
Daniel Andrews	Labor	2002–2023
Eden Foster	Labor	2023–present

== Election results ==
2023 Mulgrave state by-election
Party	Candidate	Votes	%	±%
Labor	Eden Foster	14,481	40.18	−10.82
Liberal	Courtney Mann	7,817	21.69	+4.50
Independent	Ian Cook	6,780	18.81	+0.80
Greens	Rhonda Garad	2,153	5.97	+0.89
Victorian Socialists	Kelly Cvetkova	1,315	3.65	+3.65
Family First	Jane Foreman	1,111	3.08	+1.11
Libertarian	Ethelyn King	1,046	2.90	+2.90
Independent	Tina Theodossopoulou	662	1.84	+1.04
Animal Justice	Bronwyn Currie	403	1.12	+1.12
Sustainable Australia	Celeste Ackerly	276	0.77	+0.77
Total formal votes		36,044	94.46	+3.13
Informal votes		2,112	5.54	−3.13
Turnout		38,156	80.94	−7.46
Notional two-party-preferred count
Labor	Eden Foster	19,704	54.67	−5.53
Liberal	Courtney Mann	16,340	45.33	+5.53
Two-candidate-preferred result
Labor	Eden Foster	20,363	56.49	−4.34
Independent	Ian Cook	15,681	43.51	+4.34
Labor hold		Swing	−4.34	
