= Local government areas of Victoria =

Types of LGAs

Victoria LGAs by largest council faction as of 2025

This is a list of local government areas (LGAs) in Victoria, sorted by region.

Also referred to as municipalities, the 79 Victorian LGAs are classified as cities (34), shires (38), rural cities (6) and boroughs (1). In general, an urban or suburban LGA is called a city and is governed by a city council, while a rural LGA covering a larger rural area is usually called a shire and is governed by a shire council. Local councils have the same administrative functions and similar political structures, regardless of their classification.

Local elections are held in Victoria every four years with the most recent elections held in 2024.

== Current local government areas ==
=== Greater Melbourne ===
Detail of Local Government Areas in and around Melbourne

Local government area	Council seat	Date established	Land area	Population (2021)	Councillors (2022)	Map
City of Banyule	Greensborough	15 December 1994	63 km^{2} (24 sq mi)	126,236	9	
City of Bayside	Sandringham	15 December 1994	37 km^{2} (14 sq mi)	101,306	7	
City of Boroondara	Camberwell	22 June 1994	60 km^{2} (23 sq mi)	167,900	11	
City of Brimbank	Sunshine	15 December 1994	123 km^{2} (47 sq mi)	194,618	11	
Shire of Cardinia	Officer	15 December 1994	1,283 km^{2} (495 sq mi)	118,194	9	
City of Casey	Narre Warren	15 December 1994	409 km^{2} (158 sq mi)	365,239	11	
City of Darebin	Preston	22 June 1994	54 km^{2} (21 sq mi)	148,570	9	
City of Frankston	Frankston	15 December 1994	130 km^{2} (50 sq mi)	139,281	9	
City of Glen Eira	Caulfield North	15 December 1994	39 km^{2} (15 sq mi)	148,908	9	
City of Greater Dandenong	Dandenong	15 December 1994	130 km^{2} (50 sq mi)	158,208	11	
City of Hobsons Bay	Altona	22 June 1994	64 km^{2} (25 sq mi)	91,322	7	
City of Hume	Broadmeadows	15 December 1994	504 km^{2} (195 sq mi)	243,901	11	
City of Kingston	Cheltenham	15 December 1994	91 km^{2} (35 sq mi)	158,129	9	
City of Knox	Wantirna South	16 November 1963	114 km^{2} (44 sq mi)	159,103	9	
City of Manningham	Doncaster	15 December 1994	113 km^{2} (44 sq mi)	124,700	9	
City of Maribyrnong	Footscray	15 December 1994	31 km^{2} (12 sq mi)	85,209	7	
City of Maroondah	Ringwood	15 December 1994	61 km^{2} (24 sq mi)	115,043	9	
City of Melbourne	Melbourne	12 August 1842	37 km^{2} (14 sq mi)	149,615	11	
City of Melton	Melton	16 September 1862	528 km^{2} (204 sq mi)	178,960	9	
City of Merri-bek	Coburg	22 June 1994	51 km^{2} (20 sq mi)	171,357	11	
City of Monash	Glen Waverley	15 December 1994	82 km^{2} (32 sq mi)	190,397	11	
City of Moonee Valley	Moonee Ponds	15 December 1994	43 km^{2} (17 sq mi)	121,851	9	
Shire of Mornington Peninsula	Rosebud	15 December 1994	724 km^{2} (280 sq mi)	168,948	11	
Shire of Nillumbik	Greensborough	15 December 1994	432 km^{2} (167 sq mi)	62,895	7	
City of Port Phillip	St Kilda	22 June 1994	21 km^{2} (8.1 sq mi)	101,942	9	
City of Stonnington	Malvern	22 June 1994	26 km^{2} (10 sq mi)	104,703	9	
City of Whitehorse	Nunawading	15 December 1994	64 km^{2} (25 sq mi)	169,346	11	
City of Whittlesea	South Morang	12 December 1862	490 km^{2} (190 sq mi)	229,396	11	
City of Wyndham	Werribee	6 October 1862	542 km^{2} (209 sq mi)	292,011	11	
City of Yarra	Richmond	22 June 1994	20 km^{2} (7.7 sq mi)	90,114	9	
Yarra Ranges Shire	Lilydale	15 December 1994	2,468 km^{2} (953 sq mi)	156,068	9	

=== Regional Victoria ===
Map of LGAs in regional Victoria

==== Barwon South West ====
Local government area	Council seat	Date established	Land area		Population		Councillors (2022)	Map
Local government area	Council seat	Date established	km^{2}	sq mi	(2013)	(2021)	Councillors (2022)	Map
Colac Otway Shire	Colac	1994	3,438	1,327	21,035	22,423	7	
Corangamite Shire	Camperdown	1994	4,408	1,702	16,410	16,115	7	
Shire of Glenelg	Portland	1994	6,219	2,401	19,797	20,152	7	
City of Greater Geelong	Geelong	1993	1,248	482	223,357	271,057	11	
Shire of Moyne	Port Fairy	1994	5,482	2,117	16,431	17,374	7	
Borough of Queenscliffe	Queenscliff	1863	8.6	3	3,002	3,276	5	
Shire of Southern Grampians	Hamilton	1994	6,654	2,569	16,355	16,588	7	
Surf Coast Shire	Torquay	1994	1,553	600	28,228	37,694	9	
City of Warrnambool	Warrnambool	1855	121	47	33,423	35,406	7	

==== Grampians ====
Local government area	Council seat	Date established	Land area		Population		Councillors (2022)	Map
Local government area	Council seat	Date established	km^{2}	sq mi	(2013)	(2021)	Councillors (2022)	Map
Rural City of Ararat	Ararat	1994	4,211	1,626	11,490	11,880	7	
City of Ballarat	Ballarat	1994	739	285	98,344	113,763	9	
Golden Plains Shire	Bannockburn	1994	2,703	1,044	20,362	24,985	7	
Shire of Hepburn	Daylesford	1995	1,473	569	15,022	16,604	7	
Shire of Hindmarsh	Nhill	1995	7,524	2,905	5,852	5,698	6	
Rural City of Horsham	Horsham	1995	4,267	1,647	19,694	20,429	7	
Shire of Moorabool	Ballan	1994	2,111	815	30,410	37,632	7	
Shire of Northern Grampians	Stawell	1995	5,730	2,212	11,880	11,948	7	
Pyrenees Shire	Beaufort	1994	3,435	1,326	6,938	7,671	5	
Shire of West Wimmera	Edenhope	1995	9,108	3,517	4,124	4,006	5	
Shire of Yarriambiack	Warracknabeal	1995	7,326	2,829	7,032	6,556	7	

==== Gippsland ====
Local government area	Council seat	Date established	Land area		Population		Councillors (2022)	Map
Local government area	Council seat	Date established	km^{2}	sq mi	(2013)	(2021)	Councillors (2022)	Map
Bass Coast Shire	Wonthaggi	1994	866	334	31,331	40,789	9	
Shire of Baw Baw	Warragul	1994	4,028	1,555	45,627	57,626	9	
Shire of East Gippsland	Bairnsdale	1994	20,940	8,085	43,809	48,715	9	
City of Latrobe	Morwell	1994	1,426	551	74,124	77,318	9	
South Gippsland Shire	Leongatha	1994	3,435	1,326	28,273	30,577	9	
Shire of Wellington	Sale	1994	10,817	4,176	42,721	45,639	9	

==== Hume ====
Local government area	Council seat	Date established	Land area		Population		Councillors (2022)	Map
Local government area	Council seat	Date established	km^{2}	sq mi	(2013)	(2021)	Councillors (2022)	Map
Alpine Shire	Bright	1994	4,788	1,849	12,283	13,235	7	
Rural City of Benalla	Benalla	2002	2,353	908	13,878	14,528	7	
City of Greater Shepparton	Shepparton	1994	2,422	935	63,244	68,409	9	
Shire of Indigo	Beechworth	1994	2,040	788	15,605	17,368	7	
Shire of Mansfield	Mansfield	2002	3,844	1,484	8,276	10,178	5	
Shire of Mitchell	Broadford	1994	2,862	1,105	37,788	49,460	9	
Shire of Moira	Cobram	1994	4,046	1,562	25,401	30,522	9	
Shire of Murrindindi	Alexandra	1994	3,880	1,498	13,563	15,197	7	
Shire of Strathbogie	Euroa	1994	3,303	1,275	9,119	11,455	7	
Shire of Towong	Tallangatta	1994	6,675	2,577	5,961	6,223	5	
Rural City of Wangaratta	Wangaratta	1997	3,645	1,407	27,650	29,808	7	
City of Wodonga	Wodonga	1876	433	167	37,575	43,253	7	

==== Loddon Mallee ====
Local government area	Council seat	Date established	Land area		Population		Councillors (2022)	Map
Local government area	Council seat	Date established	km^{2}	sq mi	(2013)	(2021)	Councillors (2022)	Map
Shire of Buloke	Wycheproof	1995	8,000	3,089	6,388	6,178	7	
Shire of Campaspe	Echuca	1994	4,519	1,745	37,213	38,735	9	
Shire of Central Goldfields	Maryborough	1995	1,533	592	12,815	13,483	7	
Shire of Gannawarra	Kerang	1995	3,735	1,442	10,526	10,683	7	
City of Greater Bendigo	Bendigo	1994	3,000	1,158	105,957	121,470	9	
Shire of Loddon	Wedderburn	1995	6,696	2,585	7,518	7,759	5	
Shire of Macedon Ranges	Kyneton	1994	1,748	675	44,595	51,458	9	
Rural City of Mildura	Mildura	1995	22,083	8,526	53,156	56,972	9	
Shire of Mount Alexander	Castlemaine	1995	1,530	591	18,247	20,253	7	
Rural City of Swan Hill	Swan Hill	1995	6,115	2,361	21,003	21,403	7	

== Former local government areas ==
This is a list of former local government areas in Victoria. Many of these existed from the 19th century until the 1994 statewide local government amalgamations.

=== Greater Melbourne ===
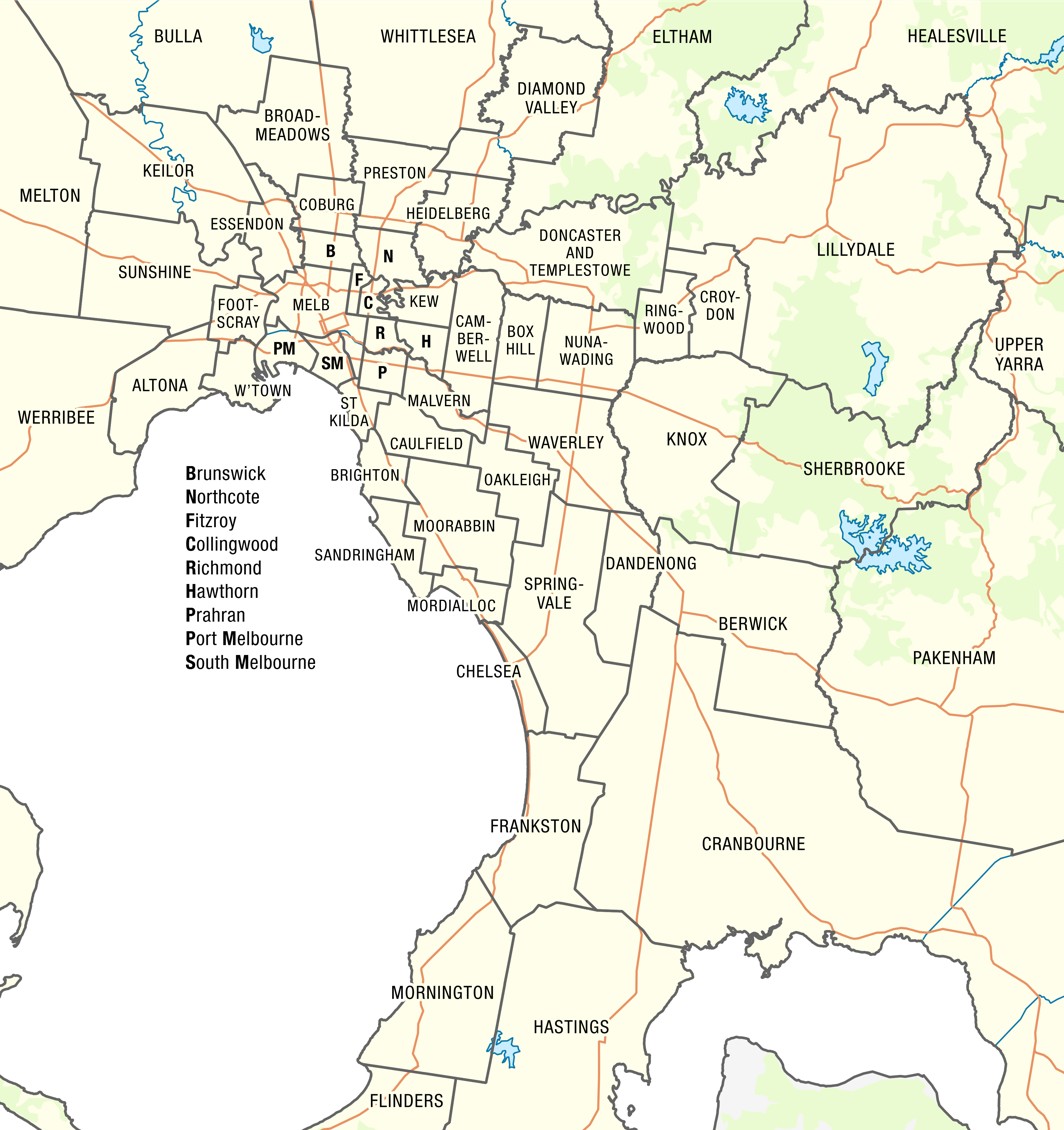
Map of local government areas in Greater Melbourne in 1993

This is a list of former local government areas in what is now considered Greater Melbourne. Some of these local government areas were not considered part of Greater Melbourne at the time of their dissolution.

Local government area	Date established	Date dissolved	Amalgamated into:
City of Altona	20 February 1957	22 June 1994	City of Hobsons Bay
City of Berwick	1 October 1973	15 December 1994	City of Casey; City of Greater Dandenong
City of Box Hill	7 August 1857	15 December 1994	City of Whitehorse
City of Brighton	18 January 1859	15 December 1994	City of Bayside
City of Broadmeadows	27 November 1857	15 December 1994	City of Hume; City of Merri-bek
City of Brunswick	29 September 1857	22 June 1994	City of Merri-bek
Shire of Bulla	16 September 1862	15 December 1994	City of Hume
City of Camberwell	11 July 1864	22 June 1994	City of Boroondara
City of Caulfield	17 April 1871	15 December 1994	City of Glen Eira
City of Chelsea	1 May 1920	15 December 1994	City of Kingston
City of Coburg	1859	15 December 1994	City of Merri-bek; City of Darebin
City of Collingwood	24 April 1855	22 June 1994	City of Yarra
City of Cranbourne	6 March 1868	15 December 1994	City of Casey; City of Frankston; City of Greater Dandenong; Bass Coast Shire; Shire of Mornington Peninsula
City of Croydon	24 May 1961	15 December 1994	City of Maroondah
City of Dandenong	1857	15 December 1994	City of Greater Dandenong
Shire of Diamond Valley	30 September 1964	15 December 1994	City of Banyule; Shire of Nillumbik; City of Darebin
City of Doncaster & Templestowe	19 December 1856	15 December 1994	City of Manningham
City of Essendon	27 December 1861	15 December 1994	City of Moonee Valley
Shire of Eltham	26 September 1856	15 December 1994	Shire of Nillumbik; Shire of Murrindindi; City of Banyule
City of Fitzroy	10 September 1858	22 June 1994	City of Yarra
Borough of Flemington and Kensington	17 March 1882	30 October 1905	City of Melbourne
Shire of Flinders	24 December 1874	15 December 1994	Shire of Mornington Peninsula
City of Footscray	10 June 1859	15 December 1994	City of Maribyrnong; City of Hobsons Bay
City of Frankston (former)	6 November 1860	15 December 1994	City of Frankston (new); Shire of Mornington Peninsula
Shire of Hastings	19 October 1960	15 December 1994	Shire of Mornington Peninsula
City of Hawthorn	27 July 1860	22 June 1994	City of Boroondara
Shire of Healesville	30 September 1887	15 December 1994	Shire of Yarra Ranges; Shire of Nillumbik
City of Heidelberg	1840	15 December 1994	City of Banyule; City of Darebin
City of Keilor	3 March 1863	15 December 1994	City of Brimbank; City of Moonee Valley; City of Hume
City of Kew	19 December 1860	22 June 1994	City of Boroondara
Shire of Lillydale	19 September 1856	15 December 1994	Shire of Yarra Ranges
City of Malvern	17 October 1856	22 June 1994	City of Stonnington
City of Moorabbin	27 February 1871	15 December 1994	City of Glen Eira; City of Bayside; City of Kingston
City of Mordialloc	26 May 1920	15 December 1994	City of Kingston; City of Bayside
Shire of Mornington	31 May 1893	15 December 1994	Shire of Mornington Peninsula
Town of North Melbourne	30 September 1859	30 October 1905	City of Melbourne
City of Northcote	25 May 1883	22 June 1994	City of Darebin; City of Yarra
City of Nunawading	26 May 1925	15 December 1994	City of Whitehorse
City of Oakleigh	13 March 1891	15 December 1994	City of Monash; City of Kingston
Shire of Pakenham	24 October 1862	15 December 1994	Shire of Cardinia
City of Port Melbourne	13 July 1860	22 June 1994	City of Port Phillip
City of Prahran	24 April 1855	22 June 1994	City of Stonnington; City of Port Phillip
City of Preston	8 November 1871	22 June 1994	City of Darebin
City of Richmond	24 April 1855	22 June 1994	City of Yarra
City of Ringwood	22 October 1924	15 December 1994	City of Maroondah
City of Sandringham	28 February 1917	15 December 1994	City of Bayside
Shire of Sherbrooke	23 May 1889	15 December 1994	Shire of Yarra Ranges; Shire of Cardinia; City of Knox
City of South Melbourne	26 May 1855	22 June 1994	City of Port Phillip
City of Springvale	6 February 1857	15 December 1994	City of Greater Dandenong; City of Kingston
City of St Kilda	24 April 1855	22 June 1994	City of Port Phillip
City of Sunshine	28 May 1860	15 December 1994	City of Brimbank; City of Maribyrnong
Shire of Upper Yarra	19 October 1888	15 December 1994	Shire of Yarra Ranges
City of Waverley	1 January 1857	15 December 1994	City of Monash
City of Williamstown	14 March 1856	22 June 1994	City of Hobsons Bay

=== Regional Victoria ===
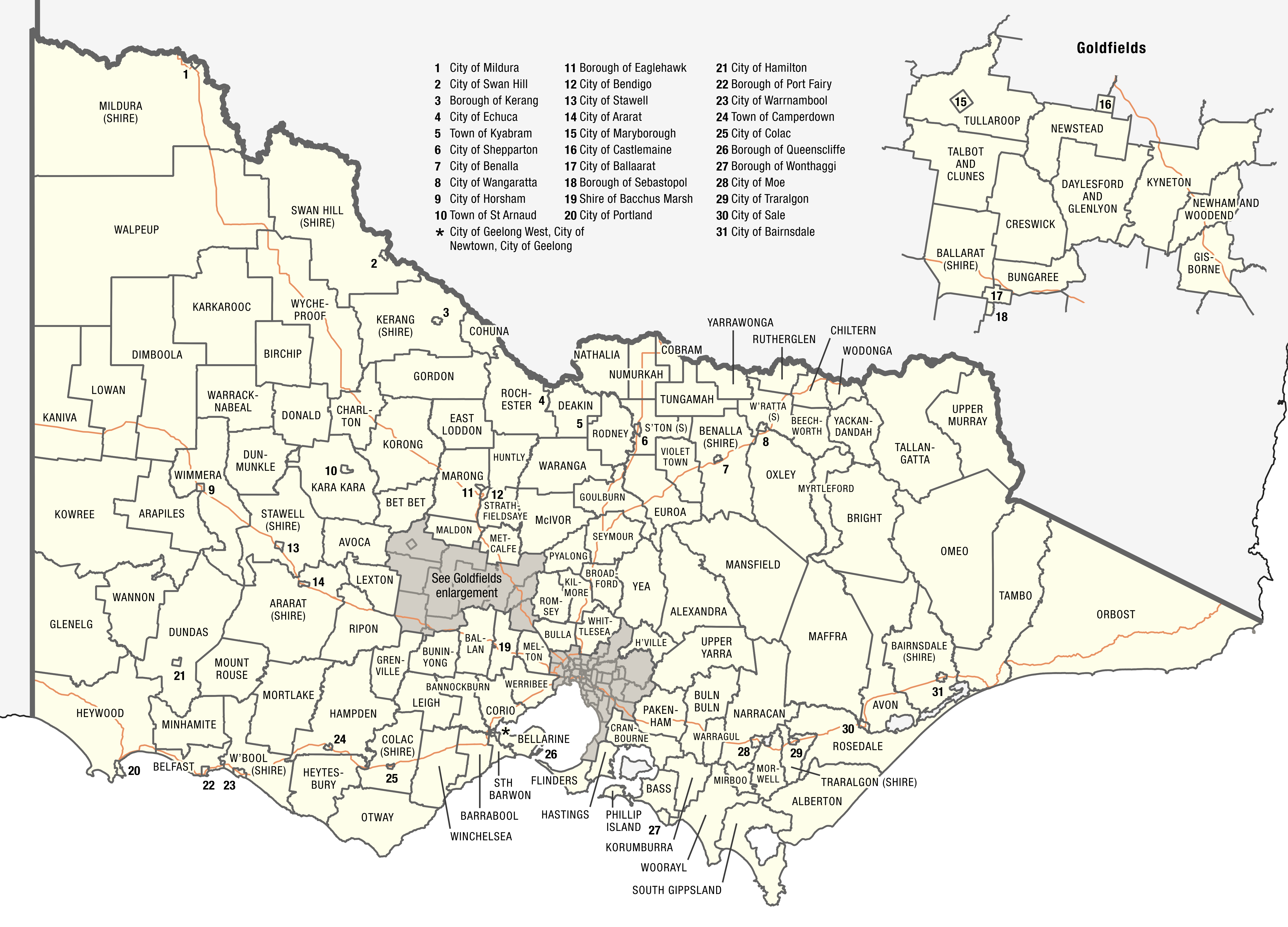
Map of local government areas in Victoria in 1993

== See also ==
- Government of Australia
- Australian Local Government Association
- Municipal Association of Victoria
