= Australian rules football playing field =

Explanation of Australian rules football ground markings

An Australian rules football playing field is a venue where Australian rules football is played.

The playing field is typically a large oval-shaped grass surface, usually a modified cricket field, hence often known as an oval. These fields may vary especially for variations of the game. However, for official Australian Football League matches, strict requirement specifications must be met for stadiums.

While the modern game is defined by its oval playing surface, the code was originally contested on rectangular rugby orientated fields, until the late 1870s when Victoria's prominent clubs began to play matches on enclosed cricket grounds, utilising the full dimensions available.

== Standard specifications ==
=== Ground dimensions ===
Australian rules football grounds, even at the highest level of the game, have no fixed dimensions. For senior football, the playing field is an oval between 135–185 metres (148–202 yd) long goal-to-goal and 110–155 metres (120–170 yd) wide wing-to-wing. Grounds can vary from long and narrow to almost circular, and are not necessarily symmetrical, depending upon how and where the field was constructed. At least 5 metres (5.5 yd) of space between the boundary line and any fence is required for safety.

Smaller fields are generally used for junior football; some are purpose-built, and some are temporarily marked out within the confines of full-sized oval; as for a senior match, there are no fixed dimensions for a junior-sized field. The Western Australian Football Commission advises that a good rule of thumb is to set the length of the field equivalent to 3 1/2 times the length of an average kick of the age group playing.

By definition in the laws of the game, the portion of the field inside the goal line and boundary lines is called the playing surface. The combination of the playing surface and the space between the boundary line and any perimeter fence, as well as any gaps in the perimeter fence, is called the arena.

=== Ground markings ===
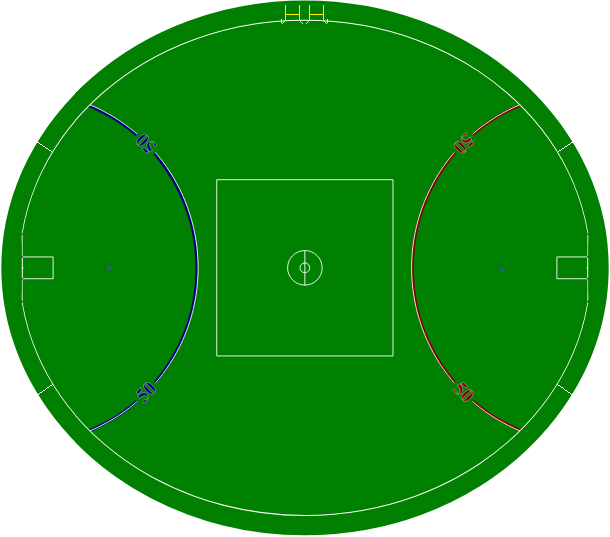
Diagram of a professional level Australian rules football field, 2021

A top-level Australian rules football ground has the following markings:

- Two goal-lines, one at each end of the field, which are straight and 19.2 m (21 yd) long, and contain the goal posts and behind posts. This the area through which points are scored.
- Two boundary lines, which are curved around the edge of the field and connect the two goal-lines. Together, the boundary-lines and the goal-lines mark out the playing area, in a slightly truncated oval.
- Two goal squares, one at each end of the field, which are 6.4 m × 9 m (7 yd × 10 yd) in front of each goal-face. The line parallel to the goal line is called the kick-off line. This marks out the area from which a kick-in is taken.
- The imaginary continuation of the kick-off line in both directions is called the nine-metre line; it is not marked, but radial markings outside the boundary line, two at each end of the ground, indicate where the nine-metre line crosses the boundary line. The position of a mark or free kick taken on the defensive side of this line is always advanced to it.
- Two blue dots, 15 m (16 yd) in front of the centre of each kick-off line, indicating where the man on the mark stands for a kick-in. Many suburban fields will not include this dot.
- The centre square, which is 50 m × 50 m (55 yd × 55 yd) in the centre of the ground.
- The centre circles: two concentric circles of 3 m (3.3 yd) and 10 m (11 yd) diameter, with a line bisecting them running wing-to-wing. These markings dictate where the ruckmen and other midfielders can stand during a centre bounce. 1 player from each team is required to be in the centre circle at the beginning of each quarter and after each goal.
- Two fifty-metre arcs: a circular arc at each end of the field drawn between the boundary lines at a distance of 50 m (55 yd) from the centre of the goal-line, one red-and-white, and one blue-and-white. Originally introduced as a visual indicator of distance only, these markings now dictate starting positions for forwards and defenders at a centre bounce. Some competitions and exhibition games also allow for super goals, which score more points for a goal kicked from long range. 6 players from each team are required to be in each fifty-metre arc, with one of these from each team required to be in the goal square, at the beginning of each quarter and after each goal.
- Interchange gates: a series of yellow and white markings on the boundary line near the teams' interchange benches, which dictate where players may enter and exit the ground for interchanges.

Grounds at lower or junior levels will lack many of these markings, or paint them in lower detail.

=== Goal posts ===
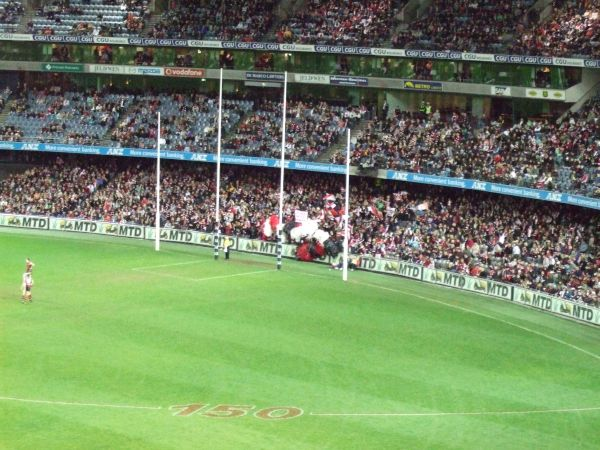
The goal and behind posts. Also note the painted 50 meter arc and goal square.

At each end of the ground there are two goal posts, spaced 6.4 m (7 yd) apart, and a further 6.4 m (7 yd) on either side of these are behind posts, 5 metres (16 ft) in height. The goal posts are conventionally painted white, and in South Australia, the behind posts are customarily painted red. All posts are typically padded with wall padding to minimise injury due to players colliding with them.

=== Surface ===
Due to possible injuries caused to players moving at high speed by marking, jumping, turning and being tackled without protective padding, the playing field standards imply use of lawn as a surface.

== Purpose-built stadiums ==
Almost all Australian rules football fields are of a suitable size and shape for cricket; and in the majority of cases, the fields are used for cricket in the summer and Australian rules football in the winter, a seasonal strategy which is part of the history of Australian sport. As a consequence of this, there are relatively few fields which were purpose-built for and used by Australian rules football to the exclusion of cricket and all other sports. Like the cricket oval, the field is usually referred to and named as an oval.

However, there are numerous grounds – particularly those built more recently – which were built with Australian rules football as the primary intended purpose, but upon which other sports, including cricket, have been played.

Stadium	Location	Opened	Built for	Capacity at construction	Comments
Whitten Oval	West Footscray, Victoria	1886	City of Footscray	unknown	
Yarraville Oval	Yarraville, Victoria	1903	Ground trustees, Yarraville Football Club	unknown	
Glenferrie Oval	Hawthorn, Victoria	1905	City of Hawthorn	unknown	
North Hobart Oval	North Hobart, Tasmania	1921	City of Hobart	unknown	Opened to other sports in 1957
Linkbelt Oval	Aiwo, Nauru	1924	Government of Nauru	3,000	First dedicated ground outside of Australia. Now also hosts soccer and cricket
Trevor Barker Beach Oval	Sandringham, Victoria	1929	City of Sandringham	unknown	
Gardens Oval	Darwin, Northern Territory	1950	City of Darwin, Northern Territory Football League	unknown	Built to replace the old Darwin Oval. Opened up to soccer and rugby in 1953. Less used after construction of Marrarra Oval, became a primarily cricket oval in 2002
Moorabbin Oval	Moorabbin, Victoria	1952	City of Moorabbin, Moorabbin Football Club	unknown	
Cazalys Stadium	Cairns, Queensland	1957	Australian National Football Council		Used by some other sports since 2001
Richmond Oval	Adelaide, South Australia	1958	West Adelaide Football Club	16,500	Has also hosted American football
Skinner Reserve	Braybrook, Victoria	1966	Victorian Football Association		Has been opened to other sports since 1989
Football Park	West Lakes, South Australia	1974	South Australian National Football League	60,000	Hosted World Series Cricket matches
Waverley Park	Mulgrave, Victoria	1970	Victorian Football League	78,000	Hosted World Series Cricket matches
Carrara Stadium	Gold Coast, Queensland	1987	Brisbane Bears, Shire of Albert	15,000	Opened to other sports in 1988
Marrara Oval	Darwin, Northern Territory	1991	Northern Territory Football League, Government of the Northern Territory	12,500	Opened to other sports since 2003
Docklands Stadium	Melbourne Docklands, Victoria	2000	Australian Football League	53,000	Primarily for Australian rules football, but regularly hosts other football codes, concerts and cricket
Casey Fields VFL Oval	Cranbourne, Victoria	2006	City of Casey	15,000	Other ovals in the complex are used for cricket
Humber College Australian Football Oval	Toronto, Canada	2010	Humber College	-	First purpose built venue in the Americas. Hosted the 49th Parallel Cup and 2024 Transatlantic Cup
Tianjin Oval	Tianjin, China	2011	Melbourne Football Club, City of Melbourne, Australian Football League	N/A	Was never used and abandoned and derelict in 2014
Moreton Bay Central Sports Complex (AFL Oval)	Burpengary, Queensland	2013	Moreton Bay Region	6,500	With contributions from AFL's Australian Football Facilities Fund
Maroochydore Multi Sports Complex (AFL Oval)	Maroochydore, Queensland	2013	Sunshine Coast Council	5,000	With contributions from AFL's Australian Football Facilities Fund
South Pine Sports Complex (AFL Oval)	Brendale, Queensland	2017	South Pine Sports Association	3,000	With contributions from AFL's Australian Football Facilities Fund
Nathan Road Sports Complex (AFL Oval)	Newport, Queensland	2020	Moreton Bay Region	unknown	With contributions from AFL's Australian Football Facilities Fund
Zagreb Australian Football ground	Zagreb, Croatia 45.78675°N 15.94367°E	2021	University of Zagreb	N/A	First purpose built ground in Europe. Hosted the 2022 AFL Europe Championship
Springfield Central Stadium	Springfield Central, Queensland 27.67230°S 152.90424°E	2022	City of Ipswich, Brisbane Lions	10,000	First purpose built women's sports field in Australia. With contributions from AFL's Australian Football Facilities Fund
Everleigh AFL Oval	Greenbank, Queensland 27.74029°S 152.99265°E	2024	City of Logan	unknown	With contributions from AFL's Australian Football Facilities Fund

== Variations ==
Variations of the standard field dimensions and layout exist. For junior levels, smaller fields are often used. Rectangular fields have also been used in the past in Australia and also overseas, as well as adapted fields from other sports such as association football and American football.
