= Oakleigh South, Victoria =

Oakleigh South
- Suburb
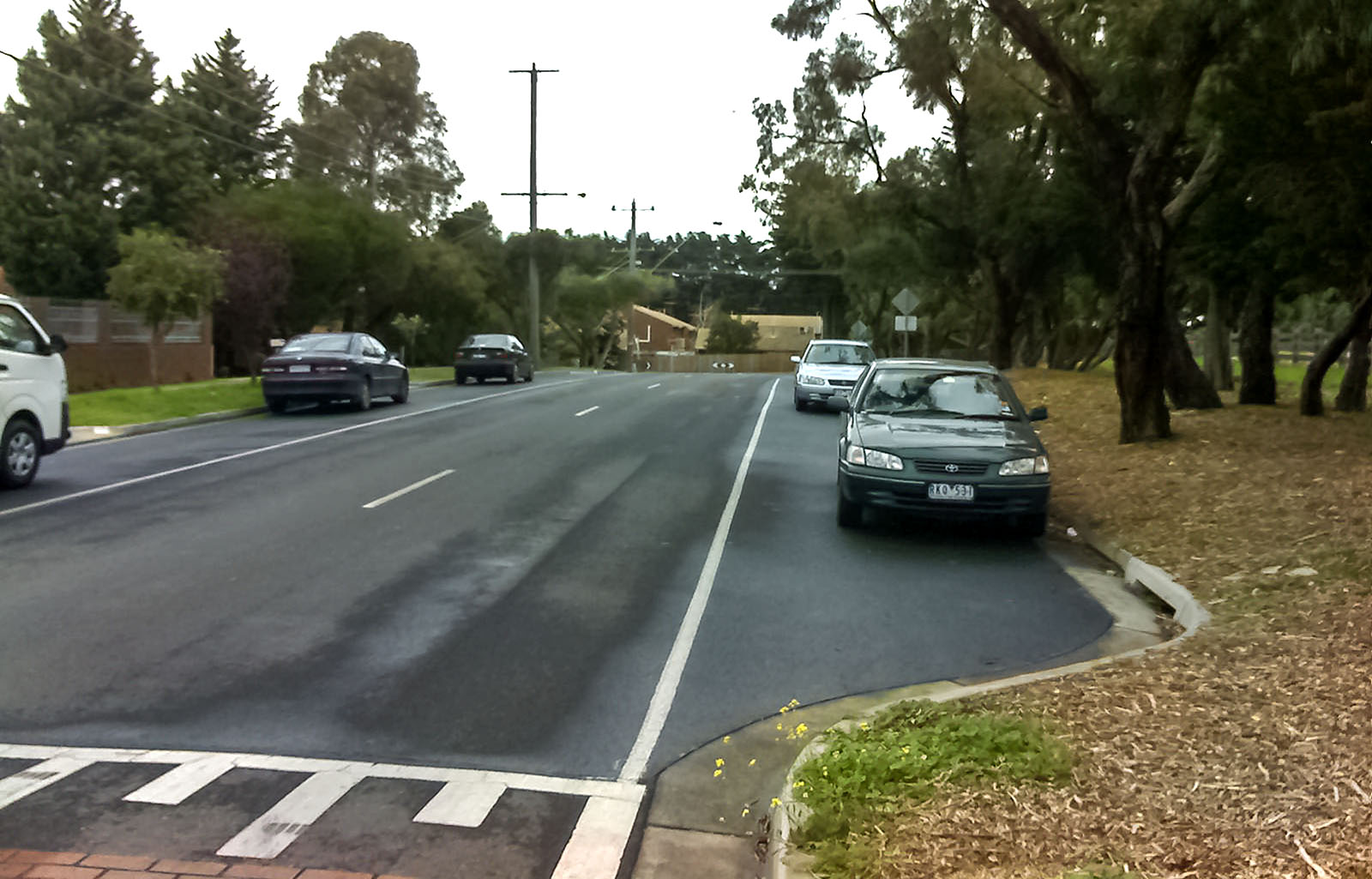
- Carroll Road

- Interactive map of Oakleigh South
- Coordinates: 37.917°S 145.09°E
- Country: Australia
- State: Victoria
- City: Melbourne
- LGAs: City of Kingston; City of Monash
- Location: 17 km (11 mi) from Melbourne

Government
  - State electorate: Clarinda
  - Federal division: Hotham

Area
  - Total: 6.6 km^{2} (2.5 sq mi)
- Elevation: 58 m (190 ft)

Population
  - Total: 9,851 (SAL 2021)
- Postcode: 3167
Suburbs around Oakleigh South
| Hughesdale | Oakleigh | Clayton |
| Bentleigh East | Oakleigh South | Clarinda |
| Moorabbin | Heatherton | Clarinda |

Oakleigh South is a suburb in Melbourne, Victoria, Australia, 17 km south-east of the Melbourne central business district, located within the Cities of Kingston and Monash local government areas. Oakleigh South recorded a population of 9,851 at the 2021 census.

A largely residential suburb, its boundaries are North Road to the north, Dingley Bypass to the south, Warrigal Road to the west and Huntingdale/Clarinda Roads to the east.

Oakleigh South Post Office opened on 1 September 1936.

== History ==
Following World War II, Melbourne burst its borders and flowed into semi-rural land. The suburbs Moorabbin and Oakleigh expanded to the south-east. The end of World War II also saw an Australian government attitudinal change with regards to immigration. In the 1950s and 1960s, the Australian government formed agreements with many European countries and actively encouraged immigrants from southern and northern Europe. Many southern European migrants settled first in Melbourne’s inner suburbs such as Carlton and Brunswick, but as they became more financially established, and more family and friends arrived, many sought to purchase or build larger homes. Land in developing suburbs such as Oakleigh South provided an ideal opportunity for larger house blocks. Many people chose to build their own houses and local industries provided employment for many of the first generation of Greek and Italian settlers.

== Education ==
Oakleigh South has two primary schools, Oakleigh South Primary School and Huntingdale Primary Bilingual School. The two spoken languages are English and Japanese. Oakleigh South has one secondary school, South Oakleigh Secondary College.

The Melbourne International School of Japanese, a supplementary Japanese school, holds its classes at Oakleigh South Primary.

== Transport ==
Oakleigh South is serviced by Huntingdale railway station.

As part of the Dingley Arterial Project, Old Dandenong Road was connected to South Road, thereby linking suburbs west of Oakleigh South along South Road (such as Bentleigh, Moorabbin, and Brighton) with suburbs to the east of Oakleigh South along Old Dandenong Road (such as Heatherton and Dingley Village).

== Sports ==
Located in southeastern Melbourne's famous Sandbelt, the area is home to three noted private golf clubs: Metropolitan Golf Club, Huntingdale Golf Club and Commonwealth Golf Club.

The Olympic Ice Skating Centre, located on Centre Road at the middle of Oakleigh South, is the oldest ice rink in Melbourne, opened on 7 July 1971. It was the only public ice rink in Melbourne until the opening of Docklands' Icehouse in 12 February 2010, and was where the Melbourne Ice of the Australian Ice Hockey League previously played up until 2009.

== Parks ==
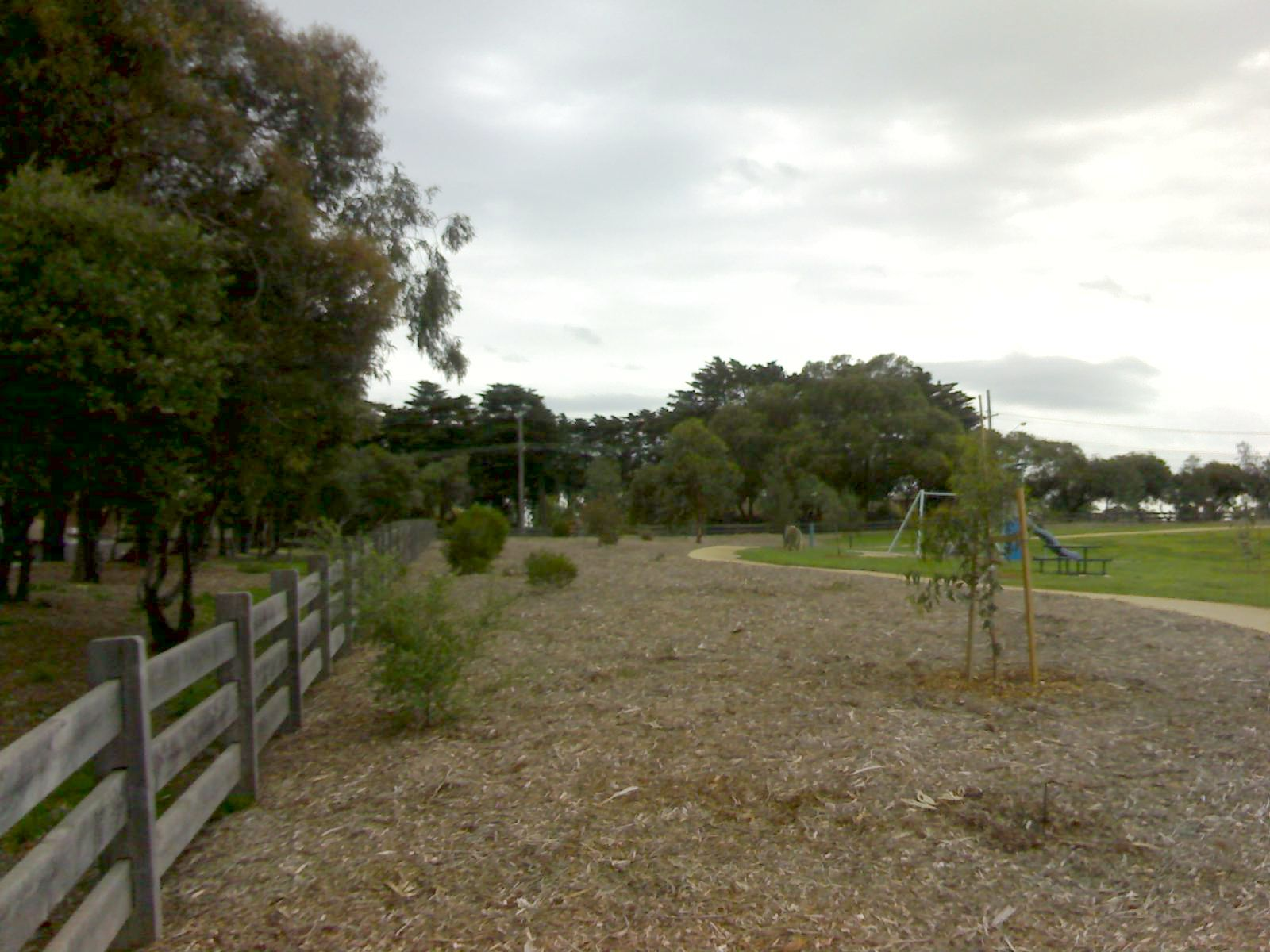
Mavis Hutter Reserve

After the completion of the South Road Extension, Mavis Hutter Reserve was created at the corner of Carroll Road and Bourke Road. The park contains two workstations of outdoor gym equipment, a playground, and a granitic sand track. The playground comprises a slide, swings, and butterfly sculpture. The granitic sand creates a circuit in the park.

Other parks in Oakleigh South are Scammell Reserve, which contains sporting facilities and playgrounds, Dales and Talbot Parks, and Davies Reserve.

The National Trust of Australia has more than 1,000 trees listed on its significant tree register. One of these trees is a flowering gum outside the Metropolitan Golf Club's clubhouse in Oakleigh South.

== Demographics ==
According to the Australian Taxation Office, the mean yearly taxable income for an Oakleigh South resident is $42,622, which is higher than the Australian average of $39,719. However, even though Oakleigh South residents earn more than the national average, they pay less in income taxes. The average Australian pays $11,554 per year in income taxes while the average Oakleigh South resident pays $9,680 per year in income taxes.

The Australian Bureau of Statistics reveals the following demographic facts about Oakleigh South:

- The proportion of households in Oakleigh South where Greek is the main language spoken is 14.2 per cent compared to the Australian average of 1.3 per cent. The proportion of households where Italian is the main language is 4.7 per cent compared to the Australian average of 1.6 per cent.
- Many in Oakleigh South fully own their own home. The proportion of houses that are fully owned (occupant does not pay rent or mortgage) in Oakleigh South is 42.2 per cent compared to the Australian average of 32.6 per cent.
- There are relatively few flats, units, or apartments. Most Oakleigh South residents own separate houses. In Oakleigh South, 3.4 per cent of dwellings are flats, units, or apartments compared to the Australian average of 14.2 per cent.

== Livability ==
A 2005 report called Livable Melbourne that was commissioned by The Age and conducted by Tract Consultants and ACIL Tasman, ranked Melbourne suburbs and assigned them scores on fourteen characteristics such as crime, CBD proximity, and traffic congestion. The report found that Oakleigh South had a very low crime rate and good proximity to cafes, restaurants, and shopping facilities. Negative characteristics of Oakleigh South include lack of trams, poor proximity to schools, lack of open spaces, and little topographical variation.

== Places of Worship ==
The Sankat Mochan Samiti temple on North Road conducts Hindu ceremonies and services while the South Oakleigh Gospel Hall on Centre Road conducts Sunday schools and Christian services.

== See also ==
- City of Moorabbin – Parts of Oakleigh South were previously within this former local government area.
- City of Oakleigh – Parts of Oakleigh South were previously within this former local government area.
- Oakleigh Barracks
