= Shire of Mulgrave =

The name Shire of Mulgrave refers to one of two historic local government areas in Australia:

- The Shire of Mulgrave (Victoria), a former local government area in Victoria, Australia, later City of Waverley
- The Shire of Mulgrave (Queensland), a former local government area in Queensland, Australia, later City of Cairns
