= Billy Spears =

Australian rules footballer

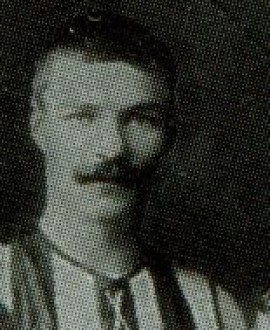
- Spears in 1903

Personal information
- Full name: William Henry Spears
- Born: 29 July 1877; Cheltenham, Victoria
- Died: 18 August 1957 (aged 80); Oakleigh, Victoria
- Original team: Camberwell Rovers
- Height: 180 cm (5 ft 11 in)
- Weight: 78 kg (172 lb)

Playing career^{1}
Years	Club	Games (Goals)
1901	Carlton	1 (0)
1903	Collingwood	6 (2)
Total		7 (2)
- ^{1} Playing statistics correct to the end of 1903.

William Henry Spears (29 July 1877 – 18 August 1957) was an Australian rules footballer who played with Carlton and Collingwood in the Victorian Football League (VFL).

He served in the Boer War in 1899 with the Fifth (Mounted Rifles) Contingent, and was back in Melbourne by April 1902. He began playing with Collingwood Juniors soon after.
