= Oakwood Park Primary School =

Oakwood School

Location
- Noble Park North, Melbourne, Victoria; Australia
- Coordinates: 37°57′38″S 145°11′25″E

Information
- Type: Government school co-educational Secondary school
- Status: 'Open
- Principal: Paul Newson
- Color: Green
- Website: www.oakwoodschool.vic.edu.au

Oakwood School is a government school which was created to enrol students who have stopped attending school. The school operates over a range of sites across the Southern, South-East and Mornington Peninsula areas.
