= Hughesdale, Victoria =

Hughesdale
- Suburb
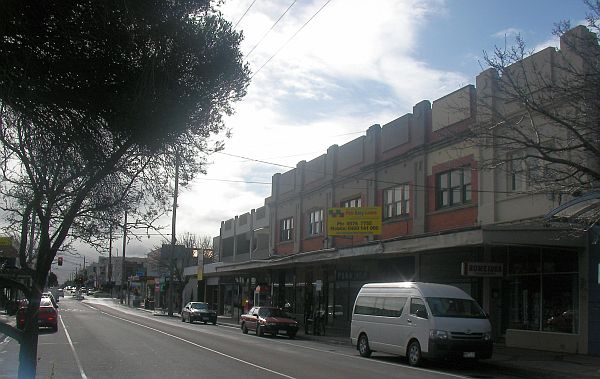
- Poath Road Village shopping centre is the heart of suburban Hughesdale and retains a distinctively interwar character

- Interactive map of Hughesdale
- Coordinates: 37.894°S 145.085°E
- Country: Australia
- State: Victoria
- City: Melbourne
- LGA: City of Monash
- Location: 14 km (8.7 mi) from Melbourne

Government
  - State electorate: Oakleigh
  - Federal division: Hotham

Area
  - Total: 2 km^{2} (0.77 sq mi)
- Elevation: 53 m (174 ft)

Population
  - Total: 7,563 (SAL 2021)
- Postcode: 3166
Suburbs around Hughesdale
Malvern East	Malvern East	Chadstone
Murrumbeena	Hughesdale	Oakleigh
Bentleigh East	Bentleigh East	Oakleigh South

Hughesdale is a suburb in Melbourne, Victoria, Australia, 14 km south-east of Melbourne's Central Business District, located within the City of Monash local government area. Hughesdale recorded a population of 7,563 at the 2021 census.

Hughesdale is bordered by Poath Road to the west, Dandenong Road to the north, Warrigal Road to the east and North Road to the south.

It is named after James Vincent Hughes, former mayor of City of Oakleigh who lobbied heavily for a new station for the area in the mid-1920s.

== History ==
Hughesdale began, not as a Melbourne suburb, but as a suburban area of Oakleigh along the railway line between it and Murrumbeena. In the 1880s, due to the presence of the railway the stretch of land attracted some professionals who established substantial homes on large estates. Many of its earliest homes are part of Oakleigh and Murrumbeena's early history. The original township was laid out around Poath Road with small lanes, some cobbled in bluestone.

James Vincent Hughes, mayor of City of Oakleigh from 1924 to 1925 lobbied heavily with the Poath Road Railway Station League for a new railway station for the area. In 1924 the League suggested the station be called "Hugheston", but in February 1925, shortly before the station opened, Victorian Railways decided its name would be "Hughesdale". A decade later there was a move to rename Poath Road "Hughesdale Road", but this was rejected by the then Caulfield City Council.

Following the opening of railway station on 28 February 1925 the suburb boomed with a commercial area rapidly springing up near the station along Poath Road and subdivision of sparse land between Murrumbeena and Oakleigh for residential development.

Hughesdale Post Office opened on 12 December 1927.

Rapid industrialisation and expansion of both Melbourne and Oakleigh in the 1940s saw Hughesdale become entrenched as a Melbourne suburb and commuter zone. Hughesdale inherited the modified grid plan of neighbouring suburbs and the original Victorian era estates were converted to greenfield land eventually making way for affordable working class housing developments.

With the opening of Chadstone Shopping Centre in the 1960s, Hughesdale completed its suburban expansion and became the main rail access point for the centre, however it also began a long steep decline in the local commercial area's trading.

Hughesdale was defined as a Neighbourhood Activity Centre in the Melbourne 2030 strategy. This and the formation of a local traders' association which rebranded the commercial area "Poath Road Village" has stimulated a revival in the commercial area. As a result, several mixed use buildings of 2 or more storeys have been developed along Poath Road near the railway station. It became a particular popular area with its mix of cafes and boutique shops.

== Street names ==
Many street names in the suburb were named after notable British train stations. These include Rugby Road, Euston Road, Crewe Road, Swindon Road, Paddington Road, Clapham Road, Bletchley Road, Willesden Road, Carlisle Crescent, Preston Road, Skipton Road, Dalston Road, Camden Road, Earlstown Road.

Among other street names are:

- Corr Street: Named after E.J. Corr, Oakleigh mayor, 1907-8 and 1916–17;
- Darling Street: Named after Sir Charles Henry Darling, Governor of Victoria, 1863–1866;
- Hotham Street: Named after Sir Charles Hotham, Governor of Victoria, 1854–1855;
- Paget Street: Named after local resident and hotelier Charles Edwin Paget (d. 1936)

== Demographics and housing ==
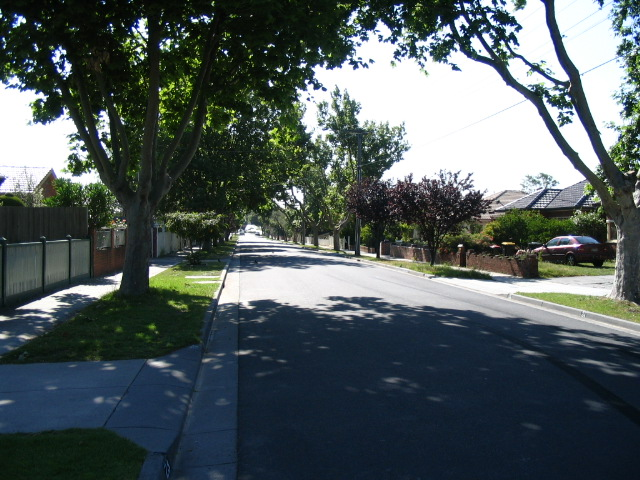
Euston Road, a typical residential street in the suburb

In the 2016 Census, there were 7,556 people in Hughesdale. The median age of people in Hughesdale was 35 years. Children 0 – 14 years made up 17.4% of the population and those aged 65 years and over made up 13.5% of the population.

54.8% of people were born in Australia. The next most common countries of birth were China (excludes SARs and Taiwan) 7.7%, India 6.8%, Greece 6.1%, England 1.8% and New Zealand 1.4%. 53.1% of people spoke only English at home. Other languages spoken at home included Greek 12.4%, Mandarin 7.9%, Hindi 2.2%, Cantonese 1.8% and Italian 1.7%.

The most common responses for religion were No Religion 31.0%, Catholic 20.2% and Eastern Orthodox 14.4%. .

Hughesdale is primarily a residential suburb. The majority of the housing stock is detached. All original housing was either detached or semi-detached. Since the 1960s there has been some development of walk-up two-storey flats and flats in specific areas. More recently apartments in taller buildings around the railway station have increased in popularity.

== Transport ==
The main spine in Hughesdale is Poath Road (which had a level crossing until July 2018 that tended to divide the suburb) while other main roads include Railway Parade and Neerim Road (connecting Hughesdale with Murrumbeena), North Road and Dandenong Road which is the main route to the Melbourne CBD.

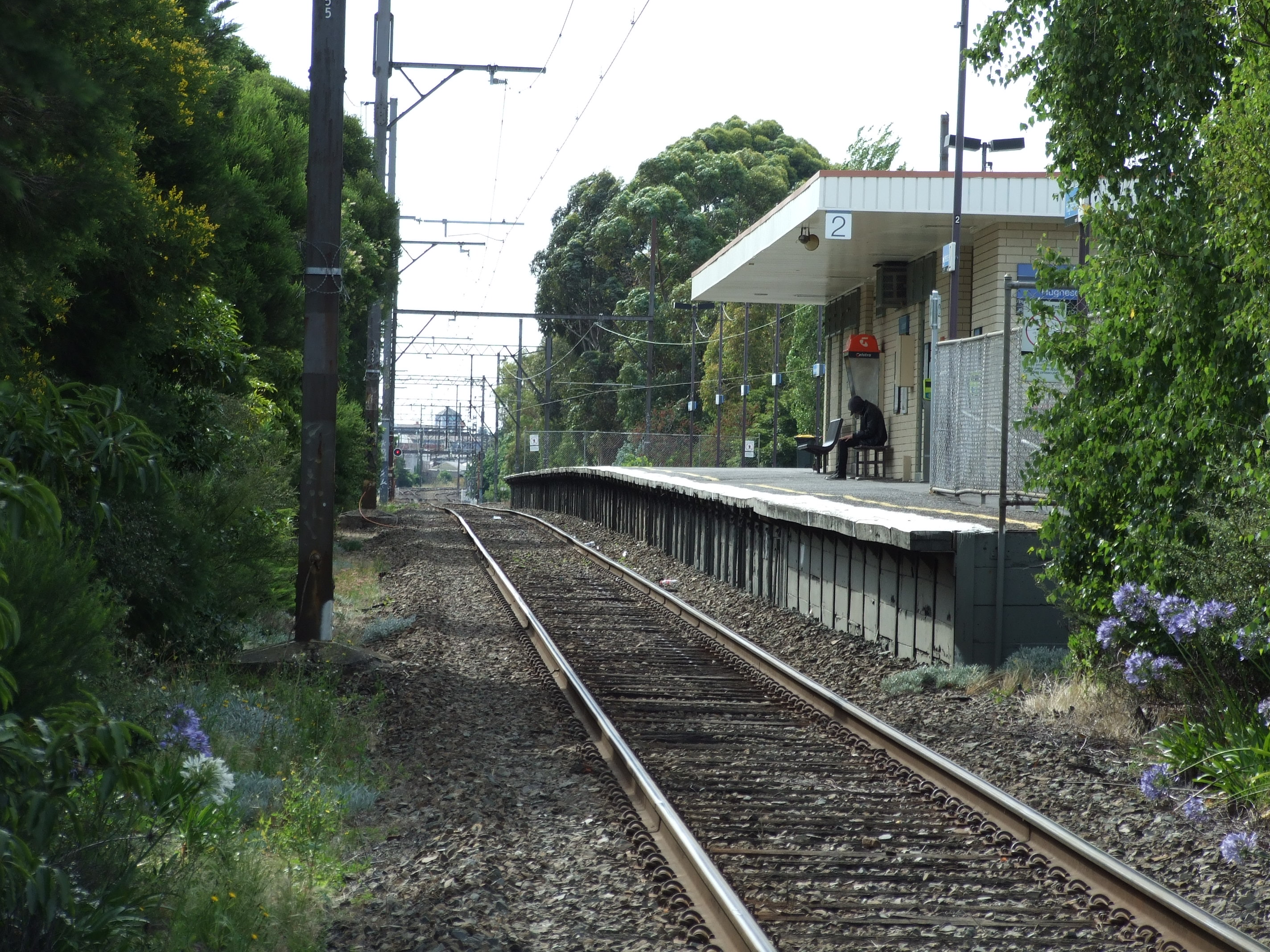
Former Hughesdale Railway Station

Hughesdale's railway station provides a very popular form of commuter transport. Census figures show that the suburb is ranked 12th out of Melbourne's 328 suburbs in the proportion of employed workers who travel to work by train: one in six use the train to get to work, double the Melbourne average. The railway station is within walking distance to most of the suburb.

- 624 Kew – Oakleigh via Auburn RS, Caulfield RS, Chadstone SC, Holmesglen RS (every day). Operated by CDC Melbourne.
- 625 Elsternwick – Chadstone SC via Ormond RS, Oakleigh RS (every day). Operated by CDC Melbourne.
- 767 Box Hill – Southland SC via Deakin University, Chadstone SC (every day). Operated by Ventura Bus Lines.
- 701 Bentleigh – Oakleigh via Mackie Road, Brady Road (every day). Operated by Ventura Bus Lines.

The bus routes the main spine of Hughesdale connecting with the railway station to provide inter-modal transport as well as connecting Hughesdale to Chadstone and Westfield Southland shopping centres.

Bicycle transport is also facilitated in Hughesdale with both on-road and segregated bicycle facilities in the form of paths which runs along the railway line between Murrumbeena and Oakleigh and through some of the suburb's parks.

== Education ==
Hughesdale has three schools – Hughesdale Primary School, Sacred Heart Girls' College and St Anargiri Greek Orthodox College.

Hughesdale Primary School, No. 4176, opened in 1924 as Oakleigh South State School and was renamed Hughesdale Primary School in 1938. It had a peak enrolment of 1296 in 1953, at which point some classes held 100 students. The school was threatened with closure by the Kennett government in the 1990s as student numbers fell because of demographic changes, but was saved after a vote at an extraordinary School Council meeting in October 1996. Enrolments have risen steadily since then; in 2005 there were 322 students enrolled.

Oakleigh Grammar (previously St Anargiri Greek Orthodox College) opened in 1983, primarily to satisfy the educational needs of the Greek community of Melbourne's southeastern suburbs. It was initially a Primary to Year 8 school, with 91 students; today it is registered for Primary to Year 12, with enrolments exceeding 740.

Sacred Heart Girls' College was opened in 1957 by the Sisters of Our Lady of the Missions, who came from the convent in Highgate, Perth, Western Australia. Enrolments for Year 7 are taken from surrounding Catholic Primary Schools. Subject to availability, places are then offered to other students, with preference given to Catholics.

The suburb was also the home of Oakleigh Technical School, at the corner of Poath Road and North Road, from 1946 to 1991. The school was demolished in 1993, with the site now occupied by a service station, McDonald's restaurant, a housing estate and a sports ground.

== See also ==
- City of Oakleigh – Hughesdale was previously within this former local government area.
- Hughesdale railway station
