= Noble Park North, Victoria =

Noble Park North
- Suburb
- Shopping strip, Elonera Road, Noble Park North

- Interactive map of Noble Park North
- Coordinates: 37.942°S 145.19°E
- Country: Australia
- State: Victoria
- City: Melbourne
- LGA: City of Greater Dandenong
- Location: 25 km (16 mi) from Melbourne; 5 km (3.1 mi) from Dandenong

Government
  - State electorates: Dandenong; Mulgrave
  - Federal divisions: Hotham; Bruce

Population
  - Total: 7,436 (2021 census)
- Postcode: 3174
Suburbs around Noble Park North
	Mulgrave
Springvale	Noble Park North	Dandenong North
	Noble Park

Noble Park North is a suburb in Melbourne, Victoria, Australia, 25 km south-east of Melbourne's Central Business District, located within the City of Greater Dandenong local government area. Noble Park North recorded a population of 7,436 at the 2021 census.

Noble Park North is bounded in the west by the edge of the Springvale Crematorium, in the north by Police Road, in the east by Bakers Road, Halton Road and Eastlink, and in the southwest by the Princes Highway.

== Education ==
Carwatha College P-12 is a state co-educational school in the suburb.

Silverton Primary is the local government school.

Nazareth College is a Catholic secondary school.

== Sport ==
The suburb has an Australian Rules football team, Lyndale Football Club and Silverton Football Club, competing in the Southern Football League.

The Silverton Bakers is the local cricket club which has both a junior and senior program.

Empowered Martial Arts trains at Silverton Primary school.

== See also ==
- City of Dandenong – Parts of Noble Park North were previously within this former local government area.
- City of Springvale – Parts of Noble Park North were previously within this former local government area.
