= Oakleigh Recreation Centre =

Aquatic and leisure facility in Oakleigh, Victoria

- Interactive map of Oakleigh Recreation Centre
- Location: Park Rd, Oakleigh, 3166
- Coordinates: 37.8927°S 145.0967°E
- Owner: The People
- Operator: City of Monash
- Facilities: Stadium, health club, crèche, massage services, cafe, pool

Construction
- Opened: Originally 1950s, redevelopment complete 2009
- Cost: AU$10 million to renovate

Website
- Oakleigh Recreation Centre

The Oakleigh Recreation Centre is an aquatic and leisure facility in Oakleigh, Victoria, Australia. The centre has a stadium with four multipurpose courts, a health club, a crossfit box, massage services, a cafe and a state-of-the-art outdoor pool. The pool area contains five pools, an outdoor 50m lap pool, a dive pool with seven diving boards, a multi-purpose pool and a toddler pool and splash pad, which is an aquatic playground.

== History ==
The original pools at Oakleigh Recreation Centre were constructed in the 1950s around a landscape of lawns and trees. Since then, the pool had grown to include a four-court indoor sports stadium, café and crèche. In 2007, the City of Monash assumed direct responsibility for the centre, including staff, programs and services.

The pool was starting to look outdated so, in December 2008, the council embarked on an AU$10m redevelopment to fix the aquatic areas of the pool. This project delivered seasonal aquatic facilities back to the community and worked with the existing programs and services. The council decided to retain one of Melbourne's last outdoor diving boards. It has also introduced DE filtration, one of only a select group of pools in Victoria to do so. This method of filtration, along with the salt water pool makes for crystal clear water.
