= Oakleigh, Victoria =

Oakleigh
- Suburb
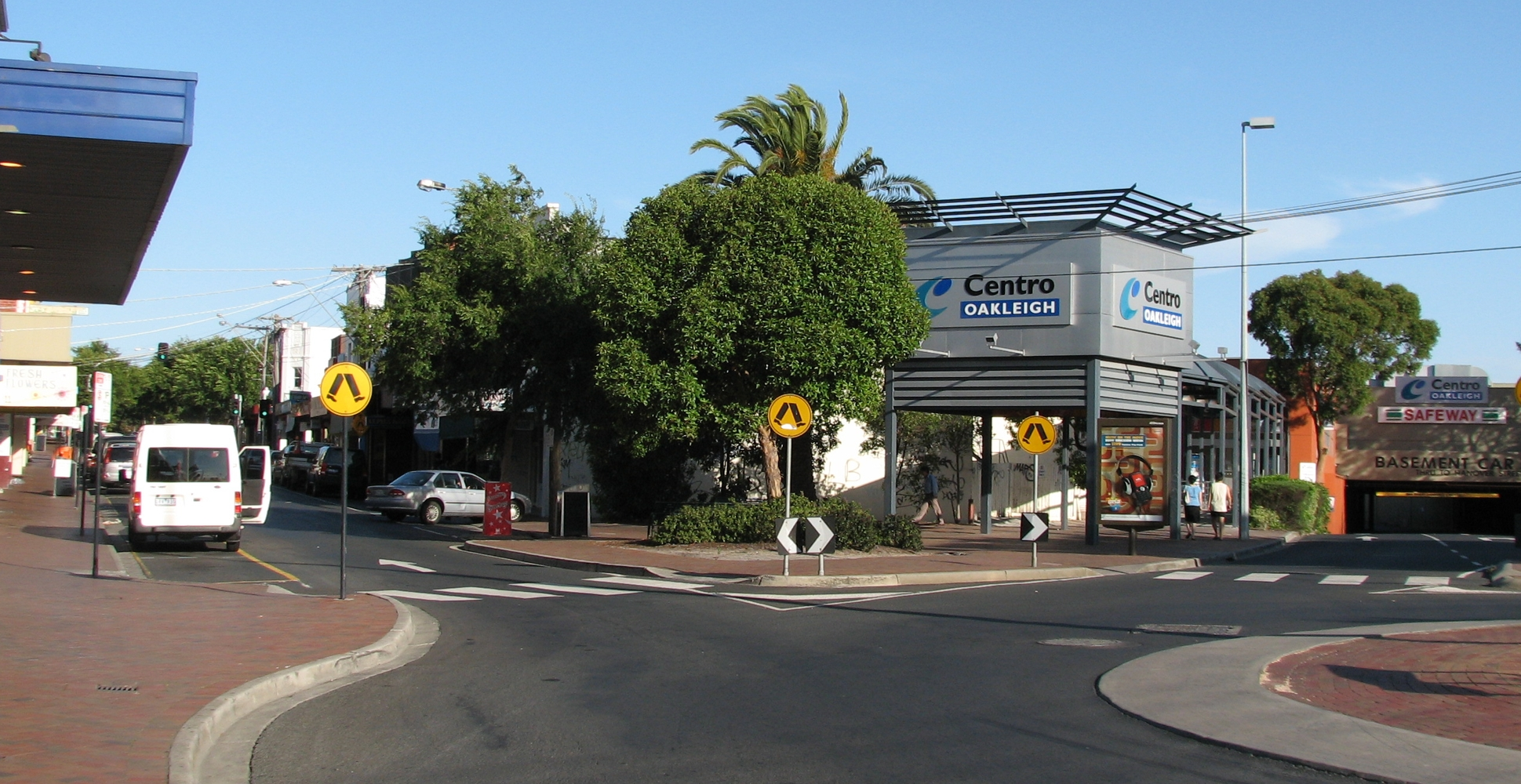
- Looking toward Centro Oakleigh Shopping Centre and Railway Station

- Interactive map of Oakleigh
- Coordinates: 37.913°S 145.102°E
- Country: Australia
- State: Victoria
- City: Melbourne
- LGA: City of Monash
- Location: 14 km (8.7 mi) from Melbourne

Government
  - State electorate: Oakleigh
  - Federal division: Hotham

Area
  - Total: 3.5 km^{2} (1.4 sq mi)
- Elevation: 65 m (213 ft)

Population
  - Total: 8,442 (SAL 2021)
- Postcode: 3166
Suburbs around Oakleigh
Malvern East	Chadstone	Mount Waverley
Hughesdale	Oakleigh	Oakleigh East
Bentleigh East	Oakleigh South	Huntingdale

Oakleigh is a suburb in Melbourne, Victoria, Australia 14 km south-east of Melbourne's Central Business District, located within the City of Monash local government area on the traditional lands of the Woiwurrung and Boonwurrung Peoples. Oakleigh recorded a population of 8,442 at the 2021 census.

Once a large independent city, Oakleigh was absorbed into Melbourne as part of the eastward expansion of the metropolis in the 1950s. As a result, it once had its own large historic Central Business District, its municipality in the former City of Oakleigh and its suburbs.

The area is traditionally known to have a strong Greek cultural influence, largely due to the influx of immigrants to Australia in the mid-20th century. Thirteen per cent of those living in the suburb speak only Greek at home.

Although the origin of the name of the suburb, "Oakleigh," is unclear, local historians have three main theories – that it was derived from she-oaks that grew near Scotchmans Creek; from "Oakleigh Park" an estate near Malvern Hills in England; or from Mrs Oakley, an early settler.

== History ==
The Oakleigh area was originally owned and inhabited by the Woiwurrung and Boonwurrung Peoples of the Kulin Nation. Boonwurrung belief holds that their land was created by the creator deity Bundjil. Following major dispossession of these Peoples by European colonists, a grazing run was established in the settled district east of Melbourne in the early 1840s, for which the lease was taken up by farmers John and Archibald McMillan. Scotchman's Creek Run, as it became known, was named after the Scottish settlers in the area in and near the run (including the McMillan, Campbell, and McPherson families). By 1853, Scotchman's Creek was known as South Yarra Creek, due to the well known South Yarra Pound (built in the area in the early 1840s on behalf of the government to collect stray livestock) and the associated South Yarra Inn. Part of the Parish of Mulgrave, County of Bourke, Oakleigh was first surveyed in 1853, and the first blocks of land were sold soon after. Oakleigh Post Office opened on 1 August 1854.

The Shire of Oakleigh was created in 1871 and a boom in settlement followed the opening of the Melbourne-Oakleigh railway line in 1877.

Oakleigh, along with Dandenong, soon became one of the closest large cities to Melbourne, and the key to its development was the railway line to Melbourne. Railway workshops, brick works (until 1953, the area supplied 20% of Melbourne's bricks), sand mining, and market gardens became the most important industries in Oakleigh at the end of the 19th century. The suburb contributed greatly to Melbourne's rapid growth, and as a result, Oakleigh has a legacy of many large old buildings and institutions, mostly located between the railway line and the main road at Dandenong Road (which once serviced the city).

The Oakleigh Hall (formerly the Mechanics' Institute) which once served as the town hall (1906), post office (1924) and courthouse (1934) still remains, as does a grandstand of the cricket and football oval. The Sacred Heart Church, a large Edwardian church with its twin copper dome, is still a landmark of the area and is now part of a school.

Oakleigh's urban potential was increased by the addition of part of Caulfield, comprising present day Hughesdale, in 1913. In 1924 Oakleigh was proclaimed a town and on 2 August 1927, a city. By then the Oakleigh area was substantially built up, and housing was extending to Hughesdale and Huntingdale (East Oakleigh) in the vicinity of their railway station. At the close of the war these areas were described as rising suburbs. Because the land in Oakleigh South was sandy and fairly flat – suitable for golf courses – Oakleigh South was the home of Sand Belt private golf courses such as the Metropolitan, Commonwealth, and Huntingdale Golf Clubs.

The Convent of the Good Shepherd occupied the northernmost boundary of the city until it was demolished in 1984 to make way for the extensions of Chadstone Shopping Centre. Chadstone Shopping Centre opened in 1960 and was constructed on land that was initially leased from the Good Shepherd Sisters for 99 years. In 1983 the whole site was purchased from the congregation. Chadstone Shopping Centre is now part of Malvern East. Chadstone Shopping Centre was built about 1.5 kilometres from the Oakleigh shopping centre. Although trading in the three or four active street in the Oakleigh shopping centre was maintained with one-way traffic and pedestrianisation, the contrast with climate-controlled Chadstone was apparent.

The Oakleigh General Cemetery was in operation from 1860 until 1960. It is situated in Oakleigh Pioneer Memorial Park.

The Oakleigh library, now a branch of Monash Public Library, was moved to its current location on Drummond Street in 1967 and a new foyer integrated it with the old Mechanics Institute Hall and Senior Citizens rooms.

Oakleigh Primary School No. 1601 was established in 1875. The lower-school is situated in a renovated building (first opened in 1914). The middle and upper school are situated in the modern building (opened in 1977). The school opened a purpose-built kindergarten in 2005 for 3- and 4-year-old children. In 2011, a Performing Arts Centre was added, it being built out of concrete and having an iron roof, and in 2017, portable classrooms were placed on the tennis courts to cater to the ever-expanding school. Since 2011, Jack Fisher was the principal of the school, but he resigned in 2017.

The Oakleigh Motel, the first of its kind, and an example of Googie architecture, was opened in time for the 1956 Summer Olympics. The building was on the Monash Council heritage register, but despite this the council granted permission to demolish it. Heritage Victoria has since granted provisional heritage status to the building. The motel ushered in an era when the motor car dominated the city as Melbourne sprawled and expanded to absorb Oakleigh and also Dandenong into its ever-expanding south-eastern conurbation.

Oakleigh was defined as a Major Activity Centre as part of the Melbourne 2030 planning policy.

== Demographics and housing ==
The area is traditionally known to have a strong Greek cultural influence, largely due to the influx of said immigrants to Australia in the mid-20th century. Fourteen percent of those living in the suburb speak Greek at home. Evidence of Greek cultural influence can be found in the Oakleigh Cannons football club, which was established in 1972 by Greek immigrants. Further evidence of Greek cultural influence can be found in the Greek Orthodox church of Agioi Anargyroi.

== Central Business District ==
Oakleigh has a large historic Central Business District spanning some nine city blocks. Atherton Road is Oakleigh's historic commercial main street while Drummond Street is its former civic spine. This area contains many older commercial buildings including banks and retail complexes dating back to the early days of the city. There are a small number of multi-storey office buildings which date back to the city's growth period.

Eaton Street is a pedestrian mall which connects Atherton Road with the Centro Shopping Centre and railway station. The CBD is a popular activity centre with locals with a great many cafes, several hotels, restaurants and retail shops. The thriving shopping district has an abundance of butchers, bakeries, beauty salons, and specialty shops selling sweets. There are also multiple laneways with Greek-themed cafés that specialise in café frappé. A police station, primary school, public Library, RSL, Community Hall and historical centre (Monash Federation Centre) Cemetery and football ground and park are in the nearby historical precinct of Drummond Street.

A smaller commercial area developed along Dandenong Road. Both centres continue to develop.

== Transport ==
The main form of transport in Oakleigh is the private vehicle. Major roads in the suburb include Dandenong Road (Princes Highway), Ferntree Gully Road and Warrigal Road.

Oakleigh railway station provides suburban railway services on both the Cranbourne and Pakenham lines.

Oakleigh is also the hub of a large component of Melbourne's eastern bus network. Many of the buses interchange at a terminus alongside the railway station and follow routes which run through the suburb.

Bicycle transport is facilitated by a network of on-road and also segregated bicycle facilities.

== Sport ==
An association football club, the Oakleigh Cannons FC, competes in the Australian second-tier competition, the National Premier League.

The suburb has two Australian rules football clubs, namely the Oakleigh Chargers TAC Cup team and the Oakleigh Amateur Football Club.

The former Oakleigh Football Club was the city's most popular sporting team, and competed in the Victorian Football Association from 1929 until its dissolution in 1994.

Golfers play at the Oakleigh Golf Club on Park Road.

The Oakleigh Recreation Centre is the suburbs primary indoor sporting facility, offering the council's 176,000 residents and those of nearby municipalities' state of the art recreational facilities and an array of pools to improve community health and activity.

== Gallery ==
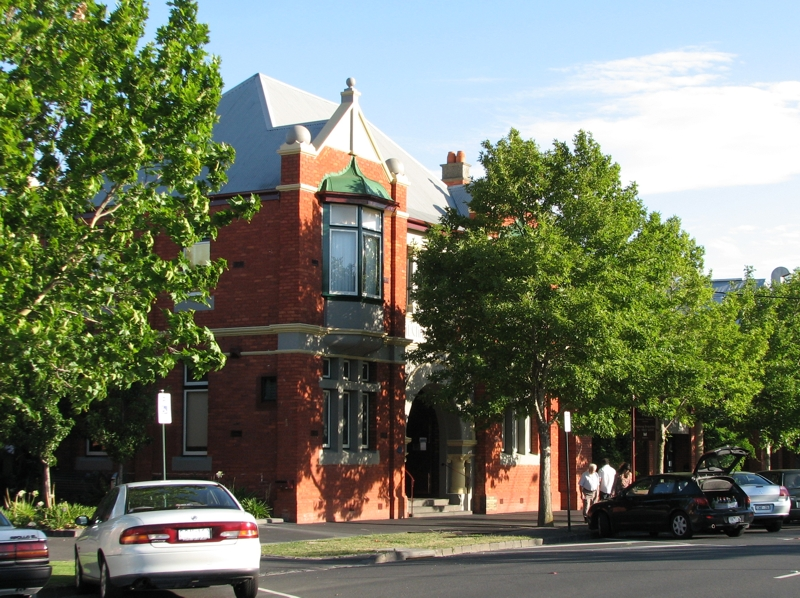
Oakleigh Hall, Oakleigh's historic former town hall, post office and courthouse

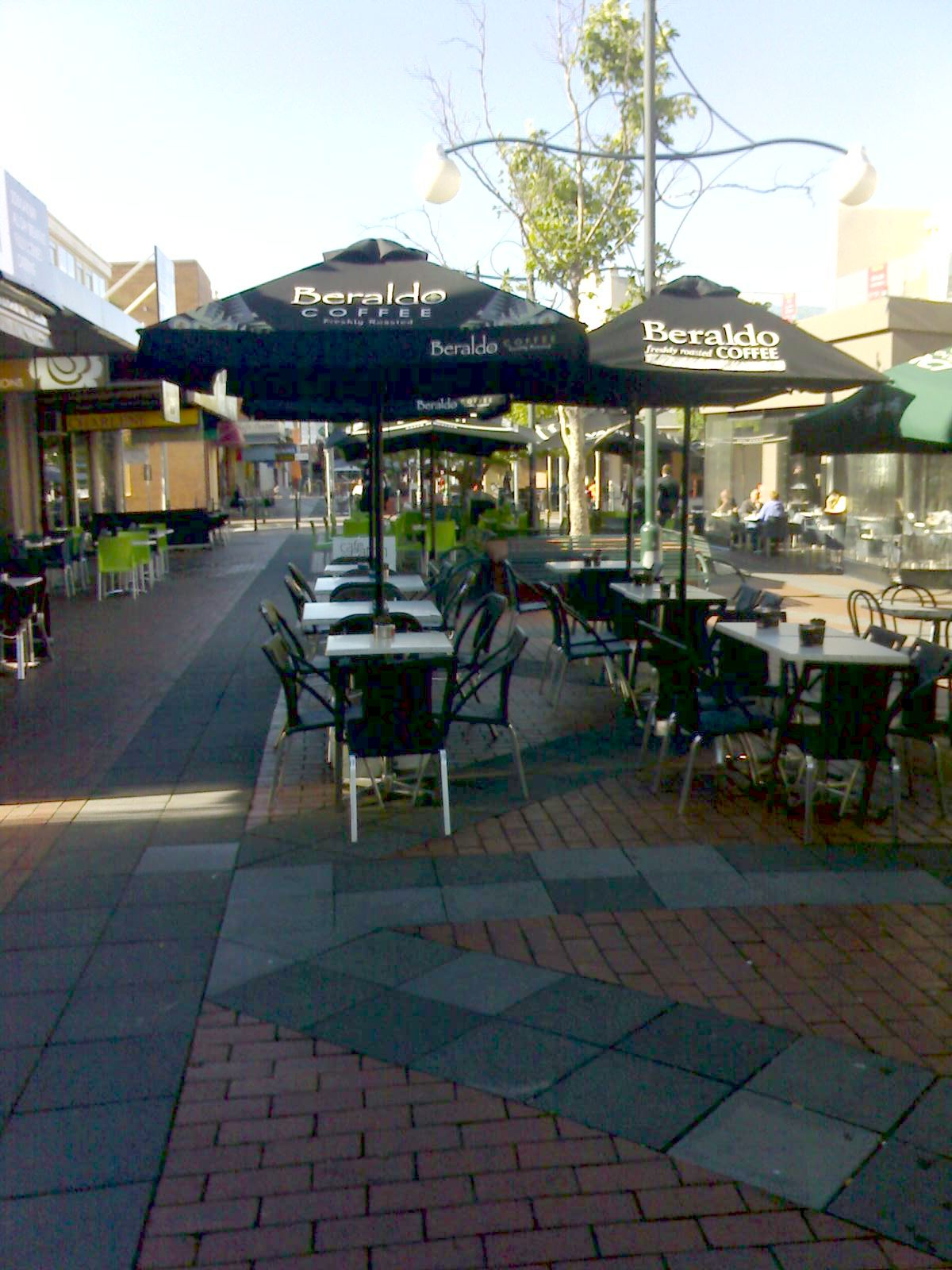
Cafes in Oakleigh

Cafes and outdoor dining in Eaton Mall, Oakleigh.

One of the shopping laneways in Oakleigh, with traditional Greek cobblestone.

== See also ==
- City of Oakleigh – Oakleigh was previously within this former local government area.
- Oakleigh railway station
- Electoral district of Oakleigh
