= South Oakleigh Secondary College =

School in Melbourne, Australia

South Oakleigh College
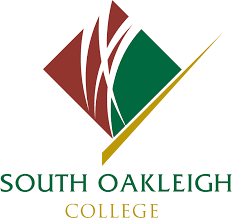

Location
- Bakers Road, Oakleigh South; Melbourne, Victoria, 3167; Australia
- 37°55′21″S 145°5′27″E

Information
- Type: Co-educational government school
- Motto: Knowledge Conquers All
- Principal: Helen Koziaris
- Website: www.sosc.vic.edu.au

South Oakleigh College is a Victorian state co-educational secondary college within the City of Monash in south eastern Melbourne, Australia. It is located on Bakers Road, near the intersection of Centre and Warrigal Roads, in Oakleigh South.

== Principle ==
The current principle of South Oakleigh College is Helen Koziaris (as of 2020). She works alongside 4 vice principles: Mark Picone, Anthony Katsianos, George Tzimourtas and Louise O'Neill.

== History ==
South Oakleigh College was established and developed in the 2000s.

Former principal, Deborah Locco, was killed in a cycling accident in May 2020.

== Facilities ==
Among the schools's facilities are a library, science buildings, food technology facilities, a 350-seat performing arts theatre, a television studio, a gymnasium and a fitness centre.

== Curriculum ==
=== Subjects ===
South Oakleigh Secondary College offers core strengthening subjects from Years 7–9, with elective choices being offered in Years 8 onwards. From Year 10, students are given the opportunity to study VCE subjects ahead of time, alongside their core subjects (English, Maths, Science and Humanities). In Year 11, students are also given the opportunity to complete Units 3 and 4 subjects, thus reducing the number of subjects they must study in Year 12. The subjects offered are:

| Accounting | Biology | Business Management |
| Chemistry | Classical Greek | English |
| English – Additional language | Food Studies | Health and Human Development |
| History | Information Technology | IT Software Development |
| Japanese | Legal Studies | Literature |
| Maths: Further Maths | Maths: Maths Methods | Maths: Specialist Maths |
| Media Technology | Modern Greek | Physical Education |
| Physics | Politics | Music |
| Psychology | Studio Art | Systems Engineering |
| Theatre Studies | Visual Communication & Design | |

==== Languages ====
Year 7 students are required to learn a foreign language; the college offers Japanese and Greek. Students are allowed to either drop this language when going into Year 9, or continue it in an accelerated program.

==== VET subjects offered ====
- Interactive Digital Media (VCE VET)
- Music: Technical Production (VCE VET)
