= City of Mordialloc =

Coordinates: 37°59′S 145°04′E

City of Mordialloc Victoria
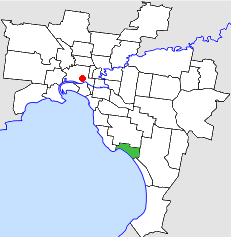
- Location in Melbourne
- The extent of the City of Mordialloc at its dissolution in 1994
- Population: 27,900 (1992)
  - Density: 2,056/km^{2} (5,325/sq mi)
- Established: 1920
- Area: 13.57 km^{2} (5.2 sq mi)
- Council seat: Mentone
- Region: Southeastern Melbourne
- County: Mornington
LGAs around City of Mordialloc:
Moorabbin	Moorabbin	Springvale
Sandringham	City of Mordialloc	Springvale
Port Phillip	Port Phillip	Chelsea

The City of Mordialloc was a local government area about 20 kilometres (12 mi) south of Melbourne, the state capital of Victoria, Australia, on the eastern side of Port Phillip. The city covered an area of 13.57 square kilometres (5.24 sq mi), and existed from 1920 until 1994.

== History ==
Mordialloc was originally part of the Shire of Moorabbin, and was severed and incorporated as the Borough of Mentone and Mordialloc on 26 May 1920. It increased in size on 18 May 1921, by absorbing another small section of Moorabbin. It was declared a town on 17 April 1923, and its name changed to Mordialloc a week later. It was proclaimed a city on 5 May 1926.

On 15 December 1994, the City of Mordialloc was abolished, and along with the City of Chelsea and parts of the Cities of Moorabbin, Oakleigh and Springvale, was merged into the newly created City of Kingston. The eastern section of Beaumaris was transferred to the newly created City of Bayside.

Council meetings were held at the Mentone Town Hall, on Mentone Parade, Mentone. It presently serves as a council service centre and library for the City of Kingston.

== Wards ==
The City of Mordialloc was subdivided into three wards, each electing three councillors:

- Mentone Ward
- Parkdale Ward
- Mordialloc Ward

== Suburbs ==
- Beaumaris (shared with the Cities of Moorabbin and Sandringham)
- Mentone* (shared with the City of Moorabbin)
- Mordialloc
- Parkdale

* Council seat.

== Population ==
Year	Population
1933	9,216
1954	21,025
1958	24,500*
1961	26,526
1966	28,058
1971	29,753
1976	28,615
1981	27,869
1986	26,817
1991	26,325

* Estimate in the 1958 Victorian Year Book.
