= Carwatha College =

Carwatha College P–12

Location
- 43–81 Browns Road; Noble Park North, Victoria; Australia; 37°56′33″S 145°11′24″E

Information
- Type: Public
- Established: 1998
- Principal: Patrick Mulcahy
- Years: P–12
- Newspaper: Whispering Pines (Fortnightly Newsletter)
- Website: www.carwatha.vic.edu.au

Carwatha College P–12 is a state co-educational school located in Noble Park North, Victoria, Australia. Alumni include Glenn Archer and Academy Award winner Adam Elliot.
