= City of Springvale =

Coordinates: 37°56′49″S 145°09′11″E

City of Springvale Victoria
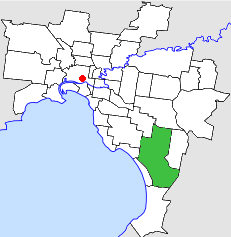
- Location in Melbourne
- The extent of the City of Springvale at its dissolution in 1994
- Population: 93,900 (1992)
  - Density: 962.1/km^{2} (2,491.8/sq mi)
- Established: 1857
- Area: 97.60 km^{2} (37.7 sq mi)
- Council seat: Springvale
- Region: Southeastern Melbourne
- County: Bourke, Mornington
LGAs around City of Springvale:
Oakleigh	Waverley	Waverley
Moorabbin; Mordialloc	City of Springvale	Dandenong
Chelsea	Frankston	Cranbourne

The City of Springvale was a local government area about 30 kilometres (19 mi) southeast of Melbourne, the state capital of Victoria, Australia. The city covered an area of 97.60 square kilometres (37.68 sq mi), and existed from 1857 until 1994.

== History ==
Springvale was first incorporated as part of the Dandenong Road District on 6 February 1857. It then became part of the Shire of Dandenong on 16 May 1873. In May 1920, its coastal section split away to form the Borough of Carrum. The Shire of Dandenong was subdivided into two separate municipalities, namely the Shire of Dandenong and the Shire of Springvale and Noble Park, which came into effect on 31 May 1955. In May 1959, it lost 6.5 square kilometres (2.5 sq mi) of land to the City of Oakleigh. The City of Springvale was proclaimed on 22 April 1961.

On 15 December 1994, the City of Springvale amalgamated with the then City of Dandenong to become known as the City of Greater Dandenong. The suburbs of Dingley Village, Braeside, Aspendale Gardens, Chelsea Heights and Patterson Lakes were transferred to the newly created City of Kingston.

Council meetings were held at the City Hall, at Springvale Road and Grace Park Avenue, Springvale. It presently serves as city offices for the City of Greater Dandenong.

== Wards ==
The City of Springvale was subdivided into four wards in April 1987, each electing three councillors:

- North Ward
- Central Ward
- South Ward
- West Ward

== Suburbs ==
- Aspendale Gardens (now part of the City of Kingston)
- Bangholme (now part of the City of Greater Dandenong)
- Braeside (now part of the City of Kingston)
- Carrum Downs (part only), (now part of the City of Frankston)
- Chelsea Heights (now part of the City of Kingston)
- Dingley Village (now part of the City of Kingston)
- Keysborough (now part of the City of Greater Dandenong)
- Noble Park (now part of the City of Greater Dandenong)
- Noble Park North (now part of the City of Greater Dandenong)
- Patterson Lakes (now part of the City of Kingston)
- Springvale* (now part of the City of Greater Dandenong)
- Springvale South (now part of the City of Greater Dandenong)

* Council seat.

== Population ==
Year	Population
1958	22,800*
1961	28,542
1966	39,412
1971	58,374
1976	72,474
1981	77,817
1986	83,385
1991	89,478

* Estimate in the 1958 Victorian Year Book.
