= City of Dandenong =

Coordinates: 37°59′10″S 145°12′47″E

City of Dandenong Victoria
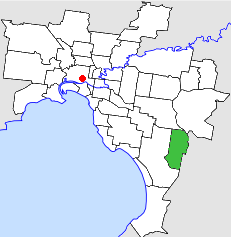
- Location in Melbourne
- The extent of the City of Dandenong at its dissolution in 1994
- Population: 59,000 (1992)
  - Density: 1,627/km^{2} (4,210/sq mi)
- Established: 1955
- Area: 36.26 km^{2} (14.0 sq mi)
- Council seat: Dandenong
- Region: Southeast Melbourne
- County: Mornington
LGAs around City of Dandenong:
Waverley	Knox	Knox
Springvale	City of Dandenong	Berwick
Springvale	Springvale	Cranbourne

The City of Dandenong was a local government area about 35 kilometres (22 mi) southeast of Melbourne, the state capital of Victoria, Australia. The city covered an area of 36.26 square kilometres (14.00 sq mi), and existed from 1857 until 1994.

== History ==
Dandenong was part of the Shire of Dandenong, which was first incorporated in 1857 as a road district, and became a shire in 1873. On 31 May 1955, the new Shire of Dandenong was separately incorporated, while the original Shire of Dandenong was renamed Springvale and Noble Park. On 14 May 1959, Dandenong was proclaimed a city.

On 15 December 1994, the City of Dandenong was abolished, and along with parts of the Cities of Berwick, Cranbourne and Springvale, was merged into the newly created City of Greater Dandenong.

Council meetings were held at the Town Hall, at the corner of Lonsdale Street and Walker Street, Dandenong, but most city business was conducted at the city offices in Clow Street, two blocks away. Both locations are still used by the City of Greater Dandenong for their original purpose.

== Wards ==
The City of Dandenong was subdivided into four wards, each electing three councillors:

- North West Ward
- North East Ward
- Centre Ward
- South West Ward

== Suburbs ==
- Dandenong*
- Dandenong North
- Dandenong South (shared with the City of Cranbourne)
- Keysborough (shared with the City of Springvale)
- Noble Park (shared with the City of Springvale)
- Noble Park North (shared with the City of Springvale)

* Council seat.

== Population ==
Year	Population
1955	27,748
1961	24,909
1966	31,659
1971	40,883
1976	48,444
1981	54,962
1986	56,461
1991	57,275

* Estimate in the 1958 Victorian Year Book.
