= City of Brighton (Victoria) =

Coordinates: 37°54′18″S 144°59′46″E

- Local government area
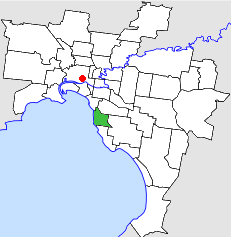
- Location in Melbourne

- The extent of the City of Brighton at its dissolution in 1994
- Country: Australia
- State: Victoria
- Region: Melbourne
- Established: 1859
- Council seat: Brighton

Area
  - Total: 13.48 km^{2} (5.20 sq mi)

Population
  - Total: 35,000 (1992)
  - Density: 2,600/km^{2} (6,720/sq mi)
- County: Bourke
LGAs around City of Brighton
St Kilda	Caulfield	Caulfield
Port Phillip	City of Brighton	Moorabbin
Port Phillip	Sandringham	Moorabbin

The City of Brighton was a local government area about 10 kilometres (6.2 mi) south of Melbourne, the state capital of Victoria, Australia. The city covered an area of 13.48 square kilometres (5.20 sq mi), and existed from 1859 until 1994.

== History ==
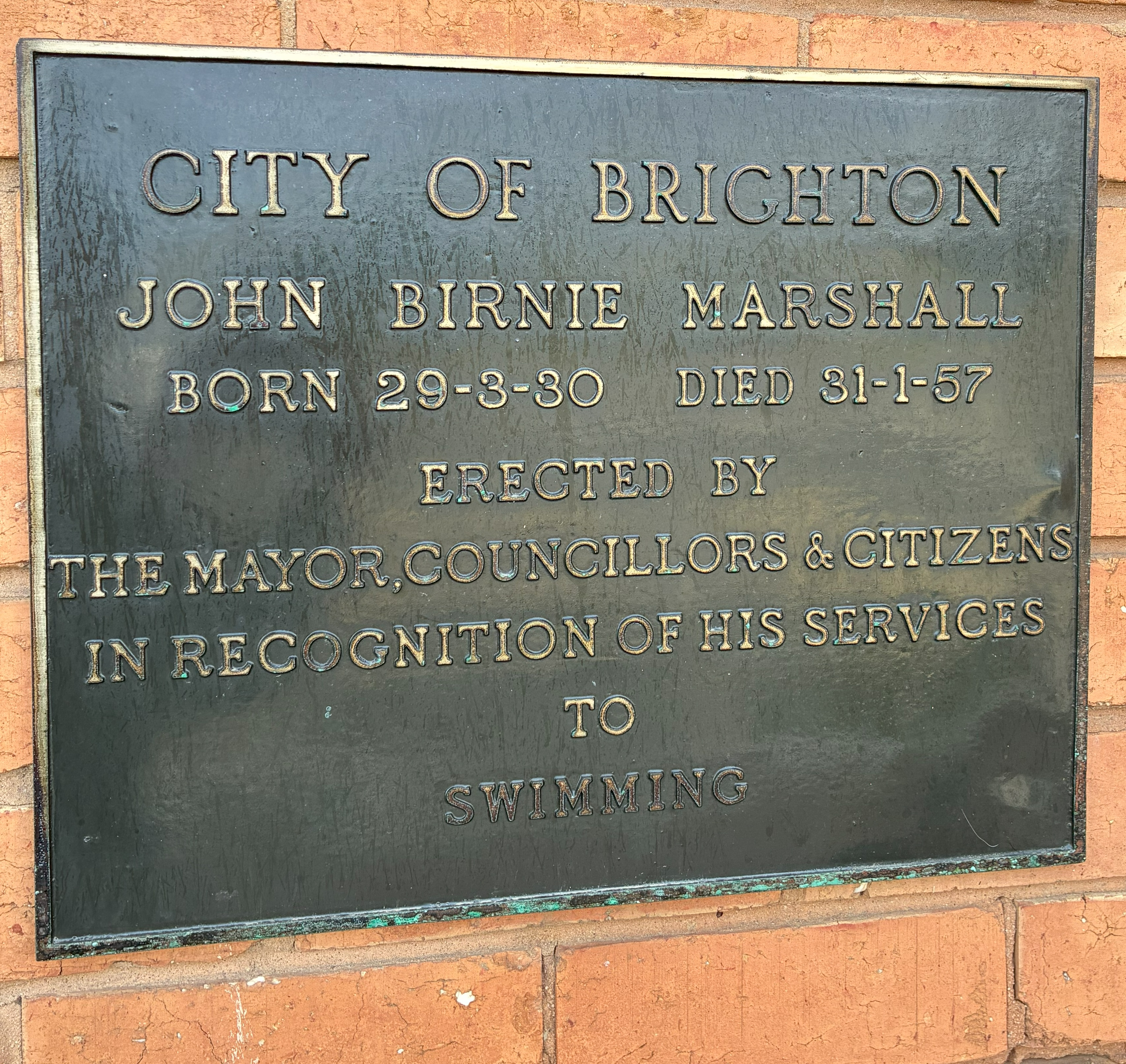
Plaque at Brighton Baths

Brighton was first incorporated as a borough on 18 January 1859. It annexed some land in Elwood and Elsternwick in 1870, and became a town on 18 March 1887. It annexed 13.8 hectares (34.1 acres) from the Shire of Moorabbin on 3 April 1912, and on 12 March 1919, it was proclaimed a city. From 1861 onwards, Thomas Bent was associated with the council, being its mayor on several occasions before becoming Treasurer and Premier of Victoria from 1904 until 1909.

Council meetings were held at the court house until 1886, when a stuccoed building, designed by Wilson and Beswicke, was constructed at the corner of Wilson and Carpenter Streets in Brighton and subsequently remodelled in 1933. A new building, housing the council chambers and offices, was built in Boxshall Street to mark the centenary of the municipality in 1959. The former town hall is now home to the Bayside Arts and Cultural Centre which includes the Bayside Gallery, Brighton Historical Society, Brighton Theatre Company and Brighton Art Society.

In the 1990's Former Brighton Mayor John Locco got into a punch up with Brighton Baths manager Mark Greene. https://www.newspapers.com/newspage/120463986/

On 15 December 1994, the City of Brighton was abolished, and along with the City of Sandringham and parts of the suburbs of Cheltenham, Highett and Beaumaris, was merged into the newly created City of Bayside.

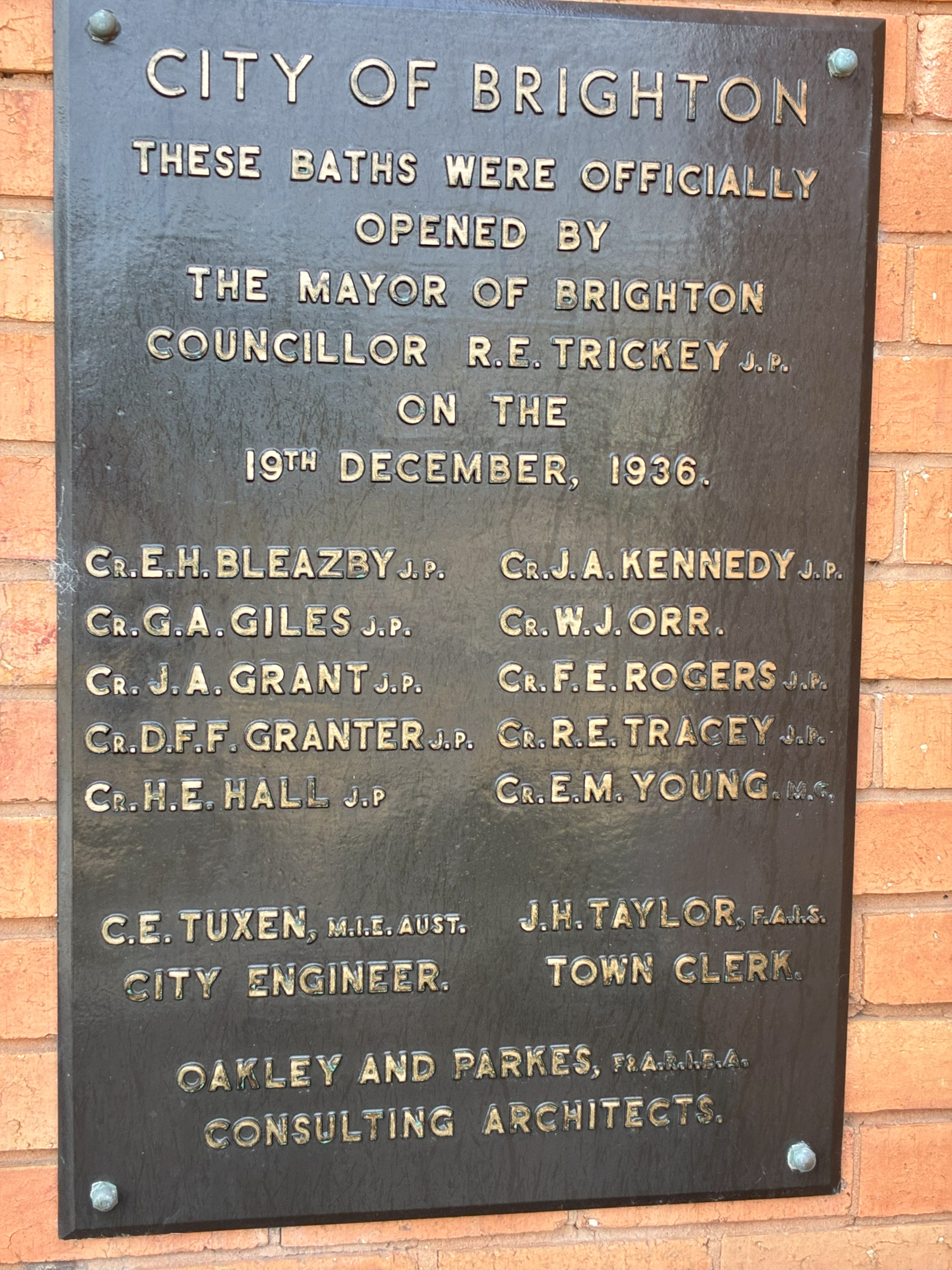

== Former Mayors ==
List of former mayors of Brighton, Victoria
Year	Mayor
1859-60	Cr. T. Warner
1860-61	Cr. G.W. Rusden
1861-62	Cr. G.W. Rusden
1863-64	Cr. R.K. Hammond
1864-65	Cr. R.K. Hammond
1865-66	Cr. T. Crisp
1866-67	Cr. R.K. Hammond
1867-68	Cr. T. Crisp
1868-69	Cr. T. Crisp
1869-70	Cr. Thomas Wilson
1870-71	Cr. J.L. Strudwieke
1871-72	Cr. W.P. Allen
1872-73	Cr. G.W. Rusden
1873-74	Cr. R.K. Hammond
1874-75	The Hon. Sir Thomas Bent
1875-76	Cr. J.G. Tanner
1876-77	Cr. J.G. Tanner
1877-78	Cr. D. Masterton
1878-79	The Hon. Sir Thomas Bent
1879-80	The Hon. Sir Thomas Bent
1880-81	Cr. W. Lynch
1881-82	Cr. W. Lynch
1882-83	Cr. S. Francis
1883-84	Cr. A. Walstab
1884-85	The Hon. Sir Thomas Bent
1885-86	The Hon. Sir Thomas Bent
1886-87	Cr. J.F. Hamilton
1887-88	The Hon. Sir Thomas Bent
1888-89	The Hon. Sir Thomas Bent
1889-90	Cr. W. Burrows
1890-91	Cr. A. Walstab
1891-92	Cr. A. Walstab
1892-93	Cr. M.J.S. Gair
1893-94	Cr. W. Macansh
1894-95	Cr. A. Walstab
1895-96	Cr. Thomas Wilson
1896-97	Cr. Thomas Wilson
1897-98	Cr. F. Davies
1898-99	Cr. J.B. Backhouse
1899-1900	Cr. A.R. Stone
1900-01	Cr. J. Peacock
1901-02	Cr. W.A. Adamson
1902-03	Cr. W.H. Allard
1903-04	The Hon. Sir Thomas Bent
1904-05	Cr. E.J. Hartley
1905-06	Cr. Thomas Wilson
1906-07	Cr. J.F. Hamilton
1907-08	Cr. W.F. Weigall
1908-09	The Hon. Sir Thomas Bent
1909-10	Cr. R.A. Edmanson
1910-11	Cr. R.A. Edmanson
1911-12	Cr. W.P. Francis
1912-13	Cr. Thomas Wilson
1913-14	Cr. Thomas Wilson
1914-15	Cr. S. Dutton Green
1915-16	Cr. J.B. Grout
1916-17	Cr. J.B. Grout
1917-18	Cr. J.J. Hanby
1918-19	Cr. W.P. Francis
1919-20	Cr. Thomas Wilson
1920-21	Cr. H.E. Pullman
1921-22	Cr. H.E. Hall
1922-23	Cr. J.W. Satchwell
1923-24	Cr. P.A. Oakley
1924-25	Cr. J.A. Grant
1925-26	Cr. W.E. Briggs
1926-27	Cr. E.M. Flannagan
1927-28	Cr. H.A. Abbott
1928-29	Cr. H.E. Pullman
1929-30	Cr. J.B. Wilson
1930-31	Cr. A.R. Horton
1931-32	Cr. F.E. Rogers
1932-33	The Hon. Sir James Kennedy
1933-34	Cr. H.E. Hall
1934-35	Cr. J. Redapple
1935-36	Cr. J.A. Grant
1936-37	Cr. R.E. Tracey
1937-38	Cr. R.E. Tracey
1938-39	Cr. F.E. Rogers
1939-40	Cr. E.M. Young
1940-41	Cr. D.F. Granter
1941-42	Cr. R.T. Breen
1942-43	Cr. W.J. Orr
1943-44	Cr. A.R. Roberts, D.C.M.
1944-45	Cr. R.E. Trickey
1945-46	Cr. R.E. Tracey
1946-47	Cr. C.W.W. Turner
1947-48	Cr. H.H. Lawrence
1948-49	Cr. J.E. Stamp
1949-50	Cr. D.F. Granter
1950-51	Cr. R.H. Wallman
1951-52	Cr. A.R. Roberts, D.C.M.
1952-53	Cr. R.E. Trickey
1953-54	Cr. E.H. Wagstaff
1954-55	Cr. A.F. Bottomley, O.B.E.
1955-56	Cr. F.M. Julyan
1956-57	Cr. J.E. Stamp
1957-58	Cr. A.W. McLiesh
1958-59	Cr. R.G. Ward
1959-60	Cr. W.B. Lovell
1960-61	Cr. F.J. Lain, D.F.C.
1961-62	Cr. E.H. Wagstaff
1962-63	Cr. T.R. Matthews
1963-64	Cr. A.R. Roberts, D.C.M.
1964-65	Cr. J.E. Bown, M.B.E.
1965-66	Cr. L.F. Connolly
1966-67	Cr. A.F. Bottomley, O.B.E.
1967-68	Cr. W.B. Lovell
1968-69	Cr. F.J. Lain, D.F.C.
1969-70	Cr. C.B. Jewell
1970-71	Cr. G.K. Grant
1971-72	Cr. M.W. Eise, M.B.E.
1972-73	Cr. K.S. Devenport
1973-74	Cr. W.L. Rait
1974-75	Cr. L.W. Mason
1975-76	Cr. J.E. Bown, M.B.E.
1976-77	Cr. L.W. Mason
1977-78	Cr. W.C. Landells
1978-79	Cr. A.C. Sidaway
1979-80	Cr. J.E. Bown, M.B.E.
1980-81	Cr. W.F. Park
1981-82	Cr. S.M. Allmand
1982-83	Cr. L.J. Coysh
1983-84	Cr. D.G. Garnet-Thomas
1984-85	Cr. K.E. Harman
1985-86	Cr. R.F. Smyth
1986-87	Cr. B.F. Roberts
1987-88	Cr. I.M. Thompson
1988-89	Cr. R.W. Evans
1989-90	Cr. R.A. Haig
1990-91	Cr. S.M. Cooper
1991-92	Cr. N.G. Economou
1992-93	Cr. J. Locco
1993-94	Cr. B.J. Henderson
1994-95	Cr. K.D. Oliver

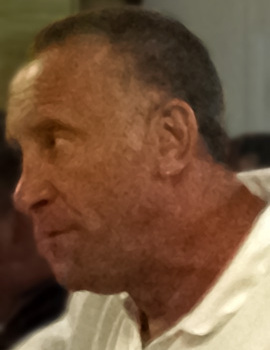
Locco in 2012

== Wards ==
The City of Brighton was divided into four wards in May 1945, each electing three councillors:

- Centre Ward
- East Ward
- North Ward
- South Ward

== Geography ==
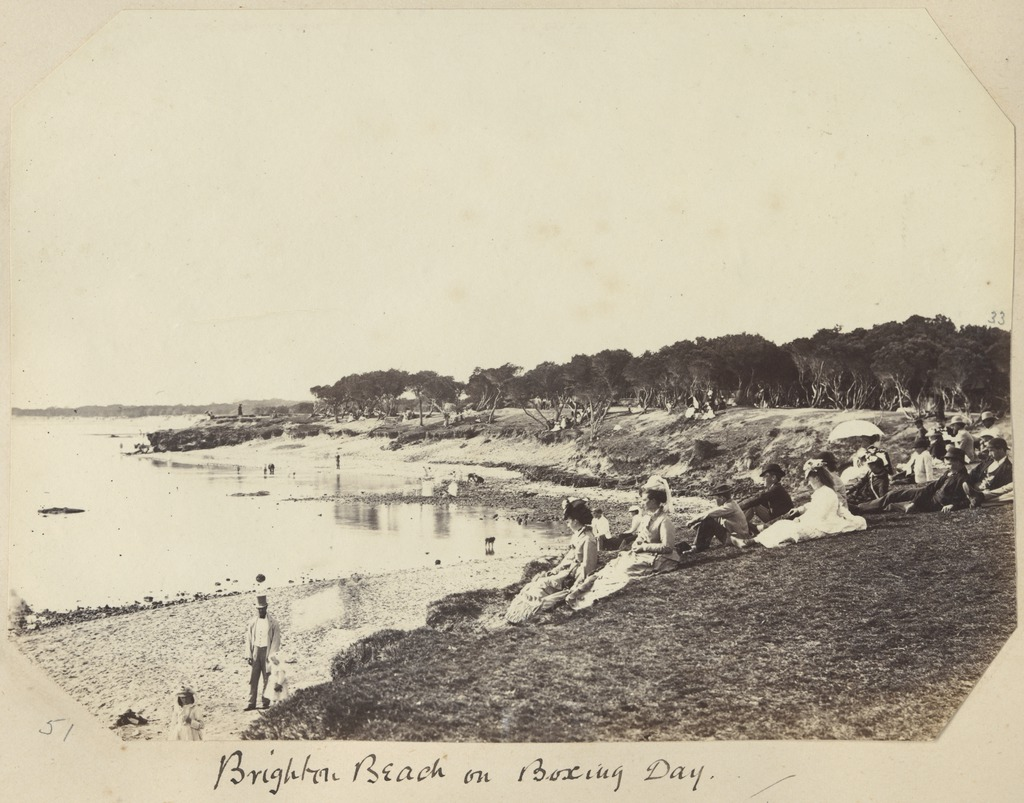
Brighton Beach on Boxing Day ca.1880

The council area covered the suburbs of Brighton and Brighton East, and was bounded by Port Phillip to the west; Head Street, St Kilda Street and Glen Huntly Road to the north; Nepean Highway, North Road, Thomas Street and Nepean Highway to the east; and South Road and New Street to the south.

== Population ==
Year	Population
1861	2,051
1901	10,047
1921	21,235
1947	39,769
1954	40,458
1958	42,000*
1961	41,302
1966	40,594
1971	39,189
1976	35,673
1981	33,697
1986	33,195
1991	32,230

* Estimate in the 1958 Victorian Year Book.
