= City of Caulfield =

Coordinates: 37°52′59″S 145°01′34″E

- Local government area
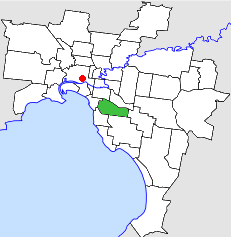
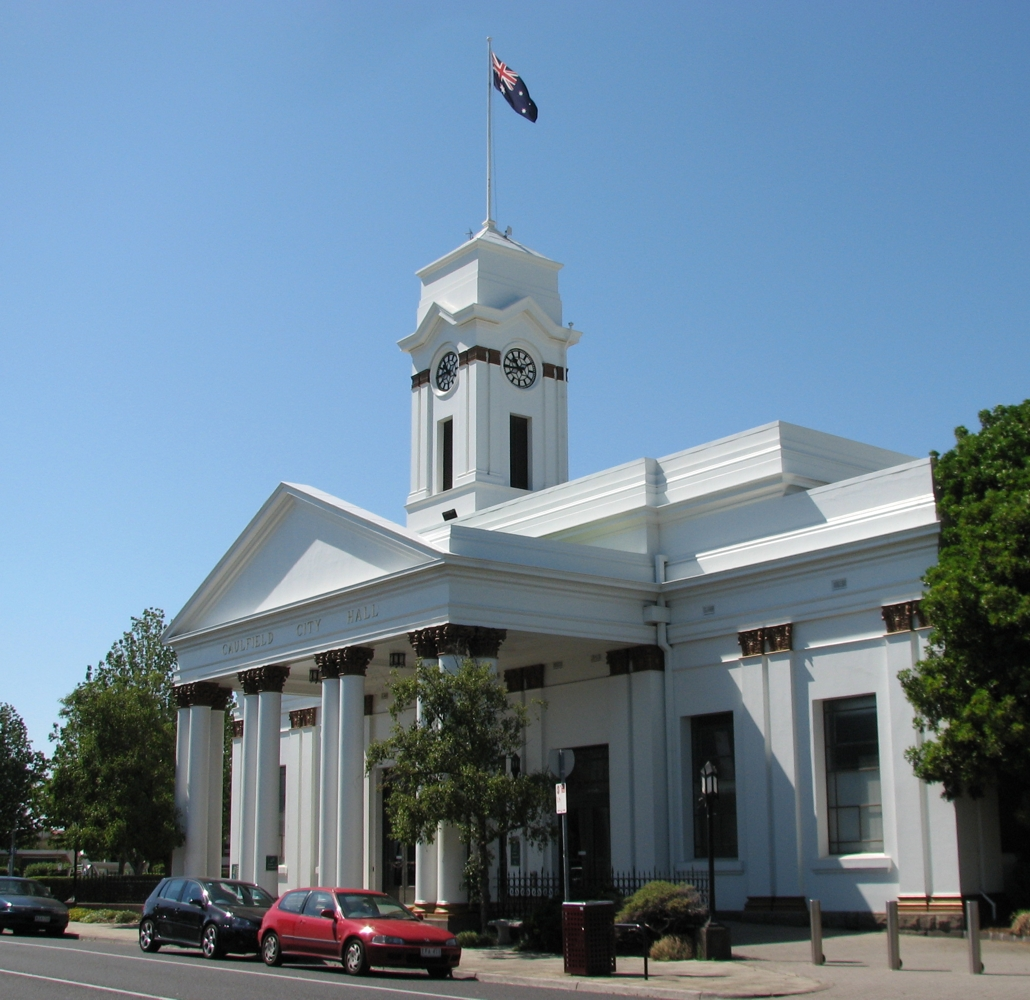
- Location in Melbourne Caulfield Town Hall, currently known as Glen Eira Town Hall

- The extent of the City of Caulfield at its dissolution in 1994
- Country: Australia
- State: Victoria
- Region: Southeast Melbourne
- Established: 1857
- Council seat: Caulfield

Area
  - Total: 21.97 km^{2} (8.48 sq mi)

Population
  - Total(s): 71,600 (1992)
  - Density: 3,259.0/km^{2} (8,441/sq mi)
- County: Bourke
LGAs around City of Caulfield
Prahran	Malvern	Malvern
St Kilda	City of Caulfield	Oakleigh
Brighton	Moorabbin	Moorabbin

The City of Caulfield was a local government area about 10 kilometres (6 mi) southeast of Melbourne, the state capital of Victoria, Australia. The city covered an area of 21.97 square kilometres (8.48 sq mi), and existed from 1857 until 1994.

== History ==
Caulfield was incorporated as a road district on 15 October 1857, with the first Caulfield Roads Board elected in November 1857. It had control over the roads in an area bounded by Warrigal Road, Hotham Street, Dandenong Road, North Road and Brighton Road. It became a shire on 17 April 1871. In the 1880s, the area was a market gardening district, with 182 hectares (450 acres) under cultivation, but by the end of the century, its character had become more residential. As such, it became a borough on 30 April 1901 and a town on 23 September 1901. It was proclaimed a city on 26 July 1913. On 16 April 1923, it lost part of its area (the current suburb of Hughesdale) to the Borough of Oakleigh.

In the 1990s, the City of Caulfield was originally planned to be abolished and merged with parts of the City of Malvern to form the City of Gardiner. Instead, on 15 December 1994, the City of Caulfield and parts of the City of Moorabbin were merged into the newly created City of Glen Eira. The councillors of both councils were dismissed.

Council meetings were held at the Caulfield Town Hall, built in 1885, at Glen Eira Road and Hawthorn Road, Caulfield. It presently serves as a service centre for the City of Glen Eira.

== Population ==
Year	Population
1911	15,919
1933	65,297
1954	75,217
1958	72,900*
1961	74,859
1966	76,058
1971	81,865
1976	73,630
1981	69,922
1986	67,718
1991	67,776
1992	71,600

* Estimate in the 1958 Victorian Year Book.
