= City of Chelsea =

Coordinates: 38°03′04″S 145°07′19″E

- Local government area
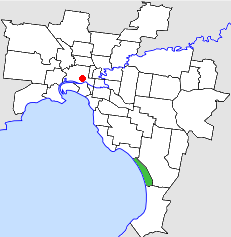
- Location in Melbourne

- The extent of the City of Chelsea
- Country: Australia
- State: Victoria
- Region: Southeast Melbourne
- Established: 1920
- Council seat: Chelsea

Area
  - Total: 12.23 km^{2} (4.72 sq mi)

Population
  - Total: 27,500 (1992)
  - Density: 2,249/km^{2} (5,824/sq mi)
- County: Mornington
LGAs around City of Chelsea
Mordialloc	Springvale	Springvale
Port Phillip	City of Chelsea	Springvale
Port Phillip	Frankston	Frankston

The City of Chelsea was a local government area about 30 kilometres (19 mi) south of Melbourne, the state capital of Victoria, Australia, on the eastern side of Port Phillip. The city covered an area of 12.23 square kilometres (4.72 sq mi), and existed from 1920 until 1994.

== History ==
Chelsea was originally part of the Shire of Dandenong, and was severed and incorporated as the Borough of Carrum in May 1920. It was proclaimed the City of Chelsea on 8 May 1929.

On 15 December 1994, the City of Chelsea was abolished, and along with the City of Mordialloc and parts of the Cities of Moorabbin, Oakleigh and Springvale, was merged into the newly created City of Kingston.

Council meetings were held at Chelsea Town Hall at 316 Station Street, Chelsea. It presently serves as a council service centre and library for the City of Kingston.

== Wards ==
The City of Chelsea was subdivided into three wards, each electing three councillors:

- North Ward
- Centre Ward
- South Ward

== Suburbs ==
- Aspendale
- Carrum
- Chelsea*
- Edithvale

* Council seat.

== Population ==
Year	Population
1954	16,857
1958	20,600*
1961	22,355
1966	24,757
1971	26,372
1976	26,357
1981	26,034
1986	25,803
1991	25,822

* Estimate in the 1958 Victorian Year Book.
