= Wall padding =

Wall padding may go by a variety of names, including; Softwall, Wainscott, Cushion Wall, Safety Padding, and more.

== Purpose ==
The primary purpose of wall padding is to provide a safe level of absorption for an individual making impact with an established object. Often these objects are walls (hence “wall padding”), but also these pads commonly protect bleachers, stage fronts, I-Beams, goal posts, columns, and fences.

== Standard Sizes ==
Typical indoor wall panels are 24” wide x 72” high. In recent history however many newly constructed schools and universities have made a push for 84” high padding in their basketball facilities, where athletes are often elevated in motion. In grappling and wrestling facilities pads are regularly 60” since most movement occurs on the ground.

Outdoor stadium padding is 48” wide x 96” high. However, when working with a skilled manufacturer all dimensions can often be easily customized to fit the unique needs of your facility.

== Composition ==
Standard quality indoor wall panel will begin with a 7/16” osb (oriented strand board) backer. To that, a layer of foam will be laminated. For indoor panels the standard thickness of foam is 2”, but which type 2” foam is laminated to the backer is the most important part of the pad (see foam). After these steps have been completed a 16 oz. vinyl cover is stapled over the face and onto the back of the pad.

== Foam ==
Foam used in manufacturing wall padding is typically a polyurethane based foam, but can vary based on a specification written, or simply customer preference.

== Vinyl ==
Vinyl range from 14 oz. to 18 oz. in weight, and typically has a light leather emboss pattern engrained into the good side of the material. There are at least 16 standard colors to choose from. Vinyl should also be expected to meet fire retardant test NFPA-701 and ASTM E84

== Installation Methods ==
The most common installation methods are; standard method, nailing margin, and z-clip.

Standard method is a process in which panels are toe nailed in with a finishing nailer. Most often this method is done by professionals. If the surface the pads are being installed on is capable of being nailed into, pads will often be mounted directly to that surface. However, if the surface is unable to be nailed into, like cinder block, then firing strip will be mounted first, and the pads mounted to them.

Nailing margin is a process in which the manufacturer will intentionally leave 1” of foam off the top and bottom of the panel. This 1” area is meant to allow the installer to drill directly through the panel, without damaging, or compromising the pad. If the surface the pads are being installed on is capable of being screwed into, pads will often be mounted directly to that surface. However, if the surface is unable to be drilled into, like cinder block, then firing strip will be mounted first, and the pads mounted to them.

Z-clip is a process in which the panels are hung with male/female aluminum channeling. An installer will first mount the female side of the aluminum clip to the wall (typically in 6’ lengths). The installer will then mount the male side of the clip to the panel (typically 22” lengths). To hang the panels, the installer will drop the panel with the male clip into the female clip on the wall. These pads will appear the same as standard method pads on from head on, but can also be removed from the wall because of the male/female clip.

== Upgrades ==
Graphics art work is common upgrade that can be made to most any pad, in the manufacturing process.
