= City of Waverley =

Coordinates: 37°53′S 145°10′E

- Local government area
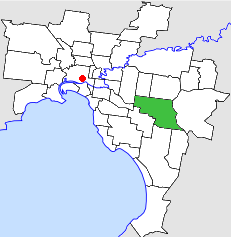
- Location in Melbourne

- The extent of the City of Waverley at its dissolution in 1994
- Country: Australia
- State: Victoria
- Region: Eastern Melbourne
- Established: 1857
- Council seat: Glen Waverley

Area
  - Total: 60.86 km^{2} (23.50 sq mi)

Population
  - Total: 125,400 (1992)
  - Density: 2,060.5/km^{2} (5,336.6/sq mi)
- County: Bourke
LGAs around City of Waverley
Box Hill	Nunawading	Knox
Camberwell; Malvern	City of Waverley	Knox
Oakleigh	Springvale	Dandenong

The City of Waverley was a local government area about 20 kilometres (12 mi) east-southeast of Melbourne, the state capital of Victoria, Australia. The city covered an area of 60.86 square kilometres (23.5 sq mi), and existed from 1857 until 1994. Waverley was bounded to the west by Warrigal Road, to the east by Dandenong Creek, to the north by Highbury Road, and to the South by Police Road.

== History ==
In 1853, Dr James Silverman, a Russian emigrant who had gained medical qualifications in England, moved to Australia. The following year, 1854, Silverman created a privately surveyed township from 160 acres of land he had purchased south-east of the corner of High Street Road and Stephensons Road, the lots being laid out by a surveyor named Newson. The Waverley Historical Society speculates that Silverman or Newson were interested in Sir Walter Scott's Waverley novels, after which the area appears to be named, and also in the court of Charles II of England – the House of Stuart being featured in the Waverley novels. Several streets in the township were named after Charles and members of his court. The first house lot in the Waverley township was sold in 1854. While the township was not successful, the name Waverley was re-used in the suburb names, Mount Waverley and Glen Waverley.

Waverley was first incorporated as the Oakleigh Road District in January 1857, which became the Shire of Oakleigh in December 1871. Parts of the Central and South Ridings were severed to create the Oakleigh Borough, which went on to become the City of Oakleigh on 13 March 1891. The remainder was renamed the Shire of Mulgrave on 19 February 1897. In 1949 and 1959, further areas were annexed to the City of Oakleigh. On 14 April 1961, the Shire of Mulgrave became the City of Waverley.

Council meetings were held at Waverley Town Hall, on Springvale Road, Glen Waverley. It presently serves as the council seat for the City of Monash.

In the post-war period until the 1970s, housing in Waverley was predominantly houses constructed from brick on generously-sized lots, attracting middle-class families. This resulted in a large number of schools having to be built: Waverley had 34 primary schools and 14 secondary schools by 1990. Later, as children in the area moved out of home, by 1993 Waverley had one of the fastest-declining populations in Victoria. In 1985, the City of Waverley issued a commemorative medal to celebrate the sesquicentenary of Victoria.

On 15 December 1994, the City of Waverley was abolished, and along with parts of the City of Oakleigh, was merged into the newly created City of Monash. Before the amalgamations, the Cities of Knox and Waverley were the state's two most populous municipalities, with around 125,000 residents each.

== Wards ==
The City of Waverley was subdivided into four wards on 31 May 1971, each electing three councillors:

- West Ward
- Centre Ward
- East Ward
- South Ward

== Suburbs ==
- Ashwood
- Burwood (shared with the Cities of Box Hill and Camberwell)
- Glen Waverley*
- Jordanville
- Mount Waverley
- Mulgrave
- Notting Hill
- Wheelers Hill

* Council seat.

== Population ==
Year	Population
1954	20,293
1958	39,300*
1961	44,971
1966	69,832
1971	97,033
1976	117,144
1981	122,471
1986	122,935
1991	118,265

* Estimate in the 1958 Victorian Year Book.
