= City of Oakleigh =

Coordinates: 37°54′47″S 145°06′07″E

- Local government area
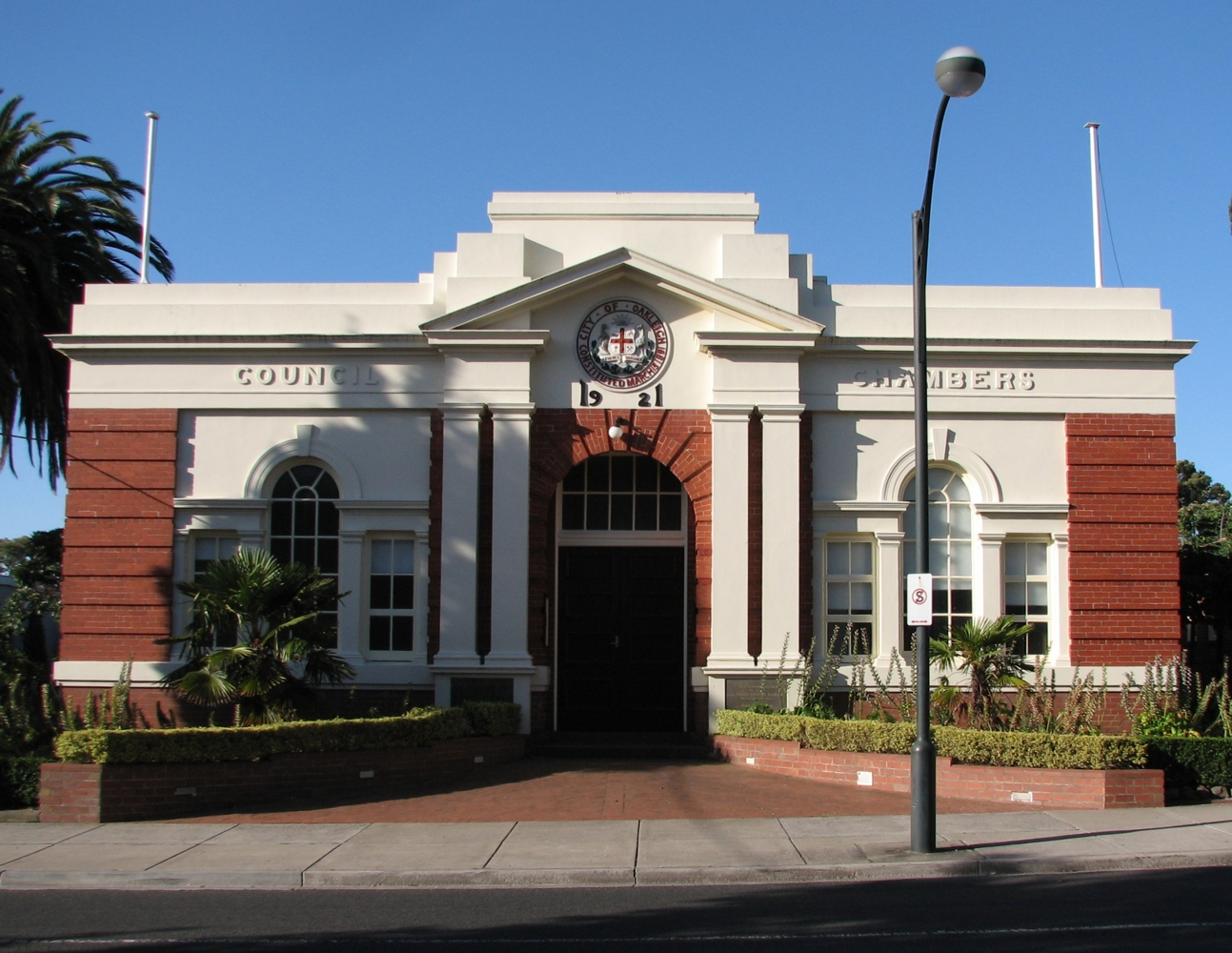
- Former Council Chambers in Atherton Road

- The extent of the City of Oakleigh at its dissolution in 1994
- Country: Australia
- State: Victoria
- Region: Southeastern Melbourne
- Established: 1891
- Council seat: Oakleigh

Area
  - Total: 30.30 km^{2} (11.70 sq mi)

Population
  - Total(s): 56,300 (1992)
  - Density: 1,858.1/km^{2} (4,812/sq mi)
- County: Bourke
LGAs around City of Oakleigh
Malvern	Waverley	Waverley
Caulfield	City of Oakleigh	Springvale
Moorabbin	Moorabbin	Springvale

The City of Oakleigh was a local government area about 15 kilometres (9 mi) southeast of Melbourne, the state capital of Victoria, Australia. The city covered an area of 30.30 square kilometres (11.70 sq mi), and existed from 1891 until 1994.

== History ==
Oakleigh was initially part of the Oakleigh Road District in January 1857, which became the Shire of Oakleigh in December 1871. Parts of the Central and South Ridings were severed to create the Oakleigh Borough on 13 March 1891. The remainder was renamed the Shire of Mulgrave in 1897, and went on to become the City of Waverley.

On 16 April 1913, Oakleigh annexed part of the City of Caulfield, and went on to be declared a town on 19 February 1924, and a city on 2 August 1927. It annexed part of the Shire of Mulgrave on 15 December 1949, which became the East Ward, and on 1 October 1959, Oakleigh incorporated small areas of land from all surrounding areas.

On 15 December 1994, the City of Oakleigh was abolished, and along with the City of Waverley, was merged into the newly created City of Monash. The suburb of Clayton South was transferred to the newly created City of Kingston, to join parts of the former Cities of Chelsea, Moorabbin and Springvale.

=== Council chambers ===
When the rebuilt Oakleigh Mechanics' Institute was opened in July 1906, the council chambers were relocated there. This building, now known as Oakleigh Hall, is located in Drummond Street. In 1921, the chambers were relocated to a purpose-built facility in Atherton Road, which currently houses the Monash Seminar & Training Centre.

== Wards ==
The City of Oakleigh was subdivided into four wards on 1 April 1985, each electing three councillors:

- North Ward
- South Ward
- East Ward
- West Ward

== Suburbs ==
- Chadstone
- Clarinda (shared with the City of Moorabbin)
- Clayton
- Clayton South
- Hughesdale
- Huntingdale
- Monash University (Clayton campus)
- Oakleigh*
- Oakleigh East
- Oakleigh South (shared with the City of Moorabbin)

* Council seat.

== Population ==
Year	Population
1954	24,305
1958	29,200*
1961	48,017+
1966	52,743
1971	57,284
1976	54,532
1981	55,612
1986	55,764
1991	55,151

* Estimate in the 1958 Victorian Year Book.
* Includes all territory added in 1959.
