= City of Sandringham =

Coordinates: 37°56′56″S 145°00′18″E

City of Sandringham Victoria
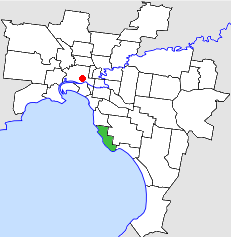
- Location in Melbourne
- The extent of the City of Sandringham at its dissolution in 1994
- Population: 32,500 (1992)
  - Density: 2,171/km^{2} (5,623/sq mi)
- Established: 1917
- Area: 14.97 km^{2} (5.8 sq mi)
- Council seat: Sandringham
- Region: Southeastern Melbourne
- County: Bourke
LGAs around City of Sandringham:
Brighton	Brighton	Moorabbin
Port Phillip	City of Sandringham	Moorabbin
Port Phillip	Port Phillip	Mordialloc

The City of Sandringham was a local government area about 20 kilometres (12 mi) south of Melbourne, the state capital of Victoria, Australia, on the eastern side of Port Phillip. The city covered an area of 14.97 square kilometres (5.78 sq mi), and existed from 1917 until 1994.

== History ==
Sandringham was originally part of the Shire of Moorabbin, and was severed and incorporated as the Borough of Sandringham on 28 February 1917. It was proclaimed a town on 9 April 1919, and a city on 21 March 1923.

On 15 December 1994, the City of Sandringham was abolished, and along with the City of Brighton and parts of the City of Moorabbin, plus the eastern section of Beaumaris from the City of Mordialloc, was merged into the newly created City of Bayside.

Council meetings were held at the Municipal Offices, on Royal Avenue, Sandringham. It presently serves as a corporate centre for the City of Bayside.

== Wards ==
The City of Sandringham was subdivided into three wards on 15 September 1970, each electing three councillors:

- North Ward
- Centre Ward
- South Ward

== Suburbs ==
- Beaumaris (shared with the City of Moorabbin and the City of Mordialloc)
- Black Rock
- Cheltenham (shared with the City of Moorabbin)
- Hampton
- Sandringham*

* Council seat.

== Former Mayors ==
Former Mayors of Sandringham
Year	Mayor
1917-18	Cr. B.J. Ferdinando
1918-19	Cr. B. Champion
1919-20	Cr. W.G. Knott
1920-21	Cr. T.G. Farrant
1921-22	Cr. H.B. Grace
1922-23	Cr. J.T.D. Beck
1923-24	Cr. C.A. Hartsman
1924-25	F.N. Gibbs
1925-26	Cr. R. Chisholm
1926-27	Cr. J.M. Ramsay
1927-28	Cr. W.H. Kay
1928-29	Cr. Bartram
1929-30	Cr. T.G. Farrant
1930-31	Cr. J.L. Brown
1931-32	Cr. C.A. Hartsman
1932-33	Cr. G.A. Brown
1933-34	Cr. A.J. Steele
1934-35	Cr. W.L. Simpson
1935-36	Cr. F.B. Menadue
1936-37	Cr. J.T. Barnes
1937-38	Cr. J. Sillitoe
1938-39	Cr. F.L. Yott
1939-40	Cr. A.J. Steele
1940-41	Cr. W.A. Sandall
1941-42	Cr. L.H. Innes
1942-43	Cr. H. Wilkinson
1943-44	Cr. W.L. Simpson
1944-45	Cr. G.A. Brown
1945-46	Cr. W. McKay
1946-47	Cr. T.M. Grant
1947-48	Cr. F.L. Yott
1948-49	Cr. H. Wilkinson
1949-50	Cr. R.J. Sillitoe
1950-51	Cr. J.R. Cleworth
1951-52	Cr. A.J. Steele
1952-53	Cr. T.I. Duff
1953-54	Cr. J.R. Cleworth
1954-55	Cr. R.G. Chisholm
1955-56	Cr. H. Nankervis
1956-57	Cr J. Berg
1957-58	Cr. G.A. Brown
1958-59	Cr. G.R. Barnett
1959-60	Cr. J.N. Martin
1960-61	Cr. W.A. Johnson
1961-62	Cr. T.I. Duff
1962-63	Cr. C.J. Lucas
1963-64	Cr. R.G. Chisholm
1964-65	Cr. D.M. Lockburn
1965-66	Cr. A.E. Beckett
1966-67	Cr. W.A. Adams
1967-68	Cr. R.M. Ivison
1968-69	Cr. J.N. Martin
1969-70	Cr. W.A. Adams
1970-71	Cr. L. Soulsby
1971-72	Cr. J.W. Merkus
1972-73	Cr. A.E. Beckett
1973-74	Cr. R.M. Ivison
1974-75	Cr. F.M. Collings
1975-76	Cr. G.W. Evans
1976-77	Cr. P.A. Gundry-White
1977-78	Cr. J.L.A. Bottomley
1978-79	Cr. W.R. Andrew
1979-80	Cr. J.L. Brighthope
1980-81	Cr. J.W. Merkus
1981-82	Cr. M.J. Harwood
1982-83	Cr. L.Y. Falloon OAM
1983-84	Cr. C.J. Waters
1984-85	Cr. J.F. Bissett
1985-86	Cr. C.E. Watson
1986-87	Cr. J.L.A. Bottomley
1987-88	Cr. P.A. Reynolds
1988-89	Cr. M.R. Hanlin
1989-90	Cr. J.M. Moller
1990-91	Cr. L. Evans
1991-92	Cr. L.Y. Falloon OAM
1992-93	Cr. A.N. Reinhardt
1993-94	Cr. S.T. Russell
1994	Cr. C.E. Watson

== Population ==
Year	Population
1921	11,316
1947	26,435
1954	31,758
1958	36,800*
1961	37,001
1966	36,644
1971	35,460
1976	32,698
1981	31,175
1986	30,416
1991	30,319

* Estimate in the 1958 Victorian Year Book.
