= City of Moorabbin =

Coordinates: 37°56′S 145°02′E

- Local government area
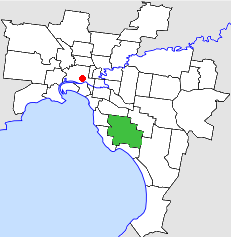
- Location in Melbourne

- The extent of the City of Moorabbin at its dissolution in 1994
- Country: Australia
- State: Victoria
- Region: Southeastern Melbourne
- Established: 1862
- Council seat: Moorabbin

Area
  - Total: 53.13 km^{2} (20.51 sq mi)

Population
  - Total: 100,400 (1992)
  - Density: 1,889.7/km^{2} (4,894.3/sq mi)
- County: Bourke
LGAs around City of Moorabbin
Brighton	Caulfield	Oakleigh
Sandringham	City of Moorabbin	Springvale
Sandringham	Mordialloc	Springvale

The City of Moorabbin was a local government area about 20 kilometres (12 mi) southeast of Melbourne, the state capital of Victoria, Australia. The city covered an area of 53.13 square kilometres (20.51 sq mi), and existed from 1862 until 1994.

== History ==
Moorabbin was first incorporated as a road district on 16 May 1862. It became a shire on 27 January 1871, and was essentially rural in character, relying on the villages on its western side for services. As regions on the coast became more urban in character, local severance movements successfully obtained their own local governments. On 3 April 1912, one part was united with the Town of Brighton to the northwest. On 28 February 1917, the Borough of Sandringham split away, while on 26 May 1920, the Borough of Mentone and Mordialloc also split away. Eventually, with the development of areas such as Bentleigh and Cheltenham within the shire's boundaries, Moorabbin was proclaimed a city, on 10 October 1934. On 1 October 1959, it lost a further piece of land to the City of Oakleigh.

On 15 December 1994, the City of Moorabbin was abolished, and was split three ways; Bentleigh was transferred into the newly created City of Glen Eira, along with the City of Caulfield; half of Cheltenham was transferred into the newly created City of Bayside, along with the Cities of Brighton and Sandringham; while the bulk of the city merged with the Cities of Chelsea and Mordialloc, and parts of the Cities of Oakleigh and Springvale, to become the newly created City of Kingston.

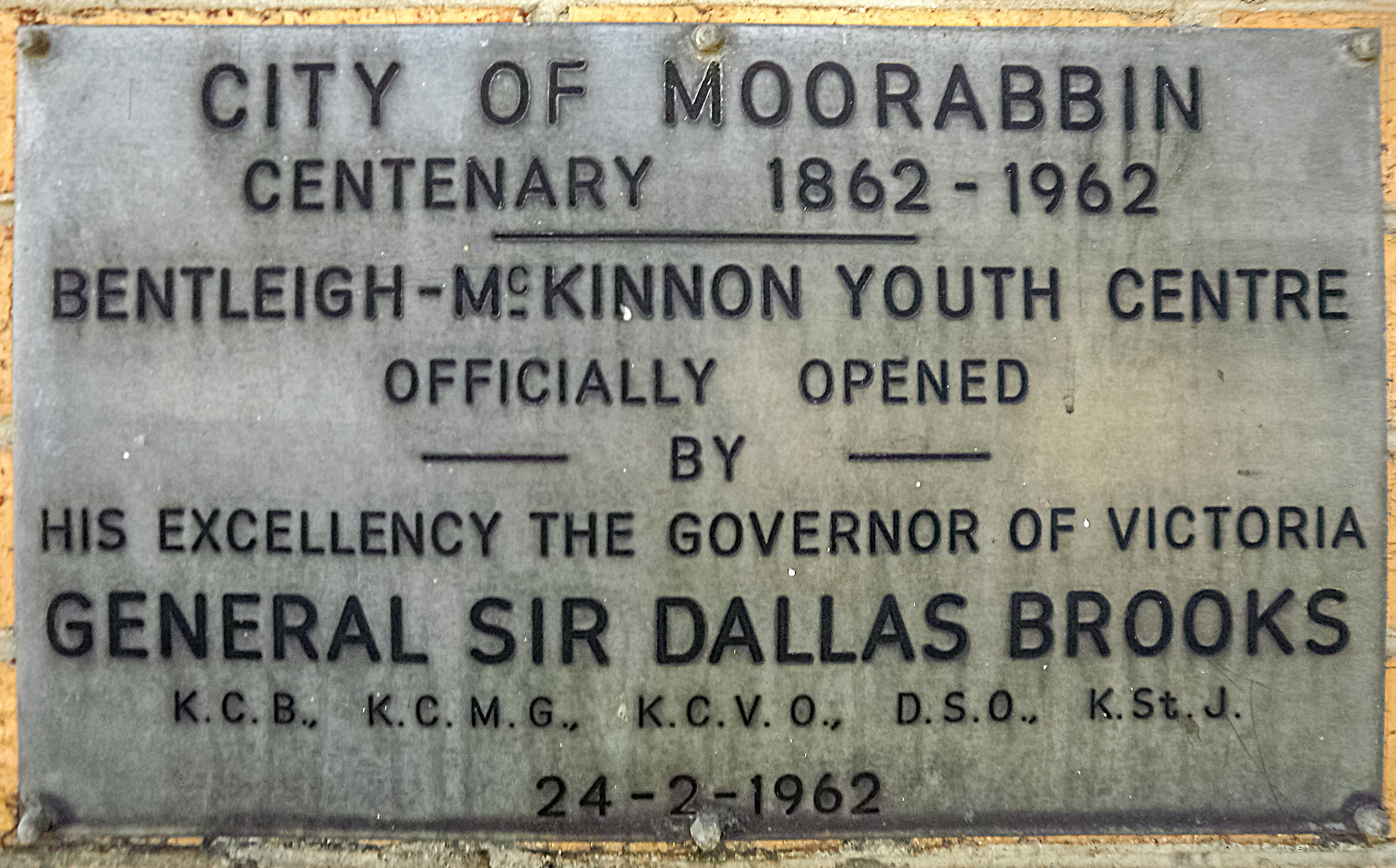
Plaque of City of Moorabbin

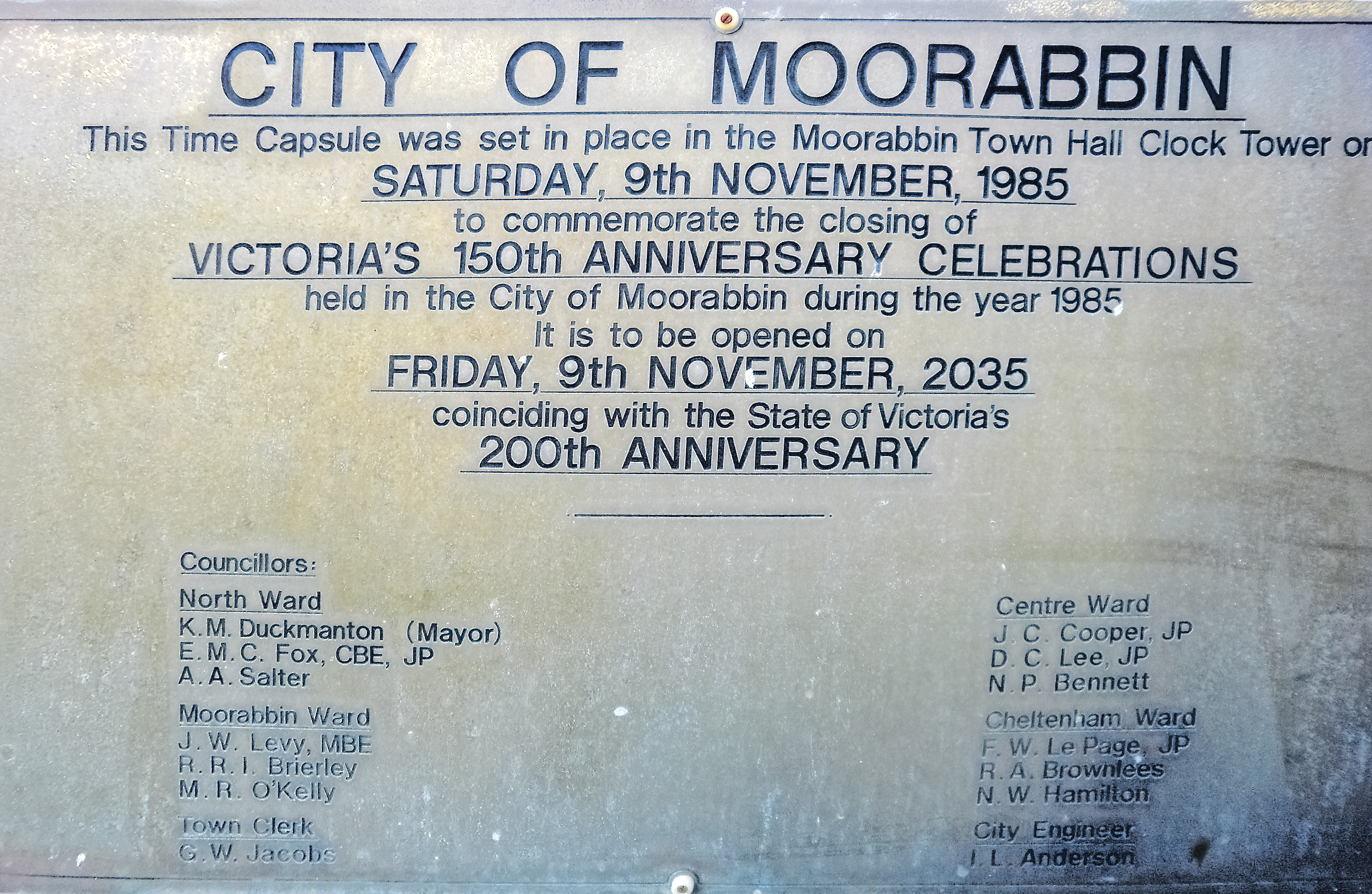
Plaque of City of Moorabbin

=== Municipal offices ===
The council originally met in the Plough and Harrow Hotel, a site now occupied by the Moorabbin Junction Hotel, on the corner of the Nepean Highway and South Road, Moorabbin. The first town hall was built on the other side of South Road in 1867, and enlarged in 1907. In 1931, municipal offices were constructed next to the town hall. A new town hall, designed by Bates, Smart and McCutcheon, was officially opened in 1963, near the Moorabbin railway station. In 1970, new council chambers and meeting rooms were added.

== Population ==
Year	Population
1958	86,800*

* Estimate in the 1958 Victorian Year Book.
