= List of places on the Victorian Heritage Register in the City of Whitehorse =

This is a list of places on the Victorian Heritage Register in the City of Whitehorse in Victoria, Australia. The Victorian Heritage Register is maintained by the Heritage Council of Victoria.

The Victorian Heritage Register, as of 2020, lists the following 10 state-registered places within the City of Whitehorse:

| Place name | Place id | Location | City / Town | Co-ordinates | Built | Date registered | Photo |
|---|---|---|---|---|---|---|---|
| All Saints' Anglican Church | H2302 | 418 Edward St | Mitcham | 37°48′58″S 145°11′29″E | 1958 | 9 August 2012 | |
| Box Hill Cemetery Columbarium and Myer Memorial | H2045 | 395 Middleborough Rd | Box Hill | 37°49′22″S 145°08′01″E | 1929 | 9 October 2003 | |
| Chapel of St Joseph (former) | H2351 | 27-29 Strabane Ave | Mont Albert North | 37°48′28″S 145°06′44″E | 1978 | 11 February 2016 | |
| Old Burwood Primary School | H0975 | 172 Burwood Hwy | Burwood | 37°51′01″S 145°06′22″E | 1865 | 20 August 1982 | |
| Standard Brickworks | H0720 | 14 Federation St | Box Hill | 37°49′27″S 145°06′58″E | 1884 | 20 September 1989 | |
| Stone Pipe Organ | H2166 | The Avenue Uniting Church; 40-44 Blackburn Rd | Blackburn | 37°49′22″S 145°09′07″E | 1879 | 14 August 2008 | |
| Wattle Park | H0904 | 1012 Riversdale Rd | Burwood | 37°50′20″S 145°06′08″E | 1920 | 1 April 1992 | |
| Willis Pipe Organ | H2156 | Wesley Uniting Church; 8 Oxford St | Box Hill | 37°49′18″S 145°07′21″E | 1877 | 8 May 2008 | |
| Woodhouse Grove Wesleyan Chapel (former) | H2010 | 147 Woodhouse Grove | Box Hill | 37°48′08″S 145°07′55″E | 1856 | 19 December 2002 | |
| Wunderlich Terracotta Roof Tiles Complex | H1008 | 656 Mitcham Rd | Vermont | 37°49′59″S 145°11′30″E | 1925 | 19 December 1996 | |
