= Box Hill City Band =

Australian brass band

Founded in 1889 Box Hill City Band, formerly the Box Hill Temperance Band, Reporter District Brass Band, and Box Hill District Band, is one of the oldest brass bands in Victoria, Australia.

== History ==
The Box Hill Temperance Band was formed in 1889 by the temperance movement in Box Hill.

The first recorded performance of the band was on 24 May 1889 as part of the Queen Victoria birthday celebrations.

Shortly after their beginning the band is known to have disbanded, or ceased for a short span of time around 1890 and 1893. The exact dates of the band's short disbandment then re-formation are currently unconfirmed.

A photo of the band in 1890 names the band as the Box Hill United Methodists Brass Band, which suggests a change of administration took place.

On September 27, 1895, the "Box Hill Reporter" published an article regarding the Band, which included this excerpt:
"This band seems to have had a somewhat chequered career. Formerly it was connected with the temperance society here: the cold water element, however was too weak to sustain it and collapse No. 1 followed. It was then taken in hand by a more general committee and just as efficiency on the part of its members was anticipated, collapse No. 2 came. It is now feared that nothing can prevent a general break-up, but we sincerely hope such will not be the case."(4)

In 1901 the band was reformed as the Box Hill Military Band. In 1906 the band voted to rename themselves the Box Hill District Band.

Under the sponsorship of the Box Hill Reporter newspaper the band carried the name "Reporter District Brass Band" from December 1909. The band continued under this name for some years until it became known as the Box Hill District Band when the sponsorship ceased. The exact date of this change is unconfirmed.

When the City of Box Hill was proclaimed in 1927 the band was renamed Box Hill City Band.

During world war 2 the band faced its third break as the men from the band served in the military services. Reforming around 1951.

The band continues today under the Box Hill City Band name as a Grade B brass band within the Victorian Bands League.
