= Box Hill Town Hall =

Civic building in Victoria, Australia

Coordinates: 37°49′09″S 145°07′36″E

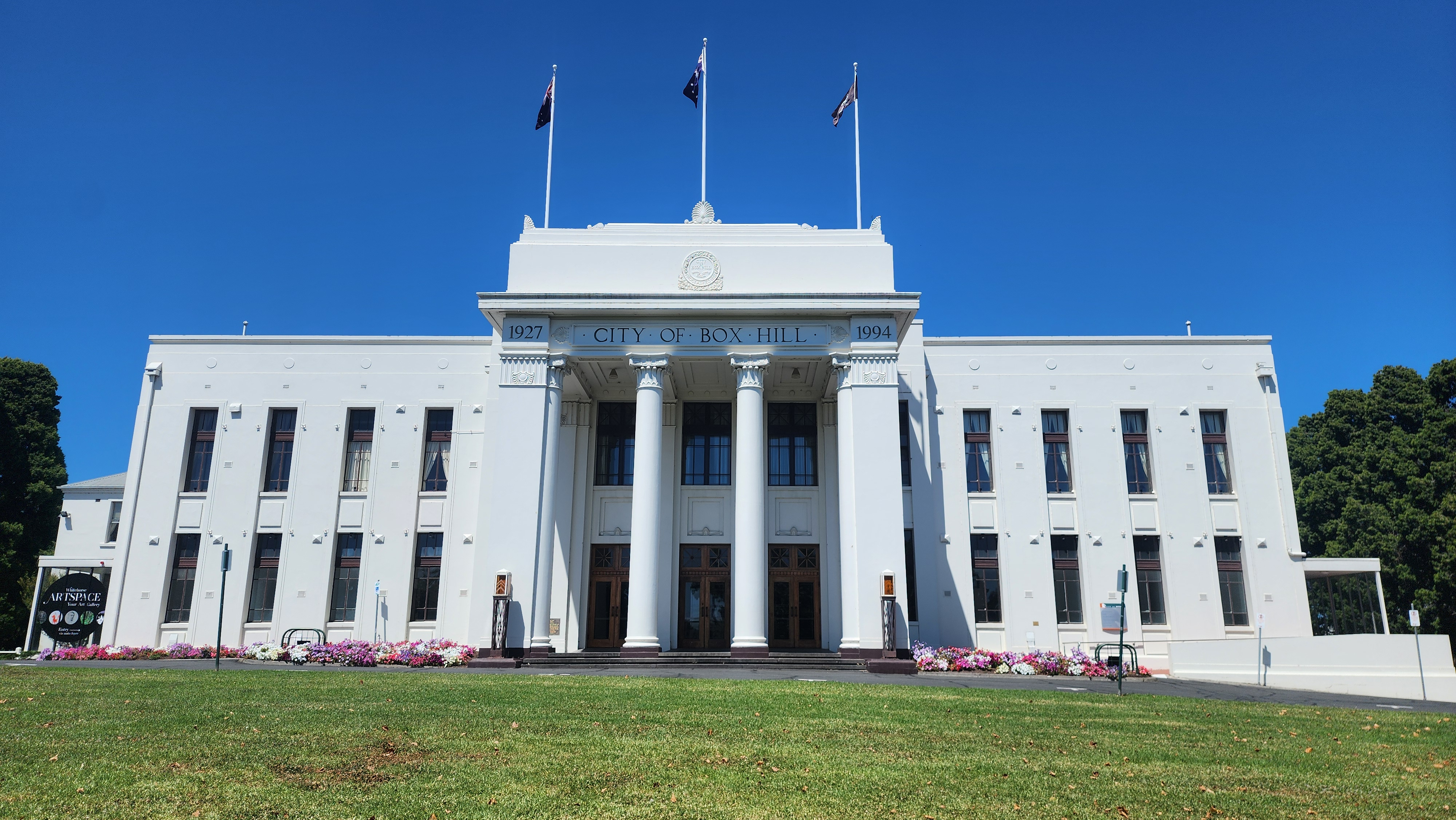
Box Hill Town Hall

The Box Hill Town Hall is a landmark civic building located on Whitehorse Road, Box Hill, Victoria, Australia. Designed in the Neo-Grec style by architects JS Gawler and JCA Isbett, the town hall was built between 1934 and 1935. It was the administrative and community headquarters of the City of Box Hill prior to that city's amalgamation with the City of Nunawading to form the new City of Whitehorse in 1994.

The town hall is described as having "regional architectural, historic and social importance" by the National Trust of Australia (Victoria). Its imposing façade has been utilised by the television series Neighbours as the external setting for the court house in the fictional town of Erinsborough. The interior includes a main hall and other community and meeting spaces. There are two dates engraved on the town hall's portico – 1927, the year Box Hill was proclaimed a city, and 1994, the year of amalgamation. The crest of the former City of Box Hill is also featured on the portico.

In 2006, the town hall underwent a $6.5 million redevelopment as a hub for community-based services and programs and a home for the City of Whitehorse arts and historical collections.

== See also ==
- List of Town Halls in Melbourne
