= Forest Hill, Victoria =

Forest Hill
- Suburb
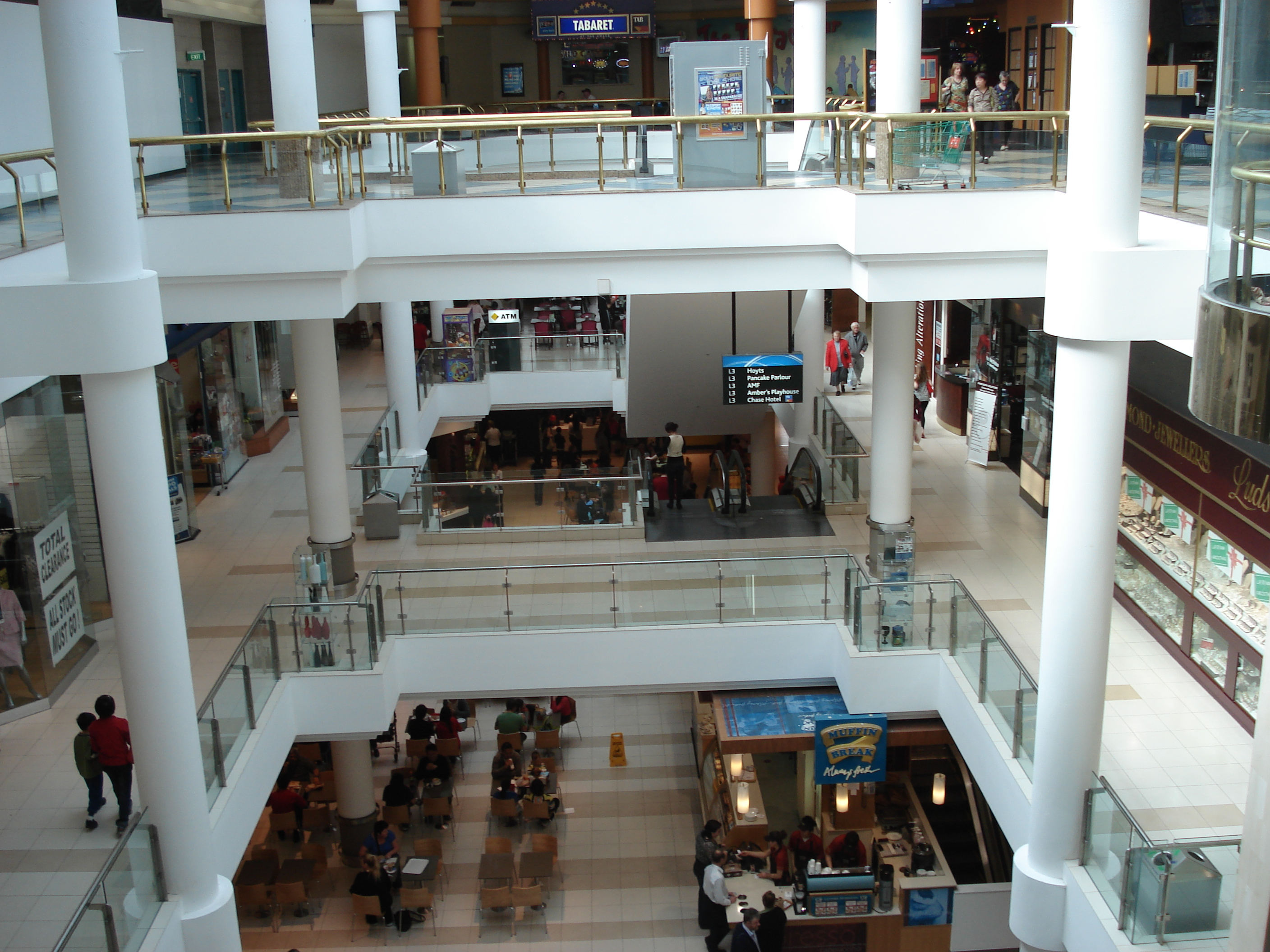
- The three levels of Forest Hill Chase Shopping Centre

- Interactive map of Forest Hill
- Coordinates: 37.842°S 145.172°E
- Country: Australia
- State: Victoria
- City: Melbourne
- LGA: City of Whitehorse
- Location: 18 km (11 mi) from Melbourne

Government
  - State electorates: Glen Waverley; Ringwood
  - Federal divisions: Chisholm; Deakin

Area
  - Total: 4.1 km^{2} (1.6 sq mi)

Population
  - Total: 10,780 (SAL 2021)
- Postcode: 3131
Suburbs around Forest Hill
Blackburn	Nunawading	Mitcham
Blackburn South	Forest Hill	Vermont
Burwood East	Burwood East	Vermont South

Forest Hill is a suburb of Melbourne, Victoria, Australia, 18 km east of Melbourne's Central Business District, located within the City of Whitehorse local government area. Forest Hill recorded a population of 10,780 at the 2021 census.

In 2017 Forest Hill was ranked 93rd on Melbourne's most liveable suburb list.

The suburb is predominantly residential, featuring low to medium-density housing.

== History ==
The area was originally covered by forest before being gradually cleared and cultivated by European settlers beginning in the late 1850s. The Forest Hill Post Office opened on 1 March 1874 in the then rural area. Substantial residential development commenced in the early 1950s, spurred by a post-war population increase.

Until 1994, Forest Hill was a part of the City of Nunawading local government area, but in December 1994 became part of the City of Whitehorse following the amalgamation of the former cities of Box Hill and Nunawading.

=== Mount Pleasant Estate ===
The first modern, medium-density subdivision in the area now designated as Forest Hill was the Mount Pleasant Estate. This created 380 lots in and around Betula Avenue and Eugenia Street, all of which were sold by 1960.

=== Parkmore Estate ===
The largest residential subdivision in Forest Hill was the Parkmore Estate. Land sales began in 1957, and by 1960 over 500 homes had been built in the area between Jolimont and Canterbury Roads. The project, which was touted as Australia's most advanced, was a joint venture between a private subdivider and the Southern Construction Company, which worked with several local real estate agencies.

Parkmore was the first housing estate to have made roads and drainage in Forest Hill, and buyers could chose from five initial brick home designs priced upwards from £4,000. Also on the estate was the Parkmore Shopping Centre (now Brentford Square), which began trading c. 1959–60 as the first modern American-style shopping centre in Nunawading. A smaller strip of shops was located on Springvale Road.

=== Forest Hill Shopping Centre (Forest Hill Chase) ===
Announced in 1957 but delayed until 1964, the Forest Hills Drive-In Shopping Centre (Forest Hill Chase) at Canterbury Road was a landmark development for the area, and in 2025 has around 200 shops and three levels of retail space.

It includes a number of major retailers, such as Coles, Target, Harris Scarfe, Rebel Sport, TK Maxx, Aldi, Woolworths, Hoyts Cinemas and a number of restaurants. There is also a Zone Bowling centre (formerly AMF) and Timezone arcade.

== Demographics ==
In the 2016 census, the population of Forest Hill was 10,626, approximately 52.5% female and 47.5% male.

56.6% of people living in the suburb of Forest Hill were born in Australia. The other top responses for country of birth were China (excludes SARs and Taiwan) 9.8%, India 3.4%, Malaysia 2.8%, Vietnam 2.4% and England 2.2%.

In Forest Hill 57.4% of people only spoke English at home. Other languages spoken at home included Mandarin 11.0%, Cantonese 6.8%, Greek 2.9%, Vietnamese 1.7% and Italian 1.7%. 47.6% of Forest Hill households spoke a language other than English.

The religious makeup of Forest Hill is No Religion, so described 33.1%, Catholic 20.2%, Not stated 7.6%, Anglican 7.5% and Buddhism 6.2%. Christianity was the largest religious group reported overall (50.8%) (this figure excludes not stated responses).

== Industry ==
Fremantle Media's Melbourne production facilities are located on Hawthorn Road in Forest Hill, where the soap opera Neighbours was produced.

== Education ==
Forest Hill has one school located within the suburb, Parkmore Primary School. Nearby public and private schools are Burwood Heights Primary School, Mount Pleasant Road Primary School, Forest Hill College, Emmaus Catholic College and St. Timothy's Catholic Primary School.

== Sport ==
Aqualink Nunawading in Fraser Place has an indoor, Olympic-size swimming pool, children's pool and gym and is the home of the Nunawading Swimming Club which has produced several Australian representatives. The Forest Hill Cricket Club and Forest Hill Football Club are located at Forest Hill Reserve in Fraser Place. The Nunawading Cricket Club, Nunawading Football Club (soccer), 1st Tally Ho Scout Group, table tennis club and badminton club are located at Mahoneys Reserve in Mahoneys Road.

== See also ==
- City of Nunawading – Forest Hill was previously within this former local government area.
