= Rosaline Fox =

Rosaline Fox may refer to

- The mother and victim of matricide Sidney Harry Fox
- The wife of Alan Collins
