= Hurtle Rice =

Australian rules footballer

Personal information
- Full name: Hurtle Victor Rice
- Born: 7 July 1884; Box Hill, Victoria
- Died: 25 May 1960 (aged 75); Hughesdale, Victoria

Playing career^{1}
| Years | Club | Games (Goals) |
| 1909 | Essendon | 1 (0) |
- ^{1} Playing statistics correct to the end of 1909.

Hurtle Victor Rice (7 July 1884 – 25 May 1960) was an Australian rules footballer who played with Essendon in the Victorian Football League (VFL).
