= Blackburn South =

- Suburb
- Interactive map of Blackburn South
- Coordinates: 37.838°S 145.144°E
- Country: Australia
- State: Victoria
- City: Melbourne
- LGA: City of Whitehorse
- Location: 16 km (9.9 mi) from Melbourne

Government
  - State electorates: Box Hill; Glen Waverley
  - Federal divisions: Deakin; Menzies

Area
  - Total: 3.5 km^{2} (1.4 sq mi)
- Elevation: 107 m (351 ft)

Population
  - Total: 10,939 (SAL 2021)
- Postcode: 3130
Suburbs around Blackburn South
Box Hill	Blackburn	Nunawading
Box Hill South	Blackburn South	Forest Hill
Burwood	Burwood East	Burwood East

Blackburn South is a suburb of Melbourne, Victoria, Australia, 16 km east of Melbourne's Central Business District, located within the City of Whitehorse local government area. Blackburn South recorded a population of 10,939 at the 2021 census.

Blackburn South is bordered by Canterbury Road, Middleborough Road, Eley Road, and by an irregular line to the east of Blackburn Road.

== History ==
Prior to development in the 1950s, Blackburn was primarily covered by orchards. Orchard Grove, an important access road through the suburb, was named so for this reason. Some original farm houses still stand in the area. During the 1960s and 1970s Blackburn South was a working-class neighbourhood before becoming a more middle-class neighbourhood in the early 1980s. South Blackburn Post Office on Canterbury Road opened around February 1954 and was renamed Blackburn South around 1957. Kinkuna Post Office on Vicki Street near Blackburn Road opened on 8 October 1960 and closed in 1979.

The Blackburn South Sharps were the most prominent of the 1972-1977 Melbourne sharpie gangs. Sharpies were an early precursor to the Australian phenomenon of bogans. The Blackburn South Sharps have been the subject of several modern exhibitions and documentaries due to the numerous photographs they took around Blackburn South landmarks.

== Transport ==
The major east–west thoroughfare through Blackburn South is Canterbury Road. From the south, it is also accessible from Burwood Highway. Major north–south roads through the suburb include Middleborough Road and Blackburn Road; both connect to the Eastern Freeway.

Blackburn south has also Laburnum Train station and not far from Blackburn and Box Hill Station.

Melbourne PTV bus routes service the area.

== Recreation ==
Blackburn South, and its surrounding areas features several excellent parks. These include Wurundjeri Walk Trail, which provides an excellent creek-side walk. There are cricket ovals at Mirrabooka Oval and Eley Park, the latter also featuring a tennis club. Other smaller parks are also tucked away in the suburb, including Edinburgh Patch and one at Wardle Close, a green corridor between McCracken Avenue and Shawlands Avenue and the Fulton Road – Finch Place link.

== Education ==
Blackburn South is home to Orchard Grove Primary School, St. Luke the Evangelist School, Indra Pre-School, Holbury Children's Centre, and Aurora School.

Its high school, Blackburn South High, was amalgamated into Forest Hill Secondary College as the Blackburn South campus in the early 1990s, but has since been closed and demolished. The Aurora School now sits on the site of the old high school.

Blackburn South was also home to several small primary schools, four of which were amalgamated into Orchard Grove Primary School in 1991. These were Blackburn South (demolished to build housing), Killoura (now the Blackburn English Language School), Mirrabooka (the site that Orchard Grove Primary now sits) and Warrawong (demolished to build housing, although the art room still stands and is now the Eley Park Community Association Warrawong Annex). Blackburn East Primary School, which was not part of the initial amalgamation, closed in 1993.

== Retail ==
Blackburn South itself features shops along Canterbury Road, including a Woolworths and a McDonald's Restaurant. There are also smaller shops, known as milk bars at the corner of Fulton and Holland Road, Indra Road, Vicki Street and Eley Road. It does feature proximity to Blackburn, Box Hill and Forest Hill; easily accessible by either car or bus.

== Places of worship ==
- Blackburn Christadelphians
- St. Luke the Evangelist Catholic Church
- Evangelical Community Church
- St. Edward the Confessor King Anglican Church

== See also ==
- City of Nunawading – Blackburn South was previously within this former local government area.
