= Stan Rodgerson =

Australian rules footballer

Personal information
- Full name: Robert Stanley Rodgerson
- Born: 20 June 1894; Box Hill, Victoria
- Died: 22 December 1955 (aged 61); Malvern, Victoria
- Original team: Scotch College
- Height: 184 cm (6 ft 0 in)

Playing career^{1}
Years	Club	Games (Goals)
1914	Fitzroy	1 (0)
- ^{1} Playing statistics correct to the end of 1914.

Robert Stanley Rodgerson (20 June 1894 – 22 December 1955) was an Australian rules footballer who played with Fitzroy in the Victorian Football League (VFL).
