= Reg Sampson =

Australian rules footballer

Personal information
- Full name: Reginald Sampson
- Born: 3 April 1899; Box Hill, Victoria
- Died: 2 April 1955 (aged 55); West Melbourne, Victoria
- Original team: St Luke's
- Position: Wing

Playing career^{1}
| Years | Club | Games (Goals) |
| 1918–21 | South Melbourne | 25 (3) |
| 1922–23 | Footscray (VFA) | 24 (10) |
- ^{1} Playing statistics correct to the end of 1923.

Reginald Sampson (3 April 1899 – 2 April 1955) was an Australian rules footballer who played with South Melbourne in the Victorian Football League (VFL).

== Family ==
The son of Britain Sampson (1865–1925) and Ellen Maria Sampson, nee Williams, Reginald Sampson was born at Box Hill on 3 April 1899.

== Football ==
Sampson played 25 games over four seasons with South Melbourne, only managing to establish himself as a consistent member of the side in 1919.

In 1922, Sampson transferred to Footscray (then in the Victorian Football Association) where he played for two seasons.
