= Clive Morrison =

Australian rules footballer (1889–1960)

Personal information
- Full name: Clive Howard Morrison
- Born: 5 July 1889; Box Hill, Victoria
- Died: 1 February 1960 (aged 70); Jolimont, Victoria
- Original team: Scotch College
- Height: 182 cm (6 ft 0 in)

Playing career^{1}
Years	Club	Games (Goals)
1909–10	Fitzroy	23 (18)
- ^{1} Playing statistics correct to the end of 1910.

Clive Howard Morrison (5 July 1889 – 1 February 1960) was an Australian rules footballer who played with Fitzroy in the Victorian Football League (VFL).
