= Box Hill Reporter =

Former newspaper in Victoria, Australia

The Box Hill Reporter or The Reporter was a weekly newspaper for Box Hill and surrounding regions of Victoria, Australia 1889–1925 or later.

Trove has OCR-scanned microfilm copies of most issues from No. 1 with a publication date of 26 June 1889 to Vol. XXXVIII No. 12 of 27 March 1925.

== History ==
The Reporter was founded by Samuel Clumpton and managed by Thomas and George Bright. The newspaper published its first edition on 26 June 1889 from an office on 10 Main Street. Editor and proprietor Edward Frederick Goodall Hodges who also created and name sponsored the "Reporter" district cricket and football associations. The newspaper was superseded by The Eastern Gazette and the Blackburn and Mitcham Reporter.
