= Fred Petterson =

Australian rules footballer

Personal information
- Full name: John Frederick Leo Petterson
- Born: 24 March 1897; Box Hill, Victoria
- Died: 22 May 1956 (aged 59); Parkville, Victoria
- Original team: Mitcham
- Height: 168 cm (5 ft 6 in)
- Weight: 67 kg (148 lb)

Playing career^{1}
Years	Club	Games (Goals)
1921	Collingwood	5 (0)
- ^{1} Playing statistics correct to the end of 1921.

John Frederick Leo Petterson (24 March 1897 – 22 May 1956) was an Australian rules footballer who played with Collingwood in the Victorian Football League (VFL).
