= Fred Barnes (footballer) =

Australian rules footballer

Personal information
- Full name: John Myler Frederick Barnes
- Born: 21 February 1921; Box Hill, Victoria
- Died: 13 May 1996 (aged 75)
- Height: 187 cm (6 ft 2 in)
- Weight: 87 kg (192 lb)

Playing career^{1}
Years	Club	Games (Goals)
1946	South Melbourne	3 (2)
1947	Hawthorn	6 (0)
Total		9 (2)
- ^{1} Playing statistics correct to the end of 1947.

John Myler Frederick Barnes (21 February 1921 – 13 May 1996) was an Australian rules footballer who played with South Melbourne and Hawthorn in the Victorian Football League (VFL).

Barnes also served in the Royal Australian Air Force during World War II.
