= Bob McLellan =

Australian rules footballer, born 1916

Personal information
- Full name: Robert Ian McLellan
- Born: 16 March 1916; Box Hill, Victoria
- Died: 11 April 2007 (aged 91); Templestowe, Victoria
- Height: 178 cm (5 ft 10 in)
- Weight: 94 kg (207 lb)

Playing career^{1}
Years	Club	Games (Goals)
1936–37	Fitzroy	12 (2)
- ^{1} Playing statistics correct to the end of 1937.

Robert Ian McLellan (16 March 1916 – 11 April 2007) was an Australian rules footballer who played with Fitzroy in the Victorian Football League (VFL).

McLellan later served in the Australian Army during World War II, spending 9 months in Borneo in 1945.
