= City of Box Hill =

Coordinates: 37°49′16″S 145°07′30″E

- Local government area
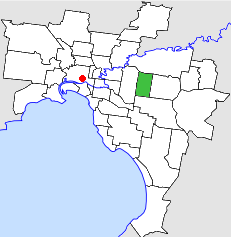
- Location in Melbourne

- The extent of the City of Box Hill at its dissolution in 1994
- Country: Australia
- State: Victoria
- Region: Melbourne
- Established: 1927
- Council seat: Box Hill

Area
  - Total: 21.50 km^{2} (8.30 sq mi)

Population
  - Total: 48,300 (1992)
  - Density: 2,246.5/km^{2} (5,818/sq mi)
- County: Bourke
LGAs around City of Box Hill
Doncaster & Templestowe	Doncaster & Templestowe	Doncaster & Templestowe
Camberwell	City of Box Hill	Nunawading
Camberwell	Waverley	Waverley

The City of Box Hill was a local government area about 15 kilometres (9 mi) east of Melbourne, the state capital of Victoria, Australia. The city covered an area of 21.50 square kilometres (8.30 sq mi), and existed from 1927 until 1994.

== History ==
Box Hill was originally included in the Nunawading Road District, established on 7 August 1857, which became the Shire of Nunawading on 4 May 1872. On 26 May 1925, the eastern part was severed, to create the Shire of Blackburn & Mitcham (which later became the City of Nunawading), with the remainder becoming the Borough of Box Hill on 23 December 1925. It was proclaimed a city on 28 April 1927.

On 15 December 1994, the City of Box Hill was abolished, and along with the City of Nunawading, was merged into the newly created City of Whitehorse.

Council meetings were held at the Box Hill Town Hall, on Bank Street, Box Hill. It is still used for secondary council offices by the City of Whitehorse.

Box Hill has variously supported an eponymous brass band since 1889.

== Wards ==
The City of Box Hill was subdivided into nine wards, each electing one councillor:

- Bennettswood Ward
- Broughton Ward
- Burwood Ward
- Dorking Ward
- Houston Ward
- Kerrimuir Ward
- Koonung Ward
- Mont Albert Ward
- Whitehorse Ward

== Suburbs ==
The City of Box Hill was bounded by Warrigal Road to the west, Koonung Koonung Creek to the north, Middleborough Road to the east and Highbury Road to the south.

- Box Hill*
- Box Hill North
- Box Hill South
- Burwood (shared with the Cities of Camberwell and Waverley)
- Mont Albert
- Mont Albert North
- Surrey Hills (shared with the City of Camberwell)

* Council seat.

== Population ==
Year	Population
1933	15,332
1954	35,554
1958	45,500*
1961	50,412
1966	54,504
1971	54,635
1976	50,280
1981	47,579
1986	45,785
1991	45,139

* Estimate in the 1958 Victorian Year Book.

== Gallery ==
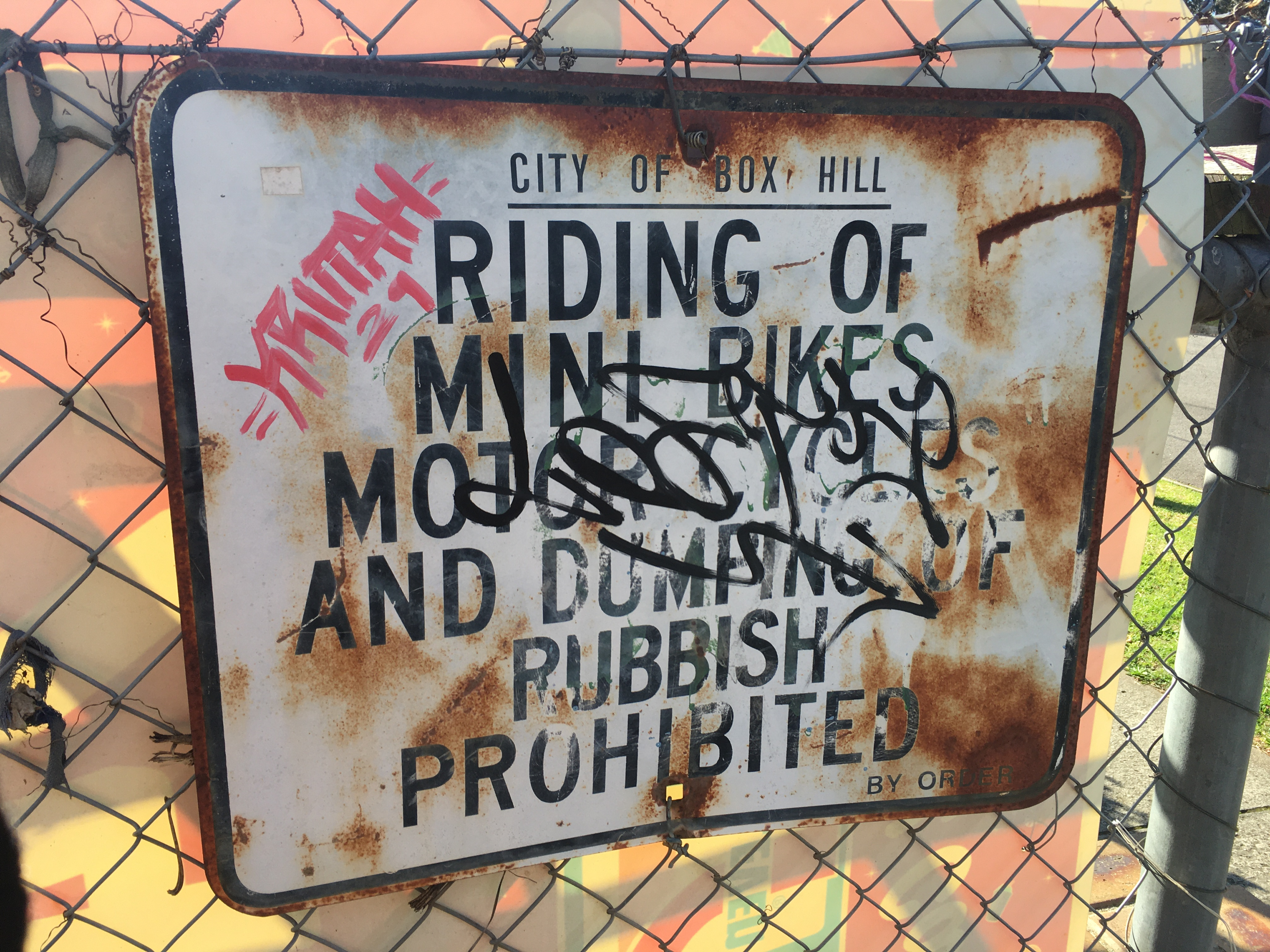
Regulatory sign installed by the City of Box Hill in Box Hill South

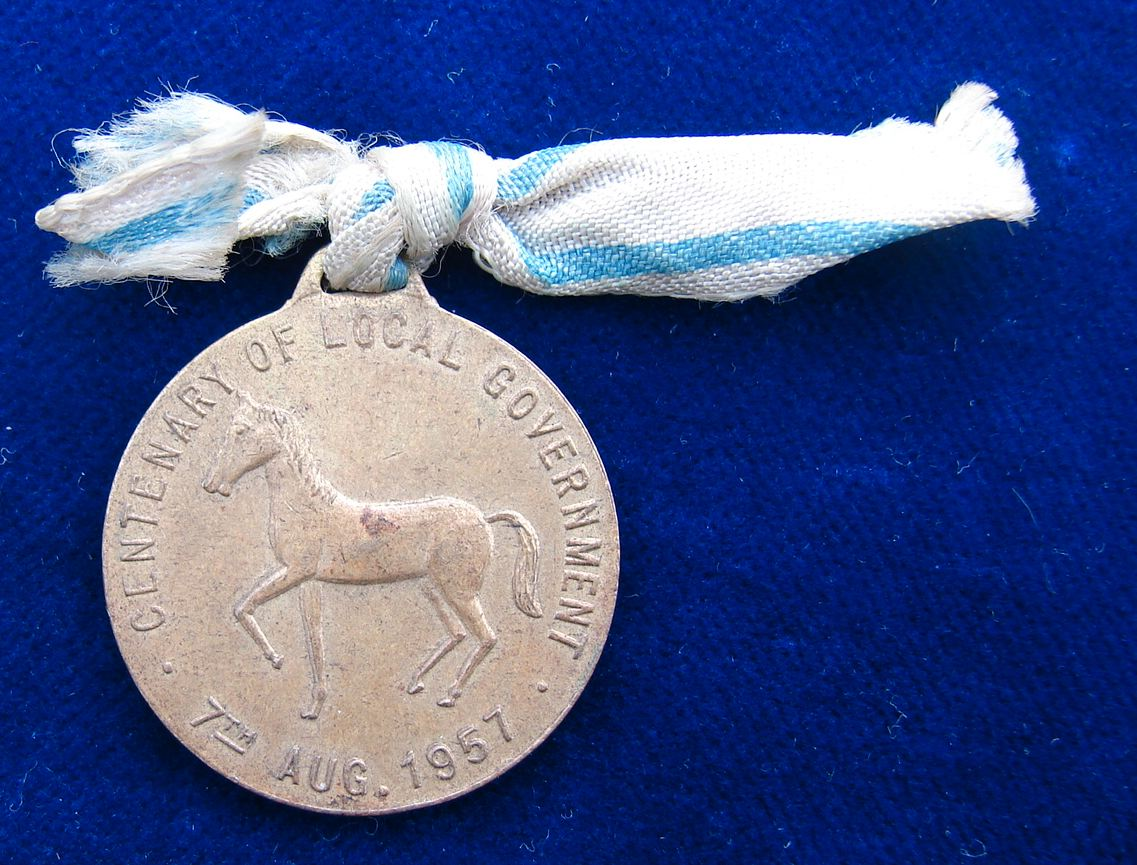
1957 Box Hill, Commemorative Medal for the Celebration of the Centenary of Local Government, obverse

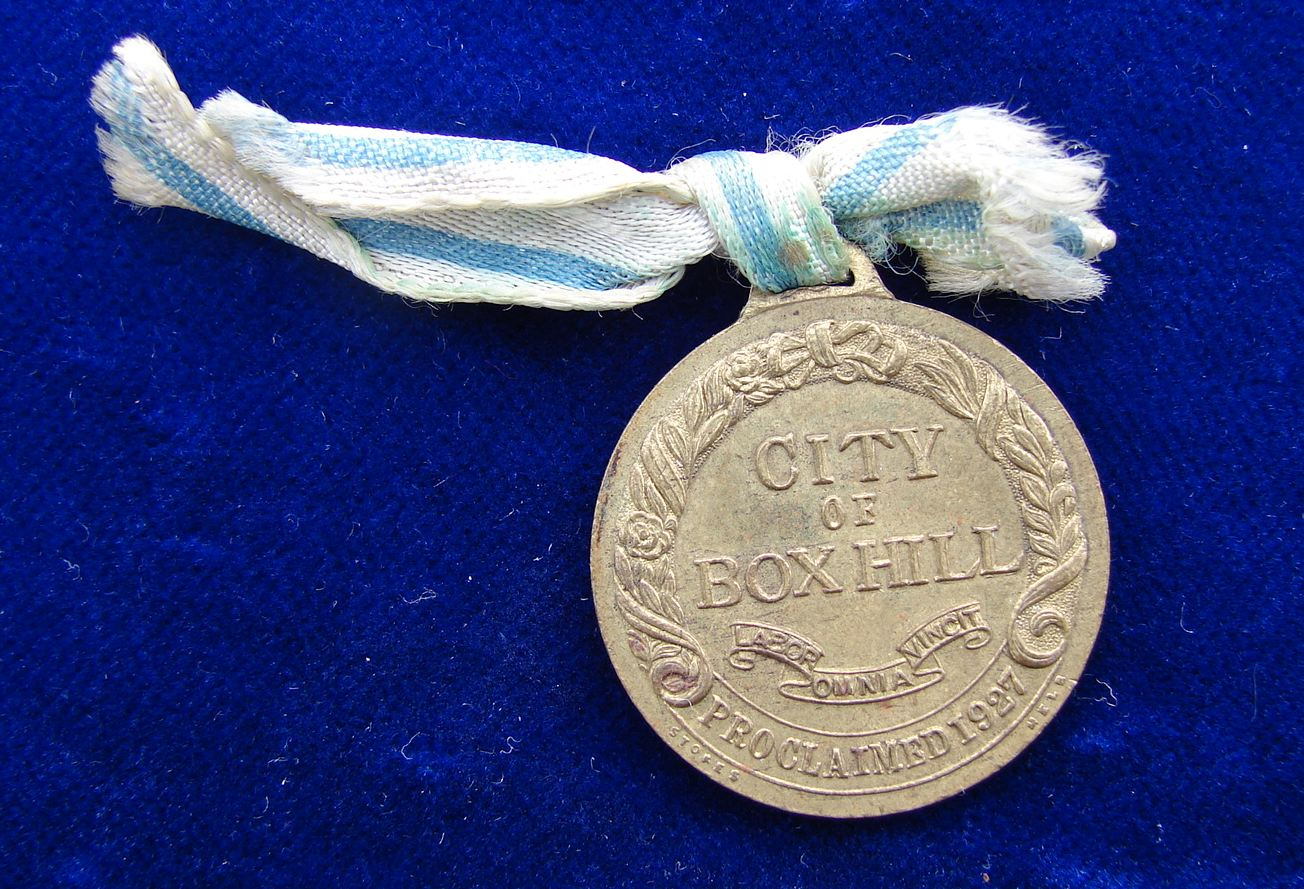
1957 Box Hill, Commemorative Medal for the Celebration of the Centenary of Local Government, reverse

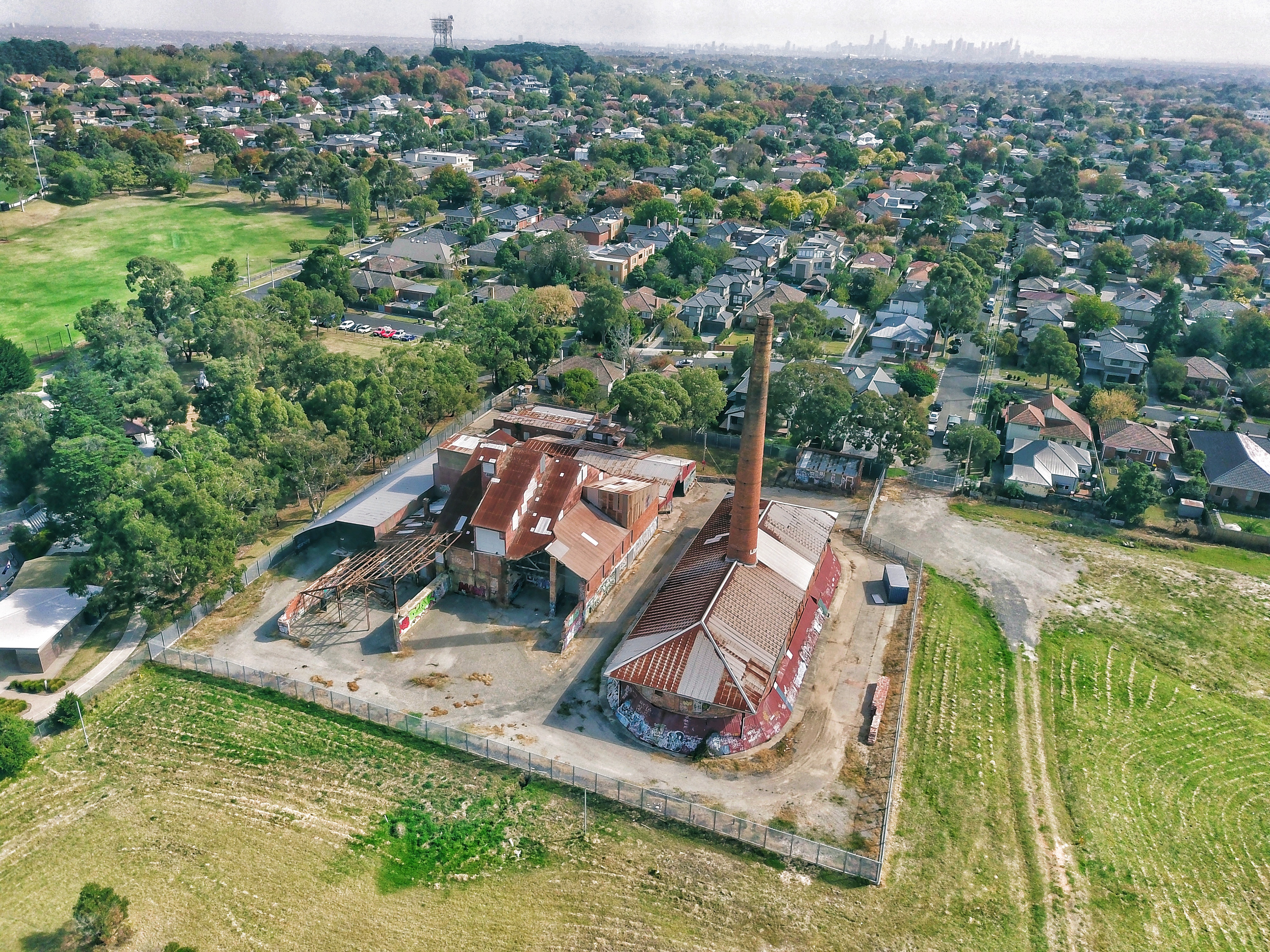
Aerial perspective of the former Standard Brickworks at Federation Street Box Hill

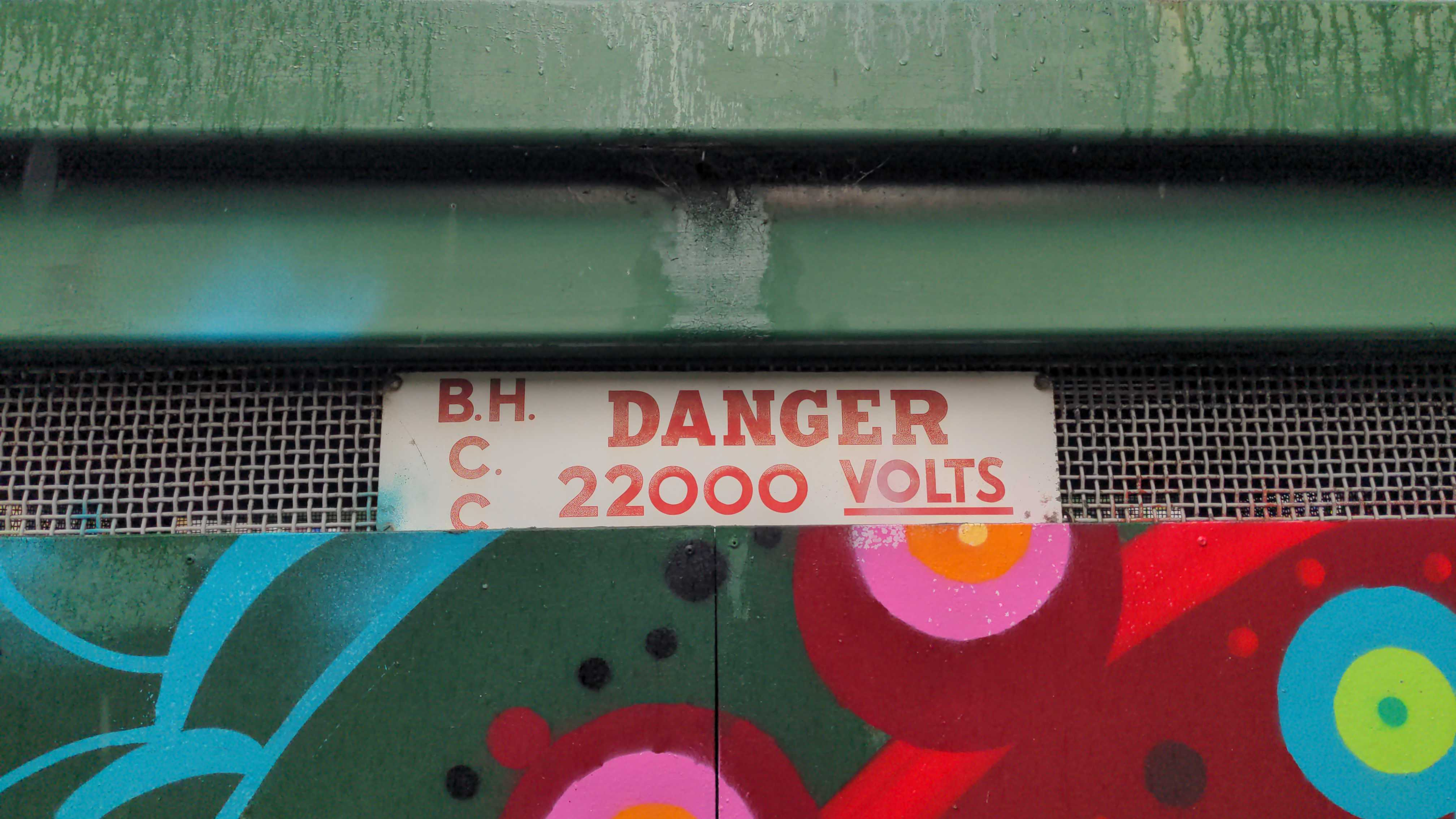
Box Hill City Council substation sign on Whitehorse Road in Box Hill.
