= Box Hill brickworks =

Former manufacturing site in Melbourne, Victoria, Australia

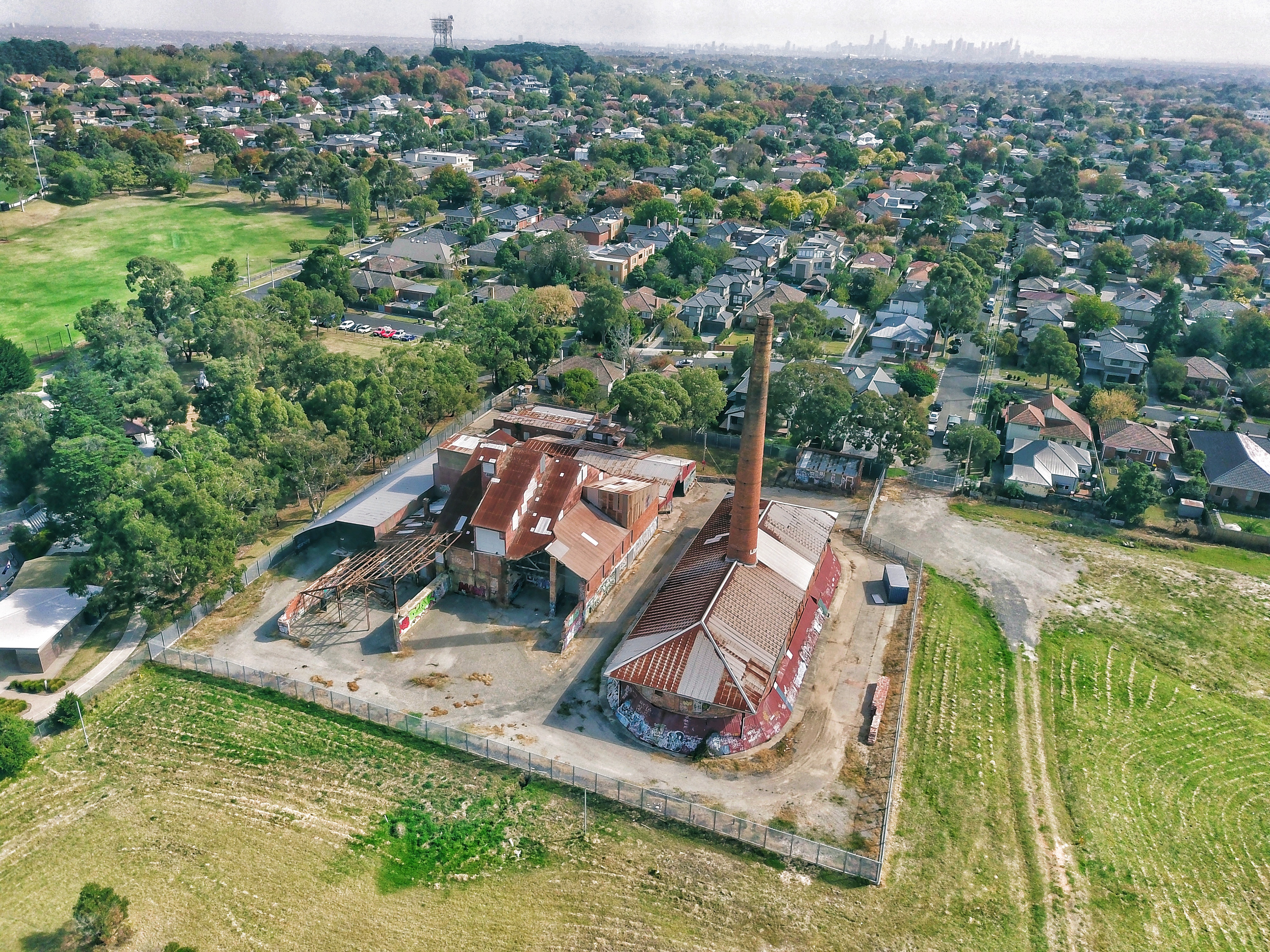
- Aerial view of the former brickworks, 2018

- Location of the former factory in Melbourne
- Built: c. 1884
- Location: 14 Federation St; Box Hill, Melbourne, Victoria, Australia
- Coordinates: 37°49′27″S 145°06′58″E
- Industry: Brickworks
- Products: Bricks; tiles; earthenware; porcelain
- Employees: c. 40
- Owners: Box Hill Brick Co. (1884–1892); Co-operative Brick Company (1892–1905); Standard Brick and Tile Co. (1911–1938); Co-operative Brick Company (1938–1966); Brick and Pipe Company (1966–1988)
- Defunct: August 1988

Site notes
- Condition: Poor; derelict; fenced
- Current use: Potential development site
- Owner: Renak Holdings
- Public access: No; gated and locked

Victorian Heritage Register
- Official name: Former Standard Brickworks
- Type: Registered place
- Designated: 20 September 1989
- Reference no.: H0720
- Heritage overlay no.: HO3
- Category: Manufacturing and Processing

The Box Hill brickworks is a former brickworks site located in Box Hill, an eastern suburb of Melbourne, in Victoria, Australia. Established c. 1884 and flourishing during the Melbourne property boom of the 1880s, the brickworks operated under various guises until 1988 when the factory was closed.

The former brickworks was added to the Victorian Heritage Register on 20 September 1989 in recognition of its historic and architectural importance.

== Description ==
The Haughton Park Brick Company was established in 1884 on 12 hectares (30 acres) in Box Hill, at the corner of Elgar and Canterbury Roads. The site served as both a quarry for clay, and the location of a manufacturing plant. Using both machinery and hand-made methods, the company produced bricks, tiles, earthenware, and porcelain. In 1886, the company changed its name to the Box Hill Brick Co Ltd., and declared its first dividend in 1890. However, the company did not pay a dividend in 1891 and in 1892 it suspended production, due to depressed economic conditions.

The Co-operative Brick Company leased the site, however, by 1905 the site was sold and the quarry became a swimming hole, called the Surrey Dive. In c. 1911 brick production again started and in 1913 the Standard Brick and Tile Co. Ltd was established. The Standard company built an 18-chamber Hoffman kiln, installed four brick presses, and employed 40 men.

The Standard company was taken over by the Co-operative Brick Company in 1938; however, the factory was closed between 1942 and 1946, due to World War II restrictions on manpower and resources. The plant was converted from gas to electricity in 1952 and, in 1966, The Brick and Pipe Company took over the company. The Box Hill brickworks were closed in August 1988.

The site retains elements of the former tramway system for hauling clay, proposed in 1918 and approved in 1921, after much community concern. Other elements visible at the site include the former blacksmith's shop, the Hoffman kiln, grinding pans and brick press machinery that were typical of industrialised brick-making in the latter half of the nineteenth century.

== Development site ==
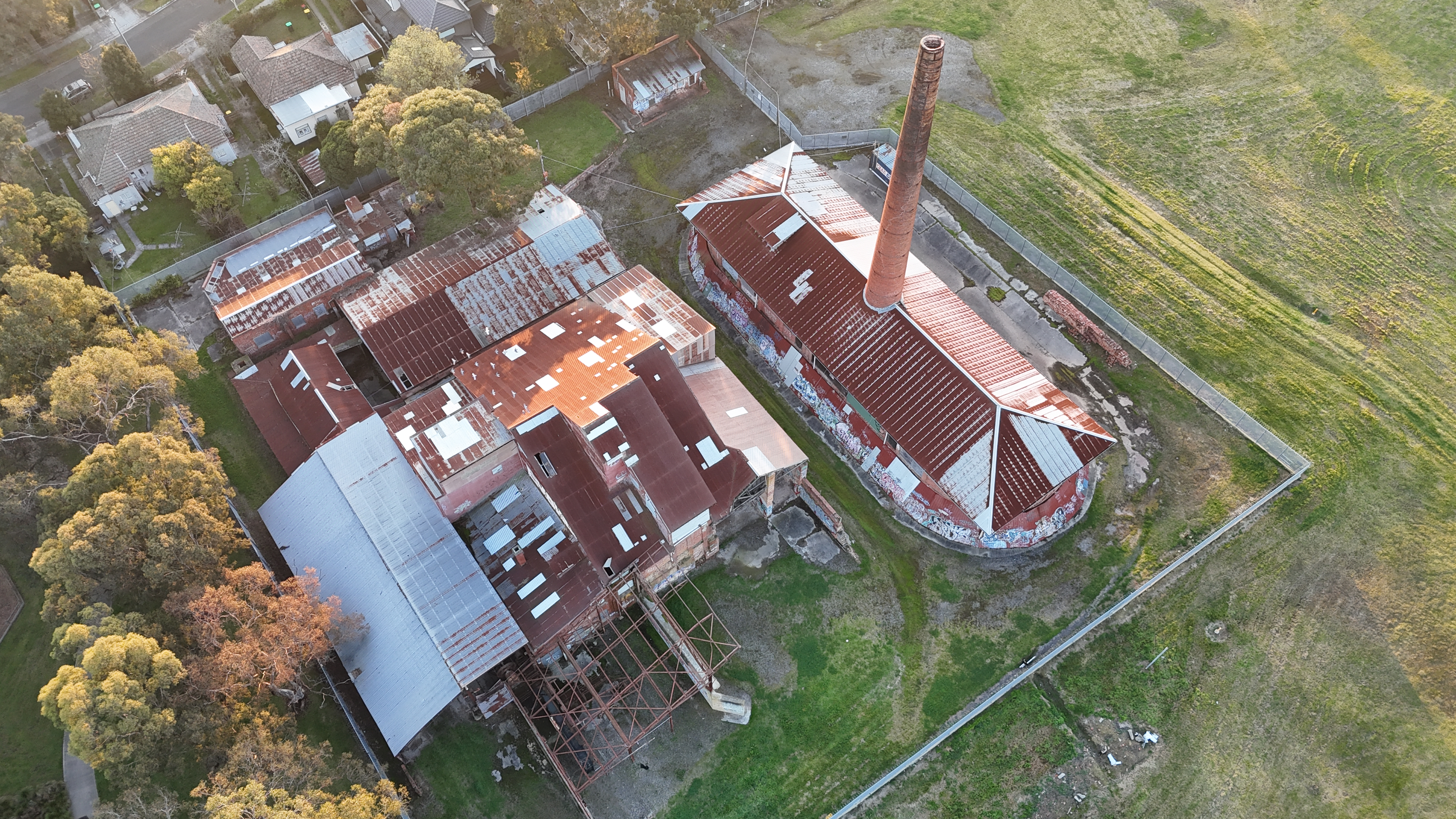
Aerial view, 2024

In 1989, the brick works and quarry were purchased for A$5 million by Azcorp Ltd, a property company. Between 1993 and 1996, the site was sold for A$4.7 million to Renak Holdings, a development company whose largest shareholder was Malaysia's Phileo Group.

Derelict and closed to the public since 1999, it was announced in 2024 that the former brickworks site and adjacent land could accommodate future high-density residential development, with multiple high-rise apartments planned as part of the Suburban Rail Loop project. In October 2025, the City of Whitehorse approved negotiations to commence with the vendor to purchase the site for community use.

== See also ==
- List of manufacturing plants in Melbourne
