= Willis Pipe Organ =

Musical organ in Melbourne, Victoria, Australia

- Location of the organ in Melbourne
- Interactive map of Willis Pipe Organ
- 37°49′18″S 145°07′21″E
- Type: Pipe organ
- Location: 8 Oxford St, Box Hill, Melbourne, Victoria, Australia
- Part of: Wesley Uniting Church

History
- Built: 1877; 149 years ago
- Built by: Henry 'Father' Willis; Henry Willis & Sons
- Built for: Henry Miller
- Original use: Findon, Kew (1877–1908); Whernside, Toorak (1908–1930)
- Rebuilt: 1930 in current location

Site notes
- Restored: 1969, 1983 and 2011
- Restored by: Hill, Norman & Beard (1969); John Parker (1983); Wakeley Pipe Organs (2011)
- Condition: Excellent
- Current use: Church use; worship
- Owner: Uniting Church in Australia, Synod of Victoria and Tasmania
- Public access: Yes
- Website: wesleyboxhill.unitingchurch.org.au

Victorian Heritage Register
- Official name: Willis Pipe Organ
- Type: Registered (item)
- Designated: 8 May 2008
- Reference no.: H2156
- Heritage overlay no.: HO77
- Category: Religion

The Willis Pipe Organ is a pipe organ located inside the Wesley Uniting Church, at 8 Oxford Street, Box Hill, an eastern suburb of Melbourne, in Victoria, Australia.

The organ was added to the Victorian Heritage Register on 8 May 2008 in recognition of its historical significance. The Victorian branch of the National Trust added to the organ to its non-statutory heritage list on 28 July 1983.

== History ==
The organ was built in 1877 by Henry 'Father' Willis for the Hon. Henry Miller MLC, installed in the ballroom of Findon, Miller's house at Kew. It was the only organ exported by Willis to Victoria and was a prestigious example of his work. The organ was depicted in an illustration in Victoria and its Metropolis (1888). No expense was spared in the construction of the organ, with superlative materials and lavish finishes being freely employed.

After 1908 it was moved to the ballroom of Whernside in Toorak, owned by Albert Miller and later Edward Miller, sons of Henry Miller, and the central pipe on the organ facade may then have been slightly cut down for a reduced ceiling height. Whernside was sold in 1928 and in 1930 the organ was installed in the Methodist Church at Box Hill, where it survives today with little alteration from the original. It was subject to maintenance and restoration in 1969, 1983, and 2011.

== Description ==
The Willis organ is an impressive instrument with a fine quality oak console, ornately decorated metal pipes, turned solid ivory and rosewood drawstops, thick ivory keys and immaculately finished internal components. After several quotes, the console was configured with two manuals, seventeen speaking stops, three couplers and has a mechanical action. The place and date of manufacture are recorded on one of the bellows ribs and the instrument has a brass plate above the keyboard bearing the builder's name. The fine Willis sound has been preserved and the casework is unaltered except for the addition of the lower left- and right-hand panels. The instrument is notable for its superlative workmanship and materials, together with its excellent sound.

=== Disposition ===
The organ has the following disposition:

GREAT			SWELL			PEDAL		
	ft	m		ft	m		ft	m
Open Diapason	8	2.4	Lieblich Bourdon	16	4.9	Bourdon Pedale	16	4.9
Claribel Flute	8	2.4	Open Diapason	8	2.4	Flute Pedale	8	2.4
Dulciana	8	2.4	Lieblich Gedact	8	2.4	Great to Pedals		
Principal	4	1.2	Salcional	8	2.4	Swell to Pedals		
Flûte Harmonique	4	1.2	Vox Angelica TC	8	2.4			
Fifteenth	2	0.61	Gemshorn	4	1.2			
Corno di Bassetto	8	2.4	Flageolet	2	0.61			
Swell to Great			Hautboy	8	2.4			

== See also ==
- List of pipe organs
- Henry Willis & Sons
