= Alan Collins (writer) =

Australian writer

Alan Alva Collins (1928–2008) was a Jewish Australian author. Collins wrote short stories, fiction, poetry, a radio play, and a memoir of his childhood in Sydney.

== Life ==
Alan Collins was one of a small group of Jewish writers of his generation who were born in Australia. He wrote extensively about the Anglo-Jewish community and his work reflects their struggles to survive in two disparate, and sometimes hostile, worlds.

Collins was unusual in that his family had been in Australia for generations. Both parents emanated from Western, rather than Eastern, European backgrounds. The Collins side deives from the Van Kollum family who were Amsterdam printers in the 17th century. One branch moved to London and, in the 1840s, Mark and Lydia Collins emigrated with their three sons to Sydney. Alan Collins was their great-great-grandson. Alva Davis was his mother and a branch of the Davis family – the Cortissos line – can be traced back to Barcelona at the time of the Spanish Inquisition in the 15th century. There is a young convict in the Davis tree, Samuel Davis, who was transported to Sydney in 1831. Both families must have moved to England in the late 18th century and would have left the London of Charles Dickens to seek a better life in Australia.

Author Judah Waten said in his introduction to Troubles (1983) (a critically acclaimed collection of 21 short stories), that "Alan Collins ... has recorded movingly, the lives of Jews without money [without being] cynical or misanthropic".

Collins's appalling childhood is described graphically in his confronting yet surprisingly funny memoir Alva's Boy. He reconstructs his early life in the Scarba Baby Home and the Ashfield Infants Home. His chaotic life as an urchin on the streets of Bondi is vividly recalled, as is the description of the social life of working-class Jews at the end of the Great Depression and the beginning of World War II.

The novel The Boys from Bondi is based on his time in the Isabella Lazarus Home. It is here that the meeting of the two Jewish cultures – the 'reffos' and the 'anglos' – is so graphically described. When he was 14, Alan was sent out into the world as an apprentice printer, living on lowly wages in crude rooming houses – and worse followed when he left to work in what he succinctly described as the 'inferno' of a glass factory.

He had a talent for writing and, after working at Nock and Kirby (a hardware store) in their advertising department, he joined the Sydney Sun as a young reporter and later became editor of the Sydney Jewish News. He gave himself an education by reading in public libraries and through second-hand books.

In 1953, he left Sydney for Melbourne, where he became advertising manager for Rockmans Stores. Like many young Australians in the 1950s, he travelled overseas. He met and married Rosaline Fox in London in 1957 and they returned to Melbourne where he resumed work at Rockmans. Home was a rented flat in the beach-side suburb Elwood, where their eldest son, Daniel, was born. With the dream of having a real home for the first time in his life, he took the family to the raw outer-Melbourne suburb of Box Hill, where his sons Peter and Toby were born, and where he and Ros later fostered a young boy named John from a war-torn background.

Collins worked in advertising agencies as a copywriter and then formed his own business, Collins Advertising, in a home-made office he built in his garden. In the short story The Value of a Nail (Meanjin, 1984), Collins eulogised that great Australian institution the hardware store, and in real life he gained creative pleasure from woodworking, establishing the 'Toby Toys' range for preschool children.

He wrote articles and short stories for magazines and newspapers, many of which are published in anthologies, and a radio play called Shabbatai!, which is an irreverent take on a bizarre character in Jewish history.

A prize-winning short story, The Balconies, provided the impetus for The Boys from Bondi, published by the University of Queensland Press in 1987. But readers wanted to know what happened next. The sequel, Going Home, was published in 1993, and Joshua (1995) completed the trilogy.

The three titles were published in 2001 as the single-volume A Promised Land? The book was described as one of the significant family sagas of Australian youth. Collins chose the title to reflect the complex feelings his central characters have towards Australia and Israel.

The sea, beach and sun were always the restorative elements in his life. As a neglected child, the beach had been his haven from the often confusing world around him. In Melbourne, he and Ros returned to Elwood for their last 20 years together with their family and another of his great pleasures, sailing.

In 1999, they became members of the newly formed Kehilat Nitzan congregation, founded on the egalitarian principles of Conservative Judaism (Masorti). He also became an enthusiastic student at the Florence Melton Adult Education School, where he attended courses in Jewish history, philosophy, literature, and culture. He considered himself a secular Jew but also wrote:

Am I a Jewish fiction writer or a writer of Jewish fiction? They are, for me, one and indivisible – without my sense of Jewish history, I would not be a writer... I believe, too, that my writing....has its genesis in our Australian ethos; it would be most peculiar if it did not... It is the Australian–Jewish environment that takes priority and provides the parameters for my work...

Collins is outlived by his wife Ros; sons Daniel, Peter and Toby; daughter-in-law Rhonda; grandsons Joshua, Eli and Isaac; and foster son John.

== Selected works ==
- Troubles: 21 short stories
- The Boys from Bondi
- Jacob's ladder (US edition of The Boys from Bondi)
- Going home
- Joshua
- A Promised land?
- Alva's boy: an unsentimental memoir

== Bibliography ==
- Levi, John S. These are the names: Jewish lives in Australia, 1788–1850, (Melbourne University Press, Carlton, 2006)
- Levi, John S. and G. F. J. Bergman. Australian Genesis: Jewish convicts and settlers 1788–1860 (Melbourne University Press, Carlton, 2002)
