= Woodhouse Grove Wesleyan Chapel =

Former Uniting church in Melbourne, Victoria, Australia

Woodhouse Grove Uniting Church
- Location of the church in Greater Metropolitan Melbourne
- Woodhouse Grove Uniting Church
- 37°48′08″S 145°07′56″E
- Location: 147 Woodhouse Grove, Box Hill, Melbourne, Victoria
- Country: Australia
- Denomination: Uniting (1977—2022)
- Previous denomination: Wesleyan (1856—1902); Methodist (1902—1977)
- Website: manninghamuc.org

History
- Status: Closed (in 2022)
- Consecrated: Good Friday 1856 or 1857

Architecture
- Functional status: Chapel (closed)
- Architectural type: Church
- Style: Victorian Georgian
- Years built: 1855-1856
- Completed: 1856
- Closed: 2022

Specifications
- Materials: Stone; brick; tiles

Administration
- Division: Synod of Victoria and Tasmania
- District: Presbytery of Yarra Yarra
- Parish: Manningham Uniting Church

Victorian Heritage Register
- Official name: Woodhouse Grove Wesleyan Chapel
- Type: Registered place
- Designated: 19 December 2002
- Reference no.: H2010
- Heritage overlay no.: HO99
- Category: Religion

The Woodhouse Grove Wesleyan Chapel, also known as the Woodhouse Grove Uniting Church, is a Uniting former church building, located in Box Hill, an eastern suburb of Melbourne, Victoria, Australia.

Located on the traditional lands of the Wurundjeri, the former church was added to the Victorian Heritage Register on 19 December 2002 in recognition of its architectural, aesthetic, and historical significance. The Victorian branch of the National Trust added the former church to its non-statutory list of heritage properties on 23 November 1961.

== Administration ==
In c. 2015, the Manningham Uniting Church was formed through the merger of The Woodhouse Grove at Box Hill, together with nearby Uniting churches at Doncaster East, Doncaster, and Templestowe. Whilst, in 2019, the Uniting Church retained the Woodhouse Grove church property, it was repurposed for limited use as a church with the remainder of the site set aside for residential housing. In November 2022, the Heritage Council of Victoria conditionally approved proposed modifications to the church property.

The last church service at the historical church was on 26 June 2022.

Prior to its closure, The Woodhouse Grove Uniting Church was part of the Manningham Uniting Church, a parish within the Presbytery of Yarra Yarra, in the Synod of Victoria and Tasmania.

== Description ==
The former Woodhouse Grove Wesleyan Chapel was constructed between 1855 and 1856 in the Victorian Georgian style using local Koonung Creek stone and bricks. It was one of the first church buildings to be built in the area, and the oldest surviving church building in the City of Whitehorse. The first service in the chapel was on Good Friday in either 1856 or 1857.

The chapel is a small rectangular building of coursed freestone with stone quoining at the corners. It has round-arched timber framed windows with cream brick surrounds and keystones. It is a simple single roomed building with a porch. The chapel is a remnant of the original small, once rural towns that grew up around Melbourne in the nineteenth century and has undergone little alteration on the exterior or interior.

== See also ==
- Architecture of Melbourne
- Australian non-residential architectural styles
- List of Uniting churches in Melbourne
