= City of Nunawading =

Coordinates: 37°49′S 145°11′E

City of Nunawading Victoria
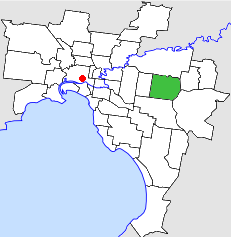
- Location in Melbourne
- The extent of the City of Nunawading at its dissolution in 1994
- Population: 96,600 (1992)
  - Density: 2,321.6/km^{2} (6,013/sq mi)
- Established: 1925
- Area: 41.61 km^{2} (16.1 sq mi)
- Council seat: Nunawading
- Region: Eastern Melbourne
- County: Bourke
LGAs around City of Nunawading:
Doncaster & Templestowe	Doncaster & Templestowe	Ringwood
Box Hill	City of Nunawading	Knox
Waverley	Waverley	Knox

The City of Nunawading was a local government area about 20 kilometres (12 mi) east of Melbourne, the state capital of Victoria, Australia. The city covered an area of 41.61 square kilometres (16.07 sq mi), and existed from 1925 until 1994.

== History ==
Nunawading was originally part of the Nunawading Road District, which was incorporated on 7 August 1857. The district was renamed the Shire of Nunawading on 4 May 1872. On 26 May 1925, the Shire of Blackburn and Mitcham (sometimes referred to as Blackburn-Mitcham) came into being, when the eastern two-thirds of the district seceded; the western part went on to become the City of Box Hill. The shire was proclaimed as the City of Nunawading on 30 May 1945.

On 15 December 1994, the City of Nunawading was abolished, and along with the City of Box Hill, was merged into the newly created City of Whitehorse.

Council meetings were held at the Nunawading Town Hall, on Whitehorse Road, Nunawading. It is used today for the same purpose by the City of Whitehorse.

Cr Noel Spurr OAM was elected the last Mayor of Nunawading, and in 1997 was elected to the inaugural Whitehorse City Council.

== Wards ==
The City of Nunawading was subdivided into four wards, each electing three councillors. The wards were divided from each other by Canterbury Road and Springvale Road:

- North West Ward
- North East Ward
- South West Ward
- South East Ward

As the Shire of Blackburn and Mitcham, it also had several wards, including Blackburn Ward.

== Suburbs ==
- Blackburn
- Blackburn North
- Blackburn South
- Burwood East
- Forest Hill
- Mitcham (shared with the City of Doncaster & Templestowe)
- Nunawading*
- Vermont
- Vermont South

* Council seat.

== Population ==
Year	Population
1933	7,131
1954	23,855
1958	38,600*
1961	53,246
1966	74,554
1971	90,702
1976	94,325
1981	97,052
1986	93,482
1991	91,468

* Estimate in the 1958 Victorian Year Book.
