= Box Hill, Victoria =

Box Hill
- Suburb
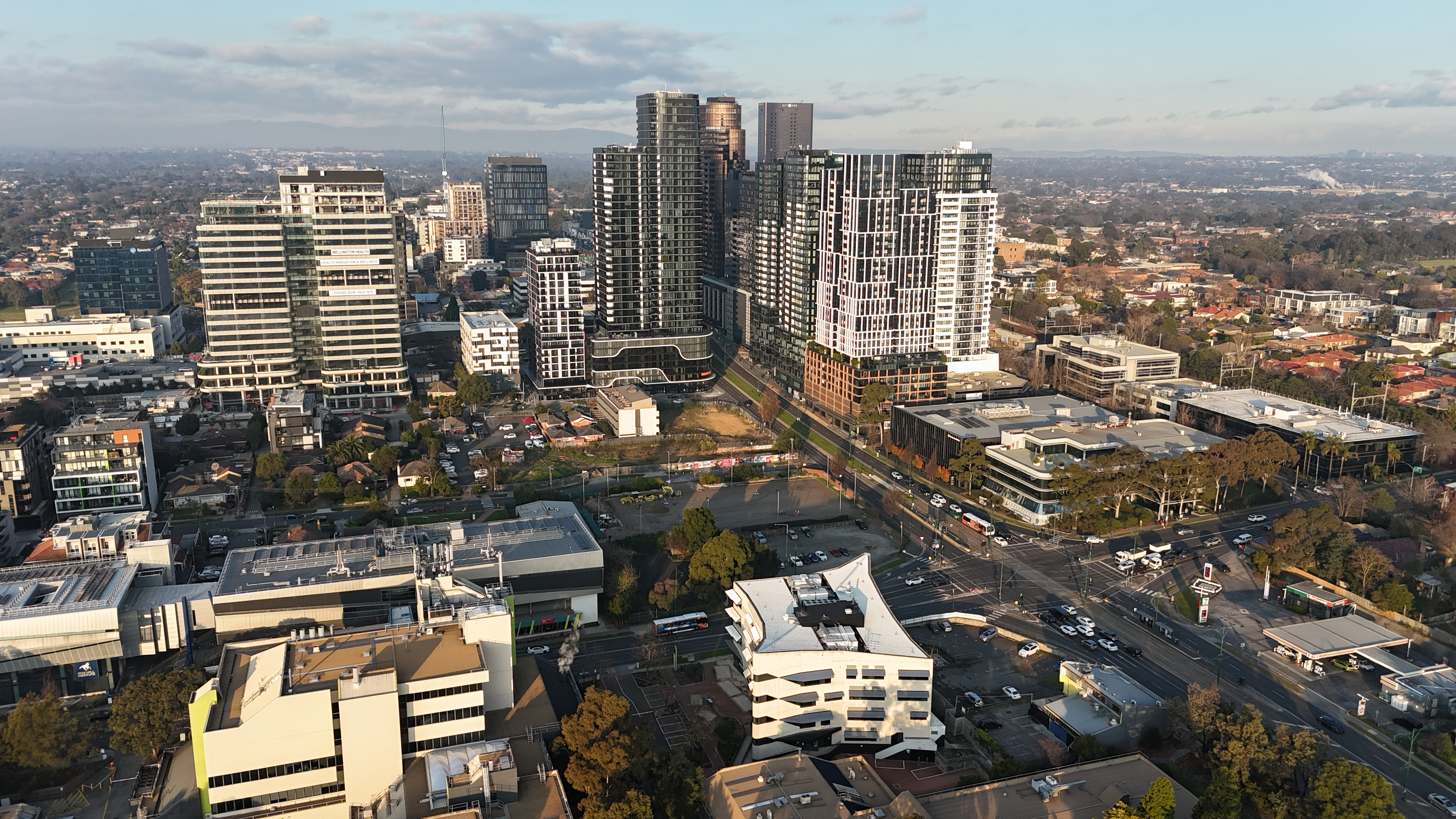
- Aerial view of Box Hill's CBD looking east in 2024

- Interactive map of Box Hill
- Coordinates: 37.8215°S 145.126°E
- Country: Australia
- State: Victoria
- City: Melbourne
- LGA: City of Whitehorse
- Location: 14 km (8.7 mi) from Melbourne

Government
  - State electorate: Box Hill
  - Federal division: Menzies

Area
  - Total: 3.5 km^{2} (1.4 sq mi)

Population
  - Total: 14,353 (2021 census)
  - Density: 4,100/km^{2} (10,620/sq mi)
- Postcode: 3128
Suburbs around Box Hill
Mont Albert North	Box Hill North	Blackburn North
Mont Albert	Box Hill	Blackburn
Surrey Hills	Box Hill South	Blackburn South

Box Hill is an eastern suburb of Melbourne, Victoria, Australia, 14 kilometres (8.7 mi) east of the city's Central Business District (CBD), located within the City of Whitehorse local government area. Box Hill recorded a population of 14,353 at the 2021 census.

Founded as a township in the 1850s, Box Hill has grown over the following century into a small city with its own central business district (CBD). It formed the centre of the former local government of the City of Box Hill which had its own suburbs, including Box Hill North and Box Hill South. In the 1950s, Box Hill was absorbed into Melbourne as part of its eastward expansion.

Today, Box Hill is notable for its large Chinese community, having the largest percentage of individuals of Chinese heritage in Australia (the 2021 census recorded 46.6% of the suburb's residents as having Chinese ancestry), and is home to Melbourne's tallest high-rise buildings outside its CBD.

A major transport hub for Melbourne's eastern suburbs, Box Hill is home to one of the city's busiest train stations, located beneath Box Hill Central. It is also served by the route 109 tram and numerous bus routes.

== History ==
=== Pre-European settlement ===
The Wurundjeri Woiwurrung people lived in the area now called Box Hill for many thousands of years. They used the many creeks in the area as a source of food and water, including Bushy Creek in the north.

=== 19th century ===
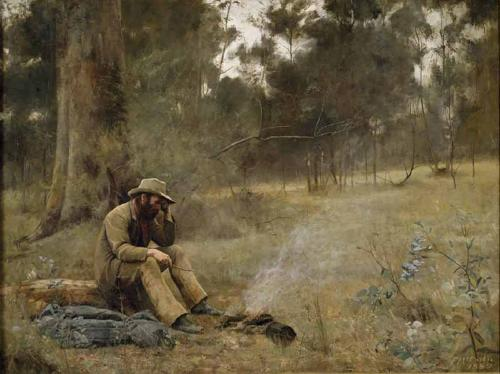
Frederick McCubbin's Down on His Luck, painted in Box Hill in 1889. He and other Australian impressionists founded the Box Hill artists' camp.

Box Hill was first settled by the squatter Arundel Wrighte, formerly of Van Diemen's Land, who, in 1838 took up a pastoral lease on the land he had previously explored in the Bushy Creek area. The first permanent settlers, Thomas Toogood and his wife Edith, purchased 5,000 acres (20 km^{2}) in 1841 and Wrighte built a house on his property, "Marionvale", in 1844. The Pioneers' Memorial, which can be found in front of the town hall, is made from a chimney stone, taken from Wrighte's original house. It was not until after 1850, however, that Crown lands were subdivided and sold. Traffic along a main road running through the district encouraged the building of a hotel at Box Hill in 1853. Its owner named it the White Horse hotel and the name was bestowed on the road. Box Hill Post Office opened on 1 February 1861, being the first official use of the name. The postmaster, Silas Padgham proposed the name, derived from Box Hill, Surrey, England, near his birthplace.

In 1871, Box Hill township's population was 154 and the district relied on orchards, vineyards and mixed farming. The extension of the railway line from Camberwell to Lilydale in 1882 included a station at Box Hill, but there were also stations at Canterbury and Surrey Hills, to the west. They attracted subdivisions and development ahead of Box Hill. Growth came, though, with a school opening in Box Hill in 1887, then known as State School 2838. The town became the seat of the Nunawading Shire Council, which met at the Box Hill Courthouse.

In the mid-1880s, Box Hill became a favoured area for landscape artists who wanted to paint the Australian bush en plein air. These artists, among them Arthur Streeton, Tom Roberts and Frederick McCubbin, established the Box Hill artists' camp, and formed what would become known as the Heidelberg School, the first distinctively Australian movement in Western art.

=== 20th century ===
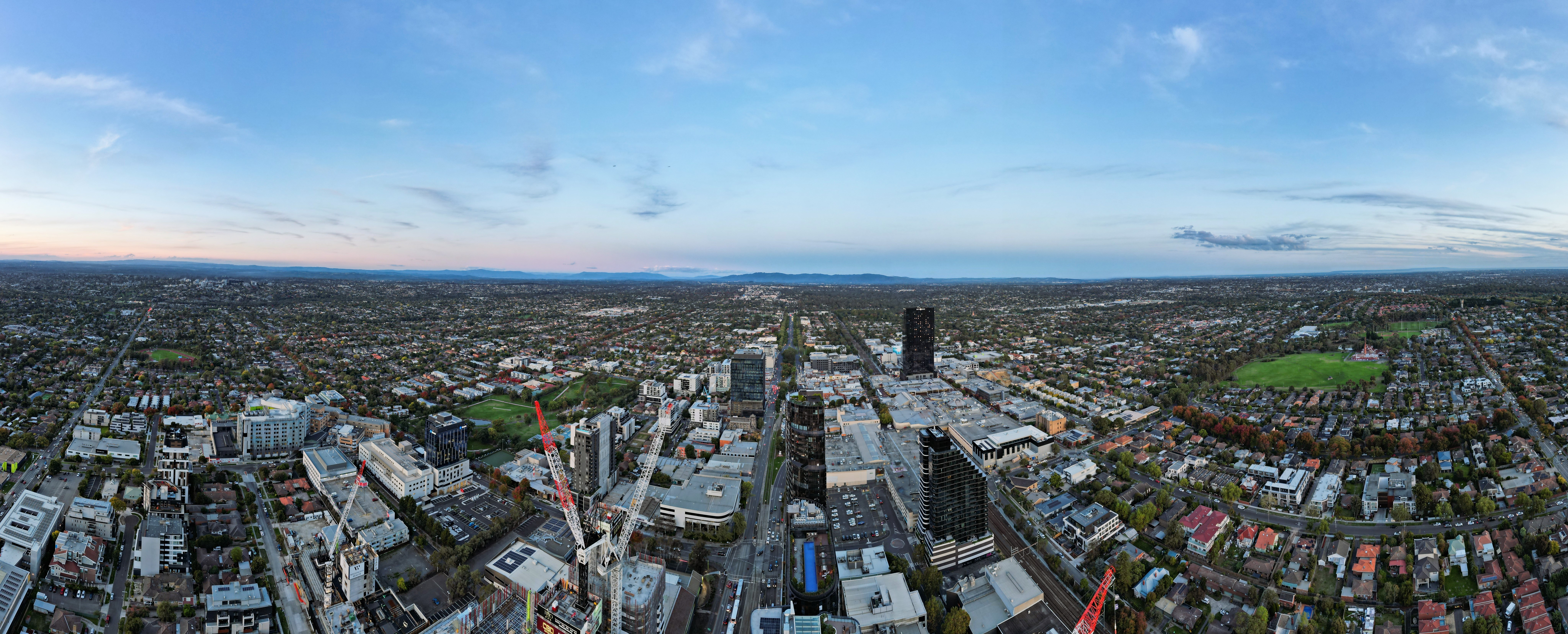
Aerial panorama of Box Hill facing east towards the Dandenong Ranges, April 2023

Unlike suburbs closer to Melbourne, Box Hill lacked the web of tramlines, which promoted residential development beyond the reach of the railway line. In 1916–17, tramlines reached the western edge of what in a short time would be the Box Hill Municipality, at Burwood, Mont Albert and Wattle Park. The years after World War I saw Box Hill's turn for residential growth. A girls' technical school was built in 1924 and a boys' high school in 1930. During World War II a boys' technical school was opened.

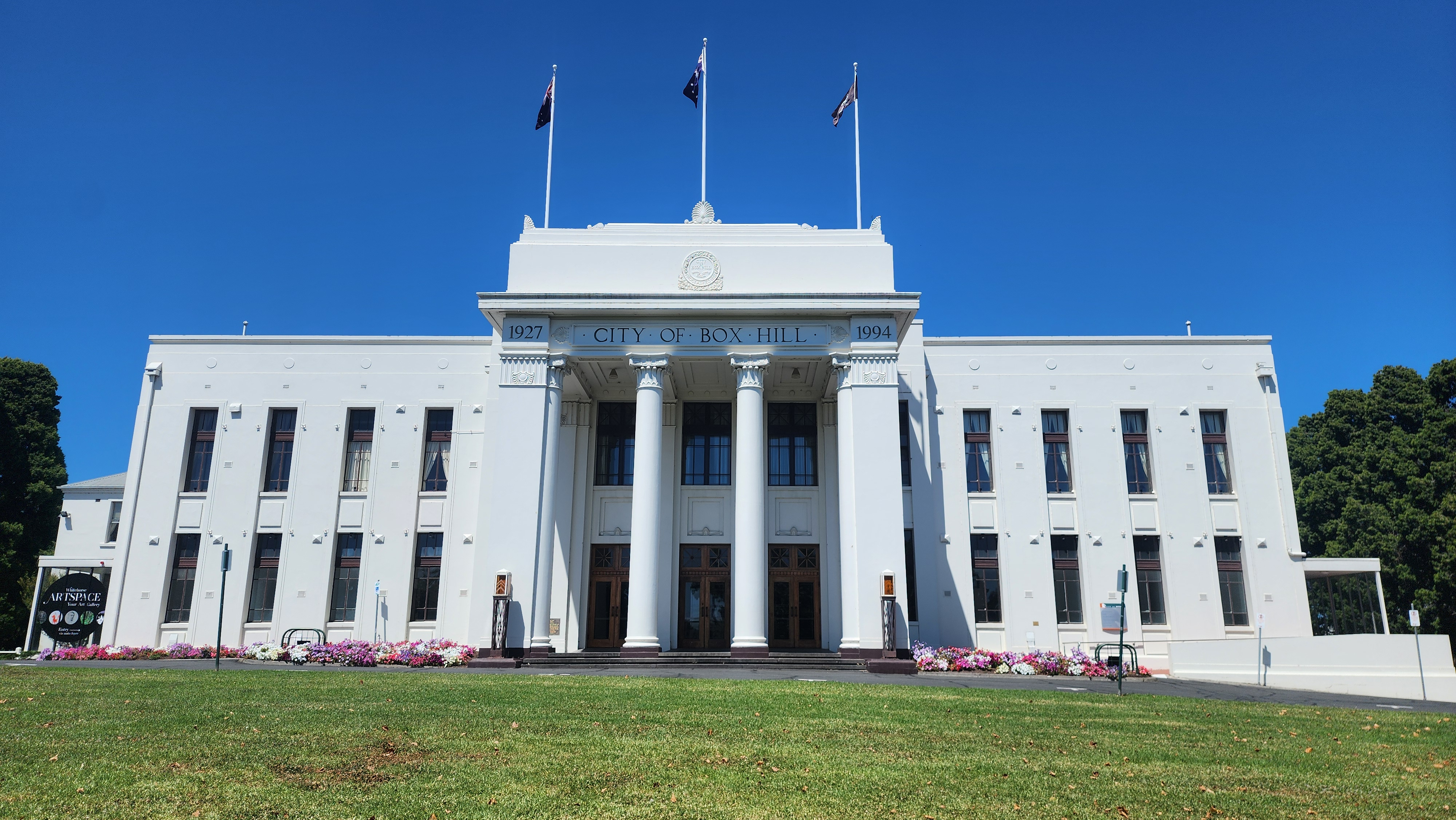
Box Hill Town Hall

The new town hall on Whitehorse Road opened in April 1935. One of the arguments for its construction was that "the boon it would prove to the local brickworks, which had just resumed production after a period of suspension".

The Box Hill Presbyterian (now Uniting) Church building was originally the West Melbourne Presbyterian Church built 1867 on the corner of Lonsdale and William Streets; a final service was held on 3 February 1935, following which the building was dismantled and re-erected on its present site, being opened in late 1935.

After the end of the Second World War, Box Hill was suburbanised, but Box Hill South and Box Hill North remained comparatively undeveloped.

==== Post-war development ====
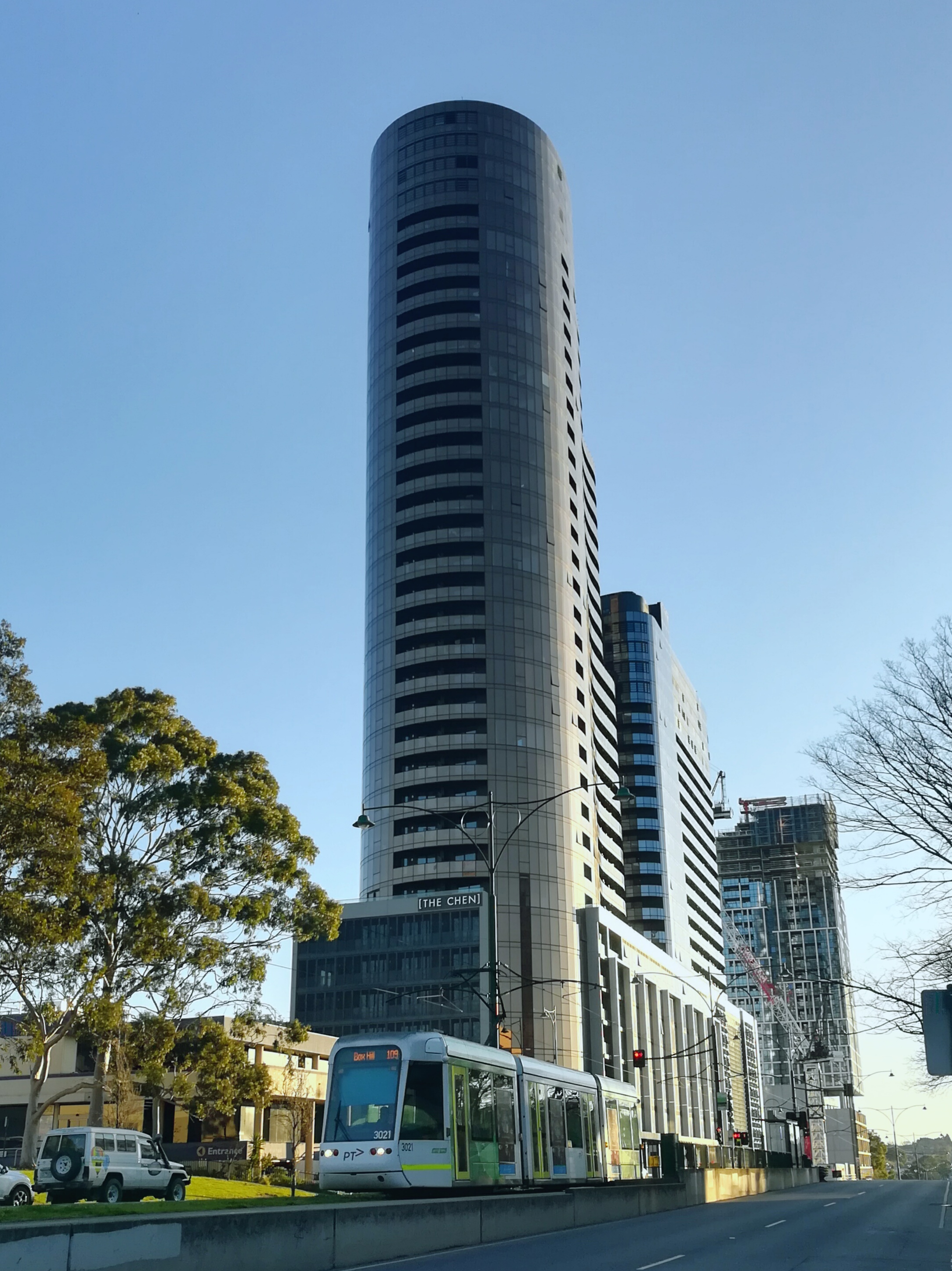
High-rise buildings with a tram in the foreground

Post-war housing expansion included a Housing Commission estate in Box Hill South. A district hospital opened in 1956. The shopping area enjoyed growth and prosperity which placed a significant strain upon its parking infrastructure by the end of the 1950s.

In 1954, the Melbourne & Metropolitan Board of Works designated Box Hill as one of five district centres for metropolitan Melbourne. In addition to the shopping centre, the Box Hill TAFE and several office buildings have strengthened its centrality in the region. Apart from commercial functions there are large reserves, with ovals in three directions, about a kilometre from Box Hill Central. Box Hill South lies between Canterbury Road and Burwood East, about two kilometres square. Its proximity to trams was better than Box Hill North's and its residential growth was substantially pre- and early post-war. The Box Hill Golf Club is nearby and a linear park continues along Gardiners Creek. There have also been church-run or affiliated educational institutions, such as Kingswood College, Christian Brothers' Teachers' College and St. Leo's College (1952 and 1957).

In 1971, a sister city relationship was forged with Matsudo, Chiba Prefecture, Japan. "Box Hill" is the name of a department store in Matsudo (ja:ボックスヒル).

Box Hill City was amalgamated with Nunawading City on 15 December 1994, to form Whitehorse City, renewing the boundaries that began with the Nunawading Parish and subsequent Shire.

=== 21st century ===
More recently, Box Hill has experienced a construction boom, and is now home to high-rise buildings. These include the Australian Taxation Office's Box Hill Tower, the Whitehorse Towers and the 36-storey Sky One, standing at 122 metres tall, which is the tallest building outside central Melbourne. More high-rises are under construction, including New Chinatown, a $450 million twin tower project which will serve as a modern "sibling" of the historic Chinatown in the CBD, with this development to consist of 10,000 square metres of mixed-purpose storefronts over three levels, a 4000-square-metre “Hawker Hall” containing street-style food stalls, a 1500-square-metre childcare centre, a Chinese language school and bookshop, Chinese herbalists, and a handful of Chinese and Western medicine clinics.

== Geography ==
=== Urban structure ===
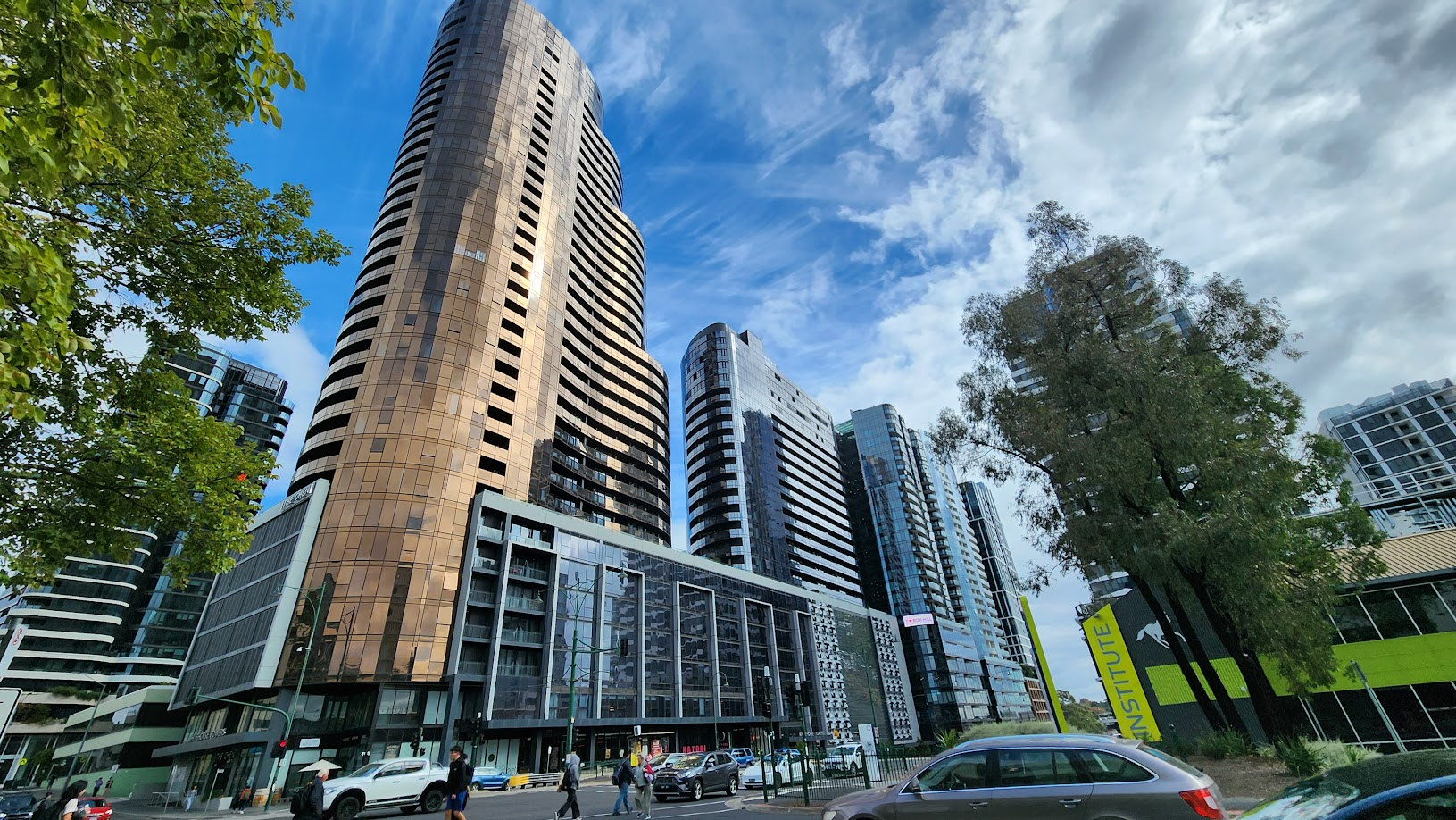
High-rise buildings in Box Hill's core

Box Hill has a large central core that serves as one of the largest metropolitan centres outside of the Melbourne central business district. It has been a designated major centre in state and local planning documents since 1954, designed to serve as the main retail and commercial hub of Melbourne's eastern suburbs.

Box Hill railway station forms the core of the central area. Taller residential and commercial buildings are clustered around this area which is surrounded on three sides by major roads. Through 2015 to the present, new taller residential buildings have been constructed on the north side of Whitehorse Road adjacent to Box Hill Gardens, including state and Commonwealth government offices.

=== Landmarks ===
Box Hill has a large shopping district, primarily concentrated along Station Street and Whitehorse Road and the two Box Hill Central shopping centres. Other smaller centres are located on Whitehorse Road near Middleborough Road and Station Street near Canterbury Road. In late 2007, the two shopping centres merged as a part of a large-scale redevelopment project of the precincts. They are now known as buildings "South" (Formerly Central Box Hill) and "North" (formerly Central Whitehorse,) or "Box Hill Central", which further hosts the Box Hill Railway Station, and a bus interchange.

The Box Hill Hospital serves surrounding suburbs together with Epworth Eastern, a private hospital, which opened in 2005 in the same precinct. The Box Hill Library, part of the Whitehorse Manningham Regional Library Corporation, is a local government-funded library located near Box Hill Town Hall.

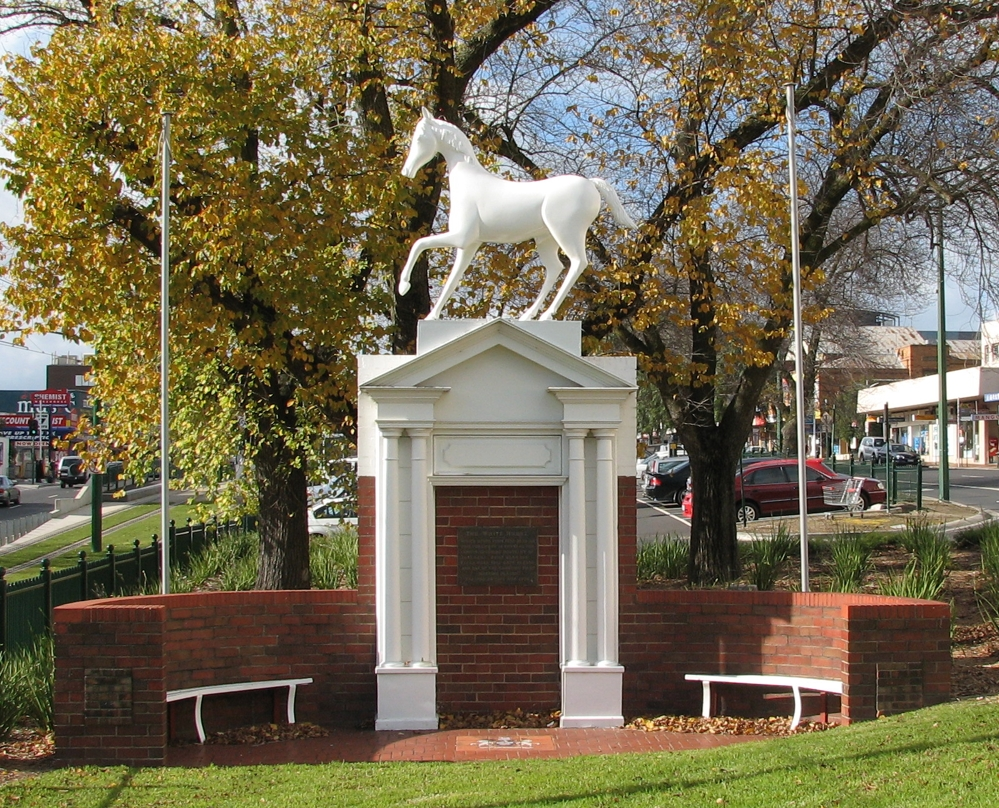
The White Horse, Whitehorse Road, Box Hill

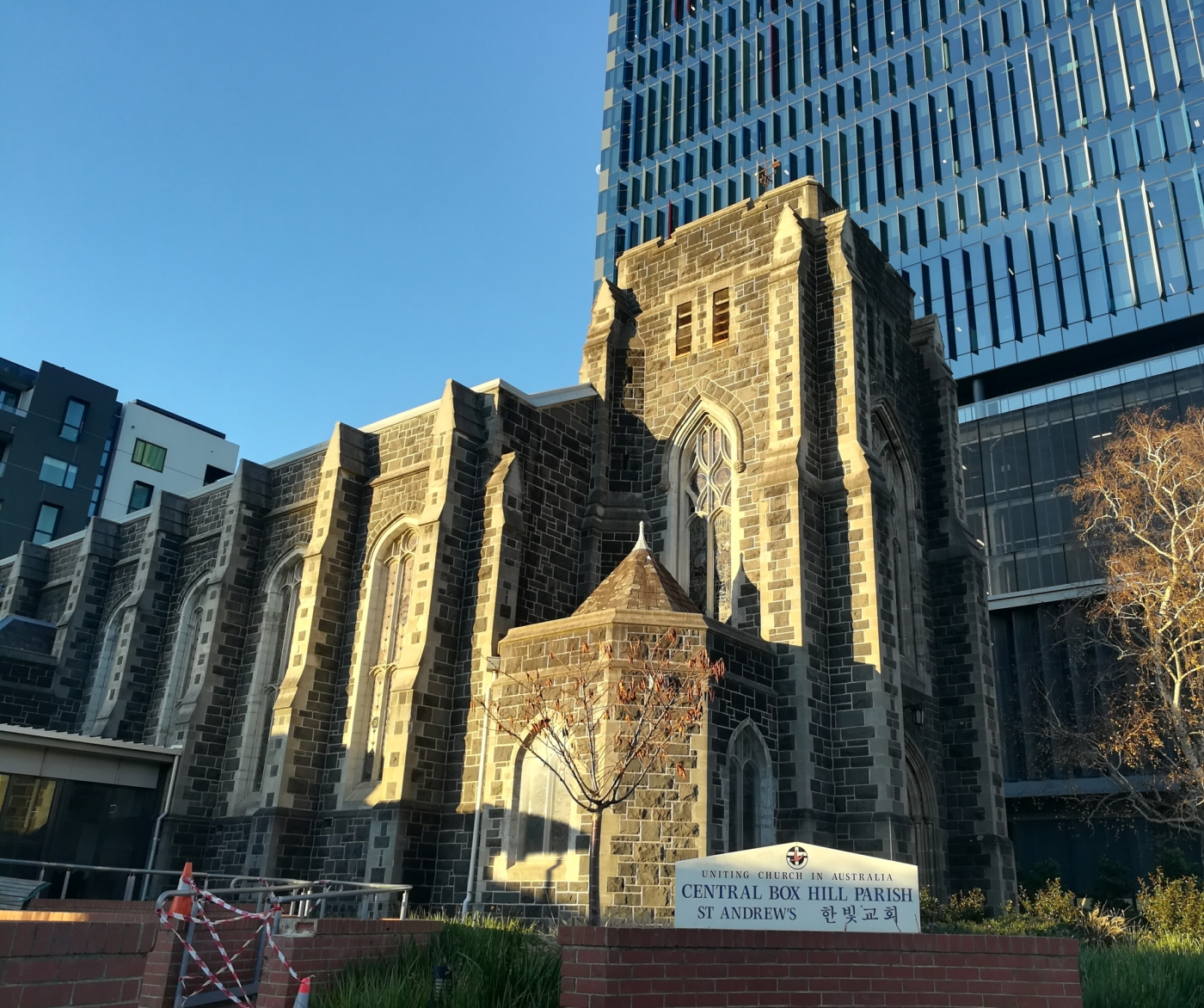
St Andrew's Uniting Church

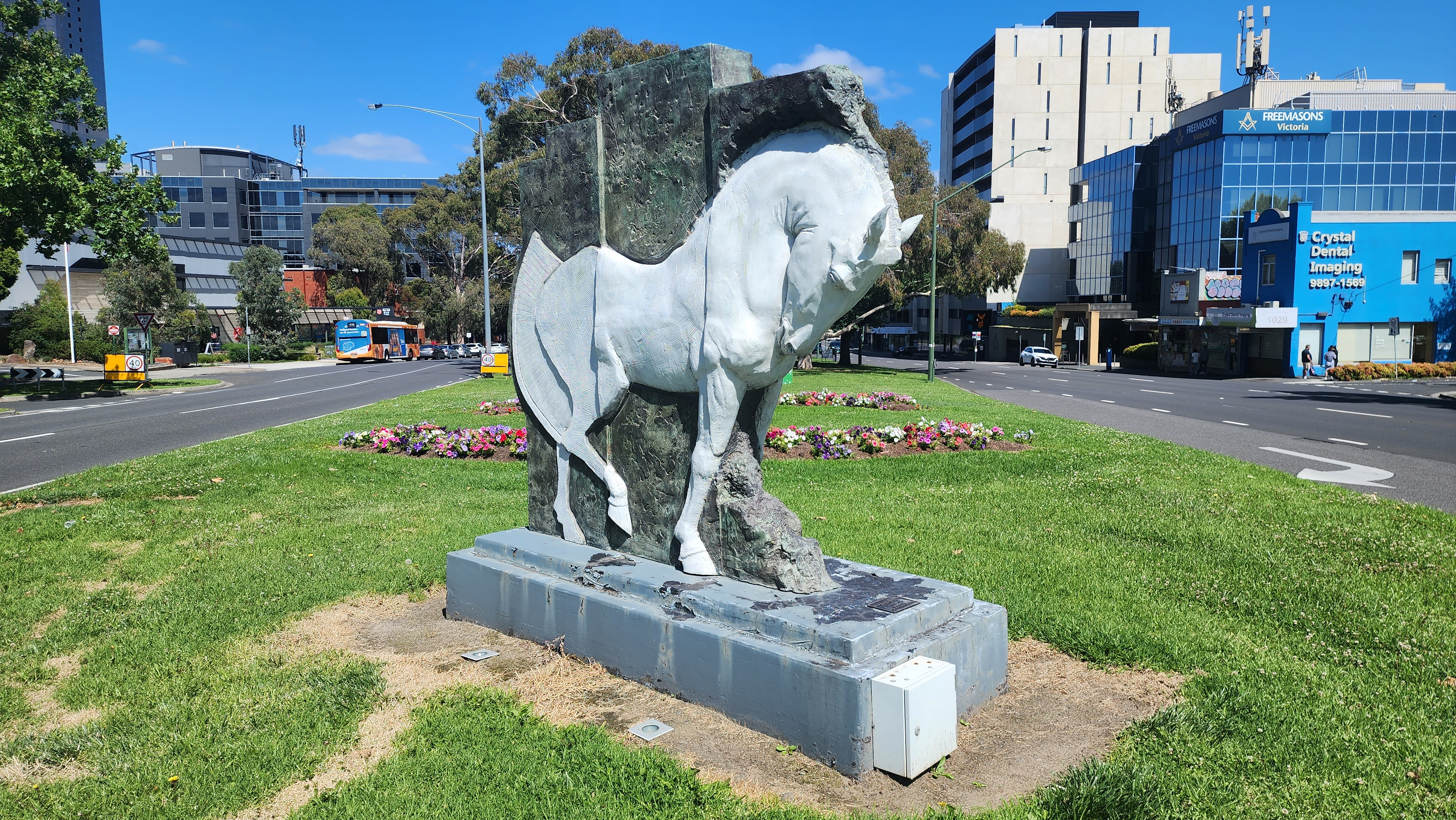
Unity 1998-99 by Stephen Glassborow (1999)-Whitehorse Road view

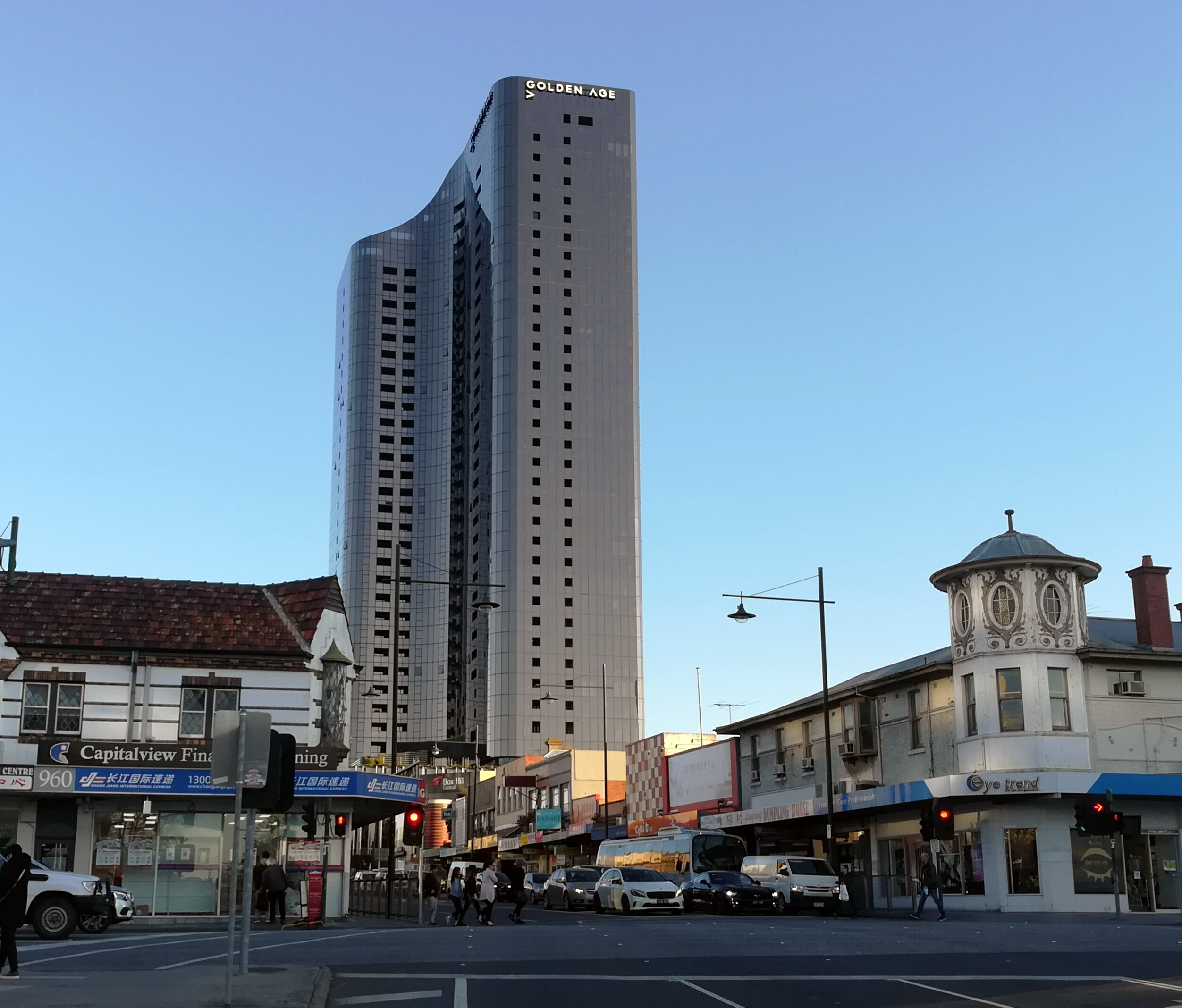
Station Street looking south at Whitehorse Road

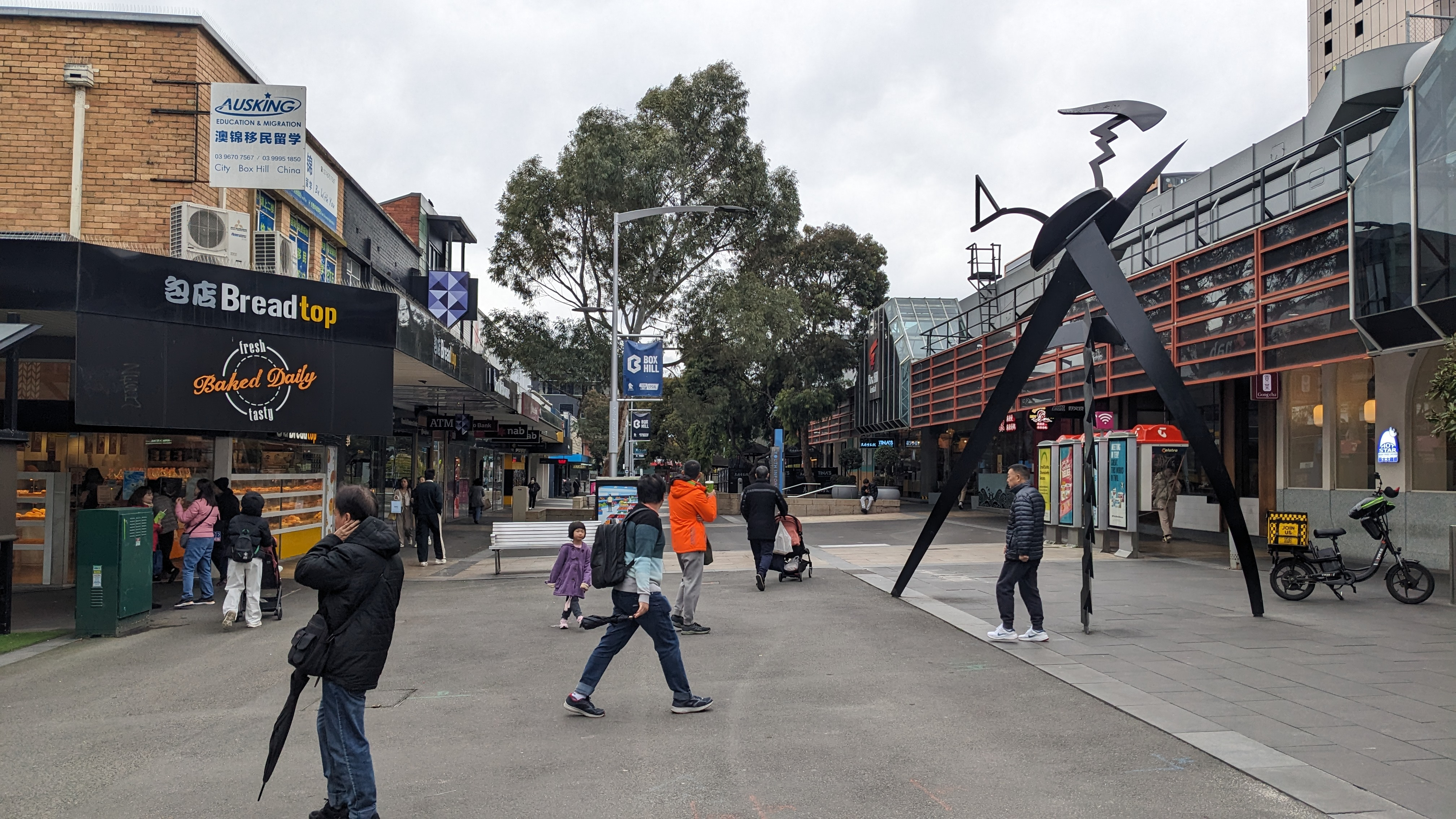
Main Street, one of two pedestrian malls located in the Box Hill CBD

==== Heritage listings ====
The following places in Box Hill are listed on the Victorian Heritage Register:

- Box Hill Cemetery Columbarium and Myer Memorial, at 395 Middleborough Rd
- Standard Brickworks, at 14 Federation St
- Willis Pipe Organ in the Wesley Uniting Church, at 8 Oxford St
- Woodhouse Grove Wesleyan Chapel (former), at 147 Woodhouse Grove

=== Parks and gardens ===
There are three main open spaces in Box Hill. These are the Box Hill Gardens, Surrey Park and R.H.L. Sparks Reserve. The majority of parks have sporting facilities and fields, including for baseball, archery and Australian football.

There are several smaller parks and gardens throughout the residential areas around the central business district.

== Demographics ==
Historical population
Year	Pop.	±%
2001	8,130	—
2006	8,616	+6.0%
2011	9,672	+12.3%
2016	11,395	+17.8%
2021	14,353	+26.0%

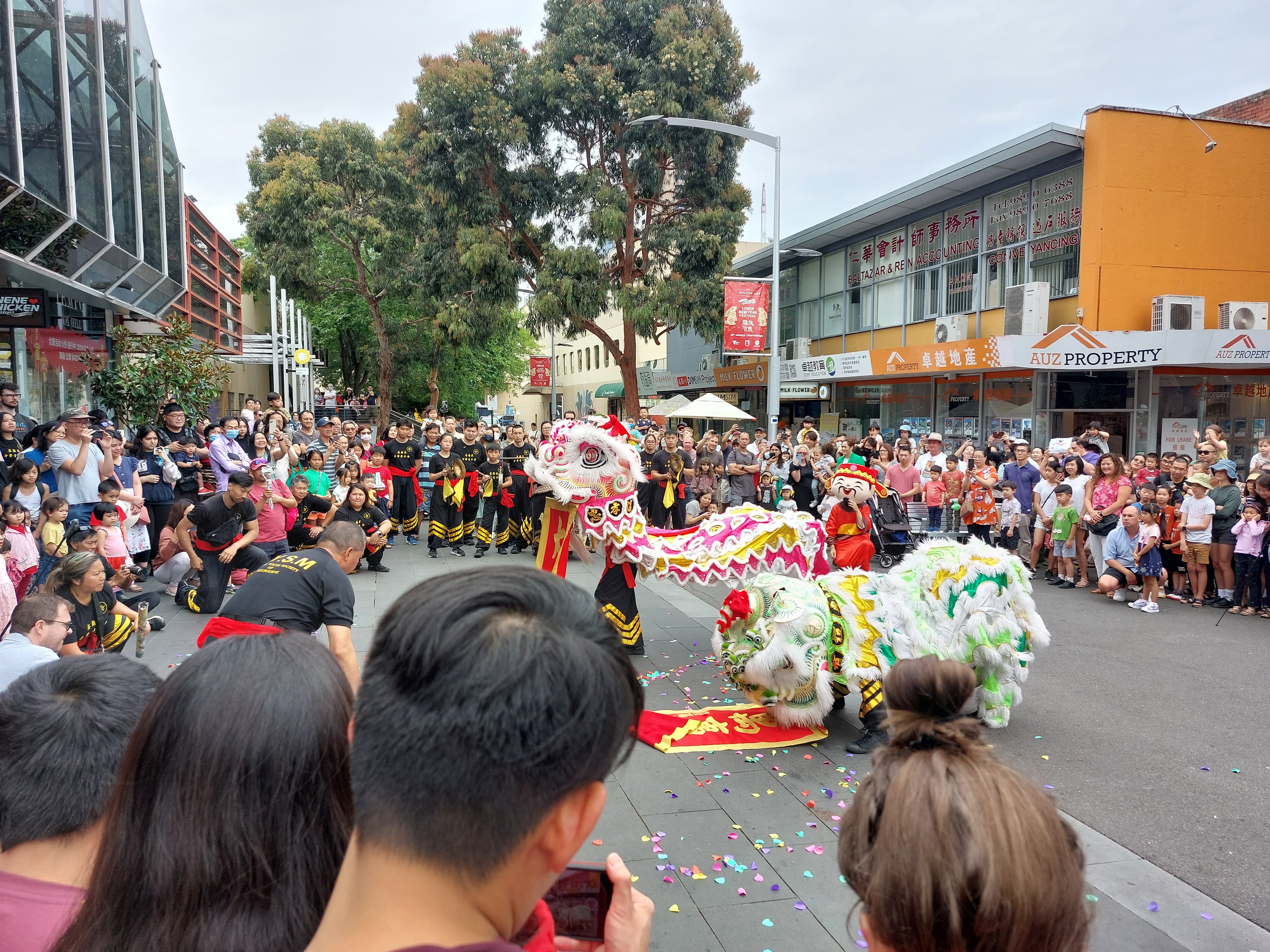
Chinese New Year celebrations at Box Hill; the suburb is home to one of the largest Chinese Australian communities in Australia

At the 2021 Australian census, 68.3% of Box Hill residents reported being born overseas, with the most common being China (excludes Taiwan and the SARs; 29.5%), Malaysia (6.4%), India (4.5%), Hong Kong (2.5%), and Vietnam (1.9%). Mandarin Chinese have overtaken English as a language spoken at home at 33.9%, with English being the second most commonly spoken language (32.5%), followed by Cantonese (8.5%), Vietnamese (1.7%), Korean (1.5%), and Hindi (1.3%). Self-described non-religious people made up the largest single group at 50.4% of the population, followed by Catholic (10.2%), Buddhism (9.0%), and Hinduism (4.5%). 9.1% of Box Hill residents did not state their religious affiliation in the census. Compared to Australia as a whole, Box Hill residents are much less likely to be Australian-born, and are more likely to have stated "No Religion" on the census. Within the City of Whitehorse, Box Hill has the largest Chinese-Australian diaspora community, and is one of the most visible Chinese-Australian communities in Australia.

Previously, in the 2016 Australian census, 64.7% of Box Hill residents reported being born in foreign countries, the most common being China (excluding Taiwan and the SARs; 27.6%), Malaysia (4.8%), India (4.2%), Hong Kong (3.0%) and South Korea (1.7%). 36.9% of residents only speak English at home. Mandarin Chinese is the second most commonly spoken language (28.3%), followed by Cantonese (9.8%), Korean (1.7%), Hindi (1.3%) and Vietnamese (1.2%). Self-described non-religious people made up the largest single group at 46.3% of the population, followed by Catholics (13.5%), Buddhists (7.8%) and Anglicans (4.5%). 10.1% of Box Hill residents did not state their religious affiliation in the census. Compared to Australia as a whole, Box Hill residents are much less likely to be Australian-born, and are more likely to have stated "No Religion" on the census.

== Transport ==
=== Road ===
The central area of the suburb is serviced by three arterial roads: Elgar Road, Whitehorse Road and Station Street. The Eastern Freeway approximately two kilometres north also provides car and truck access into the area.

=== Public transport ===
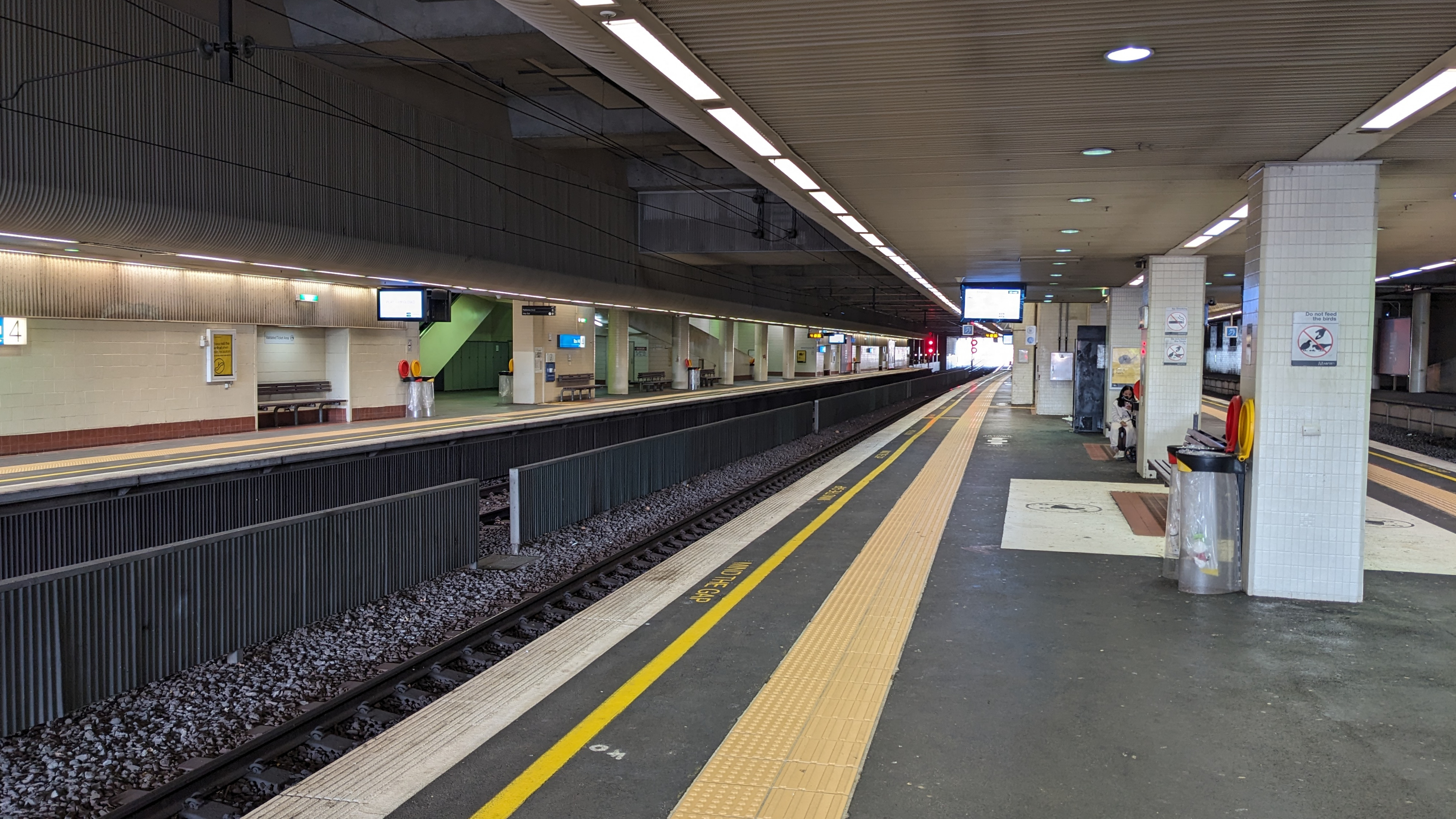
Box Hill railway station looking east from Platform 3, August 2024

Box Hill is a major public transport hub for the City of Whitehorse and surrounding suburbs. Box Hill railway station is located under Box Hill Central shopping centre and is served by the Belgrave and Lilydale railway lines. The complex also includes a large bus interchange, linking commuters to a broad range of destinations across most Melbourne suburbs.

Tram route 109, which runs along Whitehorse Road, was extended from Union Road, Mont Albert, to Box Hill and opened in May 2003. It runs to Port Melbourne via the city.

There are V/Line coaches that run from Melbourne (Southern Cross) to Mansfield / Mount Buller. The coach stop is opposite the Box Hill Town Hall on Whitehorse Road.

The final station on the first section of the Suburban Rail Loop railway is under construction at Box Hill, providing direct rail services to Cheltenham. This interchange station will connect directly to the existing underground station with entrances on both sides of Whitehorse Road. It is scheduled to open in 2035.

== Education ==
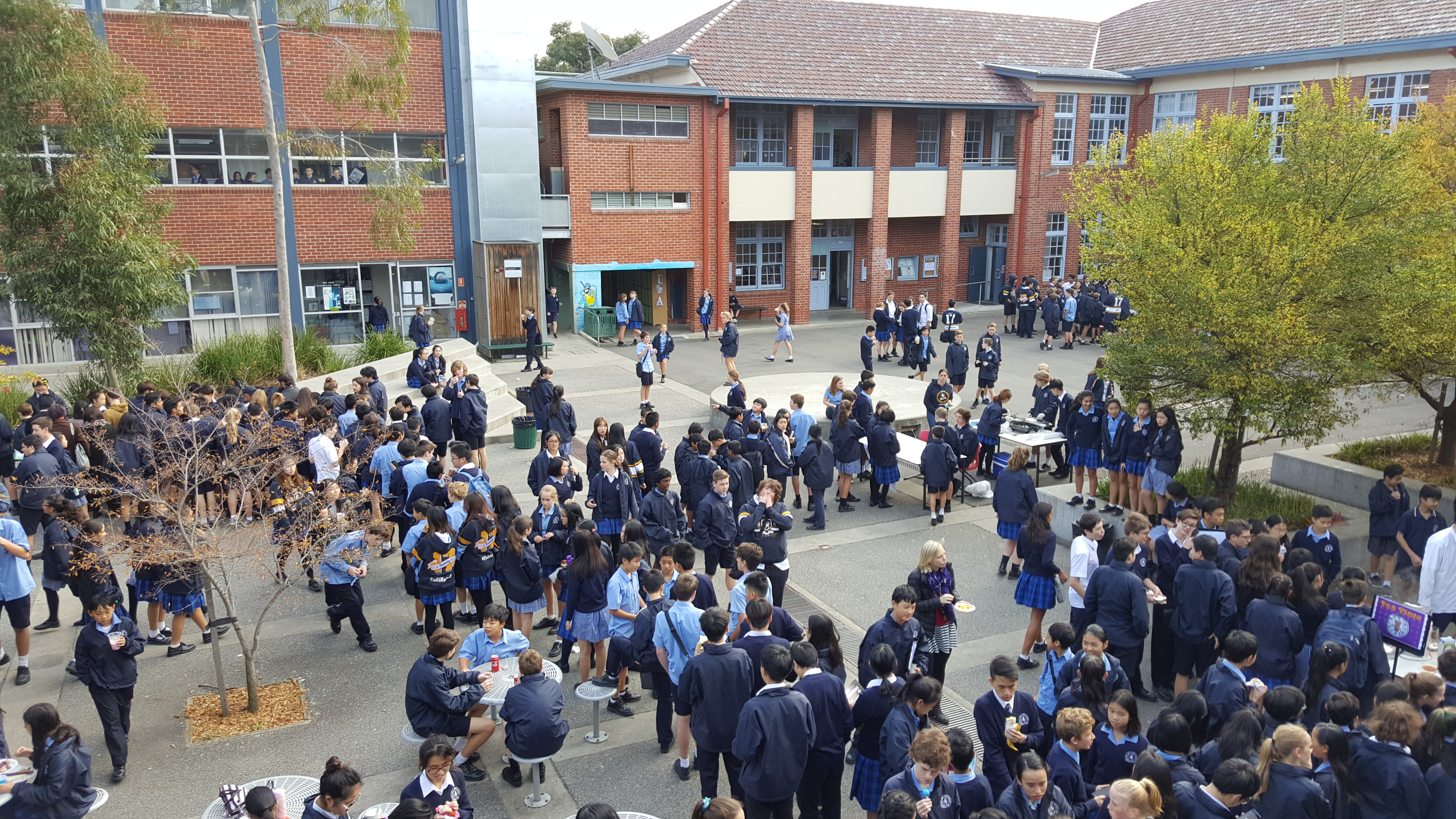
Campus of Box Hill High School

The suburb of Box Hill is served by several schools, including Box Hill High School, Box Hill Senior Secondary College, Our Lady of Sion College, Berengarra School and St. Francis Xavier's Catholic Primary School. For mature students, Box Hill Institute provides further education. There are two kindergartens in the area; St Peter's Anglican Kindergarten and Goodstart Early Learning Box Hill.

Schools in neighbouring suburbs include Koonung Secondary College, Kingswood College and Roberts McCubbin Primary School.

== Sports and recreation ==
The Box Hill Hawks are a local Australian rules football club, playing in the Victorian Football League and are based at the Box Hill City Oval. This team was formerly known as the Mustangs, named for the city's mascot, the White Horse. They are currently affiliated with the Hawthorn Hawks.

Another football team, The Whitehorse Pioneers, competes in the Eastern Football League.

Box Hill United Soccer Club currently competes in the National Premier Leagues Victoria 2.

Box Hill Athletic Club, founded in 1932, survived through the war years and became notably prominent after the 1956 Olympic Games, held in Melbourne. The club's original training ground was at Surrey Park, Elgar Road South, an area provided by the Box Hill Council.

After several years of filling in and grading, the area known as Hagenauer's Park was made available for athletics.

Box Hill has an 18-hole golf course, located at 202 Station Street. The club offers junior development programs.

In basketball, the Whitehorse Mustangs Basketball Association represents the Box Hill suburbs in domestic junior competitions of basketball. The club fields junior teams each Saturday in the Eastern District Junior Basketball Association (EDJBA), with home games played at the basketball stadium of Box Hill High School. It also runs weekly social competitions for both men and women and fields a championship men's team in the Melbourne Metropolitan Basketball League (MMBL).

The Box Hill Action Indoor Sports Centre also provides residents with dedicated facilities for indoor soccer, cricket and netball.

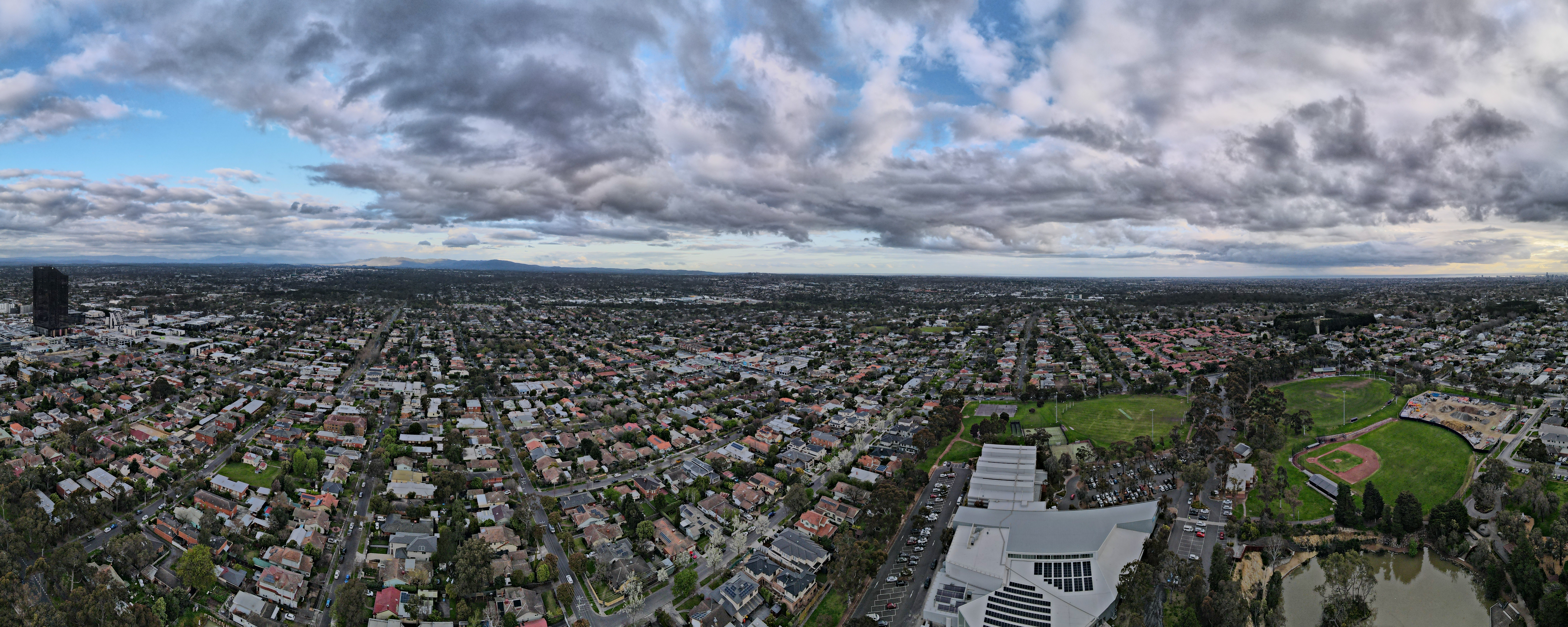
Box Hill's Surrey Park Sporting Grounds

Aqualink Box Hill (formerly Whitehorse Aquatic and Leisure Centre), run by Whitehorse Council, provides residents with an indoor and outdoor pool, basketball courts, a gym, squash and tennis courts. The swim club, Surrey Park, swim at Aqualink Box Hill. The club uses the facilities of Aqualink. The surrounding parklands include (aside from a large lake, now filled with water, but once used as a quarry) a baseball diamond, a football oval and cricket pitches.

Box Hill Rugby Club play at RHL Sparks Reserve in the Dewar Shield competition.

Box Hill is also home of a number of recreational services, such as Neighbourhood Houses; a number of Scout Groups, including 11th Box Hill; Mont Albert North (formerly 10th/13th Box Hill); 6th Box Hill; and 1st Mont Albert Scout Groups. The Box Hill Community Centre, located 1 km south of Box Hill Central, also provides a number of services to the local community.

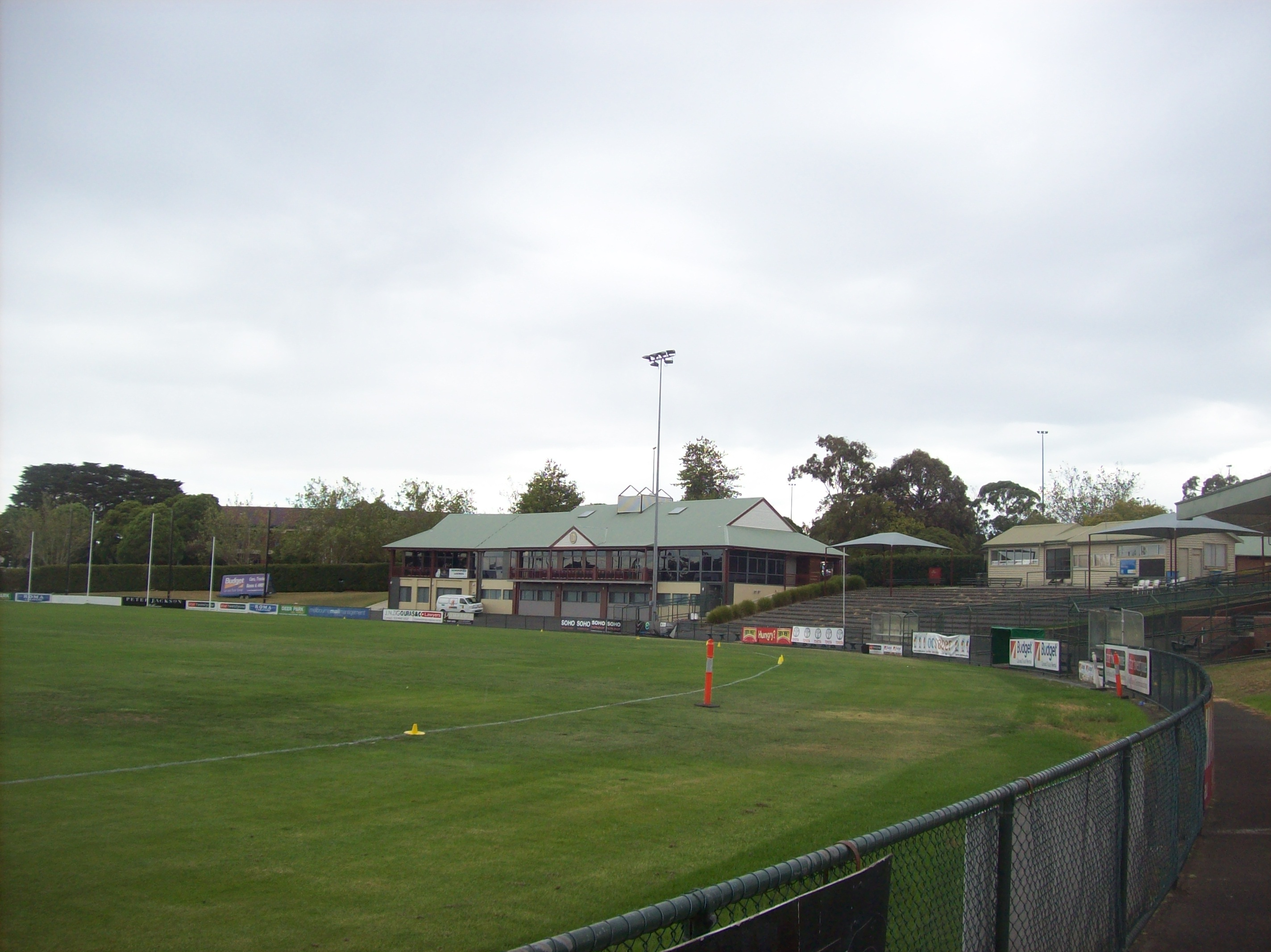
Box Hill City Oval

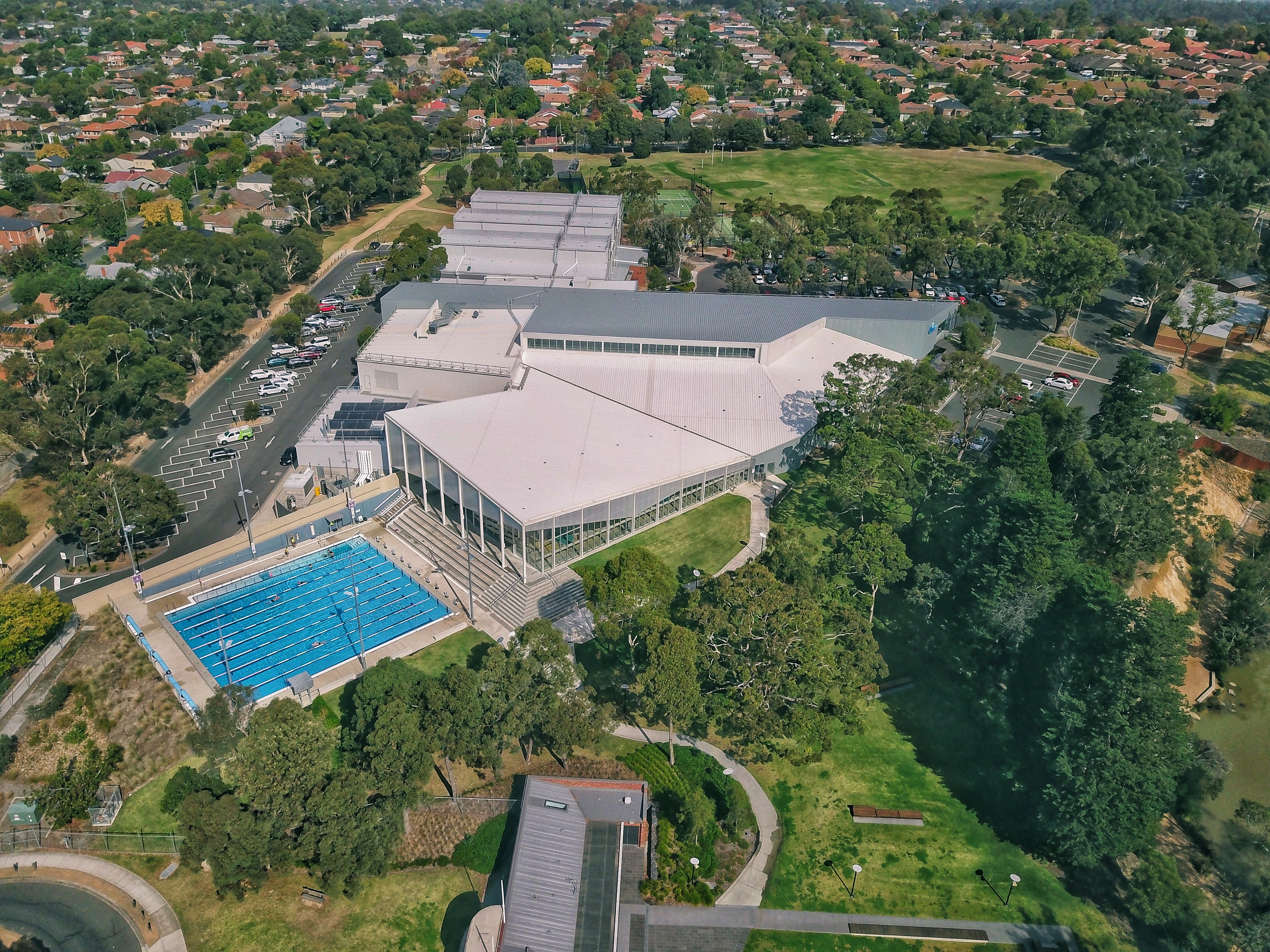
Aerial perspective of Aqualink Box Hill

== Notable people ==
=== Sportspeople ===
- Kevin Abley, Australian rules footballer
- Fred Barnes, Australian rules footballer
- Ron Black, Australian rules footballer
- Brooke Buschkuehl, long jumper
- Paula Coghlan, wheelchair basketballer
- Anthony Condon, Australian rules footballer
- Rob Dickson, Australian rules footballer
- Chika Emeagi, basketballer
- Trish Flavel, Paralympic athlete
- Matthew Gale, cricketer
- Azra Hadzic, tennis player
- Peter Handscomb, cricketer
- Sonya Hartnett, author
- Julie Hunter, cricketer
- Alice Kunek, basketballer
- Regan Lamble, athlete
- Ben Laughlin, cricketer
- Lawrence Leung, comedian
- James Linger, baseball player
- Travis Mahoney, swimmer
- Bob McLellan, Australian rules footballer
- Sam Mitchell, Australian rules footballer
- Damian Mori, soccer player
- Clive Morrison, Australian rules footballer
- Fred Petterson, Australian rules footballer
- Paul Reiffel, cricketer and umpire
- Hurtle Rice, Australian rules footballer
- Stan Rodgerson, Australian rules footballer
- Reg Sampson, Australian rules footballer
- Alan Yeomans, jockey and swimmer

=== Other ===
- Ray Argall, cinematographer
- Jack Charles, actor and activist
- Alan Collins, writer
- Ralph Hultgren, trumpet player
- Steve Irons, politician
- Rob Jolly, politician
- Quentin Kenihan, disability advocate
- Frederick Kenneth McTaggart, chemist
- Bruce Mildenhall, politician
- Kelly O'Dwyer, politician
- Mick Parker, mountaineer and graphic designer
- Stanley Porteus, psychologist
- Jared Purton, immunologist
- Mabel Pye, artist
- Dee Ryall, politician
- Arthur George Stephenson, architect
- Mike Symon, politician

== See also ==
- City of Box Hill – Box Hill was previously within this former local government area.
- Box Hill Cemetery
