= List of freeways in Victoria =

This is a list of freeways in Victoria, Australia. The Victorian road network services the population centres, with highways generally radiating from Melbourne and other major cities and rural centres with secondary roads interconnecting the highways to each other. Many of the highways are built to freeway standard. Victoria has the most extensive freeway and road network in Australia.

"Pedestrians, Bicycles, Animals, Tractors and Agricultural Machinary" are prohibited from freeways in Victoria. However, bicycles, while not permitted on Urban Freeways (freeways in Melbourne's urban limits), are permitted on Rural Freeways (freeways outside of Melbourne). A list detailing specific freeways and mandatory cyclist exit interchanges can be found in the Wiki Roads in Victoria page under the "Names and Numbering" section.

== Freeways denoted as M1 ==
=== Princes Freeway ===
The Princes Freeway is the second longest freeway after the Hume Freeway. It is 159 kilometres long. It continues on from the Princes Highway at Traralgon and ends at the Princes Highway at Geelong. It replaces the Princes Highway between Melbourne and Geelong. It has 4-6 lanes between Traralgon and Narre Warren, from there it is the Monash Freeway to Toorak Road where it continues as CityLink to the Burnley Tunnel before turning into the Westgate Freeway, at the Western Ring Road it turns back into the normal Princes Freeway, where it has eight lanes. Its major junctions are Western Ring Road, Princes Highway, Berwick-Cranbourne Road and Strzelecki Highway. It is the second busiest freeway in Victoria after the Monash Freeway. The major towns it passes through are Tralagon, Morwell, Moe, Warragul, Pakenham, Berwick and Geelong. At the Victoria/New South Wales border the freeway becomes the Princes Highway and continues up the New South Wales coast. The South Australia/Victoria border has the Princes Highway crossing the border, going through Warrnambool back up to Melbourne.

=== Monash Freeway ===
The Monash Freeway is 34 kilometres long. It continues on from the Princes Freeway at Narre Warren and turns into CityLink at Toorak. The Monash Freeway replaces the Princes Freeway between Melbourne and Narre Warren. It has 10 lanes for all the Monash Freeway's length. The Monash Freeways major junctions are South Gippsland Freeway, EastLink, Springvale Road, Burke Road and Warrigal Road. The major suburbs it passes through are Berwick, Narre Warren, Hallam, Dandenong, Mulgrave, Chadstone and Toorak.

=== CityLink ===
The underground CityLink directly connects the ends of the West Gate and Monash Freeways into one continuous through-way. This link comprises the twin Burnley and Domain Tunnels which pass under the Royal Botanic Gardens and the Yarra River, each tunnel channelling traffic in different directions.

=== West Gate Freeway ===
The West Gate Freeway is a 14 kilometre Freeway which starts at the Burnley Tunnel at Southbank and turns into the Princes Freeway near Laverton North. The Westgate Freeway replaces the Princes Freeway between Laverton and Melbourne. The West Gate Bridge is on the Westgate Freeway. The Westgate Freeway has eight lanes for its entire length. Its major junctions are the CityLink, Western Ring Road, Geelong Road, Docklands Highway, Montague Street and St Kilda Road. The major suburbs are Melbourne central business district and Laverton North.

=== Geelong Ring Road ===
The Geelong Ring Road is a freeway that bypasses Geelong.Starting at the Princes Freeway at Corio and ends at the Princes Highway at Waurn Ponds. it is 25 kilometres long. The Geelong Ring Road has four lanes for its entire length. Its major intersections are Midland Highway, Hamilton Highway, Bacchus Marsh Road and Cox Road. The Geelong Ring Road was built in sections, the first section being complete in 2008.

== Freeways denoted as M2 ==
=== CityLink ===
The elevated Western Link extends the existing Tullamarine Freeway, lengthening it to terminate it five kilometres further south at the West Gate Freeway in Port Melbourne. It includes the Bolte Bridge over the Yarra River in the Docklands; a long elevated section over Dudley Flats and Moonee Ponds Creek and a tube-like sound barrier in Flemington where the road passes close to a number of community housing towers. CityLink then continues on connecting to the Tullamarine Freeway at Strathmore.

=== Tullamarine Freeway ===
The Tullamarine Freeway is a 13 kilometre Freeway which continues on from CityLink at Strathmore and turns into Sunbury Road at Tullamarine. The Tullamarine Freeway links the Melbourne central business district to Melbourne Airport with eight lanes for its entire length. Its major junctions are Calder Freeway, Western Ring Road and Sunbury Road. The major suburbs it passes through are Strathmore and Tullamarine.

== Freeways denoted as M3 ==
=== Eastern Freeway ===
The Eastern Freeway is an 18 kilometre Freeway which continues on from EastLink at Nunawading and ends at Alexandra Parade at Collingwood. The Eastern Freeway has six lanes for all of its length. Like Eastlink The Eastern Freeway is a part of M3 route. Its major intersections are Springvale Road, Chandler Highway, Burke Road and Hoddle Street. The Major suburbs are Box Hill and Doncaster.

=== EastLink ===
Eastlink is a Tollway which continues from the Eastern Freeway at Nunawading and goes for 39 kilometres to Frankston Freeway at Carrum Downs. It has four lanes between Frankston Freeway and Thompson Road, from there it continues as six lanes. Eastlink links Frankston to Ringwood. Eastlink's major junctions are the Monash Freeway, Princes Highway, Maroondah Highway, Burwood Highway, Springvale Road and Thompsons Road. The major suburbs Eastlink passes through are Carrum Downs, Bangholme, Dandenong South, Springvale, Rowville and Ringwood.

=== Frankston Freeway ===
The Frankston Freeway is a seven kilometre freeway which is a continuation of Eastlink and begins at the Mornington Peninsula Freeway interchange at Carrum Downs and turns into the Moorooduc Highway near Cranbourne-Frankston Road at Frankston. It originally connected to the Mornigton Peninsula Freeway prior to the construction of EastLink. The Frankston Freeway has four lanes between Moorooduc Highway and Seaford Road, from there it continues as six lanes onwards. Its major junctions are EastLink, Peninsula Link, Dandenong Valley Highway and Seaford Road. The suburbs it passes through are Frankston, Seaford and Carrum Downs.

== M4 ==
=== West Gate Tunnel ===
The West Gate Tunnel is an 8-kilometre (5.0 mi) freeway-standard toll road in Melbourne, Australia, linking the West Gate Freeway at Yarraville with the Port of Melbourne and CityLink at Docklands. The western half of the toll road consists of twin tunnels - an eastbound tunnel, known as Bundawanh Tunnel, approximately 2.8 km (1.7 mi) long, and a westbound tunnel, known as Eureka Tunnel, approximately 4 km (2.5 mi) long, while the eastern half is an elevated road. Its major junctions are interchanges with Appleton Dock Road and Citylink, and an at-grade intersection with a link road to Footscray Road as well as with Wurundjeri Way and then Dynon Road. The highway opened at the end of 2025.

== M8 ==
=== Western Freeway ===
The Western Freeway is the third-longest freeway in Victoria after the Hume Freeway and the Princes Freeway. It is 125 kilometers long. It starts at the Western Ring Road at Derrimut and turns into the Western Highway near Ballarat. It replaced the Western Highway between Melbourne and Ballarat. It has four lanes between Melbourne and Ballarat but turns into two lanes after passing the Sunraysia Highway. Its major junctions are the Midland Highway, Sunraysia Highway, Melton Highway and Ballarat Road. The major towns it passes through are Derrimut, Melton, Bacchus Marsh and Ballarat.

== M11 ==
=== Mornington Peninsula Freeway ===
The Mornington Peninsula Freeway is 36 kilometres long. It starts at Dingley Bypass at Dingley Village and ends at Boneo Road at Rosebud. When it gets to Frankston Freeway it continues on as Peninsula Link before becoming the Mornington Peninsula Freeway again at the Moorooduc Highway junction. The Mornington Peninsula Freeway stays a four lane road for all its length. The major junctions are Frankston Freeway, Peninsula Link, Nepean Highway, Thompsons Road and Jetty Road. The major suburbs are Chelsea, Carrum Downs, Seaford, Moorooduc, Safety Beach, Dromana and Mount Martha. Peninsula Link is a 25 kilometre Freeway. It starts at Mornington Peninsula Freeway and EastLink and ends at Moorooduc Highway & Mornington Peninsula Freeway. The major junctions are Frankston Dandenong Road, Cranbourne-Frankston Road and Frankston-Flinders Road. The major suburbs are Carrum Downs, Frankston East, Baxter and Moorooduc.

== M31 ==
=== Hume Freeway ===
The Hume Freeway is the longest freeway in Victoria at 303 kilometres long. It starts at the M80 Ring Road at Thomastown, Melbourne and ends at the Hume Highway in Albury-Wodonga at the New South Wales border. It replaces the Hume Highway in most of Victoria. It has four lanes all the way through to Albury-Wodonga. It has a lot of major junctions such as the Goulburn Valley Freeway, Goulburn Valley Highway, Murray Valley Highway and Northern Highway. The major towns it passes through are Seymour, Benalla, Wangaratta, Wodonga and Albury.

== M39 ==
=== Goulburn Valley Freeway ===
The Goulburn Valley Freeway is 42 kilometres long. It starts at the Hume Freeway at Seymour and turns into the Goulburn Valley Highway near Nagambie. It replaces the Goulburn Valley Highway between Seymour and Nagambie. It has six lanes all the way to Nagambie. Its major junctions are Goulburn Valley Highway and Avenel-Nagambie Road. The major towns it passes through is Seymour.

== M79 ==
=== Calder Freeway ===
The Calder Freeway is 113 kilometres long. It starts at the Tullamarine Freeway interchange in Essendon and turns into the Calder Highway near Castlemaine. It replaced the Calder Highway between Melbourne and Castlemaine. It has six lanes between Melbourne and Gisborne with four lanes beyond. Its major junctions are the Western Ring Road, Midland Highway and the Pyrenees Highway. The major towns the freeway goes through are Sunbury, Gisborne, Macedon, Woodend, Kyneton and Castlemaine.

== M80 ==
=== Ring Road ===
The M80 Ring Road (also known as the Western Ring Road in the West of Melbourne and Metropolitan Ring Road in the Northern Suburbs) is 38 kilometres long. It starts at the West Gate and Princes Freeway interchange at Laverton North and continues around the Western and northern suburbs of Melbourne before continuing as the North East Link at Greensborough. Its major intersections are Western Freeway, Calder Freeway, Tullamarine Freeway and the Hume Freeway. The major suburbs it passes through are Laverton North, Albion, Keilor Park, Fawkner, Greensborough and Watsonia North.

=== North East Link ===
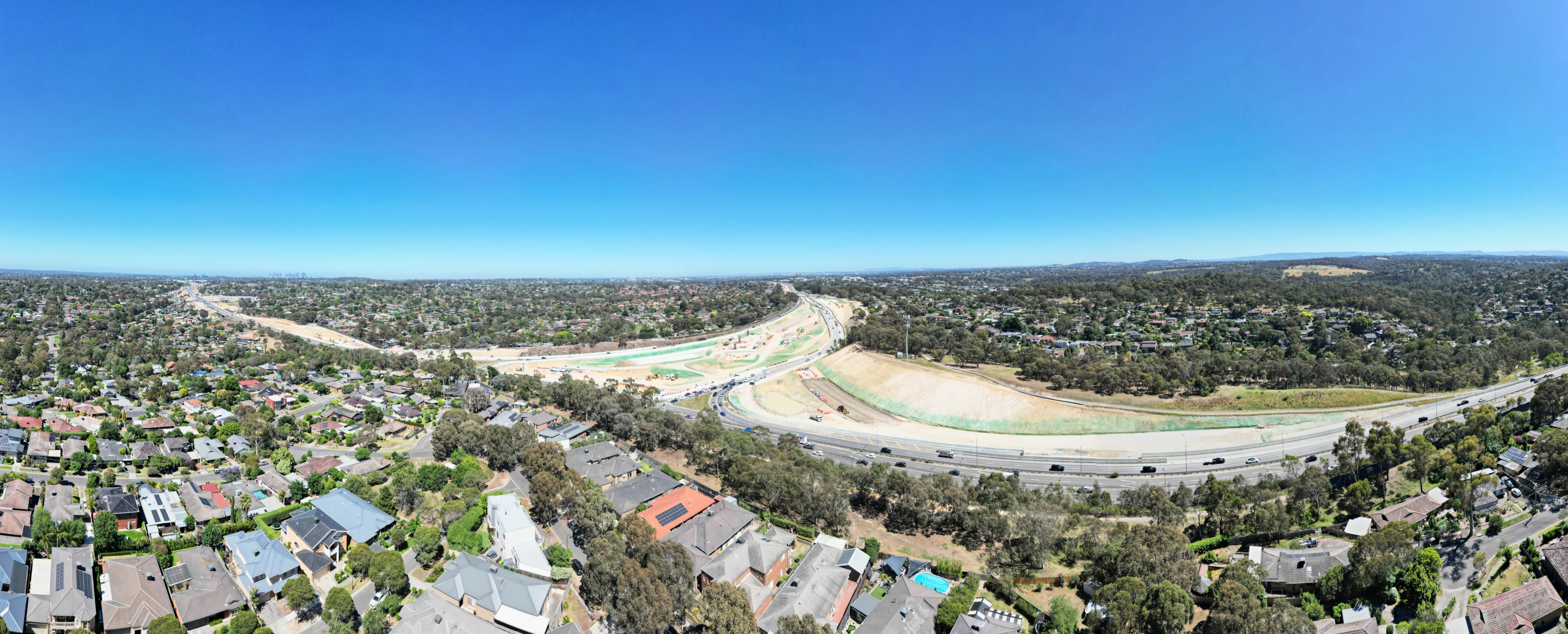
North East Link where Greensborough meets the M80

== M420 ==
=== South Gippsland Freeway ===
The South Gippsland Freeway is a six kilometre freeway which starts at the Monash Freeway at Dandenong and ends at the South Gippsland Highway, turning into the Western Port Highway at Lynbrook. It has four lanes for all its length. It is the shortest freeway in all of Victoria. It links Cranbourne to Dandenong. Its major junctions are Monash Freeway, Princes Highway, South Gippsland Highway and Pound Road. The suburbs it goes through are Lynbrook, Doveton and Dandenong.
