= Mornington Peninsula Freeway =

Freeway in south-eastern Melbourne, Victoria, Australia

Mornington Peninsula Freeway Peninsula Link Victoria
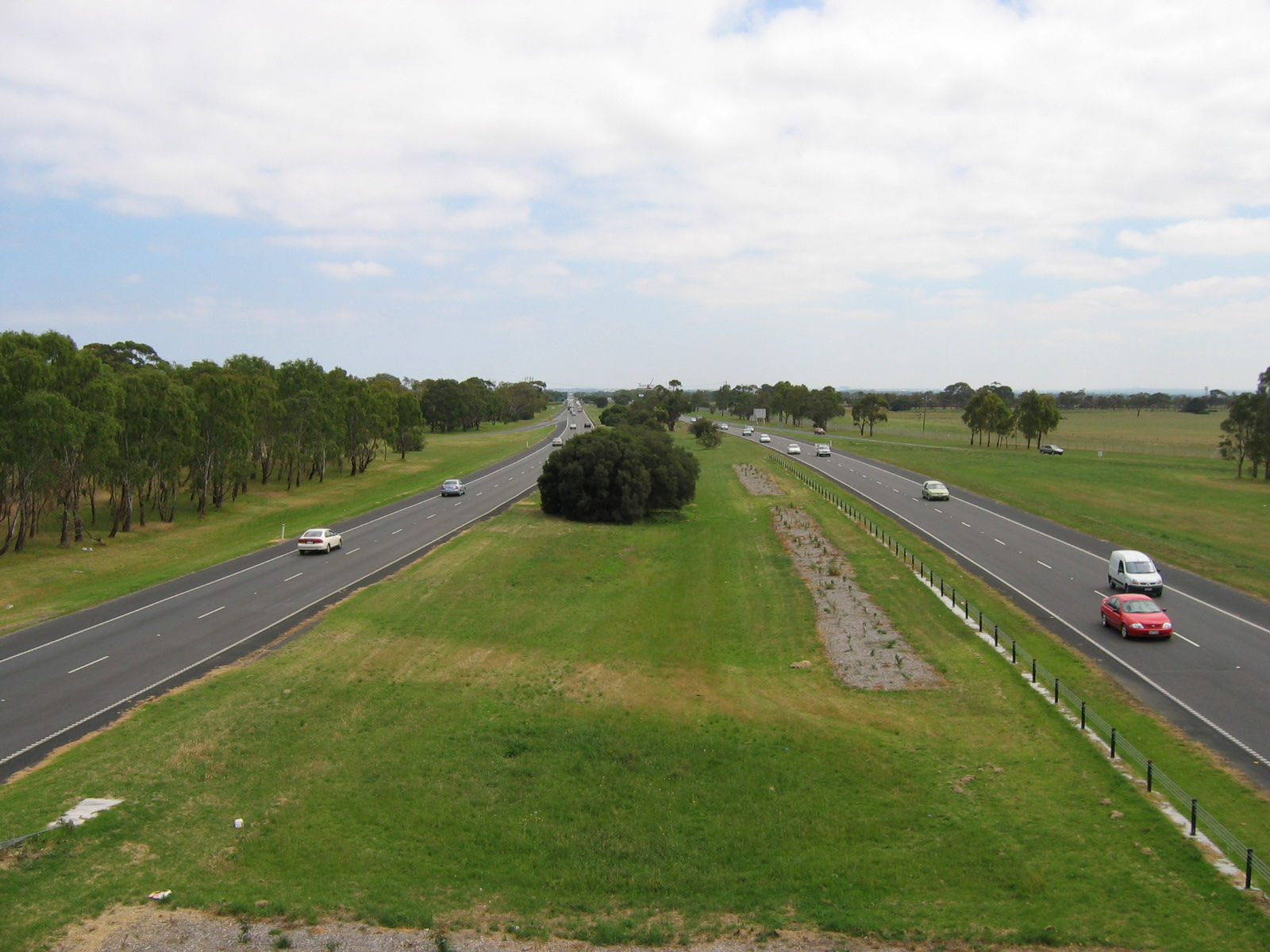
- Mornington Peninsula Freeway at Patterson Lakes
- Coordinates: 37.960276°S 145.118726°E (North end); 38.376729°S 144.889097°E (South end)

General information
- Type: Freeway
- Length: 60.1 km (37 mi)
- Opened: 1971–2021
- Route number(s): M11 (2013–present)
- Former route number: Metro Route 11 (1980–2013) (Northern section: Chelsea Heights–Carrum Downs); Metro Route 11 (1989–2013) (Southern section: Moorooduc–Rosebud); Freeway Route 87 (1971–1988) (Dromana–Rosebud); Concurrencies: B110 (1998–2013) (Safety Beach–Mount Martha); Metro Route 3 (1984–1998) (Safety Beach–Mount Martha)

Major junctions
- North end: Dingley Bypass; Dingley Village, Melbourne
- Centre Dandenong Road; Lower Dandenong Road; Governor Road; Springvale Road; Thames Promenade; Thompson Road; Rutherford Road; Frankston Freeway; EastLink; Frankston–Dandenong Road; Cranbourne–Frankston Road; Golf Links Road; Frankston-Flinders Road; Mornington-Tyabb Road; Moorooduc Highway; Nepean Highway; Arthurs Seat Road
- South end: Boneo Road; Rosebud, Victoria

Location(s)
- Major suburbs: Braeside, Chelsea Heights, Patterson Lakes, Seaford, Frankston, Baxter, Moorooduc, Tuerong, Dromana, McCrae

Highway system
- Highways in Australia; National Highway • Freeways in Australia; Highways in Victoria

The Mornington Peninsula Freeway is a freeway in Melbourne, Victoria, Australia, that provides a link from south-eastern suburban Melbourne to the Mornington Peninsula. Whilst the entire freeway from Dingley Village to Rosebud is declared by VicRoads as the Mornington Peninsula Freeway, the section between EastLink in Carrum Downs and Moorooduc Highway in Moorooduc is locally and commonly known as Peninsula Link, and is operated and maintained privately. (Note: The entire length of the corridor is considered the Mornington Peninsula Freeway within this article for sake of completion, as well to avoid confusion between declarations.) The northern section of the freeway was the most recent section to open in 2021, and was known as Mordialloc Freeway during construction.

The entire freeway corridor bears the designation M11.

== Route ==
The Mornington Peninsula Freeway begins at the Dingley Bypass in Dingley Village and travels southbound towards Chelsea Heights and the EastLink/Frankston Freeway interchange in Carrum Downs, running roughly parallel to the existing Boundary Road/Wells Road corridor. From here, it continues in a south-easterly direction changing its local name to Peninsula Link. Peninsula Link runs for 25 kilometres, bypassing Central Frankston to the east until it meets Moorooduc Highway, at which points the local name reverts to Mornington Peninsula Freeway. The freeway then continues southwest until Boneo Road, in Rosebud. This section of the freeway passes through vineyards, stud farms and gardens along the Mornington Peninsula. The final section of the road between Jetty Road and Boneo Road is a two lane, single carriageway road. Despite this, this section is still classed as a Freeway by VicRoads and carries the M11 designation.

On the urban section of Mornington Peninsula Freeway (between Dingley Village and Carrum Downs), the standard travel time in both directions is 10 minutes: 2 minutes between Dingley Bypass and Lower Dandenong Road, 3 minutes between Lower Dandenong Road and Springvale Road, and 5 minutes between Springvale Road and the EastLink / Frankston Freeway. The usual peak period travel time is between 13 and 24 minutes; however, in times of extreme congestion or traffic incidents, the travel time can well exceed 30 minutes.

== History ==
=== Northern section (Springvale Road–Frankston Freeway) ===
The original northern section (prior to the 2021 northern extension) was built originally as an extension of Frankston Freeway, a short but wide 2 km length curve opening to the Eel Race Drain in 1976. This was followed by a 13 km section further north to Springvale Road in Chelsea Heights, opening on 18 March 1980 alongside Wells Road, subsuming portions of it and ultimately replacing it as a through route. A plan to complete the rest of the freeway northwards from Springvale Road was cancelled by a change of Government in 1982, electing to duplicate Wells Road through Aspendale and Boundary Road through Braeside instead.

Mornington Peninsula Freeway's northern section was first signed Metropolitan Route 11 when the Eel Race Drain to Frankston Freeway stage opened in 1976, and was completely re-routed from Wells Road when the last replacement stage of Frankston Freeway opened in 1980. Despite the fact most Victorian Freeways converted to the alphanumeric system by 1998, this section retained the Metropolitan Route 11 designation. Finally in 2013, with the opening of Peninsula Link, this section was reassigned M11.

=== Southern section ===
Plans for the southern section as "Mornington Peninsula By-pass Road" had been made as far back as 1966, between Nepean Highway in Dromana and Eastbourne Road at Rosebud. It was built in small successive sections, starting at Nepean Highway at Dromana in late 1971 eventually to Jetty Road at Rosebud South in 1975. Another single-carriageway section between Dromana and the Nepean Highway at Mount Martha opened in 1984, later duplicated in 1989. The last extension between Mount Martha and Moorooduc South linking to Moorooduc Highway was opened in 1993 and finally duplicated in 1994.

Mornington Peninsula Freeway's southern section was initially designated Freeway Route 87, this was removed in 1987. In 1989, Metropolitan Route 11 extended to the southern section via Frankston Freeway and Moorooduc Highway, when upgrades to Moorooduc Road and the duplication of the Dromana-Mount Martha section were completed, and re-routed from Moorooduc Road when the last extension to Tuerong opened in 1994. Similar to the Northern section, Metropolitan Route 11 was retained until 2013 when it was replaced by M11.

=== Peninsula Link (Frankston Bypass) ===
The 'Frankston Bypass', connecting the northern and southern sections, has been proposed numerous times over the years, appearing in the 1969 Melbourne Transportation Plan. The Mornington Peninsula Freeway was progressively opened at each end by the 1980s, with the Frankston Freeway also opened running south from Seaford into Frankston itself. The contract for the construction of the EastLink Tollway north from Seaford was signed in 2004, with construction starting the following year. EastLink opened in 2008.

In early 2006, operator of EastLink, ConnectEast, offered to build the bypass by June 2009, but was rejected by the state government. The government would be required to contribute $100 million to the project, which would also have been funded through a 1c-2c increase in tolls. ConnectEast also wanted the EastLink concession period extended from 39 to 49 years. A leaked report sent by VicRoads to the City of Frankston in 2006 and obtained by the State Opposition in 2008 showed the cost of building the Frankston bypass was $240 million.

In October 2006, $6.5 million was allocated by the Bracks Government towards extra ramps at the Frankston end of EastLink to cater for a future bypass. Recommended by the Southern and Eastern Integrated Transport Authority (SEITA), the Transport Minister said that "no decision has been made about the requirement for a bypass of Frankston". For the 2006 State Election Liberal opposition leader Ted Baillieu promised $250 million to build a 22 kilometre long road toll free. Peter Batchelor responded that the costing did not add up, with smaller projects costing more.

Also in October 2006, then Transport Minister Peter Batchelor announced that an Environment Effects Statement would be carried out by SEITA for the bypass, and $20 million would be spent on changes to the Cranbourne-Frankston Road and Moorooduc Road intersection. Work on the EES started in March 2007 at a cost of $5 million.

The construction of EastLink and its interchange with the northern section led to speculation of possible congestion on the Frankston Freeway, especially at the southern terminus at McMahons Road on the Moorooduc Highway. This possible congestion was expected to be alleviated by the construction of a Frankston Bypass to fill a missing section of the Mornington Peninsula Freeway. VicRoads however did not anticipate such congestion on the Frankston Freeway would actually occur. Federal MP Bruce Billson however, believed otherwise, and raised the issue in parliament and the local press. The Victorian Transport Minister Peter Batchelor stated that simply because the freeway's projected path appeared on a map (referring to the route shown in the Melway street directory), that it did not mean that the road was intended to, or would ever actually be built. City of Frankston councillors however, along with Mr. Billson, pushed for the bypass to be built.

On 28 October 2007, the Federal Liberal Party pledged a maximum of $150 million towards constructing the road toll-free if elected, to be matched by Victorian Government. They were defeated at the election. In April 2008, the Southern and Eastern Integrated Transport Authority (SEITA) decided that the preferred option for a Frankston Bypass was a high standard, continuous, duplicated road in the existing road reserve from Carrum Downs to Mount Martha. A group of Moorooduc residents claimed they were not consulted in the first phase of the project, and the figures had been skewed to show public support for the selected preferred option. The report said:

Traffic on the Moorooduc Highway through Frankston is expected to increase from 45,000 vehicles per day to around 60,000 vehicles per day in 2031....it would take 75 minutes to travel between the southern end of Eastlink and the Mornington Peninsula Freeway at Mount Martha during peak periods in 2031. A high standard, continuous, duplicated road from the southern end of Eastlink to the Mornington Peninsula Freeway at Mount Martha would reduce travel time in 2031 to around 20 minutes. These projected traffic conditions would arise, even with planned upgrades to roads such as the widening of Western Port Highway. 84% of people who provided feedback during Phase 1 supported a bypass.

The Frankston Bypass would be a 25 km freeway standard road with two lanes in each direction with a speed limit of 100 km/h. A full grade separated junction would be provided with EastLink and the Frankston Freeway, along with full grade-separated diamond interchanges at Dandenong-Frankston Road, Cranbourne-Frankston Road, Golf Links Road, Frankston-Flinders Road, Bungower Road and Old Moorooduc Road / Mornington Peninsula Freeway. Interchanges at Skye Road and Mornington-Tyabb Road will have half-diamond grade-separated interchanges with northbound entry and southbound exit ramps. The cost was estimated between $500 million to $750 million.

In September 2008, ConnectEast held talks with Roads Minister Tim Pallas, but the State Government refused to discuss the issue with the media, or promise to build it without tolls. On 16 October 2008 State Premier John Brumby announced the bypass would be built. Costing $700 million and now 27 kilometres long, work would start by the end of 2009. The State Government expected the project would be paid for in partnership with the Federal Government, and confirmed that it would be toll-free.

Throughout 2008 and early 2009, the State Government examined a number of Public Private Partnership (PPP) models for the delivery of the project, selecting the Partnerships Victoria 'Availability' model, where the private sector company designs, builds, finances and operates the project for an agreed period of time, with the State Government making regular payments to the company based on performance against a set of key performance indicators, which avoided any charges being imposed on road users. The PPP was managed by the Linking Melbourne Authority (formerly SEITA) and delivered by private sector partner Southern Way, with the State Government providing quarterly payments for delivery under an availability model, with no charges to motorists. An invitation for Expressions of Interest was issued in March 2009 followed by a Request for Proposals, with two bidders short listed by November 2009. Final bids were received a month later, with the Southern Way consortium (made up of construction companies Abigroup and Bilfinger Berger, along with financier Royal Bank of Scotland) being awarded the contract to design, build and operate the freeway on 20 January 2010.

The contract with Southern Way to design, construct and finance the freeway was signed in January 2010, with a total project delivery cost for the two parties being $759 million: made up of Southern Way's construction costs, along with the Linking Melbourne Authority's land acquisition, project management, environmental effects statement and Environment Protection and Biodiversity Conservation Act costs. Construction commenced in February 2010, with completion expected in early 2013, with Southern Way to operate and maintain the freeway for the next 25 years. The Victorian Parliament enacted legislation, the Road Management Amendment (Peninsula Link) Act 2012, in November 2012 to confer rights on the private operator to manage and maintain the road. These payments are adjusted on an availability basis, with reductions being made when each half-hour of unavailability, weighted according to the nature and severity of the unavailability. Failure to meet key performance indicators for emergency contact points, incident response, compliance with operational plans, maintenance inspections and works, reporting and environmental management will also results in the government deductions being applied to the service payments.

Peninsula Link opened on 18 January 2013 and completed the missing section of the Mornington Peninsula Freeway, running from the EastLink interchange at Seaford, Melbourne, running along the eastern fringe of Frankston. It runs via Baxter and Moorooduc almost parallel to the existing arterial Moorooduc Highway.

When Peninsula Link was opened, the route numbers were slightly altered. The Frankston Freeway (which previously carried Metropolitan Route 11 along with the sections of the Mornington Peninsula Freeway and Moorooduc Highway) now carries the M3 route from the EastLink interchange, while the whole of Mornington Peninsula Freeway, including the Peninsula Link, is designated M11.

==== Peninsula Link Trail ====
A walking and cycling path - The Peninsula Link Trail - was constructed alongside the freeway. Stretching from the Patterson River in Patterson Lakes to the Moorooduc Highway in Mount Eliza, it is concrete paved and easy to navigate. An interactive map of the Peninsula Link Trail and other walking and cycling paths in Melbourne is available here.

In 2019, Mornington Peninsula Shire launched an initiative with the aim of extending the trail from Mount Eliza to Mornington.

=== Northern extension ===
A reservation for a northern extension of the Mornington Peninsula Freeway between Springvale Road in Aspendale Gardens and the Dingley Bypass in Dingley Village has been in place for many years. The reservation is bordered by residential housing and industrial estates to the west, and Braeside Park to the east.

In October 2014 a feasibility study found that a freeway standard road was not required. However, an arterial road, called the Mordialloc Bypass, in the freeway reservation was considered to be the optimal solution. If in the future any freeway was to be considered, it would have been most likely the Dingley Arterial would be upgraded to freeway standard. The 2014 State Budget included $10.6 million over 4 years to undertake detailed planning and project development. The arterial road would have probably consisted of a divided road, at-grade traffic-light controlled intersections, a speed limit of 80 km/h and bike/pedestrian paths.

On 2 May 2017, the state government announced that it had allocated $300 million in the State budget to completing the Mordialloc Bypass as an arterial road, with an overpass to be constructed at the Springvale Road intersection. On 9 April 2018, the state Labor government announced an extra $75 million in funding and that the road would instead be built as a freeway with four lanes and grade separations along the entire length. The freeway was named Mordialloc Freeway during construction. In October 2018, the state government produced plans for the freeway, with a public consultation period.

The state government claimed that the freeway would "improve travel times and ease congestion in Melbourne's south east" and provide "safer, more reliable journeys". The government promises the freeway will save 10 minutes off journeys during evening peak hour between the Springvale Road and the Dingley Bypass with the freeway carrying 80,000 cars daily by 2031. The freeway is set to remove up to 13,000 trucks from the nearby local and arterial roads each day. It will also improve access to Monash, Melbourne's largest employment area outside of the CBD, and to the Moorabbin Airport area. The Dingley Bypass will also have an extra 7900 cars daily due to the freeway in 2031. Noise walls are also expected along the new freeway to reduce vehicle noise near residential areas as well as a shared user path along the entire freeway.

A CPB / Seymour Whyte joint venture and McConnell Dowell / Decmil joint venture submitted tenders to build the freeway. The McConnell Dowell / Decmil joint venture was announced as the preferred contractor in 2019. Construction started in October 2019 and the freeway was opened as an extension of the Mornington Peninsula Freeway on 21 November 2021 with all signage reflecting this.

The extension involved the construction of 6 new bridges, 4 new grade-separated interchanges as well as a new full diamond interchange with Thames Promenade on the previous northern section. The extension also included the construction on a new shared walking and cycling path. The extension was built with entry and exit ramps on major roads including Springvale, Governor, Lower Dandenong and Centre Dandenong Roads. The extension intersects Dingley Bypass with traffic lights. A new shared walking and cycling path was also built along the extension.

=== Timeline of construction ===
- 1971 – Southern section, 1.5 miles (2.4 km) from Nepean Highway to McCulloch Street, Dromana, opened December 1971.
- 1972 – Southern section, extended 1 mile (1.6 km) for a total of 2.5 miles (4.0 km) south-west from Nepean Highway at Dromana, opened December 1972.
- 1973 – Southern section, extended 2.5 miles (4.0 km) to Jetty Road at Rosebud South, for a total of 5 miles (8.0 km) from Nepean Highway at Dromana, including completion of Burrell Road (today Latrobe Parade) overpass, opened December 1973.
- 1975 – Southern section completed between Rosebud South and Dromana, elimination of last at-grade intersection with the $7 million Kangerong Avenue overpass in Dromana, opened July 1975.
- 1976 – Northern section, 2 km section from Frankston Freeway to Eel Race Drain, opened November 1976, at a cost of $1.1 million.
- 1980 – Northern section, extended 6.7 km from Eel Race Drain to Springvale Road, opened by Minister for Transport the Hon Robert Maclellan MLA, on 18 March 1980, at a cost of $14 million.
- 1984 – Southern section, initial 5 km two-lane single carriageway between Dromana and Nepean Highway at Mount Martha, opened by Federal Minister for Transport the Hon. Peter Morris MHR on 8 June 1984, including dual-carriageway interchange over Nepean Highway at Dromana.
- 1989 – Southern section, Dromana to Mount Martha duplicate carriageway, opened 16 May 1989, at a cost of $5 million.
- 1993 – Southern section, initial 6 km dual-lane single carriageway from Mount Martha to Moorooduc Road in Tuerong, opened in June 1993, at a cost of $5 million.
- 1994 – Southern section, Mount Martha to Tuerong duplicate carriageway, opened in May 1994, at a cost of $2.5 million.
- 2013 – Peninsula Link, 25 km connecting the Northern and Southern sections, opened on 18 January 2013, at a cost of $759 million.
- 2021 – Northern extension, extended 9 km from Springvale Road in Aspendale Gardens to Dingley Bypass in Dingley Village, completed on 21 November 2021, at a cost of $523 million.

In early 2017 digital real-time travel time signage was installed to assist motorists travelling on the Mornington Peninsula Freeway.

In September 2018 flexible safety barriers were installed between Jetty Road and Boneo Road along the freeway. Barriers were also installed along the centre of the road which were completed in December 2018. In 2018 noise walls on the freeway have also been campaigned for in Safety Beach, Dromana, McCrae and Rosebud.

=== 1969 Melbourne Transportation Plan ===
The freeway was originally designated in the 1969 Melbourne Transportation Plan as the F6 Freeway corridor.

== Proposed extensions ==
Extensions of the Mornington Peninsula Freeway have been developed for the southern end to support growing traffic demand. Traffic demand is expected to increase by nearly 10 per cent along the Mornington Peninsula Freeway between 2021 and 2031.

=== Southern extension (Rosebud to Blairgowrie) ===
In July 2018 the Mornington Peninsula council conducted a Southern Peninsula Arterial Corridor Investigation with plans to extend the freeway south to Blairgowrie through the Tootgarook Wetlands. A public acquisition overlay exists from the end of the Mornington Peninsula Freeway to Melbourne Road which has reserved the land for a freeway extension. A full freeway would cost $500 million with additional bridges over the wetlands costing $3 billion in total. The freeway extension would terminate at Melbourne Road at the intersection of Canterbury Jetty Road in Blairgowrie after bypassing Rye, Tootgarook and Capel Sound. Currently where the southern section reaches Jetty Road in Rosebud, freeway conditions end, with a two-lane, single carriageway link from Jetty Road to Boneo Road. From Jetty Road the freeway was meant to adopt full freeway standards with overpasses over Jetty Road and Boneo Road, but this section has remained incomplete since 1975. In July 2018 the Rye Internal Bypass was another project proposed to reduce traffic congestion in the area in the medium term at a cost of $5 million.

The Baillieu government committed $200,000 to a congestion study for the southern peninsula which was completed in 2012.

== Exits and intersections ==
LGA	Location	km	mi	Exit	Destinations	Notes
Kingston	Dingley Village	0.0	0.0		Dingley Bypass (Metro Route 87) – Moorabbin, Dandenong South	Northern terminus of freeway and route M11 at traffic lights
Kingston	Dingley Village	1.4	0.87	3	Centre Dandenong Road (B980) – Dingley Village, Cheltenham	Northbound exit and southbound entrance only
Kingston	Dingley Village–Braeside boundary	3.1	1.9	4	Lower Dandenong Road (Metro Route 10) – Dandenong, Mentone	Northbound exit via Woodlands Drive
Kingston	Braeside–Waterways boundary	5.6	3.5	5	Governor Road (Metro Route 12) – Mordialloc, Narre Warren	
Kingston–Greater Dandenong boundary	Aspendale Gardens–Chelsea Heights–Bangholme tripoint	7.6	4.7	6	Springvale Road (Metro Route 40) – Edithvale, Springvale	
Kingston–Greater Dandenong boundary	Chelsea Heights–Bangholme boundary	9.8	6.1	7	Thames Promenade (C996) – Chelsea, Bangholme	
Kingston–Greater Dandenong boundary	Patterson Lakes–Bangholme boundary	12.5	7.8	8	Thompson Road (Metro Route 6) – Carrum, Cranbourne	
Frankston	Carrum Downs–Seaford boundary	15.4	9.6	9	Frankston Freeway (M3) – Frankston	Southbound exit to and northbound entrance from Frankston Freeway only
Frankston	Carrum Downs–Seaford boundary	15.4	9.6	9	EastLink (M3) – Dandenong, Melbourne	Northbound exit to and southbound entrance from EastLink only
Frankston	Carrum Downs–Seaford boundary	15.8	9.8	10	Rutherford Road (B664) – Seaford	Southbound exit from Frankston Freeway ramp only
Frankston	Carrum Downs–Seaford boundary	17.4	10.8	11	Frankston–Dandenong Road (Metro Route 9) – Frankston, Dandenong	
Frankston	Frankston–Langwarrin boundary	21.3	13.2	12	Skye Road – Langwarrin, Frankston	Southbound exit and northbound entrance only
Frankston	Frankston–Langwarrin boundary	23.0	14.3	13	Cranbourne–Frankston Road (Metro Route 4/Tourist Drive 12) – Frankston, Cranbourne	
Frankston–Mornington Peninsula boundary	Langwarrin South–Frankston South–Baxter tripoint	25.9	16.1	14	Golf Links Road (Tourist Drive 12) – Frankston, Baxter	
Mornington Peninsula	Baxter	27.9	17.3	15	Frankston–Flinders Road (C777) – Frankston, Hastings	
Mornington Peninsula	Baxter	29.4	18.3	16	PenLink Northbound BP Service Centre	Northbound exit and entrance only
Mornington Peninsula	Baxter	29.4	18.3	16	PenLink Southbound BP Service Centre	Southbound exit and entrance only
Mornington Peninsula	Moorooduc	32.8	20.4	17	Bungower Road – Mornington, Somerville	
Mornington Peninsula	Moorooduc	35.0	21.7	18	Mornington–Tyabb Road (C782) – Mornington, Tyabb	Southbound exit and northbound entrance only
Mornington Peninsula	Moorooduc–Mount Martha–Tuerong tripoint	40.0	24.9	19	Moorooduc Highway (C784 north) – Mornington; Old Moorooduc Road (C784 south) – Balnarring	
Mornington Peninsula	Mount Martha–Tuerong boundary	44.8	27.8		Nepean Highway (B110 north, B110/C787 south) – Mornington, Red Hill	
Mornington Peninsula	Safety Beach–Dromana boundary	49.8	30.9		Nepean Highway (B110/C788) – Safety Beach, Red Hill	Northbound exit via Ponderosa Place
Mornington Peninsula	Dromana	52.7	32.7		McCulloch Street (C789 north) – Dromana; Arthurs Seat Road (C789 west) – Arthurs Seat; Caldwell Road (south) – Dromana; Boundary Road (east) – Dromana	Southbound entrance via Arthurs Seat Road, southbound exit via Boundary Road
Mornington Peninsula	McCrae	56.1	34.9		Lonsdale Street (north) – McCrae; Bayview Road (west) – Rosebud	Southbound exit and northbound entrance only
Mornington Peninsula	Rosebud	58.3	36.2		Jetty Road – Rosebud, Main Ridge	Roundabout; north eastbound traffic must continue via Jetty Road
Mornington Peninsula	Rosebud–Capel Sound boundary	60.1	37.3		Boneo Road (C777) – Flinders, Rosebud, Portsea	Southern terminus of freeway and route M11 at roundabout
Incomplete access; Route transition

== Gallery ==
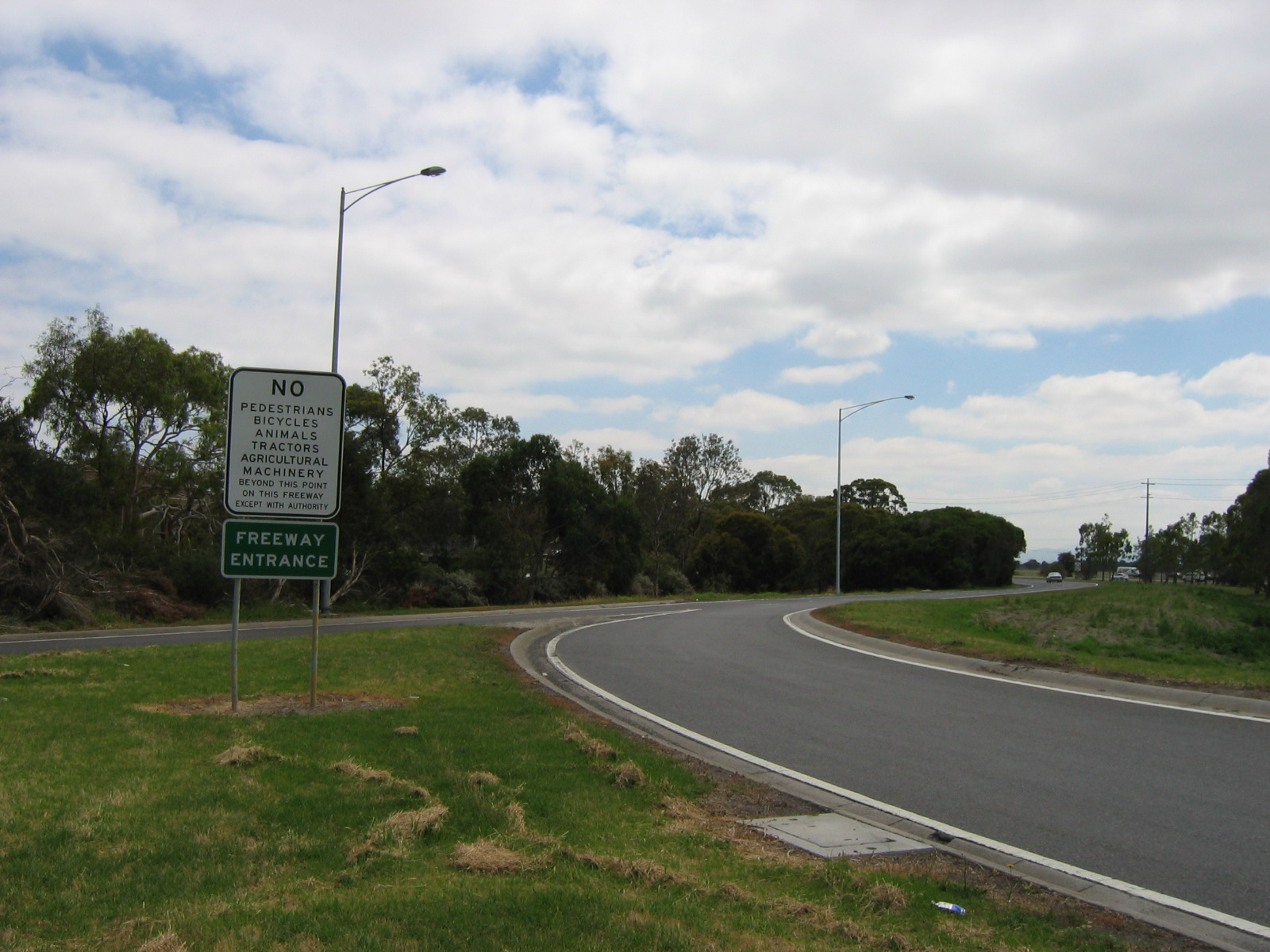
Mornington Peninsula Freeway entrance at Thompson Road

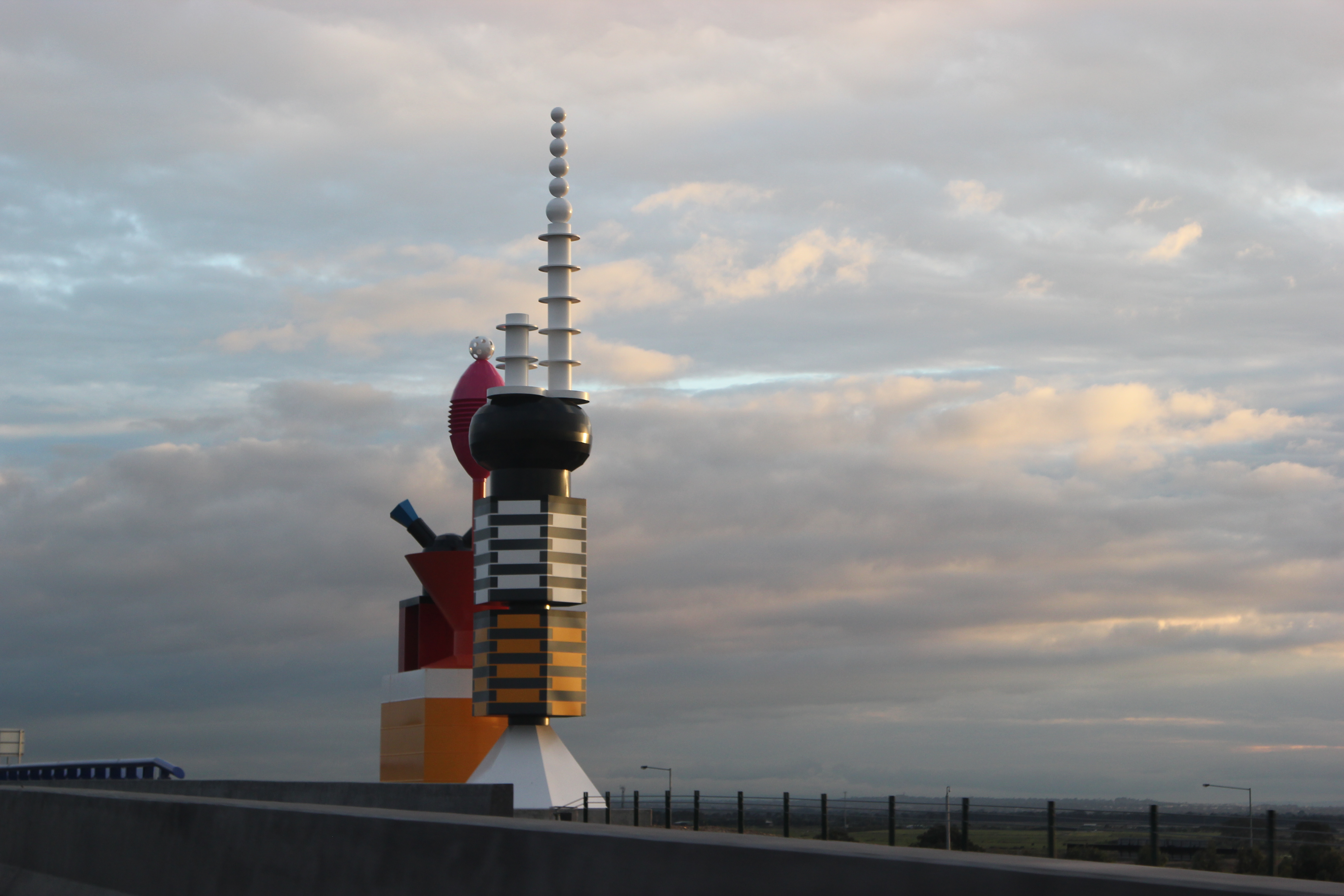
Mornington Peninsula Freeway Art Installation "Panorama Station" by Louise Paramor, (16.5 metres tall) sitting on the bridge that passes over the south end of EastLink

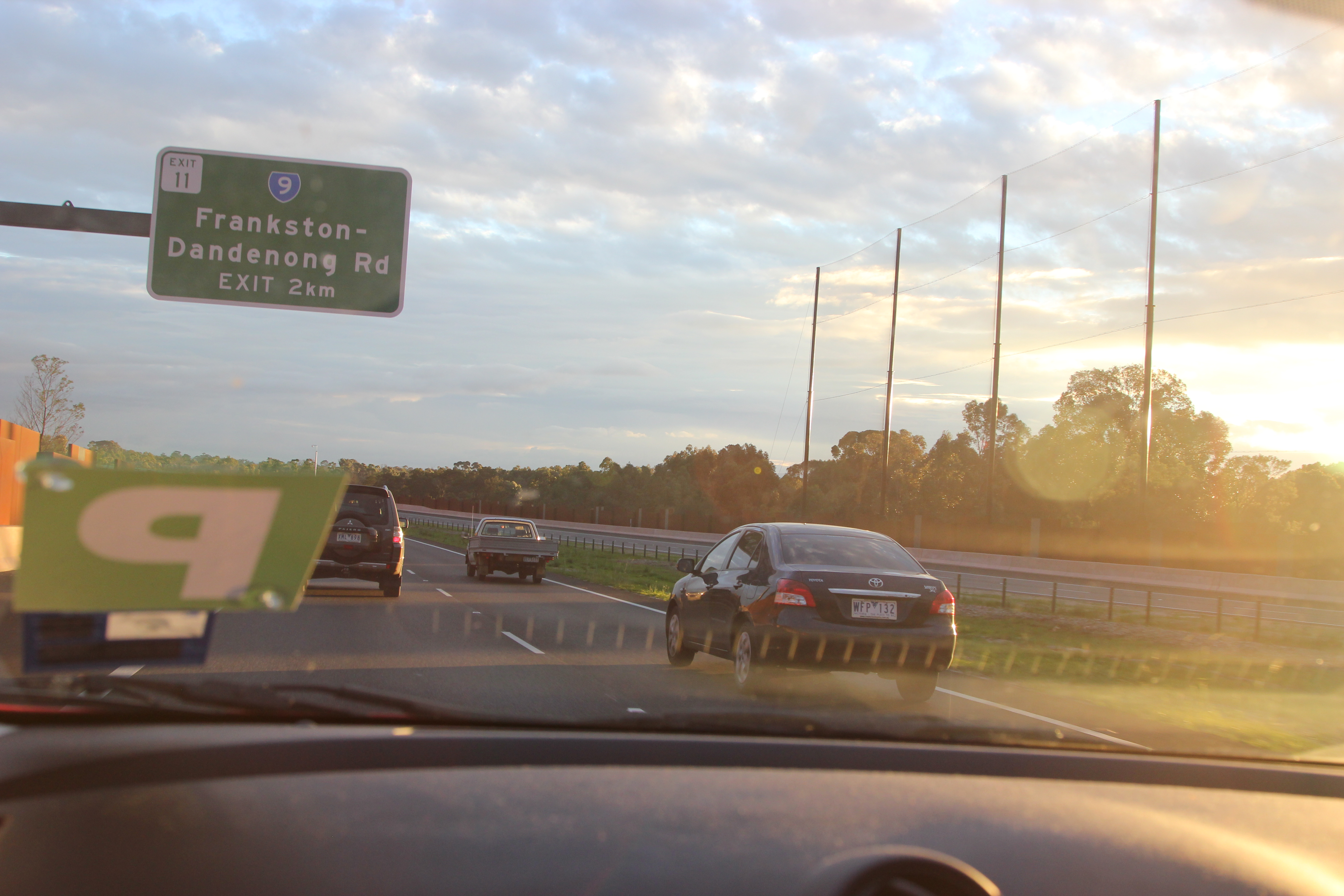
Driving northbound on Mornington Peninsula Freeway before the Frankston-Dandenong Rd Exit

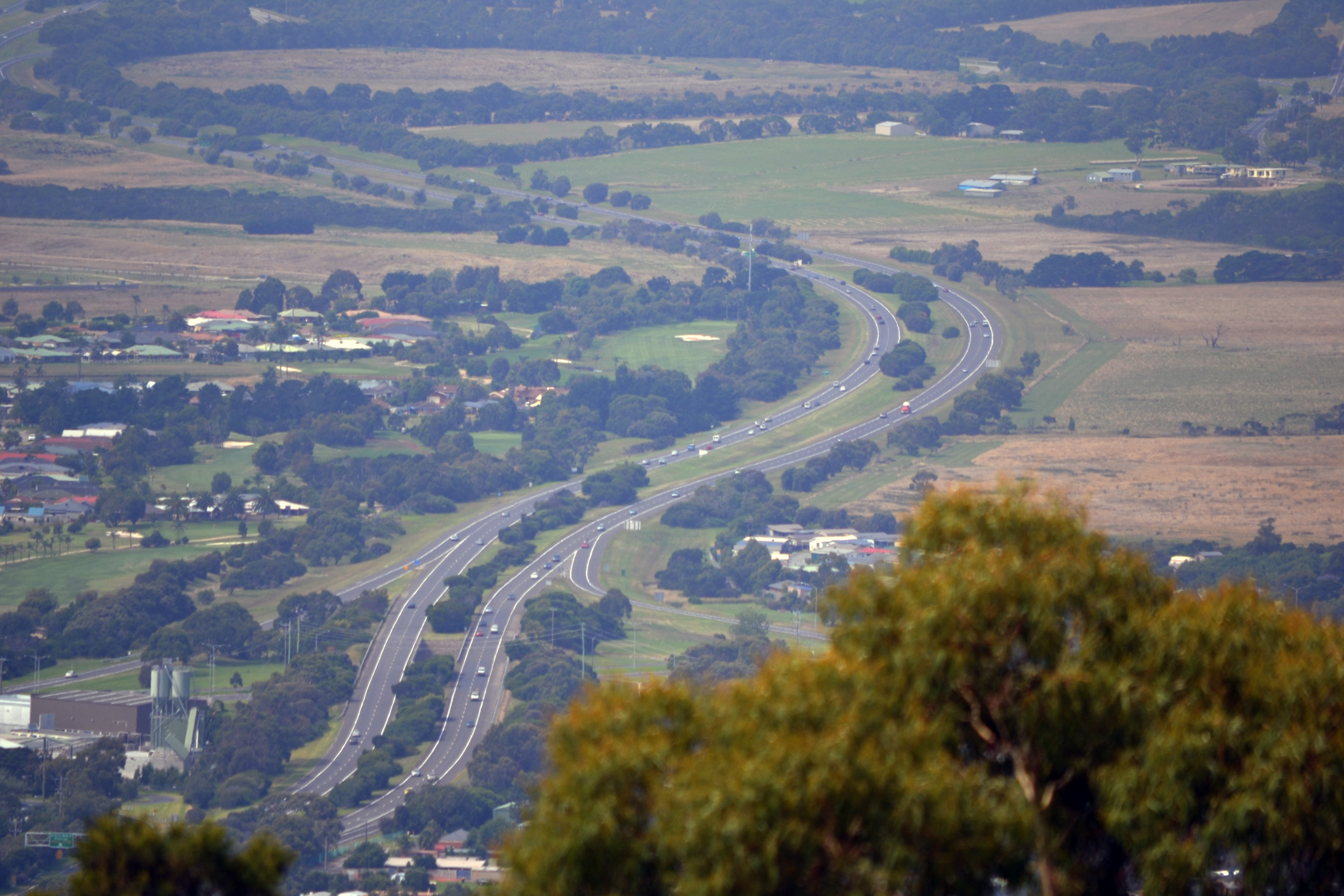
View of the Mornington Peninsula Freeway in Safety Beach, Victoria looking north

== See also ==
- List of freeways in Victoria, Australia
- Freeways in Melbourne
- Road transport in Victoria
- Freeways in Australia
