= Mornington Secondary College =

Coordinates: 38.2165°S 145.0585°E

Location
- 1051 Nepean Highway; Mornington, Victoria, 3931; Australia

Information
- Type: State, co-ed, secondary
- Motto: Inspirational Learning on the Mornington Peninsula
- Established: 1993
- Principal: Adam Slater (acting)
- Staff: 117
- Teaching staff: 91
- Grades: 7–12
- Enrolment: 1500 (2014)
- Website: www.mornsc.vic.edu.au

Mornington Secondary College is a secondary school in Mornington, Victoria, Australia serving the communities of Somerville, Tyabb, Moorooduc, Mount Martha, and Mornington on the Mornington Peninsula.

== History ==
Mornington Secondary College was established in 1993 as a dual-campus institution after a merger of Mornington Technical School and Mornington High School. The latter institution opened in 1956 in a temporary location, before moving to a new building on the corner of Nepean Highway and Wilsons Road the next year. In 1999, the two campuses were consolidated into the old Mornington Technical School; the old Mornington High School site, which by then was the junior campus, was closed and its buildings were then demolished.

== Extracurricular activities and athletics ==
The school offers Hands On Learning, The Victoria Police Youth Corp and Drum Corp, and many other extra-curricular programs to its students.

This particular college is well known for its sports swimming team, which is currently ranked at number 2 on the Australian leader boards. It was also the only state school in Victoria to compete in the state inter-school athletics competition.

== Notable alumni ==
These people either attended Mornington Secondary College or its predecessor institutions:

- Lac Edwards, player of American football
- Michelle Hamer, author and journalist
- David Larwill, visual artist
- Andrew Olle, television and radio broadcaster
- Bruce Scates, historian, academic, and novelist
- Hayden Young, Australian Football League player
- Lachie Young, Australian football league player, elder brother of Hayden Young
