= List of highways in Victoria =

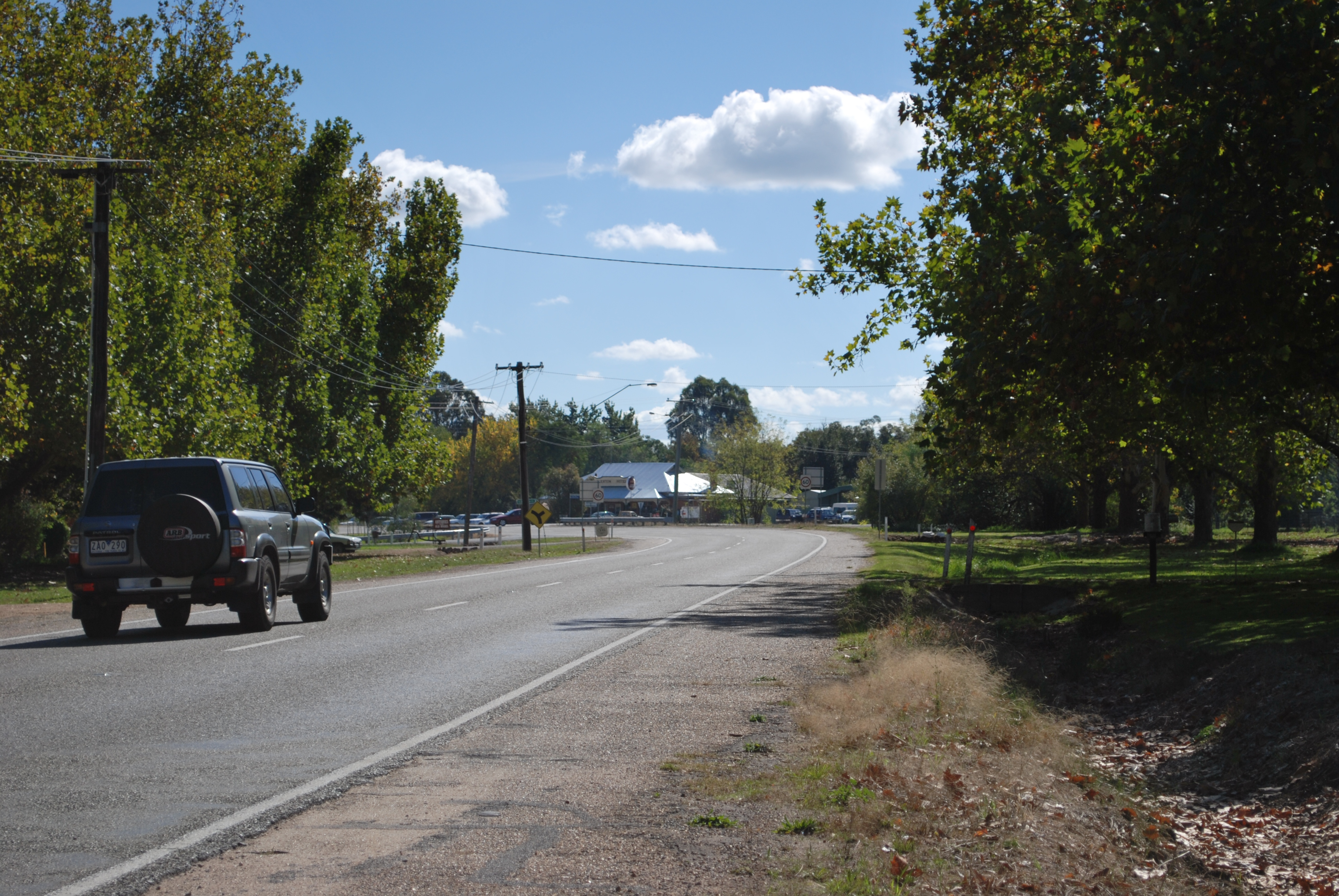
The Great Alpine Road passing through Everton, Victoria.

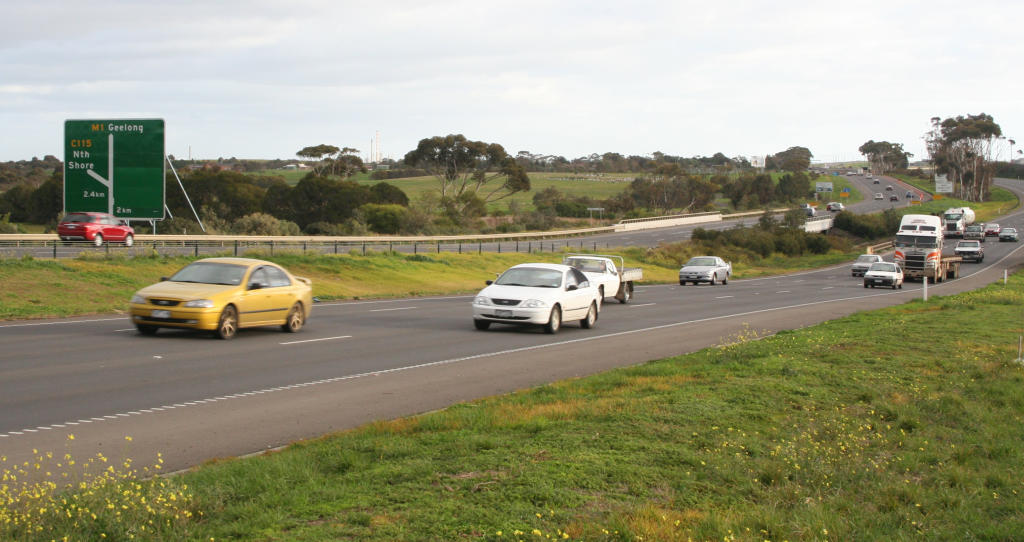
Princes Freeway at Lara

The highways in Victoria are the highest density in any state in Australia. Unlike Australia's other mainland states where vast areas are very sparsely inhabited "outback", population centres spread out over most of the state, with only the far north-west and the Victorian Alps lacking permanent settlement. Highways have therefore been built to service the population centres.

The highways generally radiate from Melbourne and other major cities and rural centres with secondary roads interconnecting the highways to each other.

Most routes have higher traffic than most other states. Highways such as Hume Highway, Western Highway, South Gippsland Highway and Princes Highway have some of the heaviest traffic in Australia.

Many of the highways are built to freeway standard ("M" freeways), while most others are generally sealed and of reasonable quality.

A register of public roads in Victoria was prepared in 2009, and the latest edition was published in 2024. An interactive map of Department of Transport and Planning (DTP) managed roads can be used to view, search and print maps of the road network.

== Numbering ==
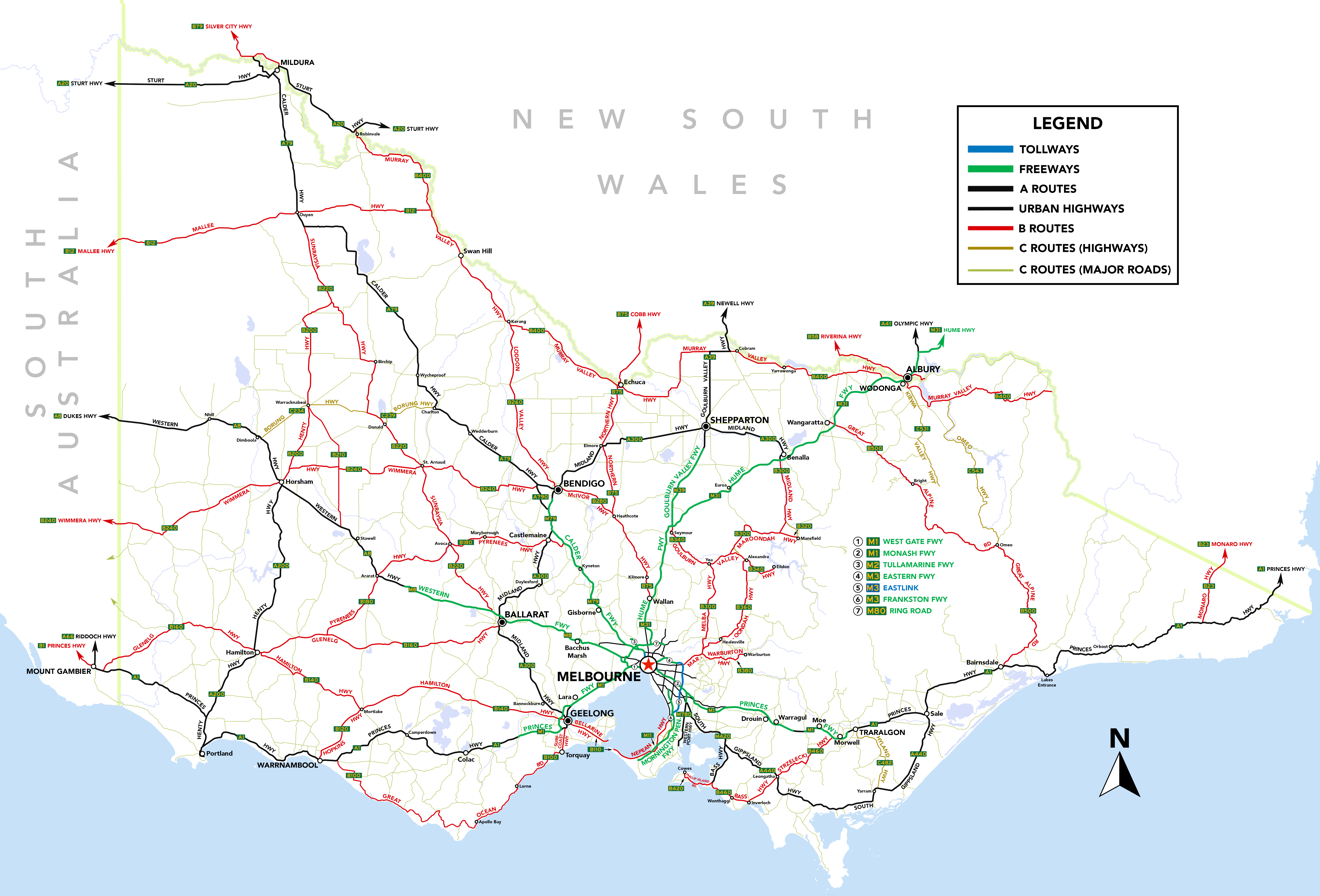
Victorian highway and road network, with significant cities and towns.

Victorian highway naming is straightforward. Most are generally named after the geographical regions and features, cities, towns and settlements along the way. Some are even more straightforward e.g. Western and Northern highways which radiate westwards and northwards from Melbourne. Notable exceptions include some interstate highways and some metropolitan highways.

The numbering system is based on "ring and spoke" system. The 'ring' highways (highways that circle Victoria) numbers are given in the multiple of hundreds e.g. Henty Highway (200), Murray Valley Highway (400) and Great Alpine Road (500) make the outermost ring. Midland Highway (300) and Maroondah Highway (300) is the inner ring.

The spokes generally inherit their original National Route numbers. Otherwise, east–west aligned highways are given even numbers and north–south are given odd numbers. Highways and primary roads are given numbers in multiple of tens. Other roads are given numbers which indicate their general alignment.

== Freeways ==
Route Marker	Roads
M1	Geelong Ring Road; Princes Freeway (west); West Gate Freeway; CityLink (southern link); Monash Freeway; Princes Freeway (east)
M2	Tullamarine Freeway; CityLink (western link)
M3	Eastern Freeway; Eastlink; Frankston Freeway
M4	West Gate Tunnel
M8	Western Freeway
M11	Mornington Peninsula Freeway
M31	Hume Freeway
M39	Goulburn Valley Freeway
M79	Calder Freeway
M80	Western Ring Road; Metropolitan Ring Road; North East Link
M780	South Gippsland Freeway

== Primary highways ==
Route Marker	Roads
A1	Princes Highway
A8	Western Highway
A10	Princes Highway
A20	Sturt Highway
A39	Goulburn Valley Highway
A79	Calder Highway
A200	Henty Highway
A300	Midland Highway
A420	Bass Highway
A440 A21	South Gippsland Highway
A780	Western Port Highway

== Secondary highways ==
Route Marker	Roads
B12	Mallee Highway
B23	Monaro Highway
B75	Northern Highway
B100	Great Ocean Road; Surf Coast Highway
B110	Bellarine Highway; Nepean Highway
B120	Hopkins Highway
B140	Hamilton Highway
B160	Glenelg Highway
B180	Pyrenees Highway
B200	Henty Highway
B220	Sunraysia Highway
B240	Wimmera Highway
B260	Loddon Valley Highway
B280	McIvor Highway
B300	Goulburn Valley Highway; Maroondah Highway; Melba Highway; Midland Highway
B320	Maroondah Highway
B340	Goulburn Valley Highway; Maroondah Highway
B360	Maroondah Highway
B380	Warburton Highway
B400	Murray Valley Highway
B420	Phillip Island Road
B460	Bass Highway; Strzelecki Highway
B500	Great Alpine Road

== Tertiary highways ==
Route Marker	Roads
C119	Skenes Creek Rd
C141	Ballan–Daylesford Road; Geelong–Ballan Road
C155	Colac–Lavers Hill Rd
C157	Lighthouse Rd
C159	Beech Forest–Lavers Hill Rd
C162	Timboon–Port Campbell Rd
C166	Princetown Rd
C234	Borung Highway
C239	Borung Highway
C412	Burwood Highway
C444	Wilsons Promontory Rd
C482	Hyland Highway
C524	Buckland Gap Rd
C531	Kiewa Valley Highway
C536	Tawonga Gap Rd
C543	Omeo Highway
C605	Swan Reach Rd
C704	Bacchus Marsh Rd
C754	Melton Highway
C777 C784	Moorooduc Highway

== Urban highways ==
Route Marker	Roads
State Route 8	Western Highway
State Route 9	Dandenong Valley Highway
State Route 10	State (Lower Dandenong/Cheltenham) Highway
State Route 15	Warrigal Highway
State Route 21	Chandler Highway
State Route 26	Burwood Highway
State Route 27	Plenty Valley Highway
State Route 28	Mountain Highway
State Route 29	Hoddle Highway
State Route 34	Maroondah Highway
State Route 40	State (Bell/Springvale) Highway
State Route 55	Hume Highway

In addition, several metropolitan roads have been given highway designation, mainly in Melbourne. For details see List of highways in Melbourne

== See also ==
- Highways in Australia for highways in other states and territories
- List of highways in Australia for roads named as highways, but not necessarily classified as highways
- Road transport in Victoria
