= Bobby Monk =

Australian rules footballer

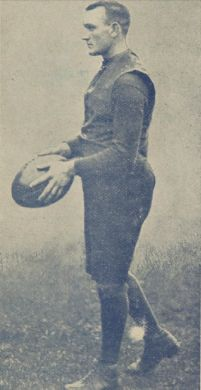

Personal information
- Full name: Miles Alexander Monk
- Born: 22 October 1885; Tyabb, Victoria
- Died: 19 January 1937 (aged 51); The Alfred Hospital, Prahran, Victoria
- Original team: Ferntree Gully
- Height: 174 cm (5 ft 9 in)
- Weight: 71 kg (157 lb)
- Position: Defender

Playing career^{1}
| Years | Club | Games (Goals) |
| 1907–14 | Melbourne | 125 (15) |
- ^{1} Playing statistics correct to the end of 1914.

Miles Alexander "Bobby" Monk (22 October 1885 – 19 January 1937) was an Australian rules footballer who played with Melbourne in the Victorian Football League (VFL).

He later served in France during World War I.
