= Moorooduc Highway =

Highway in Australia

Moorooduc Highway McMahons Road Frankston–Flinders Road Moorooduc Road Victoria

General information
- Type: Highway
- Length: 16 km (9.9 mi)
- Route number(s): C777 (2013–present) (Frankston–Frankston South); C784 (2013–present) (Frankston South–Tuerong)
- Former route number: Metro Route 11 (1965–2013) Entire route; Metro Route 67 (1989–1998) (Frankston–Frankston South)
- Tourist routes: Tourist Route 12 (through Frankston)

Major junctions
- North end: Frankston Freeway; Frankston, Melbourne
- Cranbourne–Frankston Road; Hastings Road; Golf Links Road; Frankston–Flinders Road; Sages Road; Mornington–Tyabb Road; Mornington Peninsula Freeway
- South end: Old Moorooduc Road; Tuerong, Melbourne

Location(s)
- Major settlements: Frankston South, Baxter, Moorooduc

Highway system
- Highways in Australia; National Highway • Freeways in Australia; Highways in Victoria

Moorooduc Highway is a 16 km highway which runs from Frankston to Tuerong and, together with the Mornington Peninsula Freeway, was part of the main route from Melbourne to the Mornington Peninsula until the completion of Peninsula Link in 2013. This name is not widely known to most drivers, as the entire allocation is still best known as by the names of its constituent parts: McMahons Road, Frankston–Flinders Road, and Moorooduc Road.

== Route ==
McMahons Road (and the beginning of the highway) starts at the southern end of the Frankston Freeway and heads south as a six-lane, dual-carriageway road through the central suburbs of Frankston, crossing the Stony Point railway line until it intersects with and changes name to Frankston-Flinders Road. It continues south through Frankston South until it meets and continues south along Moorooduc Road as a four-lane dual-carriageway road through Moorooduc, before the road and the end of the highway) ends at the interchange where Peninsula Link and the southern section of the Mornington Peninsula Freeway meet. It is a notoriously dangerous stretch of road that has claimed many lives due to speed and uncontrolled intersections. Roundabouts have recently been installed at the Bentons Road, Eramosa Road and Bungower Road intersections. The Sages Road intersection is now controlled by traffic lights after numerous fatal and serious accidents at this high speed T-intersection. Heading southbound from Humphries Road in Baxter, the speed limit increases from 80 km/h to 90 km/h, and from Sumner Road, it reaches 100 km/h.

== History ==
Moorooduc Road was duplicated to just south of Sages Road in the 1970s, and during the 1980s the rest of the road was duplicated to Tuerong, to serve as an alternative to building a Frankston Bypass. The road was eventually linked directly to the southern part of Mornington Peninsula Freeway when it was extended to Tuerong in 1994.

Moorooduc Highway (as its constituent roads) was allocated Metropolitan Route 11 from Frankston to Baxter in 1965; it was extended further south along Moorooduc Road and eventually onto the southern sections of the Mornington Peninsula Freeway in 1989, shifting from Moorooduc Road to the freeway when it was extended further north to Tuerong in 1994. With Victoria's conversion to the newer alphanumeric system in the late 1990s, Metropolitan Route 11 was replaced by route C777 between Frankston and Frankston South, and route C784 between Frankston South and Tuerong, when Peninsula Link opened in 2013 (and was itself allocated route M11).

The passing of the Transport Act 1983 (itself an evolution from the original Highways and Vehicles Act 1924) provided for the declaration of State Highways, roads two-thirds financed by the state government through the Road Construction Authority (later VicRoads). The Moorooduc Highway was declared a State Highway in March 1990, from the Frankston Freeway along McMahons Road and Frankston-Flinders Road in Frankston through Frankston South, and Moorooduc Road to Tuerong. However all roads were known (and signposted) as their constituent parts.

The passing of the Road Management Act 2004 granted the responsibility of overall management and development of Victoria's major arterial roads to VicRoads: in 2004, VicRoads declared this road as the Mornington Peninsula Route (previously Arterial #6600), then re-declared it in late 2012 as Moorooduc Highway (Arterial #6860), beginning from the Frankston Freeway in Frankston and ending at the interchange where Peninsula Link and Mornington Peninsula Freeway meet in Tuerong. While the road is still presently known (and signposted) as its constituent parts, signs replaced along Moorooduc Road since the opening of Peninsula Link have been prominently renamed as Moorooduc Highway. The section of Moorooduc Road south of Tuerong was renamed Old Moorooduc Road.

=== Peninsula Link (Frankston Bypass) ===
Moorooduc Highway initially acted as an arterial road link between the northern and southern sections of the Mornington Peninsula Freeway; since Peninsula Link opened to traffic in 18 January 2013, Moorooduc Highway now carries local traffic, while Peninsula Link primarily carries through traffic and bypasses congested roundabout intersections near Mornington as well as the intersections through Frankston, improving traffic flow in these areas.

== Major intersections ==
| Location | km | mi | Destinations | Notes |
|---|---|---|---|---|
| Frankston | 0.0 | 0.0 | Frankston Freeway (M3) – Dandenong, Melbourne | |
| Frankston | 0.2 | 0.12 | Cranbourne–Frankston Road (Metro Route 4/Tourist Route 12) – Cranbourne, Frankston | Northbound-eastbound traffic must turn left and U-turn from the left at next signals |
| Frankston | | | Hastings Road (Tourist Route 12) – Frankston | Concurrency with Tourist Route 12 |
| Frankston South | | | Golf Links Road (Tourist Route 12) – Langwarrin South | Concurrency with Tourist Route 12 |
| Frankston South | | | Frankston–Flinders Road (C777) – Hastings, Flinders | |
| Frankston South–Baxter boundary | | | Sages Road (C781) – Baxter, Tooradin | |
| Mount Eliza–Moorooduc boundary | | | Eramosa Road West | |
| Mornington–Mount Eliza–Moorooduc tripoint | | | Wooralla Drive | |
| Mornington–Moorooduc boundary | | | Bungower Road | |
| Mornington–Moorooduc boundary | | | Mornington–Tyabb Road (C782) – Mornington, Tyabb | |
| Mornington–Mount Martha–Moorooduc tripoint | | | Bentons Road | |
| Mount Martha–Moorooduc boundary | | | Craigie Road – Mount Martha | |
| Tuerong–Mount Martha–Moorooduc tripoint | | | Mornington Peninsula Freeway (M11) – Melbourne, Portsea | |
| Tuerong–Mount Martha–Moorooduc tripoint | | | Old Moorooduc Road (C784) – Balnarring | |
Incomplete access; Route transition

== See also ==
- List of Melbourne highways
