= Frankston Freeway =

Freeway in Victoria

Frankston Freeway Victoria
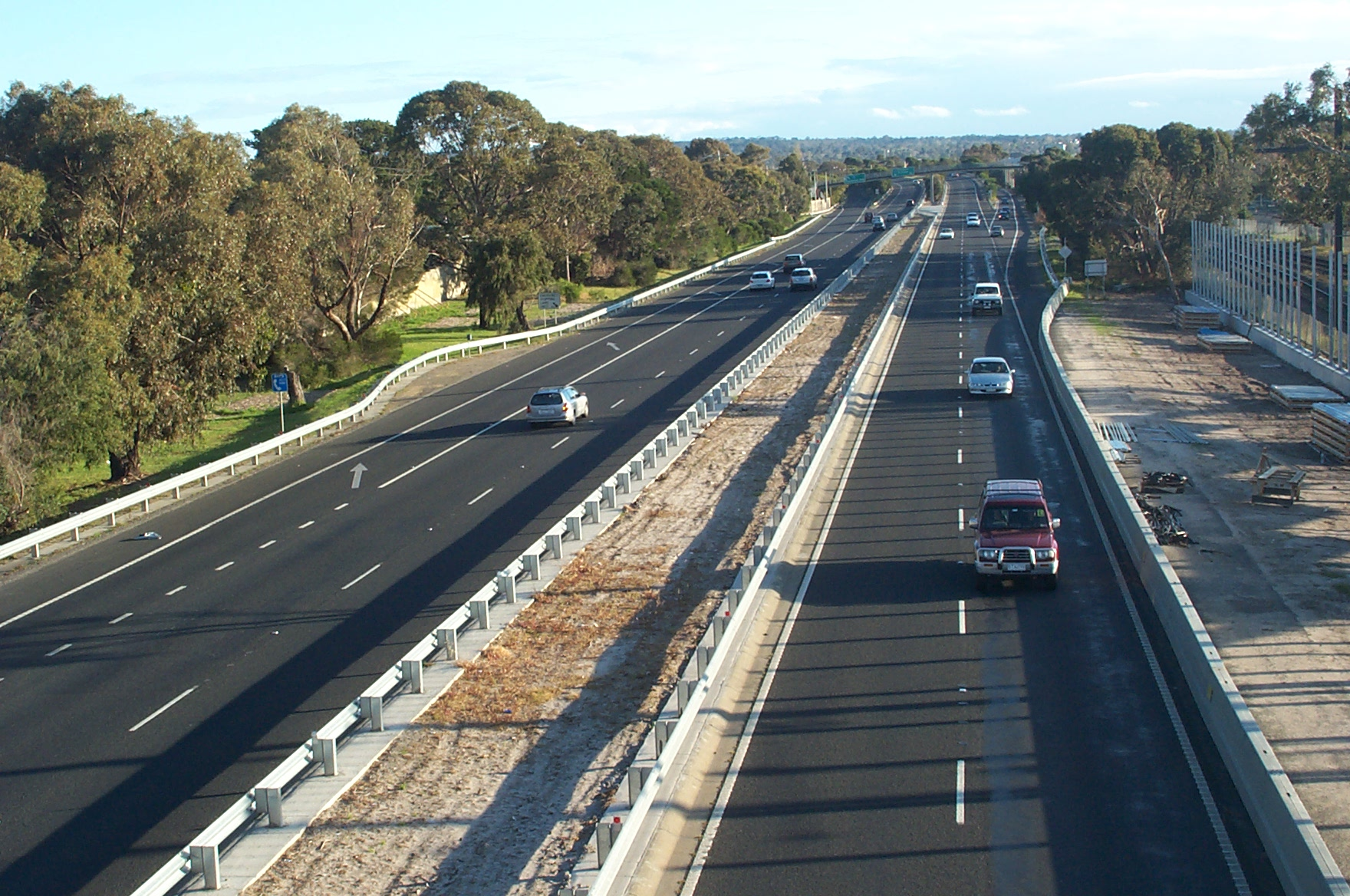
- Upgraded section of Frankston Freeway near EastLink
- Coordinates: 38.097424°S 145.145176°E (North end); 38.145221°S 145.136335°E (South end)

General information
- Type: Freeway
- Length: 7.1 km (4.4 mi)
- Opened: 1962–1974
- Route number(s): M3 (2013–present)
- Former route number: Metro Route 11 (1965–2013)

Major junctions
- North end: EastLink; Seaford, Melbourne
- Mornington Peninsula Freeway; Frankston-Dandenong Road
- South end: McMahons Road; Frankston, Melbourne

Location(s)
- LGA(s): City of Frankston
- Major suburbs: Seaford, Frankston

Highway system
- Highways in Australia; National Highway • Freeways in Australia; Highways in Victoria

Frankston Freeway is a short freeway in southern Melbourne, Australia initially designed as a bypass of central Frankston and later incorporating a freeway-style upgrade to Wells Road in the 1970s, acting as a link from suburban Melbourne to Frankston's eastern suburbs.

Frankston Freeway became mostly used by local traffic (through traffic exiting EastLink onto Peninsula Link and vice versa) as an express link in and out of Frankston, the largest city near the Mornington Peninsula, bypassing other congested arterial roads linking Frankston to the rest of suburban Melbourne. Frankston Freeway connects with three other urban freeways: the EastLink tollway, Mornington Peninsula Freeway (northern section) and Peninsula Link.

== Route ==
Frankston Freeway begins at the interchange with the northern section of Mornington Peninsula Freeway, Peninsula Link and EastLink in Carrum Downs, and heads south through Seaford parallel to the Frankston railway line until Frankston-Dandenong Road, veering south-east to terminate within the alignment of McMahons Road just south of Beach Street in the eastern suburbs of Frankston. The Eastlink tollway connects directly to its northern end, providing a freeway-standard road from Frankston north through the eastern suburbs of Melbourne.

Frankston Freeway has subsumed most of the former Wells Road alignment through Seaford to Klauer Street, and was originally designed to accommodate the northern section of Mornington Peninsula Freeway. Until 2013, Mornington Peninsula Freeway had a missing section (intended to bypass suburban Frankston) for decades - now built as Peninsula Link - and at the time Frankston Freeway (and later Moorooduc Highway) served as part of the missing link between the two sections of Mornington Peninsula Freeway.

== History ==
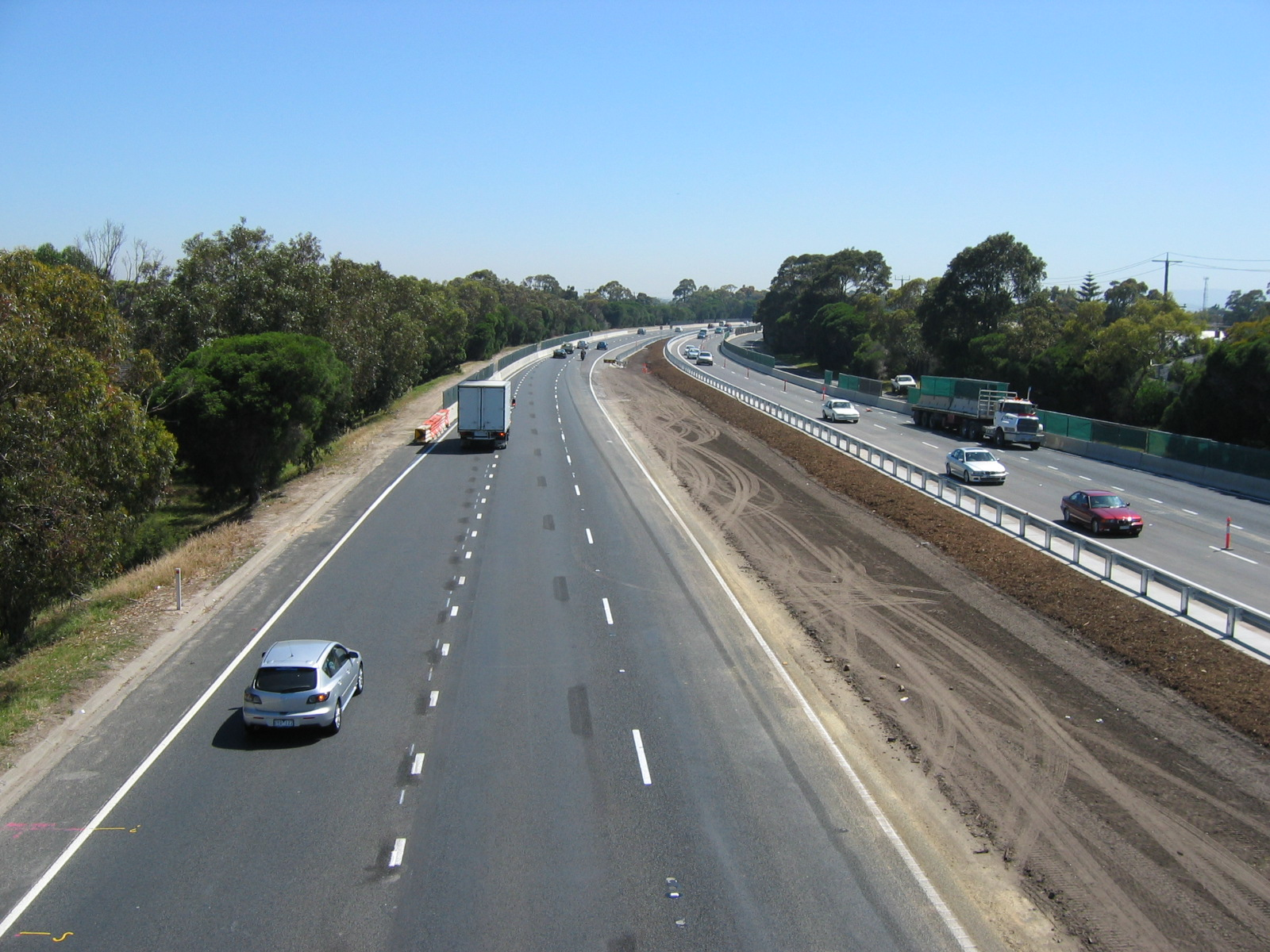
Frankston Freeway in November 2007

Plans for an undivided highway between Seaford Road and Cranbourne-Frankston Road around Frankston had existed since 1950, and had become known as the Frankston By-pass Road after its initial stages were constructed in the early 1960s, connecting with Wells Road and continuing on to Mordialloc. The Frankston By-pass Road was renamed to Frankston Freeway, upgraded to freeway standard and extended further north in the early 1970s.

Frankston By-pass Road was signed Metropolitan Route 11 in 1965, re-routed from Wells Road when replacement stages of Frankston Freeway opened during the 1970s. With Victoria's conversion to the newer alphanumeric system in the late 1990s, Metropolitan Route 11 was replaced with route M3 when Peninsula Link opened in 2013.

The passing of the Road Management Act 2004 granted the responsibility of overall management and development of Victoria's major arterial roads to VicRoads: in 2012, VicRoads re-declared Frankston Freeway (Freeway #1840) between Mornington Peninsula Freeway in Carrum Downs and end at the ramps to Beach Street in Frankston.

The freeway has previously been congested in holiday months due to the then-missing section of Mornington Peninsula Freeway: since the construction of that section (Peninsula Link) in 2013, through traffic has reduced immensely on the Frankston Freeway.

=== Timeline of construction ===
- 1960/61 – Frankston By-pass Road, 4,600 feet (1.4 km) between William Street (today Klauer Street) and Frankston-Dandenong Road, opened as a two-lane single-carriageway road, at a cost of A£22,500.
- 1962/63 – Frankston By-pass Road, extended 1.2 miles (1.9 km) from Frankston-Dandenong Road to Beach Street opened, as a two-lane single-carriageway road, with grade separation at Beach Street.
- 1970 – Frankston Freeway, 2 miles (3.2 km) of second carriageway between Klauer Street and Frankston-Cranbourne Road, opened December 1970.
- 1971/72 – Frankston Freeway, elimination of last at-grade intersection with overpass of Frankston-Dandenong Road completed during 1971/72 financial year, at a cost of A$556,000
- 1973 – Extended 1.5 miles (2.4 km) with dual carriageways and at-grade intersections north of Klauer Street to Armstrongs Road, completed early 1973.
- 1974 – Seaford Road interchange opened early 1974, and Klauer Street overpass completed December 1974.

The first stage of the northern section of Mornington Peninsula Freeway - a 2km section from Armstrongs Road to Eel Race Drain - connecting to the northern end of Frankston Freeway, was opened in November 1976.

== Exits and interchanges ==
Frankston Freeway is entirely contained within the City of Frankston local government area.

Location	km	mi	Destinations	Notes
Seaford	0.0	0.0	EastLink (M3 northeast) – Ringwood, Clifton Hill, City	Northern freeway terminus: continues northeast as EastLink
Seaford	0.0	0.0	Mornington Peninsula Freeway (M11 north) – Dingley Village	Northbound exit to and southbound entrance from M11
Seaford	0.0	0.0	Rutherford Road (B664) – Carrum Downs	Southbound exit only
Seaford	2.9	1.8	Seaford Road – Skye, Seaford	
Seaford–Frankston boundary	5.2	3.2	Frankston-Dandenong Road (Metro Route 9) – Dandenong, Frankston	Southbound entry via Skye Road
Frankston	6.9	4.3	Beach Street – Frankston	Northbound exit and southbound entrance only
Frankston	7.1	4.4	McMahons Road (C777 south) – Somerville, Hastings	Southern freeway terminus; continues south as McMahons Road
Incomplete access; Route transition

== See also ==
- Freeways in Australia
- Freeways in Melbourne
- Road transport in Victoria
