= Road infrastructure in Melbourne =

This is a list of highways in Melbourne, Australia. Some of these highways are bona-fide, connecting Melbourne to other towns and settlements, some of which have been later swallowed by Melbourne growth. However others are former streets designated as highways (particularly in VicRoads documentation) to highlight their importance as links between highways and freeways.

== Current highways ==
- Burwood Highway (State Route 26/C412) (Toorak Road, Monbulk Road)
- Chandler Highway (State Route 21)
- Dandenong Valley Highway (State Route 9) (Stud Road, Dandenong–Frankston Road)
- Docklands Highway (State Routes 30/32/35/50/55) (Francis Street, Whitehall Street, Footscray Road, Wurundjeri Way)
- Eastern Highway (State Route 46/83) (Alexandra Parade)
- Greensborough Highway (State Route 46)
- Maroondah Highway (Whitehorse Road) (State Route 34/B300/B360)
- Melba Highway (B300)
- Melton Highway (C754)
- Moorooduc Highway (C777/C784) (McMahons Road, Frankston–Flinders Road)
- Mountain Highway (State Route 28)
- Nepean Highway (State Route 3/B110) (St Kilda Road, Brighton Road, Point Nepean Road)
- Princes Highway:
  - Princes Highway West (State Routes 8/83) (Geelong Road, Ballarat Road, Smithfield Road, Racecourse Road)
  - Princes Highway East (National Alternative Route 1/C101)
- South Gippsland Highway (A21/B21)
- Sydney Road (Hume Highway) (State Route 55)
- Warburton Highway (B380)
- Western Highway (State Route 8/M8) (Ballarat Road)
- Western Port Highway (M780/A780) (Dandenong–Hastings Road)

== Named but not signed ==
Highways declared in VicRoads manuals, but not signed accordingly:

- Bulleen Highway (State Route 52), signed as Bulleen Road
- Hoddle Highway (State Route 29), signed as Hoddle Street, Punt Road, Barkly Street
- Plenty Valley Highway (State Routes 21/27/48), signed as Albert Street, Plenty Road
- State (Bell/Springvale) Highway (State Routes 40/36/47), signed as Bell Street, Banksia Street, Manningham Road, Williamsons Road, Doncaster Road, Mitcham Road, Springvale Road, Edithvale Road
- State (St Georges) Highway (State Route 45), signed as St Georges Road
- State (Lower Dandenong/Cheltenham) Highway (State Route 10), signed as Lower Dandenong Road, Cheltenham Road, Foster Street
- Warrigal Highway (State Route 15), signed as Warrigal Road
- Yarra Bank Highway (State Route 20), signed as Power Street, City Road, Alexandra Avenue, Olympic Boulevard

== Former highways ==
- Grieve Highway, renamed Grieve Parade (State Route 39)
- Monash Highway (State Route 18), name decommissioned upon opening of Monash Freeway, signed as North Road and Wellington Road
