= State (Lower Dandenong/Cheltenham) Highway =

State (Lower Dandenong/Cheltenham) Highway Lower Dandenong Road, Cheltenham Road Victoria
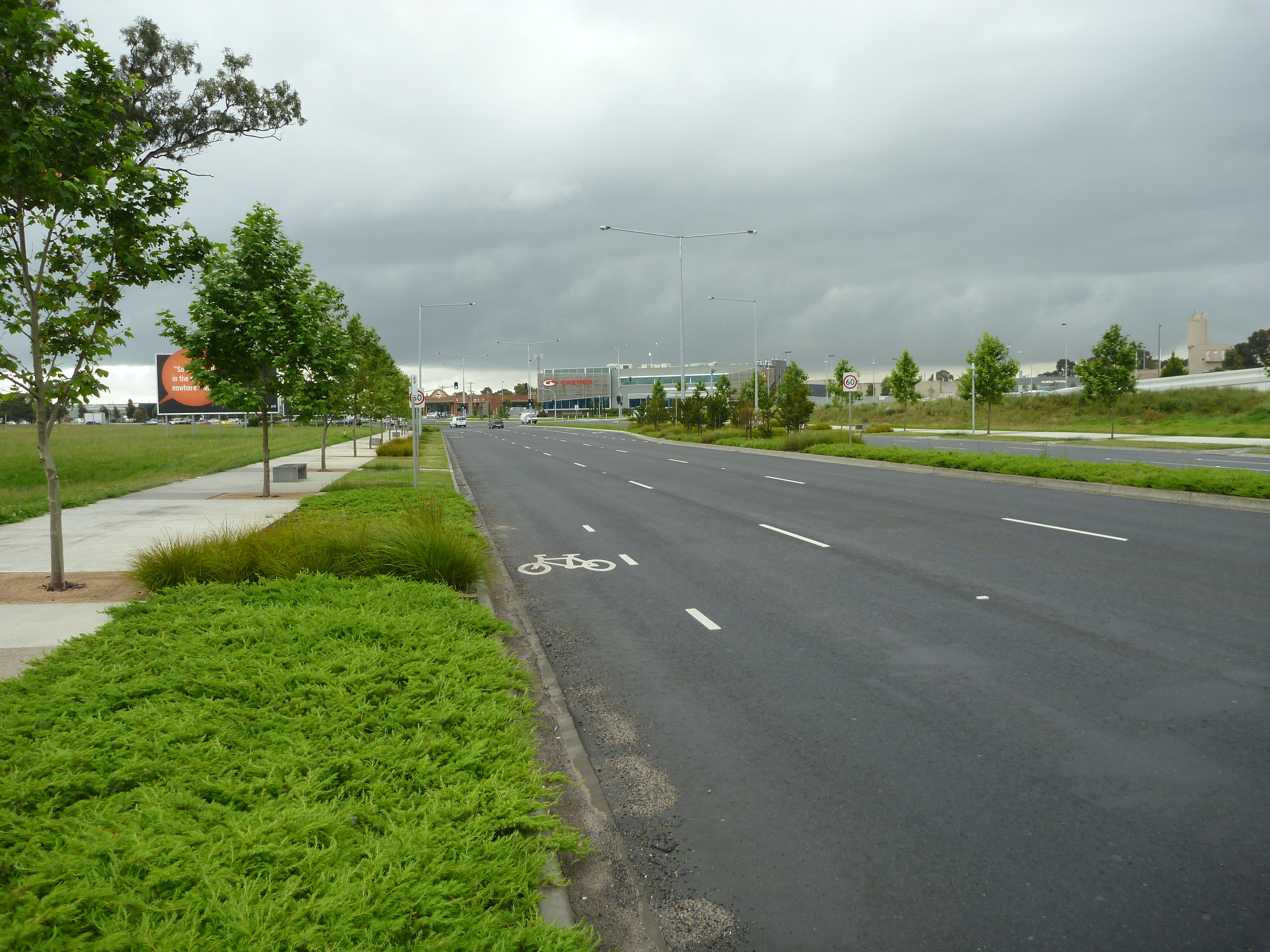
- Cheltenham Road, Dandenong
- Coordinates: 37.982596°S 145.074167°E (West end); 37.991886°S 145.215546°E (East end)

General information
- Type: Highway
- Length: 12.7 km (7.9 mi)
- Gazetted: December 1913 (as Main Road); December 1990 (as State Highway)
- Route number(s): Metro Route 10 (1965–present)

Major junctions
- West end: Nepean Highway; Mentone, Melbourne
- Mornington Peninsula Freeway; Springvale Road; EastLink
- East end: Lonsdale Street; Dandenong, Melbourne

Location(s)
- Major settlements: Parkdale, Braeside, Dingley Village, Keysborough

Highway system
- Highways in Australia; National Highway • Freeways in Australia; Highways in Victoria

State (Lower Dandenong/Cheltenham) Highway (after its constituent parts), is a major arterial road in the southeastern suburbs of Melbourne, Australia. These names are not widely known to most drivers, as the entire allocation is still best known as by the names of its constituent parts: Lower Dandenong Road and Cheltenham Road.

== Route ==
Lower Dandenong Road (and the beginning of the highway) starts at the interchange with Nepean Highway, Mentone, and heads east as a four-lane single-carriageway road until it meets Boundary Road in Braeside, where it widens into a four-lane, dual-carriageway road and continues east, widening again into a six-lane, dual-carriageway highway past the full diamond interchange with Mornington Peninsula Freeway, continuing east until it reaches the intersection with Springvale Road. As Cheltenham Road it continues east through Keysborough past the half diamond interchange with EastLink, until it meets Hammond Road in Dandenong, where it narrows back into a four-lane, dual-carriageway road, crosses under the Pakenham and Cranbourne railway lines before it (and the end of the highway) ends at the intersection with Lonsdale Street in Dandenong.

== History ==
The passing of the Country Roads Act 1912 through the Parliament of Victoria provided for the establishment of the Country Roads Board (later VicRoads) and their ability to declare Main Roads, taking responsibility for the management, construction and care of the state's major roads from local municipalities. Cheltenham Road was declared a Main Road on 1 December 1913, from Dandenong through Keysborough to Dingley Village.

The passing of the Country Roads Act 1958 (itself an evolution from the original Highways and Vehicles Act 1924) provided for the declaration of State Highways, roads two-thirds financed by the state government through the Country Roads Board. Lower Dandenong Road was declared a Main Road on 9 May 1983, from the intersection with Nepean Highway in Mentone to meet Cheltenham Road in Keysborough.

The passing of the Transport Act 1983 updated the definition of State Highways. State Highway (Lower Dandenong Road, Cheltenham Road) was declared a State Highway by VicRoads in December 1990, from Nepean Highway in Mentone to Lonsdale Street in Dandenong, subsuming the original declarations of Lower Dandenong Road, and Cheltenham Road between Keysborough and Dandenong, as Main Roads; the route was known (and signposted) as its constituent parts.

The route (as its constituent roads) was allocated Metropolitan Route 10 between Mentone and Dandenong in 1965, continuing west beyond Nepean Highway along entire length of Balcombe Road to Black Rock.

The passing of the Road Management Act 2004 granted the responsibility of overall management and development of Victoria's major arterial roads to VicRoads: in 2004, VicRoads re-declared the road as State (Lower Dandenong/Cheltenham) Highway (Arterial #6050), from Nepean Highway in Mentone to Lonsdale Street in Dandenong, however the road is still presently known (and signposted) as its constituent parts.

The eastern end of the highway through Dandenong was re-routed as part of the Level Crossing Removal Project: originally turning north under the railway lines to meet Foster Street and terminate at the intersection with Lonsdale Street in central Dandenong, a new alignment extending 450m east was constructed, with a new underpass under the railway line with increased 5.4m clearance (as the old one was limited to 3.8m clearance, heavy or oversized traffic was sent via Hammond Road and Webster Street), to meet Lonsdale Street directly at a new intersection just north of Dandenong Creek; this also allowed the Webster Street level crossing to be removed in late 2025. The new extension was opened 22 September 2026.

== Major intersections ==
LGA	Location	km	mi	Destinations	Notes
Kingston	Mentone–Parkdale boundary	0.0	0.0	Nepean Highway (Metro Routes 3/10 west, Metro Route 3 southeast) – Frankston, City	Western terminus of highway Western end of Lower Dandenong Road; Metro Route 10 continues west along Nepean Highway to Balcombe Road
Kingston	Moorabbin Airport–Braeside–Dingley Village–Mordialloc quadripoint	3.1	1.9	Boundary Road (Metro Route 23) – Doncaster, Clayton, Aspendale	
Kingston	Braeside–Dingley Village boundary	3.9	2.4	Mornington Peninsula Freeway (M11) – Dingley Village, Frankston, Rosebud	Diamond interchange Northbound exit via Woodlands Drive
Kingston	Braeside–Dingley Village boundary	6.0	3.7	Centre Dandenong Road – Dingley Village, Cheltenham	
Kingston–Greater Dandenong boundary	Keysborough–Braeside–Dingley Village tripoint	6.3	3.9	Springvale Road (Metro Route 40) – Donvale, Springvale, Edithvale	Eastern end of Lower Dandenong Road; Western end of Cheltenham Road
Greater Dandenong	Keysborough	10.5	6.5	EastLink (M3) – Ringwood	Half diamond interchange, northbound entrance and southbound exit only
Greater Dandenong	Dandenong	12.5	7.8	Pakenham and Cranbourne railway lines	
Greater Dandenong	Dandenong	12.7	7.9	Lonsdale Street (Alt National Route 1/Metro Route 9) – Caulfield, Oakleigh, Berwick, City	Eastern terminus of highway and Metro Route 10; Eastern end of Cheltenham Road
1.000 mi = 1.609 km; 1.000 km = 0.621 mi: Incomplete access; Route transition

== See also ==
List of Melbourne highways
