= Dandenong Valley Highway =

Highway in Victoria

Dandenong Valley Highway Stud Road, Foster Street, Frankston–Dandenong Road Victoria
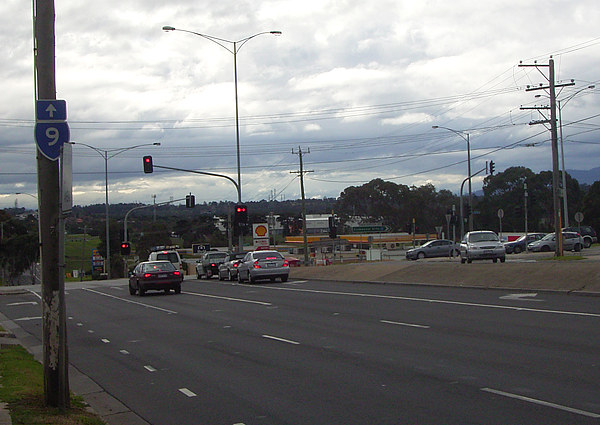
- Heatherton Road and Stud Road, Dandenong
- Coordinates: 37.84399°S 145.248312°E (North end); 38.13876°S 145.12344°E (South end)

General information
- Type: Highway
- Length: 32.2 km (20 mi)
- Gazetted: December 1918 (as Developmental Road); March 1990 (as State Highway)
- Route number(s): Metro Route 9 (1965–present); Concurrency: Alt National Route 1 (1988–present) (through Dandenong)
- Former route number: Concurrency: National Route 1 (1955–1988) (through Dandenong)

Major junctions
- North end: Stud Road; Wantirna South, Melbourne
- Burwood Highway; Monash Freeway; Princes Highway; Mornington Peninsula Freeway; Frankston Freeway
- South end: Dandenong Road West; Frankston, Melbourne

Location(s)
- Major suburbs: Scoresby, Rowville, Dandenong, Carrum Downs

Highway system
- Highways in Australia; National Highway • Freeways in Australia; Highways in Victoria

Dandenong Valley Highway is an urban highway stretching over 30 kilometres from Bayswater in Melbourne's eastern suburbs to Frankston in the south. This name covers many consecutive streets and is not widely known to most drivers, as the entire allocation is still best known as by the names of its constituent parts: Stud Road, Foster Street and Dandenong-Frankston Road.

The traffic on the highway has been significant over the years with the worst bottlenecks at Burwood Highway, Ferntree Gully Road, Wellington Road, Princes Highway, and Thompsons Road, but since the opening of the EastLink, the traffic burden has significantly reduced along the highway with the north–south tollway, opening to traffic on 29 June 2008.

== Route ==
Dandenong Valley Highway commences at the intersection of Stud Road and Burwood Highway in Wantirna South and heads south as Stud Road as a six-lane, dual-carriageway road (sharing a dedicated bus lane on-and-off) and continues south through Scoresby to Rowville, crossing Wellington Road and narrowing back to a four-lane, dual-carriageway road. It continues south to Dandenong, narrowing further to a four-lane, single-carriageway road south past David Street, changes name to Foster Street south of Clow Street, to the intersection with Princes Highway through central Dandenong. Running concurrent along Princes Highway, it resumes running south along Frankston–Dandenong Road as a four-lane, dual-carriageway road through Dandenong South and Carrum Downs, where it eventually crosses west under the Frankston railway line and terminates at the intersection with Overton Road, Wells Road and Dandenong Road West in Frankston.

== History ==
The passing of the Country Roads Act 1912 through the Parliament of Victoria provided for the establishment of the Country Roads Board (later VicRoads) and their ability to declare Main Roads, taking responsibility for the management, construction and care of the state's major roads from local municipalities; the later passing of the Developmental Roads Act 1918 allowed the Country Road Board to declare Developmental Roads, serving to develop any area of land by providing access to a railway station for primary producers. Dandenong-Frankston Road was declared a Developmental Road from Frankston to Lyndhurst on 11 December 1918, and from Lyndhurst to Dandenong on 1 July 1919, then re-declared as a Main Road across its entire length on 26 March 1926.

The elimination of the railway crossing where Dandenong–Frankston Road crossed the Pakenham railway line in Dandenong commenced in 1956, carried out by the Dandenong Shire Council, with assistance from Victorian Railways and the Country Roads Board, and completed in 1957, with the eastern half of a four-lane overpass over the railway completed and open to traffic in September, and the western half completed not long afterwards.

The entire alignment (as its constituent roads) was signed as Metropolitan Route 9 between Wantirna and Frankston in 1965. It was re-routed from Dandenong Road East and Beach Street through Frankston to its current alignment when the Beach Street railway crossing was eliminated in 1991.

The passing of the Transport Act 1983 (itself an evolution from the original Highways and Vehicles Act 1924) provided for the declaration of State Highways, roads two-thirds financed by the State government through the Road Construction Authority (later VicRoads). Stud Highway and Dandenong-Frankston Highway were both declared State Highways in March 1990, from Burwood Highway in Wantirna South to Princes Highway in Dandenong (as Stud Highway), and from there to the Wells Road/Overton Road intersection just north of Frankston (as Dandenong–Frankston Highway, subsuming the original declaration of Dandenong-Frankston Road as a Main Road). These two highways were fused into one only 9 months later, and re-declared as Dandenong Valley Highway in December 1990, in the same alignment as the previous highways, from Wantirna South to Frankston; however all roads were known (and signposted) as their constituent parts.

The passing of the Road Management Act 2004 granted the responsibility of overall management and development of Victoria's major arterial roads to VicRoads: in 2004, VicRoads declared the road as Dandenong Valley Highway (Arterial #6090), from Burwood Highway in Wantirna South to Wells Road crossing underneath the Frankston railway line in Frankston, while re-declaring the remaining roads within the corridor as Stud Road (Arterial #5796), and Klauer Road (today Klauer Street, Wells Road and Dandenong Road West) (Arterial #5159); as before, all roads are still presently known (and signposted) as their constituent parts.

In April 2024 the section of Stud Road from Monash Freeway to Heatherton Road in Dandenong was reduced from 80km/h to 60km/h after a number of fatal accidents; two pedestrians had been killed in the previous six years, with the local council calling for additional safety measures such as a pedestrian crossing or overpass for access from the western side of Stud Road across to Dandenong Stadium.

== Major intersections ==
| LGA | Location | km | mi | Destinations | Notes |
|---|---|---|---|---|---|
| Knox | Wantirna South | 0.0 | 0.0 | Stud Road (Metro Route 9 north) – Wantirna, Ringwood, Boronia | Northern terminus of Dandenong Valley Highway, Metro Route 9 continues north along Stud Road towards Ringwood |
| Knox | Wantirna South | 0.0 | 0.0 | Burwood Highway (Metro Route 26) – Ferntree Gully, Belgrave, City | |
| Knox | Wantirna South | 1.0 | 0.62 | High Street Road (Metro Route 24) – Glen Waverley, Wantirna South | |
| Knox | Scoresby | 3.4 | 2.1 | Ferntree Gully Road (Metro Route 22) – Oakleigh, Ferntree Gully | |
| Knox | Rowville | 4.8 | 3.0 | Kelletts Road – Ferntree Gully | |
| Knox | Rowville | 6.8 | 4.2 | Wellington Road (Metro Route 18 west/C413 east) – Mulgrave, Oakleigh, Lysterfield, Emerald | |
| Knox | Rowville | 6.9 | 4.3 | Bergins Road – Endeavour Hills, Doveton | |
| Greater Dandenong | Dandenong North | 10.4 | 6.5 | Monash Freeway (M1) – Pakenham, Warragul, Chadstone, City | |
| Greater Dandenong | Dandenong | 11.6 | 7.2 | Heatherton Road (Metro Route 14) – Noble Park, Endeavour Hills | |
| Greater Dandenong | Dandenong | 13.3 | 8.3 | Clow Street – Dandenong, Doveton | Southern end of Stud Road, northern end of Foster Street |
| Greater Dandenong | Dandenong | 14.0 | 8.7 | Lonsdale Street (Alt National Route 1 north) – Oakleigh, City; Foster Street (west) – Noble Park | Concurrency with route National Alt Route 1 Southern end of Foster Street east of Lonsdale Street, northern end of Dandenong-Frankston Road south of Lonsdale Street |
| Greater Dandenong | Dandenong | 14.2 | 8.8 | Cheltenham Road (Metro Route 10) – Mentone, Black Rock | Concurrency with route National Alt Route 1 Southern end of Foster Street east of Lonsdale Street, northern end of Dandenong-Frankston Road south of Lonsdale Street |
| Greater Dandenong | Dandenong | 14.8 | 9.2 | Lonsdale Street (Alt National Route 1 east) – Berwick | Concurrency with route National Alt Route 1 Southern end of Foster Street east of Lonsdale Street, northern end of Dandenong-Frankston Road south of Lonsdale Street |
| Greater Dandenong | Dandenong | 15.1 | 9.4 | Pakenham and Cranbourne railway lines | |
| Greater Dandenong | Dandenong South | 15.7 | 9.8 | Dandenong Bypass – Keysborough, Clayton | |
| Greater Dandenong | Dandenong South | 16.8 | 10.4 | Greens Road (Metro Route 12) – Mordialloc, Keysborough | |
| Frankston | Carrum Downs | 23.6 | 14.7 | Thompson Road (Metro Route 6 west) – Carrum; Thompsons Road (Metro Route 6 east) – Cranbourne, Clyde North | |
| Frankston | Carrum Downs | 27.3 | 17.0 | Lathams Road (B664 west) – Seaford; Hall Road (B664 east) – Skye, Cranbourne | |
| Frankston | Carrum Downs | 28.7 | 17.8 | Mornington Peninsula Freeway (M11) – Dingley Village, Frankston, Mount Martha, Rosebud | |
| Frankston | Frankston North | 29.3 | 18.2 | Seaford Road (west) – Seaford; Ballarto Road (east) – Skye | |
| Frankston | Seaford | 32.0 | 19.9 | Frankston Freeway (M3) – Ringwood, Frankston South, City | |
| Frankston | Seaford | 32.2 | 20.0 | Skye Road (east) – Frankston; Dandenong Road East (south) – Frankston | |
| Frankston | Seaford–Frankston boundary | 32.2 | 20.0 | Frankston railway line | |
| Frankston | Frankston | 32.2 | 20.0 | Overton Road (west) – Frankston; Wells Road (north) – Seaford | |
| Frankston | Frankston | 32.2 | 20.0 | Dandenong Road West (Metro Route 9 south) – Frankston | Southern terminus of Dandenong Valley Highway, southern end of Dandenong–Frankston Road; Metro Route 9 continues south along Dandenong Road West towards Frankston |
1.000 mi = 1.609 km; 1.000 km = 0.621 mi: Concurrency terminus; Route transition
