= Lachie Young =

Australian rules footballer (born 1999)

Personal information
- Born: 6 April 1999 (age 27)
- Original team: Dandenong Stingrays
- Draft: No. 6 in the 2019 Rookie draft
- Debut: 21 April 2019, Western Bulldogs vs. Carlton, at Docklands
- Height: 189 cm (6 ft 2 in)
- Weight: 81 kg (179 lb)

Playing career^{1}
| Years | Club | Games (Goals) |
| 2019–2020 | Western Bulldogs | 8 (1) |
| 2021–2023 | North Melbourne | 39 (1) |
| Total | | 47 (2) |
- ^{1} Playing statistics correct to the end of the 2023 season.

Lachie Young (born 6 April 1999) is an Australian rules footballer who played for the Western Bulldogs and North Melbourne in the Australian Football League (AFL).

== Early life ==
Young is the elder brother of Fremantle player Hayden Young. He attended high school at Mornington Secondary College.

== Career ==
Young was selected by the Western Bulldogs at pick #6 in the 2019 Rookie draft. He made his senior debut against Carlton in round 5 of the 2019 season.

Young was traded to North Melbourne at the conclusion of the 2020 AFL season.

Young was delisted from the North Melbourne Football Club in October 2023.
