= Somerville, Victoria =

Somerville
- Town
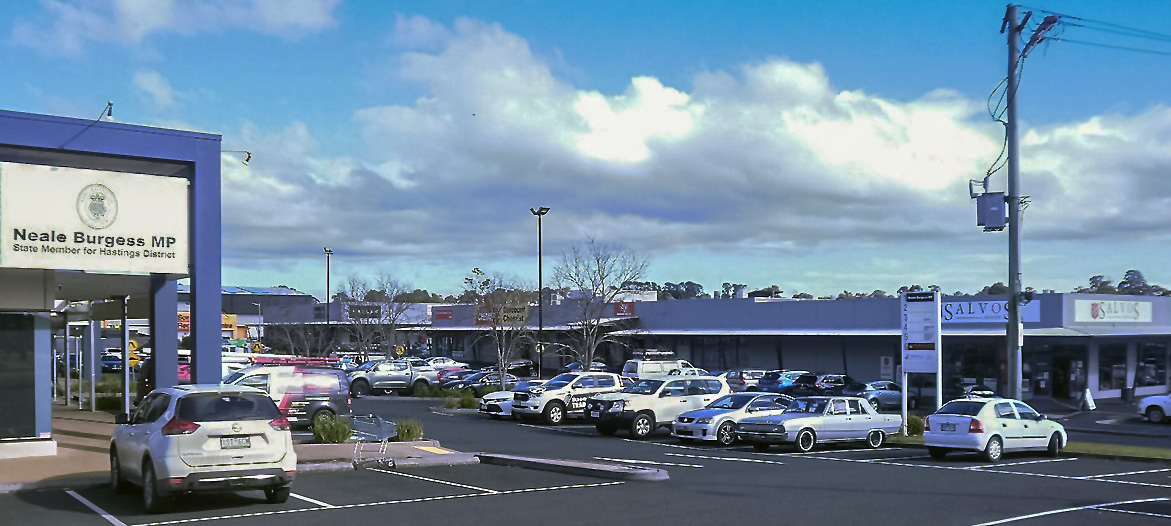
- Somerville Plaza on Eramosa Road West

- Interactive map of Somerville
- Coordinates: 38.226°S 145.177°E
- Country: Australia
- State: Victoria
- LGA: Shire of Mornington Peninsula
- Location: 55 km (34 mi) from Melbourne; 17 km (11 mi) from Frankston

Government
  - State electorate: Hastings
  - Federal division: Flinders

Area
  - Total: 38 km^{2} (15 sq mi)

Population
  - Total: 19,370 (Estimated May 2025)
  - Density: 510/km^{2} (1,320/sq mi)
- Postcode: 3912
Localities around Somerville
Baxter	Pearcedale	Pearcedale
Moorooduc	Somerville	Western Port
Moorooduc	Tyabb	Western Port

Somerville is a town on the Mornington Peninsula in Melbourne, Victoria, Australia, 49 km (30 mi) south-east of Melbourne's Central Business District, located within the Shire of Mornington Peninsula local government area. Somerville has an estimated population of 19,370 as of May 2025.

Somerville forms part of an urban enclave on Western Port comprising Somerville, Hastings, Bittern, Crib Point, and Tyabb. Statistically, it is part of Greater Melbourne.

The size of Somerville is approximately 38 km^{2} (15 sq mi).

Originally an orchard town Somerville has experienced significant population growth over the last twenty-five years.

It is served by Somerville railway station on the Stony Point Line, as well as a bus service to Frankston.

Yaringa Marina, east of the township, offers boat access to Western Port.

== History ==
The township was once located on Lower Somerville Road, with several original buildings still present today. Somerville Post Office opened on 21 November 1870 and closed in 1893.

The railway came to Somerville in September 1889, Somerville station was originally located approximately one mile from Lower Somerville Road and the town centre but was relocated to its current site during the 1890s. Somerville Railway Station Post Office opened on 15 August 1890 and was renamed Somerville in 1907.

The Somerville Hotel was built in the early 1900s along with the Mechanics' Hall which formed part of the Station Street shopping strip. The north side of the station, lining the railway had historical buildings that were burnt down in 1987 in an act of vandalism.

Somerville was known during the early 1900s through to World War II for the fruit that was produced in its orchards. A harvest festival was held once yearly and special trains ran from Flinders Street station to the town during the festival.

During the late 1980s and early to mid 1990s the town experienced a population increase with a number of housing estates created.

The Somerville war memorial was unveiled on 4 November 1923 at the intersection of Frankston Flinders Road and Eramosa Road West. With the increasing population and traffic, the memorial was moved from this busy intersection to Clarinda Street in 1966. From November 2014 to April 2015 the memorial was moved from Clarinda Street to the Fruitgrowers Reserve. The cenotaph was restored with markers surrounding it telling the residents the history of the area. Trees were also planted surrounding the memorial remembering the lost soldiers.

An avenue of honour was originally located on Eramosa Road East where road was lined with plane trees in 1917. Each tree represented a resident who fought in World War 1 in Somerville. These trees were removed by the local Shire and footpaths laid in their place in the 1970s. In early 2013 a new avenue of honour of ornamental pear trees was planted along Station Street.

At the 2016 census, Somerville had a population of 11,336 up from 10,730 in 2011, 10,704 in 2006 and 10,049 in 2001.

== Today ==
Somerville is experiencing urban growth with an expanding residential area surrounding its retail and commercial hub. Somerville has a vast shopping district with both Woolworths and Coles supermarkets, Target, Aldi and other speciality shops. The iconic Somerville Hotel is a well-known landmark.

There are many parks and playgrounds scattered throughout the area, including the Jones Road Oval and the Fruitgrowers Reserve.

There are award-winning coffee shops located in Somerville.

The Mechanics' Hall is a popular venue hosting local bands and small school concerts. On 7 January 2015, a massive storm ravaged Somerville and the neighbouring town of Tyabb, ripping the roof off the hall. The roof was restored the following week.

Peninsula Pottery Industries which operated from 1901 to 1979, made bricks for some of the historical buildings in Somerville including St. Andrews Anglican Church and the Somerville Hotel in 1901, but all historical kilns and the chimneys were removed in 2004. Peninsula Pottery Industries was officially deregistered in 1979. Residential development occurred to the south of the pottery a few years after the closure including Wellington Road and Highfield Way estates. The clay pottery reopened in 2015 after years of closure and is now owned and operated by the Bayport Group located at 9 Pottery Road, Somerville, where they are digging to a depth of 30 metres over the 60 acres.

Inghams also has a large factory north of Somerville that employs a large number of the towns population. Inghams is an Australian-based poultry supplier and producer. The company was founded in 1918 by Walter Ingham. Following his death in 1953, his two sons, Jack and Bob Ingham took over the small breeding operation and developed the site into the largest producer of chickens and turkeys in Australia.

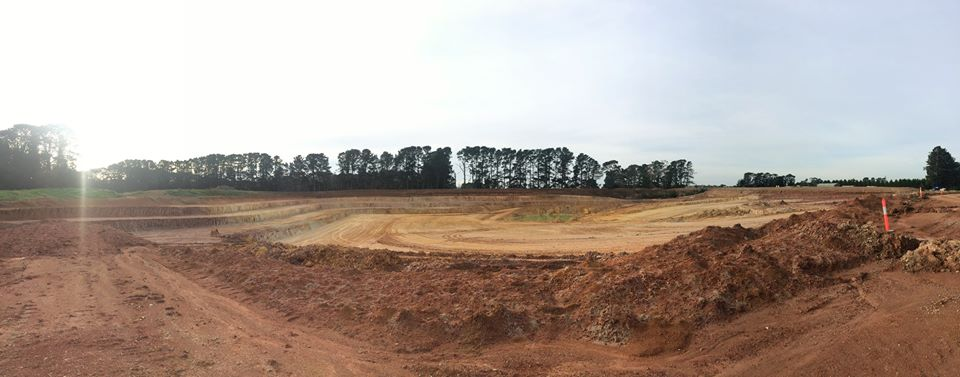
Bayport Quarry "claypit" on Pottery road, Somerville 2016

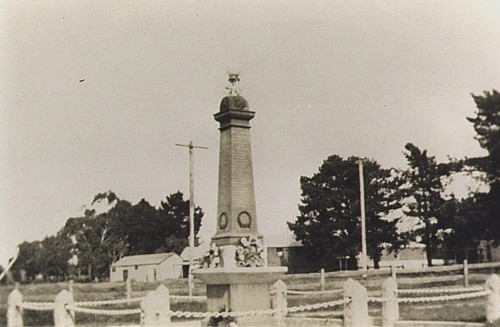
Somerville war Memorial in 1923 located at the intersection of Frankston-Flinders and Eramosa roads.

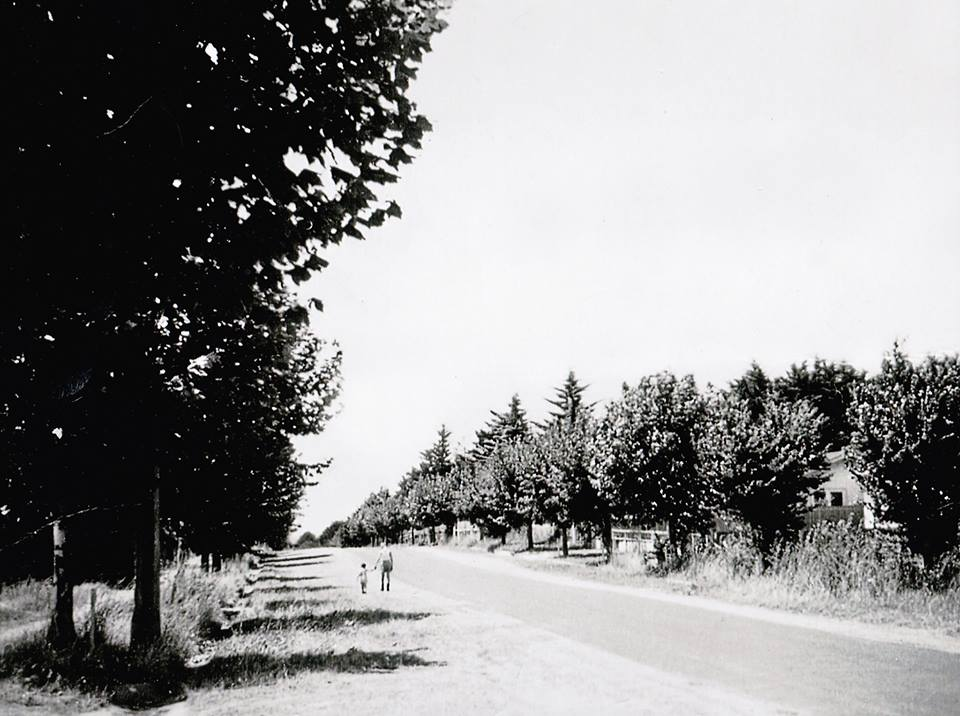
The original avenue of honour in the 1950s lining Eramosa road East with Plane Trees.

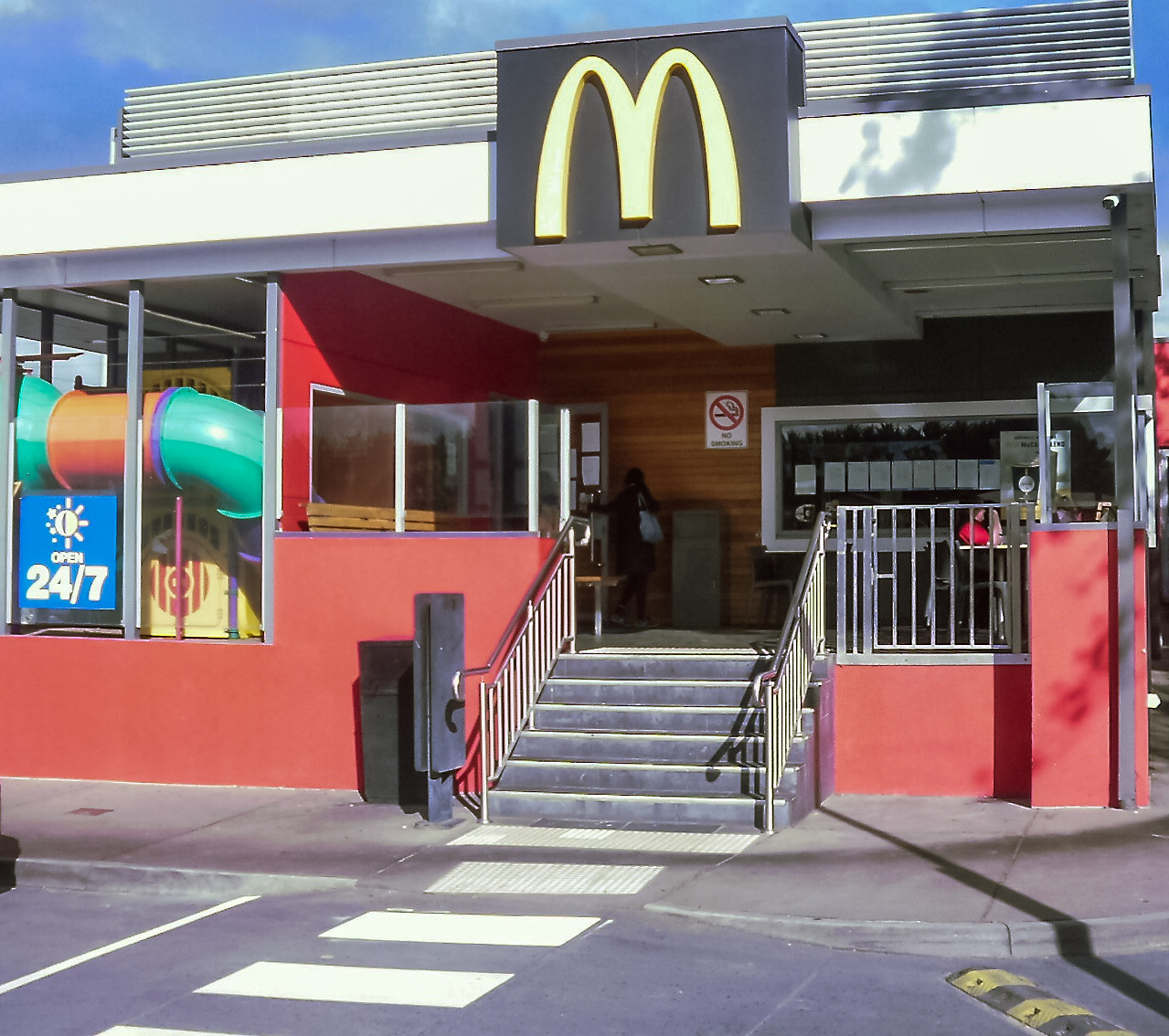
McDonald's in Somerville

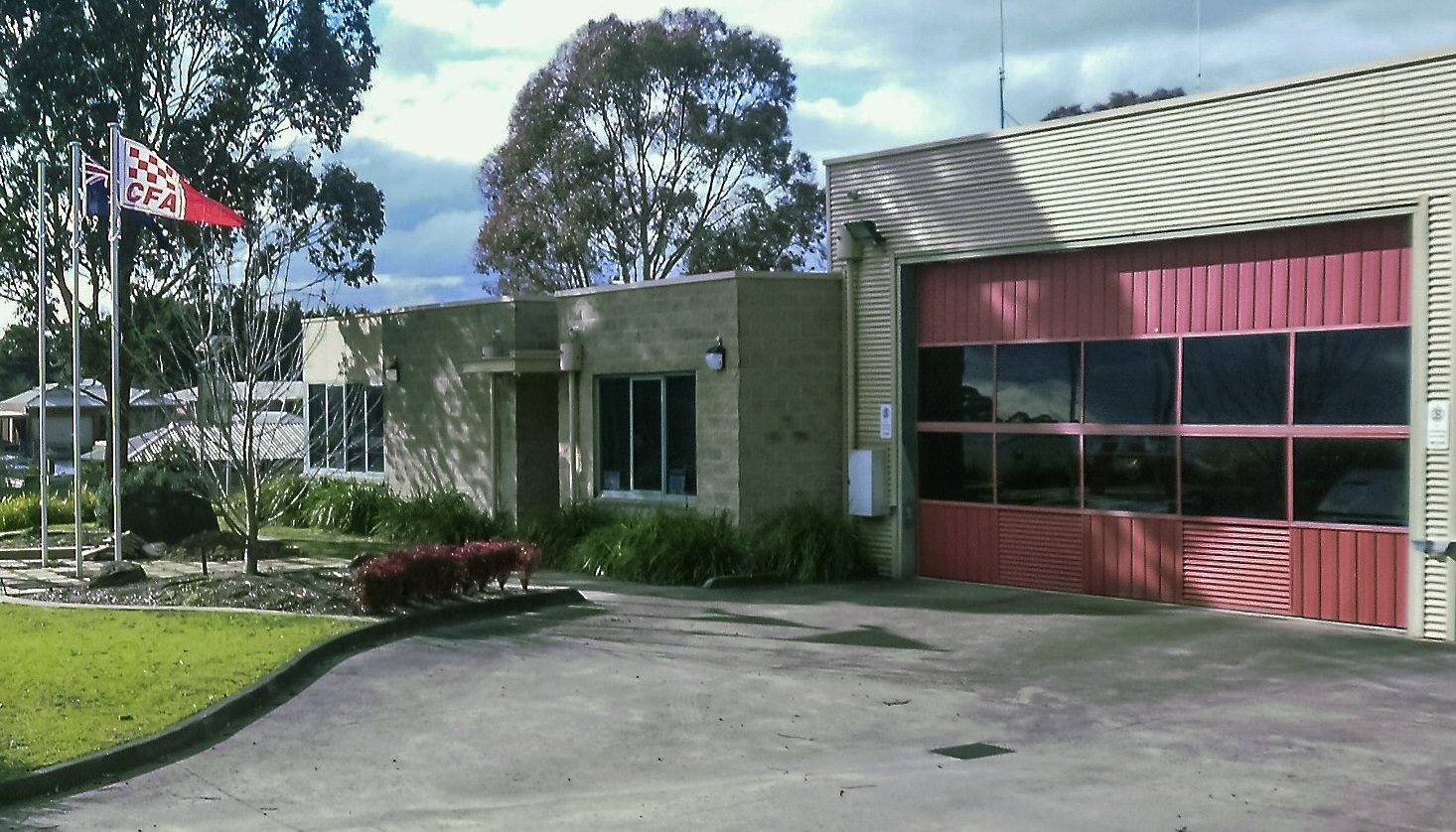
Somerville Fire station 2021

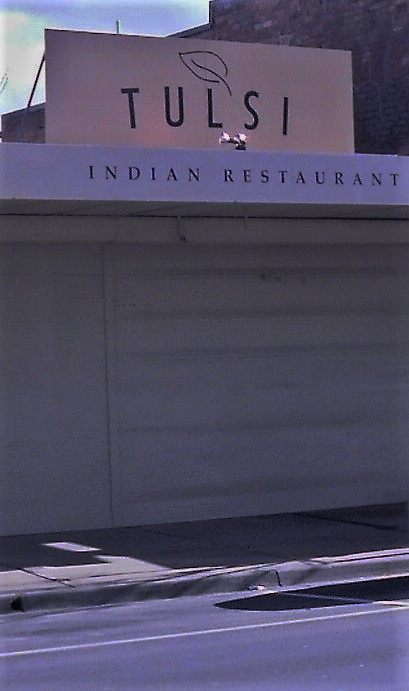
Station St, Somerville

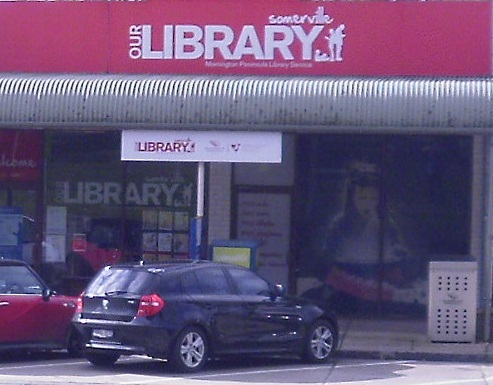
Somerville Library

== Schools ==
Somerville is serviced by three primary schools:

State:

• Somerville Primary School

• Somerville Rise Primary School

Private:

• Saint Brendan's Catholic Primary School

And one secondary school:

• Somerville Secondary College

Some students commute to several other schools in the area including:

State schools:

• Mount Erin Secondary College, Frankston South

• Mornington Secondary College, Mornington

• Western Port Secondary College, Hastings

• Elisabeth Murdoch College, Langwarrin

Private schools:

• Flinders Christian Community College, Tyabb

• Woodleigh School, Langwarrin South

• Padua College, Mornington

• Peninsula School, Mount Eliza

• Toorak College, Mount Eliza

== Business and organisations ==
Somerville, Victoria has a significant business community, most notable include:

- Sealite Pty Ltd – Sealite, part of SPX Technologies (NYSE: SPXC) is a technology leader in the design and manufacture of marine aids to navigation (AtoN) equipment including Marine Lighting, Navigation Buoys, Marine Floats, Port Entry Lighting systems, Lighthouse Lighting Equipment, and Monitoring and Control systems software.
- It's Okay Not to be Okay – It's Okay not to be Okay was started in 2016 by us three grieving sisters who lost our brother Ben to suicide. It's Okay not to be Okay is a registered charity that's mission is to advocate and create change in mental health, grief and suicide prevention.
- STPL News - is a Somervile founded news outlet delivering digital and online local news across the Mornington Peninsula and Frankston. Through its printed publications, ''Somerville Times'' and ''Peninsula Local'', it highlights local stories, key events, and important updates. Founded during the COVID-19 lockdowns to support local businesses, it has grown into a reliable, independent news source.

== Sport ==
Somerville has a strong sporting club culture including:

Mornington Peninsula Badminton Inc.

Somerville Football Club – competing in the Mornington Peninsula Nepean Football League, Nepean Division.

Somerville Cricket Club – Competing in the M.P.C.A., District Division.

Somerville Netball Club competing in Frankston district netball association (F.D.N.A)

Somerville Tennis Club has competitions for juniors, mid-week ladies and night tennis (both mixed and men's)

Lawn bowls Somerville Bowling Club

Basketball as part of the Western Port Basketball Association

The Community and Recreation Centre provides an opportunity for the region to engage in sport and physical activity and is supported by local sporting groups Mornington Peninsula Badminton Inc., Western Port Basketball Association, and the Baxter Indoor Netball Association.

== Notable people ==
- Bianca Chatfield – Former Australian netballer – retired
- Andrejs Everitt – Former AFL player – retired
- Shaun Graf – Former Australian cricketer – retired
- Nick Haynes – Current Carlton Blues AFL player
- Michael Hibberd – Former Melbourne AFL player – retired
- Hayden Young – Current Fremantle Dockers AFL player
- Lachie Young – Former North Melbourne AFL player – delisted

== See also ==
- Shire of Hastings – Somerville was previously within this former local government area.
