= Moorooduc =

- Town
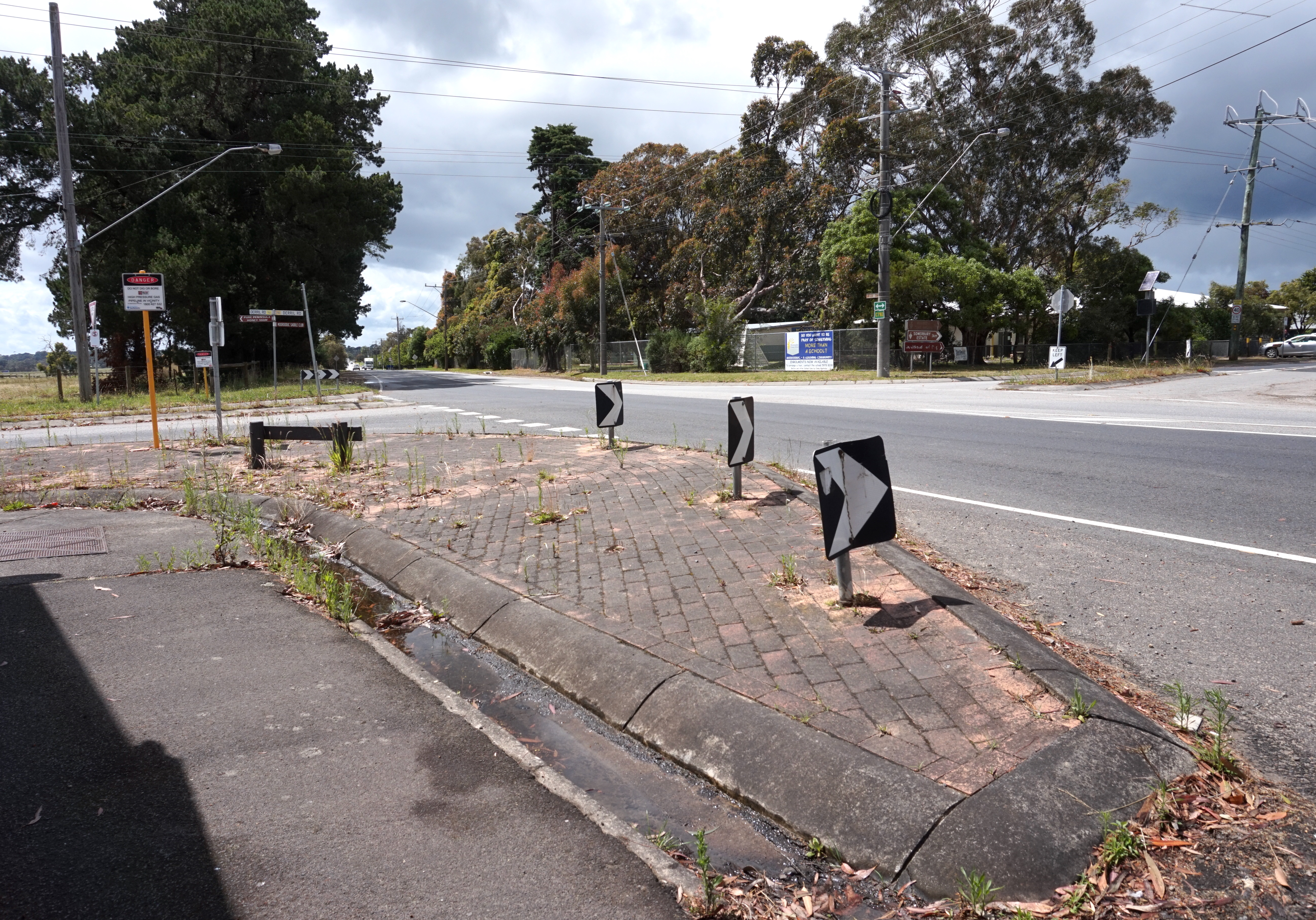
- Intersection of Mornington-Tyabb Road and Derril Road

- Interactive map of Moorooduc
- Coordinates: 38.247°S 145.105°E
- Country: Australia
- State: Victoria
- LGA: Shire of Mornington Peninsula
- Location: 54 km (34 mi) from Melbourne; 13 km (8.1 mi) from Frankston

Government
  - State electorate: Mornington, Hastings
  - Federal division: Flinders

Population
  - Total: 1,004 (2021 census)
- Postcode: 3933
Localities around Moorooduc
Mount Eliza	Baxter	Somerville
Mornington	Moorooduc	Tyabb
Mount Martha	Tuerong	Hastings

Moorooduc is a town on the Mornington Peninsula in Melbourne, Victoria, Australia, 54 km (34 mi) south-east of Melbourne's central business district, located within the Shire of Mornington Peninsula local government area. Moorooduc recorded a population of 1,004 at the 2021 census.

The Moorooduc Highway runs through the locality, being the main route between Melbourne and the Peninsula.

Moorooduc Post Office opened on 27 August 1890 and closed in 1980.

The Mornington Railway Preservation Society operates steam and diesel train services from Moorooduc railway station on weekends and public holidays.

A short walk from the tourist Moorooduc railway station is the Moorooduc Quarry Flora and Fauna Reserve (located in Mount Eliza).

== Attractions ==
There are a number of different things to do in Moorooduc including;

- Mornington Tourist Railway
- Devilbend Golf Club

== Education ==
Moorooduc Primary School (No. 2327) opened on 1 November 1880, on the current site located on Mornington-Tyabb Road. In 2006, the school celebrated 125 years.

== Sport ==
Golfers play at the Devilbend Golf Club on Loders Road and Moorooduc Saddle Club is located on Derril Road.

The Mornington Peninsula Pony Club provides dressage, show jumping and cross-country facilities for young equestrian enthusiasts. The club is affiliated with the Pony Club Association of Victoria.

== See also ==
- Shire of Hastings – Parts of Moorooduc were previously within this former local government area.
- Shire of Mornington – Parts of Moorooduc were previously within this former local government area.
