= Tyabb =

- Town
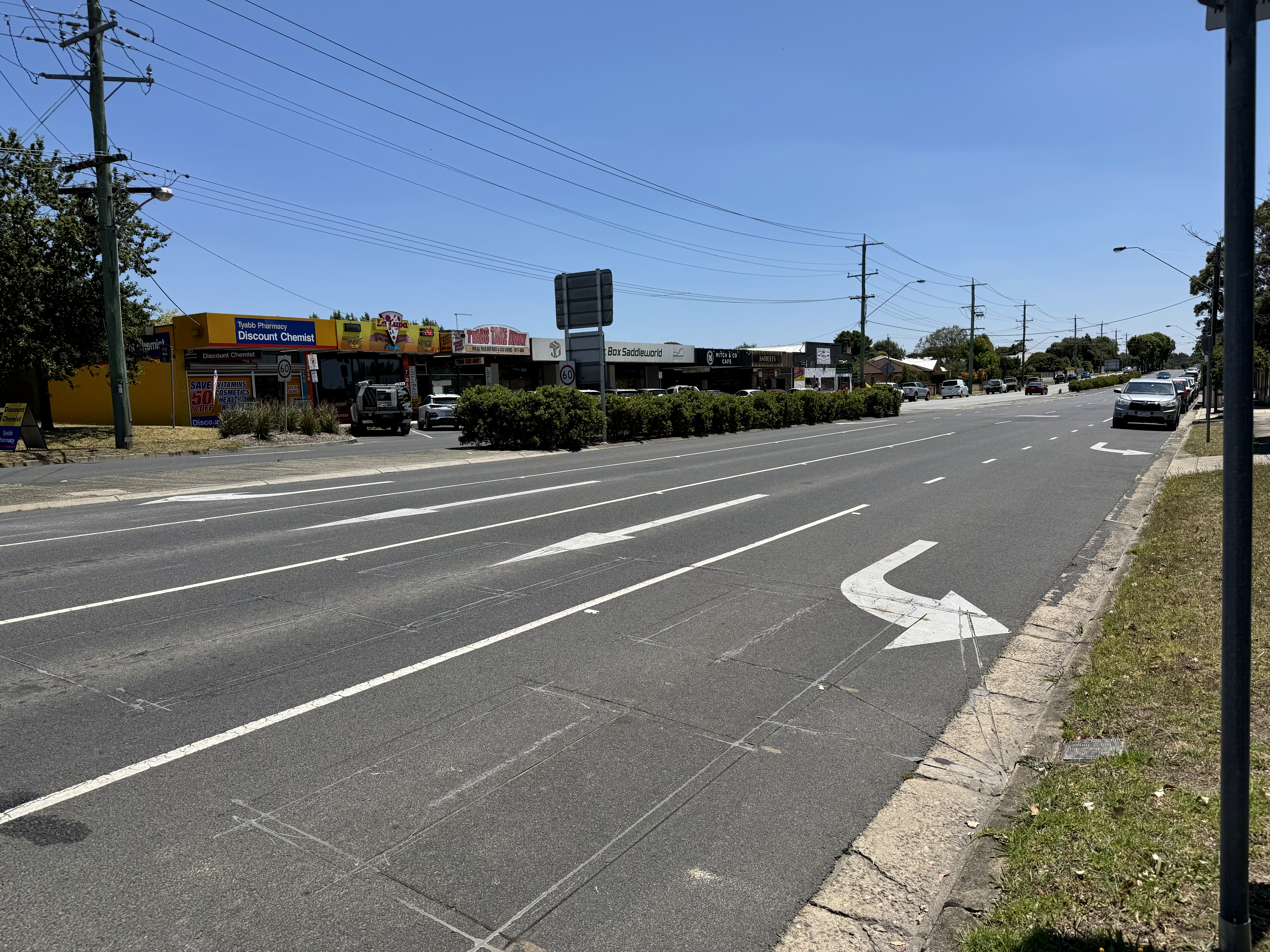
- Frankston-Flinders Road and shops in Tyabb

- Interactive map of Tyabb
- Coordinates: 38.259°S 145.189°E
- Country: Australia
- State: Victoria
- LGA: Shire of Mornington Peninsula
- Location: 72 km (45 mi) from Melbourne; 5 km (3.1 mi) from Hastings

Government
  - State electorate: Hastings
  - Federal division: Flinders

Area
  - Total: 66.5 km^{2} (25.7 sq mi)

Population
  - Total: 3,449 (2021 census)
  - Density: 51.86/km^{2} (134.33/sq mi)
- Postcode: 3913
Localities around Tyabb
Moorooduc	Somerville	Western Port
Moorooduc	Tyabb	Western Port
Hastings	Hastings	Western Port

Tyabb (/ˈtaɪæb/ TY-ab) is a town on the Mornington Peninsula in Melbourne, Victoria, Australia, 53 km (33 mi) south-east of Melbourne's central business district, located within the Shire of Mornington Peninsula local government area. Tyabb recorded a population of 3,449 at the 2021 census.

Tyabb is within an urban enclave on Western Port comprising Tyabb, Hastings, Bittern, Crib Point, and Somerville. It is served by the Tyabb railway station on the Stony Point railway line. Statistically it is part of Greater Melbourne.

== History ==
Tyabb is derived from the Boonwurrung word jouap, one of the recorded names for French Island.

The Post Office opened on 9 March 1891 shortly after the arrival of the railway in 1889.

The local area was well known as a fruit growing area in the early twentieth century and was identified by the "TYCOS" brand, which was the name used by the local growers co-operative.

=== Heritage listing ===
The following place in Tyabb is listed on the Victorian Heritage Register:

- Commonwealth Aircraft Corporation Hangar (former), 12 Stuart Road at Tyabb Airport

== Today ==
Tyabb is a small township with three primary schools and two high-schools, a Country Fire Authority station, bakery, antique store, motel, cafes and unmanned railway station. There are a number of businesses in the town including fruit processing, cabinet makers, arborists, motel, cafes, pharmacy, equine outfitters and engineering workshops.

Tyabb is well known for its many antique shops. The largest, the Tyabb Packing House Antique complex is housed in an historic cool store building dating from the area's fruit growing past. The Tyabb Packing House Antique complex reputedly has one of the largest retail antique collections under one roof in the southern hemisphere. There are several other antique shops in the Tyabb township.

Tyabb also has Tyabb Airport, a private airfield which has been operating for more than fifty years and is owned by Peninsula Aero Club. The airfield hosts an internationally recognised Air Show every second year. The airfield provides access to the area for all emergency services and is an important part of the town's economy being the largest employer in the district. It is also home to a collection of important and unique antique and warbird aircraft as well as successful flying school.

In the last decade there has been rapid residential development in the town, changing its rural character. Tyabb has its own cricket and football teams known as the Yabbies competing in the Mornington Peninsula Cricket Association and Mornington Peninsula Nepean Football League respectively.

Tyabb is one of the few towns in Australia that does not have a pub. Although the town is over 100 years old it has never had a pub, however two liquor vendors are operating in the town.

Tyabb has given its name to the Tyabb Fault, an ancient geological formation extending from Tyabb across the Peninsula to Mornington, and Tyabb Loam, the characteristic soil of the district. The Tyabb Fault produces many small earthquakes throughout the year.

Tyabb was the scene of a brutal murder when an eleven-year-old boy, Luke Batty, was stabbed to death by his father, following cricket practice on 12 February 2014. His father was shot dead by police at the scene.

== See also ==
- Shire of Hastings – Tyabb was previously within this former local government area.
