= Lakes and reservoirs of Melbourne =

Bodies of water in Melbourne, Australia

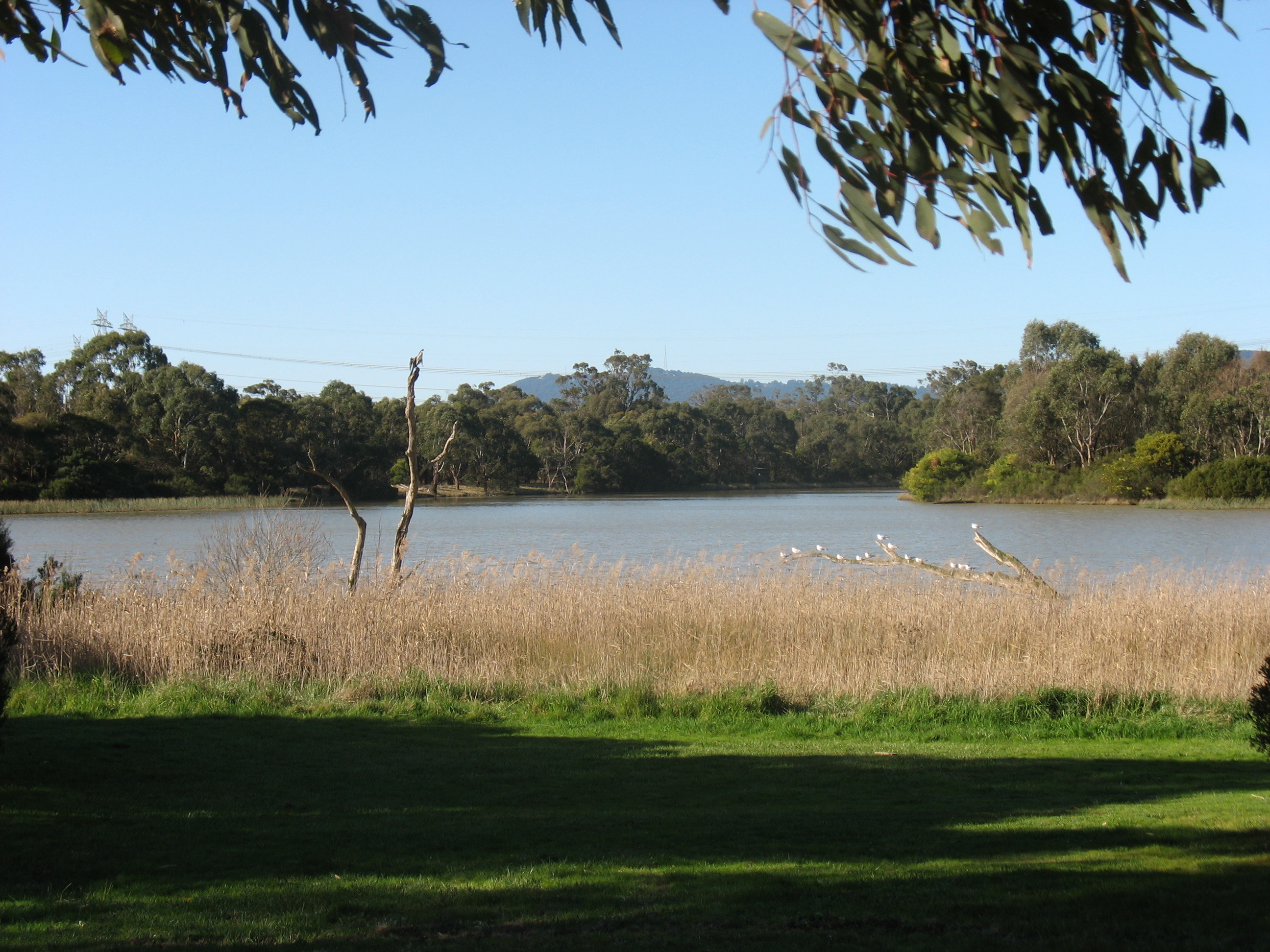
Jells Lake in Wheelers Hill, one of the wetland lakes of Dandenong Valley Parklands

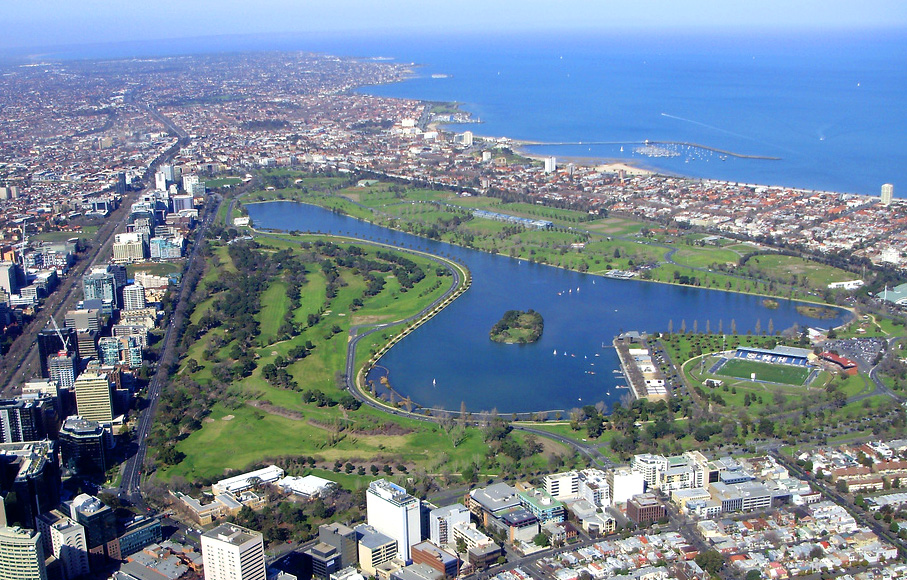
Albert Park Lake, surrounded by the Grand Prix racetrack

Melbourne is the capital city of southeastern Australian state of Victoria and also the nation's second most populous city, and has been consistently voted one of the most liveable cities in the world. Located on the northern/eastern coastal plains of Port Phillip Bay, the city is one of the drier capital cities in Australia (with an annual rainfall only half of Sydney's), but due to its relatively flat terrain and the runoffs fed from surrounding highlands, still has many lakes, ponds and wetlands, mainly managed by Melbourne Water and Parks Victoria. The larger waterbodies are used for water sports, mostly boating (especially sailing, rowing, canoeing and kayaking) but some are used for recreational activities like swimming, water skiing or model boating.

Melbourne also has a number of major artificial lakes as storage reservoirs that supply the city's drinking water, as well as many smaller service reservoirs or retention ponds used either for stormwater management or as auxiliary water storage for drinking supply or agricultural usage during dry seasons. Some of the smaller lakes and ponds are used as wildlife sanctuaries and as parklands for community pastimes such as angling and birdwatching.

The Yarra River, the main urban river of Melbourne, hosts many small wetlands and billabongs particularly through its middle reaches in the Yarra Valley, many of which are not named and are not included here. This article does not include lakes and reservoirs outside of the Greater Melbourne metropolitan area, for information on other lakes in Victoria see the List of reservoirs and dams in Australia.

== Major lakes ==
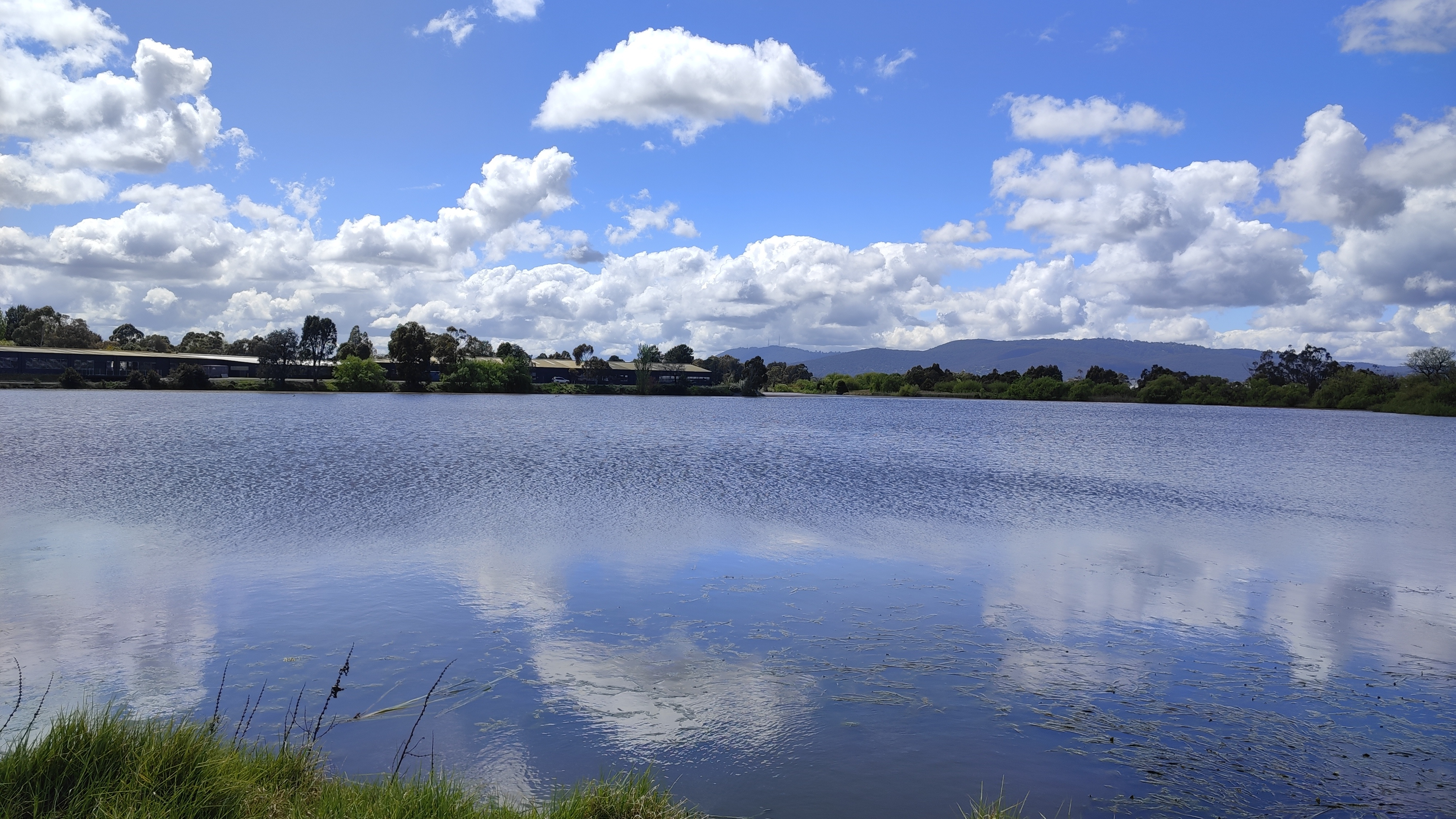
Caribbean Lake, Scoresby

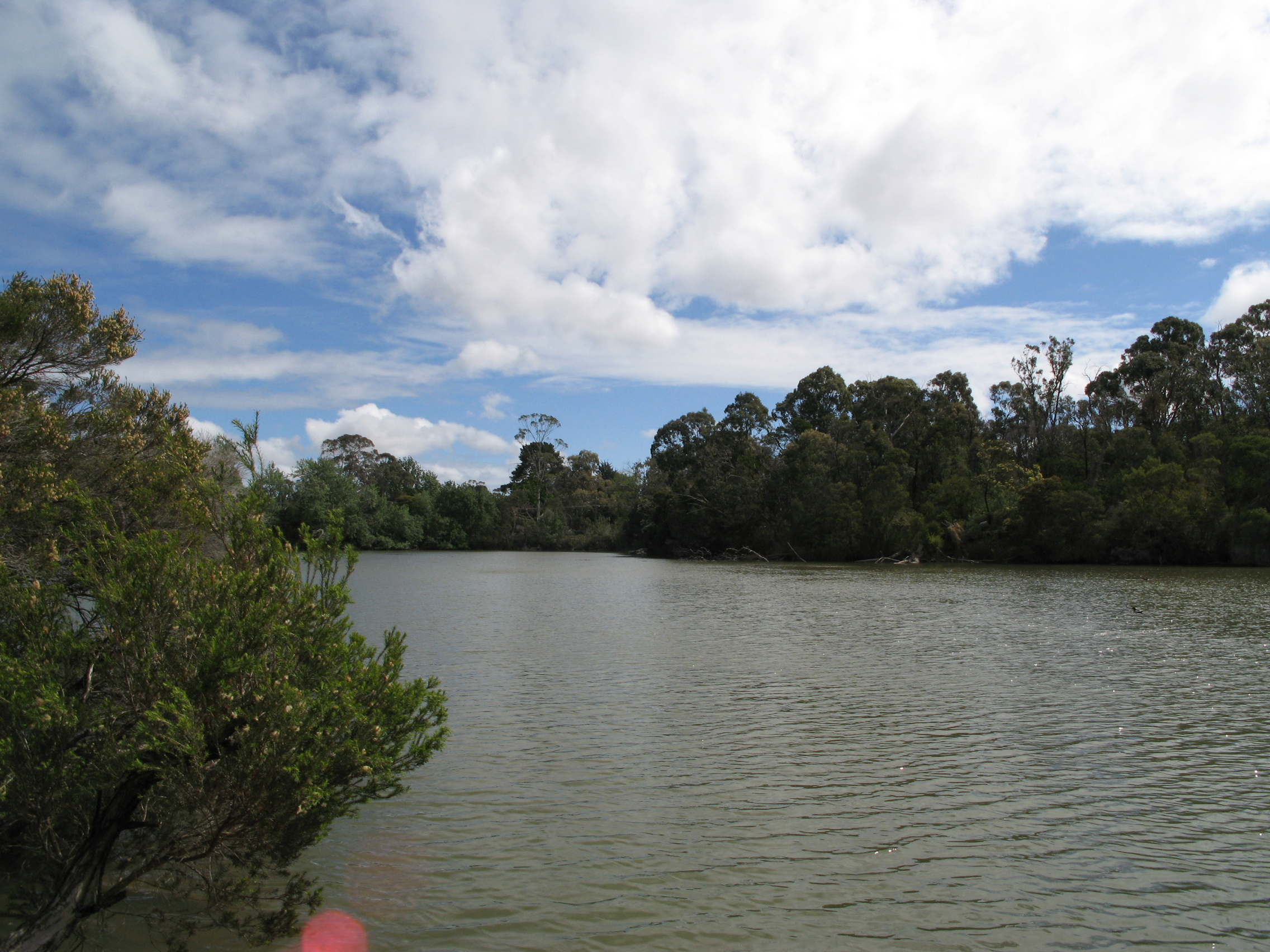
Blackburn Lake

- Albert Park Lake — Albert Park
- Aura Vale Lake — Menzies Creek
- Berwick Springs Lake — Narre Warren South
- Blackburn Lake — Blackburn
- Braeside Park and Woodlands Wetlands — Braeside
- Caribbean Lake — Scoresby
- Carrum Carrum Swamp (former) — southeastern suburbs
- Cherry Lake — Altona
- Edithvale Wetlands — Aspendale and Chelsea Heights
- Highlands Lake — Craigieburn
- Jells Lake — Wheelers Hill
- Karkarook Lake — Heatherton
- Koo-Wee-Rup Swamp (former) — outer southeastern suburbs
- La Trobe University Lakes — Bundoora
  - Main Lake
  - Small Lake
  - Upper Lakes
  - Springthorpe Lake
  - Sports Fields Lake
- Lillydale Lake — Lilydale
- Lysterfield Lake — Lysterfield
- Patterson Lakes — Patterson Lakes
  - Schooner Bay
  - Barellan Harbours
  - Lake Carramar
  - Lake Illawong
  - Lake Legana
- RAAF Lake — Point Cook
- Sanctuary Lakes — Point Cook
- Waterways Lake and Lagoons — Waterways

== Small lakes, ponds & wetlands ==
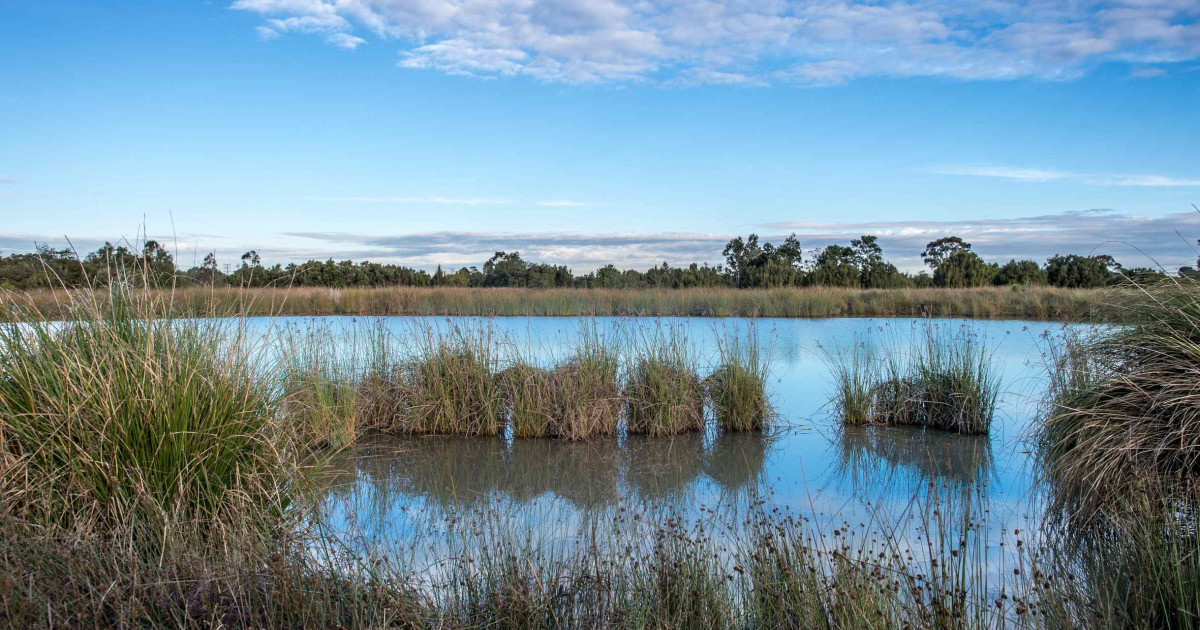
Dandenong Wetlands

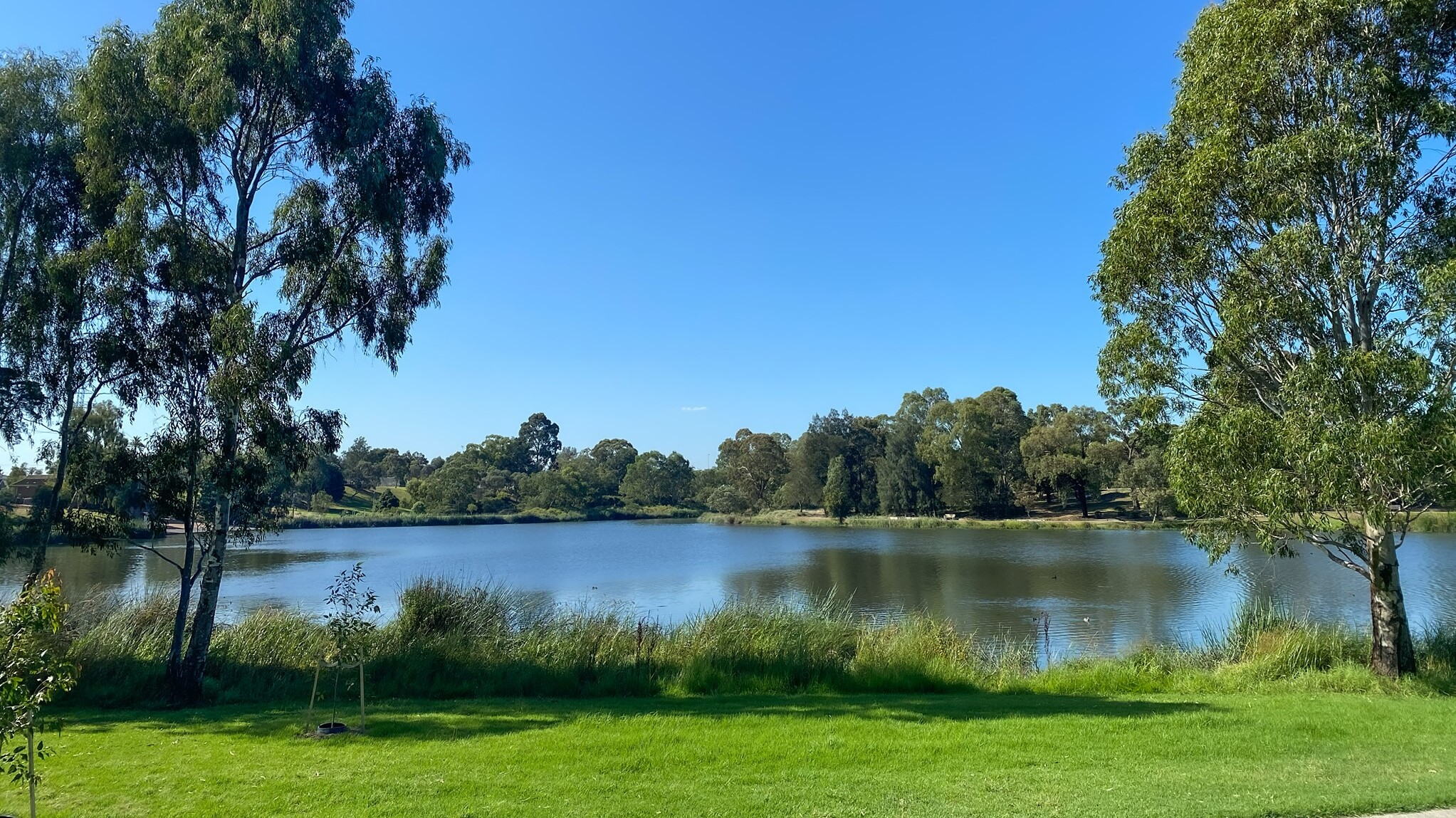
Edwardes Lake, Reservoir

- Anniversary Lake — Berwick
- Banjo Paterson Lake — Lynbrook
- Blue Lake — Plenty
- Burndap Lakes — Maribyrnong
- Bushy Park Wetlands — Glen Waverley
- Cairnlea Lake — Cairnlea
- Casey Fields Lake — Cranbourne East
- Caulfield Racecourse Lake — Caulfield
- Clarendon Lake — Keysborough
- Coburg Lake — Merri Creek at Coburg North
- Dandenong Wetlands — Dandenong
- Edwardes Lake — Reservoir
- Ferntree Gully Quarry Lake — Ferntree Gully
- Frederick Wichter Reserve ponds and wetlands — Keysborough
- Glen Iris Wetlands — Glen Iris
- Hallam Bypass Retarding Basin & Wetlands, Narre Warren
- Hays Paddock Billabong — Kew East
- Hull Road Wetlands — Lilydale
- Jack Roper Reserve lake — Merlynston Creek at Broadmeadows
- Iramoo Lake — Cairnlea
- Jack Roper Reserve (CSL) Retarding Basin — Glenroy
- Kalparrin Lake — Greensborough
- Katoomba Lake — Wantirna
- Kew Billabong — Kew East
- Lake Mcivor — Roxburgh Park
- Lakewood Nature Reserve — Knoxfield
- Lake Treganowan (Emerald Lake) — Emerald
- Liverpool Road Retarding Basin — Boronia
- McAlpin Lake — Ringwood North
- Newport Lakes — Newport
  - North Lake
  - South Lake
- Oakwood Park Ponds — Noble Park North
- Pakenham Lake — Pakenham
- Pencil Park Pond and Wetlands — Keysborough
- Polishing Ponds — Niddrie
- Princess Freeway Retarding Basin — Narre Warren North
- Queens Park Lake — Moonee Ponds
- Ringwood Lake — Ringwood
- River Gum Creek Reserve Wetlands — Hampton Park
- Rowville Lakes — Rowville
  - Cogley Lake
  - Sutton Lake
  - Hill Lake
- Royal Botanic Gardens Lakes — Melbourne CBD
  - Ornamental Lake
  - Central Lake
  - Nymphaea Lily Lake
- Sandown Park Lake — Springvale
- Spectacle Lake — Point Cook
- Springvale Botanical Cemetery Lake — Springvale
- Stamford Park Lake and Wetlands — Rowville
- Talisker Lake — Keysborough
- Tatterson Park Ponds — Keysborough
- Taylors Lakes — Taylors Lakes
- Tirhatuan Wetlands — Rowville and Dandenong North
- Valley Lake - Keilor East
- Waterford Valley Lakes — Rowville
- Waverley Park Lake — Mulgrave
- West Gate Lakes — Port Melbourne

== Major storage reservoirs ==
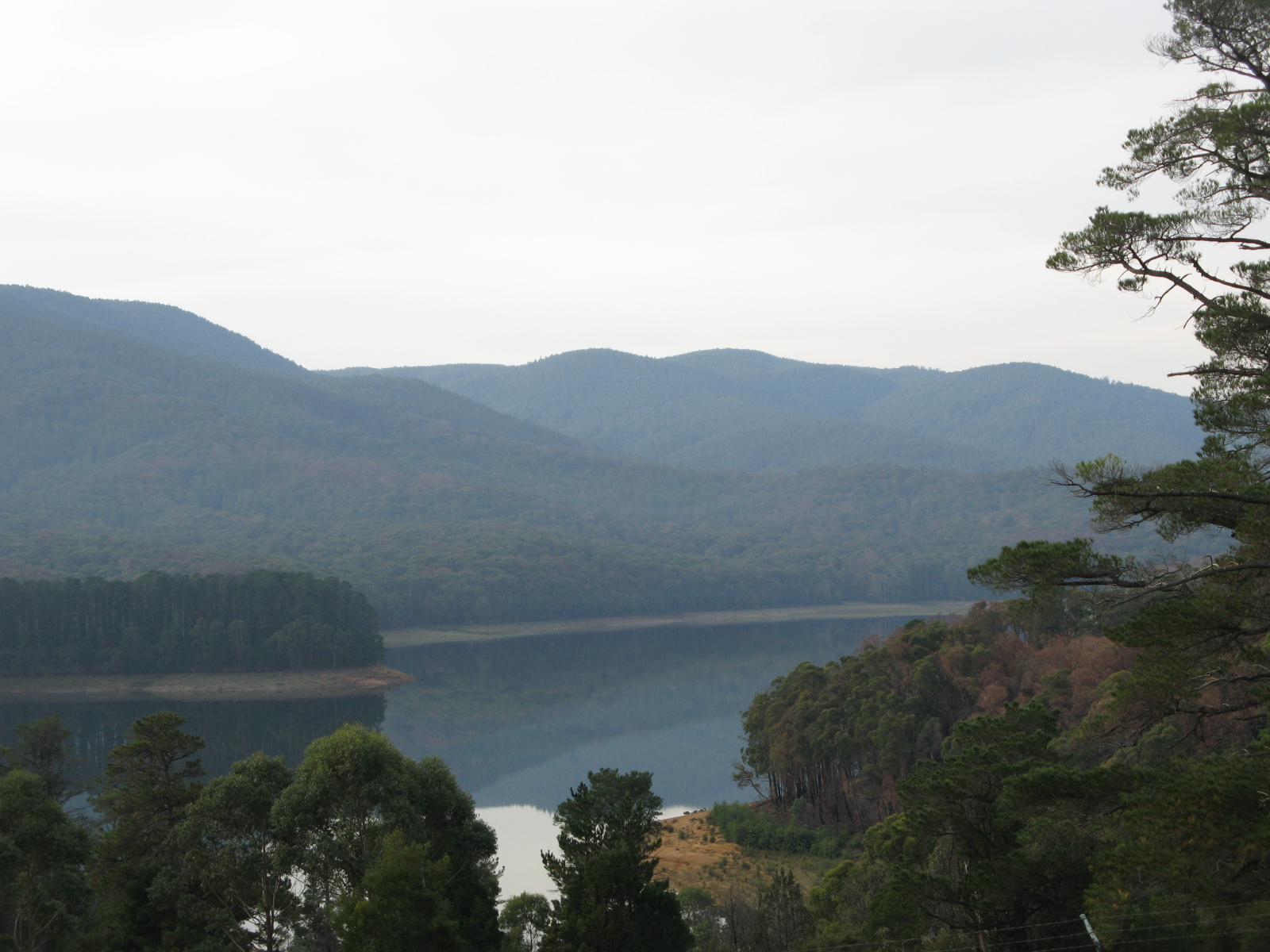
Maroondah Reservoir

- Cardinia Reservoir, Emerald — 287,000 megalitres (6.3×10^{10} imp gal; 7.6×10^{10} US gal)
- Devilbend Reservoir, Tuerong — 14,600 megalitres (3.2×10^{9} imp gal; 3.9×10^{9} US gal)
- Greenvale Reservoir, Greenvale — 27,000 megalitres (5.9×10^{9} imp gal; 7.1×10^{9} US gal)
- Maroondah Reservoir, Healesville — 22,000 megalitres (4.8×10^{9} imp gal; 5.8×10^{9} US gal)
- O'Shannassy Reservoir, McMahons Creek — 3,000 megalitres (660,000,000 imp gal; 790,000,000 US gal)
- Silvan Reservoir, Silvan — 40,000 megalitres (8.8×10^{9} imp gal; 1.1×10^{10} US gal)
- Sugarloaf Reservoir, Christmas Hills — 96,000 megalitres (2.1×10^{10} imp gal; 2.5×10^{10} US gal)
- Tarago Reservoir, Neerim South — 37,580 megalitres (8.27×10^{9} imp gal; 9.93×10^{9} US gal)
- Thomson River Dam, Thomson — 1,068,000 megalitres (2.35×10^{11} imp gal; 2.82×10^{11} US gal)
- Upper Yarra Reservoir, Reefton — 200,000 megalitres (4.4×10^{10} imp gal; 5.3×10^{10} US gal)
- Yan Yean Reservoir, Yan Yean — 30,000 megalitres (6.6×10^{9} imp gal; 7.9×10^{9} US gal)

== Small service reservoirs ==
- Beaconsfield Reservoir, Officer
- Bittern Reservoir, Tuerong
- Cheltenham Reservoir, Cheltenham
- Cranbourne Service Reservoir, Cranbourne
- Dandenong Reservoir, Belgrave
- Darebin Reservoirs, Reservoir
  - Number 1
  - Number 2
  - Number 3
- Frankston Reservoir, Frankston South
- Mitcham Reservoir, Mitcham
- Moorabbin Reservoir, Bentleigh East
- Mornington Reservoir, Mount Eliza
- Mt. View Reservoir, Glen Waverley
- St. Albans Reservoir, St. Albans
- Surrey Hills Reservoir, Surrey Hills
- Tyabb Reservoir, Tyabb

== Gallery ==
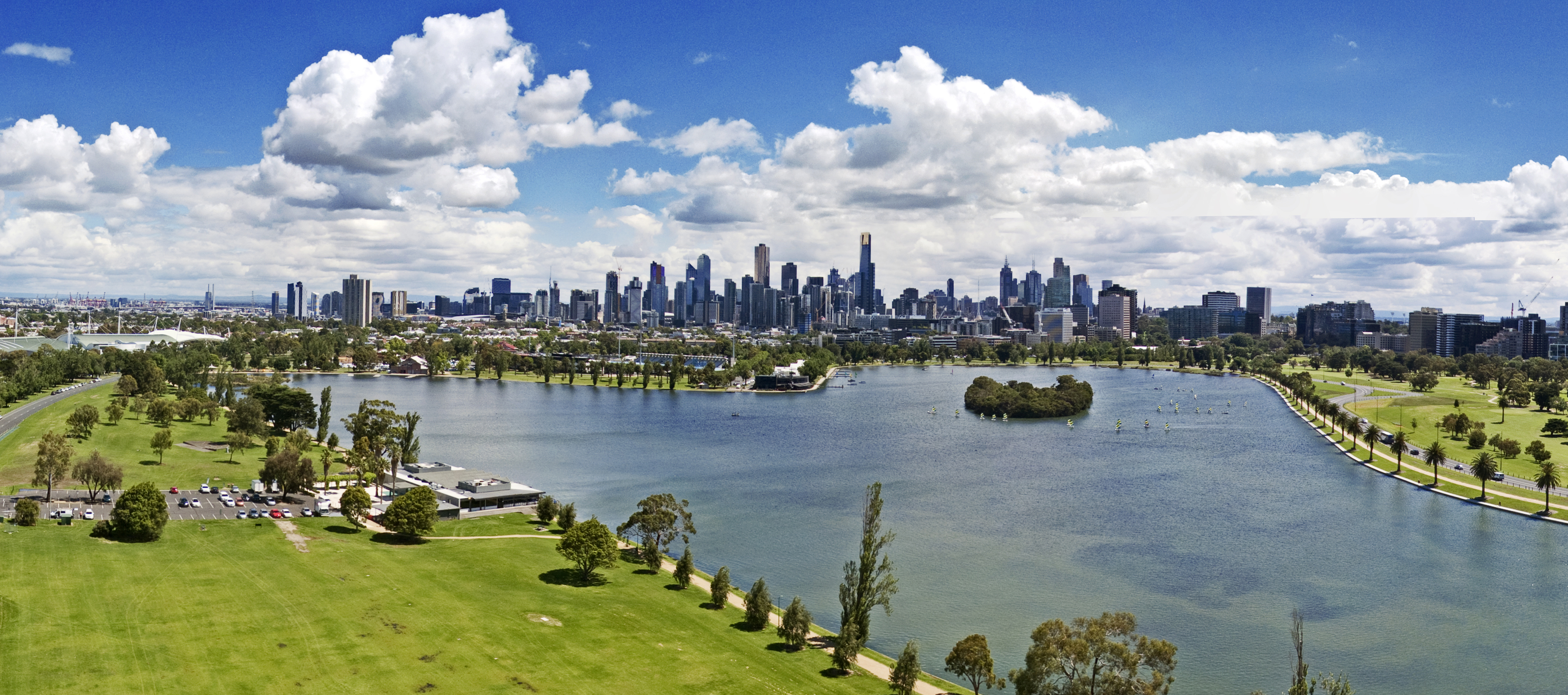
Albert Park Lake

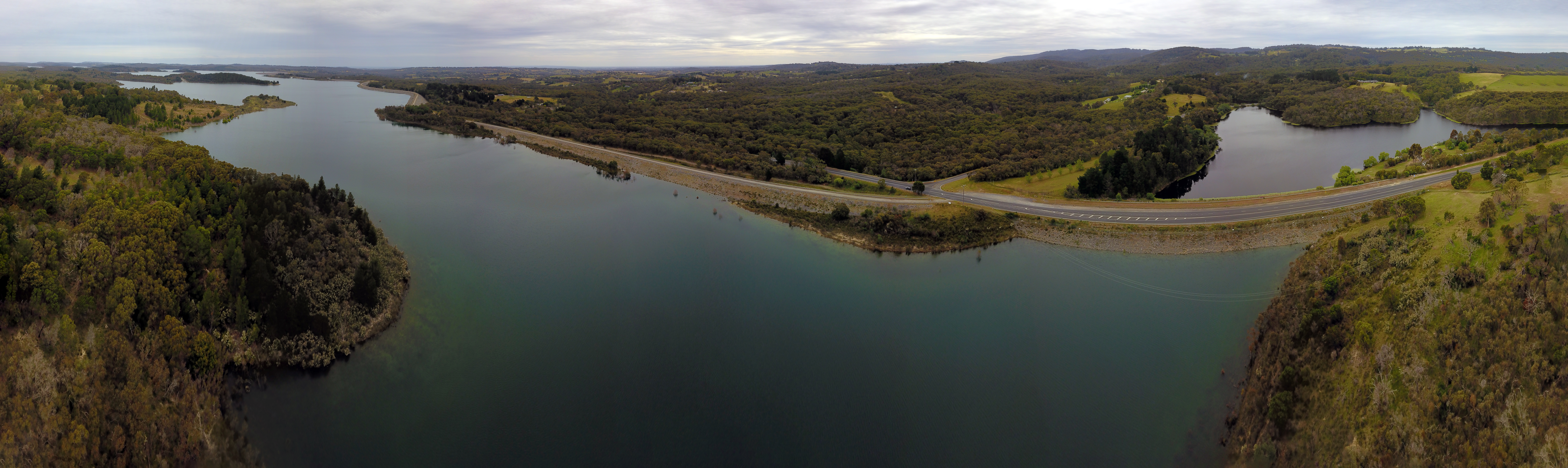
Aura Vale Lake Aerial Panorama

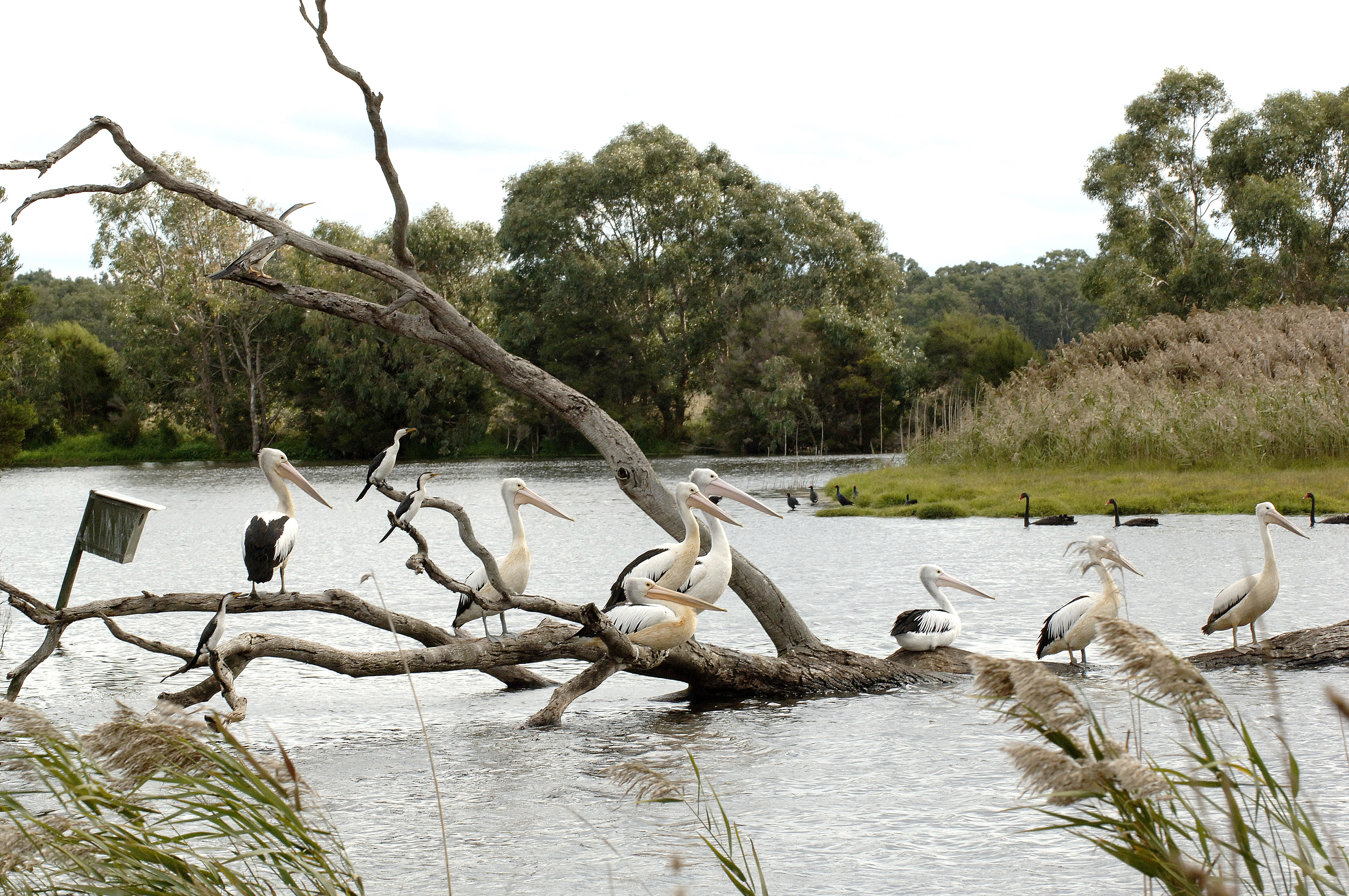
Braeside Park

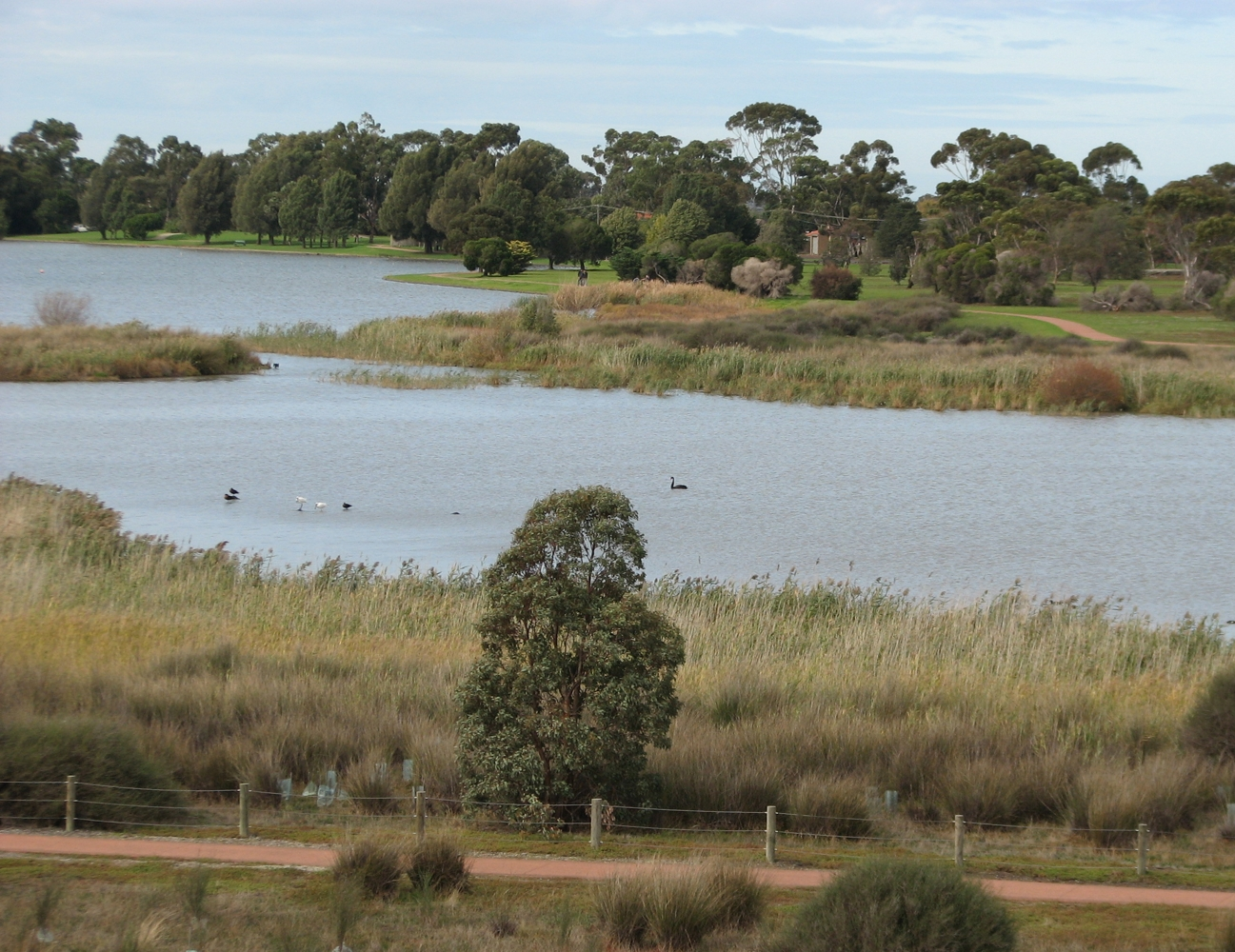
Cherry Lake

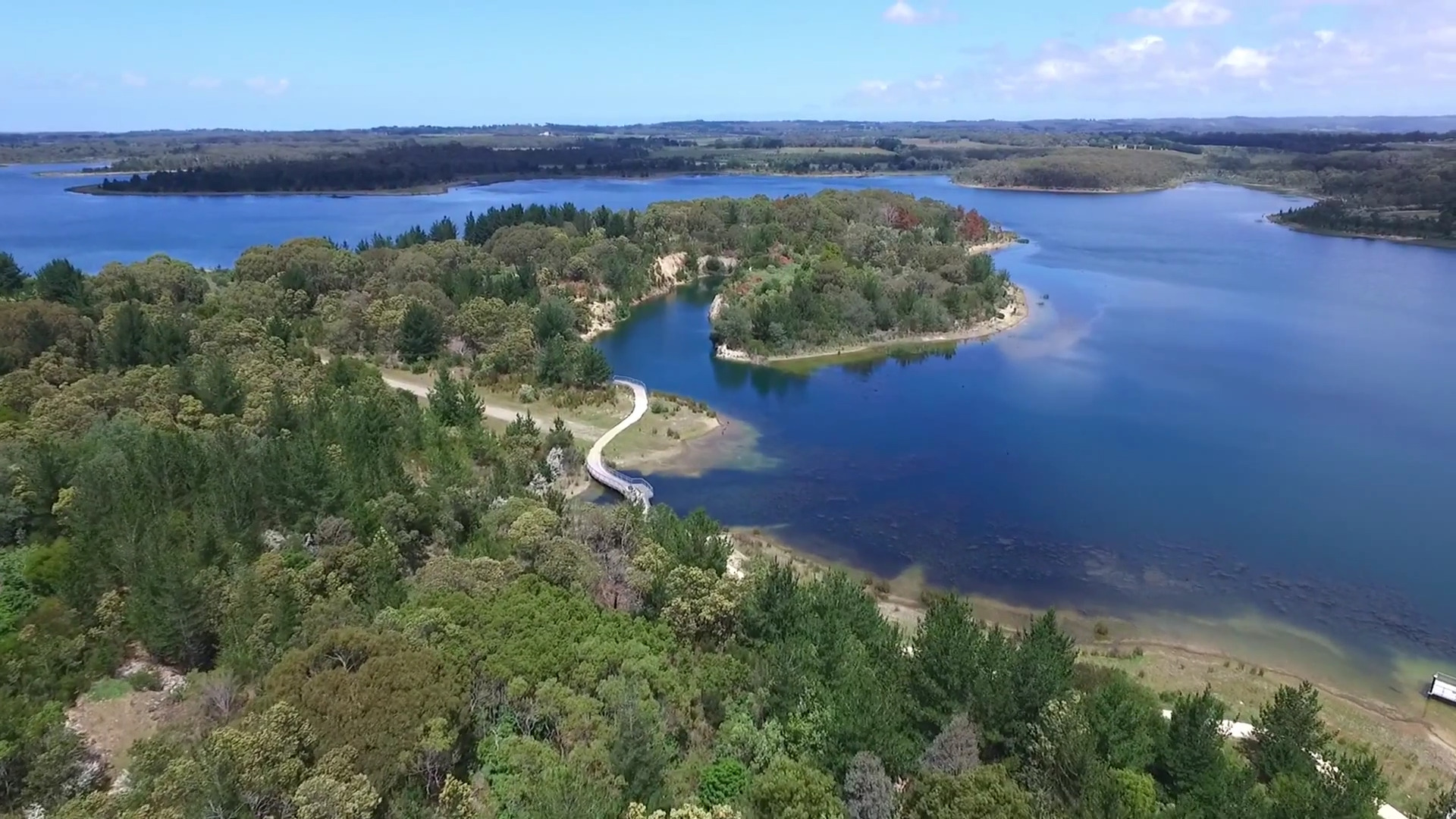
Devilbend Reservoir

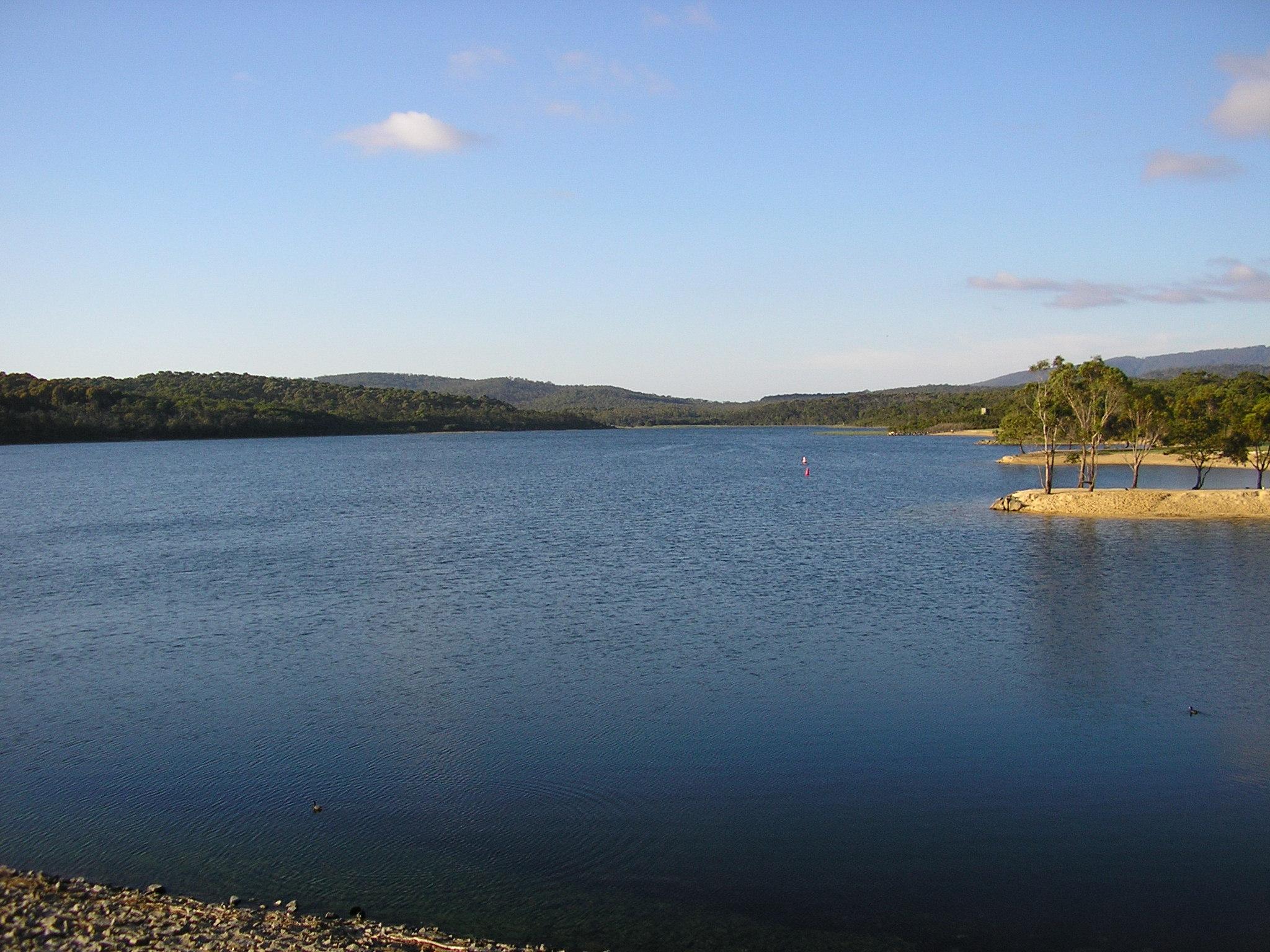
Lysterfield Lake

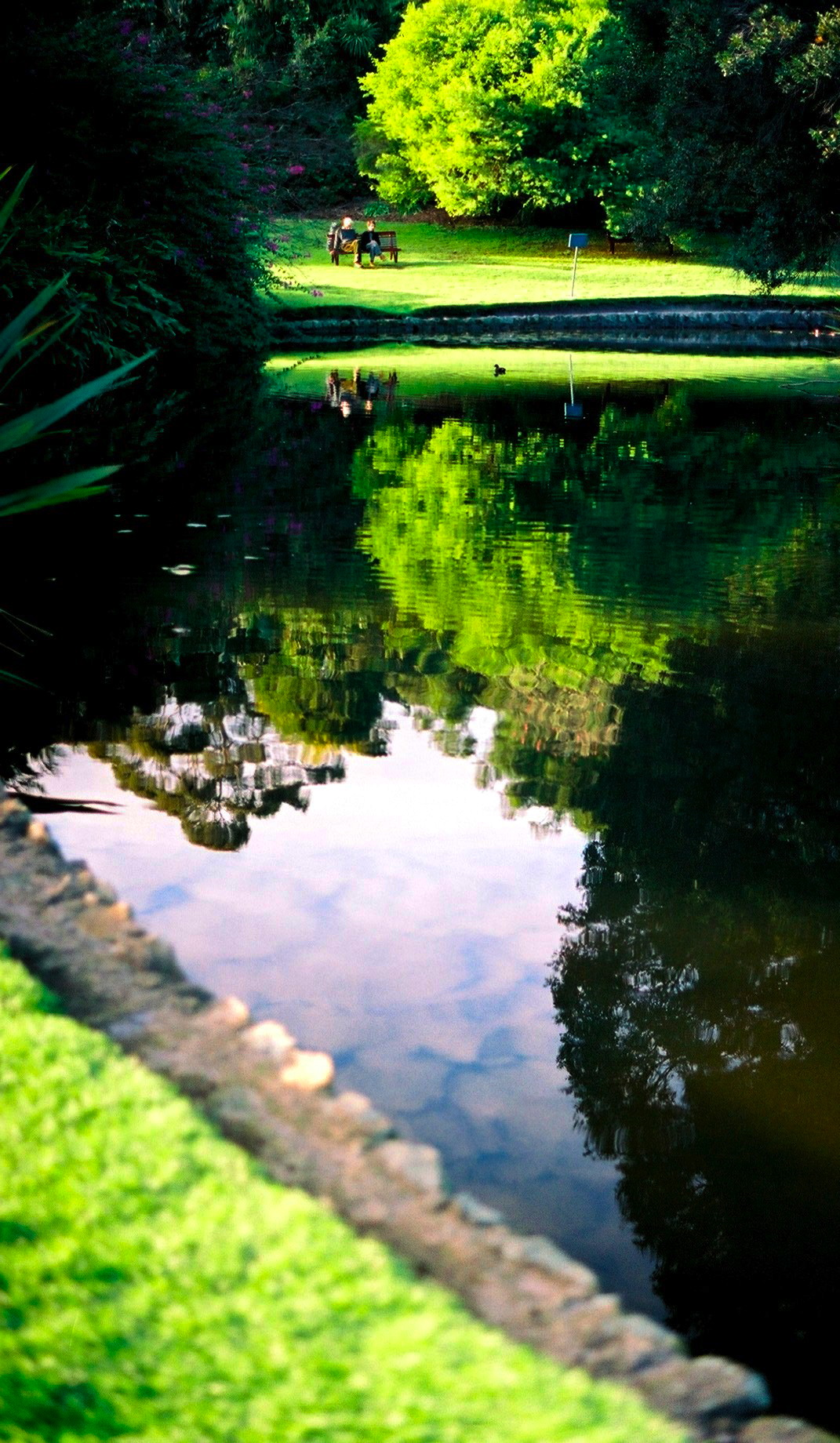
Nympheas Lake

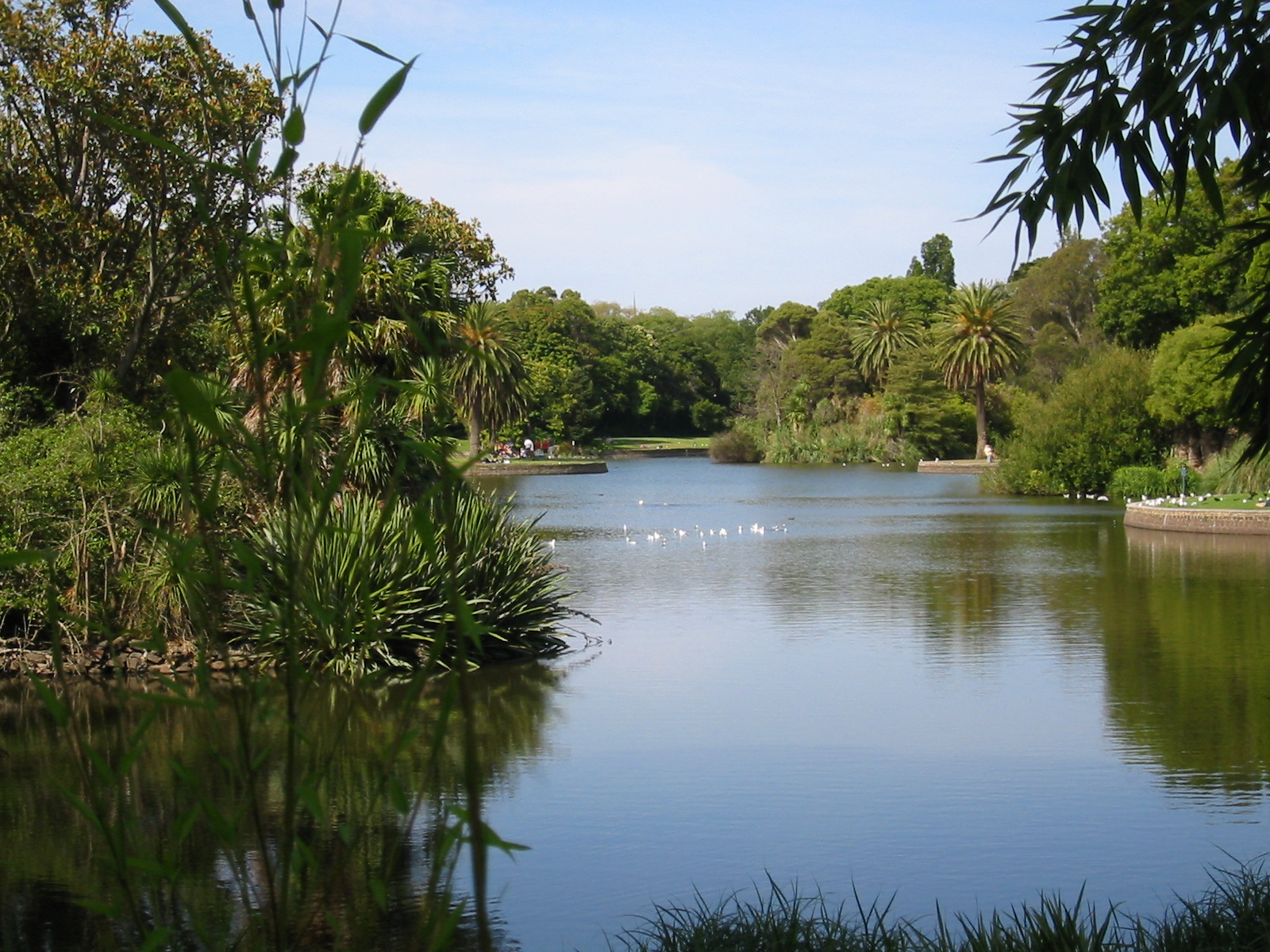
Ornamental Lake, Royal Botanic Gardens

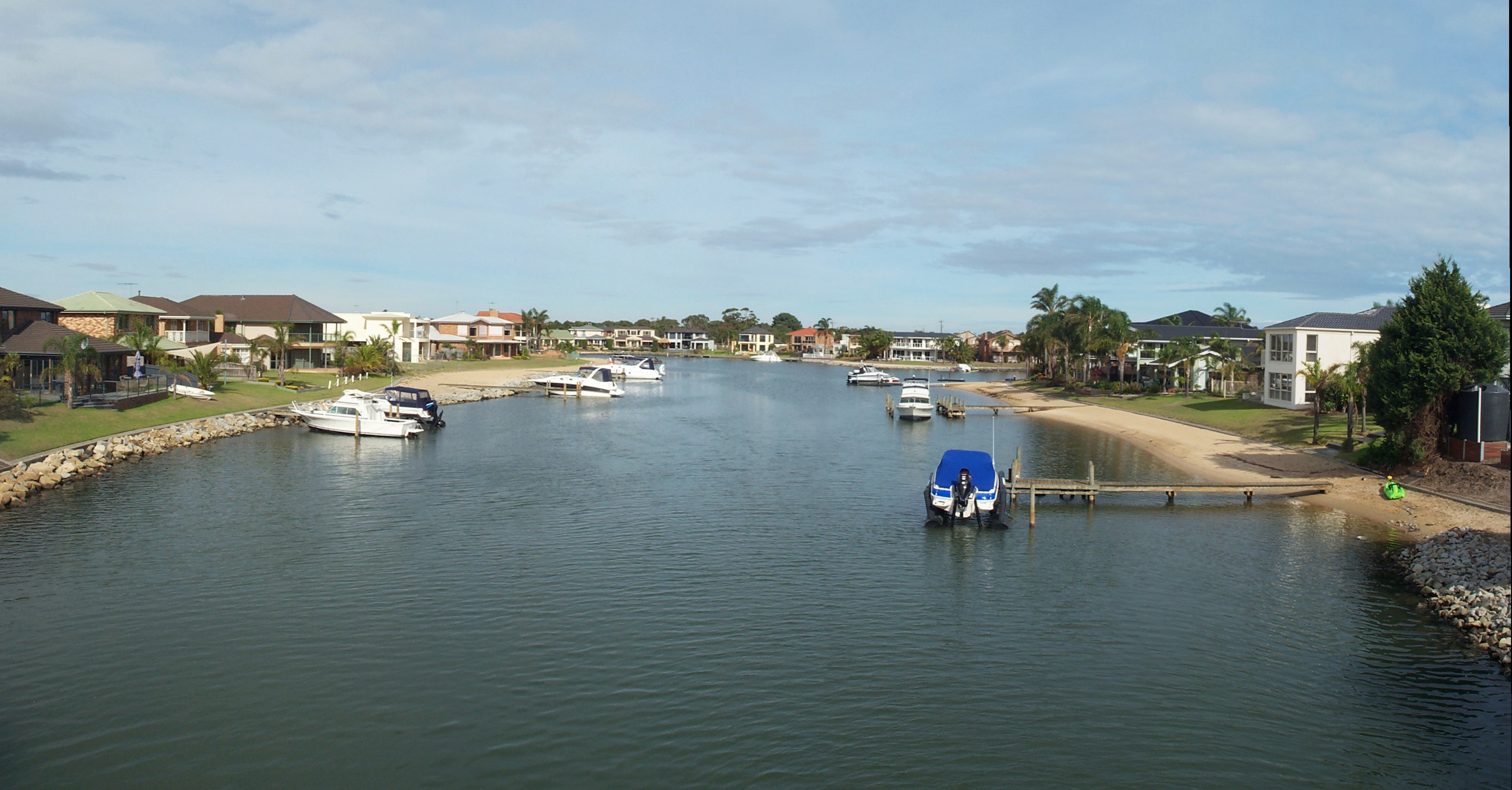
Patterson Lakes

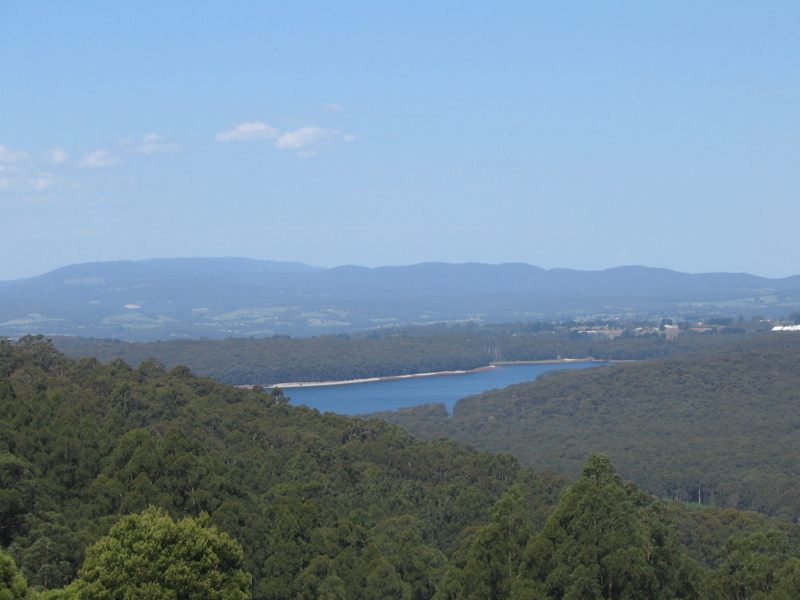
Silvan Reservoir

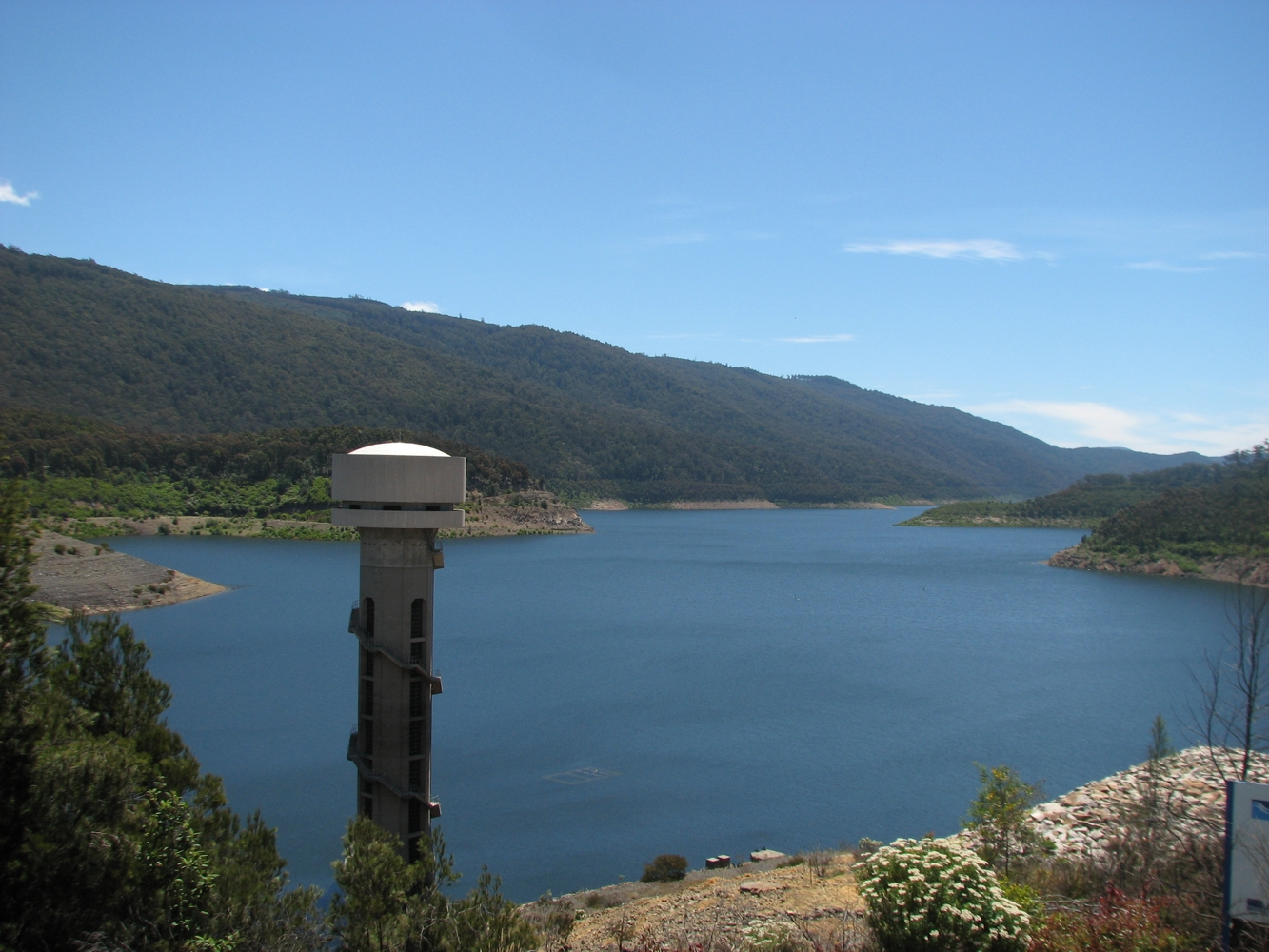
Thomson Reservoir

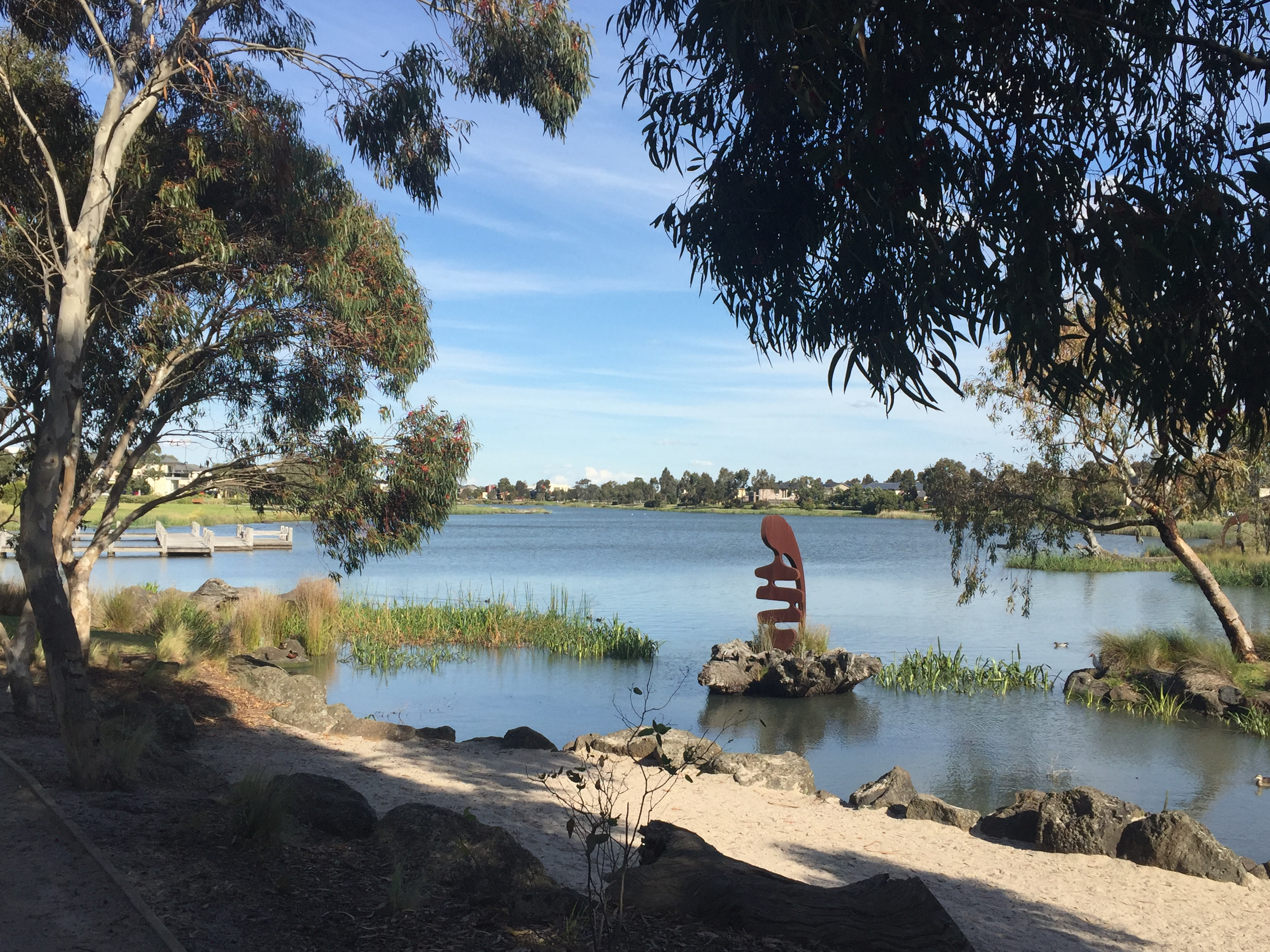
Waterways Lake

== See also ==
- List of reservoirs and dams in Australia
- Melbourne Water
- Yarra River
