= Him =

Him or HIM may refer to:

== Arts and entertainment ==
=== Film ===
- Him (1974 film), a gay pornographic film
- Him (2025 film), an American sports horror film

=== Television ===
- "Him" (Buffy the Vampire Slayer), a TV episode
- Him (The Powerpuff Girls), a villain in the TV series The Powerpuff Girls
- Him (Wonder Showzen character)
- How It's Made, a program made in Canada
- Him (TV series), a drama

=== Music ===
- HIM (Finnish band), a Finnish gothic rock band
- HiM (American band), an American post-rock group
- HIM, a Japanese band known for singing "Heaven" for the YAT Anshin! Uchū Ryokō anime
- The Him, a Dutch DJ duo and electronic music production team
- Him (album), 2006, by Michael Sweet
- "Him" (Rupert Holmes song), a 1980 song
- "Him" (Sarah Brightman song), a 1983 song
- HIM International Music, a Taiwanese record label established in 1999
- "Him", a song by James Marriott from No Left Brain
- "Him", a song by Lily Allen from It's Not Me, It's You
- "HIM", a song by Sam Smith from The Thrill of It All
- "HIM", a song by Tokio Hotel from 2001

=== Other uses in arts and entertainment ===
- Him (Cummings play), 1927, by E. E. Cummings
- Him (Walken play), a 1995 play about Elvis Presley written by Christopher Walken
- Him, an alternative name for Adam Warlock in the Marvel Comics universes
- Him, a 2015 book by Sarina Bowen and Elle Kennedy, the first book in the series of the same name

== Other uses ==
- Him, the objective form of the English-language pronoun he
- Health information management practice
- Heritage International Ministries, a hotel and convention center in Fort Mill, South Carolina
- Hingurakgoda Airport (IATA code), an airport in Hingurakgoda, Sri Lanka
- His Imperial Majesty or Her Imperial Majesty, imperial styles
- Hot Ionized Medium, a component of the interstellar medium
- Guard Corps (Haganah), a pre-Israel Jewish paramilitary organization
- Molde University College (Høgskolen i Molde), Norway
- Scanning helium ion microscope, an imaging technology

== See also ==
- Hima (disambiguation)
- Hymn (disambiguation)
- Hiim, a Norwegian surname
