= Hemalata =

Hemalata or Hemalatha may refer to:

- Hemalatha, an Indian actress in Tamil cinema
- Hemalatha (Telugu actress), an Indian actress in Telugu cinema
- Hemalatha Lavanam (1932–2008), Indian social reformer and writer
- S. Hemalatha Devi, Indian politician
- Dayalan Hemalatha, Indian cricketer

== See also ==
- Hema (disambiguation)
- Lata (disambiguation)
