= Hymn (disambiguation) =

A hymn is a song written as a song of praise, adoration or prayer.

Hymn, hymns, or hymnus may also refer to:

== Music ==
- National hymn, a musical composition recognized by a nation's government as the official national song
- Hymn: Sarah Brightman In Concert, a concert tour
- Hymns (band), an American indie rock band
- Hymn (Sibelius), a 1896 choral song

=== Albums ===
- Hymn (album) or the title song, by Sarah Brightman, 2018
- Hymns (2nd Chapter of Acts album), 1986
- Hymns (Bloc Party album), 2016
- Hymns (Corey Glover album), 1998
- Hymns (Godflesh album), 2001
- Hymns (Loretta Lynn album), 1965
- Hymns (Michael W. Smith album), 2014
- Hymns (Out of Eden album), 2005
- Hymns (Tennessee Ernie Ford album), 1957
- Hymns (EP), by Anathallo, 2004
- Hymns, by Beth Nielsen Chapman, 2004
- Hymns: A Place of Worship, by 4Him, 2000
- Hymns That Are Important to Us, by Joey + Rory, 2016

=== Songs ===
- "Hymn" (Celine Dion song), 2015
- "Hymn" (Kesha song), 2017
- "Hymn" (Moby song), 1994
- "Hymn" (Ultravox song), 1982
- "Hymn", by Barclay James Harvest from Gone to Earth, 1977
- "Hymn", by James Taylor from One Man Dog, 1972
- "Hymn", by Janis Ian from Aftertones, 1976
- "Hymn", by Patti Smith Group from Wave, 1979
- "Hymn", by Pedro the Lion from Whole, 1997
- "Hymn", by Peter Paul and Mary from Late Again, 1968
- "Hymn", by Jars of Clay from Much Afraid, 1997
- "Hymn", by Kevin Ayers from Bananamour, 1973, later covered by Ultramarine & David McAlmont
- "Hymn", a 2025 track by Toby Fox from Deltarune Chapters 3+4 OST from the video game Deltarune

== Mythology ==
- Hymnus (Greek mythology), a shepherd in Nonnus' Dionysiaca
- Hymnus, in Roman mythology, one of the four sons of Entoria fathered by Saturn

== Other ==
- "Hymn" (poem) or Cædmon's Hymn, a 7th-century Anglo-Saxon poem
- Hymn (software), a program to decrypt iTunes music files

== See also ==
- Him (disambiguation)
- Hymns II (disambiguation)
