= Lighthouse Christian College =

- Axilla Mea Iusta Lucerna (School of Light)
- The school's emblem, designed by R. MacDonald in 1995

Location
- 927 Springvale Road, Keysborough, Victoria; Australia; 38°00′05″S 145°08′34″E

Information
- Type: private, co-educational early learning primary and secondary day school
- Motto: Learn of me (Matthew 11:29)
- Religious affiliation: Christianity
- Established: 1989; 37 years ago
- Founder: Pastor Richard Warner
- Sister school: Lighthouse Christian College (Cranbourne) Boraelis Christian College (Townsville)
- Principal: Wing Hoe Leong
- Faculty: 6
- Years: Early learning and K–12
- Enrolment: 827
- Student to teacher ratio: 25:1
- Campus: Keysborough
- Houses: Luther, Ten-Boom and Wesley
- Colors: Navy blue, Yellow and White
- Sports: Football, Basketball, Volleyball, Netball, Badminton, AFL, Table Tennis
- Mascot: The Lighthouse
- Nickname: Lighthouse (LCC)
- Annual tuition: $6593 (P-4), $7247 (5-6), $8211 (7-10), $9038 (11-12)
- Website: www.lighthouse.vic.edu.au//

The Lighthouse Christian College is a private,Christian,co-educational early learning primary and secondary day school located in the Melbourne suburb of Keysborough, Victoria, Australia.

Lighthouse Christian College has over 800 students enrolled as of 2026.

In 2020, the school received criticism for their COVID mask policies

In 2025, the school ranked within the top 50 secondary schools in Victoria.

== See also ==
- List of schools in Victoria
- List of high schools in Victoria
