= Hima =

Hima may refer to:

== People ==
- Dervish Hima (1872–1928), Albanian politician
- Fatmir Hima (born 1954), Albanian footballer
- Mariama Hima (born 1951), Nigerien film director, ethnologist and politician
- Moustapha Hima (born 1992), Nigerien boxer
- Yacine Hima (born 1984), Algerian football player
- Djibrilla Hima Hamidou, Nigerien military officer
- Hima Das (born 2000), Indian sprinter
- Hima Douglas (born 1946 or 1947), Niuean broadcaster, politician, and diplomat
- Hima Kohli, Indian judge
- Hima Shankar, Indian actress

== Places ==
- Hima, Jumla, a rural municipality in Karnali province, Nepal
- Hima, Uganda, a town in Kasese District
- Lake Hima, a lake in the municipality of Masoarivo, Belo sur Tsiribihina, Madagascar

== Other uses ==
- Hima language
- Hima people, an ethnic group in the Great Lakes region of East Africa
- Hima (environmental protection), an Arabic word meaning "inviolate zone" (boundary), and a system of environmental protection in Islam
- Hima Dushanbe, a football club from Dushambe, Tajikistan
- HIMA Youth Initiative (styled HIMA!), an Armenian youth initiative
- Histopathology image analysis (HIMA), using automatic equipment to evaluate tissue samples
- Hima, the Khasi name for the traditional states of the Khasi people in the Khasi Hills, Meghalaya, India
- Harmony Intelligent Mobility Alliance, a collaborative automotive brand initiated by Chinese technology company Huawei

== See also ==
- Him (disambiguation)
- Hema (disambiguation)
