= Hema maps =

Hema Maps is an Australian-based mapping, navigation and publishing company. Their company headquarters is located in Braeside, Victoria. Hema Maps is a private limited company.

The company name Hema was decided upon by incorporating the first two letters of the names of the company's founders; Henry and Margaret Boegheim. Rob Boegheim replaced company founders Henry and Margaret Boegheim as Managing Director in 2007.

== History ==
Originally titled Hema Charts & Laminating, the business began as a laminating business that sold marine charts via bait and tackle shops throughout South East Queensland in 1983. The company's first creation was a map of Rockhampton.

Hema released their first Hema Navigator, the HN1, in 2008 which was Australia's very first portable navigation system for use both on and off-road. Hema HX-1 in 2017, HX-2 in 2022 and HX-2+ in 2024.

Hema 4x4 Explorer App in 2020 for Apple and Android devices. Users plan, navigate and share trips, overlanding and remote travel.

== See also ==
- onX Maps
