= Hema =

Hema may refer to:

- Hemā (mythology), a figure from Polynesian mythology
- HEMA (store), a Dutch chain of stores
- Hema (supermarket) (盒马), a supermarket chain in China
- Hema maps, an Australian map publisher
- Hema people, an ethnic group in the eastern Democratic Republic of the Congo
- Historical European martial arts
- (Hydroxyethyl)methacrylate, a monomer
- Marsa Alam International Airport (ICAO:HEMA)

== People with the given name ==
- Hema (actress), an Indian character actress in Telugu cinema
- Hemalatha, also credited as Hema, Indian actress in Tamil cinema
- Hema Malini, an Indian actress in Hindi cinema
- Hema Sardesai, an Indian playback singer from Goa

== See also ==
- Hima (disambiguation)
