= Waterways, Victoria =

Waterways
- Suburb
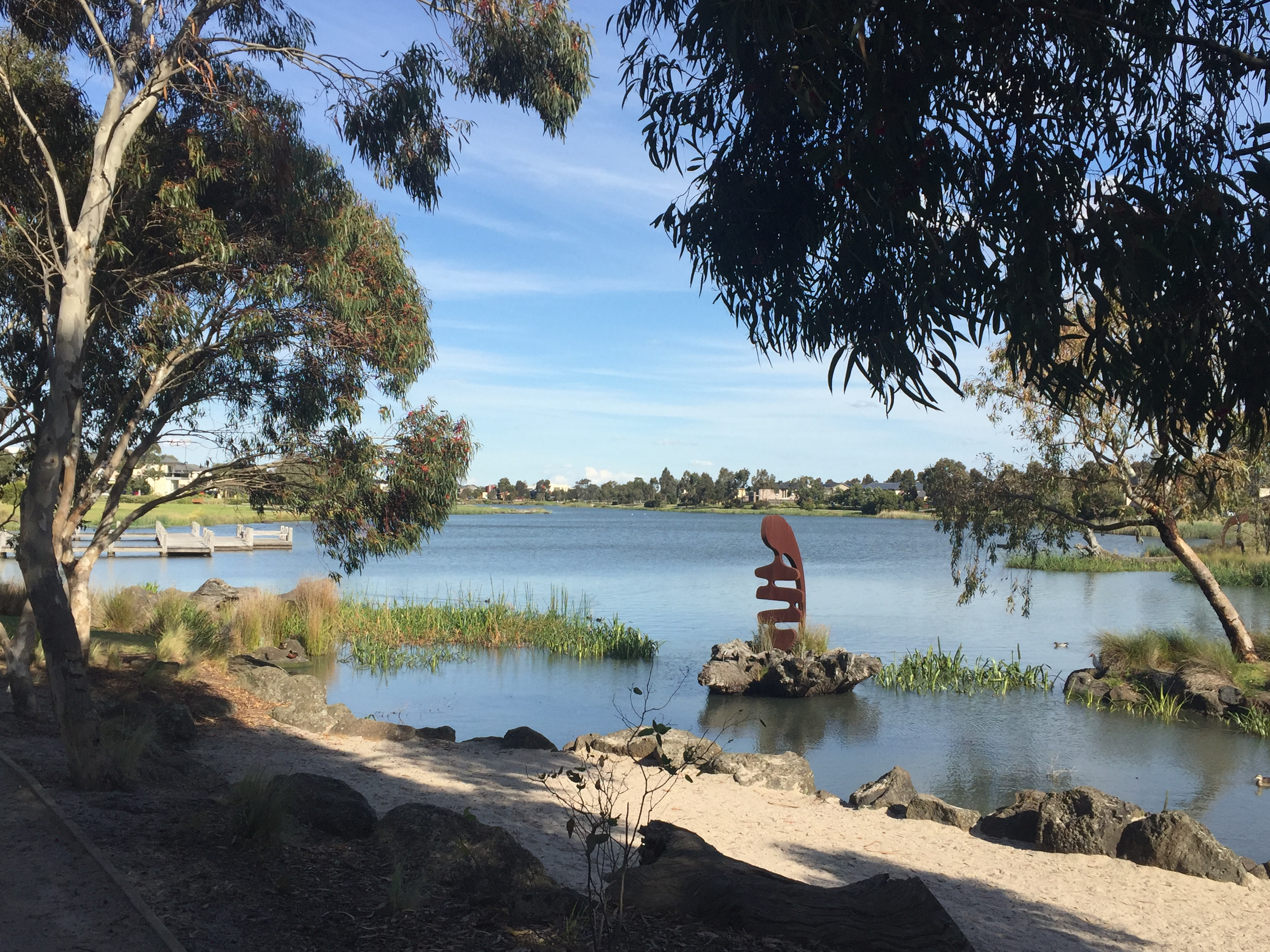
- Main Lake at Waterways, Victoria

- Interactive map of Waterways
- Coordinates: 38.016°S 145.130°E
- Country: Australia
- State: Victoria
- City: Melbourne
- LGA: City of Kingston
- Location: 25 km (16 mi) from Melbourne; 5 km (3.1 mi) from Mordialloc
- Established: 2002

Government
  - State electorate: Mordialloc
  - Federal division: Isaacs

Population
  - Total: 2,422 (2021 census)
- Postcode: 3195
Suburbs around Waterways
Braeside	Braeside	Keysborough
Braeside	Waterways	Keysborough
Aspendale Gardens	Aspendale Gardens	Bangholme

Waterways is a suburb in Melbourne, Victoria, Australia, 25 km (16 mi) south-east of Melbourne's Central Business District, located within the City of Kingston local government area. Waterways recorded a population of 2,422 at the 2021 census.

Originally a housing development, it is surrounded by the much larger suburbs of Braeside, Aspendale Gardens, Keysborough and Bangholme, and the Mornington Peninsula Freeway traverses the western side of the suburb. It is Australia's only suburb that's 20% parkland and 40% water, and over 46 hectares (110 acres) of wildlife sanctuary were artificially created in and around the old wetlands along the Mordialloc Creek (a tidal distributary of lower Dandenong Creek), hence the suburb's name.

The suburb's location is environmentally sensitive as it is situated directly between two important conservation areas, the Braeside Park and Edithvale Wetlands. Planning permits are strictly regulated and gardens monitored to prevent the introduction of foreign species that may become invasive and threaten the abundant native wildlife in the area. The Mornington Peninsula branch of the Bird Observers Club of Australia or PENBOC have documented 105 different species of birds in the area, and domestic cats are forbidden for this reason.

== History ==
Construction on Waterways Estate began in May 2000, due to end within five years. The name "Waterways" comes from a number of man-made lakes, lagoons and wetlands in and around the estate, which form an interconnected waterway to the Mordialloc Creek and a wildlife corridor connecting Braeside Park to its north and the Edithvale Wetlands to its south. Melbourne Water uses these waters as a filtration system for the (typically polluted) urban water flowing down from Dandenong and Mordialloc Creeks then into Port Phillip Bay.

Although the development was due to be completed in 2006, the developer applied for, and was subsequently granted permission from Kingston Council to increase the suburb's size. The final stage of the development, called Argyle, was completed in July 2011.

Waterways was rated higher than Toorak, Brighton or Canterbury – or anywhere else, apart from the 63 people living on South Wharf – in an index of socio-economic advantage compiled from the 2011 census.

== Water bodies ==
Waterways have multiple bodies of water interconnected by channels, underground aqueducts and wetlands, all surrounding an elongated land known as "the Island". Going clockwise from the northwest are the following:

- Sunset Lagoon — east of the Mordialloc Freeway, northwest of the island and immediately south of Governor Road.
- Portland Lagoon — west of Bowen Parkway and north of Portland Place, separated from Sunset Lagoon by a wetland and boardwalk.
- Waterways Lake — east of Bowen Parkway, north of the Island and south of Waterside Drive, the only waterbody of Waterways that allows non-motorized boating.
- St. Clair Lagoon — east of the Island and west of Springvale Road, separated from Waterways Lake by Island Point Avenue (an U-bend of Waterside Drive).
- Pelican Lagoon — north of Mordialloc Creek and south of the Island, separated from St. Clair Lagoon by a small peninsula.
- Black Swan Lagoon — north of Mordialloc Creek, southwest of the Island and east of Bowen Parkway, separated from Pelican Lagoon by a wetland and boardwalk.
- Parkway Lagoon — north of Mordialloc Creek, east of Bowen Parkway and partly overpassed by the Mordialloc Freeway, separated from Black Swan Lagoon by an isthmus with a dirt/muddy trail, the smallest of all lagoons.
- Westbridge Lagoon — east of Mordialloc Freeway and west of Bowen Parkway and the Island, separated from Sunset Lagoon by a grassland that can serve as a retarding basin in case of flooding.
- Mordi Yallock Lagoon — west of (and separated from the other waterbodies by) Mordialloc Freeway and north of Mordialloc Creek, the largest of all lagoons.

== Gallery ==
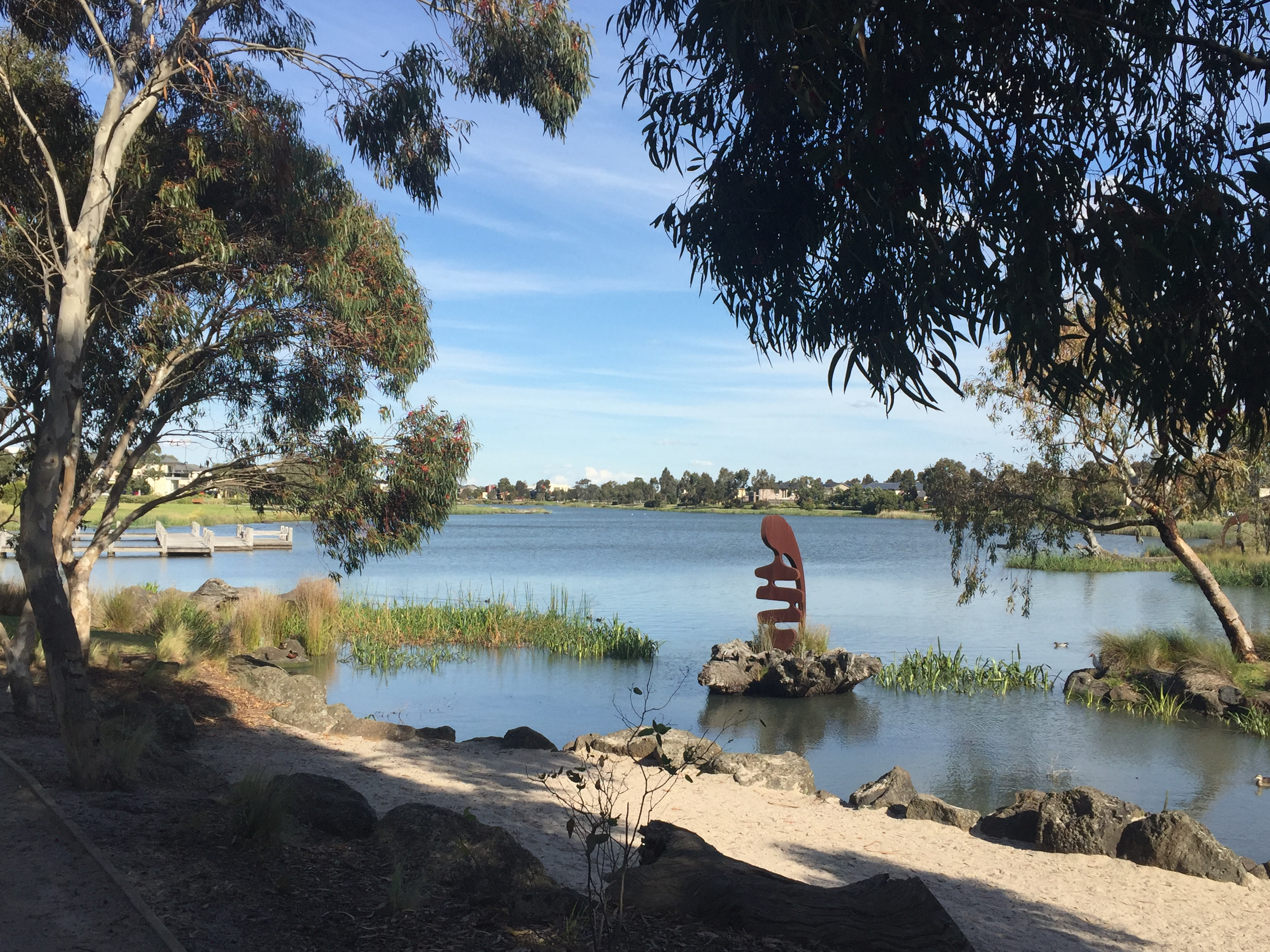
Waterways Lake, viewed from the lakeside cafe

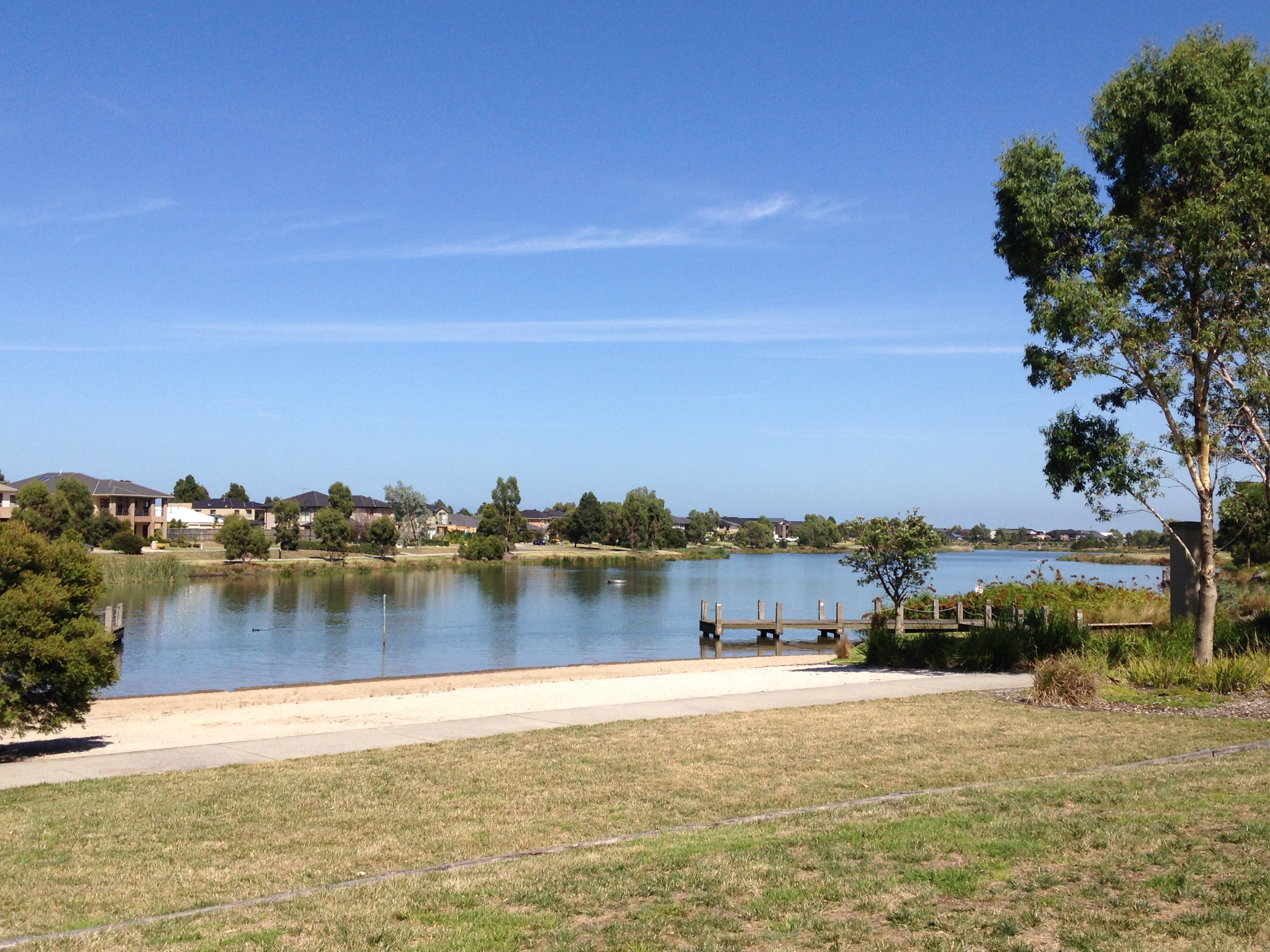
Waterways Lake, viewed from the eastern end

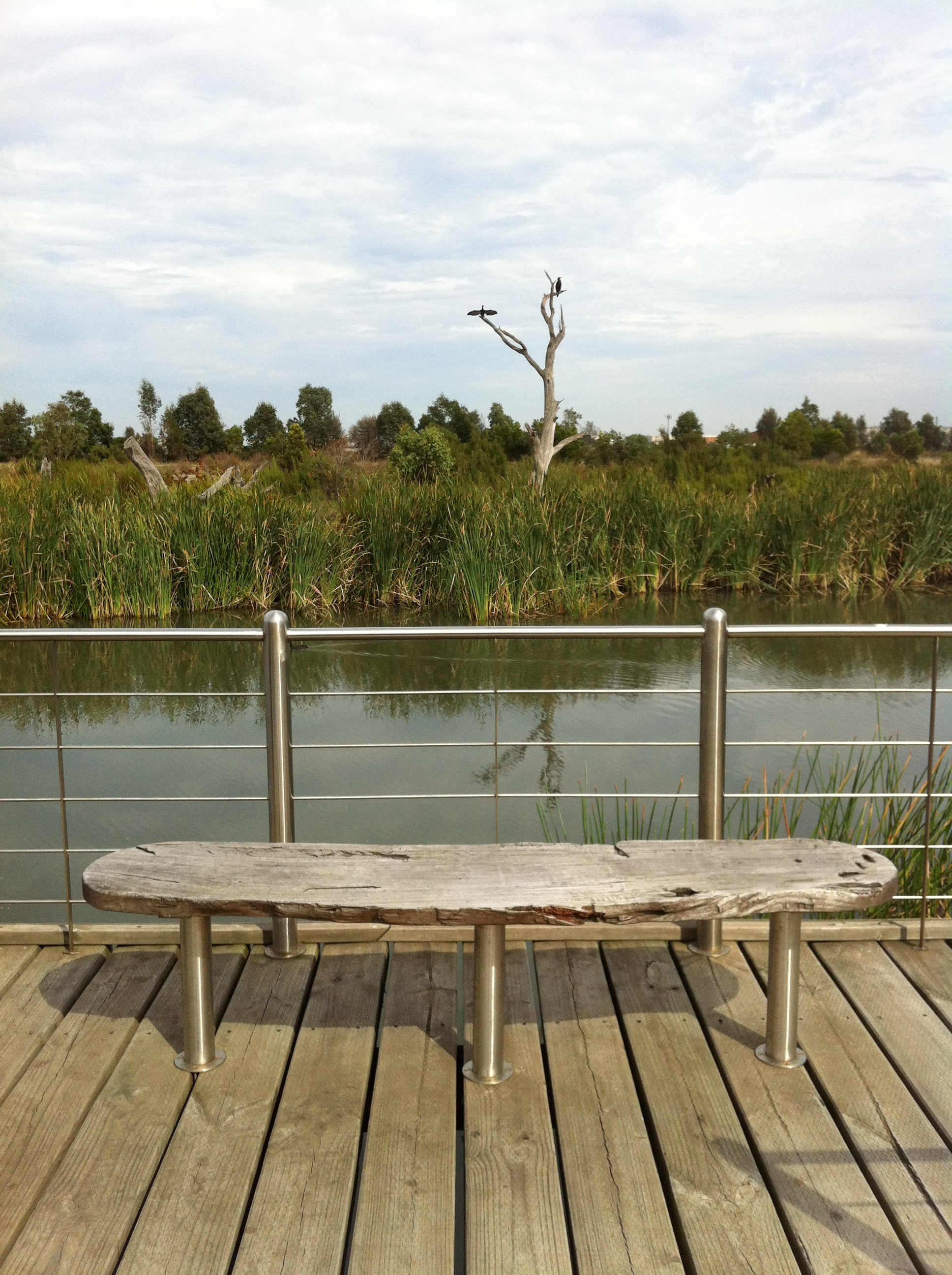
Sunset Lagoon, viewed from the boardwalk pier

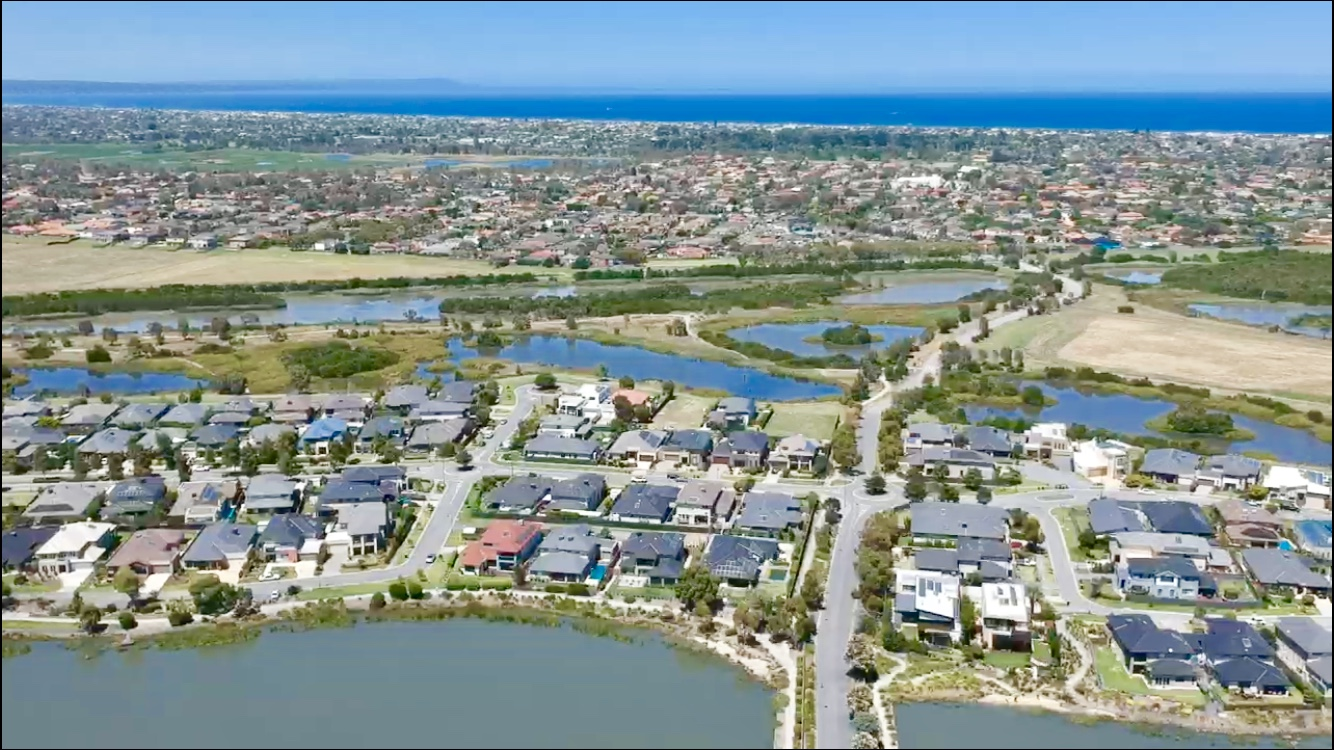
Aerial shot of western Waterways (prior to construction of the Peninsula Freeway), viewing southwest towards Port Phillip Bay

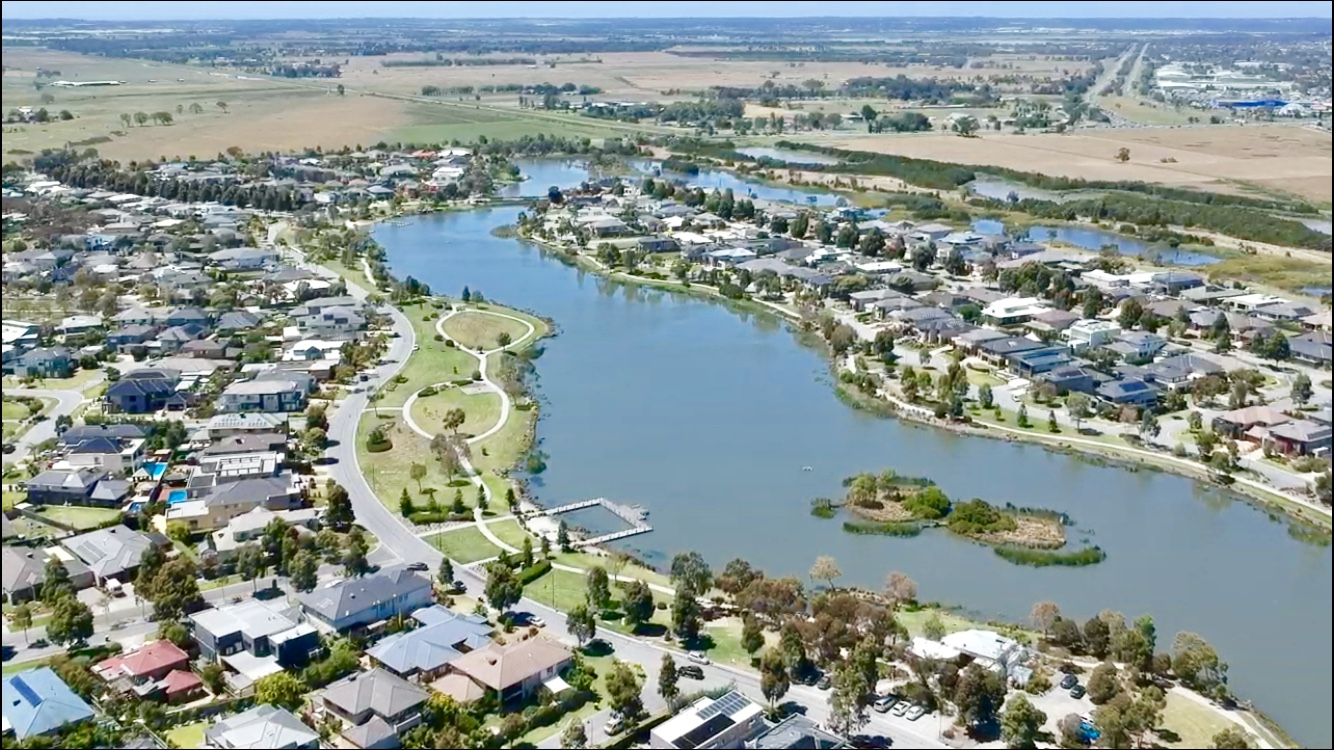
Aerial shot of eastern Waterways (prior to construction of the Peninsula Freeway), viewing southeast towards Bangholme

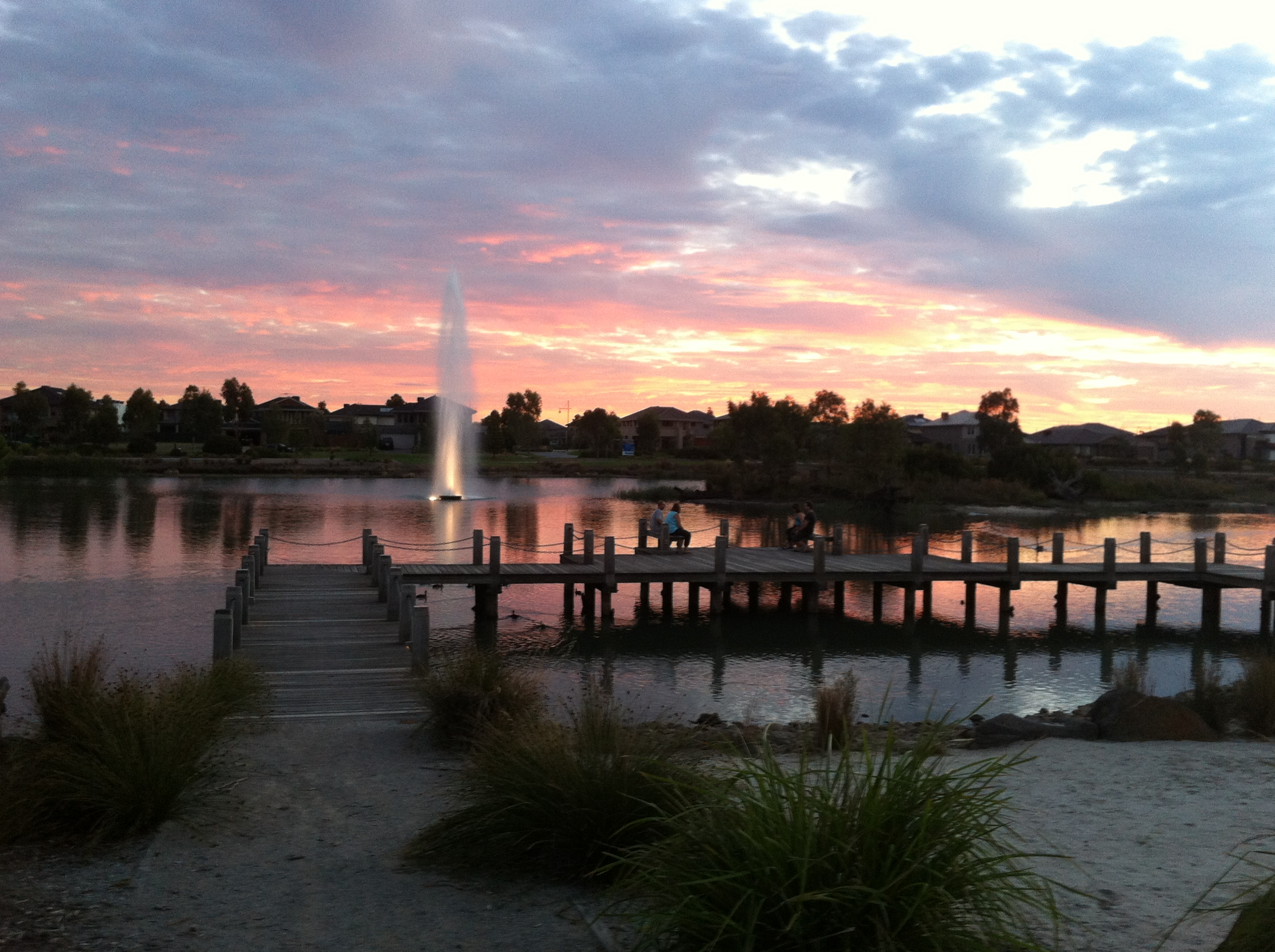
Sunset at Waterways Lake, viewed from the main pier on the north shore near Waterways Boulevard

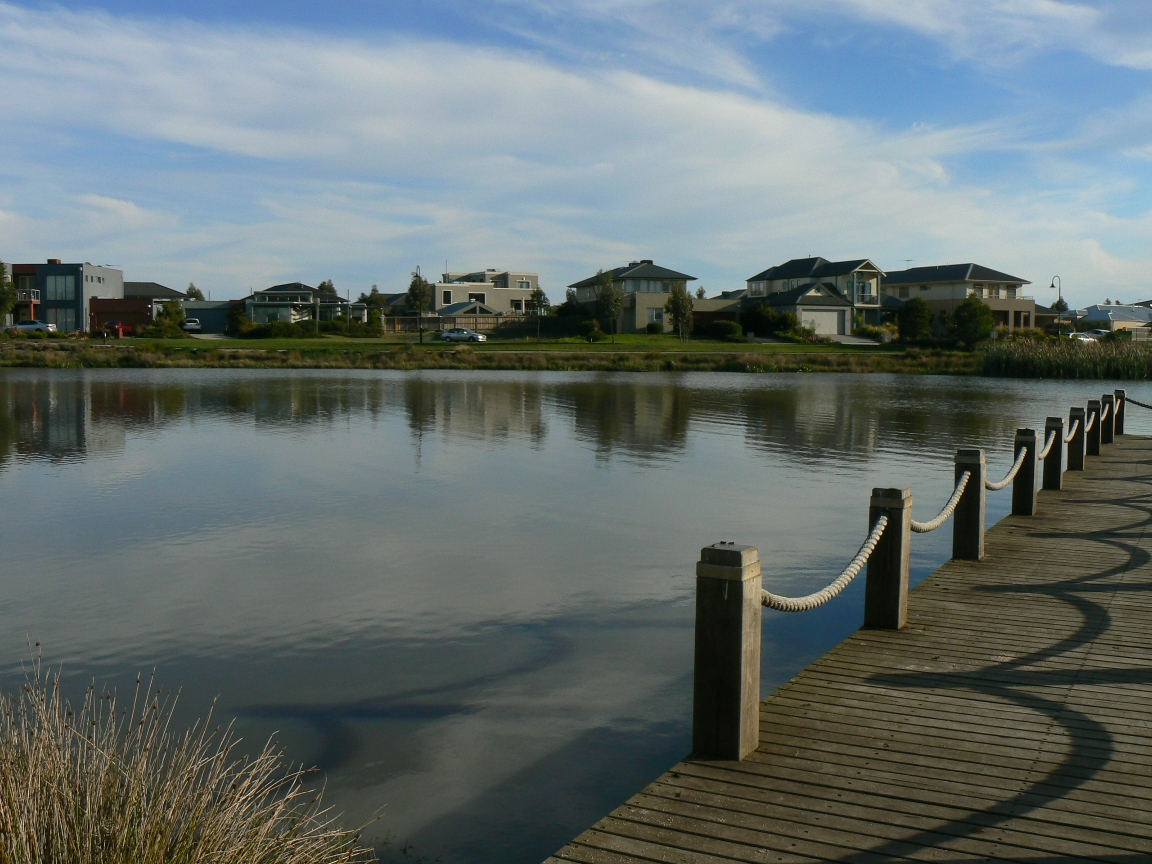
Lakeside residence, viewed across the lake from the main pier

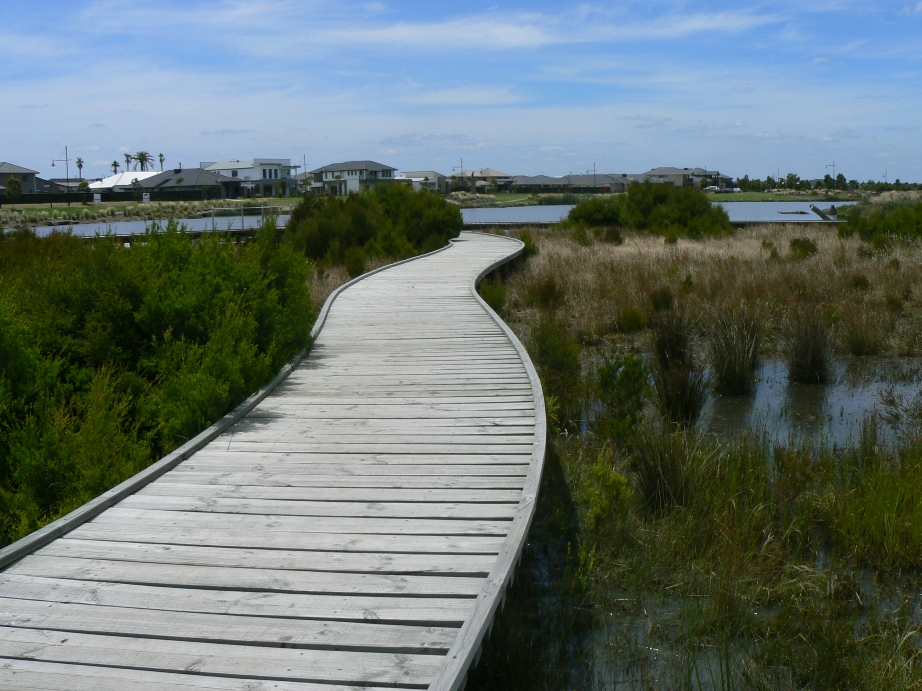
The boardwalk traversing the Portland Lagoon wetlands, viewed from the pier branch at the eastern end of Sunset Lagoon

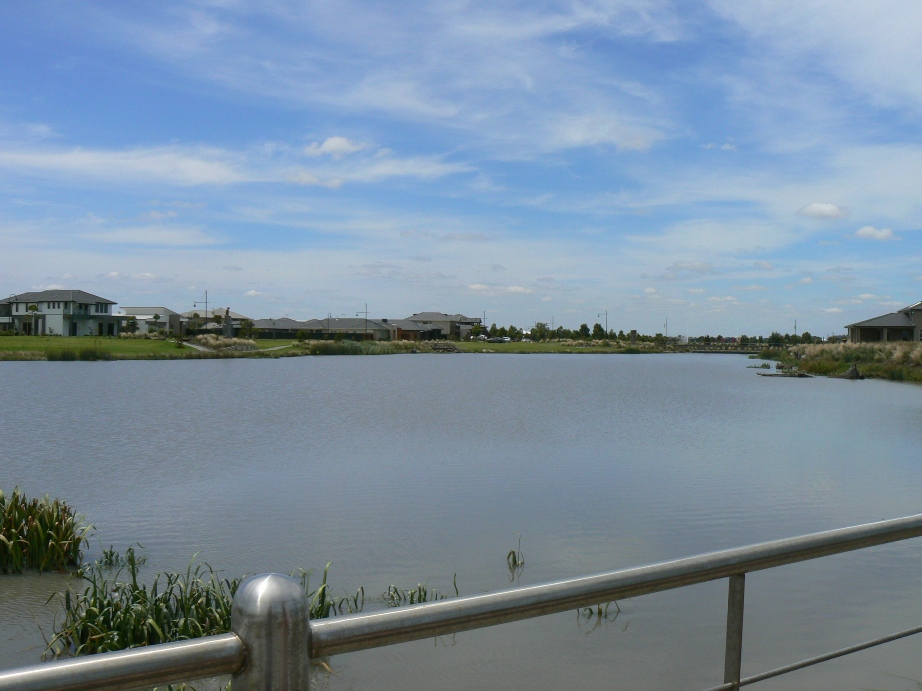
Portland Lagoon, viewed from the western boardwalk

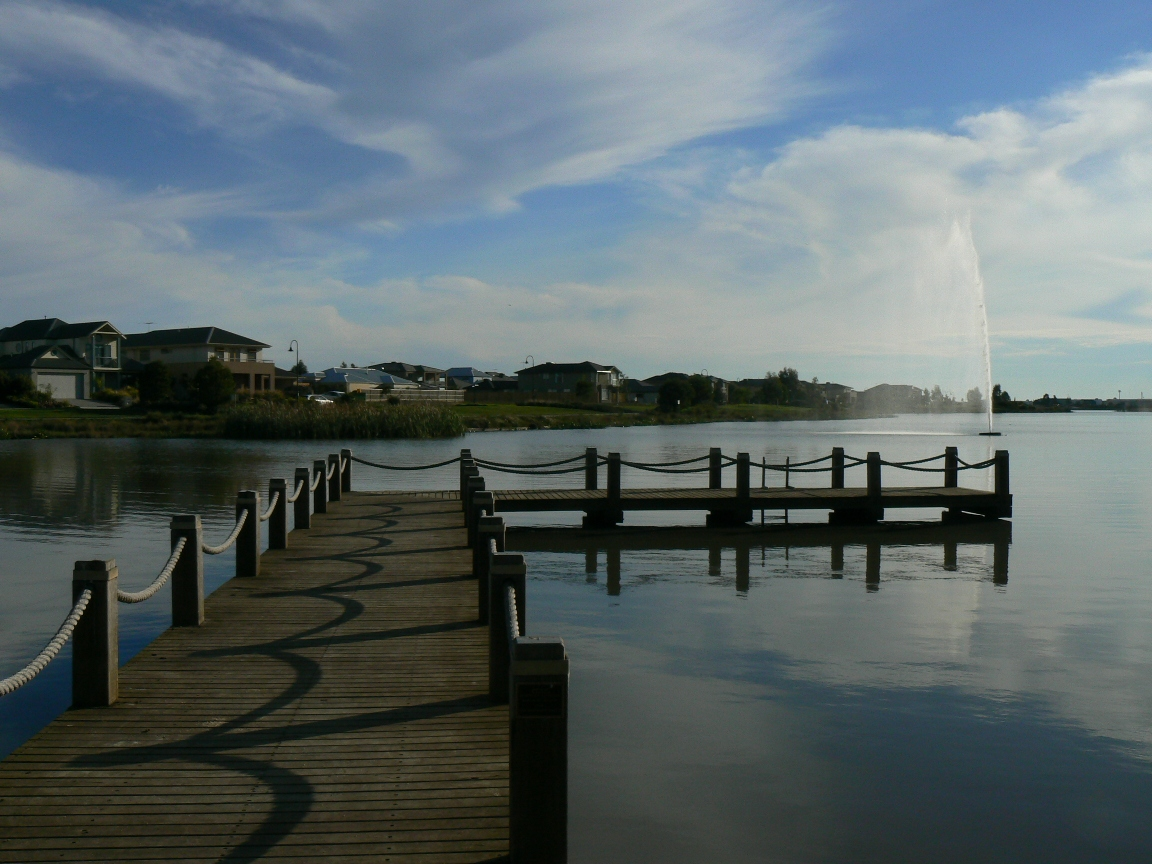
Pier at eastern end of Waterways Lake

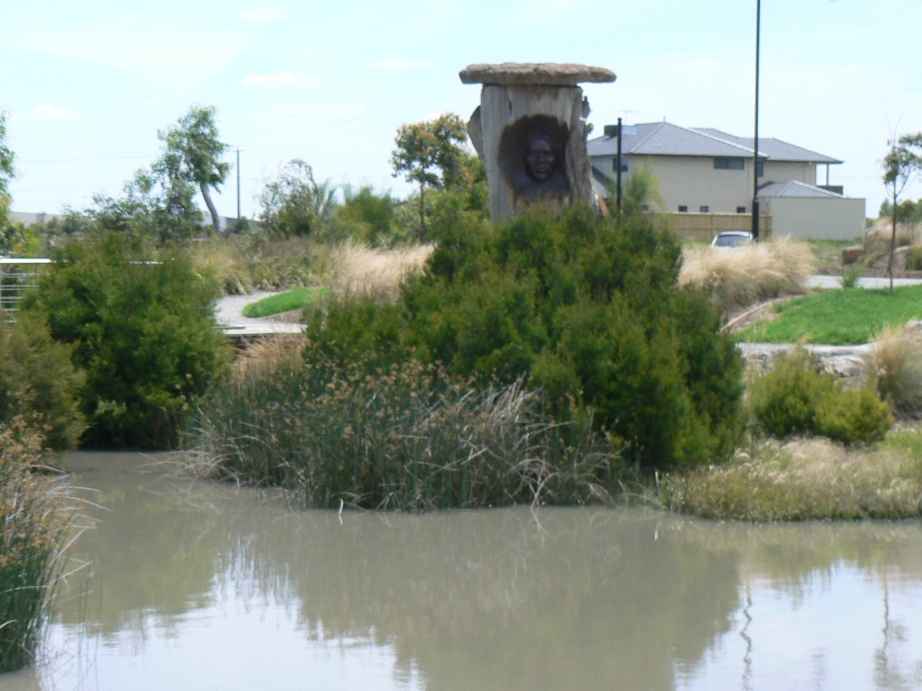
Waterways Art

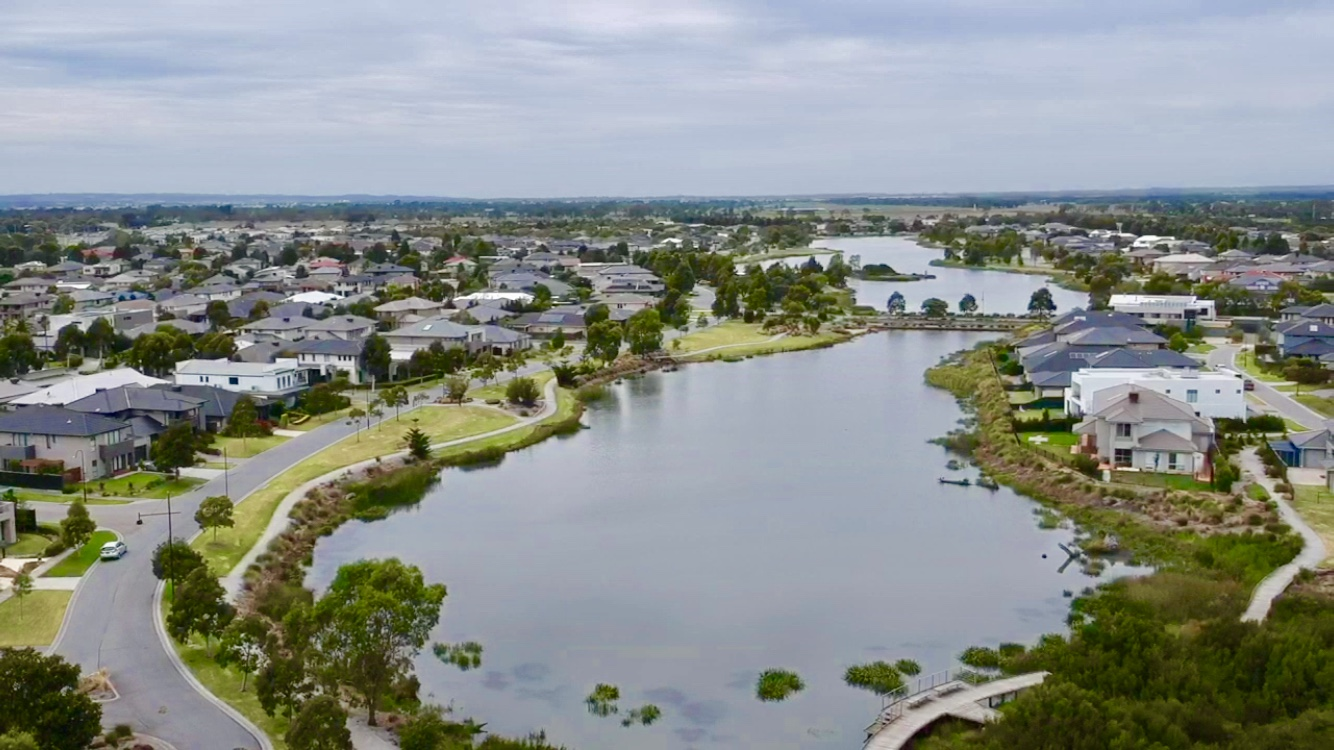
Aerial shot of Portland Lagoon (near) and Waterways Lake (far), viewed from the west
