= Hymns II =

Hymns II may refer to:

- Hymns II (2nd Chapter of Acts album), 1988
- Hymns II (Michael W. Smith album), 2016

== See also ==
- Hymns (disambiguation)
