= Hiim =

Hiim is a Norwegian surname. Notable people with the surname include:

- Anders Hiim (born 2002), Norwegian footballer
- Arild Hiim (1945–2024), Norwegian politician
