= Keysborough =

- Suburb
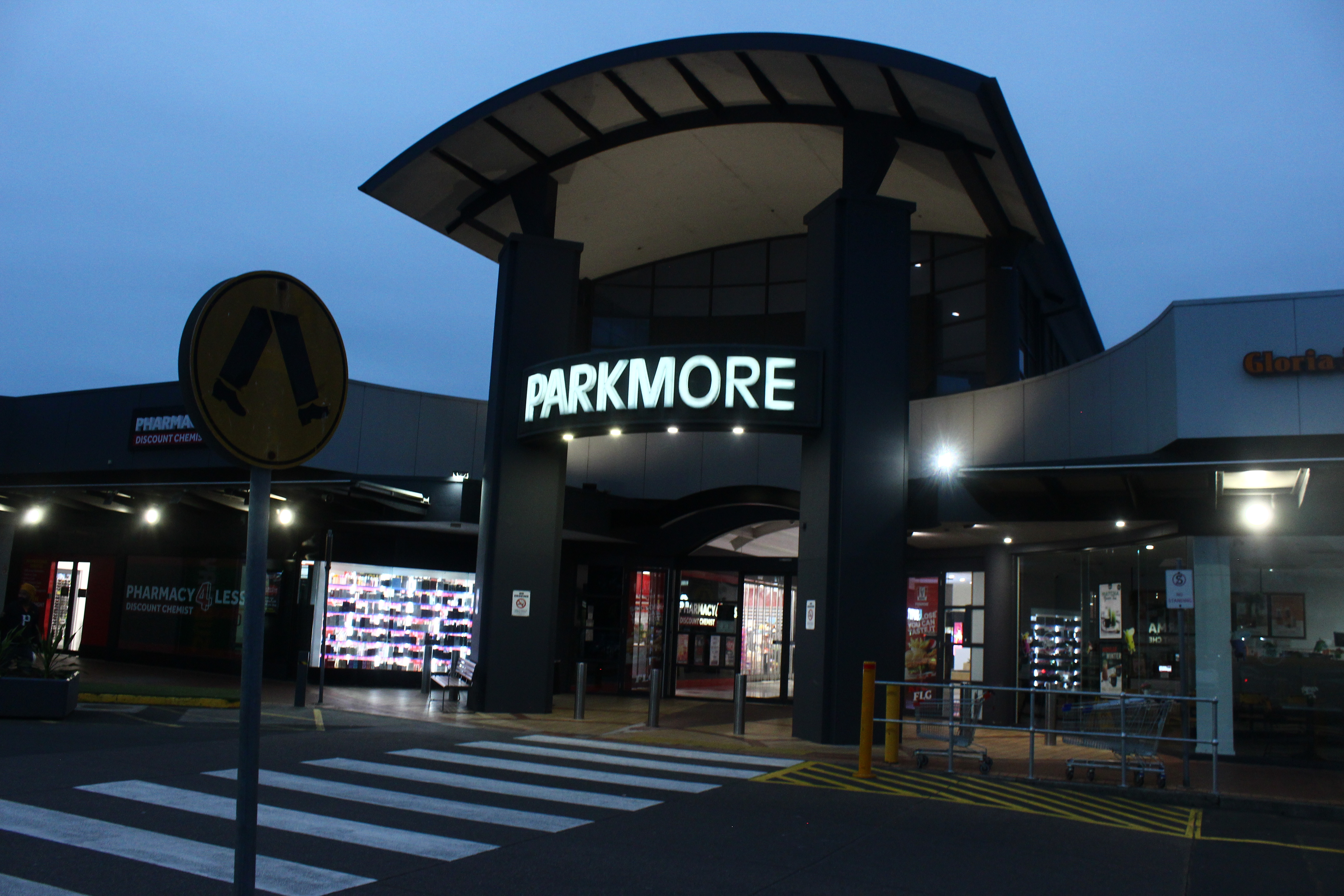
- Parkmore Shopping Centre, 2025

- Interactive map of Keysborough
- Coordinates: 37.989°S 145.172°E
- Country: Australia
- State: Victoria
- City: Melbourne
- LGA: City of Greater Dandenong
- Location: 27 km (17 mi) from Melbourne; 6 km (3.7 mi) from Dandenong

Government
  - State electorates: Clarinda; Dandenong; Mordialloc
  - Federal division: Isaacs

Area
  - Total: 21.8 km^{2} (8.4 sq mi)

Population
  - Total: 30,018 (2021 census)
  - Density: 1,377/km^{2} (3,566/sq mi)
- Postcode: 3173
Suburbs around Keysborough
Dingley Village	Springvale South	Noble Park
Braeside	Keysborough	Dandenong
Waterways	Bangholme	Dandenong South

Keysborough is a suburb in Melbourne, Victoria, Australia, 27 km (17 mi) southeast of the Melbourne central business district, located within the City of Greater Dandenong local government area. Keysborough recorded a population of 30,018 at the 2021 census.

== Geography ==
Keysborough is one of the largest suburbs in Melbourne by land area. Geographically, it is split into three sections, the southern portion of the suburb includes market gardens and semi-rural properties extending to its southern boundaries Pillars Road and the Mordialloc Creek; the middle portion of the suburb features large residential and industrial development which began in the 2000s; and the northern section of the suburb to its northern boundaries with Noble Park and Springvale South generally features housing predominantly built from the 1960s extending well into the 1990s. The suburb's western boundary is Springvale Road and eastern boundary is Dandenong Creek/EastLink.

== History ==
Keysborough was named after the Keys family who founded the town sometime after 1878. The local post office opened as Noble Park South on 27 November 1973 until being renamed to Keysborough in 1978.

As of 2002, the southern corner of the suburb was under development and new housing estates have been established, including The Keys, Hidden Grove, and Crystal Waters.

In 2017, Elmswood and Somerfield housing estates were under development in southern Keysborough.

== Religion ==
Keysborough has a gurudwara, a Turkish mosque, a Croatian Catholic Church and an Eastern Orthodox church

== Demographics ==
At the 2021 Census, there were 30,018 people in Keysborough.

=== Country of birth ===
43.2% of people were born in Australia. The next most common countries of birth were Vietnam (8.6%), Cambodia (8.5%), India (6.6%), China 5.1% and Sri Lanka 3.8%.

=== Language used at home ===
35.1% of people spoke only English at home. Other top languages spoken at home included Vietnamese (11.5%), Khmer (9.7%), Mandarin (6.8%), Cantonese (3.8%) and Sinhalese (2.2%).

=== Religious affiliation ===
The most common responses for religion were no religion (25.3%), Catholic (21.3%), Buddhism (19.6%), Islam (7.2%) and Hinduism (4.9%).

=== Dwelling structure ===
Of occupied private dwellings in Keysborough, 89.5% were separate houses, 9.4% were semi-detached, row or terrace houses, townhouses etc., and 1.1% were flats or apartments.

=== Tenure type ===
31.8% of homes in the suburb were owned outright, 46.7% were owned with a mortgage, and 18.7% were rented.

== Education ==
Keysborough is home to several schools.

Primary schools include:

- Chandler Park Primary School (formerly Maralinga and Chandler Primary Schools until they merged in 2010)
- Keysborough Primary School (formerly Keysborough Park and Coomoora Primary Schools until merging in 2010)
- Resurrection School, Keysborough
- Keysborough Gardens Primary School (opened in 2020)

Secondary schools include:

- Keysborough Secondary College

Colleges include:

- Haileybury College
- Lighthouse Christian College
- Sirius College
- Mount Hira College

== Transport ==
Public transport in Keysborough is provided by buses operated by Ventura Bus Lines, under contract to Public Transport Victoria. A SmartBus service runs on Springvale Road.

Bus routes that go to or pass through Keysborough include:

No.	Route
709	Mordialloc – Noble Park station via Keysborough South
811-812	Dandenong – Brighton via Southland SC
812	Dandenong – Brighton via Parkmore Shopping Centre
813	Dandenong – Waverley Gardens SC
816	Keysborough South – Noble Park Station
824	Moorabbin – Keysborough via Clayton & Westall
979	Clayton Station – Dandenong Station via Keysborough
828	Hampton - Berwick Station via Southland SC & Dandenong

== Leisure ==
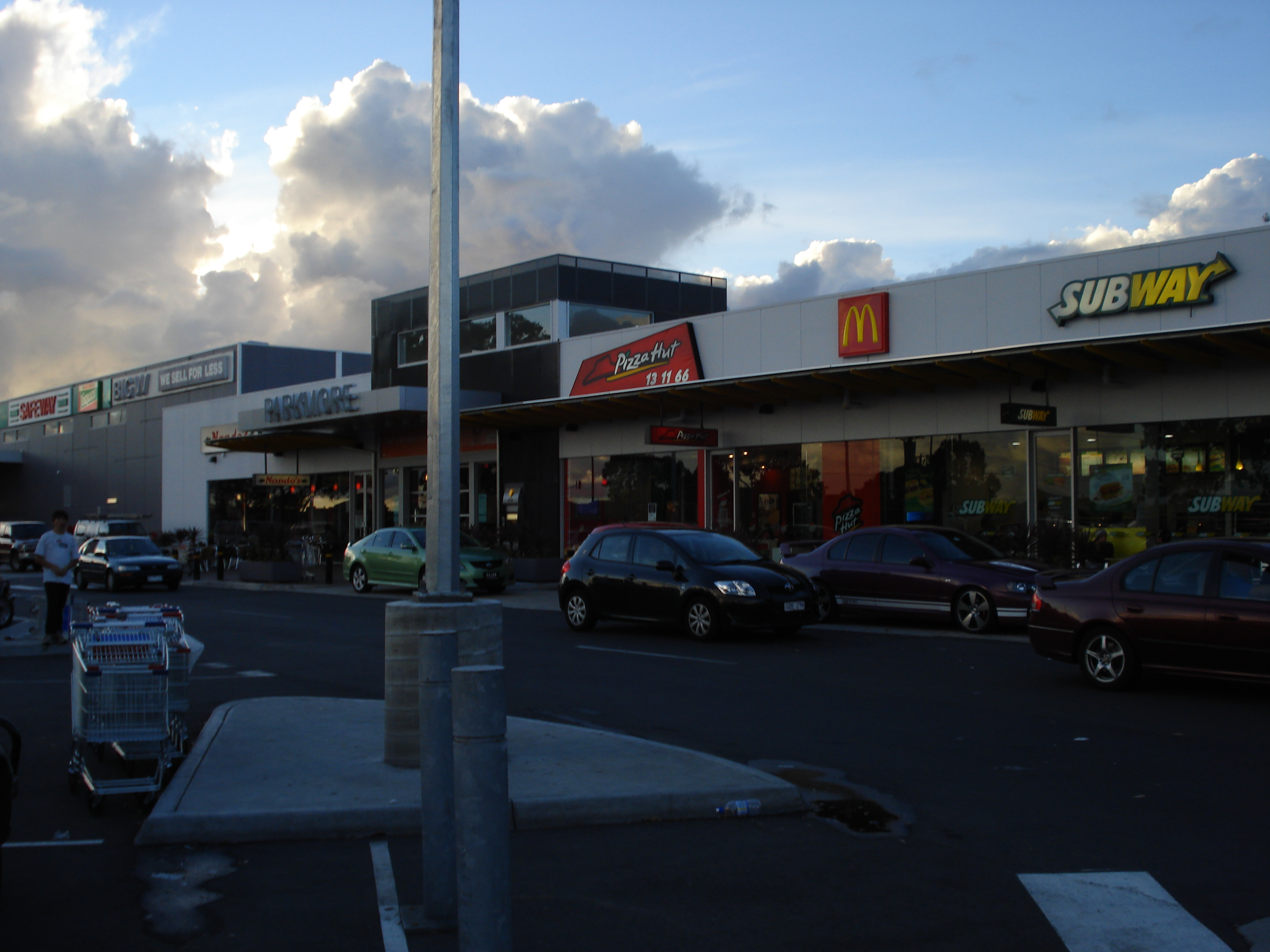
Parkmore Shopping Centre in Keysborough, 2008

There are several parks and shopping centres in the vicinity of Keysborough. The major shopping centre in Keysborough is Parkmore Shopping Centre, which is operated by GPT (General Property Trust).

=== Sport ===
Keysborough also has various sporting clubs:

- Tennis — The Keysborough Tennis Club offers courts for members and non-members
- Football and Netball — Keysborough Football & Netball Club offers Australian rules football and netball. It competes in the Southern Football Netball League. It is also the location of Gaelic Park, the former home of the Victorian GAA for Hurling and Gaelic Football
- Football (soccer) — Keysborough Soccer Club based at Coomoora Reserve competes in Division 4 of the Victorian State League
- Basketball — Keysborough is represented in basketball at the state level by the Keysborough Cougars. The Cougars have a number of junior sides and a team in the Big V.
- Golf — Golfers play at the course of the Keysborough Golf Club on Hutton Road, or at the course of the Southern Golf Club on Lower Dandenong Road in neighbouring Braeside.
- Dodgeball — Keysborough is also the home of the Victorian Dodgeball Association, whose annual event "Dodge Day Afternoon" is held at Springers Leisure Centre, just off Cheltenham Road, each October.
- Horse riding — Horse riding lessons and horse agistment (paddocks for hire) are available in Keysborough and the nearby suburb of Bangholme.

== See also ==
- City of Springvale – Keysborough was previously within this former local government area.
