= Him (Sarah Brightman song) =

Single by Sarah Brightman
- Released: 1983
- Recorded: 1983
- Genre: Classical Crossover
- Label: Polydor Records

Sarah Brightman singles chronology
"Not Having That!" (1981)	"Him" (1983)	"Rhythm of the Rain" (1983)

"Him" is a 1983 single by Sarah Brightman. It is a setting of lyrics by Richard Stilgoe to the tune "Repton" by Hubert Parry, itself best known from the hymn, Dear Lord and Father of Mankind.

It peaked at #55 in the UK charts.

== Track listing ==
1. "Him" (Hubert Parry, Richard Stilgoe)
2. "Memory" (Andrew Lloyd Webber, T. S. Eliot, Trevor Nunn)

== Charts ==
Chart (1983)	Peak position
UK Singles (OCC)	55
