= Braeside Park =

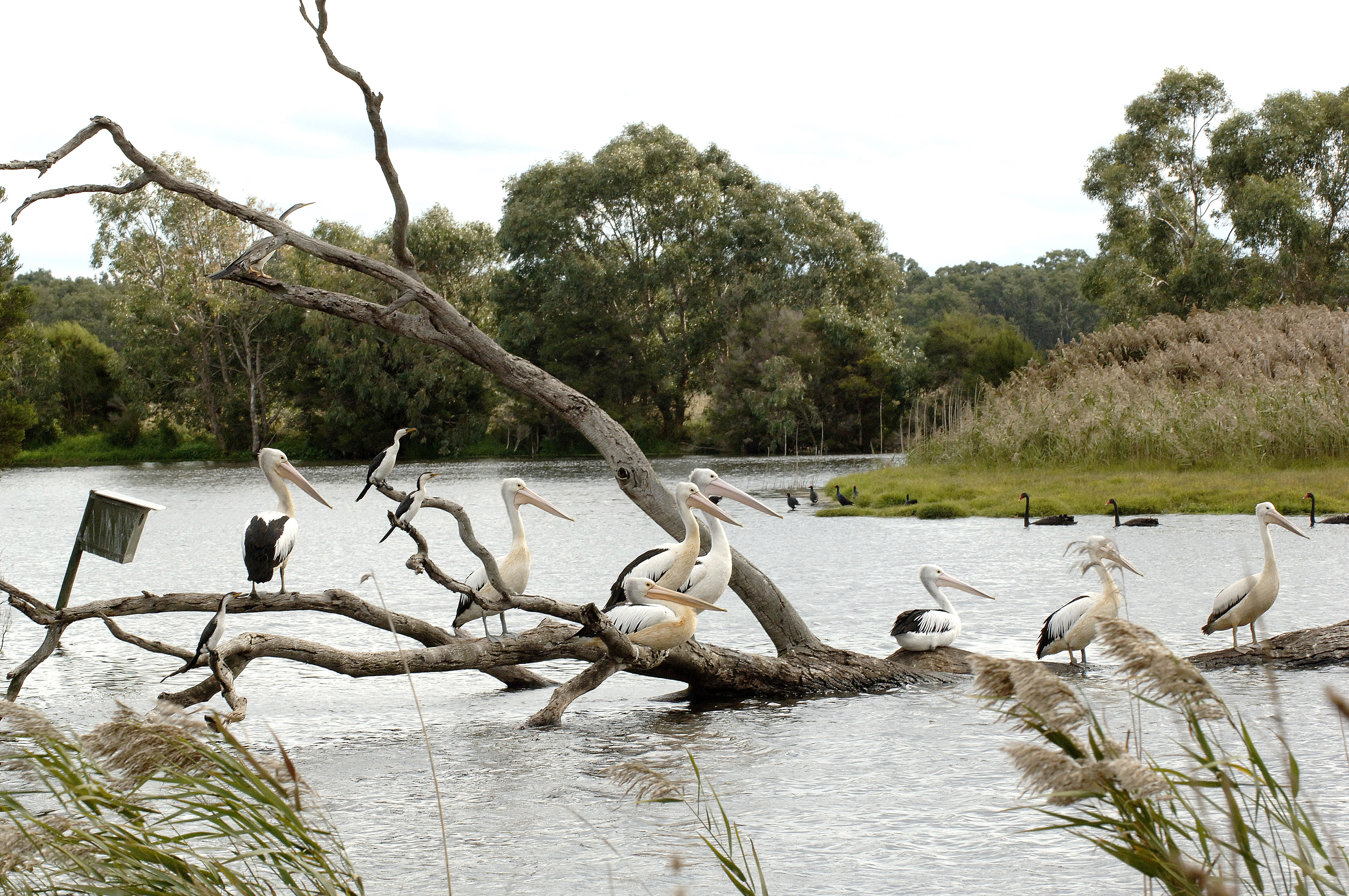
- Pelicans at Braeside Park
- Interactive map of Braeside Park
- Type: Metropolitan regional park
- Location: Braeside, Victoria, Australia
- Coordinates: 37.998°S 145.129°E
- Area: 310 hectares (770 acres)
- Manager: Parks Victoria
- Visitors: 460,000 (in 2017)
- Habitats: Wetlands; Heathlands; Red gum woodlands

Braeside Park is a 310-hectare (770-acre) metropolitan, recreational and conservation park in the south-eastern Melbourne suburb of Braeside.

== History ==
Before European settlement, the Bunurong people lived in and around the area for thousands of years. In 1851, the Colony of Victoria was established after separation from New South Wales; leases held by squatters were withdrawn and the land was surveyed, divided into portions and auctioned. The park since had a history of various owners and land uses. In 1982, Parks Victoria, assumed responsibility for Braeside park.

== Geography ==
The park's natural environment includes wetlands, heathlands and red gum woodlands.

The wetlands are made up of herbaceous native and introduced plant species which provide habitat for water-dependent birds. The heathland is located on sandy well-drained soil with vegetation including trees (mostly the manna gum), shrubs, sedges, grasses, groundcovers and herbs. The red gum woodlands consists of river red gums and a grassland of introduced grasses, mostly pasture grasses, due to the area's history of cattle grazing.

== Features ==
The park contains multi-use trails, a picnic area, tree stump art carvings and a community garden. Braeside Park has a 24-hour car park at the entrance to the park from Lower Dandenong Road.

The park's wetlands are also a popular birdwatching location. Birds such as the pacific black duck, pied cormorant, spotted pardalote and whistling kite can be found in the area. The park also fields the 45-hectare (110-acre) Heathland Conservation Zone, a restricted-access area aiming to preserve and enhance the remnant natural features and cultural resources of the heathland habitat.
