= Braeside, Victoria =

Braeside
- Suburb
- Interactive map of Braeside
- Coordinates: 38.000°S 145.125°E
- Country: Australia
- State: Victoria
- City: Melbourne
- LGA: City of Kingston
- Location: 25 km (16 mi) from Melbourne

Government
  - State electorate: Mordialloc
  - Federal division: Isaacs

Population
  - Total: 25 (2021 census)
- Postcode: 3195
Suburbs around Braeside
Mordialloc	Dingley Village	Keysborough
Mordialloc	Braeside	Keysborough
Aspendale Gardens	Aspendale Gardens	Waterways

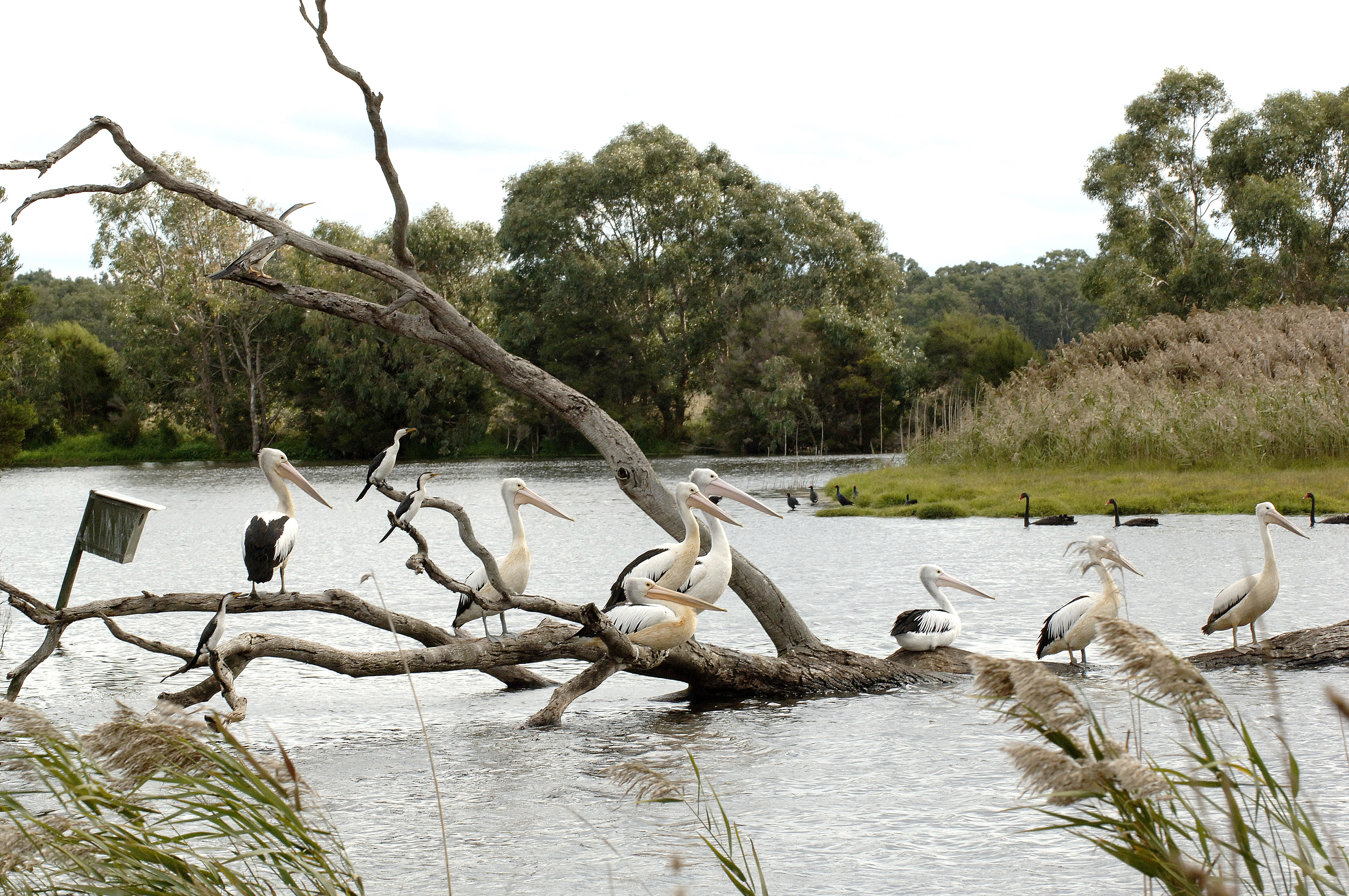
Pelicans at Braeside Park

Braeside is a suburb in Melbourne, Victoria, Australia, 25 km south-east of Melbourne's Central Business District, located within the City of Kingston local government area. Braeside recorded a population of 25 at the 2021 census.

Braeside is a largely industrial suburb with little residential areas.

== History ==
Braeside Post Office opened on 15 October 1915 and closed in 1972.

== Today ==
Braeside is a primarily industrial suburb bordered on its north by Lower Dandenong Road, on the east by Springvale Road, on the west by Boundary Road and to the south by Mordialloc Creek. On the south it is also bordered by Governor Road becoming Hutton Road towards Keysborough. Beyond these limits there is a new subdivision called Waterways.

Braeside is also known for Braeside Park, a reserve that opened in 1987. It was formerly farmland and owned by the Board of Works. Located on the east side of the proposed Peninsula Freeway, and taking up over half the suburb, Braeside Park has walking/bicycle trails including the Howard Road Trail, Red Gum Trail and the Bayside Trail.

There is also heathland and the Southern Golf Club.

The industrial sector of Braeside has been greatly developed in the past thirty years, with the preponderance of development taking place in the mid-1980s, by converting farmland into small or large factory units. Woodlands Industrial Estate is particularly notable in Braeside. Launched in 1992 and completed in 2003, tenants include Tyco, Wilson, the distribution centre of Kmart, Toro and Gale Pacific. This industrial estate took its name from the gum trees and open area, including the environmental wetlands area close by.

A campus of the Mentone Grammar School is in Braeside, including the Sports Centre with facilities to play soccer, cricket, tennis, field hockey, Australian rules football, and a rifle range. Close to the Sports Centre is the Pot of Colour Garden Nursery, Freccia Azzurra Club for the Italian community of Braeside, and the Croatian-Australian Church and Community Centre. Prominent commercial enterprises on the west of Springvale Road include Gardenworld and J.V. Marine World. The Church of Jesus Christ of Latter-day Saints is there as well.

== See also ==
- City of Springvale – Braeside was previously within this former local government area.
