= Patterson Lakes =

- Suburb
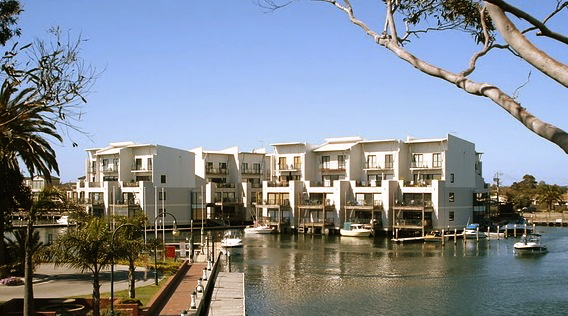
- Middle Harbour, Patterson Lakes Marina

- Interactive map of Patterson Lakes
- Coordinates: 38.076°S 145.122°E
- Country: Australia
- State: Victoria
- City: Melbourne
- LGA: City of Kingston
- Location: 35 km (22 mi) from Melbourne; 9 km (5.6 mi) from Frankston
- Established: 1978

Government
  - State electorate: Carrum
  - Federal division: Dunkley

Area
  - Total: 4.2 km^{2} (1.6 sq mi)
- Elevation: 4 m (13 ft)

Population
  - Total: 7,793 (2021 census)
  - Density: 1,855/km^{2} (4,810/sq mi)
- Time zone: UTC+10 (AEST)
- Postcode: 3197
- Mean max temp: 18.6 °C (65.5 °F)
- Mean min temp: 11.6 °C (52.9 °F)
- Annual rainfall: 525 mm (20.7 in)
Suburbs around Patterson Lakes
Bonbeach	Chelsea Heights	Bangholme
Carrum	Patterson Lakes	Sandhurst
Seaford	Seaford	Carrum Downs

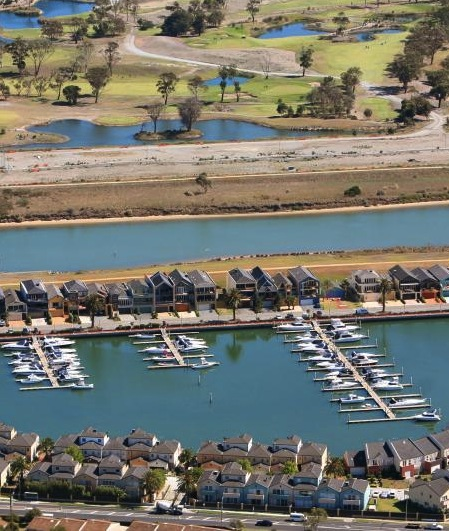
Aerial view of Patterson Lakes

Patterson Lakes is a suburb in Melbourne, Victoria, Australia, 35 km (22 mi) southeast of Melbourne's Central Business District, located within the City of Kingston local government area. Patterson Lakes recorded a population of 7,793 at the 2021 census.

Patterson Lakes is mostly a canal community built around the lower section of the Patterson River just 1–3 km (0.62–1.86 mi) upstream of the river mouth into the Beaumaris Bay. The suburb consists predominantly of new housing developments built around a series of tidal canals and artificial lakes, which is home to popular boat launching facilities along the Patterson River. The Patterson River and its tidal canals are popular boating portals into Port Phillip Bay. It includes four public boat ramps adjoining the Tidal Canal system to Port Phillip Bay; and includes the Patterson Lakes Marina and its facilities in Middle Harbour and Inner Harbour.

== History ==
=== Early history ===
After the melting of the last ice age, sea levels were 1–2 metres higher than today. When sea levels subsided to their current levels, fresh water from the Dandenong Ranges flowed into low-lying regions. Carrum Carrum Swamp, an extensive coastal wetland, was created, encompassing an area some 5,000 hectares from present-day Mordialloc to Frankston and inland towards Dandenong.

Prior to European discovery, the Patterson Lakes area was populated by Indigenous Australians known as the Kulin people. Inhabitants in the area were from the Bunurong language group, of the Mayone-Bulluk clan. Both the Mayone-Bulluk and Ngaruk-Willam clans would meet in the area of Dandenong often to hold ceremonies and trade. These gatherings were often attended by guests from other Bunurong clans or from neighbouring tribes, such as the Wathaurung and the Wurundjeri clans from the Woiwurong. As with most indigenous people of the world, Mayone-Bulluk cultural, ceremonial and spiritual life was dictated by the seasonal availability of natural resources. Through thousands of years of observation Bunurong People were able to predict the availability of their seasonal resources by certain changes in plant growth and animal behaviour.

Europeans first set foot in nearby Frankston as early as 1803, thirty-two years before the founding of Melbourne (the first major European settlement in the then Port Phillip District). A commemorative plaque near the mouth of Kananook Creek marks the location of where Charles Grimes and his party went ashore searching for fresh water, and met with approximately 30 local inhabitants.

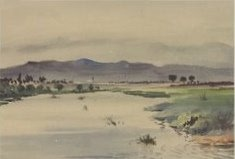
Watercolour painting by Robert J Hadden in 1895 of Carrum Creek (Patterson River)

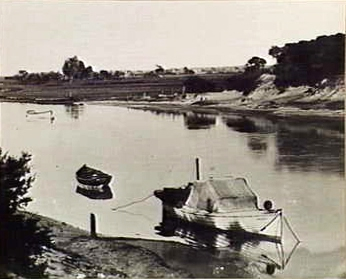
Photograph taken in 1905 of Carrum Creek (Patterson River)

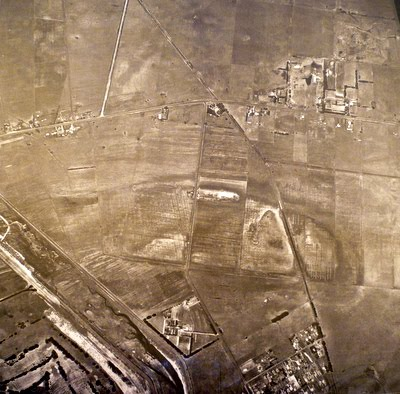
1960 before the Patterson Lakes development

=== The foundation of Patterson Lakes ===
Early development was hampered by poor soils, distance from the Melbourne city centre, and the existence of a major swamp occupying much of the area between Mordialloc and Seaford.

In 1866 the Carrum Carrum Swamp was surveyed and the land between Mordialloc Creek and Keast Park in Seaford was divided into 18 allotments and sold by auction for around three pounds per acre. In 1871 the government opened it for selection. The swamp was an impediment to the settlers and there was much discussion on how to reclaim the land, the first contracts for drainage works commenced in 1873. Attempts to reclaim the lower swamplands were ineffective. In 1876 it was decided to cut a 10-metre wide channel to Port Phillip Bay. It was to be known as 'Patterson Cut' and had been named after a State Parliamentarian and commissioner for public works - Sir James Brown Patterson. In 1876 the area that is now occupied by Patterson Lakes was owned by Kate and Henry Woodward, (HRW Woodward and Sons) who used the area for holding pastures for livestock. In the early 1970s some 200 acres of this area was subdivided by the Woodward family into Melbourne's first subdivision around artificial lakes. Other occupants of the area were the Priestly family who had landholdings either side of the Patterson River and ran a marina just east of what is now Pier One Drive. The Fitzgerald family ran a horse riding centre on the north-east corner of Thompsons Road and Old Wells Road on land that is now owned by Melbourne Water. The Walker family also owned some of the southernmost land bordering Eel Race Creek at one stage.

The suburb of Patterson Lakes was to be located in Carrum on what was originally part of the Carrum Carrum Swamp. The Carrum Carrum Swamp was drained in 1879 when the Patterson Cut, and other drainage measures were undertaken to prevent flooding of the Eumemmering Creek, which overflowed into the Carrum Carrum Swamp. The mouth of the Patterson Cut was mostly only open during the winter months, so heavy spring and summer rains often caused flooding to properties on the edge of the swamp area. Flood damage as far north as Edithvale often occurred. The only remnants of the Carrum Carrum Swamp now form the Edithvale–Seaford Wetlands (a Ramsar Wetland of International Importance.)

=== The Carrum Cowboys ===
The Carrum Cowboys were a group of teenagers, who rode their horses around Carrum and the surrounding areas in the late 1950s and 1960s. The name was a tag given to the group by the local police. The Cowboys rode on footpaths and were often riding too fast at the beach, which would lead to a number of complaints from local residents. On several occasions members of the Cowboys were pursued by police, which led to court action and fines being imposed. The over 50s AFL team for Patterson Lakes and Carrum is called the Carrum Cowboys.

=== The development of Patterson Lakes ===
The decision to go ahead with what was originally going to be called Gladesville took place in 1973. The development of residential areas adjacent to canals and waterways had been carried out successfully in many places. No-one had attempted to do this in Victoria unlike in other states. When Len Woodward looked closely at the land adjoining the Patterson River, he saw the possibility of a development. If it proved to be feasible and practicable, it would give home owners access to Port Phillip from their "back door". A large part of the area to the east of Carrum had flooded in the 1930s and 1950s, but to the engineers investigating the land, the important issues were why this occurred and how it could be prevented from occurring again. A common misconception was that the area was all swamp and mud. Extensive drilling found that only a surface layer of peat-like material was unsuitable. Underneath this layer was fine dense sand. The engineers realised that once the unsuitable material was removed (and used to strengthen levee banks and create landscaped areas and reserves) they would then be able to excavate to form lakes and canals, and use the excavated sand in forming residential sites. By using this fine, dense, carefully compacted sand, all the proposed residential sites would be brought to a level above that required by the authorities. The first soil was turned in 1974 in the north-east corner of Patterson Lakes around Iluka Island (Lake Legana.) Originally the plans were to build high rise towers of up to 15 stories in height. Patterson Lakes was rezoned from rural to residential. Central sites were planned for a shopping centre and for a marina which would have a second access to the river via flood gates. Sites for housing and apartments overlooking the marina and the river were identified. Sites for a primary school and for community facilities were also incorporated into the overall plan. Also the project was "different", in that more than a hundred non-lake, residential sites were created to further the concept of a new community having a mix of socio-economic groups.

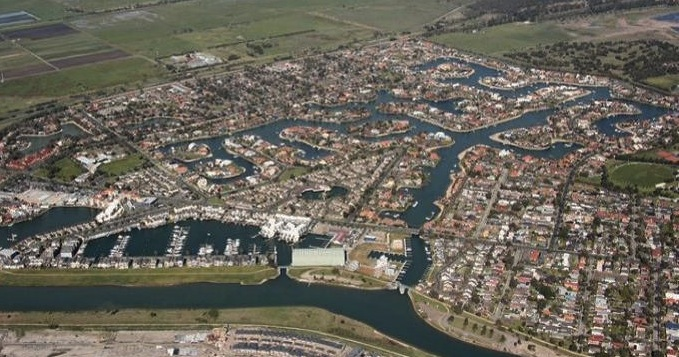
Patterson Lakes

=== Other history ===
1960s

- The Priestley family after gaining relevant approval were instrumental in establishing a dry dock marina. The first man made marina in the Southern Hemisphere was formed and the largest of its kind in Victoria. Having originally been named Whaler's Cove Marina the marina was later renamed Patterson Lakes Marina.
- In February 1966 the local coastguard branch was set up. The inaugural meeting of Flotilla 7 was held at a private residence in Chelsea on Tues 15 Feb 1966 at 8pm. From day one in 1966 until 2011, Bill Hills was a member of VF07, a remarkable achievement.

The executive was made up of:

- Commander: Reg Skinner
- Deputy Commander, Bill Hills
- Staff Officer, Bob White
- Training Officer, Alf Priestley
- In April 1966 the Patterson Lakes Canoe Club was founded, and in 2001 a new clubhouse was built at the Patterson River Launching Way.

1980s

- The Patterson Lakes Radio Model Yacht Club was founded in 1981.
- The Patterson Lakes Community Centre was founded in 1985.
- Patterson Lakes Post Office opened on 1 April 1986.
- The National Watersports Centre was founded in 1988.

1990s

- Carrum Rowing Club was founded in 1991.
- The National Watersports Centre Ski Club was founded in 1992.
- In 1999 the Dingley Pony Club moved to Patterson Lakes.

2000 - current

- In January 2004 the Patterson Lakes Outrigger Club was founded at the Patterson River Launching Way.
- The Patterson Lakes Library was founded in late 2009.
- The Gladesville Shopping Centre was founded in late 2011.
- The Carrum and Patterson Lakes Forum was formed in 2010 and the now disbanded, Residents Association of Patterson Lakes was formed in 2012 after Melbourne Water made changes to the precept rates.
- An international standard sculpture trail along the banks of Patterson River commenced in 2024 and will feature further artwork celebrating the boating lifestyle.

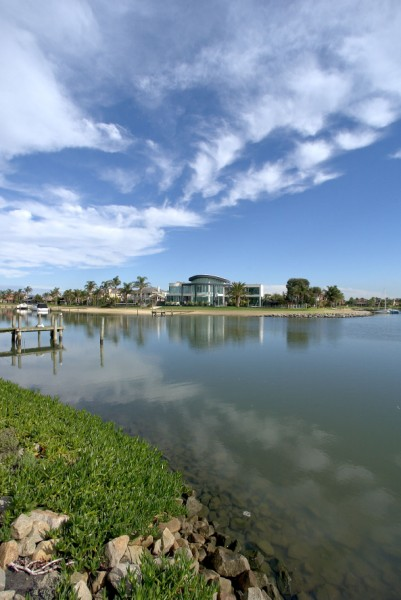
Tidal Canal, Patterson Lakes

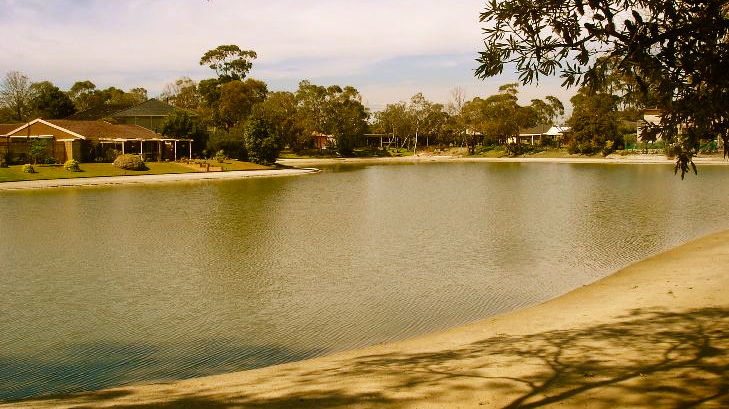
Lake Illawong, Quiet Lakes, Patterson Lakes

== Facilities ==
Patterson Lakes is serviced by the following shopping complexes: Lakeview Shopping Centre, Harbour Plaza Shopping Town & Medical Centre, Gladesville Shopping Centre and The Glade.

=== Sports and hobby facilities ===
- Patterson Lakes Basketball Club
- Patterson Lakes Outrigger Club
- Patterson Lakes Swim School
- Dingley Pony Club
- Dragons Abreast Patterson Lakes Pink Lotus
- Carrum Patterson Lakes Junior Football Club
- Long Beach Tennis Club
- Patterson Lakes Tennis Club
- Carrum Cricket Club
- Patterson Lakes Canoe Club
- Carrum Rowing Club
- Carrum Sailing Club
- Victorian Drag Boat Club Paterson Lakes Club
- National Water Sports Centre Ski Club
- Patterson Lakes Radio Model Yacht Club
- Patterson River Motor Boat Club

=== Other facilities ===
- Patterson Lakes Marina
- Patterson River Launching Way
- Patterson Lakes Library
- Patterson Lakes Community Centre
- National Watersports Centre - developed as an international standard rowing facility in preparation for Melbourne's bid for the 1996 Olympic Games.
- Numerous retirement villages
- Numerous cafes and restaurants

== Education ==
Patterson Lakes is serviced by a government primary school, the Patterson Lakes Primary School, which operates within Patterson Lakes; and a government secondary school, the Patterson River Secondary College, which operates from Seaford on the southern boundary of Patterson Lakes.

The closest private secondary school to Patterson Lakes is the Cornish College in Bangholme and Haileybury in Keysborough.

== Transport ==
Patterson Lakes is serviced by the Carrum railway station, located in Carrum, approximately 2 km (1.2 mi) to the west of Patterson Lakes, on the Frankston Line operated by Metro Trains Melbourne. Access to the area by road is from the Nepean Highway, EastLink, Mornington Peninsula Freeway and Peninsula Link. Patterson Lakes has freeways at its door-step with a travel time to the CBD of 30–35 minutes.

Patterson Lakes is accessible by a number of PTV bus routes servicing the area, which includes the 857 and 708.

== Fame ==
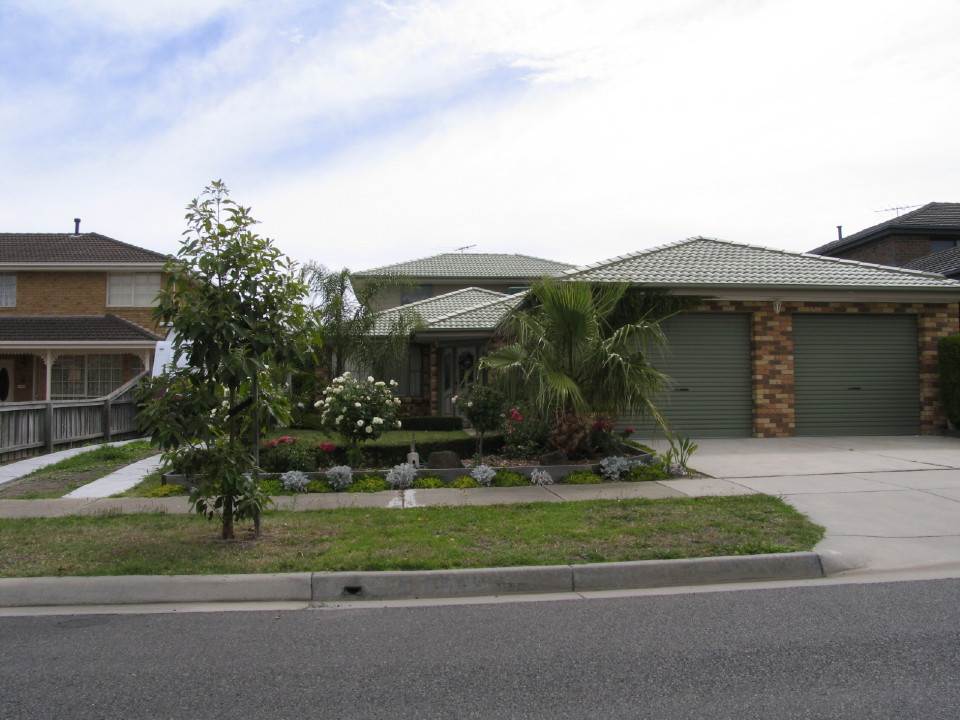
The Day-Knight townhouse in Lagoon Place, Patterson Lakes (taken outside of filming)

The filming at Kath Day-Knight and Kel Knight's "townhouse" (in the fictional suburb of Fountain Lakes), in the Australian comedy television series Kath & Kim, is shot in Patterson Lakes in Lagoon Place. Kath & Kimderella was also filmed at the same location as the original Day-Knight house of the TV series.

Former Prime Minister of Australia John Howard has visited Patterson Lakes Primary School to speak on their radio station, as have Bert Newton, and the hosts of former radio show Get This, Tony Martin and Ed Kavalee. Patterson Lakes was previously the home to NBA player Andrew Bogut and his family, who used to own two homes in Coral Island Court on the Tidal Canal.

== Politics ==
Chris Howe has been the councillor for Banksia Ward on the City of Kingston since 2024.

Patterson Lakes is in the District of Carrum in Victoria's Legislative Assembly, represented since 2014 by Labor MP Sonya Kilkenny.

Patterson Lakes is currently in the federal division of Dunkley, represented in federal parliament by Labor MP Jodie Belyea.

== Environment ==
=== Regions ===
Lake Carramar, Lake Illawong and Lake Legana, collectively known as the Quiet Lakes are three interconnected (via pumps and underground culverts) lakes in the suburb's northeastern neighbourhoods. The canal system that runs through most of Patterson Lakes is known as the Tidal Canal. Landmarks inside the Tidal Canal region include Clipper Island, Mariners Island, Staten Island, Rhode Island, Barellen Harbours and Schooner Bay.

Other landmarks of Patterson Lakes include Wannarkladdin Wetlands, Patterson River and Eel Race Drain (later becomes the Kananook Creek.) The Patterson Lakes Marina has facilities at the Town Centre (Inner Harbour), Runaway Bay (Middle Harbour) and Whaler's Cove (Western Harbour). The Patterson River is managed by Parks Victoria, while the Tidal Canal system and the Quiet Lakes are managed by Melbourne Water.

=== Climate ===
Patterson Lakes has a temperate climate similar to that of Melbourne, however it is usually 2°C cooler than the Melbourne CBD. In many cases, Patterson Lakes is one of the first suburbs of the Greater Melbourne area to feel the effect of the cool weather change that occurs during the summer season.

=== Walking & cycling trails ===
- Dandenong Creek Trail
- Bay Trail
- Peninsula Link Trail

=== Parks ===
- Roy Dore Reserve
- Adelong Court Reserve
- Arrunga Court Reserve
- Gladesville Boulevard Reserve
- Kalang Court Reserve
- Legana Court Reserve
- William Salthouse Park (named after the William Salthouse Ship that sank in Port Phillip Bay)
- John Lindsay Reserve (named after a paralympian called John Lindsay in 1996)
- Patterson River (managed by Parks Victoria)

=== Flora ===
Indigenous floral species include the silver wattle, samphire, lightwood, blackwood, black she-oak, river red gum, spike wattle, hedge wattle, scrub she-oak, jagged fireweed, silver top wallaby grass, Australian salt grass and the blue tussock grass. Non-indigenous floral species include the sheep's burr, angled onion, lesser joyweed, broom spurge, common swamp wallaby grass, pointed centrolepis, common spikerush and small spikerush.

=== Fauna ===
Reptile species found in Patterson Lakes include the Bougainville's skink, grass skink, tree dragon, copperhead snake and tiger snake.

The Patterson River and canals abound with fish. Aquatic species include the striped marsh frog, water rat, platypus, bream, flathead, tupong, Australian salmon, leatherjacket, yelloweye mullet, silver trevally, black crab, spider crab, eel, bass yabbies, mussels and pippies. Considered that there have been several reports of illegal fishing over the last few years, the fish always seem to fight back in this popular waterway. A number of charter companies operate from Patterson River. Bream and a few other varieties of estuary fish can be sourced from the Tidal Canal and Patterson River systems.

Bird species include the nankeen (rufous) night heron, white-faced heron, chestnut teal, straw-necked ibis, pacific black duck, pacific gull, silver gull, magpie-lark, Australian pelican, little pied cormorant, royal spoonbill, masked lapwing, whiskered (marsh) tern and the caspian tern.

== See also ==
- City of Springvale – Patterson Lakes was previously within this former local government area.
- City of Kingston – Patterson Lakes is located within this local government area.
- Patterson Lakes Marina
- Patterson River
- Dandenong Creek Trail
- Kath & Kim
- Electoral district of Carrum
- Bay Trail
