= Edithvale–Seaford Wetlands =

Wetlands in Victoria, Australia

Coordinates: 38°04′S 145°07′E

Designations

Ramsar Wetland
- Official name: Edithvale–Seaford Wetlands
- Designated: 29 August 2001
- Reference no.: 1096

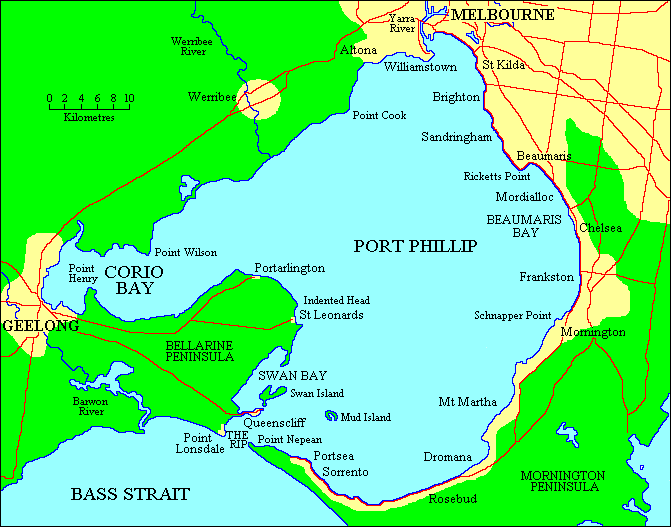
The Edithvale-Seaford Wetlands lie on the eastern side of Port Phillip Bay, between Chelsea and Frankston

The Edithvale–Seaford Wetlands is a collection of principally freshwater swamps and marshlands totalling 261 hectares (640 acres) in southeastern Melbourne, Australia, about 30 km (19 mi) southeast of Melbourne CBD. It is the largest natural wetland of its type in the Port Phillip and Western Port basins, and is all that remains of the historic Carrum Carrum Swamp, which once covered more than 4,000 hectares (9,900 acres) from present-day Mordialloc in the north to Frankston in the south.

The surviving wetlands are divided into two main groups, namely the northern Edithvale Wetlands (103 hectares or 250 acres in total) between Aspendale Gardens and Chelsea Heights, and the southern Seaford Wetlands (158 hectares or 390 acres in total) in northern Seaford, which together form the Edithvale–Seaford Wetlands Ramsar Site. The suburbs of Chelsea Heights and Patterson Lakes, as well as Patterson River, Kananook Creek and the few remaining lakes, ponds and retarding basins of the Chelsea Bicentennial Park, are located between the two main wetlands. Along with the nearby Eastern Treatment Plant, they form the Carrum Wetlands Important Bird Area.

All the wetlands are no more than 2 km (1.2 mi) away from the shore of Beaumaris Bay, bounded by Governor Road in the north, the coastal Nepean Highway in the west, the Mornington Peninsula Freeway and Frankston Freeway in the east, and Seaford Road in the south. Nowadays they are largely surrounded by residential areas, and some parts of the wetlands have been converted to parks, recreational reserves and golf courses.

== Description ==
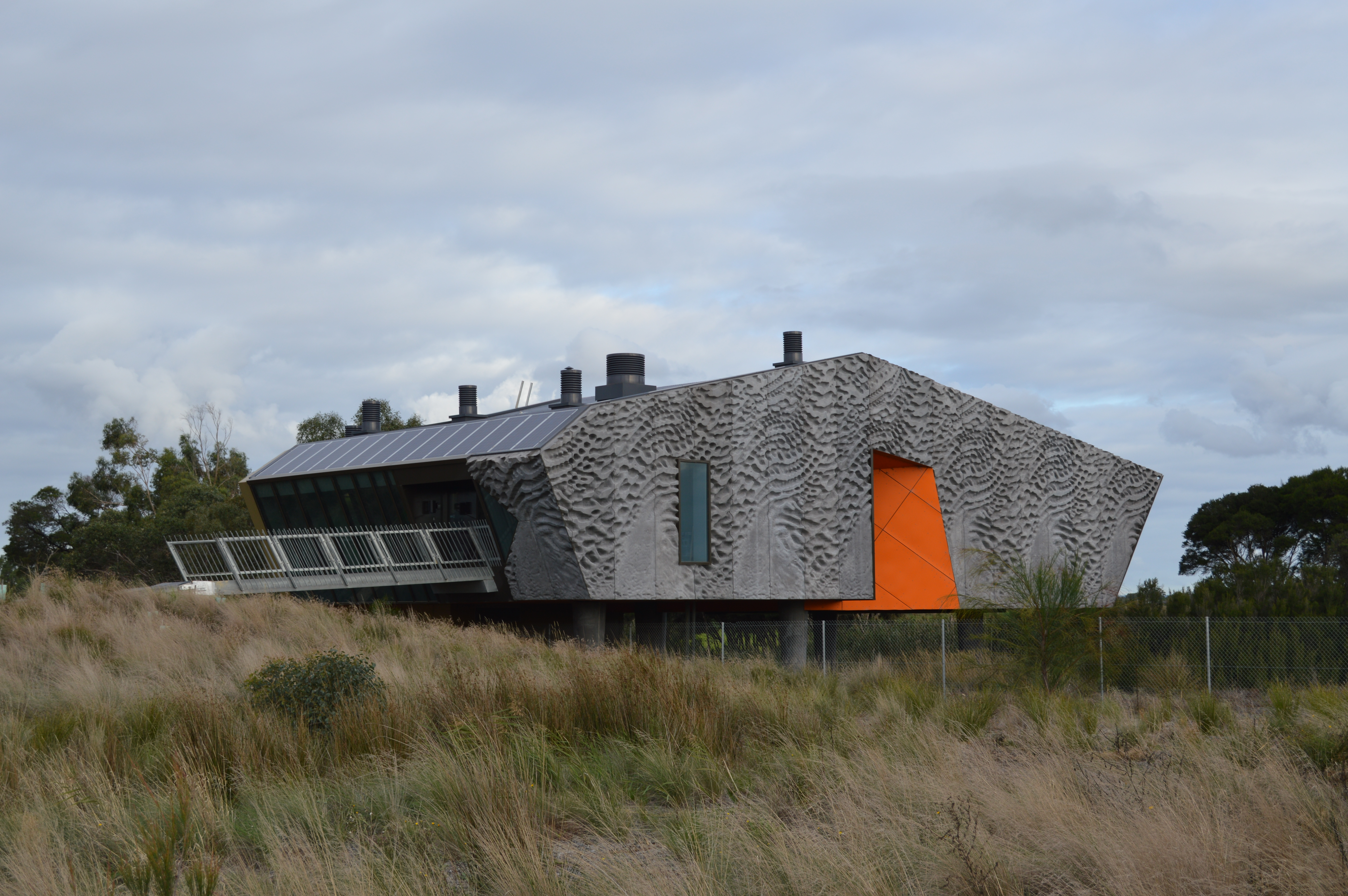
Edithvale-Seaford Wetlands Discovery Centre

The Edithvale–Seaford Wetlands is separated into its two groups by the Patterson River, the entire suburb of Patterson Lakes and the Kananook Creek. The Edithvale Wetlands group is much more elongated, lying along a drainage canal across the suburbs of Aspendale (northeastern corner), Aspendale Gardens, Edithvale (despite the namesake, only a trailside drainage ditch is within the suburb), Chelsea Heights, Bonbeach and northwestern Patterson Lakes. The Seaford Wetlands group is more tightly clustered, and is located across the suburbs of Seaford and Carrum Downs.

Both wetland groups are mainly freshwater wetlands underlain by peat beds that limit the entry of saline groundwater. They are seasonal floodplain systems deriving most of their water as runoff from their local catchments, the areas of which are no more than 500 ha (1,200 acres) each, and are essential components of the regional drainage system in receiving, retaining and naturally treating stormwater and other surface runoff, thus protecting surrounding areas from flooding as well as helping to protect the water quality of Port Phillip Bay. Hydrological management of the wetlands is aimed at enhancing their natural values and controlling the ingress of saline groundwater.

== History ==
Before European settlement of the Port Phillip area in the mid-19th century, the historic Carrum Carrum Swamp stretched from what is now Mordialloc in the north to Frankston in the south. The 4000 ha swamp's freshwater and brackish wetlands supported many animals and plants, including brolgas and magpie geese which are now locally extinct.

During the latter half of the 19th century the swamp was progressively drained for farming. In 1879 the Patterson River, an artificial waterway, was cut through the swamp to the coast as part of the drainage program. The remaining wetland areas were retained to provide critical flood protection.

=== Ramsar listing ===
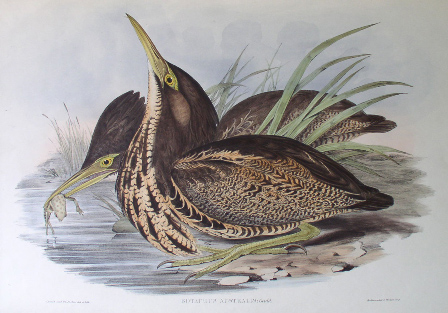
Australasian bittern

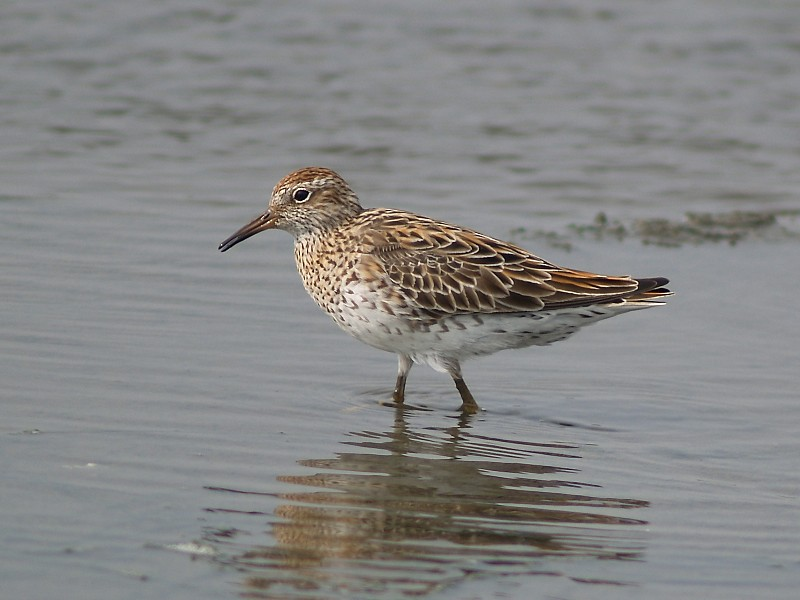
Sharp-tailed sandpiper

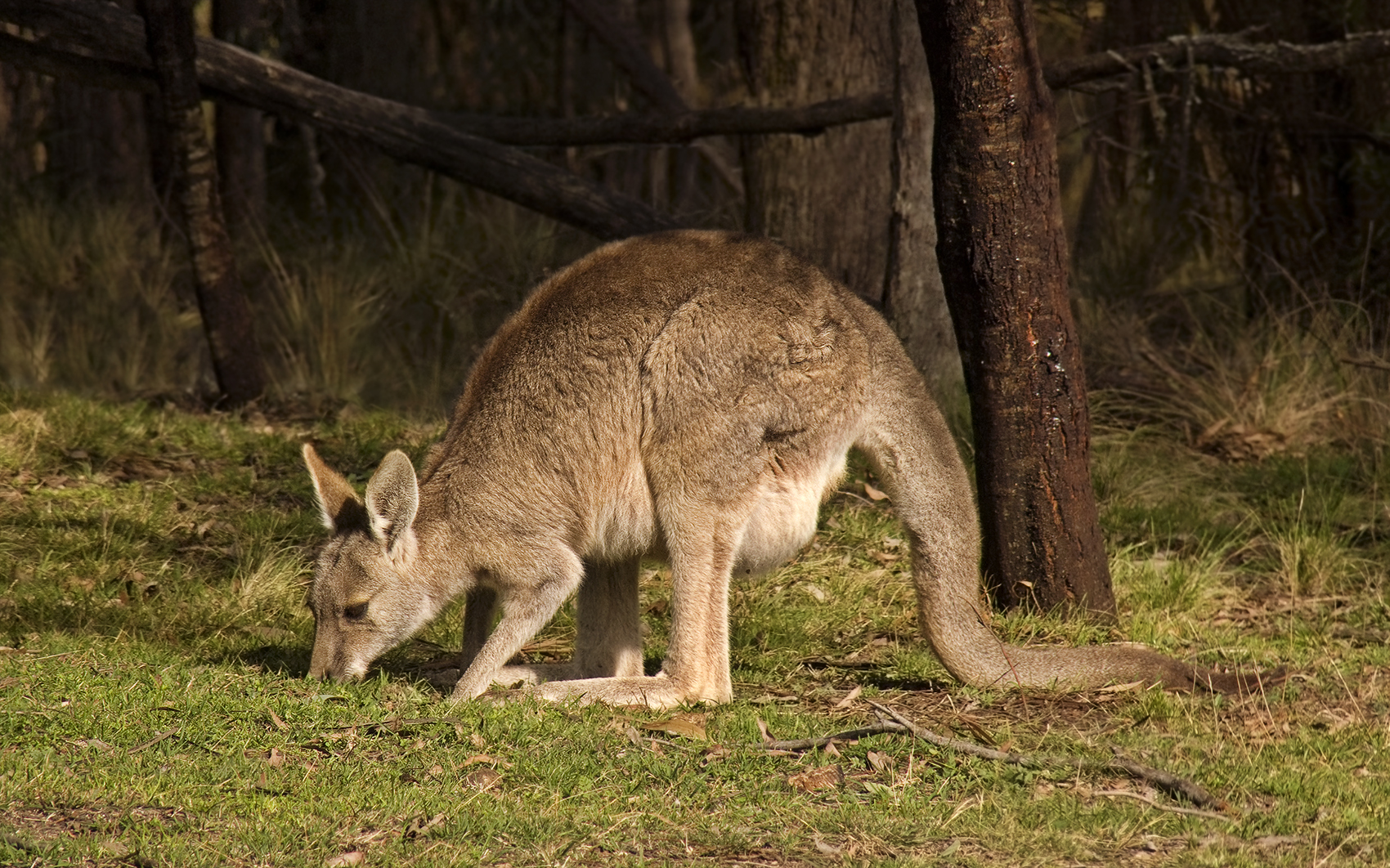
Eastern grey kangaroo

The wetlands were listed on 29 August 2001 under the Ramsar Convention, as Ramsar site 1096, Australia's 11th site, in recognition of their international importance, and specifically because they:

- are the last remaining examples of the Carrum Carrum Swamp, containing a variety of permanent and seasonal, freshwater and saline wetlands,
- support populations of the Australasian bittern, considered to be of state significance and threatened in Victoria, and
- support more than 1% of the East Asian – Australasian Flyway population of sharp-tailed sandpipers (or over 2000 birds) in up to one year in three.

They are also considered to be of exceptional significance as examples of cost-effective management of wetlands in an urban setting to provide conservation benefits, manage storm water, and encourage environmental education and research.

== Flora and fauna ==
=== Plants ===
The wetlands contain 14 ecological vegetation types. Three of state significance are plains sedgey wetland, tall marsh dominated by common reeds, and brackish aquatic herbland. There are several regionally significant populations of plant species, such as southern water-ribbons, only previously known in the state from western Victoria; as well as one of state significance – the large river buttercup. A dryland vegetation association present, though degraded by invasive weeds, is river red gum dune woodland, a community that has not been recorded elsewhere in Victoria and is of high conservation significance.

=== Animals ===
At any one time, up to 7000 individual birds make the Edithvale-Seaford Wetlands their home. Some 190 species have been recorded, including many migratory waders. Species listed as protected under Victoria's Flora and Fauna Guarantee Act 1988 are the great egret, Australasian bittern, Baillon's crake, Lewin's rail and the white-bellied sea eagle. There is also a population of eastern grey kangaroos.

== Access ==
The Edithvale Wetland is managed by Melbourne Water, while the Seaford Wetland is jointly managed by Melbourne Water and the City of Frankston. Public amenities include a bird hide (blind) at the Edithvale Wetland with education displays, as well as walking and bicycle tracks around both wetlands for birdwatching. The bird hide is accessible from Edithvale Road, staffed by volunteers from the Friends of Edithvale-Seaford Wetlands, and open from 1300 to 1700 on Sundays.

The hide was closed in early 2010 due to structural problems. It reopened in August 2016.
