= Patterson Lakes Marina =

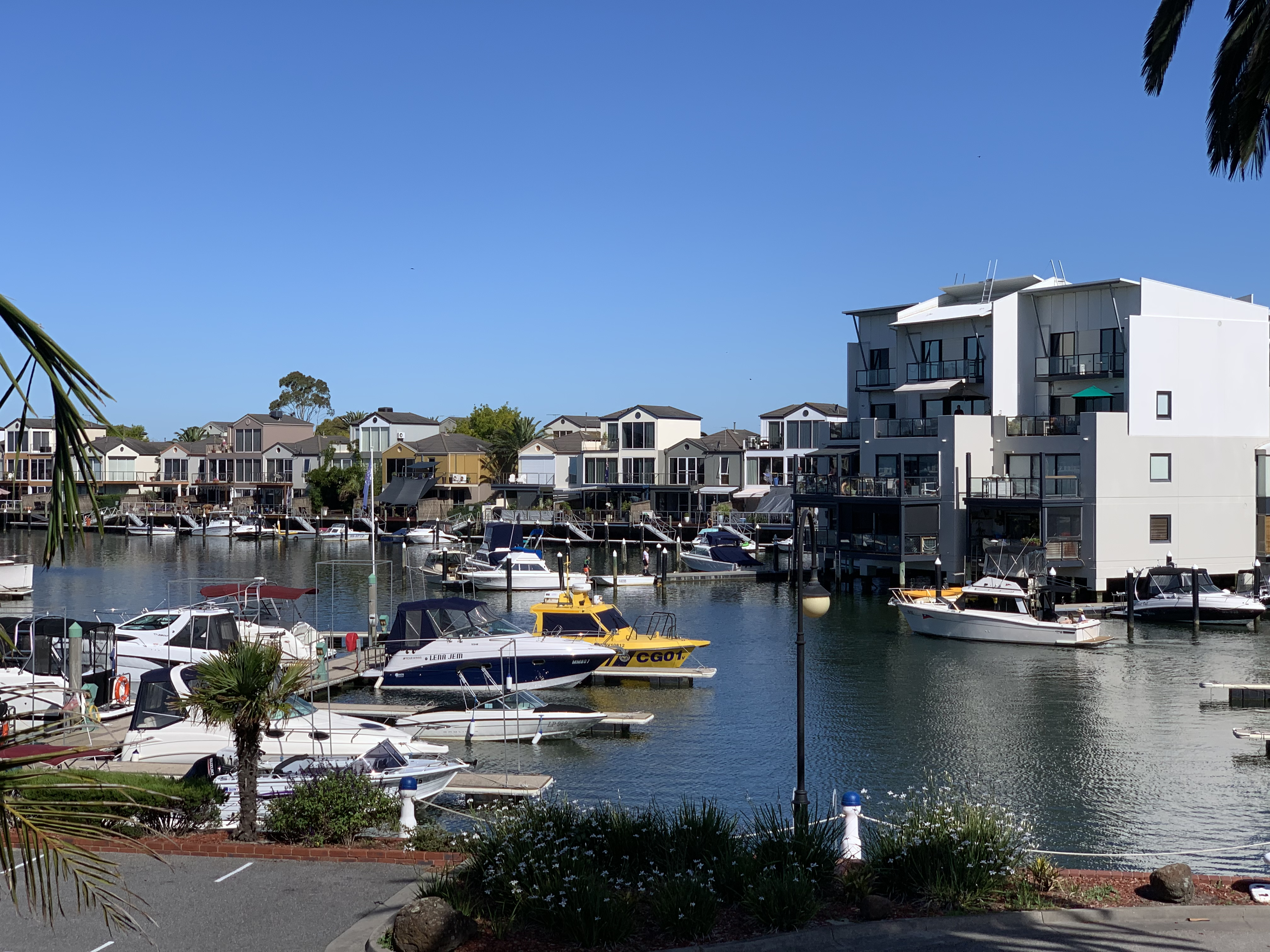
- Patterson Lakes Marina

Location
- Country: Australia
- Location: Victoria

Details
- City: Patterson Lakes, City of Kingston
- Max Boat Length, ft: 60 feet

Statistics
- Website pattersonlakesmarina.com.au

Patterson Lakes Marina is a marina in Patterson Lakes, a southeastern canal community suburb of Melbourne, Australia. Located along the south (left) bank of lower Patterson River, it is the largest marina in the state of Victoria. It is situated about 32 km (20 mi) from the Melbourne central business district, and just 1.25 km (0.78 mi) away from Port Phillip Bay.

Patterson Lakes Marina is known as a popular boating gateway to Port Phillip Bay and the bustling waterways around the Mornington Peninsula. Road traveling time is 35 minutes from Melbourne CBD via Nepean Highway, and 50 minutes to Portsea via the Mornington Peninsula Freeway. Patterson Lakes Marina performs such facilities as complete boat repair and fueling operations, entertainment facilities, and restaurants.

== History ==
Lang Lang pioneer Alfred Turner Priestley brought his family to Carrum for a holiday in 1913, and in 1918 he bought 170 acres (0.69 km^{2}) of pastoral land north and west of the Patterson River, operating a dairy farm from its northern side. In 1966 the Priestley family after gaining relevant approval were instrumental in establishing a dry dock marina. The first man made marina under 'chook sheds' in the Southern Hemisphere was formed, with Robert Jackson opening the Whaler's Cove Marina, following two cuts being made in the levee bank that was popular with businessman from Peter Brock to Phil Rudd. The Jackson family bought out Alfred Priestley, before expanding their operations, constructing a hard stack boat storage facility and developing the launch and retrieve facilities.

In 1988, the Jackson family sold out to Capital Resorts Group, retaining shareholdings that later went bust resulting in a new era of development after 1994 and the business being renamed to the Patterson Lakes Marina. Currently Patterson Lakes Marina is the largest marina in Victoria.

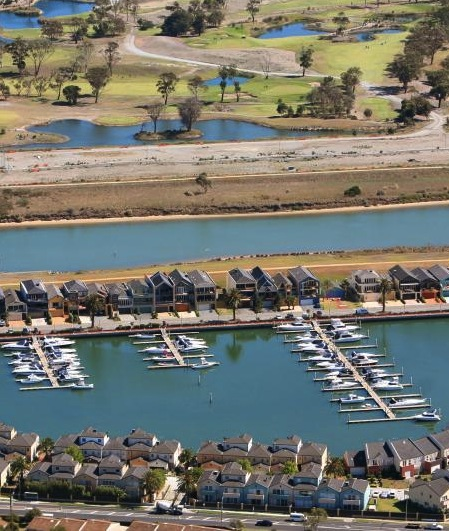
Aerial view of a section of Middle Harbour of Patterson Lakes Marina

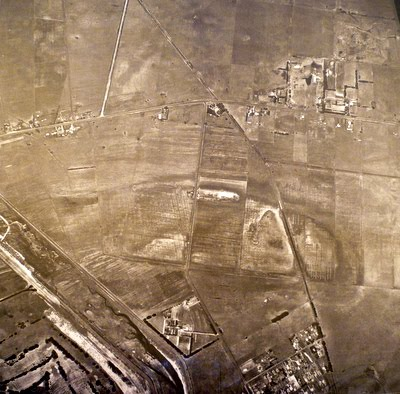
1960 before the Whaler's Cove Marina development

== Facilities ==
=== Hardstand ===
Patterson Lakes Marina has hardstand areas which accommodate boats up to 60 feet in length. The hardstand is serviced by a travel lift, with a lifting capacity of 25 tons. The travel lift pulls a vessel out of the water and moves it to a hardstand berth or to one of the factories, for boat maintenance and anti-fouling. The hardstand is situated near the new purpose built factories, which cover all facets of the marine service industry: mechanical services, complete boat maintenance, and other services.

=== Fuel ===
Premium Unleaded and Diesel fuel are available from the fuel dock in Patterson Lakes Marina. The dock is located on Inner Harbour Drive (enter through the 3rd floodgate).

=== Trailer Launching ===
Dual launching ramp with dock allows launch and retrieval of vessels. The ramp is frequently used 24 hours a day.

== Storage ==
=== Wet Berth ===
One of Patterson Lakes Marina services is secure all-weather wet berths for vessels up to 55 feet. All berths are serviced with water, 240-volt power and fire fighting equipment. Patterson Lakes Marina currently has 300 all-weather wet berths.

=== Dry Stack Storage ===
Lakes Marina provides dry stack storage. The dry stack storage building is solid concrete and fitted out with fire fighting and superior lighting equipment. The dry berths are located with repair facilities, parking the marina office. Dry berths are available for boats up to 30 feet in length and the crane can lift boats up to 4.5 tons. Current facilities make it possible to store 270 vessels in the dry-stack storage building.
