= Patterson River =

River in Victoria, Australia

Patterson Carrum Creek
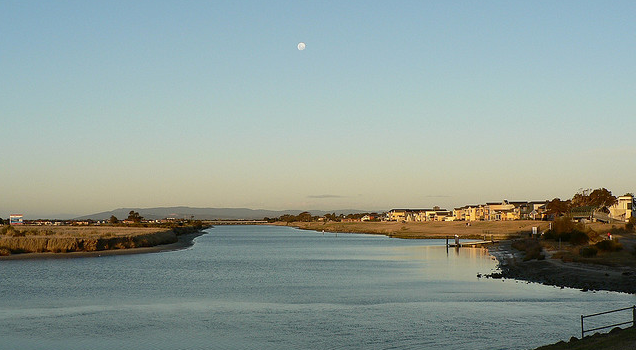
- Patterson River, near Patterson Lakes

- Location of the Patterson River mouth in Victoria
- Etymology: In honour of Sir James Patterson KCMG

Location
- Country: Australia
- State: Victoria
- Region: South East Coastal Plain (IBRA), Greater Melbourne
- Local government area: City of Kingston

Physical characteristics
- Source confluence: Dandenong Creek and Eumemmerring Creek
  - location: southwest of Bangholme
  - coordinates: 38°2′37″S 145°10′29″E
  - elevation: 6 m (20 ft)
- Mouth: Beaumaris Bay, Port Phillip
  - location: at Carrum
  - coordinates: 38°4′26″S 145°7′6″E
  - elevation: 0 m (0 ft)
- Length: 5 km (3.1 mi)

Basin features
- River system: Port Phillip catchment

The Patterson River is a partly man-made, tidal urban river of the Port Phillip catchment in the Australian east coast state of Victoria, located in the outer southeastern suburbs of the Greater Melbourne region. Under the name "Patterson", it is the shortest river in Victoria at only 6 km (3.7 mi) in length, although its main stem tributary and de facto upper section, the Dandenong Creek, is over 53 km (33 mi) long.

The river has only two sites of bridge crossings along its entire course, being traversed by the Mornington Peninsula Freeway (and the adjacent Wells Road) at its middle section at Patterson Lakes, and by the combined bridges of the Nepean Highway and the Frankston railway line at the junction of Bonbeach and Carrum less than 180 m (200 yd) above its mouth. There are no ferry services across the river, but the river is navigable to private boats (both human- and engine-powered) that can be deployed from various marinas, docks and ramps along the river.

== Location and features ==
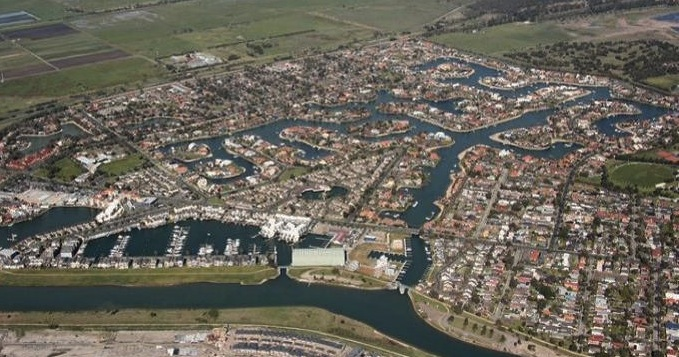
Patterson River (bottom) and the namesaked canal suburb of Patterson Lakes (above)

The man-made river was constructed in 1878 as the Patterson Cut to assist the drainage of coastal swamplands located in what is now the suburb of Carrum. The headwaters of its two main tributaries, Dandenong Creek and Eumemmerring Creek, both originate in the Dandenong Ranges, and the "Patterson"-named section only refers to the lower reach formed after the confluence of the two creeks southwest of Bangholme, approximately 35 kilometres (22 mi) southeast of Melbourne CBD. The river then flows generally southwest (picking up numerous minor drainage channels) and drops to a lower level at a weir and fishway underneath the Mornington Peninsula Freeway, before emptying into Beaumaris Bay, an eastern bight of Port Phillip Bay, just 2 km (1.2 mi) north of the Seaford Wetlands. The waterway descends merely 5.4 metres (18 ft) over its 5-kilometre (3.1 mi) course, and provides boat access to canals and marinas in the suburbs of Patterson Lakes, Carrum and Bonbeach.

As one of the few designated safe harbours on the city side of the bay, the Patterson River serves as a major boating gateway to Port Phillip Bay.The fully fledged canal system within the Patterson Lakes residential area, alongside the wet and dry storage facilities at the Patterson Lakes Marina and four public boat ramps,s create a heavily used waterway.

== History ==
In 1866, the Carrum Carrum Swamp was surveyed and the land between Mordialloc Creek and Keast Park in Seaford was divided into 18 allotments and sold by auction for around three pounds per acre. In 1871 the government opened it for selection. The swamp was an impediment to the settlers and there was much discussion on how to reclaim the land, the first contracts for drainage works commenced in 1873. Attempts to reclaim the lower swamplands were ineffective. In 1876 it was decided to cut a 10-metre (33 ft) wide channel to Port Phillip Bay through widening and deepening Carrum Creek. It was to be known as the "Patterson Cut" and was named after Sir James Patterson KCMG, at the time the Victorian Minister for Public Works; and later Premier.

The suburb of Patterson Lakes was to be located in Carrum on what was originally part of the Carrum Carrum Swamp. The Carrum Carrum Swamp was drained in 1879 when the Patterson Cut (formed in 1876), and other drainage measures were undertaken to prevent flooding of the Eumemmering Creek, which overflowed into the Carrum Carrum Swamp. When the Patterson Cut was dug the area that is now occupied by Patterson Lakes was turned to farmland with mainly dairy cattle. By the late 1960s farming activities had just about ceased, and the area was popular with fox and rabbit shooters.

In 1974 the first soil was turned in the preliminary stages of the development of Patterson Lakes, where sites for housing and apartments overlooking the marina and the river were identified. A canal system called the Tidal Canal and the Quiet Lakes were developed, where the Tidal Canal adjoined to the Patterson River.

== Ecology ==
Indigenous floral species along the Patterson River include the silver wattle, lightwood, blackwood, black she-oak, river red gum, spike wattle, hedge wattle, scrub she-oak, jagged fireweed, silvertop wallaby grass, Australian salt-grass and the blue tussock grass. Non-indigenous floral species include the sheep's burr, angled onion, lesser joyweed, broom spurge, common swamp wallaby grass, pointed centrolepis, common spikerush and small spikerush.

Terrestrial reptilian species of the Patterson River catchment include the pale-flecked sunskink, Bougainville's skink, southern grass skink, jacky dragon, lowland copperhead and tiger snake. Aquatic species include the eastern long-necked turtle, striped marsh frog, pobblebonk, water rat, platypus, black crab, spider crab, eel, bass yabbies, mussels and pippies. Bird species include the nankeen (rufous) night heron, white-faced heron, chestnut teal, straw-necked ibis, pacific black duck, pacific gull, silver gull, magpie-lark, Australian pelican, little pied cormorant, royal spoonbill, masked lapwing, whiskered (marsh) tern and caspian tern.

The Patterson River abounds with fish, typically with freshwater species above the Mornington Peninsula Freeway weirs and marine/brackish species below. Popular species sought by recreational anglers include Australian salmon, flathead, tupong, southern bream, leatherjacket, yellow-eye mullet, silver trevally and mulloway, and estuary perch and a few other varieties of migratory fish (e.g. freshwater eels) can be sourced from the Tidal Canal and Patterson River systems. There have been several reports of illegal fishing over the years, however the fish populations always seem to fight back in this popular waterway. A number of fishing charter companies operate from Patterson River.

== Facilities ==
Adjacent to the river, there are a number of recreational facilities, including:

- Undercover picnic areas and electric barbecues
- Bike trails to Mordialloc, Dandenong, Mount Eliza, Frankston and Melbourne
- Plentiful estuary fishing (bream, mullet) and well equipped tackle and bait
- Boardwalks and an indoor/outdoor cafe
- Coast Guard on duty weekends
- Charter vessels
- Public launching ramps at Launching Way, located off McLeod Road, Carrum, that provide water access for approximately 50,000 boats per annum.

== Gallery ==
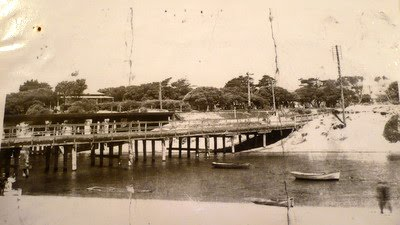
Photograph of Carrum Creek (Patterson River) in the early 1900s.

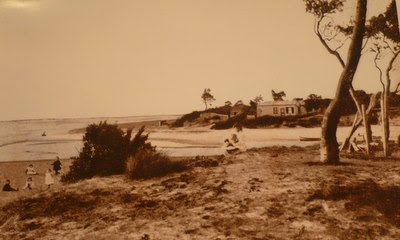
Photograph of Carrum Creek (Patterson River) in the early 1900s.

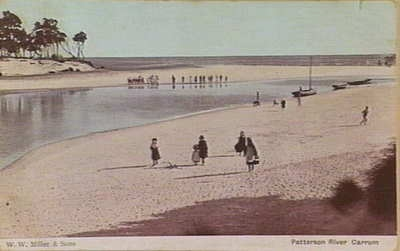
A postcard from 1908 of the mouth of Carrum Creek in Carrum.

== See also ==
- Patterson Lakes
- Patterson Lakes Marina
