= Patterson River Secondary College =

School in Melbourne, Australia

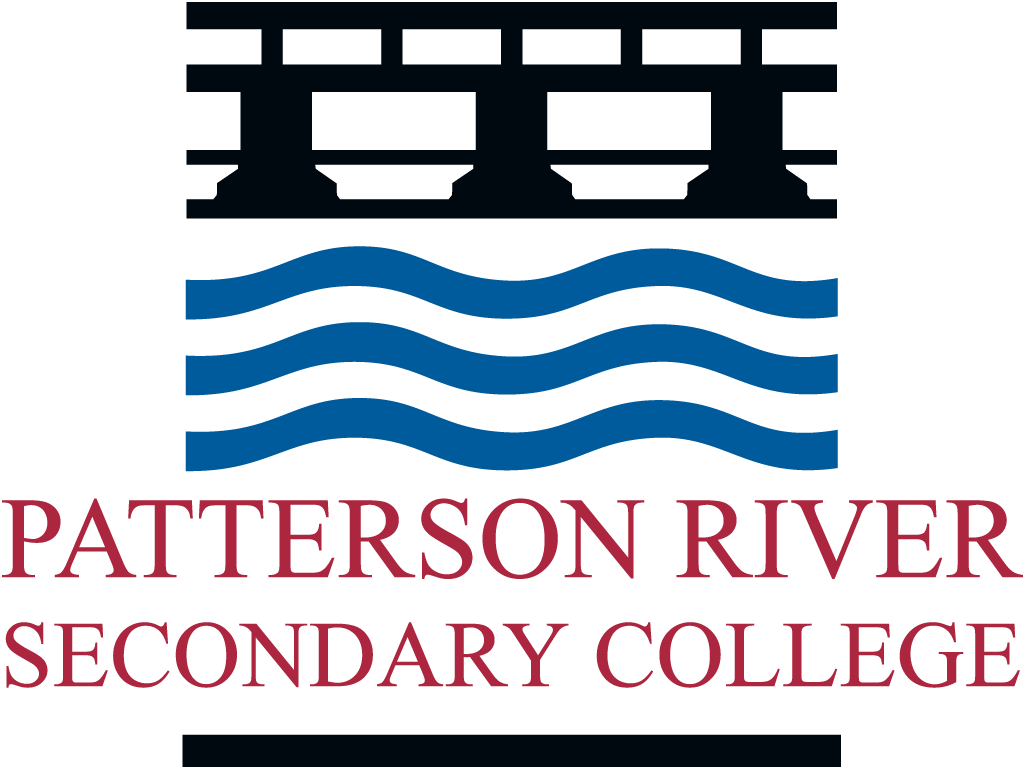

Location
- Eel Race Rd; Carrum, Victoria; Australia; 38°5′3″S 145°8′7″E

Information
- Type: Public, secondary, day school
- Motto: Achieving Excellence Together
- Established: 1968
- Principal: Daniel Dew
- Years: 7–12
- Gender: Co-educational
- Enrolment: 1,120
- Colours: Maroon, navy blue, white
- Website: www.prsc.vic.edu.au

Patterson River Secondary College is a public co-educational high school located in Seaford, Victoria, Australia. Formerly called the Seaford Carrum High School, in 1992 the school merged with the nearby Bonbeach High School, staying on the site of Seaford-Carrum. The school caters for approximately 1,340 students and has approximately 170 staff. The current principal is Daniel Dew, who was appointed in 2016. The three Assistant Principals are Samantha Jeacle (Curriculum Operations), Lisa Cavey (School Operations), and Jeremy Woods (Student Operations). Patterson River has a mean study score of 28 across all subjects as of 2018.

== History ==
The school was called Seaford-Carrum High at the time of opening. When it was first opened, it operated in the position the current Carrum Primary School is.

=== 2005 student-teacher incident ===
In mid-2005, a teacher at Patterson River, working in a portable at the back of the school, lacking a telephone, experienced harassment from a male student. After having been suspended, the harassment continued after his return to the school. The teacher, due to this, experienced several symptoms, including "feeling nauseous", "panic attacks", and stress, ultimately leading to her daughter (who was in Year 12 at the time) to drive her to school. Later on, a female student accused the teacher of having "kicked her", with it being withdrawn after time.

In September 2006, the teacher was awarded weekly compensation payments in a verdict from a Melbourne County Court judge, due to "overwhelming evidence" that the teacher had suffered psychological injury.

=== 2020 announcement of school upgrades ===
On 20 May 2020, the state government announced $7.2 million worth of upgrades. Facilities such as new economics, and science rooms will be a part of these additions. Work began in the second half of 2020.

=== 2021 fallen tree incident ===
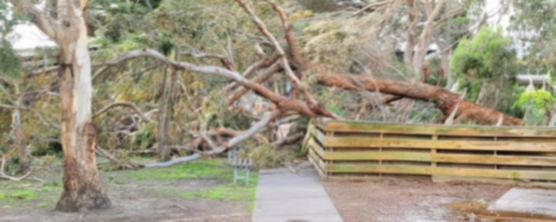
The tree which fell on the year 7 courtyard

On 8 June 2021, strong winds hit Melbourne, causing damage. At Patterson River, a large tree managed to get uprooted, falling onto the year 7 courtyard, preventing people from walking through it. The tree was log bucked, and left adjacent to the footpath.

== School partnerships ==
Patterson River has a partnership with Monash University as well as a sister school in Lorch, Germany, called Schaffersfeld Schule, where annual exchange programs are held with the German students of PRSC.

== Facilities ==
Patterson River Secondary College's facilities include:

- Library, which is open from 8:15 am to 4:00 pm. It has an extensive collection of media, such as newspapers, DVDs, books, and board games, most of which are accessible by students of the college. Additional features include laptops and desktops.
- Stadium, opened in 2011–12, houses three indoor basketball courts, which are used by the school and by local clubs for most sporting events. The stadium can hold all college students for a full school assembly on one court.
- Year 12 Common Room. In early 2017, the former Year 12 common-room and the surrounding classrooms underwent an overhaul, opening in September of the same year, as a new assembly area for senior students, so they prepare food, talk with teachers about classwork, and have a quiet place to undertake study when students do not have enrolled classes during their study/free periods.

Other facilities include the Year 7 and Year 9 Centres, which house most of the Year 7 and 9 classrooms under the one roof, the canteen which is open during recess and lunchtime, a football oval and soccer pitch for recess and lunchtime use by students, three food technology rooms, a music and performance hall, workshops for wood, metal, and electronic work, specialised rooms for Art, Science, Music, Drama, and IT, as well as more general classrooms.

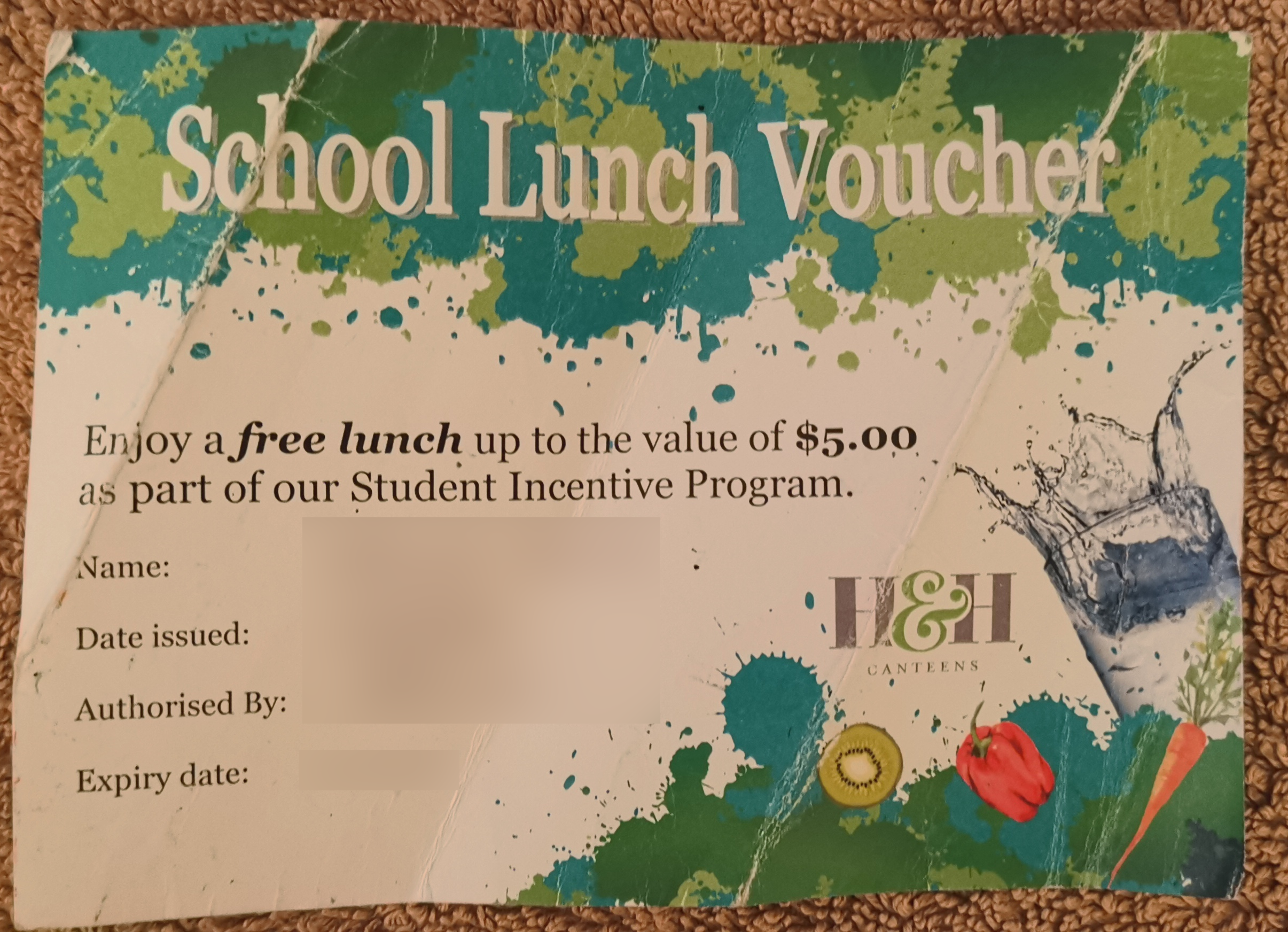
A lunch voucher given to students after Melbourne's first COVID-19 lockdown. It was awarded to students deemed most prolific throughout online learning.

Some of the rooms feature Mac/PC computers, science equipment, drama props and costumes, stages, musical instruments, woodworking or metalworking materials and tools, cooking benches and utensils, art materials, and laptops in some rooms for student use.

== Extra-curricular and extension ==
The school has many extra-curricular and extension programs and activities. They include music performance programs, such as:

- Junior school concert band
- Year 8 band
- Senior concert band
- Stage band
- Instrumental ensembles
- Choir

In September, the school hosts an annual Soiree, wherein all the music performance groups present the music they have been playing throughout the year. The school facilitates many opportunities for student leadership, such as leaders for Forms (Classes), Year Level Captains, House Captains, and College Captains. There are many other student leadership programs as well, such as Student Representative Council, Peer Support program, Production and Dance Leadership Committees, Sport Leaders, and Music Performance leaders. There is an "Excel" program at the school, aimed at motivated, high-achieving students to be in a class with similar minded peers, to encourage their academic development.

The school provides many services to its students onsite, including counselling, support groups, career counselling for Year 10s, clubs, and more. They also host many international student exchange programs with schools in Germany, China, and in Japan, which students are able to participate in as well, either through travelling to other schools, or through participating in, or assisting with, the hosting of exchange students.

The school has a regular Presentation Ball and an annual Senior School Ball held at either The Chelsea Town Hall or Mornington Racecourse, as well as Year 7 three-day camps on Phillip Island, and Year 9 orientation camps to the Grampians. Senior Students (Years 10–12) can also choose to participate in Outdoor Ed classes which enables them to participate in other camps and outdoor activities. There is a Year 9 Community Leadership program in which the school partners with the local fire brigade to receive fire-fighting training and complete a First Aid certificate through Life Saving Victoria, as well as work towards Bronze Life Saving through Bonbeach Lifesaving.

== Notable alumni ==
Cooper Smith (DJ)

Archer McHugh (Athlete)

Ned Capp (Artist)
