= William Salthouse (ship) =

Merchant ship

Coordinates: 38°16′28″S 144°42′13″E

History

United Kingdom
- Name: William Salthouse
- Route: Montreal, Canada to Melbourne Harbour
- Launched: 1824
- Out of service: 28 November 1841
- Fate: Hit reef near Point Nepean

General characteristics
- Type: Barque
- Tonnage: 251-ton
- Propulsion: Sail

William Salthouse was the first merchant vessel to sail with a cargo of merchandise from the British Dominion of Canada to British Colonies of Australia. The ship was lost on 28 November 1841 while attempting to enter Port Phillip Heads en route to Melbourne Harbor. The wreck of William Salthouse has been the site of several maritime archaeological investigations as well as experimental in situ conservation efforts.

== The Story of William Salthouse ==
William Salthouse was a 251-tonne barque designed and built for trade by Salthouse and Co. of Liverpool, a prominent merchant, in 1824. It served as a trading vessel delivering mixed cargoes from Britain to its colonies in the West Indies and India for 17 years before being sold to Green and Co. of Liverpool. Green and Co. were aware of the colony at Melbourne's struggle to establish itself as self-sustaining and recognized it as a potentially profitable investment for trade. The economical incentives are most likely what prompted William Salthouse's change of trade destination to Montreal and onto Port Phillip. On 27 March 1841 William Salthouse departed London en route to Montreal, where it arrived safely on 26 May 1841. After clearing Montreal customs on 17 June 1841, the vessel set sail on open water for Melbourne by mid-July loaded with mainly flour and salted provisions, but also carrying whiskey, wine, cider, vinegar, and nails.

It was a stormy day on 28 November 1841 when William Salthouse, guided by its Captain George Brown, attempted to fight the opposing tides and make port at Melbourne Harbor, just beyond Port Phillip Heads. According to records, the choppy surface of the water gave no indication of a reef located near Point Nepean where the vessel collided, dislodging the rudder and causing William Salthouse to take on water. Captain Brown ordered that an anchor be dropped to steady the unnavigable vessel while a brave unnamed pilot from nearby Queenscliff boarded the crippled ship in an attempt to help sail it through the Heads of Port Phillip Bay. Unfortunately, the vessel was too badly damaged and before long had foundered on Pope's Eye Shoals with two metres of water in its holds. It was at this time Captain Brown gave the order to abandon ship, it would be more than 140 years before William Salthouse would be seen again.

The William Salthouse is now the name of a park and a road (William Salthouse Way) in the suburb of Patterson Lakes.

== Legislation and Public Access ==
Divers Peter Kennedy and Dennis Bolton discovered William Salthouse wreck in August 1983, near Popes Eye Bank in Port Phillip Bay. It lies in 12 metres of water, buried in a 2 to 3 metre sand ridge, and is approximately 25 metres long by 8 metres wide. Material is scattered up to 50 metres from the hull remains. The site quickly became subject to disturbance by divers. Official inspection led to the declaration of the site under Historic Shipwrecks Act 1981 (Vic) on 22 December 1982. Unfortunately looting and interference continued, and on the 9 February 1983 a ‘Protected Zone’ was put in place around the wreck. This zone had a radius of 250 metres and could only be entered with a permit. The implementation of a permitting system allowed control of access to the site by limiting the number of divers to twelve and only at specific times. Monitoring after implementing the 'Protected Zone' revealed that divers were still impacting the wreck, but only marginally. The wreck was re-opened after excavation, and has been constantly monitored to gage any disturbance by visitors.

== Archaeological Background ==
In March 1983 the Historic Shipwreck Unit conducted a six-week excavation on the William Salthouse wrecksite. This also involved an extensive stabilization programme. The main objectives were to examine the archaeological potential of the site, and prevent the further loss of loose material that had been previously disturbed by divers and the strong water current. Two 2 metre by 8 metre trenches were cut across the site, one through the main cargo hold area, and the other aft of the mainmast. It was discovered that the site had a very large archaeological potential with the integrity of the hull able to provide information on ship construction, as well as details about food and cargo being carried and packing methods. A large amount of material was recovered, which was conserved and is held at the Heritage Victoria conservation laboratory. The wreckage was also found to be vulnerable to scouring and erosion due to strong currents. Scour holes had increased in size exposing more of the hull. In 1984 to 1985 the site was also constantly monitored by the Maritime Archaeological Unit to gage the amount of damage done by visitors and environmental conditions.

== Analysis and Research ==
The excavations on William Salthouse have resulted in several archaeological investigations in order to better understand the social climate of 19th century colonial trade. Examples of these studies are summarised below include analysis of cask materials, wine contents, and butchering techniques in use at the time of William Salthouse's wrecking.

=== Cask Materials ===
The 19th century was the pinnacle of Cooperage technology, the regulation of cask size and production had a streamlining effect on maritime trade and industry. The cask design was paramount to trade for two reasons; the ability to uniformly apply packing techniques to merchant vessels, and the efficiency of inspecting and calculating materials contained within stowed casks. At this time in the mid 19th century, cask had become a generic term for any type of wooden staved container, and could vary in both size and purpose. For example, cask sizes ranged from a 9-gallon keg to a 252-gallon tun and were designed in three ways depending on the properties of the goods being stored. The manifests of William Salthouse state there were at least 1000 casks of varying size stowed on board when the vessel foundered at Port Phillip Bay in 1841. The high concentration of casks in a single location provided an opportunity to gain information about 19th century cooperage technology, cask marking traditions, cask contents, and stowage methods in a merchant sailing vessel.

The excavation of William Salthouse yielded 36 cask staves, 41 partial or complete cask heads, and sample material of dunnage, hoops, and stowage materials. This combination of materials acted as a representative sample for the ship, with no complete casks being raised due to the subsequent conservation problems they would present. A comparison of the casks to the statues and regulations being imposed by British North America by Staniforth (1987) showed that the quality of casks being excavated consistently fell below set standards. For example, British North American regulations held that cask heads were to be no thinner than 3/4 inch, however excavated cask heads yielded measurements below 1/2 inch thickness. The staves of each cask were meant to have a minimum thickness of 1/2 inch, examination of the staves from William Salthouse show that approximately 30% of the archaeological material falls short of this mark.

There is historical evidence that suggests from the late 18th to early 19th century British North America was continually enacting, amending, and repealing numerous acts of legislation related to the regulation of various facets of inspection, packaging, and shipment from their ports. These continuing changes lend to the idea that it was possible that authorities of the time recognized the difficulty to adhere to fluctuating standards and had the tendency to turn a blind eye when these standards were not kept. In an interesting application of post-processual archaeology, Staniforth (1987) assesses the regulations surrounding the position of inspector, to further analyse the statutes that had been implemented. To become a cargo inspector for import/export goods, an individual was required by law to abstain from any personal investment in the goods passing through the inspection houses. However, William Watson, the inspector responsible for ensuring the quality of casks of flour aboard William Salthouse was married to the daughter of the owner of the largest flour mill on the Lachine Canal and the proprietor of the casks of flour en route to Melbourne. It is likely that the variance in cask quality found in the archaeological record is the result a combination of factors, but the above examples illustrate how complex the system surrounding cooperage and inspection was in the mid 19th century.

Markings on the cask heads allowed maritime archaeologists to easily identify the goods being carried within the casks. These marking were required for exported goods and included information on weight, quality, contents, inspector, location of inspection, and year and month of inspection. By gathering the data from excavated casks, we can learn more about what types of goods were important to help establish and strengthen the newly forming colony at Port Phillip Bay, and test the validity of the historical record through comparison with cargo manifests. In the case of William Salthouse, the small excavation sample has already yielded discrepancies in the cargo manifest related to the grade and quality of salted pork, and types of alcohol being shipped to the budding Australian colony.

=== Wine Identification ===
The testing of bottle contents aboard William Salthouse was an act of necessity as excavated bottles were undergoing rapid deterioration due to poor conservation efforts immediately following their excavation. The three bottle types recovered during excavation were consistent with the three types of alcohol listed on the ships outgoing cargo manifest, which stated that the vessel was carrying over 360 bottles of French Champagne, Sauternes, and Muscat at the time of its departure from Montreal. However, the incoming cargo manifest published in thePort Phillip Herald stated that only French Champagne and Sauternes were aboard William Salthouse when the vessel wrecked on Pope's Eye Shoal. The study of wines aboard William Salthouse would consist of two approaches, a chemical analysis and a less orthodox sensory analysis. The unscientific nature of a sensory analysis, or taste-testing, was included as a means of adding a dimension of wine style that would be lost through a strictly chemical analysis of the wines. The goal of the research was to determine how many wines and which varieties were aboard William Salthouse at the time of its foundering.

The sensory analysis of the wines was undertaken by professional wine tasters in order to establish the intangible features of wines being tested, such as sweet, dry, bitter, and so on. Two public tastings took place, in which tasters were asked to engage in discussion and note the effect of salt on the wines, as well as colour, nose and taste.

The chemical analysis undertaken for Peters' 1994 study of wines aboard William Salthouse acted in juxtaposition to the 1983 study which occurred directly after the wines had been excavated. Evidence had arisen in between tests suggested there were three wines aboard the vessel, as mentioned above. The oenological interpretation of the chemical analysis used contemporary samples of the desert wines as a referential parameter. The levels of acids, sugars and ethanol would therefore be compared with these modern day wines. The results of the chemical analysis found that William Salthouse wines all fell within the parameters of contemporary Sauternes. However, while Muscat today is a fortified, aromatic wine with high sugar levels, it was traditionally an unfortified wine that did not require additional spirits. Therefore, the presumption that the wine styles of Sauternes and Muscat had gone unchanged for the last 150 years was incorrect, and influenced the resulting conclusions of the oenological analysis.

While few answers were drawn from the analysis of wines aboard William Salthouse, the investigation itself proved to be an exercise in formulating new methods and attitudes in archaeological analysis. Importantly, these studies shed light on the weaknesses in conservation techniques and recovery methods which you subsequently be addressed.

=== Butchering Patterns ===
The amount of salted meat aboard William Salthouse at the time of its wrecking provided an archaeological deposit capable of providing a comparative sample in order to assess the presence of salted meat remains in food bone assemblages on Australian historic sites.

Packing methods and meat grading could not be included in the archaeological investigation because samples of meat included in the investigation were highly disturbed, meaning they were not in situ at the time of their recovery. Conservation restraints made the excavation of intact casks too costly, however, analysis of both beef and pork carcasses artefacts recovered from William Salthouse found that these examples of imported salted meats would be indistinguishable from Australian terrestrial sites in Australia due to commonalities in butchering techniques. Similarities between the butcher marks on both ribs and vertebrae recovered from the wreck and Australian butchered meats from the First Government House make the cuts of meat indistinguishable. This similarity merits further consideration, since the square cutting of beef samples shows a high degree of similarity. Butchering practices are further complicated by factors such as type of carcase, quality, meat bearing capacity, consumer taste, economic climate and the source of trade training. The range of external factors that impact use of meat type require investigations to address the relationship of site occupants to forms of supply, and the butchering mark morphology and frequency.

The salted meat recovered from William Salthouse has shown that distinctive similarities between butchering techniques used on packed meat and borne slaughtered meat are evident, however further research on packaged meat aboard William Salthouse, as well as research on terrestrial site assemblages is required. This investigation showed that consideration must be given to the historical context and social climate that influences local butchering patterns.

== Site Conservation ==
A number of different methods were used on William Salthouse wreck site in an attempt to reduce the amount of scouring and prevent further damage. The first attempt included the construction of five small fences in 1985. The intention was that these fences, which measured 1 metre long by 0.5 metres high, would trap seaweed and other materials carried through the water and form a barrier which would cause a build-up of sediment. An inspection later that year indicated that this was not effective. A hand dredge was used to pump sand in from another area, but this was also unsuccessful. Bulk dumping was also conducted, but the result was only an ineffective light layer of sand.

In March 1988 a two-week monitoring programme took place, which made a detailed site plan and a photomosaic. Most importantly this programme also made a sand contour plan of the site, so that the change in the level of sediment could be measured. Results from a later visit in May were compared and it was obvious that sand movement was increasing, and that the hull and contents were so exposed that the structural and archaeological integrity of the site was at risk. Immediate action was necessary to protect it.

A temporary measure was sought to give some extra time in finding a more permanent solution. After looking at several options, it was decided that the most preferable method was to build sandbag walls. These would help to support to the hull as well as act as sand traps to encourage sedimentation. Sandbags are also biodegradable, which is a legal condition implemented by the Port of Melbourne Authority. This project took place through October and November 1988. 23 divers spent 129 hours underwater to distribute the bags and build 6 walls, as well as measure the sand movement. The sandbags were effective in protecting the hull, but could only be a temporary measure as the rest of the site remained relatively exposed.

Sandbagging provided enough support and protection to the hull in order for a more permanent solution to be found, and this solution was artificial sea-grass matting. The product used for this was Cegrass Erosion Control System by Cebo UK Ltd, in Aberdeen, UK. Cegrass is made of closed cell foamed polypropylene strips, 1.6 centimetres wide, with 24 strips on a plastic clip forming an element. The elements used measured 90, 120 and 150 centimetres long. These elements were attached to steel mesh sheets 600 x 240 centimetres with a grid space of 20 centimetres. The purpose of this artificial sea-grass was to trap sediments that were in the water, causing them to build up around the base of the mats. They also slowed the force of the current, reducing its damaging effects upon the hull and the contents of the wreck. 43 mats were used and the process took about two weeks. The project cost A$100,000 altogether, and was funded from a special allocation made by the Victorian Government. Evidence of this method's effectiveness was almost immediate. Within one week 10 to 15 centimeters of sediment had been deposited on all of the mats, and this rate continued until all the scour holes were filled. Within 2 to 3 months sediment was also gradually deposited on the inside area of the wreck, despite continued disturbances of barrels and other artefacts. Light sheets of steel mesh were placed over the exposed areas of the wreck that contained artefacts to prevent their movement off the site. This also acted to establish marine life that accelerated sediment deposition over the area. After 6 months the scouring had been halted over the entire site. Close monitoring continued to keep track of the level of sedimentation.

The use of Cegrass on the William Salthouse wreck site has been effective. This cost-efficient option has greatly reduced the risk of damage to the wreck by environmental conditions and human influences, and the site is a good example for successful in-situ conservation of wooden wrecks.
