= Eumemmerring Creek =

Urban stream in Victoria, Australia

Eumemmerring Creek is an urban creek of the Port Phillip catchment, in the southeastern Greater Melbourne region of the Australian east coast state of Victoria. It joins the Dandenong Creek (of which it can be considered a tributary) to form the partly man-made Patterson River, which in turn drains into Beaumaris Bay.

== Course ==
The creek's headwaters originate in the Dandenong Ranges as various small streams and springs from the hills between Mt. Morton (a small peak just west of Belgrave South) and Lysterfield Park. The formed stream first flows southwards along the western fringe of Narre Warren East, before picking up a number of highly modified drains and turns southwesterly at the northern end of Narre Warren North. After being reinforced by an outflow channel from Lysterfield Lake (known as the Heatherton Road East Drain), the creek meanders further and serves as the suburban boundary between Endeavour Hills, Hallam, Doveton and Eumemmerring, before turning south into Dandenong South. There it picks up a major tributary, the Hallam Main Drain (formed by the confluence of River Gum Creek, Troups Creek and Berwick Town Drain), just after crossing the South Gippsland Highway, and continues southwest into Bangholme to pick up its last main tributary, the Eastern Contour Drain, between Dandenong Valley Highway and the EastLink. It then crosses the EastLink to join the Dandenong Creek just north of the Eastern Treatment Plant to form the Patterson River.

== See also ==
- List of rivers of Australia § Victoria
