= Eastern Treatment Plant =

Sewage treatment plant in Melbourne, Australia

Coordinates: 38°03′40″S 145°10′30″E

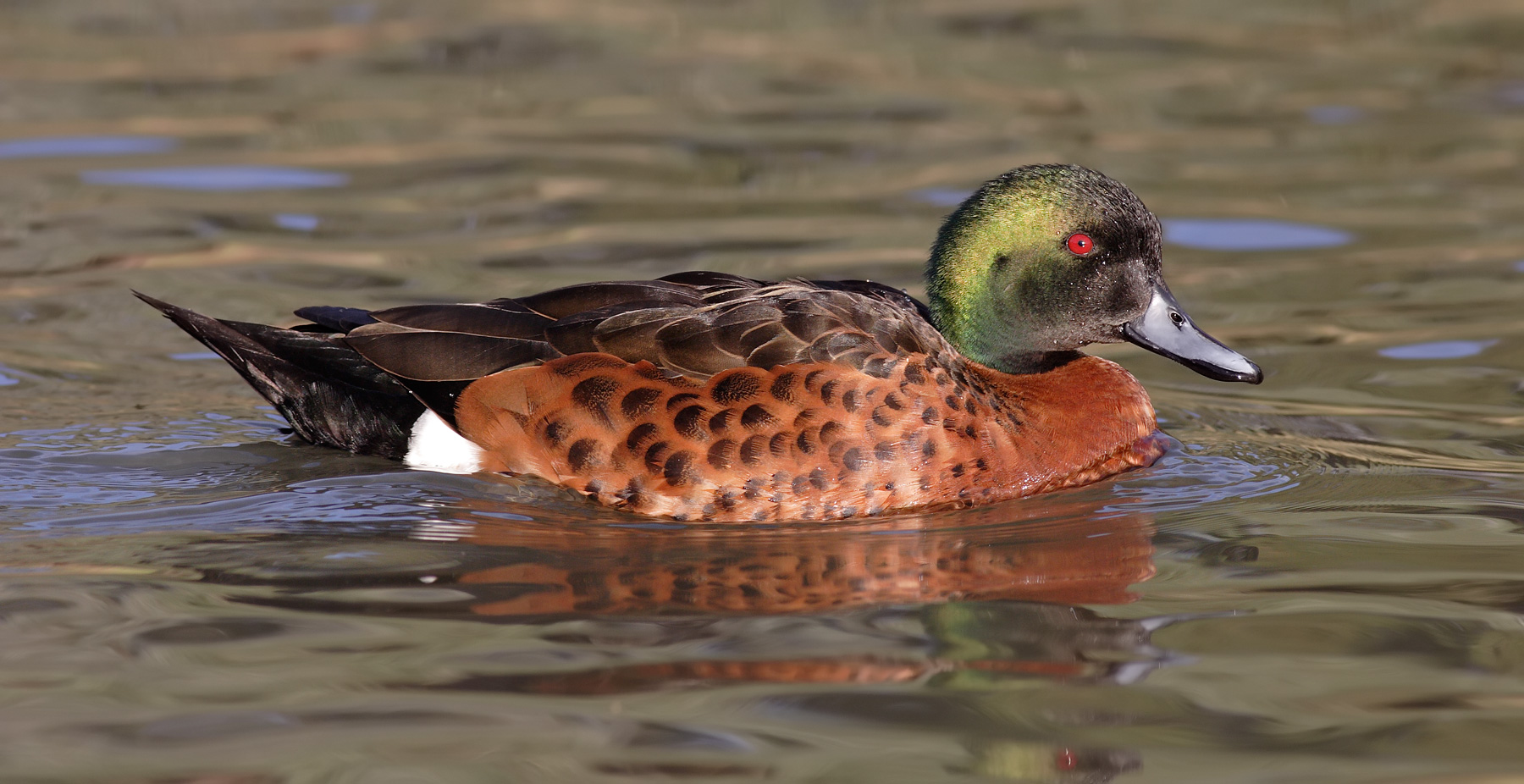
The treatment plant is an important site for chestnut teal

The Eastern Treatment Plant is an 1,100-hectare (4.2-square-mile) sewage treatment plant, located in the suburb of Bangholme in Victoria, Australia, 31 kilometres (19 miles) southeast of Melbourne's central business district.

The plant was built in 1975 and is owned by Melbourne Water. Following treatment, some water is used as recycled water in the local area. South East Water is a major supplier of recycled water from the Eastern Treatment Plant. The rest is pumped through 56 kilometres (35 miles) of pipeline to discharge into Bass Strait at Boags Rocks on the Mornington Peninsula.

== Description ==
The plant is on an 1,100 ha (4.2 sq mi) site bordered by the Patterson River to the north, the Mornington Peninsula Freeway to the west, and the EastLink Tollway to the south and east.

The plant treats around 40 percent of Melbourne's sewage — about 330 megalitres or 270 acre-feet a day — from about 1.5 million people, mainly in the eastern and south-eastern suburbs. It generates some of its own electricity, as well as heating and cooling power from biogas.

=== Upgrade ===
After years of lobbying by community groups led by the Clean Ocean Foundation, as of November 2011, the Eastern Treatment Plant was undergoing an upgrade to reduce environmental impact of the water discharge and increase water reuse applications of the water. The wastewater will be treated by ozone, biological filters, ultraviolet disinfection, and chlorine. The UV disinfection system that will be installed at the Plant will be the largest in Australia, consisting of 7 closed-vessel UV reactors.

== Birds ==
Along with the nearby Edithvale-Seaford Wetlands, the ETP is part of the Carrum Wetlands Important Bird Area (IBA) and supports many bird species of regional, state, national and international conservation significance. Species for which the IBA is globally important are the sharp-tailed sandpiper, blue-billed duck, chestnut teal and Australasian bittern. There is no public access to the ETP for birdwatchers but the birdlife has been monitored since 1998 by monthly surveys conducted by Birds Australia, with 177 species recorded for the site.

== See also ==
- Western Treatment Plant
- Altona Treatment Plant
