= Carrum Carrum Swamp =

Wetlands in Victoria, Australia

Coordinates: 38°04′S 145°07′E

The Carrum Carrum Swamp was a historic coastal wetland encompassing 52 km^{2} (20 sq mi) with a catchment area of 735 km^{2} (284 sq mi). It had four drainage outlets into the Port Phillip Bay, including the modern-day Kananook Creek/Eel Race Drain, Patterson River and Mordialloc Creek (a distributary of the Patterson River's upper section, the Dandenong Creek). Explorer William Hovell discovered "a very extensive fresh water marsh, from 12 to 15 miles long and 11/2 to 6 broad, and only separated from Port Phillip by a narrow ridge or bank of sand not more than from two hundred to three hundred yards wide". A painting titled "Lagoon in the Carrum Carrum Swamp – evening 1872" by James W Curtis is held at the National Gallery of Australia.

Due to modern land developments and drainage measures only remnants of the swamp remain, such as the Edithvale-Seaford Wetlands.

== History ==
Carrum Swamp's waters came from the Dandenong Creek (with headwaters in the moist Dandenong Ranges, and the Eumemmerring Creek with headwaters at Narre Warren. The swamp occupied 5260 ha, extending almost from Mordialloc to Frankston, and had a water catchment of 737 sq km. In its natural state it was covered with dense ti-tree, and it had ineffective outlets to Port Phillip Bay by the Mordialloc Creek and the Kananook Creek. The Carrum Carrum Swamp was drained in 1879 when the Patterson Cut (formed in 1876) and other drainage measures were undertaken to prevent flooding of the Eumemmerring Creek, which overflowed into the swamp. When the Patterson Cut was dug, the area that is now occupied by Patterson Lakes was turned to farmland with mainly dairy cattle. By the late 1960s, farming activities had just about ceased, and the area became popular with fox and rabbit shooters.
