= Carrum =

Carrum Karrum Karrum (Boonwurrung)
- Suburb
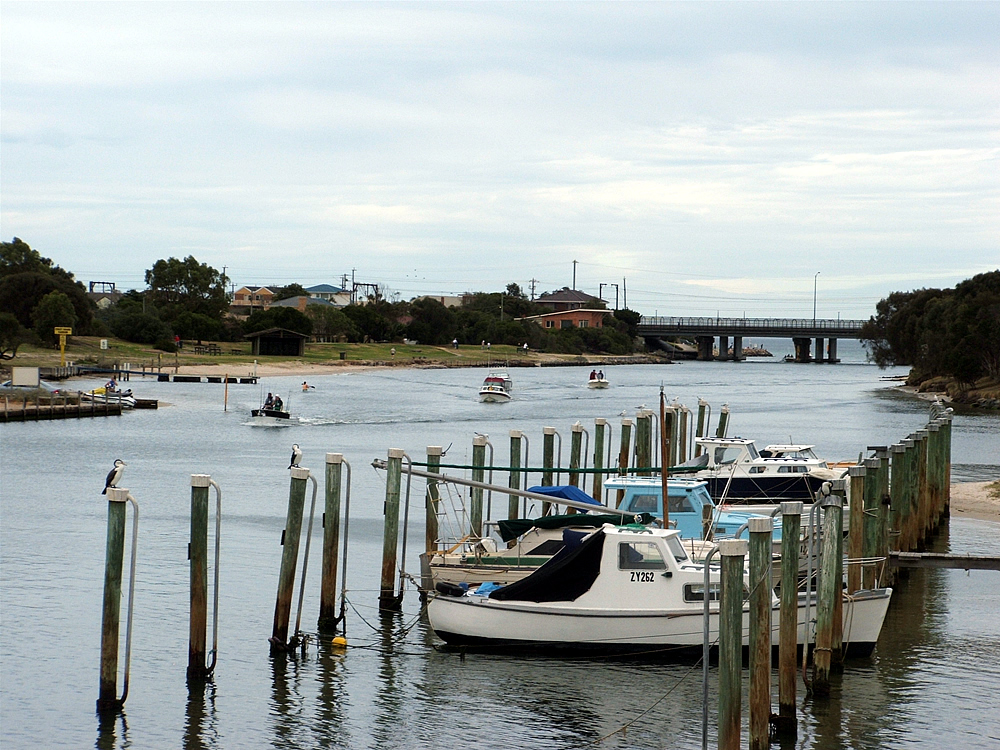
- Carrum from across Patterson River

- Interactive map of Carrum
- Coordinates: 38.076°S 145.122°E
- Country: Australia
- State: Victoria
- City: Melbourne
- LGA: City of Kingston
- Location: 33 km (21 mi) from Melbourne; 8 km (5.0 mi) from Frankston

Government
  - State electorate: Carrum
  - Federal division: Dunkley

Area
  - Total: 1.5 km^{2} (0.58 sq mi)

Population
  - Total: 4,239 (2021 census)
  - Density: 2,830/km^{2} (7,320/sq mi)
- Postcode: 3197
Suburbs around Carrum
Port Phillip	Bonbeach	Patterson Lakes
Port Phillip	Carrum	Patterson Lakes
Port Phillip	Seaford	Carrum Downs

Carrum is a suburb in Melbourne, Victoria, Australia, 33 km (21 mi) south-east of Melbourne's Central Business District, located within the City of Kingston local government area. Carrum recorded a population of 4,239 at the 2021 census.

== History ==
The suburb of Carrum is located on what was originally part of the Carrum Carrum Swamp. The Carrum Carrum Swamp was drained in 1879 when the Patterson Cut (formed in 1876), and other drainage measures were undertaken to prevent flooding of the Eumemmering Creek, which overflowed into the Carrum Carrum Swamp. The swamp opening was mostly only open during the Winter months, so heavy Spring and Summer rains often caused flooding to properties on the edge of the swamp area. It also often caused flood damage as far north as Edithvale. The only remnants of the Carrum Carrum Swamp now form the Ramsar-listed Edithvale-Seaford Wetlands.

Old Carrum had a horse-racing legacy, with stables located in Valetta Street and Tennyson Street belonging to trainers, including Robbie Laing, who is currently training Stars of Carrum.

Carrum has its own railway station which opened in 1882, being the first Railway Station between Mordialloc and Frankston. Carrum Post Office opened on 1 February 1886, some time after the railway.

In 1924 the Carrum Bowling Club was founded; in 1925 the Carrum Surf Life Saving Club was founded; in 1946 the Patterson River Motor Boat Club was founded at the original site of the Carrum Life Saving Club, which relocated to a new site 400 metres south; and in 1966 the Carrum Sailing Club was founded.

A proposal to rename Carrum to Carrum Beach occurred in 2026, avoiding confusion with the inland suburb of Carrum Downs that is currently not being considered further. The first artwork was installed in 2025 at the Beauty Spot for the international standard Patterson River sculpture trail, around the 6km circuit trail.

== Sport ==
=== Cricket ===
The Carrum Cricket Club was established in 1978 with its home ground in the heart of Carrum, in Graham Rd. The cricket club has won 16 senior Premierships since, initially in the FDCA and more recently in the Mornington Peninsula Cricket Association (MPCA). The club's president is Josh Dent, who is also the most recent 1st XI premiership captain, winning the MPCA Sub-District division in 2017/2018. The club has had two state representatives, with Jackson Fry and Lachy Dobson representing the Victorian Country XI.

The club currently fields junior cricket sides in the MPCA with U10s, U12s, U14s, U16s and a girls side. Cricket Australia's Woolworths blast program is also held frequently by the club, with the aim being to create and manage a grassroots level of cricket for Primary School players.

Entrance to Roy Dore Reserve, Carrum

=== Football ===
Carrum Football Club had a proud history from 1911 until it folded due to financial issues in 1996. The Carrum Lions club colours were originally blue and gold, players wore a blue jumper with a gold yolk, this was later change to the Fitzroy Maroon and Blue with a CFC and a Lion on the Jersey. At the same time the club song was changed from the original – "Blue and Gold, Blue and Gold, we will be premiers and you will be told. At the end of the season, we will show you the reason, why Carrum's on top of them all" – to the song "It's a grand old Flag" used commonly by the Melbourne Demons.

Carrum Football Club competed in the various forms of local leagues including the Federal League as Chelsea – Carrum until 1914 when carrum went alone. The Carrum Lions won their first Premiership in the Federal League in 1921. They later joined the Peninsula District and later the Mornington Peninsula Football League and finally the Mornington Peninsula Nepean Football League where they won their Final Premiership in Division 2 in 1994.

Despite folding in 1996, key community members headed by Mark Bollen came together in 2013 and produced a Grand Final contending side in its first year back. The team also managed to field a Reserves and Under 19's side in 2014.

Premiership Flags

- 1921 Premiers Carrum 7.17.59 d Hastings 7.4.46 played at Somerville
- 1933 Runners up to Rosebud 8.12.60 vs Carrum 5.10.40 Played at Dromana
- 1948 Premiers Carrum 17.7.109 d Rye 14.14.98 played at Mornington
- 1955 Premiers Carrum 6.13.49 d Rye 4.10.34 Played at Dromana
- 1959 Premiers Carrum 11.14.80 d Hastings 12.7.79 Played at Mornington
- 1963 2nd 18 Premiers
- 1961 Runners Up Frankston 12.15.87 d Carrum 9.14.68 Played at Mornington
- 1965 Runners up Edithvale Aspendale 11.6.72 d Carrum 8.13.61 Played at Mornington
- 1966 Under 18s Premiers
- 1966 2nd 18 Runners Up
- 1968 2nd 18 Runners up
- 1967 Runners Up Chelsea 20.18.138 d Carrum 11.21.87 Played at Mornington
- 1973 Premiers Carrum 12.14.86 d Hastings 4.17.41 Played at Mornington
- 1974 Premiers Carrum 11.17.83 d Mornington 11.13.79 Played at Mornington
- 1974 2nd 18 Premiers
- 1974 Under 18s Runners Up
- 1975 Runners Up Hastings 18.19.127 d Carrum 10.13.73 Played at Mornington
- 1976 Under 18s Runners up
- 1994 Premiers 2nd Division

League Best and Fairest for Carrum FC include:

- 2nds: L Wangaman 1959, Jack Jelly 1961, H Felmingham 1983
- U18s/17s: 1969 Gary Guy, 1976 Robbie Laing, 1982 Wayne Norrish
- U16s/15s: 1965 Paul Briggs, 1969 Mick Collier, 1971 Glenn Heath, 1983 Jeff Lord, 2006 Mitchell Dicker

Noted players include Ron Stubbs who gained an All Australia Guernsey in 1981 playing for Tasmania. Eric Guy was a noted tough man who played for St Kilda. His son Gary Guy played for Melbourne and Mark Czarnecki who played for Melbourne, Dandenong VFA and Frankston VFA.

Long Time Coaches included Ivan Guy, Norm Stephens, Mal Lord and John Francis Hoyne.

Carrum FC initially played its games at the oval at what is now Keast Park near the Riviera Hotel and moved to the Graham Road oval in the 20s. The Graham Road oval was renamed the Roy Dore reserve in 1985 in honour of long time Carrum CFA Captain, Life Saving Club life member and Football Club President, player and coach, Roy Dore.

=== Surf lifesaving ===
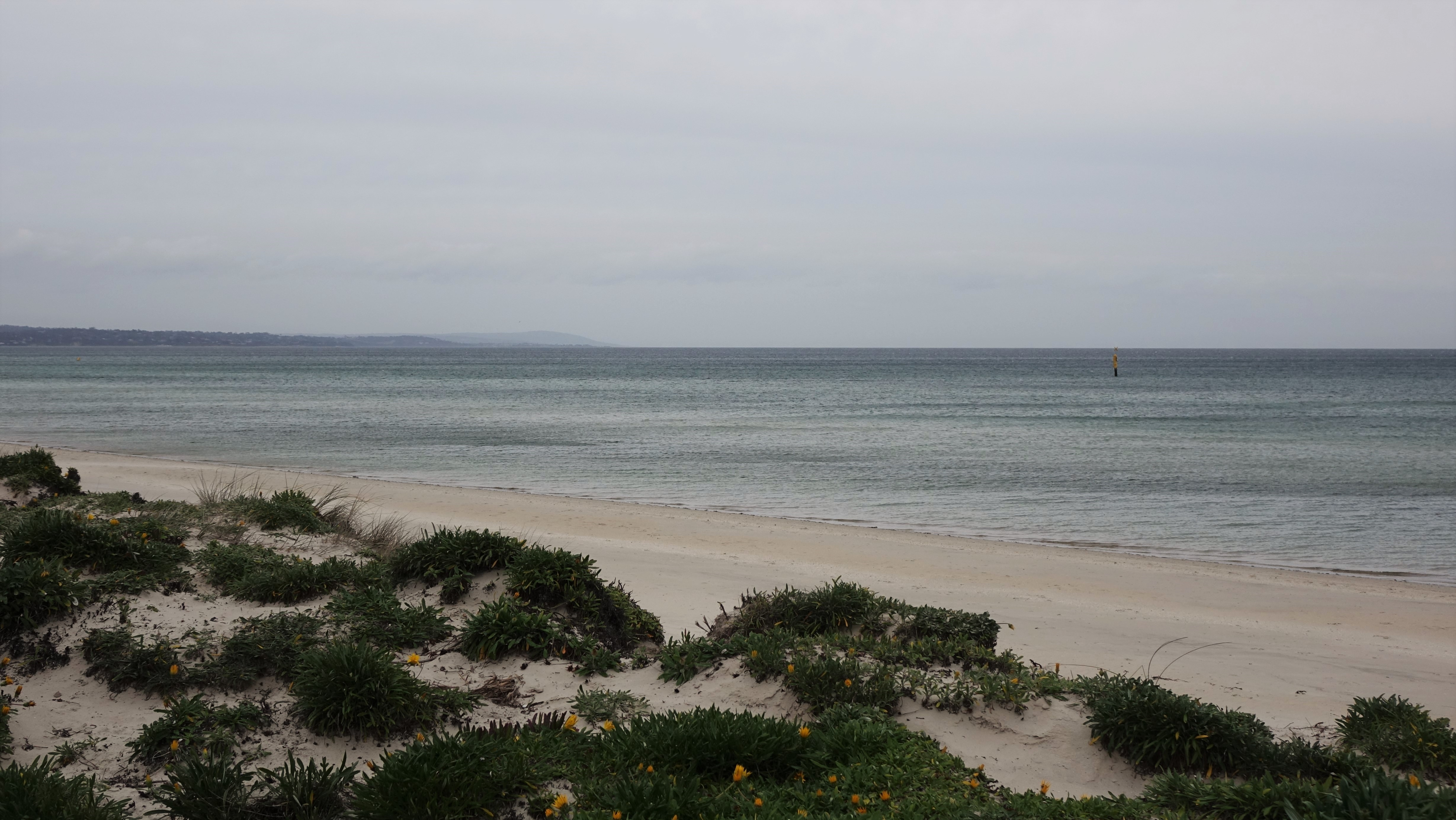
Carrum Beach

Carrum Surf Life Saving Club competes at beach, pool and inflatable rescue boat carnivals held by Life Saving Victoria and Surf Life Saving Australia across Victoria and Australia – including the Australian Surf Life Saving Championships. Over their history the Carrum SLSC has hosted many carnivals, including several Royal Life Saving Society Victorian Championships.

== Education ==
Carrum is serviced by a government primary school, Carrum Primary School, which operates within Carrum and a government secondary school, Patterson River Secondary College, which operates from Seaford on the southern boundary of Patterson Lakes.

Local primary schools:

- Carrum Primary School (closest)
- Patterson Lakes Primary School
- Seaford Primary School
- Seaford North Primary School
- Bonbeach Primary School
- Chelsea Primary School

Local high schools:

- Patterson River Secondary College (Public)
- Frankston High School (Public)
- Mordialloc College (Public)
- Cornish College (Private)

== Politics ==
Chris Howe has been the local City of Kingston councillor since 2024, representing Banksia Ward, which includes the suburb of Carrum.

Carrum is in the Electoral district of Carrum in Victoria's Legislative Assembly, represented since 2014 by Labor MP Sonya Kilkenny.

Carrum is currently in the federal Division of Dunkley and is currently represented in federal parliament by Labor MP Jodie Belyea.

== Media ==
Radio Carrum is a Community Internet Radio Station Broadcasting a variety of unique programs based around the Carrum area. Popular shows include; AFL Gurus, Carrum Cricket Club Show, Friday Night Frothies and The Other Guys. The whole purpose of the station is to allow inspired people to present their findings, passions and obsessions.

Carrum is currently serviced by a single print newspaper, Bayside News.

== See also ==
- City of Chelsea – Carrum was previously within this former local government area.
- Electoral district of Carrum
- Carrum Downs
