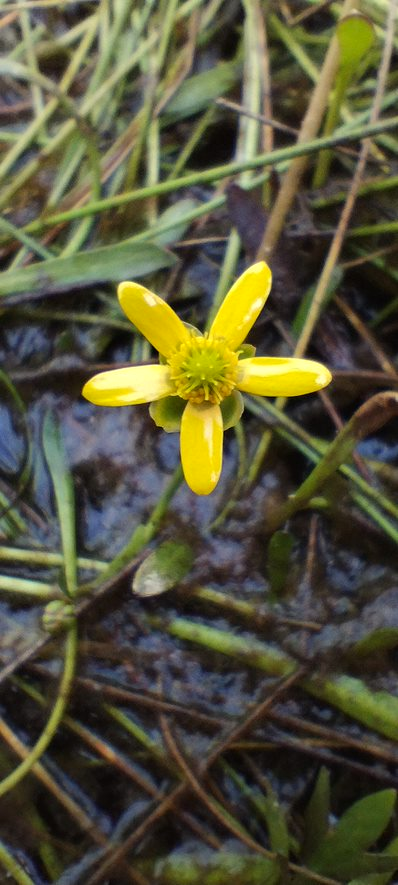
- Ranunculus papulentus flower

Scientific classification
- Kingdom: Plantae
- Clade: Tracheophytes
- Clade: Angiosperms
- Clade: Eudicots
- Order: Ranunculales
- Family: Ranunculaceae
- Genus: Ranunculus
- Species: R. papulentus

Binomial name
- Ranunculus papulentus Melville

= Ranunculus papulentus =

Large river buttercup

Species of buttercup

Ranunculus papulentus, commonly known as the large river buttercup, is a buttercup that is endemic to south-eastern Australia.

== Description ==
The large river buttercup is an upright perennial herb 10–25 cm in height with underground stolons. The flowering stems are slender and erect, 3–30 cm in height. It has 2-4 flowers with spreading, glossy yellow petals.

It has leaves with lamina 2–4 cm long. The three primary segments each have 3–5 lobes or teeth, or are rarely entire. The petiole is usually 4–25 cm long. The petals are 7–12 mm long and 2–4 mm wide. The nectary lobes are elliptical or semicircular. It usually has 12–36 achenes, 1.7–3.6 mm long, with the lateral faces irregularly wrinkled or pitted, or rarely smooth, and when mature often pale and thickened along the dorsal ridge.

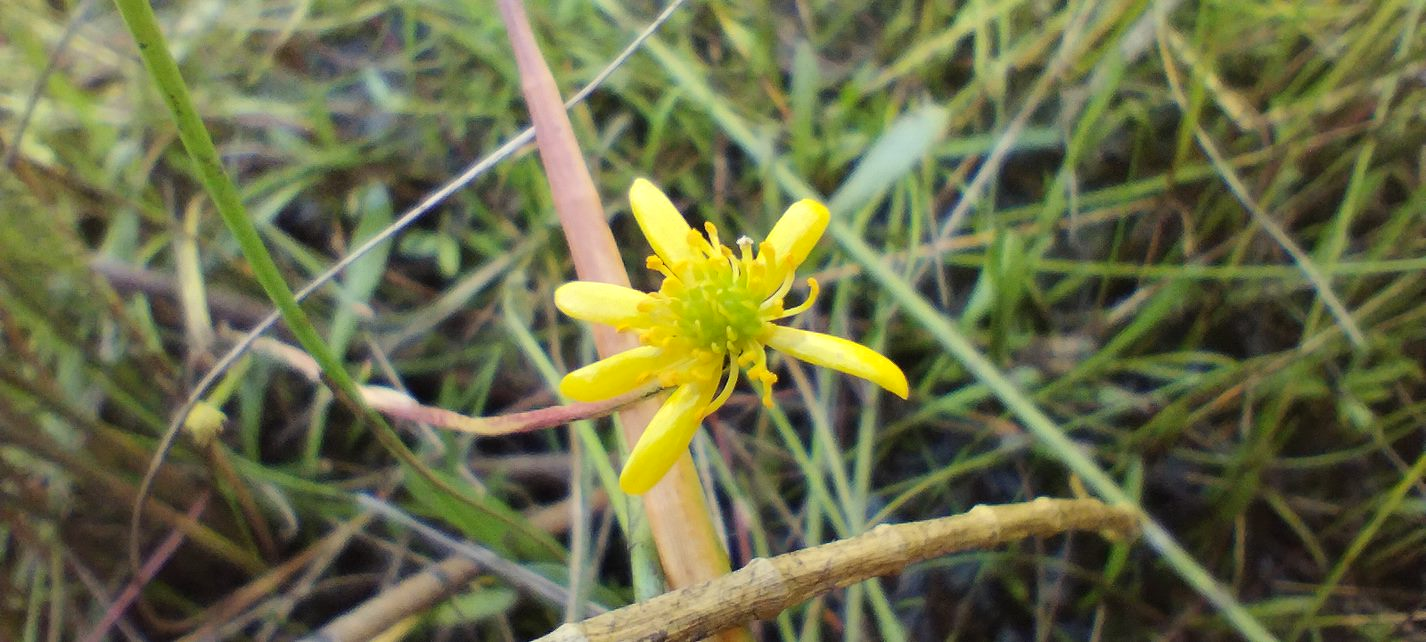
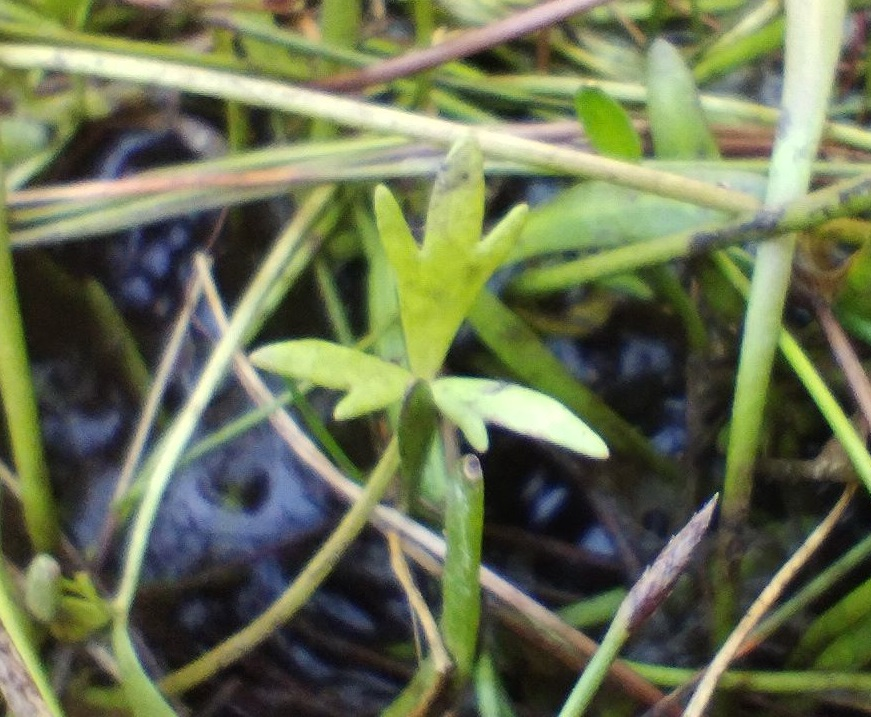
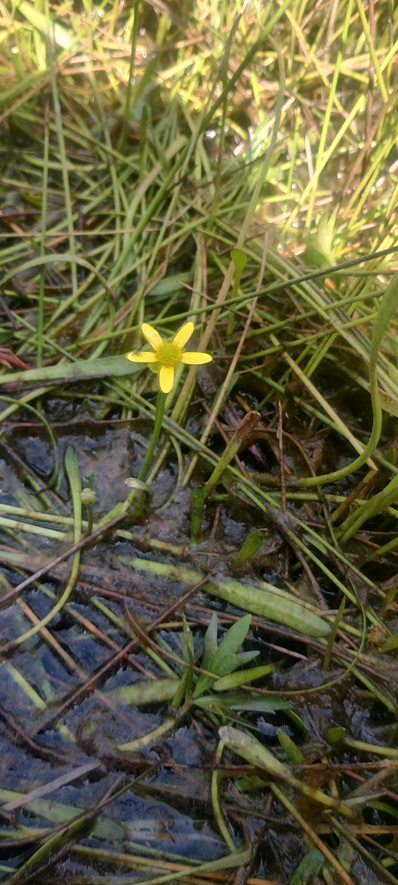
Top: R. papulentus flower and peduncle. Individuals can have 1-4 flowers, each with 5-6 sepals. Bottom left: R. papulentus leaf. Right: Habit of R. papulentus, in a Juncus dominated wetland.

== Distribution and habitat ==
It has been recorded from New South Wales, Victoria, South Australia and the Australian Capital Territory. It occurs in freshwater wetland environments, on mud or in pools.

== Biology and ecology ==
Flowering may occur from spring to autumn. The plant has a rhizomatous habit which aids its spread.
