= Beaumaris Bay =

Bay in Victoria, Australia

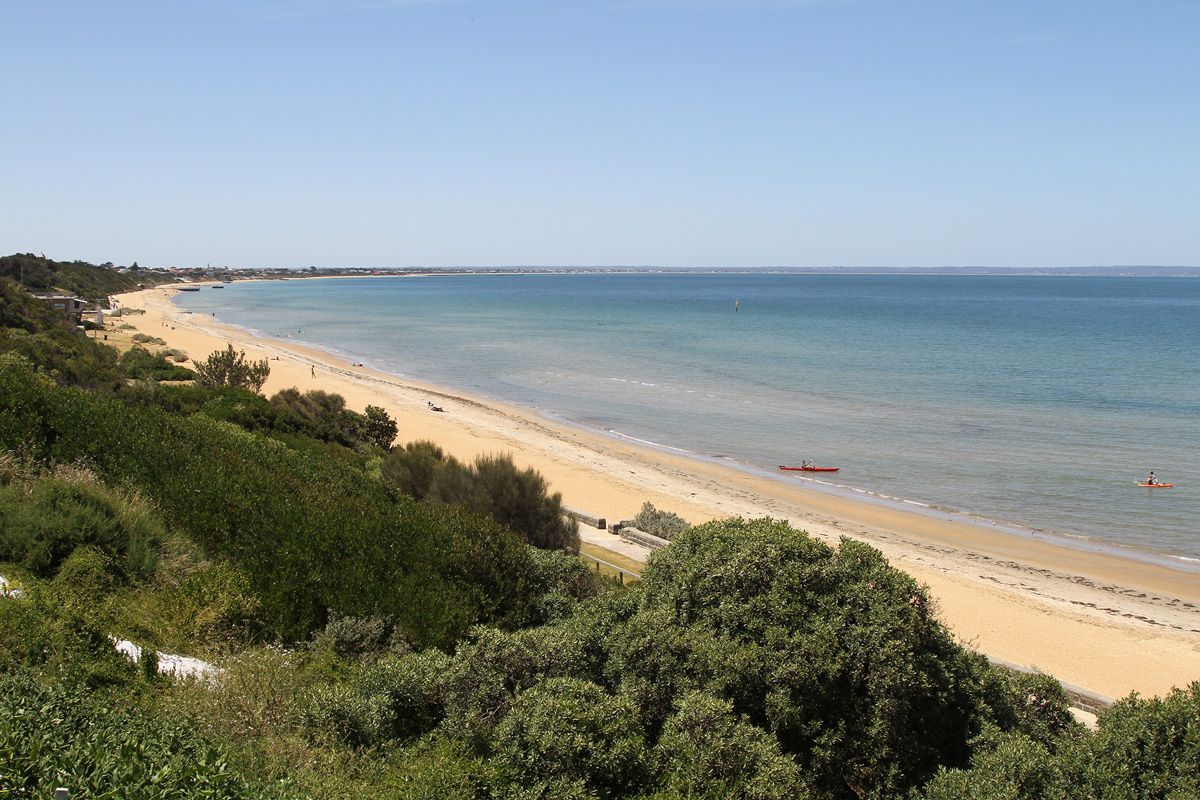
- Looking south-east over Beaumaris Bay from near its northernmost point in Mentone

- Location in Victoria

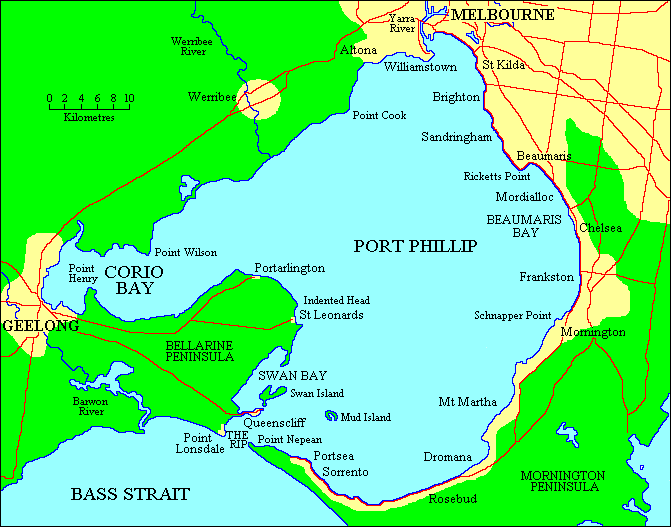
- Map of Port Phillip with Beaumaris Bay in the east
- Location: Victoria
- Coordinates: 37°59′06″S 145°03′15″E
- Primary inflows: Kananook Creek, Patterson River, Mordialloc Creek
- Primary outflows: Port Phillip

Beaumaris Bay (/bjuːˈmærɪs/ bew-MAR-is) is a short but wide bay within the eastern shore of Port Phillip Bay in southern Victoria, Australia. It commences at the cliffs of Rickett's Point in the southern end of the Melbourne suburb of Beaumaris, then recesses north briefly alongside Mentone Beach in Mentone before stretching south through a string of suburban beaches along Parkdale, Mordialloc, Aspendale, Edithvale, Bonbeach, Carrum and Seaford, and ends at a small headland near the Olivers Hill boat ramp at the junction between Frankston and Mount Eliza. The main tributary streams draining into the bay are Mordialloc Creek, Patterson River, Kananook Creek and Sweetwater Creek.

The bay is an important site for the beachgoing, recreational fishing, boating and water sport culture of Melbourne due to its long stretches of fine beachfront, the numerous piers, jetties, boat ramps, marinas and boat clubs along the coast, the proximity to some of the affluent, densely populated suburbs, the ease of access from arterial roads and commuter railways, as well as the relatively calm waves of the Port Phillip Bay. The northern half of the bayside is managed by the Bayside and Kingston City councils and the southern half by the Frankston City council.
