= Kananook Creek =

River in Melbourne, Australia

Coordinates: 38°7′24″S 145°7′32″E

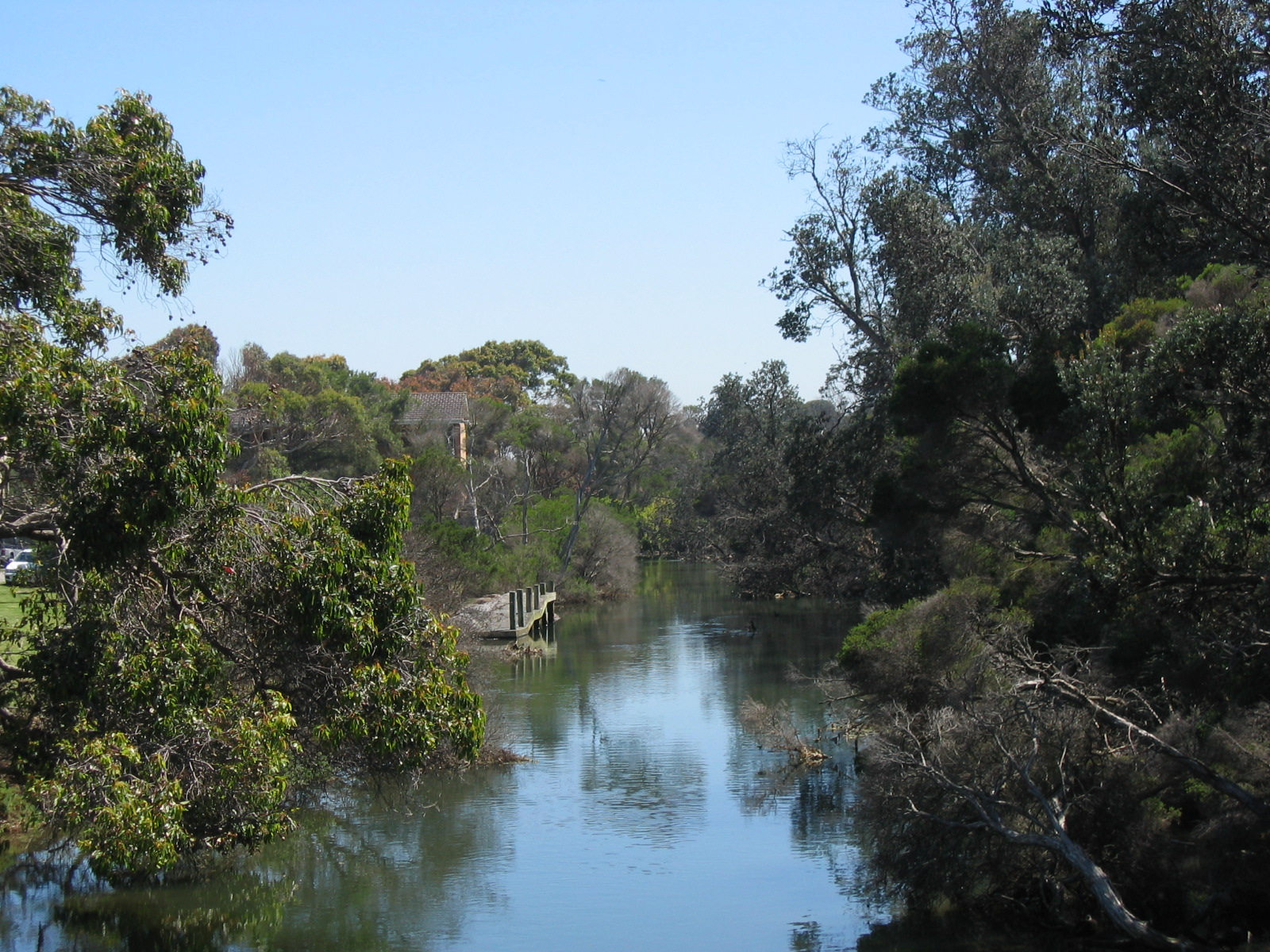
The Kananook Creek Reserve in Seaford

Kananook Creek is a river in south-eastern Melbourne, Australia, 9.6 kilometres (5.965 miles) long. Beginning at the meeting of the Wadsley and Eel Race Drains, it flows parallel to the coast for 7.5 kilometres (4.66 miles) making a peninsula locally called "Long Island", running from Carrum to the river's mouth in Frankston. Kananook Creek flows into Port Phillip.

== History ==
Kananook Creek was once part of the extensive Carrum Carrum Swamp, and was used as a source of fish and eels by the Mayone-Bulluk clan of the Boonwurrung people.

== See also ==
Seaford, Victoria
