= Seaford, Victoria =

Seaford Karrum Karrum (Boonwurrung)
- Suburb
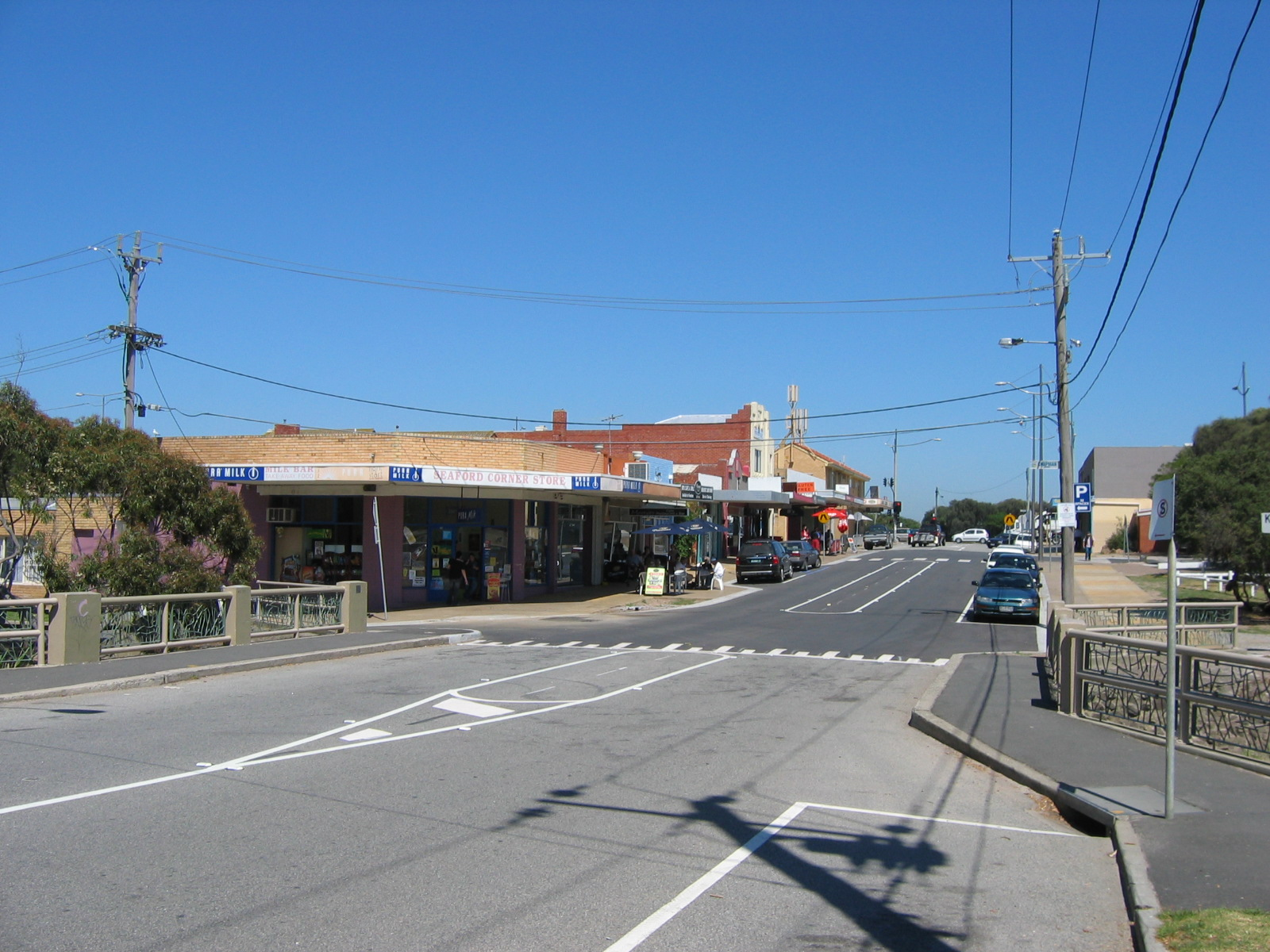
- Station Street, Seaford

- Interactive map of Seaford
- Coordinates: 38.105°S 145.132°E
- Country: Australia
- State: Victoria
- City: Melbourne
- LGA: City of Frankston
- Location: 36 km (22 mi) from Melbourne; 5 km (3.1 mi) from Frankston

Government
  - State electorates: Carrum; Frankston
  - Federal division: Dunkley

Area
  - Total: 11.9 km^{2} (4.6 sq mi)

Population
  - Total: 17,215 (2021 census)
  - Density: 1,447/km^{2} (3,747/sq mi)
- Postcode: 3198
Suburbs around Seaford
Port Phillip	Carrum	Patterson Lakes
Port Phillip	Seaford	Carrum Downs
Port Phillip	Frankston	Frankston North

Seaford is a beachside suburb in Melbourne, Victoria, Australia, 36 km south-east of Melbourne's central business district, located within the City of Frankston local government area. Seaford recorded a population of 17,215 at the 2021 census.

== History ==
Seaford was the site of the Karrum Karrum swamp, which was utilised for food by the Bunurong Aboriginal people. In the early twentieth century, after European settlement, the swamp was drained for farming purposes (with wet areas remaining only at low lands; including Seaford and the Edithvale wetlands).

The name Seaford arose during a meeting of local residents in 1913, called to decide upon a name for the settlement and the new railway station about to open. It was agreed that the name should contain some reference to the sea. Councillor Sydney Plowman suggested "Seaford", dropping the "L" from his home town of Sleaford, in Lincolnshire, England. The suggestion was adopted.

The Seaford Post Office opened on 6 March 1914.

During the 1950s and 1960s, the suburb grew as a result of affordability, and proximity to the beach and Frankston. In 1985 a report was produced titled Ecology and Management of Seaford Swamp, recommending the creation of lagoons, substantial tree plantations and improvement of public facilities. These initiatives were implemented by the City of Frankston and Melbourne Water, using funds from the Melbourne Parks and Waterways Grants Program.

== Sport, recreation and public facilities ==
Seaford is home to several public park spaces including three with barbecue facilities and playground equipment. Seaford Scout Group, one of the earliest Australian chapters, merged with Carrum to form the Seaford Carrum Scout Group.

Seaford is home to Seaford United Soccer Club and the Seaford Football Netball Club competing in the Mornington Peninsula Nepean Football League, both using the 'Tigers' nickname. The suburb is also home to two cricket clubs, the Seaford Cricket Club (Est. 1924) and the Seaford Tigers Cricket Club (Est. 1990) who compete in the Mornington Peninsula Cricket Association. Southern Districts Rugby Club has its base in the north of the suburb.

In February 2011 the Australian Football League's St Kilda Football Club officially opened its $10.25 million training venue at Belvedere Park in Seaford.

=== Seaford Foreshore Reserve ===
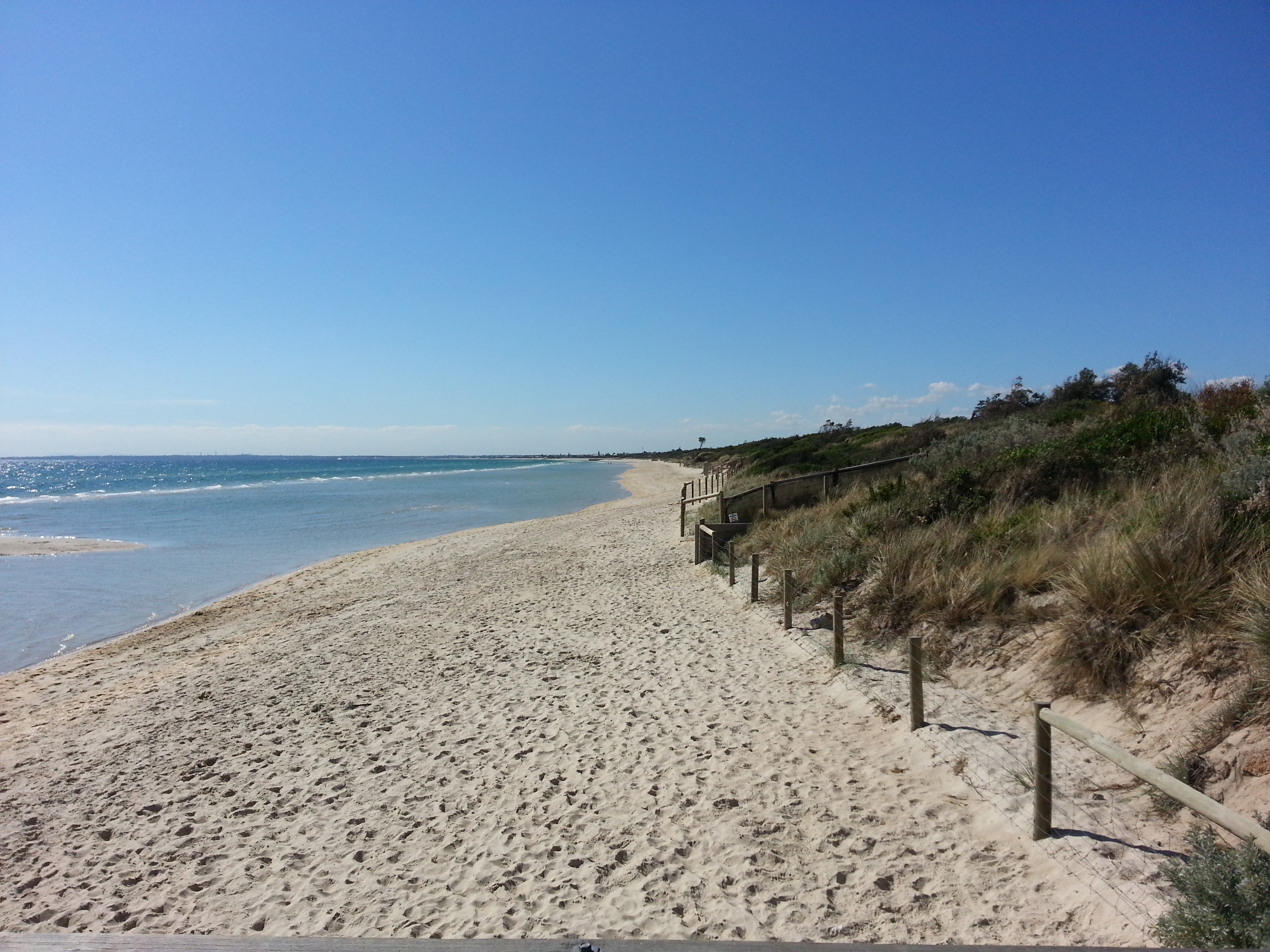
Seaford beach and foreshore reserve, Victoria, Australia

The Seaford Foreshore Reserve is one of the few remaining substantial, continuous strands of natural coastal vegetation near Melbourne. Seaford is notable for this reserve, which divides the beach from Nepean Highway along the whole length of the suburb. This reserve was the site for an extensive dune restoration program undertaken by the Port Phillip Authority in 1972, under the title of the "Seaford Experimental Project". The program involved extensive areas of fencing, revegetation and the installation of walking tracks, seats, tables and shelters.

=== Keast Park ===
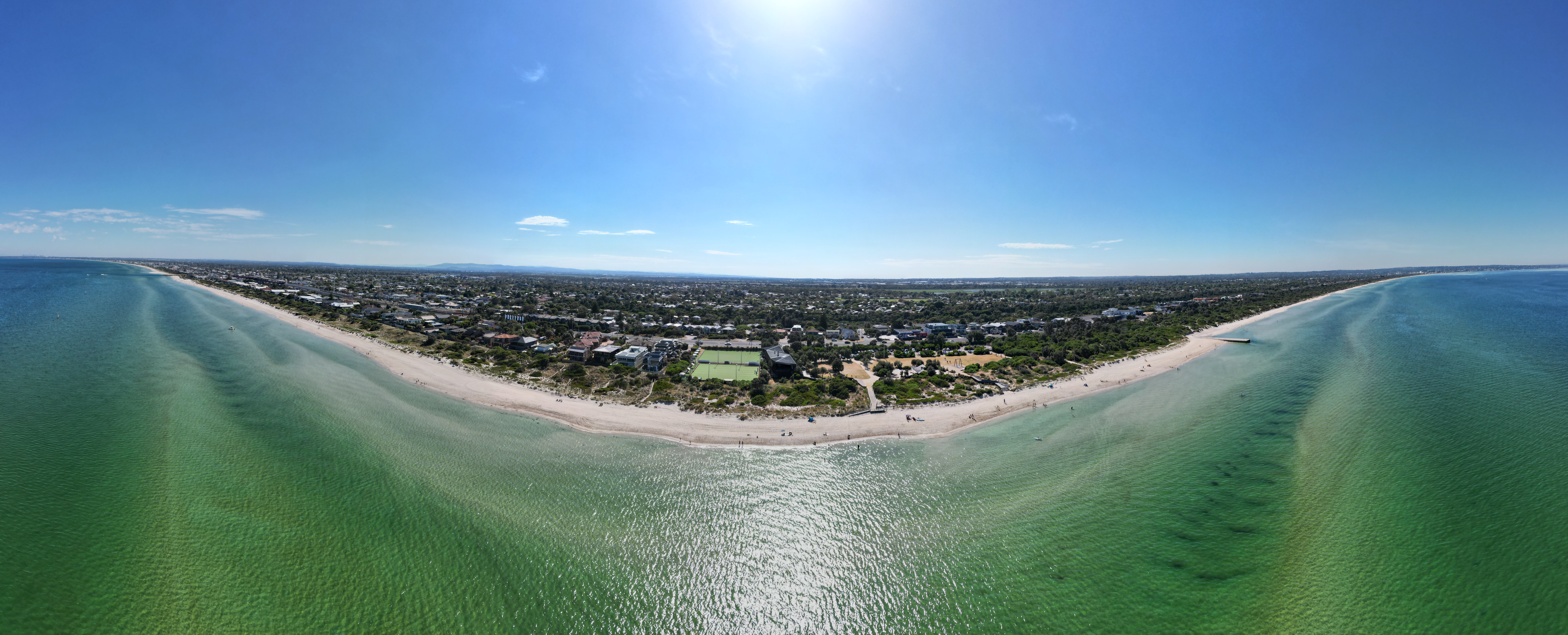
Aerial panorama of Seaford's Keast Park alongside the coastline

Keast Park is a 2.5-hectare (6.2-acre) public park situated at the northern end of the Seaford foreshore on Port Phillip Bay. The master plan for the park was designed in 2004, the project explored ways to protect the ecology of the sensitive foreshore environment with the functional requirements of the public park. The park serves a broad range of functions, including the Carrum Bowls Club, the sea scouts, public toilets and change facilities, a multi-purpose community space and a small café.

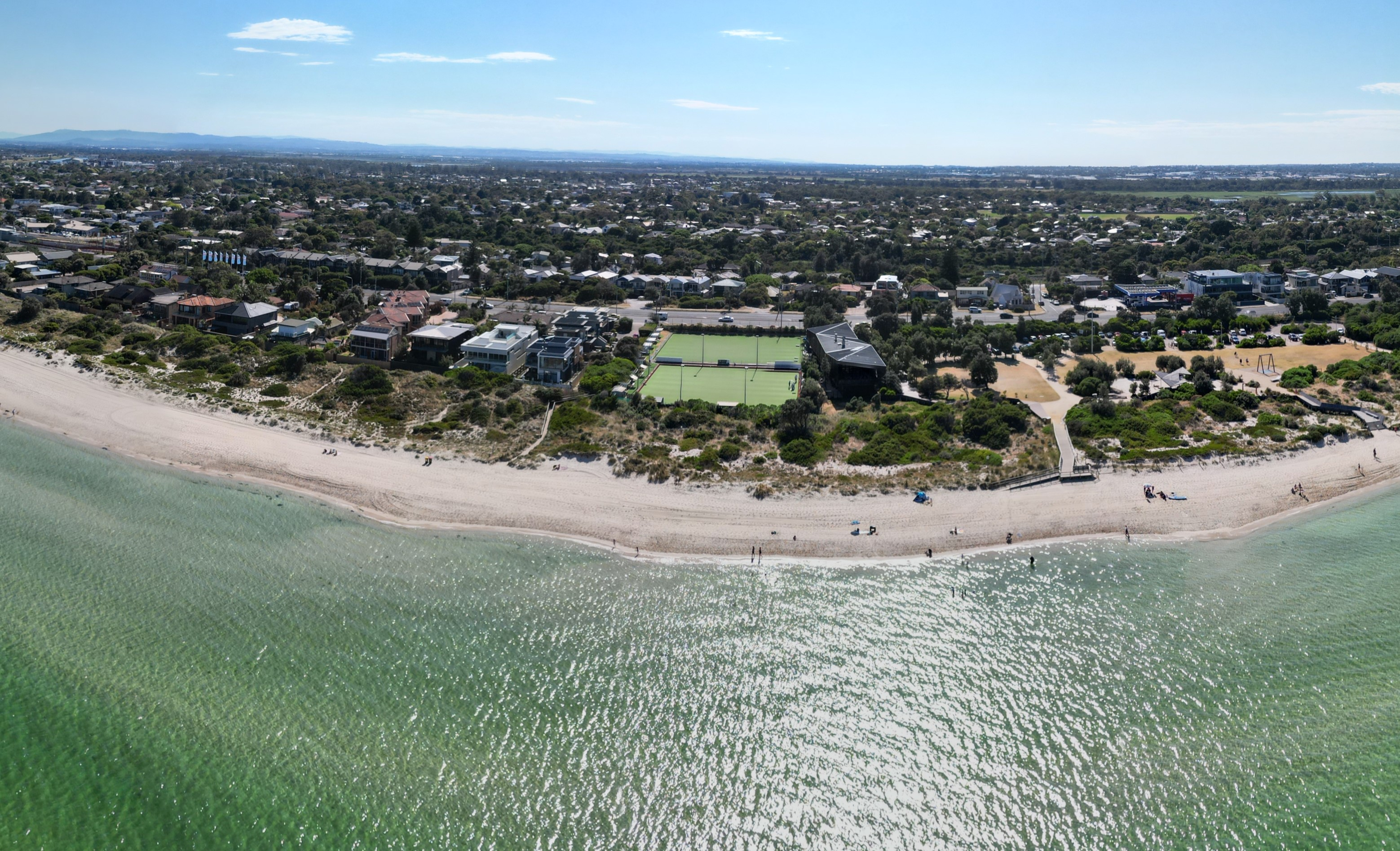
Seaford's Keast Park alongside the coastline

=== Seaford Wetlands ===
Seaford Wetlands is a 305-hectare (750-acre) nature reserve listed on the Register of the National Estate. The wetlands are home to a wide variety of bird life, including a number of rare and endangered migratory species protected by international agreements.

The large numbers and variety of bird life make the wetlands popular with bird watchers. Many migratory birds from as far afield as Siberia visit the reserve from October to March.

There are stands of river red gums around the margins of the Wetlands, some of which are estimated to be around 300 years old. Some have scars where the bark was stripped for use by the Bunurong Aboriginal people prior to European settlement.

The swamp is noted for its prolific and various bird life. Around 130 different species have been observed there in recent years. The more common species are wetland-dependent birds which occur in southern Victoria, such as ducks, swans, rails and pelicans.

A number of rare migratory bird species also visit the wetlands between October and March. These come from Northern Asia and are protected by treaties between the Australian government and the fovernments of Japan and China. Many birds can easily be seen from the vantage points overlooking the wetland's lagoons. Others are more difficult to spot because they prefer the protection of the reed beds.

The wetlands support a small variety of native animals consisting of swamp rat, water rat, snakes and frogs. Three types of fish can also be found in the wetlands: common galaxias, short-finned eels and mosquitofish (an exotic pest species).

=== Kananook walking trail ===
A popular walking trail, split by roads, passes by the Seaford RSL, continuing in both directions.

=== Kananook Creek ===
Once draining part of the Carrum Carrum Swamp, the Kananook Creek runs from northern Seaford where it is fed by the Eel Race Drain and flows southwards through Seaford, roughly adjacent to the Nepean Highway through to Frankston where it flows into Port Phillip.

== Schools ==
There are six primary schools in Seaford, Kananook Primary School, Belvedere Park Primary School, Seaford Primary School, Seaford North Primary School, Seaford Park Primary School and St Anne's Catholic Primary School. And Seaford is also home to a secondary school as well, Patterson River Secondary School is located in the north of the suburb.

== Public transport ==
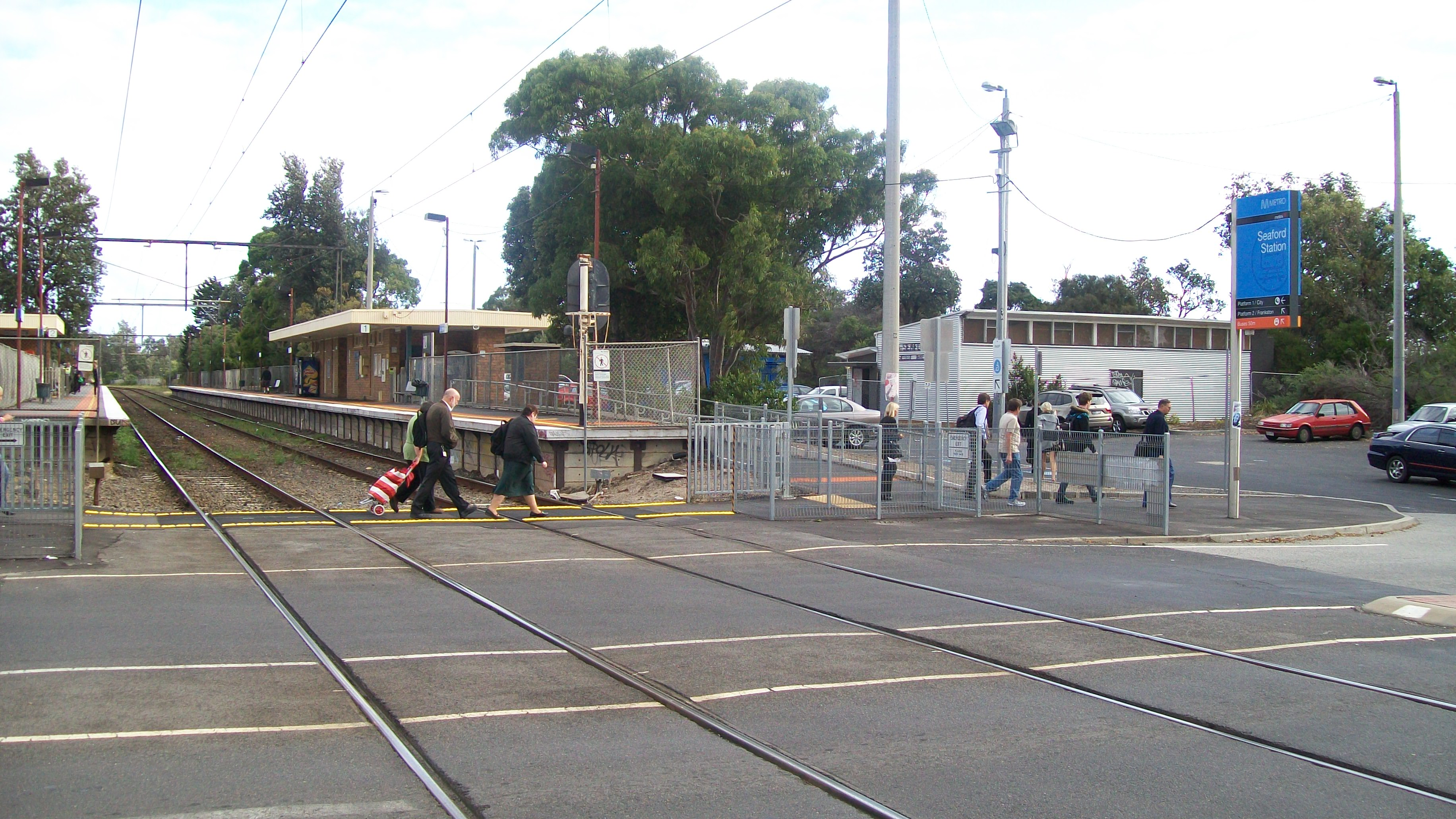
Seaford train station

Seaford is serviced by both Bus and Commuter rail. Two railway stations are within the suburb – Seaford and Kananook – on the Frankston railway line. Both are in Zone 2.

Sarah MacDiarmid disappeared from Kananook Station on 11 July 1990, last seen walking from the station to the carpark.

== State politics ==
Since the state election on 29 November 2014, the majority of the suburb of Seaford has been represented by Labor MP Sonya Kilkenny in Victoria's Legislative Assembly. The majority Seaford falls within the Electoral district of Carrum. The remainder of Seaford, generally south of Seaford Road falls within the Electoral district of Frankston, represented by Paul Edbrooke

== See also ==
- City of Frankston (former) – Seaford was previously within this former local government area.
- City of Frankston – Seaford is located within this local government area.
- List of people from Frankston – notable people from the City of Frankston (including Seaford).
