= Canal community =

Neighbourhood built around a structured waterway

A canal community is a neighbourhood built around a structured waterway, such that what would be the backyard of a typical single family house is replaced with a communal waterway shared with neighbours. The canal is interconnected with additional canals so that they are all connected to a larger body of water, permitting residents to have aquatic access for boating just as an automobile has access to a residential road network. residential property in a canal community can be much less expensive that a traditional waterfront home. However, the lack of water flow in a canal-based system can have deleterious effects on water quality due to contamination or algal blooms.

== Canal communities in Ontario ==
Conceived in the 1960s and built in the 1970s by Hungarian engineer Andrew Zsolt, Lagoon City on Lake Simcoe is the oldest and largest canal community in Ontario, Canada with 16 km of canals. Located in Brechin, Ontario, it is centered on the Trent–Severn Waterway with access to Lake Ontario. Further south, Young's Harbour is also situated on Lake Simcoe, in the Town of Georgina.

Essex County has a number of canal communities due to its mild winter weather. It is home to:

- River Canard in Amherstburg and LaSalle on the Detroit River
- Cedar Island in Kingsville on Lake Erie
- Pike Creek and Lighthouse Cove in Lakeshore on Lake St. Clair.
