= Thompson Road, Melbourne =

Road in Melbourne, Victoria

Thompson Road McLeod Road, Thompsons Road Victoria
- Coordinates: 38.076503°S 145.122518°E (West end); 38.093776°S 145.370145°E (East end)

General information
- Type: Road
- Length: 22.2 km (14 mi)
- Gazetted: July 1919
- Route number(s): Metro Route 6 (1989–present) (Carrum–Clyde North)

Major junctions
- West end: Carrum Promenade; Carrum, Melbourne
- Nepean Highway; Mornington Peninsula Freeway; EastLink; Western Port Highway; South Gippsland Highway
- East end: Thompsons Road; Clyde North, Melbourne

Location(s)
- Major suburbs: Patterson Lakes, Lyndhurst, Cranbourne North

Thompson Road (and its western section as McLeod Road, and its eastern section as Thompsons Road) is a major urban arterial road in the south-eastern suburbs of Melbourne, Victoria, Australia.

== Route ==
The road starts as McLeod Road from its intersection with Nepean Highway at Carrum, immediately crossing under the Frankston railway line and heading east as a two-lane, single-carriageway road through Patterson Lakes; at the intersection with MacLeod Road and Schooner Bay Drive, the name changes to Thompson Road and continues east as a four-lane, single-carriageway road to cross over Mornington Peninsula Freeway, before widening into a four-lane, dual-carriageway road, crossing EastLink to meet Frankston-Dandenong Road at Carrum Downs. The name changes for the last time to Thompsons Road and continues east through Lyndhurst and Cranbourne, crosses over Berwick–Cranbourne Road and Bells Road in Clyde North, to eventually terminate at Smiths Lane just beyond Soldiers Road in Clyde North.

== History ==
The passing of the Country Roads Act 1912 through the Parliament of Victoria provided for the establishment of the Country Roads Board (later VicRoads) and their ability to declare Main Roads, taking responsibility for the management, construction and care of the state's major roads from local municipalities; the later passing of the Developmental Roads Act 1918 allowed the Country Road Board to declare Developmental Roads, serving to develop any area of land by providing access to a railway station for primary producers. Thompson Road from Wells Road in Carrum to Dandenong-Frankston Road in Lyndhurst was declared a Developmental Road on 1 July 1919.

McLeod Road originally terminated at Wells Road 500m south to Thompson Road's current alignment over the Mornington Peninsula Freeway; Thompson Road also terminated at Wells Road 100m north of the current bridge. Both roads were connected along their current alignment due to the construction of its interchange with the freeway (and consequent subsuming of Wells Road into it) when it opened in 1980.

Thompson Road was signed as Metropolitan Route 6 between Carrum and Clyde North in 1989.

The passing of the Road Management Act 2004 granted the responsibility of overall management and development of Victoria's major arterial roads to VicRoads: in 2004, VicRoads re-declared Thompson Road (Arterial #5164) from Nepean Highway in Carrum to Berwick–Cranbourne Road in Clyde North;, with the road undeclared east of Berwick-Cranbourne Road; this declaration formally includes today's McLeod Road and Thompsons Road, but signposts along these sections have kept their original names.

=== Duplication Projects ===
==== Thompsons Road duplication, Carrum Downs ====
This is a $31 million state government-funded project to widen Thompsons Road in Carrum Downs. Works involve widening to provide two lanes in each direction from east of Mornington Peninsula Freeway to EastLink, and three lanes in each direction between EastLink and Dandenong-Frankston Road. Construction started in mid-2008. The works are 4 km long.

==== Thompsons Road duplication, Cranbourne ====
This is a $22 million state government-funded project to widen Thompsons Road in Cranbourne. Works involve widening the road to three lanes in each direction between Lesdon Avenue and Rosebank Drive and two lanes in each direction between Rosebank Drive and Narre Warren–Cranbourne Road. Completed in late 2009. The works are 1.7 km long.

==== Thompsons Road duplication, Carrum Downs to Cranbourne ====
Construction started in December 2016 on a $175 million state government-funded project to widen the 6.5 km section of Thompsons Road between Carrum Downs and Cranbourne. Works involve construction of a new bridge over the Cranbourne railway line, and widening the road to three lanes in each direction between Frankston-Dandenong Road and McCormicks Road and between Western Port Highway and South Gippsland Highway, and two lanes in each direction between McCormicks Road and Western Port Highway. The project was completed in mid-2019, with traffic lights installed at the Frankston-Dandenong Road intersection a year later in July 2020.

=== Thompsons Road Extension ===
A $785 million project has been proposed to extend Thompsons Road east to Koo Wee Rup Road in Pakenham.

== Major intersections ==
LGA	Location	km	mi	Destinations	Notes
Kingston	Carrum	0.0	0.0	Carrum Promenade – Carrum Beach	Western terminus of McLeod Road and Metro Route 6
Kingston	Carrum	0.0	0.0	Nepean Highway (Metro Route 3) – Frankston, Mornington, Mordialloc, City	
Kingston	Carrum	0.2	0.12	Frankston railway line	
Kingston	Patterson Lakes	1.7	1.1	McLeod Road (east) – Patterson Lakes	Eastern end of McLeod Road, western end of Thompson Road
Kingston–Greater Dandenong boundary	Patterson Lakes–Bangholme boundary	2.6	1.6	Mornington Peninsula Freeway (M11) – Dingley Village, Frankston, Portsea	Diamond interchange
Frankston–Greater Dandenong boundary	Carrum Downs–Bangholme boundary	5.5	3.4	EastLink (M3) – Frankston, Ringwood, City	Diamond interchange
Frankston–Greater Dandenong boundary	Carrum Downs–Lyndhurst–Bangholme tripoint	6.6	4.1	Frankston–Dandenong Road (Metro Route 9) – Frankston, Dandenong	Eastern end of Thompson Road, western end of Thompsons Road
Greater Dandenong–Casey–Frankston tripoint	Lyndhurst–Skye–Cranbourne West tripoint	10.6	6.6	Western Port Highway (M780) – Hastings, Dandenong, City	
Casey	Cranbourne–Cranbourne North–Cranbourne West tripoint	12.8	8.0	Cranbourne railway line	
Casey	Cranbourne–Cranbourne North boundary	13.8	8.6	South Gippsland Highway (A21 north/B21 south) – Dandenong, Cranbourne	
Casey	Cranbourne–Cranbourne North–Cranbourne East tripoint	15.6	9.7	Narre Warren Road (C404 north/A404 south) – Narre Warren, Cranbourne, Phillip Island	
Casey	Clyde North–Cranbourne North boundary	19.0	11.8	Berwick–Cranbourne Road (C407) – Clyde, Berwick	Eastern terminus of Thompson Road (declared) and Metro Route 6
Casey	Clyde North	21.3	13.2	Bells Road (A17) – Beaconsfield	
Casey	Clyde North	22.2	13.8	Soldiers Road – Beaconsfield	Eastern end of Thompsons Road (sign-posted)
1.000 mi = 1.609 km; 1.000 km = 0.621 mi: Route transition
