= Sandhurst, Victoria =

Sandhurst
- Suburb
- Interactive map of Sandhurst
- Coordinates: 38.081°S 145.207°E
- Country: Australia
- State: Victoria
- City: Melbourne
- LGA: City of Frankston
- Location: 37 km (23 mi) from Melbourne

Government
  - State electorate: Carrum
  - Federal division: Dunkley

Population
  - Total: 5,211 (2021 census)
- Postcode: 3977
Suburbs around Sandhurst
Bangholme	Lyndhurst	Lynbrook
Patterson Lakes	Sandhurst	Skye
Seaford	Carrum Downs	Skye

Sandhurst is an official bounded locality in Melbourne, Victoria, Australia, 37 km south-east of Melbourne's Central Business District, located within the City of Frankston local government area. Sandhurst recorded a population of 5,211 at the 2021 census.

In addition to paying rates to Frankston City Council, Sandhurst residents also have pay fees to one of two owners’ corporations (Sandhurst Club for those east of McCormicks Road, or Sandarra Owners Corporation for those west) who own the land and operate most typical council services in the suburb including security, park management and road maintenance.

Sandhurst is a suburb located next to Carrum Downs and Skye. The main primary schools children attend from Sandhurst are St Joachims, Banyan Fields and Rowelen Park, and Flinders Christian Community College, all in Carrum Downs. The main secondary schools children attend from Sandhurst are Carrum Downs Secondary College and John Paul College in Frankston.

== History ==
Sandhurst was formerly part of Skye and Carrum Downs before the Sandhurst Club bought the land Sandhurst is on in the early 2000s.

Prior to 15 December 1994, the area now Sandhurst was part of the City of Cranbourne (formerly the Shire of Cranbourne until April 1994), and shares its postcode 3977 with Skye, Devon Meadows and Cranbourne.

== Sandarra ==
Sandarra is the section of Sandhurst to the west of McCormicks Rd. The land which Sandarra is on was formerly part of Carrum Downs (the land to the east of McCormicks Rd was part of Skye. The land that Sandarra is on was acquired by the Sandhurst Club after the Skye section was acquired.

== State Politics ==
Since the state election on 29 November 2014, The suburb of Sandhurst has been represented by Labor MP Sonya Kilkenny in Victoria's Legislative Assembly. Sandhurst falls within the Electoral district of Carrum.

== See also ==
- City of Frankston – Sandhurst is located within this local government area.
- List of people from Frankston – notable people from the City of Frankston (including Sandhurst).
