= South Gippsland Freeway =

South Gippsland Freeway Victoria
- Coordinates: 37.990915°S 145.254689°E (North end); 38.039324°S 145.246712°E (South end)

General information
- Type: Freeway
- Length: 6.0 km (3.7 mi)
- Opened: 1972-78
- Route number(s): M780 (2025–present)
- Former route number: M420 (1997–2025) Entire route; M1 (1997–2003) (Doveton–Eumemmerring); National Route 1 (1988–1997) (Doveton–Eumemmerring); Metro Route 65 (1988–1997) (Eumemmerring–Lyndhurst); Freeway Route 81 (1973–1988) (Doveton–Eumemmerring)

Major junctions
- North end: Monash Freeway; Doveton, Melbourne
- Princes Highway; South Gippsland Highway
- South end: Western Port Highway; Lynbrook, Melbourne

Location(s)
- Major suburbs / towns: Eumemmerring, Dandenong South

Highway system
- Highways in Australia; National Highway • Freeways in Australia; Highways in Victoria

South Gippsland Freeway is a short freeway linking Dandenong in Melbourne's south–east to other south–eastern destinations, including the Mornington Peninsula and the Gippsland region. The freeway bears the designation M780.

== Route ==
South Gippsland Freeway starts at the interchange with Monash Freeway in Endeavour Hills and runs south as a four-lane, dual-carriageway route, under the Princes Highway at Eumemmering, over the Pakenham railway line, then along the western border Hampton Park until it ends at the interchange with the South Gippsland and Western Port Highways in Lynbrook.

The standard travel time on the South Gippsland Freeway is 4 minutes (city-bound) and 3 minutes (Lynbrook-bound). The usual peak period travel time, is between 6–8 minutes. However, in times of extreme congestion or roadworks, including being residual due to an incident, the travel time can well exceed 10 minutes.

== History ==
Plans for a "Mulgrave By-pass Road and Eumemmerring By-pass Road" had been made as far back as 1966, between Warrigal Road in Chadstone and Princes Highway at Eumemmerring. The freeway began as an overflow from construction of Mulgrave Freeway (now Monash Freeway) in 1970, where the freeway entered a sweeping turn south, crossed Eumemmerring Creek in Doveton and officially terminated at Princes Highway in Eumemmerring: this section opened in 1972 as Eumemmering Freeway, and was later renamed South Gippsland Freeway in April 1974. The freeway was extended 2.5 kilometres further south to terminate at the original alignment of the South Gippsland Highway where it met Pound Road in 1976.

The last extension 3.5 kilometres south connected Pound Road to Lyndhurst, where Lyndhurst Road (renamed Dandenong-Hastings Road not long afterwards) met the South Gippsland Highway. The highway's old alignment was duplicated and upgraded into the new stretch of the freeway, and a new dual-carriageway alignment of the South Gippsland Highway was constructed approximately a kilometre to the freeway's west. Pound Road was extended a few hundred metres west across a new bridge over the freeway, with Dandenong-bound ramps. Lyndhurst Interchange, where the freeway and the old and new alignments of the South Gippsland Highway met, was reconstructed to allow traffic to head south via an overpass above the realigned South Gippsland Highway to Dandenong-Hastings Road.

Extensions to the Mulgrave Freeway – renamed the South Eastern Arterial in 1988, subsuming the section between Doveton and Eumemmering – also resulted in heavier use of the South Gippsland Freeway. The bridge over Lyndhurst Interchange was duplicated with little fanfare in the late 1998s, leading to increased use of the road, mostly to semi-trailers and heavy freight to get to the docks in the Westernport district (Dandenong-Hastings Road was yet again renamed the Western Port Highway to reflect this and was eventually duplicated). Traffic levels dropped substantially when the Hallam bypass opened in 2003; the South Gippsland Freeway was extended back to its original terminus in Doveton at a new junction with the Monash Freeway.

In 2010, the Pound Road half-diamond interchange was substantially upgraded with a new four-lane carriageway being constructed over the freeway, the addition of traffic lights to the on-ramp intersection, and ramp metering signals. These works were completed late 2011.

In recent years, the freeway has become very busy, carrying high volumes of traffic off the South Gippsland Highway, Western Port Highway and the Pound Road and Princes Highway on-ramps. The freeway attracts all these vehicles, a large proportion of which are freight (hence two ramp metering sites inbound have a priority lane), due to the Monash Freeway which connects to it, being the major south-east freeway leading to Melbourne City. It is also the only freeway (or non-tollway, such as EastLink) to the city. It has led to slow or heavy traffic (inbound) during the morning peak and gets even more congested when the Monash Freeway is already heavy. Outbound is not so bad, although when very heavy traffic comes off the Monash Freeway (outbound), it can cause a bottleneck near and around the Princes Highway interchange, so a ramp signal site was installed to meter out traffic and reduce flow breakdown.

So, as part of the major 2007 M1 (Monash-CityLink-WestGate) Upgrade; which included widening to more lanes, updates to safety, electronic drive time signs and associated arterial road real-time information signs and a freeway management system with ramp metering (key component). The freeway was also upgraded to include a Freeway Management System, from its start at the South Gippsland Highway interchange to the Monash Freeway junction. It added Ramp Metering signals to the South Gippsland Freeway / Pound Road / Princes Hwy (inbound) on-ramps (the outbound on-ramp already had an existing metering site). With this, it also included electronic real-time information signs on the three inbound on-ramps, showing travel times and flow conditions downstream from that respective location to either destinations on the Monash Freeway and/or South Gippsland Freeway. Therefore, it also included installation of hundreds of new in-road sensors on the freeway with associated access point poles, data stations and CCTV cameras. It is completely integrated with the M1 Monash Freeway.

=== Timeline of development ===
- 1972: Mulgrave and Eumemmerring Freeways, total 3.5 miles (5.6 km) from Princes Highway, Eumemmerring to Stud Road, Dandenong North, opened by the Governor of Victoria Sir Rohan Delacombe, 21 November 1972, total cost A$6.8 million.
- 1976: South Gippsland Freeway, dual carriageways completed between Princes Highway and Pound Road, Hampton Park, as well as the southbound carriageway to Dandenong-Hastings Road, opened 6 December 1976 at a cost of $12 million.
- 1977/78: Northbound carriageway from Pound Road to Dandenong-Hastings Road completed.
- 2011: Pound Road interchange reconstruction, opened late 2011.

=== Road classification ===
The freeway was signed Freeway Route 81 upon its opening in 1972, until its replacement with National Route 1 in 1988 (with a portion of it renamed to the South Eastern Arterial) until the Princes Highway in Eumemmering, and the remaining stretch between Eumemmering and Lyndhurst Interchange allocated Metropolitan Route 65. With Victoria's conversion to the newer alphanumeric system in the late 1990s this was replaced by routes M1 and M420 respectively. When the Hallam bypass opened and route M1 reallocated along it in 2003, route M420 was officially extended north to the new junction with the Monash Freeway. In 2025, M420 was rerouted through Koo Wee Rup after Koo Wee Rup Road was upgraded to a dual carriageway highway between the Princes Freeway and Koo Wee Rup Bypass. The freeway was therefore redesignated as M780.

The passing of the Road Management Act 2004 granted the responsibility of overall management and development of Victoria's major arterial roads to VicRoads: in 2004, VicRoads re-declared South Gippsland Freeway (Freeway #1310) from Monash Freeway at Doveton to Western Port Highway in Lynbrook.

== Exits ==
LGA	Location	km	mi	Destinations	Notes
Casey	Doveton	0.0	0.0	Monash Freeway (M1) – Chadstone, City	Northern terminus of freeway and route M780; no northbound exit to Monash Freeway eastbound
Casey	Eumemmerring	1.8	1.1	Princes Highway (Alt National Route 1) – Dandenong, Berwick, Warragul	
Greater Dandenong	Dandenong South	4.3	2.7	Pound Road (Metro Route 12) – Hampton Park, Dandenong South	Southbound exit and northbound entry only
Greater Dandenong	Lynbrook	6.0	3.7	South Gippsland Highway (A21) – Dandenong, Cranbourne, Phillip Island	Partial cloverleaf interchange
Greater Dandenong	Lynbrook	6.0	3.7	Western Port Highway (M780) – Cranbourne South, Hastings	Southern terminus of freeway; route M780 continues south along Western Port Highway
1.000 mi = 1.609 km; 1.000 km = 0.621 mi: Incomplete access; Route transition

== See also ==
- Freeways in Australia
- Freeways in Melbourne
- Road transport in Victoria
