= Harry Selover =

Australian rules footballer

Personal information
- Full name: Henry Thomas Selover
- Born: 24 July 1898; South Yarra, Victoria
- Died: 18 May 2001 (aged 102); Carrum Downs, Victoria
- Original team: South Yarra
- Height: 177 cm (5 ft 10 in)
- Weight: 71 kg (157 lb)

Playing career^{1}
Years	Club	Games (Goals)
1919	Melbourne	3 (2)
- ^{1} Playing statistics correct to the end of 1919.

Henry Thomas Selover (24 July 1898 – 18 May 2001) was an Australian rules footballer who played with Melbourne in the Victorian Football League (VFL).

== Family ==
The fourth and youngest child of William Henry Selover, and Ellen Selover (1869-1943), née Vincent, Henry Thomas Selover was born at South Yarra, Victoria on 24 July 1898.

He married Eileen Mary Ambrose (1902-1993) on 14 August 1924. They had two children: Wendy Patricia Selover (1925-1999), later Mrs. George Henry Yates, and Peter Vincent Selover (1929-2017).

== Death ==
He died at Carrum Downs, Victoria on 18 May 2001.
