= Skye, Victoria =

Suburb and semi-rural locality in Victoria, Australia

Skye
- Suburb
- Interactive map of Skye
- Coordinates: 38.119°S 145.200°E
- Country: Australia
- State: Victoria
- City: Melbourne
- LGA: City of Frankston
- Location: 36.8 km (22.9 mi) from Melbourne; 5.7 km (3.5 mi) from Frankston; 13.2 km (8.2 mi) from Cranbourne

Government
  - State electorate: Carrum
  - Federal division: Dunkley

Area
  - Total: 19 km^{2} (7.3 sq mi)

Population
  - Total: 8,088 (2021 census)
  - Density: 426/km^{2} (1,103/sq mi)
- Postcode: 3977
Suburbs around Skye
Sandhurst	Lyndhurst	Lynbrook
Carrum Downs	Skye	Cranbourne West
Frankston North	Langwarrin	Cranbourne South

Skye is a suburb in Melbourne, Victoria, Australia, 36 km south-east of Melbourne's central business district via the Monash Freeway, located within the City of Frankston local government area. Skye recorded a population of 8,088 at the 2021 census.

== History ==
Skye Post Office opened on 1 June 1889 and closed in 1895. In 1964, Lyndhurst South office (open since 1902) was renamed Skye. This office closed in 1972.

There are still a couple of houses standing from the 1890s today in Skye.

Prior to 15 December 1994, Skye was a part of the City of Cranbourne (formerly the Shire of Cranbourne until April 1994). It still shares the postcode, 3977, with Cranbourne.

In January 2018, Skye's Darnley Drive and Skye Valley residential developments were threatened by the Carrum Downs Bushfire, with a few houses damaged.

== Transport ==
Public Transport

Skye is serviced by one local bus service, the 760 operated by Ventura Bus Lines, which connects Skye to neighbouring suburbs as well as two railway lines – Frankston and Cranbourne

Road

To the east of Skye is the Western Port Highway which connects Skye to Dandenong, Hastings and Melbourne.

To the west is Peninsula Link which connects Skye to Mornington and Rosebud; EastLink which connects Skye to Ringwood and Dandenong; Dandenong Valley Highway which connects Skye to Frankston and Dandenong and the Nepean Highway which connects Skye to Chelsea and Portsea.

To the north is Thompsons Road which connects Skye to Carrum and Clyde North.

To the south is Cranbourne Road which connects Skye to Frankston and Cranbourne

== Education ==
Primary Schools

The suburb has two schools, Skye Primary School and Lighthouse Christian College. Many Skye children also opt to attend larger schools in Carrum Downs such as St Joachim's Catholic Primary School, Rowellyn Park Primary School, Banyan Fields Primary School and Flinders Christian Community College.

Secondary Schools

There are no secondary schools in Skye however in neighbouring suburb Carrum Downs there are two high schools, Flinders Christian Community College and Carrum Downs Secondary College. There is also two high schools in neighbouring suburb Cranbourne West, Cranbourne West Secondary College and St Peter's College. Skye children who attended St Joachim's for primary school tend to attend high school at John Paul College in Frankston.

== Religion ==
=== Christianity ===
Southern Lights Christian Church and Kingdom Hall of Jehovahs Witnesses are located in Skye.

Most of Skye is part of the Catholic Parish of Seaford, while a small section is in the Langwarrin Parish, with the closest Catholic Churches being in Frankston North (Seaford Parish), Langwarrin and Seaford.

Skye is part of the Anglican Parish of Carrum Downs-Frankston North, with the closest Anglican church being in Carrum Downs.

=== Other Religions ===
The closest Sikh temple is in Keysborough, the closest Hindu temple is in Carrum Downs and the closest Buddhist temple is in Springvale

== Location ==
Skye enjoys a large area of land to the east of the suburb which is outside the main growth area and is semi-rural. It forms a green wedge between Skye and Cranbourne West, which is in the neighbouring municipality of the City of Casey. The suburb has a number of newer housing developments (many which have been developed since 2005). A full list of the developments can be seen in the section below.

Skye was ranked in 2015 as the least liveable suburb in Melbourne. Reasons cited for this included sewerage odour, a lack of public transport and a lack of shops. Nearby Sandhurst received a similarly negative ranking.

== Sport ==
The suburb's Australian Rules football team, the Skye Bombers, competes in the Southern Football League.

Golfers play at the Skye Public Golf Course on Ballarto and Taylors Roads, at the course of the Sandhurst Club on Thompsons Road or at Centenary Park Golf Course in neighbouring area, Langwarrin North

== Residential developments and estates ==
Skye has multiple developments and estates, the majority of them being built from 2005 onwards. All of them are listed below.

- Skye Valley
- Lady Emily/Edinburgh Drive
- Darnley Drive
- Rangeview Drive
- Sandhurst (now a separate suburb)
- Wedge Road (under construction)

== Politics ==
Since the state election in November 2014, Skye has been represented by Labor MLA for Carrum, Sonya Kilkenny in Victoria's Legislative Assembly.

Since the Dunkley by-election in March 2025, Skye has been represented by Labor MP for Dunkley, Jodie Belyea in the House of Representatives.

== See also ==
- City of Cranbourne – Skye was previously within this former local government area.
- City of Frankston – Skye is located within this local government area.
- List of people from Frankston – notable people from the City of Frankston (including Skye).
