= Western Port Highway =

Highway in Victoria, Australia

Western Port Highway Victoria
- Coordinates: 38.036288°S 145.247114°E (North end); 38.272091°S 145.189956°E (South end)

General information
- Type: Highway
- Length: 27.5 km (17 mi)
- Gazetted: May 1983 (as Main Road); March 1994 (as State Highway)
- Route number(s): M780 (2000–present) (Lynbrook–Skye); A780 (1997–present) (Skye–Hastings)
- Former route number: A780 (1997–2000) (Lynbrook–Langwarrin); Metro Route 65 (1989–1997) Entire route

Major junctions
- North end: South Gippsland Freeway; Lynbrook, Melbourne
- South Gippsland Highway; Thompsons Road; Hall Road; Cranbourne-Frankston Road; Baxter-Tooradin Road
- South end: Frankston-Flinders Road; Hastings, Victoria

Location(s)
- Major settlements: Dandenong South, Lyndhurst, Skye, Cranbourne West, Langwarrin, Pearcedale, Somerville, Tyabb

Highway system
- Highways in Australia; National Highway • Freeways in Australia; Highways in Victoria

Western Port Highway is a highway in Victoria, Australia, linking the south-eastern fringe of suburban Melbourne to the port of Hastings nearly 30 km to the south on the western coast of Western Port, after which the highway is named.

== Route ==
Western Port Highway commences at Lyndhurst Interchange, where South Gippsland Highway and the alignment of South Gippsland Freeway meet at Lynbrook, and heads south directly from the southern end of South Gippsland Freeway over a bridge crossing South Gippsland Highway as a four-lane, dual-carriageway road, over the Cranbourne railway line, passing through a set of traffic lights at Portlink Drive and Moreton Bay Boulevard, passing through a roundabout at Glasscocks Road, and traffic lights at Thompsons Road. The highway runs onwards further south, meeting Cranbourne-Frankston Road in Cranbourne South, and continues south to North Road, before narrowing to a dual-lane single carriageway road and continuing south to meet with Baxter-Tooradin Road in Pearcedale, before eventually terminating at an intersection with Frankston–Flinders Road, 2 km north of Hastings.

For most of the route the speed limit is 100 kilometres per hour (62 mph), with shorter sections of 90 kilometres per hour (56 mph) and 80 kilometres per hour (50 mph).

== History ==
Western Port Highway was originally a single carriageway road called Lyndhurst Road in the 1960s, renamed some time after. The passing of the Country Roads Act 1958 (itself an evolution from the original Highways and Vehicles Act 1924) provided for the declaration of State Highways and Main Roads, roads partially financed by the state government through the Country Roads Board (later VicRoads). A southern extension to the existing declaration of Dandenong–Hastings Road, subsuming a section of Tyabb–Tooradin Road between Somerville and Hastings, was declared a Main Road on 9 May 1983.

Dandenong-Hasting Road was progressively upgraded to a divided highway between South Gippsland Freeway and Cranbourne–Frankston Road during the 1990s, as dramatically increasing freight traffic volumes to and from Hastings necessitated major upgrades, including eliminating the level crossing with the Cranbourne railway line with an overpass in 2001.

The passing of the Transport Act 1983 updated the definition of State Highways. Western Port Highway was declared a State Highway in March 1994, from South Gippsland Freeway at Lynbrook to Frankston-Flinders Road at Hastings.

The passing of the Road Management Act 2004 granted the responsibility of overall management and development of Victoria's major arterial roads to VicRoads: in 2004, VicRoads re-declared the road as Western Port Highway (Arterial #6230), beginning at South Gippsland Freeway at Lynbrook and ending at Frankston-Flinders Road in Hastings.

Dandenong-Hastings Road was signed Metropolitan Route 65 in 1989. With Victoria's conversion to the newer alphanumeric system in the late 1990s this was replaced by route A780. After further upgrades, this was converted to route M780 between Lynbrook and Cranbourne South in 2000, with a further extension south between Cranbourne South and Langwarrin after further duplication in 2009.

VicRoads had planned to convert the highway to a six- to eight-lane freeway standard between South Gippsland Freeway and about 1.2 km south of Cranbourne-Frankston Road with full grade-separated interchanges at Glasscocks, Thompsons, Hall and Cranbourne–Frankston Roads, and a half-diamond interchange (north-facing ramps only) at Ballarto Road, with a report released in August 2014, however the State Government abandoned any plans for the upgrade, which was estimated to cost $1 billion, in mid-2016.

=== Upgrades ===
- 2001 – Duplication of 4.4 km between South Gippsland Freeway in Lynbrook and Thompsons Road in Lyndhurst, including overpass of Cranbourne railway line, completed January 2001, at a cost of $30.5 million.
- 2009 – Duplication of 3.9 km between Cranbourne-Frankston Road in Cranbourne South and North Road in Langwarrin.

== Major intersections ==
LGA	Location	km	mi	Destinations	Notes
Greater Dandenong–Casey boundary	Dandenong South–Lyndhurst–Lynbrook tripoint	0.0	0.0	South Gippsland Freeway (M780) – Dandenong, Chadstone, City	Northern terminus of highway; route M780 continues north along South Gippsland Freeway
Greater Dandenong–Casey boundary	Dandenong South–Lyndhurst–Lynbrook tripoint	0.0	0.0	South Gippsland Highway (A21) – Dandenong, Cranbourne	Partial cloverleaf interchange
Greater Dandenong–Casey boundary	Lyndhurst–Lynbrook boundary	0.8	0.50	Northey Road – Lynbrook	Southbound entrance and exit only
Greater Dandenong–Casey boundary	Lyndhurst–Lynbrook boundary	0.9	0.56	Monash Drive – Dandenong South	Northbound entrance and exit only
Greater Dandenong–Casey boundary	Lyndhurst	2.1	1.3	Portlink Drive – Dandenong South	Traffic light intersection
Greater Dandenong–Casey boundary	Lyndhurst	2.2	1.4	Moreton Bay Boulevard – Lyndhurst	Traffic light intersection
Greater Dandenong–Casey boundary	Lyndhurst	3.0	1.9	Glasscocks Road – Bangholme, Lyndhurst	Roundabout
Greater Dandenong–Casey–Frankston tripoint	Lyndhurst–Skye–Cranbourne West tripoint	4.7	2.9	Thompsons Road (Metro Route 6) – Carrum, Cranbourne	Traffic light intersection
Casey–Frankston boundary	Skye–Cranbourne West boundary	8.0	5.0	Hall Road (B664) – Carrum Downs, Cranbourne	Traffic light intersection
Casey–Frankston boundary	Skye–Cranbourne West–Cranbourne South tripoint	9.6	6.0	Ballarto Road – Skye, Seaford	Traffic light intersection
Casey–Frankston boundary	Skye–Langwarrin boundary	11.0	6.8	Cranbourne–Frankston Road (Metro Route 4) – Cranbourne, Frankston	Traffic light intersection
Casey–Frankston boundary	Skye–Langwarrin boundary	12.1	7.5	Browns Road – Cranbourne South, Junction Village	Roundabout
Casey–Frankston boundary	Skye–Langwarrin–Pearcedale tripoint	15.0	9.3	North Road – Langwarrin, Devon Meadows	Roundabout; Southern terminus of route M780, northern terminus of route A780
Casey–Frankston boundary	Langwarrin–Langwarrin South–Pearcedale tripoint	16.8	10.4	Robinsons Road – Frankston South, Pearcedale	Roundabout
Casey–Frankston–Mornington Peninsula tripoint	Langwarrin South–Pearcedale boundary	18.5	11.5	Baxter–Tooradin Road (C781) – Baxter, Pearcedale, Tooradin	Roundabout
Mornington Peninsula	Somerville	21.2	13.2	Eramosa Road East – Somerville	
Mornington Peninsula	Somerville	22.9	14.2	Bungower Road – Mornington	Roundabout
Mornington Peninsula	Somerville–Tyabb boundary	24.5	15.2	Tyabb–Tooradin Road (northeast) – Tyabb; O'Neills Road (west) – Tooradin	
Mornington Peninsula	Tyabb	27.5	17.1	Frankston–Flinders Road (C777 north, south) – Hastings, Flinders, Frankston; Denham Road (east) – Hastings	Southern terminus of highway and route A780 at roundabout
1.000 mi = 1.609 km; 1.000 km = 0.621 mi: Incomplete access; Route transition

== See also ==
- Highways in Australia
- List of highways in Victoria
