= Langwarrin =

- Suburb
- Interactive map of Langwarrin
- Coordinates: 38.151°S 145.181°E
- Country: Australia
- State: Victoria
- City: Melbourne
- LGA: City of Frankston
- Location: 42 km (26 mi) from Melbourne; 7 km (4.3 mi) from Frankston

Government
  - State electorate: Hastings
  - Federal division: Dunkley

Area
  - Total: 23.7 km^{2} (9.2 sq mi)

Population
  - Total: 23,588 (2021 census)
  - Density: 995.3/km^{2} (2,578/sq mi)
- Postcode: 3910
Suburbs around Langwarrin
Frankston North	Skye	Cranbourne West
Frankston	Langwarrin	Cranbourne South
Frankston South	Langwarrin South	Pearcedale

Langwarrin (/læŋˈwɒrɪn/ lang-WORR-in) is a suburb in Melbourne, Victoria, Australia, 42 km (26 mi) south-east of Melbourne's central business district, located within the City of Frankston local government area. Langwarrin recorded a population of 23,588 at the 2021 census.

Langwarrin is bounded in the north mostly by Valley Road, in the east by Dandenong-Hastings Road, in the south by Robinsons Road and in the west by the Mornington Peninsula Freeway and by McClelland Drive to the northwest.

== History ==
In 1843, Langwarrin was coined after the Lang Warring pastoral run which ran from the current Langwarrin to the Western Port Coastal Reserve in Tyabb. By the 1880s the entire pastoral run was reduced to the Langwarrin Estate of about 7000 acres. Subsequently, a military reserve named the Langwarrin Military Reserve was built on the area's western edges, being famous for holding prisoners of war in World War I and acting as a military hospital for soldiers with venereal disease. The true purpose of the reserve however, was to defend against an amphibious invasion from the Western Port.

The Stony Point railway was formed in 1889 which went through Langwarrin, reaching all the way to Stony Point and branched to Mornington via Baxter. The station was opposite to the military reserve. Subsequently, Langwarrin opened three post offices.

Langwarrin Primary School, a state school, opened in 1890. In 1928 Cruden Farm was established as a gift to Elizabeth Murdoch, the bride to Keith Murdoch, being a Herald Sun executive. A shopping centre would be built around this time west of Warrandyte Road.

Langwarrin's housing spread from the western edges near the now Karingal Hub Shopping Centre, and moved east from the 1960s onwards. The Langwarrin Military Reserve was closed in 1980 and given to the State Government, now the Langwarrin Flora and Fauna Reserve, establishing itself in 1985. In the same year The Gateway Shopping Centre would be built.

== Geography ==
It has access to the Melbourne CBD via the Western Port Highway, South Gippsland Highway and loosely the Monash Freeway. The Cranbourne-Frankston Road which runs northeast–southwest through Langwarrin is a two-lane-each-direction carriageway.

Until December 1994 Langwarrin was part of the City of Cranbourne (formerly the Shire of Cranbourne until April of the same year). Subsequently, the suburb was moved into City of Frankston as part of statewide reform of local government.

use include earthworks, drainage and foundations and changes in the pattern of vegetation following regrowth after clearing.

== Recreation & economy ==
=== Langwarrin Flora and Fauna Reserve ===
Langwarrin's most prominent landscape feature is its large Flora and Fauna reserve (formerly the Langwarrin Military Reserve). The nature reserve has many walking tracks and is an ideal place for quiet recreation activities such as walking, nature study and photography.

The Langwarrin Military Reserve was established in 1886 at what was then deemed to be a strategic elevated location for the defence of Port Phillip Bay and Melbourne from seaborne attack. Over time it was extended to its present size of 509 acres (2.06 km^{2}).

Prior to World War I, the reserve was used mainly for temporary encampments of volunteer soldiery from throughout Victoria held at Easter or after New Year. These were held here in 1888, 1891, 1894, 1896, 1900, 1901, 1902, 1904 and 1910 as evidenced by the dates the Langwarrin Camp Post Office was open. The Langwarrin railway station was opened in 1888 next to the facility; in the same year a failed attempt was made to sell allotments on a new township of Aldershot adjoining the reserve. On the outbreak of World War 1 the reserve was used for the detention of enemy aliens (predominantly Germans) and from 1915 a military hospital for combatants with venereal disease was established.

After World War II, the reserve was used occasionally for military training, until 1974 when it came under control of the Balcombe Military Camp and was used for training of Army Reserve and school cadet units etc.. In 1980 the reserve was leased to the Victorian Ministry of Conservation and in 1982 the State Government purchased the reserve from the Commonwealth Government.

Today, all the buildings are gone. Remaining evidence of past use include earthworks, drainage and foundations and changes in the pattern of vegetation following regrowth after clearing.

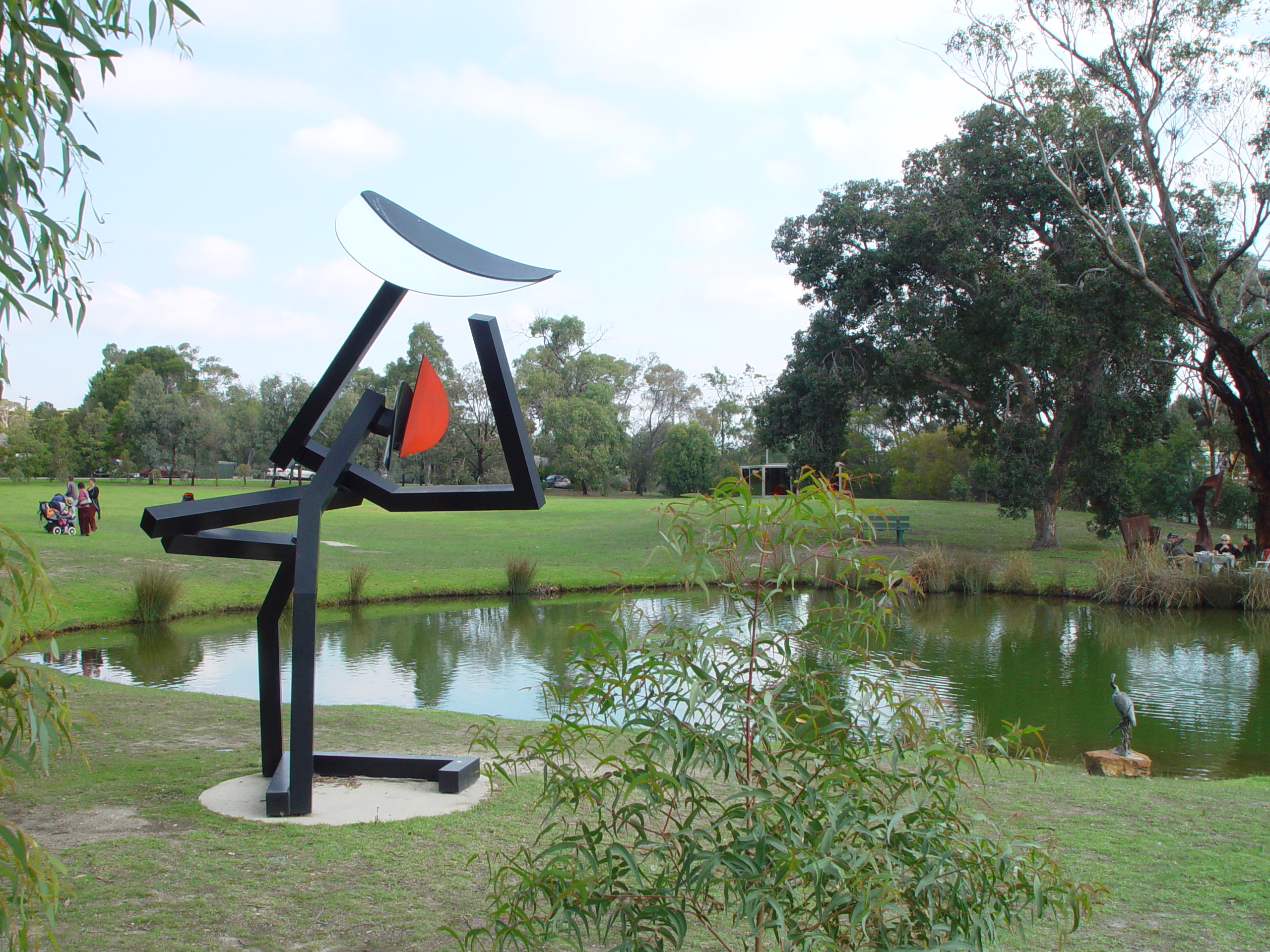
McClelland Gallery + Sculpture Park

=== McClelland Gallery ===
The McClelland Gallery and Sculpture Park is a prominent gallery, set in eight hectares of landscaped bushland, featuring a sculpture park. It was named in honour of renowned Frankston artists, Nan McClelland and Harry McClelland. The McClelland Award is Australia's richest sculpture prize, and is awarded by the gallery biennially (supported by the gallery's patron and Langwarrin resident, the late Dame Elisabeth Murdoch).

=== Sport ===
An Australian rules football club, the Langwarrin Kangaroos, compete in the Mornington Peninsula Nepean Football League as well as being one of Victoria's largest junior football clubs. Langwarrin is also well represented by basketball, tennis, netball, cricket and dancing clubs.

Lloyd Park is a large local sporting venue, that has facilities for netball, tennis and football.

Langwarrin Pony Club and the Peninsula Adult Riders Club provide cross-country, dressage and show jumping facilities for equestrian enthusiasts at the Langwarrin Equestrian & Recreation Reserve.

=== Shopping ===
Langwarrin has two main shopping centres:

- The Gateway Shopping Centre, 230 Cranbourne – Frankston Rd, home to a Coles supermarket and 40 speciality stores. Target Country closed down in the centre during early-mid 2021.
- Langwarrin Plaza Shopping Centre, 385 Cranbourne – Frankston Rd, home to a Woolworths supermarket.

Langwarranites may also use Karingal Hub Shopping Centre simply due to its proximity to the suburb even if it is not a part of Langwarrin itself as well as its expansiveness in comparison to the other malls in the region overall.

There are also a number of small shopping strips, including Long Street, and at the corner of North Road and Warrandyte Road.

== Incidents ==
In December 1999, there was a large fire in the Langwarrin Flora and Fauna Reserve.

On 21 January, 2009, a fire broke out just near Pindara Boulevard. The fire burnt 14 hectares (35 acres).

In January 2018, northern parts of Langwarrin were impacted by the Carrum Downs Bushfire.

== Schools ==
- Woodlands Primary School
- Elisabeth Murdoch College (formerly Langwarrin Post Primary School (1984–1986), Langwarrin Secondary College (1987–2004))
- Langwarrin Park Primary School
- Langwarrin Primary School
- St. Jude's Primary School
- Bayside Christian College

== Notable residents ==
- Dame Elisabeth Murdoch, Australian socialite and philanthropist
- Nevil Shute, English-born novelist
- Sir Daryl Lindsay, Australian artist (resided at the now heritage-listed Mulberry Hill)
- Lady Joan Lindsay, Australian author (also resided Mulberry Hill)
- Michael Paynter, Australian musician
- Luke Parker (Australian footballer), Australian Rules footballer
- Jarred Moore, Australian Rules footballer and coach
- Bailey Wright, Australian football player

== See also ==
- City of Cranbourne – Langwarrin was previously within this former local government area.
- City of Frankston – Langwarrin is located within this local government area.
- Langwarrin railway station
