= Thompson Road =

Thompson Road may refer to:

- New York State Route 635
- Thompson Road, Melbourne, Australia
