= Electoral district of Carrum =

State electoral district of Victoria, Australia

Carrum Victoria—Legislative Assembly
- Interactive map of electoral district boundaries from the 2022 state election
- State: Victoria
- Created: 1976
- MP: Sonya Kilkenny
- Party: Labor
- Namesake: Suburb of Carrum
- Electors: 51,265 (2022)
- Area: 87 km^{2} (33.6 sq mi)
- Demographic: Outer metropolitan and semi-rural
Electorates around Carrum:
Mordialloc	Dandenong	Narre Warren South
Port Phillip	Carrum	Cranbourne
Frankston	Hastings	Cranbourne

The electoral district of Carrum is an electoral district of the Victorian Legislative Assembly. It lies in the south eastern suburbs of Melbourne, covering Bangholme, Bonbeach, Carrum, Carrum Downs, Lyndhurst, Patterson Lakes, Sandhurst, Seaford and Skye.

The seat was created in 1976 and traditionally has had a working class character and has been safe for the Labor Party. However, since the 1990s the area has been gentrifying and the seat was won by the Liberal Party against the trend at the 1996 election. However, the seat was narrowly recovered by Labor due to the Anti-Kennett swing in 1999 and the 'Brackslide' of 2002 reverted the seat to its original safe Labor status.

The 2013 redistribution significantly reshaped the seat, with the seat losing Aspendale, Edithvale and parts of Chelsea to the seat of Mordialloc and gaining Carrum Downs and Sandhurst from the seat of Cranbourne.

In the 2014 Victorian state election, Labor MP Sonya Kilkenny defeated the Liberal incumbent to regain the seat.

The 2021 redistribution resulted in small changes for the electorate's boundaries, losing the area of Seaford south of Seaford Road to the Frankston district, while gaining the remaining area of Lyndhurst (east of the Western Port Highway) from the Cranbourne district.

== Members for Carrum ==
Member	Party	Term
Ian Cathie	Labor	1976–1988
Mal Sandon	Labor	1988–1996
David Lean	Liberal	1996–1999
Jenny Lindell	Labor	1999–2010
Donna Bauer	Liberal	2010–2014
Sonya Kilkenny	Labor	2014–present

== Election results ==
2022 Victorian state election: Carrum
Party	Candidate	Votes	%	±%
Labor	Sonya Kilkenny	21,586	49.9	−3.1
Liberal	Bec Buchanan	13,141	30.3	−2.3
Greens	Jayde Lillico	3,282	7.6	+2.1
Freedom	Georgia Erevnidis	1,750	4.0	+4.0
Family First	Jeremy Cameron	1,354	3.1	+3.1
Animal Justice	Taylor Macgregor Owen	1,201	2.8	+2.8
Independent	Damian Willis	986	2.3	+2.3
Total formal votes		43,294	95.2	+1.1
Informal votes		2,183	4.8	−1.1
Turnout		45,477	88.7	−1.7
Two-party-preferred result
Labor	Sonya Kilkenny	25,871	59.8	−2.2
Liberal	Bec Buchanan	17,423	40.2	+2.2
Labor hold		Swing	−2.2	

=== Graphical summary ===
Two-party-preferred vote results in Carrum View source data.
