= Nepean Highway =

Highway in Victoria, Australia

Nepean Highway St Kilda Road, Brighton Road, Point Nepean Road Victoria
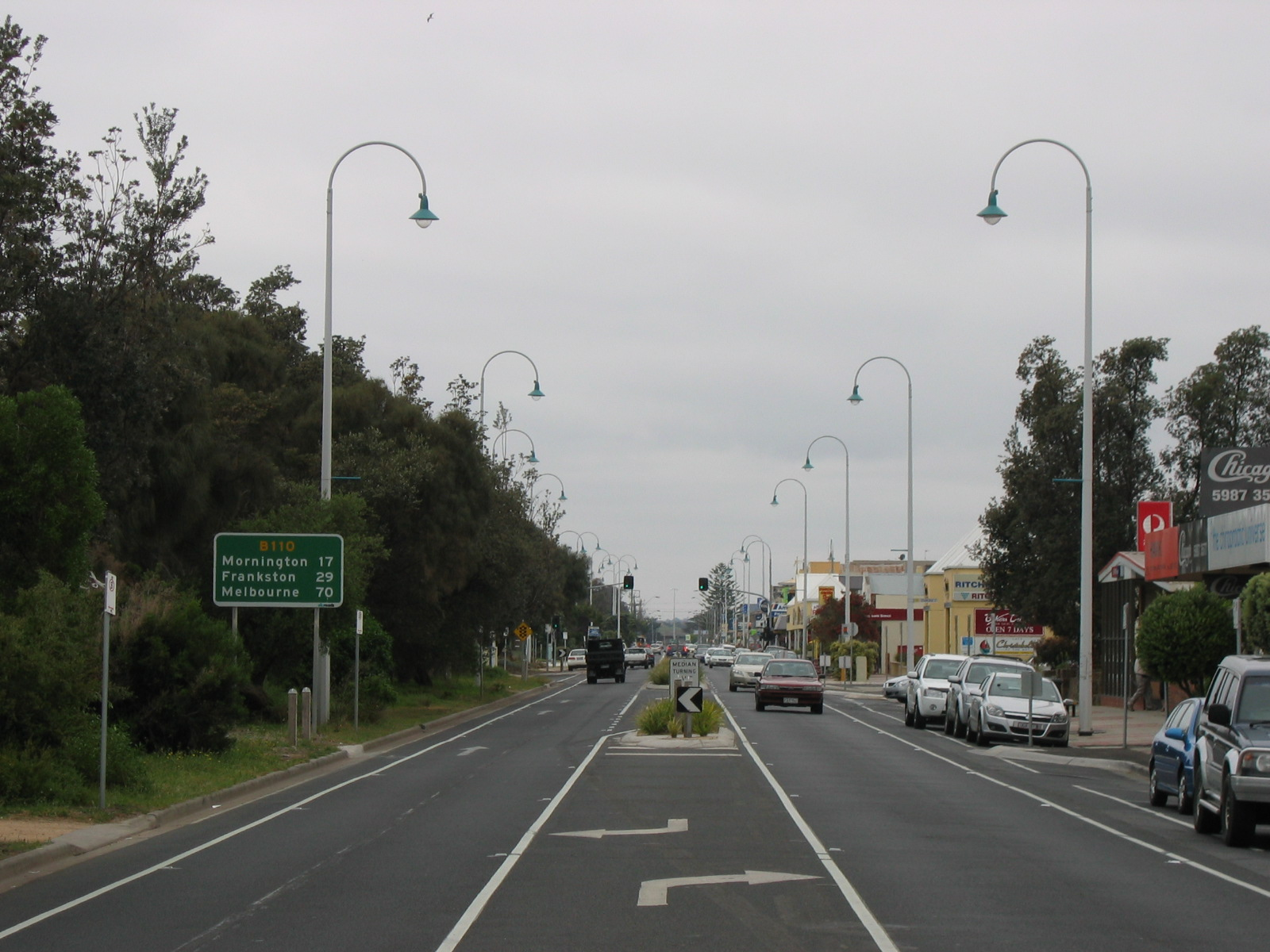
- Point Nepean Road in Dromana
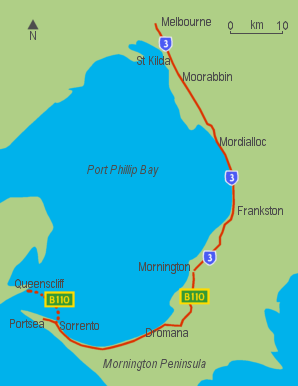
- Route of Nepean Highway between Melbourne and Portsea

General information
- Type: Highway
- Length: 90.6 km (56 mi)
- Gazetted: December 1913 (as Main Road); 1947/8 (as State Highway)
- Route number(s): Metro Route 3 (1965–present) (St Kilda–Mornington); B110 (1998–present) (Mornington–Sorrento); Concurrencies: Metro Route 25 (1965–present) (through Elsternwick); Metro Route 19 (1965–present) (through Brighton East); Metro Route 10 (1965–present) (through Mentone); C787 (1998–present) (Tuerong–Dromana); C788 (1998–present) (Dromana–Safety Beach)
- Former route number: Metro Route 3 (1965–1998) (Mornington–Point Nepean)

Major junctions
- North end: St Kilda Road; St Kilda, Melbourne
- Punt Road; Queens Road; North Road; South Road; Warrigal Road; Beach Road; McLeod Road; Mornington-Tyabb Road; Mornington Peninsula Freeway; Marine Drive; McCulloch Street; Boneo Road; Esplanade
- South end: Point Nepean National Park; Portsea, Victoria

Location(s)
- Major settlements: Elsternwick, Moorabbin, Cheltenham, Mordialloc, Chelsea, Carrum, Seaford, Frankston, Mount Eliza, Mornington, Dromana, Rosebud, Sorrento

Highway system
- Highways in Australia; National Highway • Freeways in Australia; Highways in Victoria

Nepean Highway is a major highway in Victoria, running south from St Kilda Junction in inner-southern Melbourne to Portsea, tracing close to the eastern shore of Port Phillip for the majority of its length. It is the primary road route from central Melbourne through Melbourne's southern suburbs. This name covers a few consecutive roads and is not widely known to most drivers except for its central section, as the entire allocation is still best known by the names of its constituent parts: St Kilda Road, Brighton Road and Nepean Highway proper, and Point Nepean Road. This article will deal with the entire length of the corridor for the sake of completion.

== Route ==
=== St Kilda Junction to Mornington ===
Historically starting at the Melbourne CBD at Princes Bridge as St Kilda Road and heading south through the Melbourne Arts Precinct, today Nepean Highway is declared to commence at St Kilda Junction as St Kilda Road and heads in a southerly direction until it reaches the intersection with Carlisle Street (prior to the widening in the late 1960s this section was formerly known as High Street), where it changes name to Brighton Road and heads in a south-easterly direction until it reaches the intersection with Glen Huntly Road in Elsternwick, where it changes name again to become Nepean Highway proper. Tram route 67 runs down the middle of the highway until it turns into Glen Huntly Road. In 1984 conversion of the seven kilometre section between Cochrane Street, Elsternwick and South Road, Moorabbin to a dual carriageway was completed. At Glen Huntly Road, the speed limit increases to 80 km/h and the road widens to become an eight-lane dual carriageway. It is reduced to six lanes at Moorabbin, passing through Cheltenham and Mentone, and then to the 60 km/h or 70 km/h four-lane single carriageway after the roundabouts at Mordialloc. The highway then travels virtually along the foreshore of Port Phillip Bay to Frankston, with several stretches of dual carriageway, and then up Olivers Hill, from which there are good views across Frankston and the bay.

=== Mornington Peninsula ===
In the late 1960s a bypass road was constructed in the suburb of Mount Eliza. Previously the highway travelled through the main shopping village: this section is now known as Mount Eliza Way.

After passing through Mount Martha, the highway runs parallel to the Mornington Peninsula Freeway, before turning toward the town of Dromana. Here the highway changes name again, to become Point Nepean Road, its former name in the early years of settlement. From here, Arthurs Seat is accessible, which gives views across the bay, and on a clear day, the skyscrapers of Melbourne are visible. Anthonys Nose is a point, or escarpment located on the southern shore of Port Phillip Bay, between Dromana and McCrae. The highway passes between "The Nose" and the shores of the bay. It was named by Charles La Trobe in 1839. In the 1920s "The Nose" was modified in order to combat the daily tides that blocked the highway.

Route B110 leaves the highway at Sorrento to cross the bay to Queenscliff, via the ferry where it continues to Geelong, via Bellarine Highway, but the highway continues as a two lane road down to the seaside resort of Portsea. The end of the highway is the very nondescript painted turning circle, before the gates of the former Commonwealth quarantine and defence station of Point Nepean, a humble ending to Melbourne's main southern highway.

== History ==
Originally known as Arthurs Seat Road, it was built in the 1850s to provide a road (originally a crude sandy track) from the farms (owned by Jude Roberts) south of Melbourne and link the city with its southern bay settlements and sea defences at Point Nepean.

The passing of the Country Roads Act 1912 through the Parliament of Victoria provided for the establishment of the Country Roads Board (later VicRoads) and their ability to declare Main Roads, taking responsibility for the management, construction and care of the state's major roads from local municipalities. Point Nepean Road was declared a Main Road on 1 December 1913, from Moorabbin through Mordialloc and Frankston to Mount Martha, and Dromana-Sorrento Road was declared a Main Road, from Dromana to Rye on 24 January 1916, and from Rye to Sorrento on 13 June 1923.

The passing of the Highways and Vehicles Act 1924 provided for the declaration of State Highways, roads two-thirds financed by the state government through the Country Roads Board. Nepean Highway was declared a State Highway in the 1947/48 financial year, from Glenhuntly Road in Elsternwick via Frankston to Portsea (for a total of 55 miles), subsuming the original declarations of Point Nepean Road and Dromana-Sorrento Roads as Main Roads. It was named after Point Nepean, itself named after the British politician and Colonial Administrator, Sir Evan Nepean, 1st Baronet PC.

The passing of the Transport Act 1983 updated the provision for the declaration of State Highways through VicRoads. The portion of Nepean Highway between Marine Drive in Dromana and the end of the road in Portsea was renamed back to Point Nepean Road and declared a Tourist Toad in May 1991; however the road was still known (and signposted) as Nepean Highway.

The passing of the Road Management Act 2004 granted the responsibility of overall management and development of Victoria's major arterial roads to VicRoads: in 2004, VicRoads re-declared the road as Nepean Highway (Arterial #6660), beginning at St Kilda Road at St Kilda (this declaration formally includes today's St Kilda Road from St Kilda Junction and Brighton Road, but signposts along this section have kept its original name) and ending at Mornington-Flinders Road (sign-posted as Nepean Highway) in Dromana (better known as the Mount Martha interchange with Mornington Peninsula Freeway), and the renaming of Nepean Highway as Point Nepean Road (Arterial #4034) between Mornington-Dromana Road (known as Marine Drive) between Dromana and the end of the road in Portsea. The remnant between the intersection with Marine Parade and the Mount Martha interchange with the Mornington Peninsula Freeway have been declared as Bittern-Dromana Road (Arterial #5754) between Marine Parade and Bittern-Dromana Road proper, and Mornington-Flinders Road (Arterial #5751) between Mornington-Flinders Road proper and the Mount Martha interchange; these sections are still sign-posted as Nepean Highway.

Nepean Highway was signed as Metropolitan Route 3 between Melbourne and Portsea in 1965; with Victoria's conversion to the newer alphanumeric system in the late 1990s, the southern half of the highway from Mornington to Sorrento was replaced by route B110, which continues on the other side of the bay at Queenscliff to run along Bellarine Highway until Geelong.

Between the 1950s and about 1980, the road was progressively upgraded to a divided highway between the City and Mordialloc. From Mordialloc to Frankston, the highway is an undivided four lane road. The widening of the Mordialloc Bridge, the last section of less than four lanes, was completed in early 2009.

=== Possible future north–south connection ===
Transurban, in their Response to the Eddington Report, July 2008, believe a north–south corridor from the Hume Freeway and Metropolitan Ring Road to the Nepean Highway south of Glen Huntly Road, Elsternwick, generally via the Hoddle Highway corridor, deserves attention.

This alignment would follow the original F2 Freeway corridor as proposed in the 1969 Melbourne Transportation Plan.

== Major intersections and towns ==
LGA	Location	km	mi	Destinations	Notes
Port Phillip	St Kilda	0.0	0.0	St Kilda Road (Metro Route 3) – City	Northern terminus of Nepean Highway (declared); Metro Route 3 continues northwest along St Kilda Road
Port Phillip	St Kilda	0.0	0.0	Punt Road (Metro Route 29 north) – South Yarra, Clifton Hill, Epping	
Port Phillip	St Kilda	0.0	0.0	Queens Way (Alt National Route 1) – Caulfield, Oakleigh, Dandenong	Eastbound entrance only
Port Phillip	St Kilda	0.1	0.062	Fitzroy Street – St Kilda, to Queens Road westbound – Melbourne CBD	
Port Phillip	St Kilda	0.2	0.12	Barkly Street (Metro Route 29 south) – St Kilda, Elwood	
Port Phillip	St Kilda	1.4	0.87	Carlisle Street – St Kilda, Caulfield North	Southern end of St Kilda Road, northern end of Brighton Road
Port Phillip	Ripponlea–Elwood boundary	2.5	1.6	Glen Eira Road (Metro Route 22) – Caulfield, Oakleigh, Ferntree Gully	
Port Phillip–Glen Eira boundary	Ripponlea–Elsternwick–Elwood–Brighton quadripoint	3.3	2.1	Hotham Street (Metro Route 25 north) – Prahran	Northern terminus of concurrency with Metro Route 25
Port Phillip–Glen Eira boundary	Ripponlea–Elsternwick–Elwood–Brighton quadripoint	3.4	2.1	Glen Huntly Road – Elwood, Glenhuntly	Southern end of Brighton Road, northern end of Nepean Highway (sign-posted)
Glen Eira–Bayside boundary	Brighton–Elsternwick boundary	3.7	2.3	Rusden Street (Metro Route 25 south), to New Street – Hampton	Southern terminus of concurrency with Metro Route 25
Glen Eira–Bayside boundary	Gardenvale–Brighton East–Brighton tripoint	5.4	3.4	North Road (Metro Route 18) – Brighton, Clayton, Rowville	
Bayside	Brighton East	7.3	4.5	Hawthorn Road (Metro Route 19) – Malvern, Hawthorn	Northern terminus of concurrency with Metro Route 19
Bayside	Brighton East	7.5	4.7	Centre Road (Metro Route 16 east) – Brighton, Bentleigh, Springvale	
Glen Eira–Bayside boundary	Bentleigh–Brighton East boundary	8.8	5.5	Cummins Road (Metro Route 19) – Black Rock	Southern terminus of concurrency with Metro Route 19
Glen Eira–Bayside boundary	Bentleigh–Moorabbin–Hampton East–Brighton East quadripoint	9.9	6.2	South Road (Metro Route 14) – Brighton, Moorabbin	
Kingston	Highett–Cheltenham boundary	13.0	8.1	Bay Road (west) – Sandringham, Westfield Southland; Karen Street (east) – Highett, Westfield Southland	
Kingston	Cheltenham	13.7	8.5	Chesterville Road (north) – Bentleigh East, Westfield Southland; Charman Road (south) – Cheltenham	
Kingston	Cheltenham	14.1	8.8	Centre Dandenong Road (east) – Dingley Village, Moorabbin Airport; Park Road (west) – Cheltenham	
Kingston	Mentone	16.1	10.0	Balcombe Road (Metro Route 10 west) – Black Rock	Northern terminus of concurrency with Metro Route 10
Kingston	Mentone	16.2	10.1	Warrigal Road (Metro Route 15) – Parkdale, Oakleigh, Surrey Hills	
Kingston	Mentone	16.5	10.3	Lower Dandenong Road (Metro Route 10 east) – Dandenong	Southern terminus of concurrency with Metro Route 10
Kingston	Mordialloc	19.7	12.2	Beach Road (Metro Route 33) – Black Rock, Brighton, Port Melbourne	
Kingston	Edithvale	23.5	14.6	Edithvale Road (Metro Route 40) – Springvale, Glen Waverley, Donvale	
Kingston	Chelsea	25.0	15.5	Thames Promenade – Chelsea Heights	
Kingston	Carrum	27.9	17.3	McLeod Road (Metro Route 6) – Patterson Lakes, Cranbourne North, Clyde North	
Frankston	Seaford	31.7	19.7	Seaford Road – Seaford	
Frankston	Frankston	34.9	21.7	Fletcher Road (Metro Route 9) – Carrum Downs, Dandenong	
Frankston	Frankston	35.7	22.2	Davey Street (Metro Route 4/Tourist Route 12) – Cranbourne, Hastings	
Mornington Peninsula	Mornington	47.8	29.7	Mornington-Tyabb Road (C782) – Mornington, Tyabb	Southern terminus of Metro Route 3, northern terminus of route B110
Mornington Peninsula	Mount Martha–Tuerong boundary	56.3	35.0	Mornington Peninsula Freeway (M11) – Portsea, City	Northern terminus of concurrency with route C787
Mornington Peninsula	Dromana	60.5	37.6	White Hill Road (C787/C788) – Red Hill, Flinders, Bittern	Moats Corner intersection Southern terminus of concurrency with route C787, northern terminus of concurrency with route C788
Mornington Peninsula	Dromana–Safety Beach boundary	62.3	38.7	Mornington Peninsula Freeway (M11) – Portsea, City	
Mornington Peninsula	Dromana–Safety Beach boundary	63.5	39.5	Marine Drive (C783) – Mount Martha, Mornington	Southern terminus of concurrency with route C788; Southern terminus of Nepean Highway; Northern terminus of Point Nepean Road
Mornington Peninsula	Dromana	64.9	40.3	McCulloch Street (C789), to Arthurs Seat Road – Arthurs Seat, Red Hill	
Mornington Peninsula	Rosebud	71.8	44.6	Boneo Road (C777) – Flinders, Cape Schanck	
Mornington Peninsula	Capel Sound	73.4	45.6	Elizabeth Avenue (C776), to Eastbourne Road – Rosebud	
Mornington Peninsula	Sorrento	86.0	53.4	Esplanade (B110) – Sorrento	Route B110 continues north along Esplanade, then via Queenscliff–Sorrento Ferry to Bellarine Highway, Queenscliff
Mornington Peninsula	Portsea	90.6	56.3	Point Nepean National Park	Southern terminus of Point Nepean Road
1.000 mi = 1.609 km; 1.000 km = 0.621 mi: Concurrency terminus; Incomplete access; Route transition

== Gallery ==
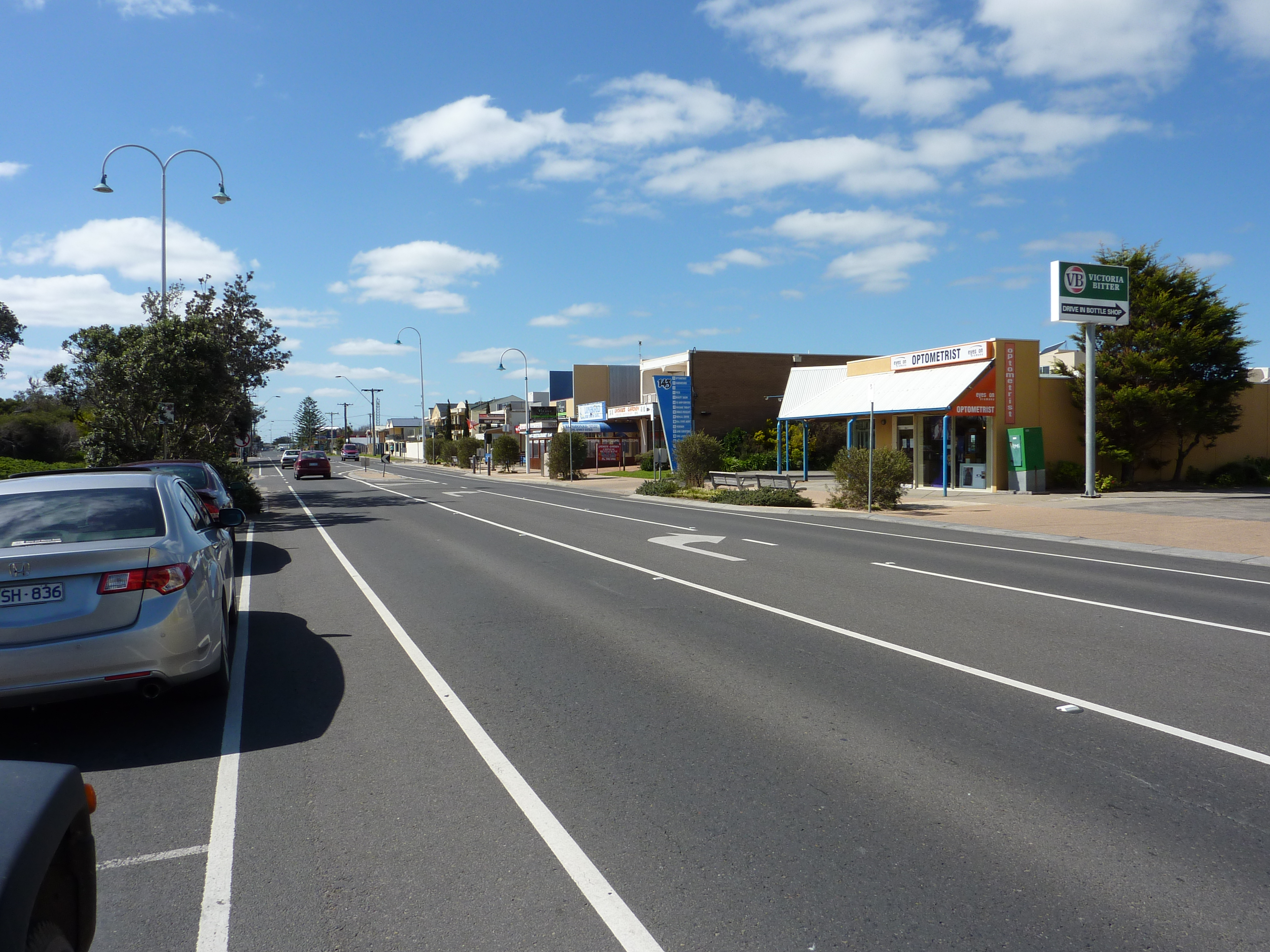
Nepean Highway in Dromana

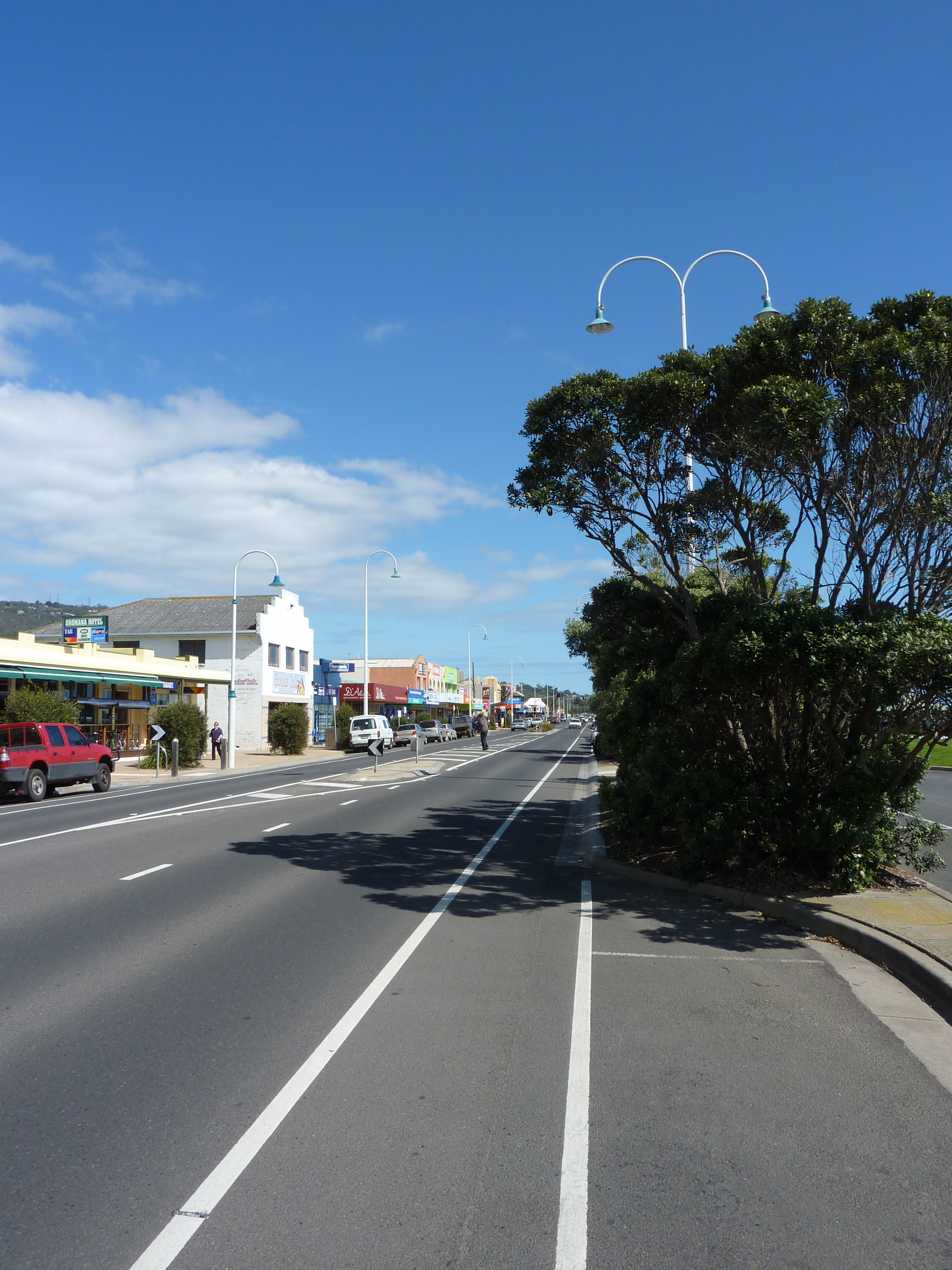
Nepean Highway in Dromana
