= South Gippsland Highway =

Highway in Victoria, Australia

South Gippsland Highway Victoria
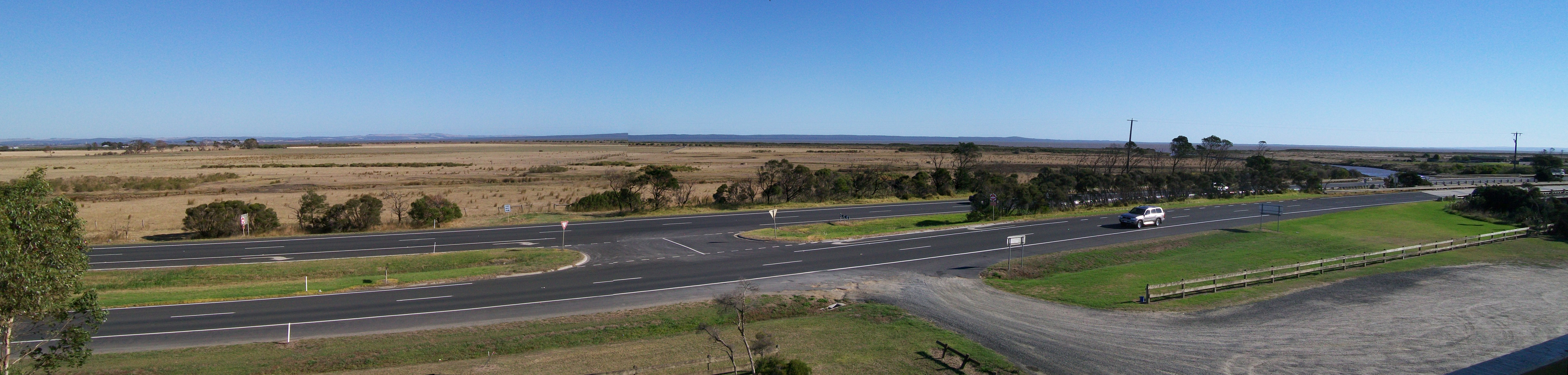

- Coordinates: 38.000718°S 145.227005°E (West end); 38.111406°S 147.068393°E (East end)

General information
- Type: Highway
- Length: 256 km (159 mi)
- Gazetted: November 1913 (as Main Road); 1933 (as State Highway)
- Route number(s): A21 (2024–present) (Northern section: Dandenong–Cranbourne North) (Southern section: Cranbourne–Koo Wee Rup); B21 (2024–present) (Cranbourne North–Cranbourne); M420 (1998–present) (Koo Wee Rup–Lang Lang); A440 (2003–present) (Lang Lang–Sale); Concurrencies: Metro Route 12 (1989–present) (through Dandenong South)
- Former route number: M420 (1998–2024) (Lynbrook–Koo Wee Rup); B440 (1998–2003) (Lang Lang–Sale); State Route 180 (1985–1998) Entire route

Major junctions
- West end: Princes Highway; Dandenong South, Melbourne
- South Gippsland Freeway; Western Port Highway; Bass Highway; Strzelecki Highway; Hyland Highway
- East end: Princes Highway; Sale, Victoria

Location(s)
- Major settlements: Cranbourne, Koo Wee Rup, Lang Lang, Korumburra, Leongatha, Foster, Yarram, Longford

Highway system
- Highways in Australia; National Highway • Freeways in Australia; Highways in Victoria

South Gippsland Highway is a partially divided highway connecting the south-eastern suburbs of Melbourne through the South Gippsland region of in Victoria, Australia to the town of Sale. The highway serves as a gateway from Melbourne to many attractions including Wilsons Promontory and Phillip Island as well as being an important road for farmers in Gippsland.

== Route ==
South Gippsland Highway commences at the intersection with Princes Highway in Dandenong, and heads in a south-eastly direction as a four-lane, dual-carriageway road towards the northern shores of Western Port Bay, through Cranbourne and Tooradin, until it reaches the interchange with Bass Highway to Phillip Island outside Lang Lang, after which it is entirely an undivided rural highway. It continues in an southeasterly direction through Nyora, Korumburra, Leongatha, Foster, Welshpool and Yarram, before heading north and eventually terminating at a roundabout with Princes Highway at Sale.

== History ==
The passing of the Country Roads Act 1912 through the Parliament of Victoria provided for the establishment of the Country Roads Board (later VicRoads) and their ability to declare Main Roads, taking responsibility for the management, construction and care of the state's major roads from local municipalities. (Main) South Gippsland Road was declared a Main Road, from Korumburra to Leongatha, on 10 November 1913; (Main) Coast Road was declared a Main Road, from Dandenong to Lang Lang, on 1 December 1913; and Sale-Yarram Road was declared a Main Road, from Sale via Longford to Stradbroke on 23 March 1914, and Stradbroke via Woodside to Yarram on 6 August 1919; and Foster-Yarram Road was declared a Main Road from Foster via Welshpool to Yarram on 29 July 1919.

The passing of the Highways and Vehicles Act 1924 provided for the declaration of State Highways, roads two-thirds financed by the state government through the Country Roads Board. South Gippsland Highway was declared a State Highway in 1933, cobbled together from roads between Dandenong and Nyora, and between Sale and Yarram (for a total of 83 miles), subsuming the original declarations of (Main) Coast Road, (Main) South Gippsland Road and Sale-Yarram Roads as Main Roads. In 1939, another section from Foster to Yarram was added, subsuming the original declaration of Foster-Yarram Road as a Main Road. In the 1947/48 financial year, another section between Nyora via Korumburra and Leongatha to Meeniyan was added, along the former Loch-Nyora Road, Bena-Korumburra Road and Korumburra-Leongatha Roads. In the 1965/66 financial year, the last section between Meeniyan and Foster was added, completing its present-day alignment at this stage.

Conversion to dual carriageways at the western end began in 1975, initially between South Gippsland Freeway and Cranbourne; a distance of 17 km. The final link in the duplication of the highway between Dandenong and Bass Highway opened in the early 1990s between Princes Highway and Pound Road.

South Gippsland Highway was signed as State Route 180 between Dandenong and Sale on 13 December 1985, the first road in Victoria signed with a State Route, and later a concurrency with Metropolitan Route 12 between Greens Road and Pound Road through Dandenong South; with Victoria's conversion to the newer alphanumeric system in the late 1990s, this was replaced by route M420 between Lynbrook and Lang Lang, B440 between Lang Lang and Sale (which was upgraded to A440 when highway upgrades along South Gippsland Highway raised the quality of the road in 2003), and unallocated (excluding the short stretch of Metro Route 12) between Dandenong and Dandenong South. The western section of the South Gippsland Highway between the intersection of the Koo Wee Rup Bypass and the Princes Highway is gradually being renumbered to A21 and B21 following the completion of major works on Koo Wee Rup Road in 2024. The upgrade has included the rerouting of M420 to the upgraded route.

The passing of the Road Management Act 2004 through the Parliament of Victoria granted the responsibility of overall management and development of Victoria's major arterial roads to VicRoads: VicRoads re-declared the road in 2004 as South Gippsland Highway (Arterial #6580), from Dandenong South to Sale.

=== Timeline of upgrades and duplication ===
- 1961 – Whitelaw By-pass Road: 2.5 miles just north of Korumburra completed as a 2-lane, single-carriageway road, replacing a narrow winding route 3.5 miles long consisting of portions of Bena-Korumburra and Warragul-Korumburra Roads, eliminating two railway crossings, costing A£65,000.
- 1975 – Conversion to dual carriageways at the western end began in 1975, between the South Gippsland Freeway and Cranbourne; a distance of 17 km.
- 1987 – Duplication works completed on three sections. Cranbourne to Five Ways, Tooradin to Dalmore Road, and Monomeith Road to Bass Highway.
- 1989 – 3 km of dual carriageways opened between Manks Road and Lynes Road, Tooradin in December 1989.
- 1990 – 3 km of dual carriageways opened between Lynes Road, Tooradin and Dore Road in April 1990. At this stage, ’27 km of the planned 32 km length of duplication between Cranbourne and Bass Highway has now been completed’.
- 1990/1991 – Duplication of 6 km south of Tooradin completed at a cost of $A9.9m. No exact date was given, however VicRoads Annual Reports cover the previous financial year. This completed the duplication of the highway between Cranbourne and the Bass Highway. An interesting anomaly is that the kilometre lengths quoted in this annual report and the previous annual report do not match!
- 1991/1992 – 2.8 km duplication opened between Princes Highway and Pound Road. This was the final link in the duplication of the highway from the Princes Highway to Bass Highway, Again, no exact date was given, however VicRoads Annual Reports cover the previous financial year.

=== Level crossing elimination ===
The Gippsland railway line crossing just south of the intersection with Princes Highway in Dandenong South was removed in 3 August 2021. The contract was awarded in March 2020, with construction starting in October 2020 on a new road bridge over the rail line on an alignment just east of the original level crossing to a new intersection with Princes Highway; construction was completed and the new alignment was opened to traffic in 3 August 2021.

== Major intersections and towns ==
LGA	Location	km	mi	Destinations	Notes
Greater Dandenong	Dandenong South	0.0	0.0	Princes Highway (Alt. National Route 1) – Dandenong, Melbourne, Berwick, Warragul	Western terminus of highway and route A21 (northern section)
Greater Dandenong	Dandenong South	0.1	0.062	Gippsland railway line	
Greater Dandenong	Dandenong South	0.5	0.31	Dandenong Bypass – Keysborough, Moorabbin	
Greater Dandenong	Dandenong South	1.8	1.1	Greens Road (Metro Route 12) – Mordialloc, Keysborough	Concurrency with Metro Route 12
Greater Dandenong	Dandenong South	3.3	2.1	Pound Road (Metro Route 12 east) – Hampton Park, Narre Warren; Pound Road West (C652 west) – Dandenong South	Concurrency with Metro Route 12
Greater Dandenong	Dandenong South–Lynbrook–Hampton Park tripoint	4.5	2.8	South Gippsland Freeway (M780 north) – Chadstone, City; Western Port Highway (M780 south) – Hastings, Flinders	Partial cloverleaf interchange
Casey	Lynbrook	7.3	4.5	Hallam Road (B675 north) – Hampton Park, Hallam; Evans Road (B675 south) – Lyndhurst, Cranbourne West	
Casey	Cranbourne North–Cranbourne boundary	10.2	6.3	Thompsons Road (Metro Route 6) – Carrum, Berwick	Eastern terminus of route A21 (northern section), western terminus of route B21
Casey	Cranbourne	13.8	8.6	Sladen Street (Metro Route 4 west, C407 east) – Frankston, Berwick	
Casey	Cranbourne–Cranbourne East boundary	14.8	9.2	Narre Warren Road (A404) – Narre Warren, Belgrave, Lilydale	Eastern terminus of route B21, western terminus of route A21 (southern section)
Casey	Devon Meadows–Clyde boundary	20.1	12.5	Clyde–Five Ways Road (C778 north) – Clyde, Berwick; Fisheries Road (south) – Cannons Creek, Pearcedale	
Casey	Tooradin–Devon Meadows–Blind Bight tripoint	24.7	15.3	Baxter-Tooradin Road (C781) – Baxter, Pearcedale	Roundabout
Casey	Tooradin	31.4	19.5	Dalmore Road – Cardinia	
Cardinia	Koo Wee Rup	36.4	22.6	Rossiter Road (M420/C421) – Koo Wee Rup, Longwarry, to Koo Wee Rup Bypass (M420) – Pakenham	Roundabout; Route M420 continues north, eastern terminus of route A21 (southern section)
Cardinia	Koo Wee Rup	38.9	24.2	Sybella Avenue (C419) – Koo Wee Rup	
Cardinia	Lang Lang	45.9	28.5	McDonalds Track (C429) – Lang Lang, Nyora	
Cardinia	Lang Lang	47.5	29.5	Westernport Road (C431) – Lang Lang, Drouin	Roundabout
Cardinia	Lang Lang	49.7	30.9	Bass Highway (M420) – Wonthaggi, Phillip Island	Southbound entrance to and northbound exit from Bass Highway only Route M420 continues south, western terminus of route A440
South Gippsland	Loch, Nyora	60.9	37.8	Lang Lang–Nyora Road (C434) – Nyora, Poowong	
South Gippsland	Loch	68.7	42.7	Victoria Road – Loch, to Loch-Wonthaggi Road – Almurta, Wonthaggi; Loch-Poowong Road – Poowong	
South Gippsland	Loch	69.7	43.3	Former South Gippsland railway line	
South Gippsland	Bena	77.0	47.8	Former South Gippsland railway line	
South Gippsland	Korumburra	81.5	50.6	Warragul–Korumburra Road (C425) – Poowong, Warragul	
South Gippsland	Korumburra	82.0	51.0	Korrumburra-Wonthaggi Road (C437) – Wonthaggi, Inverloch	
South Gippsland	Leongatha	96.3	59.8	Strzelecki Highway (B460 northeast) – Mirboo North, Morwell; Bass Highway (B460 southwest) – Inverloch, Wonthaggi, Phillip Island	
South Gippsland	Leongatha	96.9	60.2	Ogilvy Street (C454) – Dumbalk	
South Gippsland	Meeniyan	110.0	68.4	Tarwin Lower (C443) – Venus Bay	
South Gippsland	Meeniyan	113.3	70.4	Farmers Road (C455) – Dumbalk, Mirboo North	
South Gippsland	Meeniyan	114.0	70.8	Meeniyan–Promontory Road (C444) – Fish Creek, Wilsons Promontory	
South Gippsland	Foster	134.3	83.5	Fish Creek–Foster Road (C445) – Fish Creek, Wilsons Promontory	
South Gippsland	Agnes	152.4	94.7	Barry Road (C447) – Agnes	
South Gippsland	Welshpool	156.1	97.0	Port Welshpool Road (C451 south) – Port Welshpool; Woorarra Road (north) – Boolarra	
Wellington	Alberton	177.8	110.5	Yarram–Port Albert Road (C452) – Port Albert	
Wellington	Yarram	185.2	115.1	Tarra Valley Road (C484) – Tarra Valley	
Wellington	Yarram	187.5	116.5	Hyland Highway (C482) – Traralgon	
Wellington	Woodside	203.5	126.4	Carrajung–Woodside Road (C453) – Carrajung, Traralgon	Northern concurrency with route C453
Bruthen Creek		203.7	126.6	Bridge name unknown	
Wellington	Woodside	203.9	126.7	Woodside Beach Road (C453) – Woodside Beach, to McLoughlins Road (C459) – McLoughlins Beach	Southern concurrency with route C453
Wellington	Longford	248.4	154.3	Seaspray Road (C496) – Seaspray, to Garretts Road (C497) – Dutson	
Wellington	Longford	249.7	155.2	Longford–Loch Sport Road (C485) – Golden Beach, Loch Sport	Concurrency with route C485
Wellington	Longford	250.1	155.4	Rosedale–Longford Road (C485) – Rosedale	Concurrency with route C485
Wellington	Sale	255.8	158.9	Princes Highway – Traralgon, Bairnsdale, Orbost	Eastern terminus of highway and route A440 at roundabout
1.000 mi = 1.609 km; 1.000 km = 0.621 mi: Concurrency terminus; Incomplete access; Route transition

== See also ==
- Highways in Australia
- Highways in Victoria
