= Agnes, Victoria =

Agnes Victoria
- Coordinates: 38°40′S 146°24′E
- Population: 61 (2021 census)
- Postcode(s): 3962
- Location: 190 km (118 mi) Se of Melbourne; 55 km (34 mi) SE of Leongatha; 10 km (6 mi) NW of Port Welshpool
- LGA(s): South Gippsland Shire
- State electorate(s): Gippsland South
- Federal division(s): Monash

Agnes is a locality in Victoria, Australia. It is located at the junction of the South Gippsland Highway and Barry Road, close to Corner Inlet.

The railway arrived in 1892 and the Post Office opened on 28 December 1915 and closed in 1960.

== See also ==
Agnes railway station
