= Koo Wee Rup Bypass =

Road in Melbourne, Victoria

Koo Wee Rup Bypass Victoria
- Coordinates: 38.183737°S 145.479087°E (North end); 38.208308°S 145.472596°E (South end)

General information
- Type: Road
- Length: 2.9 km (1.8 mi)
- Opened: 2015
- Route number(s): M420 (2024–present)
- Former route number: C422 (2015–2024)

Major junctions
- North end: Koo Wee Rup Road; Koo Wee Rup, Victoria
- South end: Rossiter Road; Koo Wee Rup, Victoria

Location(s)
- LGA(s): Cardinia Shire

Koo Wee Rup Bypass is a short road in Victoria, Australia, linking Healesville-Koo Wee Rup Road more directly to South Gippsland Highway at Koo Wee Rup, subsequently bypassing Koo Wee Rup.

== Route ==
Koo Wee Rup Bypass begins at the intersection with Healesville-Koo Wee Rup Road and Manks Road in northern Koo Wee Rup and runs south as a dual-lane, single-carriageway road to the west of the town, over the Bunyip River drains, to terminate at Rossiter Road shortly afterwards; the intersection with South Gippsland Highway is 500 metres away. It acts to remove through traffic, particularly heavy vehicles, from the town centre.

== History ==
In August 2013, Lend Lease Engineering (formerly Abigroup) was awarded the contract to construct the bypass, including a new 280-metre (920 ft) bridge spanning the Bunyip River drains. Construction finished in May 2015, six months ahead of schedule, for a cost of $66 million. It was opened to traffic on 15 May 2015.

The bypass is the first stage of a major upgrade of Healesville-Koo Wee Rup Road, ultimately to convert it to freeway standard between South Gippsland Highway south of Koo Wee Rup and Princes Freeway south of Pakenham. The next stage is the eventual duplication of the bypass, its linking to the South Gippsland Highway, and then the conversion of the road to Pakenham; more planning is required before any further progress is to be made.

In 2024, the second stage of the alignment upgrade opened, with Koo Wee Rup Road being upgraded to a dual carriageway highway between the Princes Freeway in Pakenham and the Koo Wee Rup Bypass in Koo Wee Rup. Further planning and funding are required for subsequent stages and ultimately freeway standardisation of the route as per the original 2010 plan

== Major intersections ==
Koo Wee Rup Bypass is entirely contained within the Shire of Cardinia local government area.

Location	km	mi	Destinations	Notes
Koo Wee Rup	0	0.0	Koo Wee Rup Road (M420 north/C419 east) – Koo Wee Rup, Pakenham, Melbourne	Northern terminus of bypass Route M420 continues north along Koo Wee Rup Road
Koo Wee Rup	0	0.0	Manks Road (west) – Clyde	
Koo Wee Rup	2.9	1.8	Rossiter Road (M420 southwest/C421) – Tooradin, Koo Wee Rup, Longwarry	Southern terminus of bypass Route M420 continues southwest along Rossiter Road
1.000 mi = 1.609 km; 1.000 km = 0.621 mi: Route transition
