= Lynbrook, Victoria =

Suburb of Melbourne, Victoria, Australia

Lynbrook
- Suburb
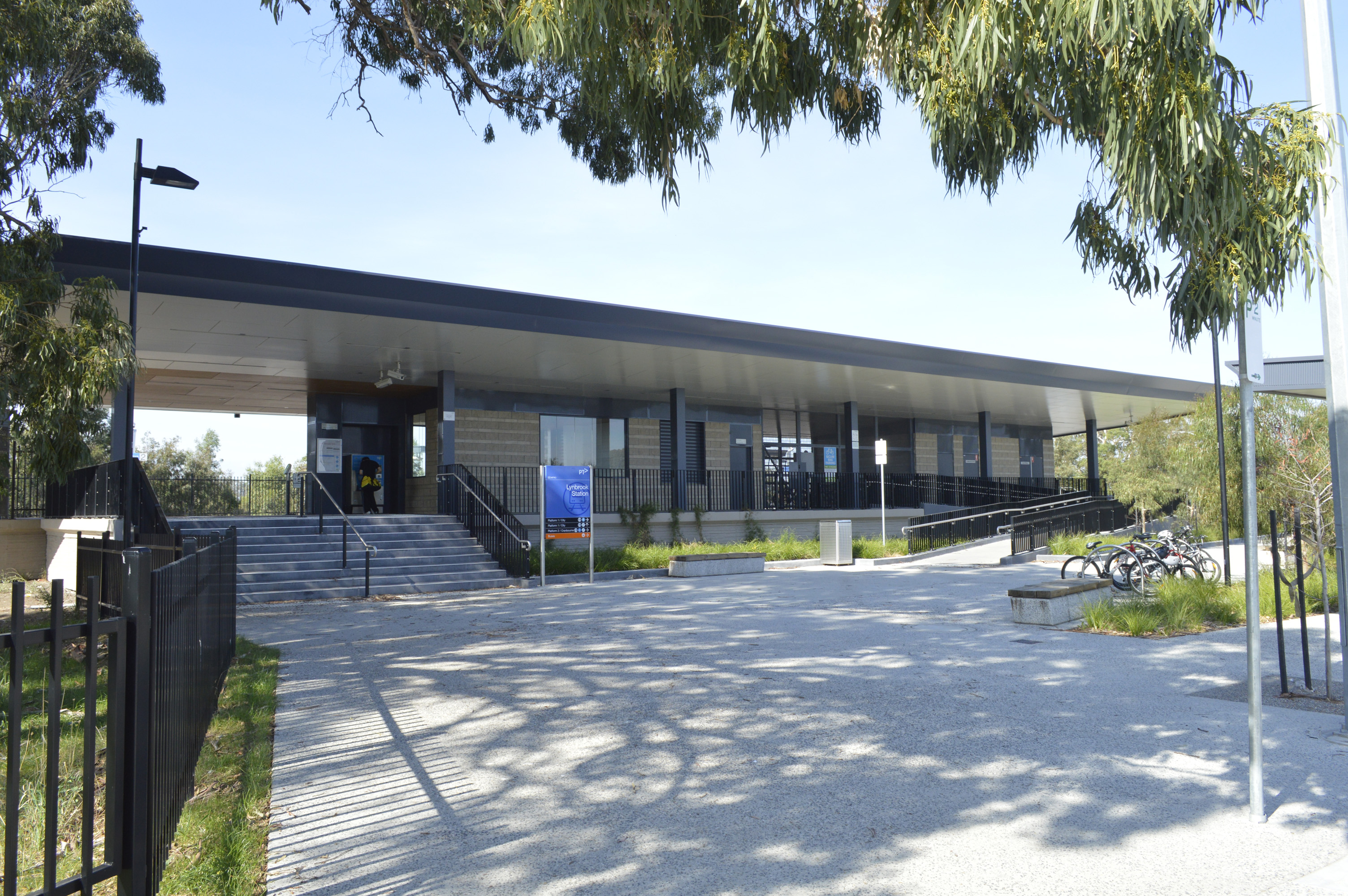
- Lynbrook railway station

- Interactive map of Lynbrook
- Coordinates: 38.05°S 145.252°E
- Country: Australia
- State: Victoria
- City: Melbourne
- LGA: City of Casey
- Location: 36 km (22 mi) from Melbourne; 9 km (5.6 mi) from Dandenong
- Established: 1994

Government
  - State electorate: Narre Warren South
  - Federal division: Holt

Population
  - Total: 9,121 (2021 census)
- Postcode: 3975
- Mean max temp: 19.6 °C (67.3 °F)
- Mean min temp: 9.0 °C (48.2 °F)
- Annual rainfall: 762.2 mm (30.01 in)
Suburbs around Lynbrook
	Hampton Park
Lyndhurst	Lynbrook	Cranbourne North
Skye	Cranbourne West	Cranbourne

Lynbrook is a suburb in Melbourne, Victoria, Australia, 36 km south-east of Melbourne's central business district, located within the City of Casey local government area. Lynbrook recorded a population of 9,121 at the 2021 census.

Lynbrook is positioned on the South Gippsland Highway, slightly north-west of Cranbourne, and just south of the residential suburb of Hampton Park. Lynbrook is bounded by the Western Port Highway in the west, the South Gippsland Freeway in the north, by a line north of Merinda Park railway station in the east, and the railway line in the south.

The suburb was developed by VicUrban, starting in 1994. A special feature of the VicUrban development is the stormwater catchment which flows into the lake and wetlands where it is purified before being released into Dandenong Creek and into Port Phillip Bay.

Prior to 1994, the area now occupied by Lynbrook was part of Lyndhurst.

There are two primary schools, one State and one Catholic. There is a central shopping centre with Coles and a range of strip shops with take away food and eateries, a gym, medical centre, pharmacy, news agency, butcher, bakery, and hair and beauty. There is also a Community Centre, child care centres, vet, kindergarten and maternal child health nurse.

Lynbrook has a local residents' group, the Lynbrook Residents Association (LRA), who advocate to Local, State and Federal Government on behalf of residents with local issues. They also host community events.

== History ==
In 1999, the Urban Land Corporation released land in the first stage of what was then called Lynbrook Heights. These blocks are located on the opposite side of the South Gippsland Highway to the sales office and the first few stages of the Lynbrook development. Lynbrook Heights offered larger blocks (greater than 650 square metres) than earlier land releases, as well as city views from the hill. The development included a recreational area called Tower Hill. The Lynbrook Heights section is a triangular section of land wedged between the South Gippsland Highway and Hallam Road, but is part of Lynbrook Suburb.

Lynbrook Primary School opened in January 2005 with an initial enrolment of 175 students, and 937 students in 2013. A Catholic primary school, St Francis de Sales Primary School, opened in 2010 on the corner of Aylmer Rd and Henning Ave.

A maternal and child health centre was constructed by Casey Council and opened in early 2006. This centre also includes a pre-school kindergarten for the growing number of children in the area.

Banjo Paterson Park, a large recreation reserve, has many paths for walking and cycling, a barbecue area, a large children's playground, open spaces and a football / cricket oval. The oval was home to the "Lynbrook Lakers" cricket team which fields a number of adult and children's cricket teams in the local Dandenong District Cricket Association (DDCA) league, where the 1st XI has won the premiership for the last 3 years straight (2006/07, 2007/08, 2008/09). A new oval has been constructed, complete with clubroom facilities, which the club will be using from the commencement of the 2009/10 season at Marriot Waters in nearby Lyndhurst.

On 22 April 2012, the Lynbrook railway station opened on the Cranbourne line. It is located north of Aylmer Road.

On 30 May 2015, the Lynbrook Community Centre opened which is located on the corner of Lynbrook Boulevard and Harris Street. This is a multipurpose community facility which abuts the local shopping centre.

The Lyndhurst Football and Netball Club was established in 2009 by Andrew King, formerly known as the Lynbrook Football Club, based at Lynbrook Primary School.

== Education ==
The region is served by Lynbrook Primary School, St Francis de Sales Primary School, and Lyndhurst Primary School.

== Transport ==
Lynbrook railway station was opened in April 2012, providing rail services to the suburb on the Cranbourne line. Two bus routes contain stops within Lynbrook:

- Route 891: Lynbrook railway station to Westfield Fountain Gate, with a stop near the Lynbrook Village shopping centre
- Route 893: Cranbourne Park Shopping Centre to Dandenong railway station, also with a stop near Lynbrook Village.

== See also ==
- City of Cranbourne – Lynbrook was previously within this former local government area.
