= Carrum Downs Secondary College =

Location
- 263 McCormicks Road; Carrum Downs, Victoria; Australia; 38°05′41″S 145°11′51″E

Information
- Type: Government-funded secondary school
- Motto: Achieving Excellence
- Established: 2004
- Principal: Chad Ambrose
- Years: 7–12
- Enrolment: 926.9 (FTE, 2025)
- Colours: Dark Sax, Sax Blue, Crystal Blue, Black, White and Gold
- Website: www.cdsc.vic.edu.au

Carrum Downs Secondary College is a government secondary school located in the suburb of Carrum Downs, Victoria, Australia.

== History ==
Carrum Downs Secondary College was established in 2004. Since its establishment the college has expanded its facilities and curriculum offerings to accommodate growing enrolment and program development.

== Enrolment and demographics ==
The college's enrolment has grown in recent years. The school's 2024 Annual Report records 901 students (420 female, 481 male). Victorian government data list 926.9 full-time equivalent students for 2025. Approximately 13% of students have English as an additional language and 3% identify as Indigenous. The school's socio-educational index is described as "Medium", and parent satisfaction (72.9%) exceeds the state average.

== Leadership and administration ==
As of 2025, the principal is Chad Ambrose. Assistant principals are Michael Melfi (Learning & Teaching), Janette Kalatzis (Engagement) and Vanessa Coco (Wellbeing & Inclusion). The Business Manager is Julie Westwood. The school lists house leaders (ANZAC, Flynn, Gilmour and Hollows) and learning-area leaders on its leadership and staffing pages.

== Curriculum and programs ==
The college delivers the Victorian Curriculum across six learning areas: English, Mathematics, Science, Humanities, Health and Physical Education (HPE), and Arts and Technology. A weekly "Connect" program focuses on student wellbeing and respectful relationships.

Updated course guides for Years 8–12 were published for 2026.

=== STEAM and STEM emphasis ===
The college has prioritised STEM learning and opened a STEAM (Science-Technology-Engineering-Arts-Mathematics) centre to support interdisciplinary, inquiry-based projects. The facility was supported by Victorian government capital funding.

=== Enrichment: Aspire Enhancement Program ===
From 2026 the college expanded its enrichment offerings with the Aspire Enhancement Program, which provides specialist electives and extracurricular pathways in sport, performing arts and academic extension. The program includes sport-specific coaching (for example, an Aspire Volleyball Program), music ensembles, and a Scholars Program for high-achieving students.

== Extracurricular activities and partnerships ==
The college offers a broad extracurricular program including basketball, volleyball, mountain biking and traditional athletics. Carrum Downs teams have competed at state and national levels; for example, Year 8 and Year 11 boys volleyball teams finished runners-up at the 2024 National Volleyball Championships in Queensland.

Student leadership opportunities include College Captains and House Captains.

=== International partnerships ===
The college maintains a sister-school relationship with Hirakata High School in Hirakata, Osaka, Japan; students participate in exchange activities as part of language and cultural programs.

The college also works with local feeder primary schools to support transition into Year 7, and participates in government wellbeing initiatives such as the "Doctors in Secondary Schools" program.

== Academic results and recognition ==
In 2025 NAPLAN results showed Year 9 students performing above the Victorian state average in Reading, Writing and Numeracy; Year 7 results were recorded as among the school's strongest on record, and the school reported strong progression between Year 7 and Year 9. College publications also note continued improvement in senior secondary (VCE) outcomes.

== Facilities and campus ==
Major campus improvements in recent years include:

- a new STEAM Centre (opened 2023–24) providing laboratories and makerspaces for technology and science projects;
- a competition-grade gymnasium (completed 2019);
- Café263, a staff-run on-site cafe; and
- performing arts and sports facilities supporting school productions and carnivals.

The STEAM project was funded through state capital grants and local contributions.

== See also ==
- Carrum Downs, Victoria
