= Carrum Downs =

Carrum Downs Karrum Karrum (Boonwurrung)
- Suburb
- Interactive map of Carrum Downs
- Coordinates: 38.096°S 145.178°E
- Country: Australia
- State: Victoria
- City: Melbourne
- LGA: City of Frankston
- Location: 48 km (30 mi) from Melbourne; 9 km (5.6 mi) from Frankston; 8.7 km (5.4 mi) from Cranbourne

Government
  - State electorate: Carrum
  - Federal division: Dunkley

Area
  - Total: 19.5 km^{2} (7.5 sq mi)

Population
  - Total: 21,976 (2021 census)
  - Density: 1,127.0/km^{2} (2,919/sq mi)
- Postcode: 3201
Suburbs around Carrum Downs
Patterson Lakes	Bangholme	Sandhurst
Seaford	Carrum Downs	Skye
Seaford	Frankston North	Langwarrin

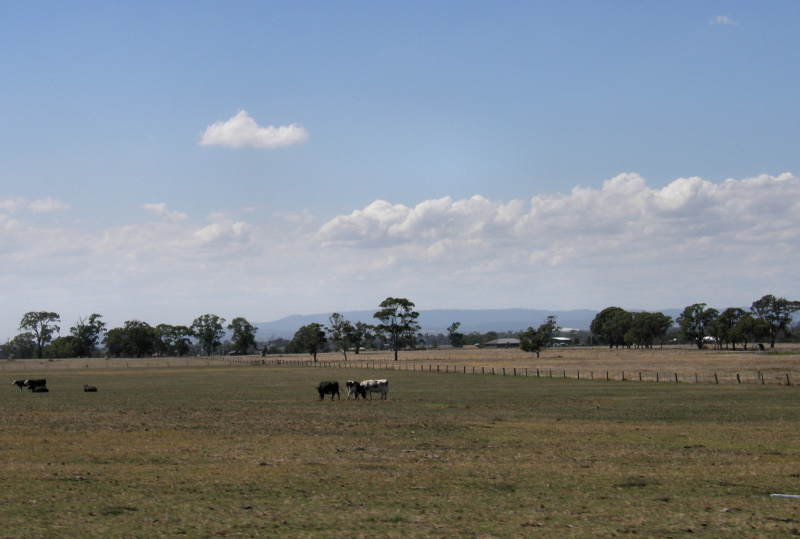
Views of the Dandenong Ranges from Carrum Downs.

Carrum Downs is a suburb in Melbourne, Victoria, Australia, 48 km south-east of Melbourne's central business district via the Monash Freeway, located within the City of Frankston local government area. Carrum Downs recorded a population of 21,976 at the 2021 census.

Prior to December 1994 the majority of Carrum Downs was within the City of Cranbourne. However, following statewide local government reform, the suburb was moved to be part of a larger City of Frankston.

== History ==
=== Karrum Karrum ===
Before European settlement in the Port Phillip region, Indigenous Australians resting after the steep climb of Oliver's Hill in Frankston would have looked north across the bay to see a long ribbon of sandy beach shaped vaguely like a boomerang. The area was known as Karrum Karrum – or, as interpreted by some early squatters, Garem Gam – meaning "Boomerang". The swampy marshland behind the sand dunes was a rich hunting ground teeming with wildlife.

=== Carrum Swamp ===
The Carrum Swamp measured approximately 15 km from north to south, and averaged about 5 km across from east to west. It was up to 8 km wide at the northern end. The high lands visible in the swamp were the Isles of Wannarkladdin, now Chelsea Heights. The swampland with its dense growth of swamp tea-tree and other vegetation was covered for the most part by the waters from the Dandenong, Eumemmerring, and other smaller creeks, with a total catchment area of approximately 430 km^{2}, with the present townships of Langwarrin, Cranbourne, Berwick, Belgrave, Ferntree Gully, Olinda, Lilydale, Croydon and Ringwood forming its perimeter. Some of the waters eventually flowed through marshy country to the Mordialloc Creek or through to the Kananook Creek which flowed into the bay at Frankston.

The Carrum Swamp together with the larger Koo-Wee-Rup Swamp made a formidable barrier against the early explorers and land seekers in the early days.

=== The birth of Carrum – allotments on the Long Beach ===
The first survey of the Carrum swamp was made by T. E. Rawlinson, and completed by 2 January 1866. The only sign of European habitation reported by Rawlinson was a fisherman's cottage occupied by John Watkins and his family near the present Watkins Grove, Aspendale. The survey between the swamp and the sea resulted in Mr Callinan, the State's assistant surveyor, dividing the area into 18 allotments stretching from the Mordialloc Creek to the present Keast Park, Seaford. The land was referred to as the "Allotments on the Long Beach", the first sales taking place at Semmell McCaul & Co's Auction Rooms at Collins Street, Melbourne, on 22 December 1865. The upset price was $6 per acre. Most of the land sold went to investors, but some development did take place near the already established fishing village of Mordialloc. Carrum Downs Post Office finally opened on 1 November 1909.

The land sold on the swamp side was bought by Hugh Brown who built his home "Pine Vale" near the site of the Mordialloc High School which was part of his property. He was 40 years a Councillor of the Shire of Dandenong and served as President of the Shire. He was famous for his "Carrum" potatoes which were sent to several States. When Hugh Brown started farming there were still wild cattle roaming the swamplands from the original squatting days of the later 1830s to the 1850s.

=== The first settlement ===
During the Great Depression, the Brotherhood of St Laurence built a settlement at Carrum Downs to provide food and shelter to suffering families. After World War II, the suburb was gradually redeveloped as a Village for aged persons.

=== Botany Park and the redevelopment of Botany Bush ===
A small section of Carrum Downs is sometimes referred to by locals as "Botany Park", based on the name of a housing estate built during the late 1970s and early 1980s. In the first major development of its type in the area, land was subdivided into generous lots between the southern and northern perimeters of Ballarto and Hall Roads. The generous land allotments, affordability and proximity to Frankston attracted families to the suburb. Development was conducted by AVJennings, which financed and built prominent signage reading 'Botany Park' on the corner of Ballarto Road and Lyrebird Drive. The signage remains, although weather degradation and graffiti have degraded its appearance. During the early 1990s, the South Western quarter between Ballarto and Frankston-Dandenong Roads was known as 'Botany Bush'. The area was redeveloped into housing during the late 1990s.

== Carrum Downs Bushfire ==
On 6 January 2018 a 15-year-old girl intentionally lit a fire in Carrum Downs' Pines Flora and Fauna Reserve that destroyed the bushland and put homes in Carrum Downs, Skye, Frankston North and Langwarrin at risk.

== Architecture ==
The suburb is a mixture of modern low scale dwellings with generous garden frontage and low scale fencing. During the 1990s, a large catchment of land remained as public park space, although this has subsequently been developed into housing. Housing construction continues in the suburb.

== Retail areas ==
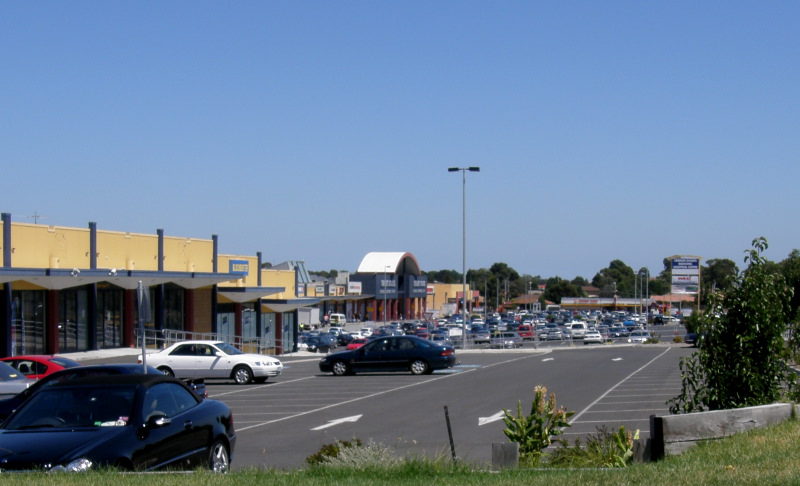
The Carrum Downs Regional Shopping Centre

Carrum Downs is serviced by three shopping precincts, with a fourth bordering the suburb in neighbouring Seaford. The Carrum Downs Regional Shopping Centre is located on Hall Road in the centre of the suburb and is home to Bendigo Bank, a Woolworths supermarket, Kmart, a post office, a pharmacy, newsagency plus approximately 30 other shops including liquor shops, clothing stores, fast food outlets, restaurants and real estate agents.

The Local Village @ Carrum Downs is located on the Dandenong-Frankston Road and comprises approximately 12 shops including an IGA supermarket, restaurant, bakery, fast food shops, doctor's office and pharmacy. Directly opposite the precinct is another small retail/business park.

Carrum Downs Plaza, which opened in 2008, is located on the corner of McCormicks Road and Ballarto Road in the south of the suburb and includes 22 specialty shops as well as a Coles supermarket. There are doctor and dental practices, a pharmacy, take away, 2 liquor stores and a popular cafe.

== Schools ==
- There are four preschools in Carrum Downs at Botany Park, Bowerbird, Rowellyn and Banyan Fields, as well as three- and four-year-old kindergarten at Flinders Christian Community College (a non-denominational Christian school).
- Primary school education is provided at Banyan Fields Primary School (previously Carrum Downs Primary), Rowellyn Park Primary, Skye, St Joachim's primary (a Catholic school) and Flinders Christian Community College.
- Secondary education is provided at Carrum Downs Secondary College and Flinders Christian Community College.
- Tertiary level training can be undertaken at the Monash University Peninsula campus, Institute of TAFE in nearby Frankston.

== Health services ==
Carrum Downs is serviced by three medical centres, two dental clinics, three pharmacies and a physiotherapy clinic. Hospital facilities are provided at nearby Frankston, about 10 minutes away.

The first large-scale General Practice medical service, the Carrum Downs Medical Centre, opened operations in Hall Rd in 1989. The medical centre moved into a substantial new 1000 m^{2} facility in December 2014. The site on which the medical centre operates is newly named the Carrum Downs Health Precinct, and comprises pathology and radiology services, retail pharmacy, dental services, a multi- disciplinary allied health service incorporating physiotherapy and a retail gymnasium, and a primary care skin cancer medical service in addition to the preexisting large general medical practice.

== Transportation ==
- Rail: Carrum Downs has no direct access to rail services. The closest rail links are the Kananook and Seaford stations on the Frankston line, both approximately 12 minutes (by car) from the centre of Carrum Downs, or the Merinda Park and Cranbourne stations on the Cranbourne line, both approximately 16 minutes away.
- Bus: Carrum Downs is serviced by 3 local bus routes – 760, 833 and 832 – and one SmartBus service – 901 – which runs approximately once every 15 minutes Monday to Friday from Melbourne Airport to Frankston, passing through Carrum Downs via Dandenong-Frankston road.
- Road: Carrum Downs provides easy access to two major arterial roads. To the East of Carrum Downs, the Western Port Highway provides connectivity to Melbourne City in the north (via the South Gippsland Freeway and the Monash Freeway). In a southerly direction, the Western Port Highway leads to the Port of Hastings. To the West of Carrum Downs is the Nepean Highway, which runs south from Melbourne city to Portsea on the Mornington Peninsula, along the eastern shores of Port Phillip Bay. Also to the west is the Frankston Freeway, which travels from Chelsea Heights in the north to the Mornington Peninsula in the south. Carrum Downs is also close to the Eastlink Tollway, which opened on 29 June 2008. This runs from Rutherford Road in Carrum Downs (with travel further south provided by the Frankston Freeway) to Donvale in Melbourne's north east. Eastlink connects with the Monash Freeway and should reduce travelling time and distance to the City of Melbourne. Development of EastLink has led to strong commercial and industrial growth in Carrum Downs alongside the route of the EastLink. Peninsula Link provides a freeway from the Eastlink/Frankston Freeway interchange, through Carrum Downs and then south to link with the Mornington Peninsula Freeway at Mount Martha. Since opening, Peninsula link has shortened travel times from Carrum Downs to Safety Beach on the Peninsula by about 20 minutes.

== Community services ==
- The Lyrebird Community Centre is located in Carrum Downs. The Carrum Downs Community Centre was established in 1988 and was located in the GK Tucker Village as part of the Brotherhood of St Laurence. The centre consisted of two small cottages: one for child minding activities and the other housing the Centre Manager. In 1994, the Centre amalgamated to become the Lyrebird Community Centre and moved to its current location in Lyrebird Drive. During 2003, the centre was renovated into a large modern complex.
- Carrum Downs offers Library Services via the Carrum Downs Library.
- A local branch of The Salvation Army operates within Carrum Downs.
- The 1st Carrum Downs Scout Group are based at the Recreation Reserve and run Cub Scouts, Joey Scouts, Scouts and Venturers.
- A Hindu temple is located on Boundary Road. It is the largest in Victoria.
- A Catholic church is located in nearby Seaford and serves the Carrum Downs area.

== Parks and Reserves ==
The Rotary Park at Carrum Downs

Carrum Downs has access to five public parks:

- Banyan Reserve, which includes a sports oval and a children's playground.
- Rotary Park, which includes barbecue facilities and a children's playground.
- Sandfield Reserve, which includes a children's playground, and skate park facilities.
- Carrum Downs Reserve, on Wedge Road, includes playground, barbecue facilities, two large sports ovals, cricket nets, and tennis courts. This is the home ground of the Skye Football Club
- Carrum Woods Reserve, on Carrum Woods Drive, includes wooded areas and large grassy areas, basketball hoop, and small playground.
- The Pines Flora and Fauna Reserve, on Ballarto Road, is a forest reserve operated by Parks Victoria. During the 2017–18 Australian Bushfire Season a teenage girl started a bushfire in this reserve.

In addition, there are several other wooded reserve areas which the public are allowed to walk through, and many of the housing developments feature public grassed areas and children's play facilities.

== Sport and fitness ==
Tennis courts at the Recreation Reserve

- Association football (soccer): Skye United Soccer Club plays at neighbouring Skye at the Recreation Reserve.
- Australian rules football: The Skye Bombers play their home games at the Recreation Reserve on Wedge Road.
  - Auskick (A modified version for 5- to 12-year-olds): The Rowellyn Park/Carrum Downs Auskick team plays its games at the Carrum Downs Reserve along Wedge Road.
- Angling: The Sands Angling Club have their headquarters at the Recreation Reserve.
- Baseball: The Carrum Downs Baseball Club has junior and senior teams and plays its games at the Botany Park Reserve on Lyrebird Drive.
- Clay target shooting: The Frankston Clay Target Shooting Club is located on Rossiter Road in Carrum Downs, as are the Victorian Field & Game Association and Oz Shooting (a commercial club operated by Commonwealth Games multi-gold medalist and Olympic bronze medalist trap shooter Adam Vella).
- Cricket: The Carrum Downs Cricket Club is based at the Recreation Reserve on Wedge Road.
- Gymnasium: There are two fitness centres in Carrum Downs, located on Frankston-Dandenong Road and a ladies-only fitness centre located on Hall Road.
- Paintball: Paintball Carrum Downs is located on Highview Road and features a 50-acre (200,000 m^{2}) playing field.
- Tennis: Facilities are available at the Carrum Downs Tennis Club at the Recreation Reserve on Wedge Road. There are four acrylic hardcourts which replaced the two synthetic grass courts and two asphalt courts in 2006.

== Shri Shiva Vishnu Temple ==
The Shri Shiva Vishnu Temple at Carrum Downs

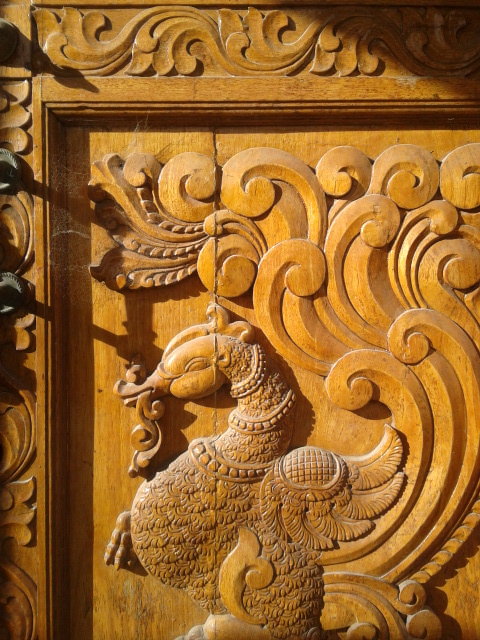
Carving on the doors of Shiva Vishnu Temple

The Shri Shiva Vishnu Hindu Temple is located in this suburb. This temple is the largest Hindu temple in Victoria. Worship at the temple is centred around Lord Shiva and Lord Vishnu, the presiding deities of two dominant streams in the Hindu ritualistic tradition. The temple attempts to bring the two streams together and provide a synthesis. Many Hindus residing in Melbourne worship there and is most popularly known for holding the annual Hindu festivals of Holi and Diwali.

== In popular culture ==
In 2013, Carrum Downs made headlines as the location of the viral video "Just waiting for a mate". The video was filmed in the carpark of the local Coles Supermarket, and was first shown in 2008 on the Australian reality TV show Highway Patrol.

== State politics ==
Since the state election on 29 November 2014, the suburb of Carrum Downs has been represented by Labor MP Sonya Kilkenny in Victoria's Legislative Assembly. Carrum Downs falls within the Electoral district of Carrum.

Members for Carrum:

Member	Party	Term
Ian Cathie	Labor	1976–1988
Mal Sandon	Labor	1988–1996
David Lean	Liberal	1996–1999
Jenny Lindell	Labor	1999–2010
Donna Bauer	Liberal	2010–2014
Sonya Kilkenny	Labor	2014–present

== See also ==
- City of Cranbourne – Parts of Carrum Downs were previously within this former local government area.
- City of Frankston
- City of Springvale – Parts of Carrum Downs were previously within this former local government area.
- List of people from Frankston – notable people from the City of Frankston (including Carrum Downs)
