= City of Frankston =

Coordinates: 38°08′S 145°10′E

- Local government area
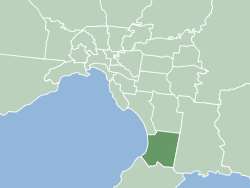

- Interactive map of City of Frankston
- Country: Australia
- State: Victoria
- Region: Greater Melbourne
- Established: 1994; 1860 (original)
- Council seat: Frankston

Government
  - Mayor: Sue Baker
  - State electorates: Carrum; Frankston; Hastings
  - Federal division: Dunkley

Area
  - Total: 130 km^{2} (50 sq mi)

Population
  - Total: 139,281 (2021)
  - Density: 1,070/km^{2} (2,770/sq mi)
- Website: City of Frankston
LGAs around City of Frankston
Kingston	Greater Dandenong	Casey
Port Phillip	City of Frankston	Casey
Port Phillip	Mornington Peninsula	Mornington Peninsula

The City of Frankston (officially known as Frankston City Council) is a local government area (LGA) in Victoria, Australia in the southern suburbs of Melbourne. It has an area of 130 square kilometres, and in August 2021, the City of Frankston recorded a population of 139,281.

Despite its similar area and name, the City of Frankston is a different entity to the former City of Frankston which existed from 1966 until 1994, which was a continuation of the former Shire of Frankston and was abolished under state government reforms. This is similar to the situation for the Shire of South Gippsland and Shire of Glenelg, but is unlike the City of Melbourne, City of Knox, City of Whittlesea and City of Melton, whose administrations stayed intact through the amalgamations of the early 1990s.

== Geography ==
The city is located on the eastern shores of Port Phillip, and is bounded on the north by the City of Kingston and the City of Greater Dandenong, on the east by the City of Casey, and on the south by the Shire of Mornington Peninsula. The boundaries of the city are defined largely on the north by Eel Race Road and Thompsons Road, on the east by the Dandenong-Hastings Road, and on the south by a complex boundary featuring Baxter-Tooradin Road, Golf Links Road and Humphries Road.

== History ==
The Frankston City was created in 1994 out of the remains of three abolished councils – the entirety of the former City of Frankston except the suburbs of Mount Eliza and Baxter; the suburbs of Carrum Downs, Langwarrin and Skye from the City of Cranbourne; and part of Carrum Downs from the City of Springvale.

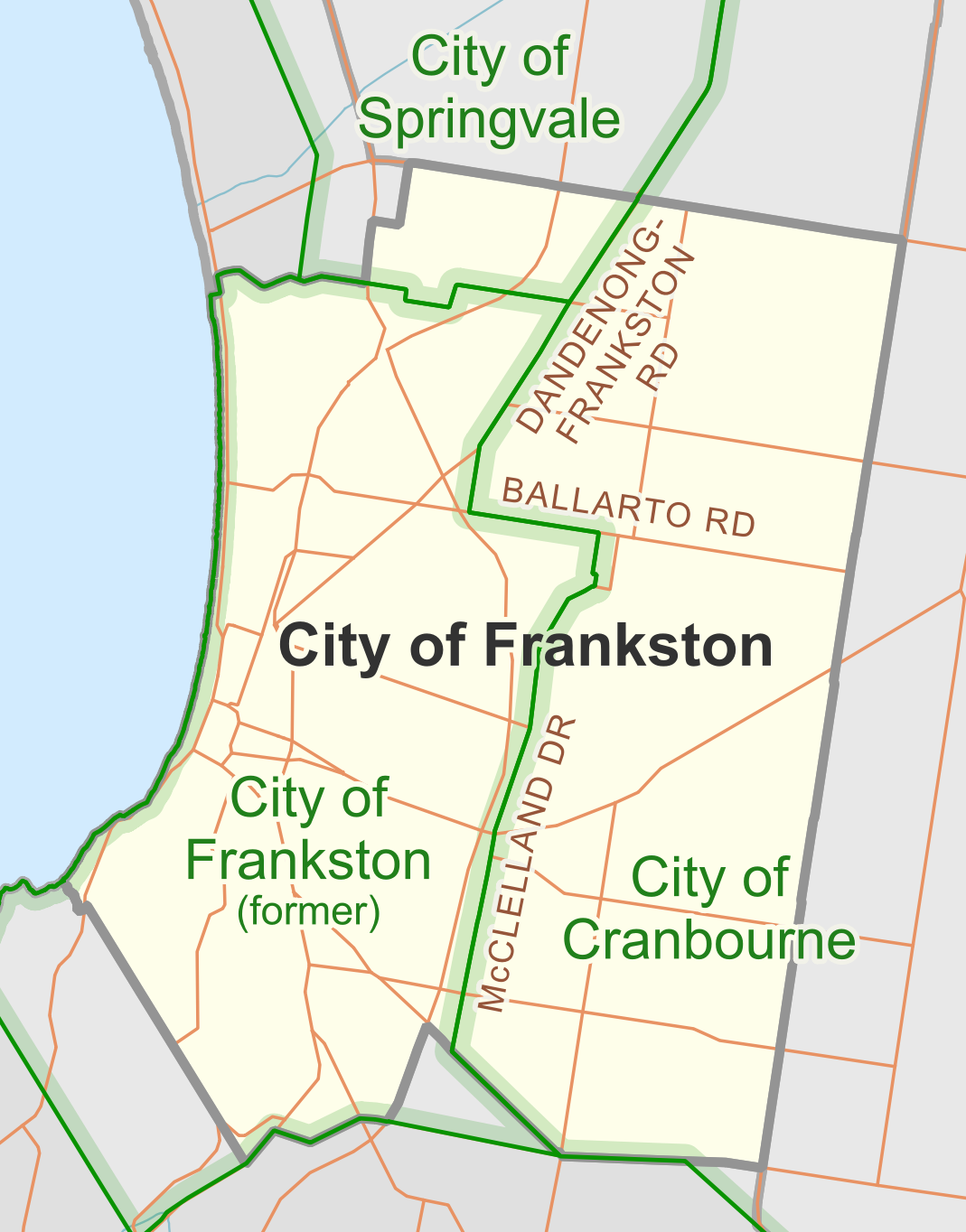
The City's predecessor LGAs (green) as they were in 1994

The major part of the city was first incorporated in 1860 as the Mornington Roads District, which became a shire in 1871 and was renamed Shire of Frankston and Hastings in 1893, losing its western riding to form the Shire of Mornington, which has since been amalgamated into the Shire of Mornington Peninsula. On 19 October 1960, the Shire of Frankston and Hastings split in two, with the western part remaining as the Shire of Frankston, and the eastern part being incorporated as the Shire of Hastings.

Frankston was officially proclaimed as a city on 24 August 1966, to be known as the City of Frankston in a ceremony attended by Queen Elizabeth II.

In 1993 the state government announced a major statewide program of local government amalgamations, most of which took effect on 15 December 1994. Most councils and their LGA's were abolished with new ones being created to replace them.

Some changes occurred between the release of the Local Government Board report in July and the actual amalgamation – the original plan was to merge with the City of Chelsea and take Braeside and Carrum Downs from the City of Springvale. However, Frankston City Council submitted that it should expand eastwards instead, as well as taking Mount Eliza and Baxter. By October, the present boundaries had been agreed upon, but the new entity was to be known as the City of Nepean. This appeared in the Board's final report in November 1994. Despite this recommendation, the State Government ultimately decided to retain a variation of the historical name, designating the new entity as Frankston City.

== Council ==
2024 ward boundaries. Expand the map and click on a ward to see the ward name

The current council, as of November 2024, in order of wards, is:

Ward	Party	Councillor	Notes
Ballam	Independent	Kris Bolam	Mayor
Centenary	Liberal	Michael O'Reilly	
Derinya	Labor	Brad Hill	
Elisabeth Murdoch	Independent	Cherie Wanat	
Kananook	Greens	Emily Green	
Lyrebird	Liberal	Steffie Conroy	Deputy Mayor
Pines	Independent	Sue Baker	
Wilton	Independent	David Asker	
Yamala	Independent	Nathan Butler	

== Mayors ==
The following Frankston councillors have served as mayor since the inaugural elections in 1997:

- 1997-1998 Wayne Woods
- 1998-1999 William (Bill) Parkin
- 1999-2000 David-Jon Robert Dawn
- 2000-2001 Mark Conroy
- 2001-2001 Mark Conroy (March 2001 to October 2001)
- 2001-2002 Cathy Wilson (October 2001 - March 2002)
- 2002-2003 Cathy Wilson
- 2003-2004 Cathy Wilson
- 2004-2005 Barry Priestly
- 2005-2006 Rochelle McArthur
- 2006-2007 Vicki McClelland
- 2007-2008 Glenn Aitken
- 2008-2008 Alistair Wardle (March 2008 - November 2008)
- 2008-2009 Colin Hampton
- 2009-2010 Christine Richards
- 2010-2011 Kris Bolam JP
- 2011-2012 Brian Cunial
- 2012-2013 Sandra Mayer
- 2013-2014 Darrel Taylor
- 2014-2015 Sandra Mayer
- 2015-2016 James Dooley
- 2016-2017 Brian Cunial
- 2017-2018 Colin Hampton
- 2018-2019 Michael O'Reilly
- 2019-2020 Sandra Mayer - Mayor Emeritus
- 2020-2021 Kris Bolam JP
- 2021-2024 Nathan Conroy - Mayor Emeritus
- 2024-2025 Kris Bolam JP - Mayor Emeritus

== Townships and localities ==
The city had a population of 139,281 in the 2021 census, up from 134,143 in the 2016 census.

Population
Locality	2016	2021
Carrum Downs	20,711	21,976
Frankston	36,097	37,331
Frankston North	5,762	5,711
Frankston South	18,199	18,801
Langwarrin	22,588	23,588
Langwarrin South	1,248	1,346
Sandhurst	4,981	5,211
Seaford	16,463	17,215
Skye	8,096	8,088

== Facilities ==
Notable facilities/locations within the LGA include;

- Peninsula Aquatic and Recreation Centre or PARC; a $49.7 million aquatic facility constructed in 2014 owned wholly by the Frankston City Council.
- Frankston Park; known commercially as Kinetic Stadium, is a suburban Australian rules football ground located in Frankston. It is home to the Frankston Football Club, which plays in the Victorian Football League, and the Hawthorn Football Club, which plays in the AFLW. It is also the location of the first ever Australian Scout Jamboree in 1935 attended by Lord Robert Baden-Powell.
- Robinsons Park; the home ground of the Frankston Softball Association and the Frankston Tomatoes Baseball Club located in Frankston South.
- Jubilee Park; a 13 hectare park in Frankston with Australian rules football ovals, cricket pitches, netball courts, and a stadium. The 1000-seat stadium is the home ground of the Frankston & District Netball Association, the Frankston Peninsula Premier Cricket Club, and the Peninsula Waves Netball Club.
- Ballam Park; a 30 hectare park with open areas and sporting fields including a premier athletics track which is home to the Frankston Little Athletics Club, AFL, soccer and cricket. The Park is also home to Ballam Park Homestead, an historic home and museum from the 1850s run by the Frankston Historical Society.
- Frankston Arts Centre; a purpose-built 800 seat performing and visual arts venue designed by renowned Australian Architect, Daryl Jackson, it was opened in 1995 by then Prime Minister, the Hon. Paul Keating.
- Pines Forest Aquatic Centre; an outdoor pool in Frankston North.
- Wedge Road Reserve; a park in northern Carrum Downs with Aussie rules football ovals, tennis courts and a playground. This park is the home ground of Skye Football Club, an Australian rules team in the Southern Football Netball League.
- Centenary Park Golf Course; a council-run public golf course in Langwarrin North.

== Libraries ==
Frankston City Libraries operates three council-run libraries. The facilities include a seed library and a library of things in addition to books. Membership is free to anyone, regardless of residency within the City of Frankston.

Branches:

- Frankston Library
- Carrum Downs Library
- Seaford Library

== Friendship & Sister Cities ==
- Susono, in Shizuoka, Japan (established in 1982, re-affirmed in 2011 and 2025)
- Wuxi, in Jiangsu Province, China (established in 2011)
- Suva, in Rewa Province, Fiji (established in 2021)
- Annapolis, in Maryland, the United States of America (established in 2025)

== See also ==
- City of Frankston (former)
- List of places on the Victorian Heritage Register in the City of Frankston
- Mornington Peninsula and Western Port Biosphere Reserve
