= Bangholme =

- Town
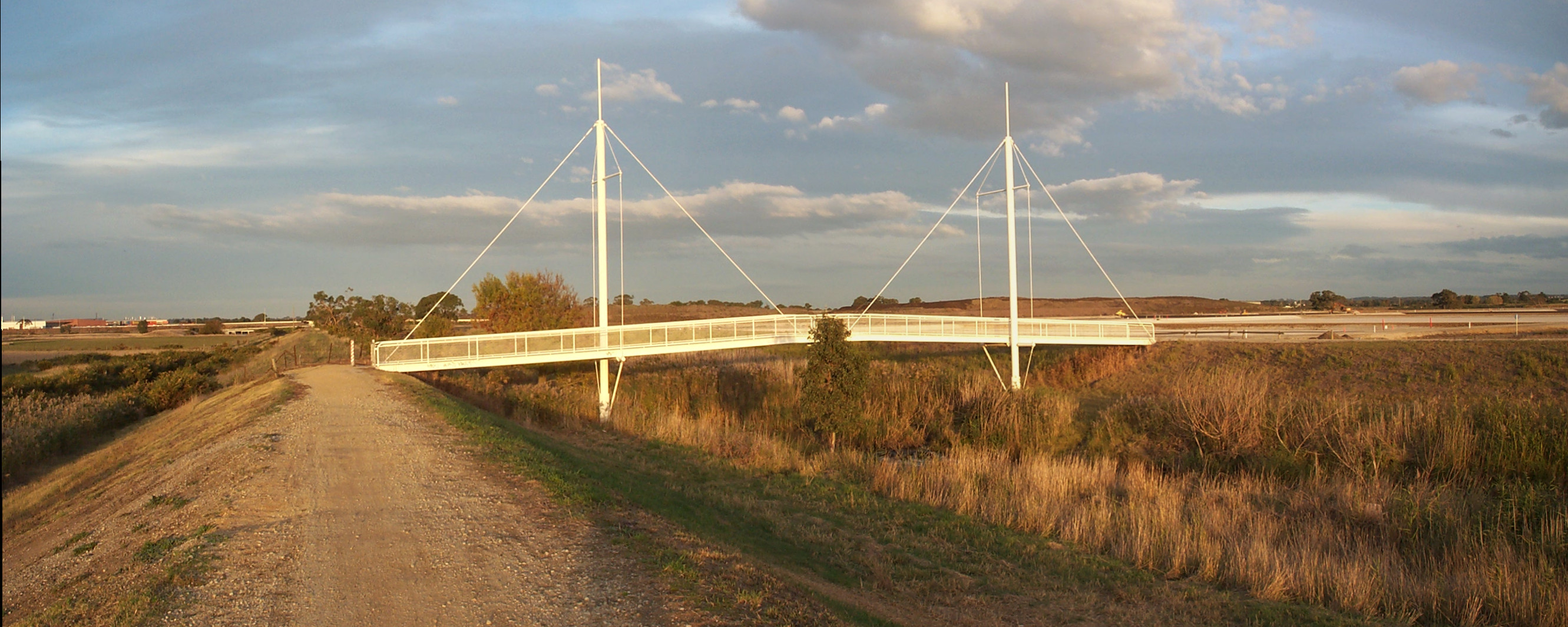
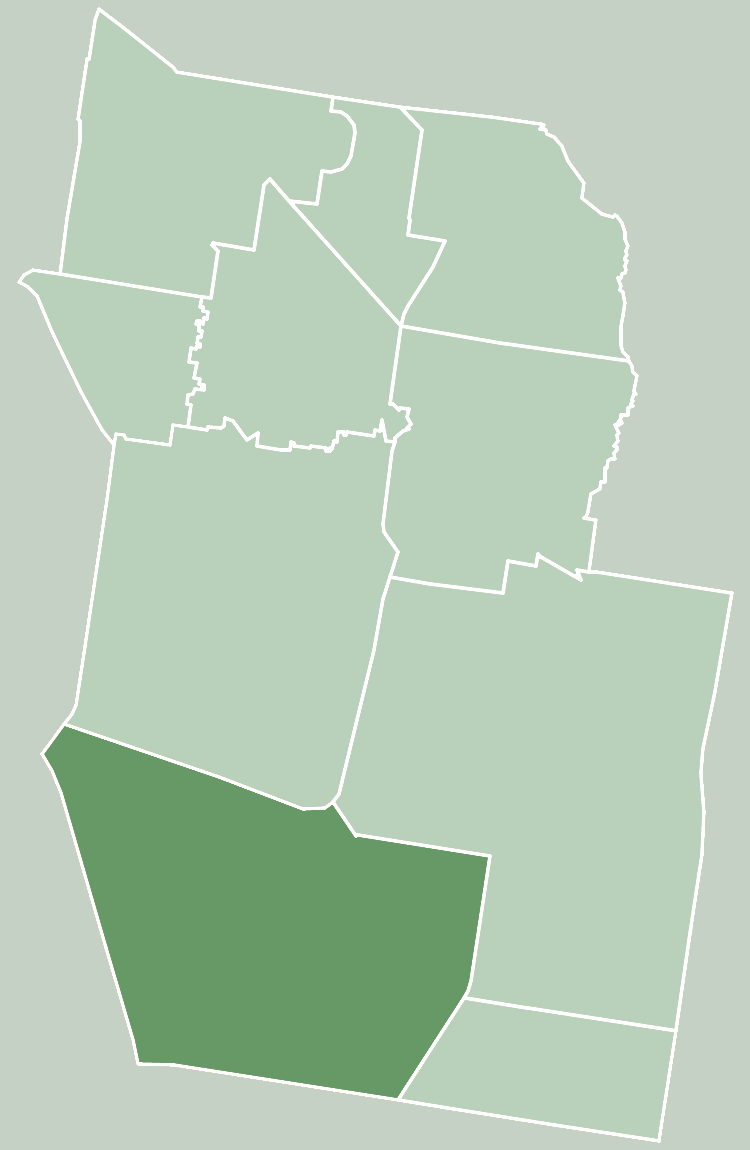
- Bicycle and pedestrian bridge crossing Eummemmering Creek in Bangholme Map of City of Greater Dandenong showing Bangholme
- Coordinates: 38°02′56″S 145°09′58″E
- Country: Australia
- State: Victoria
- City: Melbourne
- LGA: City of Greater Dandenong
- Location: 31 km (19 mi) from Melbourne; 9 km (5.6 mi) from Dandenong
- Established: 1925

Government
  - State electorates: Carrum; Mordialloc
  - Federal division: Isaacs

Area
  - Total: 30 km^{2} (12 sq mi)

Population
  - Total: 749 (2021 census)
  - Density: 25/km^{2} (65/sq mi)
- Postcode: 3175
Localities around Bangholme
Waterways	Keysborough	Dandenong South
Chelsea Heights	Bangholme	Lyndhurst
Patterson Lakes	Carrum Downs	Sandhurst

Bangholme is a locality in the City of Greater Dandenong, Victoria, Australia, 31 km (19 mi) south-east of Melbourne's Central Business District. Bangholme recorded a population of 749 at the 2021 census.

Located adjacent to the urban area, the area is semi-rural and is part of Melbourne's South East Green Wedge, with a significant part of the land used by the Melbourne Water Eastern Sewage Treatment Plant, and the remainder being mostly small land holdings, with some used for horse acreage.

The EastLink tollway passes through the area.

Willow Lodge Village, a mobile home development, is located on Frankston-Dandenong Road.

== History ==
Bangholme Post Office opened on 15 June 1925, and closed in 1943.

== Demographics ==
Bangholme has a SEIFA score of 744, indicating a high level of disadvantage — it is in the bottom percentile nationally and has the lowest score of any Melbourne suburb.

== Sport ==
The National Water Sports Centre is located in Bangholme adjacent to the Patterson River. Originally the watersports centre was created for the 1996 Melbourne Olympics, which was lost to Atlanta. Since then the Watersports centre has had no major updates besides the water park that operates on the same land.

Golfers play at the course of the Eastern Sward Golf Club on Thompson Road, Bangholme.

Horse riding lessons are conducted at BlinkBonnie Equestrian Centre on Pillars Road.

Horse agistment (paddocks for hire) is also available at various properties on and near Pillars Road.

== See also ==
- City of Springvale – Bangholme was previously within this former local government area.
