= Lyndhurst, Victoria =

Lyndhurst
- Suburb
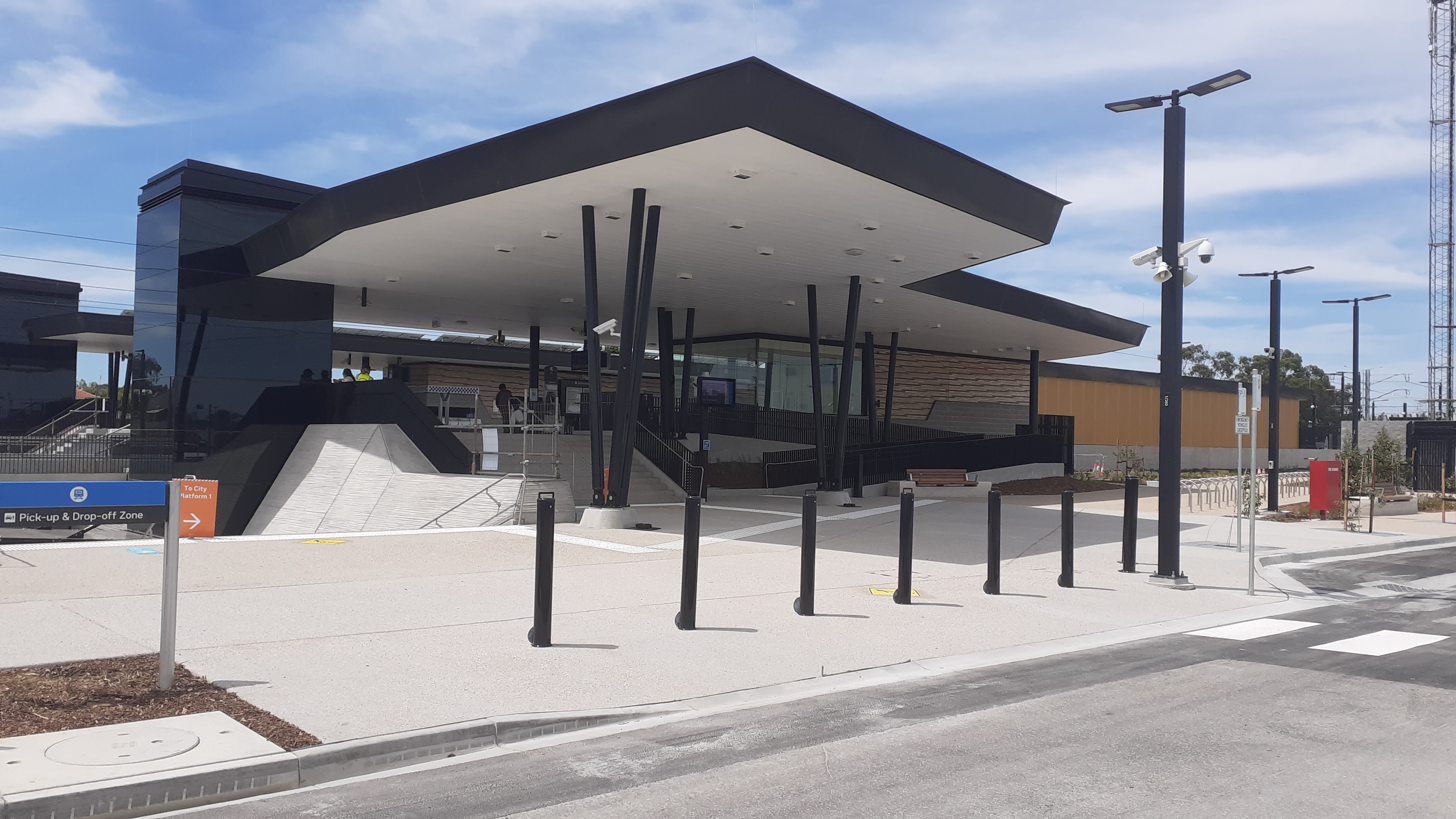
- Merinda Park Station, Lyndhurst in 2022

- Interactive map of Lyndhurst
- Coordinates: 38°04′14″S 145°14′48″E
- Country: Australia
- State: Victoria
- City: Melbourne
- LGAs: City of Casey; City of Greater Dandenong
- Location: 36 km (22 mi) from Melbourne; 10 km (6.2 mi) from Dandenong

Government
  - State electorate: Carrum
  - Federal divisions: Holt; Isaacs

Area
  - Total: 1.7 km^{2} (0.66 sq mi)

Population
  - Total: 8,926 (2021 census)
  - Density: 5,250/km^{2} (13,600/sq mi)
- Postcode: 3975
Suburbs around Lyndhurst
	Dandenong South	Hampton Park
Bangholme	Lyndhurst	Lynbrook
Sandhurst	Skye	Cranbourne West

Lyndhurst is a suburb in Melbourne, Victoria, Australia, 36 km south-east of Melbourne's Central Business District, located within the Cities of Casey and Greater Dandenong local government areas. Lyndhurst recorded a population of 8,926 at the 2021 census.

Lyndhurst Post Office opened on 1 January 1867 and closed in 1976.

After the Bracks government's decisions to abandon plans for a toxic waste dump near Mildura, the continued use of the existing Lyndhurst facility was part of the replacement plan.

The Casey side of Lyndhurst lies inside the Urban Growth Boundary, and the development phase is almost complete. The Greater Dandenong side (to the west of the Western Port Highway) is outside the Urban Growth Boundary and is semi rural, and forms part of the South Eastern green wedge.

In 2009, the Victorian Department of Education and Early Childhood Development purchased a 3.5-hectare site within Marriott Waters and earmarked the site for Lyndhurst Primary School. The Prep to Year 6 primary school opened in 2011 and was built under the Partnerships Victoria in Schools Model which has seen the school built and maintained through public–private partnership arrangements between the Victorian state government and Axiom Education.

Lyndhurst railway station was located in the suburb on the Cranbourne line, but did not see any passenger traffic. Freight traffic to the cement facility ended in 2009. Passenger rail in the area is now serviced by Lynbrook or Merinda Park stations.

The primary commercial area for the suburb is Marriott Waters Shopping Centre, which opened in February 2013.

== See also ==
- City of Cranbourne – Lyndhurst was previously within this former local government area.
