= List of places on the Victorian Heritage Register in the City of Monash =

This is a list of places on the Victorian Heritage Register in the City of Monash in Victoria, Australia. The Victorian Heritage Register is maintained by the Heritage Council of Victoria.

The Victorian Heritage Register, as of 2020, listed the following seven state-registered places within the City of Monash:

Place name	Place #	Location	Suburb or Town	Co-ordinates	Built	State registered	Photo
Clayton North Primary School	H1084	1714 Dandenong Rd	Clayton	37°54′44″S 145°07′22″E	1909	1 June 1995	
Clayton railway station	H1667	274 Clayton Rd	Clayton	37°55′29″S 145°07′15″E	1891	20 August 1982	
Ctesiphon Concrete Supermarket and Residence	H1377	1 Cleveland Rd	Ashwood	37°52′03″S 145°06′19″E	1954	20 November 1997	
Religious Centre, Monash University	H2188	Building 9, Clayton campus, 1-131 Wellington Rd	Clayton	37°54′43″S 145°08′03″E	1967-68	11 December 2008	
Oakleigh Motel	H2193	1650 Dandenong Rd	Oakleigh East	37°54′27″S 145°06′55″E	1956-57	7 May 2009	
Petersville Factory Administration Building	H2394	254-294 Wellington Rd	Mulgrave	37°55′06″S 145°09′13″E	1962-63	19 December 2019	
Waverley Park	H1883	2 Stadium Cct and 566-634 Wellington Rd	Mulgrave	37°55′42″S 145°11′23″E	1970	7 September 2000	
