= City of Monash =

Coordinates: 37°53′S 145°10′E

- Local government area
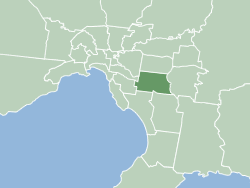
- Location of Monash within the Melbourne metropolitan area.

- Interactive map of City of Monash
- Country: Australia
- State: Victoria
- Region: Greater Melbourne
- Established: 1994
- Council seat: Glen Waverley

Government
  - Mayor: Stuart James
  - State electorates: Ashwood; Glen Waverley; Mulgrave; Oakleigh
  - Federal divisions: Bruce; Chisholm; Hotham

Area
  - Total: 81.5 km^{2} (31.5 sq mi)

Population
  - Total: 209,268 (2024) (29th)
  - Density: 2,567.7/km^{2} (6,650/sq mi)
- Website: City of Monash
LGAs around City of Monash
Boroondara	Whitehorse	Maroondah
Stonnington	City of Monash	Knox
Glen Eira	Kingston	Dandenong

The City of Monash is a local government area in Victoria, Australia, in the south-eastern suburbs of Melbourne. Established in 1994, it covers an area of 81.5 square kilometres (31.5 sq mi), and had an estimated population of 209,268 people in 2024. The council's offices are located in the suburb of Glen Waverley.

== History ==
The City of Monash was once hunting grounds for two groups of First Nations peoples, the Wurundjeri Woi-wurrung in the north and the Bunurong people in the south.

The City of Monash, named after World War I commander Sir John Monash and the local Monash University (established 1958), was created on 15 December 1994 when the state government amalgamated local councils all over Victoria, merging a substantial portion of the former City of Oakleigh with the whole of the former City of Waverley.

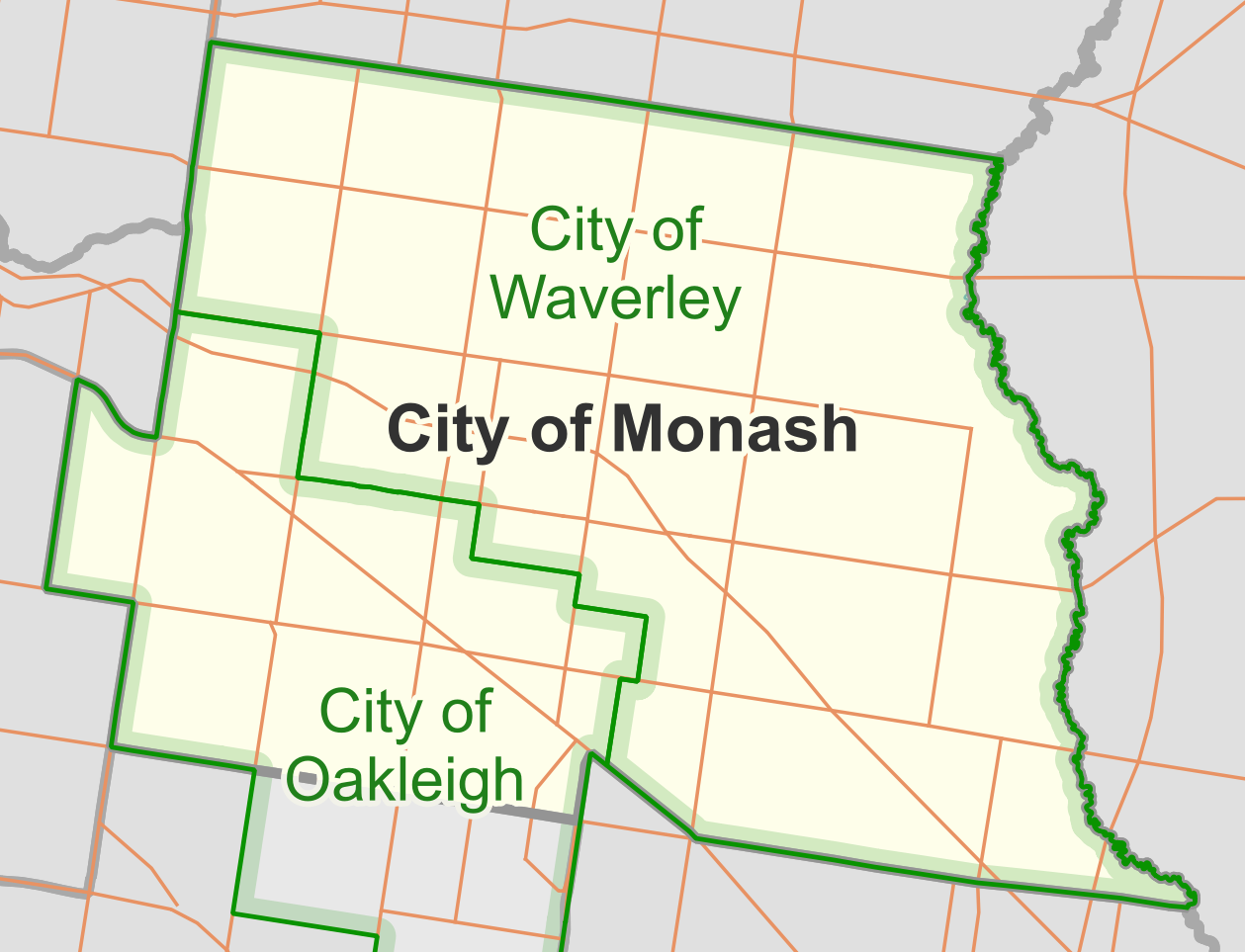
The City of Monash's predecessor LGAs (green) as they were in 1994

== Townships and localities ==
At the 2021 census, the city had a population of 190,397 up from 182,618 at the 2016 census.

Population
Locality	2016	2021
Ashwood	6,886	7,154
Burwood^	15,019	15,147
Chadstone	8,641	9,552
Clayton	19,358	18,988
Glen Waverley	40,327	42,642
Hughesdale	7,556	7,563
Huntingdale	1,862	1,949
Mount Waverley	33,611	35,340
Mulgrave	19,368	19,889
Notting Hill	3,050	2,895
Oakleigh	7,893	8,442
Oakleigh East	6,444	6,804
Oakleigh South^	9,261	9,851
Wheelers Hill	19,753	20,652

^ - Territory divided with another LGA

== Council ==
=== Current composition ===
Party	Councillors
Independent Labor	7
Independent	4
Total	11

The current council, elected in October 2024, is:

Ward	Councillor	Party	Notes
Banksia	Cameron Little	Independent	
Blackburn	Rebecca Paterson	Independent Labor	
Gallaghers	Geoff Lake	Independent Labor	
Gardiners Creek	Anjalee de Silva	Independent	Member of the Greens until 2024
Jells	Elisha Lee	Independent Labor	Deputy Mayor
Mayfield	Brian Little	Independent Labor	
Scotchmans Creek	Nicky Luo	Independent Labor	
University	Josh Fergeus	Independent	Member of the Greens until 2024
Warrigal	Stuart James	Independent Labor	
Waverley Park	Shane McCluskey	Independent	
Wellington	Paul Klisaris	Independent Labor	Mayor

=== Mayors ===
Mayor	Term	#
Peter Vlahos	1997–1998	1
Gill Clare	1998–1999	2
Peter Holdsworth	1999–2000	3
Matthew Evans	2000–2001	4
Tom Morrissey	2001–2002	5
Geoff Lake	2002–2003	6
Geoff Lake	2003–2004	
Joy Banerji	2004 (Note: From 1996 until 2004, the annual election of the mayor for the following 12 months occurred in March. New legislation effective from 2004 onwards changed the date of the election of the mayor to November or December. There was a truncated transitional term of office from March to November 2004.)	7
Steve Dimopoulos	2004–2005	8
Joy Banerji	2005–2006	
Tom Morrissey	2006–2007	
Paul Klisaris	2007–2008	9
Paul Klisaris	2008–2009	
Charlotte Baines	2009–2010	10
Greg Male	2010–2011	11
Stefanie Perri	2011–2012	12
Micaela Drieberg	2012–2013	13
Geoff Lake	2013–2014	
Paul Klisaris	2014–2015	
Stefanie Perri	2015–2016	
Geoff Lake	2016 (Note: Lake served as mayor from April until October in 2016 to take over from Stefanie Perri, who resigned to contest Chisholm at the 2016 federal election.)	
Rebecca Paterson	2016–2017	14
Paul Klisaris	2017–2018	
Shane McCluskey	2018–2019	15
Stuart James	2019–2020	16
Brian Little	2020–2021	17
Stuart James	2021–2022	
Tina Samardzija	2022–2023	18
Nicky Luo	2023-2024	19
Paul Klisaris	2024-2025	
Stuart James	2025-2026	

== Past councillors ==
=== Single-member wards (1997−2005) ===
Year	Central	Damper	Huntingdale	Jell	Napier	University	Warrigal	Wellington
Year	Councillor	Councillor	Councillor	Councillor	Councillor	Councillor	Councillor	Councillor
1997	Matthew Evans (Independent)	Tom Morrissey (Independent)	Nick Gregory (Independent)	Gill Clare (Independent)	Peter Holdsworth (Independent)	Peter Vlahos (Liberal)	Jack Davis (Independent)	Kathy Magee (Independent)
2000	Matthew Evans (Independent)	Tom Morrissey (Independent)	Felicity Smith (Independent)	Peter Holdsworth (Independent)	Geoff Lake (Labor)	Peter Vlahos (Liberal)	Paul Klisaris (Labor)	Kathy Magee (Independent)
2003	Ross Smith (Independent)	Joy Banerji (Labor)	Steve Dimopoulos (Labor)	Peter McCall (Independent)	Geoff Lake (Labor)	Brian Little (Labor)	Vicki Bouziotis (Independent)	Jeanne Solity (Independent)

=== Multi-member wards (2005−2024) ===
==== Glen Waverley Ward ====
Year	Councillor	Party	Councillor	Party
2005	Geoff Lake	Labor	Dane Manzie	Independent
2008	Geoff Lake	Labor	Greg Male	Independent
2012	Geoff Lake	Labor	Katrina Nolan	Independent
2016	Geoff Lake	Labor	Lynette Saloumi	Independent
2018	Geoff Lake	Labor	Lynette Saloumi	Sustainable Australia
2020	Geoff Lake	Labor	Nicky Luo	Labor

==== Mount Waverley Ward ====
Year	Councillor	Party	Councillor	Party	Councillor	Party
2005	Joy Banerji	Labor	Tom Morrissey	Independent	Ryan Brown	Independent
2008	Joy Banerji	Labor	Tom Morrissey	Independent	Jieh-Yung Lo	Independent
2012	Brian Little	Labor	Tom Morrissey	Independent	Jieh-Yung Lo	Independent
2013	Brian Little	Labor	Rebecca Paterson	Independent	Jieh-Yung Lo	Independent
2016	Brian Little	Labor	Rebecca Paterson	Independent	MT Pang Tsoi	Liberal
2020	Brian Little	Labor	Rebecca Paterson	Independent	Anjalee de Silva	Greens
	Brian Little	Labor	Rebecca Paterson	Independent	Anjalee de Silva	Independent

==== Mulgrave Ward ====
Year	Councillor	Party	Councillor	Party	Councillor	Party
2005	Paul Klisaris	Labor	Charlotte Baines	Independent	Craig Shiell	Independent
2008	Paul Klisaris	Labor	Charlotte Baines	Independent	Micaela Drieberg	Independent
2012	Paul Klisaris	Labor	Robert Davies	Liberal	Micaela Drieberg	Independent
2016	John Sharkey	Independent	Robert Davies	Liberal	Micaela Drieberg	Independent
2016	Paul Klisaris	Labor	Robert Davies	Liberal	Shane McCluskey	Independent
2020	Paul Klisaris	Labor	Tina Samardzija	Labor	Shane McCluskey	Independent

==== Oakleigh Ward ====
Year	Councillor	Party	Councillor	Party	Councillor	Party
2005	Steve Dimopoulos	Labor	Denise McGill	Liberal	Gerry Kottek	Independent
2008	Steve Dimopoulos	Labor	Denise McGill	Liberal	Stefanie Perri	Labor
2012	Steve Dimopoulos	Labor	Theo Zographos	Liberal	Bill Pontikis	Independent
2014	Stefanie Perri	Labor	Theo Zographos	Liberal	Bill Pontikis	Independent
2016	Nga Hosking	Labor	Theo Zographos	Liberal	Bill Pontikis	Independent
2016	Stuart James	Labor	Theo Zographos	Liberal	Josh Fergeus	Greens
2020	Stuart James	Labor	Theo Zographos	Liberal	Josh Fergeus	Greens
	Stuart James	Labor	Theo Zographos	Liberal	Josh Fergeus	Independent

== Election results ==
=== 2024 ===
2024 Victorian local elections: Monash
Party	Votes	%	Swing	Seats	Change
Independent Labor	35,917	42.08		7	Steady
Independents	30,303	35.51		4	▲3
Independent Liberal	9,569	11.21		0	▼1
Greens	6,102	7.15		0	▼2
Libertarian	1,808	2.12	+2.12	0	Steady
Victorian Socialists	1,646	1.93	+1.93	0	Steady
Formal votes	85,345	97.39			
Informal votes	2,290	2.61			
Total	87,635	100.00		11	Steady
Registered voters / turnout	114,010				

=== 2020 ===
2020 Victorian local elections: Monash
Party	Votes	%	Swing	Seats	Change
Independent Labor	44,343	45.71		6	
Burwood Liberals	20,167	20.79		1	
Independent	14,907	15.37		2	
Greens	11,314	11.66		2	
Independent Liberal	4,154	4.28		0	
Sustainable Australia	2,122	2.19		0	Steady
Formal votes	97,007	95.02			
Informal votes	5,080	4.98			
Total	102,087	100.00		11	
Registered voters / turnout	120,823	84.49			

== Demographics ==
Monash has a diverse population, with 52% of its residents born overseas (compared to 29.0% across Melbourne), coming from more than 30 countries, with significant Chinese, UK, Greek, Indian, Malaysian and Sri Lankan populations. 42.4% of residents own their own home outright, compared to 33.1% in Melbourne, and 37.3% across Australia. The city is well educated, with 25.1% having a bachelor or higher degree (compared to 19.6% across Melbourne).

Selected historical census data for City of Monash Council local government area
Census Year		2006	2011	2016
Population	Estimated residents on census night		169,280	182,618
Population	% of Victoria population			3.08%
Population	% of Australian population			0.8%
Cultural and language diversity
Ancestry, top responses	Chinese			19.6%
Ancestry, top responses	English			14.7%
Ancestry, top responses	Australian			12.7%
Ancestry, top responses	Greek			5.7%
Ancestry, top responses	Indian			5.5%
Language, top responses (other than English)	Mandarin			14.7%
Language, top responses (other than English)	Greek			5.7%
Language, top responses (other than English)	Cantonese			4.8%
Language, top responses (other than English)	Sinhalese			2.5%
Language, top responses (other than English)	Italian			2.1%
Religious affiliation
Religious affiliation, top responses	No religion, so described			31.4%
Religious affiliation, top responses	Catholic			18.9%
Religious affiliation, top responses	Not stated			8.2%
Religious affiliation, top responses	Eastern Orthodox			7.3%
Religious affiliation, top responses	Buddhism			6.8%
Median weekly incomes
Personal income	Median weekly personal income			A$569
Personal income	% of Australian median income			85.95%
Family income	Median weekly family income			A$1,809
Family income	% of Australian median income			104.33%
Household income	Median weekly household income			A$1,512
Household income	% of Australian median income			105.15%

== Schools ==
=== State ===
There are 27 primary and 9 secondary state-based schools in the city of Monash.

- Ashwood High School
- Brentwood Secondary College
- Glen Waverley Secondary College
- Highvale Secondary College
- John Monash Science School
- Monash Tech School
- Mount Waverley Secondary College
- South Oakleigh Secondary College
- Wellington Secondary College
- Wheelers Hill Secondary College

=== Private ===
- Avila College
- Caulfield Grammar School (Wheelers Hill Campus)
- Huntingtower School
- Mazenod College
- Oakleigh Grammar
- Sacred Heart Girls' College
- Salesian College
- Wesley College (Glen Waverley Campus)

== Museum of Australian Photography (MAPh) ==
The Museum of Australian Photography (MAPh) collection has over 4,500 Australian photographs in their collection, many of which are available to access online via their website. The photographs reflect the history and development of Australian photographic practice from the 19th century to today. The collection is diverse and includes many iconic images and the work of photographers recognised as nationally significant. The gallery building was designed by Harry Seidler and opened in 1990.

== Sporting Teams ==
=== Soccer ===
- Oakleigh Cannons
- Monash City FC
- Mount Waverley Soccer Club
- Eastern Lions SC
- Brandon Park SC
- Glen Waverley SC

=== Australian Rules ===
- Oakleigh Chargers
- Chadstone Football Club
- Monash University Football Club
- Waverley Blues Football Club
- Waverley Park Hawks Junior Football Club
- Glen Waverley Rovers Junior Football Club
- Ajax Football Club

=== Netball ===
- Waverley Netball

== Public libraries ==
- Monash Public Library Service provides library service through six branch libraries: Clayton, Glen Waverley, Mount Waverley, Mulgrave, Oakleigh and Wheelers Hill, as well as a Home Library Service.
