= Monash Tech School =

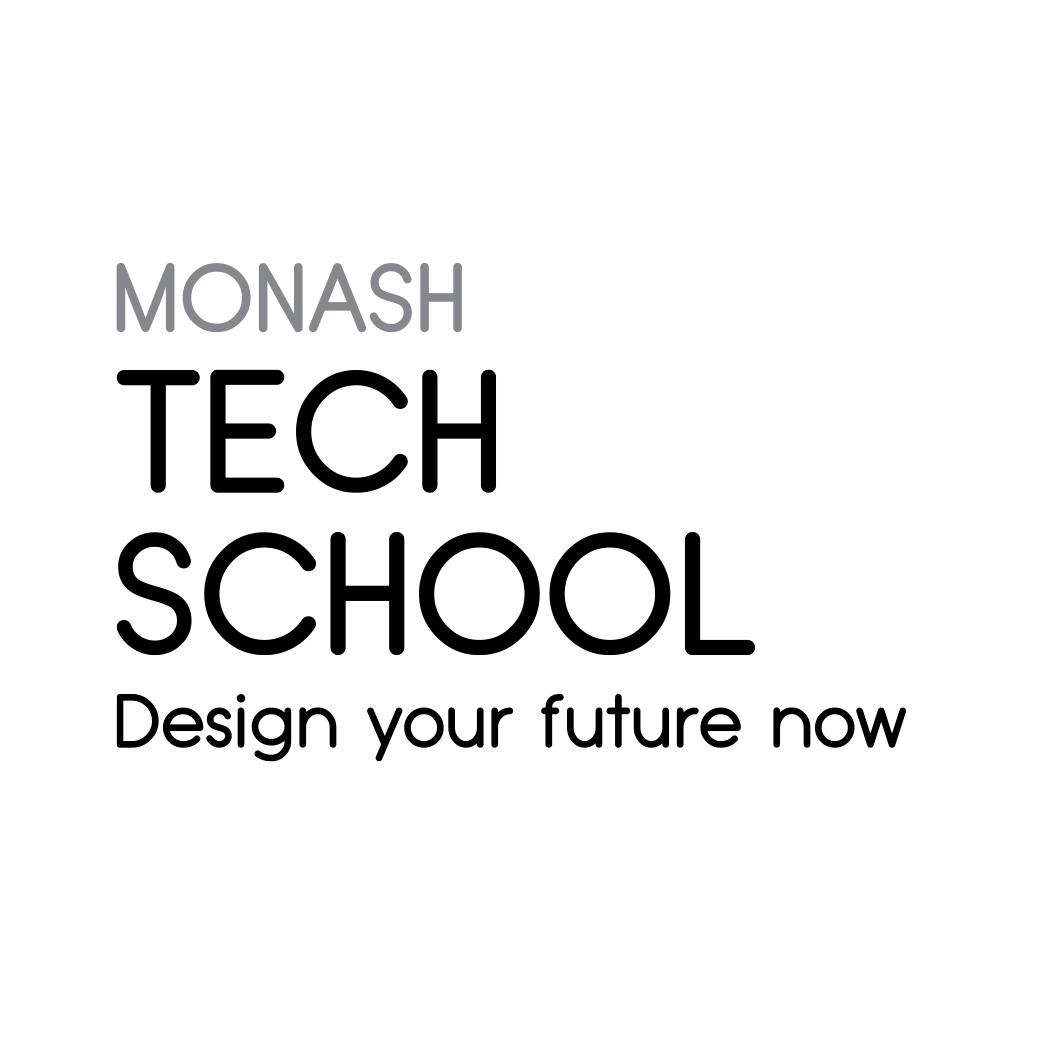

Location
- Level 1, 29 Ancora Imparo Way, Monash University; Clayton, Victoria, 3800; Australia
- Coordinates: 37°54′50.7″S 145°08′0.27″E

Information
- Type: Tech School
- Motto: Design your future now
- Established: 2017
- Director: Neil Carmona-Vickery
- Staff: 11
- Years: 7–12
- Affiliations: Monash University
- Website: www.monashtechschool.vic.edu.au

Monash Tech School is one of ten Tech Schools funded by the Victorian State Government. Its name is linked to STEM education and references 'Technology' rather than 'Technical' training. It is hosted by Monash University and administered by John Monash Science School. Monash Tech School is located at Monash University in Clayton.

The Tech School is a shared learning centre that provides real-world experiences to secondary students from partner government schools to amplify their achievement and engagement in STEM. With currently three-quarters of occupations require sciences, technology, engineering and mathematics (STEM) skills. Their programs bring together design thinking, prototyping skills and product delivery that allows students to build their technical and interpersonal skills. Each program incorporates industry, tertiary and research know-how and engages our partner school teachers in professional learning.

== Directors ==
The following individuals have served as Director of Monash Tech School:

Ordinal	Officeholder	Term start	Term end	Time in office
1	Ashley Van Krieken	2017	2019	1–2 years
2	Neil Carmona-Vickery	2019	“incumbent”	6–7 years

== Partners ==
Monash Tech School is partnered with the following schools and training organisations:

=== School partners ===
- Ashwood High School
- Ashwood School
- Brentwood Secondary College
- Glen Waverley Secondary College
- Glenallen School
- Highvale Secondary College
- John Monash Science School
- Monash Children's Hospital School
- Monash Special Developmental School
- Mount Waverley Secondary College
- South Oakleigh Secondary College
- Wellington Secondary College
- Wheelers Hill Secondary College

=== Other partners ===
- Anatomics
- Appearition
- ARC Centre of Excellence in Future Low-Energy Electronics Technologies (FLEET)
- Australian Information Industry Association
- BioQuisitive
- CSIRO
- City of Monash
- Convergence Science Network
- Department of Jobs, Precincts and Regions
- Gateway LLEN
- Holmesglen TAFE
- Howmet Aerospace
- Inspiring Australia
- Invinity Energy Systems
- Royal Society Of Victoria
- Yakult
