= Huntingdale, Victoria =

Huntingdale Melbourne, Victoria
- Pedestrian underpass in front of Huntingdale train station

- Coordinates: 37.907°S 145.094°E
- Population: 1,949 (SAL 2021)
- Postcode(s): 3166
- Area: 0.8 km^{2} (0.3 sq mi)
- Location: 16 km (10 mi) from Melbourne
- LGA(s): City of Monash
- State electorate(s): Oakleigh
- Federal division(s): Hotham
Suburbs around Huntingdale:
Oakleigh		Oakleigh East
Oakleigh	Huntingdale
Oakleigh South	Oakleigh South	Clayton

Huntingdale is a suburb in Melbourne, Victoria, Australia, 16 km south-east of Melbourne's Central Business District, located within the City of Monash local government area. Huntingdale recorded a population of 1,949 at the 2021 census.

The suburb is bordered by Huntingdale Road to the east, North Road to the south, Franklyn Street to the west and the Princes Highway to the north. The suburbs of Oakleigh, Huntingdale, and Oakleigh East all share the same postcode of 3166. The suburb has both residential and industrial areas, with the southern sections between Hargeaves Street and North Road being largely industrial.

The suburb has a noticeable Muslim and Hindu presence, with a mosque and a Hindu temple, as well as being home to the Australian Islamic Bangladesh Council.

== History ==
The land that is now Huntingdale was originally inhabited by the Wurundjeri and Boon wurrung people of the Kulin nation. Huntingdale was first built up in the early 20th century as part of the expansion of Oakleigh. Huntingdale was earlier known as Oakleigh East or East Oakleigh. Oakleigh East and Huntingdale became separate suburbs in 1955.

The Post Office opened on 15 June 1918 as Oakleigh East. The railway station opened in 1927 as East Oakleigh, and both were renamed with the name Huntingdale in 1955.

In 1941, the Huntingdale Golf Club was opened.

In 1998, the Australian Bangladesh Islamic Council was founded, and the Huntingdale Mosque was opened.

In 2014, the Sankat Mochan Kendra centre was opened on North Road. The temple provides free meals to the community, as well as aid and support for women and children in domestic violence situations and for recent Indian migrants to Australia.

In 2015, the Huntingdale Mosque was attacked after a brick was thrown through the window.

== Facilities and services ==
Along Huntingdale Road there is a small commercial strip which straddles the neighbouring suburb of Oakleigh. There are several services and facilities including the Huntingdale mosque, a halal butcher, a grocery, a fruit market, a Subway restaurant, an IGA, restaurants and cafés, a laundromat, a pharmacist, a 24-hour gym, and a post office. There is also a True Buddha School building on Stafford Street.

On the corner of Huntingdale Road and North Road, there is a gaming bar and café, and the Sankat Mochan Samiti Temple. This commercial hub is adjacent to the Oakleigh Barracks. Golfers play at the course of the Huntingdale Golf Club on Windsor Avenue in the neighbouring suburb of Oakleigh South.

The suburb's primary school, Huntingdale Primary School, is technically located in the neighbouring suburb of Oakleigh South. The school provides a bilingual education, with students learning in both English and Japanese.

== Transport ==
The suburb is serviced by Huntingdale railway station on the Pakenham and Cranbourne railway lines. The station is technically located in the neighbouring suburb of Oakleigh. In 2018, the station was upgraded to include a new bus interchange and new car park facilities. The station is frequently used by students who attend the nearby Monash University Clayton Campus. These students catch the 601 shuttle bus between the railway station and campus, which runs solely for Monash students and staff.

The suburb is also serviced by several bus routes, including the 900 SmartBus route, the 630, and the 704.

== See also ==
- City of Oakleigh – Huntingdale was previously within this former local government area.
