= Stuart James (disambiguation) =

Stuart James (born 1978) is an Australian politician.

Stuart James may also refer to:

- Stuart James Campbell (born 1958), English builder convicted of abduction and murder of Danielle Jones
- Stuart Andrew (born 1971), Welsh politician
- Stuart Etherington (born 1955), British charity executive and former social worker
