= Silvio Foschini =

Australian rules footballer

Personal information
- Full name: Silvio Foschini
- Born: 18 September 1963 (age 63)
- Original team: Clayton
- Height: 175 cm (5 ft 9 in)
- Weight: 75 kg (165 lb)
- Position: Rover / Forward pocket

Playing career^{1}
Years	Club	Games (Goals)
1981–1982	Sydney Swans	38 (79)
1983–1986, 1988	St Kilda	69 (87)
Total		107 (166)
- ^{1} Playing statistics correct to the end of 1988.

Silvio Foschini (born 18 September 1963) is a former Australian rules footballer who played for the Sydney Swans and St Kilda Football Club in the Victorian Football League (VFL). He is best known for taking the VFL to court over its refusal to grant him a clearance, which led, among other things, to the end of the League's Zoning system.

== Career ==
Foschini was aged just 17 in 1981 when he kicked three goals on his league debut for South Melbourne against Hawthorn and finished the season with 37 goals. The club relocated to Sydney the following year and Foschini, again playing as a forward, kicked 42 goals.

Despite his success he was unhappy in Sydney and decided to return to his home state of Victoria in 1983, joining St Kilda. He however had not received a clearance to sign with St Kilda and as a result the issue went to court. In what was a high-profile case at the time, Foschini argued that the VFL's clearance rules breached restraint of trade laws. He won the case and was allowed to play for St Kilda, in doing so helping to abolish the zoning system from the league.

At St Kilda he was used mainly as a rover and played for the club until a shoulder injury ended his career in 1988.

== Personal life ==
Foschini attended Westall Secondary College in Clayton South, Victoria and Mazenod College in Mulgrave, Victoria. Foschini's parents were both born in Italy and he was shortlisted for the VFL/AFL Italian Team of the Century. He played soccer as a child and his son Matthew Foschini plays soccer (football) for Melbourne Victory FC, South Melbourne FC and Oakleigh Cannons FC.
