= Avila College =

Coordinates: 37.8747°S 145.1333°E

- Mount Waverley, Victoria; Australia

Information
- Type: Independent, single-sex, day school
- Motto: Latin: Ecclesiae Filia (Daughters of the Church)
- Denomination: Roman Catholic
- Established: 1965
- Principal: Dr Michelle Cotter
- Employees: 170
- Years: 7–12
- Enrolment: 1400 (2017)
- Colours: White, Blue, Red
- Website: www.avilacollege.vic.edu.au

Avila College is a Roman Catholic day school for girls which is located in the Melbourne suburb of Mount Waverley. The school was established in 1965 by the Presentation Sisters who accepted an invitation from the parishes in the Waverley area to establish a Catholic Girls' College. The school identifies Saint Teresa of Avila as its patron saint, from whom the Latin motto 'Filiae Ecclesiae' (Daughters of the Church) is derived.

== History ==
Avila College commenced in 1965 in temporary classrooms on the grounds of St Leonard's Catholic Primary School, Glen Waverley. The college was established by the parishes of Mount Waverley, Glen Waverley, Syndal, Mulgrave and Jordanville who invited the Presentation Sisters to administer a Catholic college to provide for families in the area.

From an initial enrollment of 110 girls in Forms 1 and 2 – or years 7 and 8 – the college has grown to become one of the larger Catholic secondary schools for girls in the state with an enrollment of about 1100 students, and 150 staff.

Avila moved to its current location in Charles Street, Mount Waverley, in 1966.

=== Principals ===
Sister Patricia Carroll was the founding principal of the college.

The list of principals is as follows.

- Sr. Patricia Carroll dec. (1965–1970)
- Sr. Raymonde Taylor (1971–1973)
- Sr. Josepha Dunlop (1974–1979)
- Patricia Ryan (1980–1986)
- Maureen Thompson (1987–1995)
- Filomena Salvatore dec. (1995–2005)
- Liz Gleeson (2006–2010)
- Louise Gunther (2011–2016)
- Dr Michelle Cotter (2017–present)

== Extra-curricular activities ==
The college offers extra-curricular programs which includes a heritage group, extended mathematics, social justice, reconciliation and conservation groups, music ensembles such as an orchestra and ensembles, eg. flute ensemble, a book club, public speaking and debating, and immersion trips to Central Australia and overseas. The school also has a brother school, Mazenod College, with which they collaborate on events, such as SMASH collaborations and orchestra workshops.

== Notable Alumnae ==
- Shae Brown – Netballer
- Jill Hennessy – Politician
- Michelle Andrews – Co-host of Shameless
- Jess Perkins – Co-host of Do Go On and Triple J presenter
- Indi Hartwell – Professional Wrestler

== House teams ==
- Nagle (Blue)
- Chisholm (Green)
- Flynn (Gold)
- Mackillop (Red)

The house system at Avila comprises four coloured houses Nagle (blue), Chisholm (green), Flynn (gold) and Mackillop (red) for all of which the names are derived from the surnames of inspirational women relevant to the history of the Catholic Church and education. Each student is allocated a house colour at the beginning of their schooling at Avila (and typically are placed in a house accordance with whether they have an elder sister already attending the school or are assigned the same house as their mother if she attended Avila) for which they're a member of throughout their time at Avila.

=== Nagle ===
Named after Nano Nagle, founder of the Presentation Sisters order and commonly known as "the Lady of the Lantern". Nano Nagle is known for her work setting up schools in Ireland and supporting needy families in defiance of the Penal laws.

=== Chisholm ===
Named after Caroline Chisholm, a philanthropist and humanitarian who worked to support new settlers in finding jobs and housing.

=== Flynn ===
Named after Julia Flynn, a local Melbourne educator and mathematician who supported women's education and became the first female Chief Inspector of Schools.

=== Mackillop ===
Named after Mary Mackillop, the first Australian saint and an educator who established schools and institutions in order to educate the poor.

== See also ==
- List of schools in Victoria, Australia
- Victorian Certificate of Education
