= Notting Hill, Victoria =

Notting Hill
- Suburb
- Interactive map of Notting Hill
- Coordinates: 37°54′15″S 145°8′30″E
- Country: Australia
- State: Victoria
- City: Melbourne
- LGA: City of Monash
- Location: 19 km (12 mi) from Melbourne

Government
  - State electorate: Oakleigh
  - Federal division: Hotham

Area
  - Total: 0.8 km^{2} (0.31 sq mi)

Population
  - Total: 2,895 (2021 census)
  - Density: 3,620/km^{2} (9,400/sq mi)
- Postcode: 3168
Suburbs around Notting Hill
Mount Waverley	Mount Waverley	Glen Waverley
Oakleigh East	Notting Hill	Mulgrave
Clayton	Clayton	Mulgrave

Notting Hill is a suburb in Melbourne, Victoria, Australia, 19 km south-east of Melbourne's Central Business District, located within the City of Monash local government area. Notting Hill recorded a population of 2,895 at the 2021 census.

== History ==
Since ancient times, the Woi Wurrung occupied an area which extended from the Werribee River in the south west, Mount Macedon in the north west, Mount William in the Great Dividing Range to the north and across to Mount Baw Baw in the east. The Wurundjeri and the Boonwurrung are acknowledged as the traditional owners and custodians of the land.

The centre of the original township of Notting Hill is on Ferntree Gully Road. The area is more a plateau than a hill, and is the site of two local water storages. A European settler, Thomas Wilkinson, is generally accepted as giving the area its name because of his association with Notting Hill in London. He was a carrier between Oakleigh and Ferntree Gully and in the late 1870s opened a refreshment stop at Notting Hill, 4 km. from Oakleigh.

Notting Hill Post Office opened on 4 April 1887 and closed in 1975.

Ferntree Gully Road was the main thoroughfare between Mulgrave Shire and Oakleigh, and at the beginning of the 20th century there were a large number of farms at Notting Hill. In 1920, there were dairy and poultry farms and market gardens, and the families agitated for a school which was finally opened in 1927. The school had an active Young Farmers' Club with livestock kept in the school grounds, and in 1937 was judged Victoria's best Young Farmers' Club. Notting Hill Primary School was closed in the mid 1970s with Students transferred to the newly built Monash Primary School. The shire transferred its offices from Oakleigh to Notting Hill in 1920, where they remained until 1955 when the growing area of Glen Waverley was the site chosen for larger offices.

The residential area of Notting Hill (formerly Clayton North) consists of some 700 houses, bordered to the north and west by Ferntree Gully and Blackburn Roads, and to the south and east by factories. The development, Westerfield Estate, was built by AVJennings as their first 'planned suburb', with no through roads, and easy pedestrian access to shops and schools. The first houses went up in the late 1950s. The small shopping strip on Westerfield Drive originally consisted of a Milk Bar, Butcher, small Supermarket, Green Grocer, Doctor, Hairdresser and Chemist. As of 2012, only the Milk Bar remains, the remaining shopfronts are now small business offices.

Monash High School (later Secondary College) was originally opened in 1965 on the grounds of Notting Hill Primary School, moving to a permanent location at the corner of Duerdin and Nantilla Road. The Community funded Westerfield Kindergarten was built from a plan created by Bob Fuller, an architect who lived in Risdon Drive with his family. It opened in the late 1960s. Monash Primary School was constructed in mid 1970s to replace the largely portable classroom Notting Hill Primary School. 1960 saw building commence at Monash University (est. 1958) which is situated at the southern boundary of Notting Hill. In the 1970s, the Rusden Teachers College (later a Campus of Deakin University) was built on the eastern boundary of Notting Hill.

== Present ==
The Notting Hill Hotel remains a prominent landmark, being established in 1891; it is frequented by nearby university students and locals of Notting Hill. The owner, Kath Byer, ran the establishment until her death on 15 November 2010 and did so since 1936 when she bought the business with her husband Sidney (Lofty) Byer. Much of Notting Hill is occupied by industrial premises, a large drive-in hardware superstore and the Monash Business Park.

Today Notting Hill is a busy suburb located between Clayton and Mount Waverley. The heart of the suburb is the residential estate. The community here has been renewed in recent years by the arrival of many young families and students. A comparison of the 2001 and 2006 Census returns for Notting Hill shows a rapid increase in the young adult population, and an increasingly diverse population in ethnic terms. Residents have been brought together as a community by their collective opposition to the closure of all of the educational facilities in and around the estate: the Rusden campus in 2002, followed by the kindergarten in 2004, and then both state schools in 2005 and 2006. Residents formed the Notting Hill Community Association to fight the closures of these institutions and the ugly developments proposed to replace them. They have won several battles, but the struggle continues. Monash City Council has responded to the Association's concerns for loss of local facilities by refurbishing the kindergarten site for use by the community. The Notting Hill Neighbourhood House was opened by the Governor of Victoria, Professor David de Kretser, on Saturday 28 July 2007.

== Industry ==
- The Natural Confectionery Company, which has been making lollies and sweets for over 60 years, is based in Notting Hill.
- Musashi Foods also has its headquarters in the area.
- Tomax Logistics, an international freight and customs business which has been in operation since 1987, has its global headquarters in Notting Hill.
- Optiscan Imaging is based in Notting Hill. It focuses on research and development of optical products for medical use.
- Carrier, Carrier Corporation is a brand of the UTC Climate, Controls & Security division, based in Palm Beach Gardens, Florida, and UTC Notting Hill focuses on Fire & Safety Products.

== See also ==
- City of Waverley – Notting Hill was previously within this former local government area.
