= Mount Waverley, Victoria =

Mount Waverley
- Suburb
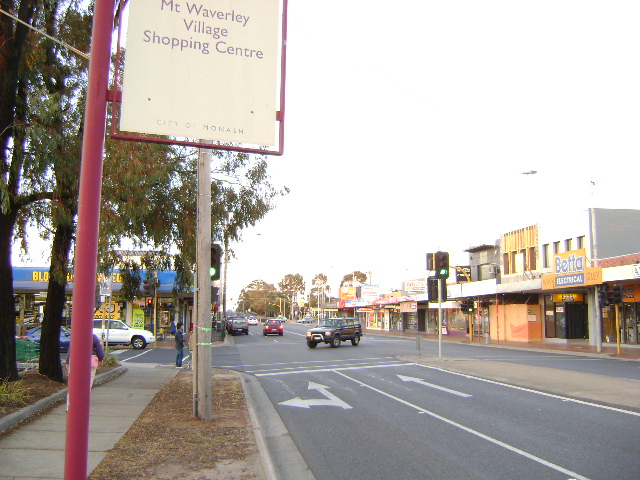
- Mount Waverley Village Shopping Centre in 2008, looking north along Stephensons Road

- Interactive map of Mount Waverley
- Coordinates: 37.877°S 145.131°E
- Country: Australia
- State: Victoria
- City: Melbourne
- LGA: City of Monash
- Location: 16 km (9.9 mi) from Melbourne

Government
  - State electorates: Ashwood; Oakleigh
  - Federal divisions: Chisholm; Hotham

Area
  - Total: 15.9 km^{2} (6.1 sq mi)

Population
  - Total: 35,340 (SAL 2021)
- Postcode: 3149
Suburbs around Mount Waverley
Ashwood	Burwood	Burwood East
Chadstone	Mount Waverley	Glen Waverley
Oakleigh East	Clayton	Notting Hill

Mount Waverley is a suburb in Melbourne, Victoria, Australia, 16 km (9.9 mi) south-east of Melbourne's Central Business District, located within the City of Monash local government area. Mount Waverley recorded a population of 35,340 at the 2021 census.

It is 16 km from Melbourne at its closest point. Mount Waverley railway station, located in the main shopping precinct, is located 17.8 km from Flinders Street railway station.

== Geography ==
Mount Waverley is a large suburb, rectangular in shape, bounded by Highbury Road in the north, Ferntree Gully Road in the south, Huntingdale Road in the west, and Blackburn Road in the east. At the centre of the suburb is Mount Waverley Village Shopping Centre, and in the south-east is Pinewood Shopping Centre.

== History ==
The Mount Waverley area, then part of the Parish of Mulgrave, was divided by straight roads running north–south and east–west, each exactly one mile apart, by Assistant Surveyor Eugene Bellairs, in 1853.

Less than six months later, in 1854, Dr James Silverman, a Russian emigrant who had gained medical qualifications in England, created a privately surveyed township from 160 acres of land he had purchased south-east of the corner of High Street Road and Stephensons Road, the lots being laid out by a surveyor named Newson. The Waverley Historical Society speculates that Silverman (or Newson) was interested in Sir Walter Scott's Waverley novels, after which the area is named, and also in the court of Charles II of England – the House of Stuart being featured in the Waverley novels. Several streets originally existing in the township were named after Charles and members of his court, which include streets such as Charles Street, Stewart Street, St Albans Street (named after Charles Beauclerk, Duke of St Albans), Gwynne Street (named after Nell Gwynne), Portsmouth Street (after Louise de Kérouaille, Duchess of Portsmouth, Cleveland Street and Castlemaine Street (after Barbara Villiers, Countess of Castlemaine and Duchess of Cleveland), Grafton Street (after Henry, Duke of Grafton) and Monmouth Street (after James, Duke of Monmouth).

The first house lot in the Waverley township was sold in 1854. While the township was not successful, the name Waverley was re-used in the suburb names, Mount Waverley and Glen Waverley.

Mount Waverley is famous for its heritage streets which date from the 1930s. Due to the onset of the Great Depression, the building of houses on the suburb's earliest estates did not commence in earnest until the early 1950s. According to Lachlan Bath, president of the Ashburton Historical Society, the suburb's streets had been laid down, but no houses were built; merely a row of "cardboard boxes" housed the first few residents who had migrated east from the "slums of Ashburton to enjoy a better standard of living", only to be bitterly disappointed with the estate agents who promised milk and honey but instead delivered a mosquito infested swamp. However, the Ashburton immigrants, while disappointed, all agreed that the "swamp" was a major step up from their former homes. The Mount Waverley Post Office opened on 9 October 1905. Post Offices at Mount Waverley North (opened 1959 closed 1983), Mount Waverley South (opened 1968 closed 1973), and Mount Waverley West (opened 1964 closed 1977) chart the wider residential development of the suburb.

=== Glen Alvie Estate ===
Close to Mount Waverley Village are the suburb's first streets, once designed for country estate living. Sherwood Park was part of the Glen Alvie estate that sought to form country club type living to Waverley. Land was acquired – 25 acres were bought from Mr Jack Lechte in 1928, and some from Mr Cornell, as well as a large parcel of land from Mr F. Closter – in all about 50 acres. This fertile land had been dairy farm – Ayrshire-Jersey cross cows, with some pigs, a plum and apple orchard, and stock feed crops – canola, maize and lucerne (alfalfa). Glen Alvie Estates Limited allocated five of the fifty acres for recreation facilities. There was to be a club house, six tennis courts, a bowling green, a croquet lawn, a mashee lawn, and a large swimming pool. These were to be laid out adjacent to Sherwood Park, a huge central area, lined with date palms that are still seen today. Large houses around the periphery were to be built, and one-way roads would be constructed to prevent traffic problems; and also elsewhere in the estate – tucked between the large unfenced building sites and gardens to give a sense of living on a country estate. A golf course had been established nearby by 1930; St John's Wood Golf Links, (now Riversdale Golf Club), the gardens of which were designed by Edna Walling, and a school was also nearby; Mount Waverley Primary School. This was to be garden suburb living.

The suburb's original streets, including Park Lane, Virginia Street and Sherwood Road, were built of concrete, not the less expensive asphalt. Council intended to charge an extra rate to residents of the estate to cover the huge loan of building these concrete streets. The surface is still the same as it was in the 1930s, with only minor maintenance over the decades. Residential development did not resurge until the 1950s. In early 2008, a new smoother asphalt surface was finally laid along the strip of Stephensons Road between Waverley Road and Mount Waverley Village shopping centre.

Stephensons Road (which is the sixth name change of a long continuous road beginning at the intersection of Palm Beach Drive & Old Wells Road, Patterson Lakes and beginning as state route 23 in Chelsea Heights) is the main road of Mount Waverley that runs straight through the middle of the suburb. The name Stephensons Road is solely in the suburb of Mount Waverley, which is between its southern boundary Ferntree Gully Road (continuing as Clayton Road) to its northern boundary Highbury Road (continuing as Middleborough Road).

== Today ==
One of the highest points in Mount Waverley is the reservoir on High Street Road. The natural land surrounding this landmark is over 138–150 metres above sea level. Construction of the reservoir began in 1927.

The waterways in the suburb are Damper Creek in the north, and Scotchmans Creek, in the south. Significant parks within Mount Waverley include Valley Reserve, Damper Creek Reserve, and Federal Reserve. All reserves contain significant areas of remnant native bushland. Significant wetland areas in Mount Waverley are found within Valley Reserve and in the Scotchmans Creek valley.

The popular Melbourne Street Directory Melway was first produced in a garage in Mount Waverley in 1966. It is now published from premises in Ricketts Road in Mount Waverley.

Over many years, Mount Waverley has held an annual Christmas Carols event, which has featured many local performers. The large trader-supported event ceased to run from 2010, with the City of Monash preferring to put its main support behind the annual Carols by Candlelight in Jells Park.

Since 2012 a smaller-scale event called Carols in the Village has been organised by the Mount Waverley Council of Churches, with mostly local performers.

Mount Waverley has a sizeable business park and office corridor on Ferntree Gully Road and Blackburn Roads, and the suburb is the home to a sizeable number of electronics and IT companies. The south-eastern section of the suburb is part of the Monash Technology Precinct, a hub of technology industries and research institutions in Melbourne.

The Mount Waverley branch of Monash Public Library Service is located on the north side of Mount Waverley station in Miller Crescent. Waverley Private Hospital is located on Blackburn Road and has served the community since 1972.

== Demographics ==
Mount Waverley is a particularly large suburb, with 35,340 people in 2021. In recent years, the suburb has been a popular destination for immigrants from Asia, particularly China and India. There is also a large Greek and Italian community. The suburb hosts Victoria's third largest Mandarin speaking and fourth largest Greek and Korean speaking population. 26.7% of the suburb identified as Chinese in the 2021 Census, making it one of the highest concentrations of Chinese in Melbourne.

== Education ==
Primary Schools

Public

- Mount Waverley Primary School
- Mount Waverley North Primary School
- Essex Heights Primary School
- Mount Waverley Heights Primary School (formerly Sussex Heights)
- Syndal South Primary School
- Pinewood Primary School

Private

- Holy Family Primary School
- Huntingtower School (Junior Campus)

Secondary Schools

Public

- Mount Waverley Secondary College

Private

- Huntingtower School
- Avila College

== Places of worship ==
There are numerous places of worship in Mount Waverley. The Holy Family Catholic Church is located on Stephensons Road and has Korean and Indonesian services. There are three Uniting churches; St Luke's, St John's and High Street Road. There is a Renewal Chinese Christian Church at the site of St Luke's Uniting Church. There are two Anglican churches; St Stephen and Mary's and St Philip's. St Stephen and Mary's parish church was originally built in 1865 making it the oldest church in the suburb.

The Mount Waverley Church of the Nazarene is located on Grenfell Road and has Greek services. An independent Chinese church also operates there. There is an Italian Pentecostal Church associated with the Australian Christian Churches. A Christian Science church and reading room operates on Stephensons Road. Other churches include the Melbourne Bethel Presbyterian Church (with Korean services) and the Monash Jesus' Disciples Church. There is also a Tamil Christian congregation in the suburb. Christadelphians and Jehovah's Witnesses also worship in Mount Waverley.

== Sport ==
The suburb has an Australian rules football club, the Waverley Blues Football Club of the Eastern Football League. In addition, the Ashwood Football Club of the Southern Football League is also located in the suburb.

The Mount Waverley Cricket Club was founded in 1906 and fields five senior sides playing on turf in the who play in the Victorian Sub-District Cricket Association and the Box Hill Reporter competition (Veterans grade). The club also run a full program of junior cricket which includes having a team in the VSDCA's RM Hatch competition and nine under age sides playing on turf and synthetic wickets.

Cricket is also represented by the Mount Waverley Catholic Cricket Club who compete in the Southern District & Churches Cricket League (SDCCL). The club's home ground is Mayfield Park which has 2 training nets and is a synthetic wicket. The club has many junior teams ranging from under 11's all the way through to under 17's. In season 2008–2009 the senior team won their most recent SDCCL Menzies Shield, which is the competitions highest grade. This is a feat the club has managed 3 times since joining the SDCCL.

Golfers play at the course of the Riversdale Golf Club on High Street Mount Waverley.

== Transport ==
Mount Waverley has two train stations, Mount Waverley, located on Stephensons Road, 17.8 km from Flinders Street; and Jordanville, located on Huntingdale Road, 16.4 km from Flinders Street on the Glen Waverley line. Numerous bus services operate in the suburb.

== Notable people ==
- Redmond Barry
- James Beresford
- John Blackman
- Peter Dupas
- Adam Elliot
- Flea
- Peter Handscomb
- Jeff Hogg
- Chris Knights
- Scott Maginness
- Mary from Mary and Max
- Alex Morgan
- Shona Morgan
- Dirk Nannes
- Tracy Pew
- Marina Prior
- Peter Rowsthorn
- Mark Rowsthorn
- Graeme Strachan
- Peter Tatchell
- Bret Thornton

== Environmental issues ==
From 2015 to 2019, Concrete Concepts Pty Ltd, a construction company, polluted a site next to Syndal South Primary School. The company had been hired to build a soccer pitch and dumped more than 100 loads of waste contaminated with asbestos and other waste. EPA Victoria took the company to court for pollution and illegal dumping of industrial waste. The Court fined the company $285,000 as part of an aggregate order.

== See also ==
- City of Waverley – Mount Waverley was previously within this former local government area.
- Mount Waverley railway station
- Jordanville railway station
- Electoral district of Mount Waverley

== Gallery ==
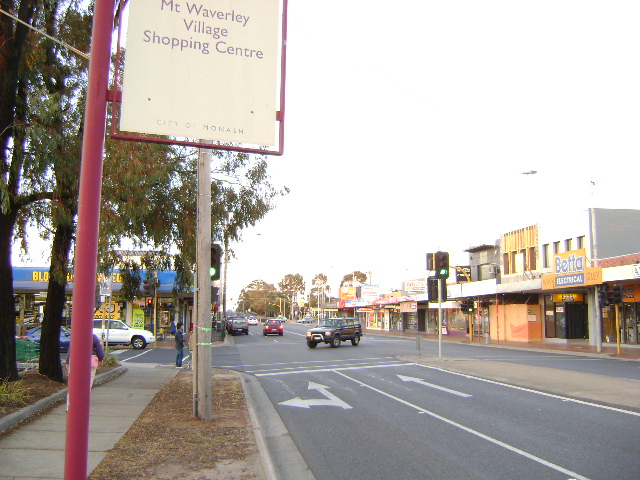
Mount Waverley Village Shopping Centre in 2008, looking north along Stephensons Road

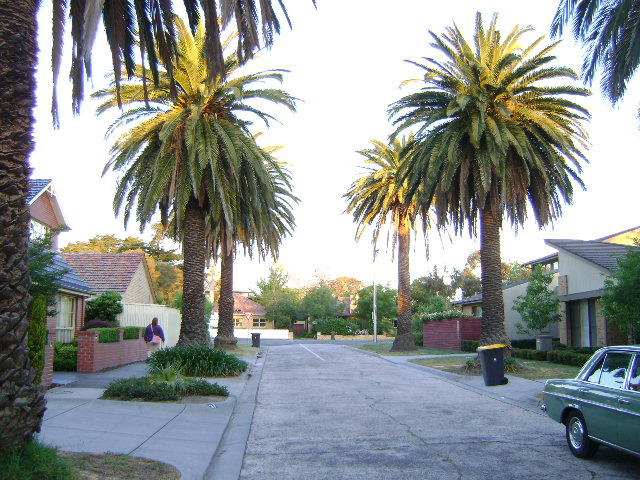
Date palms in Sherwood Road in 2008, looking east

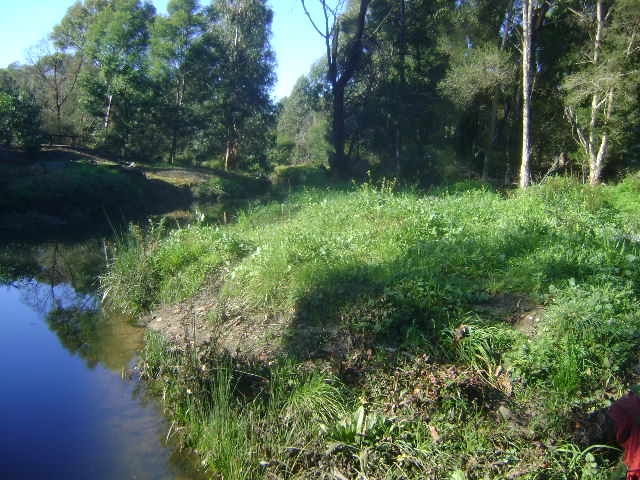
Native bushland along Scotchmans Creek
