= Clayton, Victoria =

Clayton
- Suburb
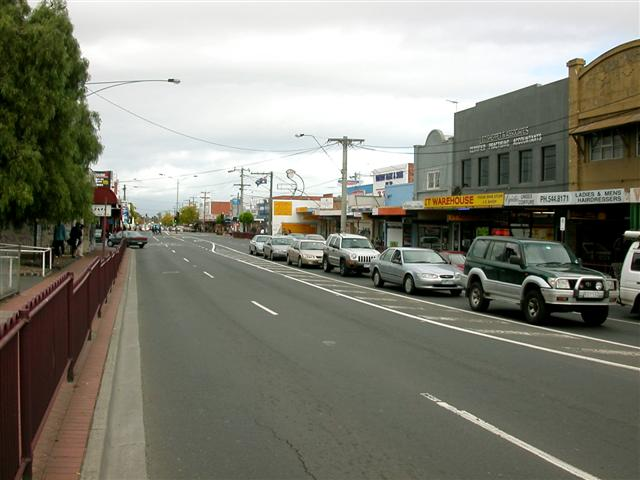
- Clayton Road Shopping Precinct

- Interactive map of Clayton
- Coordinates: 37.915°S 145.130°E
- Country: Australia
- State: Victoria
- City: Melbourne
- LGA: City of Monash
- Location: 18 km (11 mi) from Melbourne

Government
  - State electorates: Clarinda; Oakleigh
  - Federal division: Hotham

Area
  - Total: 7.7 km^{2} (3.0 sq mi)

Population
  - Total: 18,988 (2021 census)
  - Density: 2,466/km^{2} (6,390/sq mi)
- Postcode: 3168
Suburbs around Clayton
Oakleigh East	Mount Waverley	Notting Hill
Oakleigh South	Clayton	Mulgrave
Clarinda	Clayton South	Springvale

Clayton is a suburb in Melbourne, Victoria, Australia, 18 km south-east of Melbourne's Central Business District, located within the City of Monash local government area. Clayton recorded a population of 18,988 at the 2021 census.

== Overview ==
The main focus for the suburb of Clayton is the shopping strip that runs along Clayton Road. The local railway station, situated at the northern end of the shopping strip bears the name Clayton railway station.

== Demographics ==
In the 2021 census, there were 18,988 people in Clayton, down from 19,358 in 2016. The population is younger and more male-skewed than the average for the state; the median age is 28 compared to 38 for Victoria, while men and women make up 53.7% and 46.3% of the population respectively, compared to 49.2% and 50.8% for Victoria. The age curve is skewed, with 20-24 year olds and 25-29 year olds each making up approximately one-fifth of the population; for the state as a whole, 6.3% and 7.3% of the population are aged 20–24 and 25-29 respectively.

At the time the census was taken, 27.2% of the population reported being born in Australia, compared to 65% of the Victorian population and 66.9% of the Australian population. 16.4% reported their country of birth as India, while 14.7% reported it as mainland China. In the 2016 census, 24.7% of Clayton reported being born in Australia, while 27.4% reported being born in China and 10% in India. Clayton was at the time one of only two areas in Greater Melbourne where Australia was not the most common place of birth, with the Melbourne central business district being the other. 32.2% of the population in the 2021 census reported their ethnicity as Chinese, while 9.3% reported it as Indian, 8.6% as English, 7% as Australian, and 4.5% as Greek. Clayton's Chinese, Indian, and Greek populations are higher than the Victorian and Australian average (4.7%, 2.7%, 2.2% for Victoria; 3.9%, 2%, 1.3% for Australia), while its Anglo-Celtic Australian population is lower. A larger share of the population of Clayton than of the state or country report speaking a non-English language at home. 25.2% in 2016 and 28.3% in 2021 reported English as the only language they spoke at home. In both years, the main non-English language spoken was Mandarin; other prominent languages in 2021 were Greek, Hindi, Gujarati, and Cantonese.

Large shares of the Clayton population report being higher education students: 71.7% in 2016 and 54.4% in 2021. Amongst the suburb's population as a whole, 34% in 2016 and 42.3% in 2021 reported having a bachelor's degree or higher. The proportion holding such a degree for Victoria as a whole in those years was 24.3% and 29.2% respectively. A larger share of Clayton residents reported being employed as "professionals" than the general Australian population (28.3% vs 24%), but fewer reported being "managers" (6.4% vs 13.7%). The median weekly incomes for individuals and households were AU$594 and AU$1,494 respectively, compared to AU$803 and AU$1,759 for Victoria.

39.4% of Clayton residents in 2021 reported having no religious affiliation, and another 8.9% did not answer the question. Hinduism and Buddhism were more common compared to the general population; 7.3% and 6.7% of Clayton residents reported being Hindu or Buddhist respectively, compared to 2.3% and 3.1% of Victorians, and 1.9% and 2.4% of Australians. 13.9% reported being Catholic, compared to 23.2% of Victorians.

== History ==
=== European history ===
19th century

The area was first occupied for farming in the 1850s and was originally named after a property, "Clayton Vale", owned by lawyer John Hughes Clayton in the 1860s. A township was originally gazetted on Dandenong Road and in 1862 a primary school was opened at the corner of Dandenong Road and Clayton Road, to serve the whole of the Clayton district. This school changed its name to Clayton North Primary School in 1954.

The construction of the railway to Dandenong and Gippsland approximately 1 kilometre (0.62 mi) south of Dandenong Road in 1878 prompted the start of a second township where the line crossed Clayton Road. A post office opened on 18 November 1887 as Clayton's Road Railway Station and was renamed Clayton in 1891.

20th century

Clayton's rural lands and relative proximity to Melbourne attracted two institutions at the turn of the century: the Talbot Colony for Epileptics on land later occupied by Monash University, and a Women's Convalescent Home. Apart from that, in 1900 the community consisted of farms, three hotels, two churches, a tennis court and a few shops. Market gardens, fruit growing and a municipal abattoir were the leading industries.

The 1960s saw the rapid disappearance of market gardens as urbanisation and industry advanced. At the western edge of Clayton the Oakleigh High School had been opened in 1955 and a second primary school was opened next year at Clayton South. Clayton East Post Office opened in 1958 (and closed 1979).

Monash University, Melbourne's second metropolitan university, was opened at Clayton in 1961, and has since grown to become Australia's largest university. Primary schools at Westall and Clayton West opened in 1961 and 1962, and high schools at Westall and Monash (Clayton North) in 1963 and 1965. In the early 1960s Clayton Technical School opened at the northern end of Browns Road. and its peak attendance was over 1,000 male students. It closed in the 1980s and remnants of the site now form part of Fregon reserve. Corpus Christi College, a former Roman Catholic seminary was established in 1971, operated until 1999, and the site now serves as a conference centre.

Numerous factories opened after World War II, including Volkswagen (later became the Datsun/Nissan plant), Cheseborough, Wilke Printing, Robert Bosch GmbH and Repco. Clayton South and Westall are closer to the sandbelt areas, with the Spring Valley Golf Club, The Grange Reserve and Heatherton Park. Sanitary landfill sites occupy former sand quarries.

The suburb formed part of the now defunct City of Oakleigh local council and, in 1995, the municipality became part of the south-western corner within the City of Monash.

=== Heritage listings ===
The following places in Clayton are listed on the Victorian Heritage Register:

- Clayton North Primary School, at 1714 Dandenong Road, being the 1909 main brick building
- Clayton railway station, at 274 Clayton Road, being elements of the station completed in 1880 and its structures from 1891 to 1915
- The Religious Centre of Monash University, at Building 9 of the university's Clayton campus

== Public Library and Clayton Community Centre ==
A large new building at the corner of Cooke Street and Centre Road was opened in April 2008. It houses the Clayton branch of the Monash Public Library Service, a swimming pool, gym, counselling services, health and child care services, theatre and meeting rooms.

== Science, technology and research ==
Clayton is one of the largest centres of science, technology and research in Australia. It is located in Melbourne's south-eastern suburbs, which contains the highest density of high technology industries in Victoria.

Some of the science and technology institutions located in Clayton include:

- Monash University
- Monash Medical Centre
- Australian Synchrotron
- Australian Stem Cell Centre
- Monash Science Technology Research and Innovation Precinct
- CSIRO
- Bosch
- Telstra Research Laboratories
- Australian Regenerative Medicine Institute
- Monash University Accident Research Centre
- Monash Centre for Synchrotron Science
- Centre for Human Bioethics
- Melbourne Centre for Nanofabrication
- John Monash Science School

== Business ==
Clayton is also a hub for both local and international businesses, with a long history of local manufacturing.

Some of the current and former manufacturers located in Clayton include:

- GMSV
- Bosch
- PPG
- Unidrive (now demolished)

== Schools ==
- Clayton North Primary School
- St Peter's Primary School
- John Monash Science School
- Monash Tech School

== Sport ==
The suburb is home to Clayton Football Club, currently competing in the Southern Football League and located at Meade Reserve, Haughton Rd, Clayton. The club was formed in 1908 and after commencing at a ground on the corner of Crawford Rd & Centre Rd, Clarinda, moved to its current ground in 1919. Clayton District Cricket Club also plays at Meade Reserve, Haughton Rd, Clayton. The club was founded as 'Clayton Vale Cricket Club' in 1924 with its original ground in Wordsworth Ave, Westall. The Club moved to Namatjira Park, Springs Rd, Clayton South in 1953 before settling at Meade Reserve in 1977.

The suburb is home to Waverley Wanderers Soccer Club of Football Federation Victoria and also Waverley Oakleigh Panthers of Victoria Rugby League.

The suburb is home to Clayton Bowls Club, located in Springs Rd, Clayton South.

== Places of worship ==
- Regeneration Church Monash
- St. Andrews Presbyterian Church
- Clayton Church of Christ
- All Saints Anglican Church
- St. Peters Catholic Church
- Clayton Christadelphians
- Monash Mosque

== See also ==
- City of Oakleigh – Clayton was previously within this former local government area.
- Clayton railway station
- Glen Waverley
- Springvale

== Gallery ==
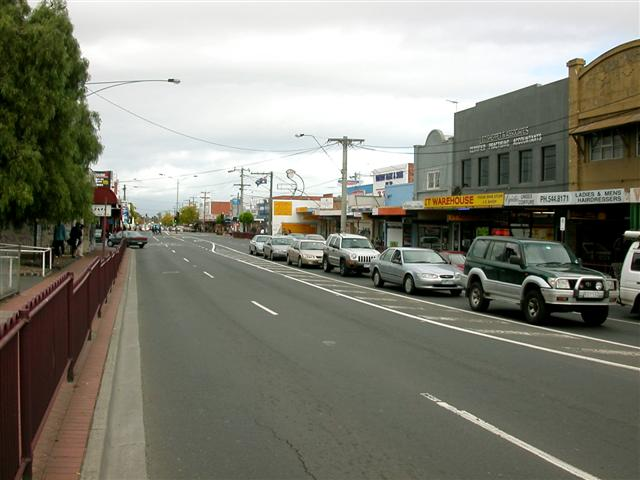
Clayton Road Shopping Precinct

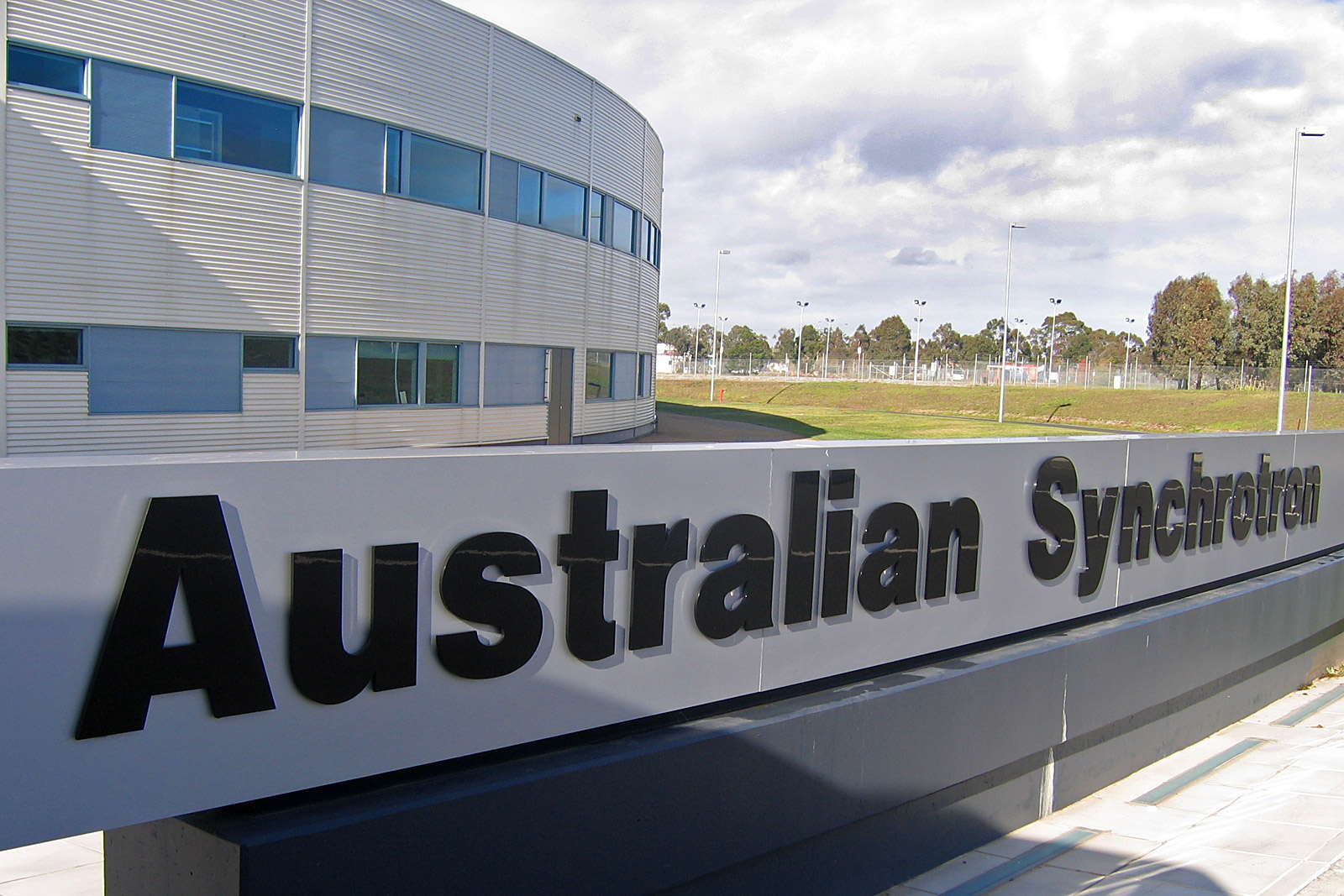
The exterior of the Australian Synchrotron facility

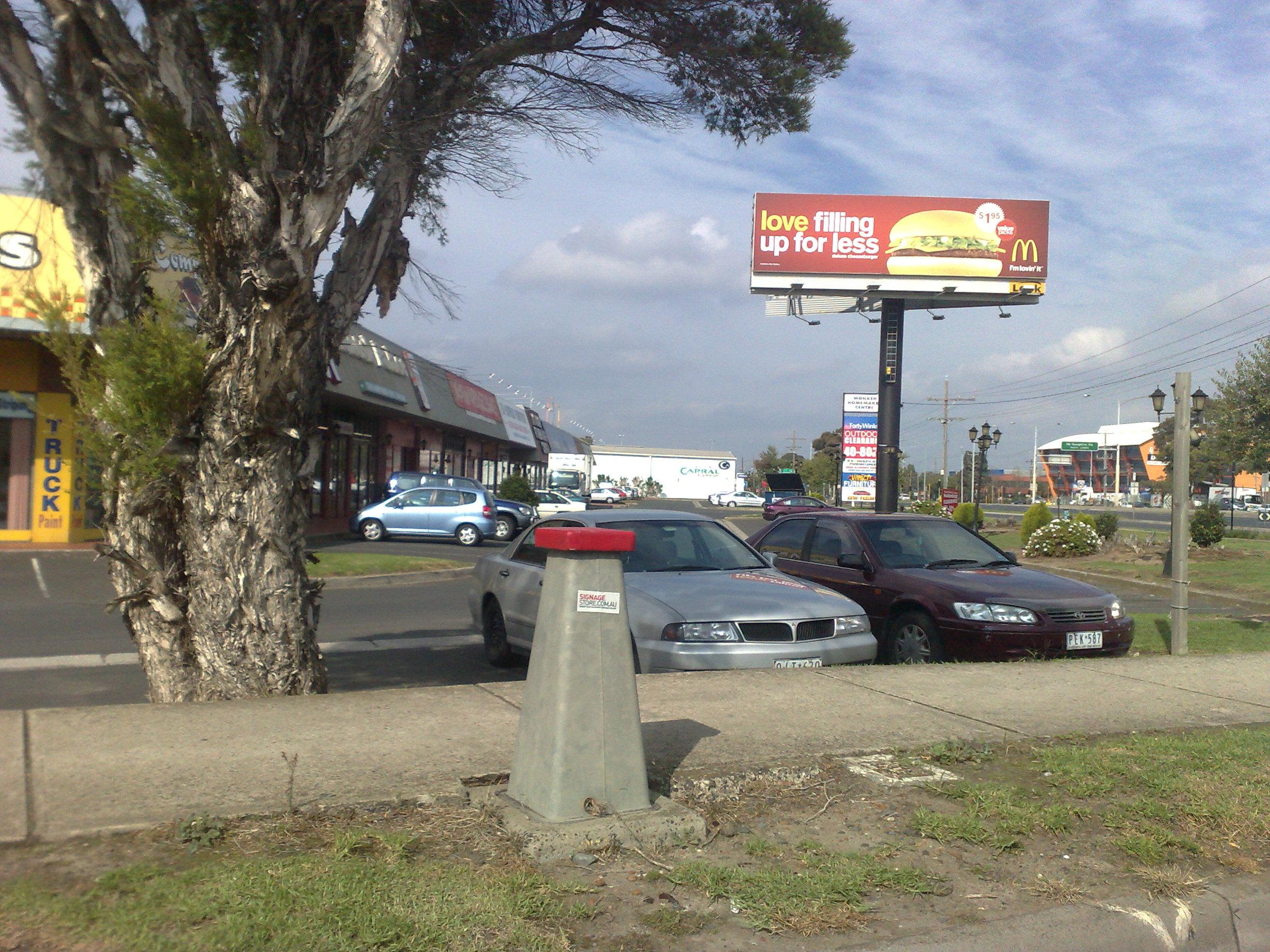
The Monash Homemaker centre in Clayton on Blackburn Road-Princes Hwy

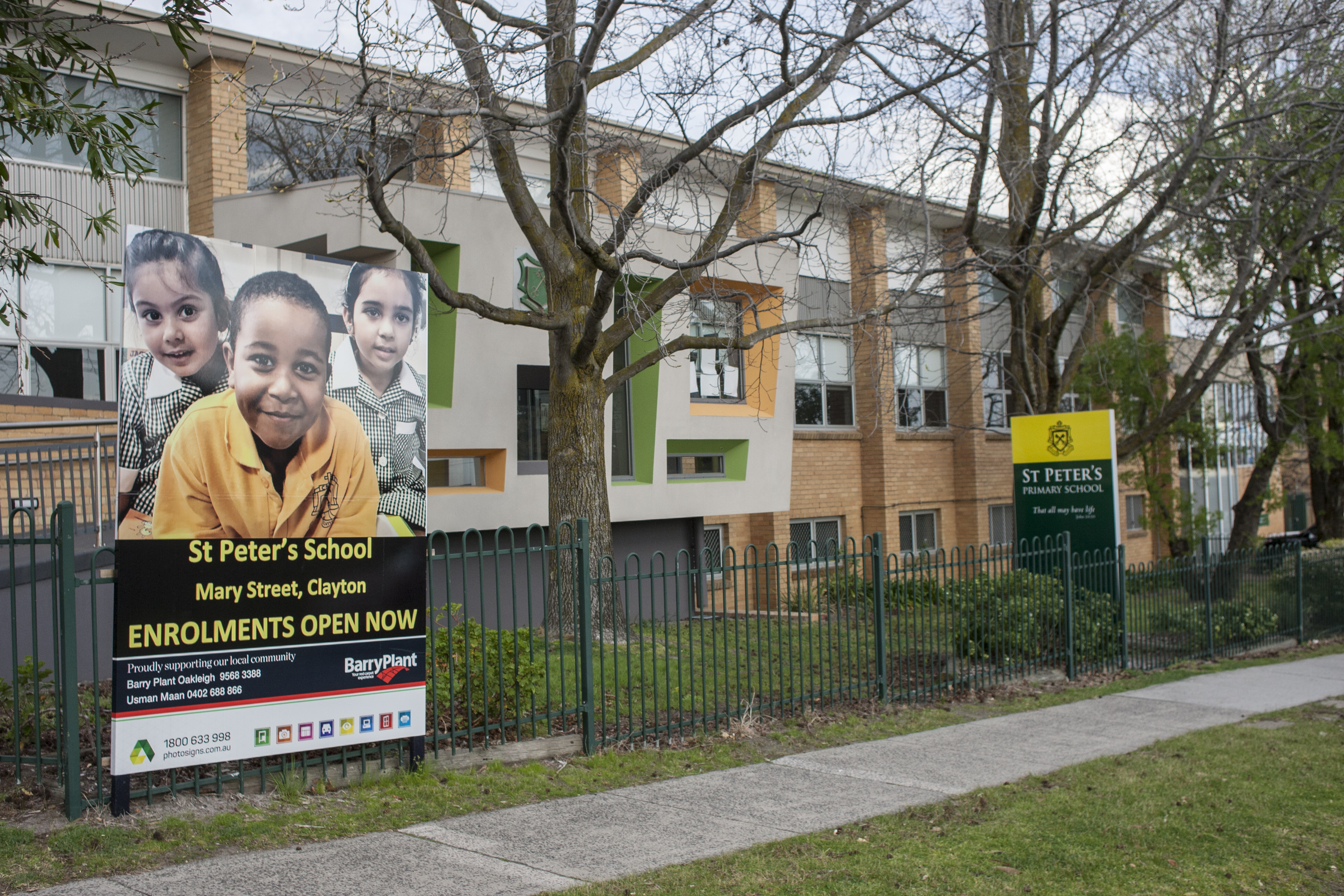
St Peter's Primary School, Mary St.

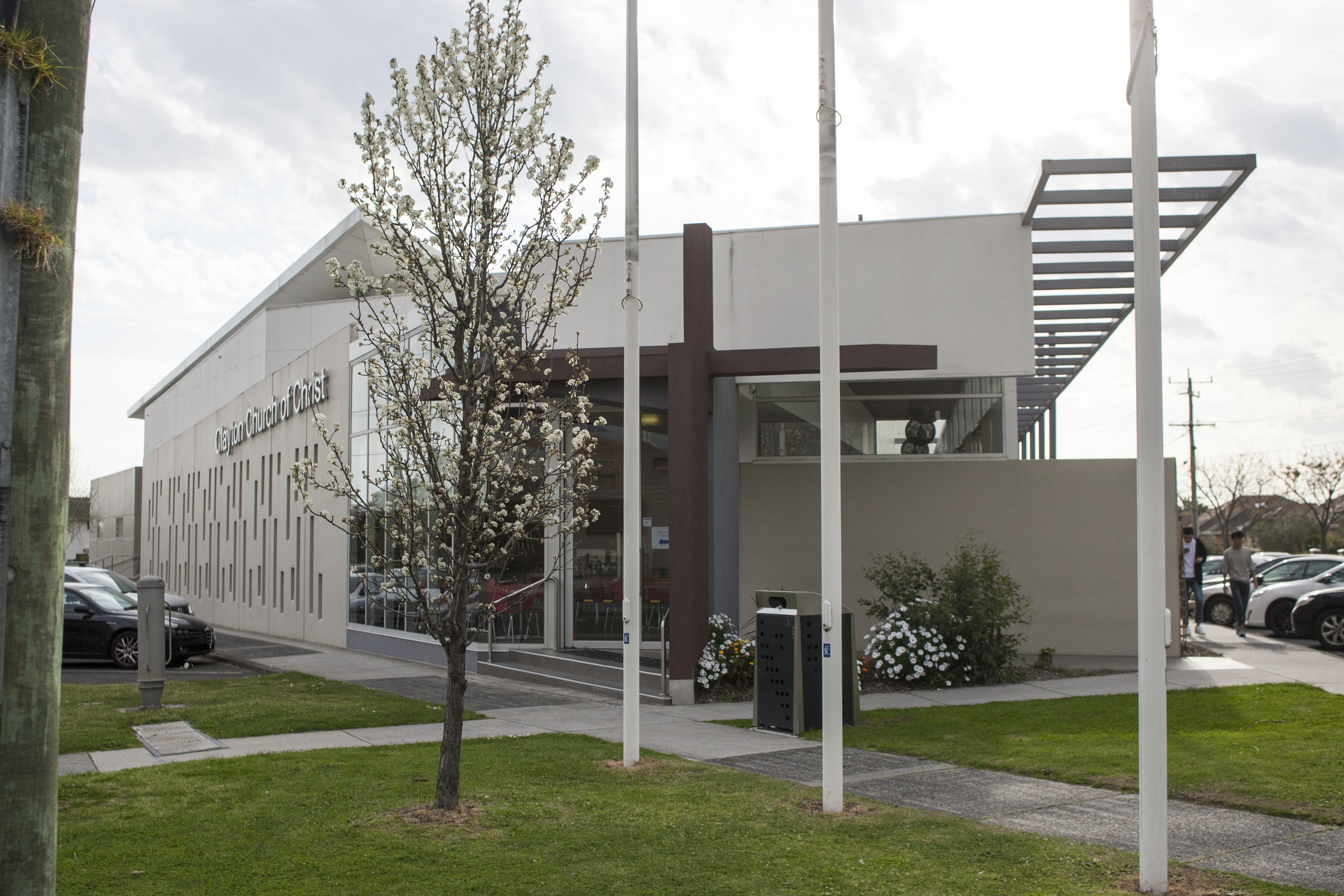
Clayton Church of Christ on Burton Ave

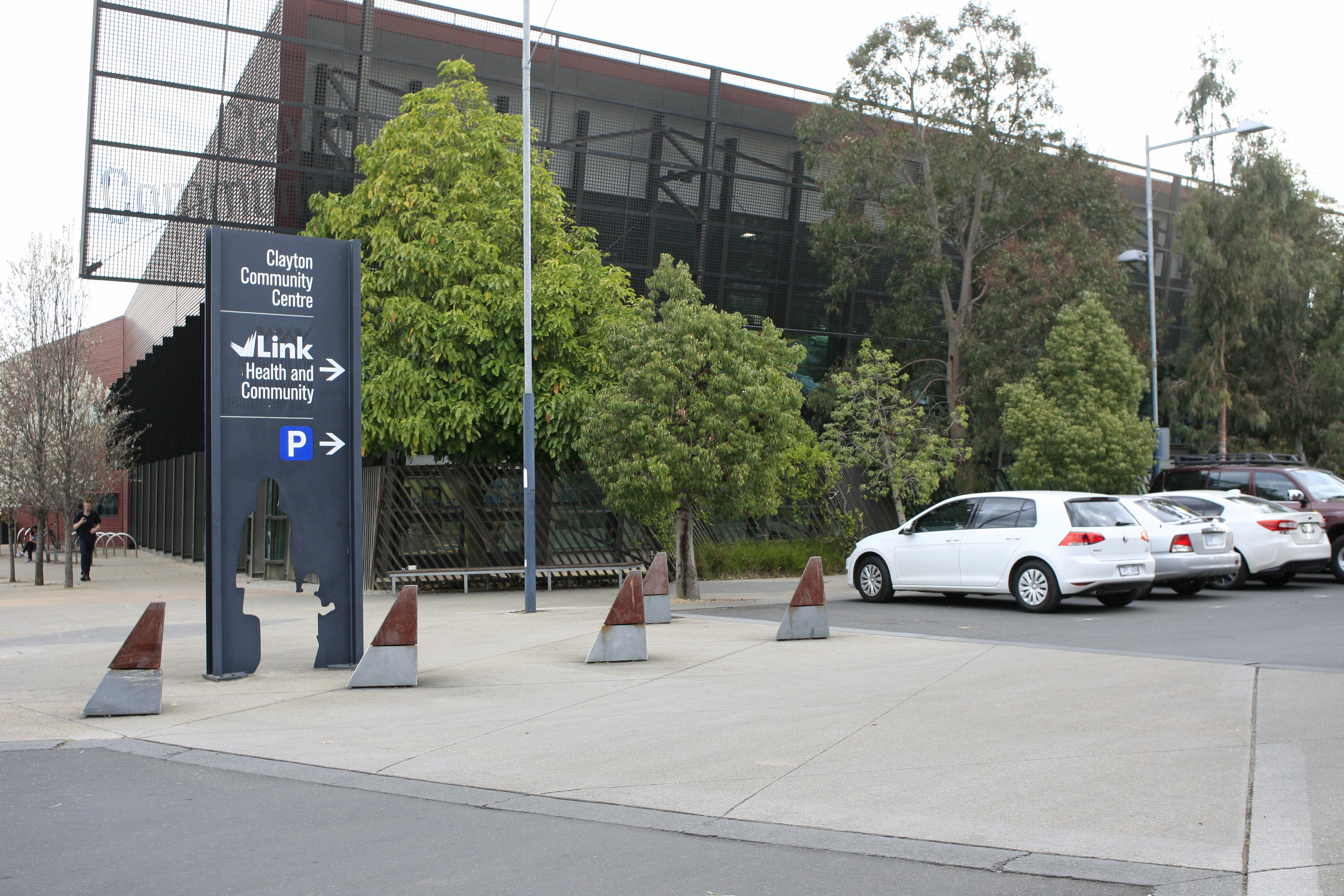
Clayton Community Centre, Cooke St
