= Oakleigh Motel =

Former motel in Melbourne, Victoria, Australia

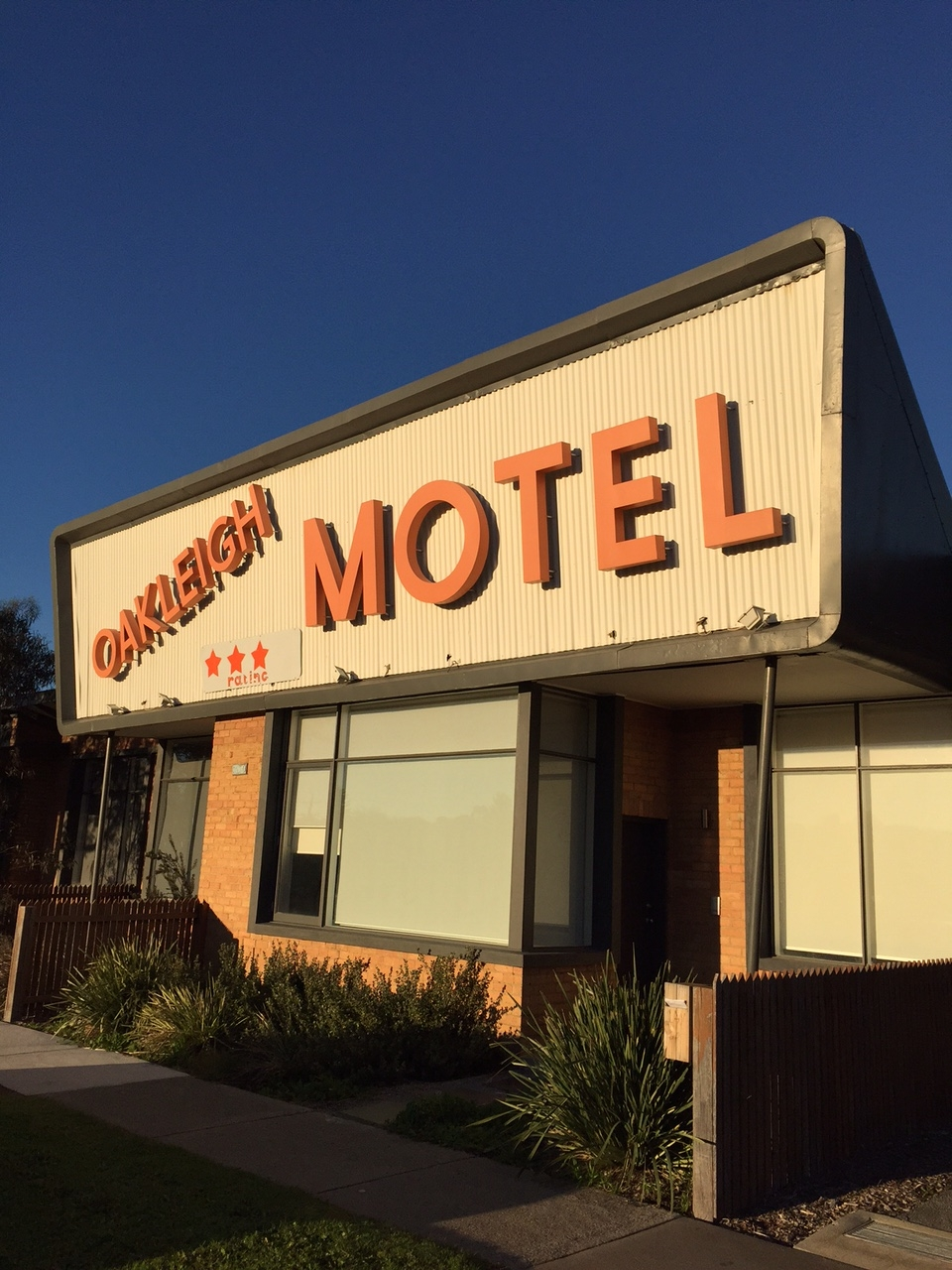
- All that remains of the motel, 2016

- Location within Melbourne
- Interactive map of the Oakleigh Motel area

General information
- Status: Built; repurposed
- Type: Motel
- Architectural style: Modernist Googie
- Location: Oakleigh East, Melbourne, Victoria, 1650 Dandenong Rd (or Old Princes Highway), Australia
- Coordinates: 37°54′27″S 145°06′55″E
- Year built: 1956–1957
- Completed: 1957; 69 years ago
- Renovated: 2010 (facade retained)
- Client: Cyril Lewis

Technical details
- Material: Bricks, steel, glass, fibreglass

Design and construction
- Architect: James Miller
- Main contractor: James Miller
- Known for: Victoria's first motel

Victorian Heritage Register
- Official name: Oakleigh Motel
- Type: Registered place
- Designated: 7 May 2009
- Reference no.: H2193
- Heritage overlay no.: HO23
- Category: Recreation and Entertainment

The Oakleigh Motel is a heritage-listed former motel located at 1650 Dandenong Road, also known as the Old Princes Highway, in Oakleigh East, an eastern suburb of Melbourne, in Victoria, Australia. Completed in 1957, it was first motel built in Victoria. The motel was added to the Victorian Heritage Register on 7 May 2009 in recognition of its architectural, historical and aesthetic significance.

Since repurposed as apartments, the former motel's prominent signage remains substantially intact.

== Description ==
The Oakleigh Motel was the first motel built in Victoria; designed in 1956 and opened in 1957. It was located on the Old Princes Highway, the main road into Melbourne from Gippsland, in what was the eastern outskirts of Melbourne. The site chosen was the location of the former Mulgrave Arms Hotel and was an earlier staging point for Cobb and Co.

The motel was designed by James Miller and the design was likely to have been influenced by his client, Cyril Lewis, who had travelled in the United States, staying in and inspecting many motels there. The motel was a new building type, inspired by American models, and was associated with the post-war boom in car ownership. The motel was supposed to open in time for the Melbourne Olympics, but delays in building meant that it did not open until 1957. However, it was the eastern turning point for the 1956 Olympic marathon.

The rooms provided more comfort than the old hotels and guest houses, and were self contained and private. Each room had its own bathroom and telephone, and had air conditioning, sound-proofing, wall-to-wall carpet and Venetian blinds. The single-storey nature of the room blocks and the planning of the site allowed patrons of the motel to park their car at the door of their unit.

Signage and electric lighting were closely tied to Modernist Googie post-war architecture, with businesses such as shops, motels and service stations taking full advantage of both to advertise the place and its function. The excesses of commercialism typified by the motel's signage were deplored by Robin Boyd in The Australian Ugliness (1960), but became more acceptable in the 1980s with movements such as pop art and post-modernism.

The Oakleigh Motel was a model of 1950s modernity, with its butterfly roofs, sloping window walls, sleek signage and hangar-like entrance. It retained a high degree of intactness and, until its remodelling, many external and internal features remained.

=== Redevelopment ===
Added to a non-statutory heritage list by the Victorian branch of the National Trust on 4 June 2001, plans for a contemporary renovation, proposed in 2008, were mired in controversy after the local government authority approved the development of the site prior to its listing on the Victorian Heritage Register. An amended redevelopment was completed in 2010 allowing for retention of the Googie-styled exterior signage and facade, and accommodated unsympathetic modern apartments at the rear of the site.

== See also ==
- List of hotels in Australia
- Googie architecture
- Australian non-residential architectural styles
