= Monash Centre for Synchrotron Science =

The Monash Centre for Synchrotron Science is a research institute at Monash University. It was set up to take advantage of the establishment of ANSTO's Australian Synchrotron, located at the university's Clayton Campus, Victoria, Australia. It is an interdisciplinary research centre, combining studies in areas such as biomedicine, physics, chemistry and pharmacy. Its focus is the ways in which synchrotrons can contribute to our knowledge in these areas. The founding director of the centre was Professor Rob Lewis.
