= Stuart James =

Australian politician

Mayor Stuart James

Mayor of the City of Monash
- Incumbent
- Assumed office November 2025
- Preceded by: Paul Klisaris
- In office 9 November 2021 – 14 November 2022
- Preceded by: Brian Little
- Succeeded by: Tina Samardzija
- In office 11 November 2019 – 24 October 2020
- Preceded by: Shane McCluskey
- Succeeded by: Brian Little

Councillor for the City of Monash
- Incumbent
- Assumed office 22 October 2016
- Preceded by: Bill Pontikis

Personal details
- Born: 24 September 1978 (age 48)
- Party: Labor
- Children: 4
- Education: Carey Baptist Grammar School
- Alma mater: Monash University
- Website: http://stujames.com.au

Stuart James (born 24 September 1978) is an Australian politician. He was elected as a Councillor to the City of Monash in October 2016 and was re-elected in 2020 and 2024. On 11 November 2019 he was elected as the 17th Mayor of the City of Monash and was elected Mayor again in 2021-22 and 2025-26. He is married with three daughters and a son.

In 2023, Stuart joined the Board of the Municipal Association of Victoria representing the Eastern Metropolitan region and was elected Deputy President in 2024. He sits on the Board of the Australian Local Government Association and on the Board of the Alliance for Gambling Reform. He is an active public transport advocate and was Chair of the Eastern Transport Coalition for 8 years,, sat on the Executive of the Public Transport Users Association for 7 years, on the Metropolitan Transport Forum and has written a number of transport focused op-eds.
