= Australian National Fabrication Facility =

Australian National Fabrication Facility (ANFF) has its headquarters at the Melbourne Centre for Nanofabrication in Clayton, Victoria. It is an organization that links eight corresponding university-based nodes to offer researchers with access to up to date fabrication facilities.

Each of the eight nodes provide capability in a specific range of areas to meet researchers’ different fabrication needs. The nodes consists of different partners as listed below.

Victorian Node (Melbourne Centre for Nanofabrication):

- Monash University
- CSIRO
- Deakin University
- La Trobe University
- University of Melbourne
- Swinburne University of Technology
- RMIT University
- Victoria University

ACT Node:

- Australian National University

Queensland Node:

- University of Queensland
- Griffith University

NSW Node:

- University of New South Wales

South Australia Node:

- University of South Australia
- Flinders University

OptoFab Node:

- Macquarie University
- University of Adelaide
- University of Sydney

Western Australian Node:

- University of Western Australia

Materials Node:

- University of Wollongong
- University of Newcastle
