= John Monash Science School =

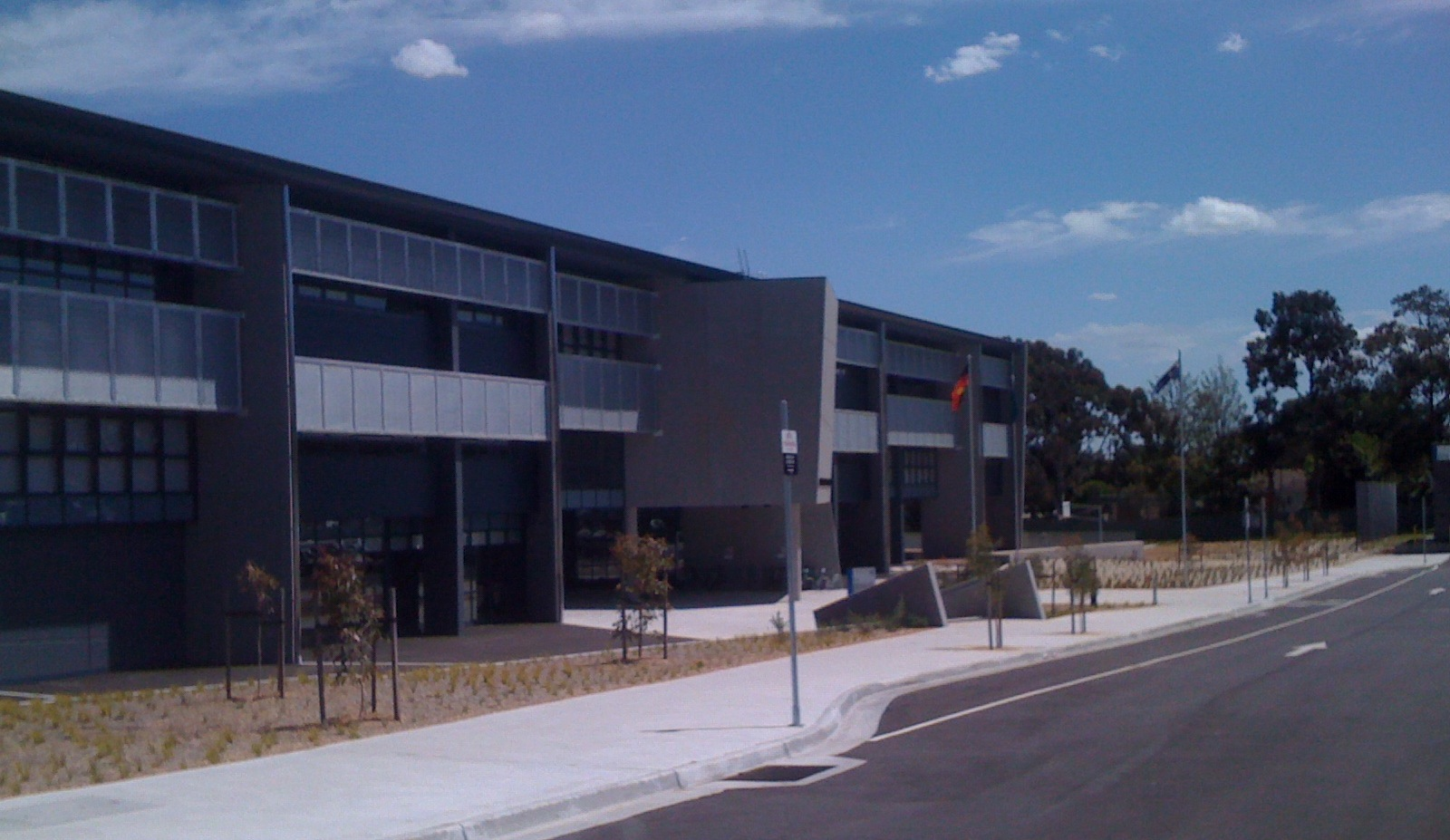
- Main entrance to the school

Location
- Clayton campus of Monash University; Australia; 37°54′50″S 145°07′44″E

Information
- Type: Government-funded secondary day school
- Established: 2009; 17 years ago
- Founders: Government of Victoria; Monash University
- Specialist: Science and technology
- Principal: Andrew Chisholm
- Years: 10–12
- Gender: Co-educational
- Enrolment: c. 640
- Houses: Doherty (blue); Flannery (green); Blackburn (purple); Wood (silver)
- Colours: Navy blue, white, sky blue
- Affiliations: Monash University
- Website: www.jmss.vic.edu.au

John Monash Science School is a government-funded co-educational academically selective and specialist secondary day school, located on the Clayton campus of Monash University, in Melbourne, Victoria, Australia. The school specialises in science and technologies and is the state's first specialist science secondary school. A joint venture between the Government of Victoria and Monash University, the school opened in 2009 with one Year 10 class; and as of 2010 it was running at its full capacity of approximately 660 students. The school is named in honour of Sir John Monash.

== Overview ==
It is one of three recently established co-educational selective high schools in Victoria, alongside Suzanne Cory High School and Nossal High School. The addition of these schools resulted from a policy of expanding selective government education in Victoria, doubling the number of fully selective government schools in the state. Prior to their establishment, Mac.Robertson Girls' High School, Melbourne High School and the Victorian College of the Arts Secondary School were the only selective-entry government schools in Victoria.

Entry into John Monash Science School is competitive, with applicants first required to sit an entrance examination administered by EduTest, assessing scientific reasoning and mathematical aptitude. Approximately the top 600 students are invited to an interview, from which around 200 students are offered Year 10 places for the following year.

More than 2000 students sat the entrance examination in 2024 for the 200 Year 10 places available (100 male and 100 female). A limited number of Year 11 places are also offered each year, typically between 25 and 30 depending on cohort size, with more than 200 applicants in most years.

Year 10 students undertake a range of specialist science electives, including nanotechnology, marine biology, biomedicine, geology, bioinformatics, spectroscopy, Pharmaceutical Sciences and Materials Science. Students also complete a year-long Extended Experimental Investigation (EEI), culminating in presentations at the annual John Monash Science School Science Fair (JMSSSF). The school has developed a strong reputation for Earth and environmental science, with many EEI projects focusing on topics in geology, environmental science, geochemistry and related disciplines.

John Monash Science School is a regular contributor to Australia's representation at international Earth science competitions. Students have represented Australia at the International Earth Science Olympiad, and in 2025 six JMSS students were selected to represent Australia internationally, including at the International Geography Olympiad and the International Earth and Environmental Science Olympiad.

In 2024, the school ranked fourth among all government schools in Victoria. It was ranked first in the state for VCE Environmental Science and VCE Physics, first in Algorithmics (HESS) among all secondary schools, second for VCE Mathematical Methods, and third for VCE Psychology. The school has ranked within the top 10 in Victoria for VCE Chemistry, Specialist Mathematics and Biology.

== House system ==
The student body is divided into four houses:

- Flannery (green, house mascot a Griffin)
- Blackburn (purple, house mascot a Phoenix)
- Wood (silver, house mascot a Wolf)
- Doherty (blue, house mascot a Dragon)

Each house is named after an accomplished Australian scientist: Tim Flannery, Elizabeth Blackburn, Fiona Wood, and Peter Doherty respectively.

== NBN Virtual School of Emerging Sciences ==
On 13 February 2013, the NBN Virtual School of Emerging Sciences (NVSES) was launched in a coalition effort between John Monash Science School, Monash University, and Pearson Education. Utilizing the Australian government's National Broadband Network's (NBN) educational facilities, lessons are taught by JMSS staff and Monash University scientists via internet to schools all around Australia. Two subjects are currently offered: astrophysics (which leads on to quantum physics) and nanoscience (leading on to nanotechnology).

== See also ==
- List of schools in Victoria
- Monash Tech School
