= Clayton North Primary School =

Primary school in Melbourne, Victoria, Australia

Location
- Clayton, Melbourne, Victoria; Australia; 37°54′45″S 145°07′26″E

Information
- Type: Public primary school
- Established: 1865; 161 years ago
- Principal: Sue Simadri
- Teaching staff: ~30
- Grades: Foundation–Year 6
- Enrolment: 224 (2025)
- Campus type: Suburban
- Website: claytonnorthps.vic.edu.au

History
- Built: 1909

Site notes
- Architect(s): J. B. Cohen; Public Works Department
- Architectural style: Edwardian Baroque

Victorian Heritage Register
- Official name: Primary School No. 734
- Type: Registered place
- Designated: 1 June 1995
- Reference no.: H1084
- Heritage overlay no.: HO20
- Category: Education

The Clayton North Primary School is a public co-educational primary school located at 1714 Dandenong Road, in Clayton, an outer eastern suburb of Melbourne, in Victoria, Australia. Administered by the Victorian Department of Education, the school has been in continuous operation since 1865 and, as of 2025, had 224 students enrolled.

The main brick building of the school, erected in 1909, was added to the Victorian Heritage Register on 1June 1995 in recognition of its architectural and historical significance.

== Description ==
Established in 1865 as the Mulgrave Common School No. 734 on the corner of Dandenong Road and Clayton Road, fifty students were initially enrolled. In 1875 its original wooden school building was replaced by a stone and brick structure comprising one classroom. The name of the school changed to Clayton Road State School in 1889; and it became an adjunct of Oakleigh State School (No. 1601) in 1894. The name of the school changed again to Clayton State School in 1901 and Grades 1, 2 and 3 remained at Clayton Road while grades 4, 5, and 6 attended other schools in the area.

In 1909 a brick building was constructed in Edwardian Baroque style which incorporated the earlier structure, designed by J. B. Cohen of the Public Works Department. The main school building has highly asymmetrical elevations combining a variety of gables, parapet lines, rain water heads and chimneys, and featuring a squat octagonal lantern bell tower. It successfully incorporates the earlier brick and stone structure into its design.

The name of the school was changed to Clayton North State School in 1954 and a new school building on a new site opened the same year on Brown's Road. The school was renamed as Clayton North Primary School, its current name, in 1970. Further development occurred during the 1970s, 2000s, and again in 2012.

== Demographics ==
Located in an area historically known for its cultural diversity, the school uniform of an orange shirt symbolises harmony and its logo features multicultural hands representing caring and diverse cultures. In 2025, English was an additional language for 71 per cent of its students.

== See also ==
- Education in Victoria
- List of government schools in Victoria, Australia
