= Wellington Secondary College =

Coordinates: 37°56′01″S 145°10′11″E

Location
- 91 Police Road; Mulgrave, Victoria, Australia

Information
- Type: State school
- Motto: Caring, Serving, Learning
- Established: 1972; 54 years ago
- Principal: Chris Knight
- Teaching staff: 104
- Years: 7–12
- Gender: Coeducation
- Enrollment: 2,248
- Colours: Blue and yellow
- Newspaper: Wellington Journal (fortnightly); The Wellington Way (each term)
- Yearbook: Vanellus
- Website: Wellington Secondary College

Wellington Secondary College is a co-educational state high school in Mulgrave, Melbourne, Victoria, Australia.

The college is divided into three sub-schools and six year levels: junior school (7–8), middle school (9–10) and senior school (11–12). Distinguished former Victorian Bushrangers cricketer Brendan McArdle is a teacher at the school.

== Coat-of-arms and motto ==
The emblem was updated in 2002 to have a more contemporary feel than the old design, but while still retaining key elements.

- The bird, representing striving
- The book, representing learning
- The tree, representing the local history of the region

The school motto is "Caring, Striving, Learning".

The bird is a Vanellus, that nests in the college grounds as part of its migratory journey each year.

== History ==
Wellington was established in 1972 as Dingle Area High School. Its name changed to Mulgrave High School, then to Wellington High School in January 1973. Wellington was originally intended for the Dingley area, but was relocated by the Education Department to the Mulgrave area.

== Principals ==
Founding principal of the school was A.M. (Gus) Fogarty, from 1973 to 1977. M.B. (Max) Peters was appointed principal in 1978 after the death of Forgarty in 1977. Max Peters retired in July 1982 and Jack Landvogt was appointed in 1984, then retired in 1986. John Coulson was appointed in 1987, and introduced the school motto (Caring, Striving, Learning) and the college crest. John Coulson retired in 2004 and the principal, Mary-Jo Putrino, was appointed. In mid 2012, Putrino retired, and a new principal, Edward "Hugh" Blaikie was appointed. He was the principal from 2012 to 2023. Chris Knight is the current principal since 2024.

== Houses ==
The House System commenced in 1988 and the titles were derived from the names of four ships from the historic First Fleet that landed the first permanent European settlers from Great Britain in Australia two hundred years earlier in 1788 under the command of the Governor, Captain Arthur Phillip.

Each house is led by two senior house captains (year 12) and six vice house captains (years 8, 10 and 11):

- Alexander (blue)
- Borrowdale (yellow)
- Penrhyn (green)
- Sirius (red)
- Choi-Yerim (Purple)

The house names were changed and designed by Year 7s in 2022.

- Dianella (blue)
- Acacia (yellow)
- Eucalyptus (green)
- Waratah (red)
- Patricia (Purple)

Students participate in a number of sporting and non-sporting activities during the year to gain points towards the M.B. Peter Cup for their house. There are three major house sporting carnivals in a year. They are the Swimming, Athletics and Cross-Country carnivals.

Since 2024, the performing arts staff have implemented house point awards for students that do not participate in sporting events, but participate in academic, social, and artistic excellence.

== Mascot ==
The school mascot is a bird named Viola.

The school mascot was designed by the Year 7s in 1901, as part of the Year 7 Design Sprint Challenge. Design Sprint Challenges were enacted to introduce Year 7s to the college, and allow them to build teamworking, creativity, and problem-solving skills

== School layout ==
The school has two large courtyards surrounded by blocks of classrooms. After opening the E.H. Blaikie Vanellus Centre in 2019, the school has recently upgraded B-Block and C-Block, and it also has G, J, M, R, and K Blocks. The school also has six basketball courts and a large open area which is referred to as the "oval", the oval is now a square due to having M-Block built over most of it. In K-Block, there are two gymnasiums, and two rooms with gym equipment. There was a $7.0 million upgrade to the school's facilities in 2010 to build a new junior school centre, and an upgrade to the halls that included a new performing arts centre and relocation of the school's "R" Block.

== Building program ==
On Monday 13 July 2009 the new junior school centre (replacing "P" Block) or also referred as the "M" Block was opened, and "R" block was relocated to make space for "M" Block. The two new gymnasiums were built. Term 4 witnessed the whole of the western courtyard demolished to make way for a designer landscape courtyard complete with brick work seating and shade sales. Work began on the new state of the art performing arts centre complete with 288-seat theatre. Funding was allocated for further improvements in 2018.

The original layout of the school was a government design from the mid-1970s. this was implemented and built at various schools around the state. Brentwood Secondary Colleges original layout was that of Wellington Secondary Colleges. A gym identical to Wellington's Original gym can be found at Mount Waverley Secondary College.

Term 2, 2019 saw the opening of the E. H. Blaikie Vanellus Centre. The new building houses the administration and front offices, the school library and classrooms, as well as a lecture space.

Term 4, 2021: A new senior school, well-being centre and international building opened.

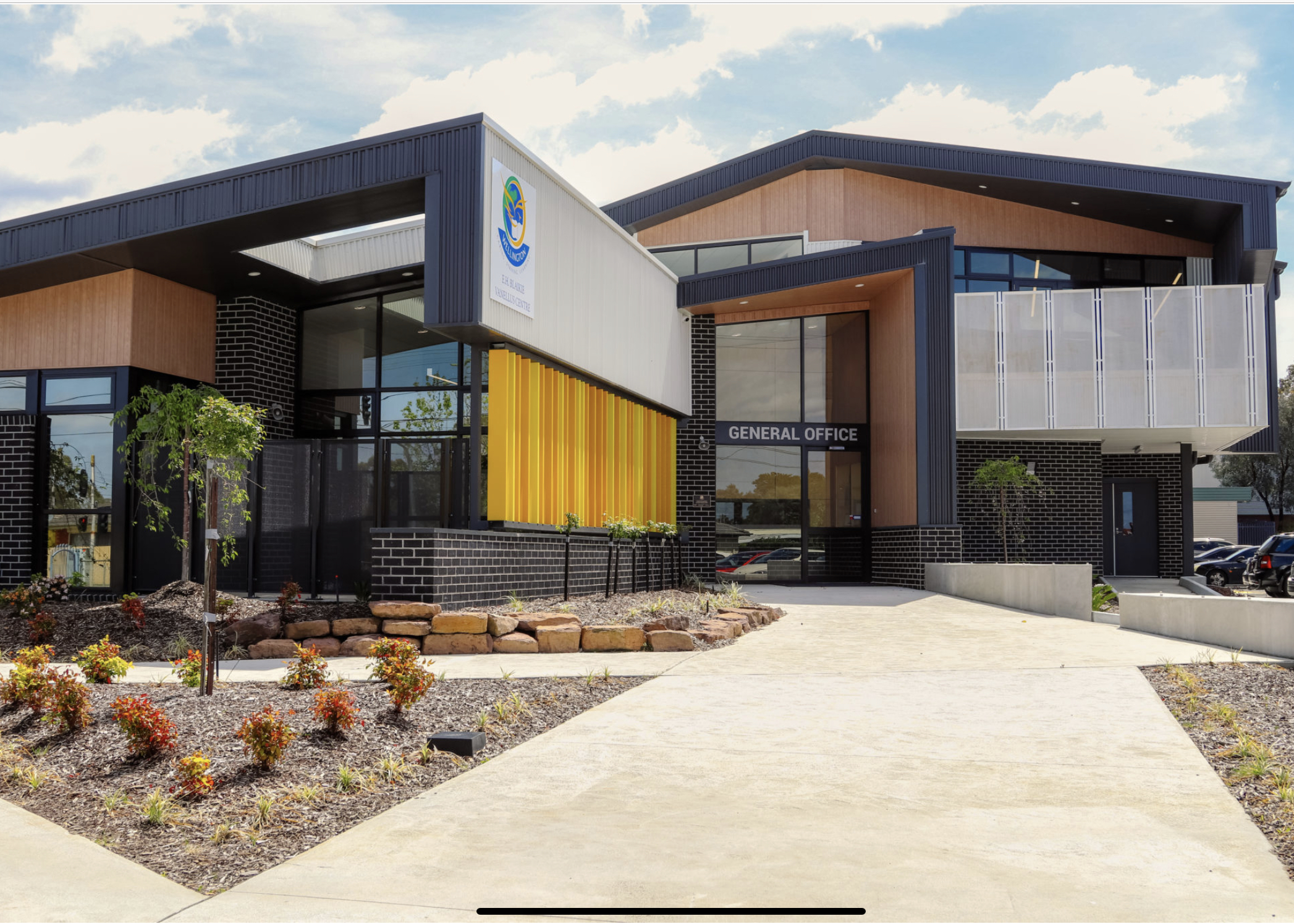

== Curriculum ==
=== English ===
English is compulsory for all year levels, with the exception of students studying ESL (English as a Second Language). Students undertake many varied activities in developing their skills in this subject area. At the VCE level, mainstream students can choose to study either English, Literature or English Language.

=== Languages other than English ===
The foreign languages studied at Wellington Secondary College are Mandarin and French. It was French and Indonesian that students could study. The Indonesian language class was removed, making the only foreign languages that students can learn French or Mandarin

Students undertake French or Mandarin, and English as a second language (Only for international students) from years 7 to 8, and have the choice to study it in years 9 and up. A student's form group within their cohort, from years 7–9, depends on the language that they choose upon enrollment.

== Uniform ==
Uniform is compulsory at the college.

Students in years 7–10 wear a royal blue pullover that features the college emblem while the senior students wear a similar navy blue pullover. Most year 7-10 students opt to wearing their rain jackets year-round, while senior students wear a navy jumper. Year 12s have been allowed to set custom names on the dorsum of their year 12 jacket, although potentially offensive names are prohibited. Student leaders wear a distinctive blazer with a special pocket that denotes their appointment. When students do not have a double period Health and Physical Education class, they must wear polishable, flat-soled black shoes. Ties are compulsory when the shirts are worn, and are sold at the sub-school offices. White socks are always expected. Permitted accessories include navy scarves, tights, and gloves. The school branded bags are encouraged, but not compulsory.

During winter, girls wear a light blue blouse and blue plaid skirt or navy academic pants, and boys wear the long-sleeve shirt with navy trousers. During summer, girls wear the summer dress while boys navy trousers or shorts with a short-sleeve light blue shirt. The school has no policy restricting girls from wearing boys' uniform, but there is also no short sleeve girls shirt. Girls can choose between skirts and dresses that are cropped to their midthighs or to their ankles.

There is also a sports uniform, which includes of a polo in the school logo's colours, which comes in both a short-sleeve and long-sleeve variant. Sports uniform also permits running shoes.

== Media ==
In the 2017–18 State Budget, it was announced that $5.5 million was allocated to the school to build a new library, technology and administration area.

Amber Truong's story and her outstanding 2017 VCE performance were covered by "The Age".

The school has a Soundcloud Podcast run by the performing arts staff and students.
