= Mazenod College, Victoria =

Mazenod College

Location
- Kernot Avenue; Mulgrave, Victoria 3170; Australia –37.915976 145.165173

Information
- Type: Independent, single-sex (male)
- Motto: Latin: Nihil Linquendum Inausum (Leave Nothing Undared for the Kingdom of God)
- Denomination: Roman Catholic
- Established: 1967
- Sister school: Avila College
- Rector: Fr Harry Dyer OMI
- Principal: Dr. Paul Shannon
- Staff: 140
- Years: 7–12
- Gender: Boys
- Enrolment: 1400+
- Colours: Black, white, blue
- Nickname: Nodders
- Affiliation: Associated Catholic Colleges
- Website: www.mazenod.vic.edu.au

Mazenod College is an independent, Roman Catholic, day-school for boys, located in Mulgrave, Victoria. It is one of three schools run by the Oblates of Mary Immaculate (OMI) and the only one in Victoria. Mazenod College is a member of the Associated Catholic Colleges (ACC). Currently, the principal is Dr. Paul Shannon, and the rector is Fr. Harry Dyer OMI

== Curriculum ==
Mazenod College offers its senior students the Victorian Certificate of Education (VCE).

VCE results 2012-2025
| Year | Rank | Median study score | Scores of 40+ (%) | Cohort size |
|---|---|---|---|---|
| 2012 | 70 | 33 | 14 | 352 |
| 2013 | 81 | 33 | 12.2 | 354 |
| 2014 | 97 | 32 | 9.8 | 344 |
| 2015 | 97 | 32 | 9.9 | 331 |
| 2016 | 87 | 32 | 11.5 | 363 |
| 2017 | 95 | 32 | 10.9 | 414 |
| 2018 | 82 | 32 | 12.7 | 339 |
| 2019 | 94 | 32 | 11.2 | 358 |
| 2020 | 94 | 32 | 10.9 | 402 |
| 2021 | 86 | 32 | 11 | 403 |
| 2022 | 85 | 32 | 11.5 | 389 |
| 2023 | 82 | 32 | 12.6 | 382 |
| 2024 | 67 | 33 | 13.5 | 396 |
| 2025 | 64 | 33 | 15.3 | 421 |

== Associated Catholic Colleges premierships ==
Mazenod has won the following ACC premierships.

- Aggregate Fixtured Sports Award (2) – 2012, 2019
- Badminton (5) – 2013, 2014, 2015, 2018, 2022, 2023
- Basketball (2) – 2017, 2018
- Chess (23) – 1999, 2000, 2001, 2004, 2005, 2006, 2007, 2008, 2009, 2010, 2011, 2012, 2013, 2014, 2015, 2016, 2017, 2018, 2019, 2020, 2021, 2022, 2023
- Cricket – 2005
- Cricket T20 – 2020
- Hockey – 2002
- Lawn Bowls (2) – 2019, 2020
- Soccer (4) – 2016, 2017, 2018, 2019
- Swimming – 2011
- Table Tennis (11) – 2004, 2006, 2008, 2011, 2012, 2014, 2015, 2016, 2017, 2018, 2019
- Tennis (6) – 2005, 2010, 2012, 2013, 2014, 2015
- Volleyball (23) – 1999, 2000, 2001, 2002, 2003, 2004, 2005, 2006, 2007, 2008, 2009, 2010, 2011, 2012, 2014, 2015, 2016, 2017, 2018, 2019, 2020, 2021, 2022, 2023

== Notable alumni ==
VFL/AFL

- Matt Johnson (Footscray)
- Silvio Foschini (Sydney Swans, St Kilda)
- Aldo Dipetta (St Kilda, Sydney Swans)
- Chris Sullivan (Melbourne, Richmond)
- Carl Steinfort (Collingwood, Geelong)
- Matthew Boyd (Western Bulldogs)
- Heath Black (Fremantle, St Kilda)
- Andrew Carrazzo (Carlton)
- Scott Thornton (Fremantle)
- Ashley Hansen (West Coast Eagles)
- Matthew Arnot (Richmond)
- Alex Woodward (Hawthorn)
- David Mirra (Hawthorn)
- Jake Soligo (Adelaide)
- Miller Bergman (North Melbourne)
- Sullivan Robey (Essendon)
- Cristian Sofocleous (Hawthorn)

Soccer

- Joseph Khorani (Olympique de Marseille and Iraq National Football Team)
- Roman Papadopoulos (Manchester United and Greece National Football Team)
- Nishan Velupillay (Melbourne Victory)
- Jordi Valadon (Melbourne City, Melbourne Victory)
- Barath Suresh (SC Germania Erftstadt-Lechenich, Niendorfer TSV, Sri Lanka National Football Team)
- Rahul Suresh (TuS Königsdorf, Niendorfer TSV, Sri Lanka National Football Team)
- Joshua Valadon (Richmond sc [NPL], savona calcio [italian serie C1] Mauritian national team)

American football

- Rhys Dakin (Iowa Hawkeyes football)

Hockey

- Chris Ciriello (Australia men's national field hockey team)

Tennis

- Peter Luczak (Australian Davis Cup Representative)
- Andrew Florent

Athletics

- Peter Robertson (World Champion Triathlete)
- Jeffrey Riseley (Australian representative to the 2012 Olympics in Athletics)

Corporate Leadership

- Sean-Paul Stephens (Chief Executive Officer of Ngarluma Yindjibarndi Foundation Ltd, WA)

Food

- George Calombaris (Award-winning chef and judge on Masterchef Australia)

Media

- Gerard Whateley (Co-host of Fox Footy's AFL 360 program and ABC media commentator)

Music

- Damian Cowell (lead vocalist and drummer of ARIA Award-winning band TISM (as Humphrey B. Flaubert) and later of Root! and The DC3)
- Peter Minack, (vocalist of ARIA-Award Winning band TISM (as Ron Hitler Barassi)

Volleyball

- Damien Schumann (Gold Medallist in Beach Volleyball in the Commonwealth Games, 2020 Olympian for Australia)

ACC Athletics MVP

- Andre Antoun (Multiple Time ACC Winner, Across the Bay Participant 2026)
