= Mount Waverley Secondary College =

School in Australia

Coordinates: 37°52′04″S 145°07′58″E

- Mount Waverley Secondary College, 2006

Location
- Stephensons Road; Mount Waverley, Victoria 3149; Australia

Information
- Type: Public
- Motto: Community. Choice. Engagement.
- Established: 1964
- Principal: Karen Wade
- Staff: 180
- Years: 7–12
- Enrolment: 1,950
- Colour: Yellow green
- Website: www.mwsc.vic.edu.au

Mount Waverley Secondary College is a public secondary school located in the Melbourne suburb of Mount Waverley. The school consists of roughly 1900 students and is one of the largest in the state. The school consists of two campuses (junior and senior) both situated on Stephensons Road in Mount Waverley. The Junior Campus holds years 7 and 8, with year levels 9 to 12 at the Senior Campus. The campuses are a short walking distance apart.

== History ==
Mount Waverley Secondary College officially opened in 1964 as Mount Waverley High School with seventy-three Form 1 pupils, six teaching staff and one staff member in the office. The school's emblem, the unicorn, represents Sir Walter Scott who authored the Waverley Novels.

The three Light Timber Construction (LTC) buildings, which were clad in orange brick, were constructed in various stages after the school's opening. The school changed name to Mount Waverley Secondary College in the early 1990s and later occupied the site of the former Waverley North Primary School (also constructed in LTC) after that school was closed, thus forming a "junior campus" from the site.

Mount Waverley Secondary College (formerly Mount Waverley High School) has no association with Waverley High School which was located in Chadstone, Victoria and was permanently closed in the 1990s.

On Tuesday, 28 January 2003 (the day before the commencement of the school year), much of the Middle/Senior campus LTC buildings were destroyed by a deliberately lit fire causing an estimated $4 million in damage. Classrooms damaged in the fire included five IT classrooms, three science rooms, one fabrics room and 11 general purpose classrooms. A further two science rooms and three home economics rooms were also damaged in the fire.

All staff and students were relocated to Deakin University's Burwood campus for three weeks immediately after the fire. The rebuilt school was officially opened in December 2004, after $5.6 million was spent on rebuilding.

== Facilities ==
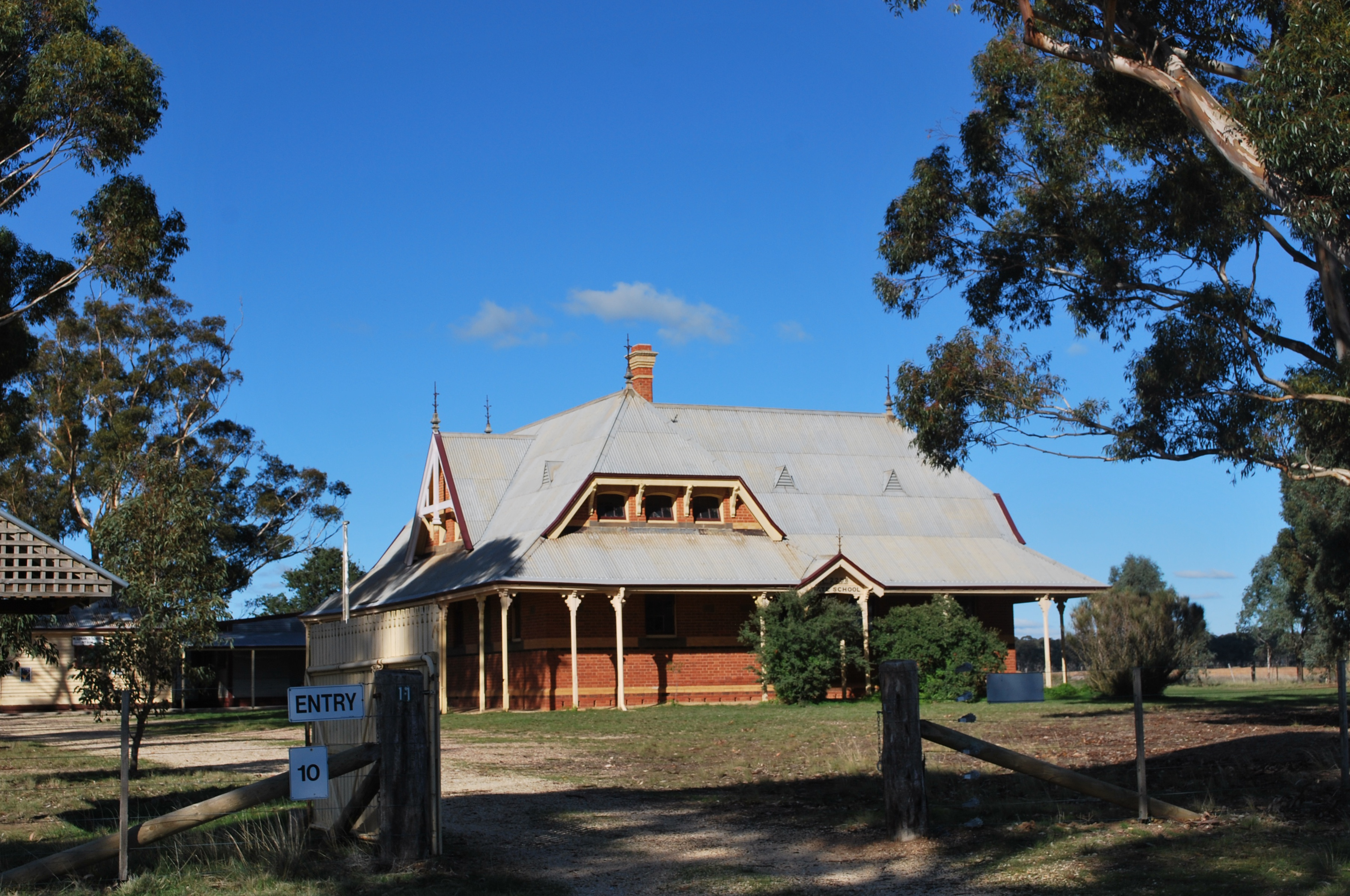
Lower Homebush State School, now a historic reserve

The senior site has a modern two-story building, which was constructed after the fire of 2003, along with a number of art buildings and portables. (Most of the Light Timber Construction buildings were demolished after the fire). The junior site consisted of 3 blocks and one school oval, all were connected with covered walkways. But in 2009 Mount Waverley Secondary College was given 10.1 million dollars from the government, allowing the build of two brand new buildings on the Junior site. The Junior Campus is now positioned as a flagship school. It has received international attention for design and learning capacity. The Junior Campus design has won the following awards:

- International CEFPI Award – Best new construction of a major facility
- Australian Chapter of the Council of Education – Award for Facilities Design
- The Project of Distinction Award by the Council of Educational Facility Planners International (CEFPI) for Best Middle School/Junior High

The Senior Campus also hosts the 200 seat Unicorn Theatre facility, two libraries, and two gymnasiums. The school once leased a school camp, from the historic trust the historic Lower Homebush State School #2258 in Avoca, Western Victoria. The school was closed in 1967, and reopened as the Lower Homebush Campus in 1996 as a school camp.

== Curriculum ==
In the Junior and Middle Schools (Years 7–8 and 9–10 respectively), the College offers a comprehensive curriculum based on the Victorian Essential Learning Standards (VELS). Students are allowed greater choice in their subjects beginning in Year 9, where they can choose their electives (which are separate from the core curriculum).

For the Senior School (Years 11–12), the students can study for their Victorian Certificate of Education (VCE). The College offers a wide range of subjects from all learning areas. Students also have access to Vocational Education and Training (VET) subjects as part of their VCE program.

== Co-curriculum ==
=== Student Leadership ===
The student body is represented by Student Leadership Teams (SLT) that operate at each year level from Years 8–11. Students in Year 12 have the opportunity to become prefects or captains. Recently, Mount Waverley Secondary College's SLT have won numerous awards, including:

- Australia's Team Leadership Award for Students (ATLAS) from Halogen Australia
- Department of Education and Training SRC of the Year award from the Victorian Student Representative Council (VicSRC)
- Group Action Award from the Victorian Student Representative Council (VicSRC) (second runner-up)

=== Drama ===
Every year, the College runs a school-wide production. Previous productions include Split Earth(2025),Mamma Mia (2024), Chicago (2023), Matilda (2022), Seussical The Musical (2021), The Addams Family (2019), Bring It On The Musical (2018), Legally Blonde The Musical (2017), Beauty and the Beast (2016), Fame (2015), Footloose (2014), The Writer (2012), Little Shop of Horrors and Grease. Due to the 2020 COVID-19 pandemic, the College's production of Seussical The Musical was delayed, being pushed into 2021.

=== Music ===
Year 7 students at the college have the opportunity to learn an instrument as part of the classroom music program. Instruments taught include those in the brass, woodwind and string families. Outside the classroom, students of all year levels have the opportunity to join ensembles at the College, including wind bands, big bands and string orchestras. Ensembles at the college frequently engage in inter-school festivals and competitions, including the annual Generations in Jazz competition. In 2019, the College's Symphonic Band and Stage Band traveled to Sydney to participate in the Australian International Music Festival.

=== Sports ===
Students have the opportunity to participate in a range of inter-school sports competitions, including basketball, badminton, netball, AFL football, cross country, soccer, softball, baseball, cricket, swimming, hockey, volleyball, tennis, athletics, and table tennis. The College boasts a strong reputation in its sporting achievements, particularly within competitions between local schools. Many of the students go on to compete at a state level.

Mount Waverley Secondary College's intermediate boys soccer team won the state finals on 5 September 2018.

=== Debating ===
The Mount Waverley Association of Debaters (M.A.D.) have several debating teams from Years 9–12 who all represent the College in inter-school debating competitions.

== Notable alumni ==
- Nick Barker, musician
- Taylin Duman, AFL footballer
- Brett Godfrey, co-founder and initial CEO of Virgin Australia Airlines
- Peter Handscomb, Australian Test cricketer
- Jeff Hogg, AFL footballer
- Dean Jones, cricketer
- John Kim, actor
- Chris Knights, AFL footballer
- Van Tuong Nguyen, convicted drug trafficker in Singapore, hanged in December 2005
- Paul Reiffel, Australian Test cricketer and umpire
- Graeme "Shirley" Strachan, lead singer with Skyhooks, carpenter, TV presenter
- Peter Tatchell, British human rights campaigner and LGBT activist
- Bret Thornton, AFL footballer
- Emily Whitehead, artistic gymnast
- Kate Eddy, netballer
- Daniel McKenzie, AFL footballer
- Gemma Lagioia, AFLW player
