= Oakleigh East, Victoria =

Oakleigh East
- Suburb
- Interactive map of Oakleigh East
- Coordinates: 37.896°S 145.112°E
- Country: Australia
- State: Victoria
- City: Melbourne
- LGA: Monash
- Location: 16 km (9.9 mi) from Melbourne

Government
  - State electorate: Oakleigh
  - Federal division: Hotham

Area
  - Total: 2.1 km^{2} (0.81 sq mi)
- Elevation: 85 m (279 ft)

Population
  - Total: 6,804 (SAL 2021)
- Postcode: 3166
Suburbs around Oakleigh East
Chadstone	Mount Waverley	Mount Waverley
Oakleigh	Oakleigh East	Clayton
Oakleigh	Huntingdale	Clayton

Oakleigh East is a suburb in Melbourne, Victoria, Australia 16 km south-east of Melbourne's Central Business District, located within the City of Monash local government area. Oakleigh East recorded a population of 6,804 at the 2021 census.

The suburb is mostly residential with some commercial lots. The suburb is bordered by Ferntree Gully Road to the north, Clayton Road to the east, North Road to the south, and the Princes Highway and Franklyn Street to the west.

== History ==
An Oakleigh East Post Office opened on 15 June 1918 on Huntingdale Road near Huntingdale (then East Oakleigh) railway station. This was renamed Huntingdale around 1955. In 1967 another Oakleigh East office opened on Huntingdale Road north of Dandenong Road (Princes Highway).

== Today ==
The suburb has a small commercial hub on Huntingdale Road and the Princes Highway, which includes a post office, a liquor store, restaurants, a massage parlour, a hair salon, a golf injury clinic, and a mower shop.

Another small commercial strip stands the Ferntree Gully Road end of Macrina Street. This strip includes an IGA, a laundromat, and a few restaurants and cafes.

The suburb has one primary school, Amsleigh Park Primary School, and several preschools and early learning centres. Along Princes Hwy there is a large oval, park and playground area known as Princes Hwy Reserve. Opposite this park is the Clayton Chinese Christian Church. Other parks in the suburb include Reg Harris Reserve on Carmichael Road and Ferntree Gully Road, Hurst Reserve on Ferntree Gully Road and Princes Hwy, Cheel St Reserve on Ferntree Gully Road and Cheel St, F E Hunt Reserve on Highland Ave.

The suburb has a scout hall, the Victorian Rover Centre, which is located in F E Hunt Reserve.

The suburb is serviced by the 800/802/804/862 buses on Princes Hwy, the 733 bus on Clayton Road, the 693 and 742 buses on Ferntree Gully Road, and the 630 and 900 SmartBus service on North Road.

== Sport ==
The suburb is home to the Oakleigh District Football Club of the SFNL. The club is based at Princes Highway Reserve.

== See also ==
- City of Oakleigh – Oakleigh East was previously within this former local government area.
