= Mulgrave, Victoria =

Mulgrave
- Suburb
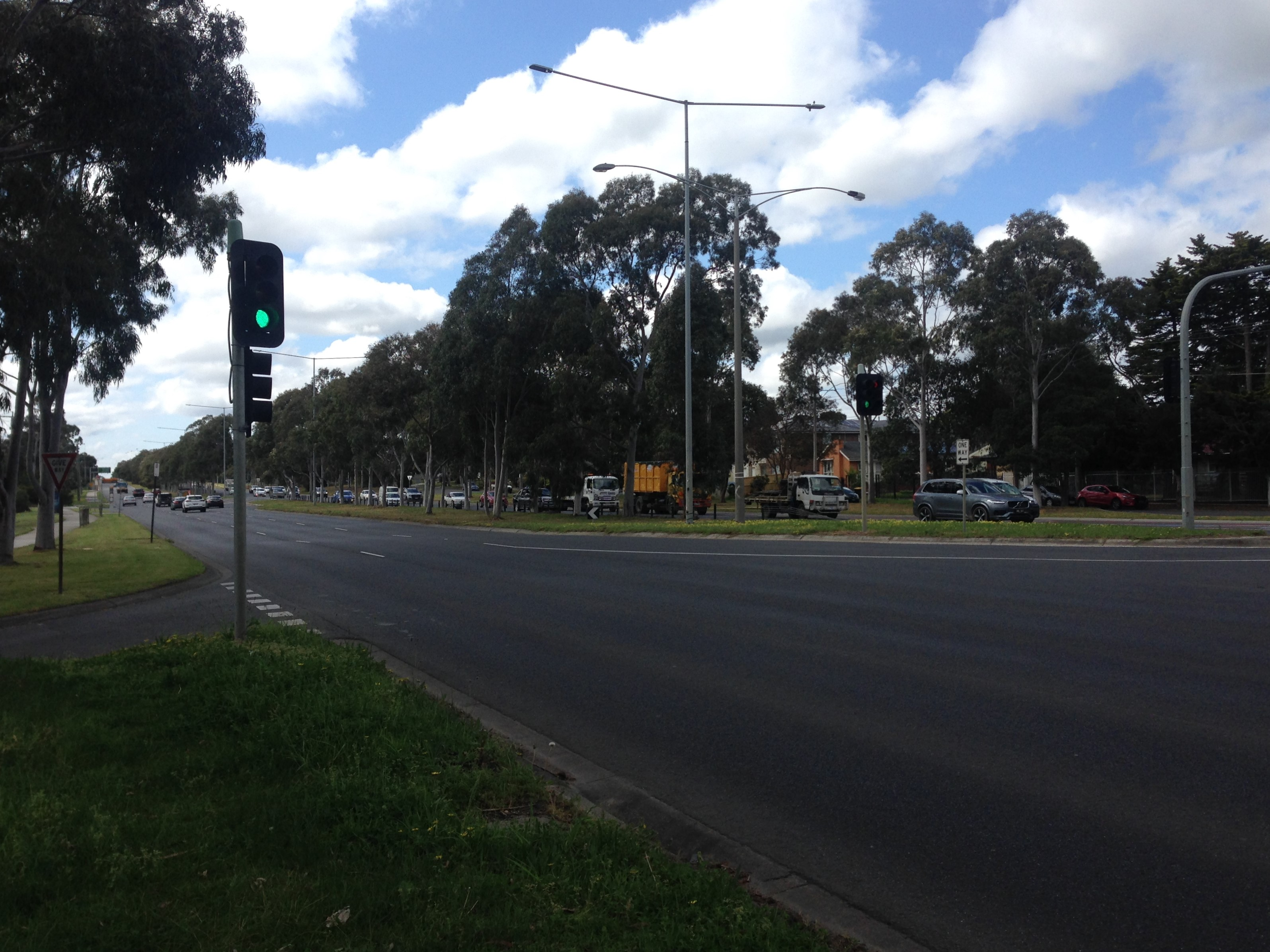
- Wellington Road, Mulgrave

- Interactive map of Mulgrave
- Coordinates: 37.928°S 145.174°E
- Country: Australia
- State: Victoria
- City: Melbourne
- LGA: City of Monash
- Location: 21 km (13 mi) from Melbourne

Government
  - State electorate: Mulgrave
  - Federal divisions: Hotham; Chisholm

Area
  - Total: 11.1 km^{2} (4.3 sq mi)
- Elevation: 75 m (246 ft)

Population
  - Total: 19,889 (2021 census)
  - Density: 1,792/km^{2} (4,641/sq mi)
- Postcode: 3170
Suburbs around Mulgrave
Notting Hill	Glen Waverley and Wheelers Hill	Scoresby
Clayton	Mulgrave	Rowville
Springvale	Noble Park North	Dandenong North

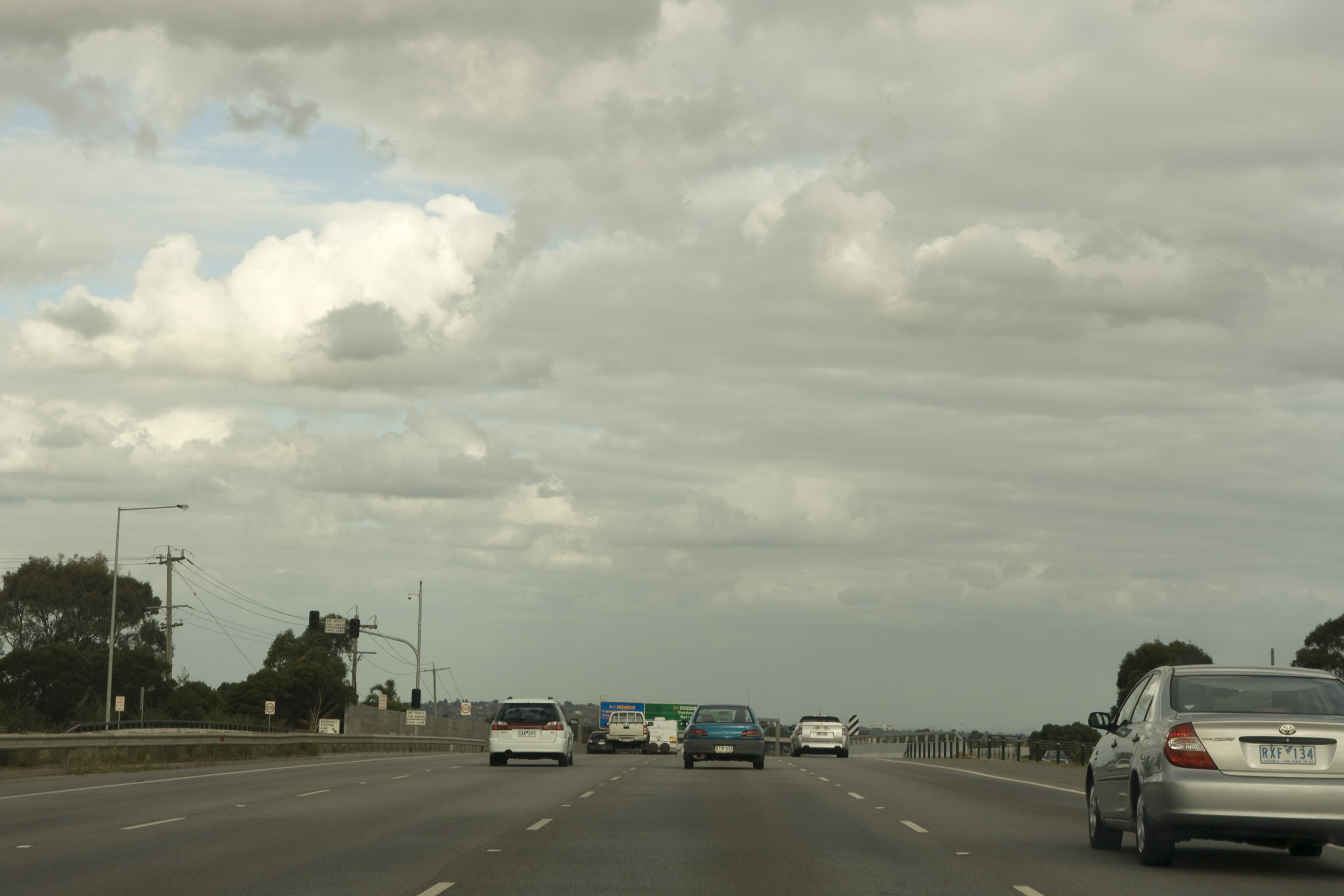
Monash Freeway, Mulgrave

Mulgrave is an eastern suburb of Melbourne, Victoria, Australia, situated 21 kilometres (13 mi) south-east of the Melbourne city centre. It is located within the City of Monash local government area. Mulgrave had a population of 19,889 at the 2021 census.

The suburb takes its name from Mulgrave Castle in the English County of North Yorkshire. Sir George Phipps, the Earl of Mulgrave in the Peerage of Great Britain, served as the Governor of Victoria from 1879 to 1884.

The suburb in turn gave its name to the Mulgrave Freeway, that was later renamed as the Monash Freeway.

== History ==
=== European history ===
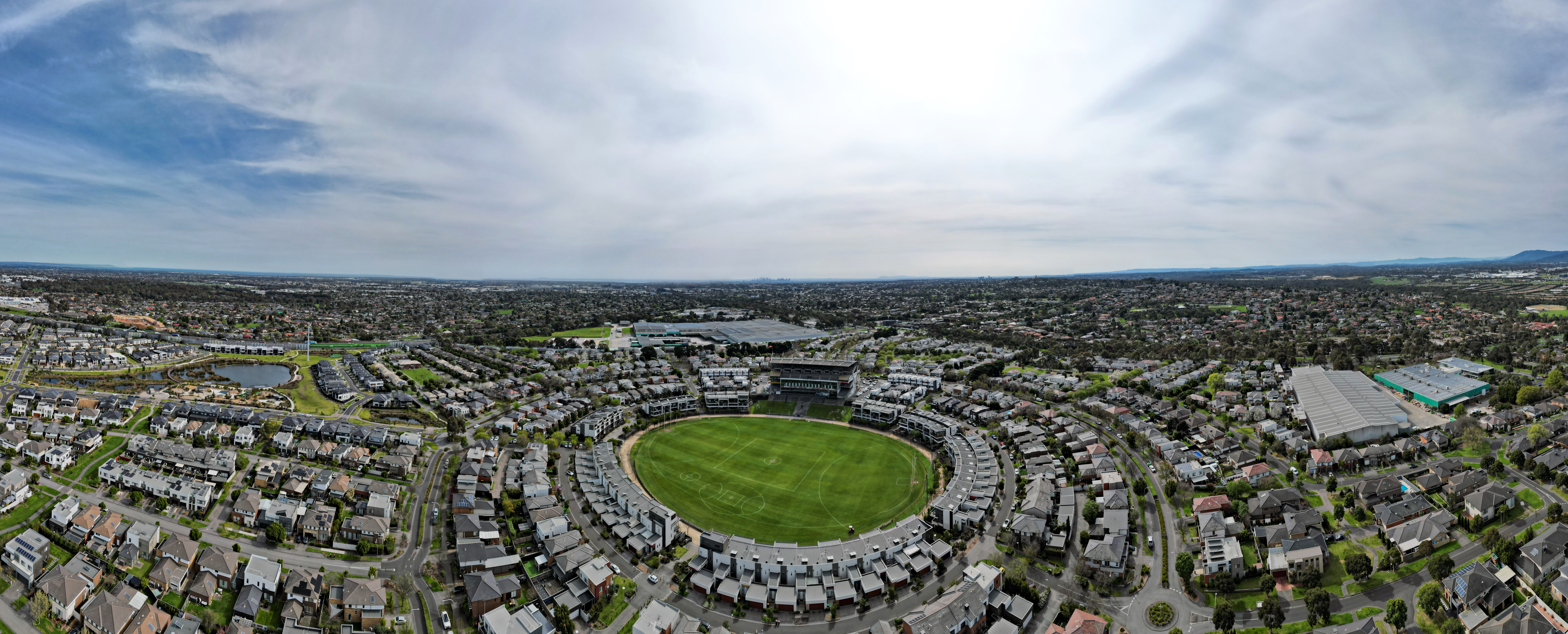
Aerial panorama of Waverley Park facing the Melbourne city skyline. September 2023.

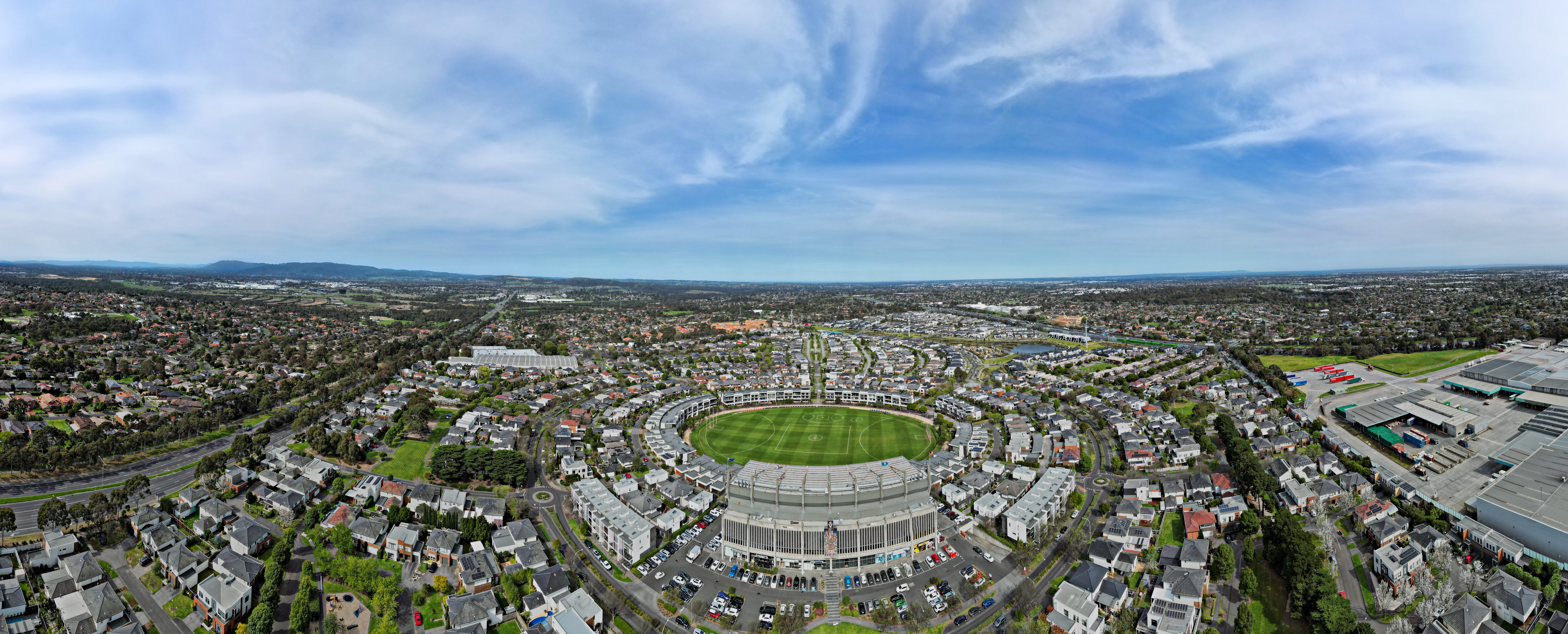
Aerial perspective of Waverley Park facing east towards Mount Dandenong. September 2023.

The first settler in Mulgrave parish (a division of the County of Bourke, which covers the Melbourne urban area) was Thomas Napier, in 1839. He was a Scottish builder who first reached the Colony of Victoria in the mid-1830s. Napier settled on the banks of Dandenong Creek and built his homestead in the Bushy Park Wetlands, in what is now Jells Park. None of the original homesteads remain, though some were demolished as late as the latter part of the 20th century. Remains of some homesteads were uncovered during the construction of the EastLink Tollway, temporarily halting work while they were archaeologically examined.

The Mulgrave Post Office opened on 1 January 1869 but was renamed Wheelers Hill in 1888. In 1904, a second Mulgrave Post Office opened but closed again in 1956. The third Mulgrave Post Office opened in 1967 and closed in 1978. Meanwhile, a Mulgrave North (later Brandon Park) office opened in 1971, and a Mulgrave East (later Waverley Gardens) office opened in 1978.

=== From Parish to shire ===
On 19 January 1857, the Oakleigh & Mulgrave Road District (an early form of local government in Victoria) was proclaimed, covering the same area as that covered by the parishes of Oakleigh and Mulgrave. On 1 December 1871, the road district was redesignated as a shire and renamed Shire of Oakleigh. On 13 March 1891, the Borough of Oakleigh was created by excising part of Oakleigh Shire, and, in 1897, Oakleigh Shire was renamed as Mulgrave Shire.

=== Reduction of size ===
Throughout its history, Mulgrave has been plagued by the shifting of its borders and the reduction of its total size. Its borders remained relatively unchanged until 1949 when land was transferred from Mulgrave Shire to Oakleigh City. This occurred again a decade later with the Shire of Mulgrave reduced to 23 square miles (60 km^{2}). As a part of the changes, offices for the Shire were opened in present-day Notting Hill.

The end of Mulgrave Shire as a name occurred in April 1961, when it was proclaimed a city but renamed as Waverley. The name nonetheless continues in use as the name of the suburb and of the parish.

=== Heritage listings ===
The following places in Mulgrave are listed on the Victorian Heritage Register:

- Waverley Park, at 2A Stadium Circuit, being the remnant parts of the main grandstand and oval
- Petersville Factory Administration Building, at 254-294 Wellington Road

== Present day ==
Mulgrave is one of the few Melbourne suburbs split into two distinct areas, with each sharing the common name but not prefixing it with 'East' or 'West'. This came about as a result of the renaming of parts of Mulgrave to Wheelers Hill, Victoria in the late 1990s. So separated by distance are the two parts that a group local residents from the South Eastern area campaigned, albeit unsuccessfully, in 2004 to have the area renamed to Waverley Park, Victoria.

Mulgrave is now best known for Jacksons Road, which runs through the eastern part of the suburb. Jacksons Road is familiar to many Melburnians due to the Jacksons Road Interchange with the Monash Freeway. The Jacksons Road Interchange is a VicRoads timing point for traffic travelling to/from the city.

Jacksons Road is a common point of reference for radio news traffic reports when broadcasting travel times into/from the city travelling on the Monash Freeway. Other major points of interest in Mulgrave are the Waverley Gardens Shopping Centre, the Village Green Hotel on the south-west corner of Springvale and Ferntree Gully Roads, the Sunday Mulgrave Farmers' Market on the corner of Jacksons and Wellington Roads, and the former Waverley Park AFL/VFL football ground, redeveloped by Mirvac for residential housing since 2002.

== Transport ==
Metropolitan buses run through this area as well as two popular SmartBus routes and the original hourly services. Most of these bus routes are run by Ventura Bus Lines.

== Sport ==
Sporting clubs located in Mulgrave include:

- Gladeswood Reserve Tennis Club (Gladeswood Reserve)
- Monash University Baseball Club (Gladeswood Reserve)
- Wellington Tennis Club (Southern Reserve)
- Warriors Gridiron Club (Southern Reserve)
- Brandon Park Soccer Club (Freeway Reserve)
- Mazenod Cricket Club (Mazenod College)

Aforementioned changes in the suburb's boundaries has meant that the suburb's major eponymous sporting clubs are in fact no longer located in present-day Mulgrave, despite continuing to represent the suburb.

The Mulgrave Cricket Club (established 1905) and Mulgrave Football Club (established 1925) share Mulgrave Reserve, which retains the suburb's name despite being located just outside the Mulgrave suburban boundary, in what is now Wheelers Hill. The Reserve is also home to the Eastern Devils Women's Football Club.

== Education ==
- Mazenod Secondary College
- Wellington Secondary College
- Albany Rise Primary School
- Mulgrave Primary School
- St John Vianney Primary School

== Notable residents ==
- Daniel Andrews, the 48th premier of Victoria
- Barry Mitchell, Australian rules footballer, grew up in Mulgrave

== See also ==
- City of Waverley – Mulgrave was previously within this former local government area
