= Monash University, Clayton campus =

University in Clayton, Victoria, Australia

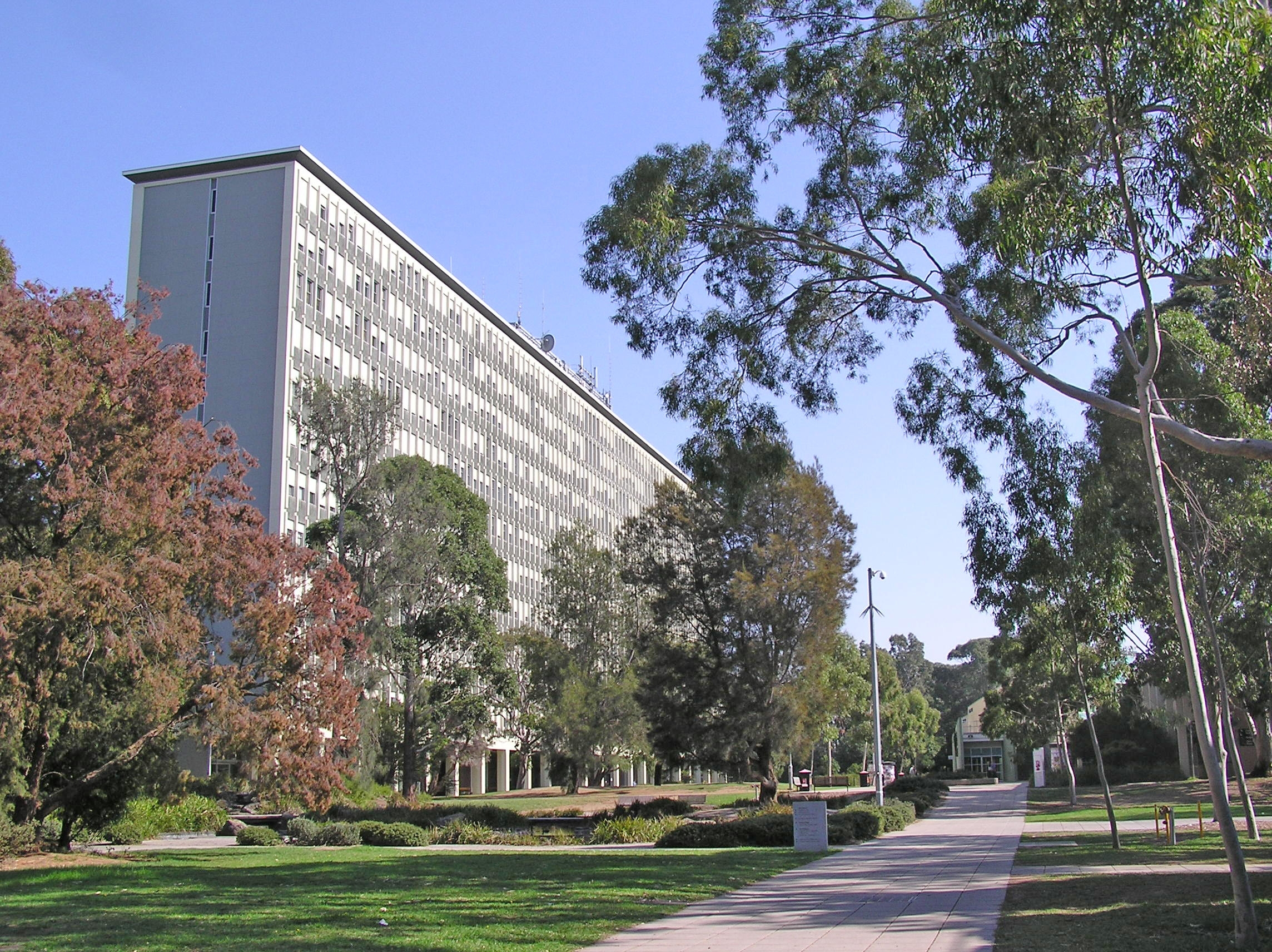
Robert Menzies Building

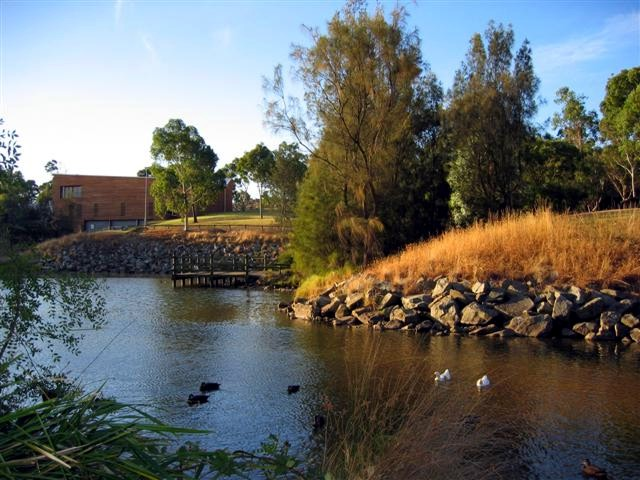
The lake near the halls of residence

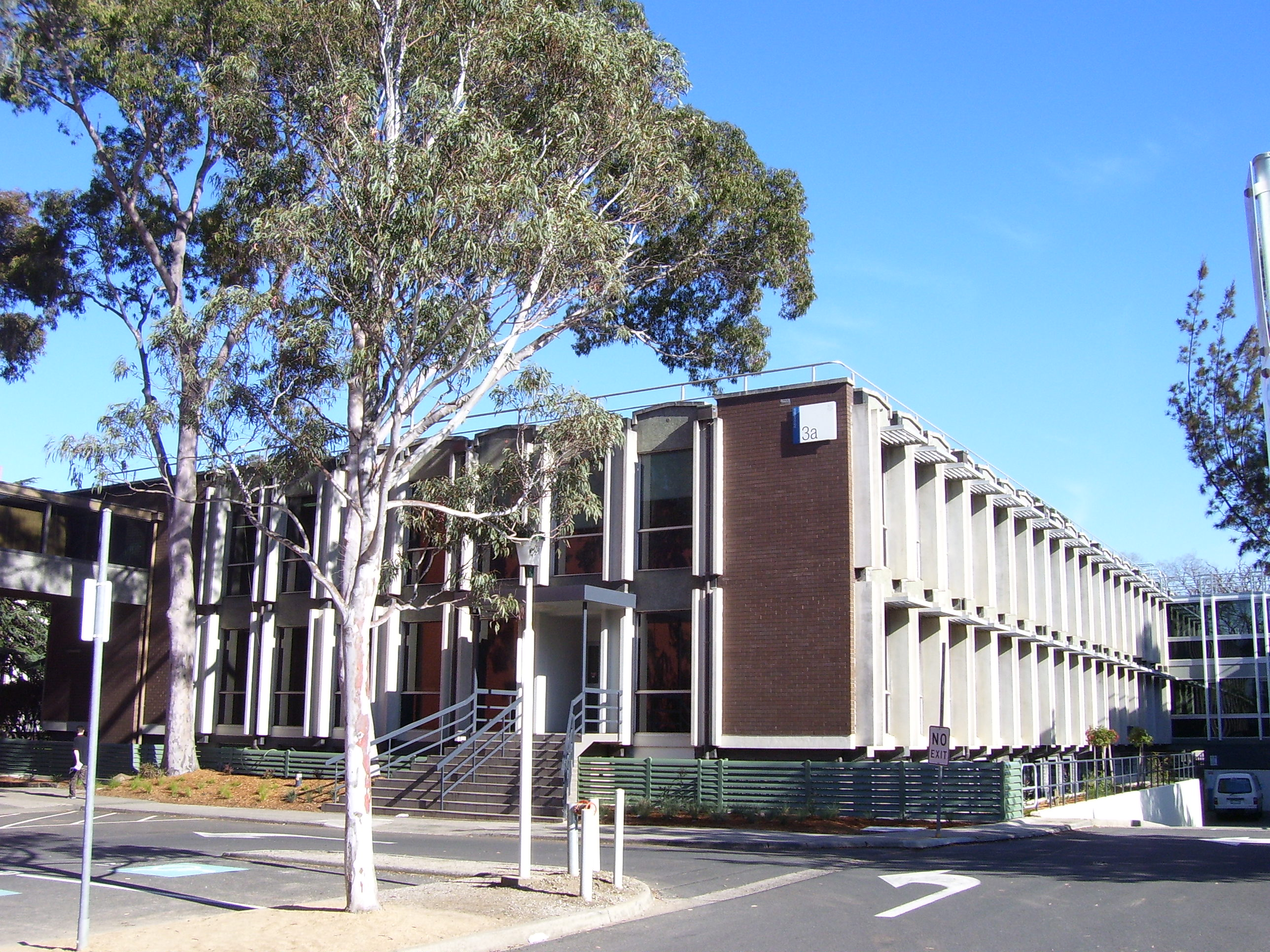
The Chancellory (building 3a)

The Monash University, Clayton campus is the main campus of Monash University located in Clayton, a south-eastern suburb of Melbourne, in Victoria, Australia. The campus is the largest of the university's campuses, both in terms of size—approximately 110 hectares (270 acres)—and student population—over 41,000 students as of 2017.

The campus was designated as a suburb and is one of the few university campuses in Australia to have its own postcode (3800), and shares the telephone number extension of 990 with the other city campuses of the university. The campus features a wide range of native Australian flora and fauna, including over 2,000 different kinds of plant life.

The campus contains the greatest density of high technology industries in Victoria. As well as the Australian Synchrotron, the Clayton campus is adjacent to CSIRO facilities, Bosch, Bayer, Agilent Technologies, and several other science and technology companies are also located nearby. The Clayton campus is also a short trip from Chadstone Shopping Centre, the largest shopping mall in the Southern Hemisphere.

== Faculties ==
Although many faculties have a presence on multiple campuses, the majority are based at Clayton, including the following faculties:

- Arts
- Business & Economics
- Education
- Engineering
- Information Technology
- Law
- Medicine, Nursing & Health Sciences
- Science
  - John Monash Science School

== Facilities ==
=== Research ===
The Clayton campus is home to large and sophisticated research facilities. The Australian Synchrotron, adjoining the campus, is one of the most recent and sophisticated of these. It is a 3 GeV synchrotron radiation facility that opened on 31 July 2007. It is capable of viewing matter at the molecular level using synchrotron light. Monash University contributed A$5 million towards the A$206 million cost of the synchrotron as a member of the funding partnership for the initial suite of beamlines.

The campus is also home to the Monash University Accident Research Centre, which includes an advanced driving simulator capable of simulating motor vehicle accidents. The campus also houses some of the world's largest regenerative medicine stem cell research facilities, including the Australian Stem Cell Centre, the Monash Immunology and Stem Cell Laboratories, the Monash Medical Research Institute and the Australian Regenerative Medicine Institute.

The Monash Antibody Technology Facility is also based at the campus, which contains the largest monoclonal antibody production facility in the Southern Hemisphere; and the campus contains the largest wind tunnel in the Southern Hemisphere.

The Hutton-Westfold Observatory is located adjacent to the Clayton campus. The observatory houses a Schmidt–Cassegrain telescope and has been operating since 2009.

Many of these facilities are located in the Monash Science Technology Research and Innovation Precinct (STRIP), a major development which houses corporate and university science and technology enterprises.

=== Heritage listings ===
Religious Centre
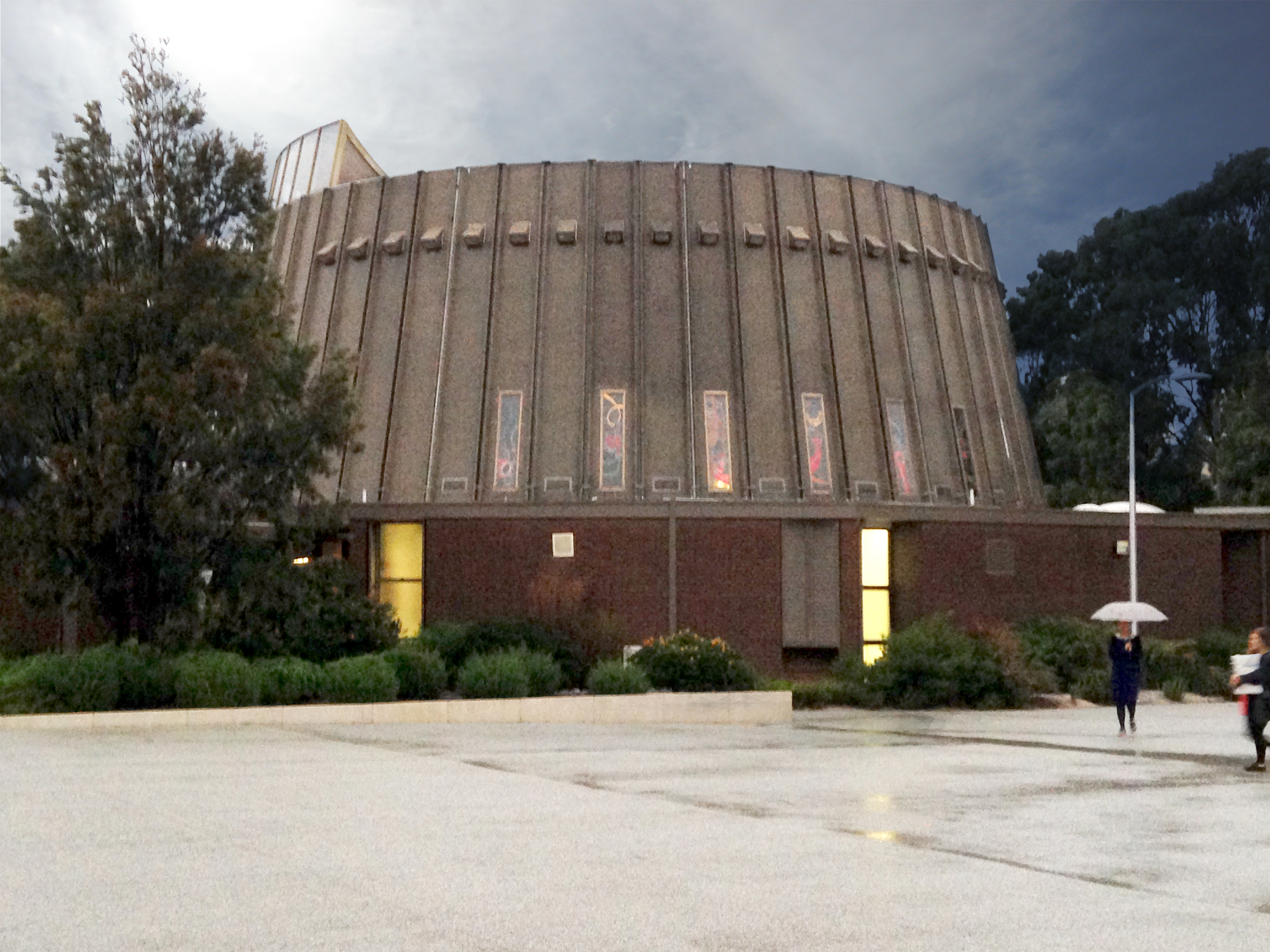
- The exterior of the centre, 2014
- Interactive map of Religious Centre
- 37°54′43″S 145°8′3″E
- Location: Building 9

History
- Built: 9 June 1968; 58 years ago

Site notes
- Architect: John Mockridge
- Architectural style: Ecclesiastical / Structuralist circular
- Website: monash.edu

Victorian Heritage Register
- Official name: Religious Centre, Monash University
- Type: Registered place
- Designated: 11 December 2008
- Reference no.: H2188
- Heritage overlay no.: HO88
- Category: Religion

Religious Centre

The Religious Centre, in building 9 in a central position on the campus, is an ecumenical space for religious groups. Completed in 1968, six years after the establishment of the campus, the centre was designed by John Mockridge and funded by the university via the Christian and Jewish communities of Melbourne. The circular form of the building is a symbol of unity, eternity and ecumenical feeling. With the growth of a significant non-Western student population, the centre has been used by other religious groups, particularly Muslim, Buddhist and Hindu communities. A pipe organ, made by Ronald Sharp, was installed in 1978 and is used for organ practice, choir rehearsals, concerts, weddings and funerals. The centre has a large central chapel with an altar and centre-aisle, a smaller second chapel, and other rooms and courtyards for various uses. Given the ecumenical use of the centre, there is limited religious iconography, although there are some stained-glass windows, designed by Les Kossatz and Leonard French. The centre was added to the Victorian Heritage Register on 11 December 2008 in recognition of its architectural, historical, aesthetic and social significance.

=== Sport ===
The Clayton campus has the most extensive sporting facilities of any of the university's campuses, used by the campus' many sporting clubs, as well as recreationally by staff and students.

Facilities at the campus include: five football and cricket ovals (including a pavilion), 12 tennis courts, eight squash courts, a hockey field and pavilion, an American football field, a baseball field and pavilion, 21 badminton and table tennis courts, a martial arts hall, a fencing cage, a boxing studio and ring, a 1,500-square-metre (16,000 sq ft) gym, an aerobics studio and two swimming pools.

=== Culture ===
Clayton campus hosts a range of cultural events throughout the year, including plays, musicals, concerts, exhibitions and conferences. Notable facilities include the Robert Blackwood Hall (with a capacity of 1,600 people), the Alexander Theatre (capacity of 508), the Student Theatre, and the Monash University Museum of Art.

The campus has three major academic libraries: the Louis Matheson Library (for arts and commerce), the Hargrave-Andrew Library (for engineering, science and technology), and the Law Library. It is also home to numerous smaller academic libraries, as well as the Student Union Recreational Library (formerly John Medley Library).

=== Social life ===
The campus is home to numerous restaurants, cafés and retail outlets, largely located in the Campus Centre.

The Notting Hill Hotel, known among students as The Nott, is a large pub, with three bars, two beer gardens and two bistros, located adjacent to the campus and forms a major part of the social life for students on campus. Founded in 1891 as a half way house for travellers, the pub boomed from the early 1960s after the establishment of Monash and, in 2003, covered 0.8 hectares (2.0 acres). The pub was owned and run by Australia's longest-serving publican, Kath Byer—known as the Reverend Mother by students—from 1936 until her death in 2010.

Monash Clayton also runs Host Scheme, the largest student-based orientation program in the Southern Hemisphere, established in 1974, and includes orientation camps, tours, BBQs, functions, festivals, and a party called Host Scheme Night, which is run during orientation week annually.

== Residential services ==
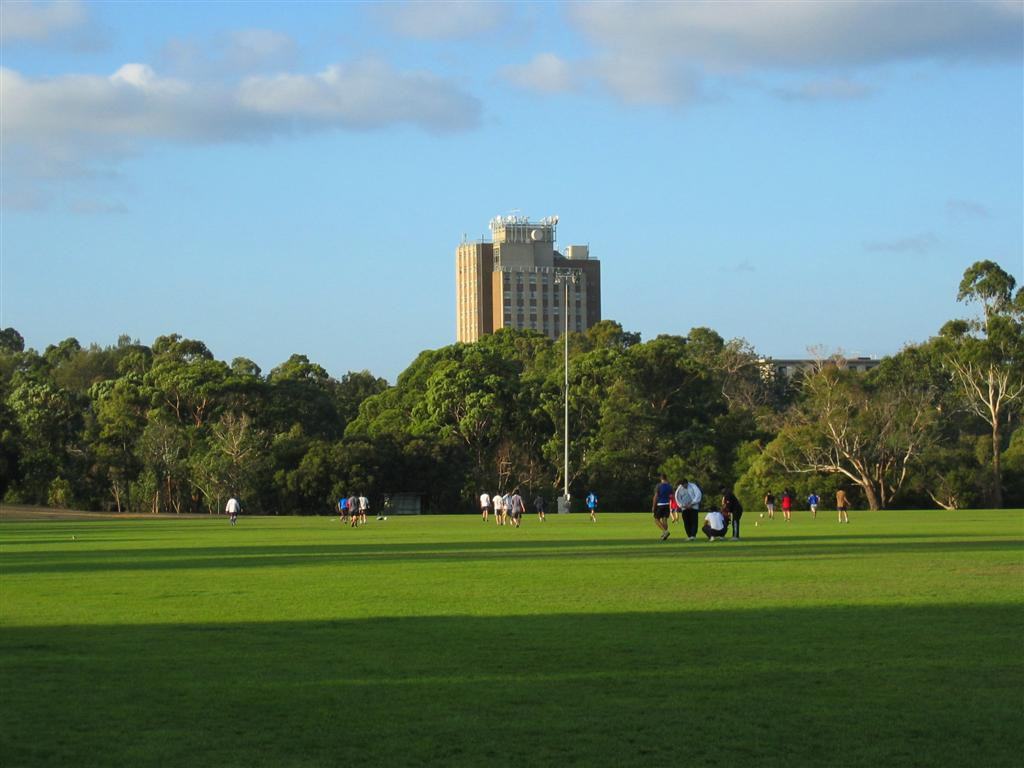
Howitt Hall, the site of Briggs Hall and Jackomos Hall

There are eleven residential halls on campus that accommodate approximately 3,000 students and staff; called: Deakin Hall, Farrer Hall, Howitt Hall, Richardson Hall, Roberts Hall, Briggs Hall, Jackomos Hall, Campbell Hall, Holman Hall, Logan Hall and Turner Hall, along with the South East Flats.

The Clayton campus is also affiliated with Mannix College, located adjacent to the university.

== Transport ==
The campus is accessible via several suburban bus routes, including the 630, 631, 703, 733, 737, 742, 802, 804, 862 and the SmartBus 900 routes. It is also accessible via the route 601 shuttle bus service which operates to commute solely between the campus and the nearby Huntingdale station. The university also operates inter-campus shuttle buses to its Caulfield and Peninsula campuses.

In 2018, the Victorian government announced that a new tram line would be constructed between Caulfield station and Rowville via Dandenong Road and Wellington Road, which would connect the Caulfield and Clayton campuses.

== Shootings ==
In 2002, Huan Yun Xiang, an international student, murdered by shooting two students and wounded several lecturers and students on the campus. He also stabbed a doctor after he was jailed in correctional hospital.

== See also ==
- Radio Monash
- Monash College
