= Jakarta International College =

Educational institution in Indonesia

- Type: Private
- Established: 2002
- Affiliations: Monash College
- Chairman: Wenny Mandagie Susanto
- Principal: Fransisca Laij
- Location: Jakarta, Indonesia; 6°11′51″S 106°49′29″E
- Campus: Letjen S. Parman St No.1AA, Slipi, Palmerah, West Jakarta City, Jakarta 11480
- Website: www.jic.ac.id
- Location within Jakarta

Jakarta International College (also known as Monash College Jakarta or JIC), founded in 2002, is an Indonesian international college set up for students who wish to further their university education overseas. JIC offers four internationally recognized education programs that help students transition from high school to university, namely Monash College Diploma Program, Monash University Foundation Year (MUFY), Monash English Bridging Program (MEB) and Pathway to American Degree Program.

== Campus ==
Jakarta International College campus is located on the second floor of the Graha Mandiri Building. The campus encompasses 18 classes, from lecture rooms to small classes suitable for group discussions and more personal tutorial sessions. Each class is equipped with whiteboard, computer, and a projector. The campus facilities include library, canteen, wi-fi internet coverage and student lounge.

Located in the business district of Jakarta, Menteng is an international community with numerous foreign embassies and one of the safest areas in Jakarta, JIC is situated in a location off the 3-in-1 route and can be accessed by public transport. The campus is walking distance with a shopping mall, five-star hotels, residential areas and restaurants.

== Location ==
JIC was established in 2002 and is the first and the only Monash College in Indonesia. Since its establishment, more than 1200 students have enrolled and graduated from the college and transferred into universities in Australia.
