= Alan Trounson =

Australian embryologist (born 1946)

Alan Trounson AO
- Born: 16 February 1946 (age 80); Australia
- Education: University of New South Wales; University of Sydney; Cambridge University
- Known for: Procedural improvements that increased the success of in-vitro fertilisation; Discovery that nerve stem cells could be derived from embryonic stem cells
- Spouses: Sue Trounson (?) (div.); Karin Hammarberg
- Children: 4
- Awards: Wellcome Australia Medal (1991); David deKretser Medal (2009); Monash University Research Medal (2009); Patrick Steptoe Medal (1994); Bertarelli Foundation Medal (2004); Barbara Eck Menning Medal (1997)
- Scientific career
- Fields: Embryology; Stem cell research
- Workplaces: California Institute for Regenerative Medicine (2007–2014); Monash University; Australian Stem Cell Centre
- Thesis: (1974)

Alan Osborne Trounson AO (born 16 February 1946) is an Australian embryologist who has made contributions to human in vitro fertilisation (IVF), embryonic stem cell research, and regenerative medicine. He is an Emeritus Professor at Monash University, a Distinguished Scientist at the Hudson Institute of Medical Research, and the founder, CEO, and Executive Chair of Evinco Therapeutics. Trounson served as President of the California Institute for Regenerative Medicine (CIRM), California's $3 billion stem cell agency, from 2007 to 2014.

== Early life and education ==
Trounson grew up in rural New South Wales, where he frequently visited school friends' farms and developed a love of animals, dreaming of becoming a farmer. He ultimately followed his father's advice, along with the attraction of multiple scholarships, and chose to study wool technology at the University of New South Wales rather than veterinary science. He received a Master of Science from the University of New South Wales in 1971, researching the physiology and genetics of multiple births in sheep. He subsequently earned a PhD from the University of Sydney in 1974, with a thesis titled "Studies on the Development of Fertilized Sheep Ova". From 1971 to 1976, Trounson was a Dalgety Fellow at the Australian Research Council's Institute of Animal Physiology and Biochemistry at the University of Cambridge. There he focused on cattle embryo freezing, embryo transfer, and embryo biology. He developed nonsurgical embryo collection and transfer techniques in cattle and pioneered embryo splitting and freezing in farm animals, techniques that later became the foundation of the global sheep and cattle reproductive technology industry.

== Career ==
=== Monash University and IVF research ===
In 1977, Carl Wood, a pioneer of in vitro fertilization (IVF) and founder of Monash IVF, invited Trounson to join his research team at Monash University. Although Trounson initially expected to work in IVF for only about a year, he became a major contributor to the development of human assisted reproductive technology.

At Monash, Trounson and his colleagues contributed to several advances in IVF, including controlled ovarian stimulation and the collection of multiple oocytes, embryo cryopreservation, egg and embryo donation, sperm microinjection, embryo biopsy for genetic and chromosomal analysis, in vitro maturation of oocytes, and vitrification of eggs and embryos. The Monash team was involved in 14 of the first 16 IVF births worldwide, and in 1980 Australia’s first IVF baby was born following the team's work.

Trounson was appointed Reader in Obstetrics and Gynaecology at Monash University in 1984 and became Director of the Centre for Early Human Development in 1985. He was appointed to a Personal Chair in Obstetrics, Gynaecology and Paediatrics in 1991 and later held a Personal Chair in Stem Cell Sciences.

=== Embryonic Stem Cell Research ===
In the mid-1990s, Trounson's research focus shifted from reproductive medicine to stem cells. He explained: "I became interested in studying hESCs as a way of exploring cell differentiation beyond the blastocyst stage." After Dr. James Thomson published his paper on the establishment of hESC lines in Science in 1998, Trounson submitted multiple grant applications to the Australian government, which "completely changed the whole direction of my research."

In 2000, his team published a groundbreaking paper in Nature Biotechnology reporting the derivation of pluripotent embryonic stem cell lines from human blastocysts. The paper has been cited over 3,000 times. At the Monash Immunology and Stem Cell Laboratories (MISCL), his laboratory made several major advances, including the production and characterization of new embryonic stem cell lines, controlled differentiation of hESCs into pure nerve cells, and directed differentiation of mouse and human ESCs into respiratory, hepatic, and thymic progenitor lineages

=== Australian Stem Cell Centre ===
Trounson was the founder and Executive Vice Chairman of the Australian Stem Cell Centre (ASCC), established in 2002 as the National Biotechnology Centre of Excellence. He left the ASCC in 2003 due to disagreements over the centre's commercialization focus.

=== California Institute for Regenerative Medicine ===
In 2007, Trounson was appointed president of the California Institute for Regenerative Medicine (CIRM), which had been established by California voters through Proposition 71 to fund stem cell research.

During his tenure, CIRM introduced or expanded several programs, including the Bridges and Creativity training programs, the Alpha Clinics initiative for translating experimental therapies into clinical care, the Stem Cell Genomics program, and an induced pluripotent stem cell (iPS cell) bank for research into complex diseases. Trounson served as CIRM president for nearly six years. In October 2013, he announced that he would step down from the position and return to Australia to spend more time with his family.

=== Biotechnology Entrepreneurship and Recent Work ===
Trounson has founded eight companies and one foundation, the latter providing low-cost IVF treatment in Africa. Cartherics Pty Ltd was founded by Trounson in 2016 to develop Chimeric Antigen Receptor Technology (CAR-T)/T Cell Receptor (TCR) therapies using induced Pluripotent Stem Cells (iPSCs) as an off-the-shelf approach for treating cancer. The company is located at the Translation Research Facility Building, Monash Medical Centre, Clayton, Victoria. In 2025, Trounson handed over the CEO role to Dr. Ian Nisbet and became Deputy Chair of the Board. Evinco Therapeutics was spun out of Cartherics in December 2025 to develop advanced immune-based therapies for neurological disorders. Its initial research program involves extracellular vesicles (EVs) derived from natural killer (NK) cells, delivered intranasally to target Alzheimer's disease and other neuroinflammatory conditions.

=== Academic Positions and Honours Academic Positions ===
- Emeritus Professor, Monash University (2008–present)
- Distinguished Scientist, Hudson Institute of Medical Research
- Personal Chair in Obstetrics/Gynaecology and Paediatrics, Monash University (1991)
- Personal Chair in Stem Cell Science, Monash University (2003)
- Director, Centre for Early Human Development (1985)
- Director, Monash Institute of Reproduction and Development
- Founding Director, Monash Immunology and Stem Cell Laboratories (MISCL)
- Associate Editor, Stem Cells journal

== Honours and Awards ==
- Axel Munthe International Prize in Reproduction (nomination, 1982)
- Wellcome (Australia) Medal and Award (1991/1992)
- Patrick Steptoe Memorial Medal, British Fertility Society (1994)
- Benjamin Henry Sheares Medal, Obstetrical and Gynaecological Society of Singapore (1995)
- Barbara Eck Menning Medal, RESOLVE USA (1997)
- International Academy of Reproductive Medicine Award (1999)
- Centenary Medal, Governor-General of Australia (2003)
- Bertarelli Foundation Award in Reproductive Health (2004)
- David deKretser Medal (2009)
- Monash University Research Medal (2009)
- Australian Humanist of the Year (2003)
- Honorary Doctorate, Vrije Universiteit Brussel (2003)
- Honorary Doctor of Laws, Monash University (2011)
- Fellow ad eundem, Royal College of Obstetricians and Gynaecologists (2007)
- Honorary Fellow, Royal Australian and New Zealand College of Obstetricians and Gynaecologists
- Officer of the Order of Australia (AO, 2021)

== Controversy ==
In August 2002, Monash University asked Trounson to stop publicly discussing embryo and stem cell research due to sensitivities surrounding a A$43.5 million government grant approved three months earlier. His "offence" was showing a video of a paralysed rat that had regained the ability to walk with the help of embryonic stem cell research. Trounson told The Lancet that there was no intent to deceive, but that he had mistakenly overestimated the audience's knowledge. He explained: "These cells were embryonic germ cells—often defined as embryonic stem cells, they behave like embryonic stem cells, but they were taken from 6–8-week-old embryos, not 1-week-old embryos. In hindsight, I should have defined them strictly—which is sometimes a problem when discussing science with a lay audience.".

== Research Areas ==
Trounson's research interests include cloning, stem cells, biotechnology, cloning for the agricultural industry, gene storage, and in vitro fertilisation. His clinical translation work includes reviews of stem cell therapies in clinical trials, noting that autologous and allogeneic transplants have shown few safety issues, that limbal stem cells have been registered in Europe for treating eye burns, and that mesenchymal stem cells have been approved in Canada and New Zealand for pediatric graft-versus-host disease. His research output includes 168 articles, 46 abstracts, and 22 book chapters. Scopus data shows 504 documents, an h-index of 86, and 31,174 citations.

== Documentary and media ==
In 2007, Magic Lantern Media Inc produced a documentary about Trounson titled Genetics, Stem Cells and Society, featuring an interview with Trounson covering his beginnings in science, his pioneering IVF work, and his leadership role in embryonic stem cell research.

== Books ==
- Trounson, Alan O.; Wood, Carl (1984). In Vitro Fertilization and Embryo Transfer. ISBN 978-0-443-02675-1.
- Sathananthan, A. Henry; Trounson, Alan O.; Wood, Carl (November 1985). Atlas of Fine Structure of Human Sperm Penetration, Eggs, and Embryos Cultured in Vitro. Praeger. ISBN 978-0-03-000113-0.
- Wood, Carl; Trounson, Alan O., eds. (1988). Clinical in Vitro Fertilization. Springer. ISBN 978-3-540-19534-4.
- Gianaroli, L.; Campana, A. (1994). Trounson, Alan O. (ed.). Implantation in Mammals. Vol. 91. Raven Press. ISBN 978-0-88167-905-2.
- Trounson, Alan O.; Gardner, David K., eds. (1999). Handbook of in vitro fertilisation (2nd ed.). ISBN 978-0-8493-4002-4.
- Trounson, Alan O.; Gosden, Roger G., eds. (25 August 2003). Biology and Pathology of the Oocyte: Its Role in Fertility and Reproductive Medicine. Cambridge University Press. ISBN 978-0-521-79958-4.
- Verma, Paul J.; Trounson, Alan O. (2006). Nuclear Transfer Protocols: Cell Reprogramming and Transgenesis. Springer. ISBN 978-1-58829-280-3.

== Articles ==
- Lutjen, Peter; Trounson, Alan; Leeton, John; Findlay, Jock; Wood, Carl; Renou, Peter (1984). "The establishment and maintenance of pregnancy using in vitro fertilization and embryo donation in a patient with primary ovarian failure". Nature. 307 (5947): 174–175. Bibcode:1984Natur.307..174L. doi:10.1038/307174a0. ISSN 0028-0836. PMID 6690997.
- Trounson, Alan; Mohr, Linda (1983). "Human pregnancy following cryopreservation, thawing and transfer of an eight-cell embryo". Nature. 305 (5936): 707–709. Bibcode:1983Natur.305..707T. doi:10.1038/305707a0. ISSN 0028-0836. PMID 6633637.
- Lutjen, Peter; Trounson, Alan; Leeton, John; Findlay, Jock; Wood, Carl; Renou, Peter (1984). "The establishment and maintenance of pregnancy using in vitro fertilization and embryo donation in a patient with primary ovarian failure". Nature. 307 (5947): 174–175. Bibcode:1984Natur.307..174L. doi:10.1038/307174a0. ISSN 0028-0836. PMID 6690997.
- Trounson, Alan; Wood, Carl; Kausche, Annette (1994). "In vitro maturation and the fertilization and developmental competence of oocytes recovered from untreated polycystic ovarian patients". Fertility and Sterility. 62 (2): 353–362. doi:10.1016/s0015-0282(16)56891-5. ISSN 0015-0282. PMID 8034085.
- Kuleshova, Lilia; Gianaroli, Luca; Magli, Cristina; Ferraretti, Anna; Trounson, Alan (1999). "Birth following vitrification of a small number of human oocytes: Case Report". Human Reproduction. 14 (12): 3077–3079. doi:10.1093/humrep/14.12.3077. ISSN 1460-2350. PMID 10601099.
- Reubinoff, Benjamin E.; Pera, Martin F.; Fong, Chui-Yee; Trounson, Alan; Bongso, Ariff (2000). "Embryonic stem cell lines from human blastocysts: somatic differentiation in vitro". Nature Biotechnology. 18 (4): 399–404. Bibcode:2000NatBi..18..399R. doi:10.1038/74447. ISSN 1087-0156. PMID 10748519.
