= Hutton-Westfold Observatory =

Coordinates: 37°54′38″S 145°7′53″E

Hutton-Westfold Observatory is an observatory for Monash University located on Martin Street near the Clayton Campus, in Melbourne, Victoria, Australia.

It opened to the public on 23 March 2009. The name Hutton-Westfold is derived from the names of Don Hutton and Kevin Westfold who contributed to the field of astronomy as well as the education of students at Monash. The observatory houses a 27.5cm aperture Schmidt-Cassegrain Telescope, which has a field of view of approximately 7'×5' (7 arcminutes by 5 arcminutes).

== See also ==
- List of astronomical observatories
