= Farrer Hall (Monash University) =

- Monash University
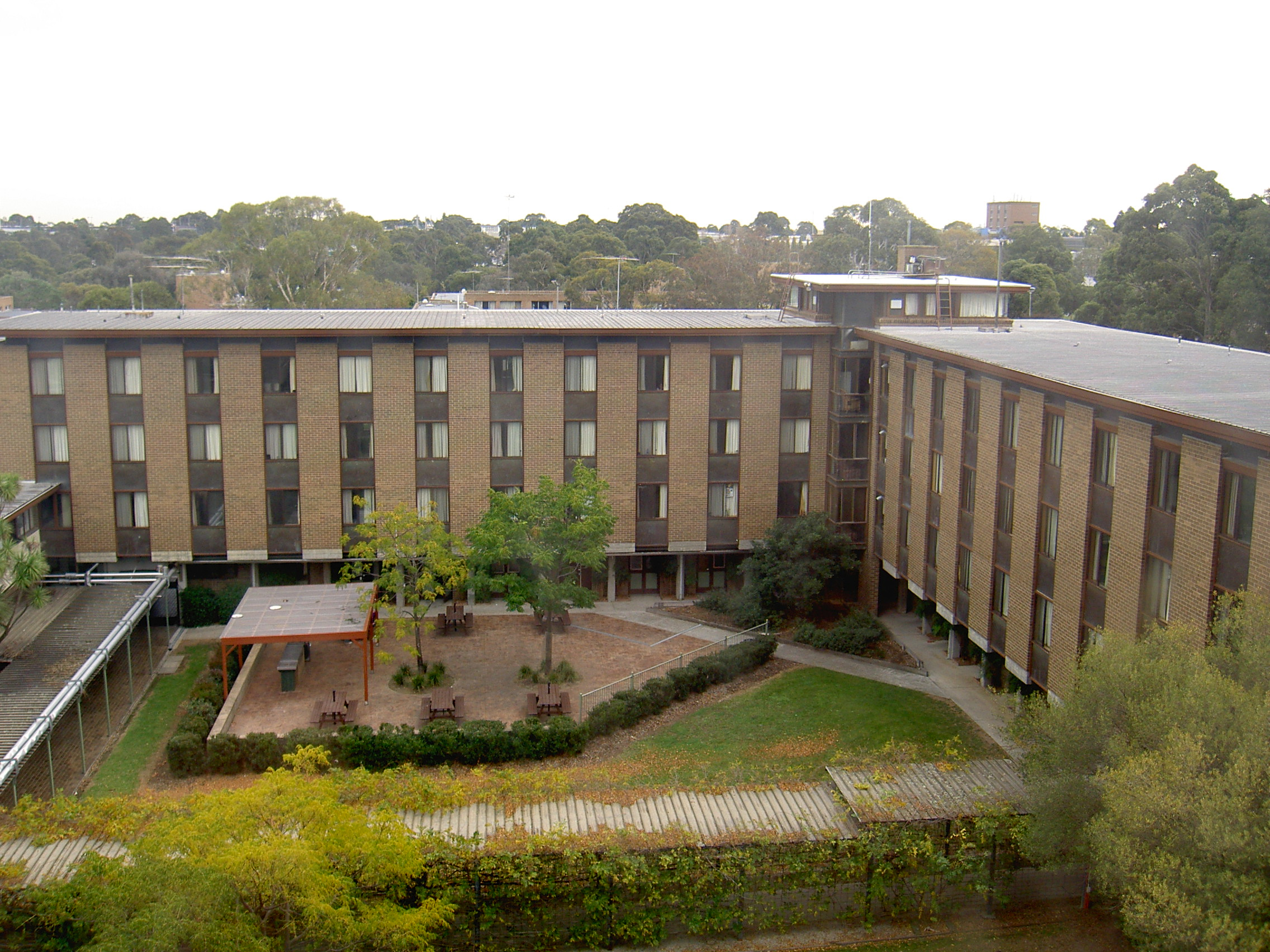
- Farrer Hall
- Location: 62 College Way, Victoria
- Coordinates: 37.907243°S 145.140204°E
- Motto: No Ferret Left Behind
- Established: 1965
- Architect: Chancellor and Patrick
- Architectural style: "Wrightian"
- Colours: Green and Black
- Membership: 200 residents
- Website: www.monash.edu/accommodation/accommodation/on-campus-options/clayton-residential-village/farrer-hall

Farrer Hall is the second oldest of the residential colleges of Monash University, located in the city of Melbourne, Victoria, Australia. Founded in 1965, Farrer Hall is today a fully co-educational institution and home to 200 residents, a third of which are usually first year students. The Hall has two separate wings traditionally known as 'Commons' and 'Lords'.

== History ==
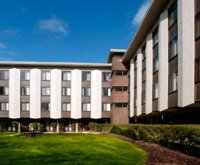
Farrer Hall opened in 1965 following the establishment of Deakin Hall in 1962 ('Old Deakin' pictured)

Farrer Hall was named after William Farrer. Its founding warden was Mr M. G. A. Wilson. The original building was known as the 'Men's Wing' and opened in May 1965. The 'Women's Wing"' was completed shortly after. University archives record that it was "hoped that by the end of this year (1965) Farrer Hall should reach its capacity of one hundred and eighty-seven students".

Farrer Hall’s separate men's and women's wings were similar to the original accommodation arrangements at neighbouring Deakin Hall, the oldest of Monash's halls of residence. Although Deakin Hall was the first Australian hall of residence to have men and women students living together in the same building, some segregation was evident in Deakin's early years with "the first floor housing women and the two upper floors men, with all other areas being common". Both Deakin and Farrer Hall were designed with a "faintly Wrightian theme" by Chancellor and Patrick. Deakin Hall's original wing, 'Old Deakin', was officially opened in 1962 by Mrs Herbert Brookes accompanied by her sisters, Lady White and Lady Rivett. The three sisters were daughters of former Prime Minister of Australia Alfred Deakin.

Adjoining the two separate three-storey buildings, soon known as 'Commons' and 'Lords', was Farrer's own dining hall. Deakin Hall, Howitt Hall, Roberts Hall and Richardson Hall also had their own dining halls and the accompanying High Table culture for many years.

In 1966, Farrer Hall had a Matron and Deakin Hall had a Steward who were responsible for the domestic arrangements within their respective Halls.

The planned celebrations for Farrer Hall's 50th anniversary included an afternoon tea event for Farrer alumni and the recreation of one of the iconic images of Farrer Hall: the 1965 photograph which included the Hall's first warden Murray Wilson mounted on his horse. This homage included the 2015 College Head (Steve Mitchell) sitting atop his ‘horse’, while other members of the community attempted to recreate the look of others in the 1965 photo. After a little manipulation of the background (removing 50 years of development), the outcome was "both humorous and a fitting tribute to the pioneers of Farrer Hall".

== Operating structure ==
The hall contains a main common room, several kitchens open to use by individuals or small groups, study centre, social room, poolroom, music and TV rooms and a secure bicycle enclosure. Each floor of each building, along with bathroom and laundry, has a small lounge with facilities for self-catering. In 'Commons', one room and a bathroom have been modified for the use of residents with a physical disability. Most of Farrer's facilities and activities are coordinated by the Resident Advisors and students. In the general life of the Hall, especially the social life, a leading role is played by the elected executive committee of the Farrer Hall Society, of which all residents are members. There is also a Floor Representatives' group comprising one student from each floor, and this group meets approximately twice a semester with the College Head and Deputy College Head to discuss the needs of students in the Hall. Farrer Hall residents can dine daily – lunch and dinner – in the adjoining Halls Cafe.
