= Monash Science Technology Research and Innovation Precinct =

Coordinates: 37°54′40″S 145°07′45″E

The Monash Science Technology Research and Innovation Precinct (STRIP) is a cluster of commercial and university enterprises and research centres based at Monash University's Clayton Campus. The STRIP was officially opened on 18 February 2010 by Nobel laureate Professor Elizabeth Blackburn.

Monash STRIP houses many of Australia's major scientific research centres and companies, including the Australian Stem Cell Centre (Australia's National Biotechnology Centre of Excellence), Stem Cell Sciences Pty Ltd, Nanovic (Nanotechnology Victoria), the Victorian Institute of Chemical Sciences, the National Printing Laboratory, the Australian Regenerative Medicine Institute and the Monash Immunology and Stem Cell Laboratories. It is also home to many of the university's departments within the School of Biomedical Sciences, namely microbiology, biochemistry and molecular biology, as well as anatomy and developmental biology.

The John Monash Science School, a selective secondary school for students with a high aptitude for mathematics and sciences, is located adjacent to the STRIP.

The location of the cluster – Clayton – places it in the centre of Melbourne's south-eastern suburbs. This area contains the greatest density of high technology industries in Victoria. As more and more businesses develop within the STRIP, it is anticipated that adjacent university land will be used to accommodate increased industry presence. Other research facilities at the Clayton Campus include the ANSTO's Australian Synchrotron and the CSIRO, which are both closely involved with some of the tenants at Monash STRIP.

The STRIP 2 buildings won the 2009 Master Builders Award for Excellence in Construction, in the category of commercial buildings between $30m–$80m.
