= Monash University =

Public university based in Melbourne, Australia

- Coat of arms (Note: The coat of arms was granted on 20 November 1963.)
- Motto: Italian: Ancora imparo
- Motto in English: "I am still learning"
- Named after: Sir John Monash
- Type: Public research university
- Established: 30 May 1958; 68 years ago
- Accreditation: TEQSA
- Affiliations: Group of Eight; APRU
- Budget: A$3.25 billion (2023)
- Visitor: Governor of Victoria
- Chancellor: Megan Clark
- Vice-Chancellor: Sharon Pickering
- Academic staff: 9,737 (FTE, 2023)
- Administrative staff: 9,232 (FTE, 2023)
- Total staff: 20,227 (FTE, 2023)
- Students: 86,558 (2023)
- Undergraduates: 56,996 (2023)
- Postgraduates: 23,462 coursework (2023); 5,634 research (2023)
- Other students: 466 (2023)
- Location: Melbourne, Victoria, Australia; 37.9083°S 145.138°E
- Campus: 110 hectares (271.8 acres) (Main campus); Metropolitan with multiple sites
- Colours: Blue Black
- Nickname: Team Monash
- Sporting affiliations: UniSport; EAEN
- Mascot: Dayton the Robot
- Website: monash.edu

Monash University (/ˈmɒnæʃ/) is a public research university based in Melbourne, Victoria, Australia. Named after World War I general Sir John Monash, it was founded in 1958. The university has a number of campuses, four of which are in Victoria (Clayton, Caulfield, Peninsula, and Parkville), one in Malaysia and another one in Indonesia. Monash has a research and teaching centre in Prato, Italy, a graduate research school in Mumbai, India, and graduate schools in Suzhou, China, and Tangerang, Indonesia.

Monash hosts a number of research facilities, including the Monash Law School, the Australian Synchrotron, the Monash Science Technology Research and Innovation Precinct (STRIP), the Australian Stem Cell Centre, Victorian College of Pharmacy, and 100 research centres and 17 co-operative research centres. In 2019, its revenue was over $2.72 billion (AUD), with external research income around $462 million. In 2019, Monash enrolled over 55,000 undergraduate and over 25,000 postgraduate students.

Monash is a member of Australia's Group of Eight research universities, a member of the ASAIHL, and is the only Australian member of the M8 Alliance of Academic Health Centers, Universities and National Academies. It is one of the Australian universities ranked in the École des Mines de Paris (Mines ParisTech) ranking on the basis of the number of alumni listed among CEOs in the 500 largest worldwide companies.

== History ==
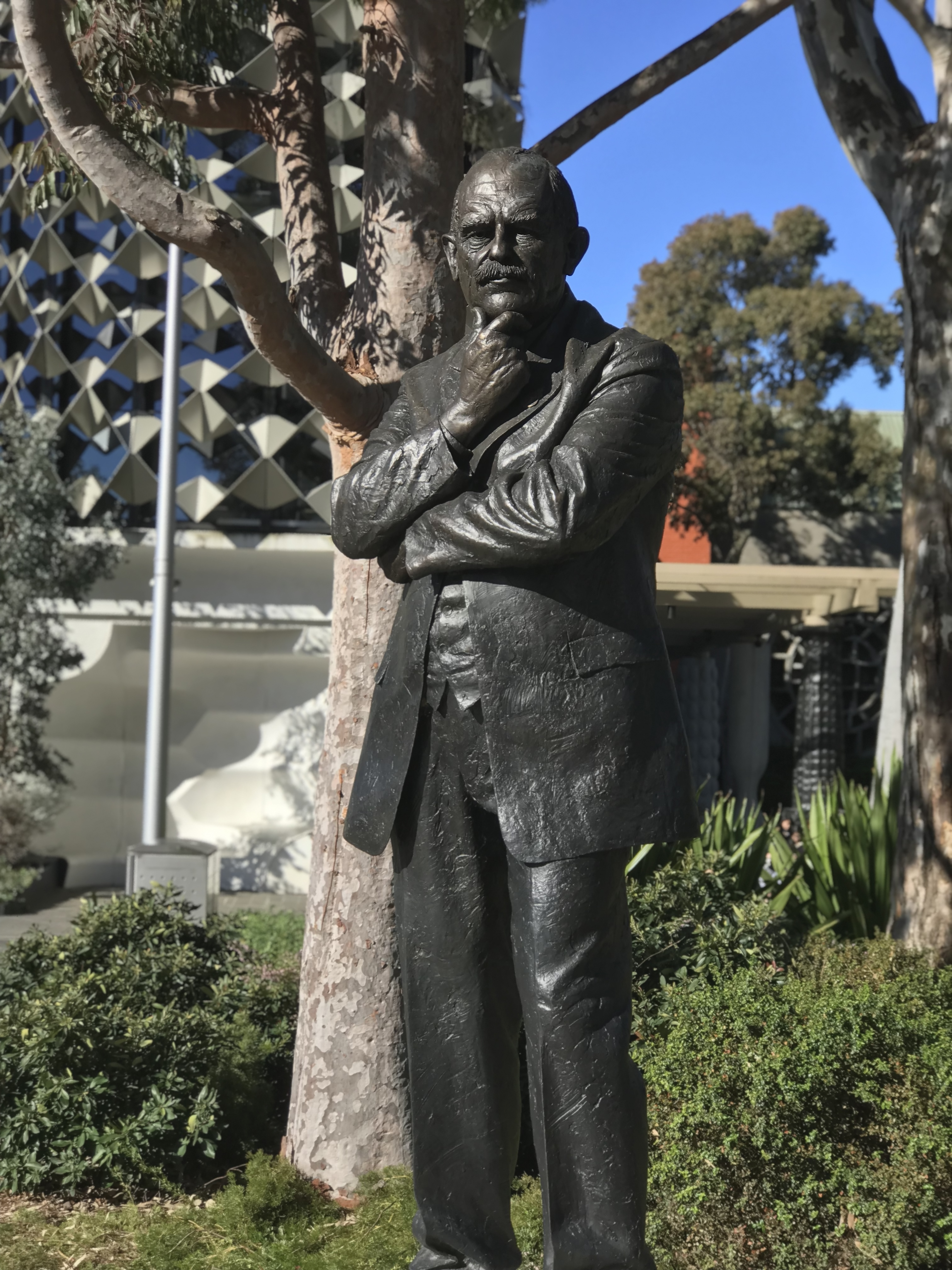
Statue of Sir John Monash at the Clayton Campus

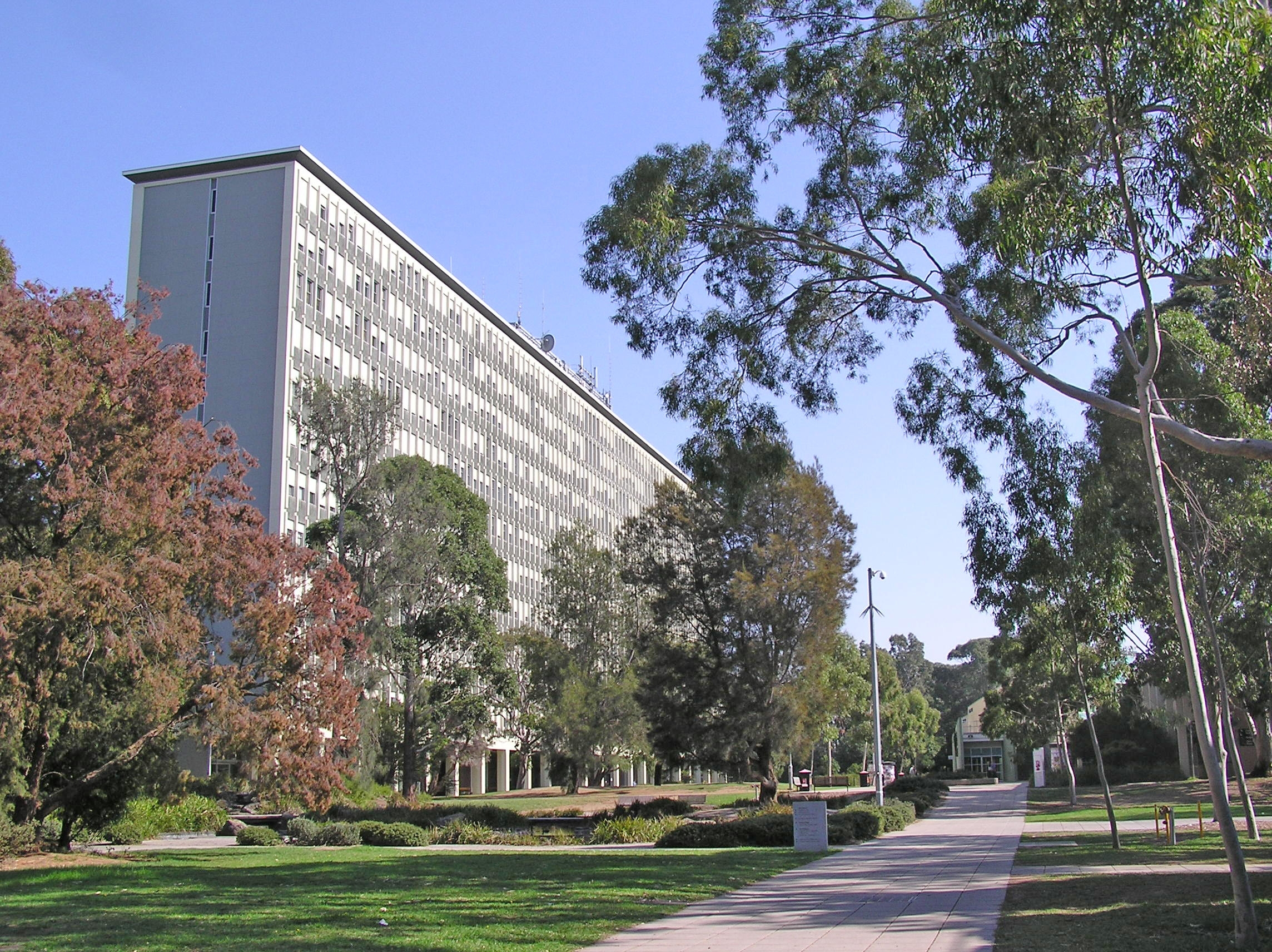
The Robert Menzies Building at the Clayton Campus

=== Early history: 1950s ===
Established by the Monash University Act 1958 (No. 6184 (Vic)), the original campus was in the suburb of Clayton where the university was granted an expansive site of 100 hectares of open land. The 100 hectares of land consisted of farmland and included the former Talbot Epileptic Colony. The Tudor-style farmhouse built by the O'Shea family became the original Vice-Chancellor's House—now University House.

In 1961, the university enrolled 357 students at Clayton. By 1967, enrollment reached 21,000 students. In its early years, it offered undergraduate and postgraduate degrees in engineering, medicine, science, arts, economics, politics, education, and law. It was a major provider for international student places under the Colombo Plan, which saw the first Asian students enter the Australian education system.

The university was named after the prominent Australian general Sir John Monash. This was the first time in Australia that a university had been named after a person, rather than a city or state.

=== 1970s onwards ===
From the mid-1960s to the early 1970s, Monash became the centre of student radicalism in Australia. It was the site of many mass student demonstrations, particularly concerning Australia's role in the Vietnam War and conscription. By the late 1960s, several student organisations, some of which were influenced by or supporters of communism, turned their focus to Vietnam, with numerous blockades and sit-ins. In an event later known as the Monash Siege, students forced then Prime Minister Malcolm Fraser to hide in a basement at the Alexander Theatre, in a major protest over the Whitlam dismissal.

In the late 1970s and 1980s, some of Monash's most publicised research came through its pioneering of in-vitro fertilisation (IVF). Led by Carl Wood and Alan Trounson, the Monash IVF Program achieved the world's first clinical IVF pregnancy in 1973. In 1980, they delivered the first IVF baby in Australia.

In the late 1980s, the Dawkins Reforms changed the landscape of higher education in Australia. Under the leadership of Vice-Chancellor Mal Logan, Monash expanded further. In 1988, Monash University had only one campus in Clayton, with around 15,000 students. Around a decade later, it had 8 campuses (including 2 overseas), a European research and teaching centre, and more than 50,000 students, making it the largest and most internationalised Australian university.

=== Expansion in the 1990s ===
In 1990, a series of mergers between Monash, the Chisholm Institute of Technology, and the Gippsland Institute of Advanced Education began. In 1991 a merger with the Victorian College of Pharmacy created a new faculty of the university. This continued in 1994, with the establishment of the Berwick campus.

In 1998, the university opened the Malaysia campus, its first overseas campus and the first foreign university in Malaysia. In 2001, Monash South Africa opened in Roodepoort, Johannesburg, the first foreign university in South Africa. The same year, the university secured an 18th-century Tuscan palace to open a research and teaching centre in Prato, Italy.

An increase in international students and the university's expansion contributed to increased income throughout the 1990s. It has since ranked as one of Australia's top 200 exporters.

=== 2000 onwards ===
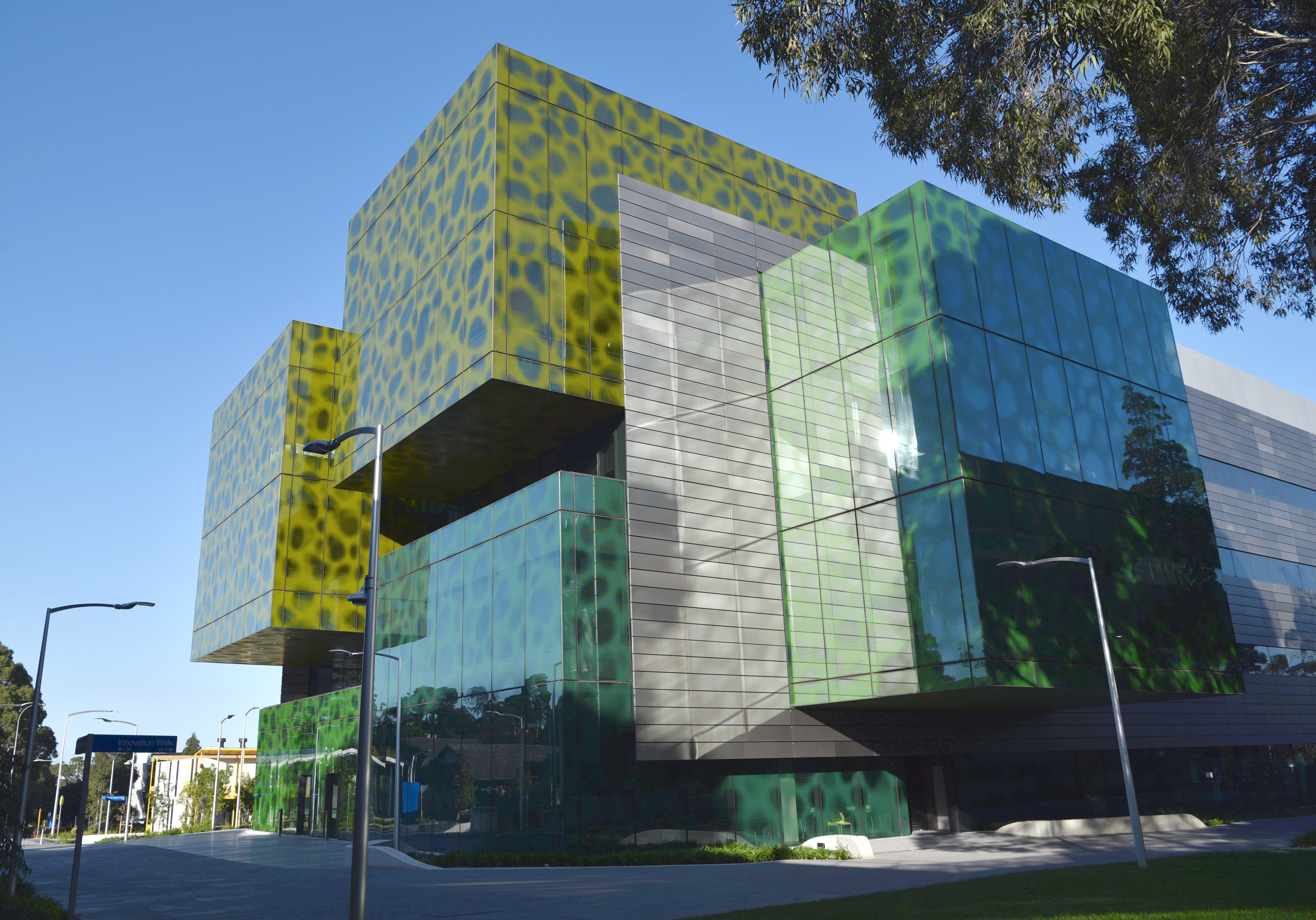
The Biomedical Learning and Teaching Building at Clayton Campus

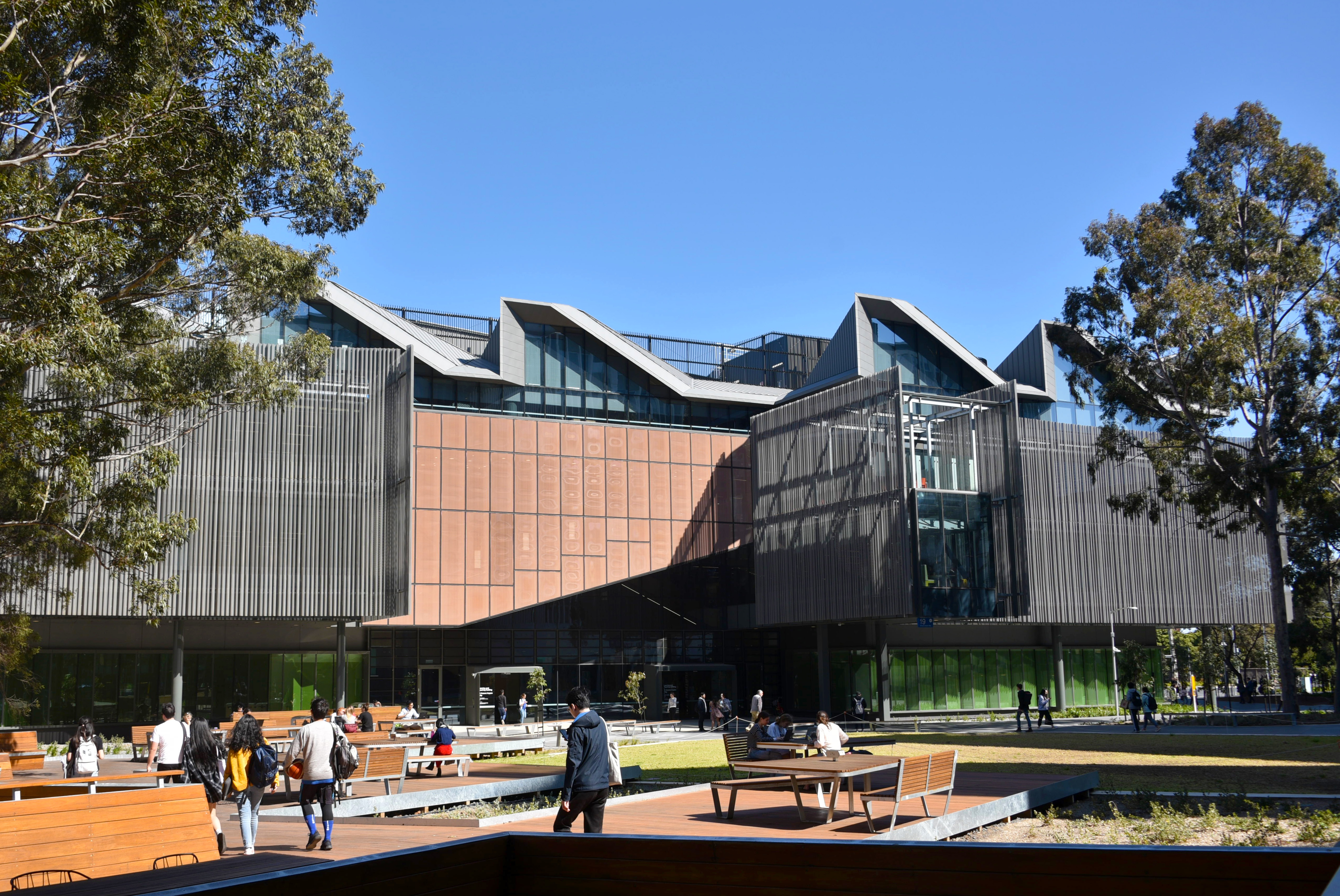
The Learning and Teaching Building at Clayton Campus

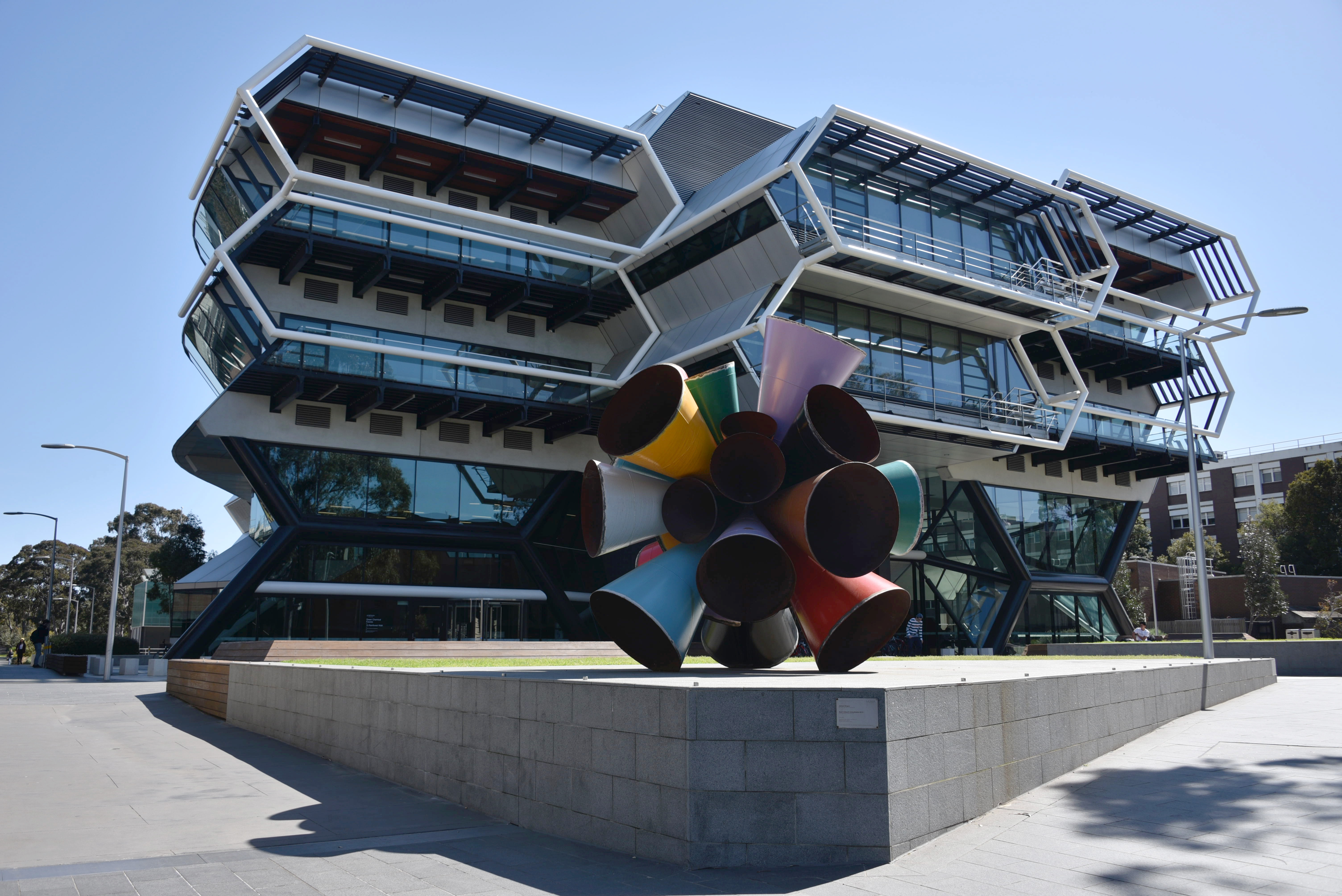
The Green Chemical Futures Building at Clayton Campus

In recent years, the university has been prominent in medical research. In 2000, when Alan Trounson led the team of scientists which announced to the world that nerve stem cells could be derived from embryonic stem cells, a discovery which led to a dramatic increase in interest in the potential of stem cells. It has also led to Monash being ranked in the top 20 universities in the world for biomedicine.

On 21 October 2002, Huan Yun "Allen" Xiang, shot two people dead and injured five others on the Clayton campus.

Since December 2011, Monash has had a global alliance with the University of Warwick in the United Kingdom.

In 2014, the university ceded its Gippsland campus to Federation University. On 15 July 2016, Monash confirmed that Federation University Australia would take over the operations of the Berwick campus prior to the end of 2018.

In 2019, the university sold its Monash South Africa campus to Advtech. Students who were on schedule to complete their degree on time would still receive a degree from Monash University after the sale. The reason for the sale was reported to be low profitability and low enrolment numbers. Prior to the sale, Monash University had sidelined the South African campus on its official websites and did not refer to it as a 'campus' unlike Monash Malaysia.

Monash announced an Indonesian campus in December 2020. The university plans to open its campus doors in October 2021, located in BSD City, Tangerang, Banten. Unlike Monash Malaysia, Monash Indonesia will focus on graduate studies including hosting the Institute for Advanced Research, supported by the Indonesian Scholarship and Research Support Foundation.

== Campuses and buildings ==
=== Australia ===
==== Clayton ====
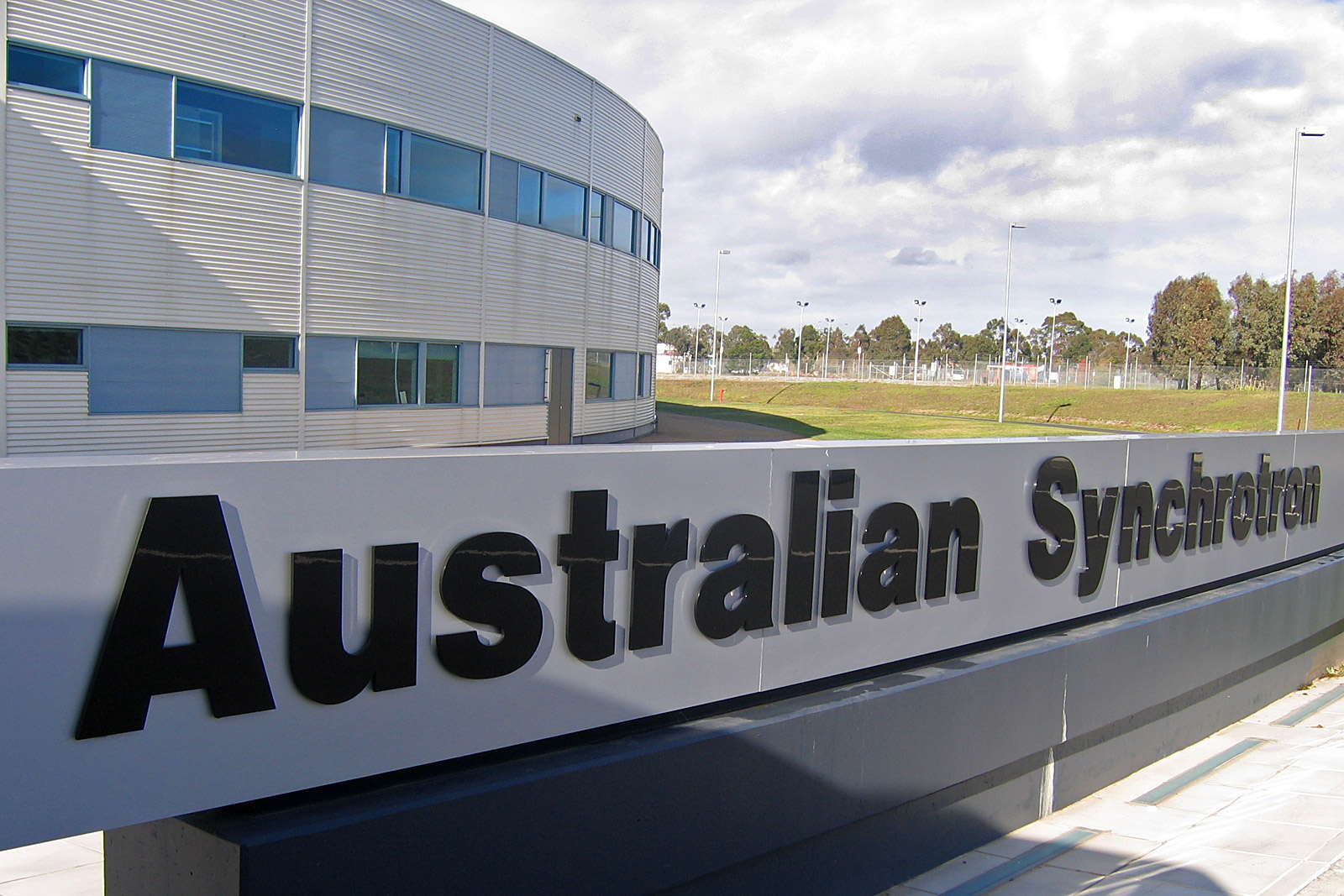
The Australian Synchrotron is located adjacent to university's Clayton Campus

The Clayton campus in Clayton covers approximately 110 hectares (270 acres) and is the largest of the Monash campuses. Clayton is the flagship campus for Monash, demanding higher ATAR scores than all of the other campuses, with the exception of Parkville. Clayton is home to the faculties of Arts, Business and Economics, Education, Engineering, Information Technology, Law, Medicine, Nursing and Health Sciences, and Science. The Clayton campus has its own suburb and postcode.

Various major scientific research facilities are located on or adjacent to the campus. Chief among these are the Australian Synchrotron and CSIRO.

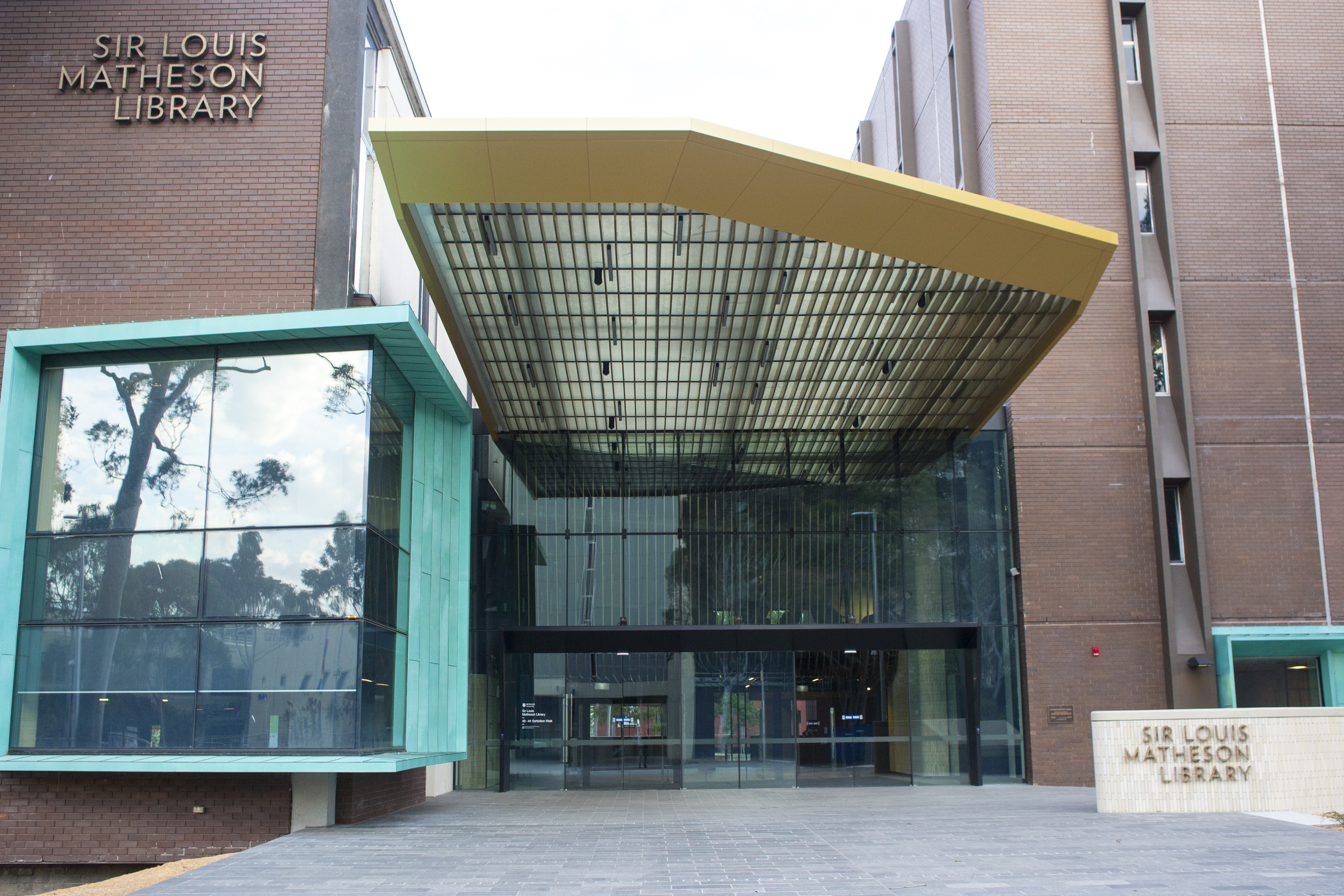
Sir Louis Matheson Library at the Clayton Campus

The campus is also home to numerous restaurants and retail outlets, as well as student bars: Sir John's (located in the Campus Centre) and the Notting Hill Hotel (located down the street, founded in 1891), both of which are hubs of social life on the campus.

The campus is also home to a number of halls of residence, colleges and other on-campus accommodations that house several thousand students. Six halls of residence are located at the Clayton campus. There is an additional private residential college affiliated with the university. The Clayton campus contains the Robert Blackwood Hall, named after the university's founding chancellor Sir Robert Blackwood and designed by Sir Roy Grounds.

==== Caulfield ====
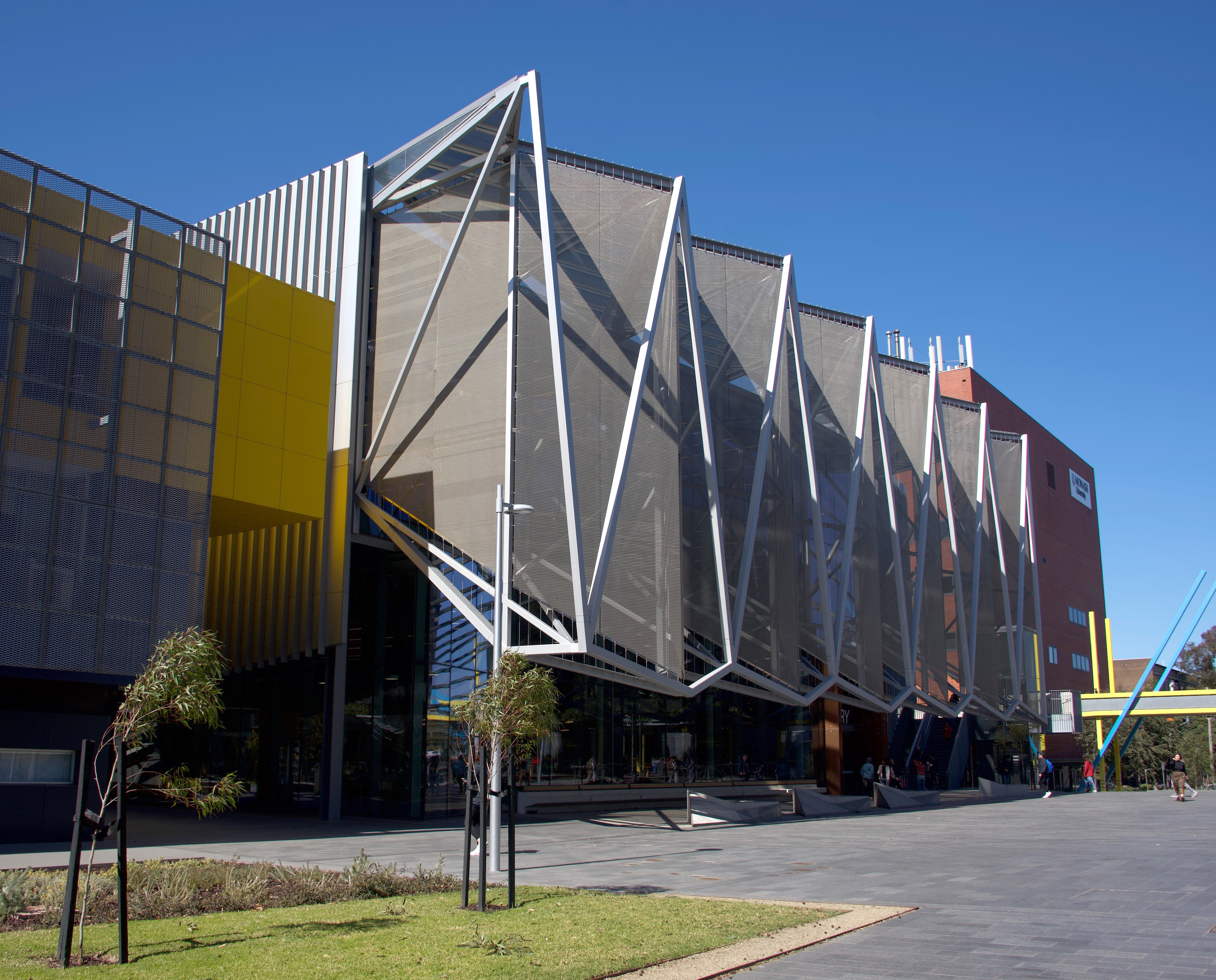
Caulfield Library at the Caulfield Campus

The Caulfield campus in Caulfield is Monash University's second-largest. Its multifaceted nature is reflected in the range of programs it offers through the faculties of Arts, Art Design & Architecture (MADA), Business & Economics, and Medicine, Nursing and Health Sciences. A major building program has been announced to expand teaching facilities, provide student accommodation, and redevelop the shopping centre.

==== Alfred ====
The Alfred campus is located in The Alfred Hospital and campus houses the Central Clinical School and the School of Public Health and Preventive Medicine, which contains the Department of Epidemiology and Preventive Medicine and the Department of Forensic Medicine.

==== Parkville ====
The Parkville campus is located on Royal Parade in Parkville, approximately 2 kilometres (1.2 mi) north of the Melbourne city centre. The campus is home to the Faculty of Pharmacy and Pharmaceutical Sciences. The faculty specialises in pharmacy practice, pharmaceutical and formulation science, and medicinal chemistry. The campus also offers postgraduate degrees, including the Doctor of Philosophy and Master of Clinical Pharmacy.

==== Peninsula ====
The Peninsula campus is located in the bayside suburb of Frankston on the edge of Melbourne. The campus has a teaching and research focus on health and wellbeing, and is a hub of undergraduate and postgraduate studies in Nursing, Health Science, Physiotherapy, Occupational Therapy and Psychology - and particularly in Emergency Health (Paramedic) courses. The Peninsula campus also offers a range of courses including those from its historic roots with early childhood and primary education (during the 1960s and 1970s, the campus was the State Teachers' College), and Business and Economics (since the merger of the State Teachers' College with the Caulfield Institute of Technology to create the Chisholm Institute of Technology in 1982). The campus was also home to the Peninsula School of Information Technology, which in 2006 was wound back with Information Technology units previously offered being relocated to the Caulfield campus.

==== City ====
The Monash Law city campus is located in the Melbourne city centre and houses the postgraduate Faculty of Law. It provides teaching for the Monash Law Masters and JD programmes. This campus is well placed within Melbourne's legal precinct, allowing students to have easy access to the surrounding courts.

===== Observatory =====
Monash University operates the Hutton-Westfold Observatory near Clayton Campus. The observatory has been in operation since 2009 and was named for Don Hutton and Kevin Westfold, both astronomers who worked at the university. The observatory is home to a Schmidt–Cassegrain telescope.

Online Campus

Monash University offers fully online postgraduate courses through Monash Online. Courses offered are in a range of disciplines including psychology, business, education and information technology.

This remote mode of learning offers students in regional and rural communities an accessible postgraduate education.

=== International ===
==== Malaysia ====
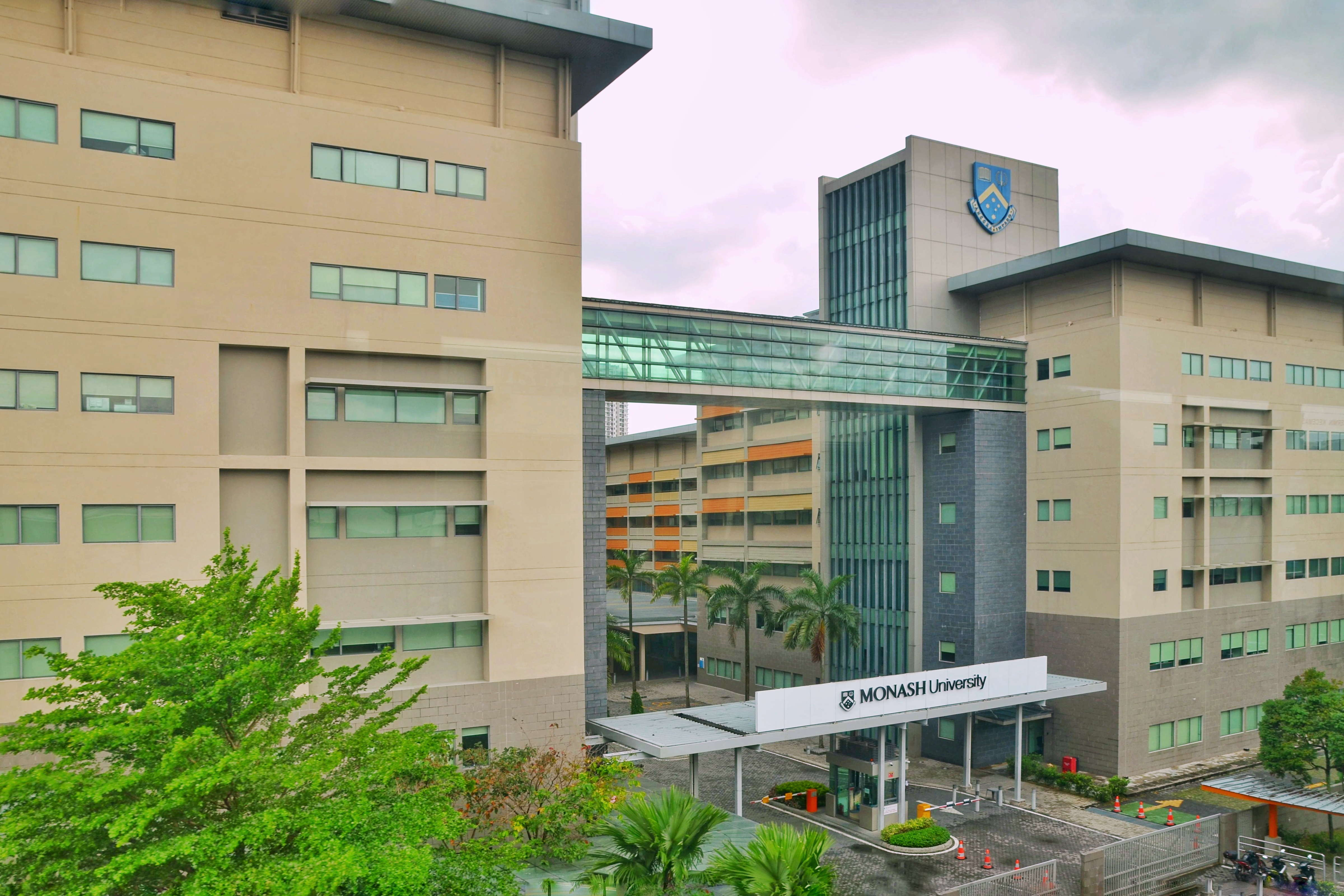
Monash University Malaysia campus

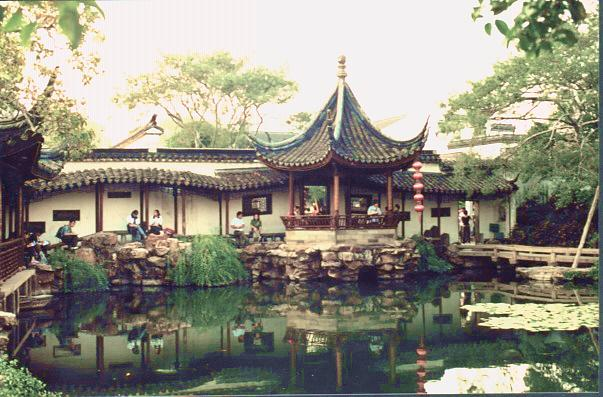
The city of Suzhou where Southeast-Monash Joint Graduate School located

The Monash University Malaysia campus opened in 1998 in Bandar Sunway, Selangor, Malaysia. The Sunway campus offers various undergraduate degrees through its faculties of Arts and Social Sciences, Business, Engineering, Information Technology, Medicine and Health Sciences, Pharmacy and Science. It is currently home to over 8,489 (2018) students. A purpose-built campus opened in 2007. Its degrees in Medicine and Surgery are the first medical degrees outside Australia and New Zealand accredited by the Australian Medical Council.

==== Italy ====
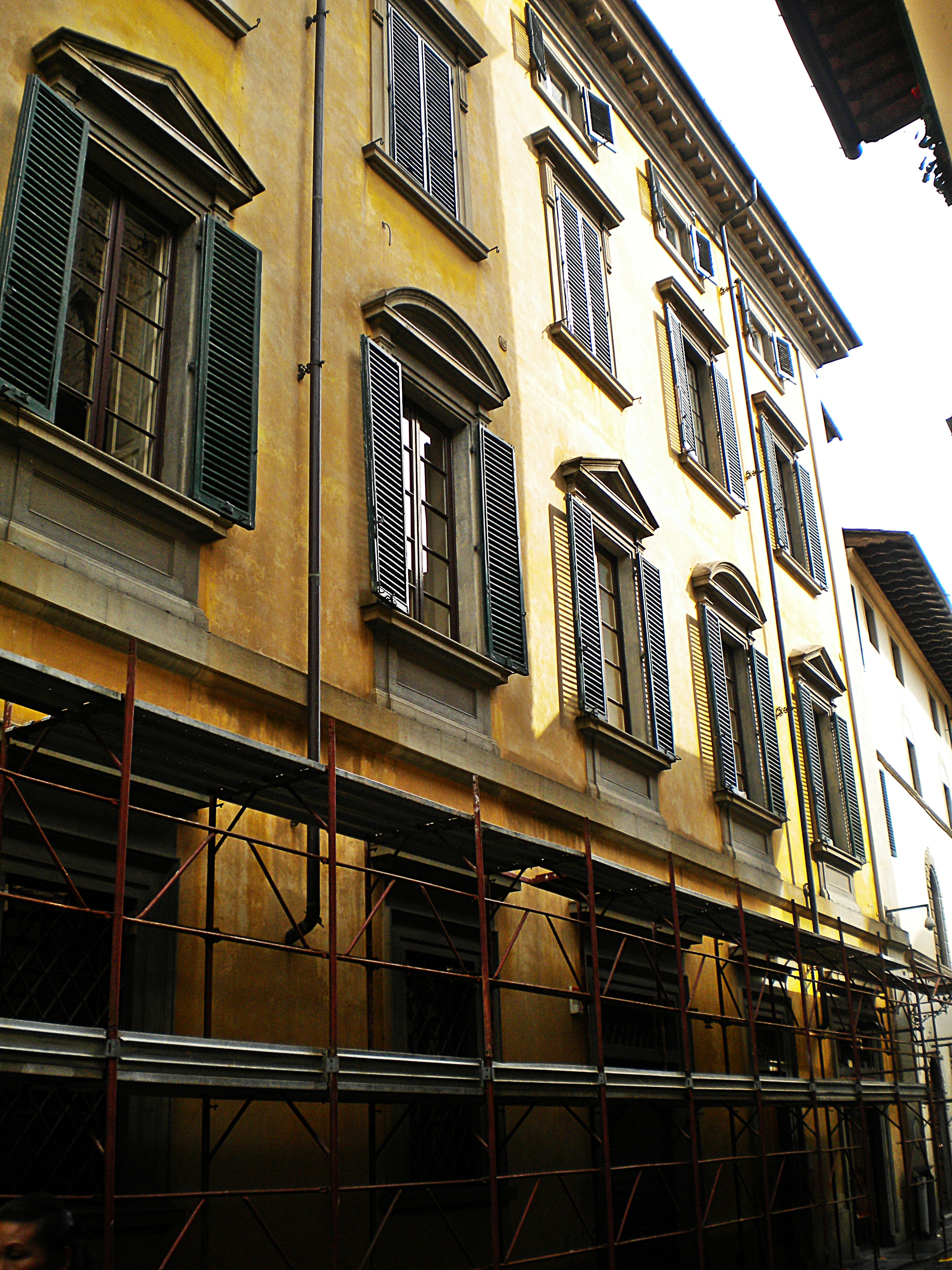
The Palazzo Vaj, where the Monash University Prato Centre is located

The Monash University Prato Centre is located in the 18th-century palace, Palazzo Vaj, in the historic centre of Prato, a city near Florence in Italy. Primarily, it hosts staff and students from Monash's other campuses for semesters in Law, Art Design & Architecture, History, Music, and Criminology as well as various international conferences. It was officially opened on 17 September 2001 as part of the university's vigorous internationalisation policy.

==== India ====
The IITB-Monash Research Academy opened in 2008 and is situated in Mumbai, India. It is a partnership between Monash and the Indian Institute of Technology Bombay. It aims to carry out high impact research in engineering and sciences, particularly clean energy, biotechnology and nanotechnology. Students undertake their research in both India and Australia, with supervisors from both Monash and IITB. Upon graduating, they receive a dual PhD from the two institutions. In the month following its official opening, 36 joint projects had commenced, with a further several hundred planned.

In August 2015, Christopher Pyne, Australian Minister for Education and Training, officially opened the new Monash-IITB Research Academy Building in Mumbai, India.

==== Suzhou, China ====
In 2012, it was announced that Monash had won a licence to develop a joint graduate school with Southeast University (Nanjing) in Suzhou, Jiangsu Province. The Southeast University-Monash University Joint Graduate School is the first Australian university, and the third foreign university, to win a licence to operate in China. The school offers master's degrees and PhDs in science and engineering, with an initial cohort of 500 students, building up to 2000 in the years to come.

==== Indonesia ====
The Monash University, Indonesia, opened its doors in October 2021, focusing on postgraduate programs offering master's degree and PhDs. Currently the campus offers several master's degree programs including: Data Science, Cybersecurity, Urban Design, Business Innovation, Public Policy & Management, Marketing & Digital Communications, Public Health, and Sustainability. The campus is located in BSD City, Tangerang, Banten.

The campus plans to expand to undergraduate courses from July 2026, with bachelor's degrees in design, digital business, and information technology.

=== Former campuses ===
==== Gippsland ====
In 1990, Gippsland College of Higher Education merged with Monash University and was renamed Monash University Gippsland College on July 1, 1990.

The Gippsland campus provided courses via distance education. However, between 2005 and 2010, many of these programs were transferred to city campuses, thus losing their appeal to regional areas. At its peak enrolment in 2007, the campus was home to 2,000 on-campus students, 5,000 off-campus students and nearly 400 staff. The campus was located in the Latrobe Valley town of Churchill. Until 2014, it was the only non-metropolitan campus of Monash University.

The Gippsland campus had on-campus accommodation including the self-catering West House and East House.

Ballarat University joined with Monash University's Gippsland campus to form a new regional university known as Federation University Australia from 1 January 2014, so this campus is no longer part of Monash.

==== Berwick ====
The former Berwick campus of Monash University was built on the old Casey airfield in the south-eastern growth corridor of Victoria, Australia. With a presence in the area since 1994, the first Monash Berwick campus building was completed in 1996 and the third building in March 2004. It was situated on a 55-hectare site in the City of Casey, then one of the three fastest growing municipalities in Australia. Monash announced the closure of this campus to staff and students on 7 March 2016. On 15 July 2016 it was announced that Federation University Australia would take responsibility for the Berwick Campus from 2017 pending government approvals. This officially commenced on 1 January 2018, as a campus of Federation University Australia.

==== South Africa ====
In August 2013, Monash University entered a partnership with Laureate International Universities to establish a campus in South Africa. This effort was short-lived, and Monash elected to transfer ownership of the campus to the Independent Institute of Education (IIE) South Africa in 2015. The transfer was concluded in 2019.

== Governance and structure ==
=== Chancellor and Vice-Chancellor ===
The vice-chancellor is the chief executive of the university, who is head of Monash's day-to-day activities. The vice-chancellor is also the university president of Monash. (In North America and parts of Europe, the equivalent role is the president or principal.) The chancellor is chair of the university council and provides advice to the vice-chancellor, as well as having ceremonial duties. Council is the governing body of the university, established by the Monash University Act 2009.

Margaret Gardner was named as the vice-chancellor and president on 1 September 2014, the first woman to hold the position. After Gardner was appointed Governor of Victoria in 2023, Susan Elliott AM took over as interim VC, until the appointment of Sharon Pickering in February 2024, as 10th vice-chancellor and president of the university.

Megan Clark AC was appointed chancellor in 2024. Deputy Chancellors are Geraldine Johns-Putra, Peter Young AM KC, and John Simpson AM.

=== Faculties and departments ===
Monash is divided into 10 faculties. These incorporate the university's major departments of teaching and research centres.

The faculties are:

- Faculty of Art, Design & Architecture (MADA)
- Faculty of Arts
- Faculty of Business and Economics
- Faculty of Education
- Faculty of Engineering
- Faculty of Information Technology
- Faculty of Law
- Faculty of Medicine, Nursing and Health Sciences
- Faculty of Pharmacy and Pharmaceutical Sciences
- Faculty of Science

Various other academic organisations exist alongside the faculties and research centres.

== Academic profile ==
=== Research and publications ===
Monash University staff produce over 3,000 research publications each year, with research conducted in over 150 fields of study.

=== Research divisions ===
Monash is home to over 120 research centres and institutes. Major interdisciplinary research centres include the Monash Biomedicine Discovery Institute, the Monash University Accident Research Centre, and the Monash Centre for Synchrotron Science. Some notable research centres also located at or affiliated with Monash University include the Australian Regenerative Medicine Institute, the Castan Centre for Human Rights Law, the Melbourne Centre for Nanofabrication, and the Monash Institute of Medical Research.

Some of the university's notable research achievements include the world's first IVF pregnancy, the first seatbelt legislation, the discovery of the anti-influenza drug Relenza (Zanamivir), the discovery that nerve stem cells could be derived from embryonic stem cells, and the development of a single-use oral anti-malaria drug.

==== Monash Sustainable Development Institute ====
The Monash Sustainable Development Institute (MSDI) was an interdisciplinary research institute with a focus on sustainable development, that included researchers from all 10 faculties of the university. In 2026, the institute was shut down, with its programs and operations moving, for the most part, into individual faculties or portfolios. As of 2024 it comprised more than 150 staff and PhD students. MSDI worked with industry and government, civil society, and other academics, and used the United Nations Sustainable Development Goals (SDGs) as a framework to guide its work. MSDI included four centres focusing on specific capabilities:

- Working with Water, now a collaboration between Water Sensitive Cities Australia and RISE, is focused on solving issues relating to water use in urban environments, and access to safe water for all. It has transitioned into the Faculty of Art, Design and Architecture at the Caulfield Campus.
- The Climateworks Centre, until March 2022 branded ClimateWorks Australia, operates as an independent not-for-profit within Monash, and focuses on climate transition in Australia, Southeast Asia, and the Pacific region. Its goal is to "bridge the gap between research and climate action". It is headed by CEO Anna Skarbek, who was appointed executive director at its inception. The centre won a Eureka Prize, worth A$10,000, for its first project in 2010. The project was a "low-carbon growth plan to measure the costs and benefits for business". The centre is not aligned to a faculty and will be administered by the Deputy Vice-Chancellor (Research and Enterprise).
- BehaviourWorks Australia focuses on research that produces knowledge on how to facilitate change to address the SDGs. It conducts applied research into behaviour change. It has transitioned into the Faculty of Business and Economics.
- The Food-Energy-Water Nexus was a collaboration between MSDI, Monash Food Innovation, and the Monash Energy Institute that supports interdisciplinary research in the areas of food production, energy, and water systems, looking to improve the sustainability of all three. There is no known information of the outcome of the closure of the institute on this project.

==== Monash International Affairs Society ====
The Monash International Affairs Society (MIAS) is an international affairs research group established in 2011. It hosted diplomatic events with ambassadors of countries such as Russia and Singapore, and publishes a journal PIVOT, which covers political issues.

=== Libraries and collections ===
Monash University Library operates several libraries at all of its campuses, spanning three continents.

=== Museums and archives ===
==== Monash University Museum of Art ====
The Monash University Museum of Art (MUMA), since 2010 based on the Caulfield Campus, is the result of an initiative started in 1961, when the inaugural Vice Chancellor Louis Matheson created a fund for the purchase of artworks by then living Australian artists. The establishment of the museum reflected a desire by the university's founders to create the modern Australian university, and to enrich the cultural life of students, staff and visitors.

In 1975, the Monash University Gallery was created in the Menzies Building, moving in 1987 to the Multi-Discipline Centre (later called the Gallery Building).

Its collection had grown to over 1500 works by 2008, including artworks by Arthur Boyd, William Dobell, Sidney Nolan, Howard Arkley, Tracey Moffatt, John Perceval, Fred Williams and Bill Henson. While the gallery's focus is on contemporary Australian art, it houses a number of international works and exhibitions. It hosts regular exhibitions which are open to Monash students and staff, as well as the general public.

As of January 2022 the curator is Charlotte Day, while the advisory committee is chaired by Dean Shane Murray and includes Louise Adler and Maudie Palmer AO, founding director of the TarraWarra Museum of Art and Heide Museum of Modern Art.

=== Galleries and exhibitions ===
==== MADA Gallery ====
Known as the Faculty Gallery between 1999 and 2012, the MADA Gallery is a contemporary art gallery located at the university's Caulfield Campus. It is used for teaching and exhibitions. The gallery exhibits solo and group shows by academic and professional staff, local, interstate and international artists and curators, and also hosts artist in residency programs.

=== Tuition, loans and financial aid ===
For international students starting in 2025, tuition fees range from A$37,100 to A$92,900 per academic year for award programs lasting at least one year. Domestic students (Note: According to the Higher Education Support Act 2003, domestic students include permanent residents and New Zealand citizens in addition to Australian citizens.) may be offered a federally-subsidised Commonwealth Supported Place (CSP) which substantially decreases the student contribution amount billed to the student. The maximum student contribution amount limits that can be applied to CSP students are dependent on the field of study.

The university also offers several scholarships, which come in the form of bursaries or tuition fee remission.

=== Academic reputation ===
University rankings

Global – Overall
- ARWU World: 76 (2025)
- CWTS World: 51 (Note: The CWTS Leiden Ranking is based on P (top 10%).) (2024)
- QS World: =36 (2026)
- QS Employability: 54 (2022)
- THE World: =58 (2026)
- THE Reputation: 63 (2025)
- USNWR Global: 38 (25/26)

National – Overall
- ARWU National: 4 (2025)
- CWTS National: 4 (2024)
- ERA National: 4 (2018)
- QS National: 5 (2026)
- THE National: 3 (2026)
- USNWR National: 4 (25/26)
- AFR National: 4 (2025)

In the 2024 Aggregate Ranking of Top Universities, which measures aggregate performance across the QS, THE and ARWU rankings, the university attained a position of #50 (3rd nationally).

National publications

In the Australian Financial Review Best Universities Ranking 2025, the university was ranked #4 amongst Australian universities.

Global publications

In the 2026 Quacquarelli Symonds World University Rankings (published 2025), the university attained a tied position of #36 (5th nationally).

In the Times Higher Education World University Rankings 2026 (published 2025), the university attained a tied position of #58 (3rd nationally).

In the 2025 Academic Ranking of World Universities, the university attained a position of #76 (4th nationally).

In the 2025–2026 U.S. News & World Report Best Global Universities, the university attained a position of #38 (4th nationally).

In the CWTS Leiden Ranking 2024, the university attained a position of #51 (4th nationally).

=== Student outcomes ===
The Australian Government's QILT (Note: Abbreviation for Quality Indicators for Learning and Teaching.) conducts national surveys documenting the student life cycle from enrolment through to employment. These surveys place more emphasis on criteria such as student experience, graduate outcomes and employer satisfaction than perceived reputation, research output and citation counts.

In the 2023 Employer Satisfaction Survey, graduates of the university had an overall employer satisfaction rate of 83.9%.

In the 2023 Graduate Outcomes Survey, graduates of the university had a full-time employment rate of 82% for undergraduates and 87.8% for postgraduates. The initial full-time salary was A$73,000 for undergraduates and A$91,000 for postgraduates.

In the 2023 Student Experience Survey, undergraduates at the university rated the quality of their entire educational experience at 73.1% meanwhile postgraduates rated their overall education experience at 75.6%.

=== Monash College ===
Monash College provides students with an alternative point of entry to Monash University. The institution offers pathway studies for students who endeavour to undertake studies at one of the Monash campuses. The college's specialised undergraduate diplomas provide an alternative entry point into more than 60 Monash University bachelor degrees, taught intensively in smaller classes and an environment overall similar to that offered by the university. The college offers programs in several countries throughout the world.

== Student life ==
=== Student union ===
Monash students are represented by student unions in individual campus organisations. Graduate students are represented by the university-wide Monash Graduate Association, while undergraduate students are represented by:

- Monash Student Association (MSA) – Clayton Campus
- Monash Student Union Caulfield (MONSU Caulfield) – Caulfield Campus
- Monash Parkville Student Union (MPSU) – Parkville Campus
- Monash Student Union Peninsula (MONSU Peninsula) – Peninsula Campus
- Monash University Student Association (MUSA) – Malaysia campus

Monash students are also represented by academic associations and societies. These groups organise social events and represent student interests to the faculty among other goals.

Apart from the representative organisations, Monash has numerous other interest-based clubs and societies. Some notable student organisations include:

- International Affairs Society, Monash
- Monash Association of Debaters
- Monash Whites Football Club

=== Student media ===
Esperanto is the student magazine of Monash's Caulfield campus. It is produced by students, for students and operates as part of MONSU Caulfield. Esperanto is one of the two print magazines at the campuses of Monash University, the other is Lots Wife. Esperanto is the current incarnation of a student magazine that has been based on Caulfield campus since 1970, when it was known as Caulfield Institute of Technology. Over time, it has been variously called Cautisone, The Naked Wasp and Otico. The current name was settled upon when the 2003 editor of Otico trademarked the name and logo.

The magazine is named after Esperanto the universal language constructed by L.L. Zamenhof.

=== Sports and athletics ===
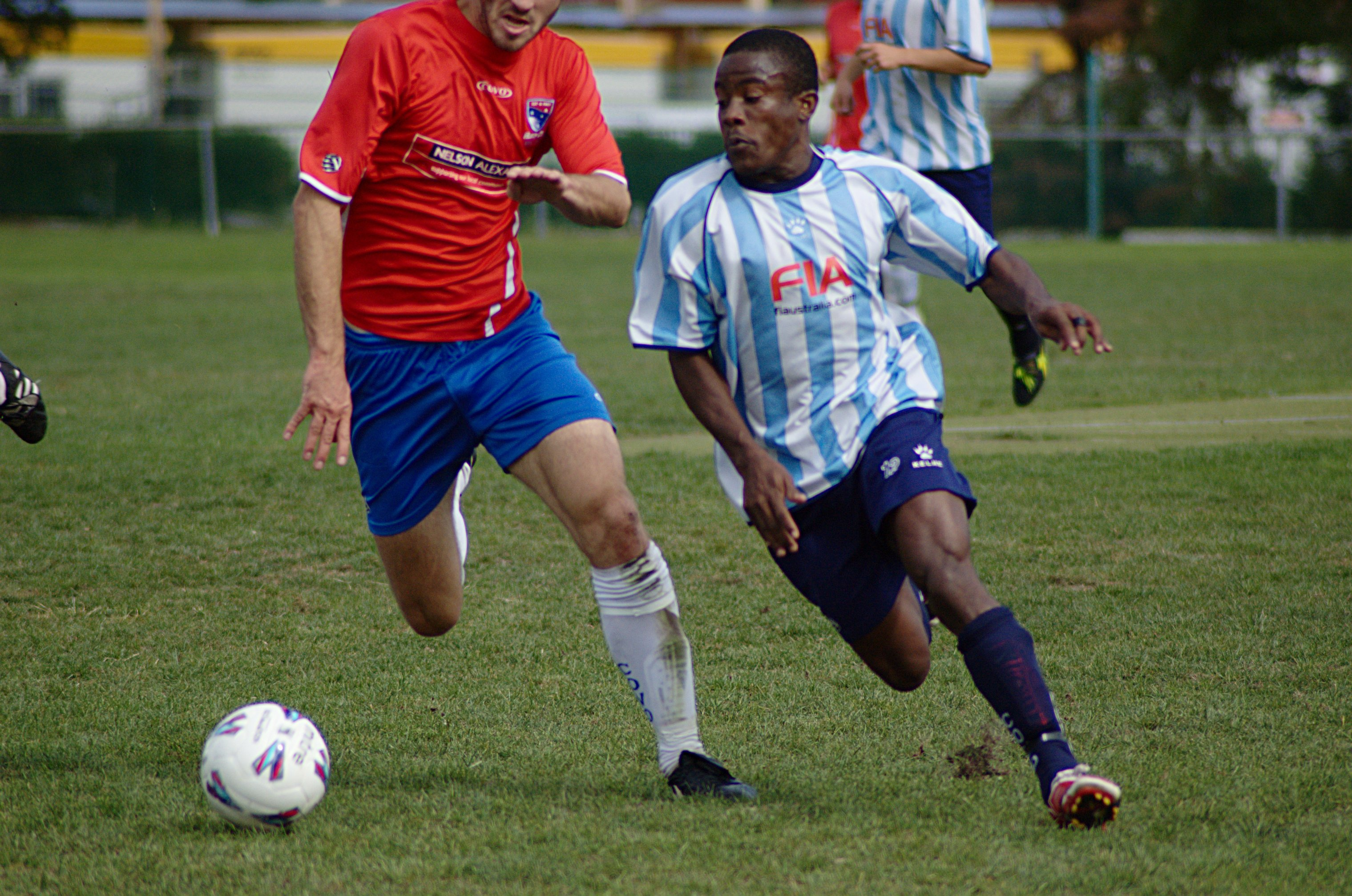
Monash University Soccer

Sport at Monash University is overseen by Monash Sport, a department of the university which employs over 200 staff. Currently, there are over 50 sporting clubs at the university. The Monash Blues, which competes in the Victorian Amateur Football Association (VAFA), plays its home games at Frearson Oval at the Clayton campus.

Each campus has a range of sporting facilities used by students and staff, including football, cricket, hockey, soccer, rugby and baseball fields; tennis, squash and badminton courts; gyms and swimming pools. The university also had an alpine lodge at Mount Buller until the end of 2011.

Monash's sporting teams compete in a range of local and national competitions, with the largest number of students of any Australian university playing in to the Australian University Games. The school won the AUG in 2008 and 2009.

Facilities at Monash are often used by a range of professional sporting teams. For example, the Australia national association football team, the Socceroos, used the Clayton campus and trained on-site in South Africa for the 2010 FIFA World Cup.

== Halls and colleges ==
=== Residential halls ===
Monash Residential Services (MRS) is responsible for co-ordinating the operation of on-campus halls of residence. MRS manages a variety of facilities on campus at Clayton and Peninsula:

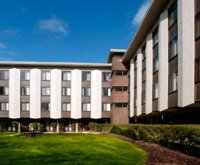
Deakin Hall, Old Deakin

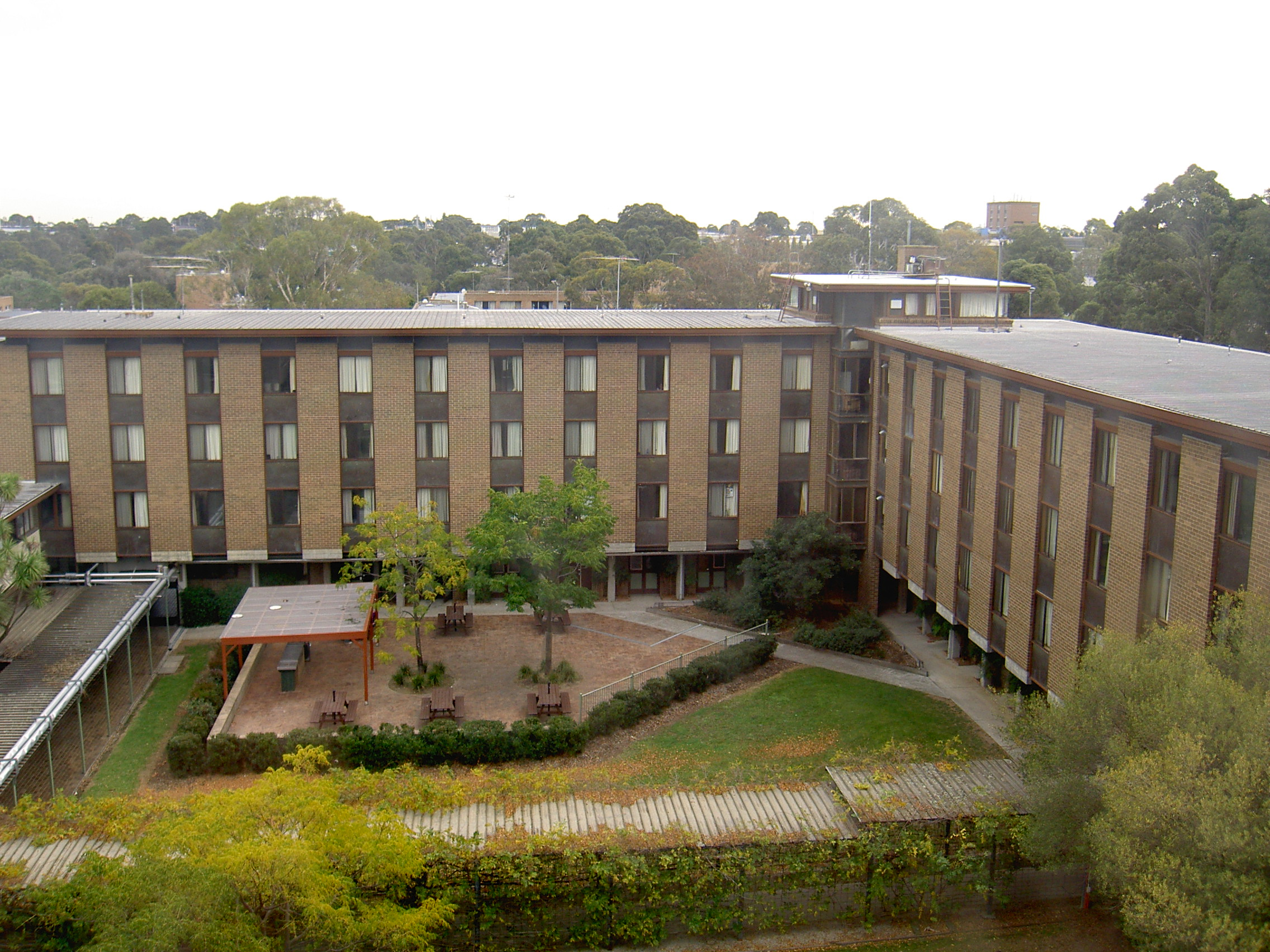
Farrer Hall

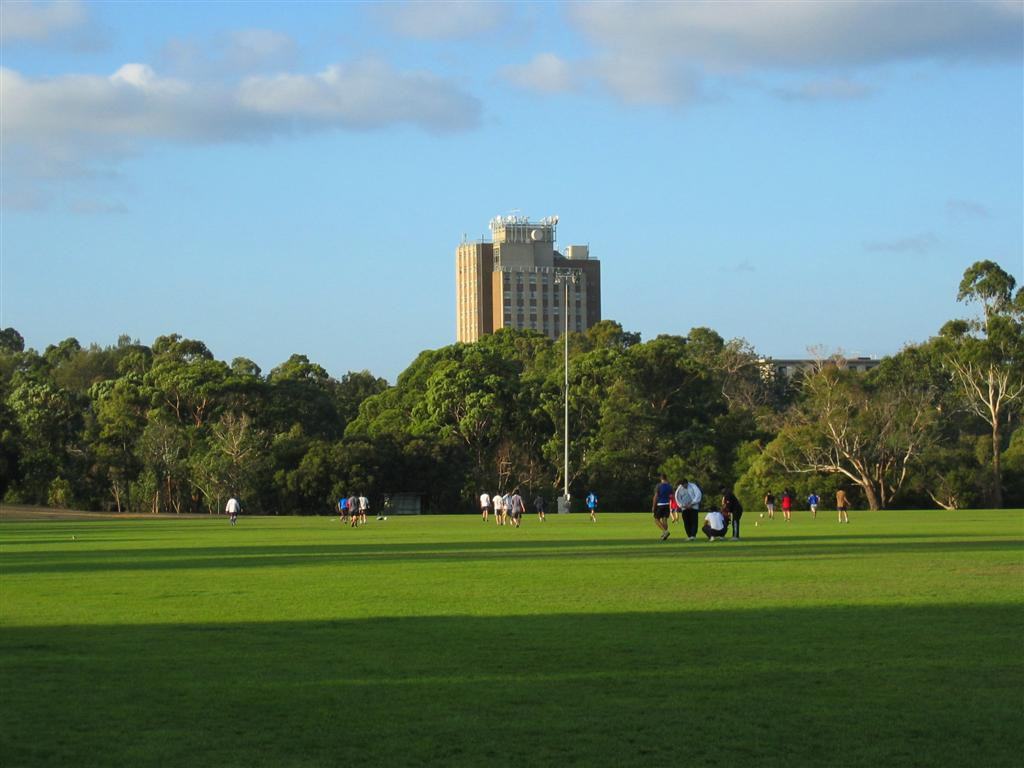
Howitt Hall

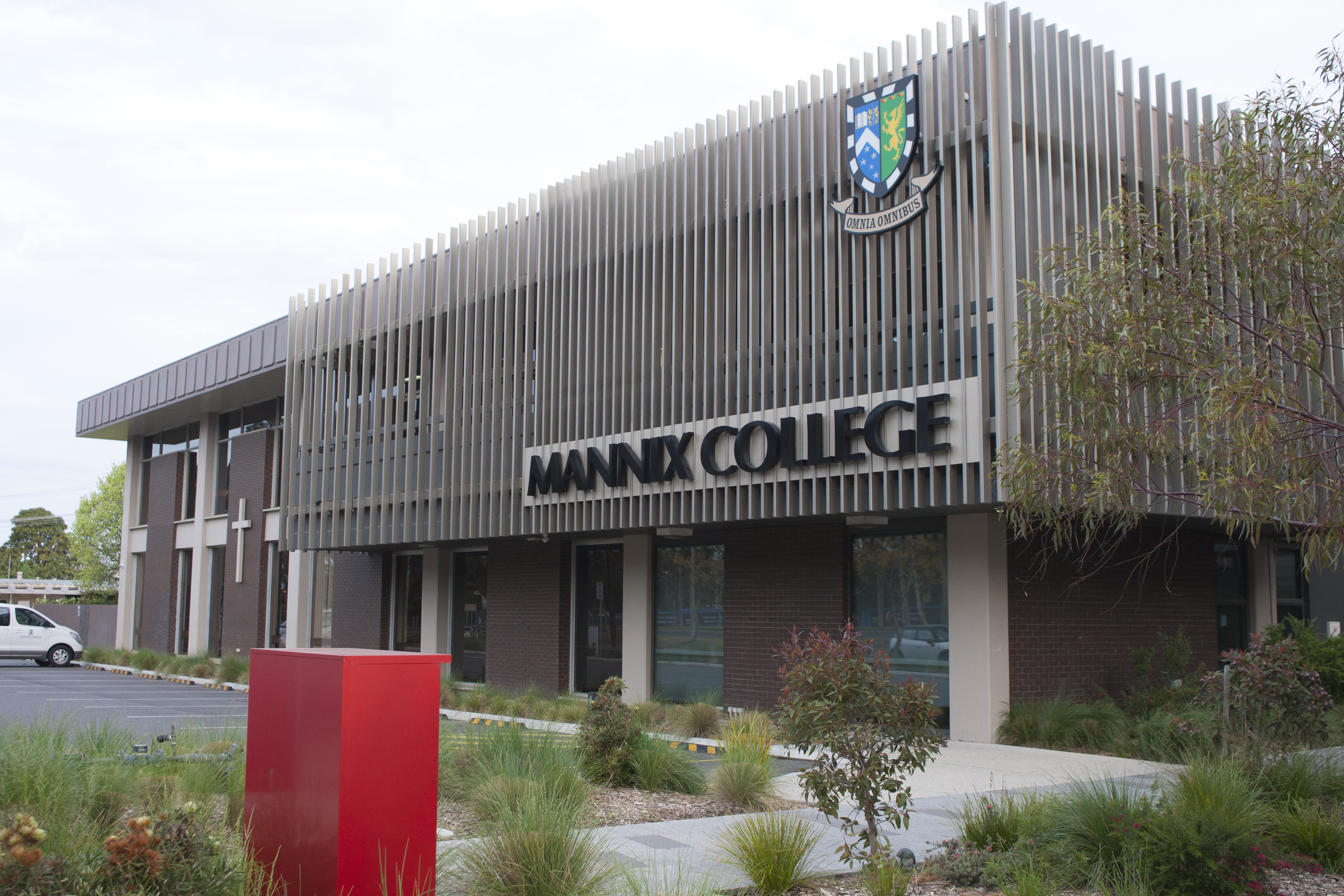
Mannix College

List of colleges
College	Year of foundation
Deakin Hall (Clayton)	1962
Farrer Hall (Clayton)	1965
Howitt Hall (Clayton)	1966
Mannix Hall (Clayton)	1969
Roberts Hall (Clayton)	1971
Richardson Hall (Clayton)	1972
South East Flats (Clayton)	1972
Marist College (Notting Hill)	1969-1978
Normanby House (Notting Hill, on Marist College site)	1978-2024
Jackomos Hall (Clayton)	2012
Briggs Hall (Clayton)	2012
Turner Hall (Clayton)	2015
Campbell Hall (Clayton)	2016
Holman Hall (Clayton)	2016
Logan Hall (Clayton)	2016
Peninsula Residential
Gillies Hall (Peninsula)	2019

==== Mannix College ====
Mannix College, founded in 1969 and owned by the Catholic Church, was originally an all-male college administered by the Dominican order. It is named after Daniel Mannix (1864–1963), who was the Catholic Archbishop of Melbourne. Mannix is affiliated with the university, and located opposite the southern end of the Clayton campus.

The Newman Lecture series is an annual public lecture series held at Mannix College. It is named after Cardinal John Henry Newman and began in 1981. (Note: Not to be confused with the Archbishop Daniel Mannix Memorial Lecture, held at Newman College at the University of Melbourne.) The inaugural lecture was given by Bishop Eric D'Arcy, and others by Sir Edward Dunlop, Robyn Williams, Michael Tate, Max Charlesworth, and Veronica Brady. In both 2006 and 2007, the lecture was presented as a play, both relating to the life of Daniel Mannix. The 2009 lecture, delivered by Gabrielle McMullen, celebrated 40 years of Mannix College.

==== Normanby House ====
Marist College, founded by the Marist order, was established in November 1969 as a traditional all-male college, with an attached seminary. Marist College had closed by 1978, the university subsequently purchasing the college and naming it Normanby House. Normanby House had closed its doors (demolished) by early 2025 to "make way" for the Suburban Rail Loop project.

==== Non-residential colleges ====
In 2013, Monash University introduced non-residential colleges (renamed Monash Student Communities in 2025). These communities (originally colleges) act as organised social groups for non-residential students, seeking to replicate the social experiences that residential students receive. There are now eight colleges: Orion, Centaurus and Ursa (Clayton campus); Pegasus, Phoenix and Auriga (Caulfield campus); Aquila (Peninsula campus); and Lupa (Parkville campus).

== Notable people ==
=== Notable alumni ===
There are 1,100 Monash graduates (or 8.33% of the total biographical listings) listed among the 13,200 biographies of Australia's most notable individuals in the 2008 edition of Who's Who in Australia. Likewise, 10% of Australia's top 50 CEOs completed their undergraduate degree at Monash.

Notable graduates in politics include: Bill Shorten, former Australian Leader of the Opposition; Daniel Andrews, former Premier of Victoria; Richard Di Natale, Former Leader of the Australian Greens; Josh Frydenberg, former Treasurer of Australia; Boediono , Ministry of Finance, Indonesian Republic and Vice President, Adam Bandt, Former Leader of the Australian Greens; Anna Burke, former Speaker of the Australian House of Representatives; Boediono, former Australian Leader of the Opposition; Simon Crean, former cabinet member in the Rudd government and Gillard government; David de Kretser, former Governor of Victoria; Lim Guan Eng, former Minister of Finance of Malaysia; Sim Kui Hian, Deputy Premier of Sarawak; Norman Lacy, former Minister for the Arts and Minister of Educational Services in Victoria; Robert Doyle, former Lord Mayor of Melbourne; Marlene Moses, United Nations Ambassador for Nauru and the Tanzanian ambassador Naimi Sweetie Hamza Aziz.

Graduates in scientific fields include: Alan Finkel, Chief Scientist of Australia; Ian Meredith, Global Chief Medical Officer and Executive Vice President, Boston Scientific; Tim Flannery, scientist, ecology activist; Brad McKay, doctor, author and television personality; and Ranjana Srivastava, oncologist and author.

Graduates in entertainment include: Doug Chappel, comedian and actor; David Williamson, playwright; Andrew Daddo, actor, author, and television personality; Charlie Pickering, TV host and comedian; Vance Joy, singer-songwriter.

Graduates in other fields include: Peter Costello, businessman, political commentator and longest-serving Treasurer of Australia; Ian MacFarlane, economist, Governor of the Reserve Bank of Australia (1996–2006); George Pell, Australian Cardinal of the Catholic Church; Anne Ferguson, Chief Justice of Victoria; Marilyn Warren, 11th and first female Chief Justice of Victoria; Jannie Chan entrepreneur and business executive; and glass artist Clare Belfrage.

=== Academics and staff ===
Notable academics and staff at Monash have included:

- Waleed Aly, TV presenter, lawyer, journalist
- Jessica Borger, T-cell immunologist
- Kate Burridge, linguist
- Ken Coghill, former Speaker of the Parliament of Victoria
- Michael Cowley, physiologist
- Ross Day, Foundation Chair of the Department of Psychology
- Raymond Finkelstein, former Justice of the Federal Court of Australia
- George Hampel, former Justice of the Supreme Court of Victoria
- Brian McFarlane, film historian and writer
- Constant Mews, authority on early Medieval thought
- Yew-Kwang Ng, economist
- Ann Nicholson, computer scientist
- Graham Oppy, philosopher
- Graeme Pearman, climate change scientist
- Burkard Polster, mathematician and mathematics communicator
- Andrew Prentice, mathematician
- Kathy Temin, artist
- John Thwaites, environmentalist, former Deputy Premier of Victoria
- Christopher Weeramantry, judge and former vice-president of the International Court of Justice
- Jean Whyte, foundation professor of the Graduate School of Librarianship

== See also ==
- List of universities in Australia
- John Monash Science School
- Monash University Regiment
