= Australian Stem Cell Centre =

Australian research institute

- Founder: Alan Trounson (Founding Director)
- Established: 2003
- Mission: Medical research
- Faculty: University of Adelaide; Monash University; University of New South Wales; University of Queensland; Howard Florey Institute; Peter MacCallum Cancer Institute; Victor Chang Cardiac Research Institute
- Location: Monash Science Technology Research and Innovation Precinct, Clayton, Melbourne, Victoria, Australia
- Coordinates: 37°54′37″S 145°07′45″E
- Interactive map of Australian Stem Cell Centre
- Website: www.stemcellcentre.edu.au

The Australian Stem Cell Centre is an Australian medical research and development centre which focuses on regenerative medicine through the use of stem cells. Founded in 2003, the Centre is the National Biotechnology Centre of Excellence and has received over $100 million in funding in recent years. It is Australia's premier stem cell research organisation.

In June 2008, the Centre announced that it had begun working on induced pluripotent (iPS) cells (human embryonic stem cells, artificially created without human eggs or embryos). This was the first time in Australia that such research had been carried out, and the first time that scientists had worked on this type of stem cell outside the US or Japan.

It is based at Monash Science Technology Research and Innovation Precinct and was founded by nine leading Australian universities and medical research institutes.

One of the founders of the Centre is Dr Alan Trounson, a Monash scientist who was part of the team that delivered Australia's first IVF baby in 1980. Trounson has also made several ground-breaking discoveries in stem cell research. In 2000, Trounson led the team of scientists which first reported nerve stem cells derived from embryonic stem cells, which led to a dramatic increase in interest in the potential of stem cell research.

== See also ==
- Australian Regenerative Medicine Institute
- Health in Australia
