= Robert Blackwood (engineer) =

Australian academic (1906–1982)

Sir Robert Rutherford Blackwood (3 June 1906 – 21 August 1982) was an Australian engineer, prominent businessman and university administrator. He was the first chancellor of Monash University, serving from 1961 to 1968, and chairman of Dunlop Australia from 1972 to 1979.

== Early life ==
Blackwood was born on 3 June 1906 in South Yarra, Melbourne, the eldest of three children. His father, Robert Leslie Blackwood, was a schoolteacher and tutor in classics. His younger sister was Dame Margaret Blackwood, a botanist who later became Dean of Botany at Melbourne University.

Blackwood was educated at Melbourne Church of England Grammar School and the University of Melbourne. He graduated from Melbourne University in the early 1930s with a Bachelor of Electrical Engineering, as well as a Bachelor and Master of Civil Engineering and was Knighted by the then British Governor General of Australia.

== Professional career ==
Blackwood's career began at Melbourne University, researching and lecturing in engineering. His early research focused on the strength of electrical arc welds, using statistics in a manner which was new to the field.

In 1933, one year after his marriage to Hazel Levenia McLeod, Blackwood joined Dunlop Rubber, a company he would work with extensively for decades. Beginning as a research engineer, he was promoted to technical manager in 1937. He left the company to become Foundation Chair of Mechanical Engineering at Melbourne University, before returning to Dunlop in 1948 to be its general manager.

When Monash University was established by an Act of Parliament in 1958, Blackwood was appointed chairman of its Interim Council. When the university took on its first students in 1961, he was its first chancellor. He pushed for Monash to become a generalist, multi-disciplinary university, which was unusual at the time. The university was initially intended to focus on applied sciences and technology, to compensate for overcrowding in these fields at Melbourne University, but by its opening it established faculties across the full spectrum of academic and professional studies.

He was knighted in the Queen's Birthday Honours of 1961, in recognition of his service to Monash University.

The impact of Sir Robert Blackwood on Monash University is still evident today. Not only is the Clayton Campus' great hall named after him, but its design continues to reflect his insistence, as an engineer, on certain design features in its original master plan. Most buildings are situated inside a ring-road, with the medicine, science and engineering buildings in contiguous positions, and the older buildings are connected by a series of service tunnels.

Blackwood later returned to Pacific Dunlop as managing director and then as chairman of what was one of the largest Australian companies of its time.

== Personal life ==
Blackwood was described by friends and colleagues as scrupulous and enthusiastic, though not prone to express his emotions. He had a range of interests outside of his working life, including painting, carpentry and archaeology. He published two books on South-East Asia, and served in public affairs in a range of capacities, including as trustee of the Museum of Victoria and president of the Royal Society of Victoria.

Sir Robert Blackwood died in Brighton, Victoria on 21 August 1982, aged 76. He was survived by his wife Hazel, their son Andrew, daughter Janet and grandchildren Nikki, Robert, Julian and Alistair.
