= Monash University, Peninsula campus =

Campus of Monash University at Frankston, Victoria, Australia

Coordinates: 38.152°S 145.136°E

The Peninsula campus of Monash University is Monash's third-largest campus, with close to 4000 students and almost 300 staff. The campus is located at the "Gateway to the Mornington Peninsula", in the Bayside suburb of Frankston. It continues to specialise in its historical strengths of health and early childhood education. Monash teaching in primary education, nursing and physiotherapy are all based at Peninsula Campus. The campus offers programs from undergraduate through to PhD level. It has research strengths in health and well-being, education and business. At any one time, there are around 100 higher degree by research students at Peninsula Campus.

== History ==
The Peninsula Campus of Monash University was originally a teacher's college, Frankston Teachers' College, later known as State College of Victoria Frankston, with teachers graduating there from 1960 until 1981. State College of Victoria (SCV) was established in 1973, and was the co-ordinating body for teacher education in Victoria. The first teacher training colleges were established in the 1920s at Ballarat, Bendigo, and Melbourne. More colleges opened in the 1950s and 60s, in Geelong, Toorak, Burwood, Coburg, and Frankston. (Around 1981 SCV was abolished, and its functions transferred to Victorian Post-Secondary Education Commission (VPSEC), along with those of the Victoria Institute of Colleges.)

During this time, it educated many teachers who went on to become quite well known in children's education, such as author Paul Jennings.

In 1982, the college merged with the Caulfield Institute of Technology to form the Chisholm Institute of Technology. By the end of the decade, federal government reforms to higher education in Australia made it clear that smaller degree-providing institutions would have to merge with larger ones. As a result, both Caulfield and Peninsula Chisholm campuses merged with Monash University in 1990, as part of the University's massive expansion. During the 1990s, Monash Vice-Chancellor Mal Logan was able to secure tens of millions of dollars' worth of government grants to undertake an expansion and redevelopment of the Peninsula Campus.

== Facilities ==
Major facilities at Peninsula campus complement its teaching and research strengths. In addition to theatres, cafes, restaurants and a major library, the campus is home to the Peninsula Hockey Centre and the Peninsula Education Precinct. Further, Monash and all levels of Australian government are currently in the final stages of planning the $30 million Frankston Regional Aquatic, Health and Wellness Centre, to be located in the north-west corner of the campus.

Monash University is investing $50 million in upgrading the Peninsula campus facilities.

- $30 million for a six-storey 150 bedroom new student accommodation building to open in early 2019
- $90 million for the Health Futures Hub Transformation Facility
- The $17 million Frankston Hospital Academic Centre is proposed to open early 2020 and to host clinical research and education facilities for Monash University and Peninsula Health
- The $8 million Rehabilitation, Ageing and Independent Living (RAIL) Centre and the Monash Addiction Research Centre (MARC)
- The $4 million Mental Health Research Centre (MHRC)
- $3.8 million in new Psychiatric Assessment and Planning Unit and refurbishment of the psychiatric inpatient unit

As part of the $138 million Health Futures Hub proposal $21 million is to be spent for specific initiatives including:

- $3 million foundational funding to establish the Health Data Platform (2019-2020)
- $6 million to fund activation of the Health Data and Implementation Platform with the required data infrastructure and expertise (2021-2023)
- $10 million to fund sentinel data and change management frameworks aligned to the two research themes (2021-2023)
- $2 million co-contribution to the Frankston Academic Centre

The Labor Government will also contribute $21 million for the Health Futures Hub.
