= Monash College =

Coordinates: 37°49′12″S 144°56′58″E

- Established: 1994
- Affiliations: Monash University, Jakarta International College, New Oriental, Universal College Lanka, Sunway College
- Location: Melbourne, Victoria, Australia
- Campus: Clayton, Melbourne City

Monash College is an educational institution in Docklands, Australia. It operates as a subsidiary of Monash University. Monash College is owned by Monash University, one of Australia's largest international universities. The college offers a diverse range of programs and services that align with various diploma programs offered by universities.

Monash College offers academic programs designed to help students transition into higher education, particularly to Australian universities. Business, government, and industry-related subjects are emphasized in its curriculum. Non-native English speakers can also take English language courses at the college.

The college offers work experience programs and initiatives focused on professional placement. Similar to the IB Program, Monash College and partners offering the college's program must follow the Unified syllabus, grading guidelines, and testing materials. Some affiliated colleges provide a direct pathway to Monash University upon achieving a specified pass score.
