= Ashwood =

Ashwood may refer to:

- Ashwood, Victoria, a suburb of Melbourne, Australia
- Ashwood High School, a government secondary school in Ashwood, Victoria, Australia, formerly known as Ashwood Secondary College or Ashwood College
- Ashwood School, a government specialist school in Ashwood, Victoria, Australia
- Ashwood, Oregon, a ghost town in the United States
- Ashwood, Staffordshire, a village in England
- Ashwood, South Carolina, a census-designated place in the United States
- Ashwood, Tennessee, an unincorporated community in the United States
- Ashwood, Texas, an unincorporated community in the United States
- Ashwood, Virginia, an unincorporated community in the United States
- Ashwood University, an unaccredited institution in Pakistan
