= Hockey Victoria =

Australian field hockey governing body

- Sport: Field hockey
- Abbreviation: HV
- Founded: 1948; 78 years ago
- Affiliation: Hockey Australia
- Headquarters: State Netball Hockey Centre
- Location: 10 Brens Dr, Parkville VIC 3052
- Chairman: Mike Trenery
- CEO: Andrew Skillern

Official website
- www.hockeyvictoria.org.au
- (Victoria (state))

Hockey Victoria (HV) is the governing body for the sport of field hockey in Victoria, Australia. It is responsible for the administration of intrastate competitions, state representative teams, officials and the financial position of the sport. Its office is located on the ground level of the State Netball and Hockey Centre in Parkville.

== Organisation Structure ==
HV is run by a small number of full- and part-time staff, including

- The CEO is responsible for overseeing the general operation of HV, and providing strategies for future development
- two Competition and Events officers, responsible for coordinating fixtures, officiating, club liaison, finals, internal competitions and State Championships, and hosting external competitions such as National Championships and International Tests
- a State Teams Manager, responsible for the selection and management of state representative players, staff (coaches and managers), and officials
- a Development Manager, responsible for grass-roots development of the sport, including the VicStix program, HookIn2Hockey implementation, and Rookey programs
- an Administration Assistant/Receptionist

== Logo ==
In the 1990s, the Victorian Hockey Association operated using a silver-and-black letter 'V'. When the Victorian Hockey Association, Victorian Women's Hockey Association and Victorian Junior Hockey Association amalgamated and became HV in 2003, the new peak body rebranded itself with a new logo. This represents a stylized 'V' and stylized hockey sticks, using the traditional Victorian colours of blue and white.

In September 2010, the HV logo was changed under a directive from Hockey Australia to bring the logos of all the State and Territory Associations into alignment, to demonstrate "that [the] sport is working together for the betterment of [its] members, ... [and to] demonstrate a modern and innovative look and feel and present [the] sport in a more professional way". This new series of logos uses the same image, an abstract person holding a hockey stick, for all Associations with the variation being provided in the colour scheme. HV's new logo uses navy blue, the traditional colour for Victoria, and orange, the alternate colour used by Victorian state teams in the event of a colour clash.

== Member Clubs and Associations ==
=== Melbourne Metropolitan ===
| Club | Colours | Nickname | Home Ground |
|---|---|---|---|
| Altona Hockey Club | | Seagulls | JK Grant Reserve, Altona |
| Bayside Powerhouse Hockey Club | | Saints | Albert Park, Brighton Secondary College |
| Brunswick Hockey Club | | Wickers | Brunswick Secondary College |
| Camberwell Hockey Club | | Wellers | Matlock Reserve, Camberwell |
| Caroline Springs Hockey Club | | Springers | Bridge Road Sports Complex, Melton South |
| Casey Hockey Club | | Cannons | Berwick Secondary College |
| Collegians-X | | Lions | Monash University, Clayton Campus |
| Craigieburn Falcons Hockey Club | | Falcons | Newbury Park, Cragieburn |
| Doncaster Hockey Club | | Donny | Mullum Mullum Reserve, East Doncaster |
| Eastern Christian Hockey Organisation (ECHO) | | | Ashwood Reserve, Ashwood |
| Essendon Hockey | | Bombers | Essendon Hockey Center, Ascot Vale |
| Footscray Hockey Club | | Bulldogs | McIvor Reserve, Yarraville |
| Frankston Hockey Club | | Stingrays | Monash University, Peninsula Campus |
| Greater Dandenong Warriors Hockey Club | | Warriors | Mills Reserve, Dandenong |
| Greensborough Hockey Club | | Burra | Plenty Park, Plenty |
| Hawthorn Hockey Club | | Hawks | Auburn Rd, Hawthorn East |
| HMAS Cerberus | | | HMAS Cerberus Naval Base, Crib Point |
| Hume Hockey Club | | Highlanders | Newbury Park, Cragieburn |
| KBH (Kew Box Hill) Brumbies | | Brumbies | Elgar Park, Box Hill |
| Knox Hockey Club | | Eagles | Wantirna Reserve, Wantirna |
| La Trobe University | | Gunners | Hardiman Reserve, Reservoir |
| MCC Hockey Section | | Dee's | Melbourne High School, Elwood College |
| Melbourne High School Old Boys | | Unicorns | Melbourne High School |
| Melbourne University Hockey Club (MUHC) | | Shoppers | Melbourne University |
| Maccabi | | | Elwood College |
| Melton Hockey Club | | Mustangs | Heathdale Christian College, Melton |
| Mentone Hockey Club | | Panthers | Mentone Grammar School Playing Fields, Keysborough |
| Monash University | | Farmers | Monash University, Clayton Campus |
| Mornington Peninsula | | Falcons | Monash University, Peninsula Campus |
| Old Carey | | | Elgar Park, Box Hill |
| Old Haileyburians Association (OHA) | | | Haileybury College, Keysborough Campus |
| Old Melburnians | | | Melbourne Grammar Sports Complex, Port Melbourne |
| Old Xaverians | | Xav's | Matlock Reserve, Camberwell |
| Old Yarra Valley | | | Yarra Valley Grammar School |
| P.E.G.S. | | | Penleigh and Essendon Grammar School, East Keilor |
| RMIT Hockey Club | | Redbacks | Essendon Hockey Club, Ascot Vale |
| Southern United Hockey Club | | Southern | Kingston Heath Reserve, Cheltenham |
| St Bede's Old Collegians | | | Mentone Grammar School playing fields, Keysborough |
| St Bernard's Old Collegians | | | St Bernard's College, Essendon |
| Swinburne | | Razorbacks | Elwood College |
| Toorak-East Malvern (TEM) | | Lions | Auburn Rd, Hawthorn East |
| Victorian Sikhs | | | Monash University, Clayton Campus |
| Waverley Hockey Club | | Panthers | Ashwood Reserve, Ashwood |
| Werribee Hockey Club | | Tigers | President's Park, Werribee |
| West Gippsland | | Strikers | Bellbird Park, Drouin |
| Yarra Hockey Club | | Yabbies | Cyril Cummins Reserve, Bellfield |

=== Regional Victoria ===
- Central Victoria Hockey Association
- Colac & District Hockey Association
- East Gippsland Hockey Association
- Glenelg Hockey Association
- Hockey Albury Wodonga
- Hockey Ballarat
- Hockey Geelong
- Latrobe Valley Hockey Association
- North Central Hockey Association
- Sunraysia Hockey Association
- West Gippsland Hockey Association
- Wimmera Hockey Association

== Competition Structure ==
HV administers a statewide, club-based competition, where self-administering clubs enter teams into the competition. All competitions are based on a promotion-relegation system of advancement, as outlined below.

=== Openage (Senior) Competition ===
There are two concurrent tiers of competition in Victoria - Premier League/Vic League and Pennant/Metro. There are 19 rounds of competition in the premier league and premier league reserves, other competitions are 18 rounds. In 2012 the competition was renamed from State League one to Premier League. With a change from 10 teams to 12 teams in the competition.

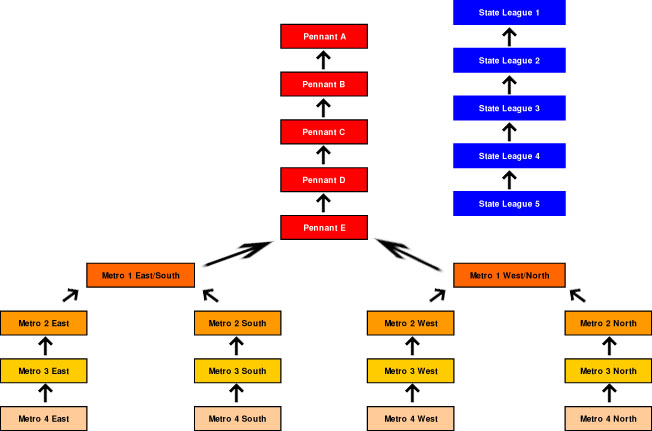
Diagram of the openage competition structure

==== Premier League Competition ====
In 2008, there were five State League grades for men and four for women. There is a maximum of ten teams per grade in State League. If a new club was to enter State League, they would have to enter at the lowest grade and earn promotion to the higher grades.

Clubs may only enter one team in the Premier League (PL), and this is treated as that club's "First XI" or highest-ranked team. Premier League (PL) is the premier competition in Victoria. After the renaming to Premier League at the end of 2012, the competition for premier league has two grades "Premier League" and "Reserves". A club playing in premier league automatically has a team in reserves. The number of clubs in premier league in 2019 is sixteen. To gain promotion to premier league a club must satisfy League Entry Criteria published by Hockey Victoria. The lowest team on the ladder in premier league is subject to demotion.

Premiership Winners - Premier League
| Year | Men | Women |
|---|---|---|
| 2026 | MCC Hockey Club | Waverley Hockey Club |
| 2025 | Southern United Hockey Club | Essendon Hockey Club |
| 2024 | Southern United Hockey Club | Hawthorn Hockey Club |
| 2023 | MCC Hockey Club | Camberwell Hockey Club |
| 2022 | Camberwell Hockey Club | Essendon Hockey Club |
| 2019 | Southern United Hockey Club | Hawthorn Hockey Club |
| 2018 | Southern United Hockey Club | Hawthorn Hockey Club |
| 2017 | Camberwell Hockey Club | Hawthorn Hockey Club |
| 2016 | Camberwell Hockey Club | Hawthorn Hockey Club |
| 2015 | Greensborough Hockey Club | Doncaster Hockey Club |
| 2014 | Greensborough Hockey Club | Hawthorn Hockey Club |
| 2013 | Camberwell Hockey Club | Greensborough Hockey Club |

Vic League Competition

1. Vic League 1
2. Vic League 2
3. Vic League 3

Premiership Winners - Vic League
| | Vic League 1 | | Vic League 2 | | Vic League 3 | |
| Year | Men | Women | Men | Women | Men | Women |
|---|---|---|---|---|---|---|
| 2026 | Hockey Geelong Sharks | TEM Hockey Club | Brunswick Hockey Club | Greater Dandenong Hockey Club | Gippsland Strikers | Melbourne High School Old Boys Hockey Club |
| 2025 | Greensborough Hockey Club | Greensborough Hockey Club | Werribee Hockey Club | Latrobe University Hockey Club | Greater Dandenong Hockey Club | ECHO |
| 2024 | Hockey Geelong Sharks | Melbourne University Hockey Club | Yarra Hockey Club | PEGS Hockey Club | RMIT and Gippsland Strikers (Split League) | Greater Dandenong Hockey Club |
| 2023 | PEGS Hockey Club | Yarra Hockey Club | WestVic Hockey | Latrobe University Hockey Club | Aussie Punjabi Sports Club | |
| 2022 | Old Xaverians Hockey Club | Monash University Hockey Club | ECHO | Casey Hockey Club | Frankston Hockey Club | |

==== Pennant / Metro Competition ====
Clubs may have one team in each grade of Pennant/Metro competition. They progress by earning promotion from lower grades to higher grades. Grades are typically limited to 10 teams per grade, although Metro may have fewer teams depending on team entries for that year. Pennant grades are statewide, but Metro grades are district-based to minimise travel distances. The Pennant/Metro grades are ranked as follows:

1. Pennant A
2. Pennant B
3. Pennant C
4. Pennant D
5. Pennant E
6. Pennant F
7. Pennant G (men's competition only)
8. Metro A (Location/Zone based )
9. Metro B (Location/Zone based
10. Metro C (depending on the number of teams)

Premier League and Premier League Reserves have a four-week final series as follows:

- Week 1:
  - 1st and 2nd Qualifying finals - 1st plays 4th and 2nd plays 3rd
  - 1st and 2nd Elimination finals - 5th plays 8th and 6th plays 7th
- Week 2: Semi Finals
  - 1st Semi Final - Winner of the 1st elimination finals plays loser of 1st qualifying final
  - 2nd Semi Final - Winner of the 2nd elimination finals plays loser of 2nd qualifying final
- Week 3: Preliminary Finals
  - 1st Preliminary final: Winner of 1st Qualifying final plays winner of 2nd semi final
  - 2nd Preliminary final: Winner of 2nd Qualifying final plays winner of 1st semi final
- Week 4: Grand final
  - Winners of 1st and 2nd Preliminary final

Pennant/Metro/Masters competitions have a three-week finals series as follows:

- Semi-Finals - The teams finishing 1st and 2nd after the regular season play in the "Qualifying Final", and the teams finishing 3rd and 4th play in the "Elimination Final"
- Preliminary Final - The loser of the Qualifying Final plays the winner of the Elimination Final
- Grand Final - The winner of the Qualifying Final plays the winner of the Preliminary Final

Teams finishing in the bottom two places of each pennant grade after the regular season are relegated to the next lowest grade in that competition. For example, the teams finishing 9th and 10th in PB will be relegated to PC for the next season. Teams being relegated from PD/PE to M1 will go to the most appropriate district of M1 if possible, with one team going to each district. Likewise for teams being relegated from M1 to M2.

Teams finishing 1st in each grade after the regular season (the Minor Premiers) are automatically promoted to the next highest grade in that competition. If that team also wins the Grand Final (the Major Premiers) then the team finishing 2nd in the grade is promoted. If the Minor Premier is not also the Major Premier, then the Major Premier is promoted. For example, Teams A, B, C and D finish 1st, 2nd, 3rd and 4th in SL2 respectively. A is automatically promoted to SL1, and if A wins the Grand Final, B is promoted as well. If A does not win the Grand Final, the team that does win is promoted instead of B, regardless of where they finished. Only the Minor Premier of each district of M2 is promoted to M1, and likewise for M1 into PD/PE.

=== Underage (Junior) Competition ===
Competition in the Underage competition is based on age, gender and grade. HV operates competitions for age groups under-16, under-14, under-12. Competitions also exist for under-18 and under-10. Under 18 and Under 10 are not graded competitions.

In each age group there are several grades, depending on team numbers, as follows:

1. 'A' or 'Shield A'
2. 'B' or Shield B
3. Pennant North-West & Pennant South-East
4. (District) North & South

As of 2020, competitions in Shield and pennant will be a girls competition and a boys competition, not mixed gender. District will be a mixed gender competition.

There is a nominal limit of 10 teams per grade, but this is relatively flexible depending on team entries.

Promotion is based on the performance of a club over a number of years, and is re-examined every year. For example, a team that finished on top of U14PNW may not necessarily be promoted to U16A the following year if that team are all top-age players (hence ineligible for U14 the next year) and the next group of players have performed poorly (for example the U14PNW team finished last in the same year).

Age groups are taken from 1 January that year. For example, a player who is 13 on 1 January would be eligible for U14 and U16 grades.

The A-grades have perpetual shields named after notable hockey personalities in Victoria:

- U16A Mixed- Ric Purser Shield
- U16A Girls - Ron Penpraze Shield
- U14A Mixed - George Stapleton Shield
- U14A Girls - Marg Tomlinson Shield
- U12A Boys- Ron Ford Shield
- U12A Girls - Ken Parkin Shield

All junior grades from U12 to U18 play a two-week finals series as follows:

- Semi-Finals - The teams finishing 1st and 4th after the regular season play in one semi-final, and the teams finishing 2nd and 3rd play in the other
- Grand Final - The winners of the two semi-finals play each other

=== Overage (Masters) Competitions ===
There are three separate masters competitions - Men's (Over 35 and Over 45), Women's (over 35), Men's (over 50). Ages are taken as at 31 December that year.

As for other competitions, 18 rounds are played and there is a limit of 10 teams per grade, except in the bottom grade.

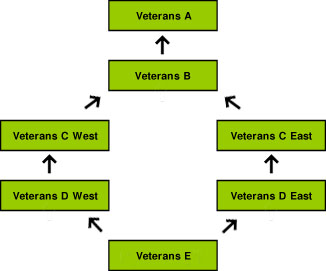
Diagram of the overage competition structure

Grades for the over-35 and over 45 tier are ranked as follows:

1. Masters A
2. Masters B
3. Masters C (men only)
4. Masters D (men only)

Over-50s are colloquially known as "SuperVets" and play in either A or B.

Teams finishing in the bottom two places of each grade after the regular season are relegated to the next lowest grade in that competition. For example, the teams finishing 9th and 10th in VA will be relegated to VB for the next season. Teams being relegated from VB to VC will go to the most appropriate district of VC if possible, with one team going to each district.

Teams finishing 1st in each grade after the regular season (the Minor Premiers) are automatically promoted to the next highest grade in that competition. If that team also wins the Grand Final (the Major Premiers) then the team finishing 2nd in the grade is promoted. If the Minor Premier is not also the Major Premier, then the Major Premier is promoted. Only the Minor Premier of each district in VC is promoted to VB.

=== Indoor Competition ===
Over summer HV runs an Indoor competition. There are competitions for men and women.

There are also underage competitions for under-18, under-15 and under-13 boys and girls.

A Victorian club championships for indoor is held each year. This runs in the age groups of Under 18, Under 15 and Under 13.

== Intra-State Championships ==
HV runs a number of intrastate tournaments throughout the course of the year.

=== Junior State Championships ===
==== Pre-2010 ====
Held during the week leading up to the first weekend in July, this was the premier intrastate Championship in Victoria. It consisted of five representative zones competing in a round-robin competition in under-13, under-14 and under-15 age groups in boys and girls competition. U13 and U15 State teams (or final trial squads) were selected from this tournament. Likewise this was the selection tournament for officials such as umpires to attend National Championships.

The competing zones were:

- Western Wildcats - green and yellow uniform. Comprised Altona, Brunswick, Essendon, Footscray, Lowther Hall, Melton, MUHC and Werribee clubs
- Eastern Hotshots - black and green uniform. Comprised Baw Baw, Camberwell, Knox, Hawthorn, MCC, MHSOB and Yarra Valley clubs
- Southern Sharks - purple and white uniform. Comprised Casey, Greater Dandenong Warriors, Frankston, Mentone, Mornington Peninsula, Southern United, St. Bedes, TEM and Waverley clubs
- Red Devils (North) - red and black uniform. Comprised Ajax-Maccabi, Box Hill, Doncaster, Greensborough, Kew and PowerHouse/St Kilda clubs
- Country Cobras - navy blue and white uniform. Comprised all affiliated regional associations including Geelong, Bendigo, Albury-Wodonga, Ballarat, Warrnambool, and Gippsland.

==== 2010 onwards ====
At the completion of the 2009 JSC, there was significant speculation that the structure of the Championship would be radically changed. Later that year, HV announced that the number of zones would increase from five to ten (6 metropolitan and 4 regional) and that the structure of JSC would be modified to reduce the time over which it was played. The age groups were revised to be U13 and U15 (run concurrently at the same event in July) and U17 (run separately in October). This brings the State Championships into alignment with the Hockey Australia National Championships (the U17 event provides players that will be U18 in the following April, when the U18 nationals is usually held).

The new zones are as follows:

- Southern Sharks - Purple and White - Bayside, Casey, Chadstone, Frankston, Greater Dandenong Warriors, HMAS Cerberus, Mentone, Mornington Peninsula, Old Haileyburians, Peninsula, Sandringham Women, Southern United, Southern Knights, St Bedes
- Central Flames - Red and Yellow - Elwood, Hawthorn, Maccabi, MCC, Melbourne High, Old East Malvern, Powerhouse/St Kilda, Swinburne, TEM
- North East Red Devils - Black and Red - Box Hill, Doncaster, Greensborough, Kew, Marcellin, Old Carey, Old Trinity, Old Yarra Valley
- Eastern Hotshots - Green, Red and Black - Camberwell, Collegians-X, ECHO, Knox, Monash Uni, Old Camberwell Grammar, Old Xaverians, Victorian Sihks, Waverley
- North West Tigers - Orange and Grey - Brunswick, Caroline Springs, Essendon, LaTrobe, Lowther Hall, Melton, Melbourne Uni, Parkville, PEGS, St Bernard's, Yarra Valley,
- Western Wildcats - Green and Yellow - Altona, Footscray, Geelong, Old Melbournians, RMIT, Sunshine, Werribee
- Southwest Country Eagles - Maroon and Black - Ballarat, Corangamite, Glenelg, Grampians, Portland, Warrnambool, Wimmera
- Gippsland Bulls (previously known as Southeast Country Cougars)- Blue and Red - Baw Baw, East Gippsland, West Gippsland, LaTrobe Valley
- Northeast Country Knights - Green and Blue - Golbourn Valley, Albury-Wodonga, Euroa
- Northwest Country Lightning - Blue and White - Central Victoria (Bendigo), Kerang, Maryborough, North-Central, Sunraysia, Wimmera

=== U18 Women's State Championships ===
Traditionally held over the Labour Day long weekend in March, this was a zone-based development tournament. There were typically 10 zone teams selected (Bayside, Central Suburbs, Western Suburbs, Western Highway, Outer Suburbs, Central State, Southwest Districts, Gippsland, Upper Murray, Murray Valley) and they competed in a round-robin phase, with a finals series on the Monday. Zone teams were selected from trials based on the senior club the players play for. This tournament was run for the last time in 2010, being replaced by the U17 State Championship (see above)

=== Country Carnival ===
Affiliated regional associations are invited to send teams to compete in the Country Champs. A senior & veterans competition is held over the Queen's Birthday long weekend in June, and a junior competition was held on the last weekend in June, immediately preceding the Junior State Championships.

In 2012, the Junior Country Carnival was moved to the last weekend in May. This was done to enable regional zones to select their Zone teams for JSC at the event (providing two months for training between this event and the JSC in July). Umpires for JSC from 2012 are also to be selected based on performance at the Junior Country Carnival.

=== VicStix ===
A round-robin tournament is held at the conclusion of each VicStix development program, as a way for the participants to showcase the skills they have learned throughout the program. As VicStix is regionalised, it is straightforward to play each region off against the others. It is typically run during March.

== State Teams ==
HV enters state representative teams in all national championships run by Hockey Australia. These include:

- Victorian Vikings and Vipers in the Australian Hockey League (AHL)
- Under-21
- Under-18
- Under-15
- Under-13 (this was made a full Hockey Australia national championship in 2011, but was sanctioned by HA before then)
- Country (open age)
- Masters

Additionally, indoor hockey teams are entered in:

- open
- U21
- U18
- U15
- U13

=== State Uniform ===
The traditional colours of the state uniform are navy blue with white highlights, and the alternate colour (particularly used for socks) is orange. Kombat was the official uniform supplier of HV from 2003 to 2009, when Victorian-based Cramark took over the contract. Speculation amongst players was that Kombat was too expensive and too slow, and this local manufacturer could produce uniforms quicker and cheaper. This was short-lived, however, as it appears Cramark went out of business. Kukri is now the official uniform supplier, as it is for almost all of the other States and Territories and the Australian national teams.

Under Kombat, the "Big V" (a white V shape on the front of the navy blue shirt, stretching from shoulder to navel to shoulder) was reserved only for Victoria's premier teams, the Vikings and Vipers. Cramark and Kukri have since introduced that design to all state teams from U15 upwards. The alternate is a white shirt with a blue V.

== Development Programs ==
HV has been involved in the implementation of its own statewide skills development program known as VicStix. It has also been active in providing affiliated clubs and associations with the tools to run the Hockey Australia-accredited HookIn2Hockey programs for primary-school-aged children, and Rookey programs for younger children.
