= Daniel Seymour =

Dan or Daniel Seymour may refer to:

- Dan Seymour (1915–1993), American character actor.
- Dan Seymour (announcer) (1914–1982), American radio and TV announcer who later became president and chief executive officer of the J. Walter Thompson advertising agency.
- Daniel Seymour (field hockey) in 2016 Men's Australian Country Championships
- Daniel Seymour (director) for Cocksucker Blues
