= Elwood High School =

Elwood High School can refer to:

- Elwood High School (Kansas) in Elwood, Kansas
- Elwood High School (Nebraska) in Elwood, Nebraska
- Elwood High School (Australia) former name of Elwood College in Australia
- Elwood High School (Newfoundland and Labrador) in Canada
