= Edith Rita Lowenstern =

Australian mathematician

Edith Rita Lowenstern (26 December 1904 – 1970) was an Australian mathematician.

She was born in Dandenong and educated at Melbourne Girls Grammar School and the University of Melbourne, where she captained the women's hockey team in 1924–1925. She then worked as a tutor at Melbourne before being appointed as lecturer at the University of Tasmania, becoming the first full-time female lecturer at that institution, as well as the second female mathematics lecturer in Australia.

Lowenstern resigned in 1936, married, and moved to Bicheno.
