= Australian Country Championships =

- Sport: Field Hockey
- No. of teams: 7
- Country: Australia
- Most recent champions: M: WA Country; W: QLD Country
- Most titles: M: NSW Country (7 titles); W: QLD Country (7 titles)
- Website: http://www.hockey.org.au

The Australian Country Championships are field hockey tournaments hosted annually in Australia. Unlike other National Australian Championships, the Australian Country Championships only comprise teams made up of players from country regions of each Australian state, as well as a team from the Australian Defence Force.

The 2016 edition of the tournament was held in Darwin, Northern Territory. Seven teams competed in both the men's and women's tournaments.

NSW Country were champions in both the men's and women's tournaments, defeating the ADF and QLD Country respectively. WA Country finished third in the men's tournament by defeating QLD Country, while VIC Country defeated the ADF to finish third in the women's tournament.

== Teams ==
The following are the teams from the 2017 tournaments.

- Australian Defence Force
- NSW Country
- NT Country
- QLD Country
- SA Country
- VIC Country
- WA Country

== Competition format ==
The tournament is played in a round robin format, with each team facing each other once. Final placings after the pool matches determine playoffs.

The fifth and sixth placed teams contest the fifth and sixth place match, the third and fourth placed teams contest the third and fourth place match, and the top two teams compete in the final.

== Competition rules ==
The Australian Country Championships have not adapted FIH rules of four 15–minute quarters, but instead use the old format of two 35–minute halves.

=== Points system ===
Result	Points
Win	3
Draw	1
Loss	0

=== Finals matches ===
During finals if games end in a tie, no overtime will be played and the higher ranked team from the pool matches will finish as a higher placing.

== Men's tournament ==
=== Results ===
- Note: The following summaries comprise results from 2014 onwards, while the tournament was founded earlier.

==== Summaries ====
Year	Hosts	Gold Medal Match			Third and Fourth		
Year	Hosts	Champions	Score	Runners-up	3rd place	Score	4th place
2014	Toowoomba, QLD	NSW	2–1	QLD	VIC	2–2	ADF
2015	Wollongong, NSW	NSW	0–0 (4–2 pen.)	VIC	QLD	6–1	WA
2016	Darwin, NT	NSW	4–1	ADF	WA	1–0	QLD
2017	Townsville, QLD	NSW	3–1	QLD	VIC	1–0	ADF
2018	Berri, SA	NSW	5–0	QLD	WA	5–1	ADF
2019	Shepparton, VIC	NSW	3–0	QLD	VIC	3–1	ADF
2022	Albany, WA	QLD	5–0	WA	VIC	3–1	NSW
2023	Shepparton, VIC	WA	1–0	VIC	QLD	4–1	NSW

==== Team performances ====
Team	2013	2014	2015	2016	2017	2018	2019	2022	2023	Total
ADF	4th	4th	5th	2nd	4th	4th	4th	5th	5th	9
NSW	1st	1st	1st	1st	1st	1st	1st	4th	4th	9
NT	–	–	–	5th	–	–	–	–	–	1
QLD	3rd	2nd	3rd	4th	2nd	2nd	2nd	1st	3rd	9
SA	6th	6th	7th	6th	6th	6th	6th	6th	6th	9
VIC	5th	3rd	2nd	6th	3rd	5th	3rd	3rd	2nd	9
WA	2nd	5th	4th	3rd	5th	3rd	5th	2nd	1st	9
Total	6	6	6	7	6	6	6	6	6	55

== Women's tournament ==
=== Results ===
- Note: The following summaries comprise results from 2014 onwards, while the tournament was founded earlier.

==== Summaries ====
Year	Hosts	Gold Medal Match			Third and Fourth		
Year	Hosts	Champions	Score	Runners-up	3rd place	Score	4th place
2014	Toowoomba, QLD	QLD	4–1	NSW	VIC	2–1	WA
2015	Wollongong, NSW	VIC	2–0	WA	NSW	2–1	QLD
2016	Darwin, NT	NSW	2–1	QLD	VIC	1–0	ADF
2017	Townsville, QLD	QLD	2–0	NSW	ADF	2–0	WA
2018	Berri, SA	QLD	1–0	NSW	ADF	2–1	SA
2019	Shepparton, VIC	QLD	1–0	NSW	VIC	6–2	ADF
2022	Albany, WA	QLD	1–0	NSW	VIC	1–0	ADF
2023	Shepparton, VIC	QLD	3–3 (4–2 pen.)	NSW	VIC	2–1	ADF

==== Team performances ====
Team	2013	2014	2015	2016	2017	2018	2019	2022	2023	Total
ADF	6th	6th	5th	4th	3rd	3rd	4th	4th	4th	9
NSW	2nd	2nd	3rd	1st	2nd	2nd	2nd	2nd	2nd	9
NT	–	–	–	5th	–	–	–	–	–	1
QLD	1st	1st	4th	2nd	1st	1st	1st	1st	1st	9
SA	5th	5th	6th	7th	6th	4th	6th	6th	5th	9
VIC	3rd	3rd	1st	3rd	5th	6th	3rd	3rd	3rd	9
WA	4th	4th	2nd	6th	4th	5th	5th	5th	6th	9
Total	6	6	6	7	6	6	6	6	6	55
