= Doncaster Hockey Club (Australia) =

- Full name: Doncaster Hockey Club (Australia)
- Nickname(s): Donny
- League: Hockey Victoria
- Founded: 1974
- Colors
- Home ground: Mullum Mullum Reserve, Donvale, Victoria
- Website: https://www.doncasterhockeyclub.com.au/

Doncaster Hockey Club is a field hockey club located in the north eastern suburbs of Melbourne, and competes in Hockey Victoria affiliated competitions. The club has over 400 members, competing in juniors, men's, women's and masters competitions.

Doncaster has teams in the Men's and Women's Premier League competitions, with a number of International and Olympic players representing for these teams. Doncaster caters to hockey players of all skill levels, and provides an inclusive environment to be involved in the sport of hockey.

Doncaster's home ground is located in the Melbourne suburb of Donvale, and boasts modern facilities, including a hybrid artificial turf, and the recently installed interactive electronic scoreboard

== Club history ==
Doncaster Hockey Club commenced playing in the 1974 season, comprising six junior teams and three senior teams. The club was initially based at Timber Ridge Reserve, before moving to George Street Reserve in 1977. Since 1986, the club has been based at its current location, Mullum Mullum Reserve, in Donvale.

Through its 50 year history, Doncaster Hockey Club have been involved in a number of milestones in the sport of hockey. One of the more important milestones was the establishment of introducing the concept of “Minkey” (MINi hocKEY), comprising six-a-side hockey on a smaller field, then called “Little Hockey”. Two years later it was embraced at a State level.

In 1985, it was the first club in Australia to control a sand-filled synthetic grass field, and in 1999, was the first Victorian based club to have a water-filled synthetic grass field. In 2008, a hybrid synthetic surface was installed, the first to be used at a Victorian based hockey club.

In 2015, Doncaster Hockey Club was made Hockey Victoria’s Inclusive Club of the Year.

== Premierships ==
The club has won a number of Premier League / State League 1 premierships during the course of their history:

- Women’s Premier League Premiers 2015
- Men’s State League 1 Premiers 2009
- Men’s State League 1 Premiers 1997
- Men’s State League 1 Premiers 1993
- Women’s State League 1 Premiers 1989
- Women’s State League 1 Premiers 1988

== Representative players ==
=== International players ===
Thirteen Doncaster players (10 men, 3 women) have represented Australia in the Kookaburra's and Hockeyroo's and several others at National Under 21 level.

=== Olympians ===
Six players from Doncaster have represented Australia at the Olympics:

- Josh Simmonds - Tokyo 2020
- Chris Ciriello - London 2012, Rio 2016
- Russell Ford - London 2012
- Andrew Smith - Beijing 2008
- Lachlan Elmer - Sydney 2000
- James Elmer - Barcelona 1992, Atlanta 1996

A number of other Olympians have played at Doncaster since representing their country:

- Joel Carroll - London 2012. Originally from the Northern Territory, Carroll joined the club in 2018 after relocating to Melbourne.
- Maria Romagosa - Beijing 2008 (Spain). On moving to Melbourne, Romagosa joined the club in 2014, and held numerous roles within the cub, including Junior Development Officer, Women’s Head Coach and Hockey Director.
- Sally Carbon - Seoul 1988, Barcelona 1992. On moving to Melbourne after her international career concluded, Carbon played in the Women’s State League 1 team. Carbon won hockey gold at the 1988 Seoul Olympics, and represented the Hockeyroo's from 1987 to 1994.

=== International representatives ===
The following Doncaster players have represented Australia in field hockey:

- Hayley Padget - Hockeyroo 2018
- Kiran Arunasalam - Kookaburra 2017
- Madi Ratcliffe - Hockeyroo 2016-18
- Jeremy Hiskins - Commonwealth Gold Medalist 1998
- Jason Manos - Champions Trophy 1996
- Kim Rayner - Hockeyroo 1989-1993
