= 2015 Women's Australian Country Championships =

Tournament details
- Host country: Australia
- City: Wollongong
- Teams: 6
- Venue(s): Illawarra Hockey Stadium

Final positions
- Champions: VIC Country
- Runner-up: WA Country
- Third place: NSW Country

Tournament statistics
- Matches played: 20
- Goals scored: 63 (3.15 per match)
- Top scorer(s): Brittany Parker (7 goals)

The 2015 Women's Australian Country Championships was a field hockey tournament held in Wollongong, New South Wales between 8–15 August 2015.

VIC Country won the tournament by defeating WA Country 2–0 in the final. NSW Country won the bronze medal by defeating QLD Country 2–1 in the third and fourth playoff.

== Teams ==
Unlike other National Australian Championships the Australian Country Championships only comprises teams from regional/country associations of each Australian State, as well as a team from the Australian Defence Force.

- ADF
- NSW Country
- QLD Country
- SA Country
- VIC Country
- WA Country

== Competition format ==
The tournament is played in a round-robin format, with each team facing each other once. Final placings after the pool matches determine playoffs.

The fifth and sixth placed teams contest the fifth and sixth-place match, while the top four placed teams contest the semi-finals, with the winners contesting the final, and the losers contesting the third and fourth place playoff.

== Results ==
=== Pool matches ===
Pos	Team	Pld	W	D	L	GF	GA	GD	Pts	Qualification
1	NSW Country	5	4	0	1	18	6	+12	12	Semi-finals
2	QLD Country	5	3	1	1	10	2	+8	10	Semi-finals
3	VIC Country	5	3	1	1	7	3	+4	10	Semi-finals
4	WA Country	5	2	0	3	4	13	−9	6	Semi-finals
5	ADF	5	1	2	2	9	10	−1	5	5th and 6th
6	SA Country	5	0	0	5	2	16	−14	0	5th and 6th

Source: Hockey Australia

=== Classification matches ===
==== Fifth and sixth place ====
14 August 2015
10:00

ADF	5 – 1	SA Country
Seaniger 25', 45', 57'; Duffy 28'; Underwood 31'	Report	Kelly 14'

Illawarra Hockey Stadium
Umpires:
Jessica Currie (AUS)
Vikki Robertson (AUS)

==== First to fourth place classification ====
Semi-finals
14 August 2015
NSW Country	1 (2)
WA Country (p.s.o)	1 (3)
14 August 2015
QLD Country	0
VIC Country	1

Final
15 August 2015
WA Country	0
VIC Country	2
Third and fourth place
15 August 2015
NSW Country	2
QLD Country	1

===== Semi-finals =====
14 August 2015
11:45

NSW Country	1 – 1	WA Country
Parker 65'	Report	Watson 48'
Penalties
Mayo (penalty shoot-out scored); Watterson (penalty shoot-out missed); Bosman (penalty shoot-out scored); Wheeler (penalty shoot-out missed); Parker (penalty shoot-out missed) —— Mayo (penalty shoot-out missed)	2 – 3	(penalty shoot-out scored) Fleay; (penalty shoot-out scored) Cooper; (penalty shoot-out missed) Williamson; (penalty shoot-out missed) Spencer; (penalty shoot-out missed) Harrington —— (penalty shoot-out scored) Fleay

Illawarra Hockey Stadium
Umpires:
Kate Cook (AUS)
Eliza Caldecott (AUS)

14 August 2015
13:30

QLD Country	0 – 1	VIC Country
	Report	Ryan 30'

Illawarra Hockey Stadium
Umpires:
Alisha Williams (AUS)
Emily Bowles (AUS)

===== Third and fourth place =====
15 August 2015
09:00

NSW Country	2 – 1	QLD Country
Parker 27'; Kristaly 43'	Report	Boyd 59'

Illawarra Hockey Stadium
Umpires:
Eliza Caldecott (AUS)
Emily Bowles (AUS)

===== Final =====
15 August 2015
13:00

WA Country	0 – 2	VIC Country
	Report	White 11'; Pearson 15'

Illawarra Hockey Stadium
Umpires:
Alisha Williams (AUS)
Kate Cook (AUS)

== Statistics ==
=== Final standings ===
Pos	Team	Pld	W	D	L	GF	GA	GD	Pts	Final Result
1st place, gold medalist(s)	VIC Country	7	5	1	1	10	3	+7	16	Gold Medal
2nd place, silver medalist(s)	WA Country	7	2	1	4	5	16	−11	7	Silver Medal
3rd place, bronze medalist(s)	NSW Country	7	5	1	1	21	8	+13	16	Bronze Medal
4	QLD Country	7	3	1	3	11	5	+6	10	Fourth Place
5	ADF	6	2	2	2	14	11	+3	8	Fifth place
6	SA Country	6	0	0	6	3	21	−18	0	Sixth Place

Source: Hockey Australia
