= Igloo supermarket and residence =

Historic commercial and residential buildings in Melbourne, Victoria, Australia

- Ctesiphon Concrete Supermarket and Residence
- Location of the site in Greater Metropolitan Melbourne
- Interactive map of Igloo supermarket and residence
- 37°52′03″S 145°06′19″E
- Type: Supermarket; house
- Etymology: Igloo
- Location: Ashwood, Melbourne, Victoria, Australia

History
- Built: 1954; 72 years ago
- Built by: McDougall and Ireland
- Built for: W. Wood
- Original use: Supermarket; house

Site notes
- Material: Concrete Ctesiphon-styled arches; timber
- Architect: Robin Boyd CBE
- Architectural style: Modernist
- Current use: Residences (x3)
- Owner: Private; strata
- Website: robinboyd.org.au

Victorian Heritage Register
- Official name: Ctesiphon Concrete Supermarket and Residence
- Type: Registered place
- Designated: 20 November 1997
- Reference no.: H1377
- Heritage overlay no.: HO15
- Categories: Residential buildings (private); Retail and Wholesale

The Igloo supermarket and residence are an historically significant former supermarket and current residences, co-located in Ashwood, an eastern suburb of Melbourne, Australia. Completed in 1954, designed in the Modernist style by Robin Boyd using a series of arches, patented as the Ctesiphon system of construction—modelled on the Arch of Ctesiphon—the concrete structures resemble igloos that integrates the walls and roof of each building into a singular structure.

The former supermarket and current residences were added to the Victorian Heritage Register on 20 November 1997 in recognition of their architectural and historical importance; and were added to a non-statutory list by the Victorian branch of the National Trust on 2 October 1995.

== Description ==
The Ctesiphon concrete system was developed in the United Kingdom and patented in Australia by local builders, McDougall and Ireland. The design is characterised by the use of a continuous, self-supporting arched timber structure that integrates both the walls and roof into a singular structural element, which is covered by eight centimetres (3 in) of concrete. The design eliminated the need for internal supports such as beams or columns, resulting in an open and unobstructed floor plan.

Robin Boyd designed the co-located supermarket and residence in 1952 for the then outer Melbourne suburb of Jordanville, now known as Ashwood. At the time, Jordanville was part of a public housing estate that was developed between the Holmesglen and Jordanville stations on the Glen Waverley line. Situated on a corner block, the supermarket faced Cleveland Road and the residence faced High Street Road, designed as a home for the owner of the supermarket; yet the structures were not conjoined.

The supermarket was constructed at a time when local small self-service supermarkets were replacing local general and corner stores and before the growth of large suburban shopping malls. Boyd's unique design proposed a monolithic method of concrete construction where concrete was poured onto a form made of timber arches, each 1.2 metres (4 ft) apart, with hessian suspended between. The dwellings featured a false ceiling that provided cross ventilation, and glazing of the windows and door was fitted directly into the concrete. The structures cost A£8,000 and were built for W. Wood.

By the time of construction the Ctesiphon system was already employed by Kevin Borland at the Rice House in Eltham and the Bellfield Community Centre at Heidelberg by Borland and Peter McIntyre. Only Rice House remains extant.

=== Use ===
The former supermarket that faces Cleveland Road was repurposed at some stage into a liquor store; and the single house that faces High Street Road was, at some stage, converted into two strata dwellings.

== See also ==
- Architecture of Melbourne
- Australian residential architectural styles
