= Waverley Hockey Club =

Australian field hockey club

- Nickname: Panthers
- Founded: 1958
- League: Hockey Victoria
- Based in: Melbourne Australia
- Arena: Waverley Hockey Ground Ashwood
- Colors
- Head coach: 2016 Travis Brooks Director of Coaching, Jason Brooks Men's Premier League, Rebecca Eastman & Renee Trost Women's Premier League

Waverley Hockey Club is located in the eastern suburbs of Melbourne, and competes in Hockey Victoria field hockey competitions.

Waverley is one of Australia's largest hockey clubs, with 800+ members in male and female, junior, senior and masters competitions. Waverley caters for players of all ages and skill level from social to elite level. Junior programs commence at 7 years and junior teams play in competition from Under 10 to Under 16.

Waverley has Men's and Women's Premier League teams playing in one of the strongest competitions in Australia. Waverley is diverse and has numerous grades available for all standards of men and women. Waverley also enters teams in Masters Over 35, 45 and 50 age group competitions.

Formed in 1958, the club has produced FIH International Coach of the Year and current Australia's Men's National Coach Colin Batch, international coaches, Australian & Victorian representatives, Australian Institute of Sport and Victorian Institute of Sport scholarship holders. Recently retired Waverley player Stacia Joseph is the current Victorian Institute of Sport women's hockey coach.

In 2004, Waverley players Travis Brooks and Stephen Mowlam won Olympic Gold for Australia at the 2004 Athens Olympics. Colin Batch was assistant coach of the Kookaburras Australia men's national field hockey team at that time.

== History ==
=== The beginning ===
In the years prior to 1958 the Elsternwick Hockey Club had seen many of its talented players cease playing when they married, as they purchased homes in the developing areas on the outskirts of Melbourne, and found it difficult to stay active members of the club. In 1958 the Mount Waverley area was one of the most rapidly developing suburbs in Melbourne. It was realised that at least nine Elsternwick players lived in this area, which prompted the Elsternwick hockey club secretary at the time, Arthur Slade to write letters to each, with the suggestion of forming a new club in the Mount Waverley area. So with the contacting of other players from other clubs who also lived in the area, there was enough support for the formation of the new club, and on 30 October 1958 at an informal meeting, the Mount Waverley Hockey Club was formed.

=== On the field ===
In its inaugural year, the Mount Waverley Hockey Club consisted of one team in C grade. Immediate on-field success followed and this team won three premierships in a row and promotion to B grade. A second team was entered in 1960, a fourth team in 1969, a seventh team in 1979, and a veterans team in 1981. Team numbers stabilised at eight. The Waverley men's team first played in the top grade in 1974.

With increasing development in the Waverley area, it was felt that the title of "Mount Waverley Hockey Club" was inappropriate, so in February 1964, the club was renamed the "Waverley Hockey Club".

The first junior team was entered in 1961, numbers increased rapidly to five in 1969, ten in 1974, twelve in 1981, and have now stabilised at nineteen. The junior teams consist of girls, boys and mixed teams ranging from under 9 to under 17. Waverley has one of the largest junior membership in Victoria.

In 1969 two recent school leavers from Mount Waverley High initiated moves to form the Waverley Women's Hockey Club. One team (mostly schoolgirls) was entered in the lowest grade of competition and finished fourth. A second team was entered 1970 and a third in 1972. The women won their first premiership in 1972. The number of teams increased to four in 1974, and to six in 1979. The women reached the top grade in 1985.

The men's and women's clubs operated separately but co-operatively from 1969, until their amalgamation in 1980.

Waverley has won the State League 1 / Premier League men's competition on 10 occasions and the women's 7 times, with numerous premierships in juniors and other grades. Many players have gained representative honours at national and international level.

=== The ground ===
The rapid growth in team numbers and the competition format limiting play to Saturdays meant that the club had to operate from a number of venues for many years. These venues included Syndal State School, Syndal Technical College, Sixth Avenue Reserve, Burton Street Reserve, Essex Heights Reserve, Larpent Street Reserve, Electra Avenue, Jingella Avenue, Waverley High School, Glen Waverley High School, Waverley Meadows Primary School, Gladeswood Reserve and Jells Park. The club did not have access to a pavilion until its thirteenth year of operation.

In the mid 1970s the Waverley council provided two grounds at Electra Avenue and a pavilion. One of these grounds was subsequently upgraded to an en-tout-cas surface, ground lighting was installed at club expense. Council subsequently extended an existing building at this reserve to provide excellent facilities shared by the hockey club and a senior citizens group. Waverley Hockey Club with the support of the City of Monash consolidated at Winbirra Parade, Ashwood and pioneered the installation of modern synthetic surfaces at club level in May 1986. Clubroom facilities were added in two stages through the 1990s. The two grass grounds provided at this venue were relinquished in the mid-1990s as more clubs installed synthetic surfaces.

Waverley installed a blue hybrid artificial turf in 2011, one of the first of its kind in the world. The clay coloured border of the surface references the en tout cas Electra Avenue grounds of the 1970s.

Waverley has over 40 teams entered at various levels of outdoor and indoor hockey. Highest quality facilities, strong relationship with the City of Monash, support from local business, elite coaching, progressive administration and the involvement of members and parents have contributed to ongoing success.

== The club ==
=== Premierships ===
Waverley has been a winner of the highest competition in Hockey Victoria, winning premierships in State League 1 / Premier League:

Men 1981, 1983, 1985, 1989, 1991, 2003, 2004, 2005, 2010, 2011

Women 1997, 1999, 2000, 2001, 2005, 2007, 2010

=== Victorian Vikings & Vipers ===
Waverley has produced numerous senior Victorian representatives. Currently, men's captain James Knee is in the 2016 Victorian Vikings Squad. The Victorian Vipers were previously coached by Waverley player Toni Cumpston high performance director at the Australian Sports Commission. Colin Batch also coached the Victorian Vikings. Both were head coaches at the Victorian Institute of Sport.

=== Australian Representatives ===
Waverley has produced numerous past and present Australian players, which include Colin Batch, Craig Fairbrother, Nigel Patmore, Matthew Dipnall, Treva King, Stephen Purcell, Stuart Carruthers, Brett Gray, Brett Thompson, Tim Thompson, Travis Brooks, Stephan Mowlam, Luke Doerner, Renee Trost, Leah Merrett, Stacia Joseph, James Knee and Rachel Guy.

These players have been involved in successful Australian teams at Champions Trophy, Sultan Azlan Shah Cup, Hockey World Cup, Commonwealth and Olympic Games.

=== Teams ===
In 2016 Waverley Hockey Club holds teams in all top divisions and has teams registered in the following divisions of the Hockey Victoria winter competition:

==== Men's ====
- Premier League
- Premier League Reserves
- Pennant A
- Pennant B
- Pennant E
- Pennant F
- Metro A
- Metro B
- Masters 35 A
- Masters 45
- Masters 50

==== Women's ====
- Premier League
- Premier League Reserves
- Pennant C
- Pennant E
- Metro A
- Metro B

==== Juniors ====
- U16 Shield Mixed
- U16 Shield Girls
- U16 Pennant
- U16 District
- U14 Shield Mixed
- U14 Shield Girls
- U14 District
- U12 Shield Mixed
- U12 Shield Girls
- U12 Pennant
- U10 District
- U10 District Girls
- Ages 7, 8, Minkey Hockey Teams
- Waverley Junior Hockey Academy

==== Summer and indoor ====
Waverley enters social and competitive teams in Hockey Victoria summer hockey competitions and indoor hockey teams.
