= 2014 Men's Australian Country Championships =

Tournament details
- Host country: Australia
- City: Toowoomba
- Teams: 6
- Venue: Toowoomba Hockey Club

Final positions
- Champions: NSW Country
- Runner-up: QLD Country
- Third place: VIC Country

Tournament statistics
- Matches played: 20
- Goals scored: 88 (4.4 per match)
- Top scorer: Alexander Mackay (9 goals)

The 2014 Men's Australian Country Championships was a field hockey tournament held in Toowoomba, Queensland between 2–9 August 2014.

NSW Country won the tournament by defeating the QLD Country 2–1 in the final. VIC Country won the bronze medal following a 2–2 draw with the ADF.

== Teams ==
Unlike other National Australian Championships the Australian Country Championships only comprises teams from regional/country associations of each Australian State, as well as a team from the Australian Defence Force.

- ADF
- NSW Country
- QLD Country
- SA Country
- VIC Country
- WA Country

== Competition format ==
The tournament is played in a round-robin format, with each team facing each other once. Final placings after the pool matches determine playoffs.

The fifth and sixth placed teams contest the fifth and sixth-place match, while the top four placed teams contest the semi-finals, with the winners contesting the final, and the losers contesting the third and fourth place playoff.

== Results ==
=== Pool matches ===
Pos	Team	Pld	W	D	L	GF	GA	GD	Pts	Qualification
1	NSW Country	5	4	1	0	25	6	+19	13	Semi-finals
2	QLD Country	5	4	1	0	17	4	+13	13	Semi-finals
3	VIC Country	5	3	0	2	11	11	0	9	Semi-finals
4	ADF	5	1	1	3	9	12	−3	4	Semi-finals
5	WA Country	5	1	1	3	8	12	−4	4	5th and 6th
6	SA Country	5	0	0	5	4	29	−25	0	5th and 6th

Source: Hockey Australia

2 August 2014
10:00

NSW Country	8 – 0	SA Country
Witchard 18', 54'; Fernance 25', 43'; Andaloro 50'; Mackay 51'; Jennings 60'; Alford 62'	Report

Toowoomba Hockey Club
Umpires:
Harley Schenk (AUS)
James Stewart (AUS)

2 August 2014
13:30

WA Country	1 – 2	VIC Country
Bean 12'	Report	Hargreaves 26'; Carlin 49'

Toowoomba Hockey Club
Umpires:
Nathan Chambers (AUS)
Simon Thresher (AUS)

2 August 2014
17:00

ADF	0 – 3	QLD Country
	Report	Garske 36', 38'; Short 50'

Umpires:
Paul Skippings (AUS)
Josh Harmon (AUS)

3 August 2014
08:15

NSW Country	5 – 1	VIC Country
Mackay 24', 63'; Fernance 31', 52' van der Schyff 41'	Report	Lougoon 56'

Toowoomba Hockey Club
Umpires:
Harley Schenk (AUS)
Simon Thresher (AUS)

3 August 2014
11:45

WA Country	1 – 3	QLD Country
J. Connolly 27'	Report	Maurice 6'; O'Beirne 28'; Hamill 54'

Toowoomba Hockey Club
Umpires:
James Stewart (AUS)
Paul Skippings (AUS)

3 August 2014
15:15

SA Country	2 – 6	ADF
Redemski 24'; Jeffrey 30'	Report	Waters 9', 46'; Buckett 22'; Nash 27', 66'; Hodinott 56'

Toowoomba Hockey Club
Umpires:
Paul Skippings (AUS)
Nathan Chambers (AUS)

4 August 2014
10:00

SA Country	1 – 4	WA Country
Redemski 25'	Report	Williamson 27', 50'; J. Connolly 33', 53'

Toowoomba Hockey Club
Umpires:
Harley Schenk (AUS)
James Stewart (AUS)

4 August 2014
13:30

QLD Country	3 – 0	VIC Country
Hamill 39'; Brownhalls 51'; Short 67'	Report

Toowoomba Hockey Club
Umpires:
Nathan Chambers (AUS)
Simon Thresher (AUS)

4 August 2014
17:00

ADF	1 – 4	NSW Country
Buckett 51'	Report	Mackay 8', 33'; Fernance 64'; Rowe 70'

Toowoomba Hockey Club
Umpires:
Harley Schenk (AUS)
Paul Skippings (AUS)

5 August 2014
08:15

QLD Country	5 – 0	SA Country
Short 44'; Garske 50'; Baker 52'; Brownhalls 56'; Bayliss 58'	Report

Toowoomba Hockey Club
Umpires:
Nathan Chambers (AUS)
James Stewart (AUS)

5 August 2014
11:45

WA Country	1 – 5	NSW Country
Hood 29'	Report	Whitehall 11', 57'; Mackay 38', 70' van der Schyff 53'

Toowoomba Hockey Club
Umpires:
Paul Skippings (AUS)
Harley Schenk (AUS)

5 August 2014
15:15

VIC Country	2 – 1	ADF
Jackson 4'; Lougoon 42'	Report	Nash 70'

Toowoomba Hockey Club
Umpires:
James Stewart (AUS)
Simon Thresher (AUS)

7 August 2014
10:00

NSW Country	3 – 3	QLD Country
Fernance 8'; Mackay 35+', 64'	Report	Catalano 33'; Garske 59'; O'Beirne 68'

Toowoomba Hockey Club
Umpires:
Josh Harmon (AUS)
James Stewart (AUS)

7 August 2014
13:30

VIC Country	6 – 1	SA Country
Lougoon 16'; Henderson 28', 30', 47'; Lahn 36'; Wallin 38'	Report	Redemski 60'

Toowoomba Hockey Club
Umpires:
Paul Skippings (AUS)
Nathan Chambers (AUS)

7 August 2014
17:00

ADF	1 – 1	WA Country
Buckett 65'	Report	J. Connolly 42'

Toowoomba Hockey Club
Umpires:
Simon Thresher (AUS)
Harley Schenk (AUS)

=== Classification matches ===
==== Fifth and sixth place ====
8 August 2014
08:15

WA Country	3 – 1	SA Country
S. Connolly 22', 26'; J. Connolly 55'	Report	Chester 53'

Toowoomba Hockey Club
Umpires:
Josh Harmon (AUS)
Paul Skippings (AUS)

==== First to fourth place classification ====
Semi-finals
8 August 2014
NSW Country	2
ADF	0
8 August 2014
QLD Country	1
VIC Country	0

Final
9 August 2014
NSW Country	2
QLD Country	1
Third and fourth place
9 August 2014
ADF	2
VIC Country	2

===== Semi-finals =====
8 August 2014
15:15

NSW Country	2 – 0	ADF
Andaloro 48'; Fernance 51'	Report

Toowoomba Hockey Club
Umpires:
James Stewart (AUS)
Harley Schenk (AUS)

8 August 2014
17:00

QLD Country	1 – 0	VIC Country
Short 31'	Report

Toowoomba Hockey Club
Umpires:
Simon Thresher (AUS)
Nathan Chambers (AUS)

===== Third and fourth place =====
9 August 2014
11:00

ADF	2 – 2	VIC Country
Watson 8'; Hill 48'	Report	Lahn 20', 33'

Toowoomba Hockey Club
Umpires:
Harley Schenk (AUS)
Paul Skippings (AUS)

===== Final =====
9 August 2014
15:00

NSW Country	2 – 1	QLD Country
Fernance 1'; MacPherson 19'	Report	O'Beirne 47'

Toowoomba Hockey Club
Umpires:
Simon Thresher (AUS)
James Stewart (AUS)

== Statistics ==
=== Final standings ===
Pos	Team	Pld	W	D	L	GF	GA	GD	Pts	Final Result
1st place, gold medalist(s)	NSW Country	7	6	1	0	29	7	+22	19	Gold Medal
2nd place, silver medalist(s)	QLD Country	7	5	1	1	19	6	+13	16	Silver Medal
3rd place, bronze medalist(s)	VIC Country	7	3	1	3	13	14	−1	10	Bronze Medal
4	ADF	7	1	2	4	11	16	−5	5	Fourth Place
5	WA Country	6	2	1	3	11	13	−2	7	Fifth place
6	SA Country	6	0	0	6	5	32	−27	0	Sixth Place

Source: Hockey Australia
