= 2023 Men's Australian Country Championships =

Hockey competition

Tournament details
- City: Shepparton
- Dates: 5–12 August
- Teams: 6
- Venue(s): Shepparton Regional Hockey Complex

Final positions
- Champions: (Western Australia) WA
- Runner-up: (Victoria (state)) VIC
- Third place: (Queensland) QLD

Tournament statistics
- Matches played: 20
- Goals scored: 95 (4.75 per match)
- Top scorer(s): (New South Wales) Brandan Horner (16 goals)
- Best player: (Victoria (state)) Jayden Schram

The 2023 Men's Australian Country Championship was a field hockey competition hosted by Hockey Australia and Hockey Victoria. The tournament was held at the Shepparton Regional Hockey Complex in Shepparton, Victoria, from 5–12 August.

Western Australia won the tournament, defeating Victoria 1–0 in the final.

== Results ==
=== Preliminary round ===
| Pos | Team | Pld | W | D | L | GF | GA | GD | Pts | Qualification |
|---|---|---|---|---|---|---|---|---|---|---|
| 1 | NSW | 5 | 5 | 0 | 0 | 22 | 4 | +18 | 15 | Advanced to Semi-finals |
| 2 | QLD | 5 | 3 | 1 | 1 | 13 | 9 | +4 | 10 | Advanced to Semi-finals |
| 3 | VIC | 5 | 2 | 1 | 2 | 16 | 5 | +11 | 7 | Advanced to Semi-finals |
| 4 | WA | 5 | 2 | 1 | 2 | 13 | 13 | 0 | 7 | Advanced to Semi-finals |
| 5 | ADF | 5 | 1 | 0 | 4 | 9 | 21 | −12 | 3 | |
| 6 | SA | 5 | 0 | 1 | 4 | 3 | 24 | −21 | 1 | |

Source: Hockey Australia
Rules for classification: 1) points; 2) matches won; 3) goal difference; 4) goals for; 5) head-to-head result; 6) field goals for.

==== Fixtures ====
5 August 2023
09:00

| QLD | 2–2 | SA |
|---|---|---|
| Love 3'; McPaul 30' | Report | Harkness 34'; Webb 49' |

Umpires:
Adam Smetana (AUS)
Cooper Alderton (AUS)

5 August 2023
13:15

| VIC | 6–0 | ADF |
|---|---|---|
| E. Anderson 9'; Erskine 10'; D. Anderson 34'; Rout 41', 56'; Wightman 45' | Report |

Umpires:
Bailey Davis (AUS)
Liam McLaren (AUS)

5 August 2023
16:45

| NSW | 6–2 | WA |
|---|---|---|
| Willott 7'; Gupte 15'; Schofield 17'; Horner 29', 43', 48' | Report | Sweeney 41'; Dalton 56' |

Umpires:
Peter Roberts (AUS)
Samuel Hamilton (AUS)

6 August 2023
10:45

| SA | 0–7 | VIC |
|---|---|---|
| | Report | Wightman 7'; Schram 22'; D. Anderson 22'; E. Anderson 34', 41'; Kerr-Nelson 47', 48' |

Umpires:
Cooper Alderton (AUS)
Samuel Hamilton (AUS)

6 August 2023
14:15

| QLD | 3–1 | WA |
|---|---|---|
| Profke 8', 16'; Hill 41' | Report | Dalton 12' |

Umpires:
Bailey Davis (AUS)
Adam Smetana (AUS)

6 August 2023
17:45

| NSW | 6–1 | ADF |
|---|---|---|
| Smith 2'; Horner 5', 14', 15', 47'; Drennan 29' | Report | Hurrell 57' |

Umpires:
Laim McLaren (AUS)
Peter Roberts (AUS)

7 August 2023
11:45

| ADF | 1–4 | WA |
|---|---|---|
| Robertson 40' | Report | Dalton 3', 56'; Souchon 29'; Overton 60+' |

Umpires:
Peter Roberts (AUS)
Cooper Alderton (AUS)

7 August 2023
15:15

| SA | 0–6 | NSW |
|---|---|---|
| | Report | Horner 15+', 25', 29', 46'; Gupte 30'; T. Searl 53' |

Umpires:
Samuel Hamilton (AUS)
Bailey Davis (AUS)

7 August 2023
18:45

| VIC | 1–2 | QLD |
|---|---|---|
| Kerr-Nelson 35' | Report | Hill 28', 43' |

Umpires:
Adam Smetana (AUS)
Liam McLaren (AUS)

8 August 2023
10:00

| ADF | 5–0 | SA |
|---|---|---|
| Robinson 11'; Rankin 21', 23'; Robertson 51', 55' | Report |

Umpires:
Adam Smetana (AUS)
Bailey Davis (AUS)

8 August 2023
13:30

| NSW | 3–1 | QLD |
|---|---|---|
| Horner 13', 43'; W. Searl 34' | Report | Profke 22' |

Umpires:
Liam McLaren (AUS)
Samuel Hamilton (AUS)

8 August 2023
17:00

| WA | 2–2 | VIC |
|---|---|---|
| Taylor 32'; Dalton 51' | Report | Schram 35'; E. Anderson 41' |

Umpires:
Peter Roberts (AUS)
Cooper Alderton (AUS)

9 August 2023
11:45

| QLD | 5–2 | ADF |
|---|---|---|
| McPaul 20'; Profke 38'; Popowski 42', 47'; Hill 45' | Report | Flint 24'; Robertson 60+' |

Umpires:
Cooper Alderton (AUS)
Adam Smetana (AUS)

9 August 2023
15:15

| WA | 4–1 | SA |
|---|---|---|
| Mills 2'; Parkes 27'; Dalton 51'; Sweeney 60' | Report | Burgess 26' |

Umpires:
Bailey Davis (AUS)
Liam McLaren (AUS)

9 August 2023
18:45

| VIC | 0–1 | NSW |
|---|---|---|
| | Report | T. Searl 6' |

Umpires:
Bailey Davis (AUS)
Liam McLaren (AUS)

=== Classification round ===
==== Fifth and sixth place ====
11 August 2023
17:00

| ADF | 3–1 | SA |
|---|---|---|
| Robertson 22', 40'; Hurrell 28' | Report | Grant 32' |

Umpires:
Cooper Alderton (AUS)
Bailey Davis (AUS)

==== First to fourth place ====
Semi-finals
11 August 2023
NSW | 2
WA | 4
11 August 2023
QLD | 1
VIC | 2

Final
12 August 2023
WA | 1
VIC | 0
Third Place
12 August 2023
NSW | 1
QLD | 4

===== Semi-finals =====
11 August 2023
09:00

| QLD | 1–2 | VIC |
|---|---|---|
| Piggin 28' | Report | Schram 35', 57' |

Umpires:
Peter Roberts (AUS)
Liam McLaren (AUS)

11 August 2023
13:00

| NSW | 2–4 | WA |
|---|---|---|
| Horner 38', 47' | Report | Tosana 2'; Taylor 19', 35'; Parkes 44' |

Umpires:
Samuel Hamilton (AUS)
Adam Smetana (AUS)

===== Third and fourth place =====
12 August 2023
09:00

| NSW | 1–4 | QLD |
|---|---|---|
| Horner 45' | Report | James 45'; Profke 49', 54'; Love 50' |

Umpires:
Adam Smetana (AUS)
Bailey Davis (AUS)

===== Final =====
12 August 2023
13:00

| WA | 1–0 | VIC |
|---|---|---|
| Dalton 40' | Report |

Umpires:
Liam McLaren (AUS)
Peter Roberts (AUS)

== Final standings ==
| Pos | Team | Pld | W | D | L | GF | GA | GD | Pts | Final standing |
|---|---|---|---|---|---|---|---|---|---|---|
| 1st place, gold medalist(s) | WA | 7 | 4 | 1 | 2 | 18 | 15 | +3 | 13 | Gold Medal |
| 2nd place, silver medalist(s) | VIC | 7 | 3 | 1 | 3 | 18 | 7 | +11 | 10 | Silver Medal |
| 3rd place, bronze medalist(s) | QLD | 7 | 4 | 1 | 2 | 18 | 12 | +6 | 13 | Bronze Medal |
| 4 | NSW | 7 | 5 | 0 | 2 | 25 | 12 | +13 | 15 | |
| 5 | ADF | 6 | 2 | 0 | 4 | 12 | 22 | −10 | 6 | |
| 6 | SA | 6 | 0 | 1 | 5 | 4 | 27 | −23 | 1 | |

Source: Hockey Australia

== Goalscorers ==
There were 95 goals scored in 20 matches, for an average of 4.75 goals per match.

16 goals

- Brandan Horner

7 goals

- Brayden Dalton

6 goals

- Matthew Robertson
- Zachary Profke

4 goals

- Jack Hill
- Ethan Anderson
- Jayden Schram

3 goals

- Liam Kerr-Nelson
- Fletcher Taylor

2 goals

- Matthew Hurrell
- Declan Rankin
- Niranjan Gupte
- Thomas Searl
- Wilson Love
- Joshua McPaul
- Keegan Popowski
- Declan Anderson
- Cale Rout
- Ewan Wightman
- Darren Parkes
- Liam Sweeney

1 goal

- Timothy Flint
- Matthew Robinson
- Zane Drennan
- Gus Schofield
- William Searl
- Cooper Smith
- Tyler Willott
- Callum James
- Corey Piggin
- Riley Burgess
- Connor Grant
- Lachlan Harkness
- Charlie Webb
- Hudson Erskine
- Hayden Mills
- Lachlan Overton
- Matthew Souchon
- Jack Tosana

Source: Hockey Australia
