= Hockey Geelong =

Australian field hockey governing body

Hockey Geelong is the governing body for the sport of field hockey in the region of the city of Geelong, Australia. HG coordinates men's, women's and junior local competition, as well as elite men's and women's squads in the Victorian State League conducted by Hockey Victoria.

== History ==
The first hockey team in Geelong was founded in 1954, traveling to Melbourne to compete on a weekly basis. The Geelong Men's Hockey Association was then formed in 1966, providing for local competition since then.

The association plays most of its matches on the synthetic pitch at Stead Park, Corio. Until 1992 Stead Park consisted only of grass fields, but in that year a sand-based synthetic turf was installed and stage 1 of the clubrooms constructed in their current locations. In 2008 this pitch was replaced with a hybrid (wet-dry) pitch. The Stead Park Master Plan (endorsed by the City of Greater Geelong on 28 January 2010) recommends the construction of a second synthetic pitch alongside the current one.

The facility at Stead Park was named the "Jim Kirk Pitch" in 2008 to honour the past president who was instrumental in the provision of both the 1992 and 2008 synthetic surfaces. The southern end of the ground is named the "Climpson Family End" and the northern is the "Burns Family End" in honour of two of the largest and most successful Geelong hockey families.

=== Awards ===
The association has a number of annual awards issued to members who demonstrate particular significance to Hockey Geelong as a whole. These include

- John Stephenson Memorial Award - most outstanding junior
- Best and Fairest Awards - each competition division, judged by 3-2-1 voting by the umpires after each match
- Hall of Fame - recognition of successful and dedicated players and officials
- Life Membership - awarded to exceptional, long term contribution to the Association both on and off the pitch
- Most Improved Umpire
- President's Shield - selected by the President of Hockey Geelong in that year, this is awarded to a club as recognition for contribution to the Association, development of juniors, or other criteria set by the President throughout the entire year

=== Local Competition Premierships ===
Year	Division 1 Men	Division 1 Women	Division 2 Men	Division 2 Women
1967	Belmont			
1968	Old Collegians			
1969	Belmont			
1970	Belmont			
1971	Winchelsea			
1972	St Josephs			
1973	Gordon			
1974	Saints			
1975	Bellarine		Winchelsea	
1976	Bellarine		Old Collegians	
1977	Bellarine		Old Collegians	
1978	Bellarine		Old Collegians	
1979	Corio		Old Collegians	
1980	Corio		Winchelsea	
1981	Bellarine		Leopold	
1982	Corio		Lethbridge	
1983	Saints		South Barwon	
1984	Corio		Winchelsea	
1985	Corio	Union	Saints	
1986	South Barwon	Geelong	Deakin University	
1987	South Barwon	Deakin University	Saints	
1988	Saints	Geelong	Winchelsea	
1989	Corio	Geelong	Teesdale	
1990	Corio	Geelong	Lara	
1991	Corio	Newtown	Corio	Deakin University
1992	South Barwon	Colac	Teesdale	Bellarine
1993	Corio	Geelong	Newtown	Deakin University
1994	Corio	Corio	Deakin University	Deakin University
1995	Winchelsea	Corio	Colac	Geelong
1996	Corio	Corio	Newtown	Geelong
1997	Corio	Corio	Corio	Deakin University
1998	Corio	Geelong	Saints	Corio
1999	Corio	Geelong	Saints	Saints
2000	Corio	Geelong	Newtown	Geelong
2001	Corio	Corio	Schools	Geelong
2002	Corio	Geelong	Winchelsea	Geelong
2003	Corio	Geelong	Winchelsea	Saints
2004	Saints	Corio	Saints	Saints
2005	Corio	Corio	Geelong	
2006	Corio	Corio	Corio	Deakin University
2007	Corio	Corio	Saints	Saints
2008	Corio	Corio	Saints	Saints
2009	Corio	Corio	Newtown	Newtown
2010	Corio	Corio	Corio	
2015	Saints		Geelong	

== Clubs ==
Club	Colours
Corio	
Geelong	
Kardinia International College (junior only)	
Newtown	
Saints	
Torquay	

== Former/Non-Playing Clubs ==
Club	Colours
Lara	
Winchelsea	
Christian College	
Deakin University	
South Barwon	
