= Minkey =

Modified form of field hockey

Mini Hockey
- Highest governing body: International Hockey Federation
- Nicknames: Minkey

Characteristics
- Type: field hockey
- Equipment: hockey ball, hockey stick, mouthguard, shinpads

Mini hockey, or minkey for short, is a modified form of field hockey designed for primary school children.

The game originated at Doncaster Hockey Club in Australia in the 1980s, then called Little Hockey. In the 21st century it is also known as HOOKin2HOCKEY, offered in under-7 and under-9 variants throughout Australia, on more-or-less quarter-area fields, and with modified rules. A similar game is popular in Canada, where it is generally referred to as "mini hockey." The Canadian version is usually unstructured and played by children with "mini hockey sticks" approximately 20 inches in length inside homes and schools, although some more structured leagues do exist.

== Field ==
The minkey field is a cut-down and simplified version of the full hockey field.

The dimensions of the field are as follows:

	Under 7 Mini hockey	Under 9 Mini hockey	Normal hockey
Length	40m	50m	91.4m
Width	25m	35m	55m
Length of defensive zone	10m	10m	22.9m (termed the "23 metre area")
Width of goals	2m	2m	3.66m

Note: The Mini hockey field sizes are approximate, and can be adjusted to suit the available space and size of players.

== Rules ==
Each field has at least one marker at each corner, on the centre line at each side, and 10 metres from each back line on each side. The goals consist of a marker on each side or some mechanism at least half a metre deep to catch the ball.

Mini hockey teams are made up of 6 players (in the under-7s game) or 7 players (in the under-9s game), of both sexes.

Games consist of two 15-minute periods. To start the game, a face-off is taken on the centre line. Each team is required to be in their own half prior to the ball being pushed. After each goal, the non-scoring team restarts the game with a face-off on the centre line.

The game is played without goalkeepers, so only the sticks may touch the ball. There is no half-circle (shooting circle) around the goal. Instead, a goal is scored when the ball is hit or pushed from within the opponents' defensive zone and then passes into or through the opponents' goal. If the ball goes over the sideline, the opposing team shall have a free push at the point where the ball crossed the line. If the ball goes over the back line, the opposing team shall have a free push on the 10 metre line opposite the point where the ball went over the back line.

A free hit (a free push for under-7 games) is awarded to the opposing team for any player:

- raising the stick above waist height;
- playing the ball deliberately with their feet or hands
- playing the ball deliberately with the rounded side of the stick
- raising the ball above knee height
- obstructing an opponent, i.e., placing their body between the ball and the opponent
- criticising or ridiculing another player or the umpire
- hitting another player or the umpire, or another player's stick with their own
- making up a third player playing the ball

All players must be 5 metres away when a free hit is taken. Accidental infringements in defensive zones result in a free hit to the opposing team on the 10 metre line, in line with the point where the infringement took place

== Safety ==
In the interests of safety, players are strongly encouraged to wear a mouth guard and shin guards for both training and playing. At no time should a player, coach, or any other person at mini hockey swing a stick so that it is raised above waist height. But some players do choose to wear goggles to avoid having their eyes gouged by an opposing player's stick. No team is allowed to have more than six players (for under-7s) or seven players (for under-9s) on the field at any one time.
