= 2014 Women's Australian Country Championships =

Tournament details
- Host country: Australia
- City: Toowoomba
- Teams: 6
- Venue(s): Toowoomba Hockey Club

Final positions
- Champions: QLD Country
- Runner-up: NSW Country
- Third place: VIC Country

Tournament statistics
- Matches played: 20
- Goals scored: 79 (3.95 per match)
- Top scorer(s): Kelly Gillard (9 goals)

The 2014 Women's Australian Country Championships was a field hockey tournament held in Toowoomba, Queensland between 2–9 August 2014.

QLD Country won the tournament by defeating the NSW Country 4–1 in the final. VIC Country won the bronze medal by defeating WA Country 2–1 in the third and fourth playoff.

== Teams ==
Unlike other National Australian Championships the Australian Country Championships only comprises teams from regional/country associations of each Australian State, as well as a team from the Australian Defence Force.

- ADF
- NSW Country
- QLD Country
- SA Country
- VIC Country
- WA Country

== Competition format ==
The tournament is played in a round-robin format, with each team facing each other once. Final placings after the pool matches determine playoffs.

The fifth and sixth placed teams contest the fifth and sixth-place match, while the top four placed teams contest the semi-finals, with the winners contesting the final, and the losers contesting the third and fourth place playoff.

== Results ==
=== Pool matches ===
Pos	Team	Pld	W	D	L	GF	GA	GD	Pts	Qualification
1	NSW Country	5	5	0	0	20	7	+13	15	Semi-finals
2	QLD Country	5	4	0	1	19	6	+13	12	Semi-finals
3	VIC Country	5	2	1	2	10	11	−1	7	Semi-finals
4	WA Country	5	1	2	2	5	12	−7	5	Semi-finals
5	ADF	5	1	0	4	5	14	−9	3	5th and 6th
6	SA Country	5	0	1	4	2	11	−9	1	5th and 6th

Source: Hockey Australia

2 August 2014
08:15

NSW Country	4 – 1	SA Country
Parker 40'; Bayliss 49'; McLean 60'; Chappel 70+'	Report	Allister 62'

Toowoomba Hockey Club
Umpires:
Helen Kura (AUS)
Morgan-Leigh Leeder (AUS)

2 August 2014
11:45

WA Country	2 – 2	VIC Country
Powis 35+'; Williamson 41'	Report	Kelsall 18'; Deppler 61'

Toowoomba Hockey Club
Umpires:
Catherine O'Brien (AUS)
Caroline Davis (AUS)

2 August 2014
15:15

ADF	1 – 6	QLD Country
MacArthur 61'	Report	Balfour 13'; Thompson 31', 33', 37'; Gillard 51'; Dredge 68'

Toowoomba Hockey Club
Umpires:
Laura Lee (AUS)
Alisha Williams (AUS)

3 August 2014
10:00

NSW Country	5 – 1	VIC Country
Bayliss 5'; Watterson 33', 46'; Parker 43'; McLean 52'	Report	Willmott 21'

Toowoomba Hockey Club
Umpires:
Helen Kura (AUS)
Catherine O'Brien (AUS)

3 August 2014
13:30

WA Country	0 – 5	QLD Country
	Report	Gillard 14', 44', 64'; Thompson 27'; McCurley 57'

Toowoomba Hockey Club
Umpires:
Laura Lee (AUS)
Caroline Davis (AUS)

3 August 2014
17:00

SA Country	1 – 2	ADF
Lunsmann 28'	Report	Casey 56', 69'

Toowoomba Hockey Club
Umpires:
Alisha Williams (AUS)
Morgan-Leigh Leeder (AUS)

4 August 2014
08:15

QLD Country	3 – 2	VIC Country
Gillard 3'; Neumann 27'; Benn 34'	Report	Deppler 10'; Shallard 65'

Toowoomba Hockey Club
Umpires:
Caroline Davis (AUS)
Helen Kura (AUS)

4 August 2014
11:45

SA Country	0 – 0	WA Country
	Report

Toowoomba Hockey Club
Umpires:
Alisha Williams (AUS)
Laura Lee (AUS)

4 August 2014
15:15

ADF	1 – 3	NSW Country
Wilson 3'	Report	Bayliss 19'; Watterson 38', 40'

Toowoomba Hockey Club
Umpires:
Morgan-Leigh Leeder (AUS)
Catherine O'Brien (AUS)

5 August 2014
10:00

QLD Country	3 – 0	SA Country
Thompson 11', 31'; Dredge 27'	Report

Toowoomba Hockey Club
Umpires:
Catherine O'Brien (AUS)
Alisha Williams (AUS)

5 August 2014
13:30

WA Country	2 – 5	NSW Country
Reed 21'; Fleay 59'	Report	Parker 7'; Alcorn 19'; Bayliss 41'; Chappel 43'; Willott 57'

Toowoomba Hockey Club
Umpires:
Caroline Davis (AUS)
Morgan-Leigh Leeder (AUS)

5 August 2014
17:00

VIC Country	3 – 1	ADF
Kelsall 53'; Ryan 60'; Lahn 64'	Report	Smith 70+'

Toowoomba Hockey Club
Umpires:
Helen Kura (AUS)
Laura Lee (AUS)

7 August 2014
08:15

NSW Country	3 – 2	QLD Country
Legge 49'; Mergetts 55'; Alcorn 70'	Report	Gillard 22'; Benn 66'

Toowoomba Hockey Club
Umpires:
Helen Kura (AUS)
Alisha Williams (AUS)

7 August 2014
11:45

VIC Country	2 – 0	SA Country
Ryan 28', 41'	Report

Toowoomba Hockey Club
Umpires:
Caroline Davis (AUS)
Morgan-Leigh Leeder (AUS)

7 August 2014
15:15

ADF	0 – 1	WA Country
	Report	Gallimore 23'

Toowoomba Hockey Club
Umpires:
Catherine O'Brien (AUS)
Laura Lee (AUS)

=== Classification matches ===
==== Fifth and sixth place ====
8 August 2014
10:00

ADF	1 – 2	SA Country
Casey 5'	Report	Hill 28'; Hammond 66'

Toowoomba Hockey Club
Umpires:
Alisha Williams (AUS)
Helen Kura (AUS)

==== First to fourth place classification ====
Semi-finals
8 August 2014
NSW Country	2
WA Country	1
8 August 2014
QLD Country	4
VIC Country	0

Final
9 August 2014
NSW Country	1
QLD Country	4
Third and fourth place
9 August 2014
WA Country	1
VIC Country	2

===== Semi-finals =====
8 August 2014
11:45

NSW Country	2 – 1	WA Country
Walter 10'; Legge 42'	Report	Harrington 35+'

Toowoomba Hockey Club
Umpires:
Catherine O'Brien (AUS)
Morgan-Leigh Leeder (AUS)

8 August 2014
13:30

QLD Country	4 – 0	VIC Country
Thompson 7'; Dredge 28'; Gillard 38'; Arthy 42'	Report

Toowoomba Hockey Club
Umpires:
Caroline Davis (AUS)
Laura Lee (AUS)

===== Third and fourth place =====
9 August 2014
09:00

WA Country	1 – 2	VIC Country
Parsons 56'	Report	Ryan 41'; White 65'

Toowoomba Hockey Club
Umpires:
Morgan-Leigh Leeder (AUS)
Laura Lee (AUS)

===== Final =====
9 August 2014
13:00

NSW Country	1 – 4	QLD Country
Watterson 21'	Report	Thompson 8'; Gillard 31', 37'; McCurley 61'

Toowoomba Hockey Club
Umpires:
Catherine O'Brien (AUS)
Caroline Davis (AUS)

== Statistics ==
=== Final standings ===
Pos	Team	Pld	W	D	L	GF	GA	GD	Pts	Final Result
1st place, gold medalist(s)	QLD Country	7	6	0	1	27	7	+20	18	Gold Medal
2nd place, silver medalist(s)	NSW Country	7	6	0	1	23	12	+11	18	Silver Medal
3rd place, bronze medalist(s)	VIC Country	7	3	1	3	12	16	−4	10	Bronze Medal
4	WA Country	7	1	2	4	7	16	−9	5	Fourth Place
5	SA Country	6	1	1	4	4	12	−8	4	Fifth place
6	ADF	6	1	0	5	6	16	−10	3	Sixth Place

Source: Hockey Australia
