= Ashwood High School =

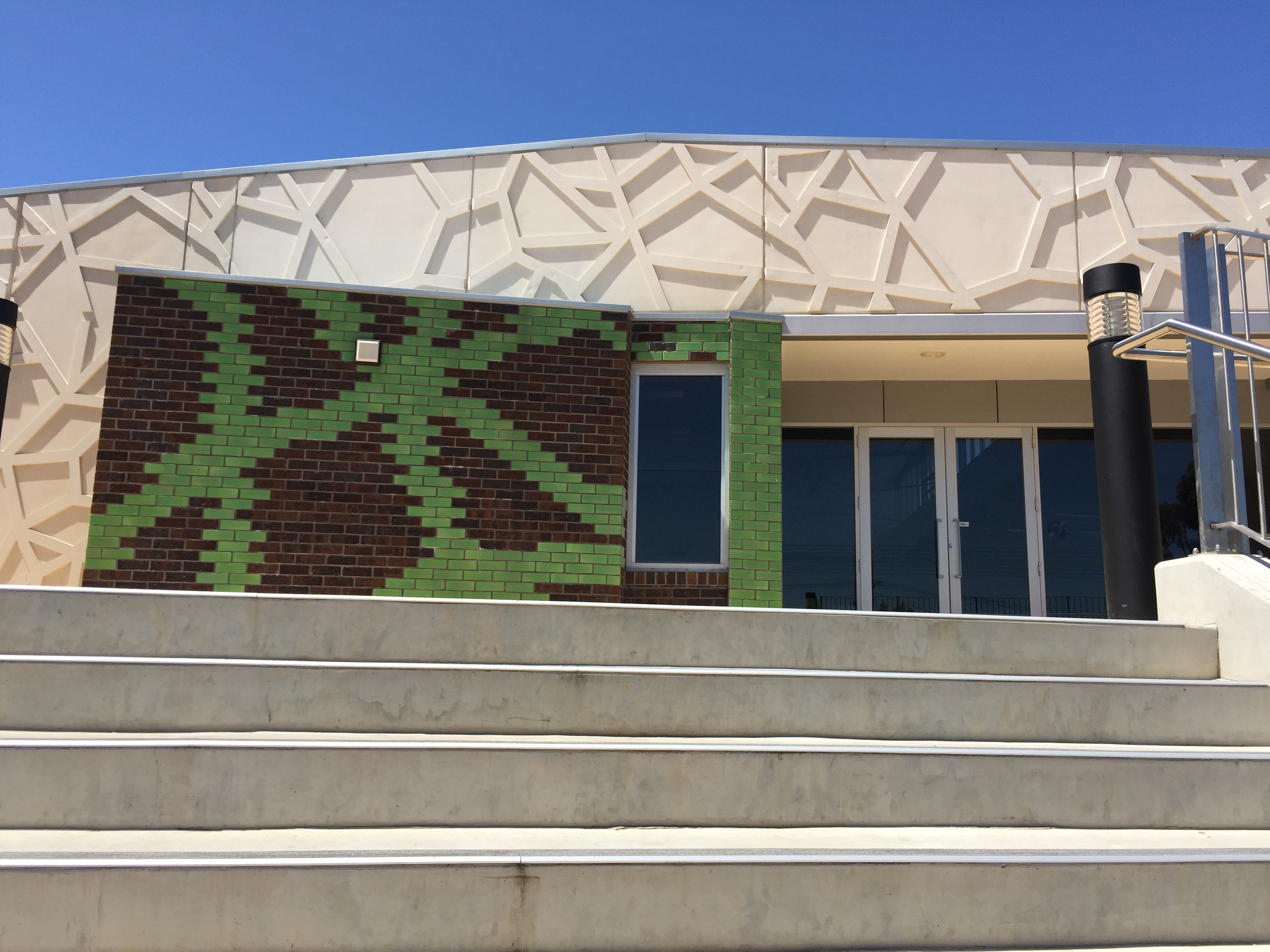

Location
- Ashwood, Victoria; Australia; 37.8648°S 145.1041°E

Information
- Type: Public
- Motto: Vision Inspired Action
- Established: 1958
- Principal: Brett Moore
- Years: 7–12
- Enrolment: 913 (2024)
- Campus size: 17 hectares (170,000 m^{2})
- Colours: Blue, yellow, red, green
- Website: www.ashwood.vic.edu.au

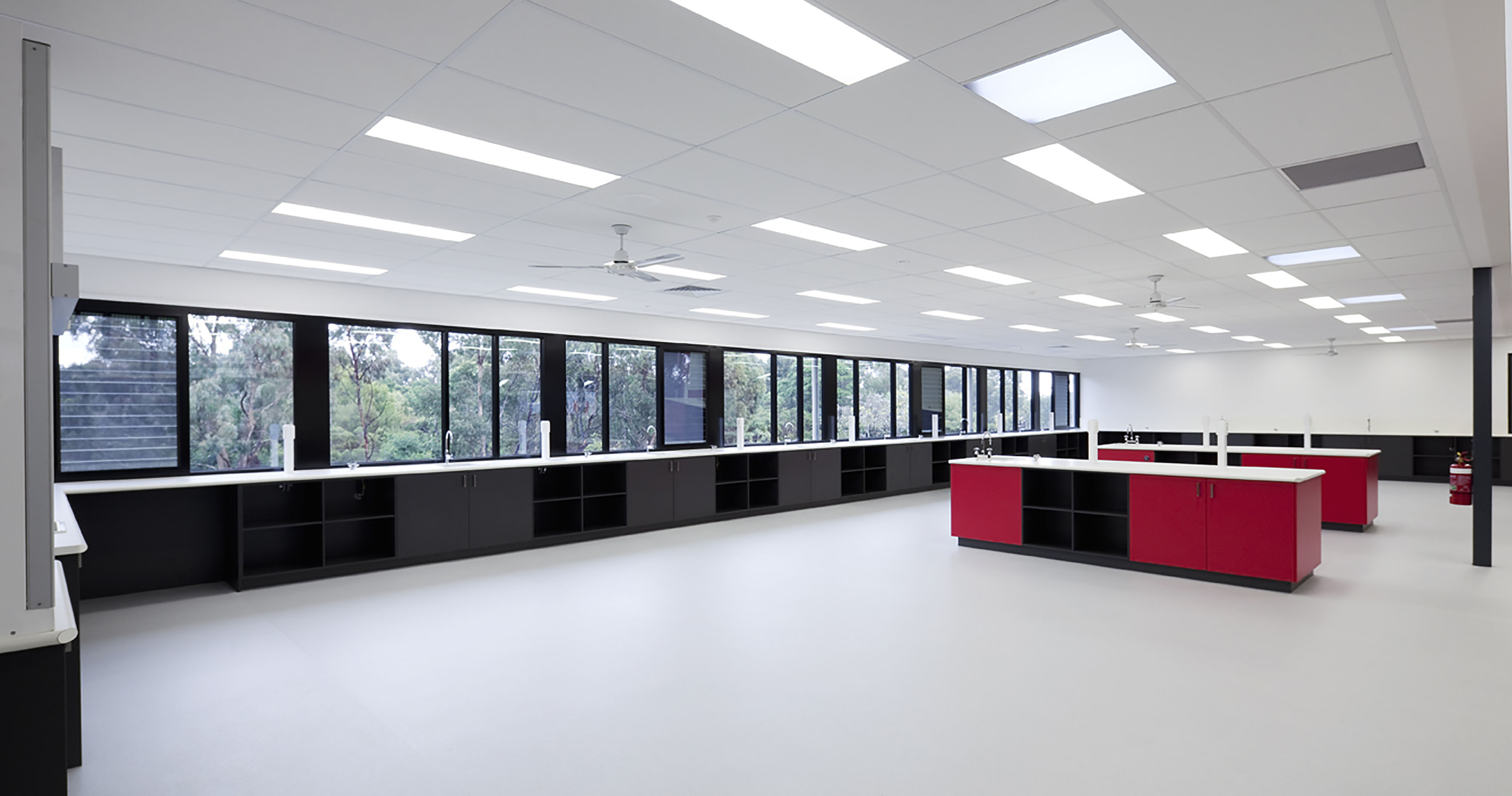
Ashwood High School's facilities

Ashwood High School is a co-educational public school located in Ashwood, Victoria, Australia.

The school offers a wide range of academic subjects and in 2016 introduced an accelerated curriculum and enrichment program (ACE). Preceding the 2022 Victorian State Election, in which the electoral district of Burwood was abolished, the school was the only secondary school in the district with an accelerated learning program. In November 2019, the curriculum has expanded to include an extensive arts program. In early 2013 the school was allowed a grant to rebuild numerous classroom facilities, which includes the Middle School Centre, which opened in late 2014, as well as the Senior School Centre, which opened in 2016. As of 2024, the school has 913 enrollments.

== History ==
Jordanville Technical School was the first secondary school located in the area and it opened in 1912, followed by Ashwood High School in 1958. Ashwood College was established in 1988 from the merger of Ashwood High School and Jordanville Technical School. The new school was located on the High School site, while the Technical School site, across the road, was eventually redeveloped for housing in 1993.

In 2010, the school was subject to an arson that caused $3.8 million worth of damage to the VCE wing of the building. A 14 year old boy and 19 year old man were arrested and charged in connection to the fire.

Ashwood High School (formerly Ashwood Secondary College / Ashwood College) was renamed 'Ashwood High School' in 2016. The notification of the change of name appeared in the Victoria Government Gazette No. G3 Thursday 21 January 2016.

In 2021, Ashwood High School received another grant from the Victorian Government to build a dedicated STEAM centre, designed for forthcoming STEAM subjects that are intended to contribute to the growth of the school. In 2021, the school also introduced the administrative subdivision into a Senior and Middle School.

== House system ==
The School uses a house system to group students, based on colours and the historic people on the Australian banknotes for $10 (AB 'Banjo' Paterson) $20 (John Flynn), $50 (Edith Cowan) and $100 (Dame Nellie Melba). The corresponding colour of the bank note is used to determine the colour of the house:

- Melba – Green
- Paterson – Blue
- Cowan – Yellow
- Flynn – Red

Students are sorted randomly into houses on the first day in Year 7.

== Alumni ==
- Rick Springfield, actor and singer.
- Robert Allenby, golfer.
