= Peter Mary Rookey =

Catholic friar (1916–2014)

Fr. Peter Mary Rookey, O.S.M. (October 12, 1916 - September 10, 2014) was a Servite Friar in the Catholic Church. Rookey was widely believed to have had the charism of healing, and spent a good part of his priesthood in that ministry.

== Life ==
Born in Superior, Wisconsin, on October 12, 1916. Rookey grew up in a family of thirteen. At the age of eight he was blinded by a Fourth of July firework. After about a year, his sight gradually began to improve, which Rookey credited to his mother leading the family in praying the rosary each evening after dinner "until little Peter's eyesight returns". On September 8, 1930, at the age of thirteen, he entered the Servite seminary. Rookey professed solemn vows on November 1, 1938, and was ordained a priest on May 17, 1941, at the Servite Our Lady of Sorrows Basilica in Chicago. It was then he adopted the middle name of "Mary". Rookey was fluent in seven languages.

Rookey served as Assistant Master of Novices, at Mt. St. Philip in Granville, Wisconsin, and then as assistant pastor at Assumption Parish in Portland, Oregon. He helped expand the Order to Ireland where he served from 1948 to 1953 as assistant master and then prior at Benburb Priory.

== Healing ministry ==
At Benburb, Rookey began the common Catholic practice of blessing people after Mass. It was in Benburb that it was first reported that people experienced healing when Father Rookey prayed for them, unbeknownst to the young priest. Hundreds attended healing services held there. Asked about this, Rookey would say: "It is God's work, not mine - He does all the healing, I just pray." The priest's popularity did not escape his superiors' attention, who took a very conservative position when it came to miracles such as healing. From 1953 to 1959 he was the Servite general consultor in Rome.

In the early 1960s Rookey served as the administrator of the Servite Catholic College of Louvain in Belgium and as a parish priest in Düsseldorf, Germany for several years until assigned to the Ozark missions in Missouri from 1967 to 1984 when he returned to Chicago to begin the second phase of his healing ministry.

A book was written about Rookey and his remarkable healings and exorcisms by Heather Parsons, Father Peter Rookey : Man of Miracles.

Peter Rookey was founder and director of The International Compassion Ministry (ICM) from 1986 until his death. In a 1994 Chicago Tribune interview Rookey said, "I say, use doctors and medicine when you are sick, but you also must pray. Because God gives the same wisdom to doctors that he gives to priests."

Rookey died in his sleep just short of his 98th birthday, on September 10, 2014, at Our Lady of Sorrows Monastery, Chicago, having been a priest for 73 years. Interment was in the Servite Section of Queen of Heaven Cemetery, Hillside, Illinois.

== Audio Recording of Father Rookey praying the Canticle of Love: Dolours Rosary and Miracle Prayer ==
A three part audio recording was made of Father Rookey praying the Canticle of Love: Dolours Rosary and Miracle Prayer that is available for download on the website= Padre Pio Devotion under audio, Canticle of Love.

== The Miracle Prayer ==
Lord Jesus, I come before You just as I am. I am sorry for my sins, I repent of my sins, please forgive me. In Your Name I forgive all others for what they have done against me. I renounce Satan, the evil spirits and all their works. I give You my entire self, Lord Jesus, now and forever. I invite you into my life, Jesus. I accept You as my Lord, God, and Savior. Heal me, change me, strengthen me in body, soul and spirit. Come, Lord Jesus, cover me with Your Precious Blood, and fill me with Your Holy Spirit. I Love You, Lord Jesus. I Praise You, Jesus. I Thank You, Jesus. I shall follow You every day of my life. Amen Mary, my Mother, Queen of Peace. St. Peregrine, the Cancer Saint, all you Angels and Saints, please help me. Amen.

== Obituary ==
Rookey O.S.M., Fr. Peter M. Servite Priest - A solemn professed friar and priest of the Order of Friar Servants of Mary (Servites) - United States of America Province, died Wednesday, September 10, 2014, at Our Lady of Sorrows Monastery, Chicago, Illinois. He was ninety-seven years of age and a priest for seventy-three years. He was born October 12, 1916, in Superior, WI and baptized at Sacred Heart Cathedral, Superior, WI. Fr. Rookey entered the Servite Order at Mater Dolorosa Seminary, Hillside, IL on September 8, 1930, and the Servite Novitiate, in Granville, WI on September 9, 1934. He professed solemn vows on November 1, 1938, and was ordained a priest on May 17, 1941. Fr. Rookey served as Assistant Master of Novices, Mt. St. Philip, Granville, WI; Assistant Pastor, Assumption Parish, Portland, OR; Assistant Master of Students, Mater Dolorosa Seminary, Hillside, IL; Assistant Master of Professed Students, Novices & Postulants, Benburb Priory, Benburb, Ireland; Servite General Consultor, Rome, Italy; Assistant Pastor, Our Lady of Sorrows Parish, Chicago, IL; Servite Foundations in Louvain, Belgium and Germany; Assistant Pastor, St. Marie du Lac Parish, Ironton, MO; and Founder & Director of The International Compassion Ministry. He was predeceased by his parents, Anthony and Johanna (McGarry) Rookey; and siblings, Rose, Chester, Gordon, Harold, Mary, Genevieve, Kathryn, Robert, Bernard, Dale, and Richard. He is survived by his brother, Earl; and numerous nieces, nephews and grand-nieces and nephews. Visitation will be Saturday, September 13th, from 5:30 p.m. to 9:00 p.m. and Sunday, September 14, 2014, from 3:00 p.m. to 8:00 p.m. at Our Lady of Sorrows Basilica, 3121 W. Jackson Blvd., Chicago, IL. The Mass of Christian Burial will be celebrated on Monday. September 15th at 11:00 a.m., preceded by a viewing from 8:30 a.m. - 11:00 a.m. and the recitation of Morning Prayer from the Office of the Dead at 10:30 a.m. also at Our Lady of Sorrows Basilica, Chicago, IL. Interment will be private. In lieu of flowers, please send donations to The Servite Friars - USA Province, at 3121 W. Jackson Blvd., Chicago, IL 60612-2729. Arrangements by Ahern Funeral Home (708)383-5700. Published in Chicago Sun-Times on Sept. 13, 2014
