= Melbourne University Hockey Club =

Australian field hockey club

- Nickname(s): The Shop, Shoppers
- Founded: 9 April 1907
- Home ground: University of Melbourne hockey pitch

Personnel
- President: Alana Butler
- Website: www.muhc.org.au

Melbourne University Hockey Club (MUHC), is a field hockey club affiliated with the University of Melbourne in Melbourne, Victoria. Players of all ages and skill levels, including both students and community members are welcome. Experience a supportive environment dedicated to promoting hockey, teamwork, and fitness while building lasting friendships.

Established in 1907, the club first competed in the Victorian Amateur Hockey Association (men) and Victorian Women's Hockey Association. In 1908, the first inter-varsity game was played in Adelaide. The club wears the traditional University of Melbourne colours blue and black.

In 2024, the club fielded seventeen teams in the Hockey Victoria men's, women's and master's winter competitions. The club also fields various teams in Hockey Victoria summer and Indoor hockey competitions. Unfortunately due to the timing of the 2024 Australian University Games, The University of Melbourne did not send men's or women's hockey teams, as the competition clashed with the academic semester and Winter Competitions finals series, but they look forward to participating again in 2025.
