= Ashwood, Victoria =

Ashwood
- Suburb
- Interactive map of Ashwood
- Coordinates: 37.867°S 145.103°E
- Country: Australia
- State: Victoria
- City: Melbourne
- LGA: City of Monash
- Location: 14 km (8.7 mi) from Melbourne

Government
  - State electorate: Ashwood
  - Federal division: Chisholm

Area
  - Total: 2.6 km^{2} (1.0 sq mi)
- Elevation: 47 m (154 ft)

Population
  - Total: 7,154 (SAL 2021)
- Postcode: 3147
Suburbs around Ashwood
Glen Iris	Burwood	Burwood
Ashburton	Ashwood	Mount Waverley
Malvern East	Chadstone	Mount Waverley

Ashwood is a suburb in Melbourne, Victoria, Australia, 14 km south east of Melbourne's Central Business District, located within the City of Monash local government area. Ashwood recorded a population of 7,154 at the 2021 census.

Ashwood was named after the suburbs of Ashburton and Burwood, because it is located between the two. It has the postcode of 3147, which it shares with the neighbouring suburb of Ashburton.

Ashwood is bounded by Huntingdale Road to the east, the Glen Waverley railway line to the south, Warrigal Road to the west and a wandering alignment to the north that approximately follows Carlyle Street, Zodiac Street, Gardiners Creek, Ashwood Drive, Montpellier Road and Arthur Street.

== History ==
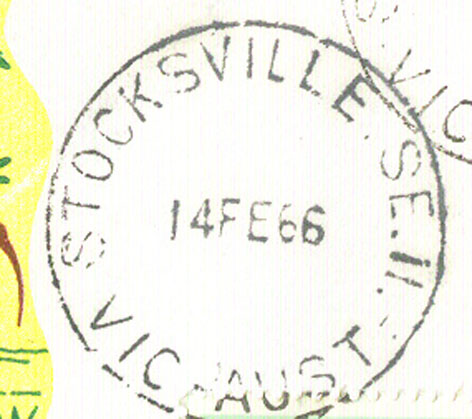
No longer an official name, but Stocksville Post Office was open until 1993

Until the early 1950s, when residential development commenced in the area, Warrigal Road formed the boundary of suburban development, with market gardens, poultry farms and unmade roads to the east. The new dwellings constructed at this time were typically double-fronted cream brick houses. By 1951 the population of Ashwood had risen to an estimated 1500 persons.

The Post Office opened on 3 October 1949, but was known as Ashburton East until 1951. Jordanville Post Office in the suburb opened in 1953. Stocksville Post Office, on Cleveland Road, was open from 1955 until 1993.

The suburb's name came from the first major housing development in the immediate area called Ashwood Heights, which was subdivided in early 1958 by Sunhill Corporation.

=== Heritage listings ===
The following places in Ashwood are listed on the Victorian Heritage Register:

- Igloo supermarket and residence, also known as the Ctesiphon Concrete Supermarket and Residence, on the corner of Cleveland and High Street roads

== Shopping centres ==
Ashwood shopping centre is a strip shopping centre located on Warrigal Road and includes a Woolworths supermarket to the south of High Street Road.

A smaller shopping locale is located at the corner of High Street Road and Cleveland Road. The surrounding area is also known as Jordanville and Stocksville. The former supermarket (now a liquor shop) and residence were designed by Robin Boyd in 1954 and are of architectural and historical significance, listed on the Victorian Heritage Register since 1997.

== Parks ==
Ashwood Reserve on Gardiners Creek includes hockey facilities for the Waverley Hockey Club and the grounds for the Harlequin Rugby Club. A bicycle trail through this reserve links it to Gardiners Reserve to the north. Electra Reserve to the east includes a dog club, croquet facilities and a senior citizens hall. Salisbury Reserve to the south has a scout hall and play equipment.

== Education ==
Ashwood High School is a government secondary college located on High Street Road. Adjoining the college is Parkhill Primary School, on Parkhill Drive which is a government-run primary school. Ashwood School, located on Montpellier Road was established in 1976 and caters for students aged 5 to 18 years old with mild intellectual disabilities. Ashwood Memorial Kindergarten is located nearby on Arthur Street. Ashwood Central Pre School is located on Yooralla Street.

=== Former schools ===
Jordanville Technical College (opened 1954) and Ashwood State School (opened 1953), both located next to Ashwood High School (opened 1958 – now Ashwood College) were both closed and the land redeveloped as a housing estate.

== Transport ==
The primary north–south roads are Warrigal Road and Huntingdale Road, while High Street Road is the primary east–west road. The nearest railway stations to Ashwood are Holmesglen to the west and Jordanville to the east, from the north western area of Ashwood the Ashburton railway station is the most readily accessible. Several bus routes connect the suburb to surrounding areas.

== Sport ==
The suburb has an Australian Rules football team competing in the Southern Football League.

Ashwood is home to the Melbourne Harlequins, a rugby union team competing in the Victorian Rugby Union premier division; and is home to the Waverley Hockey Club at the Ashwood Reserve Park, which competes in the Hockey Victoria competition.

== See also ==
- City of Waverley – Ashwood was previously within this former local government area
