= 2016 Men's Australian Country Championships =

Tournament details
- Host country: Australia
- City: Darwin
- Teams: 7
- Venue: Marrara Hockey Centre

Final positions
- Champions: NSW Country
- Runner-up: ADF
- Third place: WA Country

Tournament statistics
- Matches played: 24
- Goals scored: 138 (5.75 per match)
- Top scorer: John Fernance (11 goals)

The 2016 Men's Australian Country Championships was a field hockey tournament held in Darwin, Northern Territory between 24-31 July 2016.

NSW Country won the tournament by defeating the ADF 4–1 in the final. WA Country won the bronze medal by defeating QLD Country 1–0 in the third and fourth playoff.

== Teams ==
Unlike other National Australian Championships the Australian Country Championships only comprises teams from regional/country associations of each Australian State, as well as a team from the Australian Defence Force.

- ADF
- NSW Country
- NT Country
- QLD Country
- SA Country
- VIC Country
- WA Country

== Competition format ==
The tournament is played in a round-robin format, with each team facing each other once. Final placings after the pool matches determine playoffs.

The fifth and sixth placed teams contest the fifth and sixth-place match, the third and fourth placed teams contest the third and fourth-place match, and the top two teams compete in the final.

== Results ==
=== Pool matches ===
Pos	Team	Pld	W	D	L	GF	GA	GD	Pts	Qualification
1	NSW Country	6	5	1	0	27	5	+22	16	Final
2	ADF	6	4	1	1	21	14	+7	13	Final
3	QLD Country	6	3	3	0	27	15	+12	12	3rd and 4th
4	WA Country	6	2	2	2	19	13	+6	8	3rd and 4th
5	VIC Country	6	1	2	3	14	25	−11	5	5th and 6th
6	NT Country	6	1	1	4	13	21	−8	4	5th and 6th
7	SA Country	6	0	0	6	2	30	−28	0	

Source: Hockey Australia

24 July 2016
08:00

VIC Country	2–6	ADF
Jackson 21'; Cornwall 55'	Report	Fazel 10'; Fulcher 13'; Waters 34'; McClung 47'; Hoddinott 64'; Waters 68'

Marrara Hockey Centre
Umpires:
Nathan Jennings (AUS)
Adrian Cross (AUS)

24 July 2016
10:00

NSW Country	7–0	SA Country
Mackay 1'; Fernance 19', 60'; Witchard 23', 64'; Dillon 53'; Wright 59'	Report

Marrara Hockey Centre
Umpires:
Jai Brown (AUS)
Kristen Schenk (AUS)

24 July 2016
12:00

QLD Country	2–2	WA Country
Ramsay 5'; Harland 28'	Report	Squibb 8'; J. Connolly 45'

Marrara Hockey Centre
Umpires:
Simon Thresher (AUS)
David Grady (AUS)

25 July 2016
16:00

WA Country	3–3	VIC Country
S. Connolly 41'; J. Connolly 54'; Wenn 69'	Report	Newnham 39'; Jackson 45'; Rout 50'

Marrara Hockey Centre
Umpires:
Simon Thresher (AUS)
Kristen Schenk (AUS)

25 July 2016
18:00

SA Country	0–7	NT Country
	Report	Hullick 4', 15'; Seymour 5'; Quan 27'; Lowe 41'; Andrade 62', 65'

Marrara Hockey Centre
Umpires:
Nathan Jennings (AUS)
David Grady (AUS)

25 July 2016
18:00

ADF	0–3	NSW Country
	Report	Mackay 25'; Fernance 52'; Hanrahan 66'

Marrara Hockey Centre
Umpires:
Jai Brown (AUS)
Adrian Cross (AUS)

=== Classification matches ===
==== Fifth and sixth place ====
31 July 2016
13:30

VIC Country	4–5	NT Country
Thomson 15'; Jackson 17'; Ferrier 21'; Cullen 48'	Report	Andrade 5'; Wallin 34', 54', 56', 65'

Marrara Hockey Centre
Umpires:
Kristen Schenk (AUS)
David Grady (AUS)

==== Third and fourth place ====
31 July 2016
16:00

QLD Country	0–1	WA Country
	Report	Corner 4'

Marrara Hockey Centre
Umpires:
Nathan Jennings (AUS)
Jai Brown (AUS)

==== Final ====
31 July 2016
18:00

NSW Country	4–1	ADF
Mackay 5'; Dillon 9'; Hanrahan 20'; Wright 54'	Report	Fazel 35'

Marrara Hockey Centre
Umpires:
Simon Thresher (AUS)
Adrian Cross (AUS)

== Statistics ==
=== Final standings ===
Pos	Team	Pld	W	D	L	GF	GA	GD	Pts	Final Result
1st place, gold medalist(s)	NSW Country	7	6	1	0	31	6	+25	19	Gold Medal
2nd place, silver medalist(s)	ADF	7	4	1	2	22	18	+4	13	Silver Medal
3rd place, bronze medalist(s)	WA Country	7	3	2	2	20	13	+7	11	Bronze Medal
4	QLD Country	7	3	3	1	27	16	+11	12	Fourth Place
5	NT Country	7	2	1	4	18	25	−7	7	Fifth place
6	VIC Country	7	1	2	4	18	30	−12	5	Sixth Place
7	SA Country	6	0	0	6	2	30	−28	0	Seventh Place

Source: Hockey Australia
