= Ashwood School, Melbourne =

Ashwood School

Location
- Ashwood, Victoria; Australia; 37.8592°S 145.107°E

Information
- Established: 1976
- Principal: Helen Hatherly OAM
- Gender: Co-educational
- Age: 5 to 18
- Website: ashwoodsch.vic.edu.au/

Ashwood School is a coeducational specialist school, located on Montpellier Road, Ashwood, Victoria. It was established in 1976 and caters for students aged 5 to 18 years old with mild intellectual disabilities.

The principal of the school is Helen Hatherly OAM.
