= Elwood College =

Location
- 101 Glen Huntly Road; Elwood, Victoria, 3184; Australia; 37.8822°S 144.9852°E

Information
- Former name: Elwood High School
- Type: Public
- Motto: Together We Grow
- Established: 1957
- Head of school: Todd Asensio
- Grades: 7–12
- Enrolment: 700+
- Hours in school day: 6 hours and 20 minutes
- Houses: Milton, Keats, Lawson, Byron
- Colours: Blue, teal, white and gray
- Website: elwood.vic.edu.au

Elwood College is a co-educational state high school in Melbourne, Victoria, Australia. The school was founded in 1957 and was originally named Elwood High School. It has more than 700 students, including international students. The school's former principal was Rhonda Holt, and the current principal is Todd Asensio. The curriculum includes English, mathematics, humanities, health, technology, physical education, music, art, Japanese and French.

== School partnerships ==
- Japan: Obu Higashi Senior High School
