= Ashburton, Victoria =

Ashburton
- Suburb
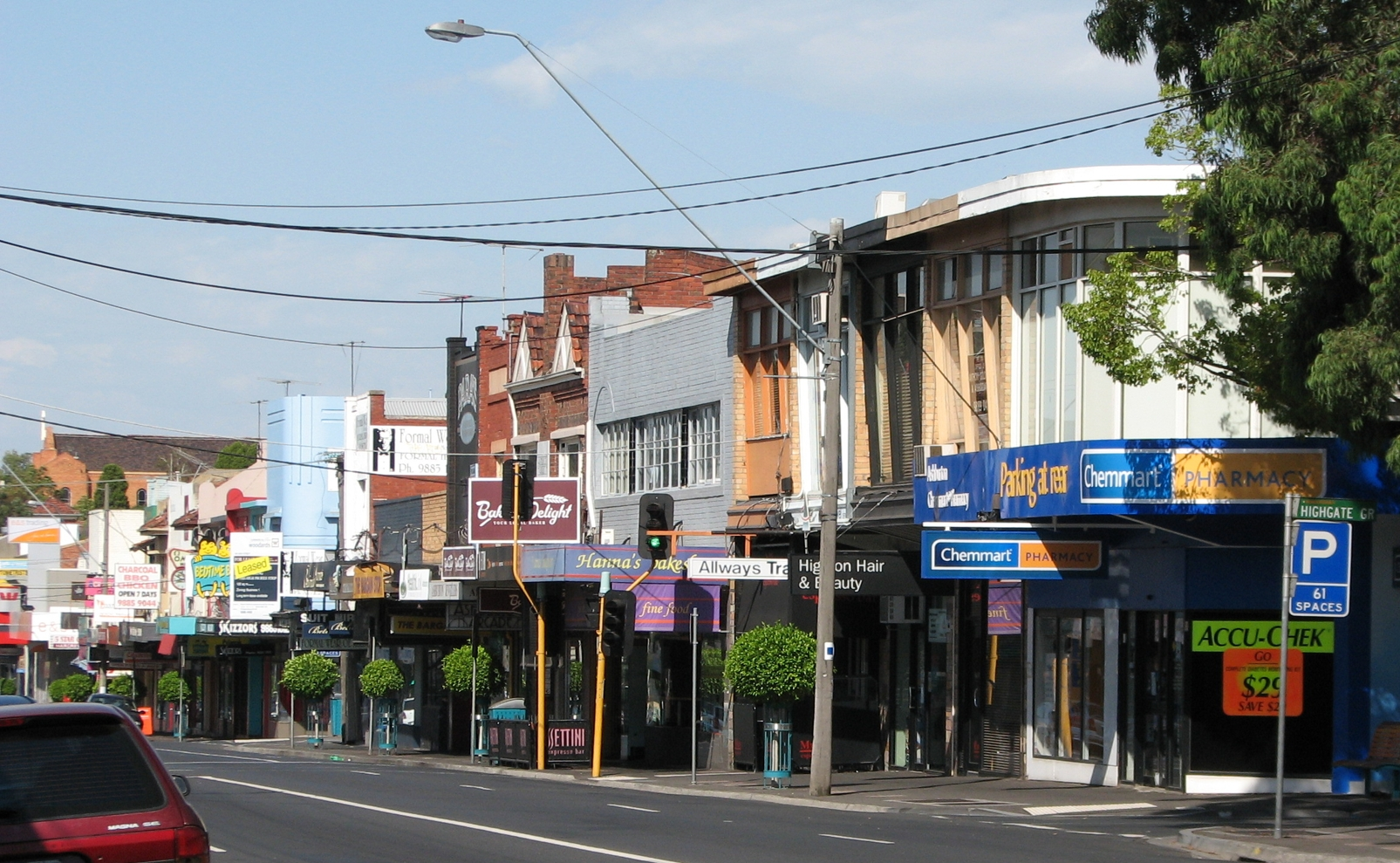
- High Street, Ashburton

- Interactive map of Ashburton
- Coordinates: 37°52′1″S 145°4′59″E
- Country: Australia
- State: Victoria
- City: Melbourne
- LGA: City of Boroondara
- Location: 12 km (7.5 mi) from Melbourne

Government
  - State electorate: Ashwood
  - Federal division: Chisholm

Area
  - Total: 2.9 km^{2} (1.1 sq mi)
- Elevation: 60 m (200 ft)

Population
  - Total: 7,952 (SAL 2021)
- Postcode: 3147
Suburbs around Ashburton
Glen Iris	Glen Iris	Burwood
Malvern	Ashburton	Ashwood
Malvern East	Malvern East	Chadstone

Ashburton is a suburb of Melbourne, Victoria, Australia, 12 km (7.5 mi) southeast of Melbourne's Central Business District, located within the City of Boroondara local government area. Ashburton recorded a population of 7,952 at the 2021 census.

Ashburton is known for the Ashburton Village shopping strip, the Ashburton Community Centre and the Ashburton Library on High Street. Nearby Warner Avenue hosts the Ashburton Pool and Recreation Centre and the Ashburton Seniors Centre. It is in close proximity to the Holmesglen Institute of TAFE, Monash University (Caulfield and Clayton campuses), Deakin University (Burwood campus) and Swinburne University (Hawthorn campus).

== History ==
The Outer Circle Railway, originally from Oakleigh to Melbourne via Fairfield, was abbreviated to spur lines from Camberwell within a few years, northwards to Deepdene and southwards to Norwood Station by 1891. Norwood was changed to Ashburton, at the suggestion of a former local councillor, E. Dillon who had lived in Ashburton Terrace, Cork, Ireland. The area took its name from the station.

An unrealised objective of the railway line was to stimulate residential development, but at the time the locality was best known for the Ashburton Forest, overlooking Gardiners Creek, as a site for picnics. The 'Ashy Dasher', a dedicated steam train, brought day-trippers to the Forest.

In the 1920s Ashburton had a few shops, orchards and market gardens, supporting sufficient population for a primary school to be opened in 1928 (549 pupils, 2014). There was a public hall in High Street Road near Johnston Street where Catholic and Presbyterian church services were held in the late 1920s. By the end of the decade, sub-divisions on the north side of High Street began to urbanise the area. Ashburton Primary School on Fakenham Road opened in 1928.

In 1948 the railway line was extended to Alamein Station for the residents of the housing built by the Housing Commission of Victoria. In honour of returned servicemen and women who occupied much of the new estate, the streets of the new area were named after World War II sites in the Pacific and Western Desert campaigns, and war-time aircraft and flying boats. Street names include Victory Boulevard, Benghazi Avenue, Tobruk Road, Ambon Street, Huon Grove, Lancaster Street, and Liberator Street. The Solway school opened in 1950 with the name Darling East. It was renamed Solway in 1956 after the Postmaster-General's Department opened in Solway post office near Solway Street.

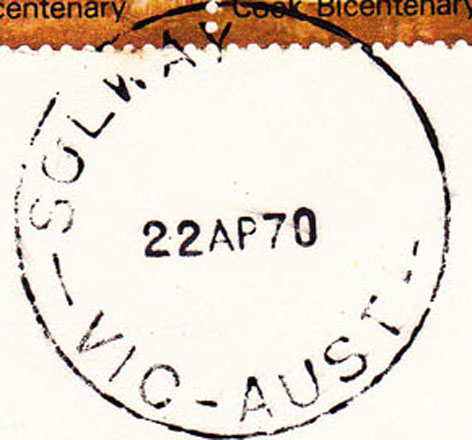
Solway postmark (SE11 postal district sorting code is missing)

The rail line was electrified in 1924, and the Ashburton Post Office opened on 15 December 1927. Another office was opened at Solway (in the south-west of the suburb) and operated from 1954 until 1978.

In 2021, Ashburton residents were found to have the longest lifespan of any residents in Victoria.

== Transport ==
The suburb is serviced by Ashburton and Alamein railway stations, which are on the Alamein railway line. The 734 bus route also runs along High Street.

== Education ==
There are three primary schools serving the suburb:

- St Michael's Parish School
- Solway Primary School
- Ashburton Primary School

There is one high school serving the suburb:

- Ashwood High School

== Religious services ==
The suburb contains several religious institutions:

- The Ashburton Baptist Church runs the House of Hope for people seeking asylum.
- Ashburton Uniting Church provides housing for people with mild intellectual disabilities.
- Ashburton Presbyterian Church provides English conversation classes for Beginner, Intermediate and Advanced students.
- St Michaels Parish Church (Catholic)
- St. Matthews Anglican Church and the Melbourne Church of South India Church

== Recreation ==
Ashburton hosts the following recreational interests:

- Ashburton Pool and Recreation Centre (YMCA)
- Solway Basketball Club and Ashy Basketball Club field teams for boys and girls from under 8s to under 23s. Competitions are held at the Waverley Basketball Stadium and they act as feeder clubs for representative basketball club Waverley Falcons.
- Auskick at Watson Park and Ferndale Park
- Ashburton United Soccer Club, including Ashburton Women's Soccer Club
- Ashburton United Junior Football Club (The Ashy Redbacks) Including girls teams.
- Ashburton Young Cricketers (AYC) Cricket Club
- Ashburton Willows Cricket Club
- Ashburton Bowls Club
- Ashburton Netball Club
- Ashburton Uniting Church Tennis Club
- Ashburton Riders Club a cycling club with regular rides departing from Ashburton Station.

The Gardiners Creek Trail passes through the southern end of Ashburton. It connects to the Ashburton end of the Outer Circle Line, a bicycle and walking track that continues to Kew.

Ashburton has several community playgrounds:

- Alamein Avenue Playground
- Ashburton Park Playground (including an off-leash area for dogs)
- Ashburton Community Centre Playground
- Markham Avenue Reserve Playground
- Saxby Road Playground
- Warner Reserve Playground
- Watson Park Playground
- Winton Road Playground

The hall at Ashburton Park hosts the 1st Ashburton Scout Group.

== Notable residents ==
- Several former Ashy Redbacks players were recruited to the Australian Football League, including: Luke Ball, Jack Viney, Toby Greene, Tom Mitchell, Eliza McNamara, Jordan De Goey, and Jasmine Fleming
- Robert Allenby, professional golfer, grew up in Ashburton and attended Alamein State School
- Hazel Edwards, renowned children's literature writer and author of the classic There's a Hippopotamus on my Roof Eating Cake, attended Ashburton Primary School
- Damien Fleming, cricket commentator and former cricketer
- Mick Harvey, singer-songwriter for The Boys Next Door, The Birthday Party, and Nick Cave and the Bad Seeds lived in Ashburton when his father was the vicar at St Oswalds Anglican Church
- Vance Joy, singer-songwriter
- Andrew Knight, TV producer and writer of SeaChange, Rake and Jack Irish attended Ashburton Primary School
- Paul Little, businessman and philanthropist, attended Ashburton Primary School
- Garry Lyon, AFL footballer and commentator, lived in the area
- Peter Nevill, Australian cricketer, grew up in Ashburton
- Emeritus Prof. Alan Trounson, Australian embryologist with expertise in stem cell research
- Denis Vaughan, internationally renowned conductor, grew up in Ashburton
- Roberto Surace, West End and Broadway set and costume designer, grew up in Ashburton before moving to London, UK. He is best known for his work on the world wide hit play, The Play That Goes Wrong.

== See also ==
- City of Camberwell – Ashburton was previously within this former local government area.
