= Chadstone High School =

Location
- Chadstone, Victoria; Australia; 37°52′48″S 145°04′55″E

Information
- Type: Public
- Established: 1962
- Closed: 1990
- Years: 7–12
- Mascot: Phoenix
- Yearbook: The Phoenix

Chadstone High School (State School number 7710) was a former Victorian Government high school, located in the Melbourne suburb of Chadstone. Chadstone High School was often referred to as "Chaddy High".

== History ==
The school was established in 1962 in what was then a rapidly growing outer-suburban area. It initially operated out of demountable classrooms until a purpose-built three-storey school building was finished in the early 1960s. The RK Senior Hall (named after one of the school's principals) was constructed in the 1970s.

It was established adjacent to the Chadstone Park Primary School. The school also took students from other neighbouring primary schools including Solway Primary School, Lloyd Street, Murrumbeena and Hughesdale.

The demographics of the area changed from the 1960s through to the 1980s, with the area's population ageing. The school's population declined, and the school was closed in 1991.

== School Symbols and Uniform ==
Chadstone's symbol was the mythical Phoenix, a fabled bird that rose from the ashes of defeat. The Phoenix became the name of the annual school magazine.

The name Phoenix lives on through Phoenix Park, which is located on the school's site.

The school's motto was "Faith and Decision", as celebrated in the chorus of the school song...

"Let us resolve, like the phoenix to arise
From the ashes of our lesser selves and strive
Throughout our lives, with honour and with truth
In faith and decision wise" (composed by Haslam, Dombrain and Lamb.)

Boys wore long or short grey trousers with a white shirt and black shoes (or desert boots). Maroon blazer and ties were worn in the 1960s and early 1970s, but their use abated in the 1970s, and a grey jumper became the standard winter uniform. No school cap or hat was worn.

Girls wore a chequered dress in summer and a grey skirt, white shirt and grey jumper in winter.

At formal events, such as concerts by the school's band or orchestra, boys and girls wore maroon blazers with the school emblem on the breast pocket.

Sporting uniforms were variations of red and black, or sometimes red, black, and white. Typical was a red T-shirt and black shorts for athletics.

== Famous Ex-Students ==
Richmond Football Club player David Cloke attended Chadstone High School. David Broad played District Cricket for Melbourne "MCC". He also captained the club and opened the batting for Victoria, playing 13 matches with a batting Average of 34.94.

== Redevelopment ==
The school itself, apart from the RK Senior Hall, was demolished in the 1990s and the site redeveloped as Phoenix Park.
