= Postal district numbers of Melbourne =

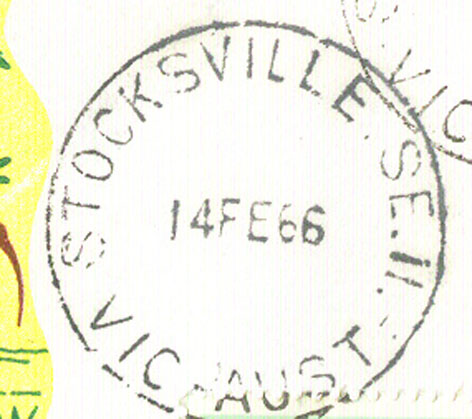
Postmark showing postal district number

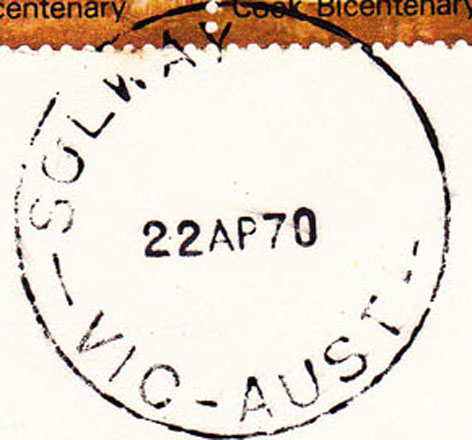
Postmark with postal district number filed off after postcode introduction

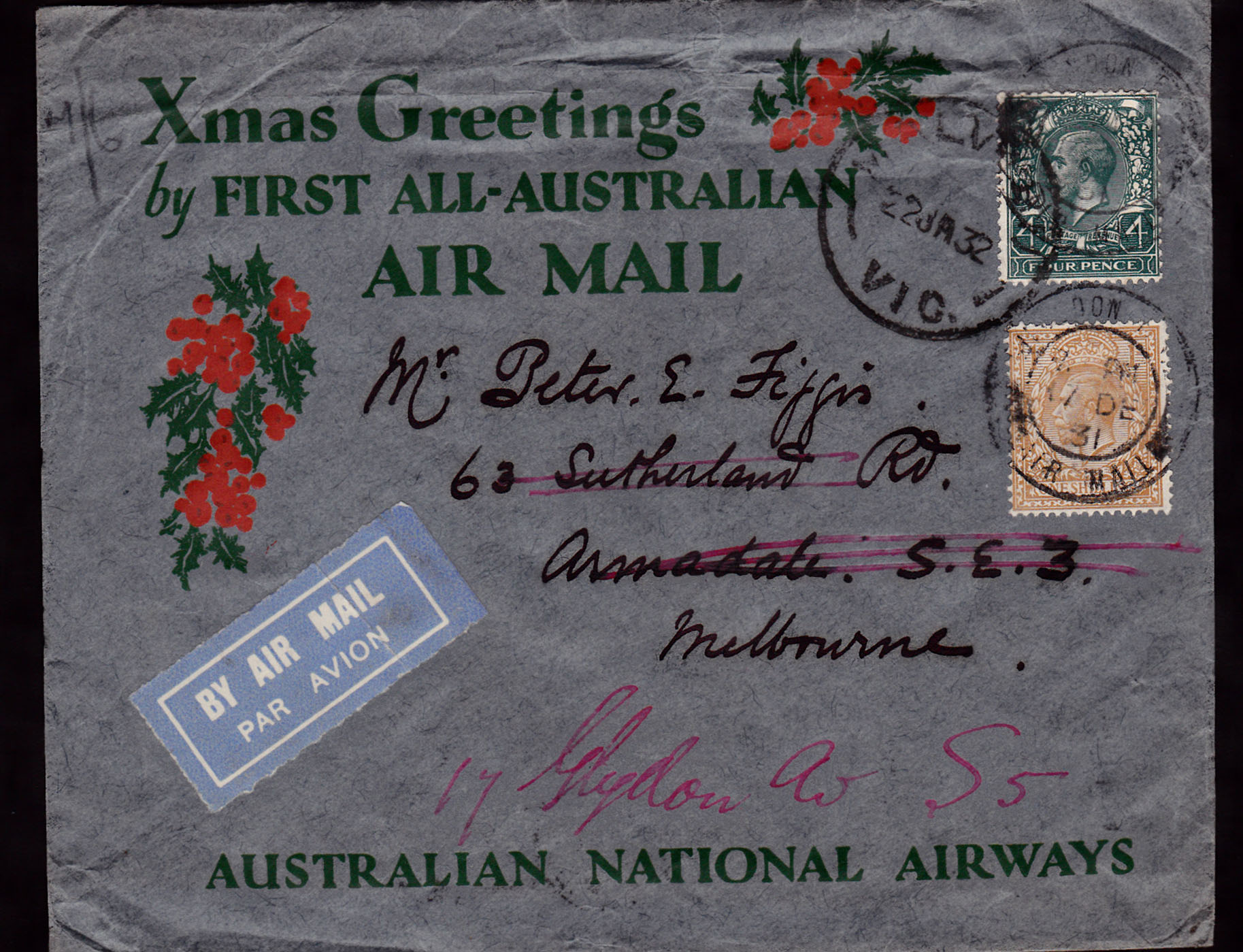
1931 PO redirection using postal district number only: S.5 Brighton

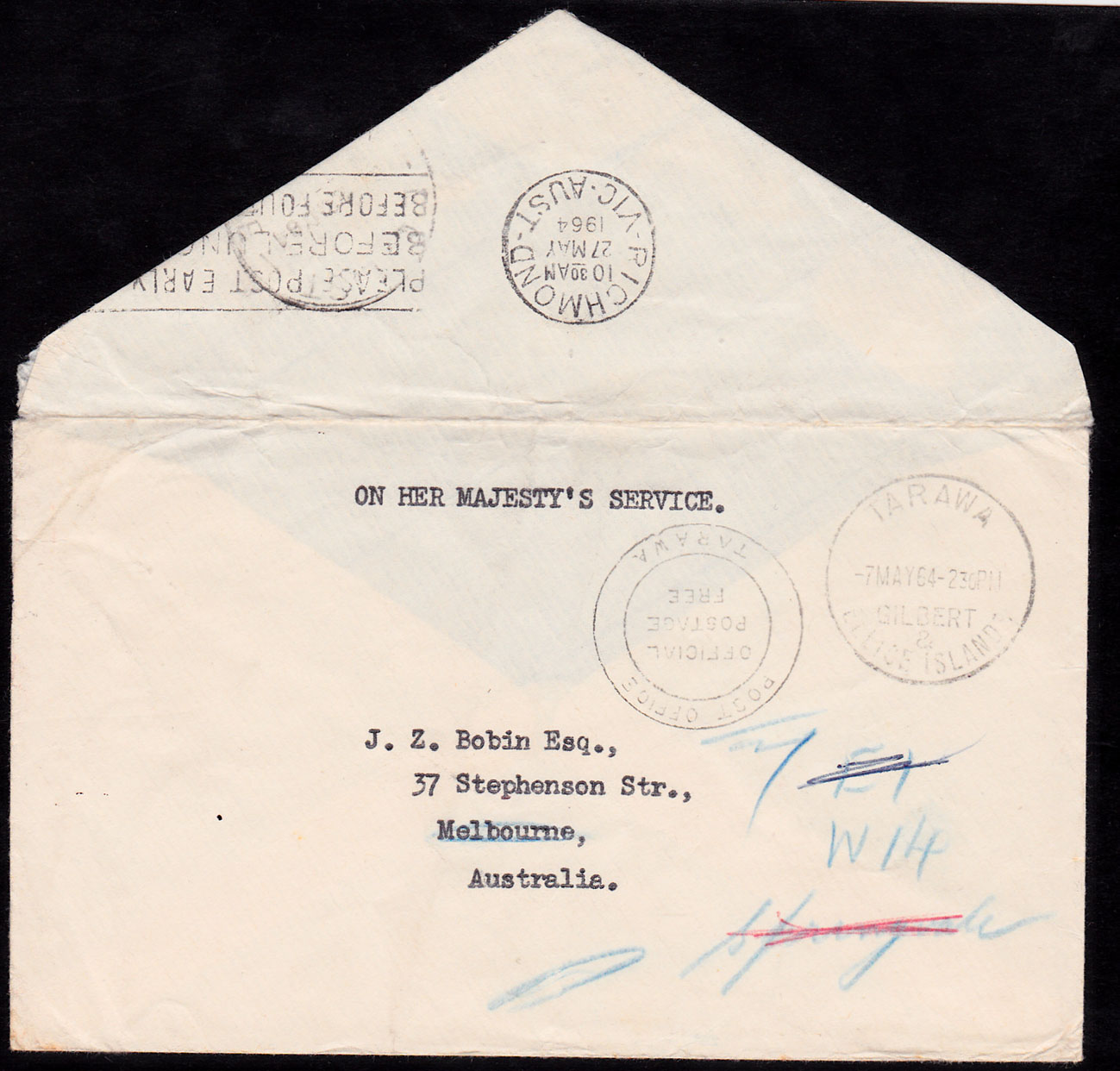
Insufficient address: marked to try E1 (Richmond), W14 (Spotswood) and Springvale (a suburb, but outside PDN area)- delivered to Spotswood

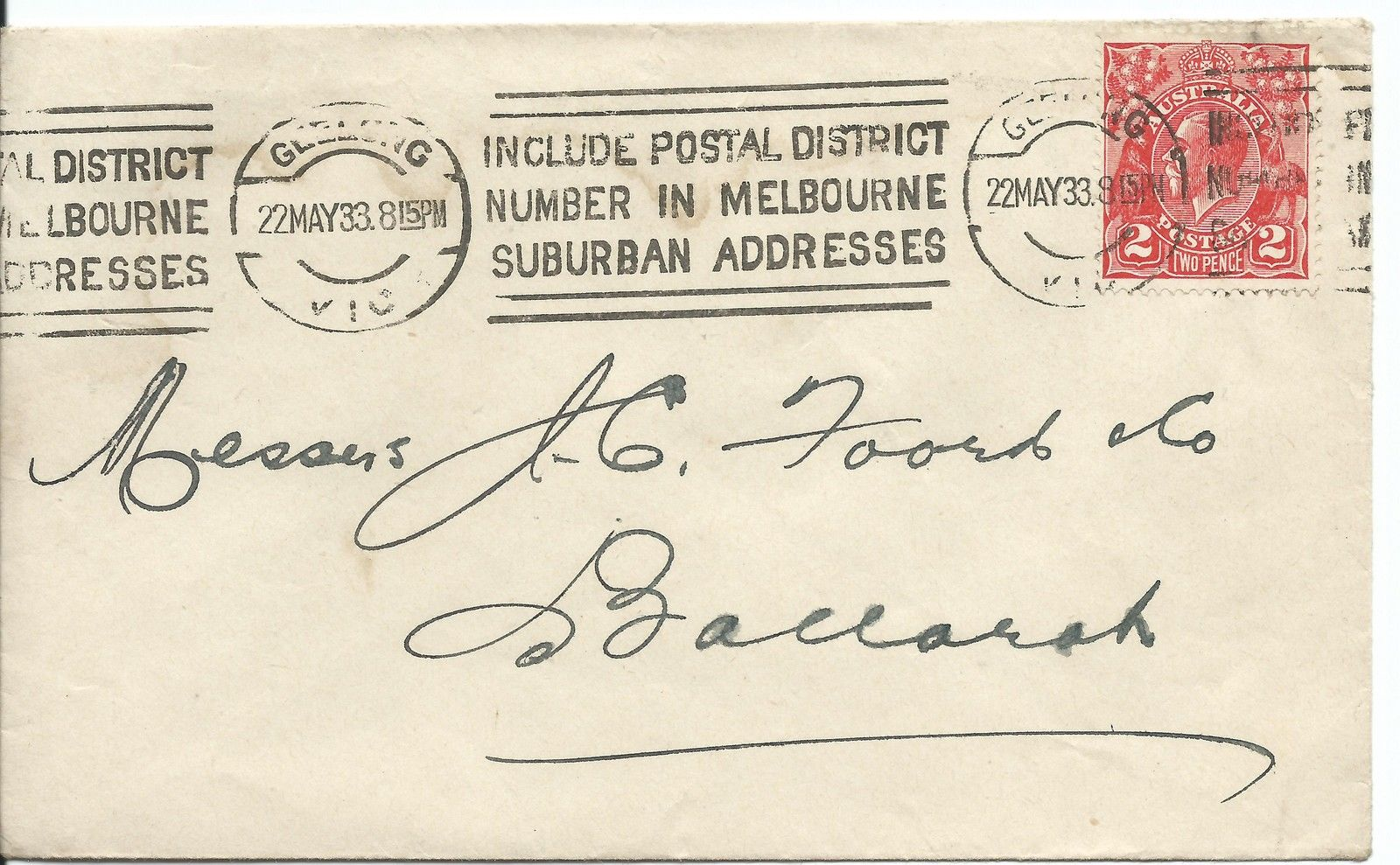

Postal district numbers for the addressing and sorting of mail were used in the suburban area of Melbourne, Victoria, Australia from February 1928 until their 1967 replacement by the Australia-wide postcodes. They were based on the London codes with a letter (or letters) denoting the direction from the main city post office and a number appended to, generally, correlate with the relative distance. An earlier system from around 1923 with twelve districts or 54 which had failed due to neglect was replaced.

Most postal districts were named from the post office from which delivery of mail was effected although a small number of districts contained no post offices. 99 districts were created and suburbs which were developed after 1928 were not allocated postal district numbers, the structure being retained substantially unchanged until 1967. The street directory issued in connection with the system allocated a postal district name and number to all streets in the metropolitan area.

The table below shows the district numbers used, the date being 1928 if a post office was open then or earlier. An asterisk identifies a name as a postal district.

| Post Office | PDN | Date | Suburb now | Notes |
|---|---|---|---|---|
| (Carnegie North) | SE.10 | | | * no Post Office |
| (Hawthorn East) | E. 3 | | | * no Post Office |
| (Williamstown West) | W.17 | | | * no Post Office |
| Abbotsford | N. 9 | 1928 | Abbotsford | ** name of district |
| Aerodrome Essendon | W. 6 | 1938 | Essendon | . |
| Albert Park | SC. 6 | 1928 | Albert Park | * |
| Albert Park South | SC. 6 | 1947 | Albert Park | . |
| Alphington | N.20 | 1928 | Alphington | . |
| Altona | W.18 | 1928 | Altona | * |
| Altona East | W.15 | 1960 | Altona North | . |
| Altona North | W.18 | 1960 | Altona North | . |
| Argyle Street | W.12 | 1937 | Footscray West | . |
| Armadale | SE. 3 | 1928 | Armadale | * |
| Armadale North | SE. 3 | 1940 | Armadale | . |
| Ascot Vale | W. 2 | 1928 | Ascot Vale | * |
| Ascot Vale East | W. 2 | 1928 | Ascot Vale | . |
| Ascot Vale RAAF | W. 2 | 1943 | Ascot Vale | . |
| Ascot Vale West | W. 2 | 1935 | Ascot Vale | . |
| Ashburton | SE.11 | 1928 | Ashburton | * Ashburton South |
| Ashburton East | SE.11 | 1949 | Ashburton | . |
| Ashwood | SE.11 | 1951 | Ashwood | . |
| Aspendale | S.13 | 1928 | Aspendale | * |
| Auburn | E. 2 | 1928 | Hawthorn East | . |
| Auburn South | E. 2 | 1928 | Hawthorn | . |
| Balaclava | S.16 | 1928 | Balaclava | . |
| Balwyn | E. 8 | 1928 | Balwyn | * |
| Balwyn East | E. 8 | 1951 | Balwyn | . |
| Balwyn North | E. 9 | 1937 | Balwyn North | * |
| Balwyn West | E. 4 | 1928 | | . |
| Barker | E. 2 | 1952 | Hawthorn | . |
| Batman | N.13 | 1934 | Coburg North | . |
| Beaumaris | S.10 | 1928 | Beaumaris | * |
| Beaumaris South | S.10 | 1957 | Beaumaris | . |
| Beevers | W.21 | 1966 | Altona North | . |
| Bentleigh | SE.14 | 1928 | Bentleigh | * |
| Bentleigh Central | SE.15 | 1928 | | . |
| Bentleigh East | SE.15 | 1928 | Bentleigh East | * |
| Bentleigh North | SE.14 | 1949 | McKinnon | . to Mckinnon 1964 |
| Black Rock | S. 9 | 1928 | Black Rock | * |
| Black Rock North | S. 9 | 1936 | Black Rock | . |
| Booran Road | SE. 9 | 1934 | Glen Huntly | . |
| Bourke Street East | C. 1 | 1928 | Melbourne | . |
| Box Hill | E.11 | 1928 | Box Hill | * |
| Box Hill North | E.12 | 1955 | Box Hill North | * |
| Box Hill South | E.11 | 1928 | Box Hill South | . |
| Braybrook | W.19 | 1928 | Braybrook | * |
| Braybrook North | W.19 | 1960 | Braybrook | . |
| Brighton | S. 5 | 1928 | Brighton | * |
| Brighton Beach | S. 5 | 1928 | Brighton | . |
| Brighton East | S. 6 | 1935 | Brighton East | * |
| Brighton Road | S. 3 | 1938 | Elwood | . |
| Brighton West | S. 5 | 1928 | Brighton | . |
| Brunswick | N.10 | 1928 | Brunswick | * |
| Brunswick East | N.11 | 1928 | Brunswick East | * |
| Brunswick North | N.10 | 1949 | Brunswick | . |
| Brunswick South | N.12 | 1929 | Brunswick West | . |
| Brunswick West | N.12 | 1928 | Brunswick West | * |
| Burke Road | E. 9 | 1941 | | . |
| Burnley | E. 1 | 1928 | Burnley | . |
| Burnley North | E. 1 | 1938 | Burnley | . |
| Burwood | E.13 | 1928 | Burwood | * |
| Burwood East | E.13 | 1928 | Burwood East | . |
| Burwood West | E.13 | 1938 | Burwood | . |
| Camberwell | E. 6 | 1928 | Camberwell | * |
| Camberwell East | E. 7 | 1928 | | . |
| Camberwell North | E. 6 | 1928 | Camberwell | . |
| Camberwell South | E. 6 | 1928 | Camberwell | . |
| Camp Pell | N. 2 | 1943 | | . |
| Canterbury | E. 7 | 1928 | Canterbury | * |
| Carlton | N. 3 | 1928 | Carlton | * |
| Carlton North | N. 4 | 1928 | Carlton North | * |
| Carlton South | N. 3 | 1928 | Carlton | . |
| Carnegie | SE. 9 | 1928 | Carnegie | * |
| Carnegie South | SE. 9 | 1947 | Carnegie | . |
| Castlefield | S. 7 | 1950 | Hampton | . |
| Caulfield | SE. 8 | 1928 | Caulfield | * |
| Caulfield East | SE. 5 | 1929 | Caulfield East | . |
| Caulfield Junction | SE. 7 | 1928 | Caulfield North | . |
| Caulfield Military | SE. 7 | 1940 | | . |
| Caulfield Military Hospital | SE. 8 | 1933 | | . |
| Caulfield South | SE. 8 | 1928 | Caulfield South | . |
| Caulfield North | SE. 7 | 1928 | Caulfield North | * |
| Central Park | SE. 5 | 1928 | | . |
| Chadstone | SE.10 | 1957 | Chadstone | . |
| Chadstone Centre | SE.10 | 1960 | Chadstone | . |
| Charman | S.11 | 1954 | Mentone | . |
| Chelsea | S.15 | 1928 | Chelsea | * |
| Cheltenham | S.22 | 1928 | Cheltenham | * |
| Cheltenham East | S.22 | 1961 | Cheltenham | . |
| Cheltenham North | S.22 | 1961 | Cheltenham | . |
| City Road | SC. 4/SC. 5 | 1928 | South Melbourne | . |
| Clifton Hill | N. 8 | 1928 | Clifton Hill | * |
| Clifton Hill East | N. 8 | 1934 | | . |
| Coatesville | SE.15 | 1955 | Bentleigh East | . |
| Coburg | N.13 | 1928 | Coburg | * |
| Coburg East | N.13 | 1929 | Coburg | . |
| Coburg North | N.14 | 1957 | Coburg North | * |
| Coburg West | N.13 | 1936 | Coburg | . |
| Collingwood | N. 5 | 1928 | Collingwood | * |
| Collingwood North | N. 5 | 1948 | Collingwood | . |
| Collins Street | C. 1 | 1928 | Melbourne | . |
| Coonans Hill | W. 7 | 1957 | Pascoe Vale South | . |
| Cotham | E. 4 | 1938 | Kew | . |
| Cromer | S.10 | 1954 | Beaumaris | . |
| Cross Keys | W. 5 | 1929 | Essendon | . |
| Croxton | N.16 | 1928 | Northcote | . |
| Dandenong Road | S. 1 | 1938 | | . |
| Darebin | N.21 | 1929 | Ivanhoe | . |
| Darling | SE. 5 | 1928 | Malvern East | . |
| Darling South | SE. 5 | 1928 | Malvern East | . |
| Deepdene | E. 8 | 1928 | Deepdene | . |
| Degraves Street | C. 1 | 1956 | Melbourne | . |
| Dendy | S. 5 | 1947 | Brighton | . |
| Dennis | N.16 | 1928 | Northcote | . |
| Domain Road | SE. 1 | 1936 | | . |
| Doutta Galla | | 1957 | | . |
| Draytonville | | 1952 | | . |
| Eaglemont | N.22 | 1929 | Eaglemont | . |
| East Melbourne | C. 2 | 1928 | East Melbourne | * |
| Edithvale | S.14 | 1928 | Edithvale | * |
| Elgar Park | E.10 | 1929 | Surrey Hills | . |
| Elizabeth Street | C. 1 | 1928 | Melbourne | . |
| Elsternwick | S. 4 | 1928 | Elsternwick | * |
| Elsternwick East | S. 4 | 1929 | Elsternwick | . |
| Elsternwick North | S. 4 | 1934 | Elsternwick | . |
| Elwood | S. 3 | 1928 | Elwood | * |
| Elwood East | S. 3 | 1935 | Elwood | . |
| Elwood North | S. 3 | 1938 | Elwood | . |
| Essendon | W. 5 | 1928 | Essendon | * |
| Essendon Airport | W. 6 | 1949 | | . |
| Essendon West | W. 5 | 1928 | Essendon West | . |
| Exhibition R.A.A.F | N. 3 | 1941 | | . |
| Exhibition Street | C. 1 | 1959 | Melbourne | . |
| Fairfield | N.20 | 1928 | Fairfield | * |
| Faversham | E.10 | 1957 | Surrey Hills | . |
| Fawkner | N.15 | 1928 | Fawkner | * |
| Fawkner North | | 1961 | Fawkner | . |
| Fawkner South | N.15 | 1960 | Fawkner | . |
| Fawkner West | W. 9 | 1962 | | . |
| Fitzroy | N. 6 | 1928 | Fitzroy | * |
| Fitzroy Central | N. 7 | 1948 | | . |
| Fitzroy North | N. 7 | 1928 | Fitzroy North | * |
| Fitzroy South | N. 6 | 1936 | Fitzroy | . |
| Flemington | W. 1 | 1928 | Flemington | * |
| Flinders Street | C. 1 | 1929 | Melbourne | . |
| Footscray | W.11 | 1928 | Footscray | * |
| Footscray North | W.11 | 1928 | Footscray | . |
| Footscray Park | W.11 | 1951 | Footscray | . |
| Footscray West | W.12 | 1928 | West Footscray | * |
| Fortuna | E. 9 | 1957 | Balwyn North | . |
| Garden City | SC. 8 | 1945 | Port Melbourne | . |
| Gardenvale | S. 4 | 1928 | Gardenvale | . |
| Gardenvale West | S. 4 | 1928 | Gardenvale | . |
| Gardiner | SE. 6 | 1928 | Glen Iris | . |
| Geelong Road, Footscray | W.12 | 1936 | | . |
| Gilberton | N.18 | 1928 | Preston | . |
| Glen Iris | SE. 6 | 1928 | Glen Iris | * |
| Glen Iris Upper | | 1947 | | . |
| Glenbervie | W. 5 | 1938 | Essendon | . |
| Glenferrie | E. 2 | 1928 | Hawthorn | . |
| Glenferrie South | E. 2 | 1929 | Hawthorn | . |
| Glengala | W.20 | 1957 | Sunshine West | . |
| Glenhuntly | SE. 9 | 1928 | Glen Huntly | . |
| Glenroy | W. 9 | 1928 | Glenroy | * |
| Glenroy East | W. 9 | 1958 | Glenroy | . |
| Greythorn | E. 9 | 1951 | Balwyn North | . |
| Hadfield | W. 9 | 1957 | Hadfield | . |
| Half Moon Bay | S. 9 | 1928 | Black Rock | . |
| Hampton | S. 7 | 1928 | Hampton | * |
| Hampton East | S. 7 | 1947 | Hampton East | . |
| Hampton North | S. 7 | 1957 | Hampton | . |
| Hartwell | E. 6/E. 13 | 1928 | Camberwell | . |
| Hawksburn | S. 1/SE. 2 | 1928 | South Yarra | . |
| Hawthorn | E. 2 | 1928 | Hawthorn | * |
| Hawthorn North | E. 2 | 1928 | Hawthorn | . |
| Hawthorn South | E. 6 | 1928 | Hawthorn East | . |
| Hawthorn West | E. 2 | 1928 | Hawthorn | . |
| Heidelberg | N.22 | 1928 | Heidelberg | * |
| Heidelberg Heights | N.23 | 1950 | Heidelberg Heights | . |
| Heidelberg Military Hospital | N.22 | 1941 | Heidelberg | . |
| Heidelberg North | N.23 | 1958 | Heidelberg Heights | . |
| Heidelberg West | N.23 | 1952 | Heidelberg West | * |
| Highett | S.21 | 1928 | Highett | * |
| Hopetoun Gardens | S. 4 | 1951 | Caulfield South | . |
| Hotham Hill | N. 1 | 1928 | North Melbourne | . |
| Houston | E.11 | 1961 | Box Hill South | . |
| Hughesdale | SE.12 | 1928 | Hughesdale | . |
| Huntingdale | SE.12 | 1955 | Huntingdale | . |
| Ivanhoe | N.21 | 1928 | Ivanhoe | * |
| Ivanhoe East | N.21 | 1939 | Ivanhoe East | . |
| Ivanhoe North | N.21 | 1928 | Ivanhoe | . |
| Ivanhoe West | | 1955 | Ivanhoe | . |
| Kensington | W. 1 | 1928 | Kensington | . |
| Kerrimuir | E.12 | 1955 | Box Hill North | . |
| Kew | E. 4 | 1928 | Kew | * |
| Kew East | E. 5 | 1928 | Kew East | . |
| Kew North | E. 5 | 1936 | Kew East | * |
| King Street | C. 1 | 1965 | Melbourne | . |
| Kingsville | W.12 | 1928 | Kingsville | . |
| Kingsville South | W.14 | 1948 | South Kingsville | * |
| Kingsville West | W.13 | 1964 | | . |
| Kooyong | SE. 4 | 1928 | Kooyong | . |
| Kooyong Road | SE. 7 | 1938 | | to Crimea 1946 |
| Law Courts | C. 1 | 1928 | Melbourne | . |
| Lonsdale Street | C. 1 | 1929 | Melbourne | . |
| Maidstone | W.19 | 1928 | Maidstone | . |
| Maidstone North | W.10 | 1950 | Maidstone | . |
| Malvern | SE. 4 | 1928 | Malvern | * |
| Malvern East | SE. 5 | 1935 | Malvern East | * |
| Malvern North | SE. 4 | 1928 | Malvern | . |
| Malvern South | SE. 4 | 1948 | Malvern | . |
| Manchester Road | SE.14 | 1928 | McKinnon | . to Bentleigh North 1949 |
| Maribyrnong | W. 3 | 1928 | | * |
| Market Street | C. 1 | 1928 | Melbourne | . |
| McKinnon | SE.14 | 1964 | McKinnon | . |
| Melbourne (GPO) | C. 1 | 1928 | Melbourne | * |
| Melbourne Airport | W. 6 | 1956 | | . |
| Melbourne University | N. 3 | 1928 | Parkville | . |
| Mentone | S.11 | 1928 | Mentone | * |
| Mentone East | S.11 | 1959 | Mentone | . |
| Mentone South | S.11 | 1928 | | . |
| Merlynston | N.14 | 1928 | Coburg North | . |
| Merri | N. 7 | 1948 | Northcote | . |
| Middle Brighton Pier | S. 5 | 1934 | | . |
| Middle Camberwell | E. 6 | 1928 | Camberwell | . |
| Middle Footscray | | 1937 | | . |
| Middle Park | SC. 6 | 1928 | Middle Park | . |
| Middle Park West | SC. 6 | 1937 | Middle Park | . |
| Mont Albert | E.10 | 1928 | Mont Albert | . |
| Mont Albert North | E.12 | 1957 | Box Hill North | . |
| Montague | SC. 5 | 1928 | South Melbourne | . |
| Moonee Ponds | W. 4 | 1928 | Moonee Ponds | * |
| Moonee Ponds East | W. 4 | 1937 | Moonee Ponds | . |
| Moonee Ponds North | W. 4 | 1936 | Moonee Ponds | . |
| Moonee Ponds West | W. 4 | 1935 | | . |
| Moonee Vale | N.12 | 1928 | Brunswick West | . |
| Moorabbin | S.20 | 1928 | Moorabbin | * |
| Moorabbin East | | 1960 | Moorabbin | . |
| Moorleigh | SE.13 | 1954 | Oakleigh South | . |
| Mordialloc | S.12 | 1928 | Mordialloc | * |
| Mordialloc North | S.12 | 1956 | Mordialloc | . |
| Moreland | N.13 | 1928 | Coburg | . |
| Moreland East | N.11 | 1928 | Brunswick East | . |
| Moreland West | N.12 | 1928 | Brunswick West | . |
| Murrumbeena | SE. 9 | 1928 | Murrumbeena | . |
| Newlands Estate | N.14 | 1949 | Coburg North | . |
| North Road, Brighton | S. 6 | 1930 | Brighton East | . |
| Northcote | N.16 | 1928 | Northcote | * |
| Northcote Central | N.16 | 1928 | Northcote | . |
| Northcote North | N.16 | 1935 | Northcote | . |
| Northcote South | N.16 | 1945 | Northcote | . |
| North Melbourne | N. 1 | 1928 | North Melbourne | * |
| North Essendon | W. 5/W. 6 | 1928 | | * |
| North Brighton | S. 5 | 1928 | | . |
| Niddrie | W. 6 | 1928 | Niddrie | . |
| Nicholson Street North | N.11 | 1929 | | . |
| Newport | W.15 | 1928 | Newport | * |
| Newport West | W.15 | 1928 | Newport | . |
| Oak Park | W. 8/W. 9 | 1957 | Oak Park | . |
| Oakleigh | SE.12 | 1928 | Oakleigh | * |
| Oakleigh East | SE.12 | 1928 | Oakleigh East | . |
| Oakleigh North | SE.12 | 1928 | Oakleigh | . |
| Oakleigh South | SE.12/SE.13 | 1936 | Oakleigh South | * |
| Ormond | SE.14 | 1928 | Ormond | . |
| Ormond East | SE.14 | 1951 | Ormond | . |
| Parkdale | S.11 | 1928 | Parkdale | . |
| Parkville | N. 2 | 1928 | Parkville | * |
| Pascoe Vale | W. 8 | 1928 | Pascoe Vale | * |
| Pascoe Vale South | W. 7 | 1928 | Pascoe Vale South | * |
| Pascoe Vale West | W. 8 | 1928 | Pascoe Vale | . |
| Patterson | S.20 | 1948 | Bentleigh | . |
| Patterson West | S.20 | 1961 | Bentleigh | . |
| Pender | N.18 | 1963 | Thornbury | . |
| Pennydale | S.22 | 1958 | Cheltenham | . |
| Port Melbourne | SC. 7 | 1928 | Port Melbourne | * |
| Port Melbourne West | SC. 7 | 1928 | Port Melbourne | * |
| Prahran | S. 1 | 1928 | Prahran | * |
| Prahran East | S. 1 | 1928 | Prahran | . |
| Preston | N.18 | 1928 | Preston | * |
| Preston East | N.19 | 1928 | | . |
| Preston South | N.18 | 1928 | Preston | . |
| Preston West | N.18 | 1928 | Preston | . |
| Public Offices | C. 2 | 1928 | | . |
| Regent | N.18/N.19 | 1928 | Preston | . |
| Regent West | N.18 | 1947 | Preston | . |
| Reservoir | N.19 | 1928 | Reservoir | * |
| Reservoir East | N.19 | 1959 | Reservoir | . |
| Reservoir North | | 1965 | Reservoir | . |
| Rialto | C. 1 | 1928 | Melbourne | . |
| Richmond | E. 1 | 1928 | Richmond | * |
| Richmond East | E. 1 | 1928 | Cremorne | . |
| Richmond North | E. 1 | 1928 | Richmond | . |
| Richmond South | E. 1 | 1928 | Richmond | . |
| Ripponlea | S. 2 | 1928 | Ripponlea | . |
| Robinson | W.19 | 1955 | Braybrook | . |
| Rosanna | N.22 | 1928 | Rosanna | . |
| Rosanna East | N.22 | 1960 | Viewbank | . |
| Royal Park Mil. P.O. | N. 2 | 1940 | Parkville | . |
| Russell Street | C. 1 | 1928 | Melbourne | . |
| Sandringham | S. 8 | 1928 | Sandringham | * |
| Seaholme | W.18 | 1951 | Seaholme | . |
| Seddon | W.11 | 1935 | Seddon | . |
| Seddon West | W.11 | 1928 | Seddon | . |
| Sinclair | | 1959 | East Melbourne | . |
| Solway | SE.11 | 1954 | Ashburton | . |
| South Melbourne | SC. 5 | 1928 | South Melbourne | * |
| South Yarra | SE. 1 | 1928 | South Yarra | * |
| Spencer Street | C. 1 | 1928 | Melbourne | . |
| Spotswood | W.15 | 1928 | Spotswood | * |
| St George's Road, Thornbury | N.17 | 1936 | Thornbury | . |
| St Kilda | S. 2 | 1928 | St Kilda | * |
| St Kilda Junction | S. 2 | 1936 | St Kilda West | . |
| St Kilda Road | SC. 2 | 1938 | Melbourne | . |
| St Kilda Road Central | SC. 2 | 1960 | Melbourne | * |
| (St Kilda Road North) | SC. 1 | | | * no Post Office |
| (St Kilda Road South) | SC. 3 | | | * no Post Office |
| St Kilda South | S. 2 | 1928 | St Kilda | . |
| St Kilda Railway Station | S. 2 | 1928 | St Kilda | . |
| State Parliament | C. 1 | 1928 | Melbourne | . |
| Stock Exchange | C. 1 | 1928 | Melbourne | . |
| Stocksville | SE.11 | 1955 | Ashwood | . |
| Stradbroke Park | E. 5 | 1951 | Balwyn | . |
| Strathmore | W. 6 | 1953 | Strathmore | . |
| Sturt Street | SC. 4 | 1938 | Southbank | * City South |
| Sumner | N.11 | 1947 | Brunswick East | . |
| Sunshine | W.20 | 1928 | Sunshine | * |
| Sunshine North | W.20 | 1958 | Sunshine North | . |
| Sunshine West | W.20 | 1939 | Sunshine West | . |
| Surrey Hills | E.10 | 1928 | Surrey Hills | * |
| Surrey Hills North | E.10 | 1928 | Surrey Hills | . |
| Surrey Hills South | E.10 | 1928 | Surrey Hills | . |
| Sylvester | N.18 | 1950 | Preston | . |
| Thornbury | N.17 | 1928 | Thornbury | * |
| Thornbury East | N.17 | 1938 | Thornbury | . |
| Thornbury North | N.17 | 1936 | Thornbury | . |
| Thornbury West | N.17 | 1928 | | . |
| Toorak | SE. 2 | 1928 | Toorak | * |
| Toorak Road | E. 6 | 1938 | | . |
| Tooronga | SE. 6 | 1928 | Malvern | . |
| Tottenham Central | W.19 | 1947 | Tottenham | . |
| Tottenham East | W.12 | 1935 | | . |
| Victoria Dock | C. 3 | 1934 | Docklands | . |
| Victoria Market | C. 1 | 1928 | Melbourne | . |
| Wattle Park | E.11 | 1960 | Burwood | . |
| Wattletree Road | SE. 5 | 1928 | Malvern East | . |
| Were Street, Brighton | S. 5 | 1928 | Brighton | . |
| West Melbourne | C. 3 | 1937 | West Melbourne | * |
| Westbreen | W. 8 | 1954 | Glenroy | . |
| Williamstown | W.16 | 1928 | Williamstown | * |
| Williamstown Beach | W.16 | 1946 | Williamstown | . |
| Williamstown Central | W.16 | 1945 | Williamstown | . |
| Williamstown North | W.16 | 1928 | Williamstown North | . |
| Willsmere | E. 5 | 1955 | Kew | . |
| Windsor | S. 1 | 1928 | Windsor | . |
| Wishart | S.20 | 1955 | Moorabbin | . |
| Yarraville | W.13 | 1928 | Yarraville | * |
| Yarraville West | W.13 | 1942 | Yarraville | . |
| Yooralla | E. 8 | 1954 | Balwyn North | . |

== See also ==
- List of Melbourne suburbs
