= St Michael's Parish School =

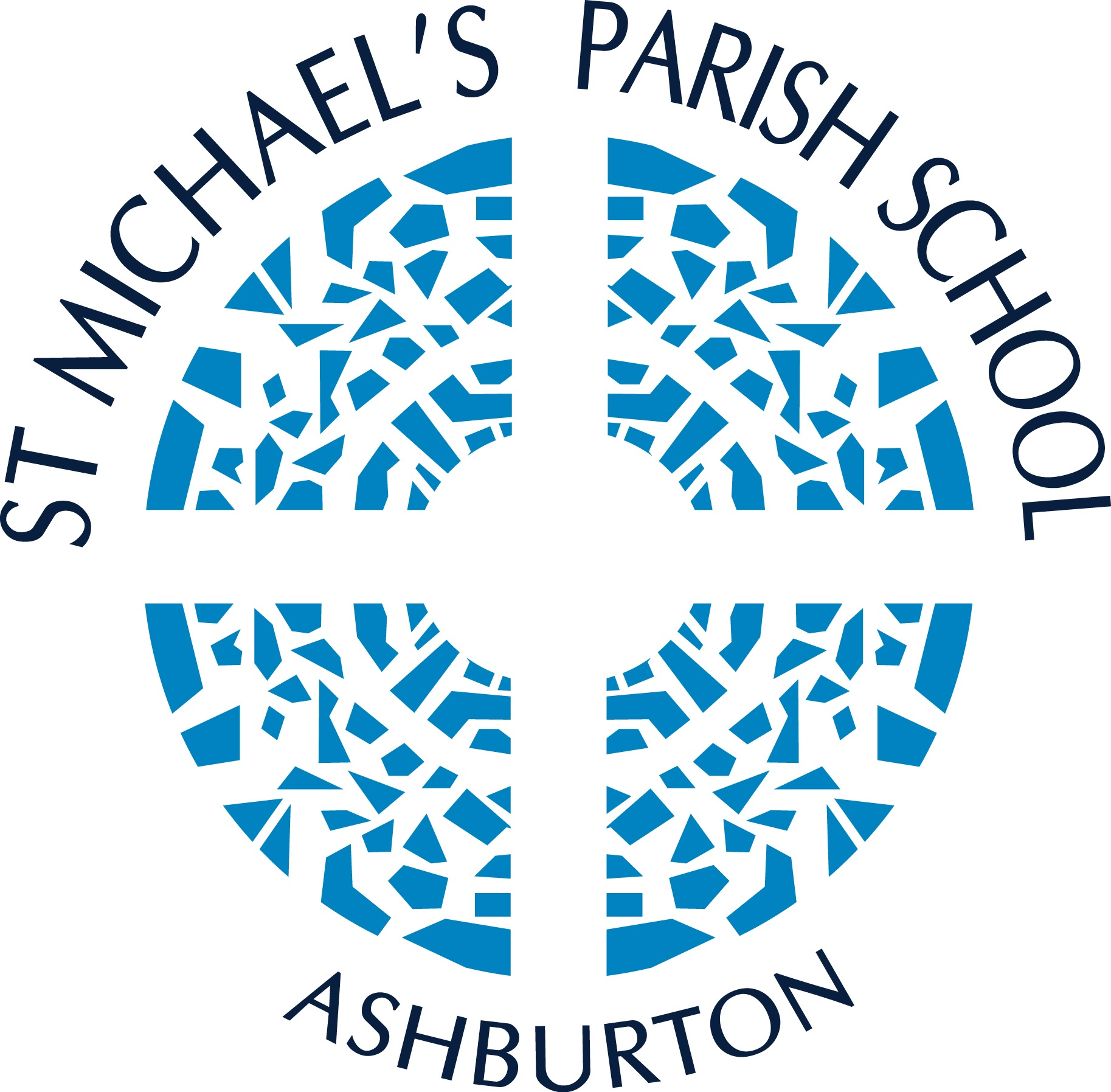
- 268 High Street, Ashburton, Victoria; Australia

Information
- Type: Co-educational, primary, day school
- Motto: A safe community of animated learners enlightened by faith in God.
- Denomination: Roman Catholic
- Established: 1946
- Principal: Annie Herbison
- Years taught: P–6
- Colours: Dark blue and light blue
- Website: www.smashburton.catholic.edu.au

St Michael's Parish School (aka St Michael's Primary School) is a Catholic co-ed primary school located in Ashburton, Victoria Australia. It comprises classes from Prep to Year 6 and has 25 staff members.

The patron saint of the school (and parish) is St Michael the Archangel.

The school's motto 'Quis Ut Deus' is St Michael's Latin name which means 'Who is like God'.

== History ==
St Michael's School was opened in 1946. The school shared the same building with the church and on Sundays, the classroom was packed away for masses. Sheila Evans was the sole teacher and the school commenced with a total student population of only 23.

Between the years 1948-49 an additional building was erected and the Presentation Sisters assumed responsibility for running the school.

In a review of the parish conducted in June 1969, it was documented that 385 students were attending the school.

In 1978, the Community Centre (or Hall) was completed as a resource for both the parish and the school.

Recently, they have finished constructing a hall, music room, art room and theatre.

== Curriculum ==
St Michael’s follows the structure of the Victorian school curriculum as outlined in the Victorian Curriculum and Assessment Authority.

Specialist lessons offered include: Library, LOTE (Mandarin), Visual Arts, Music, STEM and Physical Education.

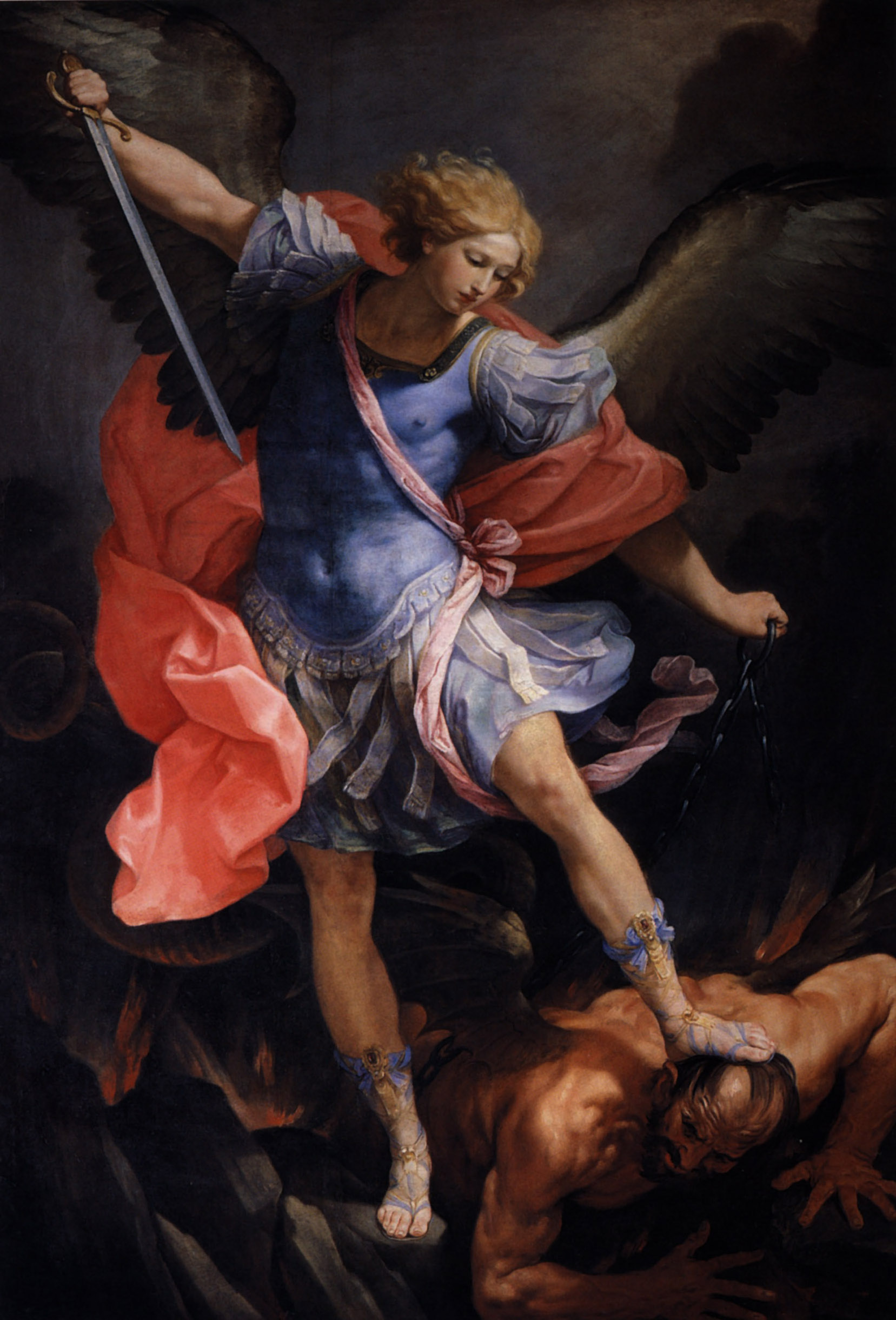
Archangel Michael is the patron saint of the school.
