= Chadstone =

- Suburb
- Interactive map of Chadstone
- Coordinates: 37.883°S 145.093°E
- Country: Australia
- State: Victoria
- City: Melbourne
- LGA: City of Monash
- Location: 14 km (8.7 mi) from Melbourne

Government
  - State electorates: Ashwood; Oakleigh
  - Federal divisions: Chisholm; Hotham

Area
  - Total: 3.1 km^{2} (1.2 sq mi)

Population
  - Total: 9,552 (2021 census)
  - Density: 3,080/km^{2} (7,980/sq mi)
- Postcode: 3148
Suburbs around Chadstone
Ashburton	Ashwood	Mount Waverley
Malvern East	Chadstone
Hughesdale	Oakleigh	Oakleigh East

Chadstone is a suburb in Melbourne, Victoria, Australia, 14 km (8.7 mi) south-east of Melbourne's Central Business District, located within the City of Monash local government area. Chadstone recorded a population of 9,552 at the 2021 census.

Landmarks include the Waverley Basketball Centre, Jordanville Community Centre and the Matthew Flinders Hotel. Scotchmans Creek runs along Chadstone's southern boundary, the Glen Waverley railway line along the northern boundary, Warrigal Road to the west and Huntingdale Road to the east. The Monash Freeway runs through the suburb.

== History ==
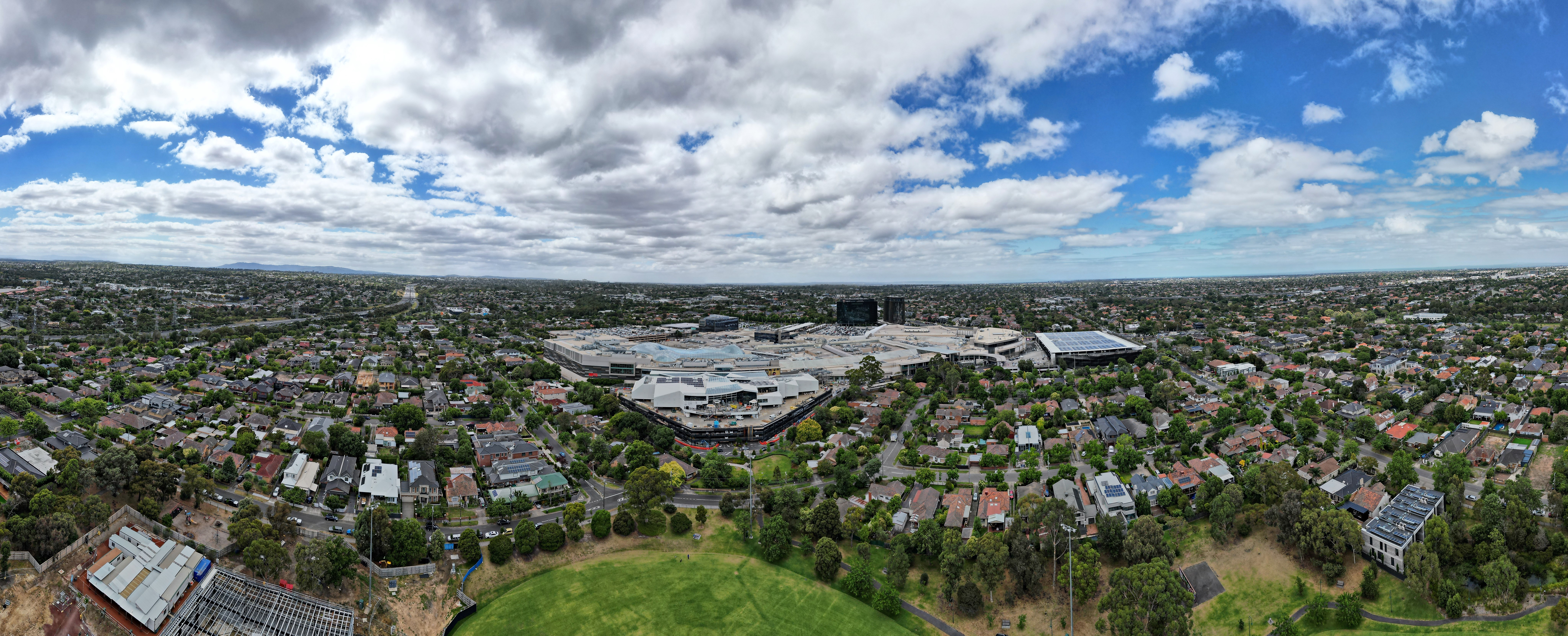
Aerial panorama of Chadstone Shopping Centre with the Dandenong Ranges on the horizon

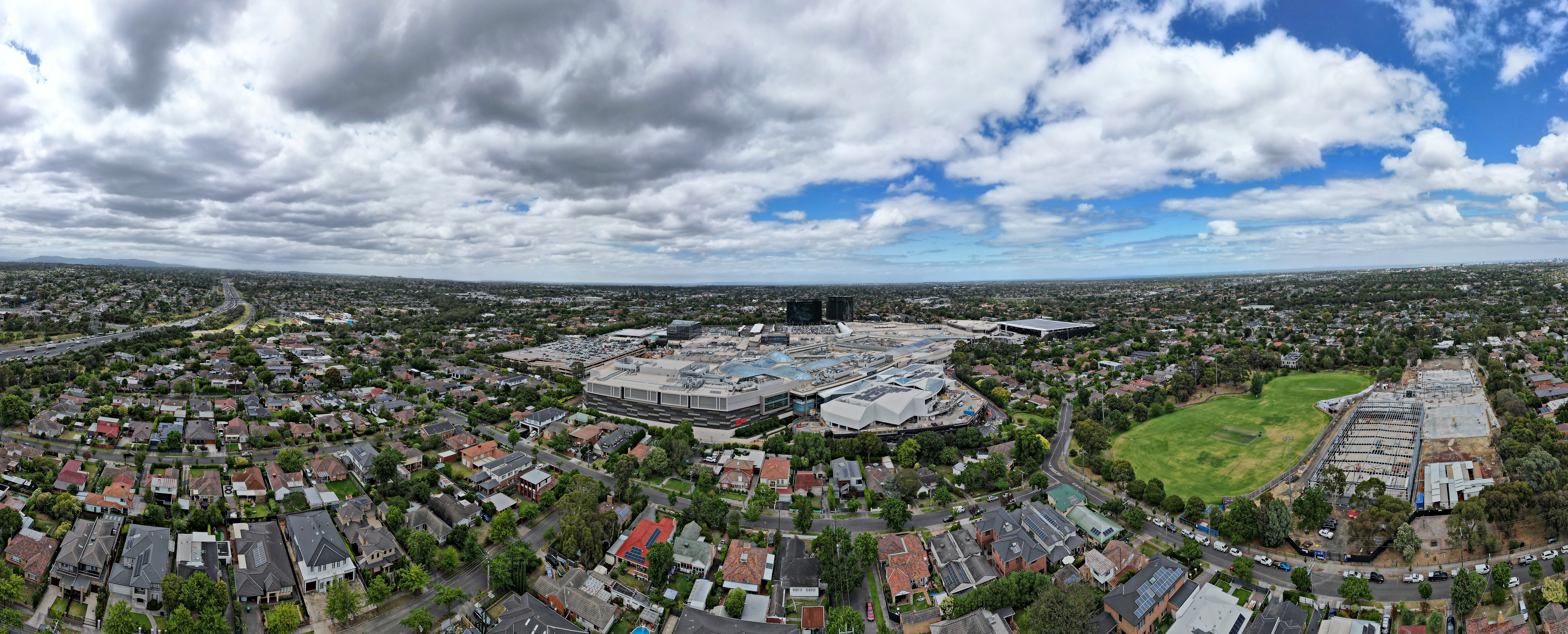
Aerial panorama of Chadstone Shopping Centre and its surrounds

Many of the houses in the Chadstone area were built in the postwar period using prefabricated concrete produced at the current site of Holmesglen Institute. The houses tend to be quite small, with two to three bedrooms and large blocks. It is relatively common for houses to be demolished and larger houses built to take advantage of the block size.

Chadstone Post Office opened on 8 April 1957 and Chadstone Centre Post Office opened on 3 October 1960. The Chadstone office closed in 1998.

Chadstone was home to Jordanville South Primary School on Baradine Street, which closed down at the end of the school year in 1993. It was also home to Chadstone High School (now closed), and Waverley High School (originally named Holmesglen High School, then renamed Jordanville High School and finally Waverley High School, not to be confused with Mount Waverley High School, located in Mount Waverley) which closed down in 1996. Chadstone's "Christ Campus" of the Australian Catholic University closed down in the early 2000s, its land being bought by Chadstone Shopping Centre to expand.

== Today ==
Chadstone is a small suburb, with parts previously known as Chadstone being rezoned to be incorporated into Malvern East. Several landmarks such as Chadstone Shopping Centre and the Chadstone campus of Holmesglen Institute of TAFE have retained their original names despite now being technically located in Malvern East. The current Chadstone locality incorporates an area formerly known as Jordanville (even though Jordanville Station is technically in Mount Waverley).

There are two schools in Chadstone, both of which are Roman Catholic Independent schools. They are Salesian College and St Mary Magdalen's Primary School.

== Population ==
In the 2016 Census, there were 8,641 people in Chadstone. 46.3% of people were born in Australia. The most common countries of birth were China 11.2%, India 4.5%, Sri Lanka 3.1%, Greece 2.8% and Malaysia 2.1%. 43.7% of people only spoke English at home. Other languages spoken at home included Mandarin 12.4%, Greek 7.2%, Cantonese 3.4%, Italian 2.8% and Sinhalese 2.4%. The most common responses for religion were No Religion 32.7% and Catholic 20.0%.

== See also ==
- City of Oakleigh – Chadstone was previously within this former local government area.
- Chadstone Football Club
