= David Broad =

Australian cricketer (born 1953)

Personal information
- Born: 25 September 1953 (age 73); Melbourne, Australia

Domestic team information
- Years: Team
- 1976-1980: Victoria
- Source: Cricinfo, 5 December 2015

David Broad (born 25 September 1953) is an Australian former cricketer. He played 13 first-class cricket matches and two List A matches for Victoria between 1976 and 1980.

Broad's cricket career was ended in January 1981 when he almost severed and broke his thumb, and forefinger on his right hand while using a bench saw.

== See also ==
- List of Victoria first-class cricketers
