= Holmesglen Institute of TAFE =

Educational institution in Melbourne, Australia

Holmesglen Institute is a vocational education and higher education institute situated primarily in the South-Eastern suburbs of Melbourne, Australia.

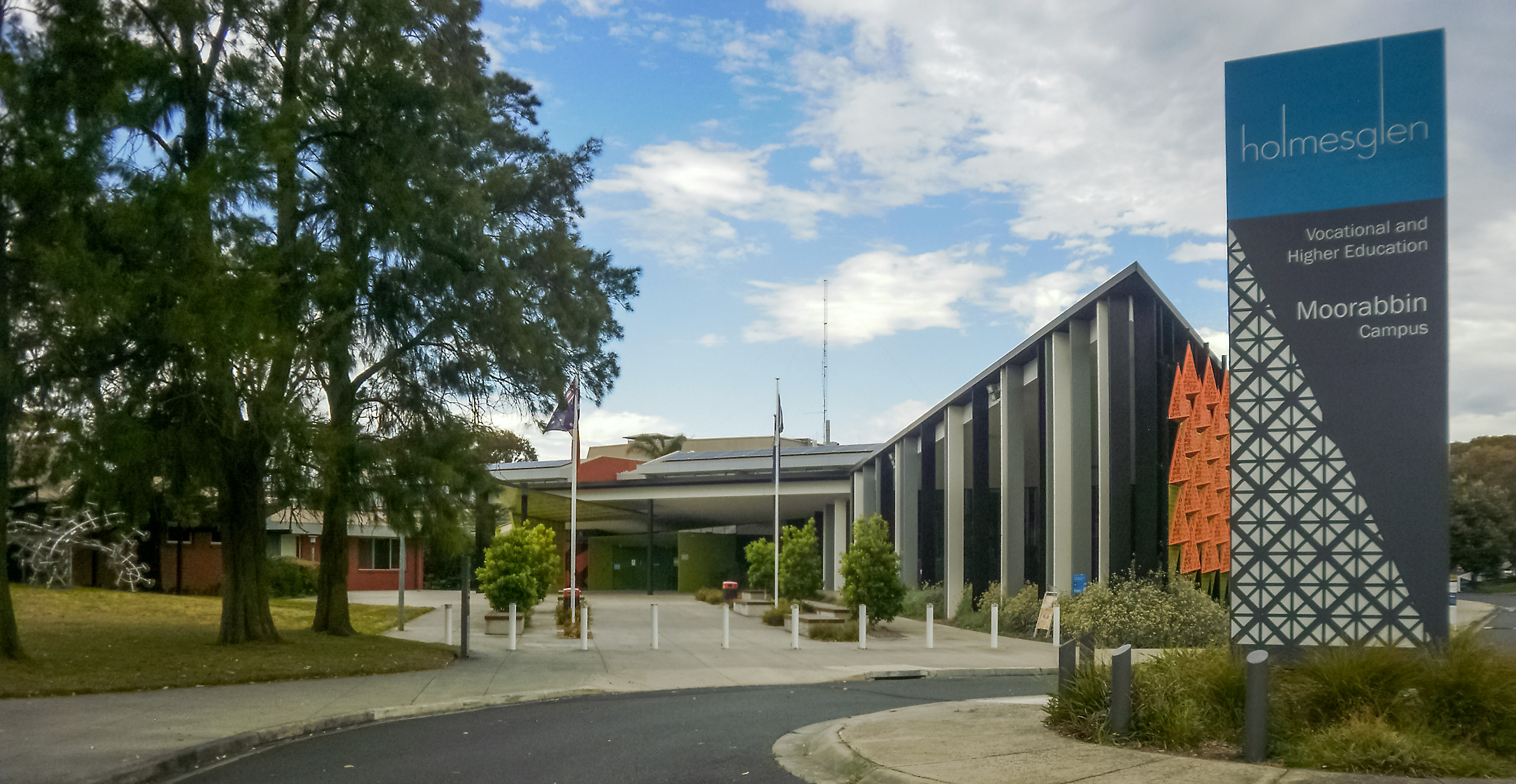
Holmesglen Moorabbin Campus

== History ==
Since its inception in 1982, Holmesglen has grown from a delivery of 90 programs to 7,000 students, to its current offering of over 600 programs to more than 50,000 students. Holmesglen delivers internationally and nationally across three main campuses: Chadstone, Moorabbin, and Glen Waverley.

Founded on apprenticeships and courses for the Building Industry, Holmesglen has since expanded to offer courses in a broad range of subject areas. 2008 saw the introduction of a number of new degree and associate degree programs, increasing the institute's range of higher education courses to 10. New degree programs, most notably the Bachelor of Nursing, commenced in 2009. Holmesglen is the only institute in Australia offering upper secondary, vocational, and higher education.

According to the Australian Business Register, the former names of Holmesglen are:

- Holmesglen Institute of TAFE
- Flooring Technology Training Centre
- Hemisphere Conference Centre
- Hemisphere Hotel.

== Courses ==
The introduction of recent legislation in Australia has opened the door for TAFE institutes to deliver higher education courses at degree level in addition to certificate and diploma level qualifications. Holmesglen has embraced this new opportunity with enthusiasm and has developed several entirely new bachelor's degrees.

The range of courses on offer at Holmesglen rapidly increased over time, and now the institute delivers vocational training for trades as well as more academic courses including ten degrees in the areas of business, building, health & social sciences, hospitality, education & languages, and arts & design.

== Campuses ==
Holmesglen operates on three multidisciplinary campuses: Chadstone (adjacent to Holmesglen train station), Moorabbin, and Glen Waverley. The institute also has smaller, specific campuses on Bourke St in the Melbourne CBD, and in North Melbourne and Eildon.

The Chadstone campus is the largest and most widely recognized. It is here that the traditional trades areas are mostly housed, in addition to many other course areas. The Chadstone campus has three on-site cafeterias in building five, three and one, and it also has McDonald's and Nando's nearby. The campus is within walking distance to Chadstone Shopping Centre.

The Moorabbin campus was acquired from Chisholm TAFE and began operating as a Holmesglen Campus in 2002. Prior to that it was part of Barton TAFE, before it merged to become Chisholm TAFE and before that stood alone as Moorabbin Technical College. This campus delivers a diverse range of courses including hospitality, business, engineering, health sciences, fitness, and short courses. The Moorabbin Campus is also the site of the Holmesglen Vocational College. The Moorabbin campus has one cafeteria in building four, and next to the cafeteria is an on-site Subway.

The Waverley campus is the newest purpose-built facility and delivers training in hospitality, childcare, multimedia, animation, filmmaking, tourism, and recreation.

Holmesglen's Bourke Street campus in the heart of Melbourne city is a specialist facility dedicated exclusively to delivering nursing training.

The North Melbourne campus is the location for Holmesglen's electrical training facility, Futuretech, a collaborative training venture between Holmesglen and the Electrical Trades Union (ETU) Victoria Branch. This campus has served the northern and western suburbs for almost a decade and in that time has won national training awards. Holmesglen Institute has decided to shut down the campus on 30th June 2026.

The Eildon Campus is an offsite rural campus which provides outdoor experiences and setting for student, staff, or corporate training opportunities.
