= Postcodes in Australia =

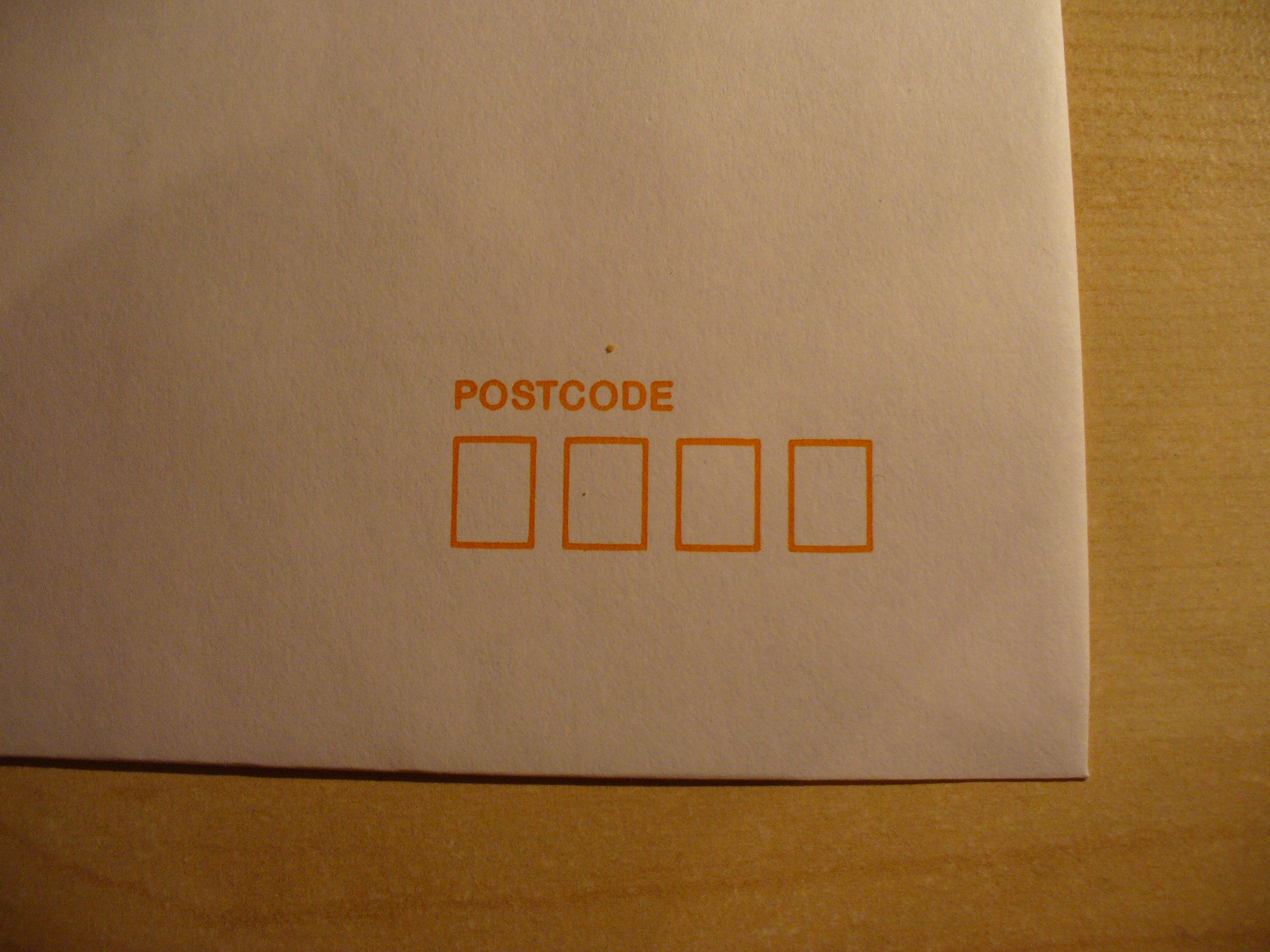
Australian postcodes have four digits; many envelopes for posting within Australia have four square boxes, one for each digit of the postcode.

Postcodes in Australia are used to more efficiently sort and route mail in the Australian postal system. Postcodes in Australia have four digits and are placed at the end of the Australian address, before the country. Postcodes were introduced in Australia in 1967 by the Postmaster-General's Department and are now managed by Australia Post, Australia's national postal service. Postcodes are published in booklets available from post offices or online from the Australia Post website.

Australian envelopes and postcards often have four boxes printed in orange at the bottom right for the postcode. These are used to assist with the automated sorting of mail that has been addressed by hand for Australian delivery.

== History ==
Postcodes were introduced in Australia in 1967 by the Postmaster-General's Department (PMG) to replace earlier postal sorting systems, such as Melbourne's letter and number codes (e.g., N3, E5) and a similar system then used in rural and regional New South Wales. The introduction of the postcodes coincided with the introduction of a large-scale mechanical mail sorting system in Australia, starting with the Redfern Mail Exchange in Sydney.

The initial digit of each postcode was copied directly from the previously-existing numerical prefixes of Australian radio call signs, which were based on state/territory borders. Over time, however, the initial digits of postcodes have deviated from the radio system, for example, the 8000 series refers to special addresses in Victoria. It is sometimes stated, incorrectly, that the initial digits of the postcodes corresponded to the geographical boundaries of the official Australian Military Districts, that existed in 1911–1997. In fact, only the boundaries of the initial 2- and initial 3– postcodes were ever similar to the former 2nd and former 3rd Military Districts, respectively.

By 1968, 75% of mail was using postcodes, and in the same year post office preferred-size envelopes were introduced, which came to be referred to as "standard envelopes".

Postcode squares were introduced in June 1990 to enable Australia Post to use optical character recognition (OCR) software in its mail sorting machines to automatically and more quickly sort mail by postcodes.

== Format ==
Australian postcodes consist of four digits, and are written after the name of the suburb, or town, and the state or territory:

Recipient Name
100 Citizen Road
BLACKTOWN NSW 2148

When writing an address by hand, and a row of four boxes is pre-printed on the lower right-hand corner of an envelope, the postcode may be written in the boxes instead. When posting to an organisation, business names can be written instead of a recipient name. If an article is intended for a specific identity within an organisation, their identity can be prepended on the line above the business name, with c/- prepended to the business name.

If addressing a letter from outside Australia, the postcode is recorded before 'Australia', which is placed on a fourth line.

== Geography ==
Australian postcodes are sorting information. They are often linked with one area; e.g. 6160 belongs only to Fremantle, Western Australia. Due to postcode rationalisation, they can be quite complex, especially in country areas; e.g. 2570 belongs to twenty-two towns and suburbs around Camden, New South Wales. The south-western Victoria 3221 postcode of the Geelong Mail Centre also includes twenty places around Geelong with very few people. This means that mail for these places is not fully sorted until it gets to Geelong. Some postcodes cover large populations (e.g., postcode 4350 serving some 100,000 people in Toowoomba and the surrounding area), while other postcodes have much smaller populations, even in urban areas. Australian postcodes range from 0200 for the Australian National University (now 2601) to 9944 for Cannonvale, Queensland.

Some towns and suburbs have two postcodes—one for street deliveries and another for post office boxes. For example, a street address in the Sydney suburb of Parramatta would be written like this:

Mr John Smith
99 George Street
PARRAMATTA NSW 2150

But mail sent to a PO Box in Parramatta would be addressed:

Mr John Smith
PO Box 99
PARRAMATTA NSW 2124

Many large businesses, government departments and other institutions receiving high volumes of mail had their own postcode as a Large Volume Receiver (LVR), e.g. the Royal Brisbane and Women's Hospital has the postcode 4029, the Australian National University had the postcode 0200. More postcode ranges were made available for LVRs in the 1990s. Australia Post has been progressively discontinuing the LVR programme since 2006.

== Places without postcodes ==
Some places in Australia do not have postcodes. These are typically remote areas with little or no population.

== Allocation ==
=== Australian states and territories ===
The first one or two numerals usually show the state or territory that the postcode belongs to

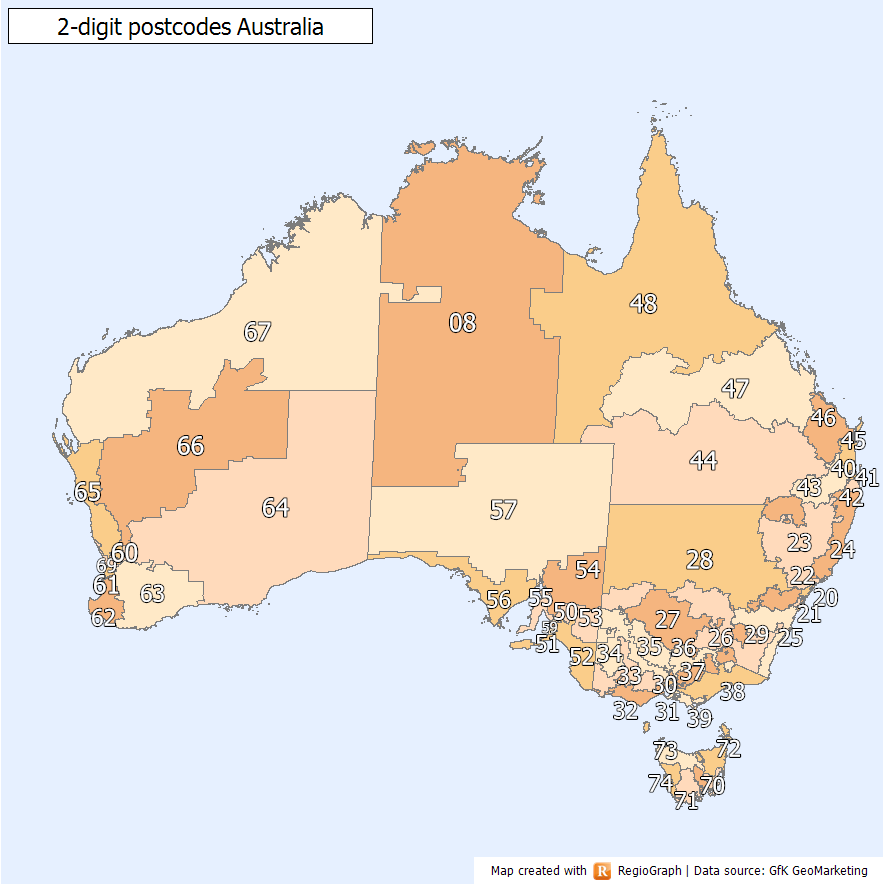
2-digit postcode areas of Australia

State/Territory	Abbreviation	Postcode range
New South Wales	NSW	1000—1999 (LVRs and PO Boxes only); 2000—2599; 2619—2899; 2921—2999
Australian Capital Territory	ACT	0200—0299 (LVRs and PO Boxes only); 2600—2618; 2900—2920
Victoria	VIC	3000—3996; 8000—8999 (LVRs and PO Boxes only)
Queensland	QLD	4000—4999; 9000—9999 (LVRs and PO Boxes only)
South Australia	SA	5000—5799; 5800—5999 (LVRs and PO Boxes only)
Western Australia	WA	6000—6797; 6800—6999 (LVRs and PO Boxes only)
Tasmania	TAS	7000—7799; 7800—7999 (LVRs and PO Boxes only)
Northern Territory	NT	0800—0899; 0900—0999 (LVRs and PO Boxes only)

Sometimes near the state and territory borders, Australia Post finds it easier to send mail through a nearby post office that is across the border:

Postcode	Locality	State derived from Postcode ranges	Actual State for this locality
0872	ERNABELLA	NT	SA
0872	FREGON	NT	SA
0872	INDULKANA	NT	SA
0872	MIMILI	NT	SA
0872	NGAANYATJARRA-GILES	NT	WA
0872	GIBSON DESERT NORTH	NT	WA
0872	GIBSON DESERT SOUTH	NT	WA
2406	MUNGINDI	NSW	NSW and QLD
2540	HMAS CRESWELL	NSW	Jervis Bay Territory
2540	JERVIS BAY	NSW	Jervis Bay Territory
2611	COOLEMAN	ACT	NSW
2611	BIMBERI	ACT	NSW
2611	BRINDABELLA	ACT	NSW
2611	URIARRA	ACT	NSW
2620	HUME	NSW	ACT
2620	KOWEN	NSW	ACT
2620	KOWEN FOREST	NSW	ACT
2620	OAKS ESTATE	NSW	ACT
2620	THARWA	NSW	ACT
2620	TOP NAAS	NSW	ACT
3644	BAROOGA	VIC	NSW
3644	LALALTY	VIC	NSW
3691	LAKE HUME VILLAGE	VIC	NSW
3707	BRINGENBRONG	VIC	NSW
4375	COTTONVALE	QLD	NSW
4377	MARYLAND	QLD	NSW
4380	MINGOOLA	QLD	NSW
4383	JENNINGS	QLD	NSW
4385	TEXAS	QLD	NSW and QLD
4825	ALPURRURULAM	QLD	NT

Some of the postcodes above may cover two or more states. For example, postcode 2620 covers both a locality in NSW (Gundaroo) as well as a locality in the ACT (Hume), and postcode 0872 covers a number of localities across WA, SA and NT.

Three locations (Mingoola, Mungindi and Texas) straddle the NSW-Queensland border (so same town name and postcode on both sides).

Jervis Bay Territory is located on the coast of NSW. It is just south of the towns of Vincentia and Huskisson, with which it shares a postcode. Mail to the Jervis Bay Territory is addressed to the ACT.

The numerals used to show the state on each radio callsign in Australia are the same numeral as the first numeral for postcodes in that state, e.g. 2xx in New South Wales, 3xx in Victoria, etc. Radio callsigns pre-date postcodes in Australia by more than forty years.

=== External territories ===
Australia's external territories are also included in Australia Post's postcode system. While these territories do not belong to any state, they are addressed as such for mail sorting:

External territory	Postal state	Postcode
Norfolk Island	NSW	2899
Christmas Island	WA	6798
Cocos (Keeling) Islands	WA	6799
Heard and McDonald Islands	TAS	7151

Three scientific bases in Antarctica operated by the Australian National Antarctic Research Expeditions share a postcode with the isolated sub-Antarctic island of Macquarie Island (part of Tasmania):

Antarctic base	Postal state	Postcode
Casey Station	TAS	7151
Davis Station	TAS	7151
Mawson Station	TAS	7151

There is also a "special" postcode for routing mail sent to Santa Claus:

Arctic base	Postal state	Postcode
North Pole	VIC	9999

=== State and territory capital cities ===
Each state's capital city ends with three zeroes, while territorial capital cities end with two zeroes. Capital city postcodes were the lowest postcodes in their state or territory range, before new ranges for LVRs and PO Boxes were made available. The last numeral can usually be changed from "0" to "1" to get the postcode for General Post Office boxes in any capital city (though Perth now uses a different range of postcodes for its GPO Boxes):

City	State/Territory	Street Address	GPO Box Address
Sydney	NSW	2000	2001
Canberra	ACT	2600	2601
Melbourne	VIC	3000	3001
Brisbane	QLD	4000	4001
Adelaide	SA	5000	5001
Perth	WA	6000	6001
Hobart	TAS	7000	7001
Darwin	NT	0800	0801

=== Allocation within states ===
While the first numeral of a postcode usually shows the state or territory, the second numeral usually shows a region within the state. However, postcodes with the same second numeral are not always next to each other. As an example, postcodes in the range 2200–2299 are split between the southern suburbs of Sydney and the Central Coast, Lake Macquarie and Newcastle regions of New South Wales.

Postcodes with a second numeral of "0" or "1" are almost always located within the metropolitan area of the state's capital city. Postcodes with higher second numerals are usually located in rural and regional areas. Common exceptions are where towns were rural when postcodes were first introduced in 1967, but have since been suburbanised and incorporated into metropolitan areas, e.g. Penrith, New South Wales has the postcode 2750 and Petrie, Queensland has the postcode 4502.

Within each region with the same second numeral, postcodes are usually allocated in ascending order the further one travels from the state's capital city along major highways and railways. For instance, heading north on the North Coast railway in New South Wales away from Sydney:

Town	Postcode	Distance from Central Station
Dungog	2420	245 km (152 mi)
Taree	2430	378 km (235 mi)
Kempsey	2440	503 km (313 mi)
Coffs Harbour	2450	607 km (377 mi)
Grafton	2460	695 km (432 mi)
Casino	2470	805 km (500 mi)

=== Major towns and cities ===
Major towns and cities tend to have "0" as the last numeral or last two numerals, e.g. Rockhampton, Queensland has the postcode 4700 and Ballarat, Victoria has the postcode 3350. There are exceptions; the major town of Ipswich, Queensland has the postcode 4305, while Goodna, a relatively small suburb of Ipswich, is allocated 4300.

== Postcode squares ==
Australia Post used to prefer envelopes sold in Australia to have four boxes in the bottom right corner of the front of the envelope. Entering the postcode in these boxes or squares, which Australia Post calls postcode squares, enabled Australia Post to use optical character recognition software in its mail sorting machines to automatically and more quickly sort mail into postcodes, which also embeds routing information. Postcode squares were introduced in June 1990. However, more recently Australia Post has recommended not using the postcode squares at all and writing the postcode on the address line.

== Other uses ==
Many other organisations now use postcodes. Insurance companies often use postcodes when working out the cost of car and house insurance. Transport for NSW uses postcodes to give specific numbers for each bus stop in Greater Sydney. The stop number is five to seven numbers: the first four are the postcode, and the others show the bus stop (sometimes written with a space in between, e.g. "2000 108").

Many companies that produce metropolitan street maps also list the postcodes for each suburb, both in indexes and on the maps themselves. Spatial representation of postcodes is also very popular in defining sales and franchise territories.

Australian Bureau of Statistics, Australian Taxation Office and many other Federal and State government organisations publish a variety of statistics by postcode which extends the use Australia Post four digit code to many business and social planning related activities.

There is an inherent problem with spatial representation of postcodes since areas referenced to a specific postal code tend to change over time, as new postcodes are added or existing ones are split by Australia Post for operational purposes.

Some mail generating software can automatically sort outward mail by postcode before it is generated. This pre-sort of mail into postcode order eliminates the need for it to be sorted manually or using mail sorting machines.

== Mechanised sorting ==
To improve mechanised sorting, each address now has a sorting number which is printed on the letter as an orange-coloured barcode. This number might be 12 digits long. This system enables the post office to place items in delivery order. Companies can also use Rapid Addressing Tool (RATS) to print Customer Addressed Barcodes, which are printed above the address. Every Delivery Point in Australia (DPID) has its own number. Barcode sorter machines sort and sequence letters up to C5 size. Flat multi-level OCR reads, imprints and sorts C5 to A3 sized articles.

== See also ==
- Postal codes in Canada
- Postcodes in the United Kingdom
- Postcodes in New Zealand
- ZIP code in USA
